= Dejan Savić =

Serbian water polo player (born 1975)

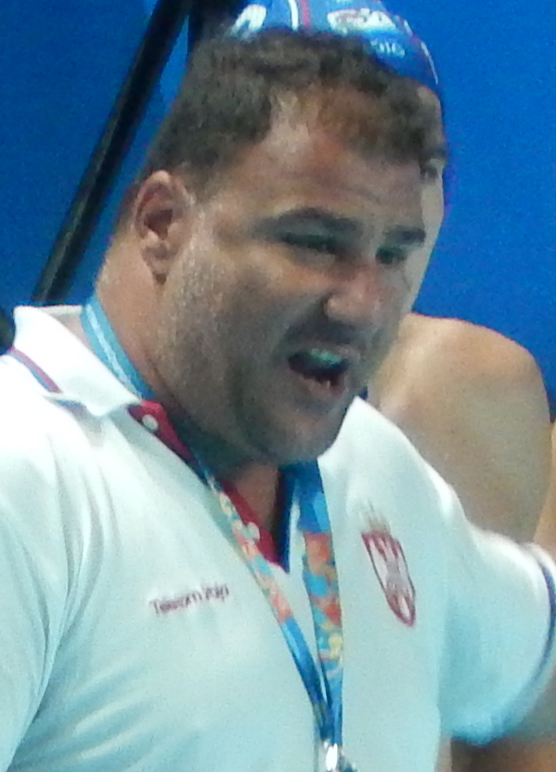
- Savić coaching Serbia at the 2015 World Championships

Personal information
- Nationality: Serbian
- Born: 24 April 1975 (age 51) Belgrade, SR Serbia, SFR Yugoslavia
- Height: 192 cm (6 ft 4 in)
- Weight: 135 kg (298 lb)

Sport
- Sport: Water polo
- Handedness: R
- Current club: Sliema

Senior clubs
- Years: Team
- 1989–1998: Partizan
- 1998–2000: Barcelona
- 2000–2001: Atlètic-Barceloneta
- 2001–2003: Florentia
- 2003–2005: Pro Recco
- 2005–2010: Sintez
- 2010–2011: Crvena zvezda

Teams coached
- 2012–2022: Serbia
- 2011–2015: Crvena zvezda
- 2017–2018: Crvena zvezda
- 2022–2023: Crvena zvezda
- 2023–: Sliema
Medal record
Representing FR Yugoslavia, Serbia and Montenegro and Serbia
Olympic Games
Silver medal – second place	2004 Athens
Bronze medal – third place	2000 Sydney
Bronze medal – third place	2008 Beijing
World Championships
Gold medal – first place	2005 Montreal
Silver medal – second place	2001 Fukuoka
Bronze medal – third place	1998 Perth
Bronze medal – third place	2003 Barcelona
European Championship
Gold medal – first place	2001 Budapest
Gold medal – first place	2003 Kranj
Gold medal – first place	2006 Belgrade
Silver medal – second place	1997 Seville
Silver medal – second place	2008 Málaga
FINA World League
Gold medal – first place	2005 Belgrade
Gold medal – first place	2006 Athens
Gold medal – first place	2007 Berlin
Gold medal – first place	2008 Genova
Silver medal – second place	2004 Long Beach
FINA World Cup
Gold medal – first place	2006 Budapest
Bronze medal – third place	2002 Belgrade
Mediterranean Games
Gold medal – first place	1997 Bari
Universiade
Gold medal – first place	1995 Fukuoka
Head Coach for Serbia
Olympic Games
Gold medal – first place	2016 Rio de Janeiro
Gold medal – first place	2020 Tokyo
World Championship
Gold medal – first place	2015 Kazan
Bronze medal – third place	2017 Budapest
European Championship
Gold medal – first place	2014 Budapest
Gold medal – first place	2016 Belgrade
Gold medal – first place	2018 Barcelona
FINA World Cup
Gold medal – first place	2014 Almaty
Bronze medal – third place	2018 Berlin
FINA World League
Gold medal – first place	2013 Chelyabinsk
Gold medal – first place	2014 Dubai
Gold medal – first place	2015 Bergamo
Gold medal – first place	2016 Huizhou
Gold medal – first place	2017 Ruza
Gold medal – first place	2019 Belgrade
Mediterranean Games
Gold medal – first place	2018 Tarragona

Dejan Savić (Serbian Cyrillic: Дејан Савић; born 24 April 1975) is a Serbian professional water polo coach and former player.

During his playing career, he was part of two Olympic bronze medal squads, one for FR Yugoslavia at the 2000 Olympics in Sydney, the other for Serbia at the 2008 Olympics in Beijing, and one Olympic silver medal squad for Serbia and Montenegro at the 2004 Olympics in Athens.

Savić started training with the Partizan water polo club at the age of five and he debuted for the first team (seniors) at the age of thirteen, while still a pupil in elementary school. His last club was VK Crvena zvezda where he was team captain. He retired from active playing at the end of the 2010/11 season. At international level, Savić represented FR Yugoslavia, Serbia and Montenegro and Serbia, in 444 matches and scored 405 goals. He is the most capped player in Serbian water polo.

He began coaching VK Crvena zvezda in 2011 and stayed there until 2015. He also became head coach of the Serbia men's national water polo team in autumn 2012 and stayed until 2023.

== Club career as coach ==
=== Crvena zvezda ===
In 2011, after finishing his long playing career, Savić remained with his club Crvena zvezda in the position of head coach. In 2015, Savić left the position in Crvena zvezda. In February 2022, he returned to Crvena zvezda as head coach.

== National career ==
Savić is one of a few sportspeople who won Olympic medals in water polo as players and head coaches.

=== As player ===
Savić made his debut for the national team in 1994, during a time of sanctions for Yugoslavia, following All-Star selections in a tournament in Italy. He became the standard no. five (wing) player for the team almost without a break over the whole of his national career. Holding the record for the highest number of matches played (444), and also being a highly successful scorer (405 goals), he is considered to be among the true legends of Serbian sports. During his career, from a player in charge of sifting the opposing networks, he developed into the strongest pillar of Serbia's defense in front of the goal. With his power and imagination, he was a prominent member of the team. From 1997, Savić was part of the Yugoslav/Serbian water polo team in every competition in which they won a medal. In a duel with Montenegro at the 2008 Olympic Games, he was one of the players most responsible for Serbia's triumph when they won the bronze medal that year. Savić played his last match with the national team in China in 2011.

=== As coach ===
Savić was named as head coach of the Serbia national team after Dejan Udovičić left the position in 2012. Under Savić's leadership, the national team won the 2020 and 2016 Olympic Games, the 2015 World Championship, three European Championships (2014, 2016 and 2018), and six World League titles (2013, 2014, 2015, 2016, 2017 and 2019). In little over twelve months, between August 2015 and August 2016, the Serbian national team won consecutively all four of the biggest titles in Water Polo – the 2015 World Championship, the 2016 European Championship, the 2016 World League, and the 2016 and 2020 Olympic Games – an unprecedented achievement.

== Honours ==
=== As coach ===
==== Crvena zvezda ====
- LEN Champions League: 2012–13
- Serbian Championship: 2012–13, 2013–14
- Serbian Cup: 2012–13, 2013–14
- Regional A2 League: 2017–18
- LEN Super Cup: 2014

=== As player ===
==== Partizan ====
- Yugoslavian Championship: 1994–95
- Yugoslavia Cup: 1989–90, 1990–91, 1991–92, 1992–93, 1993–94, 1994–95
- LEN Cup: 1997–98
- LEN Super Cup: 1991
- LEN Cup Winners' Cup: 1990
- Mediterranean Championship: 1989

==== CN Barcelona ====
- Copa del Rey: 1998–9

==== CN Atlètic-Barceloneta ====
- Spanish Championship: 2000–01
- Copa del Rey: 2000–01
- Supercopa de España: 2001

==== Rari Nantes Florentia ====
- LEN Cup Winners' Cup: 2001

==== Pro Recco ====
- LEN Super Cup: 2004

==== Sintez Kazan ====
- Russian Championship: 2006–07
- Russian Cup: 2004–05, 2009–10
- LEN Euro Cup: 2006–07

== Individual honours ==
It was announced on 1 June 2010 that Dejan Savić won the national sports award, which includes lifetime monthly fees. Savić was honored for winning a silver medal at the 2004 Olympic Games in Athens.

== See also ==
- Serbia men's Olympic water polo team records and statistics
- Serbia and Montenegro men's Olympic water polo team records and statistics
- List of Olympic champions in men's water polo
- List of Olympic medalists in water polo (men)
- List of players who have appeared in multiple men's Olympic water polo tournaments
- List of world champions in men's water polo
- List of World Aquatics Championships medalists in water polo
