= Aleksandar Ćirić =

Serbian water polo player (born 1977)

Personal information
- Born: 30 December 1977 (age 48) Belgrade, SR Serbia, SFR Yugoslavia
Medal record
Men's water polo
Representing Yugoslavia, Serbia and Montenegro and Serbia
Olympic Games
Silver medal – second place	2004 Athens
Bronze medal – third place	2000 Sydney
Bronze medal – third place	2008 Beijing
World Championship
Gold medal – first place	2005 Montreal
Silver medal – second place	2001 Fukuoka
Bronze medal – third place	1998 Perth
Bronze medal – third place	2003 Barcelona
European Championship
Gold medal – first place	2001 Budapest
Gold medal – first place	2003 Kranj
Gold medal – first place	2006 Belgrade
Silver medal – second place	2008 Málaga
FINA World League
Gold medal – first place	2005 Belgrade
Gold medal – first place	2006 Athens
Gold medal – first place	2007 Berlin
Gold medal – first place	2008 Genova
Silver medal – second place	2004 Long Beach
FINA World Cup
Gold medal – first place	2006 Budapest
Bronze medal – third place	2002 Belgrade
Mediterranean Games
Gold medal – first place	1997 Bari
Universiade
Gold medal – first place	1995 Fukuoka

Aleksandar Ćirić (Serbian Cyrillic: Александар Ћирић, born 30 December 1977 in Belgrade) is a Serbian retired water polo player and current head coach of European powerhouse Olympiacos Women's Water Polo Team, who played for two Olympic bronze medal squads, one for FR Yugoslavia at the 2000 Olympics in Sydney, the other for Serbia at the 2008 Olympics in Beijing, and one Olympic silver medal squad for Serbia and Montenegro at the 2004 Olympics in Athens. His most notable achievements during his club career are: winning the Euroleague with VK Bečej in 2000, when he gained the title of MVP of competition; and four LEN Cups, three with Brescia and one with VK Radnički Kragujevac.

== Club career ==
In July 2007. Aleksandar Ćirić became a new member of the Montenegrin premier league team Budvanska Rivijera. As stated by the Podgorica daily paper "Vijesti" Ćirić signed a two-year contract with Budva, who wanted to challenge Primorac, the champion of Montenegro and Jadran from Herceg Novi.

In June 2010. Ćirić signed a two-year contract with the Spanish Barceloneta. He played last season for Budva. "It is a mutual satisfaction and I signed a two-year contract with Barceloneta. In an interview with the leaders of the club, I saw that the ambitions are high. Aim is to defend the double crown in Spain, and to get as far as possible in the Euroleague." Ćirić said in a statement. He is currently playing for ENKA Istanbul (TUR).

=== Clubs he played for ===
- ____–1994 Crvena Zvezda Jupeks
- 1994–2001 VK Bečej Naftagas
- 2001–2007 AN Brescia
- 2007–2010 VK Budva
- 2010–2012 Barceloneta
- 2012–2013 VK Radnički Kragujevac
- 2013–____ ENKA Istanbul (TUR)

== Honours ==
=== Club ===
VK Crvena Zvezda

- National Championship of Yugoslavia (1): 1992–93

VK Bečej Naftagas

- National Championship of Yugoslavia (6): 1995–96, 1996–97, 1997–98, 1998–99, 1999–2000, 2000–01
- National Cup of Yugoslavia (6): 1995–96, 1996–97, 1997–98, 1998–99, 1999–2000, 2000–01
- LEN Euroleague (1): 1999–2000

AN Brescia

- Serie A1 (1): 2002–03
- LEN Cup (3): 2001–02, 2002–03, 2005–06

PVK Budva

- Montenegrin Water Polo Cup (1): 2007–08

CN Atlètic-Barceloneta

- División de Honor (1): 2010–11
- Supercopa de España (1): 2010–11

VK Radnički Kragujevac

- LEN Trophy (1): 2012–13

=== Individual ===
- LEN Euroleague MVP (1): 1999–2000

== See also ==
- Serbia men's Olympic water polo team records and statistics
- Serbia and Montenegro men's Olympic water polo team records and statistics
- List of Olympic medalists in water polo (men)
- List of World Aquatics Championships medalists in water polo
