= Danilo Ikodinović =

Serbian water polo player

Personal information
- Born: 4 October 1976 (age 50) Belgrade, SFR Yugoslavia
Medal record
Men's water polo
Representing Serbia and Montenegro Serbia
Men's water polo
Olympic Games
| Silver medal – second place | 2004 Athens |
| Bronze medal – third place | 2000 Sydney |
World Championships
| Gold medal – first place | 2005 Montreal |
| Silver medal – second place | 2001 Fukuoka |
| Bronze medal – third place | 1998 Perth |
| Bronze medal – third place | 2003 Barcelona |
European Championship
| Gold medal – first place | 2001 Budapest |
| Gold medal – first place | 2003 Kranj |
| Gold medal – first place | 2006 Belgrade |
| Silver medal – second place | 1997 Seville |
FINA World League
| Gold medal – first place | 2005 Belgrade |
| Gold medal – first place | 2006 Athens |
| Gold medal – first place | 2008 Genova |
| Silver medal – second place | 2004 Long Beach |
FINA World Cup
| Gold medal – first place | 2006 Budapest |
| Bronze medal – third place | 2002 Belgrade |
Mediterranean Games
| Gold medal – first place | 1997 Bari |

Danilo “Dača” Ikodinović (Serbian Cyrillic: Данило Дача Икодиновић, born 4 October 1976) is a Serbian former professional water polo player who played on the bronze medal squad at the 2000 Summer Olympics (with Yugoslavia) and the silver medal squad at the 2004 Summer Olympics (with Serbia and Montenegro). He received a Golden Badge, award for the best athlete in Serbia and Montenegro.

== Club career ==
He spent the 2005/06 season playing for VK Partizan. He appeared for the Serbian national water polo team in 304 matches, scoring 299 goals. In 2006, he appeared as a model in an underwear campaign for ExtremeIntimo. During the summer of 2006 he signed for Russian club Sintez Kazan. In his first season in Sintez Kazan, Ikodinović led the team to 2006/07 LEN Cup trophy as well as the Russian league title. In late March 2008, he reached an agreement with PVK Jadran to play for them in 2008/09 season.

=== Clubs he played for ===
- 1992–1998 VK Partizan
- 1998–1999 ASN Catania
- 1999–2001 AN Brescia
- 2001–2005 Pro Recco
- 2005–2006 VK Partizan
- 2006–2008 Sintez
- 2008–2009 PVK Jadran

== Honours ==
=== Club ===
VK Partizan

- National Championship of Yugoslavia (1): 1994–95
- National Cup of Yugoslavia (3): 1992–93, 1993–94, 1994–95
- LEN Cup (1): 1997–98

Pro Recco

- Serie A1 (1): 2001–02
- Trofeo del Giocatore (1): 2003
- LEN Euroleague (1): 2002–03
- LEN Supercup (1): 2004

Sintez Kazan

- National Championship of Russia (1): 2006–07
- LEN Cup (1): 2006–07

=== Individual ===
- LEN Euroleague Final Four MVP (1): 2003 Genova
- Golden Badge (1): 2005

== Post-playing ==
=== Administrative work ===
While in recovery following his June 2008 motorcycle crash that forced the end of his professional water polo playing career, Ikodinović, who had since relocated to Novi Sad, took a board position at a local waterpolo club, VK Vojvodina.

=== Hospitality entrepreneurship ===
In December 2010, together with business partner Aleksandar Dobrijević, Ikodinović became part of a newly launched hospitality venture—a kafana named Tako je suđeno (That's Fate) located in Novi Sad's Ribnjak neighbourhood with an interior themed around Northern Serbia ethnographic motifs. The restaurant's opening night generated attention in Serbian media, with most outlets focusing on the presence of Ikodinović's pop star celebrity wife Nataša Bekvalac. It would soon be revealed that Ikodinović's initial involvement with the venue is not in majority ownership capacity but mostly as its maître d' of sorts as well as its front facing promoter due to his high public profile in Serbia.

=== Politics ===
Ikodinović endorsed the Serbian Progressive Party (SNS) for the 2018 Belgrade City Assembly election, however, later he became a strong critic of SNS and its leader Aleksandar Vučić. On 17 March 2021, Ikodinović joined the People's Party (NS) and was appointed president of its Sports Committee.

== Personal ==
=== Marriages, relationships, and children ===
In 2000, Ikodinović married his girlfriend Anja who gave birth to their daughter Andrea later that year. The couple divorced in 2003.

For a few months during 2004, he dated professional karate competitor Snežana Perić. The relationship was high profile in Serbian public with extensive coverage in the country's tabloids and lifestyle magazines.

In the summer of 2004, Ikodinović began dating the Serbian pop singer Nataša Bekvalac shortly after being introduced to her at a reception in Novi Sad by a friend, professional handballer Vlada Mandić, who had been dating her sister Kristina at the time. Once Ikodinović and Bekvalac made their involvement known publicly in late December 2004 by appearing together at a New Year's Eve celebration in Novi Sad's Hotel Park, the relationship immediately began generating immense media coverage in Serbia. In August 2005, upon his return from winning the World Championships with Serbia and Montenegro national team in Montreal, Ikodinović married Bekvalac in a civic ceremony they initially kept hidden even from their respective families. One year later, in late July 2006, with Bekvalac in early stage of pregnancy, the couple held a church wedding ceremony at the St. Nicholas Cathedral in Sremski Karlovci followed by reception at Novi Sad's Hotel Park. Their child, daughter Hana, was born in March 2007 while Danilo was away in Melbourne with Serbia national team at the World Championships. The couple separated in January 2011 amid allegations of Ikodinović's infidelity. Despite initially agreeing principal terms of an uncontested divorce, subsequent disagreements over division of assets led to the case going before the divorce court. By May 2011, they managed to finalize the divorce terms that included Bekvalac getting custody of their 4-year-old daughter. In an interview years later, Ikodinović stated that the marriage had been "disintegrating" even before his June 2008 motorcycle accident and that it would have ended regardless.

By March 2011, Ikodinović began dating Tanja Vračarić. Taking place simultaneously with the legal proceedings in Ikodinović's divorce from Bekvalac, the relationship ended within three months.

In 2013, thirty-six-year-old retired professional athlete Ikodinović started dating the active professional volleyball player Maja Ognjenović, 8 years his junior. The couple married in late December 2016. They divorced in September 2025.

=== Motorcycle collision ===
On Friday, 27 June 2008, around 8:20pm while riding his Yamaha R1 motorcycle, Ikodinović caused a traffic collision at the 53rd kilometre of the Zrenjanin-Novi Sad regional road near the town of Kać. Riding under the influence, he rear-ended a Yugo 55 (Zastava Koral 1.1) driven by Pajica Dejanović that had been overtaking an IMT 533 tractor vehicle driven by Miroslav Kukić. The thirty-one-year-old professional water polo player was transferred to the intensive care unit of Novi Sad's Vojvodina Clinical Center and immediately taken for vascular and maxillofacial surgery performed by a team of surgeons for almost eight hours. As a result, his condition was stabilized but remained critical. Reportedly, of the numerous injuries he sustained, the heaviest trauma occurred on his right arm with severe tearing of blood vessels (nerves and arteries). He was subsequently placed in an induced coma.

The next day, in the evening hours of 28 June 2008, almost twenty four hours following the accident, he underwent another vascular surgery on his right arm. Over the subsequent weeks, his condition gradually improved and by the end of July 2008, he was taken off the respirator and brought out of the coma. During early July, while in induced coma, he was visited at the hospital by the President of Serbia, Boris Tadić. After two months in the hospital, Ikodinović was discharged for further home rehabilitation in late August 2008.

The crash investigation was completed by mid November 2008, determining that Ikodinović had been driving at a speed of 173 km/h with blood alcohol content of over 2 per mil (considered to be the medium level of alcoholic intoxication) when he rear-ended Dejanović's Yugo that had just begun overtaking Kukić's tractor vehicle.

Ikodinović was charged with violating traffic safety. On 5 March 2009, his case went before a Novi Sad Municipal Court judge who ruled him guilty of causing the accident and ordered him to pay RSD70,000 (around €760 according to the exchange rate at the time). Ikodinović further received an eight-month ban on operating 'Category A' motorized vehicles in Serbia, i.e. motorcycles and mopeds. Due to not being satisfied with the amount of the fine, the district public prosecutor submitted an appeal on the court's decision. The damages part of the case was settled out of court on 26 May 2009, with Ikodinović paying Pajica Dejanović an undisclosed sum that some media outlets reported to be €6,000.

== See also ==
- List of Olympic medalists in water polo (men)
- List of world champions in men's water polo
- List of World Aquatics Championships medalists in water polo

Awards
| Preceded by Denis Šefik | The Best Athlete of Serbia and Montenegro; 2005 | Succeeded by Olivera Jevtić (Serbia) |
