= Gergely Kiss =

Hungarian water polo player

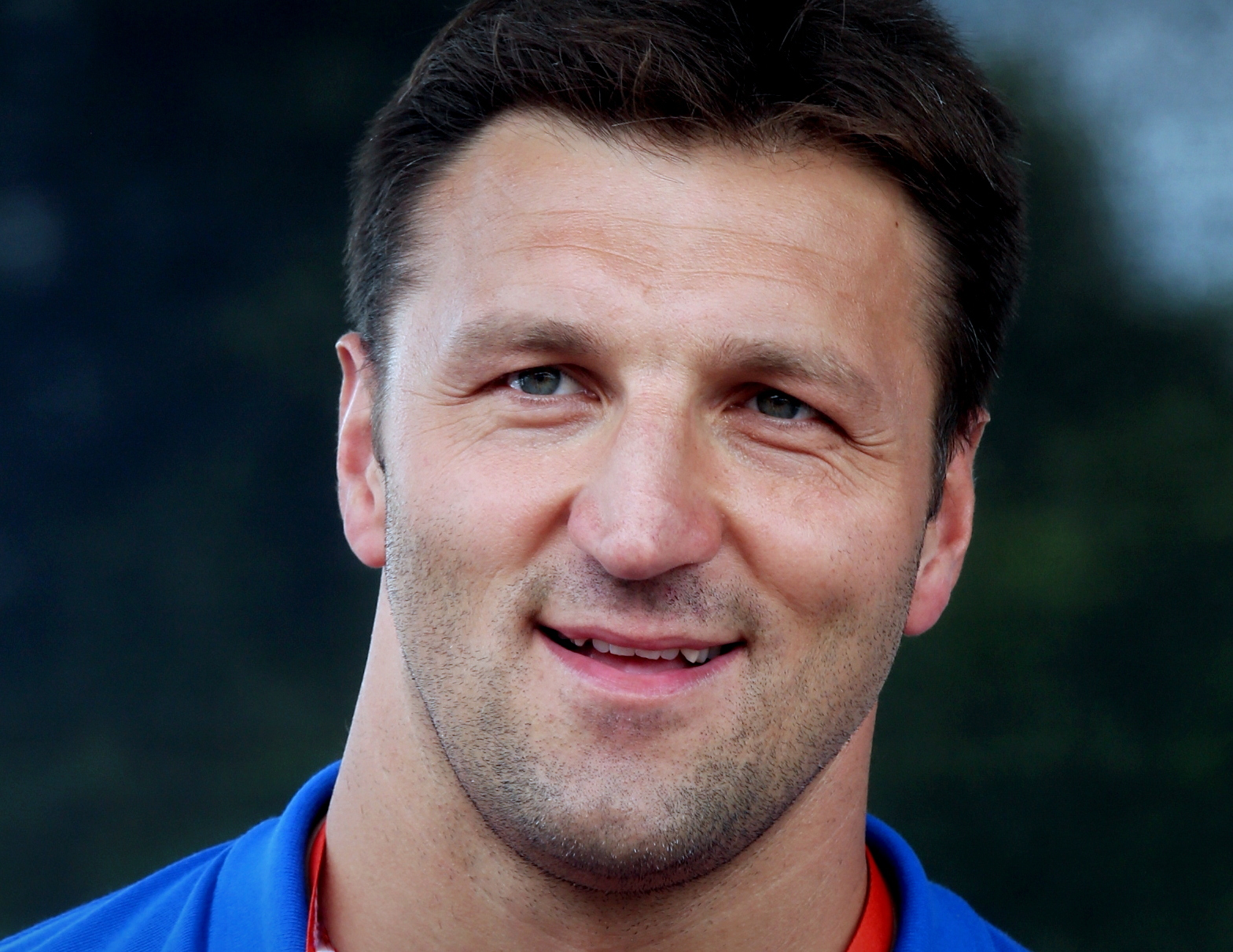
- Kiss in 2016

Personal information
- Nickname: Geri
- Nationality: Hungarian
- Born: 21 September 1977 (age 49) Budapest, Hungary
- Height: 1.98 m (6 ft 6 in)
- Weight: 112 kg (247 lb)

Sport
- Sport: Water polo
- Handedness: Left
- Position: Driver

Youth career
- Years: Team
- 1986–1990: BVSC
- 1990–: Tungsram

Senior clubs
- Years: Team
- –1995: Tungsram
- 1995–1996: Kordax BSC
- 1996–1997: FTC-Vitalin
- 1997–1998: Themis Posillipo
- 1998–1999: UTE-Taxi 2000
- 1999–2000: Canottieri Napoli
- 2000–2001: Universo Bologna
- 2001–2008: Domino-Honvéd
- 2008–2010: Primorac Kotor
- 2010–2012: TEVA-Vasas-UNIQA
- 2012–2019: Bp. Honvéd
- 2013: → Sliema (Summer League)
- 2015: → Valletta (Summer League)
National team
- Years: Team
- 1994–2012: Hungary
Medal record
Men's water polo
Representing Hungary
Olympic Games
| Gold medal – first place | 2000 Sydney | Team competition |
| Gold medal – first place | 2004 Athens | Team competition |
| Gold medal – first place | 2008 Beijing | Team competition |
World Championships
| Gold medal – first place | 2003 Barcelona | Team competition |
| Silver medal – second place | 1998 Perth | Team competition |
| Silver medal – second place | 2005 Montréal | Team competition |
| Silver medal – second place | 2007 Melbourne | Team competition |
European Championship
| Gold medal – first place | 1997 Seville | Team competition |
| Gold medal – first place | 1999 Firenze | Team competition |
| Silver medal – second place | 2006 Belgrade | Team competition |
| Bronze medal – third place | 2001 Budapest | Team competition |
| Bronze medal – third place | 2003 Kranj | Team competition] |
| Bronze medal – third place | 2008 Málaga | Team competition |
| Bronze medal – third place | 2012 Eindhoven | Team competition |
FINA World League
| Gold medal – first place | 2003 New York | Team competition |
| Gold medal – first place | 2004 Long Beach | Team competition |
| Silver medal – second place | 2007 Berlin | Team competition |
| Bronze medal – third place | 2002 Patras | Team competition |
FINA World Cup
| Gold medal – first place | 1999 Sydney | Team competition |
| Silver medal – second place | 2002 Belgrade | Team competition |
| Silver medal – second place | 2006 Budapest | Team competition |
| Bronze medal – third place | 1997 Athens | Team competition |

Dr. Gergely "Gergő" Kiss (born 21 September 1977) is a Hungarian former water polo player. He was considered to be one of the best left-handed water polo players of his time. Kiss is one of six male athletes who won three Olympic gold medals in water polo. He played on the right side, but moved to 2-meters on offense sometimes.

Kiss dominated internationally in the 2004 Olympics in Athens, especially in final match against Serbia and Montenegro. The Hungarian team was not at its best in the first quarter, but Kiss was able to score thrice, helping them to keep up with their opponent. After the Hungarian side came back to tie the game in the fourth quarter, Kiss put in the game-winning goal on a 'power play' opportunity. He was voted to be in the all-star team along with teammate Tamás Kásás. Kiss first became known internationally at Olympic level during the 2000 Olympics in Sydney helping Hungary win gold in the finals.

Kiss, nicknamed Geri, was greatly influenced by his coach Dénes Kemény. He finished studying law in 2005.

== Honours ==
=== National ===
- Olympic Games: Gold medal - 2000, 2004, 2008
- World Championships: Gold medal - 2003; Silver medal - 1998, 2005, 2007
- European Championship: Gold medal - 1997, 1999; Silver medal - 2006; Bronze medal - 2001, 2003, 2008, 2012
- FINA World League: Gold medal - 2003, 2004; Silver medal - 2007; Bronze medal - 2002
- FINA World Cup: Gold medal - 1999; Silver medal - 2002, 2006; Bronze medal - 1997
- Junior World Championships: (Gold medal - 1995; Silver medal - 1997)
- Junior European Championship: (Gold medal - 1994)

=== Club ===
- Euroleague Winners (3): (1998 - with Posillipo; 2004 - with Bp. Honvéd; 2009 - with Primorac Kotor)
- LEN Cup Winners (1): (1999 - with UTE)
- LEN Super Cup Winner (2): (2004 - with Bp. Honvéd; 2009 - with Primorac Kotor)
- Hungarian Championship (OB I): 6x (2002, 2003, 2004, 2005, 2006 - with Bp. Honvéd; 2012 - with Vasas)
- Hungarian Cup (Magyar Kupa): 2x (1997 - with FTC; 2006 - with Bp. Honvéd)
- Hungarian SuperCup (Szuperkupa): 1x (2005 - with Bp. Honvéd)
- Montenegrin Cup (Kup Crne Gore): 1x (2010 - with Primorac Kotor)

== Awards ==
- Masterly youth athlete: 1995, 1996, 1997
- Member of the Hungarian team of year: 1997, 1999, 2000, 2003, 2004, 2008
- Golden cap (2000, 2004)
- Honorary Citizen of Budapest (2008)
- Hungarian Water Polo Player of the Year: 2009
- Ministerial Certificate of Merit (2012)
- Member of International Swimming Hall of Fame (2015)

Orders

- Officer's Cross of the Order of Merit of the Republic of Hungary (2000)
- Commander's Cross of the Order of Merit of the Republic of Hungary (2004)
- Commander's Cross of the Order of Merit of the Republic of Hungary with the Star (2008)

== See also ==
- Hungary men's Olympic water polo team records and statistics
- List of multiple Olympic gold medalists in one event
- List of Olympic champions in men's water polo
- List of Olympic medalists in water polo (men)
- List of players who have appeared in multiple men's Olympic water polo tournaments
- List of men's Olympic water polo tournament top goalscorers
- List of world champions in men's water polo
- List of World Aquatics Championships medalists in water polo
- List of members of the International Swimming Hall of Fame
