= Petar Trbojević =

Serbian water polo player

Personal information
- Born: 9 September 1973 (age 52) Niš, SR Serbia, SFR Yugoslavia
Medal record
Men's water polo
Representing Yugoslavia and Serbia and Montenegro
Men's water polo
Olympic Games
Silver medal – second place	2004 Athens
Bronze medal – third place	2000 Sydney
World Championships
Gold medal – first place	2005 Montreal
Silver medal – second place	2001 Fukuoka
Bronze medal – third place	1998 Perth
European Championship
Gold medal – first place	2001 Budapest
Gold medal – first place	2006 Belgrade
Silver medal – second place	1997 Seville
FINA World League
Gold medal – first place	2005 Belgrade
Gold medal – first place	2006 Athens
FINA World Cup
Bronze medal – third place	2002 Belgrade
Mediterranean Games
Gold medal – first place	1997 Bari
Universiade
Gold medal – first place	1995 Fukuoka

Petar Trbojević (born 9 September 1973) is a Serbian former water polo player who played on the bronze medal squad of FR Yugoslavia at the 2000 Summer Olympics and the silver medal squad of Serbia and Montenegro at the 2004 Summer Olympics.

== Club career ==
=== Clubs he played for ===
- 1990–1996 Partizan Belgrade
- 1996–1999 NC Vouliagmeni
- 1999–2001 Barceloneta
- 2001–2004 Olympiacos
- 2004–2009 Barceloneta
- ____–____ ASWP Pescara
- 2009–2013 PVK Budvanska rivijera

== Honours ==
=== Club ===
VK Partizan

- National Championship of Yugoslavia (1): 1994–95
- National Cup of Yugoslavia (5): 1990–91, 1991–92, 1992–93, 1993–94, 1994–95
- LEN Cup Winners' Cup (1): 1990–91
- LEN Super Cup (1): 1991

NC Vouliagmeni

- A1 Ethniki (2): 1996–97, 1997–98
- Greek Cup (1): 1998–99
- Greek Super Cup (1): 1996
- LEN Cup Winners' Cup (1): 1997

CN Atlètic-Barceloneta

- División de Honor (5): 2000–01, 2005–06, 2006–07, 2007–08, 2008–09
- Copa del Rey (6): 1999–2000, 2000–01, 2005–06, 2006–07, 2007–08, 2008–09
- Supercopa de España (5): 2001, 2006, 2007, 2008, 2009
- Copa de Cataluña (4): 2006, 2007, 2008, 2009

Olympiacos

- A1 Ethniki (3): 2001–02, 2002–03, 2003–04
- Greek Cup (3): 2001–02, 2002–03, 2003–04
- LEN Euroleague (1): 2001–02
- LEN Super Cup (1): 2002

PVK Budva

- Montenegrin First League (2): 2010–11, 2012–13
- Montenegrin Cup (1): 2010–11

== See also ==
- List of Olympic medalists in water polo (men)
- List of world champions in men's water polo
- List of World Aquatics Championships medalists in water polo
