= Aleksandar Šapić =

Serbian politician and water polo player (born 1978)

- Александар Шапић
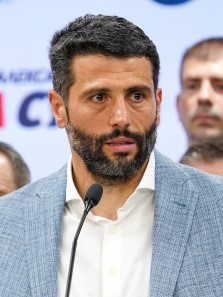
- Šapić in 2024

Mayor of Belgrade
- Incumbent
- Assumed office 24 June 2024
- Preceded by: Temporary Council
- In office 20 June 2022 – 30 October 2023
- Deputy: Vesna Vidović
- Preceded by: Zoran Radojičić
- Succeeded by: Temporary Council

President of the New Belgrade Municipality
- In office 27 June 2012 – 27 June 2022
- Preceded by: Nenad Milenković
- Succeeded by: Bojan Bovan

Personal details
- Born: 1 June 1978 (age 48) Belgrade, SR Serbia, Yugoslavia
- Party: DS (2006–2014); SPAS (2018–2021); SNS (2021–present)
- Spouse: Milica Šapić
- Children: 2
- Education: Megatrend University
- Occupation: Politician; professional athlete; actor
- Website: sapic.rs
- Water polo career
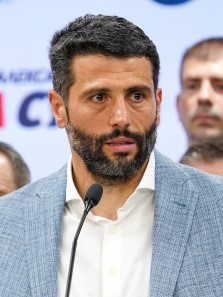
- Height: 188 cm (74 in)
- Weight: 100 kg (220 lb)
- Sport: Water polo

Youth career
- Years: Team
- 1984–1991: Crvena Zvezda

Senior clubs
- Years: Team
- 1991–1992: Partizan
- 1992–1994: Crvena Zvezda
- 1994–2001: Bečej
- 2001–2004: Camogli
- 2004–2006: Savona
- 2006–2009: Shturm 2002
National team
Years	Team	Apps	(Gls)
1995–2008	Serbia	385	(981)
Medal record
Men's water polo
Representing FR Yugoslavia, Serbia and Montenegro and Serbia
Olympic Games
Silver medal – second place	2004 Athens
Bronze medal – third place	2000 Sydney
Bronze medal – third place	2008 Beijing
World Championship
Gold medal – first place	2005 Montreal
Silver medal – second place	2001 Fukuoka
Bronze medal – third place	1998 Perth
Bronze medal – third place	2003 Barcelona
European Championship
Gold medal – first place	2001 Budapest
Gold medal – first place	2003 Kranj
Gold medal – first place	2006 Belgrade
Silver medal – second place	1997 Seville
Silver medal – second place	2008 Málaga
FINA World League
Gold medal – first place	2005 Belgrade
Gold medal – first place	2006 Athens
Gold medal – first place	2007 Berlin
Gold medal – first place	2008 Genova
Silver medal – second place	2004 Long Beach
FINA World Cup
Gold medal – first place	2006 Budapest
Bronze medal – third place	2002 Belgrade
Mediterranean Games
Gold medal – first place	1997 Bari

Aleksandar Šapić (Serbian Cyrillic: Александар Шапић; born 1 June 1978) is a Serbian politician and former professional water polo player who has been the mayor of Belgrade since 2024, previously serving that role from 2022 to 2023. A member and current vice-president of the Serbian Progressive Party (SNS), Šapić had previously served as president of the New Belgrade municipality from 2012 to 2022.

Šapić was previously a member of the Democratic Party (DS) until 2014, and he later led the Serbian Patriotic Alliance until the merger into SNS which occurred in May 2021. During his professional water polo career, he played for two Olympic bronze medal squads, one for FR Yugoslavia at the 2000 Olympics in Sydney, the other for Serbia at the 2008 Olympics in Beijing, and one Olympic silver medal squad for Serbia and Montenegro at the 2004 Olympics in Athens.

== Education ==
Šapić graduated from the Megatrend University Faculty for Management in 2003, received his master's degree in 2009 and tried to defend his Ph.D. dissertation in 2012, in the field of industrial management. His doctoral thesis has gained public attention in 2014, when a number of experts claimed that it contained plagiarised parts.

== Water polo career ==
=== Club career ===
Šapić started playing water polo in 1984, in WC Crvena Zvezda where he played for all young categories teams. He transferred to WC Partizan in 1991, not yet fourteen he made his senior debut in 1992. He returned to WC Crvena Zvezda in 1993 and he continued his career in WC Bečej starting 1994. In 2001, he moved to Italy, WC Camogli, where he spent three seasons, and after that, he transferred to WC Rari Nantes Savona. He left Italy in 2006 when he went to Russian water polo club Shturm 2002 where he signed a contract that made him the best-paid player in water polo history.

During his club career, Šapić won 21 trophies of which 9 National Championship (6 he won in SRY, 2 in Russia and 1 in Italy). He also won National Cups 9 times (7 National Cups of SRY and 2 National Cups of Russia). He once won LEN Euroleague and twice LEN CUP.

Between 1996 and 2009, Šapić was the leagues' top scorer fourteen times in a row, 6 times in SRY, 5 times in Italy, and 3 times in Russia. During his club career he scored 1.694 goals, most of the number 924 he scored for clubs in SRY, in Italian league he scored 494 times and in Russia 276 times.

Šapić finished his professional water polo career in 2009.

Club titles (21)

- 9 National Championships – 6 SRY, 2 Russia, 1 Italy
- 9 National Cups- 7 SRY, 2 Russia
- 2 LEN Cups
- 1 LEN Euroleague

14 consecutive top-scorer titles 1996–2009

- National Championship of Yugoslavia Top Scorer (6): 1995–96, 1996–97, 1997–98, 1998–99, 1999–2000, 2000–01
- Serie A1 Top Scorer (5): 2001–02, 2002–03, 2003–04, 2004–05, 2005–06
- Russian Championship Top Scorer (3): 2006–07, 2007–08, 2008–09
- LEN Champions League Top Scorer (2): 1999–2000, 2002–03
- Olympic Games Top Scorer (3): 2000 Sydney:2004 Athens : 2008 Beijing
- Best Sportsman by OCS (1): 2004
- World Championship MVP (1): 2005 Montreal
- World Championship Top Scorer (2):2003 Barcelona : 2005 Montreal
- European Championship Top Scorer (3): 2003 Kranj, 2006 Belgrade, 2008 Málaga
- World Cup Top Scorer (1): 2006 Budapest
- Serbia's sport association "May Award" : 2008

Number of scored goals

- SRY (Crvena zvezda, Becej) – 924
- Italy (Camogli, Rari Nantes Savona) – 494
- Russia (Shturm 2002) – 276

=== National team career ===
Šapić made his debut for the national team of Yugoslavia in December 1995 when he was only seventeen, and played for them until 2008. At the very start of his national team career, Yugoslavia won two European U19 championships – 1995 in Esslingen and 1996 in Istanbul – and Šapić was the best player and top scorer in both.

Šapić took part in his first major competition at the age of eighteen, the 1996 Summer Olympics in Atlanta. He would play for the national team in the Olympic Games four times and he went on to win three Olympic medals, bronze when representing Yugoslavia at the 2000 Olympics in Sydney, silver for Serbia and Montenegro at the 2004 Olympics in Athens, and another bronze medal when playing for Serbia at the 2008 Olympics in Beijing.

With the national team of Yugoslavia, later Serbia and Montenegro, and finally Serbia, Šapić played in 22 sports tournaments overall, winning a total of 20 medals, five of which were from the European Championships, four from the World Championships and three from the Olympic Games. He won two medals in the World Cup, five in World League tournaments, and he won a gold medal in the 1997 Mediterranean Games in Bari.

Šapić scored 981 goals in 385 games that he played for the national team. He was twice top scorer in the Olympic Games. Šapić ranks third on the all-time scoring list in Olympic history, with 64 goals. He was four times top scorer of both the World Championship and the European Championship. He was also four times the top scorer of the World League tournaments and he won the title of top scorer twice in the World Cup.

During his national team career, the team was named "ideal team" eight times in the tournaments that he played in, three times in both the World and European Championships, and twice in the Olympic Games.

World Championship

- 1998 – bronze medal – top scorer – ideal team
- 2001 – silver medal – top scorer – ideal team
- 2003 – bronze medal – top scorer
- 2005 – gold medal – MVP and top scorer – ideal team
- 2007 – 4th place

European Championship

- 1997 – silver medal
- 2001 – gold medal – top scorer – ideal team
- 2003 – gold medal – MVP – ideal team
- 2006 – gold medal – top scorer – ideal team
- 2008 – silver medal – top scorer

Olympic Games

- 1996 – 8th place
- 2000 – bronze medal – top scorer – ideal team
- 2004 – silver medal – top scorer – ideal team
- 2008 – bronze medal

World League

- 2004 – silver medal – top scorer
- 2005 – gold medal – top scorer
- 2006 – gold medal
- 2007 – gold medal – top scorer
- 2008 – gold medal – top scorer

World Cup

- 2002 – bronze medal – top scorer
- 2006 – gold medal – top scorer

Mediterranean Games

- 1997 – gold medal

Number of scored goals

- National team (SRY, SMne, Serbia) – 981
- Number of goals scored in career – 2675

Top scorer

- 2 times top scorer Olympic Games
- 4 times top scorer European Championship
- 4 times top scorer World League
- 2 times top scorer World Cup

Ideal team

- 8 times chosen in ideal team (OG, WC, EC)

=== Post-retirement career ===
Šapić was the president of the water polo club VK Crvena zvezda from 2003 to 2004. After finishing his career as a player in the Italian club RN Savona, he continued working for the club as a sports manager for European competitions in the period from 2006 until 2014. In 2015, he founded VK Novi Beograd which became one of the top-tier European clubs within ten years, and regular participant of the Champions League.

In February 2016, Šapić donated all the medals he won in his water polo career to a charity auction.

== Political career ==
Šapić was the assistant of the mayor Dragan Đilas from 2009 to 2012. He was elected the president of New Belgrade municipality in 2012 and he was reelected in 2016. He is still the president of the biggest municipality in Belgrade. He ran in the Belgrade Assembly elections in 2018, as a mayoral candidate. Šapić stated that he is not interested in pre-election coalitions, and that he will compete alone, as an independent candidate. His list took third place with 9,09% (12 seats in the assembly).

In 2018, Šapić founded the right-wing Serbian Patriotic Alliance (SPAS). In the 2020 parliamentary election, SPAS won 3.83% of the votes and 11 seats in the National Assembly, becoming part of the ruling coalition led by the Serbian Progressive Party (SNS).

In May 2021, Šapić merged SPAS with the ruling SNS and became its vice-president. In June 2022, he was elected as the mayor of Belgrade with a narrow majority of 57 votes out of 110 city assembly deputies. He pledged to work for the interests of all people of Belgrade and to continue the projects of urban development, public transportation, environmental protection and social welfare.

Šapić was criticised for not attending a commemoration ceremony for the victims of the Belgrade school shooting on 3 May 2023, which occurred at Vladislav Ribnikar Model Elementary School in Vračar, resulted in the deaths of ten people, including nine students and a security guard, and injuries to six others. Instead, Šapić and the city authorities organised their own commemoration.

In 2021, millions of euros intended for lectures on preventing peer and digital violence, the first year post the coronavirus pandemic outbreak, were designated by the Ministry of Family Care and Demography. However, these funds were funnelled to phantom associations, each receiving an average of 210,000 euros. BIRN's investigation uncovers that these phantom entities, financially supported by Šapić's associates over the years, diverted the allocated funds. Instead of utilising the money for lectures in schools across 17 cities in Serbia, the funds were redirected to numerous private agencies owned by their relatives, friends, neighbours, and acquaintances.

In April 2023, Šapić faced allegations of corruption and abuse of power after audio recordings of his chief of staff Nenad Milanović offering a deal to the Turkish company Kentkart, which provides ticketing services for public transportation in Belgrade, were revealed to the public. According to the recordings, Milanović proposed that Kentkart agree to terminate its existing contract from 2021 and in return, he would arrange a new public procurement for them. Kentkart rejected the offer and accused Milanović of trying to involve them in illegal activities. Šapić denied any wrongdoing and said that he was happy that the prosecution would investigate the case. He also claimed that Kentkart had been overcharging the city for years and that he intended to end their contract and sue them for damages. On 29 September 2023, Šapić formally resigned from the office of mayor, but remained as the caretaker mayor until the next local election. It was reported that his Serbian Progressive Party ordered the resignation of certain SNS mayors across the country to allow it to compete in snap election that would be held concurrently with one in Vojvodina province on 17 December. The SNS returned as the largest party in the assembly, but did not gain a majority. Failing form a government, another snap election was scheduled for 2 June 2024 which Šapić's coalition won, with the assembly returning him as mayor on 24 June.

Šapić was criticised in September 2024 for proposing a plan to create a monument to the World War II Chetnik leader Draža Mihailović; the Socialist Party of Serbia and fellow SNS ministers criticised this move. In the same speech, Šapić stated that he would call for the removal of Josip Broz Tito's mausoleum, the House of Flowers, from the Museum of Yugoslavia, as well as the Tomb of People's Heroes from Kalemegdan Park. Vojislav Mihailović, the grandson of Draža Mihailović and leader of POKS, described the announcement as "manipulative".

On 3 December 2024, in a surprise announcement, Šapić announced he would not be running for re-election at the assembly election scheduled for 2027.

== Personal life ==
Šapić is married and a father of two sons. He lives and works in Belgrade. He speaks Serbian, Russian, Italian, and English.

Šapić appeared in the 2004 Serbian film When I Grow Up, I'll Be a Kangaroo, portraying the role of a local neighbourhood heavy named Gangula. He took part in the humanitarian TV program Ples sa zvezdama, a Serbian version of Dancing with the Stars.

On 28 September 2026, Šapić reportedly attacked an Kreni-Promeni activist and is under investigation by Third Court of Belgrade for the incident. Šapić claims that the activist attacked him first and apologized to SNS and Aleksandar Vučić for his involvement in the conflict.

== See also ==
- Serbia men's Olympic water polo team records and statistics
- Serbia and Montenegro men's Olympic water polo team records and statistics
- List of Olympic medalists in water polo (men)
- List of players who have appeared in multiple men's Olympic water polo tournaments
- List of men's Olympic water polo tournament top goalscorers
- List of world champions in men's water polo
- List of World Aquatics Championships medalists in water polo

Awards
Preceded by (Italy) Roberto Calcaterra	Most Valuable Player of Water Polo World Championship; 2005	Succeeded by (Spain) Guillermo Molina
