= Vladimir Vujasinović =

Serbian water polo player

Personal information
- Nationality: Serbian
- Born: 14 August 1973 (age 53) Rijeka, SR Croatia, SFR Yugoslavia

Sport
- Sport: Water polo
- Current club: Serbian national team (head coach)

Senior clubs
- Years: Team
- 1989–1991: Primorje
- 1991–1994: Crvena zvezda
- 1994–1997: Barcelona
- 1997–1998: Partizan
- 1998–2001: Roma Pallanuoto
- 2001–2008: Pro Recco
- 2008–2012: Partizan

Teams coached
- 2012–2016?: Serbian national team (assistant)
- 2013–2016: Partizan
- 2016–2018: Pro Recco
- 2019–2022: Novi Beograd
- 2026–present: Serbian national team
Medal record
Men's water polo
Representing FR Yugoslavia, Serbia and Montenegro and Serbia
Olympic Games
Silver medal – second place	2004 Athens
Bronze medal – third place	2000 Sydney
Bronze medal – third place	2008 Beijing
World Championships
Gold medal – first place	2005 Montreal
Silver medal – second place	2001 Fukuoka
Bronze medal – third place	1998 Perth
Bronze medal – third place	2003 Barcelona
European Championship
Gold medal – first place	2001 Budapest
Gold medal – first place	2003 Kranj
Gold medal – first place	2006 Belgrade
Silver medal – second place	1997 Seville
Silver medal – second place	2008 Málaga
FINA World League
Silver medal – second place	2004 Long Beach
Gold medal – first place	2005 Belgrade
Gold medal – first place	2006 Athens
Gold medal – first place	2008 Genova
FINA World Cup
Bronze medal – third place	2002 Belgrade
Mediterranean Games
Gold medal – first place	1997 Bari
Bronze medal – third place	2005 Almeria
Universiade
Gold medal – first place	1995 Fukuoka

Vladimir Vujasinović (Serbian Cyrillic: Владимир Вујасиновић; pronounced [ʋlǎdimiːr ʋujasǐːnɔʋit͡ɕ]; born 14 August 1973) is a Serbian professional water polo head coach and former player. He currently serves as head coach of the Serbian national team.

During his playing career, he won two Olympic bronze medals (FR Yugoslavia team at 2000 Olympics and Serbia team at 2008 Olympics), an Olympic silver medal (Serbia and Montenegro team at 2004 Olympics), and numerous other titles. He has been named best water polo player in the world several times. In 2003 he was pronounced the best athlete of Serbia and Montenegro, and in 2005 the Olympic Committee of Serbia and Montenegro declared him to be the best sportsman. Vujasinović has played 341 matches for his country and scored 391 times. In 2011, his then club VK Partizan won the National Championship and National Cup of Serbia, LEN Euroleague (his fourth overall), LEN Super Cup (his third overall), Eurointer League and Tom Hoad Cup.

== Early life ==
Vladimir Vujasinović was born on 14 August 1973 in Rijeka, SFR Yugoslavia (modern Croatia), to ethnic Serb parents hailing from Ivoševci village near Knin. He grew up in Istria.

== Playing career ==
Vujasinović debuted for the national team in Kotor scoring his first goal against France in an 18–3 win. He was 17 years, three months and 22 days old. From 1995. he was a permanent member of the national team, and a captain since 2003. During this period, Vladimir only missed the 1999 European championship after a doping scandal after the Italian Cup semi-final. In numerous surveys, he was elected as the world's best water polo player on the grounds that he can play equally well in all positions for the team. Forerunner of all-round player, he was a member of all possible ideal setups. He retired from the national team in 2008. Vujasinović is considered to be one of the best players in the history of world water polo. He played for Croatian Primorje, Serbian VK Crvena zvezda, Spanish Barcelona, Italian A.S. Roma Pallanuoto, Serbian VK Partizan, Italian Pro Recco, Brazilian Fluminense. In summer 2007 he played with Maltese side Neptunes WPSC and helped them retain the Maltese First Division. He was named Most Valuable Player at the 2001 European Championship in Budapest, Hungary. Vujasinović won European Champions League several times with Italian Pro Recco (year 2007 and 2008) and Serbian VK Partizan. He rejoined Partizan Belgrade for the 2008/9 season. He won the Malta Waterpolo Summer League title with Neptunes Emirates (St. Julians, Malta) in August 2010.

=== Neptunes WPSC ===
Efforts to strengthen the team and try to retain the championship in 2007 were made immediately after the 2006 season ended. Vlado Vujasinović was recruited from Italian side Pro Recco. Sergio Afric’s initial reaction to the club president was "Abbiamo appena vinto il prossimo campionato!". Vujasinović had success working alongside his colleagues by marshalling at the back. His play-making was significant in Neptunes offensive stints. The final game that wrapped up the championship for Neptunes achieved a 12-4 victory over Sliema, which was their biggest win.

=== Partizan ===
2011–12 season On 22 October 2011. Vujasinović scored two goals in the first round of the Euroleague Group, in an 8–9 loss to Szeged Beton VE. On 9 November Vujasinović scored a goal in the second round of the Euroleague Group in the 10–10 tie against TEVA-Vasas-UNIQA. On 26 November Vujasinović scored a goal in a 9–6 Euroleague third round win over ZF Eger in Belgrade. On 30 December Vujasinović won with Partizan the ninth "Tom Hoad Cup" in Perth, defeating in the final the Australian team, Fremantle Mariners 11–9. He led his rejuvenated team to the victory with no Serbia men's national water polo team representatives as a captain. On 15 February 2012. Vujasinović scored his first goal of the Serbian National Championship season, in the second round of the "A League", in an 8–6 win against Crvena zvezda VET. On 17 February Vujasinović scored in the third round of the "A League", in an easy 14–2 win against ŽAK. On 26 February Vujasinović scored his last two goals in the final round of the Euroleague Group, in which his team lost by 9–8 to Szeged Beton VE and dropped out of the competition. On 1 March he scored two goals against VK Vojvodina in a 10–9 win in the "A League" fourth round.

Vujasinović has additionally had summer league club stints in Malta and Brazil with Neptunes WPSC and Fluminense, respectively.

== Coaching career ==
Vladimir Vujasinović named as assistant coach of Serbian national team in 2012. During the Olympics cycle until 2016, he won 2016 Olympic Games, 2015 World Championship, two European Championships (2014, 2016) and four World League title (2013, 2014, 2015, and 2016).

=== Partizan (2013–16) ===
Vujasinović led VK Partizan from the 2013–14 season. He won two Serbian League titles twice (in 2014–15 and 2015–16) and was twice in the semifinal in Champions League, with the youngest team in the competition. He left the club in June 2016.

=== Pro Recco (2016–18) ===
In 2016, Vujasinović signed a three-year contract with Italian Pro Recco, but stayed there for two seasons, until June 2018. With Pro Recco, he won the Italian League twice (in 2016–17 and 2017–18).

=== Novi Beograd (2019–22) ===
On July 1, 2019, he was named a new head coach of VK Novi Beograd. In January 2022, he parted ways with the club.

=== Serbia national team (2026–present) ===
On June 6, 2026, he was named new head coach of Serbia national team.

== Honours ==
=== Club ===
Crvena zvezda

- National Championship of Yugoslavia (2) : 1991–92, 1992–93

CN Barcelona

- División de Honor de Waterpolo (3) : 1994–95, 1995–96, 1996–97
- Copa del Rey (2) : 1994–95, 1995–96
- LEN Cup (1) : 1994–95

AS Roma Pallanuoto

- Serie A1 (1) : 1998–99

Pro Recco

- Serie A1 (4) : 2001–02, 2005–06, 2006–07, 2007–08
- Coppa Italia (3) : 2005–06, 2006–07, 2007–08
- Trofeo del Giocatore (1) : 2003
- LEN Euroleague (3) : 2002–03, 2006–07, 2007–08
- LEN Supercup (2) : 2003–04, 2007–08

Neptunes WPSC

- National Championship of Malta (1) : 2007

PA Fluminense

- National Championship of Brazil (1) : 2009

Partizan

- National Championship of Serbia (4) : 2008–09, 2009–10, 2010–11, 2011–12
- National Cup of Serbia (4) : 2008–09, 2009–10, 2010–11, 2011–12
- LEN Euroleague (1) : 2010–11
- LEN Supercup (1) : 2011–12
- LEN Cup (1) : 1997–98
- Eurointer League (2) : 2009–10, 2010–11
- Tom Hoad Cup (1) : 2011

=== Individual ===
- European Championship MVP (1): 2001 Budapest
- FINA Athlete of the Year in men's water polo (1): 2001
- Golden Badge (1): 2003
- Best Sportsman by OCS (1): 2005

== See also ==
- Serbia men's Olympic water polo team records and statistics
- Serbia and Montenegro men's Olympic water polo team records and statistics
- List of Olympic medalists in water polo (men)
- List of players who have appeared in multiple men's Olympic water polo tournaments
- List of men's Olympic water polo tournament top goalscorers
- List of world champions in men's water polo
- List of World Aquatics Championships medalists in water polo

Sporting positions
Preceded by Aleksandar Šoštar	Serbia and Montenegro / Serbia captain 2003–2008	Succeeded by Vanja Udovičić
Awards
Preceded by Dejan Bodiroga (FR Yugoslavia)	The Best Athlete of Serbia and Montenegro; 2003	Succeeded by Denis Šefik
