= Vujanović =

Vujanović (Serbian Cyrillic: Вујановић) is a Serbian and Montenegrin surname, derived from the male given name Vujan, a variant of Vujadin. Notable people with the surname include:

- Dragan Vujanović (born 1946), Bosnian footballer
- Filip Vujanović (born 1954), Montenegrin politician
- Goran Vujanović (born 1977), Croatian footballer
- Igor Vujanović (born 1978), Bosnian Serb footballer
- Luka Vujanović (born 1994), Montenegrin footballer
- Radovan Vujanović (born 1982), Austrian-Serbian footballer

== See also ==
- Vujadinović
- Vujanić
