= Dénes Kemény =

Hungarian water polo player

Personal information
- Born: June 14, 1954 (age 72) Budapest, Hungary

Sport
- Sport: Water polo
Medal record
Representing Hungary
Olympic Games
Gold medal – first place	2000 Sydney	Team competition
Gold medal – first place	2004 Athens	Team competition
Gold medal – first place	2008 Beijing	Team competition
World Championships
Gold medal – first place	2003 Barcelona	Team competition
Silver medal – second place	1998 Perth	Team competition
Silver medal – second place	2005 Montréal	Team
Silver medal – second place	2007 Melbourne	Team
European Championship
Gold medal – first place	1997 Seville	Team competition
Gold medal – first place	1999 Florence	Team competition
Silver medal – second place	2006 Belgrade	Team competition
Bronze medal – third place	2001 Budapest	Team competition
Bronze medal – third place	2003 Kranj	Team competition
Bronze medal – third place	2008 Málaga	Team competition
Bronze medal – third place	2012 Eindhoven	Team competition
FINA World League
Gold medal – first place	2003 New York	Team competition
Gold medal – first place	2004 Long Beach	Team competition
Silver medal – second place	2005 Belgrade	Team competition
Silver medal – second place	2007 Berlin	Team competition
Silver medal – second place	2002 Patras	Team competition
FINA World Cup
Gold medal – first place	1999 Sydney	Team competition
Silver medal – second place	2002 Belgrade	Team competition
Silver medal – second place	2006 Budapest	Team competition
Bronze medal – third place	1997 Athens	Team competition

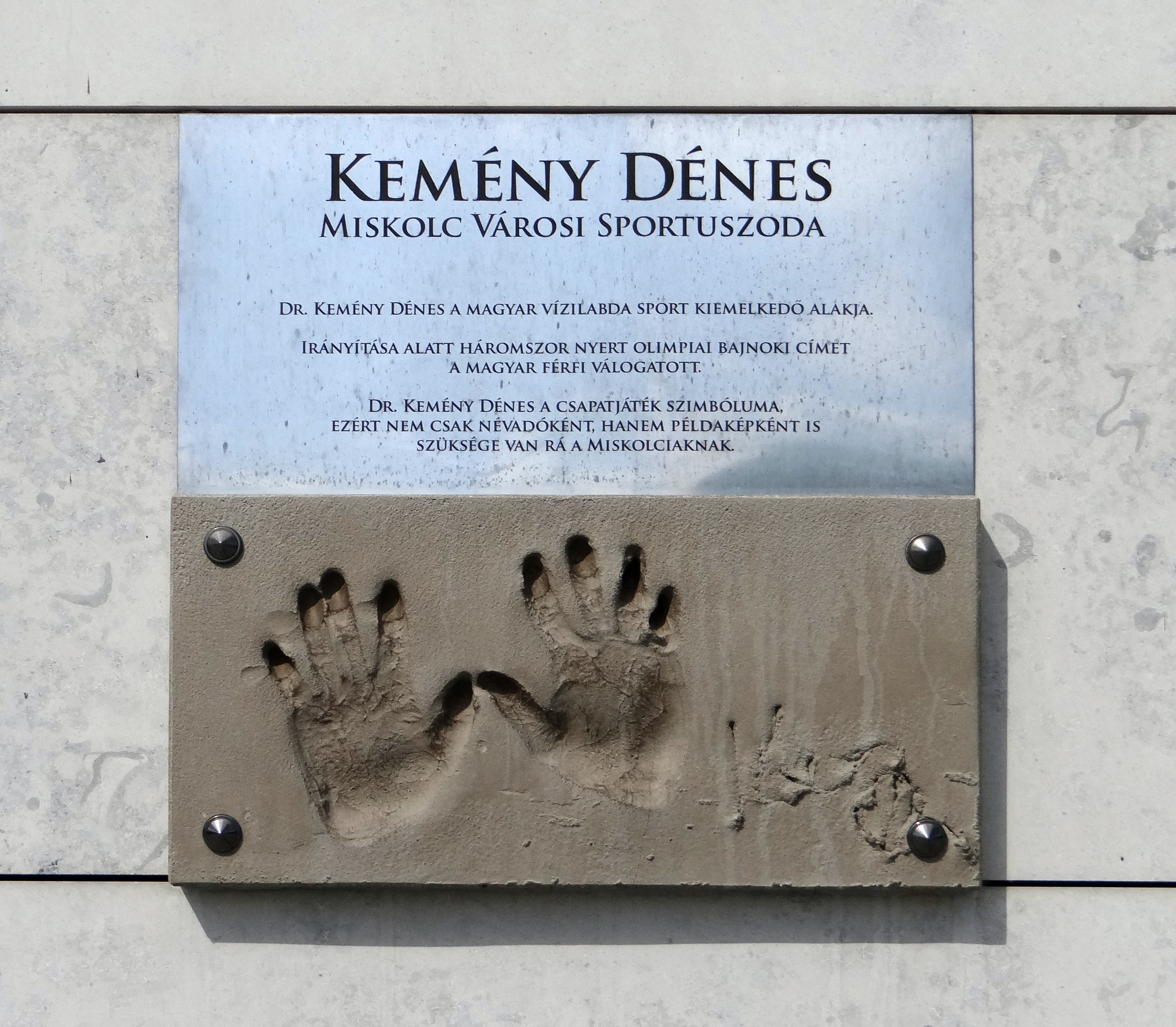
Palm prints of Dénes Kemény, Dénes Kemény Swimming Pool, Miskolc, Hungary

Dénes Kemény (born 14 June 1954) is a former Hungarian water polo player who was the trainer and president of the Hungary men's national water polo team from 1997 to 2012. During his reign the Hungarian team won at least a medal in 24 of its 29 major tournaments, including three Olympic golds in a row between 2000 and 2008, making him one of the most successful water polo coaches in Olympic history.

Kemény graduated in 1978 as a veterinary doctor. In 1990 he received his degree which made him a water polo trainer, and in 1998 a water polo master trainer. As a player, he was a member of the European Junior Champion team in Duisburg in 1973. Under his leadership the Hungarian national team became one of the most successful teams in the world winning the Olympic Games in 2000, 2004 and 2008, the Water Polo World Championship in 2003, the FINA Water Polo World League in 2003 and 2004, the FINA Water Polo World Cup in 1999, and the Water Polo European Championship in 1997 and 1999.

He was granted the Hungarian Sports President of the Year award five times (1999, 2000, 2003, 2004, 2008).

== See also ==
- Hungary men's Olympic water polo team records and statistics
- List of Olympic champions in men's water polo
- List of world champions in men's water polo
- List of members of the International Swimming Hall of Fame
