= Slobodan Nikić =

Serbian water polo player

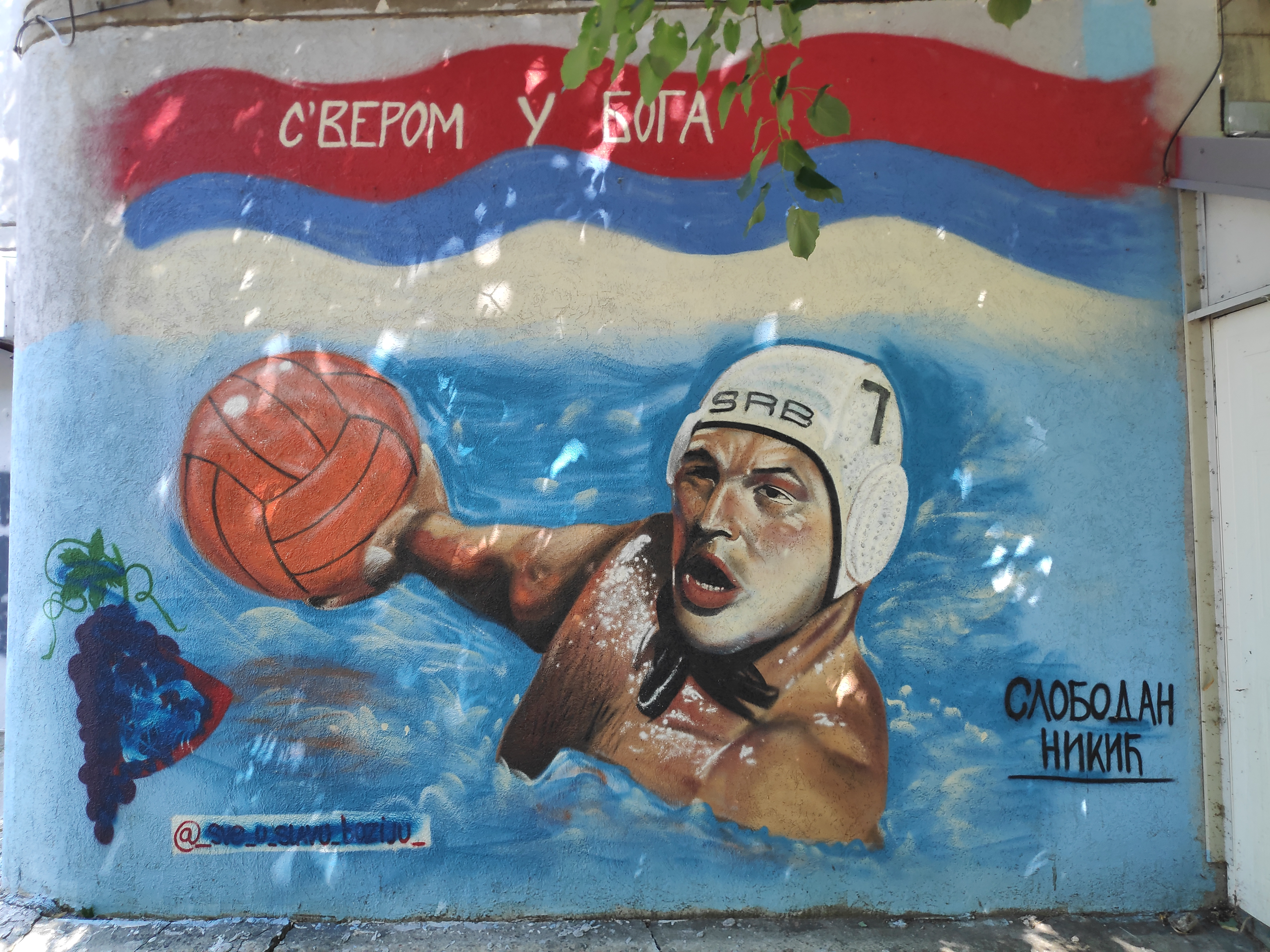

Personal information
- Nationality: Serbian
- Born: 25 January 1983 (age 43) Zrenjanin, SR Serbia, SFR Yugoslavia
- Height: 1.97 m (6 ft 6 in)
- Weight: 106 kg (234 lb)

Sport
- Sport: Water polo
Medal record
Olympic Games
Gold medal – first place	2016 Rio de Janeiro
Silver medal – second place	2004 Athens
Bronze medal – third place	2012 London
World Championship
Gold medal – first place	2005 Montreal
Gold medal – first place	2009 Rome
Gold medal – first place	2015 Kazan
Silver medal – second place	2011 Shanghai
Bronze medal – third place	2003 Barcelona
European Championship
Gold medal – first place	2003 Kranj
Gold medal – first place	2006 Belgrade
Gold medal – first place	2012 Eindhoven
Gold medal – first place	2014 Budapest
Gold medal – first place	2016 Belgrade
Silver medal – second place	2008 Málaga
Bronze medal – third place	2010 Zagreb
FINA World League
Gold medal – first place	2005 Belgrade
Gold medal – first place	2006 Athens
Gold medal – first place	2007 Berlin
Gold medal – first place	2008 Genova
Gold medal – first place	2010 Niš
Gold medal – first place	2011 Firenze
Gold medal – first place	2013 Chelyabinsk
Gold medal – first place	2014 Dubai
Gold medal – first place	2015 Bergamo
Silver medal – second place	2004 Long Beach
Bronze medal – third place	2009 Podgorica
FINA World Cup
Gold medal – first place	2006 Budapest
Gold medal – first place	2010 Oreada
Mediterranean Games
Gold medal – first place	2009 Pescara

Slobodan Nikić (Serbian Cyrillic: Слободан Никић; born 25 January 1983) is a Serbian professional water polo player. He is currently free agent and he is a long-standing member of the Serbia men's national water polo team. His most notable achievements with the national team are the gold medal from the Olympic Games in 2016, silver from the Olympic Games in 2004 and bronze from the Olympic Games 2012, three gold medals from the World Championships in 2005, 2009 and 2015, and five gold medals from the European Championships in 2003, 2006, 2012, 2014, and finally in 2016.

He is one of the most decorated players in the history of water polo, and the only water polo player in the world to have won 3 FINA World Championship gold medals, an all-time record as of 2025. In his club career, his most important achievements are the LEN Euroleague and the LEN Supercup won in 2010 with Pro Recco. Nikić is one of the most successful Serbian Olympians.

== National career ==
=== 2012 Samaridis Cup ===
From 9 to 11 January 2012. Nikić competed with his national team on the Greek island of Chios in the Samaridis Cup which was more a like preparation tournament for the upcoming 2012 European Championship held in Eindhoven. He and his team-mates finished second behind the Montenegrins on goal difference.

=== 2012 Eindhoven ===
Nikić scored his first goal at the European Championship on 17 January against Germany in a second game which the Serbs won by 13–12. On 19 January, in a third game of the tournament, Nikić scored his second goal in a difficult 15–12 victory against the defending European champions Croatia. On 21 January in the fourth match, Nikić scored his third goal of the tournament for his national team in a routine victory against Romania 14–5. On 29 January, Nikić won the European Championship with his national team beating in the final Montenegro by 9–8. This was his third gold medal at the European Championships.

== Honours ==
=== Club ===
Olympiacos

- Greek Championship: 2007, 2008, 2009
- Greek Cup: 2006, 2007, 2008, 2009

Pro Recco

- Serie A1: 2009–10, 2010–11
- Coppa Italia: 2009–10, 2010–11
- LEN Euroleague: 2009–10
- LEN Supercup: 2010

Ferencváros

- LEN Euro Cup: 2017–18
- Hungarian Championship (OB I): 2018

== See also ==
- Serbia men's Olympic water polo team records and statistics
- Serbia and Montenegro men's Olympic water polo team records and statistics
- List of Olympic champions in men's water polo
- List of Olympic medalists in water polo (men)
- List of world champions in men's water polo
- List of World Aquatics Championships medalists in water polo
