= Branko Peković =

Serbian water polo player

Personal information
- Born: 7 May 1979 (age 47) Belgrade, Yugoslavia

Sport
- Sport: Water polo
Medal record
Representing Serbia
Olympic Games
Bronze medal – third place	2008 Beijing
World Championships
Silver medal – second place	2001 Fukuoka
European Championship
Gold medal – first place	2001 Budapest
Gold medal – first place	2006 Belgrade
Silver medal – second place	1997 Seville
Silver medal – second place	2008 Malaga
FINA World League
Gold medal – first place	2006 Athens
Gold medal – first place	2008 Genova
Representing Kazakhstan
Asian Games
Gold medal – first place	2014 Bangkok

Branko Peković (born 7 May 1979) is a Serbian water polo player now representing Kazakhstan. He was a member of the Serbia men's national water polo team which won the bronze medal at the 2008 Beijing Olympics.

== Club ==
VK Bečej Naftagas

- LEN Euroleague (1): 1999–2000

== See also ==
- List of Olympic medalists in water polo (men)
- List of World Aquatics Championships medalists in water polo
