= 2006 FINA Men's Water Polo World Cup =

- League: FINA Water Polo World Cup
- Sport: Water polo
- Duration: 13 – 18 June

Super Final
- Finals champions: Serbia and Montenegro
- Runners-up: Hungary

FINA Water Polo World Cup seasons
- ← 2002 2010 →

The 13th edition of the FINA Men's Water Polo World Cup was held in the Alfréd Hajós Swimming Pool on Margitsziget (Margaret Island) in Budapest, Hungary, from 13 to 18 June 2006.

== Teams ==
The top eight teams from the previous World Aquatic Championship have qualified.

Teams	Qualified as
Hungary; Serbia and Montenegro; Greece; Croatia; Spain; Romania; Russia; Italy	Host (2nd 2005 World Championship); 1st 2005 World Championship; 3rd 2005 World Championship; 4th 2005 World Championship; 5th 2005 World Championship; 6th 2005 World Championship; 7th 2005 World Championship; 8th 2005 World Championship

== Seeding ==
Following ranking of the 2005 World Championship

Pot 1	Pot 2	Pot 3	Pot 4
Serbia and Montenegro (1); Hungary (2) (H)	Greece (3); Croatia (4)	Spain (5); Romania (6)	Russia (7); Italy (8)

== Groups ==
GROUP A	GROUP B
Hungary (H); Greece; Romania; Italy	Serbia and Montenegro; Croatia; Spain; Russia

== Preliminary round ==
=== Group A ===
	Team	Pts	P	W	T	L	PF	PA	Qualification
1.	Hungary (H)	6	3	3	0	0	38	19	Semi-finals
2.	Italy	4	3	2	0	1	20	20	Quarter-finals
3.	Romania	2	3	1	0	2	19	28	Quarter-finals
4.	Greece	0	3	0	0	3	19	29	

- Tuesday 2005-06-13

Greece	7 – 8	Romania	2-3 • 2-1 • 1-1 • 2-3
Italy	6 – 10	Hungary	2-2 • 1-2 • 1-3 • 2-3

- Wednesday 2005-06-14

Greece	4 – 14	Hungary	4-4 • 2-3 • 0-4 • 1-3
Italy	7 – 5	Romania	1-1 • 2-1 • 1-1 • 3-2

- Thursday 2005-06-15

Greece	5 – 7	Italy	1-1 • 3-1 • 1-4 • 0-1
Romania	6 – 14	Hungary	4-5 • 1-3 • 0-3 • 1-3

=== Group B ===
	Team	Pts	P	W	T	L	PF	PA	Qualification
1.	Serbia and Montenegro	6	3	3	0	0	29	21	Semi-finals
2.	Croatia	3	3	1	1	1	28	26	Quarter-finals
3.	Spain	3	3	1	1	1	24	21	Quarter-finals
4.	Russia	0	3	0	0	3	22	35	

- Tuesday 2005-06-13

Croatia	12 – 9	Russia	4-3 • 1-3 • 4-2 • 3-1
Serbia and Montenegro	7 – 6	Spain	2-4 • 2-0 • 2-2 • 1-0

- Wednesday 2005-06-14

Croatia	8 – 8	Spain	2-3 • 2-1 • 3-2 • 1-2
Serbia and Montenegro	13 – 7	Russia	3-1 • 4-4 • 2-0 • 4-2

- Thursday 2005-06-15

Russia	6 – 10	Spain	1-3 • 2-2 • 1-2 • 2-3
Croatia	8 – 9	Serbia and Montenegro	1-3 • 2-0 • 2-4 • 3-2

- Olympic champions Hungary and reigning world champion Serbia & Montenegro won their groups after three wins in a row and went straight to the semifinals on Saturday.

== Quarter finals ==
- Friday 2005-06-16
  - First quarterfinal (17:30h)

Romania	7 – 10	Croatia	2-2 • 2-2 • 3-4 • 0-2

  - Second quarterfinal (19:00h)

Italy	3 – 9	Spain	0-1 • 0-4 • 3-1 • 0-3

== Semi finals ==
- Saturday 2005-06-17
  - First semifinal (17:30h)

Hungary	10 – 6	Croatia	2-1 • 4-1 • 2-3 • 2-1

  - Second semifinal (19:00h)

Serbia and Montenegro	13 – 8	Spain	5-2 • 3-2 • 3-2 • 2-2

== Finals ==
- Friday 2005-06-16
  - 7th/8th-place match (15:00h)

Greece	10 – 6	Russia	2-2 • 3-2 • 3-2 • 2-0

- Saturday 2005-06-17
  - 5th/6th-place match (15:00h)

Romania	4 – 7	Italy	2-0 • 1-4 • 1-1 • 0-2

- Sunday 2005-06-18
  - Bronze Medal Match (15:30h)

Croatia	10 – 13	Spain	2-3 • 2-3 • 2-5 • 4-2

  - Gold Medal Match (17:30h)

Hungary	9 – 10	Serbia and Montenegro	1-3 • 2-2 • 2-1 • 3-2 • 1-1 • 0-1

== Final standings ==
RANK	TEAM
	Serbia
	Hungary
	Spain
4.	Croatia
5.	Italy
6.	Romania
7.	Greece
8.	Russia

2006 Men's FINA Water Polo World Cup

Serbia
First title

== Top scorers ==
RANK	2006 FINA MEN'S WATER POLO WORLD CUP	GOALS
1.	Aleksandar Šapić (SCG)	17
2.	Tamás Kásás (HUN)	13
2.	Felipe Perrone (ESP)	13
2.	Xavier García (ESP)	13
5.	Miho Bošković (CRO)	12
6.	Andrei Iosep (ROM)	11
7.	Péter Biros (HUN)	10
8.	Teo Đogaš (CRO)	9
9.	Gergely Kiss (HUN)	8
9.	Nikola Janović (SCG)	8

== Squads ==
=== Croatia ===
- Goran Volarević
- Damir Burić
- Boris Pavlović
- Srđan Antonijević
- Tihomil Vranješ
- Ratko Štritof (captain)
- Andrija Komadina
- Teo Đogaš
- Andro Bušlje
- Nikša Dobud
- Aljosa Kunac
- Miho Bošković
- Miro Kačić

Head coach:

- Ratko Rudić

=== Greece ===
- Filippos Karampetsos
- Anastasios Schizas
- Dimitrios Mazis
- Konstantinos Kokkinakis
- Christos Afroudakis
- Argyris Theodoropoulos
- Nikitas Kocheilas
- Georgios Ntoskas
- Georgios Afroudakis (captain)
- Andreas Miralis
- Konstantinos Dimou
- Manolis Mylonakis
- Georgios Reppas

Head coach:

- Alessandro Campagna

=== Hungary ===
- Zoltán Szécsi
- Dániel Varga
- Norbert Madaras
- Ádám Steinmetz
- Tamás Kásás (captain)
- Márton Szivós
- Gergely Kiss
- Csaba Kiss
- Rajmund Fodor
- Péter Biros
- Gábor Kiss
- Tamás Molnár
- Gábor Jászberényi

Head coach:

- Dénes Kemény

=== Italy ===
- Stefano Tempesti
- Massimo Giacoppo
- Valerio Rizzo
- Fabrizio Buonocore
- Andrea Scotti Galletta
- Maurizio Felugo
- Federico Mistrangelo
- Fabio Bencivenga
- Arnaldo Deserti
- Alessandro Calcaterra (captain)
- Luigi Di Costanzo
- Goran Fiorentini
- Fabio Violetti

Head coach:

- Paolo Malara

=== Romania ===
- Nenciu Berttini
- Cosmin Radu
- Florin Muşat
- Florin Bonca
- Andrei Iosep
- Andrei Bușilă
- Gheorghe Dunca
- Ramiro Georgescu
- Alexandru Ghiban
- George Georgescu
- Alexandru Matei Guiman
- Kálmán Kádár
- Robert Dinu

Head coach:

- Vlad Hagiu

=== Russia ===
- Igor Shaltanov
- Yuri Yatsev
- Pavel Khalturin
- Roman Dokuchaev
- Roman Balashov
- Anton Korotaev
- Revaz Chomakhidze (captain)
- Dmitri Stratan
- Aleksey Agarkov
- Marat Zakirov
- Viktor Vishnyakov
- Andrei Reketchinski
- Yegor Rastorguev

Head coach:

- Aleksandr Kabanov

=== Serbia and Montenegro ===
- Denis Šefik
- Živko Gocić
- Nikola Janović
- Filip Filipović
- Dejan Savić (captain)
- Danilo Ikodinović
- Slobodan Nikić
- Vladimir Gojković
- Aleksandar Ćirić
- Aleksandar Šapić
- Duško Pijetlović
- Predrag Jokić
- Zdravko Radić

Head coaches:

- Nenad Manojlović
- Petar Porobić
- Nebojša Novoselac

=== Spain ===
- Inaki Aguilar
- Mario García
- David Martín
- Ricardo Perrone
- Guillermo Molina
- Sergi Mora
- Óscar Rey
- José Rodríguez
- Xavier Vallès
- Felipe Perrone
- Iván Pérez (captain)
- Xavier García
- Ángel Andreo

Head coach:

- Rafael Aguilar
