= Tamás Kásás =

Hungarian water polo player

Personal information
- Nickname: Kása
- Nationality: Hungarian
- Born: 20 July 1976 (age 50) Budapest, Hungary
- Height: 2.00 m (6 ft 7 in)
- Weight: 90 kg (198 lb)

Sport
- Sport: Water polo
- Handedness: Right
- Position: Driver

Youth career
- Years: Team
- –: KSI

Senior clubs
- Years: Team
- –1994: KSI
- 1994–1995: FTC-Vitasport
- 1995–1997: UTE-Office & Home
- 1997–2003: Posillipo
- 2003–2004: Vasas-Plaket-Euroleasing
- 2004–2006: Savona
- 2006–2012: Pro Recco
National team
- Years: Team
- 1994–2012: Hungary
Medal record
Men's water polo
Representing Hungary
Olympic Games
Gold medal – first place	2000 Sydney	Team competition
Gold medal – first place	2004 Athens	Team competition
Gold medal – first place	2008 Beijing	Team competition
World Championships
Gold medal – first place	2003 Barcelona	Team competition
Silver medal – second place	1998 Perth	Team competition
Silver medal – second place	2005 Montréal	Team competition
Silver medal – second place	2007 Melbourne	Team competition
European Championship
Gold medal – first place	1997 Sevilla	Team competition
Gold medal – first place	1999 Firenze	Team competition
Silver medal – second place	1995 Vienna	Team competition
Silver medal – second place	2006 Belgrade	Team competition
Bronze medal – third place	2001 Budapest	Team competition
Bronze medal – third place	2003 Kranj	Team competition
Bronze medal – third place	2008 Málaga	Team competition
Bronze medal – third place	2012 Eindhoven	Team competition
FINA World League
Gold medal – first place	2003 New York	Team competition
Gold medal – first place	2004 Long Beach	Team competition
FINA World Cup
Gold medal – first place	1995 Atlanta	Team competition
Gold medal – first place	1999 Sydney	Team competition
Silver medal – second place	2002 Belgrade	Team competition
Silver medal – second place	2006 Budapest	Team competition
Bronze medal – third place	1997 Athens	Team competition

Tamás Kásás (Hungarian pronunciation: [ˈtɒmaːʃ ˈkaːʃaːʃ]; born 20 July 1976) is a retired Hungarian water polo player.

Kásás is often described as the best defensive player of his era, if not the best overall. He is known for his ability to spring out of the water and block shots, as well as his strength in one-on-one situations. He is also noted for his highly accurate shots and passes.

He picked up the sport at the age of six, being taught by his father Zoltán, who is a coach in Hungary. Zoltán Kásás was also a gifted player who won an Olympic silver medal in 1972, a World Championship in 1973, and a European title in 1974.

He made his Olympic debut in 1996, where Hungary reached the semifinals before losing to the Manuel Estiarte-led Spanish squad. However, the Hungarian team bounced back to win European Championships in 1997 and 1999, as well as a Champions League cup in 1998, culminating with three Olympic gold medals at Sydney in 2000, Athens in 2004 and Beijing in 2008.

Kásás played in five consecutive Summer Olympics for his native country from 1996 to 2012. He is, jointly with Croat Igor Hinić and Greek Georgios Afroudakis, the tenth athlete to compete in water polo at five Olympics. He is also a leading goalscorer in Olympic water polo history, with 56 goals.

In 2007 Kásás won Euro League with Pro Recco. He was named Most Valuable Player at the 2002 FINA Men's Water Polo World Cup, where Hungary claimed the silver medal.

== Honours ==
=== National ===
- Olympic Games: Gold medal – 2000, 2004, 2008
- World Championships: Gold medal – 2003; Silver medal – 1998, 2005, 2007
- European Championship: Gold medal – 1997, 1999; Silver medal – 1995, 2006; Bronze medal – 2001, 2003, 2008, 2012
- FINA World League: Gold medal – 2003, 2004; Bronze medal – 2002
- FINA World Cup: Gold medal – 1995, 1999; Silver medal – 2002, 2006; Bronze medal – 1997
- Junior World Championships: (Gold medal – 1995)
- Junior European Championship: (Gold medal – 1994)

=== Club ===
European competitions:

- Euroleague Winners (5): (1998 – with Posillipo; 2007, 2008, 2010, 2012 – with Pro Recco)
- LEN Cup Winners (2): (1997 – with UTE; 2005 – with Savona)
- LEN Super Cup Winners (4): (2007, 2008, 2010, 2012 – with Pro Recco)
- Adriatic League: 1x (2012 – with Pro Recco)

Domestic competitions:

- Italian Championship (Serie A1): 9x (2000, 2001 – with Posillipo; 2005 – with Savona; 2007, 2008, 2009, 2010, 2011, 2012 – with Pro Recco)
- Italian Cup (Coppa Italia): 5x (2007, 2008, 2009, 2010, 2011 – with Pro Recco)

== Awards ==
- Masterly youth athlete: 1996
- Member of the Hungarian team of year: 1997, 1999, 2000, 2003, 2004, 2008
- Hungarian Water Polo Player of the Year: 1999, 2006
- Member of Hungarian national water polo team in the 20th century (2000)
- World Cup MVP: 2002 Belgrade
- World Cup Top Scorer: 2002 Belgrade
- Honorary Citizen of Budapest (2008)
- LEN Champions League Final Four MVP: 2011
- FINA Aquatics World Magazine – The Best water polo player of the Decade (2010)
- Ministerial Certificate of Merit (2012)
- Immortal member of the Hungarian Association of Athletes (2015)
- Príma díj (2015)
- Member of International Swimming Hall of Fame (2015)

Orders

- Officer's Cross of the Order of Merit of the Republic of Hungary (2000)
- Commander's Cross of the Order of Merit of the Republic of Hungary (2004)
- Commander's Cross of the Order of Merit of the Republic of Hungary with the Star (2008)

== See also ==
- Hungary men's Olympic water polo team records and statistics
- List of athletes with the most appearances at Olympic Games
- List of players who have appeared in multiple men's Olympic water polo tournaments
- List of multiple Olympic gold medalists in one event
- List of Olympic champions in men's water polo
- List of Olympic medalists in water polo (men)
- List of men's Olympic water polo tournament top goalscorers
- List of world champions in men's water polo
- List of World Aquatics Championships medalists in water polo
- List of members of the International Swimming Hall of Fame

Awards
Preceded by (Russia) Aleksandr Yeryshov	Most Valuable Player of Water Polo European Championship; 2006	Succeeded by (Hungary) Péter Biros
