= Norbert Madaras =

Hungarian water polo player

Personal information
- Nationality: Hungarian
- Born: 1 December 1979 (age 46) Eger, Hungary
- Height: 1.92 m (6 ft 3 1/2 in)

Sport
- Sport: Water polo
- Handedness: Left
- Position: Wing, Driver
- Current club: Hungary (president)

Youth career
- Years: Team
- –: Eger

Senior clubs
- Years: Team
- –2001: BVSC
- 2001–2004: Vasas
- 2004–2014: Pro Recco
- 2014–2016: Szolnok
- 2016–2018: Ferencváros
National team
Years	Team	Apps
2002–2016	Hungary	340

Teams coached
- 2018–2022: Ferencváros (sec.president)
- 2022–present: Hungary (president)
Medal record
Men's water polo
Representing Hungary
Olympic Games
Gold medal – first place	2004 Athens	Team
Gold medal – first place	2008 Beijing	Team
World Championships
Gold medal – first place	2003 Barcelona	Team
Gold medal – first place	2013 Barcelona	Team
Silver medal – second place	2005 Montréal	Team
Silver medal – second place	2007 Melbourne	Team
European Championship competition
Silver medal – second place	2006 Belgrade	Team
Silver medal – second place	2014 Budapest	Team
Bronze medal – third place	2003 Kranj	Team
Bronze medal – third place	2008 Málaga	Team
Bronze medal – third place	2012 Eindhoven	Team
FINA World League
Gold medal – first place	2003 New York	Team
Gold medal – first place	2004 Long Beach	Team
Silver medal – second place	2005 Belgrade	Team
Silver medal – second place	2007 Berlin	Team
Silver medal – second place	2014 Dubai	Team
Bronze medal – third place	2002 Patras	Team
FINA World Cup
Silver medal – second place	2006 Budapest	Team
Silver medal – second place	2014 Almaty	Team
- Updated on 2 August 2023

Norbert Madaras (born 1 December 1979 in Eger) is a Hungarian water polo player, who won the gold medal with the men's national team at the 2004 Summer Olympics and 2008 Summer Olympics. He also was on the squad that claimed the title at the 2003 World Aquatics Championships and the 2013 World Aquatics Championships. Madaras won the Euro League 2007 with Pro Recco.

== Honours ==
=== National ===
- Olympic Games: Gold medal – 2004, 2008
- World Championships: Gold medal – 2003, 2013; Silver medal – 2005, 2007
- European Championship: Silver medal – 2006, 2014; Bronze medal – 2003, 2008, 2012
- FINA World League: Gold medal – 2003, 2004; Silver medal – 2005, 2007, 2013, 2014; Bronze medal – 2002
- FINA World Cup: Silver medal – 2006, 2014
- Universiade: (Bronze medal – 2001)

=== Club ===
BVSC (BVSC-Brendon)

- Hungarian Cup (1x): 1999–2000

Vasas (Vasas-Plaket, Vasas-Plaket-Euroleasing)

- Hungarian Cup (1x): 2001–02
- LEN Cup Winners' Cup (1x): 2001–02

Pro Recco (Ferla Pro Recco)

- Italian Championship (9x): 2005–06, 2006–07, 2007–08, 2008–09, 2009–10, 2010–11, 2011–12, 2012–13, 2013–14
- Italian Cup (7x): 2005–06, 2006–07, 2007–08, 2008–09, 2009–10, 2010–11, 2012–13, 2013–14
- LEN Champions League (4x): 2006–07, 2007–08, 2009–10, 2011–12
- LEN Super Cup (4x): 2007, 2008, 2010, 2012
- Adriatic League (1x): 2011–12

Szolnok (Szolnoki Dózsa-KÖZGÉP)

- Hungarian Championship (2x): 2014–15, 2015–16
- Hungarian Cup (1x): 2014

Ferencváros (FTC PQS Waterpolo)

- Hungarian Championship (1x): 2017–18
- LEN Euro Cup (2x): 2016–17, 2017–18
- LEN Champions League (1x): 2018–19

== Awards ==
- Member of the Hungarian team of year: 2003, 2004, 2008, 2013
- Hungarian Water Polo Player of the Year: 2010, 2012
- Ministerial Certificate of Merit (2012)

Orders

- Officer's Cross of the Order of Merit of the Republic of Hungary (2004)
- Commander's Cross of the Order of Merit of the Republic of Hungary (2008)

== See also ==
- Hungary men's Olympic water polo team records and statistics
- List of Olympic champions in men's water polo
- List of Olympic medalists in water polo (men)
- List of men's Olympic water polo tournament top goalscorers
- List of world champions in men's water polo
- List of World Aquatics Championships medalists in water polo
