= Vujasinović =

Vujasinović (Serbian Cyrillic: Вујасиновић) is a Serbian surname, a patronymic derived from the male given name Vujasin. Notable people with the surname include:

- Dada Vujasinović (1964–1994), Serbian journalist
- Daniel Vujasinović (born 1989), Slovenian basketball player
- Miroslav Vujasinović, handball coach
- Vladimir Vujasinović (born 1973), Serbian water polo player
- Vladimir Vujasinović (footballer) (born 1989), Serbian football goalkeeper

== See also ==
- Vujadinović
