= Dániel Varga =

Hungarian water polo player

Personal information
- Full name: Dániel Rudolf Varga
- Nickname: Dani
- Nationality: Hungarian
- Born: 25 September 1983 (age 43) Budapest, Hungary
- Height: 2.01 m (6 ft 7 in)

Sport
- Sport: Water polo
- Handedness: Right
- Position: Driver
- Current club: OSC-Újbuda (head coach)

Youth career
- Years: Team
- –: Újpest

Senior clubs
- Years: Team
- –2001: Újpest
- 2001–2010: Vasas
- 2010–2014: Primorje Rijeka
- 2014–2016: Szolnok
- 2016–2018: Ferencváros
National team
Years	Team	Apps
2004–2016	Hungary	278

Teams coached
- 2018–2020: Ferencváros U19
- 2020–present: OSC-Újbuda
Medal record
Men's water polo
Representing Hungary
Olympic Games
Gold medal – first place	2008 Beijing	Team
World Championships
Gold medal – first place	2013 Barcelona	Team
Silver medal – second place	2005 Montreal	Team
Silver medal – second place	2007 Melbourne	Team
European Championship
Silver medal – second place	2006 Belgrade	Team
Silver medal – second place	2014 Budapest	Team
Bronze medal – third place	2008 Malaga	Team
Bronze medal – third place	2012 Eindhoven	Team
Bronze medal – third place	2016 Belgrade	Team
FINA World League
Silver medal – second place	2005 Belgrade	Team
Silver medal – second place	2007 Berlin	Team
Silver medal – second place	2013 Chelyabinsk	Team
Silver medal – second place	2014 Dubai	Team
FINA World Cup
Silver medal – second place	2014 Almaty	Team
- Updated on 2 August 2023

Dániel Rudolf Varga (born 25 September 1983) is a Hungarian water polo coach. He was a member of the gold medal-winning Hungary men's national water polo team at the 2008 Beijing Olympics.

He is the older brother of Dénes Varga, they were teammates on the Hungarian national team from 2004 to 2016.

== Honours ==
=== National ===
- Olympic Games: gold medal – 2008
- World Championships: gold medal – 2013; silver medal – 2005, 2007
- European Championship: silver medal – 2006, 2014; bronze medal – 2008, 2012, 2016
- FINA World League: silver medal – 2005, 2007, 2013, 2014
- FINA World Cup: silver medal – 2014

278 present in the national team of Hungary.

- Junior World Championships: (silver medal – 2003)
- Junior European Championship: (silver medal – 2002)
- Youth European Championship: (gold medal – 2001; bronze medal – 1999)

=== Club ===
- Cup Winners' Cup Winners (1): (2002 – with Vasas)
- LEN Euro Cup Winners (2): (2017, 2018 – with FTC)
- Adriatic League: 2x (2013, 2014 – with Primorje)
- Hungarian Championship (OB I): 7x (2007, 2008, 2009, 2010 – with Vasas; 2015, 2016 – with Szolnok; 2018 – with Ferencváros)
- Hungarian Cup (Magyar Kupa): 5x (2002, 2004, 2005, 2009 – with Vasas; 2014 – with Szolnok)
- Croatian Championship (Prva HVL): 1x (2014 – with Primorje)
- Croatian Cup (Kup Hrvatske): 2x (2012, 2013 – with Primorje)

== Awards ==
- Szalay Iván-díj (2000)
- Faragó Tamás-díj (Best junior player of year): (2001)
- MVP of the Youth European Championship: 2001
- MVP of the Junior European Championship: 2002
- Vasas
- All-Star Team of the World Championship: 2007
- Hungarian Water Polo Player of the Year: 2007, 2013
- All-Star Team of the Olympic Games: 2008
- Junior Príma díj (2008)
- Member of the Hungarian team of year: 2008, 2013
- Ministerial Certificate of Merit (2012)

Orders

- Officer's Cross of the Order of Merit of the Republic of Hungary (2008)

== See also ==
- Hungary men's Olympic water polo team records and statistics
- List of Olympic champions in men's water polo
- List of Olympic medalists in water polo (men)
- List of world champions in men's water polo
- List of World Aquatics Championships medalists in water polo
