= Vujadinović =

Vujadinović (Serbian Cyrillic: Вујадиновић) is a Serbian surname, derived from the male given name Vujadin, may refer to:

- Borislav Vujadinović (born 1959), Serbian bobsledder
- Đorđe Vujadinović (1909–1990), Serbian footballer and manager
- Dragan Vujadinović (1953–2021), Serbian politician
- Jelena Vujadinović (born 2000), Montenegrin footballer
- Milimir Vujadinović (born 1979), Serbian politician
- Miroslav Vujadinović (born 1983), Montenegrin footballer
- Nevena Vujadinović (born 1990), Serbian politician
- Nikola Vujadinović (born 1986), Montenegrin footballer
- Rajko Vujadinović (born 1956), Montenegrin footballer

== See also ==
- Vukadinović
- Vujasinović
