= 2002 FINA Men's Water Polo World Cup =

- League: FINA Water Polo World Cup
- Sport: Water polo
- Duration: 20 – 25 August

Super Final
- Finals champions: Russia
- Runners-up: Hungary

FINA Water Polo World Cup seasons
- ← 1999 2006 →

The 2002 FINA Men's Water Polo World Cup was the twelfth edition of the event, organised by the world's governing body in aquatics, the International Swimming Federation (FINA). The event took place in the Tašmajdan Swimming Pool in Belgrade, Yugoslavia from August 20 to August 25, 2002. Participating teams were the eight best teams from the last World Championships in Fukuoka, Japan (2001).

The FINA Cup in Belgrade decided which teams qualified directly to the 2003 World Aquatics Championships in Barcelona, Spain from July 13 to July 27, 2003. Russia and Hungary, as well as the host Spain, already qualified based on the results from the 2002 FINA Men's Water Polo World League (June 28 – August 4, 2002).

== Teams ==
The top eight teams from the previous World Aquatic Championship have qualified.

Teams	Qualified as
Yugoslavia; Spain; Russia; Italy; Hungary; Greece; United States; Croatia	Host (2nd 2001 World Championship); 1st 2001 World Championship; 3rd 2001 World Championship; 4th 2001 World Championship; 5th 2001 World Championship; 6th 2001 World Championship; 7th 2001 World Championship; 8th 2001 World Championship

== Seeding ==
Following ranking of the 2001 World Championship

Pot 1	Pot 2	Pot 3	Pot 4
Spain (1); FR Yugoslavia (2) (H)	Russia (3); Italy (4)	Hungary (5); Greece (6)	United States (7); Croatia (8)

== Groups ==
Group A	Group B
Yugoslavia (H); Russia; Hungary; United States	Spain; Italy; Greece; Croatia

== Preliminary round ==
=== Group A ===
	Team	Points	G	W	D	L	GF	GA	Diff	Qualification
1.	Yugoslavia (H)	4	3	2	0	1	26	19	+7	Semi-finals
2.	Russia	4	3	2	0	1	21	21	0	Quarter-finals
3.	Hungary	4	3	2	0	1	24	19	+5	Quarter-finals
4.	United States	0	3	0	0	3	14	26	–12	

- August 20, 2002

Russia	7 – 6	Hungary	2-2 1-1 0-2 4-1
United States	4 – 9	Yugoslavia	0-2 0-2 2-3 2-2

- August 21, 2002

United States	5 – 9	Hungary	1-1 1-2 2-2 1-4
Russia	6 – 10	Yugoslavia	1-4 3-3 2-3 0-0

- August 22, 2002

United States	5 – 8	Russia	0-2 0-3 2-1 3-2
Yugoslavia	7 – 9	Hungary	2-3 1-2 2-2 2-2

=== Group B ===
	Team	Points	G	W	D	L	GF	GA	Diff	Qualification
1.	Italy	5	3	2	1	0	19	16	+3	Semi-finals
2.	Greece	3	3	0	3	0	18	18	0	Quarter-finals
3.	Spain	3	3	1	1	1	17	16	+1	Quarter-finals
4.	Croatia	1	3	0	1	2	16	20	–4	

- August 20, 2002

Croatia	5 – 6	Italy	2-1 1-2 2-1 0-2
Greece	5 – 5	Spain	1-2 3-1 1-1 0-1

- August 21, 2002

Croatia	4 – 7	Spain	1-3 1-2 2-1 0-1
Greece	6 – 6	Italy	1-1 1-1 1-1 3-3

- August 22, 2002

Italy	7 – 5	Spain	1-1 2-1 2-1 2-2
Croatia	7 – 7	Greece	2-1 2-1 1-3 2-2

== Quarterfinals ==
- August 23, 2002

Hungary	10 – 7	Greece	4-1 2-3 1-2 3-1
Russia	6 – 5	Spain	0-0 1-2 3-2 2-1

== Semifinals ==
- August 24, 2002

Yugoslavia	5 – 7	Hungary	2-2 1-3 1-1 1-1
Italy	4 – 5	Russia	1-1 1-0 2-1 0-3

== Finals ==
- August 23, 2002 — Seventh place

United States	12 – 10	Croatia	4-4 4-3 2-1 2-2

- August 24, 2002 — Fifth place

Greece	4 – 3	Spain	2-1 1-2 1-0 0-0

- August 25, 2002 — Third place

Yugoslavia	6 – 4	Italy	2-0 1-1 1-2 2-1

- August 25, 2002 — First place

Hungary	9 – 10	Russia	3-2 3-2 2-4 1-2

== Final ranking ==
RANK	TEAM
	Russia
	Hungary
	Yugoslavia
4.	Italy
5.	Greece
6.	Spain
7.	United States
8.	Croatia

2002 Men's FINA World Cup winners

Russia
Third title

- Yugoslavia, Italy, Greece and the United States qualified for the 2003 World Aquatics Championships. Russia and Hungary, as well as the host Spain, already qualified.

== Individual awards ==
- Most Valuable Player
  - Tamás Kásás (HUN)
- Best Goalkeeper
  - Nikolai Maximov (RUS)
- Topscorer
  - Tamás Kásás (HUN) — 13 goals

== Squads ==
=== Croatia ===
- Teo Đogaš
- Nikola Franković
- Hrvoje Herceg
- Igor Hinić
- Hrvoje Koljanin
- Aljoša Kunač
- Ivan Milaković
- Dalibor Perčinić
- Danijel Premuš
- Tomislav Primorac
- Ratko Štritof
- Goran Volarević
- Tihomil Vranješ

Head coach:

- Veselin Đuho

=== Greece ===
- Christos Afroudakis
- Theodoros Chatzitheodorou
- Nikolaos Deligiannis
- Theodoros Kalakonas
- Konstantinos Loudis
- Dimitrios Mazis
- Georgios Reppas
- Stefanos Santa
- Anastasios Schizas
- Argyris Theodoropoulos
- Ioannis Thomakos
- Dimitrios Tsiklos
- Antonios Vlontakis

Head coach:

- Takis Michalos

=== Italy ===
- Alberto Angelini
- Fabio Bencivenga
- Leonardo Binchi
- Fabrizio Buonocore
- Alessandro Calcaterra
- Roberto Calcaterra
- Maurizio Felugo
- Francesco Ferrari
- Goran Fiorentini
- Federico Mistrangelo
- Francesco Postiglione
- Bogdan Rath
- Stefano Tempesti

Head coach:

- Alessandro Campagna

=== Hungary ===
- Attila Bárány
- Tibor Benedek
- Péter Biros
- Rajmund Fodor
- Tamás Kásás
- Gergely Katonás
- Gergely Kiss
- Zoltán Kovács
- Csaba Kiss
- Tamás Molnár
- Barnabás Steinmetz
- Zoltán Szécsi
- Attila Vári

Head coach:

- Dénes Kemény

=== Russia ===
- Revaz Chomakhidze
- Denis Denisov
- Aleksandr Fyodorov
- Serguei Garbouzov
- Dmitry Gorshkov
- Nikolay Kozlov
- Nikolay Maximov
- Andrei Reketchinski
- Dmitri Stratan
- Yuri Yatsev
- Alexander Yerishev
- Marat Zakirov
- Irek Zinnourov

Head coach:

- Aleksandr Kabanov

=== United States ===
- Tony Azevedo
- Ryan Bailey
- Layne Beaubien
- Larry Felix
- Peter Hudnut
- Dan Klatt
- Genai Kerr
- Merrill Moses
- Jeff Powers
- Chris Segesman
- Jesse Smith
- Wolf Wigo
- Adam Wright

Head coach:

- Ratko Rudić

=== Yugoslavia ===
- Aleksandar Ćirić
- Danilo Ikodinović
- Nikola Janović
- Viktor Jelenić
- Nikola Kuljača
- Aleksandar Šapić
- Dejan Savić
- Denis Šefik
- Petar Trbojević
- Vanja Udovičić
- Vladimir Vujasinović
- Nenad Vukanić
- Boris Zloković

Head coach:

- Nenad Manojlović
