= Vukadinović =

Vukadinović (Serbian Cyrillic: Вукадиновић) is a Serbian surname, derived from the male given name Vukadin. Notable people with the surname include:

- Dejan Vukadinović (born 1982), Montenegrin footballer
- Đorđe Vukadinović (born 1962), Serbian philosopher, journalist and politician
- Holly Valance (born Vukadinović, 1983), Australian actress, singer and model
- Ivan Vukadinović (born 1984), Serbian footballer
- Milica Vukadinović (born 1968), Serbian former basketball player
- Miljan Vukadinović (born 1992), Serbian footballer
- Vlastimir Vukadinović (born 1982), Serbian basketball coach
- Vukadin Vukadinović (born 1990), Serbian footballer
- Vuko Vukadinović (1937–1993), Montenegrin politician

== See also ==
- Vujadinović
