= Serbia and Montenegro men's national water polo team =

FR Yugoslavia 1992–2003 Serbia and Montenegro 2003–2006
- FINA code: YUG (1992–2003); SCG (2003–2006)
- Association: Water Polo Association of FR Yugoslavia (1992–2003); Water Polo Association of Serbia and Montenegro (2003–2006)
- Confederation: LEN (Europe)

Last international
- Serbia and Montenegro 6–4 Spain (Athens, Greece; 6 August 2006)

Olympic Games
- Appearances: 3 (first in 1996)
- Best result: (silver) (2004)

World Championship
- Appearances: 4 (first in 1998)
- Best result: (gold) (2005)

World Cup
- Appearances: 4 (first in 1997)
- Best result: (gold) (2006)

World League
- Appearances: 4 (first in 2003)
- Best result: (gold) (2005, 2006)

European Championship
- Appearances: 4 (first in 1997)
- Best result: (gold) (2001, 2003)

Europa Cup
- Appearances: 2 (first in 2018)
- Best result: 4th (2018)

Mediterranean Games
- Appearances: 3 (first in 1997)
- Best result: (gold) (1997)
Medal record
Men's water polo
Representing FR Yugoslavia / Serbia and Montenegro
Olympic Games
Silver medal – second place	2004 Athens	Team
Bronze medal – third place	2000 Sydney	Team
World Championship
Gold medal – first place	2005 Montreal	Team
Silver medal – second place	2001 Fukuoka	Team
Bronze medal – third place	1998 Perth	Team
Bronze medal – third place	2003 Barcelona	Team
FINA World Cup
Gold medal – first place	2006 Budapest
Bronze medal – third place	2002 Belgrade
FINA World League
Gold medal – first place	2005 Belgrade
Gold medal – first place	2006 Athens
Silver medal – second place	2004 Long Beach
European Championship
Gold medal – first place	2001 Budapest
Gold medal – first place	2003 Kranj
Silver medal – second place	1997 Seville
Mediterranean Games
Gold medal – first place	1997 Bari	Team
Bronze medal – third place	2005 Almeria	Team
Summer Universiade
Gold medal – first place	2005 Izmir	Team
Silver medal – second place	2003 Daegu	Team

The Serbia and Montenegro men's national water polo team, also widely known as the FR Yugoslavia men's national water polo team, represented Serbia and Montenegro in international water polo games, from 1993 to 2006. It was governed by the Water Polo Association of FR Yugoslavia (1992–2003), then the Water Polo Association of Serbia and Montenegro (2003–2006). The team won medals in the Olympics, World and European Championships, FINA World Cup, FINA World League, Mediterranean Games and Universiade.

== History ==
After the breakup of Yugoslavia, in 1991–1992, the original Yugoslavia men's national water polo team was dissolved. Bosnia and Herzegovina (Bosnia and Herzegovina NT), Croatia (Croatia NT), Macedonia (Macedonia NT) (later known as North Macedonia), and Slovenia (Slovenia NT) then formed their own national teams. While the then remaining and smaller Yugoslavia (originally known as FR Yugoslavia, and later as Serbia and Montenegro) formed its own national team.

That national team was originally named either "Yugoslavia men's national water polo team", or "FR Yugoslavia men's national water polo team", from 1992 until 2003, after the country's name at the time. In 2003, after the country was renamed from FR Yugoslavia to Serbia and Montenegro, the team was also renamed to "Serbia and Montenegro men's national water polo team". After Serbia and Montenegro split up, in 2006, and became the independent countries of Serbia and Montenegro, they each formed their own successor national teams. The first appearance of the Serbia men's national water polo team at a major international competition was at the 2006 European Championship. While the first appearance of the Montenegro men's national water polo team at a major international competition was at the 2007 FINA World League.

=== Names ===
- Federal Republic of Yugoslavia (FR Yugoslavia) men's national water polo team: 1992–2003
- Serbia and Montenegro men's national water polo team: 2003–2006

=== Predecessor and successor teams ===
- Predecessor team
  - Yugoslavia
- Successor teams
  - Serbia
  - Montenegro

== Competitive record ==
=== Medals ===
Competition	1st place, gold medalist(s)	2nd place, silver medalist(s)	3rd place, bronze medalist(s)	Total
Olympic Games	0	1	1	2
World Championship	1	1	2	4
World Cup	1	0	1	2
World League	2	1	0	3
European Championship	2	1	0	3
Mediterranean Games	1	0	1	2
Summer Universiade	1	1	0	2
Total	8	5	5	18

=== Olympic Games ===
Year	Position
1936 to 1988	Part of SFR Yugoslavia
as FR Yugoslavia
(Spain) 1992 Barcelona	Suspended
(United States) 1996 Atlanta	8th
(Australia) 2000 Sydney	Bronze medal
as Serbia and Montenegro
(Greece) 2004 Athens	Silver medal

=== World Championship ===
Year	Position
1973 to 1991	Part of SFR Yugoslavia
as FR Yugoslavia
(Italy) 1994 Rome	Suspended
(Australia) 1998 Perth	Bronze medal
(Japan) 2001 Fukuoka	Silver medal
as Serbia and Montenegro
(Spain) 2003 Barcelona	Bronze medal
(Canada) 2005 Montreal	Gold medal

=== World Cup ===
Year	Position
1979 to 1991	Part of SFR Yugoslavia
as FR Yugoslavia
(Greece) 1993 Athens	Suspended
(United States) 1995 Atlanta	Did not participate
(Greece) 1997 Athens	7th
(Australia) 1999 Sydney	5th
(Federal Republic of Yugoslavia) 2002 Belgrade	Bronze medal
as Serbia and Montenegro
(Hungary) 2006 Budapest	Gold medal

=== World League ===
Year	Position
as FR Yugoslavia
(Greece) 2002 Patras	Did not participate
as Serbia and Montenegro
(United States) 2003 New York	4th
(United States) 2004 Long Beach	Silver medal
(Serbia and Montenegro) 2005 Belgrade	Gold medal
(Greece) 2006 Athens	Gold medal

=== European Championship ===
Year	Position
1950 to 1991	Part of SFR Yugoslavia
as FR Yugoslavia
(United Kingdom) 1993 Sheffield	Suspended
(Austria) 1995 Vienna	Did not participate
(Spain) 1997 Seville	Silver medal
(Italy) 1999 Florence	7th
(Hungary) 2001 Budapest	Gold medal
as Serbia and Montenegro
(Slovenia) 2003 Kranj	Gold medal

=== Mediterranean Games ===
Year	Position
1959 to 1991	Part of SFR Yugoslavia
as FR Yugoslavia
(France) 1993 Languedoc-Roussillon	Suspended
(Italy) 1997 Bari	Gold medal
(Tunisia) 2001 Tunis	4th
as Serbia and Montenegro
(Spain) 2005 Almeria	Bronze medal

== Team ==
=== Coaches ===
- 1992–1999 Nikola Stamenić
- 1999–2004 Nenad Manojlović
- 2004–2006 Petar Porobić

== See also ==
- Serbia and Montenegro men's Olympic water polo team records and statistics
- Yugoslavia men's national water polo team
- Serbia men's national water polo team
- Montenegro men's national water polo team
- List of world champions in men's water polo
