= Vujanić =

Vujanić is a Serbian surname, derived from the male given name Vujan. Notable people with the surname include:

- Miloš Vujanić (born 1980), Serbian basketball player
- Saša Vujanić (born 1979), Serbian canoeist

== See also ==
- Vujanović
