= Vujadin =

Vujadin (Cyrillic script: Вујадин) is a traditional Serbian given name, and may refer to:

- Vujadin Boškov
- Vujadin Stanojković
- Vujadin Vujadinović
- Vujadin Savić

== See also ==
- Vujadinović
