= Igor Vujanović =

Bosnian Serb footballer

Personal information
- Full name: Igor Vujanović
- Date of birth: 13 August 1978 (age 48)
- Place of birth: SFR Yugoslavia
- Height: 1.84 m (6 ft 1/2 in)
- Position: Midfielder

Senior career*
Years	Team	Apps	(Gls)
1994–1995	Red Star Belgrade	0	(0)
1995–1998	Borac Čačak	10	(0)
1998–1999	Borac Banja Luka	11	(0)
1999	Obilić	2	(0)
2000	Železničar Beograd		
2000–2001	Železnik	9	(0)
2001–2002	Remont Čačak	26	(1)
2002–2006	Skjold	80	(9)
2006–xxxx	Fremad Amager	4	(0)
2008	→ Lolland-Falster Alliancen (loan)		
- * Club domestic league appearances and goals

Igor Vujanović (Serbian Cyrillic: Игор Вујановић; born 13 August 1978) is a Bosnian Serb retired footballer who last played in Denmark for Fremad Amager.

== Club career ==
Before moving to Denmark in 2002, he had trials with clubs including F.C. Copenhagen, and while at Fremad Amager he spent time on loan with Lolland-Falster Alliancen.
