= Nevena Vujadinović =

Serbian politician

Nevena Vujadinović (Serbian Cyrillic: Невена Вујадиновић; born 1990) is a politician in Serbia. She has served in the National Assembly of Serbia since October 2020 as a member of the Serbian Progressive Party.

== Private career ==
Vujadinović has a master's degree in special education. She lives in Sombor.

== Politician ==
Vujadinović received the 189th position on the Progressive Party's Aleksandar Vučić — For Our Children electoral list for the 2020 Serbian parliamentary election and narrowly missed direct election when the list won a landslide majority with 188 out of 250 mandates. She was awarded a mandate on 28 October 2020 as the replacement for another party member who had resigned. She is the leader of Serbia's parliamentary friendship group with South Sudan and a member of the parliamentary friendship groups with Canada, Egypt, Greece, Norway, Russia, Spain, and the United Arab Emirates.
