= 2006 Men's European Water Polo Championship =

The 2006 Men's European Water Polo Championship' was the 27th exhibition of the event organised by the Europe's governing body in aquatics, the Ligue Européenne de Natation. The event took place in the Tašmajdan Sports Centre in Belgrade, Serbia, from 1 to 10 September 2006.

There were three qualification tournaments ahead of the event, held from 7 to 9 April 2006 in Kranj, Slovenia (with France, Slovenia, Slovakia and Malta competing), in Eindhoven, Netherlands (Greece, Netherlands, Poland and Moldova), and in Imperia, Italy (Belarus, Italy, Romania and Turkey).

== Teams ==
GROUP A

- Serbia
- Russia
- Spain
- Slovakia
- Netherlands
- Romania

GROUP B

- Hungary
- Slovenia
- Greece
- Croatia
- Germany
- Italy

== Preliminary round ==
=== Group A ===
	Team	Points	G	W	D	L	GF	GA	Diff
1.	Serbia	15	5	5	0	0	78	34	+44
2.	Spain	9	5	3	0	2	59	54	+5
3.	Romania	7	5	2	1	2	41	48	−7
4.	Russia	6	5	2	0	3	49	53	−4
5.	Netherlands	5	5	1	2	2	46	58	−12
6.	Slovakia	1	5	0	1	4	36	62	−26

September 1, 2006

10:00	Romania	8 – 11	Spain	(2–4, 2–4, 2–1, 2–2)
13:00	Netherlands	11–11	Slovakia	(4–3, 2–3, 3–3, 2–2)
20:15	Serbia	13 – 6	Russia	(5–1, 3–1, 3–2, 2–2)

September 2, 2006

11:30	Spain	13 – 8	Slovakia	(3–3, 3–2, 4–0, 3–3)
13:00	Romania	13 – 10	Russia	(2–3, 4–1, 4–3, 3–3)
20:15	Serbia	17 – 10	Netherlands	(6–4, 3–1, 4–3, 4–2)

September 3, 2006

11:30	Netherlands	8–8	Romania	(4–2, 2–4, 1–1, 1–1)
13:00	Russia	10 – 13	Spain	(1–5, 5–1, 3–5, 1–2)
20:15	Serbia	19 – 2	Slovakia	(4–1, 5–0, 6–1, 4–0)

September 4, 2006

10:00	Russia	11 – 5	Netherlands	(3–0, 2–2, 4–0, 2–3)
11:30	Romania	7 – 6	Slovakia	(1–2, 4–2, 1–1, 1–1)
20:15	Serbia	16 – 11	Spain	(3–1, 5–3, 3–3, 5–4)

September 5, 2006

11:30	Slovakia	9 – 12	Russia	(2–2, 2–4, 1–3, 4–3)
13:00	Netherlands	12 – 11	Spain	(4–2, 3–4, 4–2, 1–3)
20:15	Serbia	13 – 5	Romania	(4–2, 2–1, 4–1, 3–1)

=== Group B ===
	Team	Points	G	W	D	L	GF	GA	Diff
1.	Hungary	15	5	5	0	0	82	41	+41
2.	Italy	9	5	3	0	2	57	50	+7
3.	Greece	7	5	2	1	2	59	48	+11
4.	Germany	7	5	2	1	2	52	54	−2
5.	Croatia	5	5	1	2	2	57	52	+5
6.	Slovenia	0	5	0	0	5	33	95	−62

September 1, 2006

11:30	Hungary	23 – 6	Slovenia	(5–1, 8–0, 4–2, 6–3)
17:15	Greece	11 – 8	Germany	(1–1, 4–1, 3–4, 3–2)
18:45	Croatia	8 – 9	Italy	(2–2, 0–2, 4–3, 2–2)

September 2, 2006

10:00	Slovenia	6 – 19	Greece	(2–5, 1–4, 2–3, 1–7)
17:15	Italy	8 – 11	Germany	(1–4, 2–2, 1–2, 4–3)
18:45	Croatia	11 – 16	Hungary	(3–4, 4–3, 1–5, 3–4)

September 3, 2006

10:00	Germany	14 – 6	Slovenia	(2–2, 5–0, 2–3, 5–1)
17:15	Greece	10–10	Croatia	(2–2, 1–1, 4–4, 3–3)
18:45	Hungary	13 – 6	Italy	(3–2, 6–2, 2–1, 2–1)

September 4, 2006

13:00	Italy	20 – 7	Slovenia	(7–1, 3–1, 4–2, 6–3)
17:15	Hungary	10 – 8	Greece	(3–2, 3–2, 1–2, 3–2)
18:45	Croatia	9–9	Germany	(3–2, 3–1, 2–2, 1–4)

September 5, 2006

10:00	Slovenia	8 – 19	Croatia	(2–7, 3–5, 2–4, 1–3)
17:15	Germany	10 – 20	Hungary	(1–7, 4–4, 5–3, 0–6)
18:45	Greece	11 – 14	Italy	(2–2, 3–3, 2–4, 4–5)

== Final round ==
=== Places 7/12 ===
September 7, 2006

10:00	Netherlands	12 – 8	Slovenia	(3–1, 0–2, 1–5, 4–4)
11:30	Slovakia	6 – 12	Croatia	(3–4, 0–1, 3–5, 0–2)

September 8, 2006

11:30	Croatia	10 – 7	Russia	(2–1, 4–1, 1–2, 3–3)
13:00	Netherlands	6 – 12	Germany	(3–3, 1–3, 1–2, 1–4)

==== Places 11 / 12 ====
September 8, 2006

10:00	Slovenia	9 – 10	Slovakia	(2–4, 1–3, 5–2, 1–1)

==== Places 9 / 10 ====
September 9, 2006

10:00	Russia	15 – 10	Netherlands	(5–3, 3–3, 5–0, 2–4)

==== Places 7 / 8 ====
September 9, 2006

11:30	Croatia	11 – 7	Germany	(2–1, 4–3, 2–1, 3–2)

=== Quarterfinals ===
September 7, 2006

18:45	Spain	12 – 10	Greece	(3–2, 3–3, 2–3, 4–2)
20:15	Romania	10 – 9	Italy	(4–4, 2–5, 1–0, 3–0)

=== Semifinals ===
September 8, 2006

18:45	Romania	6 – 13	Serbia	(0–4, 1–2, 2–3, 3–4)
20:15	Spain	10 – 16	Hungary	(3–5, 2–3, 1–4, 4–4)

=== Finals ===
==== Places 5 / 6 ====
September 9, 2006

13:00	Greece	10 – 11	Italy	(1–2, 1–0, 3–3, 3–3, 1–2, 1–1)

==== Bronze medal ====
September 10, 2006

18:45	Romania	4 – 10	Spain	(1–2, 2–2, 0–3, 1–3)

==== Gold medal ====
September 10, 2006

21:00	Serbia	9 – 8	Hungary	(2–4, 4–1, 2–3, 1–0)

== Final ranking ==
RANK	TEAM
	Serbia
	Hungary
	Spain
4.	Romania
5.	Italy
6.	Greece
7.	Croatia
8.	Germany
9.	Russia
10.	Netherlands
11.	Slovakia
12.	Slovenia

2006 Men's European champion

Serbia
Fourth title

Team roster

Denis Šefik, Petar Trbojević, Živko Gocić, Vanja Udovičić, Dejan Savić, Danilo Ikodinović, Slobodan Nikić, Filip Filipović, Aleksandar Ćirić, Aleksandar Šapić, Vladimir Vujasinović, Branko Peković, Slobodan Soro, Duško Pijetlović, and Andrija Prlainović
Head coach: Dejan Udovičić

== Individual awards ==
- Most Valuable Player
  - Tamás Kásás (HUN)
- Best Goalkeeper
  - Denis Šefik (SRB)
- Topscorer
  - Aleksandar Šapić (SRB)— 33 goals

== Medalists ==
Gold	Silver	Bronze
SERBIA: 1. Denis Šefik GK; 2. Petar Trbojević; 3. Živko Gocić; 4. Vanja Udovičić; 5. Dejan Savić; 6. Danilo Ikodinović; 7. Slobodan Nikić; 8. Filip Filipović; 9. Aleksandar Ćirić; 10. Aleksandar Šapić; 11. Vladimir Vujasinović; 12. Branko Peković; 13. Slobodan Soro GK; 14. Duško Pijetlović; 15. Andrija Prlainović; Head coach Dejan Udovičić	HUNGARY: 1. Zoltán Szécsi; 2. Dániel Varga; 3. Norbert Madaras; 4. Ádám Steinmetz; 5. Tamás Kásás; 6. Márton Szívós; 7. Gergely Kiss; 8. Norbert Hosnyánszky; 9. Rajmund Fodor; 10. Dénes Varga; 11. Gábor Kis; 12. Tamás Molnár; 13. Péter Biros; 14. Miklós Gór-Nagy; 15. Gábor Jászberényi; Head coach Dénes Kemény	SPAIN: 1. Inaki Aguilar; 2. Mario García; 3. David Martín; 4. Ricardo Perrone; 5. Guillermo Molina; 6. Sergio Mora; 7. Oscar Rey; 8. José Rodríguez; 9. Xavier Vallès; 10. Felipe Perrone; 11. Iván Pérez; 12. Xavier García; 13. Ángel Andreo; 14. Marc Minguell; 15. Blai Mallarach; Head coach Rafael Aguilar

== Top scorers ==
Pl.	Player	Goals
1.	Aleksandar Šapić (SRB)	33
2.	Miho Bošković (CRO)	21
3.	Tamás Kásás (HUN)	20
4.	Guillermo Molina (ESP)	18
	Georgios Ntoskas (GRE)	18
