= Water polo at the 2005 World Aquatics Championships – Men's tournament =

Tournament details
- Venue: Canada (in Montréal host cities)
- Dates: 18 – 30 July
- Teams: 16 (from 5 confederations)

Final positions
- Champions: Serbia and Montenegro (3rd title)
- Runners-up: Hungary
- Third place: Greece
- Fourth place: Croatia

Tournament statistics
- Matches played: 48
- Goals scored: 740 (15.42 per match)
- Top scorers: (Serbia and Montenegro) Aleksandar Šapić (26 goals)

Awards
- Best player: (Serbia and Montenegro) Aleksandar Šapić

The 2005 Men's World Water Polo Championship was the eleventh edition of the men's water polo tournament at the World Aquatics Championships, organised by the world governing body in aquatics, the FINA. The tournament was held in a temporary pool on Île Sainte-Hélène from 18 to 30 July 2005, and was incorporated into the 2005 World Aquatics Championships in Montréal, Canada.

== Participating teams ==
| Africa | Americas | Asia | Europe | Oceania |
|---|---|---|---|---|
| South Africa | Canada; Cuba; United States | China; Japan | Croatia; Germany; Greece; Hungary; Italy; Romania; Russia; Serbia and Montenegro; Spain | Australia |

=== Groups formed ===
Group A

- Italy
- Russia
- South Africa
- Spain

Group B

- Cuba
- Japan
- Serbia and Montenegro
- United States

Group C

- Canada
- Croatia
- Hungary
- Romania

Group D

- Australia
- China
- Germany
- Greece

== Preliminary round ==
| Qualified for the quarterfinals |
| Qualified for the playoff round |
| Will play for places 13–16 |

=== Group A ===
| Pos | Team | Pts | Pld | W | D | L | GF | GA | GD |
|---|---|---|---|---|---|---|---|---|---|
| 1 | Russia | 6 | 3 | 3 | 0 | 0 | 24 | 18 | +6 |
| 2 | Spain | 4 | 3 | 2 | 0 | 1 | 25 | 17 | +8 |
| 3 | Italy | 2 | 3 | 1 | 0 | 2 | 24 | 16 | +8 |
| 4 | South Africa | 0 | 3 | 0 | 0 | 3 | 15 | 37 | −22 |

- Monday July 18, 2005

| Russia | 11 – 7 | South Africa |
| Spain | 7 – 5 | Italy |

- Wednesday July 20, 2005

| Spain | 11 – 4 | South Africa |
| Russia | 5 – 4 | Italy |

- Friday July 22, 2005

| Russia | 8 – 7 | Spain |
| Italy | 15 – 4 | South Africa |

=== Group B ===
| Pos | Team | Pts | Pld | W | D | L | GF | GA | GD |
|---|---|---|---|---|---|---|---|---|---|
| 1 | Serbia and Montenegro | 6 | 3 | 3 | 0 | 0 | 46 | 10 | +36 |
| 2 | United States | 4 | 3 | 2 | 0 | 1 | 24 | 18 | +6 |
| 3 | Cuba | 2 | 3 | 1 | 0 | 2 | 16 | 42 | −26 |
| 4 | Japan | 0 | 3 | 0 | 0 | 3 | 17 | 33 | −16 |

- Monday July 18, 2005

| United States | 7 – 4 | Japan |
| Serbia and Montenegro | 21 – 1 | Cuba |

- Wednesday July 20, 2005

| Serbia and Montenegro | 17 – 5 | Japan |
| United States | 13 – 6 | Cuba |

- Friday July 22, 2005

| Cuba | 9 – 8 | Japan |
| Serbia and Montenegro | 8 – 4 | United States |

=== Group C ===
| Pos | Team | Pts | Pld | W | D | L | GF | GA | GD |
|---|---|---|---|---|---|---|---|---|---|
| 1 | Hungary | 6 | 3 | 3 | 0 | 0 | 35 | 11 | +24 |
| 2 | Croatia | 4 | 3 | 2 | 0 | 1 | 29 | 18 | +11 |
| 3 | Romania | 2 | 3 | 1 | 0 | 2 | 18 | 22 | −4 |
| 4 | Canada | 0 | 3 | 0 | 0 | 3 | 9 | 40 | −31 |

- Monday July 18, 2005

| Hungary | 14 – 4 | Romania |
| Croatia | 19 – 4 | Canada |

- Wednesday July 20, 2005

| Croatia | 6 – 4 | Romania |
| Hungary | 11 – 3 | Canada |

- Friday July 22, 2005

| Hungary | 10 – 4 | Croatia |
| Romania | 10 – 2 | Canada |

=== Group D ===
| Pos | Team | Pts | Pld | W | D | L | GF | GA | GD |
|---|---|---|---|---|---|---|---|---|---|
| 1 | Greece | 6 | 3 | 3 | 0 | 0 | 29 | 16 | +13 |
| 2 | Germany | 4 | 3 | 2 | 0 | 1 | 24 | 22 | +2 |
| 3 | Australia | 2 | 3 | 1 | 0 | 2 | 27 | 25 | +2 |
| 4 | China | 0 | 3 | 0 | 0 | 3 | 16 | 33 | −17 |

- Monday July 18, 2005

| Greece | 11 – 4 | China |
| Germany | 9 – 8 | Australia |

- Wednesday July 20, 2005

| Greece | 8 – 4 | Germany |
| Australia | 11 – 6 | China |

- Friday July 22, 2005

| Germany | 11 – 6 | China |
| Greece | 10 – 8 | Australia |

== Final round ==
=== Finals ===
Play-off; 24 July 2005
Croatia | 10
Australia | 6
Romania | 7
Germany | 5
Spain | 17
Cuba | 2
Italy | 6
(United States) USA | 5

Quarterfinals; 26 July 2005
Croatia | 6
Russia | 4
Serbia and Montenegro | 10
Romania | 8
Hungary | 8
Spain | 4
Greece | 13
Italy | 9

Semifinals; 28 July 2005
Serbia and Montenegro | 5
Croatia | 4
Hungary | 7
Greece | 6

Final; 30 July 2005
Serbia and Montenegro | 8
Hungary | 7
Third place
Greece | 11
Croatia | 10

=== 5th-8th place ===
5th–8th place
28 July 2005
Russia | 7
Romania | 11
28 July 2005
Spain | 7
Italy | 4

5th / 6th place
30 July 2005
Romania | 7
Spain | 8
7th / 8th place
30 July 2005
Russia | 7
Italy | 6

=== 9th-12th place ===
9th–12th place
26 July 2005
Australia | 16
Cuba | 3
26 July 2005
Germany | 5
(United States) USA | 3

9th / 10th place
28 July 2005
Australia | 5
Germany | 11
11th / 12th place
28 July 2005
Cuba | 6
(United States) USA | 10

=== 13th-16th place ===
13th–16th place
24 July 2005
South Africa | 8
Japan | 13
24 July 2005
Canada | 11
China | 5

13th / 14th place
26 July 2005
Canada | 10
Japan | 8
15th / 16th place
26 July 2005
South Africa | 7
China | 6

== Playoff round ==
- Sunday July 24, 2005

| Spain | 17 – 2 | Cuba |
| Italy | 6 – 5 | United States |
| Croatia | 10 – 6 | Australia |
| Romania | 7 – 5 | Germany |

== Classification round ==
- Sunday July 24, 2005 — 13th/16th place

| South Africa | 8 – 13 | Japan |
| Canada | 11 – 5 | China |

- Tuesday July 26, 2005 — 9th/12th place

| Australia | 16 – 3 | Cuba |
| Germany | 5 – 3 | United States |

- Thursday July 28, 2005 — 5th/8th place

| Russia | 7 – 11 | Romania |
| Spain | 7 – 4 | Italy |

== Quarter finals ==
- Tuesday July 26, 2005

| Croatia | 6 – 4 | Russia |
| Serbia and Montenegro | 10 – 8 | Romania |
| Hungary | 8 – 4 | Spain |
| Greece | 13 – 9 | Italy |

== Semi finals ==
- Thursday July 28, 2005

| Hungary | 7 – 6 | Greece |
| Serbia and Montenegro | 5 – 4 | Croatia |

== Finals ==
- Tuesday July 26, 2005 — 15th place

| South Africa | 7 – 6 | China |

- Tuesday July 26, 2005 — 13th place

| Canada | 10 – 8 | Japan |

- Thursday July 28, 2005 — 11th place

| Cuba | 6 – 10 | United States |

- Thursday July 28, 2005 — 9th place

| Australia | 5 – 11 | Germany |

- Saturday July 30, 2005 — 7th place

| Russia | 7 – 6 | Italy |

- Saturday July 30, 2005 — 5th place

| Romania | 7 – 8 | Spain |

- Saturday July 30, 2005 — Bronze-medal match

| Greece | 11 – 10 | Croatia |

- Saturday July 30, 2005 — Gold-medal match

| Serbia and Montenegro | 8 – 7 | Hungary |

== Final ranking ==
| 1st place, gold medalist(s) | Serbia and Montenegro |
| 2nd place, silver medalist(s) | Hungary |
| 3rd place, bronze medalist(s) | Greece |
| 4 | Croatia |
| 5 | Spain |
| 6 | Romania |
| 7 | Russia |
| 8 | Italy |
| 9 | Germany |
| 10 | Australia |
| 11 | United States |
| 12 | Cuba |
| 13 | Canada |
| 14 | Japan |
| 15 | South Africa |
| 16 | China |

2005 FINA Men's World champions

Serbia and Montenegro
Third title

Team roster

Denis Šefik, Petar Trbojević, Nikola Janović, Vanja Udovičić, Dejan Savić, Danilo Ikodinović, Slobodan Nikić, Vladimir Gojković, Boris Zloković, Aleksandar Šapić, Vladimir Vujasinović, Predrag Jokić, Zdravko Radić
Head coach: Petar Porobić

== Medalists ==
| Gold | Silver | Bronze |
|---|---|---|
| Serbia and Montenegro Denis Šefik; Petar Trbojević; Nikola Janović; Vanja Udovičić; Dejan Savić; Danilo Ikodinović; Slobodan Nikić; Vladimir Gojković; Boris Zloković; Aleksandar Šapić; Vladimir Vujasinović (c); Predrag Jokić; Zdravko Radić Head coach Petar Porobić | Hungary Zoltán Szécsi; Dániel Varga; Norbert Madaras; Ádám Steinmetz; Tamás Kásás; Attila Vári; Gergely Kiss; Csaba Kiss; Rajmund Fodor; Márton Szívós; István Gergely; Tamás Molnár; Péter Biros Head coach Dénes Kemény | Greece Georgios Reppas; Anastasios Schizas; Dimitrios Mazis; Emmanouil Mylonakis; Theodoros Chatzitheodorou; Argyris Theodoropoulos; Christos Afroudakis; Georgios Ntoskas; Georgios Afroudakis (c); Stefanos-Petros Santa; Antonios Vlontakis; Manthos Voulgarakis; Nikolaos Deligiannis Head coach Sandro Campagna |

== Individual awards ==
- Most Valuable Player

- Aleksandar Šapić (SCG)

- Best Goalkeeper

- Alexander Tchigir (GER)

- Topscorer

- Aleksandar Šapić (SCG) — 26 goals
