= Water polo at the 1997 Mediterranean Games =

The water polo competition at the 1997 Mediterranean Games was held in Bari, Italy. It was contested by men only.

== Medalists ==
Event	Gold	Silver	Bronze
Men's Competition	Yugoslavia	Croatia	Spain

== Standings ==
Men's Competition

Rank	Team
1st place, gold medalist(s)	Yugoslavia
2nd place, silver medalist(s)	Croatia
3rd place, bronze medalist(s)	Spain
4	Italy
