= 2006 FINA Men's Water Polo World League =

- League: FINA Water Polo World League
- Sport: Water Polo
- Duration: 10 July – 6 August 2006
- League champions: Serbia and Montenegro

FINA Men's Water Polo World League seasons
- ← 2005 2007 →

The 2006 FINA Men's Water Polo World League was the fifth edition of the annual event, organised by the world's governing body in aquatics, the FINA. After a preliminary round and a semifinal round, the Super Final was held in Athens, Greece.

== Preliminary round ==
Three teams from each pool advanced to the semifinal round. The semifinal round hosts (Spain and the United States) were guaranteed qualification, as was the Super Final host (Greece).

=== Group A ===
Rank	Team	G	W	OTW	OTL	L	GF	GA	Diff	Points
1	Australia	6	6	0	0	0	76	42	+34	18
2	France	6	3	0	0	3	70	68	+2	9
3	China	6	2	0	0	4	49	63	–14	6
4	Japan	6	1	0	0	5	64	86	–22	3

=== Group B ===
Rank	Team	G	W	OTW	OTL	L	GF	GA	Diff	Points
1	United States	2	2	0	0	0	29	13	+16	6
2	Canada	2	1	0	0	1	18	21	–3	3
2	Brazil	2	0	0	0	2	8	21	–13	0

=== Group C ===
Rank	Team	G	W	OTW	OTL	L	GF	GA	Diff	Points
1	Serbia and Montenegro	6	4	0	0	2	64	54	+10	12
2	Croatia	6	4	0	0	2	74	57	+17	12
3	Spain	6	3	0	0	3	56	69	–13	9
4	Russia	6	1	0	0	5	50	64	–14	3

=== Group D ===
Rank	Team	G	W	OTW	OTL	L	GF	GA	Diff	Points
1	Romania	6	4	1	0	1	64	57	+7	14
2	Germany	6	4	0	0	2	55	51	+4	12
3	Greece	6	2	0	1	3	54	62	–8	7
4	Italy	6	1	0	0	5	55	58	–3	3

== Semifinal round ==
Three teams from each pool advanced to the final round. The final round hosts (Greece) were guaranteed qualification.

=== Group A ===
Rank	Team	G	W	OTW	OTL	L	GF	GA	Diff	Points
1	United States	5	4	1	0	0	67	22	+45	14
2	Australia	5	4	0	1	0	54	27	+27	13
3	France	5	3	0	0	2	35	35	0	9
4	China	5	2	0	0	3	25	50	–25	6
5	Canada	5	1	0	0	4	35	49	–14	3
6	Brazil	5	0	0	0	5	24	57	–33	0

=== Group B ===
Rank	Team	G	W	OTW	OTL	L	GF	GA	Diff	Points
1	Serbia and Montenegro	5	5	0	0	0	54	29	+25	15
2	Spain	5	4	0	0	1	55	37	+18	12
3	Croatia	5	3	0	0	2	47	35	+12	9
4	Greece	5	2	0	0	3	36	45	–2	6
5	Germany	5	1	0	0	4	37	55	–18	3
6	Romania	5	0	0	0	5	33	61	–28	0

== Super Final ==
=== Group round ===
The top two teams advanced to the final, while the other four played for bronze.

Rank	Team	G	W	OTW	OTL	L	GF	GA	Diff	Points
1	Serbia and Montenegro	5	5	0	0	0	68	34	+34	15
2	Spain	5	4	0	0	1	53	33	+20	12
3	United States	5	2	1	0	2	41	46	–5	8
4	Greece	5	2	0	0	3	43	51	–8	6
5	Australia	5	1	0	1	3	44	47	–3	4
6	France	5	0	0	0	5	33	71	–38	0

=== 3rd to 6th place playoffs ===
Australia	10–10 (4–3 p.)	United States
Greece	14–7	France

=== 5th place match ===
United States	11-4	France

=== Bronze medal match ===
Greece	11–10	Australia

=== Gold medal match ===
Serbia and Montenegro	6–4	Spain

== Final ranking ==
Rank	Team
1st place, gold medalist(s)	Serbia and Montenegro
2nd place, silver medalist(s)	Spain
3rd place, bronze medalist(s)	Greece
4	Australia
5	United States
6	France

2006 FINA Men's World League

Serbia and Montenegro
Second title

=== Awards ===
Top Scorer
(France) Frédéric Audon
