= 2001 Men's European Water Polo Championship =

The 2001 Men's European Water Polo Championship was the 25th edition of the bi-annual event, organised by the Europe's governing body in aquatics, the Ligue Européenne de Natation. The event took place in Budapest, Hungary from June 15 to June 24, 2001.

== Teams ==
GROUP A

- Hungary
- Italy
- Netherlands
- Romania
- Spain
- Yugoslavia

GROUP B

- Croatia
- France
- Germany
- Greece
- Russia
- Slovakia

== Preliminary round ==
=== GROUP A ===
	Team	Points	G	W	D	L	GF	GA	Diff
1.	Yugoslavia	10	5	5	0	0	47	32	+15
2.	Hungary	8	5	4	0	1	44	30	+14
3.	Spain	6	5	3	0	2	30	28	+2
4.	Italy	4	5	2	0	3	39	35	+4
5.	Netherlands	1	5	0	1	4	24	40	−16
6.	Romania	1	5	0	1	4	25	44	−19

- Friday June 15, 2001

Yugoslavia	9–7	Spain
Romania	5–12	Hungary
Netherlands	4–10	Italy

- Saturday June 16, 2001

Spain	5–7	Hungary
Italy	9–4	Romania
Yugoslavia	10–7	Netherlands

- Sunday June 17, 2001

Hungary	10–5	Italy
Netherlands	0–4	Spain
Yugoslavia	11–5	Romania

- Monday June 18, 2001

Spain	8–7	Italy
Yugoslavia	8–5	Hungary
Netherlands	6–6	Romania

- Tuesday June 19, 2001

Italy	8–9	Yugoslavia
Hungary	10–7	Netherlands
Romania	5–6	Spain

=== GROUP B ===
	Team	Points	G	W	D	L	GF	GA	Diff
1.	Greece	9	5	4	1	0	48	35	+13
2.	Croatia	6	5	2	2	1	41	31	+10
3.	Russia	6	5	3	0	2	47	36	+11
4.	Slovakia	5	5	2	1	2	48	52	−4
5.	Germany	4	5	2	0	3	35	33	+2
6.	France	0	5	0	0	5	27	59	−32

- Friday June 15, 2001

Germany	4–7	Greece
France	4–13	Russia
Slovakia	10–9	Croatia

- Saturday June 16, 2001

Greece	10–7	Russia
Croatia	12–3	France
Germany	9–9	Slovakia

- Sunday June 17, 2001

Russia	6–8	Croatia
Slovakia	8–14	Greece
France	3–11	Germany

- Monday June 18, 2001

Greece	7–7	Croatia
Germany	6–9	Russia
Slovakia	13–8	France

- Tuesday June 19, 2001

Croatia	5–5	Germany
Russia	12–8	Slovakia
France	9–10	Greece

== Quarterfinals ==
- Thursday June 21, 2001

Croatia	7–6	Spain
Hungary	10–9	Russia
Italy	7–6	Greece
Yugoslavia	8–7	Slovakia

== Semifinals ==
- Friday June 22, 2001

Italy	8–7	Hungary
Yugoslavia	8–6	Croatia

== Finals ==
- Saturday June 23, 2001 — Seventh place

Greece	8–4	Slovakia

- Saturday June 23, 2001 — Fifth place

Russia	8–5	Spain

- Sunday June 24, 2001 — Bronze Medal

Hungary	12–9	Croatia

- Sunday June 24, 2001 — Gold Medal

Yugoslavia	8–5	Italy

== Final ranking ==
RANK	TEAM
	Yugoslavia
	Italy
	Hungary
4.	Croatia
5.	Russia
6.	Spain
7.	Greece
8.	Slovakia
9.	Germany
10.	Netherlands
11.	Romania
12.	France

2001 Men's European champion

Yugoslavia
Second title

== Individual awards ==
- Most Valuable Player
  - Vladimir Vujasinović (YUG)
- Best Goalkeeper
  - Francesco Attolico (ITA)
- Best Scorer
  - Aleksandr Yeryshov (RUS) — 21 goals
