= 2005 FINA Men's Water Polo World League =

- League: FINA Water Polo World League
- Sport: Water Polo
- Duration: 16 June – 14 August 2005
- League champions: Serbia and Montenegro

FINA Men's Water Polo World League seasons
- ← 2004 2006 →

The 2005 FINA Men's Water Polo World League was the fourth edition of the annual event, organised by the world's governing body in aquatics, the FINA. After a preliminary round and a semifinal round, the Super Final was held in Belgrade, Serbia and Montenegro.

== Preliminary round ==
Five teams from each pool advanced to the semifinal round. The semifinal round hosts (Canada and the United States) were guaranteed qualification, as was the Super Final host (Serbia and Montenegro).

=== Group A ===
Rank	Team	G	W	L	GF	GA	Diff	Points
1	Hungary	6	6	0	93	40	+53	18
2	Spain	6	4	2	70	51	+19	14
3	Russia	6	4	2	56	51	+5	14
4	Greece	6	4	2	76	56	+20	13
5	Australia	6	2	4	52	29	+23	10
6	China	6	1	5	29	81	–52	8
7	Canada	6	0	6	31	74	–43	6

=== Group B ===
Rank	Team	G	W	L	GF	GA	Diff	Points
1	Serbia and Montenegro	6	6	0	78	36	+42	18
2	Croatia	6	4	2	75	61	+14	14
3	United States	6	4	2	50	51	–1	14
4	Italy	6	3	3	60	51	+9	12
5	Germany	6	3	3	55	58	–3	12
6	Romania	6	1	5	48	62	–14	8
7	Brazil	6	0	6	28	75	–47	6

== Semifinal round ==
Three teams from each pool advanced to the final round. The final round hosts (Serbia and Montenegro) were guaranteed qualification.

=== Group A ===
Rank	Team	G	W	L	GF	GA	Diff	Points
1	Greece	4	3	1	49	41	+8	10
2	Serbia and Montenegro	4	3	1	43	28	+15	10
3	Germany	4	2	2	37	39	–2	8
4	Spain	4	2	2	52	47	+5	7
5	Canada	4	0	4	23	49	–26	4

=== Group B ===
Rank	Team	G	W	L	GF	GA	Diff	Points
1	Hungary	4	3	1	41	28	+13	10
2	Croatia	4	2	2	38	34	+4	8
3	Russia	4	2	2	31	34	–3	8
4	Italy	4	2	2	33	35	–2	8
5	United States	4	1	3	24	36	–12	6

== Super Final ==
=== Group round ===
The top two teams advanced to the final, while the next two played for bronze.

Rank	Team	G	W	L	GF	GA	Diff	Points
1	Serbia and Montenegro	3	3	0	28	23	+5	9
2	Hungary	3	2	1	38	29	+9	7
3	Croatia	3	2	1	31	22	+9	7
4	Germany	3	1	2	26	38	–12	5
5	Russia	3	1	2	25	26	–1	4
6	Greece	3	0	3	23	33	–10	3

=== 5th place match ===
Greece	14-9	Russia

=== Bronze medal match ===
Germany	10–8	Croatia

=== Gold medal match ===
Serbia and Montenegro	16–6	Hungary

== Final ranking ==
Rank	Team
1st place, gold medalist(s)	Serbia and Montenegro
2nd place, silver medalist(s)	Hungary
3rd place, bronze medalist(s)	Germany
4	Croatia
5	Greece
6	Russia

2005 FINA Men's World League

Serbia and Montenegro
First title

=== Awards ===
Top Scorer
(Serbia and Montenegro) Aleksandar Šapić
