= 1997 Men's European Water Polo Championship =

Water sport competitions

The 1997 Men's European Water Polo Championship was the 23rd edition of the bi-annual event, organised by the Europe's governing body in aquatics, the Ligue Européenne de Natation. The event took place in Seville, Spain from August 13 to August 22, 1997, as an integrated part of the European LC Championships 1997.

== Teams ==
GROUP A

- Bulgaria
- Germany
- Greece
- Italy
- Russia
- Yugoslavia

GROUP B

- Croatia
- Hungary
- Netherlands
- Slovakia
- Spain
- Ukraine

== First round ==
=== GROUP A ===
	Team	Points	G	W	D	L	GF	GA	Diff
1.	Russia	9	5	4	1	0	36	23	+13
2.	Yugoslavia	9	5	4	1	0	32	20	+12
3.	Italy	6	5	3	0	2	38	20	+18
4.	Greece	3	5	1	1	3	27	30	−3
5.	Germany	3	5	1	1	3	34	38	−4
6.	Bulgaria	0	5	0	0	5	23	59	−36

- August 13, 1997

Russia	13–4	Bulgaria
Yugoslavia	10–5	Germany
Greece	2–7	Italy

- August 14, 1997

Italy	8–4	Germany
Russia	7–6	Greece
Bulgaria	4–9	Yugoslavia

- August 15, 1997

Greece	8–4	Bulgaria
Germany	6–8	Russia
Italy	3–4	Yugoslavia

- August 16, 1997

Bulgaria	5–16	Italy
Russia	3–3	Yugoslavia
Greece	6–6	Germany

- August 17, 1997

Germany	13–6	Bulgaria
Yugoslavia	6–5	Greece
Russia	5–4	Italy

=== GROUP B ===
	Team	Points	G	W	D	L	GF	GA	Diff
1.	Croatia	9	5	4	1	0	34	29	+5
2.	Hungary	8	5	3	2	0	49	26	+23
3.	Spain	7	5	3	1	1	40	25	+15
4.	Slovakia	4	5	2	0	3	34	33	+1
5.	Netherlands	2	5	1	0	4	23	36	−13
6.	Ukraine	0	5	0	0	5	17	48	−31

- August 13, 1997

Slovakia	6–4	Netherlands
Hungary	13–3	Ukraine
Spain	7–8	Croatia

- August 14, 1997

Netherlands	10–4	Ukraine
Spain	9–5	Slovakia
Croatia	7–7	Hungary

- August 15, 1997

Hungary	12–6	Slovakia
Croatia	7–3	Ukraine
Spain	7–3	Netherlands

- August 16, 1997

Croatia	9–3	Netherlands
Slovakia	8–5	Ukraine
Spain	7–7	Hungary

- August 17, 1997

Croatia	9–3	Slovakia
Netherlands	3–10	Hungary
Spain	10–2	Ukraine

== Quarterfinals ==
Croatia	5–4	Greece
Russia	11–6	Slovakia
Hungary	8–7	Italy
Yugoslavia	10–9	Spain

Greece	3–7	Spain
Italy	12–9	Slovakia

== Semifinals ==
Yugoslavia	8–7	Croatia
Hungary	10–7	Russia

== Finals ==
- Ninth place

Netherlands	10–7	Germany

- Seventh place

Greece	13–9	Slovakia

- Fifth place

Spain	8–6	Italy

- Third place

Russia	9 – 8 [aet]	Croatia

- First place

Hungary	3–2	Yugoslavia

== Final ranking ==
RANK	TEAM
	Hungary
	Yugoslavia
	Russia
4.	Croatia
5.	Spain
6.	Italy
7.	Greece
8.	Slovakia
9.	Netherlands
10.	Germany
11.	Bulgaria
12.	Ukraine

1997 Men's European champion

Hungary
Eleventh title

- The first eight teams qualified for the 1998 FINA Men's World Water Polo Championship in Perth, Australia; Bulgaria and Ukraine were relegated.
