= 2004 FINA Men's Water Polo World League =

- League: FINA Water Polo World League
- Sport: Water Polo
- Duration: 11 June – 18 July 2004
- League champions: Hungary

FINA Men's Water Polo World League seasons
- ← 2003 2005 →

The 2004 FINA Men's Water Polo World League was the third edition of the annual event, organised by the world's governing body in aquatics, the FINA. After a preliminary round, the Super Final was held in Long Beach, United States.

== Preliminary round ==
Group winners advanced to the semifinals, while the second and third placed teams in each pool competed in the quarterfinals. The bottom team in each pool was eliminated.

=== Group A ===
Rank	Team	G	W	L	GF	GA	Diff	Points
1	Italy	12	10	2	122	84	+38	32
2	Greece	12	7	5	132	107	+25	26
3	Spain	12	7	5	109	93	+16	26
4	Brazil	12	0	12	65	144	–79	12

=== Group B ===
Rank	Team	G	W	L	GF	GA	Diff	Points
1	Hungary	12	9	3	128	101	+27	30
2	Serbia and Montenegro	12	8	4	138	108	+30	28
3	United States	12	5	7	113	121	–8	22
4	Australia	12	2	10	99	148	–49	16

== Super Final ==
=== Quarterfinals ===
Greece	13–12	United States
Serbia and Montenegro	7–5	Spain

=== Semifinals ===
Hungary	10–5	Greece
Serbia and Montenegro	10–7	Italy

=== Fifth-place match ===
Spain	11–10	United States

=== Bronze medal match ===
Greece	12–9	Italy

=== Gold medal match ===
Hungary	12–8	Serbia and Montenegro

== Final rankings ==
RANK	Team
1st place, gold medalist(s)	Hungary
2nd place, silver medalist(s)	Serbia and Montenegro
3rd place, bronze medalist(s)	Greece
4	Italy
5	Spain
6	United States
7	Australia
8	Brazil

2004 FINA Men's World League

Hungary
Second title

=== Awards ===
Top Scorer
(Serbia and Montenegro) Aleksandar Šapić
