= 2001 Men's European Water Polo Championship squads =

This article shows all participating team squads at the 2001 Men's European Water Polo Championship.

== Yugoslavia ==
No.	Name	Date of birth	Club
1	Aleksandar Šoštar	21 January 1964	(Federal Republic of Yugoslavia) Bečej
2	Petar Trbojević	9 September 1973	(Spain) Barceloneta
3	Nikola Kuljača	16 August 1974	
4	Predrag Zimonjić	15 October 1970	
5	Dejan Savić	24 April 1975	
6	Danilo Ikodinović	4 October 1976	(Italy) Pro Recco
7	Viktor Jelenić	31 October 1970	
8	Veljko Uskoković	29 March 1971	
9	Aleksandar Ćirić	30 December 1977	
10	Aleksandar Šapić	1 June 1978	(Federal Republic of Yugoslavia) Bečej
11	Vladimir Vujasinović	14 August 1973	(Italy) Pro Recco
12	Nenad Vukanić	16 May 1974	
13	Branko Peković	7 March 1979	
14	Denis Šefik	20 September 1976	
Head coach: Nenad Manojlović

== Italy ==
No.	Name	Date of birth	Club
1	Francesco Attolico	23 March 1963	(Italy) Posillipo
2	Francesco Postiglione	29 April 1972	(Italy) Posillipo
3	Leonardo Binchi	27 August 1975	(Italy) Florentia
4	Fabrizio Buonocore	28 April 1977	(Italy) Canottieri Napoli
5	Bogdan Rath	28 June 1972	(Italy) Posillipo
6	Roberto Calcaterra	2 February 1972	(Italy) Florentia
7	Federico Mistrangelo	11 May 1981	(Italy) Savona
8	Alberto Angelini	28 September 1974	(Italy) Pro Recco
9	Maurizio Felugo	4 March 1981	(Italy) Savona
10	Alessandro Calcaterra	26 May 1975	(Italy) Pro Recco
11	Leonardo Sottani	1 November 1973	(Italy) Florentia
12	Carlo Silipo	10 September 1971	(Italy) Posillipo
13	Fabio Bencivenga	20 January 1976	(Italy) Posillipo
14	Goran Fiorentini	21 September 1981	(Italy) Leonessa
15	Fabio Violetti		
Head coach: Alessandro Campagna

== Hungary ==
No.	Name	Date of birth	Club
1	Zoltán Kósz	26 November 1967	(Hungary) Vasas
2	Bulcsú Székely	2 June 1976	(Hungary) Vasas
3	Tamás Märcz	14 July 1974	(Italy) Savona
4	Zsolt Varga	9 March 1972	(Italy) Savona
5	Tamás Kásás	20 July 1976	(Italy) Posillipo
6	Attila Vári	26 February 1976	(Hungary) Vasas
7	Gergely Kiss	21 September 1977	(Hungary) Honvéd
8	Tibor Benedek	12 July 1972	(Italy) Pro Recco
9	Rajmund Fodor	21 February 1976	(Italy) Florentia
10	Zoltán Szécsi	22 December 1977	(Hungary) BVSC
11	Barnabás Steinmetz	6 October 1975	(Italy) Posillipo
12	Tamás Molnár	2 August 1975	(Hungary) Honvéd
13	Péter Biros	15 April 1976	(Hungary) Honvéd
14	Csaba Kiss	6 June 1978	(Spain) Sabadell
15	Tamás Varga	14 July 1975	(Hungary) Vasas
Head coach: Dénes Kemény

== Croatia ==
No.	Name
1	Frano Vićan
2	Aljoša Kunac
3	Mario Oreb
4	Slavko Letica
5	Teo Đogaš
6	Ratko Štritof
7	Mile Smodlaka
8	Ivo Ivaniš
9	Danijel Benić
10	Samir Barać
11	Igor Hinić
12	Tomislav Primorac
13	Vjekoslav Kobešćak
14	Višeslav Sarić
15	Goran Volarević

== Russia ==
No.	Name
1	Aleksandr Aksenov
2	Roman Balashov
3	Aleksandr Yeryshov
4	Sergey Garbuzov
5	Yuri Yatsev
6	Nikolay Kozlov
7	Alexey Panfili
8	Ilya Smirnov
9	Marat Zakirov
10	Irek Zinnurov
11	Aleksandr Fyodorov
12	Revaz Chomakhidze
13	Dmitry Gorshkov
14	Andrei Rekechinski
15	Sergey Gubarev

== Spain ==
No.	Name
1	Jesús Rollán
2	Guillermo Molina
3	Sergi Pedrerol
4	Gustavo Marcos
5	Xavier García
6	Daniel Ballart
7	Gabriel Hernández
8	Iván Moro
9	Javier Sánchez
10	Salvador Gómez
11	Iván Pérez
12	Carles Sanz
13	Daniel Moro
14	Daniel Cercols
15	Ángel Andreo

== Greece ==
No.	Name
1	Georgios Reppas
2	Georgios Afroudakis
3	Dimitrios Mazis
4	Nikolaos Deligiannis
5	Filippos Karampetsos
6	Konstantinos Dandolos
7	Konstantinos Loudis
8	Theodoros Chatzitheodorou
9	Antonios Vlontakis
10	Anastasios Schizas
11	Nikolaos Stellatos
12	Ioannis Kocheilas
13	Artin Elmisian
14	Vasilios Vamvounakis
15	Ioannis Avgoustianakis

== Slovakia ==
No.	Name
1	Štefan Gergely
2	Peter Nižný
3	Juraj Zaťovič
4	Jozef Hrošík
5	Peter Veszelits
6	Michal Gergely
7	Karol Bačo
8	Milan Cipov
9	Gejza Gyurcsi
10	Tomáš Brúder
11	Sergej Charin
12	Róbert Kaid
13	Martin Mravík
14	Juraj Sakáč
15	Michal Gogola

== Germany ==
No.	Name
1	Alexander Tchigir
2	Thomas Schertwitis
3	Jens Pohlmann
4	Steffen Dierolf
5	Patrick Weissinger
6	Tobias Kreuzmann
7	Tim Wollthan
8	Björn Kohle
9	Tilo Kaiser
10	Sören Mackeben
11	Marc Politze
12	Michael Zellmer
13	Daniele Polverino
14	Timo Purschke
15	Florian Müller

== Netherlands ==
No.	Name	Club
1	Arie van de Bunt	(Netherlands) AZ&PC
2	Gijs de Kock	(Netherlands) AZ&PC
3	Jeroen Cavaljé	(Netherlands) Polar Bears Ede
4	Kjell Boom	(Netherlands) AZC Alphen
5	Matthijs de Bruin	(France) Olympic Nice
6	Arno Havenga	(Netherlands) ZPB Barendrecht
7	Harry van der Meer	(Italy) RN Bogliasco
8	Gerben Silvis	(France) Olympic Nice
9	Tjerk Kramer	(Netherlands) AZC Alphen
10	Eelco Uri	(France) Olympic Nice
11	Marco Scheffer	(France) Olympic Nice
12	Marc Siewers	(Netherlands) HZC De Robben
13	Bjørn Boom	(Netherlands) AZC Alphen
14	Mark Smit	
15	Mike van Beukering	(Netherlands) AZ&PC

== Romania ==
No.	Name
1	Adrian Frăţilă
2	Cosmin Radu
3	Florin Muşat
4	Florin Bonca
5	Nicolae Diaconu
6	Kálmán Kádár
7	Andrei Creţu
8	Alexandru Matei
9	Ramses Juravle
10	Ionuț Angelescu
11	Andrei Iosep
12	Cătălin Radu
13	Eduard Andrei
14	Robert Fiereșteanu
15	Dragoș Stoenescu

== France ==
No.	Name
1	Benoît Bry
2	Tibor Varga
3	Oleg Pouzankov
4	Olivier Chandieu
5	Frédéric Audon
6	Mathieu Dierstein
7	Eric Priarone
8	Emmanuel Ducher
9	Sébastien Berenguel
10	Aurélien Cousin
11	Christophe Augier
12	Mathieu Peisson
13	Yann Clay
14	Jimmy Tomasini
15	Vincent De Nardi

== See also ==
- 2001 Women's European Water Polo Championship squads
