= 2003 Men's European Water Polo Championship squads =

This article shows all participating team squads at the 2003 Men's European Water Polo Championship, held in Kranj, Slovenia from 6–13 June 2003.

== Croatia ==
No.	Name	Date of birth	Club
1	Frano Vićan	24 January 1976	
2	Damir Burić	2 December 1980	
3	Hrvoje Herceg		
4	Dubravko Šimenc	2 November 1966	
5	Tihomil Vranješ	10 November 1977	
6	Ratko Štritof	14 January 1972	
7	Mile Smodlaka	1 January 1976	
8	Teo Đogaš	19 February 1977	
9	Nikola Franković	9 November 1982	
10	Samir Barać	2 November 1973	
11	Igor Hinić	4 December 1975	
12	Elvis Fatović	8 May 1971	
13	Vjekoslav Kobešćak	20 January 1974	
14	Ivo Ivaniš		
15	Goran Volarević	2 April 1977	(Croatia) Jug Dubrovnik
Head coach: Zoran Roje

== Germany ==
No.	Name	Date of birth
	Alexander Tchigir	6 November 1968
	Heiko Nossek	
	Patrick Weissinger	
	Christian Ingenlath	
	Marc Politze	
	Tim Wollthan	
	Thomas Schertwitis	
	Tobias Kreuzmann	
	Timo Purschke	
	Tilo Kaiser	
	Sören Mackeben	
	Jens Pohlmann	
	Steffen Dierolf	
	Fabian Schroedter	
Coach: Hagen Stamm

== Greece ==
No.	Name	Date of birth
	Georgios Reppas	
	Anastasios Schizas	
	Dimitrios Mazis	
	Konstantinos Loudis	
	Theodoros Chatzitheodorou	
	Argyris Theodoropoulos	
	Georgios Afroudakis	
	Christos Afroudakis	
	Theodoros Kalakonas	
	Antonios Vlontakis	
	Georgios Psychos	
	Ioannis Thomakos	
	Dimitrios Tsiklos	
	Nikolaos Deligiannis	
	Stefanos Santa	
Coach: Alessandro Campagna (ITA)

== Italy ==
No.	Name	Date of birth
	Stefano Tempesti	
	Francesco Postiglione	
	Andrea Mangiante	
	Bogdan Rath	
	Roberto Calcaterra	
	Federico Mistrangelo	
	Alberto Angelini	
	Maurizio Felugo	
	Alessandro Calcaterra	
	Luigi Di Costanzo	5 February 1982
	Carlo Silipo	10 September 1971
	Fabio Bencivenga	20 January 1976
	Goran Fiorentini	21 November 1981
	Fabrizio Buonocore	28 April 1977
Coach: Paolo De Crescenzo

== Netherlands ==
No.	Name	Date of birth
	Arie van de Bunt	7 June 1969
	Matthijs de Bruijn	27 May 1977
	Tjerk Kramer	25 March 1982
	Marco Booij	10 April 1973
	Arno Havenga	14 November 1974
	Mark Siewers	13 February 1977
	Ted Bader	
	Marco Scheffers	
	Eelco Uri	5 December 1973
	Bas de Jong	11 September 1973
	Gerben Silvis	6 January 1976
	Bjørn Boom	17 December 1975
	Kjell Boom	
Coach: Johan Aantjes

== Romania ==
No.	Name	Date of birth
	Robert Dinu	
	Cosmin Radu	
	Florin Muşat	
	Andrei Iosep	
	Nicolae Diaconu	
	Andrei Creţu	
	Robert Fiereșteanu	
	Ramses Juravle	
	Ionuț Angelescu	
	Kálmán Kádár	
	Eduard Andrei	
	Ramiro Georgescu	
	Adrian Frăţilă	
Coach: Liviu Răducanu

== Russia ==
No.	Name	Date of birth
	Maximov	
	Yuri Iatsev	
	Dmitry Irishichev	
	Nikolay Kozlov	
	Roman Balashov	
	Aleksandr Erishov	
	Revaz Chomakhidze	
	Dmitry Stratan	
	Marat Zakirov	
	Irek Zinnurov	
	Andrey Rekitchinski	
	Roman Dokuchayev	
	Fedorov	
	Alexei Agarkov	
Coach: Aleksandr Kabanov.

== Serbia and Montenegro ==
No.	Name	Date of birth	Club
1	Nikola Kuljača	16 August 1974	
2	Slobodan Nikić	25 January 1983	(Serbia and Montenegro)
4	Vanja Udovičić	12 September 1982	(Serbia and Montenegro)
5	Dejan Savić	24 April 1975	(Italy)
6	Danilo Ikodinović	4 October 1976	(Italy) Pro Recco
7	Viktor Jelenić	31 October 1970	(Italy)
8	Vladimir Gojković	29 January 1981	(Serbia and Montenegro) Jadran Herceg Novi
9	Aleksandar Ćirić	30 December 1977	(Italy) Leonessa
10	Aleksandar Šapić	1 June 1978	(Italy) Camogli
11	Vladimir Vujasinović	14 August 1973	(Italy) Pro Recco
12	Predrag Jokić	3 February 1983	(Serbia and Montenegro) Jadran Herceg Novi
13	Boris Zloković	16 March 1983	(Serbia and Montenegro) Jadran Herceg Novi
15	Denis Šefik	20 September 1976	(Serbia and Montenegro) Jadran Herceg Novi
Head coach: Nenad Manojlović

== Slovakia ==
No.	Name	Date of birth
	Michal Gogola	
	Peter Nižný	
	Juraj Zaťovič	
	Jozef Hrošík	
	Alexander Nagy	
	Karol Bačo	
	Milan Cipov	
	Martin Mravík	
	Michal Gergely	
	Tomáš Brúder	
	Róbert Kaid	
	Gejza Gyurcsi	
	Michal Hruška	
	Peter Veszelits	
Coach: Ondrej Gajdáč

== Slovenia ==
No.	Name	Date of birth
	Igor Belofastov	
	Vladimir Pajič	
	Aleksander Mertelj	
	Matej Nastran	
	Boban Antonijević	
	Tadej Peranovič	
	Teo Galič	
	Erik Bukovac	
	Jure Nastran	
	Primož Troppan	
	Krištof Štromajer	
	Žiga Balderman	
	Jernej Lovše	
Coach: Igor Štirn

== Spain ==
No.	Name	Date of birth
	Ángel Andreo	
	Felipe Perrone	
	Gustavo Marcos	
	Guillermo Molina	
	Xavier Vallès	
	Gabriel Hernández	
	Iván Moro	
	Daniel Ballart	
	Salvador Gómez	
	Iván Pérez	
	Javier Sánchez	
	Daniel Moro	
	Xavier García	
Head coach: Juan Jané

== Hungary ==
No.	Name	Date of birth	Club
1	Zoltán Szécsi	22 December 1977	(Hungary) BVSC
2	Gergely Katonás	25 February 1980	(Hungary) Ferencváros
3	Norbert Madaras	1 December 1979	(Hungary) Vasas
4	Zsolt Varga II.	24 May 1978	(Hungary) Vasas
5	Tamás Kásás	20 July 1976	(Hungary) Vasas
6	Attila Vári	26 February 1976	(Hungary) Honvéd
7	Gergely Kiss	21 September 1977	(Hungary) Honvéd
8	Tibor Benedek	12 July 1972	(Italy) Pro Recco
9	Rajmund Fodor	21 February 1976	(Hungary) Honvéd
10	Barnabás Steinmetz	6 October 1975	(Hungary) Vasas
11	Tamás Molnár	2 August 1975	(Hungary) Honvéd
12	Ádám Steinmetz	11 August 1980	(Hungary) Vasas
13	Péter Biros	15 April 1976	(Hungary) Honvéd
14	Csaba Kiss	6 June 1978	(Spain) Sabadell
15	Zoltán Kovács	26 May 1974	(Hungary) Honvéd
Head coach: Dénes Kemény
