= Water polo at the 2000 Summer Olympics – Men's team squads =

These are the rosters of all participating teams at the men's water polo tournament at the 2000 Summer Olympics in Sydney.

== Australia ==
The following players represented Australia:

- Sean Boyd
- Eddie Denis
- Andriy Kovalenko
- Daniel Marsden
- Craig Miller
- Tim Neesham
- Mark Oberman
- Rod Owen-Jones
- Rafael Sterk
- Nathan Thomas
- Grant Waterman
- Thomas Whalan
- Gavin Woods

== Croatia ==
The following players represented Croatia:

- Samir Barać
- Alen Bošković
- Elvis Fatović
- Igor Hinić
- Ivo Ivaniš
- Vjekoslav Kobešćak
- Ognjen Kržić
- Višeslav Sarić
- Mile Smodlaka
- Dubravko Šimenc
- Siniša Školneković
- Ratko Štritof
- Frano Vićan

== Greece ==
The following players represented Greece:

- Georgios Afroudakis
- Nikolaos Deligiannis
- Filippos Kaiafas
- Thomas Khatzis
- Theodoros Chatzitheodorou
- Theodoros Lorantos
- Konstantinos Loudis
- Georgios Mavrotas
- Dimitrios Mazis
- Georgios Psykhos
- Georgios Reppas
- Ioannis Thomakos
- Antonios Vlontakis

== Hungary ==
The following players represented Hungary:

- Tibor Benedek
- Péter Biros
- Rajmund Fodor
- Tamás Kásás
- Gergely Kiss
- Zoltan Kósz
- Tamás Marcz
- Tamás Molnár
- Barnabás Steinmetz
- Zoltán Szécsi
- Bulcsú Székely
- Zsolt Varga
- Attila Vári

== Italy ==
The following players represented Italy:

- Alberto Angelini
- Francesco Attolico
- Fabio Bencivenga
- Leonardo Binchi
- Alessandro Calcaterra
- Roberto Calcaterra
- Alberto Ghibellini
- Amedeo Pomilio
- Francesco Postiglione
- Carlo Silipo
- Leonardo Sottani
- Stefano Tempesti
- Antonio Vittorioso

== Kazakhstan ==
The following players represented Kazakhstan:

- Roman Chentsov
- Konstantin Chernov
- Sergey Drozdov
- Aleksandr Elke
- Askar Orazalinov
- Yevgeny Prokhin
- Artemy Sevostyanov
- Aleksandr Shvedov
- Yury Smolovoy
- Igor Zagoruyko
- Ivan Zaytsev
- Yevgeny Zhilyayev
- Denis Zhivchikov

== Netherlands ==
The following players represented the Netherlands:

- Marco Booij
- Bjørn Boom
- Bobbie Brebde
- Matthijs de Bruijn
- Arie van de Bunt
- Arno Havenga
- Bas de Jong
- Harry van der Meer
- Gerben Silvis
- Kimmo Thomas
- Eelco Uri
- Niels Zuidweg

== Russia ==
The following players represented Russia:

- Roman Balashov
- Revaz Chomakhidze
- Dmitri Dugin
- Sergei Garbuzov
- Dmitry Gorshkov
- Nikolay Kozlov
- Nikolay Maksimov
- Andrei Rekechinski
- Dmitry Stratan
- Yuri Yatsev
- Aleksandr Yeryshov
- Marat Zakirov
- Irek Zinnurov

== Slovakia ==
The following players represented Slovakia:

- Karol Bačo
- Sergej Charin
- Milan Cipov
- István Gergely
- Michal Gogola
- Gejza Gyurcsi
- Jozef Hrošík
- Róbert Káid
- Martin Mravík
- Alexander Nagy
- Peter Nižný
- Peter Veszelits
- Juraj Zaťovič

== Spain ==
The following players represented Spain:

- Ángel Andreo
- Daniel Ballart
- Manuel Estiarte
- Pedro Francisco García
- Salvador Gómez
- Gabriel Hernández
- Gustavo Marcos
- Daniel Moro
- Iván Moro
- Sergi Pedrerol
- Jesús Rollán
- Javier Sánchez
- Jordi Sans

== United States ==
The following players represented the United States:

- Gavin Arroyo
- Tony Azevedo
- Ryan Bailey
- Dan Hackett
- Chris Humbert
- Sean Kern
- Kyle Kopp
- Chi Kredell
- Robert Lynn
- Sean Nolan
- Chris Oeding
- Brad Schumacher
- Wolf Wigo

== Yugoslavia ==
The following players represented Yugoslavia:

- Aleksandar Ćirić
- Danilo Ikodinović
- Viktor Jelenić
- Nikola Kuljača
- Dejan Savić
- Aleksandar Šapić
- Aleksandar Šoštar
- Petar Trbojević
- Veljko Uskoković
- Jugoslav Vasović
- Vladimir Vujasinović
- Nenad Vukanić
- Predrag Zimonjić
