= 2008 Men's European Water Polo Championship squads =

This article shows all participating team squads at the 2008 Men's European Water Polo Championship.

== Croatia ==
No.	Name	Date of birth	Position
1	Frano Vican	24 January 1976	
2	Damir Buric	2 December 1980	
3	Andro Buslje	4 January 1986	
4	Zdeslav Vrdoljak	15 March 1971	
5	Aljosa Kunac	18 August 1980	
6	Maro Jokovic	1 October 1987	
7	Mile Smodlaka	1 January 1976	
8	Teo Dogas	19 February 1977	
9	Pavo Markovic	20 April 1985	
10	Samir Barac	2 November 1973	
11	Igor Hinic	4 December 1975	
12	Miho Boskovic	11 January 1983	
13	Sandro Sukno	30 June 1990	

== Germany ==
No.	Name	Date of birth	Position
1	Alexander Tchigir	6 November 1968	
2	Florian Naroska	16 April 1982	
3	Julian Real	22 December 1989	
4	Marko Savic	11 January 1981	
5	Steffen Dierolf	5 May 1976	
6	Marc Politze	20 October 1977	
7	Heiko Nossek	14 March 1982	
8	Thomas Schertwitis	2 September 1972	
9	Tobias Kreuzmann	15 June 1981	
10	Moritz Oeler	21 October 1985	
11	Andreas Schlotterbeck	2 March 1982	
12	Soren Mackeben	29 January 1979	
13	Michael Zellmer	14 August 1977	

== Greece ==
No.	Name	Date of birth	Position
1	Nikolaos Deligiannis	3 September 1976	goalkeeper
2	Anastasios Schizas	18 February 1977	centre back
3	Dimitrios Mazis	5 September 1976	centre back
4	Konstantinos Kokkinakis	9 October 1975	centre back
5	Ioannis Thomakos	14 March 1977	driver
6	Argyris Theodoropoulos	13 January 1981	driver
7	Christos Afroudakis	23 May 1984	driver
8	Georgios Ntoskas	11 November 1984	driver
9	Georgios Afroudakis	17 October 1976	centre forward
10	Dimitrios Miteloudis	11 February 1982	centre back
11	Antonios Vlontakis	10 October 1975	
12	Emmanouil Mylonakis	9 April 1985	driver
13	Geogios Reppas	11 December 1974	goalkeeper

== Hungary ==
No.	Name	Date of birth	Position
1	Zoltán Szécsi	22 December 1977	
2	Tamás Varga	14 July 1975	
3	Norbert Madaras	1 December 1979	
4	Dénes Varga	29 March 1987	
5	Tamás Kásás	20 July 1976	
6	Norbert Hosnyánszky	4 March 1984	
7	Gergely Kiss	21 September 1977	
8	Tibor Benedek	12 July 1972	
9	Dániel Varga	25 September 1983	
10	Péter Biros	5 April 1976	
11	Gábor Kis	27 September 1982	
12	Tamás Molnár	2 August 1975	
13	Viktor Nagy	24 July 1984	

== Italy ==
No.	Name	Date of birth	Position
1	Stefano Tempesti	9 June 1979	goalkeeper
2	Valentino Gallo	17 July 1985	driver
3	Leonardo Binchi	27 August 1975	centre back
4	Niccolo Gitto	12 October 1986	centre back
5	Alex Giorgetti	24 December 1987	driver
6	Maurizio Felugo	4 March 1981	driver
7	Andrea Mangiante	1 July 1976	centre back
8	Christian Presciutti	27 November 1982	driver
9	Fabio Bencivenga	20 January 1976	centre forward
10	Alessandro Calcaterra	26 May 1975	centre forward
11	Leonardo Sottani	1 November 1973	driver
12	Federico Mistrangelo	11 May 1983	driver
13	Fabio Violetti	1 February 1974	goalkeeper

== Macedonia ==
No.	Name	Date of birth	Position
1	Dalibor Percinic	5 May 1976	
2	Igor Milanovic	19 May 1992	
3	Ivan Yuksanovic	26 September 1981	
4	Miroslav Krstovic	17 September 1976	
5	Nebojsa Milic	9 August 1972	
6	Sasko Popovski	21 October 1971	
7	Marko Micic	21 July 1981	
8	Edi Brkic	21 November 1974	
9	Dusan Krstic	11 June 1979	
10	Marko Basic	17 August 1979	
11	Nenad Petrovic	3 May 1977	
12	Danijel Benic	22 April 1977	
13	Milos Vrosevic	8 March 1980	

== Montenegro ==
No.	Name	Date of birth	Position
1	Zdravko Radic	24 June 1979	
2	Drasko Brguljan	27 December 1984	
3	Vjekoslav Paskovic	23 March 1985	
4	Nikola Vukcevic	14 November 1985	
5	Nikola Janovic	22 March 1980	
6	Milan Ticic	14 August 1979	
7	Mladjan Janovic	11 June 1984	
8	Veljko Uskokovic	29 March 1971	
9	Aleksandar Ivovic	24 February 1986	
10	Boris Zlokovic	16 March 1983	
11	Vladimir Gojkovic	29 January 1981	
12	Predrag Jokic		
13	Milos Scepanovic	9 October 1982	
14	Damjan Danilovic	1 April 1982	
15	Aleksandar Radović	24 February 1987	
16	Filip Trajković		

== Romania ==
No.	Name	Date of birth	Position
1	Berttini Nenciu	21 November 1977	
2	Cosmin Radu	9 November 1981	
3	Zoltan Ridzyk	7 June 1979	
4	Alexandru Ghiban	12 October 1986	
5	Andrei Iosep	20 September 1977	
6	Andrei Busila	10 November 1980	
7	Gheorghe Dunca	30 March 1979	
8	Tiberiu Negrean	1 September 1988	
9	Edward Andrei Dina	19 January 1975	
10	Ramiro Georgescu	27 November 1982	
11	Alexandru Matei	31 December 1980	
12	Kalman Kadar	11 June 1979	
13	Robert Dinu	4 January 1974	

== Russia ==
No.	Name	Date of birth	Position
1	Semen Davitashvili	28 August 1987	goalkeeper
2	Pavel Katkov	13 June 1983	centre back
3	Vitaly Yurchik	17 May 1983	centre back
4	Alexey Ryzhof-Alenichev	20 February 1989	driver
5	Yury Zheltovakiy	30 July 1979	driver
6	Sergey Mokienko	18 March 1989	centre back
7	Pavel Khalturin	15 September 1983	centre back
8	Artur Fatakhutdinov	28 February 1984	driver
9	Konstantin Stepanyuk	16 October 1984	driver
10	Viktor Vishnyakov	4 May 1985	driver
11	Alexey Ashaev	22 September 1987	centre forward
12	Alexey Agarkov	6 August 1983	driver
13	Viktor Ivanov	20 April 1984	goalkeeper

== Serbia ==
No.	Name	Date of birth	Position
1	Denis Sefik	20 September 1976	
2	Andrija Prlainovic	28 April 1987	
3	Nikola Radjen	29 January 1985	
4	Vanja Udovičić	12 September 1982	
5	Dejan Savic	24 April 1975	
6	Dusko Pijetlovic	25 April 1985	
7	Slobodan Nikic	25 January 1983	
8	Filip Filipovic	2 May 1987	
9	Aleksandar Ciric	30 December 1977	
10	Aleksandar Sapic	1 June 1978	
11	Vladimir Vujasinovic	14 August 1973	
12	Branko Pekovic	7 May 1979	
13	Slobodan Soro	23 December 1978	

== Slovakia ==
No.	Name	Date of birth	Position
1	Michal Gogola	30 May 1980	
2	Peter Nedbal	23 November 1988	
3	Juraj Zatovic	22 October 1982	
4	Jozef Hrosik	26 March 1981	
5	Andrej Janicek	4 July 1987	
6	Lukas Seman	6 October 1987	
7	Martin Palascak	18 April 1981	
8	Karol Baco	30 May 1978	
9	Miroslav Grutka	10 April 1985	
10	Martin Mravik	4 May 1980	
11	Martin Kolarik	18 March 1986	
12	Michal Kratochvil	4 January 1983	
13	Marek Galis	13 December 1981	

== Spain ==
No.	Name	Date of birth	Position
1	Inaki Aguilar	9 September 1983	
2	Mario Garcia	15 July 1983	
3	David Martin	2 January 1977	
4	Svilen Piralkov	8 April 1975	
5	Guillermo Molina	16 March 1984	
6	Marc Minguel	14 January 1985	
7	Ivan Gallego	13 February 1984	
8	Sergi Mora	5 July 1982	
9	Xavier Valles	4 September 1974	
10	Felipe Perrone	27 February 1986	
11	Ivan Perez	29 June 1979	
12	Xavier Garcia	5 January 1984	
13	Angel Luis Andreo	3 December 1972	
