= Slovakia at the 2000 Summer Olympics =

- IOC code: SVK
- NOC: Slovak Olympic and Sports Committee
- Website: www.olympic.sk (in Slovak)

in Sydney
- Competitors: 114 (87 men and 27 women) in 16 sports
- Flag bearer: Slavomír Kňazovický
- Medals Ranked 39th: Gold 1 Silver 3 Bronze 1 Total 5

Summer Olympics appearances (overview)
- 1996; 2000; 2004; 2008; 2012; 2016; 2020; 2024

Other related appearances
- Hungary (1896–1912); Czechoslovakia (1924–1992)

Slovakia competed at the 2000 Summer Olympics in Sydney, Australia.

== Medalists ==
Medal	Name	Sport	Event	Date
Gold	Pavol Hochschorner; Peter Hochschorner	Canoeing	Men's slalom C-2	September 20
Silver	Martina Moravcová	Swimming	Women's 100 metre butterfly	September 17
Silver	Martina Moravcová	Swimming	Women's 200 metre freestyle	September 19
Silver	Michal Martikán	Canoeing	Men's slalom C-1	September 18
Bronze	Juraj Minčík	Canoeing	Men's slalom C-1	September 18

== Athletics ==
Key

- Note–Ranks given for track events are within the athlete's heat only
- Q = Qualified for the next round
- q = Qualified for the next round as a fastest loser or, in field events, by position without achieving the qualifying target
- NR = National record
- N/A = Round not applicable for the event
- Bye = Athlete not required to compete in round

Men
Track & road events

Athlete	Event	Heat		Quarterfinal		Semifinal		Final	
Athlete	Event	Result	Rank	Result	Rank	Result	Rank	Result	Rank
Štefan Balošák	400 m	46.42	5	did not advance					
Radoslav Holúbek	400 m hurdles	51.18	7	did not advance					
Igor Kollár	20 km walk	—						1:26:31	31
Igor Kováč	110 m hurdles	DNS		did not advance					
Peter Korčok	50 km walk	—						3:58:46	23
Štefan Malík	50 km walk	—						3:56:44	20
Róbert Štefko	Marathon	DNF		did not advance					
Peter Tichý	50 km walk	—						3:54:47	17
Róbert Valíček	20 km walk	—						1:30:46	41
Marián Vanderka	200 m	21.28	6	did not advance					
Štefan Balošák; Radoslav Holúbek; Marcel Lopuchovský; Marián Vanderka	4 × 400 m	03:09.54	27	did not advance					

Field events

Athlete	Event	Qualification		Final	
Athlete	Event	Distance	Position	Distance	Position
Marián Bokor	Javelin throw	75.49	27	did not advance	
Libor Charfreitag	Hammer throw	72.52	30	did not advance	
Milan Haborák	Shot Put	20.00	6 q	19.06	11
Mikuláš Konopka	Shot Put	18.99	23	did not advance	
Mikuláš Konopka	Hammer throw	70.55	32	did not advance	

Women
Track & road events

Athlete	Event	Heat		Quarterfinal		Semifinal		Final	
Athlete	Event	Result	Rank	Result	Rank	Result	Rank	Result	Rank
Zuzana Blažeková	20 km walk	—						1:44:03	43

== Basketball ==
=== Preliminary round ===
Qualified for the quarterfinals

The four best teams from each group advanced to the quarterfinal round.

==== Group A ====
Team	W	L	PF	PA	PD	Pts	Tie
Australia	5	0	394	274	+120	10	
France	4	1	338	287	+51	9	
Brazil	2	3	358	353	+5	7	1.12
Slovakia	2	3	294	282	+12	7	0.97
Canada	2	3	313	317	−4	7	0.91
Senegal	0	5	199	383	−184	5	

16 September
11:30

Brazil	76–60	Slovakia

The Dome, Sydney

18 September
19:30

France	58–51	Slovakia

The Dome, Sydney

20 September
21:30

Australia	70–47	Slovakia

The Dome, Sydney

22 September
11:30

Slovakia	68–56	Canada

The Dome, Sydney

24 September
9:30

Slovakia	68–32	Senegal

The Dome, Sydney

=== Quarterfinals ===
27 September
9:30

United States	58–43	Slovakia

The Dome, Sydney

=== Classification matches ===
29 September
9:30

7th place

Slovakia	64–57	Poland

Sydney Superdome, Sydney

- Team Roster

- Slávka Frniaková
- Martina Godályová
- Renáta Hiráková
- Dagmar Huťková
- Marcela Kalistová
- Anna Kotočová
- Alena Kováčová
- Lívia Libičová
- Jana Lichnerová
- Martina Luptáková
- Katarína Poláková
- Zuzana Žirková

== Canoeing ==
=== Slalom ===
Athlete	Event	Qualifying						Final					
Athlete	Event	Run 1	Rank	Run 2	Rank	Total	Rank	Run 1	Rank	Run 2	Rank	Total	Rank
Peter Hochschorner; Pavol Hochschorner	Men's C-2	132.64	1	136.49	2	269.13	1 Q	121.01	1	116.73	1	237.74	Gold medal
Elena Kaliská	Women's K-1	141.58	1	143.32	2	284.90	1 Q	126.68	5	129.27	5	255.95	4
Michal Martikán	Men's C-1	128.69	1	134.00	5	262.69	1 Q	119.17	5	114.59	1	233.76	Silver medal
Juraj Minčík	Men's C-1	133.88	4	133.28	3	267.16	4 Q	117.55	2	116.87	4	234.22	Bronze medal
Peter Nagy	Men's K-1	129.48	12	132.68	14	262.16	12 Q	117.66	13	116.37	14	234.03	12
Gabriela Stacherová	Women's K-1	148.55	6	146.38	6	294.93	5 Q	134.02	11	134.61	11	268.63	11

=== Sprint ===
Men

Athlete	Event	Heats		Semifinals		Final	
Athlete	Event	Time	Rank	Time	Rank	Time	Rank
Róbert Erban	K-1 500 m	01:43.109	4 QS	01:42.300	6	Did not advance	15
Slavomír Kňazovický	C-1 500 m	01:52.146	3 QF	BYE		02:29.613	5
Rastislav Kužel	K-1 1000 m	03:38.893	3 QS	03:43.203	5	Did not advance	16
Peter Páleš	C-1 1000 m	03:58.036	3 QF	—		04:03.091	9
Jan Kubica; Mario Ostrcil	C-2 500 m	01:47.934	7 QS	01:48.749	8	Did not advance	14
Jan Kubica; Mario Ostrcil	C-2 1000 m	03:40.865	5 QS	03:45.636	5	Did not advance	11
Juraj Bača; Michal Riszdorfer	K-2 500 m	01:32.026	2 QS	01:31.484	4	Did not advance	10
Juraj Bača; Michal Riszdorfer	K-2 1000 m	03:16.854	3 QF	BYE		03:18.325	6
Róbert Erban; Richard Riszdorfer; Juraj Tarr; Erik Vlček	K-4 1000 m	03:00.955	2 QF	BYE		02:57.696	4

Women

Athlete	Event	Heats		Semifinals		Final	
Athlete	Event	Time	Rank	Time	Rank	Time	Rank
Marcela Erbanova	K-1 500 m	01:55.782	6 QS	01:58.472	8	Did not advance	14

Qualification Legend: 'R = Qualify to repechage; QS = Qualify to semi-final; QF = Qualify directly to final

== Cycling ==
=== Road ===
Men

Athlete	Event	Time	Rank
Roman Broniš	Men's road race	dnf	
Milan Dvorščík	Men's road race	5:51:53	87
Martin Riška	Men's road race	5:52:47	90
Róbert Nagy	Men's road race	dnf	

=== Track ===
Men's Sprint

Athlete	Event	Qualifying round		1/16		1/16 repechage		1/8 final		1/8 repechage		Classification 9–12		Quarter-finals		Classification 5–8		Semi-finals		Finals	
Athlete	Event	Time	Rank	Time	Rank	Time	Rank	Time	Rank	Time	Rank	Time	Rank	Time	Rank	Time	Rank	Time	Rank	Time	Rank
Jan Lepka	Men's sprint	10.530; 68.378	10 Q	Eadie (AUS); L	Arrue (USA); Nagatsuka (JPN); L	did not advance															

Men's Keirin

Athlete	Event	First round		First repechage		Second round		Finals	
Athlete	Event	Time	Rank	Time	Rank	Time	Rank	Time	Rank
Jaroslav Jeřábek	Men's Keirin		5		3	did not advance			

Team sprint

Athlete	Event	Qualification		First round		Final	
Athlete	Event	Time Speed (km/h)	Rank	Opposition Time Speed (km/h)	Rank	Opposition Time Speed (km/h)	Rank
Peter Bazálik; Jan Lepka; Jaroslav Jeřábek	Men's team sprint	45.659; 59.134	7 Q	Great Britain; L 45.523; 59.311	6	did not advance	

== Judo ==
Athlete	Event	Round of 32	Round of 16	Quarterfinals	Semifinals	Repechage 1	Repechage 2	Repechage 3	Final / BM	
Athlete	Event	Opposition Result	Opposition Result	Opposition Result	Opposition Result	Opposition Result	Opposition Result	Opposition Result	Opposition Result	Rank
Marek Matuszek	Men's −60 kg	Voskanyan (ARM); W 1001–0010	Ayed (TUR); W 1000–0000	Nomura (JPN); L 0000–1000	—	BYE	Greczkowski (USA); L 0000–1000	did not advance		9

== Football ==
=== Men's team competition ===
Team roster

- (1.) Kamil Čontofalský
- (2.) Marián Čišovský
- (3.) Miroslav Drobňák
- (4.) Peter Hlinka
- (5.) Peter Lérant
- (6.) Miloš Krško
- (7.) Karol Kisel
- (8.) Michal Pančík
- (9.) Juraj Czinege
- (10.) Miroslav Barčík
- (11.) Ján Šlahor
- (12.) Martin Petráš
- (13.) Martin Vyskoč
- (14.) Andrej Šupka
- (15.) Marek Mintál
- (16.) Radoslav Kráľ
- (17.) Andrej Porázik
- (18.) Martin Lipčák
- (20.) Vratislav Greško
- (21.) Tomáš Oravec
- (22.) Ján Mucha

Group D

Team	Pld	W	D	L	GF	GA	GD	Pts
Brazil	3	2	0	1	5	4	+1	6
Japan	3	2	0	1	4	3	+1	6
South Africa	3	1	0	2	5	5	0	3
Slovakia	3	1	0	2	4	6	−2	3

14 September 2000
19:00

Brazil	3–1	Slovakia
Edu 30'; Čišovský 68' (o.g.); Alex 90+1'	Report	Porázik 26'

Brisbane Cricket Ground, Brisbane
Attendance: 24,616
Referee: Simon Micallef (Australia)

17 September 2000
20:00

Slovakia	1–2	Japan
Porázik 83'	Report	Nakata 67'; Inamoto 74'

Bruce Stadium, Canberra
Attendance: 15,289
Referee: Falla N'Doye (Senegal)

20 September 2000
20:00

Slovakia	2–1	South Africa
Czinege 64'; Šlahor 72'	Report	McCarthy 75'

Bruce Stadium, Canberra
Attendance: 14,562
Referee: Mario Sánchez Yantén (Chile)

== Gymnastics ==
=== Artistic ===
Women

Athlete	Event	Qualification						Final					
Athlete	Event	Apparatus				Total	Rank	Apparatus				Total	Rank
Athlete	Event	F	V	UB	BB	Total	Rank	F	V	UB	BB	Total	Rank
Zuzana Sekerová	All-around	8.743	9.087	9.462	7.325	34.617	59	did not advance					

== Rowing ==
Men

Athlete	Event	Heats		Repechage		Semifinals		Final	
Athlete	Event	Time	Rank	Time	Rank	Time	Rank	Time	Rank
Ján Žiška	Single sculls	7:26.21	4 R	7:14.31	2 SA/B	7:26.51	5 FB	7:06.96	10

== Sailing ==
Men

Athlete	Event	Race											Net points	Final rank
Athlete	Event	1	2	3	4	5	6	7	8	9	10	11	Net points	Final rank
Patrik Pollák	Mistral	11	20	~~27~~	26	17	24	25	27	21	17	~~30~~	188	26

M = Medal race; EL = Eliminated – did not advance into the medal race; CAN = Race cancelled

== Shooting ==
Men

Athlete	Event	Qualification		Final	
Athlete	Event	Score	Rank	Score	Rank
Ján Fabo	10 m air pistol	576	17	did not advance	
Ján Fabo	50 m pistol	548	27	did not advance	
Jozef Gönci	50 m rifle three positions	1165	8 Q'	1261.3	8
Jozef Gönci	50 m rifle prone	DNS		did not advance	
Jozef Gönci	10 m air rifle	590	11	did not advance	

Women

Athlete	Event	Qualification		Final	
Athlete	Event	Score	Rank	Score	Rank
Andrea Stranovská	Skeet	67	13	did not advance	

== Swimming ==
Men

Athlete	Event	Heat		Semifinal		Final	
Athlete	Event	Time	Rank	Time	Rank	Time	Rank
Miroslav Machovič	100 m backstroke	56.95	28	did not advance			
Miroslav Machovič	200 m backstroke	2:04.73	31	did not advance			

Women

Athlete	Event	Heat		Semifinal		Final	
Athlete	Event	Time	Rank	Time	Rank	Time	Rank
Jana Korbašová	200 metre backstroke	2:19.37	27	did not advance			
Jana Korbašová	400 metre individual medley	4:59.05	24	did not advance			
Martina Moravcová	50 metre freestyle	25.39	5 Q	25.49	4 Q	25.24	5
Martina Moravcová	100 metre freestyle	55.42	4 Q	55.06	2 Q	54.72	5
Martina Moravcová	200 metre freestyle	2:00.46	8 Q	1:59.75	1 Q	1:58.32	Silver medal
Martina Moravcová	100 metre butterfly	58.95	6 Q	58.49	2 Q	57.97	Silver medal

== Synchronized Swimming ==
Athlete	Event	Technical routine		Free routine (preliminary)			Free routine (final)		
Athlete	Event	Points	Rank	Points	Total (technical + free)	Rank	Points	Total (technical + free)	Rank
Lívia Allárová; Lucia Allárová	Duet	28.187	24	51.826	80.013	24 Q	did not advance		

== Tennis ==
Men

Athlete	Event	Round of 64	Round of 32	Round of 16	Quarterfinals	Semifinals	Final	
Athlete	Event	Opposition Score	Opposition Score	Opposition Score	Opposition Score	Opposition Score	Opposition Score	Rank
Dominik Hrbatý	Singles	Ivan Ljubičić (CRO); L 1–6, 6–1, 3–6	did not advance					
Karol Kučera	Singles	Tim Henman (GBR); L 6–3, 6–2	Roger Federer (SUI); L 4–6, 6–7	did not advance				
Dominik Hrbatý; Karol Kučera	Doubles	BYE	Satoshi Iwabuchi; Thomas Shimada (JPN); W 6–4, 6–3	Massimo Bertolini; Cristian Brandi (ITA); W 6–4, 6–7, 6–3	Todd Woodbridge; Mark Woodforde (AUS); L 6–7, 4–6	did not advance		

Women

Athlete	Event	Round of 64	Round of 32	Round of 16	Quarterfinals	Semifinals	Final	
Athlete	Event	Opposition Score	Opposition Score	Opposition Score	Opposition Score	Opposition Score	Opposition Score	Rank
Karina Habšudová	Singles	Katarina Srebotnik (SLO); W 6–3, 7–6	Conchita Martínez (ESP); W 1–6, 6–0, 6–4	Elena Dementieva (RUS); L 2–6, 1–6	did not advance			
Henrieta Nagyová	Singles	Venus Williams (USA); L 2–6, 2–6	did not advance					
Karina Habšudová; Janette Husárová	Doubles	BYE	Cho Yoon-jeong; Park Sung-hee (KOR); W 7–5, 6–7, 6–4	Els Callens; Dominique Monami (BEL); L 3–6, 2–6	did not advance			

== Water polo ==
=== Preliminary round ===
==== Group A ====
Pos	Team	Pld	W	D	L	GF	GA	GD	Pts	Qualification
1	Russia	5	4	1	0	51	28	+23	9	Quarter Finals
2	Italy	5	4	1	0	43	32	+11	9	Quarter Finals
3	Spain	5	2	1	2	32	34	−2	5	Quarter Finals
4	Australia (H)	5	1	2	2	38	36	+2	4	Quarter Finals
5	Kazakhstan	5	1	1	3	41	46	−5	3	
6	Slovakia	5	0	0	5	30	59	−29	0	

Source: LA84
Rules for classification: 1) Points; 2) Head-to-head points; 3) Head-to-head goal difference; 4) Head-to-head goals scored; 5) Goal difference.
(H) Hosts

23 September 2000; 10:45	Slovakia	8–11	Italy	Ryde Aquatic Leisure Centre; Referees: Boyer (USA), Ludecke (GER)
23 September 2000; 10:45	Score by quarters: 0–3, 2–3, 3–2, 3–3			Ryde Aquatic Leisure Centre; Referees: Boyer (USA), Ludecke (GER)

24 September 2000; 15:45	Spain	7–6	Slovakia	Ryde Aquatic Leisure Centre; Referees: Clemencon (FRA), Janseen (NED)
24 September 2000; 15:45	Score by quarters: 1–3, 2–1, 2–2, 2–0			Ryde Aquatic Leisure Centre; Referees: Clemencon (FRA), Janseen (NED)

25 September 2000; 20:30	Slovakia	6–11	Australia	Ryde Aquatic Leisure Centre; Referees: Bookelman (NED), Boyer (USA)
25 September 2000; 20:30	Score by quarters: 1–4, 1–3, 2–3, 2–1			Ryde Aquatic Leisure Centre; Referees: Bookelman (NED), Boyer (USA)

26 September 2000; 15:45	Kazakhstan	9–5	Slovakia	Ryde Aquatic Leisure Centre; Referees: Rajevic (YUG), Mendendez Betancourt (CUB)
26 September 2000; 15:45	Score by quarters: 4–0, 1–0, 1–2, 3–3			Ryde Aquatic Leisure Centre; Referees: Rajevic (YUG), Mendendez Betancourt (CUB)

27 September 2000; 10:45	Slovakia	5–21	Russia	Ryde Aquatic Leisure Centre; Referees: Klaric (CRO), Janseen van de Laak (NED)
27 September 2000; 10:45	Score by quarters: 1–7, 1–5, 1–6, 2–3			Ryde Aquatic Leisure Centre; Referees: Klaric (CRO), Janseen van de Laak (NED)

=== Classification 9th–12th ===
Team	Pld	W	L	D	GF	GA	GD	Pts
Kazakhstan	3	2	0	1	23	18	+5	5
Greece	3	1	0	2	24	20	+4	4
Netherlands	3	1	1	1	19	20	−1	3
Slovakia	3	0	3	0	24	32	−8	0

29 September 2000; 10:45	Slovakia	8–9	Netherlands	Ryde Aquatic Leisure Centre; Referees: Bower (AUS), Moradi Shahpar (IRI)
29 September 2000; 10:45	Score by quarters: 1–1, 2–2, 3–4, 2–2			Ryde Aquatic Leisure Centre; Referees: Bower (AUS), Moradi Shahpar (IRI)

30 September 2000; 10:00	Kazakhstan	11–8	Slovakia	Ryde Aquatic Leisure Centre; Referees: Boyer (USA), Melliar (RSA)
30 September 2000; 10:00	Score by quarters: 4–1, 3–1, 2–2, 2–4			Ryde Aquatic Leisure Centre; Referees: Boyer (USA), Melliar (RSA)

1 October 2000; 9:00	Slovakia	8–12	Greece	Ryde Aquatic Leisure Centre; Referees: Takata (USA), Moradi Shahpar (IRI)
1 October 2000; 9:00	Score by quarters: 2–3, 4–3, 1–1, 1–5			Ryde Aquatic Leisure Centre; Referees: Takata (USA), Moradi Shahpar (IRI)

- Team Roster

- Karol Bačo
- Milan Cipov
- Štefan Gergely
- Michal Gogola
- Gejza Gyurcsi
- Jozef Hrošík
- Sergej Charin
- Róbert Kaid
- Alexander Nagy
- Peter Nižný
- Peter Veszelits
- Juraj Zaťovič
- Martin Mravík

== Weightlifting ==
Women

Athlete	Event	Snatch		Clean & Jerk		Total	Rank
Athlete	Event	Result	Rank	Result	Rank	Total	Rank
Dagmar Daneková	−58 kg	82.5	11	105.0	9	187.5	9

== Wrestling ==
Men's freestyle

Athlete	Event	Elimination Pool				Quarterfinal	Semifinal	Final / BM	
Athlete	Event	Opposition Result	Opposition Result	Opposition Result	Rank	Opposition Result	Opposition Result	Opposition Result	Rank
Andrej Fašánek	−58 kg	Ri Yong-sam (PRK); L 1–5	David Pogosian (GEO); L 1–5	—	3	did not advance			16
Štefan Fernyák	−63 kg	Shamil Afandiyev (AZE); L 1–6	Jang Jae-sung (KOR); L 3–13	Musa Ilhan (AUS); W 4–0	3	did not advance			8
Radion Kertanti	−76 kg	Nasir Gadzhikhanov (MKD); W 2–3	Alexander Leipold (GER); W 0–5	Yosmany Romero (CUB); W 2–3	4	did not advance			15
Peter Pecha	−130 kg	Sven Thiele (GER); L 0–10	David Musulbes (RUS); L 0–4	—	3	did not advance			16
