= Water polo at the 2001 World Aquatics Championships – Men's team rosters =

This is a list of the squads which participated at the 2001 FINA Men's World Water Polo Championship.

== Hungary ==
The following is the Hungarian roster.

- 1. Kósz
- 2. Székely
- 3. Varga
- 4. Varga
- 5. Kásás
- 6. Vári
- 7. Kiss
- 8. Benedek
- 9. Fodor
- 10. Szécsi
- 11. Steinmetz
- 12. Molnár
- 13. Biros
- Head coach: Kemény

== Italy ==
The following is the Italian roster.

- 1. Tempesti
- 2. Postiglione
- 3. Binchi
- 4. Buonocore
- 5. Rath
- 6. R. Calcaterra
- 7. Mistrangelo
- 8. Angelini
- 9. Felugo
- 10. A. Calcaterra
- 11. Di Costanzo
- 12. Silipo
- 13. Violetti
- Head coach: Campagna

== Yugoslavia ==
The following is the Yugoslavian roster.

- 1. Šoštar
- 2. Trbojević
- 3. Šefik
- 4. Zimonjić
- 5. Savić
- 6. Ikodinović
- 7. Jelenić
- 8. Uskoković
- 9. Ćirić
- 10. Šapić
- 11. Vujasinović
- 12. Vukanić
- 13. Peković
- Head coach: Manojlović
