= Mackeben =

Mackeben is a surname. Notable people with the surname include:

- Sören Mackeben (born 1979), German water polo player
- Theo Mackeben (1897–1953), German pianist, conductor and composer
