= Denis Zhivchikov =

Kazakhstani water polo player

Personal information
- Nationality: Kazakhstani
- Born: 1 July 1976 (age 49) Russian SFSR, Soviet Union

Sport
- Sport: Water polo

Denis Zhivchikov (Денис Евгеньевич Живчиков, born 1 July 1976) is a Kazakhstani water polo player. He competed in the men's tournament at the 2000 Summer Olympics.
