= Antonio Vittorioso =

Italian water polo player

Personal information
- Nationality: Italian
- Born: 9 January 1973 (age 52); Rome, Italy

Sport
- Sport: Water polo

Antonio Vittorioso (born 9 January 1973) is an Italian water polo player. He competed in the men's tournament at the 2000 Summer Olympics.
