= Florin Bonca =

Romanian water polo player

Personal information
- Born: May 2, 1971 (age 53); Șimleu Silvaniei, Romania

Sport
- Sport: Water polo

Florin Bonca (born 2 May 1971) is a Romanian former water polo player who competed in the 1996 Summer Olympics.
