= Višeslav Sarić =

Croatian water polo player

Personal information
- Nationality: Croatian
- Born: 3 February 1977 (age 48); Split, Yugoslavia

Sport
- Sport: Water polo

Višeslav Sarić (born 3 February 1977) is a Croatian water polo player. He competed in the men's tournament at the 2000 Summer Olympics.
