= Dimitrios Miteloudis =

Greek water polo player

Personal information
- Born: 11 February 1982 (age 43); Thessaloniki, Greece

Sport
- Sport: Water polo

Dimitrios Miteloudis (born 11 February 1982) is a Greek water polo player who competed in the 2008 Summer Olympics.
