= Chris Humbert =

American water polo player (born 1969)

Personal information
- Full name: Christopher A. Humbert
- Born: December 27, 1969 (age 56) Modesto, California, U.S.
- Height: 200 cm (6 ft 7 in)
- Weight: 102 kg (225 lb)
- Spouse: Annita Nathanail (m. 2001)

Sport
- Country: United States
- Sport: Water polo
- Position: Center Forward (WP)
- College team: University of California Berkeley
- Coached by: Steve Heaston (UC Berkeley); Bill Barnett (1992 Olympics); Richard Corso (1996 Olympics); John Vargas (2000 Olympics)
Medal record
Men's water polo
Representing the United States
FINA World Cup
| Gold medal – first place | 1991 Barcelona | Team |
| Gold medal – first place | 1997 Athens | Team |
Pan American Games
| Gold medal – first place | 1995 Mar del Plata | Team |
| Silver medal – second place | 1991 Havana | Team |

Christopher A. Humbert (born December 27, 1969, in Modesto, California) is a former water polo center forward from the United States, who competed for the University of California Berkeley, and participated with the US water polo team at three Summer Olympics (1992, 1996 and 2000).

Humbert was born December 27, 1969, in Modesto, California. He attended Lodi High School where he played both basketball and varsity water polo. After tranferring as an upperclassman, he played water polo and swam competitively for Tokay High School under Coach Courtney Porter graduating in 1988.

== University of California Berkeley ==
Enrolling in 1988, Humbert played collegiate water polo for the University of California Berkeley on scholarship under head varsity water polo coach Steve Heaston, where he graduated in 1992 with a Bachelor of Arts in History. While at Cal, Humbert received All-America honors in four successive years, and was highly instrumental in leading the team to NCAA national championships in 1988, 1990 and 1991. As a both a Junior and Senior, he was a player of the year for the NCAA. As a strong and fast left-handed player, Humbert assumed the role of 2-meter center, and became a frequent scorer for the team.

Despite his youth, Humbert was the US National team's top scorer at both the 1990 Goodwill Games and the French International Championship in 1991.

== 1992 Barcelona Olympics ==
Humbert participated with the U.S. men's water polo team in the August, 1992 Barcelona Olympics under Head Coach Bill Barnett, a former player for Long Beach State, where the U.S. team placed fourth, with Italy taking the gold, Spain taking the silver, and the Unified team taking the bronze. At 22, Humbert was the youngest member of the team.

== 1996 Atlanta Olympics ==
Barnhart participated in the 1996 Summer Olympics in Atlanta, Georgia, under Olympic water polo Head Coach Richard Corso, for the American team that placed seventh overall in competition. Other former U. Cal Berkeley water polo players on the team included Gavin Arroyo, and Chris Oeding. The team from Spain took the gold medal, Croatia took the silver, and Italy took the bronze.

== 2000 Sydney Olympics ==
Humbert participated with the US Men's Olympic water polo team for the third time at the 2000 Sydney Olympics under Olympic Coach John Vargas. He was part of the US team that completed the Olympics with an overall sixth-place finish among twelve competing countries. In preliminary rounds, the US team defeated the Netherlands and Croatia, both traditionally strong teams, but lost their last match in the final round 10–8 to Italy. Humbert scored four crucial goals in the U.S. 12-8 win over the team from the Netherlands. He scored two goals in the game in the close 10-7 opening round loss to the team from Croatia.

Perennial pre-game favorite Hungary took the gold medal, Russia took the silver, and the historically dominant team from Yugoslavia took the bronze, having had more total goals than the United States. Hungary easily defeated rival Russia in the final game by a score of 13-6, leading in each of the first three periods by a score of 3-1, 8-2, and 10-4 respectively.

In 2001, while playing Greek professional water polo, Humbert married Annita Nathanail, a Greek actress. The couple had two daughters by 2008.

=== International competition ===
Humbert competed with the U.S. National team from 1989-2000., and was on the United States national team squads that won the gold medal in the 1991 FINA World Cup in Barcelona and the gold medal in the 1997 FINA World Cup in Athens. He was part of the US National team that won a silver medal at the Pan American games in 1991 in La Habana, Cuba. He won a Pan American gold medal in 1995 at Mar del Plata, near Buenos Aires, Argentina and a second Pan American gold medal at the Pan American games in 1999 in Winnipeg, Ontario, Canada.

=== Professional play ===
In professional water polo, he played overseas in Italy and Greece. From 1992 to 1994 he played for Italian giant Posillipo, with whom he won 2 Italian Championships. In 1999–2000, he helped Ethnikos Piraeus win the Greek Cup. In the 2002–03 season, he played for Greek powerhouse Olympiacos, with whom he won the LEN Super Cup, the Greek Championship and the Greek Cup.

Humbert did some work as an actor, appearing a few times as an extra on the television program Baywatch.

=== Honors ===
In 2018, he was inducted into the USA Water Polo Hall of Fame, and in 2001 had been formerly inducted into the University of California Athletics Hall of Fame.

== See also ==
- List of men's Olympic water polo tournament top goalscorers
