= Liviu Răducanu =

Romanian water polo player

Personal information
- Nationality: Romanian
- Born: 25 May 1954 (age 70); Bucharest, Romania

Sport
- Sport: Water polo

Liviu Răducanu (born 25 May 1954) is a Romanian water polo player. He competed at the 1976 Summer Olympics and the 1980 Summer Olympics.
