= Edward Andrei =

Romanian water polo player

Personal information
- Born: 19 January 1975 (age 50); Bucharest, Romania

Sport
- Sport: Water polo

Edward Andrei (born 19 January 1975) is a Romanian former water polo player who competed in the 1996 Summer Olympics.
