= Vincent de Nardi =

French water polo player (born 1967)

Personal information
- Nationality: French
- Born: 17 May 1967 (age 58); Sète, France

Sport
- Sport: Water polo

Vincent de Nardi (born 17 May 1967) is a French water polo player. He competed in the men's tournament at the 1992 Summer Olympics.
