= Water polo at the 2003 World Aquatics Championships – Men's tournament =

Tournament details
- Venue(s): Spain (in Barcelona host cities)
- Dates: 14 – 26 July
- Teams: 16 (from 4 confederations)

Final positions
- Champions: Hungary (2nd title)
- Runner-up: Italy
- Third place: Serbia and Montenegro
- Fourth place: Greece

Tournament statistics
- Matches played: 48
- Goals scored: 659 (13.73 per match)
- Top scorer(s): (Serbia and Montenegro) Aleksandar Šapić

Awards
- Best player: (Italy) Roberto Calcaterra

The 2003 Men's World Water Polo Championship was the tenth edition of the men's water polo tournament at the World Aquatics Championships, organised by the world governing body in aquatics, the FINA. The tournament was held from 14 to 26 July 2003, and was incorporated into the 2003 World Aquatics Championships in Barcelona, Spain.

== Participating teams ==
Americas	Asia	Europe	Oceania
Brazil; Canada; United States	China; Japan	Croatia; Germany; Greece; Hungary; Italy; Romania; Russia; Serbia and Montenegro; Slovakia; Spain	Australia

=== Groups formed ===
Group A

- Canada
- Croatia
- Hungary
- Romania

Group B

- Australia
- Japan
- Serbia and Montenegro
- United States

Group C

- China
- Germany
- Greece
- Italy

Group D

- Brazil
- Russia
- Slovakia
- Spain

== Preliminary round ==
Qualified for the quarterfinals
Qualified for the playoff round
Will play for places 13–16

=== Group A ===
Pos	Team	Pts	Pld	W	D	L	GF	GA	GD
1	Hungary	5	3	2	1	0	29	15	+14
2	Croatia	5	3	2	1	0	32	19	+13
3	Romania	2	3	1	0	2	24	24	0
4	Canada	0	3	0	0	3	9	36	−27

- July 14, 2003

Canada	3 – 10	Romania
Croatia	7 – 7	Hungary

- July 16, 2003

Hungary	9 – 5	Romania
Canada	3 – 13	Croatia

- July 18, 2003

Canada	3 – 13	Hungary
Croatia	12 – 9	Romania

=== Group B ===
Pos	Team	Pts	Pld	W	D	L	GF	GA	GD
1	United States	5	3	2	1	0	32	16	+16
2	Serbia and Montenegro	5	3	2	1	0	27	18	+9
3	Australia	2	3	1	0	2	23	22	+1
4	Japan	0	3	0	0	3	13	39	−26

- July 14, 2003

Australia	10 – 2	Japan
Serbia and Montenegro	5 – 5	United States

- July 16, 2003

United States	14 – 4	Japan
Australia	6 – 7	Serbia and Montenegro

- July 18, 2003

Australia	7 – 13	United States
Serbia and Montenegro	15 – 7	Japan

=== Group C ===
Pos	Team	Pts	Pld	W	D	L	GF	GA	GD
1	Italy	6	3	3	0	0	36	17	+19
2	Germany	4	3	2	0	1	27	22	+5
3	Greece	2	3	1	0	2	29	21	+8
4	China	0	3	0	0	3	10	42	−32

- July 14, 2003

China	4 – 15	Italy
Greece	7 – 9	Germany

- July 16, 2003

Germany	8 – 11	Italy
China	2 – 17	Greece

- July 18, 2003

China	4 – 10	Germany
Greece	5 – 10	Italy

=== Group D ===
Pos	Team	Pts	Pld	W	D	L	GF	GA	GD
1	Spain	6	3	3	0	0	30	16	+14
2	Russia	4	3	2	0	1	26	18	+8
3	Slovakia	2	3	1	0	2	17	22	−5
4	Brazil	0	3	0	0	3	10	27	−17

- July 14, 2003

Russia	8 – 5	Slovakia
Spain	10 – 3	Brazil

- July 16, 2003

Slovakia	7 – 4	Brazil
Spain	10 – 8	Russia

- July 18, 2003

Russia	10 – 3	Brazil
Spain	10 – 5	Slovakia

== Playoff round ==
- July 20, 2003

Croatia	6 – 10	Australia
Romania	3 – 11	Serbia and Montenegro
Germany	6 – 7	Slovakia
Greece	15 – 14	Russia

== Final round ==
Quarter-finals
July 22 – Barcelona
Hungary	13
Slovakia	5
July 22 – Barcelona
Greece	4
United States	2
July 22 – Barcelona
Italy	7
Australia	3
July 22 – Barcelona
Serbia and M.	7
Spain	3

Semi-finals
July 24 – Barcelona
Hungary	9
Greece	8
July 24 – Barcelona
Italy	6
Serbia and M.	5

Final
July 26 – Barcelona
Hungary	11
Italy	9
Third place
July 26 – Barcelona
Greece	3
Serbia and M.	5

=== Quarter finals ===
- July 22, 2003

Hungary	13 – 5	Slovakia
United States	2 – 4	Greece
Spain	3 – 7	Serbia and Montenegro
Italy	7 – 3	Australia

=== Semi finals ===
- July 24, 2003

Hungary	9 – 8	Greece
Serbia and Montenegro	5 – 6	Italy

=== Finals ===
- July 26, 2003 — Bronze Medal Match

Greece	3 – 5	Serbia and Montenegro

- July 26, 2003 — Gold Medal Match

Hungary	11 – 9	Italy

=== 13th-16th place ===
13th - 16th place
2003-07-20 – Barcelona
Canada	6
Japan	1
2003-07-20 – Barcelona
Brazil	8
China	6

13th place
2003-07-22 – Barcelona
Canada	5
Brazil	6
15th place
2003-07-22 – Barcelona
Japan	10
China	9

- July 20, 2003

Canada	6 – 1	Japan
Brazil	8 – 6	China

- July 22, 2003

Japan	10 – 9	China
Brazil	6 – 5	Canada

=== 9th-12th place ===
9th - 12th place
2003-07-22 – Barcelona
Croatia	7
Germany	3
2003-07-22 – Barcelona
Russia	9
Romania	6

9th place
2003-07-24 – Barcelona
Croatia	8
Russia	2
11th place
2003-07-24 – Barcelona
Germany	7
Romania	6

- July 22, 2003

Croatia	7 – 3	Germany
Russia	9 – 6	Romania

- July 24, 2003

Germany	7 – 6	Romania
Croatia	8 – 3	Russia

=== 5th-8th place ===
5th - 8th place
2003-07-24 – Barcelona
United States	11
Slovakia	5
2003-07-24 – Barcelona
Spain	10
Australia	8

5th place
2003-07-26 – Barcelona
United States	7
Spain	9
7th place
2003-07-26 – Barcelona
Slovakia	8
Australia	11

- July 24, 2003

United States	11 – 5	Slovakia
Spain	10 – 8	Australia

- July 26, 2003

Slovakia	8 – 11	Australia
United States	7 – 9	Spain

== Final ranking ==
Rank	Team
	Hungary
	Italy
	Serbia and Montenegro
4.	Greece
5.	Spain
6.	United States
7.	Australia
8.	Slovakia
9.	Croatia
10.	Russia
11.	Germany
12.	Romania
13.	Brazil
14.	Canada
15.	Japan
16.	China

2003 FINA Men's World champions

Hungary
Second title

Team Roster

Tibor Benedek, Péter Biros, Rajmund Fodor, István Gergely, Tamás Kásás, Gergely Kiss, Norbert Madaras, Tamás Molnár, Barnabás Steinmetz, Zoltán Szécsi, Tamás Varga, Zsolt Varga, Attila Vári
Head coach: Dénes Kemény

== Medalists ==
Gold	Silver	Bronze
Hungary Tibor Benedek (c); Péter Biros; Rajmund Fodor; István Gergely; Tamás Kásás; Gergely Kiss; Norbert Madaras; Tamás Molnár; Barnabás Steinmetz; Zoltán Szécsi; Tamás Varga; Zsolt Varga; Attila Vári Head coach Dénes Kemény	Italy Alberto Angelini; Fabio Bencivenga; Fabrizio Buonocore; Alessandro Calcaterra; Roberto Calcaterra; Maurizio Felugo; Goran Fiorentini; Marco Gerini; Andrea Mangiante; Francesco Postiglione; Bogdan Rath; Carlo Silipo (c); Stefano Tempesti Head coach Paolo de Crescenzo	Serbia and Montenegro Aleksandar Ćirić; Vladimir Gojković; Danilo Ikodinović; Viktor Jelenić; Predrag Jokić; Nikola Kuljača; Slobodan Nikić; Aleksandar Šapić; Dejan Savić; Denis Šefik; Vanja Udovičić; Vladimir Vujasinović (c); Boris Zloković Head coach Nenad Manojlović

== Individual awards ==
- Most Valuable Player

- Roberto Calcaterra (ITA)

- Best Goalkeeper

- Denis Sefik (SCG)

- Topscorer

- Aleksandar Sapic (SCG)
