= Ivo Ivaniš =

Croatian water polo player (1976–2003)

Personal information
- Nationality: Croatian
- Born: 14 February 1976 Cavtat, Yugoslavia
- Died: 16 August 2003 (aged 27) Bobara Island, Croatia

Sport
- Sport: Water polo
Medal record
Representing Croatia
European Championships
Silver medal – second place	1999 Florence	Team competition
Silver medal – second place	2003 Kranj	Team competition
Mediterranean Games
Silver medal – second place	1997 Bari	Team competition

Ivo Ivaniš (14 February 1976 – 16 August 2003) was a Croatian water polo player. He competed in the men's tournament at the 2000 Summer Olympics. He died in a tragic diving accident off an island in Croatia.
