= Jens Pohlmann =

German water polo player (born 1978)

Personal information
- Nationality: Germany
- Born: 30 October 1978 (age 47) Berlin
- Height: 1.80 m (5 ft 11 in)
- Weight: 93 kg (205 lb)

Sport
- Sport: Water polo
- Position: driver

Senior clubs
- Years: Team
- ?-?: Wasserfreunde Spandau 04
National team
- Years: Team
- ?-?: Germany

Jens Pohlmann (born 30 October 1978) is a German male water polo player. He was a member of the Germany men's national water polo team, playing as a driver. He was a part of the team at the 2004 Summer Olympics. On club level he played for Wasserfreunde Spandau 04 in Germany.
