= Ryde Aquatic Leisure Centre =

Sports venue in Ryde, New South Wales, Australia

Coordinates: 33.82168°S 151.11896°E

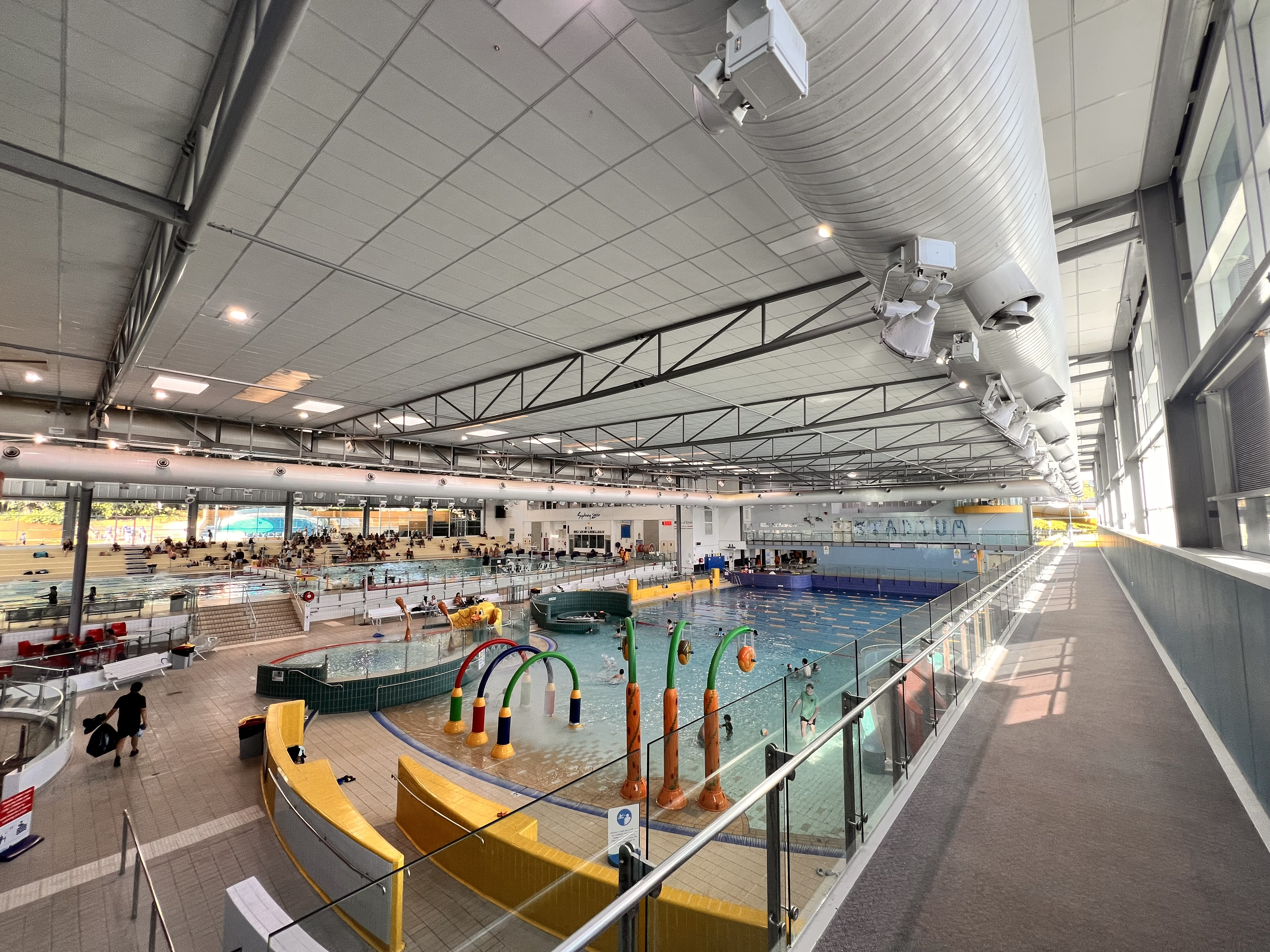
Interior view of the Ryde Aquatic Leisure Centre.

The Ryde Aquatic Leisure Centre is an aquatics venue located in Ryde, New South Wales, Australia. The original venue was demolished in November 1998 with rebuilding commencing in April 1999. Rebuilding was completed in April 2000 with opening in May 2000. During the 2000 Summer Olympics, it hosted the water polo preliminaries and the women's semifinals.
