= Alexander Nagy =

Slovak water polo player (born 1974)

Personal information
- Nationality: Slovak
- Born: 8 May 1974 (age 51); Košice, Czechoslovakia

Sport
- Sport: Water polo

Alexander Nagy (born 8 May 1974) is a Slovak water polo player. He competed in the men's tournament at the 2000 Summer Olympics.
