= Javier Sánchez (water polo) =

Spanish water polo player (born 1975)

Personal information
- Full name: Javier Sánchez Toril del Pino
- Nationality: Spain
- Born: 16 June 1975 (age 51) Madrid, Spain
- Height: 1.93 m (6 ft 4 in)
- Weight: 85 kg (187 lb)

Sport
- Sport: Water polo
- Position: centre forward

Senior clubs
- Years: Team
- ?-?: CN Atlètic-Barceloneta
National team
- Years: Team
- ?-?: Spain
Medal record
Representing Spain
World Championships
Gold medal – first place	2001 Fukuoka	Team competition
Mediterranean Games
Bronze medal – third place	1997 Bari	Team competition

Javier Sánchez Toril del Pino (born 16 June 1975) is a Spanish water polo player and bronze medalist at the 1997 Mediterranean Games. He was a member of the Spain men's national water polo team, playing as a centre forward. He was a part of the team at the 2000 Summer Olympics and 2004 Summer Olympics. On club level he played for CN Atlètic-Barceloneta in Spain.

== See also ==
- List of world champions in men's water polo
- List of World Aquatics Championships medalists in water polo
