= Robert Dinu =

Romanian water polo player

Personal information
- Born: January 4, 1974 (age 51); Bucharest, Romania

Sport
- Sport: Water polo

Robert Dinu (born 4 January 1974) is a Romanian former water polo player who competed in the 1996 Summer Olympics.

== See also ==
- Romania men's Olympic water polo team records and statistics
- List of men's Olympic water polo tournament goalkeepers
