= Sergej Charin =

Slovak water polo player (17 November 1963 – 2 September 2011)

Personal information
- Nationality: Slovak
- Born: 17 November 1963 (age 62) Lviv, Ukrainian SSR, Soviet Union
- Died: 2 September 2011

Sport
- Sport: Water polo

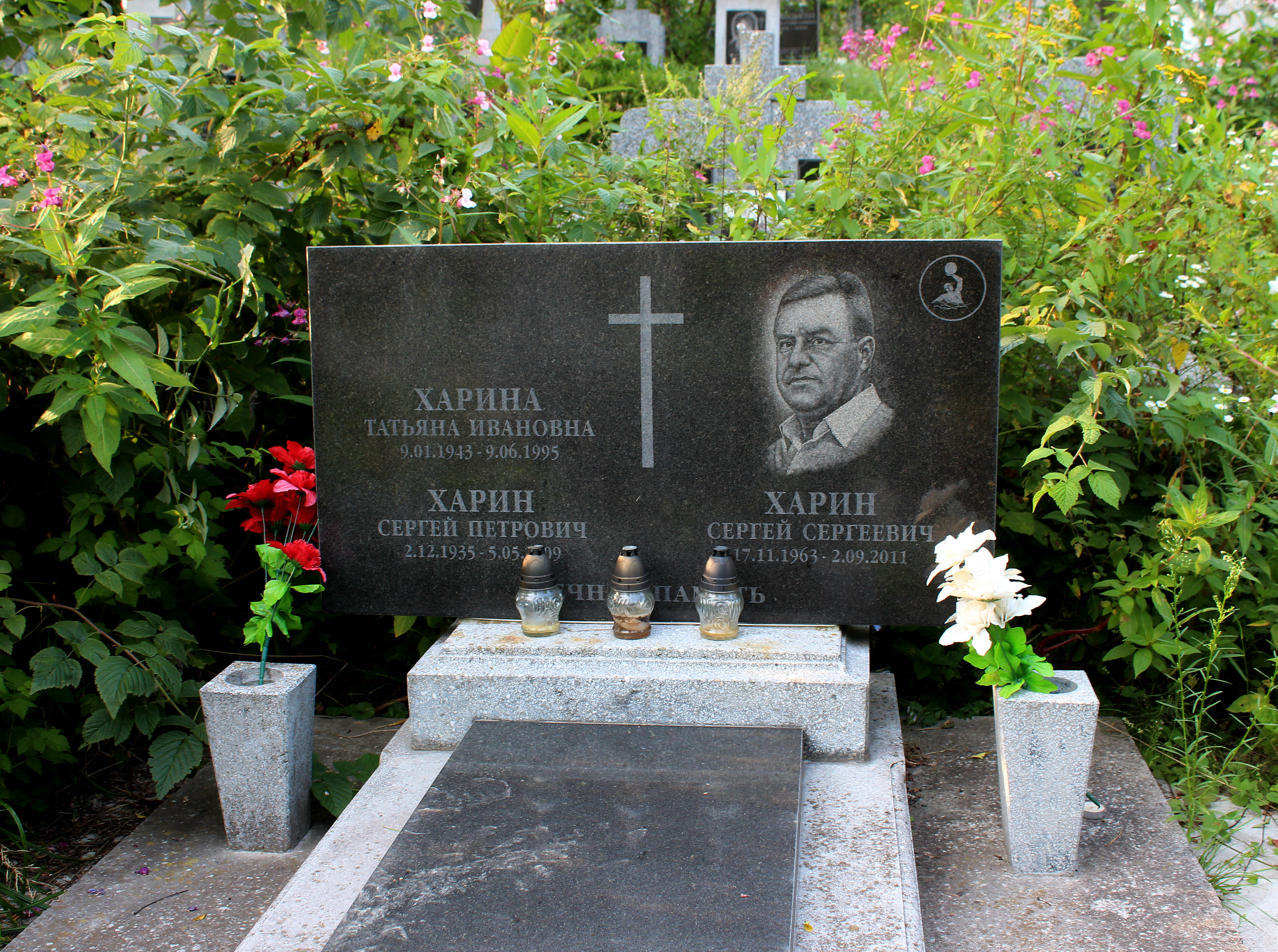
The tombstone on the grave of the Kharin family. M. Lviv, Holoskivskyi cemetery, field No. 6 a.

Sergej Charin (17 November 1963 – 2 September 2011) was a Slovak water polo player. He competed in the men's tournament at the 2000 Summer Olympics.
