= Goran Fiorentini =

Croatian-Italian water polo player

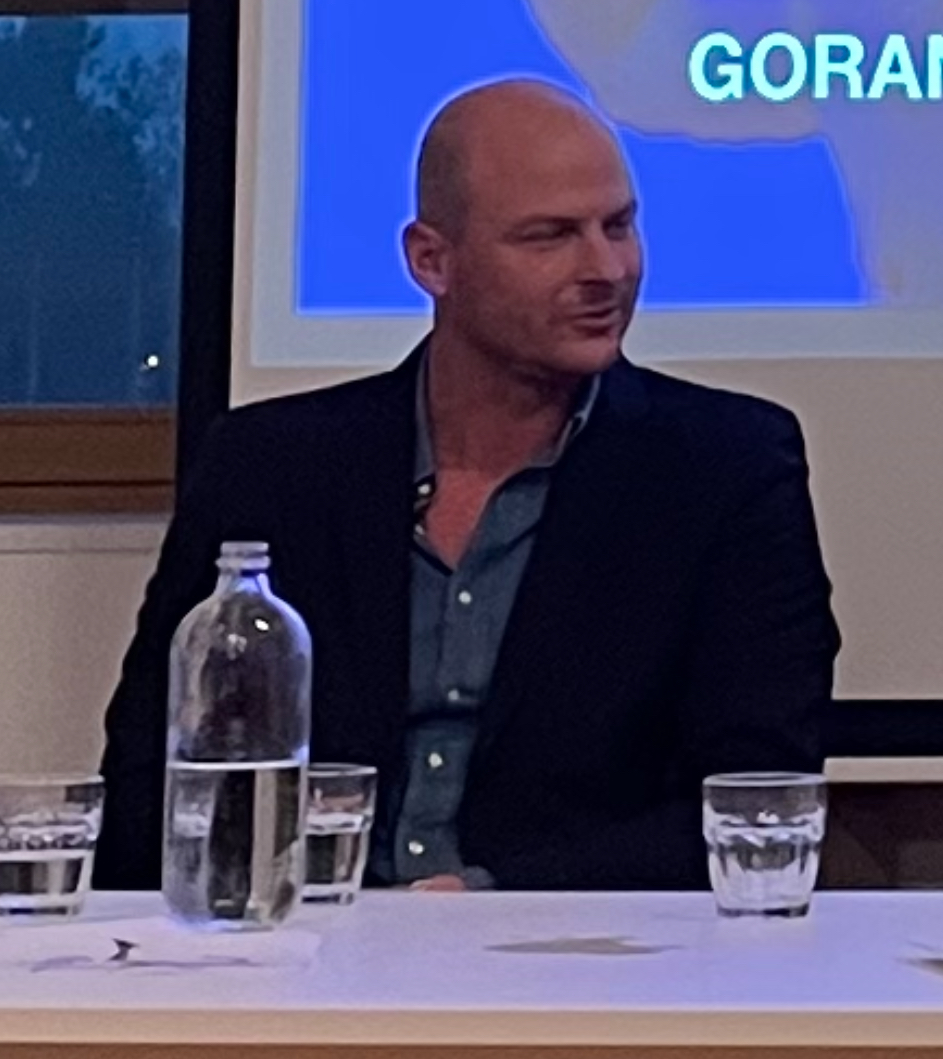

Personal information
- Born: 21 November 1981 (age 44) Split, Yugoslavia

Sport
- Sport: Water polo
Medal record
Representing Italy
World Championships
Silver medal – second place	2003 Barcelona	Team competition

Goran Fiorentini (born 21 November 1981) is a Croatian-Italian former water polo player who competed in the 2004 Summer Olympics. He is the elder brother of Deni Fiorentini and son of Yugoslavia player Branko Jovanović. Like his brother he holds dual Croatian-Italian citizenship.

== See also ==
- Italy men's Olympic water polo team records and statistics
- List of World Aquatics Championships medalists in water polo
