= Andrea Mangiante =

Italian water polo player

Personal information
- Born: 1 July 1976 (age 49) Chiavari, Italy

Sport
- Sport: Water polo
Medal record
Representing Italy
World Championships
Silver medal – second place	2003 Barcelona	Team competition

Andrea Mangiante (born 1 July 1976) is an Italian water polo player who competed in the 2008 Summer Olympics.

== See also ==
- List of World Aquatics Championships medalists in water polo
