= Nikola Kuljača =

Serbian water polo player

Medal record

Men's water polo

Representing Yugoslavia and Serbia and Montenegro

Olympic Games
Silver medal – second place	2004 Athens	
Bronze medal – third place	2000 Sydney	

World Championships
Bronze medal – third place	2003 Barcelona	

FINA World Cup
Bronze medal – third place	2002 Belgrade	

Mediterranean Games
Gold medal – first place	1997 Bari	

Nikola Kuljača (born 16 August 1974 in Belgrade, Serbia, SFR Yugoslavia) is a Serbian water polo goalkeeper who played for the team of Federal Republic of Yugoslavia/Serbia and Montenegro on the bronze medal squad at the 2000 Summer Olympics and the silver medal squad at the 2004 Summer Olympics.

== See also ==
- Serbia and Montenegro men's Olympic water polo team records and statistics
- List of Olympic medalists in water polo (men)
- List of men's Olympic water polo tournament goalkeepers
- List of World Aquatics Championships medalists in water polo
