= Konstantinos Loudis =

Greek water polo player

Personal information
- Born: March 24, 1969 (age 55); Thessaloniki, Greece

Sport
- Sport: Water polo

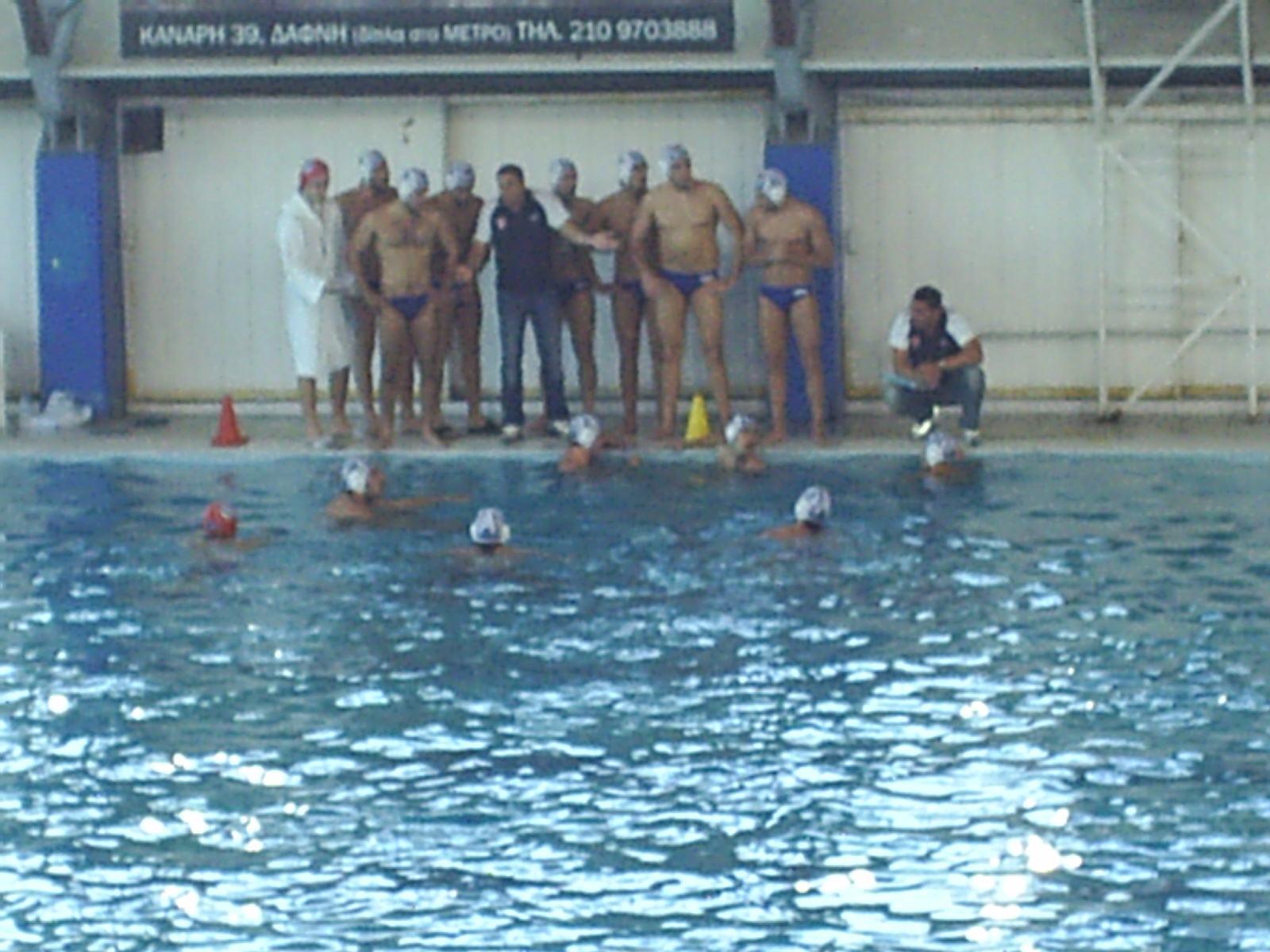
Panionios Athens water polo players gathered with their couch Kostas Loudis

Konstantinos Loudis (born 24 March 1969) is a former Greek water polo player and coach. He competed in the 1992 Summer Olympics, the 1996 Summer Olympics, the 2000 Summer Olympics, and the 2004 Summer Olympics.

== See also ==
- Greece men's Olympic water polo team records and statistics
- List of players who have appeared in multiple men's Olympic water polo tournaments
