= Revaz Chomakhidze =

Georgian water polo player

Personal information
- Nationality: Georgian
- Born: 15 December 1973 (age 52) Moscow, Russian SFSR, Soviet Union
- Height: 6 ft 5 in (1.96 m)
- Weight: 223 lb (101 kg)

Sport
- Sport: Water polo
Medal record
Men's water polo
Representing Russia
Olympic Games
Silver medal – second place	2000 Sydney	Team
Bronze medal – third place	2004 Athens	Team

Revaz Baadurovich Chomakhidze (Note: Also spelled Tchomakhidze.) (Note: Russian: Реваз Баадурович Чомахидзе; Georgian: რევაზ ჩომახიძე) (born 15 December 1973) is a Russo-Georgian water polo player who played on the silver medal squad at the 2000 Summer Olympics and the bronze medal squad at the 2004 Summer Olympics.

== Career ==
Tchomakhidze began his water polo career in Tbilisi, Georgian SSR (Soviet Union), at the sports club Dinamo, where he played from 1987 to 1993. His first coach was Vladimir Kutateladze. He studied at Tbilisi State University and later attended the Diplomatic Academy. In 2002, he was awarded the title of Master of Sport in water polo.

In 1993, Tchomakhidze began his professional career abroad, joining the Italian club Rari Nantes Florentia, where he played until 1997. He then returned to Russia to play for WPC Dynamo Moscow from 1997 to 2000, during which time he also studied economics at Moscow State University under a special contract arrangement. In 1997, he was selected for the Russian national team, and in 1998 he competed at the Goodwill Games.

In 2000, Tchomakhidze returned to Italy to play for Pro Recco, where he remained for the 2000–2001 season. He subsequently joined Mladost Zagreb in Croatia, playing there for three seasons. Under head coach Ozren Bonačić, he won the Croatian Championship twice. A notable achievement during this period was scoring the winning goal in the final of the 2002 FINA Cup against Hungary.

At the 2004 Summer Olympics in Athens, Tchomakhidze played a key role in Russia’s bronze-medal match, scoring four goals in a 6–5 victory over Greece.

Following his time abroad, Tchomakhidze returned to Russia and joined Sturm 2002 Chekhov, a club based near Moscow, where he is still regarded as one of the best players. He remained a member of the Russian national team during this period. In an interview with Novaya Izvestiya, he stated, “I will not be modest—I am the best player in Europe.”

In February 2007, one month before the World Championships in Melbourne, Australia, Tchomakhidze announced his withdrawal from the national team, citing fatigue and the need for rest. Although he was invited to the Olympic qualification tournament in March 2008, he again declined participation. That same year, he won the LEN Trophy with Sturm 2002 Chekhov, marking the club’s first international title.

Chomakhidze played for Chekhov until the summer of 2009. After returning to Georgia, he represented the national team at the B-European Championship in Lugano, helping secure qualification. He subsequently became involved in coaching, taking on a role as a youth coach within the Georgian Water Polo Federation. One of his early successes was leading the Georgian youth team to qualification for the 2010 European Youth Championship in Stuttgart.

Since 2022, Chomakhidze has served as head coach of Sintez Kazan.

== Achievements ==
- 1989: European Youth Championship Istanbul/Turkey, 5. Place
- 1997: European Championship Sevilla/Spain, 3. Place
- 1998: Goodwill Games
- 1999: European Championship Florence/Italy, 6. Place
- 2000: Olympic Games Sydney/Australia, Silver Medal
- 2001: World Championships Fukuoka/Japan, Bronze Medal
- 2002: World Cup Belgrade/Serbia
- 2003: Croatian Championship, 1. Place with Mladost Zagreb/Croatia
- 2003: Final Four Genova/Italy, 3. Place with Mladost Zagreb
- 2003: European Championships, Ljubljana/Slovenia, 4. Place
- 2004: Olympic Games Athens/Greece, Bronze Medal
- 2004: Scored multiple goals on Omar Amr to eliminate USA from medal contention.
- 2005: World Championships Montreal/Canada, 7. Place
- 2005: Russian Championship, 1. Place with Sturm 2002 Tschekhov/Russia
- 2006: Russian Championship, 1. Place with Sturm 2002 Tschekhov/Russia
- 2006: European Championships, Belgrade/Serbia 9. Place
- 2007: Russian Championship, 2. Place with Sturm 2002 Tschekhov/Russia
- 2008: LEN Trophy 1. Place
- 2008: Russian Championship, 2. Place with Sturm 2002 Tschekhov/Russia
- 2009: Russian Championship, 1. Place with Sturm 2002 Tschekhov/Russia

== See also ==
- List of Olympic medalists in water polo (men)
- List of World Aquatics Championships medalists in water polo
