= Water polo at the 2000 Summer Olympics – Men's tournament =

Men's water polo at the Games of the XXVII Olympiad

Tournament details
- Host country: Australia
- City: Sydney
- Venue(s): Ryde Aquatic Leisure Centre, Sydney International Aquatic Centre
- Dates: 23 September – 1 October 2000
- Teams: 12 (from 4 confederations)
- Competitors: 153

Final positions
- Champions: Hungary (7th title)
- Runners-up: Russia
- Third place: Yugoslavia
- Fourth place: Spain

Tournament statistics
- Matches: 48
- Multiple appearances: 6-time Olympian(s): 1; 5-time Olympian(s): 2; 4-time Olympian(s): 4
- Top scorer(s): (Federal Republic of Yugoslavia) Aleksandar Šapić (18 goals in 8 matches)
- Most saves: (United States) Dan Hackett (70 saves in 8 matches)
- Top sprinter(s): (United States) Brad Schumacher (20 sprints won in 8 matches)

The men's tournament of water polo at the 2000 Summer Olympics at Sydney, Australia, began on September 23 and lasted until October 1, 2000.

== Medalists ==
Gold	Silver	Bronze
Hungary Attila Vári; Zoltán Szécsi; Bulcsú Székely; Zsolt Varga; Tamás Märcz; Tamás Molnár; Barnabás Steinmetz; Tamás Kásás; Gergely Kiss; Zoltán Kósz; Tibor Benedek; Péter Biros; Rajmund Fodor Head Coach: Dénes Kemény	Russia Irek Zinnourov; Dmitri Stratan; Revaz Tchomakhidze; Marat Zakirov; Nikolay Kozlov; Nikolai Maximov; Andrei Reketchinski; Serguei Garbouzov; Dmitry Gorshkov; Yuri Yatsev; Roman Balachov; Dmitri Douquine; Alexandre Erychov Head Coach: Aleksandr Kabanov	FR Yugoslavia Pedrag Zimonjić; Jugoslav Vasović; Vladimir Vujasinović; Nenad Vukanić; Aleksandar Šoštar; Petar Trbojević; Veljko Uskoković; Nikola Kuljača; Aleksandar Šapić; Dejan Savić; Aleksandar Ćirić; Danilo Ikodinović; Viktor Jelenić Head Coach: Nenad Manojlović

== Preliminary round ==
=== Group A ===
Pos	Team	Pld	W	D	L	GF	GA	GD	Pts	Qualification
1	Russia	5	4	1	0	51	28	+23	9	Quarter Finals
2	Italy	5	4	1	0	43	32	+11	9	Quarter Finals
3	Spain	5	2	1	2	32	34	−2	5	Quarter Finals
4	Australia (H)	5	1	2	2	38	36	+2	4	Quarter Finals
5	Kazakhstan	5	1	1	3	41	46	−5	3	
6	Slovakia	5	0	0	5	30	59	−29	0	

Source: LA84
Rules for classification: 1) Points; 2) Head-to-head points; 3) Head-to-head goal difference; 4) Head-to-head goals scored; 5) Goal difference.
(H) Hosts

23 September 2000; 10:45	Slovakia	8–11	Italy	Ryde Aquatic Leisure Centre; Referees: Boyer (USA), Ludecke (GER)
23 September 2000; 10:45	Score by quarters: 0-3, 2-3, 3-2, 3-3			Ryde Aquatic Leisure Centre; Referees: Boyer (USA), Ludecke (GER)

23 September 2000; 15:00	Kazakhstan	7–8	Spain	Ryde Aquatic Leisure Centre; Referees: Klaric (CRO), Margeta (SLO)
23 September 2000; 15:00	Score by quarters: 1-2, 3-2, 1-3, 2-1			Ryde Aquatic Leisure Centre; Referees: Klaric (CRO), Margeta (SLO)

23 September 2000; 17:30	Australia	4–6	Russia	Ryde Aquatic Leisure Centre; Referees: Bookelman (NED), Rajevic (YUG)
23 September 2000; 17:30	Score by quarters: 1-2, 0-1, 1-2, 2-1			Ryde Aquatic Leisure Centre; Referees: Bookelman (NED), Rajevic (YUG)

24 September 2000; 10:45	Russia	7–7	Italy	Ryde Aquatic Leisure Centre; Referees: Tulga (TUR), Margeta (SLO)
24 September 2000; 10:45	Score by quarters: 2-1, 3-3, 2-1, 0-2			Ryde Aquatic Leisure Centre; Referees: Tulga (TUR), Margeta (SLO)

24 September 2000; 15:45	Spain	7–6	Slovakia	Ryde Aquatic Leisure Centre; Referees: Clemencon (FRA), Janseen (NED)
24 September 2000; 15:45	Score by quarters: 1-3, 2-1, 2-2, 2-0			Ryde Aquatic Leisure Centre; Referees: Clemencon (FRA), Janseen (NED)

24 September 2000; 20:30	Australia	11–11	Kazakhstan	Ryde Aquatic Leisure Centre; Referees: Ludecke (GER), Takata (USA)
24 September 2000; 20:30	Score by quarters: 2-4, 3-2, 4-3, 2-2			Ryde Aquatic Leisure Centre; Referees: Ludecke (GER), Takata (USA)

25 September 2000; 10:45	Italy	6–5	Spain	Ryde Aquatic Leisure Centre; Referees: Klaric (CRO), Chasekioglou (GRE)
25 September 2000; 10:45	Score by quarters: 2-1, 1-2, 2-1, 1-1			Ryde Aquatic Leisure Centre; Referees: Klaric (CRO), Chasekioglou (GRE)

25 September 2000; 15:45	Kazakhstan	7–9	Russia	Ryde Aquatic Leisure Centre; Referees: Csaszar (HUN), Moradi Shahpar (IRI)
25 September 2000; 15:45	Score by quarters: 1-1, 1-4, 2-2, 3-2			Ryde Aquatic Leisure Centre; Referees: Csaszar (HUN), Moradi Shahpar (IRI)

25 September 2000; 20:30	Slovakia	6–11	Australia	Ryde Aquatic Leisure Centre; Referees: Bookelman (NED), Boyer (USA)
25 September 2000; 20:30	Score by quarters: 1-4, 1-3, 2-3, 2-1			Ryde Aquatic Leisure Centre; Referees: Bookelman (NED), Boyer (USA)

26 September 2000; 10:45	Russia	8–5	Spain	Ryde Aquatic Leisure Centre; Referees: Margeta (SLO), Schwartz (ISR)
26 September 2000; 10:45	Score by quarters: 4-3, 1-0, 1-1, 2-1			Ryde Aquatic Leisure Centre; Referees: Margeta (SLO), Schwartz (ISR)

26 September 2000; 15:45	Kazakhstan	9–5	Slovakia	Ryde Aquatic Leisure Centre; Referees: Rajevic (YUG), Mendendez Betancourt (CUB)
26 September 2000; 15:45	Score by quarters: 4-0, 1-0, 1-2, 3-3			Ryde Aquatic Leisure Centre; Referees: Rajevic (YUG), Mendendez Betancourt (CUB)

26 September 2000; 20:30	Australia	5–6	Italy	Ryde Aquatic Leisure Centre; Referees: Turcotte (CAN), Clemencon (FRA)
26 September 2000; 20:30	Score by quarters: 1-0, 1-2, 3-2, 0-2			Ryde Aquatic Leisure Centre; Referees: Turcotte (CAN), Clemencon (FRA)

27 September 2000; 10:45	Slovakia	5–21	Russia	Ryde Aquatic Leisure Centre; Referees: Klaric (CRO), Janseen van de Laak (NED)
27 September 2000; 10:45	Score by quarters: 1-7, 1-5, 1-6, 2-3			Ryde Aquatic Leisure Centre; Referees: Klaric (CRO), Janseen van de Laak (NED)

27 September 2000; 15:45	Italy	13–7	Kazakhstan	Ryde Aquatic Leisure Centre; Referees: Boyer (USA), Csaszar (HUN)
27 September 2000; 15:45	Score by quarters: 2-1, 2-1, 5-3, 4-2			Ryde Aquatic Leisure Centre; Referees: Boyer (USA), Csaszar (HUN)

27 September 2000; 20:30	Australia	7–7	Spain	Ryde Aquatic Leisure Centre; Referees: Bookelman (NED), Chasekioglou (GRE)
27 September 2000; 20:30	Score by quarters: 0-2, 2-1, 3-2, 2-2			Ryde Aquatic Leisure Centre; Referees: Bookelman (NED), Chasekioglou (GRE)

=== Group B ===
Pos	Team	Pld	W	D	L	GF	GA	GD	Pts	Qualification
1	FR Yugoslavia	5	4	1	0	41	22	+19	9	Quarter Finals
2	Croatia	5	4	1	0	42	30	+12	9	Quarter Finals
3	Hungary	5	3	0	2	49	39	+10	6	Quarter Finals
4	United States	5	2	0	3	42	39	+3	4	Quarter Finals
5	Netherlands	5	1	0	4	34	55	−21	2	
6	Greece	5	0	0	5	22	45	−23	0	

Source: LA84
Rules for classification: 1) Points; 2) Head-to-head points; 3) Head-to-head goal difference; 4) Head-to-head goals scored; 5) Goal difference.

23 September 2000; 09:30	Greece	4–7	Hungary	Ryde Aquatic Leisure Centre; Referees: Kratochvil (SVK), Balfanbayev (KAZ)
23 September 2000; 09:30	Score by quarters: 0-3, 1-2, 2-0, 1-2			Ryde Aquatic Leisure Centre; Referees: Kratochvil (SVK), Balfanbayev (KAZ)

23 September 2000; 12:00	FR Yugoslavia	9–1	Netherlands	Ryde Aquatic Leisure Centre; Referees: Moliner Molins (ESP), Turcotte (CAN)
23 September 2000; 12:00	Score by quarters: 3-0, 3-1, 2-0, 1-0			Ryde Aquatic Leisure Centre; Referees: Moliner Molins (ESP), Turcotte (CAN)

23 September 2000; 16:15	Croatia	10–7	United States	Ryde Aquatic Leisure Centre; Referees: Kerr (AUS), Galkine (RUS)
23 September 2000; 16:15	Score by quarters: 3-1, 4-1, 1-2, 2-3			Ryde Aquatic Leisure Centre; Referees: Kerr (AUS), Galkine (RUS)

24 September 2000; 9:30	Hungary	16–8	Netherlands	Ryde Aquatic Leisure Centre; Referees: Prikhodko (KAZ), Melliar (RSA)
24 September 2000; 9:30	Score by quarters: 5-3, 3-2, 3-2, 5-1			Ryde Aquatic Leisure Centre; Referees: Prikhodko (KAZ), Melliar (RSA)

24 September 2000; 14:30	United States	5–8	FR Yugoslavia	Ryde Aquatic Leisure Centre; Referees: Moliner Molins (ESP), Schwartz (ISR)
24 September 2000; 14:30	Score by quarters: 1-3, 2-2, 1-2, 1-1			Ryde Aquatic Leisure Centre; Referees: Moliner Molins (ESP), Schwartz (ISR)

24 September 2000; 19:15	Greece	5–9	Croatia	Ryde Aquatic Leisure Centre; Referees: Turcotte (CAN), Afanasiev (RUS)
24 September 2000; 19:15	Score by quarters: 2-3, 1-2, 1-1, 1-3			Ryde Aquatic Leisure Centre; Referees: Turcotte (CAN), Afanasiev (RUS)

25 September 2000; 9:30	Netherlands	8–12	United States	Ryde Aquatic Leisure Centre; Referees: Afanasiev (RUS), Menendez Betancourt (CUB)
25 September 2000; 9:30	Score by quarters: 2-4, 3-3, 1-3, 2-2			Ryde Aquatic Leisure Centre; Referees: Afanasiev (RUS), Menendez Betancourt (CUB)

25 September 2000; 14:30	Croatia	8–7	Hungary	Ryde Aquatic Leisure Centre; Referees: Ludecke (GER), Kratochvil (SVK)
25 September 2000; 14:30	Score by quarters: 2-3, 1-1, 3-1, 2-2			Ryde Aquatic Leisure Centre; Referees: Ludecke (GER), Kratochvil (SVK)

25 September 2000; 19:15	FR Yugoslavia	10–3	Greece	Ryde Aquatic Leisure Centre; Referees: Kerr (AUS), Balfanbayev (KAZ)
25 September 2000; 19:15	Score by quarters: 4-2, 2-1, 3-0, 1-0			Ryde Aquatic Leisure Centre; Referees: Kerr (AUS), Balfanbayev (KAZ)

26 September 2000; 09:30	Hungary	10–9	United States	Ryde Aquatic Leisure Centre; Referees: Tulga (TUR), Galkine (RUS)
26 September 2000; 09:30	Score by quarters: 3-1, 2-3, 3-4, 2-1			Ryde Aquatic Leisure Centre; Referees: Tulga (TUR), Galkine (RUS)

26 September 2000; 14:30	Greece	7–10	Netherlands	Ryde Aquatic Leisure Centre; Referees: Prikhodko (KAZ), Bower (AUS)
26 September 2000; 14:30	Score by quarters: 2-3, 2-3, 1-2, 2-2			Ryde Aquatic Leisure Centre; Referees: Prikhodko (KAZ), Bower (AUS)

26 September 2000; 19:15	Croatia	4–4	FR Yugoslavia	Ryde Aquatic Leisure Centre; Referees: Dani (ITA), Afanasiev (RUS)*
26 September 2000; 19:15	Score by quarters: 1-2, 0-0, 2-1, 1-1			Ryde Aquatic Leisure Centre; Referees: Dani (ITA), Afanasiev (RUS)*

27 September 2000; 09:30	FR Yugoslavia	10–9	Hungary	Ryde Aquatic Leisure Centre; Referees: Kerr (AUS), Ludecke (GER)
27 September 2000; 09:30	Score by quarters: 3-3, 2-3, 3-2, 2-1			Ryde Aquatic Leisure Centre; Referees: Kerr (AUS), Ludecke (GER)

27 September 2000; 14:30	Netherlands	7–11	Croatia	Ryde Aquatic Leisure Centre; Referees: Balfanbayev (KAZ), Melliar (RSA)
27 September 2000; 14:30	Score by quarters: 1-1, 1-4, 3-3, 2-3			Ryde Aquatic Leisure Centre; Referees: Balfanbayev (KAZ), Melliar (RSA)

27 September 2000; 19:15	Greece	3–9	United States	Ryde Aquatic Leisure Centre; Referees: Clemencon (FRA), Tulga (TUR)
27 September 2000; 19:15	Score by quarters: 0-2, 0-3, 0-2, 3-2			Ryde Aquatic Leisure Centre; Referees: Clemencon (FRA), Tulga (TUR)

== Classification for 9th-12th ==
Team	Pld	W	L	D	GF	GA	GD	Pts
Kazakhstan	3	2	0	1	23	18	+5	5
Greece	3	1	0	2	24	20	+4	4
Netherlands	3	1	1	1	19	20	-1	3
Slovakia	3	0	3	0	24	32	-8	0

29 September 2000; 09:30	Kazakhstan	6–6	Greece	Ryde Aquatic Leisure Centre; Referees: Schwartz (ISR), Menendez Betancourt (CUB)
29 September 2000; 09:30	Score by quarters: 0-3, 3-1, 1-2, 2-0			Ryde Aquatic Leisure Centre; Referees: Schwartz (ISR), Menendez Betancourt (CUB)

29 September 2000; 10:45	Slovakia	8–9	Netherlands	Ryde Aquatic Leisure Centre; Referees: Bower (AUS), Moradi Shahpar (IRI)
29 September 2000; 10:45	Score by quarters: 1-1, 2-2, 3-4, 2-2			Ryde Aquatic Leisure Centre; Referees: Bower (AUS), Moradi Shahpar (IRI)

30 September 2000; 10:00	Kazakhstan	11–8	Slovakia	Ryde Aquatic Leisure Centre; Referees: Boyer (USA), Melliar (RSA)
30 September 2000; 10:00	Score by quarters: 4-1, 3-1, 2-2, 2-4			Ryde Aquatic Leisure Centre; Referees: Boyer (USA), Melliar (RSA)

30 September 2000; 11:15	Netherlands	6–6	Greece	Ryde Aquatic Leisure Centre; Referees: Klaric (CRO), Csaszar (HUN)
30 September 2000; 11:15	Score by quarters: 0-2, 2-1, 1-3, 3-0			Ryde Aquatic Leisure Centre; Referees: Klaric (CRO), Csaszar (HUN)

1 October 2000; 9:00	Slovakia	8–12	Greece	Ryde Aquatic Leisure Centre; Referees: Takata (USA), Moradi Shahpar (IRI)
1 October 2000; 9:00	Score by quarters: 2-3, 4-3, 1-1, 1-5			Ryde Aquatic Leisure Centre; Referees: Takata (USA), Moradi Shahpar (IRI)

1 October 2000; 10:15	Kazakhstan	6–4	Netherlands	Ryde Aquatic Leisure Centre; Referees: Menendez Betancourt (CUB), Margeta (SLO)
1 October 2000; 10:15	Score by quarters: 1-2, 2-0, 2-1, 1-1			Ryde Aquatic Leisure Centre; Referees: Menendez Betancourt (CUB), Margeta (SLO)

== Knockout stage ==
=== Bracket ===
Quarter-finals
29 September
Russia	11
United States	10
29 September
Croatia	8
Spain	9
29 September
Italy	5
Hungary	8
29 September
Yugoslavia	7
Australia	3

Semi-finals
30 September
Russia	8
Spain	7
30 September
Hungary	8
Yugoslavia	7

Gold medal
1 October
Russia	6
Hungary	13
Bronze medal
1 October
Yugoslavia	8
Spain	3

Fifth place bracket

5–8th place semifinals
30 September
United States	9
Croatia	8
30 September
Italy	8
Australia	4

Fifth place
1 October
United States	8
Italy	10
Seventh place
1 October
Croatia	10
Australia	8

=== Quarterfinals ===
29 September 2000; 14:30	Russia	11–10	United States	Ryde Aquatic Leisure Centre; Referees: Bookelman (NED), Margeta (SLO)
29 September 2000; 14:30	Score by quarters: 3-0, 2-4, 4-3, 2-3			Ryde Aquatic Leisure Centre; Referees: Bookelman (NED), Margeta (SLO)

29 September 2000; 15:45	Italy	5–8	Hungary	Ryde Aquatic Leisure Centre; Referees: Tulga (TUR), Chasekioglou (GRE)
29 September 2000; 15:45	Score by quarters: 0-2, 3-3, 2-2, 0-1			Ryde Aquatic Leisure Centre; Referees: Tulga (TUR), Chasekioglou (GRE)

29 September 2000; 19:15	Spain	9–8	Croatia	Ryde Aquatic Leisure Centre; Referees: Prikhodko (KAZ), Clemencon (FRA)
29 September 2000; 19:15	Score by quarters: 1-1, 3-1, 2-3, 3-3			Ryde Aquatic Leisure Centre; Referees: Prikhodko (KAZ), Clemencon (FRA)

29 September 2000; 20:30	Australia	3–7	FR Yugoslavia	Ryde Aquatic Leisure Centre; Referees: Ludecke (GER), Turcotte (CAN)
29 September 2000; 20:30	Score by quarters: 1-2, 0-2, 1-2, 1-1			Ryde Aquatic Leisure Centre; Referees: Ludecke (GER), Turcotte (CAN)

=== 5–8th place semifinals ===
30 September 2000; 19:00	United States	9–8	Croatia	Ryde Aquatic Leisure Centre; Referees: Moliner Molins (ESP), Clemencon (FRA)
30 September 2000; 19:00	Score by quarters: 1-0, 2-2, 2-2, 2-3,1-1,1-0			Ryde Aquatic Leisure Centre; Referees: Moliner Molins (ESP), Clemencon (FRA)

30 September 2000; 20:15	Italy	8–4	Australia	Ryde Aquatic Leisure Centre; Referees: Bookelman (NED), Prikhodko (KAZ)
30 September 2000; 20:15	Score by quarters: 2-2, 2-2, 2-0, 2-0			Ryde Aquatic Leisure Centre; Referees: Bookelman (NED), Prikhodko (KAZ)

=== Semifinals ===
30 September 2000; 14:30	Russia	8–7	Spain	Ryde Aquatic Leisure Centre; Referees: Dani (ITA), Katochvil (SVK)
30 September 2000; 14:30	Score by quarters: 3-3, 2-1, 1-1, 1-2, 0-0, 0-0, 1-0			Ryde Aquatic Leisure Centre; Referees: Dani (ITA), Katochvil (SVK)

30 September 2000; 15:45	Hungary	8–7	FR Yugoslavia	Ryde Aquatic Leisure Centre; Referees: Kerr (AUS), Ludecke (GER)
30 September 2000; 15:45	Score by quarters: 3-2, 2-3, 2-2, 1-0			Ryde Aquatic Leisure Centre; Referees: Kerr (AUS), Ludecke (GER)

=== Seventh place game ===
1 October 2000; 11:30	Croatia	10–8	Australia	Ryde Aquatic Leisure Centre; Referees: Boyer (USA), Turcotte (CAN)
1 October 2000; 11:30	Score by quarters: 2-2, 2-2, 4-2, 2-2			Ryde Aquatic Leisure Centre; Referees: Boyer (USA), Turcotte (CAN)

=== Fifth place game ===
1 October 2000; 12:45	United States	8–10	Italy	Ryde Aquatic Leisure Centre; Referees: Rajevic (YUG), Ludecke (GER)
1 October 2000; 12:45	Score by quarters: 2-4, 1-3, 3-1, 2-2			Ryde Aquatic Leisure Centre; Referees: Rajevic (YUG), Ludecke (GER)

=== Bronze medal game ===
1 October 2000; 15:00	Spain	3–8	FR Yugoslavia	Sydney International Aquatic Centre; Referees: Tulga (TUR), Afanasiev (RUS)
1 October 2000; 15:00	Score by quarters: 1-2, 1-2, 1-2, 0-2			Sydney International Aquatic Centre; Referees: Tulga (TUR), Afanasiev (RUS)

=== Gold medal game ===
1 October 2000; 16:15	Russia	6–13	Hungary	Sydney International Aquatic Centre; Referees: Bookelman (NED), Chasekioglou (GRE)
1 October 2000; 16:15	Score by quarters: 1-3, 1-5, 2-2, 2-3			Sydney International Aquatic Centre; Referees: Bookelman (NED), Chasekioglou (GRE)

== Ranking and statistics ==
=== Final rankings ===
Rank	Team
Gold medal	Hungary
Silver medal	Russia
Bronze medal	FR Yugoslavia
4.	Spain
5.	Italy
6.	United States
7.	Croatia
8.	Australia
9.	Kazakhstan
10.	Greece
11.	Netherlands
12.	Slovakia

2000 Men's Olympic champions

Hungary
Seventh title

=== Multi-time Olympians ===
Six-time Olympian(s): 1 player

- Spain: Manuel Estiarte

Five-time Olympian(s): 2 players

- Greece: George Mavrotas
- Spain: Jordi Sans

Four-time Olympian(s): 4 players

- Greece: Filippos Kaiafas
- Spain: Pedro García, Salvador Gómez, Jesús Rollán (GK)

=== Leading goalscorers ===
Rank	Player	Team	Goals	Matches played	Goals per match	Shots	%
1	Aleksandar Šapić	Yugoslavia	18	8	2.250	50	36.0%
2	Aleksandr Yeryshov	Russia	17	8	2.125	51	33.3%
3	Chris Humbert	United States	16	8	2.000	39	41.0%
3	Harry van der Meer	Netherlands	16	8	2.000	44	36.4%
3	Wolf Wigo	United States	16	8	2.000	25	64.0%
6	Ioannis Thomakos	Greece	15	8	1.875	30	50.0%
7	Revaz Chomakhidze	Russia	14	8	1.750	32	43.8%
7	Gergely Kiss	Hungary	14	8	1.750	24	58.3%
9	Tony Azevedo	United States	13	8	1.625	40	32.5%
10	Tamás Kásás	Hungary	12	8	1.500	33	36.4%
10	Daniel Marsden	Australia	12	8	1.500	40	30.0%

Source: Official Results Book (page 45–92)

=== Leading goalkeepers ===
Rank	Goalkeeper	Team	Saves	Matches played	Saves per match	Shots	%
1	Dan Hackett	United States	70	8	8.750	135	51.9%
2	Arie van de Bunt	Netherlands	65	8	8.125	140	46.4%
3	Zoltán Kósz	Hungary	58	8	7.250	112	51.8%
3	Nikolay Maksimov	Russia	58	8	7.250	99	58.6%
3	Jesús Rollán	Spain	58	8	7.250	116	50.0%
6	Eddie Denis	Australia	56	8	7.000	107	52.3%
7	Konstantin Chernov	Kazakhstan	52	8	6.500	96	54.2%
8	Aleksandar Šoštar	Yugoslavia	49	8	6.125	85	57.6%
9	Nikolaos Deligiannis	Greece	48	8	6.000	97	49.5%
10	István Gergely	Slovakia	44	8	5.500	110	40.0%

Source: Official Results Book (page 45–92)

=== Leading sprinters ===
Rank	Sprinter	Team	Sprints won	Matches played	Sprints won per match	Sprints contested	%
1	Brad Schumacher	United States	20	8	2.500	34	58.8%
2	Aleksandar Ćirić	Yugoslavia	17	8	2.125	24	70.8%
3	Tamás Kásás	Hungary	15	8	1.875	29	51.7%
3	Nathan Thomas	Australia	15	8	1.875	19	78.9%
5	Róbert Káid	Slovakia	12	8	1.500	16	75.0%
5	Ioannis Thomakos	Greece	12	8	1.500	18	66.7%
7	Roman Balashov	Russia	11	8	1.375	15	73.3%
8	Milan Cipov	Slovakia	10	8	1.250	12	83.3%
8	Alberto Ghibellini	Italy	10	8	1.250	16	62.5%
8	Sergi Pedrerol	Spain	10	8	1.250	27	37.0%

Source: Official Results Book (page 44)

== Sources ==
- PDF documents in the LA84 Foundation Digital Library:
  - Official Results Book – 2000 Olympic Games – Water Polo (download, archive)
- Water polo on the Olympedia website
  - Water polo at the 2000 Summer Olympics (men's tournament)
- Water polo on the Sports Reference website
  - Water polo at the 2000 Summer Games (men's tournament) (archived)
