= Nenad Manojlović =

Water polo player and coach, Yeguslavia, Serbia

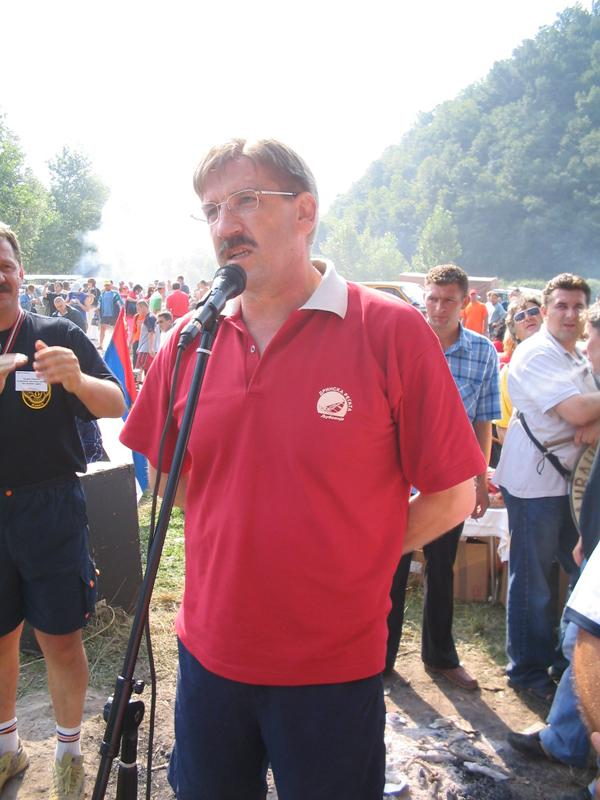
- Manojlović in July 2006

Personal information
- Native name: Ненад Манојловић
- Nationality: Yugoslav / Serbian
- Born: 25 March 1954 Belgrade, PR Serbia, FPR Yugoslavia
- Died: 24 November 2014 (aged 60) Belgrade, Serbia

Sport
- Sport: Water polo
Medal record
Men's water polo
Representing Yugoslavia
Olympic Games
| Silver medal – second place | 2004 Athens | Team |
| Bronze medal – third place | 2000 Sydney | Team |
World Championship
| Silver medal – second place | 2001 Fukuoka | Team |
| Bronze medal – third place | 2003 Barcelona | Team |
European Championship
| Gold medal – first place | 2001 Budapest |
| Gold medal – first place | 2003 Kranj |
World Cup
| Bronze medal – third place | 2002 Belgrade |
| Gold medal – first place | 2006 Budapest |

Nenad Manojlović (Serbian: Ненад Манојловић; 25 March 1954 – 24 November 2014) was a Yugoslav and Serbian water polo player and manager. His brother Predrag also played the sport at elite level.

As manager of Serbia and Montenegro men's national water polo team (formerly the FR Yugoslavia men's national water polo team), Manojlović won silver and bronze medals in the Summer Olympics in Athens 2004 and Sydney 2000, silver and bronze medals in the World Championships 2001 in Fukuoka and 2003 in Barcelona and gold medals in the European championships 2001 in Budapest and 2003 in Kranj.

Manojlović died on 24 November 2014, while being on the way to Sofia where he was to participate in the professional seminar.
