= Peter Nižný =

Slovak water polo player (born 1977)

Personal information
- Nationality: Slovak
- Born: 8 March 1977 (age 48); Bojnice, Czechoslovakia

Sport
- Sport: Water polo

Peter Nižný (born 8 March 1977) is a Slovak water polo player. He competed in the men's tournament at the 2000 Summer Olympics.
