= Steffen Dierolf =

German water polo player

Personal information
- Nationality: Germany
- Born: 5 May 1976 (age 50) Esslingen am Neckar, West Germany
- Height: 1.93 m (6 ft 4 in)
- Weight: 92 kg (203 lb)

Sport
- Sport: Water polo
- Position: driver

Senior clubs
- Years: Team
- ?-?: SV Cannstatt
National team
- Years: Team
- ?-?: Germany

Steffen Dierolf (born 5 May 1976) is a German male water polo player. He was a member of the Germany men's national water polo team, playing as a driver. He was a part of the team at the 2004 Summer Olympics. On club level he played for SV Cannstatt in Germany.
