= Harry van der Meer =

Dutch water polo player (born 1973)

Henricus Antonius Wilhelmus "Harry" van der Meer (born October 30, 1973, in Veenendaal) is a former water polo forward from the Netherlands, who participated in three Summer Olympics. From 1992 on he finished in ninth (Barcelona), tenth (Atlanta, Georgia) and eleventh (Sydney) position with the National Men's Team. Now, he is a coach.

== See also ==
- Netherlands men's Olympic water polo team records and statistics
- List of men's Olympic water polo tournament top goalscorers
