= Fabrizio Buonocore =

Italian water polo player

Personal information
- Born: 28 April 1977 (age 49) Naples, Italy

Sport
- Sport: Water polo
Medal record
Representing Italy
World Championships
Silver medal – second place	2003 Barcelona	Team competition

Fabrizio Buonocore (born 28 April 1977) is an Italian water polo player who competed in the 2004 Summer Olympics and in the 2008 Summer Olympics.

== See also ==
- List of World Aquatics Championships medalists in water polo
