= Gejza Gyurcsi =

Slovak water polo player (born 1976)

Personal information
- Nationality: Slovak
- Born: 21 September 1976 (age 48); Bratislava, Czechoslovakia

Sport
- Sport: Water polo

Gejza Gyurcsi (born 21 September 1976) is a Slovak water polo player. He competed in the men's tournament at the 2000 Summer Olympics.
