= Aleksandar Šoštar =

Serbian water polo player (born 1964)

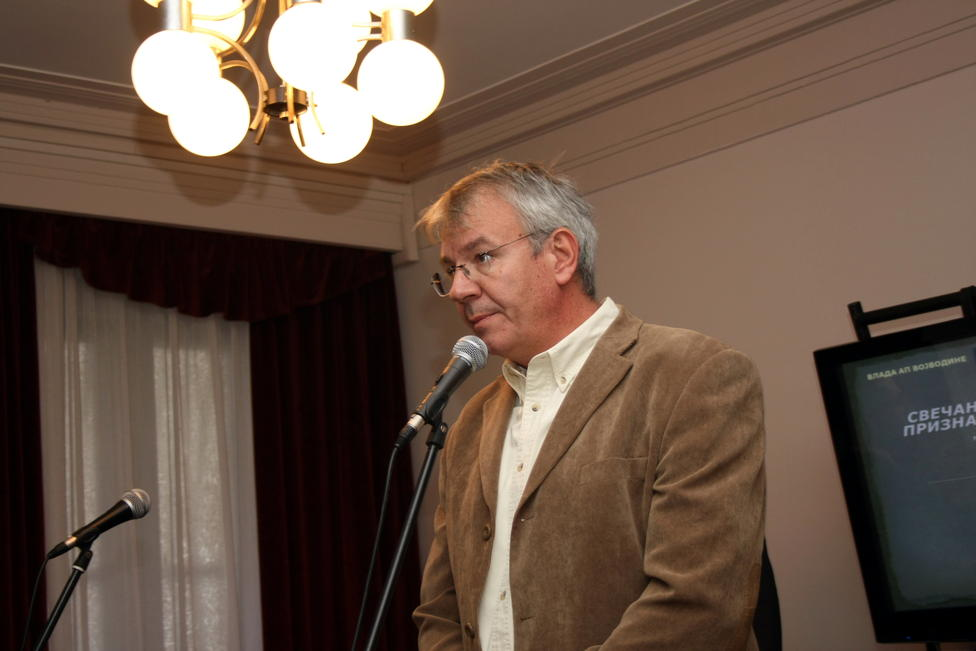
- Šoštar in 2012

Personal information
- Born: 21 January 1964 (age 62) Niš, SR Serbia, SFR Yugoslavia
- Height: 196 cm (6 ft 5 in)
- Weight: 102 kg (225 lb)
Medal record
Men's Water Polo
Representing Yugoslavia
Olympic Games
Gold medal – first place	1988 Seoul
World Championship
Gold medal – first place	1991 Perth
European Championship
Gold medal – first place	1991 Athens
Mediterranean Games
Silver medal – second place	1991 Athens
Representing FR Yugoslavia
Olympic Games
Bronze medal – third place	2000 Sydney
World Championship
Silver medal – second place	2001 Fukuoka
European Championship
Gold medal – first place	2001 Budapest

Aleksandar Šoštar (Serbian Cyrillic: Александар Шоштар; born 21 January 1964) is a Serbian water polo goalkeeper who played on the bronze medal squad of FR Yugoslavia at the 2000 Summer Olympics and on the gold medal squad for SFR Yugoslavia at the 1988 Summer Olympics.

In 2001 he was declared Athlete of the Year and Sportsman of the Year in Yugoslavia.

He currently performs the functions of the President Water Polo Club Partizan and President of the Sports Federation of Serbia.

== Early life ==
Šoštar was born in Niš to Croatian father Stjepan Šoštar and Serbian mother. His father who hails from the town of Ivanec moved to Belgrade during the late 1950s as an employee of the Yugoslav People's Army (JNA) where he remained living after marrying a woman from Niš and starting a family. Though the family lived in Belgrade, Aleksandar was born in Niš due to his mother visiting her relatives at the time.

== Club career ==
=== Clubs ===
- (Socialist Federal Republic of Yugoslavia) Partizan (1981–1992)
- (Italy) Posillipo (1992–1994)
- (Federal Republic of Yugoslavia) Budvanska Rivijera (1994)
- (Spain) Barcelona (1994–1996)
- (Federal Republic of Yugoslavia) Budvanska Rivijera (1996–1997) 2x
- (Federal Republic of Yugoslavia) NIS Naftagas-Bečej (1997–2001)
- (Hungary) FTC-VMAX (2001–2002)

== See also ==
- Yugoslavia men's Olympic water polo team records and statistics
- Serbia and Montenegro men's Olympic water polo team records and statistics
- List of Olympic champions in men's water polo
- List of Olympic medalists in water polo (men)
- List of men's Olympic water polo tournament goalkeepers
- List of world champions in men's water polo
- List of World Aquatics Championships medalists in water polo
- List of members of the International Swimming Hall of Fame

Awards
Preceded by Vladimir Grbić	(Federal Republic of Yugoslavia) The Best Athlete of Yugoslavia; 2001	Succeeded by Dejan Bodiroga
