= Arie van de Bunt =

Dutch water polo player (born 1969)

Personal information
- Born: June 7, 1969 (age 56) Amersfoort, Netherlands

Sport
- Sport: Water polo
- Retired: 2005

Arend Jantinus "Arie" van de Bunt (born 7 June 1969) is a former water polo goalkeeper from the Netherlands, who participated in three Summer Olympics for Holland. From 1992 on he finished in ninth (Barcelona), tenth (Atlanta) and eleventh (Sydney) position with the National Men's Team. He retired from the sport in the spring of 2005.

== See also ==
- Netherlands men's Olympic water polo team records and statistics
- List of men's Olympic water polo tournament goalkeepers
