= Nikolaos Deligiannis (water polo) =

Greek water polo player

Nikos Deligiannis
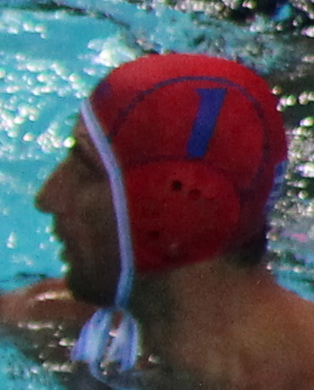
- Deligiannis at the 2012 Summer Olympics

Personal information
- Nationality: Greece
- Born: 3 September 1976 (age 50) Athens

Sport
- Sport: Water polo
- Position: Goalkeeper

Senior clubs
- Years: Team
- 1994–2001 2001–2015: ANO Glyfada; Olympiacos
Medal record
Men's Water polo
Representing Greece
World Championships
Bronze medal – third place	2005 Montreal	Team competition
World League
Bronze medal – third place	2004 Long Beach	Team competition

Nikolaos "Nikos" Deligiannis (Greek: Νικόλαος Δεληγιάννης, born 3 September 1976) is a Greek former water polo player who competed in the 2000 Summer Olympics (10th place), the 2004 Summer Olympics (4th place), the 2008 Summer Olympics (7th place) and the 2012 Summer Olympics (9th place) with the Greece men's national water polo team. (Note: Nikolaos Deligiannis. London 2012. The London Organising Committee of the Olympic Games and Paralympic Games Limited. Archived from the original by the Internet Archive.) He was also part of the Greece national squad who won the Bronze Medal in the 2005 World Championship in Montreal and the Bronze Medal in the 2004 World League in Long Beach.

At club level, Deligiannis had a long and successful career playing for Greek powerhouse Olympiacos for 14 years (2001–2015), with whom he won 1 LEN Champions League, 1 LEN Super Cup, 12 Greek Championships and 12 Greek Cups. He was also captain of Olympiacos for several years.

== Honours ==
=== Club ===
Olympiacos

- LEN Euroleague (1): 2001–02
- LEN Super Cup (1): 2002
- Greek Championship (12): 2002, 2003, 2004, 2005, 2007, 2008, 2009, 2010, 2011, 2013, 2014, 2015
- Greek Cup (12): 2002, 2003, 2004, 2006, 2007, 2008, 2009, 2010, 2011, 2013, 2014, 2015

=== National team ===
- (bronze) Bronze Medal in 2005 World Championship, Montreal
- (bronze) Bronze Medal in 2004 World League, Long Beach
- 4th place in 2004 Olympic Games, Athens
- 4th place in 2003 World Championship, Barcelona

== See also ==
- Greece men's Olympic water polo team records and statistics
- List of players who have appeared in multiple men's Olympic water polo tournaments
- List of men's Olympic water polo tournament goalkeepers
- List of World Aquatics Championships medalists in water polo
