= Zoltán Kósz =

Hungarian water polo player

Personal information
- Nickname: Csita
- Nationality: Hungarian
- Born: 26 November 1967 (age 58) Budapest, Hungary
- Height: 1.92 m (6 ft 3 1/2 in)

Sport
- Sport: Water polo
- Handedness: Right
- Position: Goalkeeper

Youth career
- Years: Team
- 1976–: Vasas

Senior clubs
- Years: Team
- –1997: Vasas-Plaket
- 1997–1998: Mladost-Hrvatska Lutrija
- 1998–2001: FTC-Mirato
- 2001–2004: Vasas-Plaket-Euroleasing
- 2004–2007: PVSK-Füszért
National team
Years	Team	Apps
1986–2001 2006	Hungary	228

Teams coached
- 2004: Vasas (youth director)
- 2005–2011: KÓPÉ SE
- 2006–2008: Hungary women's (assistant)
- 2011–: MTK Szentendre
- 2012–2018: Szolnoki Dózsa (goalkeeping)
- 2018–: A-HÍD OSC Újbuda (goalkeeping)
Medal record
Men's water polo
Representing Hungary
Olympic Games
Gold medal – first place	2000 Sydney	Team competition
FINA World Cup
Gold medal – first place	1999 Sydney	Team competition

Zoltán Kósz (born 26 November 1967 in Budapest) is a Hungarian water polo player, who played on the gold medal squad at the 2000 Summer Olympics. Kosz also competed at the 1996 Summer Olympics, where the Hungarian team placed 4th.

He is nicknamed Cheeta, and made his debut for the national team in 1986.

== Honours ==
=== National ===
- Olympic Games: Gold medal - 2000
- World Championships: Silver medal - 1998
- European Championship: Gold medal - 1997, 1999; Silver medal - 1995; Bronze medal - 2001
- FINA World Cup: Gold medal - 1995, 1999; Bronze medal - 1997

228 present in the national team of Hungary.

=== Club ===
European competitions:

- Cup Winners' Cup Winners (2): (1995, 2002 - with Vasas)

Domestic competitions:

- Hungarian Championship (OB I): 2x (1989 - with Vasas; 2000 - with FTC)
- Hungarian Cup (Magyar Kupa): 4x (1992, 1994, 1996 (1), 2002 - with Vasas)
- Hungarian SuperCup (Szuperkupa): 1x (2001 - with Vasas)
- Croatian Cup (Kup Hrvatske): 1x (1998 - with Mladost)

== Awards ==
- Hungarian Water Polo Player of the Year: 1995, 1997
- Member of the Hungarian team of year: 1997, 1999, 2000

Orders

- Officer's Cross of the Order of Merit of the Republic of Hungary (2000)

== See also ==
- Hungary men's Olympic water polo team records and statistics
- List of Olympic champions in men's water polo
- List of Olympic medalists in water polo (men)
- List of men's Olympic water polo tournament goalkeepers
- List of World Aquatics Championships medalists in water polo
