= Georgios Reppas =

Greek water polo player

Personal information
- Born: 11 December 1974 (age 51) Athens, Greece

Sport
- Sport: Water polo
Medal record
Representing Greece
World Championships
Bronze medal – third place	2005 Montreal	Team competition

Georgios Reppas (born 11 December 1974) is a Greek water polo player who competed in the 2000 Summer Olympics, in the 2004 Summer Olympics, and in the 2008 Summer Olympics.

== See also ==
- Greece men's Olympic water polo team records and statistics
- List of men's Olympic water polo tournament goalkeepers
- List of World Aquatics Championships medalists in water polo
