= Róbert Káid =

Slovak water polo player (born 1969)

Personal information
- Nationality: Slovak
- Born: 24 July 1969 (age 55); Košice, Czechoslovakia

Sport
- Sport: Water polo

Róbert Káid (born 24 July 1969) is a Slovak water polo player. He competed in the men's tournament at the 2000 Summer Olympics.
