= Dimitrios Mazis =

Greek water polo player

Personal information
- Born: 5 September 1976 (age 49)

Sport
- Sport: Water polo
Medal record
Representing Greece
World Championships
Bronze medal – third place	2005 Montreal	Team competition

Dimitrios Mazis (born 5 September 1976) is a Greek former water polo player who competed in the 2000 Summer Olympics, in the 2004 Summer Olympics, and in the 2008 Summer Olympics.

He currently serves as the head coach of Panathinaikos Water Polo Club.

== See also ==
- List of World Aquatics Championships medalists in water polo
