= Federico Mistrangelo =

Italian water polo player

Personal information
- Born: 11 May 1981 (age 43); Genoa, Italy

Sport
- Sport: Water polo

Federico Mistrangelo (born 11 May 1981) is an Italian water polo player who competed in the 2008 Summer Olympics.
