= Milan Cipov =

Slovak water polo player (born 1976)

Personal information
- Nationality: Slovak
- Born: 22 January 1976 (age 49); Bojnice, Czechoslovakia

Sport
- Sport: Water polo

Milan Cipov (born 22 January 1976) is a Slovak water polo player. He competed in the men's tournament at the 2000 Summer Olympics.
