= Sören Mackeben =

German water polo player

Personal information
- Full name: Sören Christoph Mackeben
- Nationality: Germany
- Born: 29 January 1979 (age 47) Hannover, West Germany
- Height: 183 cm (72 in)
- Weight: 85 kg (187 lb)

Sport
- Sport: Water polo
- Handedness: Right
National team
- Years: Team
- ?-?: Germany

Sören Christoph Mackeben (born 29 January 1979) is a German water polo player who was part of the Germany men's national water polo team. He competed in the 2004 Summer Olympics and in the 2008 Summer Olympics. He was also part of the team at the World Championships, most recently at the 2007 and 2009 World Aquatics Championships.
