= Karol Bačo =

Slovak water polo player (born 1978)

Personal information
- Nationality: Slovak
- Born: 30 May 1978 (age 46); Košice, Czechoslovakia

Sport
- Sport: Water polo

Karol Bačo (born 30 May 1978) is a Slovak water polo player. He competed in the men's tournament at the 2000 Summer Olympics.
