= Mile Smodlaka =

Croatian water polo player

Personal information
- Full name: Mile Smodlaka
- Born: 1 January 1976 (age 50) Split, SR Croatia, SFR Yugoslavia
- Height: 1.98 m (6 ft 6 in)
- Weight: 115 kg (254 lb)

Sport
- Sport: Water polo
- Current club: Jadran Split (head coach); Croatia (assistant)

Senior clubs
- Years: Team
- 1998–2010 2010–2011 2011–2013: Jug; VA Cattaro Kotor; Jadran Split
National team
- Years: Team
- –: Croatia

Teams coached
- 2017– 2020–: Croatia (assistant); Jadran Split
Medal record
Men's water polo
Representing Croatia
World Championship
| Gold medal – first place | 2007 Melbourne | Team |
| Gold medal – first place | 2017 Budapest | Assistant coach |
| Bronze medal – third place | 2019 Gwangju | Assistant coach |
European Championship
| Bronze medal – third place | 2018 Barcelona | Assistant coach |

Mile Smodlaka (born 1 January 1976) is a Croatian former professional water polo player and coach who competed in the 2000, 2004 and the 2008 Summer Olympics. He is currently the head coach of Jadran Split and an assistant coach of the Croatian men's national team.

== See also ==
- List of world champions in men's water polo
- List of World Aquatics Championships medalists in water polo
