= Peter Veszelits =

Slovak water polo player (born 1968)

Personal information
- Nationality: Slovak
- Born: 23 January 1968 (age 57); Košice, Czechoslovakia

Sport
- Sport: Water polo

Peter Veszelits (born 23 January 1968) is a Slovak water polo player. He competed at the 1992 Summer Olympics and the 2000 Summer Olympics.
