= Martin Mravík =

Slovak water polo player (born 1980)

Personal information
- Nationality: Slovak
- Born: 4 May 1980 (age 45); Bratislava, Czechoslovakia

Sport
- Sport: Water polo

Martin Mravík (born 4 May 1980) is a Slovak water polo player. He competed in the men's tournament at the 2000 Summer Olympics.
