= Jozef Hrošík =

Slovak water polo player (born 1981)

Personal information
- Nationality: Slovak
- Born: 26 March 1981 (age 44); Košice, Czechoslovakia

Sport
- Sport: Water polo

Jozef Hrošík (born 26 March 1981) is a Slovak water polo player. He competed in the men's tournament at the 2000 Summer Olympics.
