= Leonardo Binchi =

Italian water polo player

Personal information
- Born: 27 August 1975 (age 49); Province of Livorno, Italy
- Height: 200 cm (6 ft 7 in)

Sport
- Sport: Water polo

Leonardo Binchi (born 27 August 1975) is an Italian water polo player who competed in the 2000 Summer Olympics, in the 2004 Summer Olympics, and in the 2008 Summer Olympics.
