= Viktor Jelenić =

Serbian water polo player

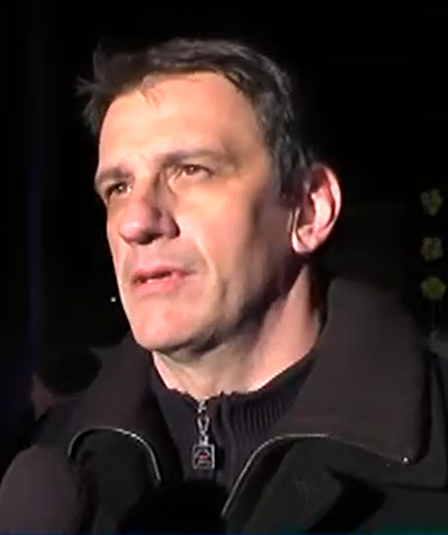
- Jelenić in 2019

Personal information
- Born: October 31, 1970 (age 55) Belgrade, Serbia, SFR Yugoslavia

Sport
- Sport: Water polo
Medal record
Representing Yugoslavia
Olympic Games
Bronze medal – third place	2000 Sydney	Team competition
World Championships
Gold medal – first place	1991 Perth	Team competition
European Championships
Gold medal – first place	1991 Athens	Team competition
Gold medal – first place	2001 Budapest	Team competition
Representing Serbia and Montenegro
Olympic Games
Silver medal – second place	2004 Athens	Team competition
World Championships
Bronze medal – third place	2003 Barcelona	Team competition
FINA World Cup
Bronze medal – third place	2002 Belgrade	Team competition
European Championships
Gold medal – first place	2003 Kranj	Team competition

Viktor Jelenić (Serbian Cyrillic: Виктор Јеленић; born 31 October 1970) is a former Serbian water polo player. He was part of the gold medal winning team of Yugoslavia at the 1991 World Championship. He played on the bronze medal squad of FR Yugoslavia at the 2000 Summer Olympics and the silver medal squad of Serbia and Montenegro at the 2004 Summer Olympics.

He spent 2005/06 season playing for Savona.

== See also ==
- List of Olympic medalists in water polo (men)
- List of world champions in men's water polo
- List of World Aquatics Championships medalists in water polo
