= Fabio Bencivenga =

Italian water polo player (born 1976)

Personal information
- Born: 20 January 1976 (age 50) Curti, Italy

Sport
- Sport: Water polo
Medal record
Representing Italy
Olympic Games
Bronze medal – third place	1996 Atlanta	Team competition
World Championships
Silver medal – second place	2003 Barcelona	Team competition
World Cup
Silver medal – second place	1995 Atlanta	Team competition
Silver medal – second place	1999 Sydney	Team competition

Fabio Bencivenga (born 20 January 1976) is a retired water polo player from Italy, who represented his native country at three consecutive Summer Olympics, starting in 1996 (Atlanta, Georgia). He was a member of the Men's National Team that claimed the bronze medal in 1996.

== See also ==
- Italy men's Olympic water polo team records and statistics
- List of Olympic medalists in water polo (men)
- List of players who have appeared in multiple men's Olympic water polo tournaments
- List of World Aquatics Championships medalists in water polo
