= Juraj Zaťovič =

Slovak water polo player (born 1982)

Personal information
- Nationality: Slovak
- Born: 22 October 1982 (age 43) Bojnice, Czechoslovakia
- Height: 192 cm (76 in)
- Weight: 98 kg (216 lb)

Sport
- Sport: Water polo
- Handedness: Right
- Position: Centre forward
- Number: 3
National team
- Years: Team
- 2000–2016: Slovakia

Juraj Zaťovič (born 22 October 1982 in Bojnice) is a water polo player for the University of Southern California, who received the 2006 Peter J. Cutino Award as the best collegiate water polo player among Division I NCAA teams. His position is two-meter defender.

== Biography ==
While attending Gymnazium-Nováky in Slovakia, Zaťovič played in the Slovak League. He was a member of the Slovak National Team at the 2000 Sydney Olympics. From 2002 through 2006 he attended USC: as a freshman scoring 49 goals, sophomore 57, junior 46 and senior 68, leading the team for all four seasons. As a senior, Juraj Zaťovič became the Trojans' all-time leading scorer as of October 2005 when he scored five goals against UC Santa Barbara. At the NCAA Men's Water Polo Championship in December 2005, his defense earned USC a third national title, and tournament co-MVP honors for Zaťovič. He was selected as the American Water Polo Coaches Association Player of the Year and a first team All-American for the third time. The past two years he was nominated for the Cutino Award, and finally received his Cutino in 2006. Zaťovič is majoring in international relations.
