= Alessandro Calcaterra =

Italian water polo player (born 1975)

Personal information
- Born: 26 May 1975 (age 51) Civitavecchia, Italy
Medal record
Men's water polo
Representing Italy
Olympic Games
Bronze medal – third place	1996 Atlanta	Team competition
World Championships
Silver medal – second place	2003 Barcelona	Team competition
World Cup
Silver medal – second place	1995 Atlanta	Team competition
Silver medal – second place	1999 Sydney	Team competition
Mediterranean Games
Silver medal – second place	2005 Almería	Team competition

Alessandro Calcaterra (born 26 May 1975) is an Italian water polo player, who represented his native country at three consecutive Summer Olympics, starting in 1996 (Atlanta, Georgia). He was a member of the men's national team that claimed the bronze medal in 1996. He was the top goalscorer at the 2008 Olympics, with 27 goals.

== See also ==
- Italy men's Olympic water polo team records and statistics
- List of Olympic medalists in water polo (men)
- List of players who have appeared in multiple men's Olympic water polo tournaments
- List of men's Olympic water polo tournament top goalscorers
- List of World Aquatics Championships medalists in water polo
