= Zoltán Szécsi =

Hungarian water polo player

Personal information
- Nickname: Szecska
- Nationality: Hungarian
- Born: 22 December 1977 (age 48) Budapest, Hungary
- Height: 1.98 m (6 ft 6 in)

Sport
- Sport: Water polo
- Handedness: Right
- Position: Goalkeeper
- Current club: Eger (president)

Youth career
- Years: Team
- –: BVSC

Senior clubs
- Years: Team
- –2004: BVSC-Brendon
- 2004–2005: Brendon-ZF-Eger
- 2005–2006: Betonút-FTC
- 2006–2007: Camogli
- 2007–2013: ZF-Eger
- 2013–2017: Kaposvár
National team
- Years: Team
- 1998–2012: Hungary

Teams coached
- 2015–2017: Kaposvár
- 2018–: ZF-Eger (president)
Medal record
Men's water polo
Representing Hungary
Olympic Games
Gold medal – first place	2000 Sydney	Team competition
Gold medal – first place	2004 Athens	Team competition
Gold medal – first place	2008 Beijing	Team competition
World Championships
Gold medal – first place	2003 Barcelona	Team competition
Silver medal – second place	2005 Montréal	Team competition
Silver medal – second place	2007 Melbourne	Team competition
European Championship
Silver medal – second place	2006 Belgrade	Team competition
Bronze medal – third place	2001 Budapest	Team competition
Bronze medal – third place	2003 Kranj	Team competition
Bronze medal – third place	2008 Málaga	Team competition
Bronze medal – third place	2012 Eindhoven	Team competition
FINA World Cup
Gold medal – first place	1999 Sydney	Team competition
Silver medal – second place	2002 Belgrade	Team competition
Silver medal – second place	2006 Budapest	Team competition
FINA World League
Silver medal – second place	2007 Berlin	Team competition

Zoltán Szécsi (born 22 December 1977) is a Hungarian former water polo goalkeeper, who played on the gold medal squads at the 2000 Summer Olympics, 2004 Summer Olympics and 2008 Summer Olympics. He is one of ten male athletes who won three Olympic gold medals in water polo. He made his international debut for the men's national team in 1998. He currently lives in Eger.

== Honours ==
=== National ===
- Olympic Games: Gold medal - 2000, 2004, 2008
- World Championships: Gold medal - 2003; Silver medal - 2005, 2007
- European Championship: Silver medal - 2006; Bronze medal - 2001, 2003, 2008, 2012
- FINA World League: Gold medal - 2003, 2004; Silver medal - 2007; Bronze medal - 2002
- FINA World Cup: Gold medal - 1999; Silver medal - 2002, 2006
- Universiade: (Silver medal - 1997, 1999)
- Junior World Championships: (Silver medal - 1997)
- Junior European Championship: (Silver medal - 1996)

=== Club ===
- Hungarian Championship (OB I): 6x (1996, 1997, 1998, 1999 - with BVSC; 2011, 2013 - with Eger)
- Hungarian Cup (Magyar Kupa): 4x (2000, 2003 - with BVSC; 2007, 2008 - with Eger)

== Awards ==
- Masterly youth athlete: 1997
- Silver Széchenyi-medallion (2000)
- Member of the Hungarian team of year: 2000, 2003, 2004, 2008
- Hungarian Water Polo Player of the Year: 2004
- Honorary Citizen of Budapest (2008)
- Honorary Citizen of Eger (2008)
- Ministerial Certificate of Merit (2012)
- Member of International Swimming Hall of Fame (2015)

Orders

- Officer's Cross of the Order of Merit of the Republic of Hungary (2000)
- Commander's Cross of the Order of Merit of the Republic of Hungary (2004)
- Commander's Cross of the Order of Merit of the Republic of Hungary with the Star (2008)

== See also ==
- Hungary men's Olympic water polo team records and statistics
- List of multiple Olympic gold medalists in one event
- List of Olympic champions in men's water polo
- List of Olympic medalists in water polo (men)
- List of players who have appeared in multiple men's Olympic water polo tournaments
- List of men's Olympic water polo tournament goalkeepers
- List of world champions in men's water polo
- List of World Aquatics Championships medalists in water polo
- List of members of the International Swimming Hall of Fame
