= Egypt at the 2004 Summer Olympics =

- IOC code: EGY
- NOC: Egyptian Olympic Committee
- Website: www.egyptianolympic.org (in Arabic and English)

in Athens
- Competitors: 97 in 17 sports
- Flag bearer: Ali Ibrahim
- Medals Ranked 46th: Gold 1 Silver 1 Bronze 3 Total 5

Summer Olympics appearances (overview)
- 1912; 1920; 1924; 1928; 1932; 1936; 1948; 1952; 1956; 1960–1964; 1968; 1972; 1976; 1980; 1984; 1988; 1992; 1996; 2000; 2004; 2008; 2012; 2016; 2020; 2024

Other related appearances
- 1906 Intercalated Games –––– United Arab Republic (1960, 1964)

Egypt, represented by the Egyptian Olympic Committee, competed at the 2004 Summer Olympics in Athens, Greece from 13 to 29 August 2004. 97 competitors, 81 men and 16 women, took part in 48 events in 17 sports. Egypt's anthem, Bilady, Bilady, Bilady ("My Homeland, My Homeland, My Homeland") was played when Egypt won a gold medal.

Overall, Egyptian competitors won five medals, including one gold, one silver and three bronze, at the Athens Olympics.

== Medalists ==
Medal	Name	Sport	Event	Date
Gold	Karam Gaber	Wrestling	Men's Greco-Roman 96 kg	August 26
Silver	Mohamed Aly	Boxing	Super heavyweight	August 29
Bronze	Tamer Bayoumi	Taekwondo	Men's 58 kg	August 26
Bronze	Mohamed Elsayed	Boxing	Heavyweight	August 28
Bronze	Ahmed Ismail	Boxing	Light heavyweight	August 29

== Archery ==
Athlete	Event	Ranking round		Round of 64	Round of 32	Round of 16	Quarterfinals	Semifinals	Final / BM	
Athlete	Event	Score	Seed	Opposition Score	Opposition Score	Opposition Score	Opposition Score	Opposition Score	Opposition Score	Rank
Ismail Essam	Men's individual	602	57	Lind (DEN); L 110–158	Did not advance					
Maged Youssef	Men's individual	599	59	Hrachov (UKR); L 128–154	Did not advance					
Lamia Bahnasawy	Women's individual	564	63	Lee S-J (KOR); L 127–164	Did not advance					
May Mansour	Women's individual	536	64	Park S-H (KOR); L 102–154	Did not advance					

== Athletics ==
Egyptian athletes have so far achieved qualifying standards in the following athletics events (up to a maximum of 3 athletes in each event at the 'A' Standard, and 1 at the 'B' Standard).

Key

- Note–Ranks given for track events are within the athlete's heat only
- Q = Qualified for the next round
- q = Qualified for the next round as a fastest loser or, in field events, by position without achieving the qualifying target
- NR = National record
- N/A = Round not applicable for the event
- Bye = Athlete not required to compete in round

Men

Athlete	Event	Qualification		Final	
Athlete	Event	Distance	Position	Distance	Position
Omar Ahmed El Ghazaly	Discus throw	55.53	33	Did not advance	

Women

Athlete	Event	Qualification		Final	
Athlete	Event	Distance	Position	Distance	Position
Marwa Hussein	Hammer throw	62.27	38	Did not advance	

== Boxing ==
Egypt sent six boxers to Athens. They competed in the six heaviest weight classes, with no competitors in Lightweight or below. Five of the Egyptian boxers won their first bouts on the team's way to a silver medal and two bronzes. Their combined record was 10-6, with two of the losses coming from walkovers. Egypt was 7th in the medal ranking for boxing.

Athlete	Event	Round of 32	Round of 16	Quarterfinals	Semifinals	Final	
Athlete	Event	Opposition Result	Opposition Result	Opposition Result	Opposition Result	Opposition Result	Rank
Saleh Khoulef	Light welterweight	Maletin (RUS); L RSC	Did not advance				
Mohamed Hikal	Welterweight	Sultani (AFG); W 40–12	Saitov (RUS); L 17–18	Did not advance			
Ramadan Yasser	Middleweight	Bye	Simion (ROU); W 36–24	Golovkin (KAZ); L 20–31	Did not advance		
Ahmed Ismail El Shamy	Light heavyweight	Kurbanov (TKM); W 44–22	Stewardson (CAN); W 38–22	Pavlidis (GRE); W RSC	Aripgadjiev (BLR); L 20–23	Did not advance	3rd place, bronze medalist(s)
Mohamed Elsayed	Heavyweight	—N/a	Alborov (UZB); W 18^{+}–18	Forsyth (AUS); W 27–12	Zuyev (BLR); L WO	Did not advance	3rd place, bronze medalist(s)
Mohamed Aly	Super heavyweight	—N/a	Takam (CMR); W 32–19	Jakšto (LTU); W 19-11	López (CUB); W 18–16	Povetkin (RUS); L WO	2nd place, silver medalist(s)

== Equestrian ==
=== Show jumping ===
Athlete	Horse	Event	Qualification								Final					Total	
Athlete	Horse	Event	Round 1		Round 2			Round 3			Round A		Round B			Total	
Athlete	Horse	Event	Penalties	Rank	Penalties	Total	Rank	Penalties	Total	Rank	Penalties	Rank	Penalties	Total	Rank	Penalties	Rank
Andre Sakakini	Casper	Individual	10	58	16	26	=55	Retired			Did not advance						

== Fencing ==
Mauro Hamza coached the team.

Men

Athlete	Event	Round of 64	Round of 32	Round of 16	Quarterfinal	Semifinal	Final / BM	
Athlete	Event	Opposition Score	Opposition Score	Opposition Score	Opposition Score	Opposition Score	Opposition Score	Rank
Muhannad Saif El-Din	Individual épée	Rathprasert (THA); L 13–15	Did not advance					
Yasser Mahmoud	Individual épée	Bye	Zhao (CHN); L 9–15	Did not advance				
Ahmed Nabil	Individual épée	Abalof (GRE); W 15–6	Fischer (SUI); L 10–15	Did not advance				
Muhannad Saif El-Din; Yasser Mahmoud; Ahmed Nabil	Team épée	—N/a			Russia; L 30–41	Classification semi-final Ukraine; L 36–45	7th place final China; L 26–45	8
Mostafa Anwar	Individual foil	Rodríguez (VEN); L 7–15	Did not advance					
Mostafa Nagaty	Individual foil	Bye	Joppich (GER); L 10–15	Did not advance				
Tamer Mohamed Tahoun	Individual foil	Bye	Gomes (POR); W 15–14	Wu Hx (CHN); L 8-15	Did not advance			
Mostafa Anwar; Mostafa Nagaty; Tamer Mohamed Tahoun	Team foil	—N/a			Italy; L 20–45	Classification semi-final France; L 32–45	7th place final South Korea; L 35–45	8

Women

Athlete	Event	Round of 32	Round of 16	Quarterfinal	Semifinal	Final / BM	
Athlete	Event	Opposition Score	Opposition Score	Opposition Score	Opposition Score	Opposition Score	Rank
Shaimaa El-Gammal	Individual foil	Boyko (RUS); L 7–13	Did not advance				

== Field hockey ==
=== Men's tournament ===
Roster

The following is the Egyptian roster in the men's field hockey tournament of the 2004 Summer Olympics.

Head coach: Asem Gad

1. Osama Hassanein
2. Ahmed Ramadan
3. Ahmed Mandour
4. Mohamed Kasbr
5. Amro Ibrahim
6. Ahmed Mohamed
7. Yasser Mohamed (C)
8. Ahmed Ibrahim
9. Belal Enaba
10. Sameh Mohamed
12. Walid Mohamed
13. Adnan Ahmed
14. Amrou Metwalli
16. Mohamed El-Mallah (GK)
17. Mohamed El-Sayed
20. Sayed Hagag

Group play

Pos	Team	Pld	W	D	L	GF	GA	GD	Pts	Qualification
1	Spain	5	3	2	0	14	3	+11	11	Semi-finals
2	Germany	5	3	2	0	15	6	+9	11	Semi-finals
3	Pakistan	5	3	0	2	19	8	+11	9	5–8th place semi-finals
4	South Korea	5	2	2	1	17	8	+9	8	5–8th place semi-finals
5	Great Britain	5	1	0	4	9	21	−12	3	9–12th place semi-finals
6	Egypt	5	0	0	5	2	30	−28	0	9–12th place semi-finals

Source: FIH

15 August 2004
20:00

Great Britain	3 – 1	Egypt
Middleton 18'; Fordham 53'; Hawes 59'	Report	S. Mohamed 37'

Umpires:
Henrik Ehlers (DEN)
Satinder Kumar (IND)

17 August 2004
18:30

Egypt	0 – 7	Pakistan
	Report	Jawad 3', 12'; Nadeem 15'; Abbas 30', 34', 38', 58'

Umpires:
Han Jin-Soo (KOR)
Peter Elders (NED)

19 August 2004
18:00

Germany	6 – 1	Egypt
Zeller 17', 67'; Witthaus 38'; Kunz 46'; Bechmann 49', 58'	Report	Enaba 24'

Umpires:
Xavier Adell (ESP)
David Gentles (AUS)

21 August 2004
08:30

Egypt	0 – 11	South Korea
	Report	Lee Jung-Seon 16', 25', 37', 59', 68'; Jeon Jong-Ha 29'; Seo Jong-Ho 57'; Song Seung-Tae 62', 65', 65'; You Hyo-Sik 66'

Umpires:
Padro Teixeira (POR)
Christian Blasch (GER)

23 August 2004
10:30

Spain	3 – 0	Egypt
Tubau 6', 65'; Amat 62'	Report

Umpires:
David Leiper (GBR)
Han Jin-Soo (KOR)

9th-12th Classification Semifinal

25 August 2004
08:30

South Africa	5 – 1	Egypt
Nicol 2', 54', 67'; Fulton 7'; Smith 50'	Report	Ahmed 17'

Umpires:
Pedro Teixeira (POR)
Satinder Kumar (IND)

11th-12th Place Final

27 August 2004
09:00

Egypt	2 – 4	Argentina
El Sayed 21'; Mohamed 43'		Retegui 20'; Almada 26', 48', 62'

Umpires:
Xavier Adell (ESP)
Han Jin-Soo (KOR)

== Handball ==
=== Men's tournament ===
Roster

The following is the Egypt roster in the men's handball tournament of the 2004 Summer Olympics.

Head coaches: Jorn-Uwe Lommel

No.	Pos.	Name	Date of birth (age)	Height	App.	Goals	Club
1	GK	Mohamad Sharaf Eldin	23 December 1974 (aged 29)	1.86 m			(Egypt) Zamalek SC
2	LB	Abdalla Mohamed	26 August 1978 (aged 25)	1.92 m			(Egypt) Zamalek SC
6	RW	Ahmed El Ahmar	27 January 1984 (aged 20)	1.85 m			(Egypt) Zamalek SC
7	RB	Saber Hussein	20 February 1974 (aged 30)	1.94 m			(Egypt) Al Ahly SC
8	P	Wael Fahim	1 January 1976 (aged 28)	1.80 m			(Egypt) Zamalek SC
10	RW	Sherif Moemen	29 April 1974 (aged 30)	1.85 m			(Egypt) Aviation SC
11	LW	Ramy Youssef	13 March 1980 (aged 24)	1.80 m			(Egypt) Zamalek SC
12	GK	Mohamed Nakib	6 April 1974 (aged 30)	1.92 m			(Egypt) El-Olympi
13	RB	Mahmoud Karam	17 November 1982 (aged 21)	1.95 m			(Egypt) Al Ahly SC
14	P	Marwan Ragab	3 August 1974 (aged 30)	1.92 m			(Egypt) Sporting Alexandria
15	LB	Mohamed Abdel Salam	12 January 1982 (aged 22)	1.90 m			(Egypt) Zamalek SC
17	LW	Mohamed Keshk	18 April 1980 (aged 24)	1.88 m			(Egypt) Aviation SC
18	CB	Hany El-Fakharany	6 April 1978 (aged 26)	1.96 m			(Egypt) Al Ahly SC
19	CB	Hassan Yosry	17 July 1978 (aged 25)	1.80 m			(Egypt) Zamalek SC
20	LB	Hussein Zaky	1 March 1979 (aged 25)	1.90 m			(Spain) BM Ciudad Real

Group play

Pos	Team	Pld	W	D	L	GF	GA	GD	Pts	Qualification
1	France	5	5	0	0	135	108	+27	10	Quarterfinals
2	Hungary	5	4	0	1	132	124	+8	8	Quarterfinals
3	Germany	5	3	0	2	139	110	+29	6	Quarterfinals
4	Greece (H)	5	2	0	3	117	130	−13	4	Quarterfinals
5	Brazil	5	1	0	4	105	133	−28	2	
6	Egypt	5	0	0	5	110	133	−23	0	

Rules for classification: 1) Points; 2) Head-to-head points; 3) Head-to-head goal difference; 4) Head-to-head goals scored; 5) Goal difference; 6) Goals scored; 7) Draw.
(H) Hosts

14 August 2004; 11:30	Hungary	33 - 28	Egypt	Sports Pavilion, Athens; Referees: Boye, Jensen (DEN)
14 August 2004; 11:30	Pasztor 9	(16-15)	Zaky 10	Sports Pavilion, Athens; Referees: Boye, Jensen (DEN)
14 August 2004; 11:30	3× (yellow card) 8× (suspension)		3× (yellow card) 3× (suspension)	Sports Pavilion, Athens; Referees: Boye, Jensen (DEN)

16 August 2004; 21:30	Egypt	14 - 26	Germany	Sports Pavilion, Athens; Referees: Arnaldsson, Vidarsson (ISL)
16 August 2004; 21:30	Yosry 4	(5-14)	3 players with 5	Sports Pavilion, Athens; Referees: Arnaldsson, Vidarsson (ISL)
16 August 2004; 21:30	3× (yellow card) 11× (suspension) 1× (red card)		3× (yellow card) 8× (suspension) 1× (red card)	Sports Pavilion, Athens; Referees: Arnaldsson, Vidarsson (ISL)

18 August 2004; 16:30	Greece	26 - 25	Egypt	Sports Pavilion, Athens; Referees: Oie, Togstad (NOR)
18 August 2004; 16:30	Karypidis 10	(18-10)	Keshk 7	Sports Pavilion, Athens; Referees: Oie, Togstad (NOR)
18 August 2004; 16:30	3× (yellow card) 8× (suspension)		3× (yellow card) 4× (suspension) 2× (red card)	Sports Pavilion, Athens; Referees: Oie, Togstad (NOR)

20 August 2004; 21:30	France	22 - 21	Egypt	Sports Pavilion, Athens; Referees: Breto, Huelin Trillo (ESP)
20 August 2004; 21:30	Girault 8	(11-13)	Keshk 6	Sports Pavilion, Athens; Referees: Breto, Huelin Trillo (ESP)
20 August 2004; 21:30	3× (yellow card) 5× (suspension)		4× (yellow card) 8× (suspension) 1× (red card)	Sports Pavilion, Athens; Referees: Breto, Huelin Trillo (ESP)

22 August 2004; 21:30	Egypt	22 – 26	Brazil	Sports Pavilion, Athens; Referees: Hansson, Olsson (SWE)
22 August 2004; 21:30	Abdel Salam 5	(11-10)	Kojoroski 6	Sports Pavilion, Athens; Referees: Hansson, Olsson (SWE)
22 August 2004; 21:30	2× (yellow card) 3× (suspension)		2× (yellow card) 7× (suspension) 1× (red card)	Sports Pavilion, Athens; Referees: Hansson, Olsson (SWE)

11th-12th Classification Final

24 August 2004; 09:30	Slovenia	30 - 24	Egypt	Sports Pavilion, Athens; Referees: Hansson, Olsson (SWE)
24 August 2004; 09:30	Brumen, Zvizej 6	(11-13)	Hassan Yosry 6	Sports Pavilion, Athens; Referees: Hansson, Olsson (SWE)
24 August 2004; 09:30	1× (yellow card) 7× (suspension) 1× (red card)		1× (yellow card) 5× (suspension)	Sports Pavilion, Athens; Referees: Hansson, Olsson (SWE)

== Judo ==
Men

Athlete	Event	Round of 32	Round of 16	Quarterfinals	Semifinals	Repechage 1	Repechage 2	Repechage 3	Final / BM	
Athlete	Event	Opposition Result	Opposition Result	Opposition Result	Opposition Result	Opposition Result	Opposition Result	Opposition Result	Opposition Result	Rank
Amin El Hady	−66 kg	Meridja (ALG); L 0001–1000	Did not advance							
Haitham Awad	−73 kg	Bilodid (UKR); L WO	Did not advance							
Aboumedan El Sayed	−81 kg	Benikhlef (ALG); L 0000–1020	Did not advance							
Hesham Mesbah	−90 kg	Melaping (CMR); W 0100–0000	Morgan (CAN); L 0001-0011	Did not advance						
Bassel El Gharbawy	−100 kg	Loforte (ARG); W 0002–0001	van der Geest (NED); L 0000–1000	Did not advance		Miraliyev (AZE); L 0000–1010	Did not advance			
Islam El Shehaby	+100 kg	Polyanskyy (UKR); L 0000–1000	Did not advance							

Women

Athlete	Event	Round of 32	Round of 16	Quarterfinals	Semifinals	Repechage 1	Repechage 2	Repechage 3	Final / BM	
Athlete	Event	Opposition Result	Opposition Result	Opposition Result	Opposition Result	Opposition Result	Opposition Result	Opposition Result	Opposition Result	Rank
Samah Ramadan	+78 kg	Donguzashvili (RUS); L 0001–1001	Did not advance			Choi S-I (KOR); L 0000–1000	Did not advance			

== Modern pentathlon ==
Athlete	Event	Shooting (10 m air pistol)			Fencing (épée one touch)			Swimming (200 m freestyle)			Riding (show jumping)			Running (3000 m)			Total points	Final rank
Athlete	Event	Points	Rank	MP Points	Results	Rank	MP points	Time	Rank	MP points	Penalties	Rank	MP points	Time	Rank	MP Points	Total points	Final rank
Raouf Abdel	Men's	174	21	1024	13–18	=23	748	2:12.32	25	1216	140	18	1060	9:51.48	10	1036	5084	20
Aya Medany	Women's	181	4	1108	12–19	=26	720	2:21.37	13	1224	224	27	976	12:04.06	31	824	4852	28

== Rowing ==
Men

Athlete	Event	Heats		Repechage		Semifinals		Final	
Athlete	Event	Time	Rank	Time	Rank	Time	Rank	Time	Rank
Ali Ibrahim	Single sculls	7:36.60	4 R	6:59.05	2 SA/B/C	7:14.58	6 FC	6:55.34	14

Women

Athlete	Event	Heats		Repechage		Semifinals		Final	
Athlete	Event	Time	Rank	Time	Rank	Time	Rank	Time	Rank
Doaa Moussa	Single sculls	8:26.87	6 R	8:16.57	5 SC/D	8:22.45	6 FD	8:34.80	24

Qualification Legend: FA=Final A (medal); FB=Final B (non-medal); FC=Final C (non-medal); FD=Final D (non-medal); FE=Final E (non-medal); FF=Final F (non-medal); SA/B=Semifinals A/B; SC/D=Semifinals C/D; SE/F=Semifinals E/F; R=Repechage

== Shooting ==
Men

Athlete	Event	Qualification		Final	
Athlete	Event	Points	Rank	Points	Rank
Mohamed Abdellah	10 m air rifle	590	=24	Did not advance	
Amr El-Gaiar	Skeet	115	=34	Did not advance	
Mostafa Hamdy	Skeet	118	=29	Did not advance	

Women

Athlete	Event	Qualification		Final	
Athlete	Event	Points	Rank	Points	Rank
Shaimaa Abdel-Latif	10 m air rifle	388	=33	Did not advance	
Dina Hosny	10 m air rifle	391	=27	Did not advance	

== Swimming ==
Men

Athlete	Event	Heat		Semifinal		Final	
Athlete	Event	Time	Rank	Time	Rank	Time	Rank
Ahmed Hussein	100 m backstroke	56.86	31	Did not advance			
Ahmed Hussein	200 m backstroke	2:04.82	31	Did not advance			

Women

Athlete	Event	Heat		Semifinal		Final	
Athlete	Event	Time	Rank	Time	Rank	Time	Rank
Salama Ismail	100 m breaststroke	1:12.20	28	Did not advance			

== Synchronized swimming ==
Athlete	Event	Technical routine		Free routine (preliminary)			Free routine (final)		
Athlete	Event	Points	Rank	Points	Total (technical + free)	Rank	Points	Total (technical + free)	Rank
Heba Abdel Gawad; Dalia Allam	Duet	41.167	21	41.667	82.834	21	Did not advance		

== Taekwondo ==
Athlete	Event	Round of 16	Quarterfinals	Semifinals	Repechage 1	Repechage 2	Final / BM	
Athlete	Event	Opposition Result	Opposition Result	Opposition Result	Opposition Result	Opposition Result	Opposition Result	Rank
Tamer Bayoumi	Men's −58 kg	Ferreira (BRA); W 10–2	Mouroutsos (GRE); W 8–2	Chu M-Y (TPE); L 4–5	Bye	Mercedes (DOM); W WO	Ramos (ESP); W 7–1	3rd place, bronze medalist(s)
Tamer Abdelmoneim Hussein	Men's −68 kg	Huang C-H (TPE); L 1–8	Did not advance		Çalışkan (AUT); W 8–4	Song M-S (KOR); L 6–8	Did not advance	5
Jermin Anwar	Women's −49 kg	Gonda (CAN); L 2–3	Did not advance					
Abeer Essawy	Women's −57 kg	Chi S-J (TPE); L 0–8	Did not advance					

== Water polo ==
=== Men's tournament ===
Roster

The following is the Egyptian roster in the men's water polo tournament of the 2004 Summer Olympics.

Head coach: Adel Shamala

№	Name	Pos.	Height	Weight	Date of birth	2004 club
1	Amr Mohamed	GK	1.90 m (6 ft 3 in)	92 kg (203 lb)	18 February 1974	(Egypt) Gezira
2	Mohamed Gamal-el-Din (C)	CB	1.85 m (6 ft 1 in)	87 kg (192 lb)	13 April 1972	(Egypt) Heliopolis
3	Ibrahim Zaher	D	1.85 m (6 ft 1 in)	79 kg (174 lb)	7 March 1982	(Egypt) Gezira
4	Bassel Mashhour	D	1.83 m (6 ft 0 in)	80 kg (180 lb)	30 September 1982	(Egypt) Heliopolis
5	Hassan Sultan	D	1.77 m (5 ft 10 in)	74 kg (163 lb)	6 August 1983	(Egypt) Maadi
6	Sherif Khalil	D	1.85 m (6 ft 1 in)	87 kg (192 lb)	18 August 1982	(Egypt) Heliopolis
7	Karim Abdel Mohsen	CF	1.88 m (6 ft 2 in)	92 kg (203 lb)	10 January 1979	(Egypt) Heliopolis
8	Shady El-Helw	CF	1.84 m (6 ft 0 in)	88 kg (194 lb)	7 February 1979	(Egypt) Heliopolis
9	Ahmed Badr		1.85 m (6 ft 1 in)	85 kg (187 lb)	1 May 1983	(Egypt) Al Ahly
10	Mahmoud Ahmed	D	1.84 m (6 ft 0 in)	82 kg (181 lb)	1 March 1976	(Egypt) Gezira
11	Ragy Abdel Hady	D	1.86 m (6 ft 1 in)	100 kg (220 lb)	28 January 1974	(Egypt) Al Ahly
12	Omar El-Sammany	D	1.73 m (5 ft 8 in)	73 kg (161 lb)	22 August 1978	(Egypt) Al Ahly
13	Walid Rezk	CF	1.90 m (6 ft 3 in)	92 kg (203 lb)	19 July 1974	(Egypt) Al Ahly

Group play

Pos	Team	Pld	W	D	L	GF	GA	GD	Pts	Qualification
1	Greece	5	4	0	1	43	27	+16	8	Qualified for the semifinals
2	Germany	5	3	1	1	40	28	+12	7	Qualified for the quarterfinals
3	Spain	5	3	0	2	35	31	+4	6	Qualified for the quarterfinals
4	Italy	5	3	0	2	39	24	+15	6	
5	Australia	5	1	1	3	37	35	+2	4	
6	Egypt	5	0	0	5	18	67	−49	0	

15 August 2004; 09:30	Egypt	3–14	Australia	Athens Olympic Aquatic Centre; Referees: Kiszelly (HUN), Valcarce (ARG)
15 August 2004; 09:30	Score by quarters: 1-3, 0-5, 1-4, 1-2			Athens Olympic Aquatic Centre; Referees: Kiszelly (HUN), Valcarce (ARG)
15 August 2004; 09:30	3 players with 1	Goals	Miller 3	Athens Olympic Aquatic Centre; Referees: Kiszelly (HUN), Valcarce (ARG)

17 August 2004; 10:45	Germany	13–3	Egypt	Athens Olympic Aquatic Centre; Referees: Rezek (CZE), Pinker (RSA)
17 August 2004; 10:45	Score by quarters: 4-0, 5-0, 2-0, 2-3			Athens Olympic Aquatic Centre; Referees: Rezek (CZE), Pinker (RSA)
17 August 2004; 10:45	Politze 5	Goals	3 players with 1	Athens Olympic Aquatic Centre; Referees: Rezek (CZE), Pinker (RSA)

19 August 2004; 21:00	Egypt	4–15	Greece	Athens Olympic Aquatic Centre; Referees: Matache (ROU), Zhong (CHN)
19 August 2004; 21:00	Score by quarters: 0-5, 0-2, 2-3, 2-5			Athens Olympic Aquatic Centre; Referees: Matache (ROU), Zhong (CHN)
19 August 2004; 21:00	4 players with 1	Goals	Thomakos 5	Athens Olympic Aquatic Centre; Referees: Matache (ROU), Zhong (CHN)

21 August 2004; 10:45	Egypt	4–13	Italy	Athens Olympic Aquatic Centre; Referees: Rezek (CZE), Pinker (RSA)
21 August 2004; 10:45	Score by quarters: 1-3, 1-0, 2-5, 0-5			Athens Olympic Aquatic Centre; Referees: Rezek (CZE), Pinker (RSA)
21 August 2004; 10:45	El-Sammany 2	Goals	Calcaterra, Angelini 3	Athens Olympic Aquatic Centre; Referees: Rezek (CZE), Pinker (RSA)

23 August 2004; 17:00	Spain	12–4	Egypt	Athens Olympic Aquatic Centre; Referees: Valcarce (ARG), Zhong (CHN)
23 August 2004; 17:00	Score by quarters: 4-1, 3-0, 2-1, 3-2			Athens Olympic Aquatic Centre; Referees: Valcarce (ARG), Zhong (CHN)
23 August 2004; 17:00	Hernández, Gómez 3	Goals	El-Helw 2	Athens Olympic Aquatic Centre; Referees: Valcarce (ARG), Zhong (CHN)

7th-12th Classification Quarterfinal

25 August 2004; 10:45	Croatia	12–1	Egypt	Athens Olympic Aquatic Centre; Referees: Zhong (CHN), Pinker (RSA)
25 August 2004; 10:45	Score by quarters: 4-0, 2-0, 4-0, 2-1			Athens Olympic Aquatic Centre; Referees: Zhong (CHN), Pinker (RSA)
25 August 2004; 10:45	Burić 3	Goals	Rezk 1	Athens Olympic Aquatic Centre; Referees: Zhong (CHN), Pinker (RSA)

11th-12th Place Final

27 August 2004; 09:30	Kazakhstan	15–7	Egypt	Athens Olympic Aquatic Centre; Referees: Rezek (CZE), Patelli (BRA)
27 August 2004; 09:30	Score by quarters: 6-0, 1-2, 5-3, 3-2			Athens Olympic Aquatic Centre; Referees: Rezek (CZE), Patelli (BRA)
27 August 2004; 09:30	Zaitsev 7	Goals	Mashhour, Khalil 2	Athens Olympic Aquatic Centre; Referees: Rezek (CZE), Patelli (BRA)

== Weightlifting ==
Athlete	Event	Snatch		Clean & Jerk		Total	Rank
Athlete	Event	Result	Rank	Result	Rank	Total	Rank
Ahmed Saad	Men's −56 kg	102.5	13	130	11	232.5	11
Mohamed El-Tantawy	Men's −77 kg	145	=19	182.5	=15	327.5	17
Mohamed Masoud	Men's +105 kg	185	=12	220	11	405	11
Enga Mohamed	Women's −48 kg	75	=12	90	=13	165	13
Nahla Ramadan	Women's −75 kg	120	=3	~~147.5~~	DNF	120	DNF

== Wrestling ==
Key:

- VT - Victory by Fall.
- PP - Decision by Points - the loser with technical points.
- PO - Decision by Points - the loser without technical points.

Men's Greco-Roman

Athlete	Event	Elimination Pool				Quarterfinal	Semifinal	Final / BM	
Athlete	Event	Opposition Result	Opposition Result	Opposition Result	Rank	Opposition Result	Opposition Result	Opposition Result	Rank
Ashraf El-Gharably	−60 kg	Nazaryan (BUL); L 1–3 ^{PP}	Khvoshch (UKR); W 3–1 ^{PP}	—N/a	2	Did not advance			12
Mohamed Abdelfatah	−84 kg	Vakhtangadze (GEO); W 3–0 ^{PO}	Vering (USA); W 3–0 ^{PO}	—N/a	1 Q	Makaranka (BLR); L 0–3 ^{PO}	Did not advance	Avramis (GRE); L 0–5 ^{EV}	DSQ
Karam Gaber	−96 kg	Sitnik (POL); W 3–0 ^{PO}	Koutsioumpas (GRE); W 3–1 ^{PP}	Mambetov (KAZ); W 5–0 ^{VT}	1 Q	Bye	Özal (TUR); W 3–0 ^{PO}	Nozadze (GEO); W 3–1 ^{PP}	1st place, gold medalist(s)

== See also ==
- Egypt at the 2005 Mediterranean Games
