= Water polo at the 2004 Summer Olympics – Men's team rosters =

These are the rosters of all participating teams at the men's water polo tournament at the 2004 Summer Olympics in Athens.

== Pool A ==
Abbreviations
Pos.	Position	№	Cap number
CF	Centre forward	CB	Centre back
D	Defense	GK	Goalkeeper

=== Croatia ===
The following is the Croatian roster in the men's water polo tournament of the 2004 Summer Olympics.

Head coach: Zoran Roje

№	Name	Pos.	Height	Weight	Date of birth	2004 club
1	Frano Vićan	GK	1.93 m (6 ft 4 in)	92 kg (203 lb)	24 January 1976	(Italy) Sportiva Nervi
2	Damir Burić	CB	2.05 m (6 ft 9 in)	112 kg (247 lb)	2 December 1980	(Croatia) VK Primorje
3	Tihomil Vranješ	D	1.89 m (6 ft 2 in)	87 kg (192 lb)	10 November 1977	(Croatia) VK Jug Dubrovnik
4	Dubravko Šimenc	CB	2.01 m (6 ft 7 in)	115 kg (254 lb)	2 November 1966	(Italy) Bissolati Cremona
5	Goran Volarević	GK	1.89 m (6 ft 2 in)	91 kg (201 lb)	2 April 1977	(Croatia) VK Jug Dubrovnik
6	Ratko Štritof (C)	CB	1.95 m (6 ft 5 in)	102 kg (225 lb)	14 January 1972	(Italy) Circolo Nautico Posillipo
7	Mile Smodlaka	CF	1.98 m (6 ft 6 in)	115 kg (254 lb)	1 January 1976	(Croatia) VK Jug Dubrovnik
8	Danijel Premuš	CF	1.86 m (6 ft 1 in)	98 kg (216 lb)	15 April 1981	(Croatia) VK Primorje
9	Nikola Franković	D	1.92 m (6 ft 4 in)	98 kg (216 lb)	9 November 1982	(Croatia) VK Primorje
10	Samir Barač	D	1.88 m (6 ft 2 in)	93 kg (205 lb)	2 November 1973	(Italy) Leonessa Brescia
11	Igor Hinić	CF	2.02 m (6 ft 8 in)	110 kg (240 lb)	4 December 1975	(Italy) Leonessa Brescia
12	Elvis Fatović	D	1.85 m (6 ft 1 in)	87 kg (192 lb)	8 May 1971	(Croatia) VK Jug Dubrovnik
13	Vjekoslav Kobešćak	D	1.89 m (6 ft 2 in)	89 kg (196 lb)	20 January 1974	(Croatia) HAVK Mladost

=== Hungary ===
The following is the Hungarian roster in the men's water polo tournament of the 2004 Summer Olympics.

Head coach: Dénes Kemény

№	Name	Pos.	Height	Weight	Date of birth	2004 club
1	Zoltán Szécsi	GK	1.98 m (6 ft 6 in)	93 kg (205 lb)	22 December 1977	(Hungary) BVSC Vízilabda
2	Tamás Varga	CB	1.92 m (6 ft 4 in)	88 kg (194 lb)	14 July 1975	(Hungary) Vasas SC
3	Norbert Madaras	CF	1.91 m (6 ft 3 in)	87 kg (192 lb)	1 December 1979	(Hungary) Vasas SC
4	Ádám Steinmetz	CF	1.97 m (6 ft 6 in)	95 kg (209 lb)	11 August 1980	(Hungary) Vasas SC
5	Tamás Kásás	D	2.01 m (6 ft 7 in)	90 kg (200 lb)	20 July 1976	(Hungary) Vasas SC
6	Attila Vári	CB	2.00 m (6 ft 7 in)	93 kg (205 lb)	26 February 1976	(Hungary) Budapesti Honvéd SE
7	Gergely Kiss	CF	1.97 m (6 ft 6 in)	100 kg (220 lb)	21 September 1977	(Hungary) Budapesti Honvéd SE
8	Tibor Benedek (C)	CF	1.90 m (6 ft 3 in)	96 kg (212 lb)	12 July 1972	(Italy) Pro Recco
9	Rajmund Fodor	D	1.90 m (6 ft 3 in)	94 kg (207 lb)	21 February 1976	(Hungary) Budapesti Honvéd SE
10	István Gergely	GK	2.02 m (6 ft 8 in)	110 kg (240 lb)	20 August 1976	(Hungary) Budapesti Honvéd SE
11	Barnabás Steinmetz	CB	1.96 m (6 ft 5 in)	98 kg (216 lb)	6 October 1975	(Hungary) Vasas SC
12	Tamás Molnár	CF	1.95 m (6 ft 5 in)	98 kg (216 lb)	2 August 1975	(Hungary) Budapesti Honvéd SE
13	Péter Biros	CF	1.94 m (6 ft 4 in)	95 kg (209 lb)	5 April 1976	(Hungary) Budapesti Honvéd SE

=== Kazakhstan ===
The following is the Kazakh roster in the men's water polo tournament of the 2004 Summer Olympics.

Head coach: Askar Orazalinov

№	Name	Pos.	Height	Weight	Date of birth	2004 club
1	Alexandr Shvedov (C)	GK	1.97 m (6 ft 6 in)	83 kg (183 lb)	11 April 1973	(Kazakhstan) Dynamo Alma-Ata
2	Sergey Drozdov	D	1.83 m (6 ft 0 in)	81 kg (179 lb)	23 October 1969	(Russia) Sintez Kazan
3	Alexandr Gaidukov	D	1.84 m (6 ft 0 in)	90 kg (200 lb)	10 January 1974	(Russia) Spartak Volgograd
4	Sergey Gorovoy	CF	1.88 m (6 ft 2 in)	86 kg (190 lb)	6 August 1975	(Russia) Sintez Kazan
5	Alexandr Shidlovskiy	D	1.87 m (6 ft 2 in)	88 kg (194 lb)	14 July 1974	(Russia) CSK VMF Moscow
6	Ivan Zaytsev	D	1.86 m (6 ft 1 in)	88 kg (194 lb)	11 March 1975	(Russia) Dynamo Moscow
7	Alexandr Elke	CB	1.90 m (6 ft 3 in)	95 kg (209 lb)	18 January 1971	(Spain) Real Canoe NC
8	Artemiy Sevostyanov	CB	1.88 m (6 ft 2 in)	92 kg (203 lb)	2 February 1973	(Russia) Sintez Kazan
9	Yevgeniy Zhilyayev	CB	1.87 m (6 ft 2 in)	95 kg (209 lb)	13 July 1973	(Russia) Dynamo Moscow
10	Igor Zagoruyko	D	1.88 m (6 ft 2 in)	87 kg (192 lb)	31 May 1971	(Russia) Sintez Kazan
11	Yury Smolovoy	CF	1.96 m (6 ft 5 in)	118 kg (260 lb)	9 April 1970	(Russia) Spartak Volgograd
13	Alexandr Polukhin	GK	1.87 m (6 ft 2 in)	94 kg (207 lb)	15 October 1961	(Kazakhstan) Dynamo Alma-Ata

=== Russia ===
The following is the Russian roster in the men's water polo tournament of the 2004 Summer Olympics.

Head coach: Aleksandr Kabanov

№	Name	Pos.	Height	Weight	Date of birth	2004 club
1	Nikolai Maximov	GK	1.90 m (6 ft 3 in)	93 kg (205 lb)	15 November 1972	(Russia) Spartak Volgograd
2	Aleksandr Fyodorov	GK	1.95 m (6 ft 5 in)	89 kg (196 lb)	26 January 1981	(Russia) Spartak Volgograd
3	Vitaly Yurchik	CB	2.01 m (6 ft 7 in)	99 kg (218 lb)	17 May 1983	(Russia) Spartak Volgograd
4	Nikolay Kozlov	CB	1.92 m (6 ft 4 in)	92 kg (203 lb)	21 July 1972	(Russia) Spartak Volgograd
5	Roman Balashov	D	1.92 m (6 ft 4 in)	90 kg (200 lb)	9 February 1973	(Russia) Shturm 2002 Chekhov
6	Alexander Yerishev	D	1.80 m (5 ft 11 in)	82 kg (181 lb)	17 January 1973	(Russia) Dynamo Moscow
7	Revaz Tchomakhidze	CF	1.96 m (6 ft 5 in)	101 kg (223 lb)	15 December 1973	(Russia) Shturm 2002 Chekhov
8	Dmitri Stratan	D	1.96 m (6 ft 5 in)	102 kg (225 lb)	24 January 1975	(Russia) Shturm 2002 Chekhov
9	Dmitry Gorshkov (C)	D	1.80 m (5 ft 11 in)	84 kg (185 lb)	29 April 1967	(Russia) CSK VMF Moscow
10	Marat Zakirov	D	1.79 m (5 ft 10 in)	82 kg (181 lb)	8 November 1973	(Russia) Dynamo Moscow
11	Serguei Garbouzov	CB	1.92 m (6 ft 4 in)	92 kg (203 lb)	13 January 1974	(Russia) Shturm 2002 Chekhov
12	Irek Zinnourov	D	1.87 m (6 ft 2 in)	84 kg (185 lb)	11 January 1969	(Russia) Spartak Volgograd
13	Andrei Reketchinski	CF	1.90 m (6 ft 3 in)	109 kg (240 lb)	7 January 1981	(Russia) Spartak Volgograd

=== Serbia and Montenegro ===
The following is the Serbia and Montenegrin roster in the men's water polo tournament of the 2004 Summer Olympics.

Head coach: Nenad Manojlović

№	Name	Pos.	Height	Weight	Date of birth	2004 club
1	Denis Šefik	GK	2.03 m (6 ft 8 in)	96 kg (212 lb)	20 September 1976	(Serbia and Montenegro) VK Partizan
2	Petar Trbojević	D	1.97 m (6 ft 6 in)	94 kg (207 lb)	9 September 1973	(Spain) CN Atlètic-Barceloneta
3	Slobodan Nikić	CF	1.96 m (6 ft 5 in)	94 kg (207 lb)	25 January 1983	(Serbia and Montenegro) PVK Jadran
4	Vanja Udovičić	D	1.94 m (6 ft 4 in)	96 kg (212 lb)	12 September 1982	(Serbia and Montenegro) PVK Jadran
5	Dejan Savić	CB	1.94 m (6 ft 4 in)	104 kg (229 lb)	24 April 1975	(Italy) Pro Recco
6	Danilo Ikodinović	D	1.88 m (6 ft 2 in)	87 kg (192 lb)	4 October 1976	(Italy) Pro Recco
7	Viktor Jelenić	CF	2.03 m (6 ft 8 in)	104 kg (229 lb)	31 October 1970	(Italy) Rari Nantes Savona
8	Vladimir Gojković	D	1.93 m (6 ft 4 in)	91 kg (201 lb)	29 January 1982	(Serbia and Montenegro) PVK Jadran
9	Aleksandar Ćirić	D	1.94 m (6 ft 4 in)	8,891 kg (19,601 lb)	31 December 1977	(Italy) Leonessa Brescia
10	Aleksandar Šapić	D	1.91 m (6 ft 3 in)	96 kg (212 lb)	1 June 1978	(Italy) Rari Nantes Savona
11	Vladimir Vujasinović (C)	CB	1.96 m (6 ft 5 in)	91 kg (201 lb)	1 June 1978	(Italy) Pro Recco
12	Predrag Jokić	CB	1.88 m (6 ft 2 in)	81 kg (179 lb)	3 February 1983	(Serbia and Montenegro) PVK Jadran
13	Nikola Kuljača	GK	1.97 m (6 ft 6 in)	94 kg (207 lb)	16 August 1974	(Italy) Telimar Palermo

=== United States ===
The following is the American roster in the men's water polo tournament of the 2004 Summer Olympics.

Head coach: (Italy) Ratko Rudić

№	Name	Pos.	Height	Weight	Date of birth	2004 club
1	Brandon Brooks	GK	1.98 m (6 ft 6 in)	106 kg (234 lb)	April 29, 1981	(United States) Los Angeles Water Polo Club
2	Wolf Wigo (C)	D	1.87 m (6 ft 2 in)	86 kg (190 lb)	May 8, 1973	(United States) New York Athletic Club
3	Omar Amr	CB	1.80 m (5 ft 11 in)	92 kg (203 lb)	September 20, 1974	(United States) Newport Water Polo Foundation
4	Jeff Powers	CF	1.98 m (6 ft 6 in)	104 kg (229 lb)	January 21, 1980	(United States) Newport Water Polo Foundation
5	Adam Wright	D	1.90 m (6 ft 3 in)	90 kg (200 lb)	May 4, 1977	(United States) New York Athletic Club
6	Christopher Segesman	CB	1.93 m (6 ft 4 in)	92 kg (203 lb)	June 17, 1979	(United States) Los Angeles Water Polo Club
7	Layne Beaubien	CB	1.98 m (6 ft 6 in)	99 kg (218 lb)	July 4, 1976	(United States) New York Athletic Club
8	Tony Azevedo	D	1.85 m (6 ft 1 in)	87 kg (192 lb)	November 21, 1981	(United States) Long Beach Shore Aquatics
9	Dan Klatt	CB	1.95 m (6 ft 5 in)	92 kg (203 lb)	October 28, 1978	(United States) Newport Water Polo Foundation
10	Brett Ormsby	D	1.90 m (6 ft 3 in)	83 kg (183 lb)	December 1, 1982	(United States) UCLA Bruins
11	Jesse Smith	CB	1.93 m (6 ft 4 in)	108 kg (238 lb)	April 27, 1983	(United States) New York Athletic Club
12	Genai Kerr	GK	2.03 m (6 ft 8 in)	95 kg (209 lb)	December 25, 1976	(United States) Newport Water Polo Foundation
13	Ryan Bailey	CF	1.98 m (6 ft 6 in)	113 kg (249 lb)	August 28, 1975	(United States) Newport Water Polo Foundation

== Pool B ==
=== Australia ===
The following is the Australian roster in the men's water polo tournament of the 2004 Summer Olympics.

Head coach: Erkin Shagaev

№	Name	Pos.	Height	Weight	Date of birth	2004 club
1	James Stanton	GK	1.98 m (6 ft 6 in)	93 kg (205 lb)	21 July 1983	(Australia) Fremantle Mariners
2	Dean Semmens	CB	1.88 m (6 ft 2 in)	89 kg (196 lb)	22 November 1979	(Spain) CN Sant Andreu
3	Trent Franklin	D	1.84 m (6 ft 0 in)	80 kg (180 lb)	12 February 1979	(Australia) Sydney University Lions
4	Pietro Figlioli	D	1.89 m (6 ft 2 in)	89 kg (196 lb)	29 May 1984	(Spain) CN Barcelona
5	Craig Miller	D	1.91 m (6 ft 3 in)	90 kg (200 lb)	23 November 1971	(Australia) Cronulla Sharks
6	Toby Jenkins	CF	1.93 m (6 ft 4 in)	95 kg (209 lb)	26 November 1979	(Australia) Brisbane Barracudas
7	Tim Neesham	D	1.84 m (6 ft 0 in)	86 kg (190 lb)	20 October 1979	(Italy) Firenze Pallanuoto
8	Sam McGregor	CB	1.92 m (6 ft 4 in)	95 kg (209 lb)	12 August 1984	(Spain) CN Terrassa
9	Thomas Whalan	CB	1.94 m (6 ft 4 in)	89 kg (196 lb)	13 October 1980	(Spain) CN Atlètic-Barceloneta
10	Gavin Woods	CF	1.99 m (6 ft 6 in)	95 kg (209 lb)	1 March 1978	(Australia) Balmain Tigers
11	Alex Osadchuk	D	1.80 m (5 ft 11 in)	86 kg (190 lb)	19 February 1972	(Australia) Brisbane Barracudas
12	Nathan Thomas (C)	D	1.93 m (6 ft 4 in)	98 kg (216 lb)	28 August 1972	(Spain) CN Barcelona
13	Rafael Sterk	GK	1.85 m (6 ft 1 in)	85 kg (187 lb)	27 January 1978	(Australia) Brisbane Barracudas

=== Egypt ===
The following is the Egyptian roster in the men's water polo tournament of the 2004 Summer Olympics.

Head coach: Adel Shamala

№	Name	Pos.	Height	Weight	Date of birth	2004 club
1	Amr Mohamed	GK	1.90 m (6 ft 3 in)	92 kg (203 lb)	18 February 1974	(Egypt) Gezira
2	Mohamed Gamal-el-Din (C)	CB	1.85 m (6 ft 1 in)	87 kg (192 lb)	13 April 1972	(Egypt) Heliopolis
3	Ibrahim Zaher	D	1.85 m (6 ft 1 in)	79 kg (174 lb)	7 March 1982	(Egypt) Gezira
4	Bassel Mashhour	D	1.83 m (6 ft 0 in)	80 kg (180 lb)	30 September 1982	(Egypt) Heliopolis
5	Hassan Sultan	D	1.77 m (5 ft 10 in)	74 kg (163 lb)	6 August 1983	(Egypt) Maadi
6	Sherif Khalil	D	1.85 m (6 ft 1 in)	87 kg (192 lb)	18 August 1982	(Egypt) Heliopolis
7	Karim Abdel Mohsen	CF	1.88 m (6 ft 2 in)	92 kg (203 lb)	10 January 1979	(Egypt) Heliopolis
8	Shady El-Helw	CF	1.84 m (6 ft 0 in)	88 kg (194 lb)	7 February 1979	(Egypt) Heliopolis
9	Ahmed Badr		1.85 m (6 ft 1 in)	85 kg (187 lb)	1 May 1983	(Egypt) Al Ahly
10	Mahmoud Ahmed	D	1.84 m (6 ft 0 in)	82 kg (181 lb)	1 March 1976	(Egypt) Gezira
11	Ragy Abdel Hady	D	1.86 m (6 ft 1 in)	100 kg (220 lb)	28 January 1974	(Egypt) Al Ahly
12	Omar El-Sammany	D	1.73 m (5 ft 8 in)	73 kg (161 lb)	22 August 1978	(Egypt) Al Ahly
13	Walid Rezk	CF	1.90 m (6 ft 3 in)	92 kg (203 lb)	19 July 1974	(Egypt) Al Ahly

=== Germany ===
The following is the German roster in the men's water polo tournament of the 2004 Summer Olympics.

Head coach: Hagen Stamm

№	Name	Pos.	Height	Weight	Date of birth	2004 club
1	Alexander Tchigir	GK	1.91 m (6 ft 3 in)	81 kg (179 lb)	6 November 1968	(Germany) Wasserfreunde Spandau 04
2	Michael Zellmer	GK	1.90 m (6 ft 3 in)	93 kg (205 lb)	14 August 1977	(Germany) Waspo Hannover
3	Fabian Schrödter	CB	2.04 m (6 ft 8 in)	98 kg (216 lb)	11 September 1982	(Germany) Wasserfreunde Spandau 04
4	Patrick Weissinger (C)	CB	1.94 m (6 ft 4 in)	90 kg (200 lb)	2 April 1973	(Germany) Wasserfreunde Spandau 04
5	Steffen Dierolf	D	1.93 m (6 ft 4 in)	92 kg (203 lb)	5 May 1976	(Germany) SV Cannstatt
6	Marc Torsten Politze	CF	1.96 m (6 ft 5 in)	99 kg (218 lb)	20 October 1977	(Germany) Wasserfreunde Spandau 04
7	Tim Wollthan	CB	1.93 m (6 ft 4 in)	97 kg (214 lb)	29 April 1980	(Germany) SV Bayer Uerdingen 08
8	Thomas Schertwitis	CF	1.98 m (6 ft 6 in)	119 kg (262 lb)	2 September 1972	(Germany) Wasserfreunde Spandau 04
9	Tobias Kreuzmann	D	1.95 m (6 ft 5 in)	90 kg (200 lb)	15 June 1981	(Germany) ASC Duisburg
10	Heiko Nossek	D	1.86 m (6 ft 1 in)	96 kg (212 lb)	14 March 1982	(Germany) SV Cannstatt
11	Lukasz Kieloch	D	1.93 m (6 ft 4 in)	98 kg (216 lb)	15 March 1976	(Germany) SV Cannstatt
12	Sören Mackeben	D	1.93 m (6 ft 4 in)	85 kg (187 lb)	29 January 1979	(Germany) Wasserfreunde Spandau 04
13	Jens Pohlmann	D	1.80 m (5 ft 11 in)	82 kg (181 lb)	30 October 1978	(Germany) Wasserfreunde Spandau 04

=== Greece ===
The following is the Greek roster in the men's water polo tournament of the 2004 Summer Olympics.

Head coach: (Italy) Alessandro Campagna

№	Name	Pos.	Height	Weight	Date of birth	2004 club
1	Georgios Reppas	GK	1.89 m (6 ft 2 in)	86 kg (190 lb)	11 December 1974	(Greece) NC Vouliagmeni
2	Anastasios Schizas	CF	1.91 m (6 ft 3 in)	90 kg (200 lb)	18 February 1977	(Greece) Olympiacos
3	Dimitrios Mazis	CF	1.84 m (6 ft 0 in)	85 kg (187 lb)	5 September 1976	(Greece) NC Vouliagmeni
4	Konstantinos Loudis (C)	CF	1.83 m (6 ft 0 in)	85 kg (187 lb)	24 March 1969	(Greece) Panionios
5	Theodoros Chatzitheodorou	CF	1.90 m (6 ft 3 in)	100 kg (220 lb)	1 October 1976	(Greece) Olympiacos
6	Argyris Theodoropoulos	CF	1.88 m (6 ft 2 in)	89 kg (196 lb)	13 January 1981	(Greece) Olympiacos
7	Christos Afroudakis	CF	1.89 m (6 ft 2 in)	87 kg (192 lb)	23 May 1984	(Greece) NC Vouliagmeni
8	Theodoros Kalakonas	D	1.80 m (5 ft 11 in)	88 kg (194 lb)	28 October 1974	(Greece) Olympiacos
9	Georgios Afroudakis	CB	1.94 m (6 ft 4 in)	100 kg (220 lb)	17 October 1976	(Greece) NC Vouliagmeni
10	Stefanos Santa	D	1.86 m (6 ft 1 in)	94 kg (207 lb)	21 May 1975	(Greece) Panionios
11	Antonios Vlontakis	CB	1.88 m (6 ft 2 in)	92 kg (203 lb)	10 October 1975	(Greece) Ethnikos Piraeus
12	Nikolaos Deligiannis	GK	1.90 m (6 ft 3 in)	90 kg (200 lb)	3 September 1976	(Greece) Olympiacos
13	Ioannis Thomakos	CF	1.85 m (6 ft 1 in)	88 kg (194 lb)	14 March 1977	(Greece) Olympiacos

=== Italy ===
The following is the Italian roster in the men's water polo tournament of the 2004 Summer Olympics.

Head coach: Paolo de Crescenzo

№	Name	Pos.	Height	Weight	Date of birth	2004 club
1	Stefano Tempesti	GK	2.02 m (6 ft 8 in)	80 kg (180 lb)	9 June 1979	(Italy) Pro Recco
2	Francesco Postiglione	D	1.86 m (6 ft 1 in)	81 kg (179 lb)	29 April 1972	(Italy) Circolo Nautico Posillipo
3	Leonardo Binchi	CB	2.00 m (6 ft 7 in)	98 kg (216 lb)	27 August 1975	(Italy) Leonessa Brescia
4	Fabrizio Buonocore	CB	1.86 m (6 ft 1 in)	88 kg (194 lb)	28 April 1977	(Italy) Circolo Nautico Posillipo
5	Marco Gerini	GK	1.90 m (6 ft 3 in)	90 kg (200 lb)	5 August 1971	(Italy) Leonessa Brescia
6	Roberto Calcaterra	CF	1.86 m (6 ft 1 in)	90 kg (200 lb)	6 February 1972	(Italy) Leonessa Brescia
7	Goran Fiorentini	D	1.90 m (6 ft 3 in)	85 kg (187 lb)	21 November 1981	(Italy) Leonessa Brescia
8	Alberto Angelini	D	1.76 m (5 ft 9 in)	80 kg (180 lb)	28 September 1974	(Italy) Pro Recco
9	Maurizio Felugo	D	1.89 m (6 ft 2 in)	84 kg (185 lb)	4 March 1981	(Italy) Circolo Nautico Posillipo
10	Alessandro Calcaterra	CF	1.87 m (6 ft 2 in)	106 kg (234 lb)	26 May 1975	(Italy) Chiavari Nuoto
11	Bogdan Rath	D	1.80 m (5 ft 11 in)	80 kg (180 lb)	28 June 1972	(Italy) Rari Nantes Savona
12	Carlo Silipo (C)	D	1.99 m (6 ft 6 in)	95 kg (209 lb)	10 September 1971	(Italy) Circolo Nautico Posillipo
13	Fabio Bencivenga	CF	2.00 m (6 ft 7 in)	100 kg (220 lb)	20 January 1976	(Italy) Circolo Nautico Posillipo

=== Spain ===
The following is the Spanish roster in the men's water polo tournament of the 2004 Summer Olympics.

Head coach: Joan Jane

№	Name	Pos.	Height	Weight	Date of birth	2004 club
1	Jesús Rollán (C)	GK	1.87 m (6 ft 2 in)	87 kg (192 lb)	4 April 1968	(Spain) CN Sabadell
2	Ángel Andreo	GK	1.91 m (6 ft 3 in)	83 kg (183 lb)	3 December 1972	(Spain) CN Atlètic-Barceloneta
3	Sergi Pedrerol	D	1.90 m (6 ft 3 in)	78 kg (172 lb)	16 December 1969	(Spain) CN Sabadell
4	Gustavo Marcos	CB	1.80 m (5 ft 11 in)	95 kg (209 lb)	23 December 1972	(Spain) CN Sabadell
5	Guillermo Molina	CB	1.82 m (6 ft 0 in)	90 kg (200 lb)	16 March 1984	(Spain) CN Barcelona
6	Xavier García	CB	1.88 m (6 ft 2 in)	87 kg (192 lb)	5 January 1984	(Spain) CN Atlètic-Barceloneta
7	Gabriel Hernández	D	1.85 m (6 ft 1 in)	84 kg (185 lb)	2 January 1975	(Spain) CN Atlètic-Barceloneta
8	Iván Moro	CB	1.86 m (6 ft 1 in)	84 kg (185 lb)	25 December 1974	(Spain) CN Atlètic-Barceloneta
9	Daniel Ballart	CB	1.78 m (5 ft 10 in)	73 kg (161 lb)	17 March 1973	(Spain) CN Sabadell
10	Salvador Gómez	CB	1.94 m (6 ft 4 in)	96 kg (212 lb)	11 March 1968	(Spain) Aguas de Valencia
11	Iván Pérez	CF	1.90 m (6 ft 3 in)	88 kg (194 lb)	29 June 1971	(Spain) CN Barcelona
12	Javier Sánchez	CF	1.93 m (6 ft 4 in)	85 kg (187 lb)	16 June 1975	(Spain) CN Atlètic-Barceloneta
13	Daniel Moro	D	1.88 m (6 ft 2 in)	86 kg (190 lb)	8 August 1973	(Spain) CN Atlètic-Barceloneta
