= Field hockey at the 2004 Summer Olympics – Men's team squads =

Twelve national teams competed in the men's Olympic field hockey tournament at the 2004 Summer Olympics in Athens. Sixteen players were officially enrolled in each squad.

== Pool A ==
=== Egypt ===
The following is the Egyptian roster in the men's field hockey tournament of the 2004 Summer Olympics.

Head coach: Asem Gad

1. Osama Hassanein
2. Ahmed Ramadan
3. Ahmed Mandour
4. Mohamed Kasbr
5. Amro Ibrahim
6. Ahmed Mohamed
7. Yasser Mohamed (C)
8. Ahmed Ibrahim
9. Belal Enaba
10. Sameh Mohamed
12. Walid Mohamed
13. Adnan Ahmed
14. Amrou Metwalli
16. Mohamed El-Mallah (GK)
17. Mohamed El-Sayed
20. Sayed Hagag

=== Germany ===
The following is the German roster in the men's field hockey tournament of the 2004 Summer Olympics.

Head coach: Bernhard Peters

1. Clemens Arnold (GK)
2. Christian Schulte (GK)
4. Philipp Crone
6. Eike Duckwitz
7. Björn Michel
8. Sascha Reinelt
10. Christoph Eimer
11. Björn Emmerling
12. Sebastian Biederlack
14. Tibor Weißenborn
15. Florian Kunz (C)
17. Timo Weß
18. Christoph Bechmann
19. Christopher Zeller
22. Matthias Witthaus
26. Justus Scharowsky

=== Great Britain ===
The following is the British roster in the men's field hockey tournament of the 2004 Summer Olympics.

Head coach: Jason Lee

1. Simon Mason (GK)
2. Jimi Lewis (GK)
5. Rob Moore
6. Craig Parnham
7. Niall Stott
8. Tom Bertram
9. Mark Pearn
10. Jimmy Wallis
11. Brett Garrard
12. Ben Hawes
13. Danny Hall
14. Mike Johnson
17. Guy Fordham
18. Barry Middleton
19. Graham Dunlop
22. Graham Moodie

=== Pakistan ===
The following is the Pakistani roster in the men's field hockey tournament of the 2004 Summer Olympics.

Head coach: Roelant Oltmans

1. Ahmed Alam (GK)
2. Kashif Jawad
3. Mohammad Nadeem (C)
4. Ghazanfar Ali
5. Adnan Maqsood
6. Waseem Ahmed
7. Dilawar Hussain
8. Rehan Butt
9. Sohail Abbas
10. Ali Raza
11. Shabbir Muhammad
12. Salman Akbar (GK)
13. Zeeshan Ashraf
14. Mudassar Ali Khan
15. Shakeel Abbasi
16. Tariq Aziz

=== South Korea ===
The following is the South Korean roster in the men's field hockey tournament of the 2004 Summer Olympics.

Head coach: Kim Young-kyu

1. Ko Dong-sik
2. Ji Seung-hwan
5. Kim Yong-bae
6. Kang Seong-jung
7. Yeo Woon-kon
8. Kim Jung-chul
9. Song Seung-tae
10. Lim Jung-woo
11. Lee Jeong-seon
15. Han Hyung-bae
16. Kim Jong-min
19. You Hyo-sik
22. Jeon Jong-ha
23. Kim Kyung-seok
25. Jang Jong-hyun
32. Seo Jong-ho

=== Spain ===
The following is the Spanish roster in the men's field hockey tournament of the 2004 Summer Olympics.

Head coach: Maurits Hendriks

1. Bernardino Herrera (GK)
2. Santi Freixa
5. Francisco Fábregas
7. Juan Escarré
8. Alex Fábregas
9. Pablo Amat
10. Eduardo Tubau
11. Eduardo Aguilar
13. Eduardo Tubau
14. Josep Sánchez
15. Víctor Sojo
16. Xavier Ribas
17. Albert Sala
18. Rodrigo Garza
19. Javier Bruses
23. David Alegre

== Pool B ==
=== Argentina ===
The following is the Argentine roster in the men's field hockey tournament of the 2004 Summer Olympics.

Head coach: Jorge Ruiz

1. Pablo Moreira (GK)
2. Juan Pablo Hourquebie
3. Maximiliano Caldas
4. Matias Vila
5. Ezequiel Paulón
7. Mario Almada
8. Carlos Retegui
9. Rodrigo Vila
10. Tomás MacCormik
13. Jorge Lombi
14. Fernando Zylberberg
15. Germán Orozco
17. Matias Paredes
19. Juan Manuel Vivaldi
22. Lucas Rey
23. Lucas Cammareri

=== Australia ===
The following is the Australian roster in the men's field hockey tournament of the 2004 Summer Olympics.

Head coach: Barry Dancer

1. Jamie Dwyer
2. Liam de Young
4. Michael McCann
5. Troy Elder
6. Robert Hammond
7. Nathan Eglington
9. Mark Knowles
13. Michael Brennan
14. Grant Schubert
15. Bevan George
19. Mark Hickman (GK)
23. Matthew Wells
24. Travis Brooks
25. Brent Livermore
26. Dean Butler
30. Stephen Mowlam (GK)

=== India ===
The following is the Indian roster in the men's field hockey tournament of the 2004 Summer Olympics.

Head coach: Gerhard Rach

1. Devesh Chauhan (GK)
3. Dilip Tirkey
4. Sandeep Singh
6. Ignace Tirkey
7. Prabhjot Singh
8. Deepak Thakur
9. Dhanraj Pillay
10. Baljit Singh Dhillon
11. Gagan Ajit Singh
12. Adrian D'Souza (GK)
14. William Xalco
18. Viren Rasquinha
23. Arjun Halappa
24. Adam Sinclair
25. Harpal Singh
27. Vikram Pillay

=== Netherlands ===
The following is the Dutch roster in the men's field hockey tournament of the 2004 Summer Olympics.

Head coach: Terry Walsh

1. Guus Vogels (GK)
2. Rob Derikx
3. Geert-Jan Derikx
4. Erik Jazet
6. Floris Evers
7. Sander van der Weide
8. Ronald Brouwer
10. Taeke Taekema
11. Marten Eikelboom
12. Jeroen Delmee (C)
13. Klaas Veering (GK)
14. Teun de Nooijer
15. Karel Klaver
18. Rob Reckers
19. Matthijs Brouwer
22. Jesse Mahieu

=== New Zealand ===
The following is the New Zealand roster in the men's field hockey tournament of the 2004 Summer Olympics.

Head coach: Kevin Towns

1. Simon Towns (C)
2. Mitesh Patel
3. Dave Kosoof
4. Darren Smith
5. Wayne McIndoe
6. Dion Gosling
7. Blair Hopping
8. Dean Couzins
11. Umesh Parag
14. Bevan Hari
16. Paul Woolford (GK)
17. Kyle Pontifex (GK)
18. Phil Burrows
19. Hayden Shaw
20. James Nation
24. Gareth Brooks

=== South Africa ===
The following is the South African roster in the men's field hockey tournament of the 2004 Summer Olympics.

Head coach: Paul Revington

1. David Staniforth (GK)
4. Craig Jackson (c)
5. Craig Fulton
6. Bruce Jacobs
7. Gregg Clark
8. Iain Evans
9. Emile Smith
10. Jody Paul
13. Steve Evans
14. Eric Rose-Innes
18. Wayne Denne
19. Chris Hibbert (GK)
20. Ian Symons
25. Ryan Ravenscroft
26. Denzil Dolley
27. Greg Nicol
