= Kim Jong-min (disambiguation) =

Kim Jong-min (Korean: 김종민) is a Korean name. Relevant people of this name are:

- Kim Jong-min (born 1979), South Korean singer
- Kim Jong-min (footballer, born 1947), North Korean footballer
- Kim Jong-min (born 1988), stage name Go Yoon, South Korean actor
- Kim Jong-min (field hockey) (born 1980), South Korean Olympic hockey player
- Kim Jong-min (footballer, born 1965), played for FC Seoul
- Kim Jong-min (volleyballer, born 1974), retired volleyball player, manager of Korean V-League Club Gimcheon Korea Expressway Corporation Hi-pass
- Kim Jong-min (footballer, born 1992), played for Suwon Samsung Bluewings
- Kim Jong-min (footballer, born 1993), played for Busan IPark
- Kim Jong-min (politician), South Korean politician and lawmaker
