= Ahmed Ramadan =

Ahmed Ramadan can refer to:

- Ahmed Ramadan (field hockey) (born 1972), Egyptian field hockey player
- Ahmed Ramadan (footballer), Egyptian footballer
- Ahmed Ramadan (politician), Ghanaian politician
- Ahmad Ramadan, Libyan government official
