= Hady =

Hady is both a given name and a surname. Notable people with the name include:

- Hady Amr (born 1964), American government official
- Hady Camara (born 2002), French footballer
- Hady Ghandour (born 2000), English footballer
- Hady Habib (born 1998), American-born Lebanese tennis player
- Hady Kahy (born 1968), Lebanese judoka
- Hady Khashaba (born 1972), Egyptian footballer
- Hady Mirza (born 1980), Singaporean singer
- Hady Pfeiffer (1906–2002), Austrian alpine skier
- Hady Shahin (born 1986), Egyptian handball player
- Jim Hady (1930–1969), American professional wrestler
- Ragy Abdel Hady (born 1974), Egyptian water polo player
- Medhat Abdel-Hady (born 1974), Egyptian footballer
- Zain Abdul Hady (born 1956), Egyptian researcher
- Amin El Hady (born 1983), Egyptian judoka
- Abdul Hady Talukdar (1905–1985), Bangladeshi academic administrator
- Thierno Hady Boubacar Thiam (died 201), Malian Muslim scholar
- Abdel Hady Khallaf Allah (1946–2008), Egyptian boxer
- Soliman Abdel-hady Soliman, Egyptian professor
- Ibrahim Abdel Hady Pasha (1896–1981), Egyptian politician
