= Franković =

Franković is a Croatian surname. The Croatian census of 2011 listed it as one of the most common surnames in Mošćenička Draga, Labin, Raša, Istria County and Sveta Nedelja, Istria.

Notable people with the surname include:

- Mato Franković, a Croatian politician
- Valner Franković, a Croatian handball player
- Tihomir Franković, a Croatian rower
- Nikola Franković, a Croatian water polo player
- Lana Franković, a Croatian handball player
