= Karim Abdel Mohsen =

Egyptian water polo player (born 1979)

Karim
Personal information
- Nationality: Egypt
- Born: 10 January 1979 (age 47)
- Height: 1.88 m (6 ft 2 in)
- Weight: 92 kg (203 lb)

Sport
- Sport: Water polo
- Position: centre forward

Senior clubs
- Years: Team
- ?-?: Heliopolis
National team
- Years: Team
- ?-?: Egypt

Karim Abdelmohsen (كريم عبد المحسن; born 10 January 1979) is an Egyptian water polo player. He was a member of the Egypt men's national water polo team, playing as a centre forward. He was a part of the team at the 2004 Summer Olympics. On club level he played for Heliopolis in Egypt.
