= Mohamed Gamal-el-Din =

Egyptian water polo player (born 1972)

Personal information
- Nationality: Egypt
- Born: 13 April 1972 (age 54)
- Height: 1.85 m (6 ft 1 in)
- Weight: 87 kg (192 lb)

Sport
- Sport: Water polo
- Position: centre back

Senior clubs
- Years: Team
- ?-?: Heliopolis
National team
- Years: Team
- ?-?: Egypt

Mohamed Gamal-el-Din (محمد جمال الدين, born 13 April 1972) is an Egyptian male water polo player. He was a member of the Egypt men's national water polo team, playing as a centre back. He was a part of the team at the 2004 Summer Olympics as the team captain. On club level he played for Heliopolis in Egypt.
