= Ibrahim Zaher =

Egyptian water polo player (born 1982)

Personal information
- Nationality: Egyptian
- Born: 7 March 1982 (age 44)
- Height: 1.85 m (6 ft 1 in)
- Weight: 79 kg (174 lb)

Sport
- Sport: Water polo
- Position: driver

Senior clubs
- Years: Team
- ?-?: Gezira Sporting Club
National team
- Years: Team
- ?-?: Egypt

Ibrahim Zaher (ابراهيم زاهر, born 7 March 1982) is an Egyptian male water polo player. He was a member of the Egypt men's national water polo team, playing as a driver. He was a part of the team at the 2004 Summer Olympics. On club level he played for Gezira Sporting Club in Egypt.
