= Ahmed Badr =

Egyptian water polo player (born 1977)

Personal information
- Nationality: Egypt
- Born: 1 May 1977 (age 49)
- Height: 1.85 m (6 ft 1 in)
- Weight: 85 kg (187 lb)

Sport
- Sport: Water polo

Senior clubs
- Years: Team
- –: Al Ahly SC
National team
- Years: Team
- –: Egypt

Ahmed Badr (احمد بدر, born 1 May 1977) is an Egyptian male water polo player. He was a member of the Egypt men's national water polo team at the 2004 Summer Olympics. At the club level, he has played for Al Ahly SC.
