= Mahmoud Ahmed (water polo) =

Egyptian water polo player (born 1976)

Personal information
- Nationality: Egypt
- Born: 1 March 1976 (age 50)
- Height: 1.84 m (6 ft 0 in)
- Weight: 82 kg (181 lb)

Sport
- Sport: Water polo
- Position: driver

Senior clubs
- Years: Team
- ?-?: Gezira Sporting Club
National team
- Years: Team
- ?-?: Egypt

Mahmoud Ahmed (محمود احمد, born 1 March 1976) is an Egyptian male water polo player. He was a member of the Egypt men's national water polo team, playing as a driver. He was a part of the team at the 2004 Summer Olympics. On club level he played for Gezira Sporting Club in Egypt.
