= Hassan Sultan =

Egyptian water polo player (born 1983)

Personal information
- Nationality: Egypt
- Born: 6 August 1983 (age 43)
- Height: 1.77 m (5 ft 10 in)
- Weight: 74 kg (163 lb)

Sport
- Sport: Water polo
- Position: driver

Senior clubs
- Years: Team
- ?-?: Maadi
National team
- Years: Team
- ?-?: Egypt

Hassan Sultan (حسن سلطان, born 6 August 1983) is an Egyptian male water polo player. He was a member of the Egypt men's national water polo team, playing as a driver. He was a part of the team at the 2004 Summer Olympics. On club level he played for Maadi in Egypt.
