= Lukasz Kieloch =

German water polo player

Personal information
- Nationality: Germany
- Born: 15 March 1976 (age 50) Ostrowiec, Świętokrzyskie, Poland
- Height: 1.93 m (6 ft 4 in)
- Weight: 98 kg (216 lb)

Sport
- Sport: Water polo
- Position: driver

Senior clubs
- Years: Team
- ?-?: SV Cannstatt
National team
- Years: Team
- ?-?: Germany

Lukasz Kieloch (born 15 March 1976) is a Poland born German male. He was a member of the Germany men's national water polo team, playing as a driver. He was a part of the team at the 2004 Summer Olympics. On club level he played for SV Cannstatt in Germany.
