= Ragy Abdel Hady =

Egyptian water polo player (born 1974)

Personal information
- Nationality: Egypt
- Born: 28 January 1974 (age 52)
- Height: 1.86 m (6 ft 1 in)
- Weight: 100 kg (220 lb)

Sport
- Sport: Water polo
- Position: driver

Senior clubs
- Years: Team
- ?-?: Al Ahly
National team
- Years: Team
- ?-?: Egypt

Ragy Abdel Hady (راجي عبد الهادي, born 28 January 1974) is an Egyptian water polo player. He was a member of the Egypt men's national water polo team, playing as a driver. He was a part of the team at the 2004 Summer Olympics. On club level he played for Al Ahly in Egypt.
