= Mostafa Anwar =

Egyptian fencer

Personal information
- Born: 1 January 1982 (age 44)

Sport
- Sport: Fencing

Mostafa Anwar (born 1 January 1982) is an Egyptian fencer. He competed in the individual and team foil events at the 2004 Summer Olympics.
