= Amr Mohamed =

Egyptian water polo player (born 1974)

Personal information
- Nationality: Egypt
- Born: 18 February 1974 (age 52)
- Height: 1.90 m (6 ft 3 in)
- Weight: 92 kg (203 lb)

Sport
- Sport: Water polo

Senior clubs
- Years: Team
- –: Gezira Sporting Club
National team
- Years: Team
- –: EgyptNational water polo team

Amr Mohamed (عمر محمد, born 18 February 1974) is an Egyptian male water polo player. As a member of Egypt's national water polo team he competed at the 2004 Summer Olympics. At club level he played for Gezira Sporting Club in Egypt.

== See also ==
- Egypt men's Olympic water polo team records and statistics
- List of men's Olympic water polo tournament goalkeepers
