= Kim Jong-min (field hockey) =

South Korean hockey player

Personal information
- Nationality: South Korean
- Born: 15 June 1980 (age 45)

Sport
- Sport: Field hockey

Kim Jong-min (born 15 June 1980) is a South Korean field hockey player. He competed in the men's tournament at the 2004 Summer Olympics.
