= Ramy Youssef (handballer) =

Egyptian handball player

Personal information
- Full name: Ramy Mohamed Youssef
- Nationality: Egyptian
- Born: 13 March 1980 (age 45)
- Height: 180 cm (5 ft 11 in)
- Weight: 80 kg (176 lb)

Sport
- Sport: Handball

Ramy Mohamed Youssef (Arabic: رامي محمد يوسف; born 13 March 1980) is an Egyptian handball player. He competed in the men's tournament at the 2004 Summer Olympics.
