= Ahmed Ibrahim (field hockey) =

Egyptian field hockey player

Personal information
- Nationality: Egyptian
- Born: 18 June 1978 (age 47)

Sport
- Sport: Field hockey

Ahmed Ibrahim (born 18 June 1978) is an Egyptian former field hockey player. He competed in the men's tournament at the 2004 Summer Olympics.
