= Shady El-Helw =

Egyptian water polo player (born 1979)

Shady El Helw
Personal information
- Nationality: Egypt
- Born: 7 February 1979 (age 47)
- Height: 1.84 m (6 ft 0 in)
- Weight: 88 kg (194 lb)

Sport
- Sport: Water polo
- Position: centre forward

Senior clubs
- Years: Team
- ?-?: Heliopolis
National team
- Years: Team
- ?-?: Egypt

Shady El Helw (شادي الحلو, born 7 February 1979) is an Egyptian male water polo player. He was a member of the Egypt men's national water polo team, playing as a centre forward. He was a part of the team at the 2004 Summer Olympics. On club level he played for Heliopolis in Egypt.
