= Sayed Hagag =

Egyptian hockey player

Personal information
- Nationality: Egyptian
- Born: 1 January 1981 (age 45)

Sport
- Sport: Field hockey

Sayed Hagag (born 1 January 1981) is an Egyptian field hockey player. He competed in the men's tournament at the 2004 Summer Olympics.
