= Amrou Metwalli =

Egyptian field hockey player

Personal information
- Nationality: Egyptian
- Born: 7 August 1976 (age 49)

Sport
- Sport: Field hockey

Amrou Metwalli (born 7 August 1976) is an Egyptian former field hockey player. He competed in the men's tournament at the 2004 Summer Olympics.
