= Sherif Khalil =

Egyptian water polo player (born 1982)

Personal information
- Nationality: Egypt
- Born: 18 August 1982 (age 44)
- Height: 1.85 m (6 ft 1 in)
- Weight: 87 kg (192 lb)

Sport
- Sport: Water polo
- Position: driver

Senior clubs
- Years: Team
- ?-?: Heliopolis
National team
- Years: Team
- ?-?: Egypt

Sherif Khalil also written as Khalil Sherif (شريف خليل, born 18 August 1982) is an Egyptian male water polo player. He was a member of the Egypt men's national water polo team, playing as a driver. He was a part of the team at the 2004 Summer Olympics. On club level he played for Heliopolis in Egypt.
