= Walid Rezk =

Egyptian water polo player (born 1974)

Personal information
- Nationality: Egypt
- Born: 19 July 1974 (age 52)
- Height: 1.90 m (6 ft 3 in)
- Weight: 92 kg (203 lb)

Sport
- Sport: Water polo
- Position: centre forward

Senior clubs
- Years: Team
- ?-?: Al Ahly
National team
- Years: Team
- ?-?: Egypt

Walid Rezk (وليد رزق, born 19 July 1974) is an Egyptian male water polo player. He was a member of the Egypt men's national water polo team, playing as a centre forward. He was a part of the team at the 2004 Summer Olympics. On club level he played for Al Ahly in Egypt.
