= Walid Mohamed =

Egyptian hockey player

Personal information
- Nationality: Egyptian
- Born: 17 July 1977 (age 48)

Sport
- Sport: Field hockey

Walid Mohamed (born 17 July 1977) is an Egyptian field hockey player. He competed in the men's tournament at the 2004 Summer Olympics.
