= Mohamed Kasbr =

Egyptian hockey player

Personal information
- Nationality: Egyptian
- Born: 23 July 1974 (age 51)

Sport
- Sport: Field hockey

Mohamed Kasbr (born 23 July 1974) is an Egyptian former field hockey player. He competed in the men's tournament at the 2004 Summer Olympics.
