= Ahmad Ramadan =

Ahmad Ramadan is the former 'Director of Information Office of Muammar Gaddafi', until Tripoli was taken by anti-Gaddafi forces during the Libyan Civil War. He was captured by the opposition fighters and is one of the highest Gaddafi-era officials in prison. His nickname was "Black Box".

After the death of Muammar Gaddafi in October 2011, he gave information on the fate of murdered Lebanese cleric Musa Sadr, saying he was "liquidated" and naming the cleric's killers.
