= Kim Jong-min (footballer, born 1993) =

South Korean footballer

Kim Jong-Min
Personal information
- Full name: Kim Jong-Min
- Date of birth: 3 October 1993 (age 33)
- Place of birth: South Korea
- Height: 1.71 m (5 ft 7 1/2 in)
- Position: Midfielder

Team information
- Current team: Busan IPark
- Number: 28

Senior career*
Years	Team	Apps	(Gls)
2016–	Busan IPark	13	(0)
- * Club domestic league appearances and goals as of 1 November 2016

Kim Jong-Min (Korean: 김종민; born 3 October 1993) is a South Korean footballer who plays as a midfielder for Busan IPark in the K League Challenge.

== Career ==
Kim signed with Busan IPark on 30 December 2015. He made his debut for the club on 8 May 2016 in a 3–1 victory over FC Anyang.

== Club career statistics ==
As of 5 November 2016

Club performance			League		Cup		Play-offs		Total	
Season	Club	League	Apps	Goals	Apps	Goals	Apps	Goals	Apps	Goals
2016	Busan IPark	KL Challenge	13	0	2	0	0	0	15	0
Career total			13	0	2	0	0	0	15	0
