= Osama Hassanein =

Egyptian field hockey player

Personal information
- Nationality: Egyptian
- Born: 17 October 1977 (age 48)

Sport
- Sport: Field hockey

Osama Hassanein (born 17 October 1977) is an Egyptian former field hockey player. He competed in the men's tournament at the 2004 Summer Olympics.
