= Omar El-Sammany =

Egyptian water polo player (born 1978)

Personal information
- Nationality: Egypt
- Born: 22 August 1978 (age 48)
- Height: 1.73 m (5 ft 8 in)
- Weight: 73 kg (161 lb)

Sport
- Sport: Water polo
- Position: driver

Senior clubs
- Years: Team
- ?-?: Al Ahly
National team
- Years: Team
- ?-?: Egypt

Omar El Sammany (عمر السماني, born 22 August 1978) is an Egyptian male water polo player. He was a member of the Egypt men's national water polo team, playing as a driver. He was a part of the team at the 2004 Summer Olympics. On club level he played for Al Ahly in Egypt.
