= Bassel Mashhour =

Egyptian water polo player (born 1982)

Personal information
- Nationality: Egypt
- Born: 30 September 1982 (age 44)
- Height: 1.83 m (6 ft 0 in)
- Weight: 80 kg (180 lb)

Sport
- Sport: Water polo
- Position: driver

Senior clubs
- Years: Team
- ?-?: Heliopolis
National team
- Years: Team
- ?-?: Egypt

Bassel Mashhour (باسل مشهور, born 30 September 1982) is an Egyptian male water polo player. He was a member of the Egypt men's national water polo team, playing as a driver. He was a part of the team at the 2004 Summer Olympics. On club level he played for Heliopolis in Egypt.

== See also ==
- Egypt men's Olympic water polo team records and statistics
