= Mohamed Keshk =

Egyptian handball player

Personal information
- Full name: Mohamed Samir Ibrahim Keshk
- Nationality: Egyptian
- Born: 18 April 1980 (age 44); Cairo, Egypt

Sport
- Sport: Handball

Mohamed Keshk (born 18 April 1980) is a Retired Egyptian handball player. He competed in the men's tournament at the 2004 Summer Olympics.
