= Yasser Mohamed =

Egyptian field hockey player

Personal information
- Nationality: Egyptian
- Born: 15 February 1974 (age 52)

Sport
- Sport: Field hockey

Yasser Mohamed (born 15 February 1974) is an Egyptian former field hockey player. He competed in the men's tournament at the 2004 Summer Olympics.
