= Amro Ibrahim =

Egyptian field hockey player

Personal information
- Nationality: Egyptian
- Born: 19 January 1985 (age 41)

Sport
- Sport: Field hockey

Amro Ibrahim (born 19 January 1985) is an Egyptian field hockey player. He competed in the men's tournament at the 2004 Summer Olympics.
