= Tim Wollthan =

German water polo player

Personal information
- Nationality: Germany
- Born: 29 April 1980 (age 46) Krefeld, West Germany
- Height: 1.93 m (6 ft 4 in)
- Weight: 97 kg (214 lb)

Sport
- Sport: Water polo
- Position: centre back

Senior clubs
- Years: Team
- ?-?: SV Bayer Uerdingen 08
National team
- Years: Team
- ?-?: Germany

Tim Wollthan (born 29 April 1980) is a German male water polo player. He was a member of the Germany men's national water polo team, playing as a centre back. He was a part of the team at the 2004 Summer Olympics. On club level he played for SV Bayer Uerdingen 08 in Germany.
