= Mohamed El-Mallah =

Egyptian hockey player

Personal information
- Nationality: Egyptian
- Born: 23 October 1977 (age 48)

Sport
- Sport: Field hockey

Mohamed El-Mallah (born 23 October 1977) is an Egyptian field hockey player. He competed in the men's tournament at the 2004 Summer Olympics.
