= Ahmed Mohamed (field hockey) =

Egyptian field hockey player

Personal information
- Nationality: Egyptian
- Born: 8 August 1981 (age 44)

Sport
- Sport: Field hockey

Ahmed Mohamed (born 8 August 1981) is an Egyptian former field hockey player. He competed in the men's tournament at the 2004 Summer Olympics.
