= Ahmed Mandour =

Egyptian field hockey player

Personal information
- Nationality: Egyptian
- Born: 6 April 1978 (age 48)

Sport
- Sport: Field hockey

Ahmed Mandour (born 6 April 1978) is an Egyptian former field hockey player. He competed in the men's tournament at the 2004 Summer Olympics.
