= Nikola Franković =

Croatian water polo player

Nikola Frankovic
Personal information
- Nationality: Croatia
- Born: 9 November 1982 (age 43) Rijeka
- Height: 1.92 m (6 ft 4 in)
- Weight: 98 kg (216 lb)

Sport
- Sport: Water polo
- Position: driver

Senior clubs
- Years: Team
- ?-?: VK Primorje
National team
- Years: Team
- ?-?: Croatia
Medal record
Representing Croatia
European Championships
Silver medal – second place	2003 Kranj	Team competition

Nikola Franković (born 9 November 1982) is a retired Croatian male water polo player. He was a member of the Croatia men's national water polo team, playing as a driver. He was a part of the team at the 2004 Summer Olympics. On club level he played for VK Primorje and HAVK Mladost in Croatia. With Mladost, Franković won the national championship in 2008.
