= Ahmed Ramadan (field hockey) =

Egyptian field hockey player

Personal information
- Nationality: Egyptian
- Born: 15 July 1972 (age 53)

Sport
- Sport: Field hockey

Ahmed Ramadan (born 15 July 1972) is an Egyptian former field hockey player. He competed in the men's tournament at the 2004 Summer Olympics.
