= Mohamed El-Sayed (field hockey) =

Egyptian hockey player

Personal information
- Nationality: Egyptian
- Born: 29 June 1981 (age 44)

Sport
- Sport: Field hockey

Mohamed El-Sayed (born 29 June 1981) is an Egyptian field hockey player. He competed in the men's tournament at the 2004 Summer Olympics.
