= Gabriel Hernández (water polo) =

Spanish water polo player

Gabriel Hernández Paz
Personal information
- Full name: Gabriel Hernández Paz
- Nationality: Spain
- Born: 2 January 1975 (age 51) Barcelona
- Height: 1.85 m (6 ft 1 in)
- Weight: 84 kg (185 lb)

Sport
- Sport: Water polo
- Position: driver

Senior clubs
- Years: Team
- ?-?: CN Atlètic-Barceloneta
National team
- Years: Team
- ?-?: Spain

Teams coached
- ?-?: Spain
Medal record
Representing Spain
World Championships
| Gold medal – first place | 2001 Fukuoka | Team competition |
| Silver medal – second place | 1994 Rome | Team competition |
European Championships
| Bronze medal – third place | 1993 Sheffield | Team competition |

Gabriel Hernández Paz (born 2 January 1975) is a Spanish water polo coach of Pro Recco and former water polo player. He was a member of the Spain men's national water polo team, playing as a driver. He was a part of the team at the 2000 Summer Olympics and 2004 Summer Olympics. On club level he played for CN Atlètic-Barceloneta in Spain.

After his career, in 2011 he became a water polo coach, and was the coach of Spain's national team for the 2016 Summer Olympics.

== See also ==
- List of world champions in men's water polo
- List of World Aquatics Championships medalists in water polo
