= Ratko Štritof =

Croatian water polo player

Personal information
- Nationality: Croatian
- Born: 14 January 1972 (age 54) Rijeka, Croatia
- Height: 6 ft 4 3/4 in (195 cm)
- Weight: 225 lb (102 kg)

Sport
- Country: Croatia
- Sport: Water polo
Medal record
Olympic Games
Silver medal – second place	1996 Atlanta	Team

Ratko Štritof (born 14 January 1972) is a water polo player from Croatia, who was a member of the national team that won the silver medal at the 1996 Summer Olympics in Atlanta, Georgia. He was born in Rijeka. He coaches HAVK Mladost youth team lately.

== See also ==
- List of Olympic medalists in water polo (men)
