= Adnan Ahmed (field hockey) =

Egyptian field hockey player

Personal information
- Nationality: Egypt
- Born: 1 December 1977 (age 48)
- Height: 1.74 m (5 ft 9 in)
- Weight: 70 kg (150 lb)

Sport
- Sport: Field hockey

Adnan Ahmed (born 1 December 1977) is an Egyptian field hockey player. He competed in the 2004 Summer Olympics.
