= Craig Miller (water polo) =

Australian water polo player

Personal information
- Born: 23 November 1971 (age 54) Kempsey, New South Wales, Australia

Sport
- Sport: Water polo
Medal record
Representing Australia
Summer Universiade
| Bronze medal – third place | 1995 Fukuoka | Team competition |
| Bronze medal – third place | 1997 Sicily | Team competition |

Craig Miller (born 23 November 1971) is an Australian water polo player who competed in the 2000 Summer Olympics and in the 2004 Summer Olympics.
