= Marc Politze =

German water polo player

Personal information
- Full name: Marc Torsten Politze
- Nationality: German
- Born: 20 October 1977 (age 48)
- Height: 1.96 m (6 ft 5 in)
- Weight: 100 kg (220 lb)

Sport
- Sport: Water polo
- Handedness: Right
- Number: 6
National team
- Years: Team
- 2011: Germany

Marc Torsten Politze (born 20 October 1977 in Hannover) is a German male former water polo player. He was part of the Germany men's national water polo team in the 2004 Summer Olympics and in the 2008 Summer Olympics. He competed also at the 2011 World Aquatics Championships.
