= Water polo at the 2004 Summer Olympics – Men's tournament =

Coordinates: 38°2′13.5″N 23°47′2.9″E

Men's water polo at the Games of the XXVIII Olympiad

Tournament details
- Host country: Greece
- City: Athens
- Venue(s): Athens Olympic Aquatic Centre
- Dates: 15–29 August 2004
- Teams: 12 (from 5 confederations)
- Competitors: 154

Final positions
- Champions: Hungary (8th title)
- Runners-up: Serbia and Montenegro
- Third place: Russia
- Fourth place: Greece

Tournament statistics
- Matches: 44
- Multiple appearances: 5-time Olympian(s): 2; 4-time Olympian(s): 8
- Multiple medalists: 3-time medalist(s): 2
- Top scorer(s): (Serbia and Montenegro) Aleksandar Šapić (18 goals in 8 matches)
- Most saves: (Russia) Nikolay Maksimov (62 saves in 8 matches)
- Top sprinter(s): (Australia) Pietro Figlioli (24 sprints won in 8 matches)
- MVP: (Hungary) Gergely Kiss

The men's tournament of water polo at the 2004 Summer Olympics at Athens, Greece, began on August 15 and lasted until August 29, 2004.

== Preliminary round ==
All times are Eastern European Time (UTC+3)

=== Group A ===
| Pos | Team | Pld | W | D | L | GF | GA | GD | Pts | Qualification |
|---|---|---|---|---|---|---|---|---|---|---|
| 1 | Hungary | 5 | 5 | 0 | 0 | 44 | 27 | +17 | 10 | Qualified for the semifinals |
| 2 | Serbia and Montenegro | 5 | 4 | 0 | 1 | 37 | 26 | +11 | 8 | Qualified for the quarterfinals |
| 3 | Russia | 5 | 3 | 0 | 2 | 32 | 28 | +4 | 6 | Qualified for the quarterfinals |
| 4 | United States | 5 | 2 | 0 | 3 | 32 | 37 | −5 | 4 | |
| 5 | Croatia | 5 | 1 | 0 | 4 | 35 | 41 | −6 | 2 | |
| 6 | Kazakhstan | 5 | 0 | 0 | 5 | 21 | 42 | −21 | 0 | |

| 15 August 2004; 16:30 | Russia | 5–2 | Kazakhstan | Athens Olympic Aquatic Centre; Referees: Koratochvil (SVK), Koryzna (POL) |
| 15 August 2004; 16:30 | Score by quarters: 0-0, 1-0, 2-1, 2-1 | | | Athens Olympic Aquatic Centre; Referees: Koratochvil (SVK), Koryzna (POL) |
| 15 August 2004; 16:30 | Chomakhidze, Gorshkov 2 | Goals | 2 players with 1 | Athens Olympic Aquatic Centre; Referees: Koratochvil (SVK), Koryzna (POL) |

| 15 August 2004; 10:45 | Serbia and Montenegro | 4–6 | Hungary | Athens Olympic Aquatic Centre; Referees: Borrell (ESP), Petronilli (ITA) |
| 15 August 2004; 10:45 | Score by quarters: 1-0, 2-3, 1-0, 0-3 | | | Athens Olympic Aquatic Centre; Referees: Borrell (ESP), Petronilli (ITA) |
| 15 August 2004; 10:45 | Trbojević 2 | Goals | Kiss 2 | Athens Olympic Aquatic Centre; Referees: Borrell (ESP), Petronilli (ITA) |

| 15 August 2004; 22:15 | Croatia | 6–7 | United States | Athens Olympic Aquatic Centre; Referees: Tulga (TUR), Bookelman (NED) |
| 15 August 2004; 22:15 | Score by quarters: 0-0, 0-3, 2-1, 4-3 | | | Athens Olympic Aquatic Centre; Referees: Tulga (TUR), Bookelman (NED) |
| 15 August 2004; 22:15 | Štritof 3 | Goals | Azevedo 3 | Athens Olympic Aquatic Centre; Referees: Tulga (TUR), Bookelman (NED) |

| 17 August 2004; 16:30 | Kazakhstan | 6–9 | United States | Athens Olympic Aquatic Centre; Referees: Patelli (BRA), Bock (GER) |
| 17 August 2004; 16:30 | Score by quarters: 1-1, 3-4, 0-1, 2-3 | | | Athens Olympic Aquatic Centre; Referees: Patelli (BRA), Bock (GER) |
| 17 August 2004; 16:30 | Drozdov 3 | Goals | Wigo 4 | Athens Olympic Aquatic Centre; Referees: Patelli (BRA), Bock (GER) |

| 17 August 2004; 17:45 | Russia | 3–4 | Serbia and Montenegro | Athens Olympic Aquatic Centre; Referees: Tulga (TUR), Petronilli (ITA) |
| 17 August 2004; 17:45 | Score by quarters: 1-1, 1-1, 0-1, 1-1 | | | Athens Olympic Aquatic Centre; Referees: Tulga (TUR), Petronilli (ITA) |
| 17 August 2004; 17:45 | 3 players with 1 | Goals | Trbojević 2 | Athens Olympic Aquatic Centre; Referees: Tulga (TUR), Petronilli (ITA) |

| 17 August 2004; 22:15 | Hungary | 10–8 | Croatia | Athens Olympic Aquatic Centre; Referees: Borrell (ESP), Bookelman (NED) |
| 17 August 2004; 22:15 | Score by quarters: 1-0, 4-2, 4-4, 1-2 | | | Athens Olympic Aquatic Centre; Referees: Borrell (ESP), Bookelman (NED) |
| 17 August 2004; 22:15 | Kásás, Biros 3 | Goals | Burić, Štritof 2 | Athens Olympic Aquatic Centre; Referees: Borrell (ESP), Bookelman (NED) |

| 19 August 2004; 09:30 | Serbia and Montenegro | 9–5 | Kazakhstan | Athens Olympic Aquatic Centre; Referees: Legare (CAN), Sayed Mahmoud (EGY) |
| 19 August 2004; 09:30 | Score by quarters: 3-1, 2-1, 1-1, 3-2 | | | Athens Olympic Aquatic Centre; Referees: Legare (CAN), Sayed Mahmoud (EGY) |
| 19 August 2004; 09:30 | Šapić 3 | Goals | Zhilyayev 3 | Athens Olympic Aquatic Centre; Referees: Legare (CAN), Sayed Mahmoud (EGY) |

| 19 August 2004; 10:45 | United States | 5–7 | Hungary | Athens Olympic Aquatic Centre; Referees: Margeta (SLO), Tulga (TUR) |
| 19 August 2004; 10:45 | Score by quarters: 2-2, 2-3, 0-1, 1-1 | | | Athens Olympic Aquatic Centre; Referees: Margeta (SLO), Tulga (TUR) |
| 19 August 2004; 10:45 | Azevedo 2 | Goals | Varga, Madaras 2 | Athens Olympic Aquatic Centre; Referees: Margeta (SLO), Tulga (TUR) |

| 19 August 2004; 22:15 | Croatia | 8–9 | Russia | Athens Olympic Aquatic Centre; Referees: Stavropoulos (GRE), Kratochvil (SVK) |
| 19 August 2004; 22:15 | Score by quarters: 2-2, 2-3, 1-1, 3-3 | | | Athens Olympic Aquatic Centre; Referees: Stavropoulos (GRE), Kratochvil (SVK) |
| 19 August 2004; 22:15 | Franković, Fatović 2 | Goals | Zinnourov 2 | Athens Olympic Aquatic Centre; Referees: Stavropoulos (GRE), Kratochvil (SVK) |

| 21 August 2004; 09:30 | Kazakhstan | 4–14 | Hungary | Athens Olympic Aquatic Centre; Referees: Koryzna (POL), Patelli (BRA) |
| 21 August 2004; 09:30 | Score by quarters: 1-3, 0-4, 2-4, 1-3 | | | Athens Olympic Aquatic Centre; Referees: Koryzna (POL), Patelli (BRA) |
| 21 August 2004; 09:30 | 4 players with 1 | Goals | Kásás, Kiss 3 | Athens Olympic Aquatic Centre; Referees: Koryzna (POL), Patelli (BRA) |

| 21 August 2004; 21:00 | Serbia and Montenegro | 11–8 | Croatia | Athens Olympic Aquatic Centre; Referees: Petronilli (ITA), Bookelman (NED) |
| 21 August 2004; 21:00 | Score by quarters: 2-1, 4-2, 3-3, 2-2 | | | Athens Olympic Aquatic Centre; Referees: Petronilli (ITA), Bookelman (NED) |
| 21 August 2004; 21:00 | Šapić 5 | Goals | 3 players with 2 | Athens Olympic Aquatic Centre; Referees: Petronilli (ITA), Bookelman (NED) |

| 21 August 2004; 22:15 | Russia | 9–7 | United States | Athens Olympic Aquatic Centre; Referees: Borrell (ESP), Bock (GER) |
| 21 August 2004; 22:15 | Score by quarters: 3-1, 3-3, 2-0, 1-3 | | | Athens Olympic Aquatic Centre; Referees: Borrell (ESP), Bock (GER) |
| 21 August 2004; 22:15 | Eryshov, Chomakhidze 3 | Goals | Beaubien, Azevedo 2 | Athens Olympic Aquatic Centre; Referees: Borrell (ESP), Bock (GER) |

| 23 August 2004; 10:45 | Croatia | 5–4 | Kazakhstan | Athens Olympic Aquatic Centre; Referees: Matache (ROU), Rezek (CZE) |
| 23 August 2004; 10:45 | Score by quarters: 2-2, 2-0, 0-0, 1-2 | | | Athens Olympic Aquatic Centre; Referees: Matache (ROU), Rezek (CZE) |
| 23 August 2004; 10:45 | Smodlaka 2 | Goals | 4 players with 1 | Athens Olympic Aquatic Centre; Referees: Matache (ROU), Rezek (CZE) |

| 23 August 2004; 18:15 | Russia | 6–7 | Hungary | Athens Olympic Aquatic Centre; Referees: Margeta (SLO), Stavropoulos (GRE) |
| 23 August 2004; 18:15 | Score by quarters: 1-2, 1-1, 1-3, 3-1 | | | Athens Olympic Aquatic Centre; Referees: Margeta (SLO), Stavropoulos (GRE) |
| 23 August 2004; 18:15 | Eryshov, Garbuzov 2 | Goals | Kiss 2 | Athens Olympic Aquatic Centre; Referees: Margeta (SLO), Stavropoulos (GRE) |

| 23 August 2004; 21:00 | United States | 4–9 | Serbia and Montenegro | Athens Olympic Aquatic Centre; Referees: Tulga (TUR), Borrell (ESP) |
| 23 August 2004; 21:00 | Score by quarters: 1-2, 1-2, 1-3, 1-2 | | | Athens Olympic Aquatic Centre; Referees: Tulga (TUR), Borrell (ESP) |
| 23 August 2004; 21:00 | 4 players with 1 | Goals | Šapić 3 | Athens Olympic Aquatic Centre; Referees: Tulga (TUR), Borrell (ESP) |

=== Group B ===
| Pos | Team | Pld | W | D | L | GF | GA | GD | Pts | Qualification |
|---|---|---|---|---|---|---|---|---|---|---|
| 1 | Greece | 5 | 4 | 0 | 1 | 43 | 27 | +16 | 8 | Qualified for the semifinals |
| 2 | Germany | 5 | 3 | 1 | 1 | 40 | 28 | +12 | 7 | Qualified for the quarterfinals |
| 3 | Spain | 5 | 3 | 0 | 2 | 35 | 31 | +4 | 6 | Qualified for the quarterfinals |
| 4 | Italy | 5 | 3 | 0 | 2 | 39 | 24 | +15 | 6 | |
| 5 | Australia | 5 | 1 | 1 | 3 | 37 | 35 | +2 | 4 | |
| 6 | Egypt | 5 | 0 | 0 | 5 | 18 | 67 | −49 | 0 | |

| 15 August 2004; 09:30 | Egypt | 3–14 | Australia | Athens Olympic Aquatic Centre; Referees: Kiszelly (HUN), Valcarce (ARG) |
| 15 August 2004; 09:30 | Score by quarters: 1-3, 0-5, 1-4, 1-2 | | | Athens Olympic Aquatic Centre; Referees: Kiszelly (HUN), Valcarce (ARG) |
| 15 August 2004; 09:30 | 3 players with 1 | Goals | Miller 3 | Athens Olympic Aquatic Centre; Referees: Kiszelly (HUN), Valcarce (ARG) |

| 15 August 2004; 17:45 | Italy | 4–5 | Spain | Athens Olympic Aquatic Centre; Referees: Margeta (SLO), Tomic (CRO) |
| 15 August 2004; 17:45 | Score by quarters: 1-2, 1-3, 0-0, 2-0 | | | Athens Olympic Aquatic Centre; Referees: Margeta (SLO), Tomic (CRO) |
| 15 August 2004; 17:45 | 4 players with 1 | Goals | 5 players with 1 | Athens Olympic Aquatic Centre; Referees: Margeta (SLO), Tomic (CRO) |

| 15 August 2004; 21:00 | Germany | 5–4 | Greece | Athens Olympic Aquatic Centre; Referees: Brguljan (SCG), Afanasiev (RUS) |
| 15 August 2004; 21:00 | Score by quarters: 2-2, 0-1, 2-1, 1-0 | | | Athens Olympic Aquatic Centre; Referees: Brguljan (SCG), Afanasiev (RUS) |
| 15 August 2004; 21:00 | 5 players with 1 | Goals | 4 players with 1 | Athens Olympic Aquatic Centre; Referees: Brguljan (SCG), Afanasiev (RUS) |

| 17 August 2004; 09:30 | Australia | 4–8 | Italy | Athens Olympic Aquatic Centre; Referees: Tomic (CRO), Chaney (USA) |
| 17 August 2004; 09:30 | Score by quarters: 1-1, 2-2, 0-3, 1-2 | | | Athens Olympic Aquatic Centre; Referees: Tomic (CRO), Chaney (USA) |
| 17 August 2004; 09:30 | Whalan 2 | Goals | Postiglione 3 | Athens Olympic Aquatic Centre; Referees: Tomic (CRO), Chaney (USA) |

| 17 August 2004; 10:45 | Germany | 13–3 | Egypt | Athens Olympic Aquatic Centre; Referees: Rezek (CZE), Pinker (RSA) |
| 17 August 2004; 10:45 | Score by quarters: 4-0, 5-0, 2-0, 2-3 | | | Athens Olympic Aquatic Centre; Referees: Rezek (CZE), Pinker (RSA) |
| 17 August 2004; 10:45 | Politze 5 | Goals | 3 players with 1 | Athens Olympic Aquatic Centre; Referees: Rezek (CZE), Pinker (RSA) |

| 17 August 2004; 21:00 | Greece | 8–5 | Spain | Athens Olympic Aquatic Centre; Referees: Kratochvil (SVK), Margeta (SLO) |
| 17 August 2004; 21:00 | Score by quarters: 2-1, 4-1, 1-2, 1-1 | | | Athens Olympic Aquatic Centre; Referees: Kratochvil (SVK), Margeta (SLO) |
| 17 August 2004; 21:00 | Chatzitheodorou, Schizas 2 | Goals | Five players with 1 | Athens Olympic Aquatic Centre; Referees: Kratochvil (SVK), Margeta (SLO) |

| 19 August 2004; 16:30 | Spain | 8–4 | Australia | Athens Olympic Aquatic Centre; Referees: Balfanbayev (KAZ), Tomic (CRO) |
| 19 August 2004; 16:30 | Score by quarters: 2-1, 3-1, 1-1, 2-1 | | | Athens Olympic Aquatic Centre; Referees: Balfanbayev (KAZ), Tomic (CRO) |
| 19 August 2004; 16:30 | 3 players with 2 | Goals | 4 players with 1 | Athens Olympic Aquatic Centre; Referees: Balfanbayev (KAZ), Tomic (CRO) |

| 19 August 2004; 17:45 | Italy | 10–5 | Germany | Athens Olympic Aquatic Centre; Referees: Brguljan (SCG), Afanasiev (RUS) |
| 19 August 2004; 17:45 | Score by quarters: 2-0, 1-2, 3-2, 4-1 | | | Athens Olympic Aquatic Centre; Referees: Brguljan (SCG), Afanasiev (RUS) |
| 19 August 2004; 17:45 | Postiglione 4 | Goals | Nossek 3 | Athens Olympic Aquatic Centre; Referees: Brguljan (SCG), Afanasiev (RUS) |

| 19 August 2004; 21:00 | Egypt | 4–15 | Greece | Athens Olympic Aquatic Centre; Referees: Matache (ROU), Zhong (CHN) |
| 19 August 2004; 21:00 | Score by quarters: 0-5, 0-2, 2-3, 2-5 | | | Athens Olympic Aquatic Centre; Referees: Matache (ROU), Zhong (CHN) |
| 19 August 2004; 21:00 | 4 players with 1 | Goals | Thomakos 5 | Athens Olympic Aquatic Centre; Referees: Matache (ROU), Zhong (CHN) |

| 21 August 2004; 10:45 | Egypt | 4–13 | Italy | Athens Olympic Aquatic Centre; Referees: Rezek (CZE), Pinker (RSA) |
| 21 August 2004; 10:45 | Score by quarters: 1-3, 1-0, 2-5, 0-5 | | | Athens Olympic Aquatic Centre; Referees: Rezek (CZE), Pinker (RSA) |
| 21 August 2004; 10:45 | El-Sammany 2 | Goals | Calcaterra, Angelini 3 | Athens Olympic Aquatic Centre; Referees: Rezek (CZE), Pinker (RSA) |

| 21 August 2004; 16:30 | Germany | 11–5 | Spain | Athens Olympic Aquatic Centre; Referees: Tulga (TUR), Brguljan (SCG) |
| 21 August 2004; 16:30 | Score by quarters: 3-2, 2-0, 4-3, 2-0 | | | Athens Olympic Aquatic Centre; Referees: Tulga (TUR), Brguljan (SCG) |
| 21 August 2004; 16:30 | Wollthan 3 | Goals | 5 players with 1 | Athens Olympic Aquatic Centre; Referees: Tulga (TUR), Brguljan (SCG) |

| 21 August 2004; 17:45 | Greece | 10–9 | Australia | Athens Olympic Aquatic Centre; Referees: Balfanbayev (KAZ), Kiszelly (HUN) |
| 21 August 2004; 17:45 | Score by quarters: 2-2, 3-2, 3-2, 2-3 | | | Athens Olympic Aquatic Centre; Referees: Balfanbayev (KAZ), Kiszelly (HUN) |
| 21 August 2004; 17:45 | Chatzitheodorou 3 | Goals | 3 players with 2 | Athens Olympic Aquatic Centre; Referees: Balfanbayev (KAZ), Kiszelly (HUN) |

| 23 August 2004; 09:30 | Germany | 6–6 | Australia | Athens Olympic Aquatic Centre; Referees: Kratochvil (SVK), Brguljan (SCG) |
| 23 August 2004; 09:30 | Score by quarters: 1-3, 2-1, 1-0, 2-2 | | | Athens Olympic Aquatic Centre; Referees: Kratochvil (SVK), Brguljan (SCG) |
| 23 August 2004; 09:30 | Politze, Nossek 2 | Goals | Woods 3 | Athens Olympic Aquatic Centre; Referees: Kratochvil (SVK), Brguljan (SCG) |

| 23 August 2004; 17:00 | Spain | 12–4 | Egypt | Athens Olympic Aquatic Centre; Referees: Valcarce (ARG), Zhong (CHN) |
| 23 August 2004; 17:00 | Score by quarters: 4-1, 3-0, 2-1, 3-2 | | | Athens Olympic Aquatic Centre; Referees: Valcarce (ARG), Zhong (CHN) |
| 23 August 2004; 17:00 | Hernández, Gómez 3 | Goals | El-Helw 2 | Athens Olympic Aquatic Centre; Referees: Valcarce (ARG), Zhong (CHN) |

| 23 August 2004; 22:15 | Greece | 6–4 | Italy | Athens Olympic Aquatic Centre; Referees: Balfanbayev (KAZ), Bookelman (NED) |
| 23 August 2004; 22:15 | Score by quarters: 1-0, 1-2, 2-1, 2-1 | | | Athens Olympic Aquatic Centre; Referees: Balfanbayev (KAZ), Bookelman (NED) |
| 23 August 2004; 22:15 | 6 players with 1 | Goals | Bencivenga 2 | Athens Olympic Aquatic Centre; Referees: Balfanbayev (KAZ), Bookelman (NED) |

== Medal round bracket ==
Quarterfinals
B2 | Germany | 5
A3 | Russia | 12
A2 | Serbia and Montenegro | 7
B3 | Spain | 5

Semifinals
A1 | Hungary | 7
A3 | Russia | 5
B1 | Greece | 3
A2 | Serbia and Montenegro | 7
5th & 6th
5 | Germany | 6
6 | Spain | 5

Gold medal
Hungary | 8
Serbia and Montenegro | 7
Bronze medal
Russia | 6
4 | Greece | 5

9th–12th
B5 | Australia | 10
A6 | Kazakhstan | 5
A5 | Croatia | 12
B6 | Egypt | 1

7th–10th
A4 | United States | 6
B5 | Australia | 5
B4 | Italy | 11
A5 | Croatia | 7
11th & 12th
11 | Kazakhstan | 15
12 | Egypt | 7

7th & 8th
8 | United States | 9
7 | Italy | 8
9th & 10th
9 | Australia | 8
10 | Croatia | 7

== Classification 7th-12th ==
| 25 August 2004; 09:30 | Kazakhstan | 5–10 | Australia | Athens Olympic Aquatic Centre; Referees: Matache (ROU), Patelli (BRA) |
| 25 August 2004; 09:30 | Score by quarters: 2-2, 1-4, 1-3, 1-1 | | | Athens Olympic Aquatic Centre; Referees: Matache (ROU), Patelli (BRA) |
| 25 August 2004; 09:30 | Elke 2 | Goals | Figlioli, Thomas 2 | Athens Olympic Aquatic Centre; Referees: Matache (ROU), Patelli (BRA) |

| 25 August 2004; 10:45 | Croatia | 12–1 | Egypt | Athens Olympic Aquatic Centre; Referees: Zhong (CHN), Pinker (RSA) |
| 25 August 2004; 10:45 | Score by quarters: 4-0, 2-0, 4-0, 2-1 | | | Athens Olympic Aquatic Centre; Referees: Zhong (CHN), Pinker (RSA) |
| 25 August 2004; 10:45 | Burić 3 | Goals | Rezk 1 | Athens Olympic Aquatic Centre; Referees: Zhong (CHN), Pinker (RSA) |

== Quarterfinals ==
| 25 August 2004; 17:00 | Russia | 12–5 | Germany | Athens Olympic Aquatic Centre; Referees: Petronilli (ITA), Bookelman (NED) |
| 25 August 2004; 17:00 | Score by quarters: 2-1, 2-1, 5-0, 3-3 | | | Athens Olympic Aquatic Centre; Referees: Petronilli (ITA), Bookelman (NED) |
| 25 August 2004; 17:00 | 3 players with 3 | Goals | 5 players with 1 | Athens Olympic Aquatic Centre; Referees: Petronilli (ITA), Bookelman (NED) |

| 25 August 2004; 18:15 | Serbia and Montenegro | 7–5 | Spain | Athens Olympic Aquatic Centre; Referees: Tulga (TUR), Chaney (USA) |
| 25 August 2004; 18:15 | Score by quarters: 3-2, 2-0, 0-2, 2-1 | | | Athens Olympic Aquatic Centre; Referees: Tulga (TUR), Chaney (USA) |
| 25 August 2004; 18:15 | Šapić 3 | Goals | 5 players with 1 | Athens Olympic Aquatic Centre; Referees: Tulga (TUR), Chaney (USA) |

== Classification 11th-12th ==
| 27 August 2004; 09:30 | Kazakhstan | 15–7 | Egypt | Athens Olympic Aquatic Centre; Referees: Rezek (CZE), Patelli (BRA) |
| 27 August 2004; 09:30 | Score by quarters: 6-0, 1-2, 5-3, 3-2 | | | Athens Olympic Aquatic Centre; Referees: Rezek (CZE), Patelli (BRA) |
| 27 August 2004; 09:30 | Zaitsev 7 | Goals | Mashhour, Khalil 2 | Athens Olympic Aquatic Centre; Referees: Rezek (CZE), Patelli (BRA) |

== Classification 7th-10th ==
| 27 August 2004; 10:45 | United States | 6–5 | Australia | Athens Olympic Aquatic Centre; Referees: Matache (ROU), Legare (CAN) |
| 27 August 2004; 10:45 | Score by quarters: 2-0, 1-1, 2-2, 1-2 | | | Athens Olympic Aquatic Centre; Referees: Matache (ROU), Legare (CAN) |
| 27 August 2004; 10:45 | Azevedo 3 | Goals | Figlioli 3 | Athens Olympic Aquatic Centre; Referees: Matache (ROU), Legare (CAN) |

| 27 August 2004; 17:00 | Italy | 11–7 | Croatia | Athens Olympic Aquatic Centre; Referees: Afanasiev (RUS), Koryzna (POL) |
| 27 August 2004; 17:00 | Score by quarters: 2-1, 3-4, 1-1, 5-1 | | | Athens Olympic Aquatic Centre; Referees: Afanasiev (RUS), Koryzna (POL) |
| 27 August 2004; 17:00 | Bencivenga 3 | Goals | Franković 3 | Athens Olympic Aquatic Centre; Referees: Afanasiev (RUS), Koryzna (POL) |

== Semifinals ==
| 27 August 2004; 18:15 | Hungary | 7–5 | Russia | Athens Olympic Aquatic Centre; Referees: Chaney (USA), Bock (GER) |
| 27 August 2004; 18:15 | Score by quarters: 2-2, 3-3, 2-0, 0-0 | | | Athens Olympic Aquatic Centre; Referees: Chaney (USA), Bock (GER) |
| 27 August 2004; 18:15 | Kásás 3 | Goals | Garbuzov 2 | Athens Olympic Aquatic Centre; Referees: Chaney (USA), Bock (GER) |

| 27 August 2004; 21:00 | Greece | 3–7 | Serbia and Montenegro | Olympic Aquatic Centre; Referees: Petronilli (ITA), Tulga (TUR) |
| 27 August 2004; 21:00 | Score by quarters: 1-2, 1-3, 1-1, 0-1 | | | Olympic Aquatic Centre; Referees: Petronilli (ITA), Tulga (TUR) |
| 27 August 2004; 21:00 | Three players with 1 | Goals | Jokić 2 | Olympic Aquatic Centre; Referees: Petronilli (ITA), Tulga (TUR) |

== 9th place match ==
| 29 August 2004; 09:30 | Australia | 8–7 | Croatia | Athens Olympic Aquatic Centre; Referees: Kiszelly (HUN), Sayed Mahmoud (EGY) |
| 29 August 2004; 09:30 | Score by quarters: 2-0, 3-4, 1-1, 2-2 | | | Athens Olympic Aquatic Centre; Referees: Kiszelly (HUN), Sayed Mahmoud (EGY) |
| 29 August 2004; 09:30 | Whalan 5 | Goals | Franković 3 | Athens Olympic Aquatic Centre; Referees: Kiszelly (HUN), Sayed Mahmoud (EGY) |

== 7th place match ==
| 29 August 2004; 10:45 | United States | 9–8 | Italy | Athens Olympic Aquatic Centre; Referees: Afanasiev (RUS), Margeta (SLO) |
| 29 August 2004; 10:45 | Score by quarters: 2-2, 2-0, 2-3, 3-3 | | | Athens Olympic Aquatic Centre; Referees: Afanasiev (RUS), Margeta (SLO) |
| 29 August 2004; 10:45 | Azevedo, Smith 3 | Goals | Angelini 3 | Athens Olympic Aquatic Centre; Referees: Afanasiev (RUS), Margeta (SLO) |

== 5th place match ==
| 29 August 2004; 12:00 | Germany | 6–4 | Spain | Athens Olympic Aquatic Centre; Referees: Stavropoulos (GRE), Bookelman (NED) |
| 29 August 2004; 12:00 | Score by quarters: 2-2, 3-1, 0-0, 1-1 | | | Athens Olympic Aquatic Centre; Referees: Stavropoulos (GRE), Bookelman (NED) |
| 29 August 2004; 12:00 | Nossek 2 | Goals | Hernández 2 | Athens Olympic Aquatic Centre; Referees: Stavropoulos (GRE), Bookelman (NED) |

== Bronze-medal match ==
| 29 August 2004; 16:00 | Russia | 6–5 | Greece | Olympic Aquatic Centre; Referees: Borrell (ESP), Brguljan (SCG) |
| 29 August 2004; 16:00 | Score by quarters: 1-1, 3–1, 1–2, 1–1 | | | Olympic Aquatic Centre; Referees: Borrell (ESP), Brguljan (SCG) |
| 29 August 2004; 16:00 | Tchomakhidze 4 | Goals | Afroudakis 3 | Olympic Aquatic Centre; Referees: Borrell (ESP), Brguljan (SCG) |

== Gold-medal match ==
| 29 August 2004; 17:30 | Hungary | 8–7 | Serbia and Montenegro | Athens Olympic Aquatic Centre; Referees: Balfanbayev (KAZ), Petronilli (ITA) |
| 29 August 2004; 17:30 | Score by quarters: 2-3, 3-2, 0-2, 3-0 | | | Athens Olympic Aquatic Centre; Referees: Balfanbayev (KAZ), Petronilli (ITA) |
| 29 August 2004; 17:30 | Kiss 4 | Goals | Šapić 2 | Athens Olympic Aquatic Centre; Referees: Balfanbayev (KAZ), Petronilli (ITA) |

== Ranking and statistics ==
=== Final rankings ===
| Rank | Team |
|---|---|
| Gold medal | Hungary |
| Silver medal | Serbia and Montenegro |
| Bronze medal | Russia |
| 4. | Greece |
| 5. | Germany |
| 6. | Spain |
| 7. | United States |
| 8. | Italy |
| 9. | Australia |
| 10. | Croatia |
| 11. | Kazakhstan |
| 12. | Egypt |

2004 Men's Olympic champions

Hungary
Eighth title

=== Multi-time Olympians ===
Five-time Olympian(s): 2 players

- Spain: Salvador Gómez, Jesús Rollán (GK)

Four-time Olympian(s): 8 players

- Croatia: Dubravko Šimenc
- Greece: Konstantinos Loudis
- Hungary: Tibor Benedek
- Italy: Carlo Silipo
- Russia: Dmitry Gorshkov, Nikolay Kozlov
- Spain: Daniel Ballart, Sergi Pedrerol

=== Multiple medalists ===
Three-time Olympic medalist(s): 2 players

- Russia: Dmitry Gorshkov, Nikolay Kozlov

=== Leading goalscorers ===
| Rank | Player | Team | Goals | Matches played | Goals per match | Shots | % |
|---|---|---|---|---|---|---|---|
| 1 | Aleksandar Šapić | Serbia and Montenegro | 18 | 8 | 2.250 | 54 | 33.3% |
| 2 | Tony Azevedo | United States | 15 | 7 | 2.143 | 31 | 48.4% |
| 2 | Revaz Chomakhidze | Russia | 15 | 8 | 1.875 | 25 | 60.0% |
| 4 | Tamás Kásás | Hungary | 14 | 7 | 2.000 | 30 | 46.7% |
| 4 | Gergely Kiss | Hungary | 14 | 7 | 2.000 | 31 | 45.2% |
| 4 | Thomas Whalan | Australia | 14 | 8 | 1.750 | 36 | 38.9% |
| 7 | Nikola Franković | Croatia | 12 | 8 | 1.500 | 27 | 44.4% |
| 7 | Heiko Nossek | Germany | 12 | 7 | 1.714 | 28 | 42.9% |
| 7 | Marc Politze | Germany | 12 | 7 | 1.714 | 33 | 36.4% |
| 10 | Alberto Angelini | Italy | 11 | 7 | 1.571 | 32 | 34.4% |
| 10 | Elvis Fatović | Croatia | 11 | 8 | 1.375 | 26 | 42.3% |
| 10 | Ratko Štritof | Croatia | 11 | 8 | 1.375 | 32 | 34.4% |
| 10 | Ivan Zaitsev | Kazakhstan | 11 | 7 | 1.571 | 22 | 50.0% |

Source: Official Results Book (page 184)

=== Leading goalkeepers ===
| Rank | Goalkeeper | Team | Saves | Matches played | Saves per match | Shots | % |
|---|---|---|---|---|---|---|---|
| 1 | Nikolay Maksimov | Russia | 62 | 8 | 7.750 | 104 | 59.6% |
| 2 | Denis Šefik | Serbia and Montenegro | 60 | 8 | 7.500 | 102 | 58.8% |
| 3 | Brandon Brooks | United States | 58 | 7 | 8.286 | 108 | 53.7% |
| 4 | James Stanton | Australia | 57 | 8 | 7.125 | 108 | 52.8% |
| 5 | Alexandr Shvedov | Kazakhstan | 54 | 7 | 7.714 | 111 | 48.6% |
| 6 | Ángel Andreo | Spain | 50 | 7 | 7.143 | 92 | 54.3% |
| 6 | Stefano Tempesti | Italy | 50 | 7 | 7.143 | 86 | 58.1% |
| 8 | Amr Mohamed | Egypt | 41 | 7 | 5.857 | 135 | 30.4% |
| 8 | Frano Vićan | Croatia | 41 | 8 | 5.125 | 81 | 50.6% |
| 10 | Zoltán Szécsi | Hungary | 40 | 7 | 5.714 | 75 | 53.3% |

Source: Official Results Book (page 180)

=== Leading sprinters ===
| Rank | Sprinter | Team | Sprints won | Matches played | Sprints won per match | Sprints contested | % |
|---|---|---|---|---|---|---|---|
| 1 | Pietro Figlioli | Australia | 24 | 8 | 3.000 | 27 | 88.9% |
| 2 | Sergey Garbuzov | Russia | 20 | 8 | 2.500 | 21 | 95.2% |
| 3 | Tobias Kreuzmann | Germany | 17 | 7 | 2.429 | 22 | 77.3% |
| 4 | Goran Fiorentini | Italy | 15 | 7 | 2.143 | 22 | 68.2% |
| 5 | Aleksandar Ćirić | Serbia and Montenegro | 14 | 8 | 1.750 | 20 | 70.0% |
| 6 | Tihomil Vranješ | Croatia | 9 | 8 | 1.125 | 24 | 37.5% |
| 7 | Tamás Kásás | Hungary | 7 | 7 | 1.000 | 9 | 77.8% |
| 8 | Christos Afroudakis | Greece | 6 | 7 | 0.857 | 15 | 40.0% |
| 8 | Tony Azevedo | United States | 6 | 7 | 0.857 | 10 | 60.0% |

Source: Official Results Book (page 183)

== Awards ==
The men's all-star team was announced on 29 August 2004.

Most Valuable Player

- (Hungary) Gergely Kiss (left-handed, 14 goals)

Media All-Star Team

- Goalkeeper
  - (Serbia and Montenegro) Denis Šefik (60 saves)
- Field players
  - (Greece) Theodoros Chatzitheodorou (8 goals)
  - (Russia) Revaz Chomakhidze (centre forward, 15 goals)
  - (Hungary) Tamás Kásás (14 goals, 7 sprints won)
  - (Hungary) Gergely Kiss (left-handed, 14 goals)
  - (Serbia and Montenegro) Aleksandar Šapić (18 goals)
  - (Serbia and Montenegro) Vladimir Vujasinović (centre back, 3 goals)

== Sources ==
- PDF documents in the LA84 Foundation Digital Library:
  - Official Results Book – 2004 Olympic Games – Water Polo (download, archive)
- Water polo on the Olympedia website
  - Water polo at the 2004 Summer Olympics (men's tournament)
- Water polo on the Sports Reference website
  - Water polo at the 2004 Summer Games (men's tournament) (archived)
