= Field hockey at the 2004 Summer Olympics – Men's tournament =

Men's field hockey at the 2004 Summer Olympics
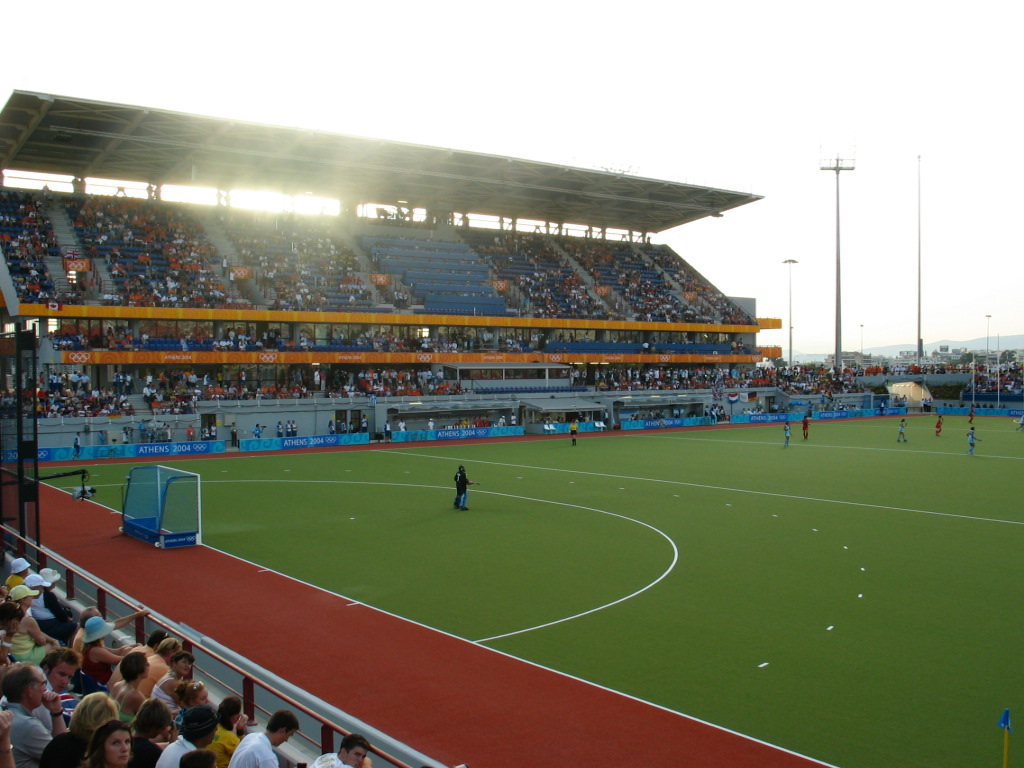
- Helliniko Olympic Complex

Tournament details
- Host country: Greece
- City: Athens
- Dates: 15 – 27 August
- Teams: 12
- Venue: Hellinikon Olympic Hockey Centre

Final positions
- Champions: Australia (1st title)
- Runner-up: Netherlands
- Third place: Germany

Tournament statistics
- Matches played: 42
- Goals scored: 213 (5.07 per match)
- Top scorer: (Pakistan) Sohail Abbas (11 goals)

The men's field hockey tournament at the 2004 Summer Olympics was the 20th edition of the field hockey event for men at the Summer Olympic Games. It was held over a thirteen-day period beginning on 15 August, and culminating with the medal finals on 27 August. All games were played at the hockey centre within the Hellinikon Olympic Complex in Athens, Greece.

Australia won the gold medal for the first time after defeating defending champions the Netherlands 2–1 in the final. Germany won the bronze medal by defeating Spain 4–3. Pakistan's Sohail Abbas was the top scorer of the tournament, netting 11 goals.

== Qualification ==
Each of the continental champions from five federations received an automatic berth. Alongside the seven teams qualifying through the 2004 Men's Field Hockey Olympic Qualification Tournament, twelve teams competed in this tournament.

Dates	Event	Location	Qualifier(s)
30 September – 12 October 2002	2002 Asian Games	Busan, South Korea	South Korea
2–13 August 2003	2003 Pan American Games	Santo Domingo, Dominican Republic	Argentina
1–13 September 2003	2003 EuroHockey Nations Championship	Barcelona, Spain	Germany
17–21 September 2003	2003 Men's Oceania Cup	Christchurch and Wellington, New Zealand	Australia
10–16 October 2003	2003 All-Africa Games	Abuja, Nigeria	Egypt
2–13 March 2004	Olympic Qualification Tournament	Madrid, Spain	Netherlands; Spain; Pakistan; India; Great Britain; New Zealand; South Africa

Although the host nation would have qualified automatically as well, the International Hockey Federation (FIH) and the International Olympic Committee (IOC) refused to give them an automatic berth due to the standard of hockey in Greece. Greece appealed the decision to the Court of Arbitration for Sport (CAS), however it was turned down. Greece's first option to gain a place at the Olympics was by qualifying for the EuroHockey Nations Championship held in 2003. As they did not qualify for this tournament their last option was to beat Canada, the last ranked team of the Olympic Qualification Tournament in a best of three play-off competition. Canada would have kept its place in the Qualifier regardless of whether it won or lost against Greece. There would, however, have been six places at stake at the tournament if Greece had qualified, rather than the seven eventually available. Greece lost the first two matches against Canada 1–7 and 1–3, losing their chance to qualify to the Olympics.

== Umpires ==
- Xavier Adell (ESP)
- Henrik Ehlers (DEN)
- David Gentles (AUS)
- Han Jin-Soo (KOR)
- David Leiper (GBR)
- Ray O'Connor (IRL)
- Amarjit Singh (MAS)
- John Wright (RSA)
- Christian Blasch (GER)
- Peter Elders (NED)
- Murray Grime (AUS)
- Satinder Kumar (IND)
- Jason McCracken (NZL)
- Sumesh Putra (CAN)
- Pedro Teixeira (POR)

== Preliminary round ==
All times are Eastern European Time (UTC+2)

=== Pool A ===
Pos	Team	Pld	W	D	L	GF	GA	GD	Pts	Qualification
1	Spain	5	3	2	0	14	3	+11	11	Semi-finals
2	Germany	5	3	2	0	15	6	+9	11	Semi-finals
3	Pakistan	5	3	0	2	19	8	+11	9	5–8th place semi-finals
4	South Korea	5	2	2	1	17	8	+9	8	5–8th place semi-finals
5	Great Britain	5	1	0	4	9	21	−12	3	9–12th place semi-finals
6	Egypt	5	0	0	5	2	30	−28	0	9–12th place semi-finals

Source: FIH

15 August 2004
18:00

South Korea	1 – 1	Spain
You Hyo-Sik 16'	Report	Freixa 43'

Umpires:
Sumesh Putra (CAN)
Peter Elders (NED)

15 August 2004
18:30

Germany	2 – 1	Pakistan
Emmerling 7'; Michel 31'	Report	Butt 43'

Umpires:
Ray O'Connor (IRL)
John Wright (RSA)

15 August 2004
20:00

Great Britain	3 – 1	Egypt
Middleton 18'; Fordham 53'; Hawes 59'	Report	S. Mohamed 37'

Umpires:
Henrik Ehlers (DEN)
Satinder Kumar (IND)

17 August 2004
08:30

South Korea	3 – 2	Great Britain
Lee Jung-Seon 15', 68'; Yeo Woon-Kon 47'	Report	Hall 45'; Stott 52'

Umpires:
Pedro Teixeira (POR)
John Wright (RSA)

17 August 2004
18:30

Egypt	0 – 7	Pakistan
	Report	Jawad 3', 12'; Nadeem 15'; Abbas 30', 34', 38', 58'

Umpires:
Han Jin-Soo (KOR)
Peter Elders (NED)

17 August 2004
20:30

Spain	1 – 1	Germany
Freixa 28'	Report	Bechmann 64'

Umpires:
Henrik Ehlers (DEN)
Murray Grime (AUS)

19 August 2004
10:30

Pakistan	3 – 0	South Korea
Butt 43'; Abbasi 56'; Abbas 66'	Report

Umpires:
Ray O'Connor (IRL)
Amarjit Singh (MAS)

19 August 2004
18:00

Germany	6 – 1	Egypt
Zeller 17', 67'; Witthaus 38'; Kunz 46'; Bechmann 49', 58'	Report	Enaba 24'

Umpires:
Xavier Adell (ESP)
David Gentles (AUS)

19 August 2004
18:30

Great Britain	1 – 5	Spain
Middleton 57'	Report	Amat 7', 38'; Freixa 32', 35'; Ribas 61'

Umpires:
Satinder Kumar (IND)
Christian Blasch (GER)

21 August 2004
08:30

Egypt	0 – 11	South Korea
	Report	Lee Jung-Seon 16', 25', 37', 59', 68'; Jeon Jong-Ha 29'; Seo Jong-Ho 57'; Song Seung-Tae 62', 65', 65'; You Hyo-Sik 66'

Umpires:
Padro Teixeira (POR)
Christian Blasch (GER)

21 August 2004
20:00

Spain	4 – 0	Pakistan
Tubau 6', 35', 41'; Freixa 63'	Report

Umpires:
Peter Elders (NED)
John Wright (RSA)

21 August 2004
20:30

Germany	4 – 1	Great Britain
Zeller 21', 39'; Witthaus 38'; Scharowsky 52'	Report	Moodie 60'

Umpires:
Jason McCracken (NZL)
Sumesh Putra (CAN)

23 August 2004
10:30

Spain	3 – 0	Egypt
Tubau 6', 65'; Amat 62'	Report

Umpires:
David Leiper (GBR)
Han Jin-Soo (KOR)

23 August 2004
18:00

Pakistan	8 – 2	Great Britain
Abbas 9', 39'; Ali 35+'; Nadeem 37'; Butt 55', 68'; Abbasi 59'; Shabbir 60'	Report	Stott 5'; Hall 65'

Umpires:
Murray Grime (AUS)
Ray O'Connor (IRL)

23 August 2004
18:30

South Korea	2 – 2	Germany
Lee Jung-Seon 8', 54'	Report	Zeller 35'; Emmerling 66'

Umpires:
Henrik Ehlers (DEN)
John Wright (RSA)

=== Pool B ===
Pos	Team	Pld	W	D	L	GF	GA	GD	Pts	Qualification
1	Netherlands	5	5	0	0	16	9	+7	15	Semi-finals
2	Australia	5	3	1	1	14	10	+4	10	Semi-finals
3	New Zealand	5	3	0	2	13	11	+2	9	5–8th place semi-finals
4	India	5	1	1	3	11	13	−2	4	5–8th place semi-finals
5	South Africa	5	1	0	4	9	15	−6	3	9–12th place semi-finals
6	Argentina	5	0	2	3	8	13	−5	2	9–12th place semi-finals

Source: FIH

15 August 2004
08:30

Australia	4 – 1	New Zealand
Elder 15'; Dwyer 24', 42', 60'	Report	Smith 58'

Umpires:
David Leiper (GBR)
Amarjit Singh (MAS)

15 August 2004
10:30

Argentina	1 – 2	South Africa
Almada 10'	Report	Nicol 38', 41'

Umpires:
Xavier Adell (ESP)
David Gentles (AUS)

15 August 2004
20:30

Netherlands	3 – 1	India
Eikelboom 2'; De Nooijer 50'; Taekema 54'	Report	G. A. Singh 69'

Umpires:
Murray Grime (AUS)
Jason McCracken (NZL)

17 August 2004
10:30

Argentina	2 – 2	Australia
Almada 2', 31'	Report	Dwyer 26', 66'

Umpires:
Christian Blasch (GER)
Jason McCracken (NZL)

17 August 2004
18:00

South Africa	2 – 4	India
Nicol 7'; Fulton 12'	Report	D. Pillay 27'; B. Singh 41'; D. Tirkey 69'; G. A. Singh 70'

Umpires:
Ray O'Connor (IRL)
David Leiper (GBR)

17 August 2004
20:00

New Zealand	3 – 4	Netherlands
Shaw 9', 55'; Burrows 59'	Report	Taekema 4', 24'; Klaver 39'; Van der Weide 68'

Umpires:
David Gentles (AUS)
Sumesh Putra (CAN)

19 August 2004
08:30

Netherlands	3 – 2	South Africa
Derikx 29'; De Nooijer 49'; Klaver 69'	Report	Evans 17'; Symons 23'

Umpires:
Jason McCracken (NZL)
Han Jin-Soo (KOR)

19 August 2004
20:00

New Zealand	3 – 1	Argentina
Shaw 12'; Hari 44'; Burrows 49'	Report	Lombi 8'

Umpires:
David Leiper (GBR)
Pedro Teixeira (POR)

19 August 2004
20:30

Australia	4 – 3	India
Elder 11'; Dwyer 38'; McCann 49'; Brennan 70'	Report	Thakur 6'; G. A. Singh 50'; Halappa 52'

Umpires:
Henrik Ehlers (DEN)
John Wright (RSA)

21 August 2004
10:30

India	1 – 2	New Zealand
D. Pillay 62'	Report	Burrows 36'; Shaw 70+'

Umpires:
Ray O'Connor (IRL)
Xavier Adell (ESP)

21 August 2004
18:00

South Africa	2 – 3	Australia
Nicol 4'; Smith 29'	Report	Brooks 17'; Eglington 19'; Brennan 47'

Umpires:
Henrik Ehlers (DEN)
Satinder Kumar (IND)

21 August 2004
18:30

Argentina	2 – 4	Netherlands
Almada 37'; Lombi 52'	Report	Reckers 17'; Klaver 22'; Taekema 26'; De Nooijer 44'

Umpires:
Amarjit Singh (MAS)
Murray Grime (AUS)

23 August 2004
08:30

New Zealand	4 – 1	South Africa
Kosoof 15'; Shaw 38', 46'; Burrows 70'	Report	Smith 28'

Umpires:
Christian Blasch (GER)
Sumesh Putra (CAN)

23 August 2004
20:00

India	2 – 2	Argentina
G. A. Singh 33', 60'	Report	Vila 52', 69'

Umpires:
David Gentles (AUS)
Peter Elders (NED)

23 August 2004
20:30

Australia	1 – 2	Netherlands
Brooks 28'	Report	Taekema 10', 13'

Umpires:
Xavier Adell (ESP)
Amarjit Singh (MAS)

== Classification round ==
=== Ninth to twelfth place classification ===
9–12th place semi-finals
25 August
South Africa	5
Egypt	1
25 August
Great Britain	4
Argentina	1

Ninth place
27 August
South Africa	1 (3)
Great Britain (p.s.)	1 (4)
Eleventh place
27 August
Egypt	2
Argentina	4

==== 9–12th place semi-finals ====
25 August 2004
08:30

South Africa	5 – 1	Egypt
Nicol 2', 54', 67'; Fulton 7'; Smith 50'	Report	Ahmed 17'

Umpires:
Pedro Teixeira (POR)
Satinder Kumar (IND)

25 August 2004
11:00

Great Britain	4 – 1	Argentina
Moore 24'; Bertram 35+'; Hall 38'; Pearn 67'	Report	Retegui 64'

Umpires:
Jason McCracken (NZL)
Christian Blasch (GER)

==== Eleventh place game ====
27 August 2004
09:00

Egypt	2 – 4	Argentina
El Sayed 21'; Mohamed 43'	Report	Retegui 20'; Almada 26', 48', 62'

Umpires:
Xavier Adell (ESP)
Han Jin-Soo (KOR)

==== Ninth place game ====
27 August 2004
11:30

South Africa	1 – 1 (a.e.t.)	Great Britain
Nicol 45'	Report	Fordham 43'
Penalties
Symons (penalty shoot-out scored); Clark (penalty shoot-out scored); Nicol (penalty shoot-out scored); Denne (penalty shoot-out missed); Fulton (penalty shoot-out missed)	3 – 4	(penalty shoot-out scored) Hawes; (penalty shoot-out scored) Moodie; (penalty shoot-out missed) Stott; (penalty shoot-out scored) Garrard; (penalty shoot-out scored) Hall

Umpires:
David Gentles (AUS)
Amarjit Singh (MAS)

=== Fifth to eighth place classification ===
Crossover
25 August
New Zealand	4
South Korea	3
25 August
Pakistan	3
India	0

Fifth Place
27 August
New Zealand	2
Pakistan	4
Seventh Place
27 August
South Korea	2
India	5

==== Crossover ====
25 August 2004
18:00

New Zealand	4–3	South Korea
Burrows 26', 62', 69'; McIndoe 28'	Report	Yeo 14'; Lee 39'; Jeon 57'

Umpires:
Peter Elders (NED)
Xavier Adell (ESP)

25 August 2004
20:30

Pakistan	3–0	India
Aziz 43'; Abbas 59'; Shabbir 68'	Report

Umpires:
David Leiper (GBR)
Amarjit Singh (MAS)

==== Seventh place match ====
27 August 2004
08:30

South Korea	2–5	India
Ji 57'; Kang 58'	Report	Gagan 4', 11'; V. Pillay 15'; Prabhjot 32'; Sinclair 68'

Umpires:
Jason McCracken (NZL)
Peter Elders (NED)

==== Fifth place match ====
27 August 2004
11:00

New Zealand	2–4	Pakistan
Brooks 16'; Smith 35'	Report	Abbas 35', 47', 68'; Jawwad 55'

Umpires:
Sumesh Putra (CAN)
David Leiper (GBR)

=== Medal round ===
Semi-finals
25 August
Netherlands	3
Germany	2
25 August
Spain	3
Australia	6

Gold medal match
27 August
Netherlands	1
Australia (a.e.t.)	2
Bronze medal match
27 August
Germany (a.e.t.)	4
Spain	3

==== Semi-finals ====
25 August 2004
18:30

Netherlands	3–2	Germany
Taekema 5'; Eikelboom 47'; De Nooijer 52'	Report	Witthaus 3'; Bechmann 58'

Umpires:
Murray Grime (AUS)
Raymond O'Connor (IRL)

25 August 2004
21:00

Spain	3–6	Australia
Tubau 8'; Ribas 49', 67'	Report	Elder 3'; McCann 23', 44'; Wells 27'; Schubert 51', 53'

Umpires:
Jonathan Wright (RSA)
Henrik Ehlers (DEN)

==== Bronze medal match ====
27 August 2004
18:00

Germany	4–3 (a.e.t.)	Spain
Reinelt 22'; Duckwitz 45'; Emmerling 49'; Michel 80'	Report	Freixa 31'; Tubau 39', 47'

Umpires:
Murray Grime (AUS)
Henrik Ehlers (DEN)

==== Gold medal match ====
27 August 2004
20:30

Netherlands	1–2 (a.e.t.)	Australia
R. Brouwer 29'	Report	Brooks 37'; Dwyer 78'

Umpires:
Raymond O'Connor (IRL)
Jonathan Wright (RSA)

== Final ranking ==
As per statistical convention in field hockey, matches decided in regular time are counted as wins and losses, while matches decided by penalty shoot-outs are counted as draws.

Pos	Team	Pld	W	D	L	GF	GA	GD	Pts	Final result
1st place, gold medalist(s)	Australia	7	5	1	1	22	14	+8	16	Gold Medal
2nd place, silver medalist(s)	Netherlands	7	6	0	1	20	13	+7	18	Silver Medal
3rd place, bronze medalist(s)	Germany	7	4	2	1	21	12	+9	14	Bronze Medal
4	Spain	7	3	2	2	20	13	+7	11	Fourth place
5	Pakistan	7	5	0	2	26	10	+16	15	Eliminated in group stage
6	New Zealand	7	4	0	3	19	18	+1	12	Eliminated in group stage
7	India	7	2	1	4	16	18	−2	7	Eliminated in group stage
8	South Korea	7	2	2	3	22	17	+5	8	Eliminated in group stage
9	Great Britain	7	2	1	4	14	23	−9	7	Eliminated in group stage
10	South Africa	7	2	1	4	15	17	−2	7	Eliminated in group stage
11	Argentina	7	1	2	4	13	19	−6	5	Eliminated in group stage
12	Egypt	7	0	0	7	5	39	−34	0	Eliminated in group stage

Source: FIH

== Goalscorers ==
There were 213 goals scored in 42 matches, for an average of 5.07 goals per match.

11 goals

- (Pakistan) Sohail Abbas

10 goals

- (South Korea) Lee Jung-Seon

8 goals

- (South Africa) Gregory Nicol
- (Spain) Eduardo Tubau

7 goals

- (Argentina) Mario Almada
- (Australia) Jamie Dwyer
- (India) Gagan Ajit Singh
- (Netherlands) Taeke Taekema
- (New Zealand) Phil Burrows

6 goals

- (New Zealand) Hayden Shaw
- (Spain) Santiago Freixa

5 goals

- (Germany) Christopher Zeller

4 goals

- (Germany) Christoph Bechmann
- (Netherlands) Teun de Nooijer
- (Pakistan) Rehan Butt

3 goals

- (Australia) Travis Brooks
- (Australia) Troy Elder
- (Australia) Michael McCann
- (Germany) Björn Emmerling
- (Germany) Matthias Witthaus
- (United Kingdom) Daniel Hall
- (Netherlands) Karel Klaver
- (Pakistan) Kashif Jawwad
- (South Africa) Emile Smith
- (South Korea) Song Seung-Tae
- (Spain) Pol Amat
- (Spain) Xavier Ribas

2 goals

- (Argentina) Jorge Lombi
- (Argentina) Carlos Retegui
- (Argentina) Matías Vila
- (Australia) Michael Brennan
- (Australia) Grant Schubert
- (Egypt) Sameh Mohamed
- (Germany) Björn Michel
- (United Kingdom) Guy Fordham
- (United Kingdom) Barry Middleton
- (United Kingdom) Niall Stott
- (India) Dhanraj Pillay
- (Netherlands) Marten Eikelboom
- (New Zealand) Darren Smith
- (Pakistan) Shakeel Abbasi
- (Pakistan) Muhammad Nadeem
- (Pakistan) Muhammad Shabbir
- (South Africa) Craig Fulton
- (South Korea) You Hyo-Sik
- (South Korea) Jeon Jong-Ha
- (South Korea) Yeo Woon-Kon

1 goal

- (Australia) Nathan Eglington
- (Australia) Matthew Wells
- (Egypt) Adnan Ahmed
- (Egypt) Belal Enaba
- (Egypt) Mohamed el Sayed
- (Germany) Eike Duckwitz
- (Germany) Florian Kunz
- (Germany) Sascha Reinelt
- (Germany) Justus Scharowsky
- (United Kingdom) Thomas Bertram
- (United Kingdom) Benjamin Hawes
- (United Kingdom) Graham Moodie
- (United Kingdom) Robert Moore
- (United Kingdom) Mark Pearn
- (India) Arjun Halappa
- (India) Vikram Pillay
- (India) Adam Sinclair
- (India) Baljit Singh Dhillon
- (India) Prabhjot Singh
- (India) Deepak Thakur
- (India) Dilip Tirkey
- (Netherlands) Ronald Brouwer
- (Netherlands) Geert-Jan Derikx
- (Netherlands) Robert Reckers
- (Netherlands) Sander van der Weide
- (New Zealand) Gareth Brooks
- (New Zealand) Bevan Hari
- (New Zealand) David Kosoof
- (New Zealand) Wayne McIndoe
- (Pakistan) Ghazanfar Ali
- (Pakistan) Tariq Aziz
- (South Africa) Steven Evans
- (South Africa) Ian Symons
- (South Korea) Seo Jong-Ho
- (South Korea) Ji Seong-Hwan
- (South Korea) Kang Seong-Jung

Source: FIH
