= Egypt men's national water polo team =

Men's national water polo team representing Egypt

Egypt
- FINA code: EGY
- Confederation: CANA (Africa)

Olympic Games (team statistics)
- Appearances: 6 (first in 1948)
- Best result: 7th place (1948)

World Championship
- Appearances: 2 (first in 1982)
- Best result: 15th place (1982, 1991)

World League
- Appearances: 1 (first in 2008)
- Best result: 10th place (2008)

Mediterranean Games
- Appearances: 4 (first in 1951)
- Best result: (silver) (1951)
Medal record
Mediterranean Games
Silver medal – second place	1951 Alexandria	Team
Bronze medal – third place	1959 Beirut	Team

The Egypt men's national water polo team is the representative for Egypt in international men's water polo.

== Results ==
=== Olympic Games ===
- 1948 — 7th place
- 1952 — 10th place
- 1960 — 13th place
- 1964 — 12th place
- 1968 — 15th place
- 2004 — 12th place

=== World Championship ===
- 1982 — 15th place
- 1991 — 15th place

=== FINA World League ===
- 2008 — 10th place

== See also ==
- Egypt men's Olympic water polo team records and statistics
