= Water polo at the 1998 World Aquatics Championships =

The water polo events at the 1998 World Aquatics Championships were held from 7 to 18 January 1998, in Perth, Western Australia.

== Medal summary ==
=== Medal table ===
Rank	Nation	Gold	Silver	Bronze	Total
1	Italy (ITA)	1	0	0	1
1	Spain (ESP)	1	0	0	1
3	Hungary (HUN)	0	1	0	1
3	Netherlands (NED)	0	1	0	1
5	Australia (AUS)	0	0	1	1
5	Yugoslavia (FRY)	0	0	1	1
Totals (6 entries)		2	2	2	6

=== Medalists ===
Event	Gold	Silver	Bronze
Men	Spain Daniel Ballart; Manuel Estiarte; Pedro Garcia; Salvador Gomez; Miguel Gonzales; Gustavo Marcos; Ruben Michavilla; Ivan Moro; Sergi Pedresol; Ivan Perez; Jesus Rollan; Jordi Sans; Carlos Sanz Head coach: Juan Jané	Hungary Zoltán Kovacs; Zoltán Kósz; Tibor Benedek; Gergely Kiss; Frank Toth; Rajmund Fodor; Zsolt Varga; Barnabás Steinmetz; Balázs Vincze; Tamás Molnár; Tamás Kásás; Attila Vári; Tamás Marcz Head coach: Dénes Kemény	Yugoslavia Aleksandar Ćirić; Danilo Ikodinović; Dragan Jovanović; Nikola Kuljača; Aleksandar Nikolić; Dušan Popović; Dejan Savić; Aleksandar Šapić; Petar Trbojević; Veljko Uskoković; Željko Vičević; Vladimir Vujasinović; Nenad Vukanić Head coach: Nikola Stamenić
Women	Italy Carmela Alluci; Alexandra Araujo; Cristina Consoli; Francesca Conti; Antonella Di Giacinto; Eleonora Gay; Melania Grego; Stefania Larucci; Giusi Malato; Martina Micelli; Maddalena Musumeci; Monica Vaillant; Milena Virzi	Netherlands Karla van der Boon; Carla van Usen; Ellen Bast; Gillian van den Berg; Daniëlle de Bruijn; Edmée Hiemstra; Karin Kuipers; Ingrid Leijendekker; Petra Meerdink; Carla Quint; Sandra Scherrenburg; Mariëlle Schothans; Marjan op den Velde	Australia Naomi Castle, Simone Dixon, Kylie English, Bridgette Gusterson, Yvette Higgins, Bronwyn Mayer, Melissa Mills, Stephanie Neesham, Marian Taylor, Liz Weekes, Sharan Wheelock, Danielle Woodhouse, Taryn Woods.
