= Water polo at the 2001 World Aquatics Championships =

The water polo events at the 2001 World Aquatics Championships were held from 18 to 29 July 2001, in Fukuoka, Japan.

== Medal summary ==
=== Medal table ===
Rank	Nation	Gold	Silver	Bronze	Total
1	Italy (ITA)	1	0	0	1
1	Spain (ESP)	1	0	0	1
3	Hungary (HUN)	0	1	0	1
4	Canada (CAN)	0	0	1	1
4	Russia (RUS)	0	0	1	1
Totals (5 entries)		2	1	2	5

=== Medalists ===
Event	Gold	Silver	Bronze
Men	Spain Angel Andreo; Daniel Ballart; Salvador Gomez; Gabriel Hernandez; Gustavo Marcos; Guillermo Molina; Daniel Moro; Ivan Moro; Sergi Pedrerol; Ivan Perez; Jesus Rollan; Javier Sánchez; Carlos Sanz Head coach: Juan Jané	Yugoslavia Aleksandar Ćirić; Danilo Ikodinović; Viktor Jelenić; Branko Peković; Dejan Savić; Aleksandar Šapić; Denis Šefik; Aleksandar Šoštar; Petar Trbojević; Veljko Uskoković; Vladimir Vujasinović; Nenad Vukanić; Predrag Zimonjić Head coach: Nenad Manojlović	Russia Ilya Smirnov; Yuri Yatsev; Aleksandr Fyodorov; Nikolay Kozlov; Roman Balashov; Aleksandr Yeryshov; Revaz Chomakhidze; Alexey Panfili; Dmitry Gorshkov (c); Marat Zakirov; Sergey Garbuzov; Irek Zinnurov; Andrei Rekechinski Head coach: Aleksandr Kabanov
Women	Italy Carmella Alluci; Alexandra Araujo; Silvia Bosurgi; Cristina Consoli; Francesca Conti; Tania Di Mario; Melania Grego; Giusi Malato; Martina Miceli; Maddalena Musumeci; Paola Sabbatini; Gabriella Sciolti; Monica Vaillant	Hungary Katalin Dancsa, Rita Drávucz, Anikó Pelle, Ágnes Primász, Katalin Rédei, Edit Sipos, Ildikó Sós, Mercédesz Stieber, Brigitta Szép, Krisztina Szremkó, Zsuzsanna Tiba, Ágnes Valkai, Erzsébet Valkai Head coach: Tamás Faragó.	Canada
