= 1999 FINA Men's Water Polo World Cup =

- League: FINA Water Polo World Cup
- Sport: Water polo
- Duration: 28 September - 03 October

Super Final
- Finals champions: Hungary
- Runners-up: Italy

FINA Water Polo World Cup seasons
- ← 1997 2002 →

The 1999 FINA Men's Water Polo World Cup was the eleventh World Cup.

The 11th edition of the Men's FINA Water Polo World Cup were held in Sydney, Australia from September 28 to October 3, 1999.

== Teams ==
The top eight teams from the previous World Aquatic Championship have qualified.

Teams	Qualified as
Australia; Spain; Hungary; Yugoslavia; Italy; Russia; United States; Greece	Host (4th 1998 World Championship); 1st 1998 World Championship; 2nd 1998 World Championship; 3rd 1998 World Championship; 5th 1998 World Championship; 6th 1998 World Championship; 7th 1998 World Championship; 8th 1998 World Championship

== Seeding ==
Following ranking of the 1998 World Championship

Pot 1	Pot 2	Pot 3	Pot 4
Spain (1); Hungary (2)	FR Yugoslavia (3); Australia (4) (H)	Italy (5); Russia (6)	United States (7); Greece (8)

== Groups ==
Group A	Group B
Hungary; Yugoslavia; Italy; Greece	Spain; Australia (H); United States; Russia

== Preliminary round ==
=== GROUP A ===
	Team	Points	G	W	D	L	GF	GA	Diff	Qualification
1.	Hungary	4	3	2	0	1	31	17	+14	Semi-finals
2.	Italy	4	3	2	0	1	21	21	0	Semi-finals
3.	Yugoslavia	4	3	2	0	1	19	20	–1	5th–8th place
4.	Greece	0	3	0	0	3	13	26	–13	5th–8th place

- Tuesday 28 September 1999

Italy	10 – 8	Hungary
Yugoslavia	8 – 4	Greece

- Wednesday 29 September 1999

Hungary	11 – 3	Yugoslavia
Italy	6 – 5	Greece

- Thursday 30 September 1999

Yugoslavia	8 – 5	Italy
Hungary	12 – 4	Greece

=== GROUP B ===
	Team	Points	G	W	D	L	GF	GA	Diff	Qualification
1.	Russia	4	3	2	0	1	26	25	+1	Semi-finals
2.	Spain	4	3	2	0	1	23	22	+1	Semi-finals
3.	United States	4	3	2	0	1	22	20	+2	5th–8th place
4.	Australia (H)	0	3	0	0	3	18	22	–4	5th–8th place

- Tuesday 28 September 1999

Spain	9 – 6	United States
Russia	10 – 9	Australia

- Wednesday 29 September 1999

Russia	9 – 8	Spain
United States	6 – 4	Australia

- Thursday 30 September 1999

United States	8 – 7	Russia
Spain	6 – 5	Australia

== 5th–8th place semifinals ==
- Saturday 2 October 1999

Yugoslavia	7 – 5	Australia
United States	10 – 4	Greece

== Semi-finals ==
- Saturday 2 October 1999

Hungary	8 – 4	Spain
Italy	7 – 5	Russia

== Seventh place ==
- Sunday 3 october 1999

Greece	10 – 9	Australia

== Fifth place ==
- Sunday 3 october 1999

Yugoslavia	8 – 4	United States

== Third place ==
- Sunday 3 october 1999

Spain	9 – 8	Russia

== Final ==
- Sunday 3 october 1999

Hungary	5 – 3	Italy

== Final ranking ==
RANK	TEAM
	Hungary
	Italy
	Spain
4.	Russia
5.	Yugoslavia
6.	United States
7.	Greece
8.	Australia

1999 Men's FINA World Cup winners

Hungary
Third title

*Hungary, Italy and Spain qualified for the 2000 Summer Olympics in Sydney, Australia. Croatia also qualified, although the team was not even at the World Cup, having finished ninth at last year's World Swimming Championships in Perth, Australia, missing the eight-team cut-off for the World Cup. But by finishing second at the recent European Championship and the fact that Hungary downed Olympic and World Champion Spain 8-4 in the medal semi-final, Croatia claimed the European continental berth.

== Individual awards ==
- Most Valuable Player
  - ???
- Best Goalkeeper
  - ???
- Topscorer
  - Manuel Estiarte (ESP) – 11 goals

== Squads ==
=== Hungary ===
- Péter Biros
- Rajmund Fodor
- Tamás Kásás
- Gergely Kiss
- Zoltán Kósz
- Tamás Marcz
- Tamás Molnár
- Barnabás Steinmetz
- Zoltán Szécsi
- Frank Tóth
- Zsolt Varga
- Attila Vári
- Balázs Vincze

Head coach:

- Dénes Kemény

=== Italy ===
- Alberto Angelini
- Alessandro Calcaterra
- Roberto Calcaterra
- Leonardo Binchi
- Marco Gerini
- Alberto Ghibellini
- Enrico Mammarella
- Andrea Mangiante
- Francesco Postiglione
- Stefano Tempesti
- Carlo Silipo
- Leonardo Sottani
- Antonio Vittorioso

Head coach:

- Ratko Rudić

=== Spain ===
- Daniel Ballart
- Manuel Estiarte
- Carlos García
- Pedro Francisco García
- Salvador Gómez
- Miguel Ángel González
- Gabriel Hernández Paz
- Gustavo Marcos
- Iván Moro
- Sergi Pedrerol
- Iván Pérez
- Jesús Rollán
- Jordi Sans

Head coach:

- Juan Jané
