= Water polo at the 2001 World Aquatics Championships – Men's tournament =

Tournament details
- Venue(s): Japan (in Fukuoka host cities)
- Dates: 19 – 29 July
- Teams: 16 (from 4 confederations)

Final positions
- Champions: Spain (2nd title)
- Runner-up: Yugoslavia
- Third place: Russia
- Fourth place: Italy

Tournament statistics
- Matches played: 60
- Goals scored: 822 (13.7 per match)
- Top scorer(s): (Serbia and Montenegro) Aleksandar Šapić (18 goals)

The 2001 Men's World Water Polo Championship was the ninth edition of the men's water polo tournament at the World Aquatics Championships, organised by the world governing body in aquatics, the FINA. The tournament was held from 19 to 29 July 2001, and was incorporated into the 2001 World Aquatics Championships in Fukuoka, Japan.

== Participating teams ==
Americas	Asia	Europe	Oceania
Brazil; Canada; United States	Kazakhstan; Japan	Croatia; Germany; Greece; Hungary; Italy; Netherlands; Russia; Slovakia; Spain; Yugoslavia	Australia

=== Groups formed ===
Group A

- Brazil
- Italy
- Slovakia
- Yugoslavia

Group B

- Germany
- Greece
- Hungary
- Kazakhstan

Group C

- Canada
- Netherlands
- Russia
- United States

Group D

- Australia
- Croatia
- Japan
- Spain

== Preliminary round ==
Qualified for the Second round
Will play for places 13–16 in a round robin group. (Group G)

=== Group A ===
Pos	Team	Pts	Pld	W	D	L	GF	GA	GD
1	Italy	5	3	2	1	0	20	9	+11
2	Yugoslavia	5	3	2	1	0	23	14	+9
3	Slovakia	2	3	1	0	2	19	23	−4
4	Brazil	0	3	0	0	3	11	27	−16

- July 19, 2001

Slovakia	6 – 7	Yugoslavia
Italy	6 – 1	Brazil

- July 21, 2001

Yugoslavia	3 – 3	Italy
Slovakia	8 – 5	Brazil

- July 22, 2001

Yugoslavia	13 – 5	Brazil
Slovakia	5 – 11	Italy

=== Group B ===
Pos	Team	Pts	Pld	W	D	L	GF	GA	GD
1	Hungary	6	3	3	0	0	32	20	+12
2	Greece	2	3	1	0	2	23	24	−1
3	Kazakhstan	2	3	1	0	2	13	16	−3
4	Germany	2	3	1	0	2	20	28	−8

- July 19, 2001

Germany	9 – 8	Greece
Hungary	7 – 3	Kazakhstan

- July 21, 2001

Greece	10 – 11	Hungary
Germany	4 – 6	Kazakhstan

- July 22, 2001

Greece	5 – 4	Kazakhstan
Germany	7 – 14	Hungary

=== Group C ===
Pos	Team	Pts	Pld	W	D	L	GF	GA	GD
1	Russia	6	3	3	0	0	33	22	+11
2	Netherlands	4	3	2	0	1	23	18	+5
3	United States	2	3	1	0	2	20	19	+1
4	Canada	0	3	0	0	3	13	30	−17

- July 19, 2001

United States	9 – 10	Russia
Netherlands	10 – 4	Canada

- July 21, 2001

United States	6 – 3	Canada
Russia	9 – 7	Netherlands

- July 22, 2001

Russia	14 – 6	Canada
United States	5 – 6	Netherlands

=== Group D ===
Pos	Team	Pts	Pld	W	D	L	GF	GA	GD
1	Spain	6	3	3	0	0	26	6	+20
2	Croatia	4	3	2	0	1	20	14	+6
3	Australia	2	3	1	0	2	13	21	−8
4	Japan	0	3	0	0	3	8	26	−18

- July 19, 2001

Croatia	8 – 2	Japan
Spain	8 – 1	Australia

- July 21, 2001

Croatia	8 – 6	Australia
Japan	1 – 12	Spain

- July 22, 2001

Japan	5 – 6	Australia
Croatia	4 – 6	Spain

== Second round ==
Qualified for the Semi finals
Will play for places 5–8 in a Knockout system
Will play for places 9–12 in a Knockout system

=== Group E ===
Pos	Team	Pts	Pld	W	D	L	GF	GA	GD
1	Yugoslavia	9	5	4	1	0	38	25	+13
2	Italy	7	5	3	1	1	37	21	+16
3	Hungary	6	5	3	0	2	36	32	+4
4	Greece	6	5	3	0	2	30	28	+2
5	Kazakhstan	2	5	1	0	4	26	48	−22
6	Slovakia	0	5	0	0	5	28	41	−13

Preliminary round results apply.

- July 24, 2001

Italy	13 – 3	Kazakhstan
Slovakia	8 – 9	Hungary
Yugoslavia	4 – 3	Greece

- July 25, 2001

Yugoslavia	8 – 7	Hungary
Slovakia	7 – 10	Kazakhstan
Italy	7 – 8	Greece

- July 26, 2001

Slovakia	2 – 4	Greece
Yugoslavia	16 – 6	Kazakhstan
Italy	3 – 2	Hungary

=== Group F ===
Pos	Team	Pts	Pld	W	D	L	GF	GA	GD
1	Spain	10	5	5	0	0	43	22	+21
2	Russia	8	5	4	0	1	43	35	+8
3	Croatia	6	5	3	0	2	42	28	+14
4	United States	2	5	1	0	4	29	42	−13
5	Australia	2	5	1	0	4	21	35	−14
6	Netherlands	2	5	1	0	4	26	42	−16

Preliminary round results apply.

- July 24, 2001

Russia	8 – 3	Australia
United States	4 – 10	Spain
Netherlands	3 – 12	Croatia

- July 25, 2001

Netherlands	5 – 10	Spain
United States	6 – 5	Australia
Russia	8 – 7	Croatia

- July 26, 2001

United States	5 – 11	Croatia
Netherlands	5 – 6	Australia
Russia	8 – 9	Spain

=== Group G ===
Pos	Team	Pts	Pld	W	D	L	GF	GA	GD
13	Brazil	5	3	2	1	0	28	14	+14
14	Germany	4	3	1	2	0	21	17	+4
15	Canada	3	3	1	1	1	21	25	−4
16	Japan	0	3	0	0	3	21	35	−14

- July 24, 2001

Germany	6 – 6	Canada
Brazil	13 – 6	Japan

- July 25, 2001

Brazil	5 – 5	Germany
Canada	12 – 9	Japan

- July 26, 2001

Germany	10 – 6	Japan
Brazil	10 – 3	Canada

== Final round ==
=== 9th-12th place ===
9th - 12th place
2001-07-28 – Fukuoka
Slovakia	6
Australia	7
2001-07-28 – Fukuoka
Kazakhstan	5
Netherlands	9

9th place
2001-07-29 – Fukuoka
Australia	3
Netherlands	8
11th place
2001-07-29 – Fukuoka
Slovakia	12
Kazakhstan	6

- July 28, 2001

Slovakia	6 – 7	Australia
Kazakhstan	5 – 9	Netherlands

- July 29, 2001 — 9th place

Australia	3 – 8	Netherlands

- July 29, 2001 — 11th place

Slovakia	12 – 6	Kazakhstan

=== 5th-8th place ===
5th - 8th place
2001-07-28 – Fukuoka
Greece	12
Croatia	11
2001-07-28 – Fukuoka
Hungary	9
United States	7

5th place
2001-07-29 – Fukuoka
Greece	5
Hungary	8
7th place
2001-07-29 – Fukuoka
Croatia	9
United States	10

- July 28, 2001

Greece	12 – 11	Croatia
Hungary	9 – 7	United States

- July 29, 2001 — 5th place

Greece	5 – 8	Hungary

- July 29, 2001 — 7th place

Croatia	9 – 10	United States

=== 1st-4th place ===
Semi-finals
July 28, 2001 – Fukuoka
Spain	4
Italy	2
July 28, 2001 – Fukuoka
Yugoslavia	9
Russia	8

Final
July 29, 2001 – Fukuoka
Spain	4
Yugoslavia	2
Third place
July 29, 2001 – Fukuoka
Russia	7
Italy	6

=== Semi finals ===
- July 28, 2001

Spain	4 – 2	Italy
Yugoslavia	9 – 8	Russia

=== Finals ===
- July 29, 2001 — Bronze Medal Match

Russia	7 – 6	Italy

- July 29, 2001 — Gold Medal Match

Spain	4 – 2	Yugoslavia

== Final ranking ==
RANK	TEAM
	Spain
	Yugoslavia
	Russia
4.	Italy
5.	Hungary
6.	Greece
7.	United States
8.	Croatia
9.	Netherlands
10.	Australia
11.	Slovakia
12.	Kazakhstan
13.	Brazil
14.	Germany
15.	Canada
16.	Japan

2001 FINA Men's World champions

Spain
Second title

Team roster

Angel Andreo, Daniel Ballart, Salvador Gomez, Gabriel Hernandez, Gustavo Marcos, Guillermo Molina, Daniel Moro, Ivan Moro, Sergi Pedrerol, Ivan Perez, Jesus Rollan, Javier Sánchez, Carlos Sanz
Head coach: Juan Jané

== Medalists ==
Gold	Silver	Bronze
Spain Angel Andreo; Daniel Ballart; Salvador Gomez; Gabriel Hernandez; Gustavo Marcos; Guillermo Molina; Daniel Moro; Ivan Moro; Sergi Pedrerol; Ivan Perez; Jesus Rollan; Javier Sánchez; Carlos Sanz Head coach: Juan Jané	Yugoslavia Aleksandar Ćirić; Danilo Ikodinović; Viktor Jelenić; Branko Peković; Dejan Savić; Aleksandar Šapić; Denis Šefik; Aleksandar Šoštar; Petar Trbojević; Veljko Uskoković; Vladimir Vujasinović (c); Nenad Vukanić; Predrag Zimonjić Head coach: Nenad Manojlović	Russia Ilya Smirnov; Yuri Yatsev; Aleksandr Fyodorov; Nikolay Kozlov; Roman Balashov; Aleksandr Yeryshov; Revaz Chomakhidze; Alexey Panfili; Dmitry Gorshkov (c); Marat Zakirov; Sergey Garbuzov; Irek Zinnurov; Andrei Rekechinski Head coach: Aleksandr Kabanov

== Individual awards ==
- Best Goalkeeper

- Jesús Rollán (ESP)

- Topscorer

- Aleksandar Šapić (SCG) — 18 goals
