= The Final Game (2022 film) =

- Theatrical release poster
- Spanish: 42 segundos
- Directed by: Àlex Murrull; Dani de la Orden
- Screenplay by: Carlos Franco
- Produced by: Alberto Aranda; Toni Carrizosa
- Starring: Álvaro Cervantes; Jaime Lorente
- Cinematography: Pau Castejón
- Edited by: Alberto Gutiérrez
- Music by: Óscar Araujo
- Production companies: Playtime Movies; Sábado Películas; Imminent Produccions
- Distributed by: Universal Pictures International Spain
- Release date: 2 September 2022
- Countries: Spain; Andorra
- Languages: Spanish; Catalan

The Final Game or Olympics (Spanish: 42 segundos; transl. '42 Seconds') is a 2022 Spanish-Andorran sports drama film directed by Àlex Murrull and Dani de la Orden from a screenplay by Carlos Franco which stars Álvaro Cervantes and Jaime Lorente as Manel Estiarte and Pedro García Aguado. It is a dramatization of the Spain men's national water polo team's run at the 1992 Summer Olympics in Barcelona.

== Plot ==
The plot is a dramatization of the Spain men's national water polo team's run at the 1992 Summer Olympics in Barcelona, delving into the personal stories of Pedro García Aguado (and his substance addiction) and Manel Estiarte (coping with the tragedy of his sister's suicide). Despite opposing personalities, they end up reaching an understanding built upon the shared suffering under coach Matutinović, characterised by inhuman training methods that earned the latter the team's animosity.

== Cast ==
- Álvaro Cervantes as Manel Estiarte
- Jaime Lorente as Pedro García Aguado
- Pep Ambròs
- Àlex Maruny
- Roger Casamajor
- Joan Sentís
- Christian Valencia as Jesús Rollán
- Tarik Filipović as Dragan Matutinović

== Production ==
The screenplay was penned by Carlos Franco. A Spanish-Andorran co-production, the film was produced by Playtime Movies and Sábado Películas alongside Imminent Produccions, with the participation of RTVE and collaboration from ICEC and Govern d'Andorra. Filming had already wrapped in November 2021. Shooting locations included Barcelona and Andorra.

== Release ==
Distributed by Universal Pictures International Spain, the film was theatrically released in Spain on 2 September 2022.

== Reception ==
David Pardillos of Cinemanía rated the film 3½ out 5 stars, considering that the helmers "manage to maintain the tension until the last second and demonstrate that sometimes great stories also emerge from defeats".

Fausto Fernández of Fotogramas rated the film 3 out of 5 stars, welcoming the delivery of a Spanish-cinema equivalent to Hoosiers whilst citing "certain digital tweaks" as a negative point.

Ekaitz Ortega of HobbyConsolas rated the film 63 out of 100 points ("acceptable"), considering that even if Olympics suffers from a certain standardization in the way the story is told, it is a sincere film that entertains throughout, highlighting the work by Lorente and Cervantes and the adaptation of the historical context.

Manuel J. Lombardo of Diario de Sevilla rated the film 2 out of 5 stars, deeming it to be "a film of basic values and soaked testosterone that is only missing a touch of locker-room homoeroticism to be a true product of its time".

== See also ==
- List of Spanish films of 2022
