= Water polo at the 1996 Summer Olympics =

Water polo at the Games of the XXVI Olympiad
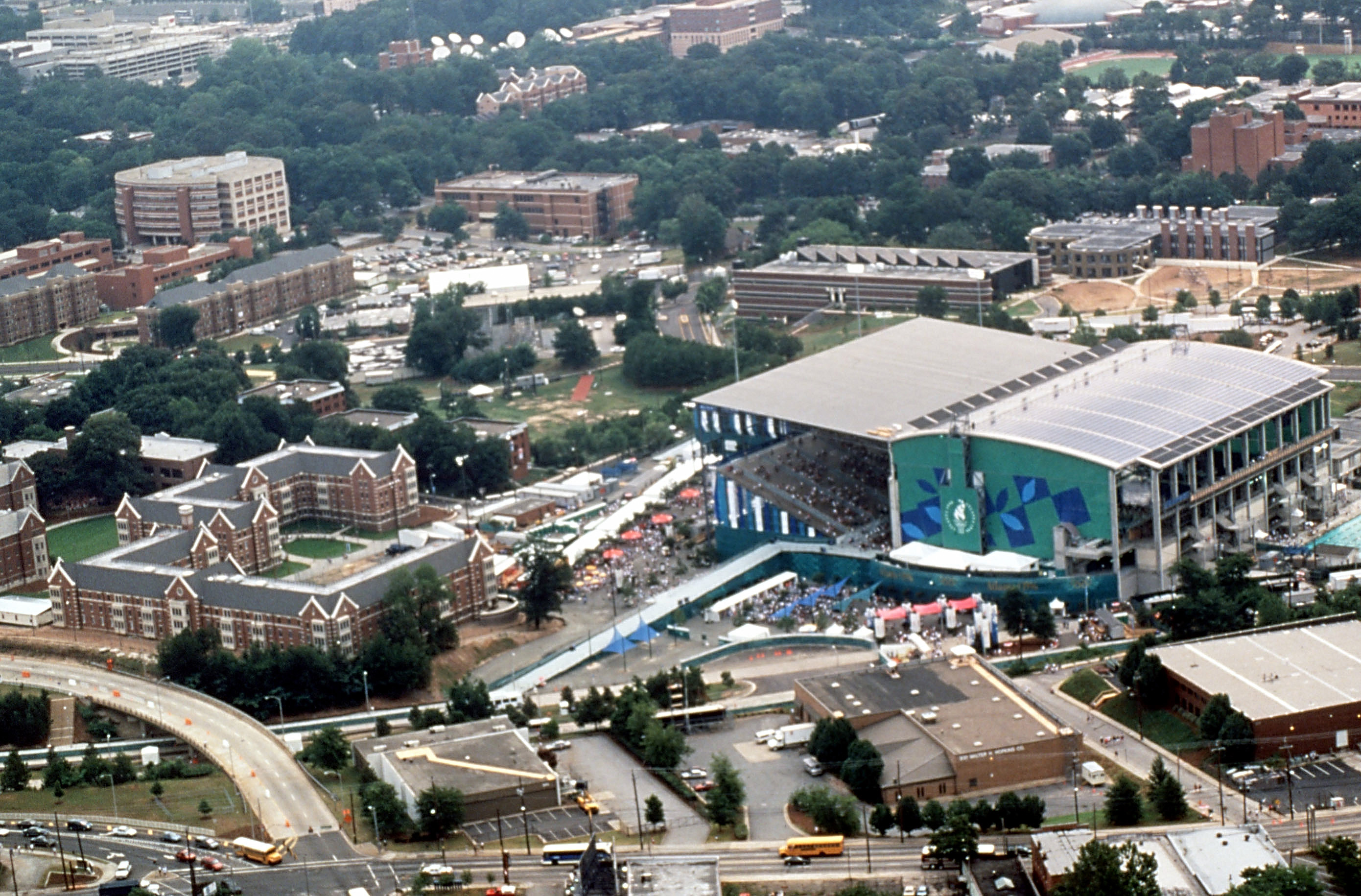

Tournament details
- Host country: United States
- City: Atlanta
- Venue(s): Georgia Tech Aquatic Center
- Dates: 20 July 1996 – 28 July 1996
- Event: 1 (men's)
- Teams: 12 (from 2 confederations)
- Competitors: 153

Final positions
- Champions: Spain (1st title)
- Runners-up: Croatia
- Third place: Italy
- Fourth place: Hungary

Tournament statistics
- Matches: 48
- Multiple appearances: 5-time Olympian(s): 1; 4-time Olympian(s): 3
- Top scorer(s): (Hungary) Tibor Benedek (19 goals)
- Most saves: (Netherlands) Arie van de Bunt (81 saves)

The water polo tournament at the 1996 Summer Olympics was held from 20 to 28 July 1996, in Atlanta, United States.

== Qualification ==
Qualification	Date	Host	Berths	Qualified
Host nation	18 September 1990	(Japan) Tokyo	1	United States
1995 World Cup	12-17 September 1995	(United States) Atlanta	3	Hungary
1995 World Cup	12-17 September 1995	(United States) Atlanta	3	Italy
1995 World Cup	12-17 September 1995	(United States) Atlanta	3	Russia
1994 World Championships	2-10 September 1994	(Italy) Rome	2	Spain
1994 World Championships	2-10 September 1994	(Italy) Rome	2	Croatia
Intercontinental qualification	10-18 February 1996	(Germany) Berlin	6	Yugoslavia Greece Netherlands Ukraine Germany Romania
Total			12	

== Teams ==
GROUP A

- Germany
- Hungary
- Netherlands
- Russia
- Spain
- Yugoslavia

GROUP B

- Croatia
- Greece
- Italy
- Romania
- Ukraine
- United States

== Preliminary round ==
=== Group A ===
Pos	Team	Pld	W	D	L	GF	GA	GD	Pts
1	Hungary	5	5	0	0	47	38	+9	10
2	FR Yugoslavia	5	3	1	1	46	44	+2	7
3	Spain	5	3	0	2	39	33	+6	6
4	Russia	5	2	1	2	42	38	+4	5
5	Germany	5	1	0	4	36	45	−9	2
6	Netherlands	5	0	0	5	36	48	−12	0

20 July 1996	Hungary	8–7	Russia	Georgia Tech Aquatic Center

20 July 1996	Spain	9–3	Germany	Georgia Tech Aquatic Center

20 July 1996	FR Yugoslavia	11–8	Netherlands	Georgia Tech Aquatic Center

21 July 1996	Hungary	9–8	Germany	Georgia Tech Aquatic Center

21 July 1996	Russia	9–9	FR Yugoslavia	Georgia Tech Aquatic Center

21 July 1996	Spain	8–7	Netherlands	Georgia Tech Aquatic Center

22 July 1996	Hungary	10–8	Netherlands	Georgia Tech Aquatic Center

22 July 1996	Russia	10–8	Germany	Georgia Tech Aquatic Center

22 July 1996	FR Yugoslavia	9–7	Spain	Georgia Tech Aquatic Center

23 July 1996	Hungary	8–7	Spain	Georgia Tech Aquatic Center

23 July 1996	Russia	10–5	Netherlands	Georgia Tech Aquatic Center

23 July 1996	FR Yugoslavia	9–8	Germany	Georgia Tech Aquatic Center

24 July 1996	Germany	9–8	Netherlands	Georgia Tech Aquatic Center

24 July 1996	Hungary	12–8	FR Yugoslavia	Georgia Tech Aquatic Center

24 July 1996	Spain	8–6	Russia	Georgia Tech Aquatic Center

=== Group B ===
Pos	Team	Pld	W	D	L	GF	GA	GD	Pts
1	Italy	5	5	0	0	48	38	+10	10
2	United States	5	4	0	1	45	37	+8	8
3	Croatia	5	3	0	2	51	39	+12	6
4	Greece	5	2	0	3	37	38	−1	4
5	Romania	5	0	1	4	31	45	−14	1
6	Ukraine	5	0	1	4	33	48	−15	1

20 July 1996	Croatia	8–5	Greece	Georgia Tech Aquatic Center

20 July 1996	Italy	10–7	United States	Georgia Tech Aquatic Center

20 July 1996	Romania	6–6	Ukraine	Georgia Tech Aquatic Center

21 July 1996	Croatia	11–6	Romania	Georgia Tech Aquatic Center

21 July 1996	Italy	8–6	Ukraine	Georgia Tech Aquatic Center

21 July 1996	United States	9–7	Greece	Georgia Tech Aquatic Center

22 July 1996	Greece	8–5	Romania	Georgia Tech Aquatic Center

22 July 1996	Italy	10–8	Croatia	Georgia Tech Aquatic Center

22 July 1996	United States	9–7	Ukraine	Georgia Tech Aquatic Center

23 July 1996	Croatia	16–8	Ukraine	Georgia Tech Aquatic Center

23 July 1996	Italy	10–8	Greece	Georgia Tech Aquatic Center

23 July 1996	United States	10–5	Romania	Georgia Tech Aquatic Center

24 July 1996	Greece	9–6	Ukraine	Georgia Tech Aquatic Center

24 July 1996	Italy	10–9	Romania	Georgia Tech Aquatic Center

24 July 1996	United States	10–8	Croatia	Georgia Tech Aquatic Center

== Classification round ==
	Team	Points	G	W	D	L	GF	GA	Diff
9.	Germany	6	3	3	0	0	29	16	+13
10.	Netherlands	3	3	1	1	1	25	26	–1
11.	Romania	2	3	1	0	2	25	28	–3
12.	Ukraine	1	3	0	1	2	21	30	–9

26 July 1996	Germany	10–4	Ukraine	Georgia Tech Aquatic Center

26 July 1996	Netherlands	10–8	Romania	Georgia Tech Aquatic Center

27 July 1996	Germany	9–6	Netherlands	Georgia Tech Aquatic Center

27 July 1996	Romania	11–8	Ukraine	Georgia Tech Aquatic Center

28 July 1996	Netherlands	9–9	Ukraine	Georgia Tech Aquatic Center

28 July 1996	Germany	10–6	Romania	Georgia Tech Aquatic Center

== Final round ==
Quarter-finals
Hungary	12
Greece	8
Spain	5
United States	4
FR Yugoslavia	6
Croatia	8
Russia	9
Italy	11

Semi-finals
Hungary	6
Spain	7
Croatia	7
Italy	6

Final
Spain	7
Croatia	5
Third place
Hungary	18
Italy	20

=== Quarterfinals ===
26 July 1996	Hungary	12–8	Greece	Georgia Tech Aquatic Center

26 July 1996	FR Yugoslavia	6–8	Croatia	Georgia Tech Aquatic Center

26 July 1996	Spain	5–4	United States	Georgia Tech Aquatic Center

26 July 1996	Russia	9–11	Italy	Georgia Tech Aquatic Center

=== Semifinals ===
5th/8th place

27 July 1996	Greece	7–6	United States	Georgia Tech Aquatic Center

27 July 1996	FR Yugoslavia	15–16	Russia	Georgia Tech Aquatic Center

1st/4th place

27 July 1996	Croatia	7–6	Italy	Georgia Tech Aquatic Center

27 July 1996	Hungary	6–7	Spain	Georgia Tech Aquatic Center

=== Finals ===
==== 7th place match ====
28 July 1996	United States	12–8	FR Yugoslavia	Georgia Tech Aquatic Center

==== 5th place match ====
28 July 1996	Greece	8–10	Russia	Georgia Tech Aquatic Center

==== Bronze medal match ====
28 July 1996	Hungary	18–20	Italy	Georgia Tech Aquatic Center

==== Gold medal match ====
28 July 1996	Spain	7–5	Croatia	Georgia Tech Aquatic Center

== Ranking and statistics ==
=== Final ranking ===
RANK	TEAM
	Spain
	Croatia
	Italy
4.	Hungary
5.	Russia
6.	Greece
7.	United States
8.	FR Yugoslavia
9.	Germany
10.	Netherlands
11.	Romania
12.	Ukraine

1996 Men's Olympic champions

Spain
First title

=== Multi-time Olympians ===
Five-time Olympian(s): 1 player

- Spain: Manuel Estiarte

Four-time Olympian(s): 3 players

- Greece: George Mavrotas, Anastasios Papanastasiou
- Spain: Jordi Sans

== Medallists ==
Event	Gold	Silver	Bronze
Men's tournament	Spain Josep María Abarca; Ángel Andreo; Daniel Ballart; Pedro Francisco García; Salvador Gómez; Manuel Estiarte; Iván Moro; Miguel Ángel Oca; Jorge Payá; Sergi Pedrerol; Jesús Rollán; Jordi Sans; Carles Sans Head Coach: Joan Jané	Croatia Maro Balić; Perica Bukić; Damir Glavan; Igor Hinić; Vjekoslav Kobešćak; Joško Kreković; Ognjen Kržić; Dubravko Šimenc; Siniša Školneković; Ratko Štritof; Renato Vrbičić; Tino Vegar; Zdeslav Vrdoljak Head Coach: Bruno Silić	Italy Alberto Angelini; Francesco Attolico; Fabio Bencivenga; Alessandro Bovo; Alessandro Calcaterra; Roberto Calcaterra; Marco Gerini; Alberto Ghibellini; Luca Giustolisi; Amedeo Pomilio; Francesco Postiglione; Carlo Silipo; Leonardo Sottani Head Coach: Ratko Rudić

== See also ==
- 1994 FINA Men's World Water Polo Championship
- 1998 FINA Men's World Water Polo Championship

== Sources ==
- PDF documents in the LA84 Foundation Digital Library:
  - Official Report of the 1996 Olympic Games, v.3 (download, archive) (pp. 56–73)
- Water polo on the Olympedia website
  - Water polo at the 1996 Summer Olympics (men's tournament)
- Water polo on the Sports Reference website
  - Water polo at the 1996 Summer Games (men's tournament) (archived)
