= Water polo at the 1998 World Aquatics Championships – Men's tournament =

Tournament details
- Venue(s): Australia (in Perth host cities)
- Dates: 7 – 18 January
- Teams: 16 (from 5 confederations)

Final positions
- Champions: Spain (1st title)
- Runner-up: Hungary
- Third place: Yugoslavia
- Fourth place: Australia

Tournament statistics
- Matches played: 60
- Goals scored: 923 (15.38 per match)

The 1998 Men's World Water Polo Championship was the eighth edition of the men's water polo tournament at the World Aquatics Championships, organised by the world governing body in aquatics, the FINA. The tournament was held from 7 to 18 January 1998 in the Challenge Stadium, and was incorporated into the 1998 World Aquatics Championships in Perth, Western Australia.

== Participating teams ==
Africa	Americas	Asia	Europe	Oceania
South Africa	Brazil; Canada; United States	Kazakhstan; Iran	Croatia; Greece; Hungary; Italy; Russia; Slovakia; Spain; Yugoslavia	Australia; New Zealand

== Groups formed ==
Group A

- Croatia
- Kazakhstan
- New Zealand
- Russia

Group B

- Hungary
- Iran
- Italy
- Yugoslavia

Group C

- Brazil
- Greece
- South Africa
- Spain

Group D

- Australia
- Canada
- Slovakia
- United States

== Preliminary round ==
=== Group A ===
Pos	Team	Pts	Pld	W	D	L	GF	GA	GD
1	Russia	6	3	3	0	0	38	12	+26
2	Croatia	4	3	2	0	1	42	13	+29
3	Kazakhstan	2	3	1	0	2	27	38	−11
4	New Zealand	0	3	0	0	3	9	53	−44

- January 9, 1998

Kazakhstan	15 – 6	New Zealand
Russia	6 – 4	Croatia

- January 10, 1998

Russia	13 – 8	Kazakhstan
Croatia	19 – 3	New Zealand

- January 11, 1998

Russia	19 – 0	New Zealand
Croatia	19 – 4	Kazakhstan

=== Group B ===
Pos	Team	Pts	Pld	W	D	L	GF	GA	GD
1	Hungary	6	3	3	0	0	34	14	+20
2	Yugoslavia	4	3	2	0	1	34	21	+13
3	Italy	2	3	1	0	2	32	23	+9
4	Iran	0	3	0	0	3	7	49	−42

- January 9, 1998

Italy	15 – 1	Iran
Hungary	7 – 5	Yugoslavia

- January 10, 1998

Hungary	11 – 7	Italy
Yugoslavia	18 – 4	Iran

- January 11, 1998

Hungary	16 – 2	Iran
Yugoslavia	11 – 10	Italy

=== Group C ===
Pos	Team	Pts	Pld	W	D	L	GF	GA	GD
1	Spain	6	3	3	0	0	29	12	+17
2	Greece	4	3	2	0	1	26	18	+8
3	Brazil	2	3	1	0	2	16	22	−6
4	South Africa	0	3	0	0	3	13	32	−19

- January 9, 1998

Greece	9 – 5	Brazil
Spain	13 – 3	South Africa

- January 10, 1998

Spain	7 – 6	Greece
Brazil	8 – 4	South Africa

- January 11, 1998

Spain	9 – 3	Brazil
Greece	11 – 6	South Africa

=== Group D ===
Pos	Team	Pts	Pld	W	D	L	GF	GA	GD
1	Australia	6	3	3	0	0	26	19	+7
2	United States	4	3	2	0	1	24	13	+11
3	Slovakia	2	3	1	0	2	22	20	+2
4	Canada	0	3	0	0	3	9	29	−20

- January 9, 1998

Slovakia	9 – 3	Canada
Australia	7 – 6	United States

- January 10, 1998

United States	8 – 5	Slovakia
Australia	10 – 5	Canada

- January 11, 1998

United States	10 – 1	Canada
Australia	9 – 8	Slovakia

== Second round ==
=== Group E ===
Pos	Team	Pts	Pld	W	D	L	GF	GA	GD
1	Hungary	8	5	4	0	1	55	35	+20
2	Yugoslavia	7	5	3	1	1	47	35	+12
3	Russia	6	5	3	0	2	44	40	+4
4	Italy	5	5	2	1	2	47	40	+7
5	Croatia	4	5	1	2	2	46	34	+12
6	Kazakhstan	0	5	0	0	5	23	78	−55

Preliminary round results apply.

- January 13, 1998

Italy	8 – 6	Russia
Hungary	17 – 3	Kazakhstan
Croatia	6 – 6	Yugoslavia

- January 14, 1998

Hungary	9 – 8	Croatia
Italy	13 – 3	Kazakhstan
Yugoslavia	9 – 7	Russia

- January 15, 1998

Yugoslavia	16 – 5	Kazakhstan
Croatia	9 – 9	Italy
Russia	12 – 11	Hungary

=== Group F ===
Pos	Team	Pts	Pld	W	D	L	GF	GA	GD
1	Spain	10	5	5	0	0	41	25	+16
2	Australia	8	5	4	0	1	34	24	+10
3	United States	4	5	2	0	3	33	25	+8
4	Greece	4	5	2	0	3	30	30	0
5	Slovakia	4	5	2	0	3	41	49	−8
6	Brazil	0	5	0	0	5	23	49	−26

Preliminary round results apply.

- January 13, 1998

Spain	15 – 8	Slovakia
Greece	3 – 2	United States
Australia	9 – 2	Brazil

- January 14, 1998

Slovakia	9 – 8	Brazil
Spain	5 – 4	United States
Australia	5 – 3	Greece

- January 15, 1998

United States	15 – 5	Brazil
Slovakia	11 – 9	Greece

- January 16, 1998

Spain	5 – 4	Australia

=== Group G ===
Pos	Team	Pts	Pld	W	D	L	GF	GA	GD
1	Canada	6	3	3	0	0	29	18	+11
2	South Africa	4	3	2	0	1	20	17	+3
3	Iran	2	3	1	0	2	15	21	−6
4	New Zealand	0	3	0	0	3	12	20	−8

- January 13, 1998

South Africa	6 – 3	Iran
Canada	7 – 5	New Zealand

- January 14, 1998

Iran	6 – 5	New Zealand
Canada	12 – 7	South Africa

- January 15, 1998

Canada	10 – 6	Iran
South Africa	7 – 2	New Zealand

== Final round ==
=== 9th-12th place ===
9th - 12th place
1998-01-17 – Perth
Slovakia	8
Kazakhstan	7
1998-01-17 – Perth
Croatia	17
Brazil	6

9th place
1998-01-18 – Perth
Croatia	12
Slovakia	3
11th place
1998-01-18 – Perth
Kazakhstan	7
Brazil	6

- January 17, 1998

Slovakia	8 – 7	Kazakhstan
Croatia	17 – 6	Brazil

- January 18, 1998 — 9th place

Croatia	12 – 3	Slovakia

- January 18, 1998 — 11th place

Kazakhstan	7 – 6	Brazil

=== 5th-8th place ===
5th - 8th place
1998-01-17 – Perth
Italy	10
United States	8
1998-01-17 – Perth
Russia	12
Greece	8

5th place
1998-01-18 – Perth
Italy	14
Russia	3
7th place
1998-01-18 – Perth
United States	8
Greece	4

- January 17, 1998

Italy	10 – 8 (aet)	United States
Russia	12 – 8	Greece

- January 18, 1998 — 5th place

Italy	14 – 3	Russia

- January 18, 1998 — 7th place

United States	8 – 4	Greece

=== 1st-4th place ===
Semi-finals
January 18, 1998 – Perth
Spain	5
Yugoslavia	3
January 18, 1998 – Perth
Hungary	10
Australia	5

Final
January 19, 1998 – Perth
Spain	6
Hungary	4
Third place
January 19, 1998 – Perth
Yugoslavia	9
Australia	5

=== Semi finals ===
- 16 January 1998

Spain	5 – 3	Yugoslavia
Hungary	10 – 5	Australia

=== Finals ===
- 18 January 1998 – Bronze Medal Match

Yugoslavia	9 – 5	Australia

- 18 January 1998 – Gold Medal Match

Spain	6 – 4	Hungary

== Final ranking ==
RANK	TEAM
	Spain
	Hungary
	Yugoslavia
4.	Australia
5.	Italy
6.	Russia
7.	United States
8.	Greece
9.	Croatia
10.	Slovakia
11.	Kazakhstan
12.	Brazil
13.	Canada
14.	South Africa
15.	Iran
16.	New Zealand

1998 FINA Men's World champions

Spain
First title

Team roster

Daniel Ballart, Manuel Estiarte, Pedro García, Salvador Gómez, Miguel González, Gustavo Marcos, Rubén Michavila, Iván Moro, Sergi Pedrerol, Iván Pérez, Jesús Rollán, Jordi Sans, Carlos Sanz
Head coach: Juan Jané

== Medalists ==
Gold	Silver	Bronze
Spain Sergi Pedrerol; Pedro García; Carlos Sanz; Miguel González; Daniel Ballart; Salvador Gómez; Iván Moro; Manuel Estiarte (c); Gustavo Marcos; Iván Pérez; Jesús Rollán; Jordi Sans; Rubén Michavila Head coach: Juan Jané	Hungary Zoltán Kovacs; Zoltán Kósz; Tibor Benedek; Gergely Kiss; Frank Toth; Rajmund Fodor; Zsolt Varga; Barnabás Steinmetz; Balázs Vincze; Tamás Molnár; Tamás Kásás; Attila Vári; Tamás Marcz Head coach: Dénes Kemény	Yugoslavia Aleksandar Ćirić; Danilo Ikodinović; Dragan Jovanović; Nikola Kuljača; Aleksandar Nikolić; Dušan Popović; Dejan Savić; Aleksandar Šapić; Petar Trbojević; Veljko Uskoković; Željko Vičević; Vladimir Vujasinović; Nenad Vukanić Head coach: Nikola Stamenić
