= Spain men's Olympic water polo team records and statistics =

This article lists various water polo records and statistics in relation to the Spain men's national water polo team at the Summer Olympics.

The Spain men's national water polo team has participated in 18 of 27 official men's water polo tournaments.

== Abbreviations ==
Apps	Appearances	Rk	Rank	Ref	Reference	Cap No.	Water polo cap number
Pos	Playing position	FP	Field player	GK	Goalkeeper	ISHOF	International Swimming Hall of Fame
L/R	Handedness	L	Left-handed	R	Right-handed	Oly debut	Olympic debut in water polo
(C)	Captain	p.	page	pp.	pages		

== Team statistics ==
=== Comprehensive results by tournament ===
Notes:

- Results of Olympic qualification tournaments are not included. Numbers refer to the final placing of each team at the respective Games.
- At the 1904 Summer Olympics, a water polo tournament was contested, but only American contestants participated. Currently the International Olympic Committee (IOC) and the International Swimming Federation (FINA) consider water polo event as part of unofficial program in 1904.
- Last updated: 5 May 2021.

Legend

- 1 – Champions
- 2 – Runners-up
- 3 – Third place
- 4 – Fourth place
- — – The nation did not participate in the Games
- Q – Qualified for forthcoming tournament
- – Hosts

Men's team	00	04	08	12	20	24	28	32	36	48	52	56	60	64	68	72	76	80	84	88	92	96	00	04	08	12	16	20	Years
Spain		—	—	—	7	10	9		—	8	8	—			9	10		4	4	6	2	1	4	6	5	6	7	Q	18
Total teams	7		4	6	12	13	14	5	16	18	21	10	16	13	15	16	12	12	12	12	12	12	12	12	12	12	12	12	

=== Number of appearances ===
Last updated: 27 July 2021.

Legend

- Year^{*} – As host team

Men's team	Apps	Record streak	Active streak	Debut	Most recent	Best finish	Confederation
Spain	18	11	11	1920	2020	Champions	Europe – LEN

=== Best finishes ===
Last updated: 27 July 2021.

Legend

- Year^{*} – As host team

Men's team	Best finish	Apps	Confederation
Spain	Champions (1996)	18	Europe – LEN

=== Finishes in the top four ===
Last updated: 5 May 2021.

Legend

- Year^{*} – As host team

Men's team	Total	Champions	Runners-up	Third place	Fourth place	First	Last
Spain	5	1 (1996)	1 (1992^{*})		3 (1980, 1984, 2000)	1980	2000

=== Medal table ===
Last updated: 5 May 2021.

Men's team	Gold	Silver	Bronze	Total
Spain (ESP)	1	1	0	2

== Player statistics ==
=== Multiple appearances ===
The following table is pre-sorted by number of Olympic appearances (in descending order), year of the last Olympic appearance (in ascending order), year of the first Olympic appearance (in ascending order), date of birth (in ascending order), name of the player (in ascending order), respectively.

- Number of six-time Olympians: 1
- Number of five-time Olympians: 3
- Number of four-time Olympians: 7
- Last updated: 27 July 2021.

Legend and abbreviation

- – Hosts
- CUB – Cuba
- ESP – Spain

Male athletes who competed in water polo at four or more Olympics
Apps	Player	Birth	Pos	Water polo tournaments						Age of first/last	ISHOF member	Note	Ref
Apps	Player	Birth	Pos	1	2	3	4	5	6	Age of first/last	ISHOF member	Note	Ref
6	Manuel Estiarte	1961	FP	1980	1984	1988	1992	1996	2000	18/38	2007	Flag bearer for Spain (2000)	
5	Jordi Sans	1965	FP	1984	1988	1992	1996	2000		18/35			
5	Salvador Gómez	1968	FP	1988	1992	1996	2000	2004		20/36			
5	Jesús Rollán	1968	GK	1988	1992	1996	2000	2004		20/36	2012		
4	Pedro García	1968	FP	1988	1992	1996	2000			19/31			
4	Sergi Pedrerol	1969	FP	1992	1996	2000	2004			22/34			
4	Daniel Ballart	1973	FP	1992	1996	2000	2004			19/31			
4	Ángel Andreo	1972	GK	1996	2000	2004	2008			23/35			
4	Iván Pérez	1971	FP	1992; CUB			2004; ESP	2008; ESP	2012; ESP	21/41			
4	Guillermo Molina	1984	FP	2004	2008	2012	2016			20/32			
4	Felipe Perrone	1986	FP	2008	2012	2016	2020			22/35			

Note:

- Xavier García is listed in Croatia men's Olympic water polo team records and statistics.

=== Multiple medalists ===
The following table is pre-sorted by total number of Olympic medals (in descending order), number of Olympic gold medals (in descending order), number of Olympic silver medals (in descending order), year of receiving the last Olympic medal (in ascending order), year of receiving the first Olympic medal (in ascending order), name of the player (in ascending order), respectively.

- Number of four-time Olympic medalists: 0
- Number of three-time Olympic medalists: 0
- Last updated: 1 May 2021.

=== Top goalscorers ===
The following table is pre-sorted by number of total goals (in descending order), year of the last Olympic appearance (in ascending order), year of the first Olympic appearance (in ascending order), name of the player (in ascending order), respectively.

- Number of goalscorers (50+ goals): 1
- Number of goalscorers (40–49 goals): 2
- Number of goalscorers (30–39 goals): 4
- Last updated: 1 April 2021.

Legend and abbreviation

- – Hosts
- BRA – Brazil
- CUB – Cuba
- ESP – Spain

Male players with 30 or more goals at the Olympics
Rk	Player	Birth	L/R	Total goals	Water polo tournaments (goals)						Age of first/last	ISHOF member	Note	Ref
Rk	Player	Birth	L/R	Total goals	1	2	3	4	5	6	Age of first/last	ISHOF member	Note	Ref
1	Manuel Estiarte	1961	Right	127	1980 (21)	1984 (34)	1988 (27)	1992 (22)	1996 (13)	2000 (10)	18/38	2007	Flag bearer for Spain (2000)	
2	Felipe Perrone	1986	Right	42	2008; ESP (16)	2012; ESP (16)	2016; BRA (10)				22/30			
3	Guillermo Molina	1984	Right	41	2004 (4)	2008 (13)	2012 (5)	2016 (19)			20/32			
4	Salvador Gómez	1968	Right	37	1988 (8)	1992 (5)	1996 (12)	2000 (5)	2004 (7)		20/36			
5	Pedro García	1968		35	1988 (9)	1992 (13)	1996 (7)	2000 (6)			19/31			
6	Jordi Sans	1965		33	1984 (0)	1988 (13)	1992 (8)	1996 (7)	2000 (5)		19/35			
7	Iván Pérez	1971	Left	31	1992; CUB (16)			2004; ESP (6)	2008; ESP (3)	2012; ESP (6)	21/41			
Rk	Player	Birth	L/R	Total goals	1	2	3	4	5	6	Age of first/last	ISHOF member	Note	Ref
Rk	Player	Birth	L/R	Total goals	Water polo tournaments (goals)						Age of first/last	ISHOF member	Note	Ref

Sources:

- Official Reports (PDF): 1920–1928, 1948–1952, 1968–1972, 1980–1996;
- Official Results Books (PDF): 2000 (pp. 46, 49, 54, 65, 67, 70, 74–75), 2004 (pp. 227–228), 2008 (pp. 193–194), 2012 (pp. 474–475), 2016 (pp. 112–113).

=== Goalkeepers ===
The following table is pre-sorted by edition of the Olympics (in ascending order), cap number or name of the goalkeeper (in ascending order), respectively.

Last updated: 27 July 2021.

Legend and abbreviation

- – Hosts
- Eff % – Save efficiency (Saves / Shots)

Year	Cap No.	Goalkeeper	Birth	Age	ISHOF member	Note	Ref
1920		Luis Gibert	1903	17		Starting goalkeeper	
1920		(Unknown)					
1924		Jaime Cruells	1906	18		Starting goalkeeper	
1924		(Unknown)					
1928		Gonzalo Jiménez	1902	26		Starting goalkeeper	
1928		(Unknown)					
1948		Joan Serra	1927	20		Starting goalkeeper	
1948		(Unknown)					
1952		Leandro Ribera Abad	1934	17		Starting goalkeeper	
1952		(Unknown)					
1968	1	Luis Bestit	1945	23			
1968	11	Vicente Brugat	1947	20			
1972	1	Salvador Franch	1949	23			
1972	11	Luis Bestit (2)	1945	27			
1980	1	Manuel Delgado	1955	25			
1980	11	Salvador Franch (2)	1949	31			
1984	1	Leandro Ribera Perpiñá	1962	22			
1984	13	Mariano Moya	1963	20			
1988	1	Jesús Rollán	1968	20	2012		
1988	11	Mariano Moya (2)	1963	24			
1992 (silver)	1	Jesús Rollán (2)	1968	24	2012	Starting goalkeeper	
1992 (silver)	12	Manuel Silvestre	1965	27			
Year	Cap No.	Goalkeeper	Birth	Age	ISHOF member	Note	Ref

Year	Cap No.	Goalkeeper	Birth	Age	Saves	Shots	Eff %	ISHOF member	Note	Ref
1996 (gold)	1	Jesús Rollán (3)	1968	28	62	110	56.4%	2012	Starting goalkeeper	
1996 (gold)	4	Ángel Andreo	1972	23	0	0	—			
2000	1	Jesús Rollán (4)	1968	32	58	116	50.0%	2012	Starting goalkeeper	
2000	2	Ángel Andreo (2)	1972	27	0	0	—			
2004	1	Jesús Rollán (5)	1968	36	5	7	71.4%	2012		
2004	2	Ángel Andreo (3)	1972	31	50	92	54.3%		Starting goalkeeper	
2008	1	Iñaki Aguilar	1983	24	58	107	54.2%		Starting goalkeeper	
2008	13	Ángel Andreo (4)	1972	35	1	4	25.0%			
2012	1	Iñaki Aguilar (2)	1983	28	52	98	53.1%			
2012	13	Daniel López	1980	32	26	54	48.1%			
2016	1	Iñaki Aguilar (3)	1983	32	16	26	61.5%			
2016	13	Daniel López (2)	1980	36	63	115	54.8%		Starting goalkeeper	
2020	1	Daniel López (3)	1980	41						
2020	13	Unai Aguirre	2002	19						
Year	Cap No.	Goalkeeper	Birth	Age	Saves	Shots	Eff %	ISHOF member	Note	Ref

Sources:

- Official Reports (PDF): 1996 (pp. 57–61, 70–71, 73);
- Official Results Books (PDF): 2000 (pp. 46, 49, 54, 65, 67, 70, 74–75), 2004 (pp. 227–228), 2008 (pp. 193–194), 2012 (pp. 474–475), 2016 (pp. 112–113).

=== Top sprinters ===
The following table is pre-sorted by number of total sprints won (in descending order), year of the last Olympic appearance (in ascending order), year of the first Olympic appearance (in ascending order), name of the sprinter (in ascending order), respectively.

* Number of sprinters (30+ sprints won, since 2000): 0

- Number of sprinters (20–29 sprints won, since 2000): 1
- Number of sprinters (10–19 sprints won, since 2000): 1
- Number of sprinters (5–9 sprints won, since 2000): 1
- Last updated: 15 May 2021.

Legend and abbreviation

- – Hosts
- Eff % – Efficiency (Sprints won / Sprints contested)

Male players with 5 or more sprints won at the Olympics (statistics since 2000)
Rk	Sprinter	Birth	Total sprints won	Total sprints contested	Eff %	Water polo tournaments (sprints won / contested)					Age of first/last	ISHOF member	Note	Ref
Rk	Sprinter	Birth	Total sprints won	Total sprints contested	Eff %	1	2	3	4	5	Age of first/last	ISHOF member	Note	Ref
1	Albert Español	1985	20	35	57.1%	2012 (15/25)	2016 (5/10)				26/30			
2	Sergi Pedrerol	1969	12	38	31.6%	1992 (N/A)	1996 (N/A)	2000 (10/27)	2004 (2/11)		22/34			
3	Gonzalo Echenique	1990	8	14	57.1%	2016 (8/14)					26/26			

- Official Results Books (PDF): 2000 (pp. 46, 49, 54, 65, 67, 70, 74–75), 2004 (pp. 227–228), 2008 (pp. 193–194), 2012 (pp. 474–475), 2016 (pp. 112–113).

Note:

- Xavier García is listed in Croatia men's Olympic water polo team records and statistics.

== Coach statistics ==
=== Medals as coach and player ===
The following table is pre-sorted by total number of Olympic medals (in descending order), number of Olympic gold medals (in descending order), number of Olympic silver medals (in descending order), year of winning the last Olympic medal (in ascending order), year of winning the first Olympic medal (in ascending order), name of the person (in ascending order), respectively. Last updated: 5 May 2021.

Spanish water polo player Miki Oca won a silver medal at the 1992 Summer Olympics in Barcelona. Four years later, he won a gold medal at the 1996 Olympics in Atlanta. As a head coach, he guided Spain women's national water polo team to a silver medal at the 2012 London Olympics.

Legend

- Year^{*} – As host team

Rk	Person	Birth	Height	Player				Head coach			Total medals				Ref
Rk	Person	Birth	Height	Age	Men's team	Pos	Medal	Age	Women's team	Medal	G	S	B	T	Ref
1	Miki Oca	1970	1.87 m (6 ft 2 in)	22–26	Spain	FP	1992^{*} (silver) , 1996 (gold)	42	Spain	2012 (silver)	1	2	0	3	

== Olympic champions ==
=== 1996 Summer Olympics ===
- Edition of men's tournament: 22nd
- Host city: Atlanta, United States
- Number of participating teams: 12
- Competition format: Round-robin pools advanced teams to classification matches
- Champion: Spain (1st title; 3rd place in preliminary A group)

Match	Round	Date	Opponent	Result	Goals for	Goals against	Goal diff.
Match 1/8	Preliminary round – Group A	20 July 1996	Germany	Won	9	3	6
Match 2/8	Preliminary round – Group A	21 July 1996	Netherlands	Won	8	7	1
Match 3/8	Preliminary round – Group A	22 July 1996	Yugoslavia (Note: After the breakup of Yugoslavia, FR Yugoslavia men's national water polo team participated at the 1996 and 2000 Olympics, and won a bronze medal in 2000. In 2003, after the country was renamed from FR Yugoslavia to Serbia and Montenegro, the team was also renamed to "Serbia and Montenegro men's national water polo team".)	Lost	7	9	–2
Match 4/8	Preliminary round – Group A	23 July 1996	Hungary	Lost	7	8	–1
Match 5/8	Preliminary round – Group A	24 July 1996	Russia	Won	8	6	2
Match 6/8	Quarter-finals	26 July 1996	United States	Won	5	4	1
Match 7/8	Semi-finals	27 July 1996	Hungary	Won	7	6	1
Match 8/8	Gold medal match	28 July 1996	Croatia	Won	7	5	2
Total	Matches played: 8 • Wins: 6 • Ties: 0 • Defeats: 2 • Win %: 75.0%				58	48	10

Source: Official Reports (PDF): 1996 (p. 57, 58, 59, 60, 61, 70, 71, 73).

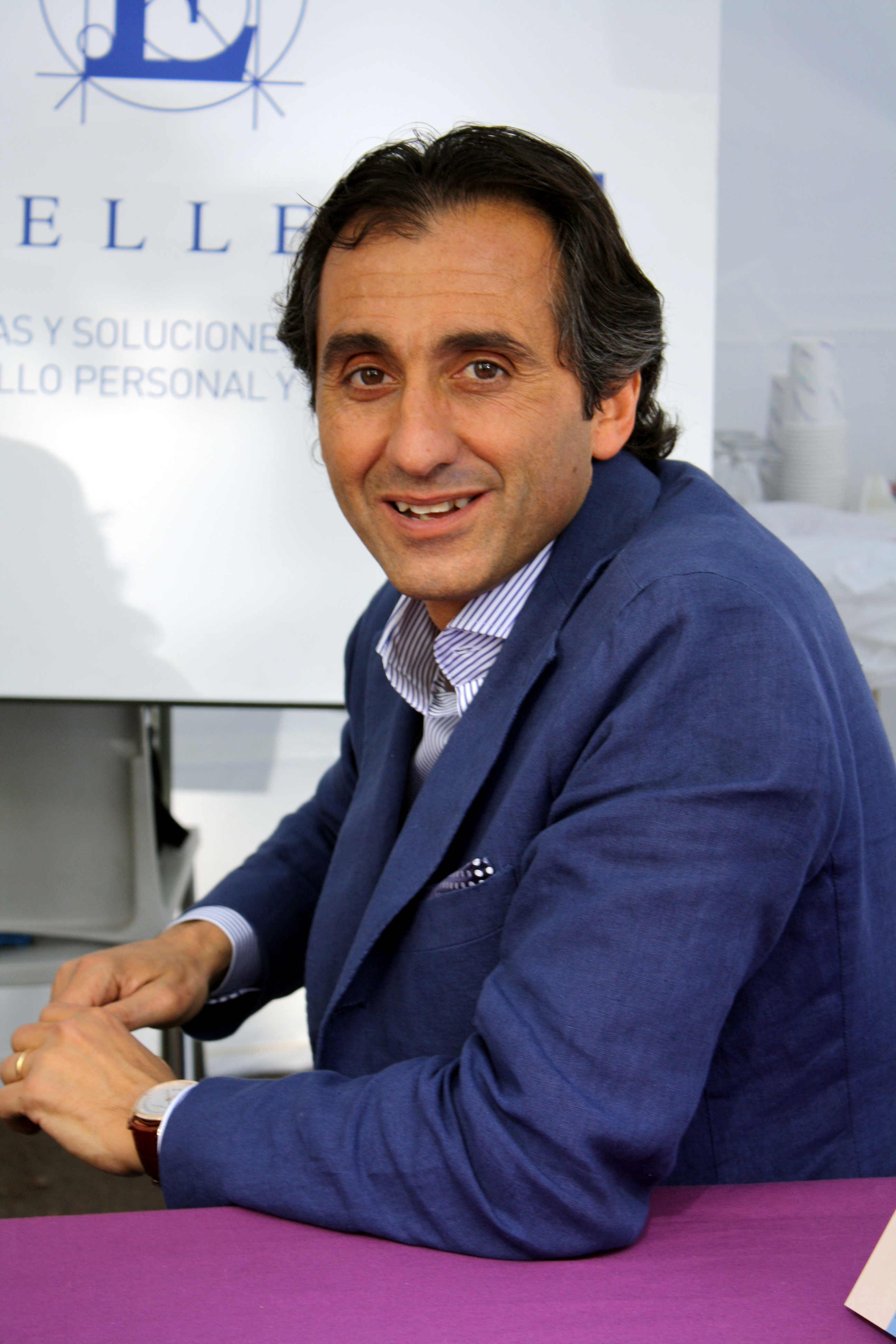
34-year-old Manuel Estiarte, the captain of Spain, won a gold medal during his fifth Olympics.

- Head coach: (Spain) Juan Jané (1st title as head coach)
- Assistant coach: (Spain) Santiago Fernandez de Cuevas

Roster
Cap No.	Player	Pos	L/R	Height	Weight	Date of birth	Age of winning gold	Oly debut	ISHOF member
1	Jesús Rollán	GK	R	1.87 m (6 ft 2 in)	87 kg (192 lb)	4 April 1968	28 years, 115 days	No	2012
2	Josep María Abarca	FP		1.86 m (6 ft 1 in)	83 kg (183 lb)	19 June 1974	22 years, 39 days	Yes	
3	Sergi Pedrerol	FP	L	1.90 m (6 ft 3 in)	78 kg (172 lb)	16 December 1969	26 years, 225 days	No	
4	Ángel Andreo	GK	R	1.91 m (6 ft 3 in)	83 kg (183 lb)	3 December 1972	23 years, 238 days	Yes	
5	Manuel Estiarte (C)	FP	R	1.78 m (5 ft 10 in)	62 kg (137 lb)	26 October 1961	34 years, 276 days	No	2007
6	Daniel Ballart	FP	R	1.78 m (5 ft 10 in)	73 kg (161 lb)	17 March 1973	23 years, 133 days	No	
7	Jorge Payá	FP		1.85 m (6 ft 1 in)	78 kg (172 lb)	10 July 1963	33 years, 18 days	No	
8	Iván Moro	FP	R	1.86 m (6 ft 1 in)	84 kg (185 lb)	25 December 1974	21 years, 216 days	Yes	
9	Jordi Sans	FP		1.80 m (5 ft 11 in)	70 kg (154 lb)	3 August 1965	30 years, 360 days	No	
10	Salvador Gómez	FP	R	1.94 m (6 ft 4 in)	96 kg (212 lb)	11 March 1968	28 years, 139 days	No	
11	Miki Oca	FP		1.87 m (6 ft 2 in)	83 kg (183 lb)	15 April 1970	26 years, 104 days	No	
12	Carles Sanz	FP		1.77 m (5 ft 10 in)	88 kg (194 lb)	25 May 1975	21 years, 64 days	Yes	
13	Pedro García	FP		1.93 m (6 ft 4 in)	83 kg (183 lb)	9 December 1968	27 years, 232 days	No	
Average				1.86 m (6 ft 1 in)	81 kg (179 lb)	23 October 1969	26 years, 279 days		
Coach	Juan Jané			1.87 m (6 ft 2 in)		31 May 1953	43 years, 58 days		

Sources:

- Official Reports (PDF): 1996 (p. 57, 58, 59, 60, 61, 70, 71, 73);
- Olympedia: 1996 (men's tournament);
- Sports Reference: 1996 (men's tournament);
- ISHOF.

Statistics
Cap No.	Player	Pos	Matches played	Goals/Shots		
Cap No.	Player	Pos	Matches played	Goals	Shots	%
1	Jesús Rollán	GK	8			
2	Josep María Abarca	FP	8	0	1	0.0%
3	Sergi Pedrerol	FP	8	1	13	7.7%
4	Ángel Andreo	GK	8			
5	Manuel Estiarte (C)	FP	8	13	33	39.4%
6	Daniel Ballart	FP	8	3	13	23.1%
7	Jorge Payá	FP	8	1	2	50.0%
8	Iván Moro	FP	8	2	15	13.3%
9	Jordi Sans	FP	8	7	18	38.9%
10	Salvador Gómez	FP	8	12	38	31.6%
11	Miki Oca	FP	8	9	27	33.3%
12	Carles Sanz	FP	8	3	11	27.3%
13	Pedro García	FP	8	7	29	24.1%
Total			8	58	200	29.0%
Against				48	200	24.0%

Cap No.	Player	Pos	Saves/Shots		
Cap No.	Player	Pos	Saves	Shots	%
1	Jesús Rollán	GK	62	110	56.4%
4	Ángel Andreo	GK			
Total			62	110	56.4%

Source: Official Reports (PDF): 1996 (p. 57, 58, 59, 60, 61, 70, 71, 73).

== Water polo people at the opening and closing ceremonies ==
=== Flag bearers ===
Some sportspeople were chosen to carry the national flag of their country at the opening and closing ceremonies of the Olympic Games. As of the 2020 Summer Olympics, one male water polo player was given the honour to carry the flag for Spain.

Six-time Olympian Manuel Estiarte of Spain was the flag bearer during the opening ceremony at the 2000 Summer Olympics in Sydney.

Legend

- 2008 O – Opening ceremony of the 2008 Summer Olympics
- 2012 C – Closing ceremony of the 2012 Summer Olympics
- – Hosts
- Flag bearer^{‡} – Flag bearer who won the tournament with his team

Water polo people who were flag bearers at the opening and closing ceremonies of the Olympic Games
#	Year	Country	Flag bearer	Birth	Age	Height	Team	Pos	Water polo tournaments						Period (age of first/last)	Medals				Ref
#	Year	Country	Flag bearer	Birth	Age	Height	Team	Pos	1	2	3	4	5	6	Period (age of first/last)	G	S	B	T	Ref
1	2000 O	Spain	Manuel Estiarte	1961	38	1.78 m (5 ft 10 in)	Spain	FP	1980	1984	1988	1992	1996	2000	20 years (18/38)	1	1	0	2	

=== Oath takers ===
Some sportspeople from the host nations were chosen to take the Olympic Oath at the opening ceremonies of the Olympic Games. As of the 2020 Summer Olympics, one water polo referee from Spain was given the honour.

Eugeni Asensio, a Spanish water polo referee, took the Officials' Oath at the 1992 Summer Olympics in Barcelona.

Legend

- – Hosts
- Oath taker^{‡} – Oath taker who won the tournament with his team

Water polo people who were oath takers at the opening ceremonies of the Olympic Games
#	Year	Oath	Country	Oath taker	Birth	Age	Water polo tournament		Ref
2	1992	Officials' Oath	Spain	Eugeni Asensio			1992	As referee (official)	

== See also ==
- Spain women's Olympic water polo team records and statistics
- List of men's Olympic water polo tournament records and statistics
- Lists of Olympic water polo records and statistics
- Spain at the Olympics

== Sources ==
=== Official Reports (IOC) ===
PDF documents in the LA84 Foundation Digital Library:

- Official Report of the 1896 Olympic Games (download, archive)
- Official Report of the 1900 Olympic Games (download, archive)
- Official Report of the 1904 Olympic Games (download, archive)
- Official Report of the 1908 Olympic Games (download, archive) (pp. 359–361)
- Official Report of the 1912 Olympic Games (download, archive) (pp. 1021–1024, 1031–1037)
- Official Report of the 1920 Olympic Games (download, archive) (p. 130)
- Official Report of the 1924 Olympic Games (download, archive) (pp. 439–440, 486–494)
- Official Report of the 1928 Olympic Games (download, archive) (pp. 746–757, 797–807)
- Official Report of the 1932 Olympic Games (download, archive) (pp. 619–623, 646–652)
- Official Report of the 1936 Olympic Games, v.2 (download, archive) (pp. 345–356)
- Official Report of the 1948 Olympic Games (download, archive) (pp. 537–540, 640–647)
- Official Report of the 1952 Olympic Games (download, archive) (pp. 600–608)
- Official Report of the 1956 Olympic Games (download, archive) (pp. 592–594, 624–627)
- Official Report of the 1960 Olympic Games (download, archive) (pp. 552–555, 617–634)
- Official Report of the 1964 Olympic Games, v.2 (download, archive) (pp. 682–698)
- Official Report of the 1968 Olympic Games, v.3 (download, archive) (pp. 449–466, 811–826)
- Official Report of the 1972 Olympic Games, v.3 (download, archive) (pp. 331, 353–365)
- Official Report of the 1976 Olympic Games, v.3 (download, archive) (pp. 446–447, 484–497)
- Official Report of the 1980 Olympic Games, v.3 (download, archive) (pp. 458, 495–510)
- Official Report of the 1984 Olympic Games, v.2 (download, archive) (pp. 528–534)
- Official Report of the 1988 Olympic Games, v.2 (download, archive) (pp. 590–598)
- Official Report of the 1992 Olympic Games, v.5 (download, archive) (pp. 354, 386–400)
- Official Report of the 1996 Olympic Games, v.3 (download, archive) (pp. 56–73)

=== Official Results Books (IOC) ===
PDF documents in the LA84 Foundation Digital Library:

- Official Results Book – 2000 Olympic Games – Water Polo (download, archive)
- Official Results Book – 2004 Olympic Games – Water Polo (download, archive)
- Official Results Book – 2008 Olympic Games – Water Polo (download, archive)

PDF documents on the FINA website:

- Official Results Book – 2012 Olympic Games – Diving, Swimming, Synchronised Swimming, Water Polo (archive) (pp. 284–507)

PDF documents in the Olympic World Library:

- Official Results Book – 2016 Olympic Games – Water Polo (archive)

PDF documents on the International Olympic Committee website:

- Official Results Book – 2020 Olympic Games – Water Polo (archive)
- Official Results Book – 2024 Olympic Games – Water Polo

=== Official Reports (FINA) ===
PDF documents on the FINA website:

- HistoFINA – Water polo medalists and statistics (as of September 2019) (archive) (pp. 4–13)
- 1870–2020 | 150 years of Water Polo – Evolution of its rules (archive)

=== Official website (IOC) ===
Water polo on the International Olympic Committee website:

- Water polo
- Men's water polo

=== Olympedia ===
Water polo on the Olympedia website:

- Water polo Archived 2021-12-28 at the Wayback Machine
- Men's water polo
- Athlete count for water polo
- Water polo venues
- Water polo at the 1900 Summer Olympics (men's tournament)
- Water polo at the 1904 Summer Olympics (men's tournament)
- Water polo at the 1908 Summer Olympics (men's tournament)
- Water polo at the 1912 Summer Olympics (men's tournament)
- Water polo at the 1920 Summer Olympics (men's tournament)
- Water polo at the 1924 Summer Olympics (men's tournament)
- Water polo at the 1928 Summer Olympics (men's tournament)
- Water polo at the 1932 Summer Olympics (men's tournament)
- Water polo at the 1936 Summer Olympics (men's tournament)
- Water polo at the 1948 Summer Olympics (men's tournament)
- Water polo at the 1952 Summer Olympics (men's tournament)
- Water polo at the 1956 Summer Olympics (men's tournament)
- Water polo at the 1960 Summer Olympics (men's tournament)
- Water polo at the 1964 Summer Olympics (men's tournament)
- Water polo at the 1968 Summer Olympics (men's tournament)
- Water polo at the 1972 Summer Olympics (men's tournament)
- Water polo at the 1976 Summer Olympics (men's tournament)
- Water polo at the 1980 Summer Olympics (men's tournament)
- Water polo at the 1984 Summer Olympics (men's tournament)
- Water polo at the 1988 Summer Olympics (men's tournament)
- Water polo at the 1992 Summer Olympics (men's tournament)
- Water polo at the 1996 Summer Olympics (men's tournament)
- Water polo at the 2000 Summer Olympics (men's tournament)
- Water polo at the 2004 Summer Olympics (men's tournament)
- Water polo at the 2008 Summer Olympics (men's tournament)
- Water polo at the 2012 Summer Olympics (men's tournament)
- Water polo at the 2016 Summer Olympics (men's tournament)
- Water polo at the 2020 Summer Olympics (men's tournament)

=== Sports Reference ===
Water polo on the Sports Reference website:

- Country Medal Leaders & Athlete Medal Leaders (1900–2016) (archived)
- Men's water polo (1900–2016) (archived)
- Water polo at the 1900 Summer Games (men's tournament) (archived)
- Water polo at the 1904 Summer Games (men's tournament) (archived)
- Water polo at the 1908 Summer Games (men's tournament) (archived)
- Water polo at the 1912 Summer Games (men's tournament) (archived)
- Water polo at the 1920 Summer Games (men's tournament) (archived)
- Water polo at the 1924 Summer Games (men's tournament) (archived)
- Water polo at the 1928 Summer Games (men's tournament) (archived)
- Water polo at the 1932 Summer Games (men's tournament) (archived)
- Water polo at the 1936 Summer Games (men's tournament) (archived)
- Water polo at the 1948 Summer Games (men's tournament) (archived)
- Water polo at the 1952 Summer Games (men's tournament) (archived)
- Water polo at the 1956 Summer Games (men's tournament) (archived)
- Water polo at the 1960 Summer Games (men's tournament) (archived)
- Water polo at the 1964 Summer Games (men's tournament) (archived)
- Water polo at the 1968 Summer Games (men's tournament) (archived)
- Water polo at the 1972 Summer Games (men's tournament) (archived)
- Water polo at the 1976 Summer Games (men's tournament) (archived)
- Water polo at the 1980 Summer Games (men's tournament) (archived)
- Water polo at the 1984 Summer Games (men's tournament) (archived)
- Water polo at the 1988 Summer Games (men's tournament) (archived)
- Water polo at the 1992 Summer Games (men's tournament) (archived)
- Water polo at the 1996 Summer Games (men's tournament) (archived)
- Water polo at the 2000 Summer Games (men's tournament) (archived)
- Water polo at the 2004 Summer Games (men's tournament) (archived)
- Water polo at the 2008 Summer Games (men's tournament) (archived)
- Water polo at the 2012 Summer Games (men's tournament) (archived)
- Water polo at the 2016 Summer Games (men's tournament) (archived)
- Water polo at the 2020 Summer Games (men's tournament) (archived)

=== Todor66 ===
Water polo on the Todor66 website:

- Water polo at the Summer Games
- Water polo at the 1900 Summer Olympics (men's tournament)
- Water polo at the 1904 Summer Olympics (men's tournament)
- Water polo at the 1908 Summer Olympics (men's tournament)
- Water polo at the 1912 Summer Olympics (men's tournament)
- Water polo at the 1920 Summer Olympics (men's tournament)
- Water polo at the 1924 Summer Olympics (men's tournament)
- Water polo at the 1928 Summer Olympics (men's tournament)
- Water polo at the 1932 Summer Olympics (men's tournament)
- Water polo at the 1936 Summer Olympics (men's tournament)
- Water polo at the 1948 Summer Olympics (men's tournament)
- Water polo at the 1952 Summer Olympics (men's tournament)
- Water polo at the 1956 Summer Olympics (men's tournament)
- Water polo at the 1960 Summer Olympics (men's tournament)
- Water polo at the 1964 Summer Olympics (men's tournament)
- Water polo at the 1968 Summer Olympics (men's tournament, men's qualification)
- Water polo at the 1972 Summer Olympics (men's tournament, men's qualification)
- Water polo at the 1976 Summer Olympics (men's tournament, men's European qualification)
- Water polo at the 1980 Summer Olympics (men's tournament, men's European qualification, men's world qualification)
- Water polo at the 1984 Summer Olympics (men's tournament, men's qualification)
- Water polo at the 1988 Summer Olympics (men's tournament, men's qualification)
- Water polo at the 1992 Summer Olympics (men's tournament, men's qualification)
- Water polo at the 1996 Summer Olympics (men's tournament, men's qualification)
- Water polo at the 2000 Summer Olympics (men's tournament, men's qualification)
- Water polo at the 2004 Summer Olympics (men's tournament, men's qualification)
- Water polo at the 2008 Summer Olympics (men's tournament, men's qualification)
- Water polo at the 2012 Summer Olympics (men's tournament, men's qualification)
- Water polo at the 2016 Summer Olympics (men's tournament, men's qualification)
- Water polo at the 2020 Summer Olympics (men's tournament, men's qualification)
- Water polo at the 2024 Summer Olympics (men's tournament, men's qualification)

=== ISHOF ===
International Swimming Hall of Fame (ISHOF) website:

- Honorees Listed by Category – Water Polo
- Honorees Listed by Category – Coaches
- Honorees Listed by Category – Contributors
- Honorees by Country
- Honorees By Last Name
