= Silvia Bosurgi =

Italian water polo player

Personal information
- Born: 17 April 1979 (age 47) Messina, Italy

Sport
- Country: Italy
- Sport: Water polo
Medal record
Olympic Games
Gold medal – first place	2004 Athens	Team competition
World Championships
Gold medal – first place	2001 Fukuoka	Team competition
Silver medal – second place	2003 Barcelona	Team competition
European Championships
Gold medal – first place	1999 Prato	Team competition
FINA World Cup
Silver medal – second place	2006 Tianjin	Team competition

Silvia Bosurgi (born 17 April 1979) is a water polo forward from Italy, who won the gold medal with the Women's National Team at the 2004 Summer Olympics in Athens, Greece.

She participated at the 2001 World Aquatics Championships, 2003 World Aquatics Championships, and 2009 World Aquatics Championships.

== See also ==
- Italy women's Olympic water polo team records and statistics
- List of Olympic champions in women's water polo
- List of Olympic medalists in water polo (women)
- List of world champions in women's water polo
- List of World Aquatics Championships medalists in water polo
