= Luis Gibert =

Spanish water polo player (1903–1979)

Personal information
- Nationality: Spanish
- Born: 3 March 1903; Barcelona, Spain
- Died: 24 January 1979 (aged 75); Barcelona, Spain

Sport
- Sport: Water polo

Luis Gibert (3 March 1903 – 24 January 1979) was a Spanish water polo player. He competed at the 1920 Summer Olympics and the 1924 Summer Olympics.

== See also ==
- Spain men's Olympic water polo team records and statistics
- List of men's Olympic water polo tournament goalkeepers
