= Rosa Estiarte =

Spanish swimmer (1959–1985)

Personal information
- Born: April 26, 1959
- Died: April 8, 1985 (aged 25)

Sport
- Sport: Swimming
- Strokes: Breaststroke

Rosa Estiarte (26 April 1959 – 8 April 1985) was a Spanish breaststroke swimmer. She competed in the 1976 Olympics in the 4 × 100 m medley relay, where her Spanish team finished third in Heat 1.

Rosa died at the age of 25 on 8 April 1985. The cause of death was suicide.

== Family ==
Rosa had two brothers – Manuel and Albert – both of whom have been involved in water polo at the highest level. Manuel is considered to be one of the greatest water polo players of all time and was Spain's flag-bearer at the 2000 Olympics before teaming up with football manager Pep Guardiola to act as his assistant at both Bayern Munich and Manchester City. Albert was for many years the medical officer for the Spanish water polo teams at the Summer Olympics, and is director of a leading sports clinic.
