= Iñaki Aguilar =

Spanish water polo player (born 1983)

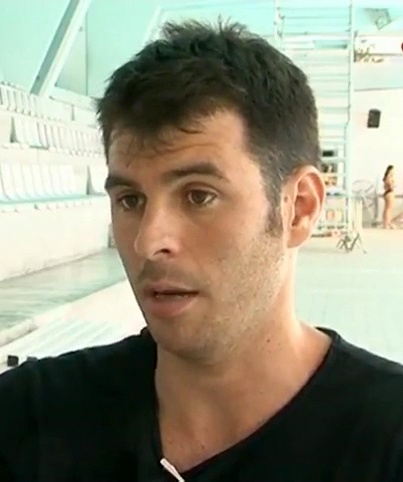

Personal information
- Full name: Iñaki Aguilar Vicente
- Nationality: Spanish
- Born: 9 September 1983 (age 43)
- Height: 189 cm (74 in)
- Weight: 82 kg (181 lb)

Sport
- Sport: Water polo
- Position: Goalkeeper
- Number: 1

Senior clubs
- Years: Team
- –: Club Natació Barcelona
- –: Club Natació Sabadell
- –: Club Natació Terrassa
National team
- Years: Team
- 2003-2017: Spain
Medal record
Men's water polo
Representing Spain
World Championships
Silver medal – second place	2009 Rome	Team competition
Bronze medal – third place	2007 Melbourne	Team competition
European Championship
Bronze medal – third place	2006 Belgrade	Team competition

Iñaki Aguilar Vicente (born 9 September 1983) is a Spanish water polo player who competed in the 2008 Summer Olympics, 2012 Summer Olympics.2012 Summer Olympics. and 2016 Summer Olympics.

== See also ==
- Spain men's Olympic water polo team records and statistics
- List of men's Olympic water polo tournament goalkeepers
- List of World Aquatics Championships medalists in water polo
