= Roberto Calcaterra =

Italian water polo player

Personal information
- Born: 6 February 1972 (age 54) Civitavecchia, Italy
Medal record
Men's water polo
Representing Italy
Olympic Games
Bronze medal – third place	1996 Atlanta	Team competition
World Championships
Gold medal – first place	1994 Rome	Team competition
Silver medal – second place	2003 Barcelona	Team competition
European Championships
Gold medal – first place	1993 Sheffield	Team competition
Gold medal – first place	1995 Vienna	Team competition
World Cup
Silver medal – second place	1995 Atlanta	Team competition
Silver medal – second place	1999 Sydney	Team competition

Roberto Calcaterra (born 6 February 1972) is a retired water polo defense player from Italy, who represented his native country at the 1996 Summer Olympics in Atlanta, Georgia. There, he won the bronze medal with the men's national team. Calcaterra also competed at the 2004 Summer Olympics in Athens, Greece.

== See also ==
- List of Olympic medalists in water polo (men)
- List of world champions in men's water polo
- List of World Aquatics Championships medalists in water polo
