= Jorge Payá =

Spanish water polo player (born 1963)

Personal information
- Born: 10 July 1963 (age 62) Manresa, Catalonia, Spain

Sport
- Sport: Water polo
Medal record
Representing Spain
Olympic Games
Gold medal – first place	1996 Atlanta	Team competition
World Championships
Silver medal – second place	1994 Rome	Team competition

Jorge "Jordi" Payá Rodríguez (born 10 July 1963) is a former water polo player from Spain, who was a member of the national team that won the gold medal at the 1996 Summer Olympics in Atlanta, Georgia. It was his second Olympic appearance, having made his debut in 1988 (Seoul).

== See also ==
- Spain men's Olympic water polo team records and statistics
- List of Olympic champions in men's water polo
- List of Olympic medalists in water polo (men)
- List of World Aquatics Championships medalists in water polo
