= Leandro Ribera Perpiñá =

Spanish water polo player (born 1962)

Personal information
- Nationality: Spanish
- Born: 2 August 1962 (age 62); Barcelona, Spain

Sport
- Sport: Water polo

Leandro Ribera Perpiñá (born 2 August 1962) is a Spanish water polo player. He competed in the men's tournament at the 1984 Summer Olympics.

== See also ==
- Spain men's Olympic water polo team records and statistics
- List of men's Olympic water polo tournament goalkeepers
