= Eugeni Asensio =

Spanish water polo sports official

Eugeni Asensio (born 1937) is a Spanish water polo sports official best known for taking the Judge's Oath at the 1992 Summer Olympics in Barcelona.

== See also ==
- Spain men's Olympic water polo team records and statistics
