= Leandro Ribera Abad =

Spanish water polo player (1934–2016)

Personal information
- Born: 27 August 1934; Barcelona, Spain
- Died: 7 June 2016 (aged 81); Barcelona, Spain

Sport
- Sport: Water polo

Leandro Ribera Abad (27 August 1934 – 7 June 2016) was a Spanish water polo player. He competed in the men's tournament at the 1952 Summer Olympics.

== See also ==
- Spain men's Olympic water polo team records and statistics
- List of men's Olympic water polo tournament goalkeepers
