= Josep María Abarca =

Spanish water polo player (born 1974)

Josep María Abarca Platas
Personal information
- Born: 19 June 1974 (age 52) Barcelona, Spain

Sport
- Sport: Water polo
Medal record
Olympic Games
Gold medal – first place	1996 Atlanta	Team

Josep María Abarca Platas (born 19 June 1974) is a Spanish water polo player. He was a member of the national team that won the gold medal at the 1996 Summer Olympics in Atlanta, Georgia.

== See also ==
- Spain men's Olympic water polo team records and statistics
- List of Olympic champions in men's water polo
- List of Olympic medalists in water polo (men)
