= Salvador Franch =

Spanish water polo player (born 1949)

Personal information
- Nationality: Spanish
- Born: 18 April 1949 (age 76); Barcelona, Spain

Sport
- Sport: Water polo

Salvador Franch (born 18 April 1949) is a Spanish water polo player. He competed at the 1972 Summer Olympics and the 1980 Summer Olympics.

== See also ==
- Spain men's Olympic water polo team records and statistics
- List of men's Olympic water polo tournament goalkeepers
