= Luis Bestit =

Spanish water polo player (born 1945)

Personal information
- Nationality: Spanish
- Born: 23 July 1945 (age 79); Barcelona, Spain

Sport
- Sport: Water polo

Luis Bestit (born 23 July 1945) is a Spanish water polo player. He competed at the 1968 Summer Olympics and the 1972 Summer Olympics.

== See also ==
- Spain men's Olympic water polo team records and statistics
- List of men's Olympic water polo tournament goalkeepers
