= Leonardo Sottani =

Italian water polo player (born 1973)

Personal information
- Born: 1 November 1973 (age 52) Figline Valdarno
Medal record
Men's water polo
Representing Italy
Olympic Games
Bronze medal – third place	1996 Atlanta	Team competition
FINA World Cup
Silver medal – second place	1999 Sydney	Team competition

Leonardo Sottani (born 1 November 1973) is a retired water polo player from Italy, who represented his native country at the 1996 Summer Olympics in Atlanta, Georgia. There the attacking forward (1m97) was a member of the men's national team that claimed the bronze medal. He participated at the 1996, 2000, and 2008 Summer Olympics representing the Italian National Waterpolo team.

He played for the most successful waterpolo team in the world, Pro Recco, and helped the team win the Italian League and Coppa Italia in 2006 and 2007. He also played for RN Florentia.

== See also ==
- Italy men's Olympic water polo team records and statistics
- List of Olympic medalists in water polo (men)
- List of men's Olympic water polo tournament top goalscorers
