= Gonzalo Jiménez =

Spanish water polo player (1902–1992)

Personal information
- Born: June 30, 1902; Barcelona, Spain
- Died: August 27, 1992 (aged 90); Barcelona, Spain

Sport
- Sport: Water polo

Gonzalo Jiménez Corral (30 June 1902 – 27 August 1992) was a Spanish water polo player. He competed in the 1928 Summer Olympics, and was also part of the Spanish team in the 1928 tournament. He played in the only match for Spain as a goalkeeper.

== See also ==
- Spain men's Olympic water polo team records and statistics
- List of men's Olympic water polo tournament goalkeepers
