= Vicente Brugat =

Spanish water polo player (born 1947)

Personal information
- Nationality: Spanish
- Born: 27 November 1947 (age 77); Barcelona, Spain

Sport
- Sport: Water polo

Vicente Brugat (born 27 November 1947) is a Spanish water polo player. He competed in the men's tournament at the 1968 Summer Olympics.

== See also ==
- Spain men's Olympic water polo team records and statistics
- List of men's Olympic water polo tournament goalkeepers
