= Mariano Moya =

Spanish water polo player (born 1963)

Personal information
- Nationality: Spanish
- Born: 10 October 1963 (age 61)

Sport
- Sport: Water polo

Mariano Moya (born 10 October 1963) is a Spanish water polo player. He competed at the 1984 Summer Olympics and the 1988 Summer Olympics.

== See also ==
- Spain men's Olympic water polo team records and statistics
- List of men's Olympic water polo tournament goalkeepers
