= George Mavrotas =

Greek water polo player

George Mavrotas OLY
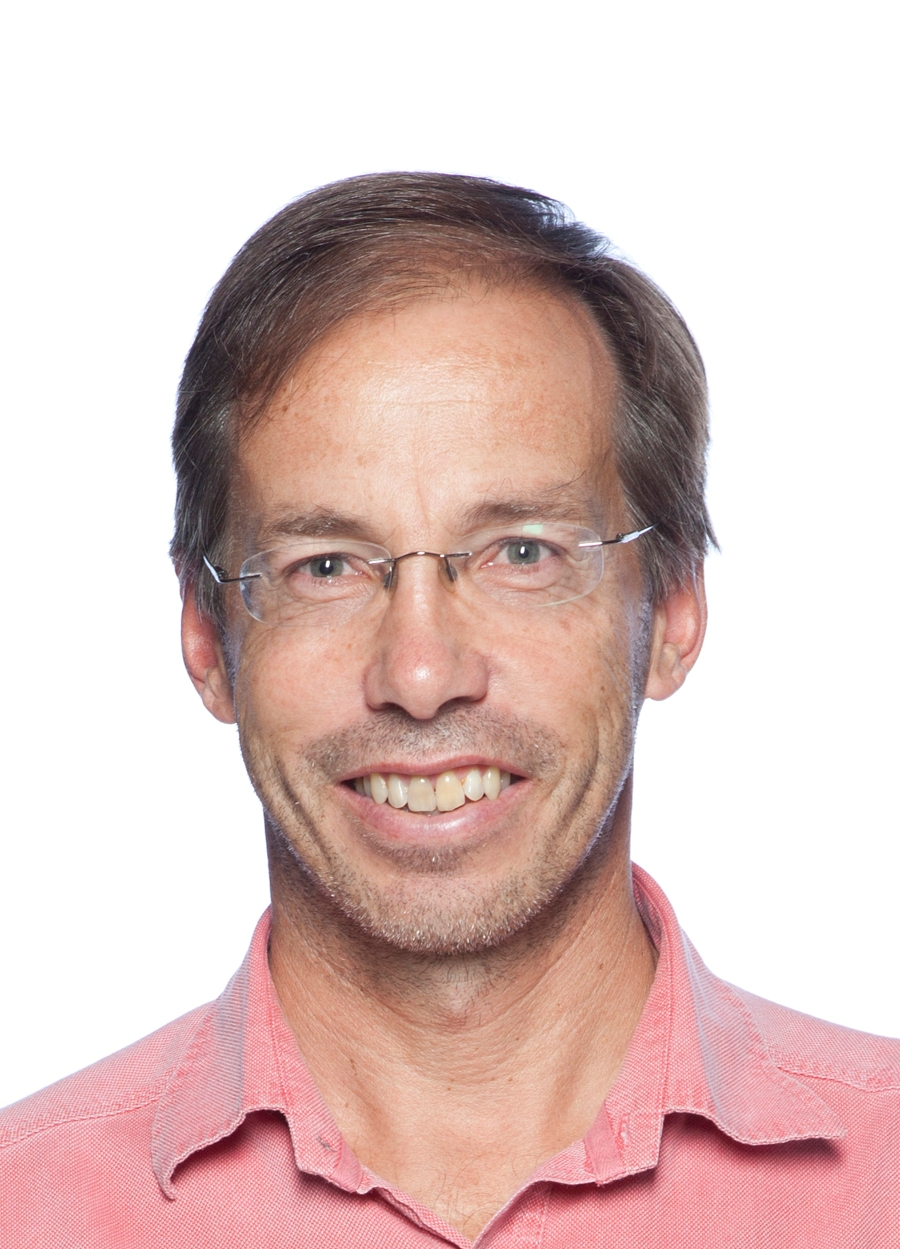
- Born: April 4, 1967 (age 59); Athens, Greece
- Political party: The River

George Mavrotas (Greek: Γιώργος Μαυρωτάς; born 4 April 1967) is a former member of the Greek Parliament, while also being a retired Greek water polo player and associate professor in the School of Chemical Engineering at the National Technical University of Athens. In July 2019 he was designated as General Secretary of Sport in the Greek Government.

== Career ==
Mavrotas played in five consecutive Summer Olympics for his native country from 1984 to 2000. He is, jointly with Spaniard Chiqui Sans, the fifth athlete to compete in water polo at five Olympics, after Briton Paul Radmilovic, Hungarian Dezső Gyarmati, Italian Gianni De Magistris, and Spaniard Manuel Estiarte. He is, jointly with shooter Agi Kassoumi, the fourth Greek to compete at five modern Olympics, after shooters Ioannis Theofilakis and Alexandros Theofilakis and sailor Tasos Bountouris.

Mavrotas played 511 times for the Greece men's national water polo team (a national record for team sports) and is among a few water polo players worldwide who have participated in five Olympic Games, just one behind the sport legend Manuel Estiarte. His major career achievements is the second place in the 1997 World Cup as captain of the national team, and the first place in the European Cup of Cup Winners also in 1997, with his club Nautical Club of Vouliagmeni. In 1999, he participated in the world selection team. From 2003 to 2009, he was member of the Greek Anti-Doping Organization (ESKAN). Mavrotas is now following an academic career, as an associate professor in the School of Chemical Engineering at the National Technical University of Athens with expertise in Operational Research.

In January 2015 he was elected as member of the Greek Parliament with the pro-European, reforming party "To Potami" (The River).

In addition to his athletic career, in 1990 he completed his studies at the National Technical University of Athens (NTUA) at the School of Chemical Engineering. In 2000 he received his doctorate from the National Technical University of Athens (NTUA) in the field of operational research. In December 2003 he began his academic career at the Laboratory of Industrial & Energy Economics at the School of Chemical Engineering of the NTUA, and today he is associate professor.

Since 1994 he has been married to Fani Stathakopoulou and has two sons, Leonidas and Aris.

In 2010 he wrote the novel "Theorem of Seven" containing a number of autobiographical details and focuses on the importance of friendship, collective effort, victory and defeat.

In 2014 he returned to active action and played in the A1 championship with the Hydraikos team.

In 2014 he was a candidate for the European Parliament with The River.

On 25 January 2015 he was elected a member of the Greek Parliament (the Attica Region) of the River (To Potami).

From January 2018 until June 2019, he was chairman in the Subcommittee on Education, Youth and Sport of the Parliamentary Assembly of Council of Europe

In July 2019 he was designated as Secretary General of Sport in the Greek Government. In June 2021 he was elected chairman of the Follow-Up Committee of the Macolin Convention against the manipulation of sport competitions of the Council of Europe and he was re-elected in the same position for a second term in May 2023. In July 2023, he was also designated for a second term as Secretary General of Sport in the Greek Government.

== See also ==
- Greece men's Olympic water polo team records and statistics
- List of athletes with the most appearances at Olympic Games
- List of players who have appeared in multiple men's Olympic water polo tournaments
