= Salvador Gómez (water polo) =

Spanish water polo player (born 1968)

Personal information
- Full name: Salvador E. Gómez Agüera
- Born: 11 March 1968 (age 58) Santander, Spain
Medal record
Men's water polo
Representing Spain
Olympic Games
Gold medal – first place	1996 Atlanta	Team competition
Silver medal – second place	1992 Barcelona	Team competition
World Championships
Gold medal – first place	1998 Perth	Team competition
Gold medal – first place	2001 Fukuoka	Team competition
FINA World Cup
Bronze medal – third place	1999 Sydney	Team competition
European Championships
Silver medal – second place	1991 Athens	Team competition
Bronze medal – third place	1993 Sheffield	Team competition

Salvador E. Gómez Agüera (born 11 March 1968 in Santander, Cantabria) is a former water polo player from Spain. He was a member of the national team that won the gold medal at the 1996 Summer Olympics in Atlanta, Georgia.

Four years earlier, when Barcelona hosted the Summer Olympics, he was on the squad that captured the silver medal. Gómez, nicknamed Chava, competed in five Summer Olympics from 1988 to 2004. He is among four Spanish water polo players, all in the 1992 and 1996 medal winning teams, to have competed at five Olympics – the others are Manuel Estiarte, Chiqui Sans and Jesús Rollán.

He made his debut for the national side at the 1987 European Championships in Strasbourg. With the Spanish national team he also won the world title twice, in Perth 1998 and Fukuoka 2001.

== See also ==
- Spain men's Olympic water polo team records and statistics
- List of athletes with the most appearances at Olympic Games
- List of players who have appeared in multiple men's Olympic water polo tournaments
- List of Olympic champions in men's water polo
- List of Olympic medalists in water polo (men)
- List of men's Olympic water polo tournament top goalscorers
- List of world champions in men's water polo
- List of World Aquatics Championships medalists in water polo
