= Jaime Cruells =

Spanish water polo player (1906–1968)

Personal information
- Nationality: Spanish
- Born: 11 April 1906; Barcelona, Spain
- Died: 21 July 1968 (aged 62); Barcelona, Spain

Sport
- Sport: Water polo

Jaime Cruells (11 April 1906 – 21 July 1968) was a Spanish water polo player. He competed at the 1924 Summer Olympics and the 1928 Summer Olympics.

== See also ==
- Spain men's Olympic water polo team records and statistics
- List of men's Olympic water polo tournament goalkeepers
