= Ángel Andreo =

Spanish water polo player (born 1972)

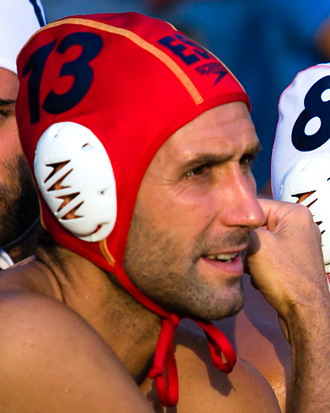
- Andreo in 2008

Personal information
- Full name: Ángel Luis Andreo Gabán
- Born: 3 December 1972 (age 53) Madrid, Spain
Medal record
Men's water polo
Representing Spain
Olympic Games
Gold medal – first place	1996 Atlanta	Team competition
World Championships
Gold medal – first place	2001 Fukuoka	Team competition
Bronze medal – third place	2007 Melbourne	Team competition
European Championship
Bronze medal – third place	2006 Belgrade	Team competition
Mediterranean Games
Gold medal – first place	2005 Almería	Team competition

Ángel Luis Andreo Gabán (born 3 December 1972 in Madrid) is a Spanish water polo, who was a member of the national team that won the gold medal at the 1996 Summer Olympics in Atlanta, Georgia. He also competed for his native country in the Summer Games of 2000 and 2004.

== See also ==
- Spain men's Olympic water polo team records and statistics
- List of Olympic champions in men's water polo
- List of Olympic medalists in water polo (men)
- List of players who have appeared in multiple men's Olympic water polo tournaments
- List of men's Olympic water polo tournament goalkeepers
- List of world champions in men's water polo
- List of World Aquatics Championships medalists in water polo
