= Jesús Rollán =

Spanish water polo player (1968–2006)

Personal information
- Full name: Jesús Miguel Rollán Prada
- Born: 4 April 1968
- Died: 11 March 2006 (aged 37)
Medal record
Men's water polo
Representing Spain
Olympic Games
Gold medal – first place	1996 Atlanta	Team competition
Silver medal – second place	1992 Barcelona	Team competition
World Championships
Gold medal – first place	1998 Perth	Team competition
Gold medal – first place	2001 Fukuoka	Team competition
FINA World Cup
Bronze medal – third place	1999 Sydney	Team competition
European Championships
Silver medal – second place	1991 Athens	Team competition

Jesús Miguel Rollán Prada (4 April 1968 – 11 March 2006) was a water polo goalkeeper from Spain who was a member of the national team that won the gold medal at the 1996 Summer Olympics in Atlanta, Georgia.

Four years earlier, when Barcelona hosted the Summer Olympics, he was on the squad that captured the silver medal. Born in Madrid, Rollán competed in five Summer Olympics, starting in 1988. He is among four Spanish water polo players, all in the 1992 and 1996 medal winning teams, to have competed at five Olympics, the others being Manuel Estiarte, Chiqui Sans and Chava Gomez. Rollán is the first water polo goalkeeper of either gender to compete at five Olympics.

He was also known as a close friend of Infanta Cristina, whom he introduced to her future husband Iñaki Urdangarin.

Rollán died on 11 March 2006 after a fall from a terrace at a spa near Barcelona. He was at the spa receiving treatment for depression. The fees for the spa were being paid for by the Spanish Olympic Committee.

== See also ==
- Spain men's Olympic water polo team records and statistics
- List of athletes with the most appearances at Olympic Games
- List of players who have appeared in multiple men's Olympic water polo tournaments
- List of Olympic champions in men's water polo
- List of Olympic medalists in water polo (men)
- List of men's Olympic water polo tournament goalkeepers
- List of world champions in men's water polo
- List of World Aquatics Championships medalists in water polo
- List of members of the International Swimming Hall of Fame
