= Guillermo Molina =

Spanish water polo player (born 1984)

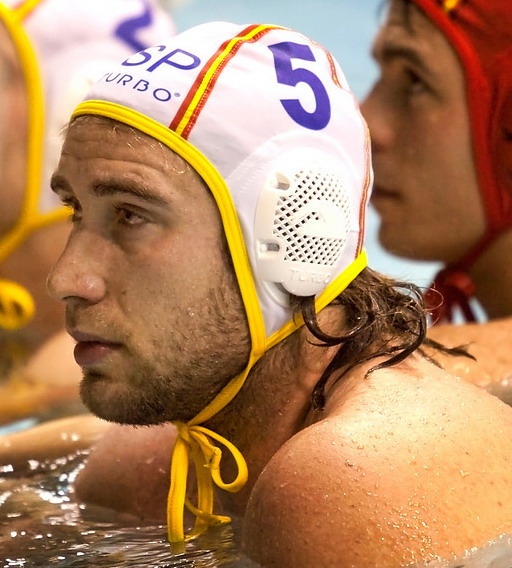

Personal information
- Full name: Guillermo Molina Ríos
- Nationality: Italy
- Born: 16 March 1984 (age 42) Ceuta, Spain
- Height: 195 cm (77 in)
- Weight: 105 kg (231 lb)

Sport
- Sport: Water polo
- Handedness: Right
- Position: Driver
National team
- Years: Team
- 2001–2016 2018: Spain; Italy
Medal record
Men's water polo
Representing Spain
World Championship
Gold medal – first place	2001 Fukuoka	Team
Silver medal – second place	2009 Rome	Team
Bronze medal – third place	2007 Melbourne	Team
FINA World Cup
Bronze medal – third place	2006 Budapest	Team
Bronze medal – third place	2010 Oradea	Team
European Championship
Bronze medal – third place	2006 Belgrade	Team
- Updated on 12 March 2020

Guillermo Molina Ríos (born 16 March 1984) is a Spanish water polo player who competed for the Spain men's national water polo team in four consecutive Summer Olympics (2004 Athens, 2008 Beijing, 2012 London and 2016 Rio. He was the joint top goalscorer at the 2016 Olympics, with 19 goals. Afterwards he competed for Italy men's national water polo team in the 2018 Men's European Water Polo Championship. He helped Italian water polo club Pro Recco win the LEN Champions League in 2009–10 and 2011–12 season.

== See also ==
- Spain men's Olympic water polo team records and statistics
- List of players who have appeared in multiple men's Olympic water polo tournaments
- List of men's Olympic water polo tournament top goalscorers
- List of world champions in men's water polo
- List of World Aquatics Championships medalists in water polo
