= Marco Gerini =

Italian water polo player

Personal information
- Born: 5 August 1971 (age 54) Rome, Italy

Sport
- Sport: Water polo
Medal record
Representing Italy
Olympic Games
Bronze medal – third place	1996 Atlanta	Team competition
World Championships
Silver medal – second place	2003 Barcelona	Team competition

Marco Gerini (born 5 August 1971) is an Italian water polo player who competed in the 1996 Summer Olympics and 2004 Summer Olympics.

== See also ==
- Italy men's Olympic water polo team records and statistics
- List of Olympic medalists in water polo (men)
- List of men's Olympic water polo tournament goalkeepers
- List of World Aquatics Championships medalists in water polo
