= Daniel Moro =

Spanish water polo player (born 1973)

Personal information
- Full name: Daniel Moro Fernández
- Nationality: Spanish
- Born: 8 August 1973 (age 53) Madrid, Spain
- Height: 1.88 m (6 ft 2 in)
- Weight: 86 kg (190 lb)

Sport
- Sport: Water polo
- Position: driver

Senior clubs
- Years: Team
- ?-?: CN Atlètic-Barceloneta
National team
- Years: Team
- ?-?: Spain
Medal record
Representing Spain
World Championships
Gold medal – first place	2001 Fukuoka	Team competition

Daniel Moro Fernández (Note: In this Spanish name, the first or paternal surname is Moro and the second or maternal family name is Fernández.) (born 8 August 1973) is a Spanish male water polo player. He was a member of the Spain men's national water polo team, playing as a driver. He was a part of the team at the 2000 Summer Olympics and 2004 Summer Olympics. On club level he played for CN Atlètic-Barceloneta in Spain.

He is the older brother of water polo player Iván Moro, who competed together with him at the 2000 and 2004 Summer Olympics after winning the gold medal at the 1996 Summer Olympics.

== See also ==
- List of world champions in men's water polo
- List of World Aquatics Championships medalists in water polo
