= Iván Pérez (water polo) =

Spanish water polo player (born 1971)

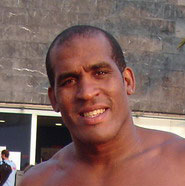

Personal information
- Full name: Iván Ernesto Pérez Vargas
- Born: 29 June 1971 (age 54) Havana, Cuba
Medal record
Men's water polo
Representing Spain
World Championships
Gold medal – first place	1998 Perth	Team competition
Gold medal – first place	2001 Fukuoka	Team competition
Silver medal – second place	2009 Rome	Team competition
Bronze medal – third place	2007 Melbourne	Team competition
European Championship
Bronze medal – third place	2006 Belgrade	Team competition
FINA World Cup
Bronze medal – third place	1999 Sydney	Team competition
Bronze medal – third place	2006 Budapest	Team competition
Mediterranean Games
Gold medal – first place	2005 Almería	Team competition

Iván Ernesto Pérez Vargas (born 29 June 1971) is a water polo player from Spain. He was born in Havana, Cuba, but became a Spanish citizen. He was a member of the national team that finished in sixth place at the 2004 Summer Olympics in Athens, Greece. He also competed at the 2008 and 2012 Olympics. He represented Cuba at the 1992 Summer Olympics.

In 2003 Pérez, a player from CN Barcelona, ended up in fifth place with the national side at the 2003 World Aquatics Championships in his home town of Barcelona. He twice won the world title with Spain, at the 1998 World Aquatics Championships in Perth, Western Australia, and at the 2001 World Aquatics Championships in Fukuoka, Japan.

== See also ==
- Spain men's Olympic water polo team records and statistics
- List of players who have appeared in multiple men's Olympic water polo tournaments
- List of men's Olympic water polo tournament top goalscorers
- List of World Aquatics Championships medalists in water polo
- List of world champions in men's water polo
