= Pedro García Aguado =

Spanish water polo player (born 1968)

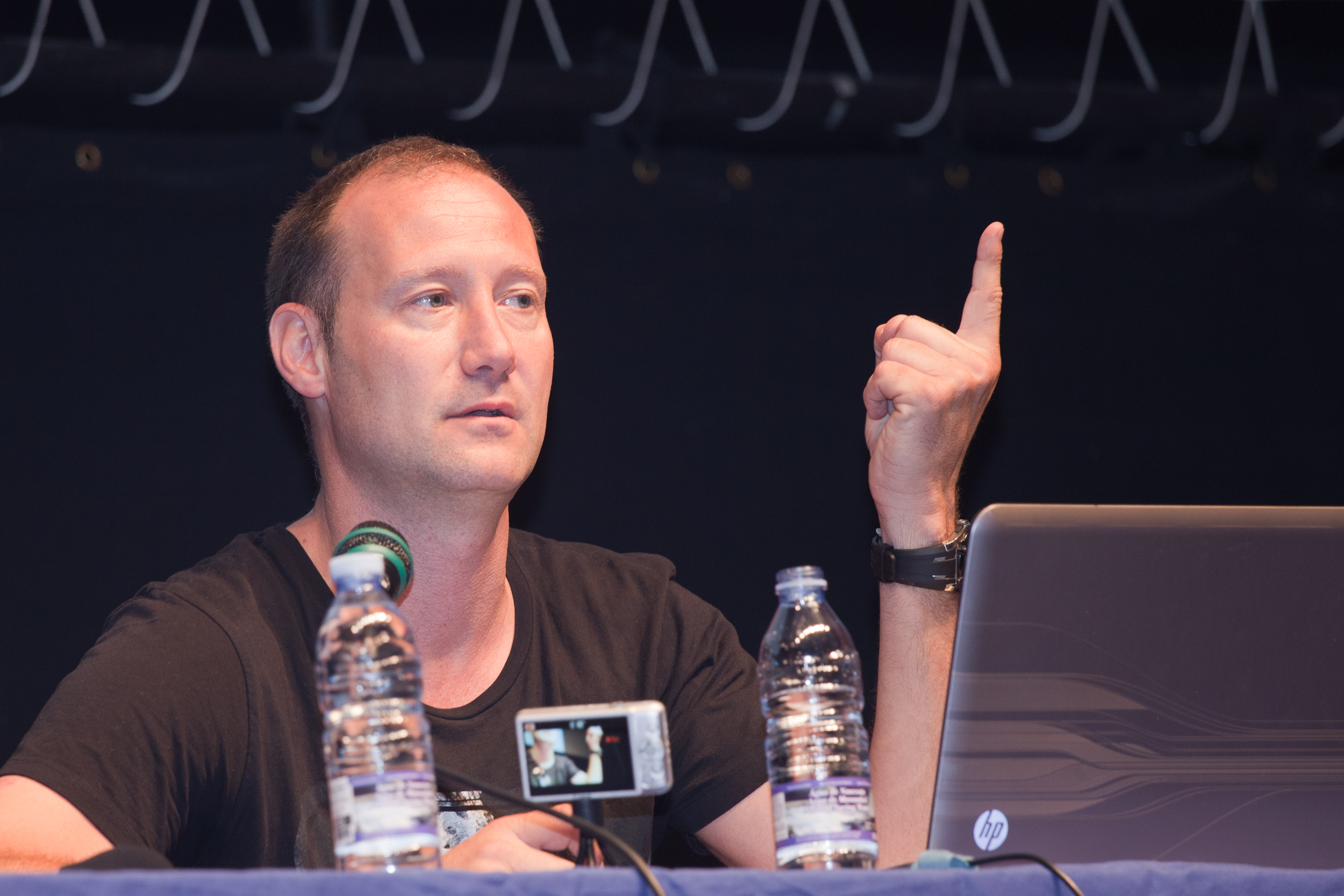
- García Aguado in 2011

Personal information
- Full name: Pedro Francisco García Aguado
- National team: Spain
- Born: 9 December 1968 (age 57) Madrid, Spain
- Occupation(s): Water polo player Television personality
- Years active: 1980–present
- Height: 193 cm (6 ft 4 in)
- Weight: 92 kg (203 lb; 14 st 7 lb)

Sport
- Sport: Water polo (1980–2001)
Medal record
Men's water polo
Representing Spain
Olympic Games
Gold medal – first place	1996 Atlanta	Team competition
Silver medal – second place	1992 Barcelona	Team competition
World Championships
Gold medal – first place	1998 Perth	Team competition
World Cup
Bronze medal – third place	1999 Sydney	Team competition
European Championships
Silver medal – second place	1991 Athens	Team competition
Bronze medal – third place	1993 Sheffield	Team competition

Pedro Francisco García Aguado (born 9 December 1968) is a Spanish former water polo player and TV personality.

He was a member of the national team that won the gold medal at the 1996 Summer Olympics in Atlanta, Georgia. Four years earlier, when Barcelona hosted the Games, he was on the side that won the silver medal. In total, García competed in four consecutive Summer Olympics, starting in 1988.

After his retirement from sports, he has had a successful second career in TV, coming back into the public conscience on Cuatro reality show Hermano mayor. After presenting other shows on the Mediaset network, he moved to Atresmedia, before becoming Director of Youth for the Community of Madrid. In 2024, he won the reality show Supervivientes.

== Biography ==
=== Early life and sporting career ===
Born in Madrid in 1968, he is the youngest of three brothers. His parents divorced when he was 12. His older brothers were swimmers, and he did the same in his youth. Later, he turned to water polo for the school for which he played in Madrid, Mariano García. In 1986, he moved to Barcelona aged 17 with other successful water polo athletes from Madrid with a view to the 1992 Olympics, to be held in Barcelona. He resided in the Centro de Alto Rendimiento in Sant Cugat del Vallès with other Spanish sports stars, and later the Residencia Joaquín Blume in Esplugues de Llobregat.

He played for the national team 565 times, including at four Olympic Games from 1988 until 2000. He became an Olympic champion with the Spanish team in 1996 and runner-up at home in 1992, as well as world champion in 1998 and runner-up twice in 1991 and 1994.

He played for six national clubs and won a total of seven national titles and six cups. He also won the LEN Cup, one LEN Cup Winners' Cup and two LEN Super Cups. In 2001, he was named the best player in Spain.

=== TV career ===
After his retirement, García Aguado went into TV presenting. His first and biggest success was the reality show Hermano mayor on Cuatro, where he served as a mediator between teenagers and families in conflict. This led him to present El campamento, the Spanish version of Brat Camp, and in 2015 became a judge on Telecinco talent show Levántate.

In September 2015, he swapped to Atresmedia to host documentary series Cazadores de trolls on LaSexta. It was broadcast in 2017, along with La Isla, which returned for a second series in 2020. In November 2018, he left the network after his contract was not renewed.

In 2018, he was given the Professional Merit award from the Diario de Mediación for his work on Hermano mayor.

In 2019, he became the Director-General of Youth for the Community of Madrid, appointed by regional president Isabel Díaz Ayuso having supported her in the election campaign, saying "I can't quite believe it, I'm very surprised and thankful to Ayuso and Ossorio." He left the position in February 2020, saying that he would be more helpful closer to affected families.

In 2023, he was a surprise guest on Gran Hermano VIP, joining as a fake housemate. In 2024, he joined the cast of Supervivientes, and eventually won the series. He has since stayed with Telecinco's reality shows, joining the cast of chat show Fiesta and was a guest on the Gran Hermano reboot.

== Filmography ==
=== Television ===
Year	Programme	Channel	Role
2009-2015	Hermano mayor	Cuatro	Presenter
2010-2011	El campamento	Cuatro	Presenter
2014-2015	En la caja	Cuatro	Presenter
2015	Levántate	Telecinco	Judge
2017	Cazadores de trolls	LaSexta	Presenter
2017	Eso que te ahorras	Antena 3	Presenter
2017-2020	La Isla	LaSexta	Presenter
2020	Desde hoy un año	Antena 3	Presenter
2023	Así es la vida	Telecinco	Collaborator
2023	La última noche	Telecinco	Collaborator
2023	Gran Hermano VIP	Telecinco	Fake housemate
2024	Supervivientes	Telecinco	Contestant (1st place)
2024–present	Fiesta	Telecinco	Collaborator
2024	Gran Hermano	Telecinco	Collaborator

== See also ==
- Spain men's Olympic water polo team records and statistics
- List of Olympic champions in men's water polo
- List of Olympic medalists in water polo (men)
- List of players who have appeared in multiple men's Olympic water polo tournaments
- List of men's Olympic water polo tournament top goalscorers
- List of world champions in men's water polo
- List of World Aquatics Championships medalists in water polo
