= Carles Sans =

Spanish water polo player (born 1975)

Personal information
- Born: May 25, 1975 (age 51) Barcelona, Spain

Sport
- Sport: Water polo
Medal record
Representing Spain
Olympic Games
| Gold medal – first place | 1996 Atlanta | Team competition |
World Championships
| Gold medal – first place | 1998 Perth | Team competition |
| Gold medal – first place | 2001 Fukuoka | Team competition |

Carles Sans López (born 25 May 1975) is a former water polo player from Spain, who was a member of the national team that won the gold medal at the 1996 Summer Olympics in Atlanta, United States.

== See also ==
- Spain men's Olympic water polo team records and statistics
- List of Olympic champions in men's water polo
- List of Olympic medalists in water polo (men)
- List of world champions in men's water polo
- List of World Aquatics Championships medalists in water polo
