= Jordi Sans =

Spanish water polo player (born 1965)

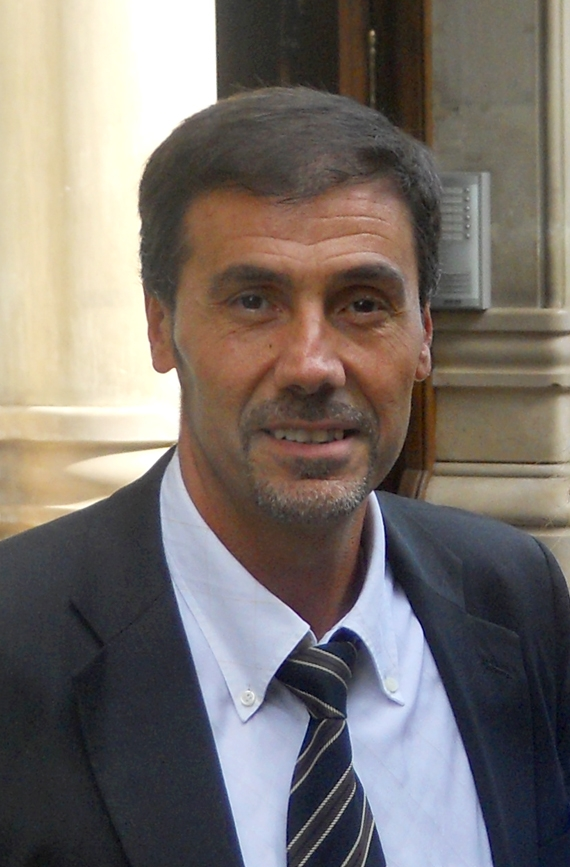

Personal information
- Full name: Jordi Sans Juan
- Born: August 3, 1965 (age 60) Barcelona, Spain
Medal record
Men's water polo
Representing Spain
Olympic Games
Gold medal – first place	1996 Atlanta	Team competition
Silver medal – second place	1992 Barcelona	Team competition
World Championships
Gold medal – first place	1998 Perth	Team competition
World Cup
Bronze medal – third place	1999 Sydney	Team competition
European Championships
Silver medal – second place	1991 Athens	Team competition
Bronze medal – third place	1993 Sheffield	Team competition

Jordi "Chiqui" Sans Juan (born August 3, 1965 in Barcelona, Catalonia) is a former water polo player from Spain, who was a member of the national team that won the gold medal at the 1996 Summer Olympics in Atlanta, United States. Four years earlier, when his home town of Barcelona hosted the Games, he was on the side that captured the silver medal.

Sans played in five consecutive Summer Olympics for his native country from 1984 to 2000. He is, jointly with Greek Georgios Mavrotas, the fifth athlete to compete in water polo at five Olympics, after Briton Paul Radmilovic, Hungarian Dezső Gyarmati, Italian Gianni De Magistris, and fellow Spaniard Manuel Estiarte. He is also, jointly with fencer Antonio García and shooter Jorge González, the seventh Spaniard to compete at five Olympics, after shooter Eladio Vallduvi, equestrian Luis Álvarez de Cervera, shooter Juan Seguí, water polo player Manuel Estiarte, hurdler Carlos Sala, and sailor José Luis Doreste.

== See also ==
- Spain men's Olympic water polo team records and statistics
- List of athletes with the most appearances at Olympic Games
- List of players who have appeared in multiple men's Olympic water polo tournaments
- List of Olympic champions in men's water polo
- List of Olympic medalists in water polo (men)
- List of men's Olympic water polo tournament top goalscorers
- List of world champions in men's water polo
- List of World Aquatics Championships medalists in water polo
