= Sergi Pedrerol =

Spanish water polo player (born 1969)

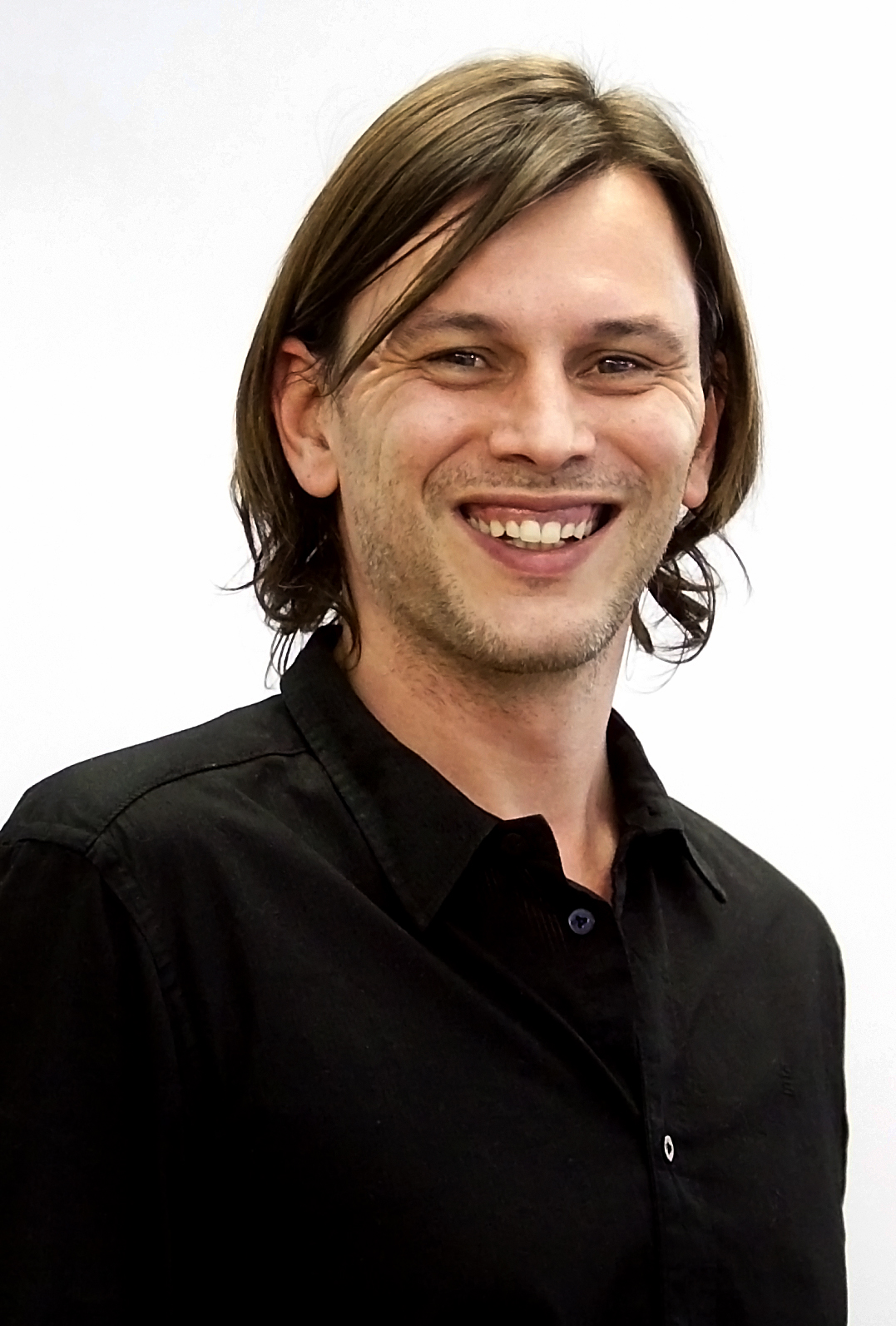

Personal information
- Full name: Sergi Pedrerol Cavallé
- Born: 16 December 1969 (age 56) Molins de Rei, Catalonia, Spain
Medal record
Men's water polo
Representing Spain
Olympic Games
Gold medal – first place	1996 Atlanta	Team competition
Silver medal – second place	1992 Barcelona	Team competition
World Championships
Gold medal – first place	1998 Perth	Team competition
Gold medal – first place	2001 Fukuoka	Team competition
FINA World Cup
Bronze medal – third place	1999 Sydney	Team competition

Sergi Pedrerol Cavallé (born 16 December 1969 in Molins de Rei, Catalonia) is a former water polo player from Spain, who was a member of the national team that won the golden medal at the 1996 Summer Olympics in Atlanta, Georgia.

Four years earlier, when Barcelona hosted the Summer Olympics, he was on the squad that captured the silver medal. Pedrerol competed in four Summer Olympics, starting in 1992. With the Spanish National Team he also won the world title twice, in Perth 1998 and Fukuoka 2001.

== See also ==
- Spain men's Olympic water polo team records and statistics
- List of Olympic champions in men's water polo
- List of Olympic medalists in water polo (men)
- List of players who have appeared in multiple men's Olympic water polo tournaments
- List of world champions in men's water polo
- List of World Aquatics Championships medalists in water polo
