= Daniel Ballart =

Spanish water polo player (born 1973)

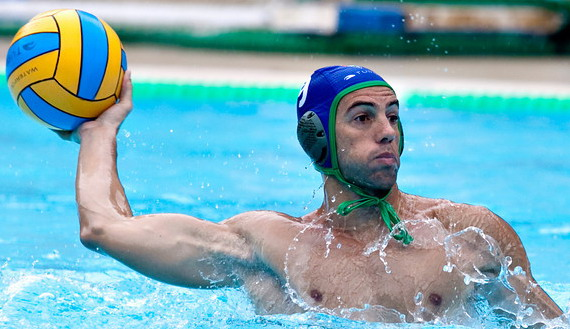

Personal information
- Born: 17 March 1973 (age 53) Barcelona, Catalonia, Spain

Sport
- Sport: Water polo
Medal record
Representing Spain
Olympic Games
Gold medal – first place	1996 Atlanta	Team competition
Silver medal – second place	1992 Barcelona	Team competition
World Championships
Gold medal – first place	1998 Perth	Team competition
Gold medal – first place	2001 Fukuoka	Team competition
FINA World Cup
Bronze medal – third place	1999 Sydney	Team competition
European Championships
Silver medal – second place	1991 Athens	Team competition
Bronze medal – third place	1993 Sheffield	Team competition

Daniel Ballart Sans (born 17 March 1973) is a water polo player from Spain. He was a member of the national team that won the gold medal at the 1996 Summer Olympics in Atlanta, Georgia. Four years earlier, when his home town of Barcelona hosted the Games, he was on the side that captured the silver medal. In total Ballart played in four consecutive Summer Olympics for his native country. In the 2019/2020 season he coached the Egyptian giants and champions Gezira Sporting Club in Egypt.

== See also ==
- Spain men's Olympic water polo team records and statistics
- List of Olympic champions in men's water polo
- List of Olympic medalists in water polo (men)
- List of players who have appeared in multiple men's Olympic water polo tournaments
- List of world champions in men's water polo
- List of World Aquatics Championships medalists in water polo
