= Iván Moro =

Spanish water polo player (born 1974)

Personal information
- Full name: Iván Moro Fernández
- Born: 25 December 1974 (age 51) Madrid, Spain
Medal record
Men's water polo
Representing Spain
Olympic Games
Gold medal – first place	1996 Atlanta	Team competition
World Championships
Gold medal – first place	1998 Perth	Team competition
Gold medal – first place	2001 Fukuoka	Team competition
FINA World Cup
Bronze medal – third place	1999 Sydney	Team competition

Iván Moro Fernández (born 25 December 1974 in Madrid) is a water polo player from Spain, who was a member of the national team that won the gold medal at the 1996 Summer Olympics in Atlanta, Georgia. He also competed for his native country in the Summer Games of 2000 and 2004.

He was the World Champion with Spain in 1998 in Perth, and in 2001 in Fukuoka.

He grew up in Alcorcón where he began playing water polo in the CN Ondarreta, with his elder brothers, Daniel Moro and Oscar Moro. He is the older brother of water polo player Daniel Moro. They competed together at the 2000 and 2004 Summer Olympics for the national team.

Daniel and Iván moved to Barcelona and played for several team. They also played for the Spanish National Water Polo team. Ivan won a European League in 1995 with Club Natacion Barcelona. He won five Spanish leagues, three Spanish King's cups and one Spanish Supercup.

The town hall of Alcorcón named a public swimming pool after Iván Moro. In 2006, Alcorcón's town hall appointed him as the General Manager of the local Foundation for the Sports in Alcorcón.

== See also ==
- Spain men's Olympic water polo team records and statistics
- List of Olympic champions in men's water polo
- List of Olympic medalists in water polo (men)
- List of world champions in men's water polo
- List of World Aquatics Championships medalists in water polo
