= Juan Jané =

Spanish water polo player (born 1953)

Personal information
- Nationality: Spanish
- Born: 31 May 1953 (age 73) Barcelona, Spain

Sport
- Sport: Water polo

Juan Jané (born 31 May 1953) is a Spanish water polo player. He competed at the 1968 Summer Olympics and the 1972 Summer Olympics.

== See also ==
- Spain men's Olympic water polo team records and statistics
- List of Olympic champions in men's water polo
- List of world champions in men's water polo
