= Gustavo Marcos =

Spanish water polo player (born 1972)

Personal information
- Full name: Gustavo Marcos Herrero
- Nationality: Spain
- Born: 23 December 1972 (age 53) Barcelona, Spain
- Height: 1.80 m (5 ft 11 in)
- Weight: 95 kg (209 lb)

Sport
- Sport: Water polo
- Position: centre back

Senior clubs
- Years: Team
- ?-?: CN Sabadell
National team
- Years: Team
- ?-?: Spain

Gustavo Marcos Herrero (born 23 December 1972) is a Spanish male water polo player in the late '90s and early '00s. He was a member of the Spain men's national water polo team, playing as a centre back. He was a part of the team at the 2000 Summer Olympics and 2004 Summer Olympics. On club level he played for CN Sabadell in Spain.

== See also ==
- List of world champions in men's water polo
- List of World Aquatics Championships medalists in water polo
