= Manuel Estiarte =

Spanish water polo player (born 1961)

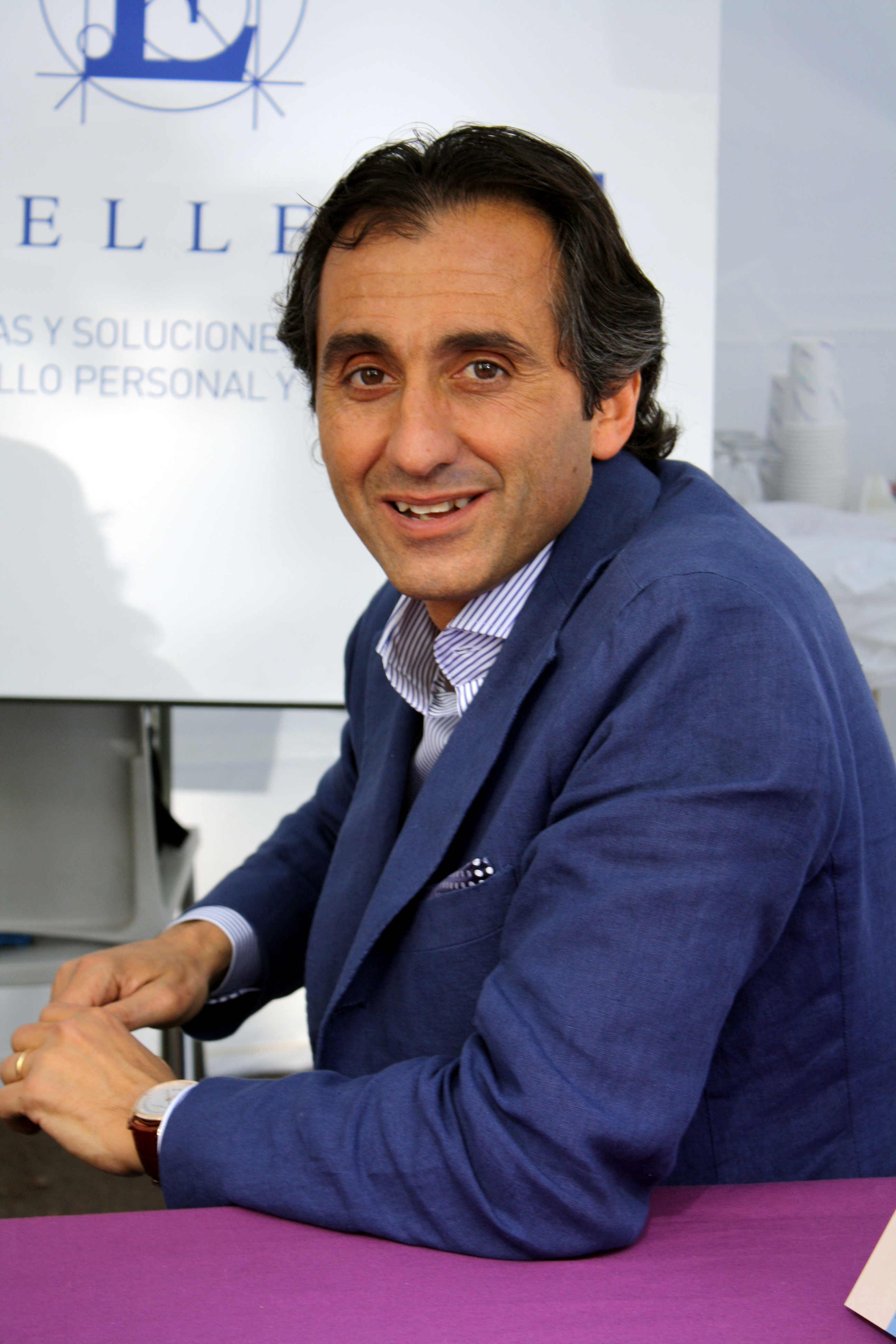
- Manuel Estiarte in 2009

Personal information
- Full name: Manel Estiarte Duocastella
- Nationality: Spain
- Born: 26 October 1961 (age 64) Manresa, Spain
- Height: 178 cm (5 ft 10 in)
- Weight: 62 kg (137 lb)

Sport
- Sport: Water polo
National team
- Years: Team
- 1977–2000: Spain
Medal record
Men's water polo
Representing Spain
Olympic Games
Gold medal – first place	1996 Atlanta	Team
Silver medal – second place	1992 Barcelona	Team
World Championship
Gold medal – first place	1998 Perth	Team
Silver medal – second place	1991 Perth	Team
Silver medal – second place	1994 Rome	Team
FINA World Cup
Bronze medal – third place	1985 Duisburg	Team
Bronze medal – third place	1991 Barcelona	Team
Bronze medal – third place	1999 Sydney	Team
European Championship
Silver medal – second place	1991 Athens	Team
Bronze medal – third place	1993 Sheffield	Team

Manel Estiarte Duocastella (born October 26, 1961, in Manresa) is a Spanish football coach and former water polo player. He is usually considered one of the two greatest water polo players of all time.

He has been a member of Pep Guardiola's technical staff at Barcelona, Bayern Munich and Manchester City.

== Water polo career ==
=== National team ===
Estiarte was born in Manresa, a municipality in Barcelona, Spain. He played for the national team for 23 years (between 1977 and 2000) and captained the side for 20 years. He made 580 appearances, and scored 1,561 goals.

His first international appearance was as a 15-year-old at the 1977 European Aquatics Championships in Jönköping, Sweden. At 18 years old, he made his Olympic debut at the 1980 Moscow Games, where he was the leading goalscorer - a feat he repeated at the 1984 Los Angeles Olympic Games, the 1988 Seoul Olympic Games and (jointly with Tibor Benedek) at the 1992 Barcelona Olympic Games, with 21, 34, 27 and 22 goals, respectively. Estiarte holds the record for the most goals scored by a water polo player in Olympic history, with 127 goals.

He has participated in six Olympic Games, all consecutively (Moscow 1980, Los Angeles 1984, Seoul 1988, Barcelona 1992, Atlanta 1996, and Sydney 2000). Estiarte is the second Spaniard to compete at six Olympic Games, after equestrian Luis Álvarez de Cervera. As of 2012, no other Spaniards have competed in six Olympics.

Estiarte is the first water polo player to compete at six Olympic Games. (While there is a case for Welshman Paul Radmilovic to be recognized as such, one of his appearances was the 1906 Intercalated Games, which are not considered 'official'.)

With the national squad, he reached the finals at the 1992 Barcelona Olympics on home soil. Estiarte converted a penalty 42 seconds from full-time to put Spain ahead, but nine seconds later Italy equalised and went on to win 9-8 in extra time.

Four years later, he was part of the team that made up for this painful loss by winning gold in the 1996 Atlanta Olympics, defeating Croatia 7-5 in the final.

He won the World Championship at Perth 1998 after finishing in second place at Perth 1991 and Rome 1994.

At the 2000 Olympics in Sydney, he was given the honour to carry the national flag of Spain during the opening ceremony, becoming the 19th water polo player to be a flag bearer at the opening and closing ceremonies of the Olympics. Later he announced his retirement from the sport.

During the 2000 Sydney Olympics, Estiarte was chosen by his fellow athletes in the Olympic Village to represent them in the Commission of Active Athletes. He was also a member of the International Olympic Committee from 2000 to 2006. From July 2008 until June 2012, he was involved in external relations at Barcelona.

=== Clubs ===
- Club Natació Manresa (1975 – 1979) (Spain)
- Club Natació Barcelona (1979 – 1985) (Spain)
- Pallanuoto Pescara (1986 – 1989 / 1992 - 1999) (Italy)
- Rari Nantes Savona ( 1989 – 1991) (Italy)
- Club Natació Catalunya (1991 – 1992) (Spain)
- Club Natació Atlètic-Barceloneta (1999 – 2000) (Spain)

== Football career ==
Estiarte and Pep Guardiola, former manager of Manchester City, have known each other since the early 1990s. The pair met on the final day of the 1991-1992 La Liga season, when Guardiola, still a Barcelona player at the time, won the title, and Estiarte, a passionate Barcelona supporter, went to congratulate him. The pair remained in contact throughout both of their careers as athletes, and in 2008, Guardiola asked Estiarte if he could accompany him to Barcelona to assist him as head coach.

He was also Pep Guardiola's personal assistant at Bayern Munich from 2013 to 2016, and at Manchester City from 2016 to 2026. Estiarte's official title at the Premier League club was head of player support and protocol.

The two have been close friends and colleagues since, with Estiarte working with Guardiola for the entirety of his career in management, even assisting Guardiola in obtaining a lawyer when he was accused of doping in 2001.

Guardiola wrote the foreword to Estiarte's autobiography, saying about the six-time Olympian: “I don't know if angels exist and, if they do, if they help us. Much less if guardian angels exist. But, if they do exist, I believe you are one of them.” In reference to Estiarte's influence on him as a manager, Guardiola has stated that “he helped me a lot in terms of the significance of understanding sport by seeing it from above.” Guardiola maintains that Estiarte is a crucial element to his managerial endeavors.

== Personal life ==
Estiarte was one of three born to parents in Manresa, Spain, with a brother named Albert and a sister named Rosa. All three siblings were involved in high-profile athletics. Rosa Estiarte committed suicide in 1985 by jumping out of a window in their fourth-floor family home, which Manel witnessed. Manel is married and has two children, including a daughter named Rebecca.

In 2009, Estiarte released his autobiography, entitled Todos Mis Hermanos (All My Siblings), in which he recounts his personal and professional life, including the death of his sister Rosa.

== Honors ==
=== National team ===
==== Olympic Games ====
- Gold (1): Atlanta 1996
- Silver (1): Barcelona 1992
- Fourth Place (3): Moscow 1980, Los Angeles 1984, Sydney 2000

==== World Championships ====
- Gold (1): Perth 1998.
- Silver (2): Perth 1991, Rome 1994.

==== Water Polo World Cup ====
- Bronze (3): Duisburg 1985, Barcelona 1991, Sydney 1999.

==== European Championships ====
- Silver (1): Athens 1991
- Bronze (1): Sheffield 1993.

=== Clubs ===
- 2 European Cups: with C.N. Barcelona and Pescara.
- 3 European Cup Winners’ Cups: one with C.N. Barcelona and 2 with Pescara.
- 9 Leagues: 5 in Spain with C.N. Barcelona and 4 in Italy with Pescara.
- 11 Domestic Cups: 5 in Spain with C.N. Barcelona and 6 in Italy with Pescara.
- 4 European Supercups: 2 with C.N. Barcelona and 2 with Pescara.

=== Individual Distinctions ===
- Gold Insignia by C.N. Manresa in 1982.
- Title of "The Maradona of Water Polo" by Pescara in 1985.
- Best Water Polo Player in 1986, 1987, 1988, 1989, 1990, 1991, and 1992.
- Extraordinary Distinction of the Royal Spanish Swimming Federation in 1992.
- Gold Medal of the Royal Order of Sports Merit in 1993.
- Extraordinary Medal of Brilliance of the Royal Spanish Swimming Federation in 1996.
- Marca Leyenda (Marca Legend) Award in 1998.
- Prince of Asturias Sports Award in 2001.

== Decorations ==
Manel Estiarte was awarded with the Gold Medal of the Royal Order of Sports Merit in 1993, and the Grand Cross of the Royal Order of Sports Merit in 1996, the highest distinction of sporting merit in Spain. Additionally, he was granted the most prestigious domestic/international sports award in Spain, the Prince of Asturias Sports Award in 2001.

== Bibliography ==
- Estiarte, Manel (2009). Todos Mis Hermanos (All My Siblings). Plataforma Editorial. ISBN 978-84-96981-37-9.

== Filmography ==
- TV3 Documentary (18/07/2012), «Sense ficció: "Aigua, infern, cel"» on YouTube
- TVE Documentary (29/10/2012), «Legendarios - Manuel Estiarte» on RTVE.es
- Movistar+ Documentary (25/05/2016), «Informe Robinson - Manel Estiarte» on YouTube

== See also ==
- Spain men's Olympic water polo team records and statistics
- List of athletes with the most appearances at Olympic Games
- List of players who have appeared in multiple men's Olympic water polo tournaments
- List of Olympic champions in men's water polo
- List of Olympic medalists in water polo (men)
- List of men's Olympic water polo tournament top goalscorers
- List of flag bearers for Spain at the Olympics
- List of world champions in men's water polo
- List of World Aquatics Championships medalists in water polo
- List of members of the International Swimming Hall of Fame

Olympic Games
Preceded by Luis Doreste	Flagbearer for Spain; Sidney 2000	Succeeded by Isabel Fernández
Awards
Preceded by (United States) Lance Armstrong	Prince of Asturias Award for Sports; 2001	Succeeded by Brazil national football team
