= List of men's Olympic water polo tournament records and statistics =

This is a list of records and statistics of the men's Olympic water polo tournament since the inaugural official edition in 1900.

== Abbreviations ==
Rk	Rank	Ref	Reference	(C)	Captain
Pos	Playing position	FP	Field player	GK	Goalkeeper
L/R	Handedness	L	Left-handed	R	Right-handed
p.	page	pp.	pages		

== General statistics ==
This is a summary of men's water polo at the Summer Olympics by tournament.

The following table shows winning teams, coaches and captains by tournament. Last updated: 8 August 2021.

Legend

- Team – Olympic winning streak (winning three or more Olympic titles in a row)
- Team – Winning all matches during the tournament
- Team – Host team
- Team^{†} – Defunct team

Winning teams, coaches and captains by tournament
#	Men's tournament	Winning team	Winning coach	Winning captain
1	Paris 1900	Great Britain (1st title)	—N/a	(United Kingdom) Thomas Coe
2	St. Louis 1904	Water polo was an unofficial sport		
3	London 1908	Great Britain (2nd title)	—N/a	(United Kingdom) Charles Smith
4	Stockholm 1912	Great Britain (3rd title)	—N/a	(United Kingdom) George Wilkinson
5	Antwerp 1920	Great Britain (4th title)	—N/a	(United Kingdom) Paul Radmilovic
6	Paris 1924	France (1st title)	—N/a	(France) Georges Rigal
7	Amsterdam 1928	Germany (1st title)	(Germany) Dr. Moritz Nußbaum	—N/a
8	Los Angeles 1932	Hungary (1st title)	(Hungary) Bela Komjadi	—N/a
9	Berlin 1936	Hungary (2nd title)	—N/a	—N/a
10	London 1948	Italy (1st title)	(Italy) Giuseppe Valle	—N/a
11	Helsinki 1952	Hungary (3rd title)	(Hungary) Béla Rajki	—N/a
12	Melbourne 1956	Hungary (4th title)	(Hungary) Béla Rajki (2)	(Hungary) Dezső Gyarmati
13	Rome 1960	Italy (2nd title)	(Hungary) Andres Zolyomy	—N/a
14	Tokyo 1964	Hungary (5th title)	(Hungary) Károly Laky	(Hungary) Dezső Gyarmati (2)
15	Mexico City 1968	Yugoslavia^{†} (1st title)	(Socialist Federal Republic of Yugoslavia) Aleksandar Sajfert	—N/a
16	Munich 1972	Soviet Union^{†} (1st title)	(Soviet Union) Vladimir Semyonov	—N/a
17	Montreal 1976	Hungary (6th title)	(Hungary) Dezső Gyarmati	—N/a
18	Moscow 1980	Soviet Union^{†} (2nd title)	(Soviet Union) Boris Popov	—N/a
19	Los Angeles 1984	Yugoslavia^{†} (2nd title)	(Socialist Federal Republic of Yugoslavia) Ratko Rudić	—N/a
20	Seoul 1988	Yugoslavia^{†} (3rd title)	(Socialist Federal Republic of Yugoslavia) Ratko Rudić (2)	—N/a
21	Barcelona 1992	Italy (3rd title)	(Croatia) Ratko Rudić (3)	—N/a
22	Atlanta 1996	Spain (1st title)	(Spain) Juan Jané	(Spain) Manuel Estiarte
23	Sydney 2000	Hungary (7th title)	(Hungary) Dénes Kemény	—N/a
24	Athens 2004	Hungary (8th title)	(Hungary) Dénes Kemény (2)	(Hungary) Tibor Benedek
25	Beijing 2008	Hungary (9th title)	(Hungary) Dénes Kemény (3)	(Hungary) Tibor Benedek (2)
26	London 2012	Croatia (1st title)	(Croatia) Ratko Rudić (4)	(Croatia) Samir Barać
27	Rio 2016	Serbia (1st title)	(Serbia) Dejan Savić	(Serbia) Živko Gocić
28	Tokyo 2020	Serbia (2nd title)	(Serbia) Dejan Savić (2)	(Serbia) Filip Filipović
29	Paris 2024	Serbia (3rd title)	(Serbia) Uroš Stevanović	(Serbia) Nikola Jakšić
#	Men's tournament	Winning team	Winning coach	Winning captain

The following table shows top goalscorers, goalkeepers, sprinters and Most Valuable Players by tournament. Last updated: 8 August 2021.

Notes:

- Top goalscorer: the water polo player who scored the most goals in a tournament.
- Top goalkeeper: the water polo player who saved the most shots in a tournament.
- Top sprinter: the water polo player who won the most sprints in a tournament.
- Most Valuable Player: the water polo player who was named the Most Valuable Player of a tournament.

Legend and abbreviation

- Team – Olympic winning streak
- Team – Winning all matches during the tournament
- Team – Host team
- Team^{†} – Defunct team
- Player^{‡} – Player who won the tournament with his team
- Eff % – Save efficiency (Saves / Shots)

Top goalscorers, goalkeepers, sprinters and Most Valuable Players by tournament
Year	Winning team	Top goalscorer (Goals)	Top goalkeeper (Saves, Eff %)	Top sprinter (Sprints won)	Most Valuable Player (Goals or Saves, Eff %)
1900	Great Britain	(United Kingdom) John Jarvis^{‡} (6)	—N/a	—N/a	—N/a
1904	Water polo was an unofficial sport				
1908	Great Britain	(Belgium) Fernand Feyaerts (8)	—N/a	—N/a	—N/a
1912	Great Britain	(Sweden) Robert Andersson (9)	—N/a	—N/a	—N/a
1920	Great Britain	(Sweden) Erik Andersson (10)	—N/a	—N/a	—N/a
1924	France	(Belgium) Pierre Dewin (14)	—N/a	—N/a	—N/a
1928	Germany	(Hungary) Ferenc Keserű (10)	—N/a	—N/a	—N/a
1932	Hungary	(United States) Philip Daubenspeck (14)	—N/a	—N/a	—N/a
1936	Hungary	(Germany) Hans Schneider (22)	—N/a	—N/a	—N/a
1948	Italy	(Italy) Aldo Ghira^{‡} (18) (Note: At the 1948 Olympics, the water polo match between Italy and Yugoslavia in Group D, and the match between Egypt and Hungary in Group E were both replayed. For more details, please see here.)	—N/a	—N/a	—N/a
1952	Hungary	(Hungary) István Szívós Sr.^{‡} (16) (Netherlands) Ruud van Feggelen (16) (Note: At the 1952 Olympics, the water polo match between the Netherlands and Yugoslavia in Group C was replayed. For more details, please see here.)	—N/a	—N/a	—N/a
1956	Hungary	(Soviet Union) Petre Mshvenieradze (11)	—N/a	—N/a	—N/a
1960	Italy	(United States) Fred Tisue (12) (Romania) Aurel Zahan (12)	—N/a	—N/a	—N/a
1964	Hungary	(Netherlands) Nico van der Voet (10)	—N/a	—N/a	—N/a
1968	Yugoslavia^{†}	(Netherlands) Nico van der Voet (33)	—N/a	—N/a	—N/a
1972	Soviet Union^{†}	(Cuba) Carlos Sánchez (18)	—N/a	—N/a	—N/a
1976	Hungary	(Hungary) Tamás Faragó^{‡} (22)	—N/a	—N/a	—N/a
1980	Soviet Union^{†}	(Spain) Manuel Estiarte (21)	—N/a	—N/a	—N/a
1984	Yugoslavia^{†}	(Spain) Manuel Estiarte (34)	—N/a	—N/a	—N/a
1988	Yugoslavia^{†}	(Spain) Manuel Estiarte (27)	—N/a	—N/a	—N/a
1992	Italy	(Hungary) Tibor Benedek (22) (Spain) Manuel Estiarte (22)	—N/a	—N/a	—N/a
1996	Spain	(Hungary) Tibor Benedek (19)	(Netherlands) Arie van de Bunt (81, 52.6%)	—N/a	—N/a
2000	Hungary	(Federal Republic of Yugoslavia) Aleksandar Šapić (18)	(United States) Dan Hackett (70, 51.9%)	(United States) Brad Schumacher (20)	—N/a
2004	Hungary	(Serbia and Montenegro) Aleksandar Šapić (18)	(Russia) Nikolay Maksimov (62, 59.6%)	(Australia) Pietro Figlioli (24)	(Hungary) Gergely Kiss^{‡} (14 goals)
2008	Hungary	(Italy) Alessandro Calcaterra (27)	(Italy) Stefano Tempesti (83, 49.1%)	(Australia) Pietro Figlioli (21)	—N/a
2012	Croatia	(Serbia) Andrija Prlainović (22)	(Italy) Stefano Tempesti (87, 59.2%)	(Italy) Pietro Figlioli (19) (Australia) Rhys Howden (19)	(Croatia) Josip Pavić^{‡} (85 saves, 70.2%)
2016	Serbia	(Serbia) Filip Filipović^{‡} (19) (Spain) Guillermo Molina (19)	(Brazil) Slobodan Soro (81, 53.3%)	(Australia) Rhys Howden (18)	(Serbia) Filip Filipović^{‡} (19 goals)
2020	Serbia	(Montenegro) Aleksandar Ivović (23)	(Serbia) Branislav Mitrović (70, 57.4%) (Greece) Emmanouil Zerdevas (70, 57.4%)	(United States) Johnny Hooper (22)	(Serbia) Filip Filipović^{‡} (16 goals)
2020	Serbia	(Serbia) Dušan Mandić^{‡} (26)	(United States) Adrian Weinberg (94, 56%)	(Spain) Martin Famera (22)	(Serbia) Dušan Mandić^{‡} (26)
Year	Winning team	Top goalscorer (Goals)	Top goalkeeper (Saves, Eff %)	Top sprinter (Sprints won)	Most Valuable Player (Goals or Saves, Eff %)

== Confederation statistics ==
=== Best performances by tournament ===
This is a summary of the best performances of each confederation in each tournament. Last updated: 8 August 2021.

Note: italic number in header means unofficial tournament was held.

Legend

- 1st – Champions
- 2nd – Runners-up
- 3rd – Third place
- 4th – Fourth place
- Q – Qualified for forthcoming tournament

Confederation	00	04	08	12	20	24	28	32	36	48	52	56	60	64	68	72	76	80	84	88	92	96	00	04	08	12	16	20	24
Africa – CANA	—		—	—	—	—	—	—	—	7th	10th	—	9th	12th	15th	—	—	—	—	—	—	—	—	12th	—	—	—	12th	—
Americas – UANA	—		—	—	4th	3rd	7th	3rd	9th	10th	4th	5th	7th	9th	5th	3rd	7th	5th	2nd	2nd	4th	7th	6th	7th	2nd	8th	10th	6th	3rd
Asia – AASF	—		—	—	—	—	—	4th	14th	12th	21st	10th	14th	11th	12th	15th	12th	—	9th	11th	—	—	9th	11th	12th	11th	12th	10th	11th
Europe – LEN	1st		1st	1st	1st	1st	1st	1st	1st	1st	1st	1st	1st	1st	1st	1st	1st	1st	1st	1st	1st	1st	1st	1st	1st	1st	1st	1st	1st
Oceania – OSA	—		—	—	—	—	—	—	—	18th	19th	9th	15th	10th	—	12th	11th	7th	5th	8th	5th	—	8th	9th	8th	7th	9th	9th	8th
Total teams	7		4	6	12	13	14	5	16	18	21	10	16	13	15	16	12	12	12	12	12	12	12	12	12	12	12	12	12

=== All-time best performances ===
This is a summary of the best performances of each confederation at the Olympics. Last updated: 8 August 2021.

Legend

- Year^{*} – As host team
- Team^{†} – Defunct team

Confederation	Best performance	Men's team
Africa – CANA	7th	Egypt (1948)
Americas – UANA	2nd	United States (1984^{*}, 1988, 2008)
Asia – AASF	4th	Japan (1932)
Europe – LEN	1st	Croatia (2012), France (1924^{*}), Germany (1928), Great Britain (1900, 1908^{*}, 1912, 1920), Hungary (1932, 1936, 1952, 1956, 1964, 1976, 2000, 2004, 2008), Italy (1948, 1960^{*}, 1992), Serbia (2016, 2020), Soviet Union^{†} (1972, 1980^{*}), Spain (1996), Yugoslavia^{†} (1968, 1984, 1988)
Oceania – OSA	5th	Australia (1984, 1992)

== Team statistics ==
=== Comprehensive team results by tournament ===
Note: Results of Olympic qualification tournaments are not included. Numbers refer to the final placing of each team at the respective Games; italic number in header means unofficial tournament was held. Last updated: 11 February 2024.

Legend

- 1 – Champions
- 2 – Runners-up
- 3 – Third place
- 4 – Fourth place
- – Qualified but were not allowed to compete
- – Disqualified
- — – The nation did not participate in the Games
- Q – Qualified for forthcoming tournament
- – Hosts
- = – More than one team tied for that rank
- Team^{†} – Defunct team

Abbreviation

- stats – Olympic water polo team statistics
- EUA – United Team of Germany
- FRG – West Germany
- FRY – FR Yugoslavia
- GDR – East Germany
- SCG – Serbia and Montenegro

Africa – CANA (2 teams)
Men's team	00	04	08	12	20	24	28	32	36	48	52	56	60	64	68	72	76	80	84	88	92	96	00	04	08	12	16	20	24	Years
Egypt (stats)	—	—	—					—		7	10	—	13	12	15			—						12						6
South Africa	—										14		9	—	—	—	—	—	—	—								12	WD	3

Americas – UANA (8 teams)
Men's team	00	04	08	12	20	24	28	32	36	48	52	56	60	64	68	72	76	80	84	88	92	96	00	04	08	12	16	20	24	Years
Argentina		—		—			13			10	16		11					—												4
Brazil (stats)	—	—	—	—	6		—	(Note: At the 1932 Olympics, Brazil was disqualified after their players attacked the Hungarian referee at the end of their match against Germany. Their two matches were annulled. Therefore, Hungary and Japan won their games scheduled with Brazil, by forfeit. For more details, please see the Official Report of the 1932 Olympic Games (pp. 650–651), and here.)			9		12	13	13				12								8			8
Canada (stats)																16	9	—	10						11					4
Chile	—	—	—					—		17								—												1
Cuba			—	—	—										8	9	7	5	—	—	8									5
Mexico		—	—	—	—						18				11	13	10													4
United States (stats)					4	3	7	3	9	11	4	5	7	9	5	3		—	2	2	4	7	6	7	2	8	10	6	3	23
Uruguay	—	—	—	—	—				13	16								—												2

Asia – AASF (7 teams)
Men's team	00	04	08	12	20	24	28	32	36	48	52	56	60	64	68	72	76	80	84	88	92	96	00	04	08	12	16	20	24	Years
China	—	—	—	—	—	—	—	—	—	—		—	—	—	—	—	—	—	9	11					12					3
India		—	—	—						12	21																			2
Iran		—	—	—	—	—	—	—	—								12	—	—											1
Japan (stats)	—	—	—					4	14	—			14	11	12	15		—	11								12	10	11	10
Kazakhstan (stats)	—	—	—	—	—	Part of Soviet Union															(Note: In 1992, 12 of the 15 former Soviet Republics competed together as the Unified Team and marched under the Olympic Flag in the Barcelona Games.)		9	11		11		11		4
Singapore	—	—	—	—	—	—	—	—	—			10		—				—												1
South Korea	—	—	—	—	—	—	—	—	—									—		12										1

Europe – LEN (34 teams)
Men's team	00	04	08	12	20	24	28	32	36	48	52	56	60	64	68	72	76	80	84	88	92	96	00	04	08	12	16	20	24	Years
Austria				4	—				7		13																			3
Belgium (stats)	2	—	2	3	2	2	6		3	4	6		16	7																11
Bulgaria	—	—	—	—	—			—		—						11		12	—											2
Croatia (stats)	—	—	—	—	Part of Yugoslavia																	2	7	10	6	1	2	5	2	8
Czechoslovakia^{†}	—	—	—	—	12	6	10		11										—		12	Defunct								5
East Germany^{†}	Part of Germany											P. of EUA			6				—		Part of Germany									1
France (stats)	3 (Note: France had four teams compete in 1900. Bronze medals were given to the losers of both semifinals; France took both bronze medals. Although Bill Burgess, a member of one of the French bronze medalist teams, was a British national, the IOC attributed the bronze medal to France based on the team's club affiliation.)	—		6	9	1	3		4	6			10							10	11						11		10	12
Germany (stats)	=5				—	—	1	2	2	—	15	See EUA			See FRG and GDR						7	9		5	10					9
Great Britain (stats)	1		1	1	1	8	4		8	13	12	7														12				11
Greece (stats)					8	13				15					14	14		10	8	9	10	6	10	4	7	9	6	2	5	17
Hungary (stats)				5	—	5	2	1	1	2	1	1	3	1	3	2	1	3	—	5	6	4	1	1	1	5	5	3	4	24
Iceland	—	—	—		—	—	—	—	15																					1
Ireland	—	—	—	—	—	9	14		—																					2
Italy (stats)		—			10	11				1	3	4	1	4	4	6	2	8	7	7	1	3	5	8	9	2	3	7	7	22
Luxembourg	—	—	—				11	—																						1
Malta	—	—	—	—	—	—	8	—	16		—	—		—			—													2
Montenegro (stats)	—	—	—	—	Part of Yugoslavia																P. of FRY / SCG				4	4	4	8	9	5
Netherlands (stats)		—	4		5	7	5		5	3	5		8	8	7	7	3	6	6		9	10	11							17
Portugal	—	—	—								20																			1
Romania (stats)		—	—	—	—			—		—	17	8	5	5		8	4	9				11				10			12	10
Russia (stats)	—	—	—	—	—	Part of Soviet Union																5	2	3						3
Serbia (stats)	—	—	—		Part of Yugoslavia																P. of FRY / SCG				3	3	1	1	1	5
Serbia and Montenegro^{†} (stats)	—	—	—	—	Part of Yugoslavia																See FRY			2	Defunct					1
Slovakia	—	—	—	—	Part of Czechoslovakia																		12							1
Soviet Union^{†} (Note: The Olympic Committee of the Soviet Union was formed on 21 April 1951, and was recognised by the International Olympic Committee on 7 May 1951.) (stats)	—	—	—	—	—	—	—	—	—	—	7	3	2	3	2	1	8	1	—	3	Defunct									9
Spain (stats)		—	—	—	7	10	9		—	8	8	—			9	10		4	4	6	2	1	4	6	5	6	7	4	6	19
Sweden (stats)		—	3	2	3	4			6	5	11							11												8
Switzerland					11	12	12		12	14		—																		5
Ukraine	—	—	—	—	—	—	—	—	—	—	Part of Soviet Union											12								1
(International Olympic Committee) Unified Team^{†} (stats)	—	—	—	—	—	Part of Soviet Union															3	Defunct								1
United Team of Germany^{†} (stats)	See Germany											6	6	6	See FRG and GDR						See Germany									3
West Germany^{†} (stats)	Part of Germany											P. of EUA			10	4	6	—	3	4	Part of Germany									5
Yugoslavia^{†} (stats)	—	—	—	—					10	9	2	2	4	2	1	5	5	2	1	1	Defunct									12
Yugoslavia^{†} (Note: After the breakup of Yugoslavia, FR Yugoslavia men's national water polo team participated at the 1996 and 2000 Olympics, and won a bronze medal in 2000. In 2003, after the country was renamed from FR Yugoslavia to Serbia and Montenegro, the team was also renamed to "Serbia and Montenegro men's national water polo team". Despite the renaming of the country name, both team of FR Yugoslavia and team of Serbia and Montenegro represented the same national entity: a joint state of Montenegro and Serbia.) (stats)	—	—	—	—	Part of Yugoslavia																—	8	3	Defunct						2

Oceania – OSA (1 team)
Men's team	00	04	08	12	20	24	28	32	36	48	52	56	60	64	68	72	76	80	84	88	92	96	00	04	08	12	16	20	24	Years
Australia (stats)			—	—						18	19	9	15	10	(Note: While Australia had qualified to compete as one of sixteen water polo teams, the Australian Olympic Committee (AOC) did not endorse them. The Australian players responded by paying their own way to travel to Mexico City, but the team were not allowed to compete. For more details, please see here (1, 2).)	12	11	7	5	8	5		8	9	8	7	9	9	8	18

Men's team	00	04	08	12	20	24	28	32	36	48	52	56	60	64	68	72	76	80	84	88	92	96	00	04	08	12	16	20	24	Years
Total teams	7		4	6	12	13	14	5	16	18	21	10	16	13	15	16	12	12	12	12	12	12	12	12	12	12	12	12	12	

=== Number of appearances by team ===
The following table is pre-sorted by number of appearances (in descending order), year of the last appearance (in ascending order), year of the first appearance (in ascending order), name of the team (in ascending order), respectively. Last updated: 8 August 2021.

Legend and abbreviation

- Year^{*} – As host team
- Team^{†} – Defunct team
- Apps – Appearances
- stats – Olympic water polo team statistics

Number of appearances by team
Rk	Men's team	Apps	Record streak	Active streak	Debut	Most recent	Best finish	Confederation
1	Hungary (stats)	23	13	9	1912	2020	Champions	Europe – LEN
2	United States (stats)	22	12	10	1920	2020	Runners-up	Americas – UANA
3	Italy (stats)	21	19	19	1920	2020	Champions	Europe – LEN
4	Spain (stats)	18	11	11	1920	2020	Champions	Europe – LEN
5	Netherlands (stats)	17	7	0	1908	2000	Third place	Europe – LEN
5	Australia (stats)	17	6	6	1948	2020	Fifth place	Oceania – OSA
7	Greece (stats)	16	11	11	1920	2020	Runners-up	Europe – LEN
8	Yugoslavia^{†} (stats)	12	12	0	1936	1988	Champions	Europe – LEN
9	Belgium (stats)	11	5	0	1900	1964	Runners-up	Europe – LEN
9	Great Britain (stats)	11	5	0	1900	2012^{*}	Champions	Europe – LEN
9	France (stats)	11	4	0	1900^{*}	2016	Champions	Europe – LEN
12	Soviet Union^{†} (stats)	9	8	0	1952	1988	Champions	Europe – LEN
12	Germany (stats)	9	3	0	1900	2008	Champions	Europe – LEN
12	Romania (stats)	9	4	0	1952	2012	Fourth place	Europe – LEN
12	Japan (stats)	9	4	2	1932	2020^{*}	Fourth place	Asia – AASF
16	Sweden (stats)	8	4	0	1908	1980	Runners-up	Europe – LEN
16	Brazil (stats)	8	3	0	1920	2016^{*}	Sixth place	Americas – UANA
18	Croatia (stats)	7	7	7	1996	2020	Champions	Europe – LEN
19	Egypt (stats)	6	3	0	1948	2004	Seventh place	Africa – CANA
20	Switzerland	5	3	0	1920	1948	Eleventh place	Europe – LEN
20	West Germany^{†} (stats)	5	3	0	1968	1988	Third place	Europe – LEN
20	Czechoslovakia^{†}	5	3	0	1920	1992	Sixth place	Europe – LEN
20	Cuba	5	4	0	1968	1992	Fifth place	Americas – UANA
24	Argentina	4	2	0	1928	1960	Tenth place	Americas – UANA
24	Mexico	4	3	0	1952	1976	Tenth place	Americas – UANA
24	Canada (stats)	4	2	0	1972	2008	Ninth place	Americas – UANA
24	Kazakhstan (stats)	4	2	1	2000	2020	Ninth place	Asia – AASF
24	Montenegro (stats)	4	4	4	2008	2020	Fourth place	Europe – LEN
24	Serbia (stats)	4	4	4	2008	2020	Champions	Europe – LEN
30	Austria	3	1	0	1912	1952	Fourth place	Europe – LEN
30	United Team of Germany^{†} (stats)	3	3	0	1956	1964	Sixth place	Europe – LEN
30	Russia (stats)	3	3	0	1996	2004	Runners-up	Europe – LEN
30	China	3	2	0	1984	2008^{*}	Ninth place	Asia – AASF
30	South Africa	3	1	1	1952	2020	Ninth place	Africa – CANA
35	Ireland	2	2	0	1924	1928	Ninth place	Europe – LEN
35	Malta	2	1	0	1928	1936	Eighth place	Europe – LEN
35	Uruguay	2	2	0	1936	1948	Thirteenth place	Americas – UANA
35	India	2	2	0	1948	1952	Twelfth place	Asia – AASF
35	Bulgaria	2	1	0	1972	1980	Eleventh place	Europe – LEN
35	Yugoslavia^{†} (stats)	2	2	0	1996	2000	Third place	Europe – LEN
41	Luxembourg	1	1	0	1928	1928	Eleventh place	Europe – LEN
41	Iceland	1	1	0	1936	1936	Fifteenth place	Europe – LEN
41	Chile	1	1	0	1948	1948	Seventeenth place	Americas – UANA
41	Portugal	1	1	0	1952	1952	Twentieth place	Europe – LEN
41	Singapore	1	1	0	1956	1956	Tenth place	Asia – AASF
41	East Germany^{†}	1	1	0	1968	1968	Sixth place	Europe – LEN
41	Iran	1	1	0	1976	1976	Twelfth place	Asia – AASF
41	South Korea	1	1	0	1988^{*}	1988^{*}	Twelfth place	Asia – AASF
41	(International Olympic Committee) Unified Team^{†} (stats)	1	1	0	1992	1992	Third place	Europe – LEN
41	Ukraine	1	1	0	1996	1996	Twelfth place	Europe – LEN
41	Slovakia	1	1	0	2000	2000	Twelfth place	Europe – LEN
41	Serbia and Montenegro^{†} (stats)	1	1	0	2004	2004	Runners-up	Europe – LEN
Rk	Men's team	Apps	Record streak	Active streak	Debut	Most recent	Best finish	Confederation

=== Best finishes by team ===
The following table is pre-sorted by best finish (in descending order), name of the team (in ascending order), respectively. Last updated: 8 August 2021.

Legend and abbreviation

- Year^{*} – As host team
- Team^{†} – Defunct team
- Apps – Appearances
- stats – Olympic water polo team statistics

Best finishes by team
Rk	Men's team	Best finish	Apps	Confederation
1	Hungary (stats)	Champions (1932, 1936, 1952, 1956, 1964, 1976, 2000, 2004, 2008)	23	Europe – LEN
2	Great Britain (stats)	Champions (1900, 1908^{*}, 1912, 1920)	11	Europe – LEN
3	Italy (stats)	Champions (1948, 1960^{*}, 1992)	21	Europe – LEN
3	Yugoslavia^{†} (stats)	Champions (1968, 1984, 1988)	12	Europe – LEN
5	Serbia (stats)	Champions (2016, 2020)	4	Europe – LEN
5	Soviet Union^{†} (stats)	Champions (1972, 1980^{*})	9	Europe – LEN
7	Croatia (stats)	Champions (2012)	7	Europe – LEN
7	France (stats)	Champions (1924^{*})	11	Europe – LEN
7	Germany (stats)	Champions (1928)	9	Europe – LEN
7	Spain (stats)	Champions (1996)	18	Europe – LEN
11	Belgium (stats)	Runners-up (1900, 1908, 1920^{*}, 1924)	11	Europe – LEN
12	United States (stats)	Runners-up (1984^{*}, 1988, 2008)	22	Americas – UANA
13	Greece (stats)	Runners-up (2020)	16	Europe – LEN
13	Russia (stats)	Runners-up (2000)	3	Europe – LEN
13	Serbia and Montenegro^{†} (stats)	Runners-up (2004)	1	Europe – LEN
13	Sweden (stats)	Runners-up (1912^{*})	8	Europe – LEN
17	Netherlands (stats)	Third place (1948, 1976)	17	Europe – LEN
18	(International Olympic Committee) Unified Team^{†} (stats)	Third place (1992)	1	Europe – LEN
18	West Germany^{†} (stats)	Third place (1984)	5	Europe – LEN
18	Yugoslavia^{†} (stats)	Third place (2000)	2	Europe – LEN
21	Montenegro (stats)	Fourth place (2008, 2012, 2016)	4	Europe – LEN
22	Austria	Fourth place (1912)	3	Europe – LEN
22	Japan (stats)	Fourth place (1932)	9	Asia – AASF
22	Romania (stats)	Fourth place (1976)	9	Europe – LEN
25	Australia (stats)	Fifth place (1984, 1992)	17	Oceania – OSA
26	Cuba	Fifth place (1980)	5	Americas – UANA
27	United Team of Germany^{†} (stats)	Sixth place (1956, 1960, 1964)	3	Europe – LEN
28	Brazil (stats)	Sixth place (1920)	8	Americas – UANA
28	Czechoslovakia^{†}	Sixth place (1924)	5	Europe – LEN
28	East Germany^{†}	Sixth place (1968)	1	Europe – LEN
31	Egypt (stats)	Seventh place (1948)	6	Africa – CANA
32	Malta	Eighth place (1928)	2	Europe – LEN
33	Canada (stats)	Ninth place (1976^{*})	4	Americas – UANA
33	China	Ninth place (1984)	3	Asia – AASF
33	Ireland	Ninth place (1924)	2	Europe – LEN
33	Kazakhstan (stats)	Ninth place (2000)	4	Asia – AASF
33	South Africa	Ninth place (1960)	3	Africa – CANA
38	Argentina	Tenth place (1948)	4	Americas – UANA
38	Mexico	Tenth place (1976)	4	Americas – UANA
38	Singapore	Tenth place (1956)	1	Asia – AASF
41	Bulgaria	Eleventh place (1972)	2	Europe – LEN
41	Luxembourg	Eleventh place (1928)	1	Europe – LEN
41	Switzerland	Eleventh place (1920)	5	Europe – LEN
44	India	Twelfth place (1948)	2	Asia – AASF
44	Iran	Twelfth place (1976)	1	Asia – AASF
44	Slovakia	Twelfth place (2000)	1	Europe – LEN
44	South Korea	Twelfth place (1988^{*})	1	Asia – AASF
44	Ukraine	Twelfth place (1996)	1	Europe – LEN
49	Uruguay	Thirteenth place (1936)	2	Americas – UANA
50	Iceland	Fifteenth place (1936)	1	Europe – LEN
51	Chile	Seventeenth place (1948)	1	Americas – UANA
52	Portugal	Twentieth place (1952)	1	Europe – LEN
Rk	Men's team	Best finish	Apps	Confederation

=== Finishes in the top four ===
The following table is pre-sorted by total finishes in the top four (in descending order), number of Olympic gold medals (in descending order), number of Olympic silver medals (in descending order), number of Olympic bronze medals (in descending order), name of the team (in ascending order), respectively. Last updated: 8 August 2021.

Legend

- Year^{*} – As host team
- Team^{†} – Defunct team

Rk	Men's team	Total	Champions	Runners-up	Third place	Fourth place	First	Last
1	Hungary	18	9 (1932, 1936, 1952, 1956, 1964, 1976, 2000, 2004, 2008)	3 (1928, 1948, 1972)	4 (1960, 1968, 1980, 2020)	2 (1996, 2024)	1928	2024
2	Italy	11	3 (1948, 1960^{*}, 1992)	2 (1976, 2012)	3 (1952, 1996, 2016)	3 (1956, 1964, 1968)	1948	2016
3	United States	10		3 (1984^{*}, 1988, 2008)	4 (1924, 1932^{*}, 1972, 2024)	3 (1920, 1952, 1992)	1920	2024
4	Yugoslavia^{†}	8	3 (1968, 1984, 1988)	4 (1952, 1956, 1964, 1980)		1 (1960)	1952	1988
5	Soviet Union^{†}	7	2 (1972, 1980^{*})	2 (1960, 1968)	3 (1956, 1964, 1988)		1956	1988
6	Belgium	7		4 (1900, 1908, 1920^{*}, 1924)	2 (1912, 1936)	1 (1948)	1900	1948
7	Spain	6	1 (1996)	1 (1992^{*})		4 (1980, 1984, 2000, 2020)	1980	2020
8	Great Britain	5	4 (1900, 1908^{*}, 1912, 1920)			1 (1928)	1900	1928
9	Serbia	5	3 (2016, 2020, 2024)		2 (2008, 2012)		2008	2024
10	France	5	1 (1924^{*})		3 (1900^{*}×2, 1928)	1 (1936)	1900	1936
11	Croatia	4	1 (2012)	3 (1996, 2016, 2024)			1996	2024
12	Sweden	4		1 (1912^{*})	2 (1908, 1920)	1 (1924)	1908	1924
13	Germany	3	1 (1928)	2 (1932, 1936^{*})			1928	1936
14	Netherlands	3			2 (1948, 1976)	1 (1908)	1908	1976
15	West Germany^{†}	3			1 (1984)	2 (1972^{*}, 1988)	1972	1988
16	Montenegro	3				3 (2008, 2012, 2016)	2008	2016
17	Russia	2		1 (2000)	1 (2004)		2000	2004
18	Greece	2		1 (2020)		1 (2004^{*})	2004	2020
19	Serbia and Montenegro^{†}	1		1 (2004)			2004	2004
20	Yugoslavia^{†}	1			1 (2000)		2000	2000
20	(International Olympic Committee) Unified Team^{†}	1			1 (1992)		1992	1992
22	Austria	1				1 (1912)	1912	1912
22	Japan	1				1 (1932)	1932	1932
22	Romania	1				1 (1976)	1976	1976
Rk	Men's team	Total	Champions	Runners-up	Third place	Fourth place	First	Last

=== Medal table ===
The following table is pre-sorted by number of Olympic gold medals (in descending order), number of Olympic silver medals (in descending order), number of Olympic bronze medals (in descending order), name of the team (in ascending order), respectively. Last updated: 11 August 2024.

Hungary is the most successful country in the men's Olympic water polo tournament, with nine gold, three silver and four bronze.

Legend

- Team^{†} – Defunct team

Rank	Men's team	Gold	Silver	Bronze	Total
1	Hungary (HUN)	9	3	4	16
2	Great Britain (GBR) (Note: A British team won the gold medal in 1900. Although Victor Lindberg, a member of the team, was a New Zealander, the IOC attributed the gold medal to Great Britain based on the team's club affiliation.)	4	0	0	4
3	Yugoslavia (YUG)^{†}	3	4	0	7
4	Italy (ITA)	3	2	3	8
5	Serbia (SRB)	3	0	2	5
6	Soviet Union (URS)^{†}	2	2	3	7
7	United States (USA) (Note: Previously, the International Olympic Committee and International Swimming Federation (FINA) considered the water polo event at the 1904 Olympics as a demonstration sport. However, in July 2021, after accepting the recommendation of Olympic historian Bill Mallon, the IOC recognized water polo along with several others as an official sport of the 1904 Olympic program.)	1	4	5	10
8	Croatia (CRO)	1	3	0	4
9	Germany (GER)	1	2	0	3
10	Spain (ESP)	1	1	0	2
11	France (FRA)	1	0	3	4
12	Belgium (BEL)	0	4	2	6
13	Sweden (SWE)	0	1	2	3
14	Russia (RUS)	0	1	1	2
14	Serbia and Montenegro (SCG)^{†}	0	1	1	2
16	Greece (GRE)	0	1	0	1
17	Netherlands (NED)	0	0	2	2
18	Unified Team^{†}	0	0	1	1
18	West Germany (FRG)^{†}	0	0	1	1
Totals (19 entries)		29	29	30	88

=== Champions (results) ===
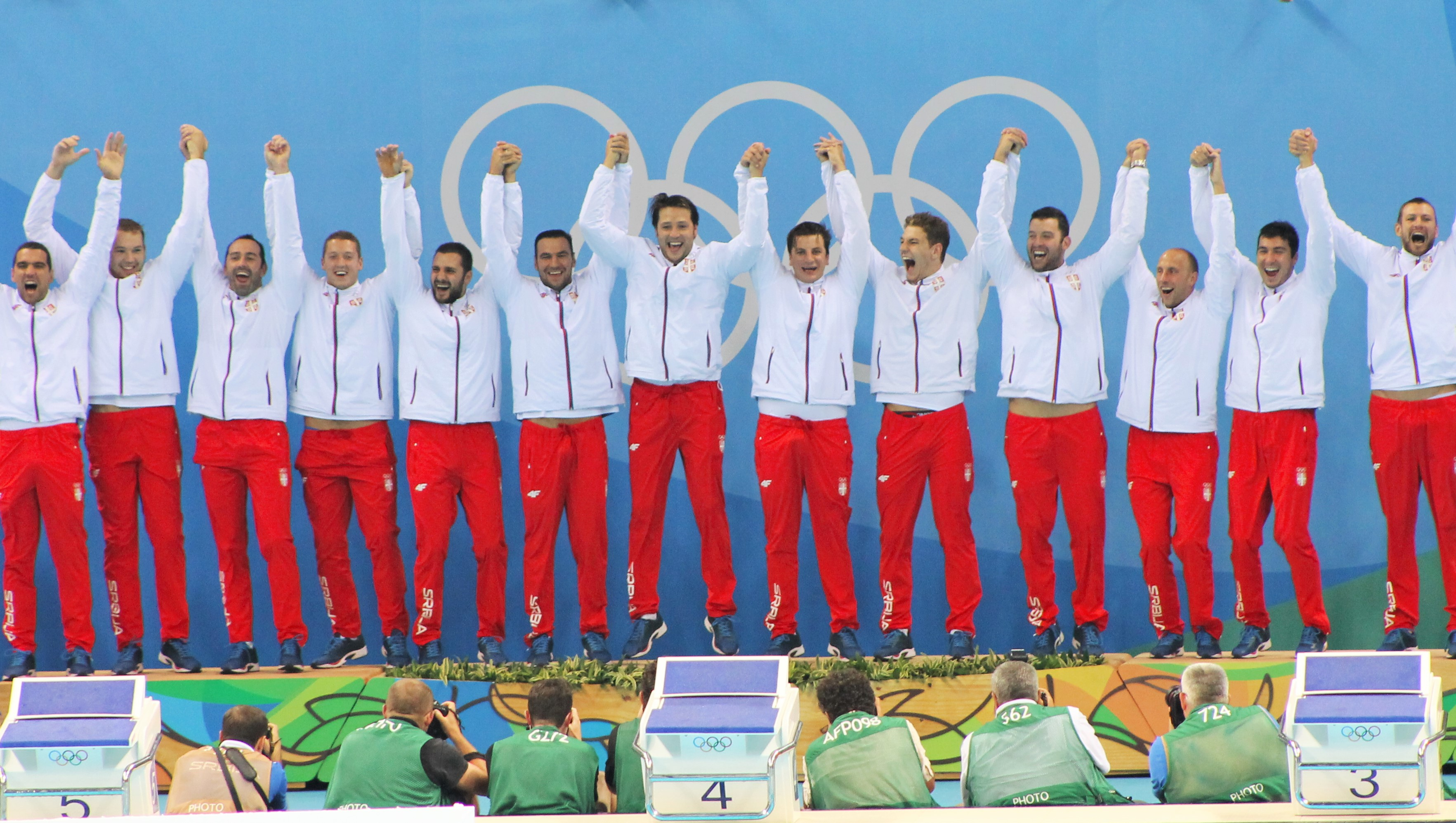
Serbia men's national water polo team celebrated after the gold medal match of the 2016 Summer Olympics.

The following table shows results of Olympic champions in men's water polo by tournament. Last updated: 8 August 2021.

Legend

- 6 – Winning 6 matches during the tournament
- 4 – Drawing 4 matches during the tournament
- 2 – Losing 2 matches during the tournament
- 100.0% – Winning all matches during the tournament
- Team – Olympic winning streak (winning three or more Olympic titles in a row)
- Team – Host team
- Team^{†} – Defunct team

Abbreviation

- MP – Matches played
- W – Won
- D – Drawn
- L – Lost
- GF – Goals for
- GA – Goals against
- GD – Goal difference
- GF/MP – Goals for per match
- GA/MP – Goals against per match
- GD/MP – Goal difference per match

Results of champions by tournament
#	Men's tournament	Champions	MP	W	D	L	Win %	GF	GA	GD	GF/MP	GA/MP	GD/MP
1	Paris 1900	Great Britain (1st title)	3	3	0	0	100.0%	29	3	26	9.667	1.000	8.667
2	St. Louis 1904	Water polo was a demonstration sport											
3	London 1908	Great Britain (2nd title)	1 (Note: Having drawn a bye in the first round and having received a walkover against Austria in the semi-final, the final was the only match that Great Britain played during the tournament.)	1	0	0	100.0%	9	2	7	9.000	2.000	7.000
4	Stockholm 1912	Great Britain (3rd title)	3	3	0	0	100.0%	21	8	13	7.000	2.667	4.333
5	Antwerp 1920	Great Britain (4th title)	3	3	0	0	100.0%	19	4	15	6.333	1.333	5.000
6	Paris 1924	France (1st title)	4	4	0	0	100.0%	16	6	10	4.000	1.500	2.500
7	Amsterdam 1928	Germany (1st title)	3	3	0	0	100.0%	18	10	8	6.000	3.333	2.667
8	Los Angeles 1932	Hungary (1st title)	3	3	0	0	100.0%	30	2	28	10.000	0.667	9.333
9	Berlin 1936	Hungary (2nd title)	7	6	1	0	85.7%	44	4	40	6.286	0.571	5.714
10	London 1948	Italy (1st title)	7	6	1	0	85.7%	35	14	21	5.000	2.000	3.000
11	Helsinki 1952	Hungary (3rd title)	8	6	2	0	75.0%	53	16	37	6.625	2.000	4.625
12	Melbourne 1956	Hungary (4th title)	6	6	0	0	100.0%	26	4	22	4.333	0.667	3.667
13	Rome 1960	Italy (2nd title)	7	6	1	0	85.7%	31	12	19	4.429	1.714	2.714
14	Tokyo 1964	Hungary (5th title)	6	5	1	0	83.3%	34	13	21	5.667	2.167	3.500
15	Mexico City 1968	Yugoslavia^{†} (1st title)	9	7	1	1	77.8%	86	35	51	9.556	3.889	5.667
16	Munich 1972	Soviet Union^{†} (1st title)	8	6	2	0	75.0%	48	24	24	6.000	3.000	3.000
17	Montreal 1976	Hungary (6th title)	8	7	1	0	87.5%	45	32	13	5.625	4.000	1.625
18	Moscow 1980	Soviet Union^{†} (2nd title)	8	8	0	0	100.0%	58	31	27	7.250	3.875	3.375
19	Los Angeles 1984	Yugoslavia^{†} (2nd title)	7	6	1	0	85.7%	72	44	28	10.286	6.286	4.000
20	Seoul 1988	Yugoslavia^{†} (3rd title)	7	6	0	1	85.7%	83	55	28	11.857	7.857	4.000
21	Barcelona 1992	Italy (3rd title)	7	5	2	0	71.4%	59	50	9	8.429	7.143	1.286
22	Atlanta 1996	Spain (1st title)	8	6	0	2	75.0%	58	48	10	7.250	6.000	1.250
23	Sydney 2000	Hungary (7th title)	8	6	0	2	75.0%	78	57	21	9.750	7.125	2.625
24	Athens 2004	Hungary (8th title)	7	7	0	0	100.0%	59	39	20	8.429	5.571	2.857
25	Beijing 2008	Hungary (9th title)	7	6	1	0	85.7%	85	55	30	12.143	7.857	4.286
26	London 2012	Croatia (1st title)	8	8	0	0	100.0%	73	42	31	9.125	5.250	3.875
27	Rio 2016	Serbia (1st title)	8	5	2	1	62.5%	80	66	14	10.000	8.250	1.750
28	Tokyo 2020	Serbia (2nd title)	8	6	0	2	75.0%	103	71	32	12.875	8.875	4.000
29	Paris 2024	Serbia (3rd title)	8	5	0	3	62.5%	93	91	2	11.625	11.375	0.250
#	Men's tournament	Total	177	148	16	12	84.2%	1445	838	607	7.638	4.734	3.429
#	Men's tournament	Champions	MP	W	D	L	Win %	GF	GA	GD	GF/MP	GA/MP	GD/MP

Sources:

- Official Reports (PDF): 1900–1996 (men's tournaments);
- Official Results Books (PDF): 2000 (pp. 45–92), 2004 (p. 207), 2008 (p. 202), 2012 (p. 471), 2016 (p. 131), 2020 (p. 150);
- Olympedia: 1900–2020 (men's tournaments);
- Sports Reference: 1900–2016 (men's tournaments).

From 1900 to 1928, single-elimination tournaments were used to determine Olympic champions in men's water polo. The following table shows men's teams that won all matches during the Olympic tournament since 1932.

Winning all matches during the tournament (since 1932)
#	Year	Champions	MP	W	D	L	Win %
1	1932	Hungary (1st title)	3	3	0	0	100.0%
2	1956	Hungary (4th title)	6	6	0	0	100.0%
3	1980	Soviet Union^{†} (2nd title)	8	8	0	0	100.0%
4	2004	Hungary (8th title)	7	7	0	0	100.0%
5	2012	Croatia (1st title)	8	8	0	0	100.0%

The following tables show records of goals for per match.

Top 5 most goals for per match
Rk	Year	Champions	MP	GF	GF/MP
1	2020	Serbia (2nd title)	8	103	12.875
2	2008	Hungary (9th title)	7	85	12.143
3	1988	Yugoslavia^{†} (3rd title)	7	83	11.857
4	2024	Serbia (3rd title)	8	93	11.625
5	1984	Yugoslavia^{†} (2nd title)	7	72	10.286

Top 5 fewest goals for per match
Rk	Year	Champions	MP	GF	GF/MP
1	1924	France (1st title)	4	16	4.000
2	1956	Hungary (4th title)	6	26	4.333
3	1960	Italy (2nd title)	7	31	4.429
4	1948	Italy (1st title)	7	35	5.000
5	1976	Hungary (6th title)	8	45	5.625

Historical progression of records: Goals for per match
Goals for per match	Achievement	Year	Champions	Date of winning gold	Duration of record
9.667	Set record	1900	Great Britain (1st title)	12 August 1900	32 years, 1 day
10.000	Broke record	1932	Hungary (1st title)	13 August 1932	51 years, 363 days
10.286	Broke record	1984	Yugoslavia^{†} (2nd title)	10 August 1984	4 years, 52 days
11.857	Broke record	1988	Yugoslavia^{†} (3rd title)	1 October 1988	19 years, 328 days
12.143	Broke record	2008	Hungary (9th title)	24 August 2008	12 years, 349 days
12.875	Broke record	2020	Serbia (2nd title)	8 August 2021	5 years, 6 days

The following tables show records of goals against per match.

Top 5 most goals against per match
Rk	Year	Champions	MP	GA	GA/MP
1	2024	Serbia (3rd title)	8	91	11.375
2	2020	Serbia (2nd title)	8	71	8.875
3	2016	Serbia (1st title)	8	66	8.250
4	1988	Yugoslavia^{†} (3rd title)	7	55	7.857
4	2008	Hungary (9th title)	7	55	7.857

Top 5 fewest goals against per match
Rk	Year	Champions	MP	GA	GA/MP
1	1936	Hungary (2nd title)	7	4	0.571
2	1932	Hungary (1st title)	3	2	0.667
2	1956	Hungary (4th title)	6	4	0.667
4	1900	Great Britain (1st title)	3	3	1.000
5	1920	Great Britain (4th title)	3	4	1.333

The following tables show records of goal difference per match.

Top 5 most goal difference per match
Rk	Year	Champions	MP	GD	GD/MP
1	1932	Hungary (1st title)	3	28	9.333
2	1900	Great Britain (1st title)	3	26	8.667
3	1908	Great Britain (2nd title)	1	7	7.000
4	1936	Hungary (2nd title)	7	40	5.714
5	1968	Yugoslavia^{†} (1st title)	9	51	5.667

Top 5 fewest goal difference per match
Rk	Year	Champions	MP	GD	GD/MP
1	2024	Serbia (3rd title)	8	2	0.250
2	1996	Spain (1st title)	8	10	1.250
3	1992	Italy (3rd title)	7	9	1.286
4	1976	Hungary (6th title)	8	13	1.625
5	2016	Serbia (1st title)	8	14	1.750

=== Champions (squads) ===
The following table shows number of players and average age, height and weight of Olympic champions in men's water polo by tournament. Last updated: 30 August 2021.

Legend

- Team – Olympic winning streak
- Team – Winning all matches during the tournament
- Team – Host team
- Team^{†} – Defunct team

Winning squads by tournament
#	Men's tournament	Champions	Players	Returning Olympians		Average		
#	Men's tournament	Champions	Number	Number	%	Age	Height	Weight
1	Paris 1900	Great Britain (1st title)	7	0	0.0%			
2	St. Louis 1904	Water polo was a demonstration sport						
3	London 1908	Great Britain (2nd title)	7	0	0.0%	26 years, 111 days		
4	Stockholm 1912	Great Britain (3rd title)	7	4	57.1%	29 years, 16 days		
5	Antwerp 1920	Great Britain (4th title)	7	3	42.9%	33 years, 279 days		
6	Paris 1924	France (1st title)	7	3	42.9%	26 years, 303 days		
7	Amsterdam 1928	Germany (1st title)	8	0	0.0%	24 years, 329 days		
8	Los Angeles 1932	Hungary (1st title)	10	7	70.0%	27 years, 291 days		
9	Berlin 1936	Hungary (2nd title)	11	5	45.5%	26 years, 66 days		
10	London 1948	Italy (1st title)	9	0	0.0%	30 years, 203 days		
11	Helsinki 1952	Hungary (3rd title)	13	6	46.2%	26 years, 337 days		
12	Melbourne 1956	Hungary (4th title)	12	7	58.3%	26 years, 148 days	1.81 m (5 ft 11 in) (Note: Average height of 9 players.)	80 kg (176 lb) (Note: Average weight of 8 players.)
13	Rome 1960	Italy (2nd title)	12	3	25.0%	22 years, 363 days	1.82 m (6 ft 0 in)	81 kg (179 lb)
14	Tokyo 1964	Hungary (5th title)	12	10	83.3%	28 years, 208 days	1.82 m (6 ft 0 in)	82 kg (181 lb)
15	Mexico City 1968	Yugoslavia^{†} (1st title)	11	5	45.5%	26 years, 151 days	1.90 m (6 ft 3 in)	94 kg (207 lb)
16	Munich 1972	Soviet Union^{†} (1st title)	11	5	45.5%	26 years, 351 days	1.84 m (6 ft 0 in)	87 kg (192 lb)
17	Montreal 1976	Hungary (6th title)	11	6	54.5%	25 years, 333 days	1.87 m (6 ft 2 in)	88 kg (194 lb)
18	Moscow 1980	Soviet Union^{†} (2nd title)	11	4	36.4%	25 years, 117 days	1.84 m (6 ft 0 in)	87 kg (192 lb)
19	Los Angeles 1984	Yugoslavia^{†} (2nd title)	13	3	23.1%	23 years, 362 days	1.93 m (6 ft 4 in)	92 kg (203 lb)
20	Seoul 1988	Yugoslavia^{†} (3rd title)	13	6	46.2%	23 years, 341 days	1.95 m (6 ft 5 in)	94 kg (207 lb)
21	Barcelona 1992	Italy (3rd title)	13	7	53.8%	26 years, 224 days	1.86 m (6 ft 1 in) (Note: Average height of 11 players.)	81 kg (179 lb) (Note: Average weight of 11 players.)
22	Atlanta 1996	Spain (1st title)	13	9	69.2%	26 years, 279 days	1.86 m (6 ft 1 in)	81 kg (179 lb)
23	Sydney 2000	Hungary (7th title)	13	5	38.5%	25 years, 254 days	1.93 m (6 ft 4 in)	93 kg (205 lb)
24	Athens 2004	Hungary (8th title)	13	10	76.9%	27 years, 344 days	1.96 m (6 ft 5 in)	96 kg (212 lb)
25	Beijing 2008	Hungary (9th title)	13	9	69.2%	29 years, 248 days	1.96 m (6 ft 5 in)	100 kg (220 lb)
26	London 2012	Croatia (1st title)	13	8	61.5%	29 years, 85 days	1.97 m (6 ft 6 in)	102 kg (225 lb)
27	Rio 2016	Serbia (1st title)	13	9	69.2%	28 years, 205 days	1.95 m (6 ft 5 in)	96 kg (212 lb)
28	Tokyo 2020	Serbia (2nd title)	13	10	76.9%	31 years, 250 days	1.94 m (6 ft 4 in)	95 kg (209 lb)
#	Men's tournament	Champions	Number	Number	%	Age	Height	Weight
#	Men's tournament	Champions	Players	Returning Olympians		Average		

Sources:

- Official Reports (PDF): 1900–1996 (men's tournaments);
- Official Results Books (PDF): 2000 (pp. 45–92), 2004 (p. 208), 2008 (p. 203), 2012 (p. 472), 2016 (p. 132), 2020 (p. 151);
- Olympedia: 1900–2020 (men's tournaments);
- Sports Reference: 1900–2016 (men's tournaments).

The following tables show records of the number of returning Olympians.

Records – number of returning Olympians (in descending order)
Rk	Year	Champions	Players	Returning Olympians	
Rk	Year	Champions	Number	Number	%
1	1964	Hungary (5th title)	12	10	83.3%
2	2004	Hungary (8th title)	13	10	76.9%
2	2020	Serbia (2nd title)	13	10	76.9%
4	1932	Hungary (1st title)	10	7	70.0%
5	1996	Spain (1st title)	13	9	69.2%
5	2008	Hungary (9th title)	13	9	69.2%
5	2016	Serbia (1st title)	13	9	69.2%

Records – number of returning Olympians (in ascending order)
Rk	Year	Champions	Players	Returning Olympians	
Rk	Year	Champions	Number	Number	%
1	1948	Italy (1st title)	9	0	0.0%
2	1928	Germany (1st title)	8	0	0.0%
3	1900	Great Britain (1st title)	7	0	0.0%
3	1908	Great Britain (2nd title)	7	0	0.0%
5	1984	Yugoslavia^{†} (2nd title)	13	3	23.1%

The following tables show records of average age.

Top 5 oldest winning squads
Rk	Year	Champions	Average age	Note
1	1920	Great Britain (4th title)	33 years, 279 days	The Games after World War I
2	2020	Serbia (2nd title)	31 years, 250 days	The Games postponed to 2021
3	1948	Italy (1st title)	30 years, 203 days	The Games after World War II
4	2008	Hungary (9th title)	29 years, 248 days	
5	2012	Croatia (1st title)	29 years, 85 days	

Top 5 youngest winning squads
Rk	Year	Champions	Average age
1	1960	Italy (2nd title)	22 years, 363 days
2	1988	Yugoslavia^{†} (3rd title)	23 years, 341 days
3	1984	Yugoslavia^{†} (2nd title)	23 years, 362 days
4	1928	Germany (1st title)	24 years, 329 days
5	1980	Soviet Union^{†} (2nd title)	25 years, 117 days

The following tables show records of average height.

Top 5 tallest winning squads (statistics since 1956)
Rk	Year	Champions	Average height
1	2012	Croatia (1st title)	1.97 m (6 ft 6 in)
2	2004	Hungary (8th title)	1.96 m (6 ft 5 in)
2	2008	Hungary (9th title)	1.96 m (6 ft 5 in)
4	1988	Yugoslavia^{†} (3rd title)	1.95 m (6 ft 5 in)
4	2016	Serbia (1st title)	1.95 m (6 ft 5 in)

Top 5 shortest winning squads (statistics since 1956)
Rk	Year	Champions	Average height
1	1956	Hungary (4th title)	1.81 m (5 ft 11 in)
2	1960	Italy (2nd title)	1.82 m (6 ft 0 in)
2	1964	Hungary (5th title)	1.82 m (6 ft 0 in)
4	1972	Soviet Union^{†} (1st title)	1.84 m (6 ft 0 in)
4	1980	Soviet Union^{†} (2nd title)	1.84 m (6 ft 0 in)

Historical progression of records: Average height (statistics since 1956)
Average height	Achievement	Year	Champions	Date of winning gold	Duration of record
1.81 m (5 ft 11 in)	Set record	1956	Hungary (4th title)	7 December 1956	3 years, 271 days
1.82 m (6 ft 0 in)	Broke record	1960	Italy (2nd title)	3 September 1960	8 years, 53 days
1.82 m (6 ft 0 in)	Tied record	1964	Hungary (5th title)	18 October 1964	8 years, 53 days
1.90 m (6 ft 3 in)	Broke record	1968	Yugoslavia^{†} (1st title)	26 October 1968	15 years, 289 days
1.93 m (6 ft 4 in)	Broke record	1984	Yugoslavia^{†} (2nd title)	10 August 1984	4 years, 52 days
1.95 m (6 ft 5 in)	Broke record	1988	Yugoslavia^{†} (3rd title)	1 October 1988	15 years, 333 days
1.96 m (6 ft 5 in)	Broke record	2004	Hungary (8th title)	29 August 2004	7 years, 349 days
1.96 m (6 ft 5 in)	Tied record	2008	Hungary (9th title)	24 August 2008	7 years, 349 days
1.97 m (6 ft 6 in)	Broke record	2012	Croatia (1st title)	12 August 2012	14 years, 2 days

The following tables show records of average weight.

Top 5 heaviest winning squads (statistics since 1956)
Rk	Year	Champions	Average weight
1	2012	Croatia (1st title)	102 kg (225 lb)
2	2008	Hungary (9th title)	100 kg (220 lb)
3	2004	Hungary (8th title)	96 kg (212 lb)
3	2016	Serbia (1st title)	96 kg (212 lb)
5	2020	Serbia (2nd title)	95 kg (209 lb)

Top 5 lightest winning squads (statistics since 1956)
Rk	Year	Champions	Average weight
1	1956	Hungary (4th title)	80 kg (176 lb)
2	1960	Italy (2nd title)	81 kg (179 lb)
2	1992	Italy (3rd title)	81 kg (179 lb)
2	1996	Spain (1st title)	81 kg (179 lb)
5	1964	Hungary (5th title)	82 kg (181 lb)

Historical progression of records: Average weight (statistics since 1956)
Average weight	Achievement	Year	Champions	Date of winning gold	Duration of record
80 kg (176 lb)	Set record	1956	Hungary (4th title)	7 December 1956	3 years, 271 days
81 kg (179 lb)	Broke record	1960	Italy (2nd title)	3 September 1960	4 years, 45 days
82 kg (181 lb)	Broke record	1964	Hungary (5th title)	18 October 1964	4 years, 8 days
94 kg (207 lb)	Broke record	1968	Yugoslavia^{†} (1st title)	26 October 1968	35 years, 308 days
94 kg (207 lb)	Tied record	1988	Yugoslavia^{†} (3rd title)	1 October 1988	35 years, 308 days
96 kg (212 lb)	Broke record	2004	Hungary (8th title)	29 August 2004	3 years, 361 days
100 kg (220 lb)	Broke record	2008	Hungary (9th title)	24 August 2008	3 years, 354 days
102 kg (225 lb)	Broke record	2012	Croatia (1st title)	12 August 2012	14 years, 2 days

=== Team records ===
Teams having equal quantities in the tables below are ordered by the tournament the quantity was attained in (the teams that attained the quantity first are listed first). If the quantity was attained by more than one team in the same tournament, these teams are ordered alphabetically. Last updated: 8 August 2021.

Legend

- Year^{*} – As host team
- Team^{†} – Defunct team

==== Appearances ====
Most appearances
23, Hungary (1912, 1924, 1928, 1932, 1936, 1948, 1952, 1956, 1960, 1964, 1968, 1972, 1976, 1980, 1988, 1992, 1996, 2000, 2004, 2008, 2012, 2016, 2020).
Most appearances, never winning a title
21, United States (1920, 1924, 1928, 1932^{*}, 1936, 1948, 1952, 1956, 1960, 1964, 1968, 1972, 1984^{*}, 1988, 1992, 1996^{*}, 2000, 2004, 2008, 2012, 2016).
Most appearances, never finishing in the top two
17, Netherlands (1908, 1920, 1924, 1928^{*}, 1936, 1948, 1952, 1960, 1964, 1968, 1972, 1976, 1980, 1984, 1992, 1996, 2000).
Most appearances, never winning a medal
16, Australia (1948, 1952, 1956^{*}, 1960, 1964, 1972, 1976, 1980, 1984, 1988, 1992, 2000^{*}, 2004, 2008, 2012, 2016).
Most appearances, never finishing in the top four
16, Australia (1948, 1952, 1956^{*}, 1960, 1964, 1972, 1976, 1980, 1984, 1988, 1992, 2000^{*}, 2004, 2008, 2012, 2016).
Fewest appearances
1, Luxembourg (1928), Iceland (1936), Chile (1948), Portugal (1952), Singapore (1956), East Germany^{†} (1968), Iran (1976), South Korea (1988^{*}), Unified Team^{†} (1992), Ukraine (1996), Slovakia (2000), Serbia and Montenegro^{†} (2004).
Fewest appearances, winning a title
4, Serbia (2008, 2012, 2016, 2020).
Fewest appearances, finishing in the top two
1, Serbia and Montenegro^{†} (2004).
Fewest appearances, finishing in the top two, active team
3, Russia (1996, 2000, 2004).
Fewest appearances, winning a medal
1, Unified Team^{†} (1992), Serbia and Montenegro^{†} (2004).
Fewest appearances, winning a medal, active team
3, Russia (1996, 2000, 2004).
Fewest appearances, finishing in the top four
1, Unified Team^{†} (1992), Serbia and Montenegro^{†} (2004).
Fewest appearances, finishing in the top four, active team
3, Austria (1912, 1936, 1952), Russia (1996, 2000, 2004).

==== Top four ====
Most titles won
9, Hungary (1932, 1936, 1952, 1956, 1964, 1976, 2000, 2004, 2008).
Most second-place finishes
4, Belgium (1900, 1908, 1920^{*}, 1924), Yugoslavia^{†} (1952, 1956, 1964, 1980).
Most third-place finishes
4, Hungary (1960, 1968, 1980, 2020).
Most fourth-place finishes
4, Spain (1980, 1984, 2000, 2020).
Most finishes in the top two
12, Hungary (1928, 1932, 1936, 1948, 1952, 1956, 1964, 1972, 1976, 2000, 2004, 2008).
Most finishes in the top two, never winning a title
4, Belgium (1900, 1908, 1920^{*}, 1924).
Most finishes in the top three
16, Hungary (1928, 1932, 1936, 1948, 1952, 1956, 1960, 1964, 1968, 1972, 1976, 1980, 2000, 2004, 2008, 2020).
Most finishes in the top three, never winning a title
6, Belgium (1900, 1908, 1912, 1920^{*}, 1924, 1936), United States (1924, 1932, 1972, 1984, 1988, 2008).
Most finishes in the top three, never finishing in the top two
2, Netherlands (1948, 1976).
Most finishes in the top four
17, Hungary (1928, 1932, 1936, 1948, 1952, 1956, 1960, 1964, 1968, 1972, 1976, 1980, 1996, 2000, 2004, 2008, 2020).
Most finishes in the top four, never winning a title
9, United States (1920, 1924, 1932^{*}, 1952, 1972, 1984^{*}, 1988, 1992, 2008).
Most finishes in the top four, never finishing in the top two
3, Netherlands (1908, 1948, 1976), West Germany^{†} (1972^{*}, 1984, 1988), Montenegro (2008, 2012, 2016).
Most finishes in the top four, never winning a medal
3, Montenegro (2008, 2012, 2016).
Fewest finishes in the top two, winning a title
1, France (1924^{*}).
Fewest finishes in the top three, winning a title
2, Spain (1992^{*}, 1996).
Fewest finishes in the top three, finishing in the top two
1, Serbia and Montenegro^{†} (2004), Greece (2020).
Fewest finishes in the top four, winning a title
3, Germany (1928, 1932, 1936^{*}), Croatia (1996, 2012, 2016).
Fewest finishes in the top four, finishing in the top two
1, Serbia and Montenegro^{†} (2004).
Fewest finishes in the top four, finishing in the top two, active team
2, Russia (2000, 2004), Greece (2004, 2020).
Fewest finishes in the top four, winning a medal
1, Unified Team^{†} (1992), FR Yugoslavia^{†} (2000), Serbia and Montenegro^{†} (2004).
Fewest finishes in the top four, winning a medal, active team
2, Russia (2000, 2004), Greece (2004, 2020).

==== Consecutive ====
Most consecutive titles won
3, Great Britain (1908^{*}–1912–1920), Hungary (2000–2004–2008), Serbia (2016-2020-2024).
Most consecutive second-place finishes
2, Belgium (1920^{*}–1924), Germany (1932–1936^{*}), Yugoslavia^{†} (1952–1956), United States (1984^{*}–1988).
Most consecutive third-place finishes
2, Serbia (2008–2012).
Most consecutive fourth-place finishes
3, Montenegro (2008–2012–2016).
Most consecutive finishes in the top two
6, Hungary (1928–1932–1936–1948–1952–1956).
Most consecutive finishes in the top three
12, Hungary (1928–1932–1936–1948–1952–1956–1960–1964–1968–1972–1976–1980).
Most consecutive finishes in the top four
12, Hungary (1928–1932–1936–1948–1952–1956–1960–1964–1968–1972–1976–1980).
Most consecutive appearances
19, Italy (1948–1952–1956–1960^{*}–1964–1968–1972–1976–1980–1984–1988–1992–1996–2000–2004–2008–2012–2016–2020).
Biggest improvement in position in consecutive tournaments
Did not participate/qualify, then won the title, Germany (1924–1928), Italy (1936–1948).

==== Gaps ====
Longest gap between successive titles
24 years, Hungary (1976–2000).
Longest gap between successive second-place finishes
36 years, Italy (1976–2012).
Longest gap between successive third-place finishes
44 years, Italy (1952–1996).
Longest gap between successive fourth-place finishes
40 years, United States (1952–1992).
Longest gap between successive appearances in the top two
24 years, Hungary (1976–2000).
Longest gap between successive appearances in the top three
40 years, United States (1932^{*}–1972).
Longest gap between successive appearances in the top four
40 years, Netherlands (1908–1948).
Longest gap between successive appearances
61 years, South Africa (1960–2020).

==== Debuting teams ====
Best finish by a debuting team
Champions, Great Britain (1900).
Best finish by a debuting team after 1900
Runners-up, Croatia (1996), Serbia and Montenegro^{†} (2004).
Worst finish by a debuting team
20th position, Portugal (1952).
Worst finish by a debuting team after 1972
12th position (last position), Iran (1976), South Korea (1988^{*}), Ukraine (1996), Slovakia (2000).

==== Host teams ====
Best finish by host team
Champions, Great Britain (1908^{*}), France (1924^{*}), Italy (1960^{*}), Soviet Union^{†} (1980^{*}).
Worst finish by host team
Did not participate/qualify, Finland (1952^{*}).
Worst finish by host team that participates in the tournament
13th position, Great Britain (1948^{*}).
Worst finish by host team that participates in the tournament after 1972
12th position (last position), South Korea (1988^{*}), China (2008^{*}), Great Britain (2012^{*}).
Best finish by last host team
Champions, Great Britain (1912), Spain (1996).
Worst finish by last host team
Did not participate/qualify, Netherlands (1932), Germany (1948), Canada (1980), Soviet Union^{†} (1984, withdrew), South Korea (1992), China (2012), Great Britain (2016), Brazil (2020).
Worst finish by last host team that participates in the tournament
15th position, Australia (1960).
Worst finish by last host team that participates in the tournament after 1972
9th position, Australia (2004).
Had its best performance as hosts
Champions, Great Britain (1908^{*}), France (1924^{*}), Italy (1960^{*}), Soviet Union^{†} (1980^{*}).
Runners-up, Sweden (1912^{*}), Belgium (1920^{*}), United States (1984^{*}).
9th position, Canada (1976^{*}).
12th position, South Korea (1988^{*}).
Had its worst performance as hosts
12th position, South Korea (1988^{*}), China (2008^{*}).
13th position, Great Britain (1948^{*}).
Had its worst performance as hosts after 1972
12th position (last position), South Korea (1988^{*}), China (2008^{*}), Great Britain (2012^{*}).

==== Defending champions ====
Best finish by defending champions
Champions, Great Britain (1912, 1920), Hungary (1936, 1956, 2004, 2008), Yugoslavia^{†} (1988), Serbia (2020).
Worst finish by defending champions
Did not participate/qualify, Soviet Union^{†} (1984, withdrew), Yugoslavia^{†} (1992, defunct).
Worst finish by defending champions that participates in the next tournament
8th position, Great Britain (1924), Soviet Union^{†} (1976).

==== Defending runners-up ====
Best finish by defending runners-up
Champions, Hungary (1932, 1952, 1976), Soviet Union^{†} (1972), Spain (1996), Yugoslavia^{†} (1968, 1984).
Worst finish by defending runners-up
Did not participate/qualify, Germany (1948), Serbia and Montenegro^{†} (2008, defunct).
Worst finish by defending runners-up that participates in the next tournament
8th position, Italy (1980), United States (2012).

==== Population ====
Most populated country, participant
China (2008^{*}), 1,324,655,000 (source)
Least populated country, participant
Iceland (1928), 104,000 (source)
Least populated country, participant, after 1972
Montenegro (2008), 616,000 (source)
Most populated country, hosts
China (2008^{*}), 1,324,655,000 (source)
Least populated country, hosts
Finland (1952^{*}), 4,090,000 (source)
Most populated country, champions
Soviet Union^{†} (1980^{*}), more than 260,000,000 (source)
Least populated country, champions
Croatia (2012), 4,267,000 (source)
Most populated country, runners-up
United States (2008), 304,375,000 (source)
Least populated country, runners-up
Croatia (1996), 4,516,000 (source)
Most populated country, third place
Unified Team^{†} (1992), more than 280,000,000 (source)
Least populated country, third place
Sweden (1908), 5,404,000 (source)
Most populated country, fourth place
United States (1992), 256,514,000 (source)
Least populated country, fourth place
Montenegro (2008), 616,000 (source)

== Player statistics ==
=== Age records ===
The following tables show the oldest and youngest players who competed in men's water polo at the Summer Olympics, and the oldest and youngest male Olympic medalists in water polo. Last updated: 1 April 2021.

Legend

- Team – Host team
- Player^{‡} – Player who won the tournament with his team

Appearance

Record	Age of the first Olympic water polo match	Player	Men's team	Pos	Date of birth	Date of the first Olympic water polo match	Ref
Oldest Olympic debutant	42 years, 303 days	Alexandr Polukhin	Kazakhstan	GK	15 October 1961	13 August 2004	
Youngest male Olympian	14 years, 133 days	Alfonso Tusell	Spain	FP	11 April 1906	22 August 1920	

Record	Age of the last Olympic water polo match	Player	Men's team	Pos	Date of birth	Date of the last Olympic water polo match	Ref
Oldest male Olympian	45 years, 169 days	Charles Smith	Great Britain	GK	26 January 1879	13 July 1924	

Medalist

Record	Age of receiving the last Olympic gold/silver/bronze medal in water polo	Player	Men's team	Pos	Date of birth	Date of receiving the last Olympic gold/silver/bronze medal in water polo	Ref
Oldest male Olympic gold medalist	41 years, 216 days	Charles Smith^{‡}	Great Britain	GK	26 January 1879	29 August 1920	
Oldest male Olympic silver medalist	41 years, 128 days	Boris Goykhman	Soviet Union	GK	28 April 1919	3 September 1960	
Oldest male Olympic bronze medalist	37 years, 223 days	Boris Goykhman	Soviet Union	GK	28 April 1919	7 December 1956	

Record	Age of receiving the first Olympic gold/silver/bronze medal in water polo	Player	Men's team	Pos	Date of birth	Date of receiving the first Olympic gold/silver/bronze medal in water polo	Ref
Youngest male Olympic gold medalist	17 years, 40 days	György Kárpáti^{‡}	Hungary	FP	23 June 1935	2 August 1952	
Youngest male Olympic silver medalist	18 years, 334 days	Herman Meyboom	Belgium	FP	23 August 1889	July 22, 1908	
Youngest male Olympic bronze medalist	15 years, 306 days	Paul Vasseur	France	FP	10 October 1884	12 August 1900	

=== Multiple appearances (five-time Olympians) ===
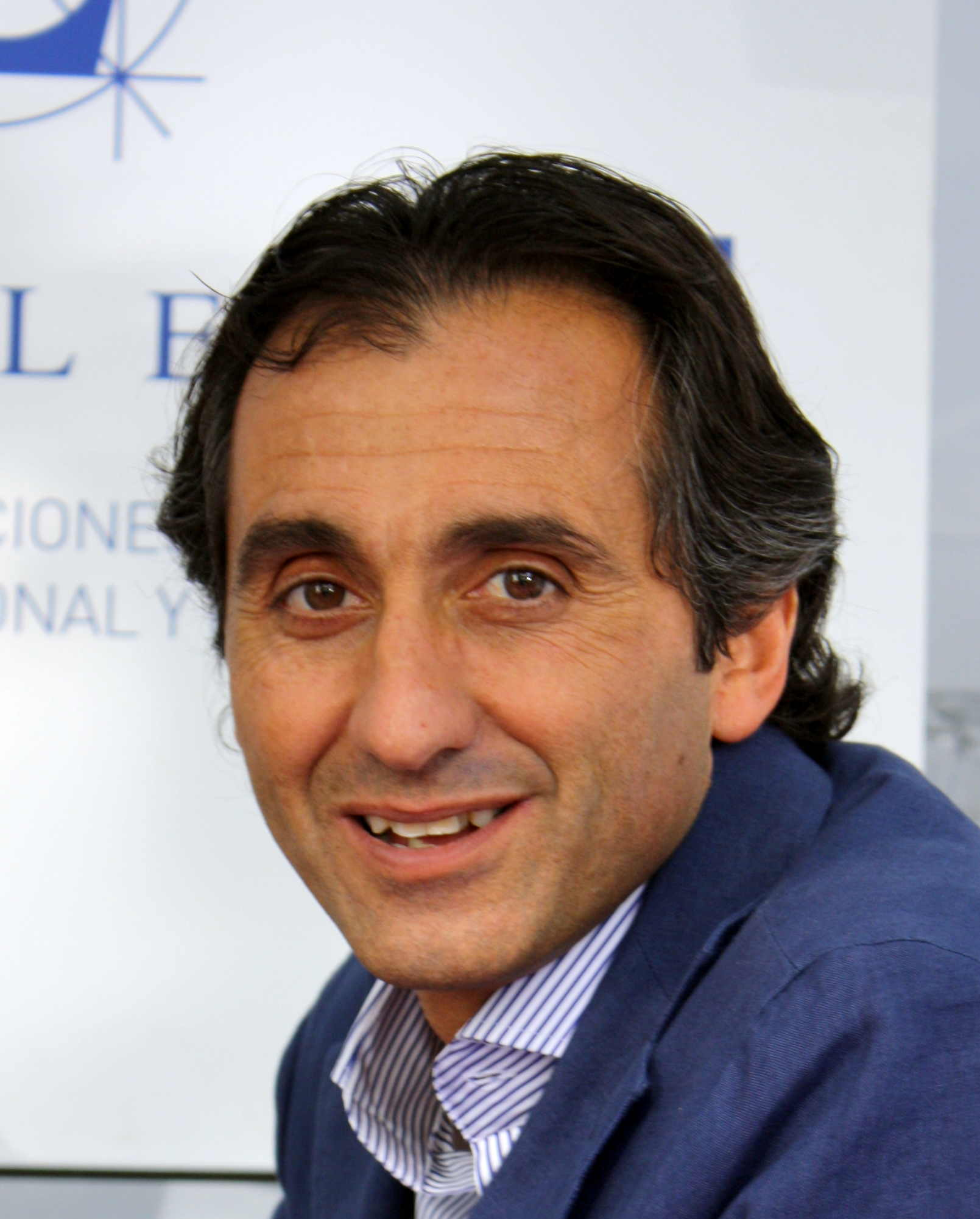
Manuel Estiarte of Spain is the only water polo player to compete at six Olympic Games (1980–2000).

The following table is pre-sorted by number of Olympic appearances (in descending order), year of the last Olympic appearance (in ascending order), year of the first Olympic appearance (in ascending order), date of birth (in ascending order), name of the player (in ascending order), respectively. Last updated: 26 July 2021.

Seventeen athletes competed in water polo at five or more Olympic Games between 1900 and 2020 inclusive. Paul Radmilovic, representing Great Britain, is the first water polo player to compete at five Olympics (1908–1928).

Four players (Manuel Estiarte, Salvador Gómez, Jesús Rollán and Jordi Sans) were all members of the Spain men's national water polo team (1988–2000). Manuel Estiarte is the first and only water polo player (man or woman) to compete at six Olympics (1980–2000). Jesús Rollán is the first water polo goalkeeper of either gender to compete at five Olympics (1984–2004).

Tony Azevedo of the United States is the first non-European water polo player to compete at five Olympic Games (2000–2016).

Italian goalkeeper Stefano Tempesti competed at five Olympics between 2000 and 2016.

Legend and abbreviation

- – Hosts
- Apps – Appearances

Male athletes who competed in water polo at five or more Olympics
Apps	Player	Birth	Height	Men's team	Pos	Water polo tournaments						Period (age of first/last)	Medals				Ref
Apps	Player	Birth	Height	Men's team	Pos	1	2	3	4	5	6	Period (age of first/last)	G	S	B	T	Ref
6	Manuel Estiarte	1961	1.78 m (5 ft 10 in)	Spain	FP	1980	1984	1988	1992	1996	2000	20 years (18/38)	1	1	0	2	
5	Paul Radmilovic	1886	1.80 m (5 ft 11 in)	Great Britain	FP	1908	1912	1920	1924	1928		20 years (22/42)	3	0	0	3	
5	Dezső Gyarmati	1927	1.86 m (6 ft 1 in)	Hungary	FP	1948	1952	1956	1960	1964		16 years (20/36)	3	1	1	5	
5	Gianni De Magistris	1950	1.85 m (6 ft 1 in)	Italy	FP	1968	1972	1976	1980	1984		16 years (17/33)	0	1	0	1	
5	Jordi Sans	1965	1.80 m (5 ft 11 in)	Spain	FP	1984	1988	1992	1996	2000		16 years (18/35)	1	1	0	2	
5	George Mavrotas	1967	1.75 m (5 ft 9 in)	Greece	FP	1984	1988	1992	1996	2000		16 years (17/33)	0	0	0	0	
5	Salvador Gómez	1968	1.94 m (6 ft 4 in)	Spain	FP	1988	1992	1996	2000	2004		16 years (20/36)	1	1	0	2	
5	Jesús Rollán	1968	1.87 m (6 ft 2 in)	Spain	GK	1988	1992	1996	2000	2004		16 years (20/36)	1	1	0	2	
5	Tibor Benedek	1972	1.90 m (6 ft 3 in)	Hungary	FP	1992	1996	2000	2004	2008		16 years (20/36)	3	0	0	3	
5	Igor Hinić	1975	2.02 m (6 ft 8 in)	Croatia	FP	1996	2000	2004	2008	2012		16 years (20/36)	1	1	0	2	
5	Tamás Kásás	1976	2.00 m (6 ft 7 in)	Hungary	FP	1996	2000	2004	2008	2012		16 years (20/36)	3	0	0	3	
5	Georgios Afroudakis	1976	1.94 m (6 ft 4 in)	Greece	FP	1996	2000	2004	2008	2012		16 years (19/35)	0	0	0	0	
5	Stefano Tempesti	1979	2.05 m (6 ft 9 in)	Italy	GK	2000	2004	2008	2012	2016		16 years (21/37)	0	1	1	2	
5	Tony Azevedo	1981	1.85 m (6 ft 1 in)	United States	FP	2000	2004	2008	2012	2016		16 years (18/34)	0	1	0	1	
5	Jesse Smith	1983	1.93 m (6 ft 4 in)	United States	FP	2004	2008	2012	2016	2020		17 years (21/38)	0	1	0	1	
5	Xavier García	1984	1.98 m (6 ft 6 in)	Spain	FP	2004	2008	2012				17 years (20/37)	0	1	0	1	
5	Xavier García	1984	1.98 m (6 ft 6 in)	Croatia	FP				2016	2020		17 years (20/37)	0	1	0	1	
5	Pietro Figlioli	1984	1.91 m (6 ft 3 in)	Australia	FP	2004	2008					17 years (20/37)	0	1	1	2	
5	Pietro Figlioli	1984	1.91 m (6 ft 3 in)	Italy	FP			2012	2016	2020		17 years (20/37)	0	1	1	2	
Apps	Player	Birth	Height	Men's team	Pos	1	2	3	4	5	6	Period (age of first/last)	G	S	B	T	Ref
Apps	Player	Birth	Height	Men's team	Pos	Water polo tournaments						Period (age of first/last)	Medals				Ref

=== Multiple medalists ===
The following table is pre-sorted by total number of Olympic medals (in descending order), number of Olympic gold medals (in descending order), number of Olympic silver medals (in descending order), year of receiving the last Olympic medal (in ascending order), year of receiving the first Olympic medal (in ascending order), name of the player (in ascending order), respectively. Last updated: 11 August 2024.

Eleven male athletes won four or more Olympic medals in water polo. Among them, seven were members of the Hungary men's national water polo team. Dezső Gyarmati is the first and only athlete (man or woman) to win five Olympic medals in water polo (three gold, one silver and one bronze).

Filip Filipović, Duško Pijetlović and Andrija Prlainović, all representing Serbia, won four consecutive Olympic medals between 2008 and 2021.

Legend

- – Hosts

Male athletes who won four or more Olympic medals in water polo
Rk	Player	Birth	Height	Men's team	Pos	Water polo tournaments					Period (age of first/last)	Medals				Ref
Rk	Player	Birth	Height	Men's team	Pos	1	2	3	4	5	Period (age of first/last)	G	S	B	T	Ref
1	Dezső Gyarmati	1927	1.86 m (6 ft 1 in)	Hungary	FP	1948	1952	1956	1960	1964	16 years (20/36)	3	1	1	5	
2	György Kárpáti	1935	1.67 m (5 ft 6 in)	Hungary	FP	1952	1956	1960	1964		12 years (17/29)	3	0	1	4	
2	Dušan Mandić	1994	2.02 m (6 ft 8 in)	Serbia	FP	2012	2016	2020	2024		12 years (18/30)	3	0	1	4	
4	László Jeney	1923	1.81 m (5 ft 11 in)	Hungary	GK	1948	1952	1956	1960		12 years (25/37)	2	1	1	4	
5	Mihály Mayer	1933	1.85 m (6 ft 1 in)	Hungary	FP	1956	1960	1964	1968		12 years (22/34)	2	0	2	4	
5	Filip Filipović	1987	1.96 m (6 ft 5 in)	Serbia	FP	2008	2012	2016	2020		13 years (21/34)	2	0	2	4	
5	Duško Pijetlović	1985	1.97 m (6 ft 6 in)	Serbia	FP	2008	2012	2016	2020		13 years (23/36)	2	0	2	4	
5	Andrija Prlainović	1987	1.87 m (6 ft 2 in)	Serbia	FP	2008	2012	2016	2020		13 years (21/34)	2	0	2	4	
9	András Bodnár	1942	1.80 m (5 ft 11 in)	Hungary	FP	1960	1964	1968	1972		12 years (18/30)	1	1	2	4	
9	Endre Molnár	1945	1.85 m (6 ft 1 in)	Hungary	GK	1968	1972	1976	1980		12 years (23/35)	1	1	2	4	
9	István Szívós Jr.	1948	2.02 m (6 ft 8 in)	Hungary	FP	1968	1972	1976	1980		12 years (20/32)	1	1	2	4	
12	Joseph Pletincx	1888		Belgium	FP	1908	1912	1920	1924		16 years (20/36)	0	3	1	4	
Rk	Player	Birth	Height	Men's team	Pos	1	2	3	4	5	Period (age of first/last)	G	S	B	T	Ref
Rk	Player	Birth	Height	Men's team	Pos	Water polo tournaments					Period (age of first/last)	Medals				Ref

Sources:

- Sports Reference: Athlete Medal Leaders (1900–2016);
- Official Results Books (PDF): 2000 (p. 27), 2004 (p. 89), 2008 (p. 79), 2012 (p. 370), 2016 (p. 6), 2020 (p. 11).

=== Multiple gold medalists ===
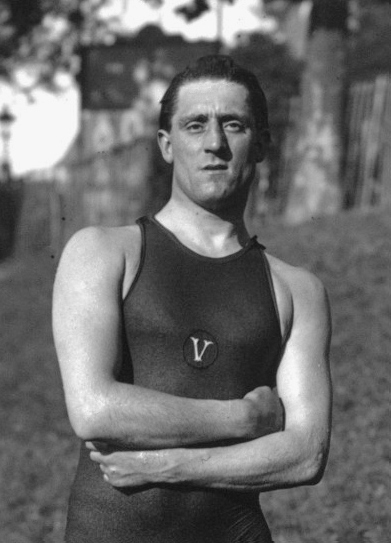
Paul Radmilovic, representing Great Britain, won three gold medals in water polo at the 1908, 1912 and 1920 Olympics.

The following table is pre-sorted by number of Olympic gold medals (in descending order), number of Olympic silver medals (in descending order), number of Olympic bronze medals (in descending order), year of receiving the last Olympic gold medal (in ascending order), year of receiving the first Olympic gold medal (in ascending order), name of the player (in ascending order), respectively. Last updated: 31 March 2021.

Ten athletes won three or more Olympic gold medals in water polo. Six players (Tibor Benedek, Péter Biros, Tamás Kásás, Gergely Kiss, Tamás Molnár and Zoltán Szécsi) were all members of the Hungary men's national water polo team that won three consecutive Olympic gold medals in 2000, 2004 and 2008.

There are thirty-one male athletes who won two Olympic gold medals in water polo.

Legend

- – Hosts

Male athletes who won three or more Olympic gold medals in water polo
Rk	Player	Birth	Height	Men's team	Pos	Water polo tournaments					Period (age of first/last)	Medals				Ref
Rk	Player	Birth	Height	Men's team	Pos	1	2	3	4	5	Period (age of first/last)	G	S	B	T	Ref
1	Dezső Gyarmati	1927	1.86 m (6 ft 1 in)	Hungary	FP	1948	1952	1956	1960	1964	16 years (20/36)	3	1	1	5	
2	György Kárpáti	1935	1.67 m (5 ft 6 in)	Hungary	FP	1952	1956	1960	1964		12 years (17/29)	3	0	1	4	
2	Dušan Mandić	1994	2.02 m (6 ft 8 in)	Serbia	FP	2012	2016	2020	2024		12 years (18/30)	3	0	1	4	
4	Paul Radmilovic	1886	1.80 m (5 ft 11 in)	Great Britain	FP	1908	1912	1920	1924	1928	20 years (22/42)	3	0	0	3	
4	Charles Smith	1879	1.86 m (6 ft 1 in)	Great Britain	GK	1908	1912	1920	1924		16 years (29/45)	3	0	0	3	
4	Tibor Benedek	1972	1.90 m (6 ft 3 in)	Hungary	FP	1992	1996	2000	2004	2008	16 years (20/36)	3	0	0	3	
4	Péter Biros	1976	1.96 m (6 ft 5 in)	Hungary	FP	2000	2004	2008	2012		12 years (24/36)	3	0	0	3	
4	Tamás Kásás	1976	2.00 m (6 ft 7 in)	Hungary	FP	1996	2000	2004	2008	2012	16 years (20/36)	3	0	0	3	
4	Gergely Kiss	1977	1.98 m (6 ft 6 in)	Hungary	FP	2000	2004	2008	2012		12 years (22/34)	3	0	0	3	
4	Tamás Molnár	1975	1.93 m (6 ft 4 in)	Hungary	FP	2000	2004	2008			8 years (25/33)	3	0	0	3	
4	Zoltán Szécsi	1977	1.98 m (6 ft 6 in)	Hungary	GK	2000	2004	2008	2012		12 years (22/34)	3	0	0	3	
4	Nikola Jakšić	1997	1.96 m (6 ft 5 in)	Serbia	FP	2016	2020	2024			8 years (19/27)	3	0	0	3	
4	Sava Ranđelović	1993	1.93 m (6 ft 4 in)	Serbia	FP	2016	2020	2024			8 years (23/31)	3	0	0	3	
Rk	Player	Birth	Height	Men's team	Pos	1	2	3	4	5	Period (age of first/last)	G	S	B	T	Ref
Rk	Player	Birth	Height	Men's team	Pos	Water polo tournaments					Period (age of first/last)	Medals				Ref

=== Top goalscorers (one match) ===
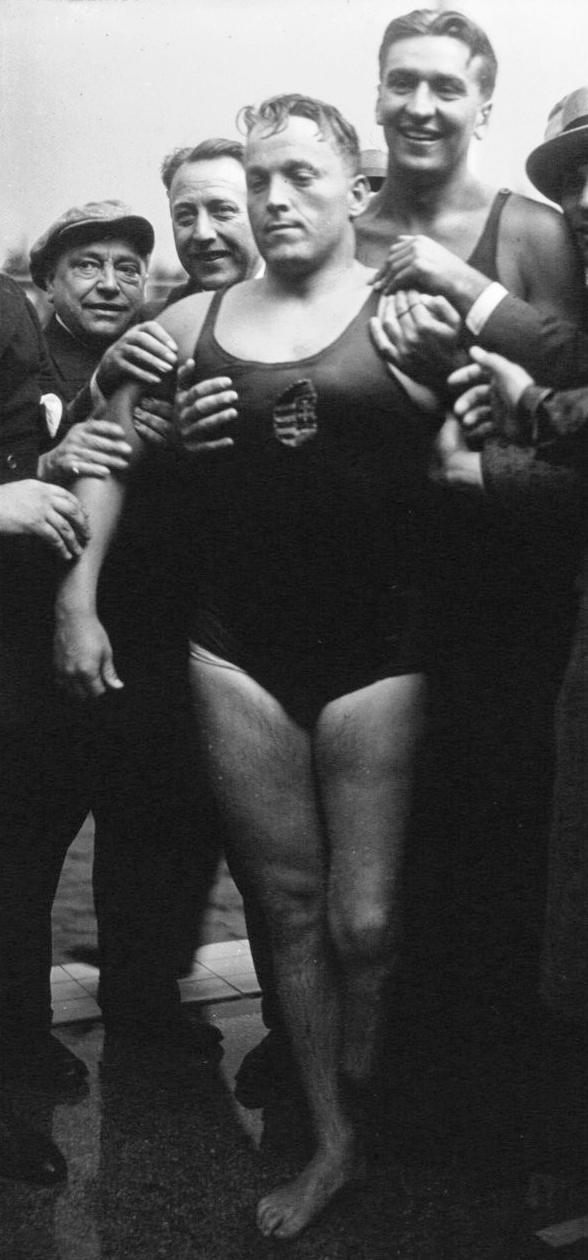
Despite his disability of losing the left leg below the knee, Olivér Halassy of Hungary scored seven goals in a match in 1932.

The following table is pre-sorted by date of the match (in ascending order), name of the player (in ascending order), respectively. Last updated: 4 August 2021.

Scoring seven or more goals in a water polo match is a great feat, as it has only been accomplished 12 times, by 12 players, in the history of men's Olympic tournament.

The first two Olympians to do so were Olivér Halassy and János Németh, with Hungary men's national team in Los Angeles on 8 August 1932. Halassy lost his left leg below the knee when he was a boy. He is the first and only amputee athlete to compete in water polo at the Summer Olympics.

The most recent player to do so was Krisztián Manhercz, with Hungary men's national team in Tokyo on 4 August 2021.

Four players have each netted nine goals in an Olympic match. Hungarian center forward János Németh is the first water polo player to achieve this feat. On 22 October 1968, Zoran Janković of Yugoslavia became the second player to do so. And Manuel Estiarte of Spain is the third player. At the 2008 Games, Aleksandar Šapić of Serbia became the first player to score nine goals in an Olympic match in the 21st century.

At the 1968 Summer Olympics, László Felkai netted seven goals in the bronze medal match on 26 October 1968, helping the Hungarian team win the match. A few hours later, Yugoslavia won the gold medal match over the Soviet Union after extra time, 13–11, despite seven goals scored by Aleksei Barkalov.

Legend and abbreviation

- – Player's team drew the match
- – Player's team lost the match
- Team – Host team
- Player^{‡} – Player who won the tournament with his team
- G – Goals
- aet – After extra time
- pso – Penalty shootout

Male players with seven or more goals in an Olympic match
#	G	Player	Birth	Age	Height	L/R	For	Result	Against	Tournament	Round	Date	Ref
1	7	Olivér Halassy^{‡}	1909	23	1.55 m (5 ft 1 in)		Hungary	18–0	Japan	Los Angeles 1932	Round-robin group	8 Aug 1932	
2	9	János Németh^{‡}	1906	26	1.85 m (6 ft 1 in)		Hungary	18–0	Japan	Los Angeles 1932	Round-robin group	8 Aug 1932	
3	8	Veit Herrmanns	1946	22	1.86 m (6 ft 1 in)		East Germany	19–2	Egypt	Mexico City 1968	Preliminary round Group B	21 Oct 1968	
4	9	Zoran Janković^{‡}	1940	28	1.78 m (5 ft 10 in)		Yugoslavia	17–2	Japan	Mexico City 1968	Preliminary round Group B	22 Oct 1968	
5	7	László Felkai	1941	27	1.80 m (5 ft 11 in)		Hungary	9–4	Italy	Mexico City 1968	Bronze medal match	26 Oct 1968	
6	7	Aleksei Barkalov	1946	22	1.80 m (5 ft 11 in)		Soviet Union	11–11; 11–13 (aet)	Yugoslavia	Mexico City 1968	Gold medal match	26 Oct 1968	
7	9	Manuel Estiarte	1961	22	1.78 m (5 ft 10 in)	Right	Spain	19–12	Brazil	Los Angeles 1984	Preliminary round Group B	1 Aug 1984	
8	8	Pierre Garsau	1961	26	1.86 m (6 ft 1 in)		France	11–4	China	Seoul 1988	Classification round 9th–12th place	30 Sep 1988	
9	7	Ivan Zaitsev	1975	29	1.86 m (6 ft 1 in)	Right	Kazakhstan	15–7	Egypt	Athens 2004	11th–12th place match	27 Aug 2004	
10	9	Aleksandar Šapić	1978	30	1.88 m (6 ft 2 in)	Right	Serbia	15–5	China	Beijing 2008	Preliminary round Group B	16 Aug 2008	
11	7	Felipe Perrone	1986	22	1.83 m (6 ft 0 in)	Right	Spain	10–6	Greece	Beijing 2008	Preliminary round Group A	18 Aug 2008	
12	7	Krisztián Manhercz	1997	24	1.91 m (6 ft 3 in)	Right	Hungary	15–11	Croatia	Tokyo 2020	Quarter-finals	4 Aug 2021	
#	G	Player	Birth	Age	Height	L/R	For	Result	Against	Tournament	Round	Date	Ref

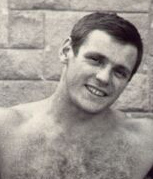
Zoran Janković of Yugoslavia scored nine goals in a match in 1968.

The following table shows the historical progression of the record of goals scored by a male water polo player in a single Olympic match. Last updated: 1 April 2021.

Legend

- Team – Host team
- Player^{‡} – Player who won the tournament with his team

Historical progression of records: Most goals scored by a male player, one match
Goals	Achievement	Year	Player	Age	Height	| L/R	Men's team	Date	Duration of record	Ref
6	Set record	1900	John Jarvis^{‡}	28			Great Britain	11 August 1900	31 years, 363 days	
6	Tied record	1908	Fernand Feyaerts	27–28			Belgium	15 July 1908	31 years, 363 days	
6	Tied record	1928	Koos Köhler	22			Netherlands	5 August 1928	31 years, 363 days	
6	Tied record	1928	Herbert Topp	28			United States	8 August 1928	31 years, 363 days	
6	Tied record	1932	Philip Daubenspeck	26			United States	6 August 1932	31 years, 363 days	
9	Broke record	1932	János Németh^{‡}	26	1.85 m (6 ft 1 in)		Hungary	8 August 1932	94 years, 6 days	
9	Tied record	1968	Zoran Janković^{‡}	28	1.78 m (5 ft 10 in)		Yugoslavia	22 October 1968	94 years, 6 days	
9	Tied record	1984	Manuel Estiarte	22	1.78 m (5 ft 10 in)	Right	Spain	1 August 1984	94 years, 6 days	
9	Tied record	2008	Aleksandar Šapić	30	1.88 m (6 ft 2 in)	Right	Serbia	16 August 2008	94 years, 6 days	
Goals	Achievement	Year	Player	Age	Height	L/R	Men's team	Date	Duration of record	Ref

=== Top goalscorers (one tournament) ===
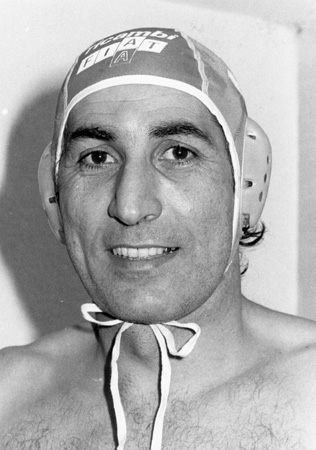
Eraldo Pizzo of Italy scored 29 goals at the 1968 Olympics.

The following table is pre-sorted by number of goals (in descending order), edition of the Olympics (in ascending order), number of matches played (in ascending order), name of the player (in ascending order), respectively. Last updated: 1 April 2021.

Five male players have scored 25 or more goals in an Olympic water polo tournament.

Spaniard Manuel Estiarte is the first and only water polo player to achieve this feat twice. At the 1984 Summer Olympics, Estiarte netted 34 goals, setting the record for the most goals scored by a water polo player in a single Olympic tournament. Four years later, he scored 27 goals in Seoul.

The most recent player to scoring 25 or more goals in a tournament was Alessandro Calcaterra, with Italy men's national team at the 2008 Beijing Olympics.

Legend

- Team – Host team
- Player^{‡} – Player who won the tournament with his team

Male players with 25 or more goals in an Olympic tournament
Rk	Year	Player	Birth	Age	Height	L/R	Goals	Matches played	Goals per match	Men's team	Finish	Ref
1	1984	Manuel Estiarte	1961	22	1.78 m (5 ft 10 in)	Right	34	7	4.857	Spain	4th of 12 teams	
2	1968	Nico van der Voet	1944	24	1.86 m (6 ft 1 in)		33	9	3.667	Netherlands	7th of 15 teams	
3	1968	Eraldo Pizzo	1938	30	1.87 m (6 ft 2 in)	Right	29	9	3.222	Italy	4th of 15 teams	
4	1988	Manuel Estiarte (2)	1961	26	1.78 m (5 ft 10 in)	Right	27	7	3.857	Spain	6th of 12 teams	
4	2008	Alessandro Calcaterra	1975	33	1.87 m (6 ft 2 in)	Right	27	8	3.375	Italy	9th of 12 teams	
6	1968	Rubén Junco	1950	18	1.54 m (5 ft 1 in)		26	8	3.250	Cuba	8th of 15 teams	
Rk	Year	Player	Birth	Age	Height	L/R	Goals	Matches played	Goals per match	Men's team	Finish	Ref

Sources:

- Official Reports (PDF): 1900–1972, 1976 (p. 497), 1980 (p. 510), 1984 (p. 534), 1988–1996;
- Official Results Books (PDF): 2000 (pp. 45–92), 2004 (p. 184), 2008 (p. 179), 2012 (p. 466), 2016 (p. 100);
- Olympedia: 1900–2016 (men's tournaments);
- Sports Reference: 1900–2016 (men's tournaments).

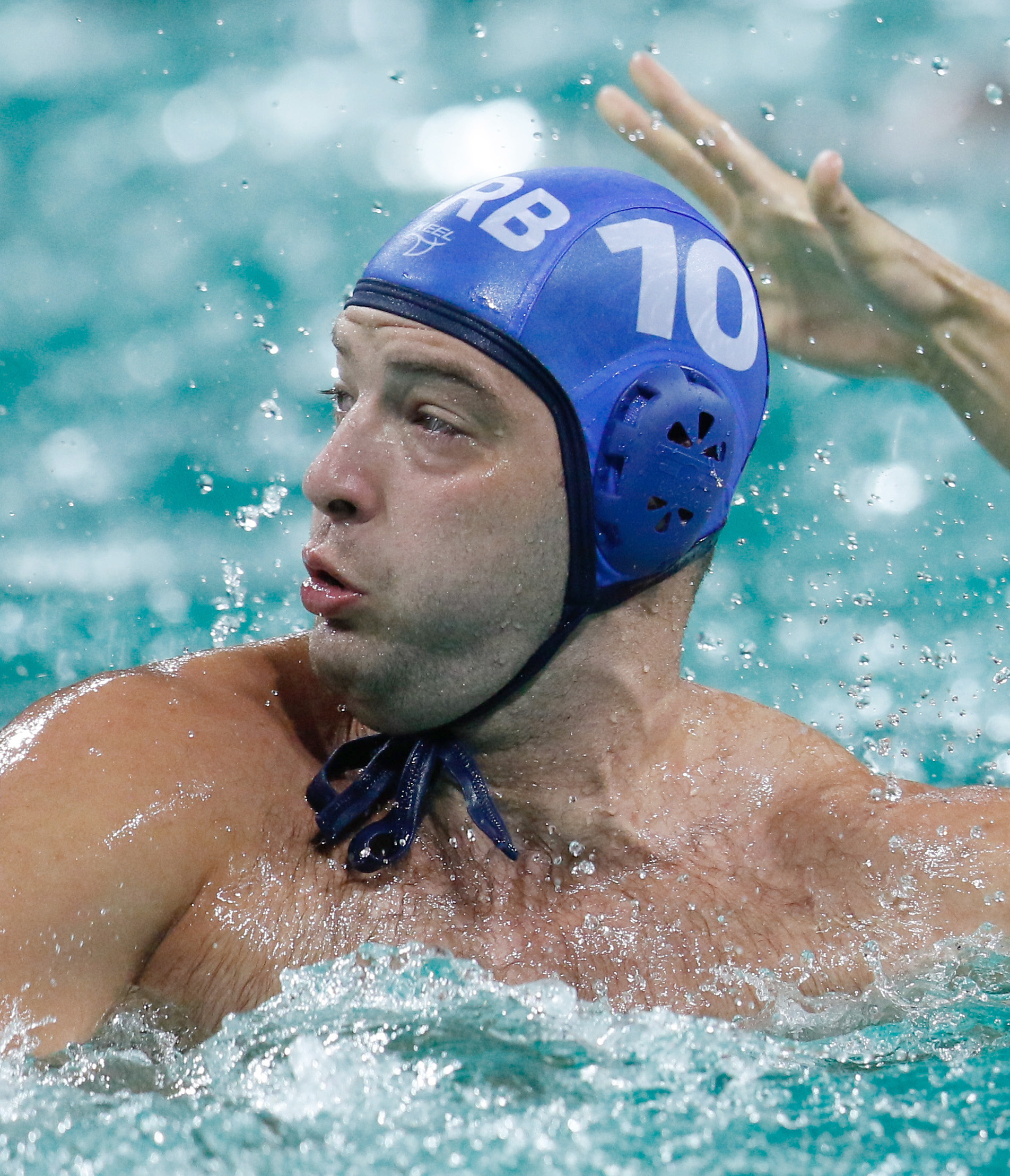
Filip Filipović scored 19 goals at the 2016 Olympics, helping Serbia win gold. He was named the Most Valuable Player of the men's water polo tournament.

The following table is pre-sorted by edition of the Olympics (in ascending order), number of matches played (in ascending order), name of the player (in ascending order), respectively. Last updated: 1 April 2021.

Hans Schneider of Germany scored 22 goals at the 1936 Berlin Olympics, which stood as an Olympic water polo record for one Games until 1968, when the Dutch player Nico van der Voet netted 33 goals in Mexico City.

At 18 years old, Manuel Estiarte of Spain made his Olympic debut at the 1980 Moscow Olympics, where he was the youngest-ever male top goalscorer with 21 goals. He was also the top goalscorer at the 1984 Los Angeles Olympics and the 1988 Seoul Olympics, with 34 and 27 goals, respectively. He was the joint top goalscorer at the 1992 Barcelona Olympics with 22 goals.

Hungarian left-handed player Tibor Benedek was the joint top goalscorer at the 1992 Games with 22 goals, and the top goalscorer at the 1996 Atlanta Olympics with 19 goals.

Aleksandar Šapić, representing FR Yugoslavia, was the top goalscorer at the 2000 Sydney Olympics with 18 goals. Four years later, he netted 18 goals for Serbia and Montenegro, becoming the top goalscorer at the 2004 Athens Olympics.

31-year-old István Szívós Sr. scored 16 goals for Hungary at the 1952 Helsinki Olympics, which stood as an age record for the oldest top goalscorer in a single Olympic water polo tournament until 2008, when 33-year-old Alessandro Calcaterra of Italy netted 27 goals in Beijing.

Left-hander Filip Filipović of Serbia was the joint top goalscorer at the 2016 Olympics, with 19 goals. He netted two goals in the gold medal match, helping the Serbian team win the Olympics.

Legend

- Team – Host team
- Player^{‡} – Player who won the tournament with his team

Male players with the most goals in each Olympic tournament
Year	Player	Birth	Age	Height	L/R	Goals	Matches played	Goals per match	Men's team	Finish	Ref
1900	John Jarvis^{‡}	1872	28			6	1	6.000	Great Britain	1st of 7 teams	
1908	Fernand Feyaerts	1880	27–28			8	3	2.667	Belgium	2nd of 4 teams	
1912	Robert Andersson	1886	25			9	4	2.250	Sweden	2nd of 6 teams	
1920	Erik Andersson	1896	24			10	4	2.500	Sweden	3rd of 12 teams	
1924	Pierre Dewin	1894	29–30			14	5	2.800	Belgium	2nd of 13 teams	
1928	Ferenc Keserű	1903	24	1.55 m (5 ft 1 in)		10	4	2.500	Hungary	2nd of 14 teams	
1932	Philip Daubenspeck	1905	26			14	4	3.500	United States	3rd of 5 teams	
1936	Hans Schneider	1909	26			22	7	3.143	Germany	2nd of 16 teams	
1948	Aldo Ghira^{‡}	1920	28			18	7	2.571	Italy	1st of 18 teams	
1952	Ruud van Feggelen	1924	28			16	8	2.000	Netherlands	5th of 21 teams	
1952	István Szívós Sr.^{‡}	1920	31	1.85 m (6 ft 1 in)	Right	16	8	2.000	Hungary	1st of 21 teams	
1956	Petre Mshvenieradze	1929	27	1.86 m (6 ft 1 in)		11	7	1.571	Soviet Union	3rd of 10 teams	
1960	Fred Tisue	1938	21	1.75 m (5 ft 9 in)		12	7	1.714	United States	7th of 16 teams	
1960	Aurel Zahan	1938	22	1.83 m (6 ft 0 in)		12	7	1.714	Romania	5th of 16 teams	
1964	Nico van der Voet	1944	20	1.86 m (6 ft 1 in)		10	7	1.429	Netherlands	8ht of 13 teams	
1968	Nico van der Voet (2)	1944	24	1.86 m (6 ft 1 in)		33	9	3.667	Netherlands	7th of 15 teams	
1972	Carlos Sánchez	1952	20	1.71 m (5 ft 7 in)		18	9	2.000	Cuba	9th of 16 teams	
1976	Tamás Faragó^{‡}	1952	23	1.94 m (6 ft 4 in)	Right	22	8	2.750	Hungary	1st of 12 teams	
1980	Manuel Estiarte	1961	18	1.78 m (5 ft 10 in)	Right	21	8	2.625	Spain	4th of 12 teams	
1984	Manuel Estiarte (2)	1961	22	1.78 m (5 ft 10 in)	Right	34	7	4.857	Spain	4th of 12 teams	
1988	Manuel Estiarte (3)	1961	26	1.78 m (5 ft 10 in)	Right	27	7	3.857	Spain	6th of 12 teams	
1992	Tibor Benedek	1972	20	1.90 m (6 ft 3 in)	Left	22	7	3.143	Hungary	6th of 12 teams	
1992	Manuel Estiarte (4)	1961	30	1.78 m (5 ft 10 in)	Right	22	7	3.143	Spain	2nd of 12 teams	
1996	Tibor Benedek (2)	1972	24	1.90 m (6 ft 3 in)	Left	19	8	2.375	Hungary	4th of 12 teams	
2000	Aleksandar Šapić	1978	22	1.88 m (6 ft 2 in)	Right	18	8	2.250	Yugoslavia	3rd of 12 teams	
2004	Aleksandar Šapić (2)	1978	26	1.88 m (6 ft 2 in)	Right	18	8	2.250	Serbia and Montenegro	2nd of 12 teams	
2008	Alessandro Calcaterra	1975	33	1.87 m (6 ft 2 in)	Right	27	8	3.375	Italy	9th of 12 teams	
2012	Andrija Prlainović	1987	25	1.87 m (6 ft 2 in)	Right	22	8	2.750	Serbia	3rd of 12 teams	
2016	Filip Filipović^{‡}	1987	29	1.96 m (6 ft 5 in)	Left	19	8	2.375	Serbia	1st of 12 teams	
2016	Guillermo Molina	1984	32	1.95 m (6 ft 5 in)	Right	19	8	2.375	Spain	7th of 12 teams	
Year	Player	Birth	Age	Height	L/R	Goals	Matches played	Goals per match	Men's team	Finish	Ref

Sources:

- Official Reports (PDF): 1900–1972, 1976 (p. 497), 1980 (p. 510), 1984 (p. 534), 1988–1996;
- Official Results Books (PDF): 2000 (pp. 45–92), 2004 (p. 184), 2008 (p. 179), 2012 (p. 466), 2016 (p. 100);
- Olympedia: 1900–2016 (men's tournaments);
- Sports Reference: 1900–2016 (men's tournaments).

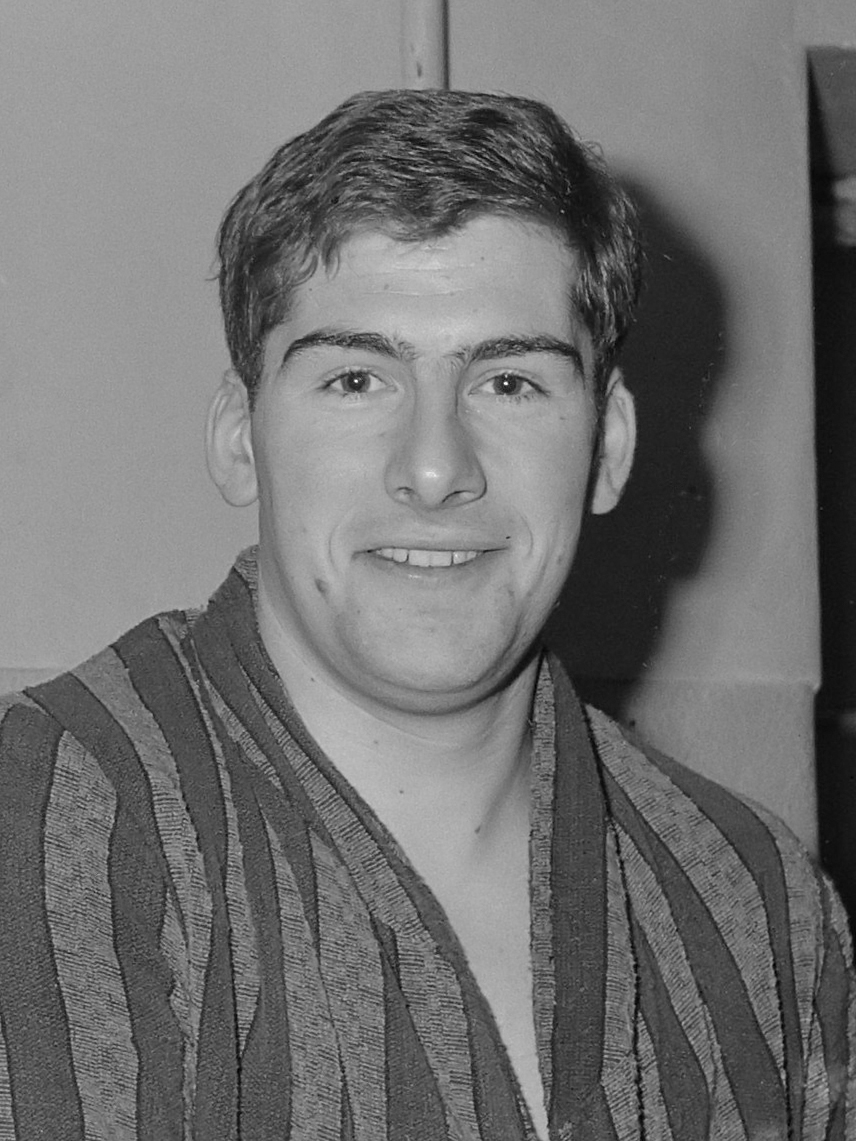
Nico van der Voet of the Netherlands scored 33 goals at the 1968 Olympics.

The following table shows the historical progression of the record of goals scored by a male water polo player in a single Olympic tournament. Last updated: 1 April 2021.

Legend

- Team – Host team
- Player^{‡} – Player who won the tournament with his team

Historical progression of records: Most goals scored by a male player, one tournament
Goals	Achievement	Year	Player	Age	Height	L/R	Men's team	Date	Duration of record	Ref
6	Set record	1900	John Jarvis^{‡}	28			Great Britain	12 August 1900	7 years, 345 days	
8	Broke record	1908	Fernand Feyaerts	27–28			Belgium	22 July 1908	3 years, 360 days	
9	Broke record	1912	Robert Andersson	25			Sweden	16 July 1912	8 years, 44 days	
10	Broke record	1920	Erik Andersson	24			Sweden	29 August 1920	3 years, 326 days	
14	Broke record	1924	Pierre Dewin	29–30			Belgium	20 July 1924	12 years, 26 days	
14	Tied record	1932	Philip Daubenspeck	26			United States	13 August 1932	12 years, 26 days	
22	Broke record	1936	Hans Schneider	26			Germany	15 August 1936	32 years, 72 days	
33	Broke record	1968	Nico van der Voet	24	1.86 m (6 ft 1 in)		Netherlands	26 October 1968	15 years, 289 days	
34	Broke record	1984	Manuel Estiarte	22	1.78 m (5 ft 10 in)	Right	Spain	10 August 1984	42 years, 4 days	
Goals	Achievement	Year	Player	Age	Height	L/R	Men's team	Date	Duration of record	Ref

=== Top goalscorers (all-time) ===
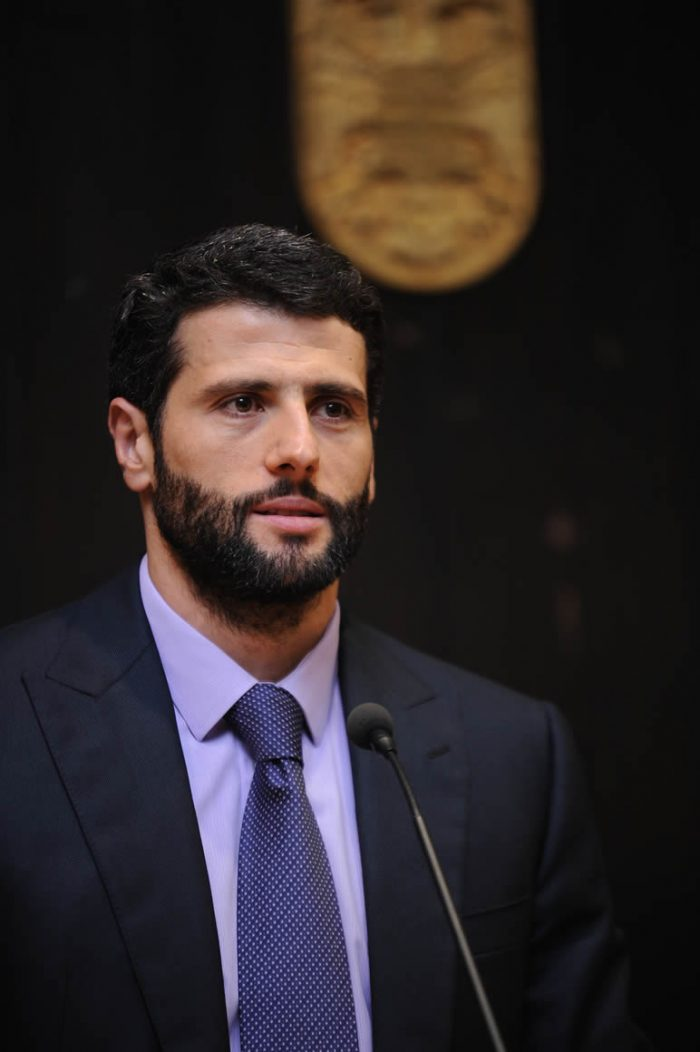
Aleksandar Šapić scored 64 goals at four Olympics (1996–2008).

The following table is pre-sorted by number of total goals (in descending order), number of total Olympic matches played (in ascending order), date of the last Olympic match played (in ascending order), date of the first Olympic match played (in ascending order), name of the player (in ascending order), respectively. Last updated: 1 April 2021.

Six-time Olympian Manuel Estiarte holds the record for the most goals scored by a water polo player in Olympic history, with 127 goals, far more than any other player. At his first three Olympics (1980–1988), Estiarte netted 82 goals.

Hungarian left-hander Tibor Benedek scored 65 goals at five Olympics (1992–2008), and his teammate Tamás Kásás netted 56 goals between 1996 and 2012.

Aleksandar Šapić, representing FR Yugoslavia in 1996 and 2000, Serbia and Montenegro in 2004, and Serbia in 2008, scored 64 goals in 32 matches.

Tony Azevedo of the United States holds the record for the most goals scored by a non-European water polo player in Olympic history, with 61 goals at five Olympics (2000–2016).

Gianni De Magistris is the top scorer for the Italy men's Olympic water polo team, with 59 goals (1968–1984). His compatriot Eraldo Pizzo netted 53 goals at four Olympics between 1960 and 1972.

Charles Turner, representing Australia between 1976 and 1984, scored 50 goals in 23 matches.

Legend

- – Hosts

All-time male players with 50 or more goals at the Olympics
Rk	Player	Birth	Height	L/R	Men's team	Total goals	Total matches played	Goals per match	Tournaments (goals)						Period (age of first/last)	Medals				Ref
Rk	Player	Birth	Height	L/R	Men's team	Total goals	Total matches played	Goals per match	1	2	3	4	5	6	Period (age of first/last)	G	S	B	T	Ref
1	Manuel Estiarte	1961	1.78 m (5 ft 10 in)	Right	Spain	127	45	2.822	1980 (21)	1984 (34)	1988 (27)	1992 (22)	1996 (13)	2000 (10)	20 years (18/38)	1	1	0	2	
2	Tibor Benedek	1972	1.90 m (6 ft 3 in)	Left	Hungary	65	37	1.757	1992 (22)	1996 (19)	2000 (9)	2004 (5)	2008 (10)		16 years (20/36)	3	0	0	3	
3	Aleksandar Šapić	1978	1.88 m (6 ft 2 in)	Right	Yugoslavia	64	32	2.000	1996 (8)	2000 (18)					12 years (18/30)	0	1	2	3	
3	Aleksandar Šapić	1978	1.88 m (6 ft 2 in)	Right	Serbia and Montenegro	64	32	2.000			2004 (18)				12 years (18/30)	0	1	2	3	
3	Aleksandar Šapić	1978	1.88 m (6 ft 2 in)	Right	Serbia	64	32	2.000				2008 (20)			12 years (18/30)	0	1	2	3	
4	Tony Azevedo	1981	1.85 m (6 ft 1 in)	Right	United States	61	35	1.743	2000 (13)	2004 (15)	2008 (17)	2012 (11)	2016 (5)		16 years (18/34)	0	1	0	1	
5	Gianni De Magistris	1950	1.85 m (6 ft 1 in)	Right	Italy	59	40	1.475	1968 (6)	1972 (11)	1976 (11)	1980 (20)	1984 (11)		16 years (17/33)	0	1	0	1	
6	Tamás Kásás	1976	2.00 m (6 ft 7 in)	Right	Hungary	56	38	1.474	1996 (13)	2000 (12)	2004 (14)	2008 (8)	2012 (9)		16 years (20/36)	3	0	0	3	
7	Eraldo Pizzo	1938	1.87 m (6 ft 2 in)	Right	Italy	53	29	1.828	1960 (7)	1964 (5)	1968 (29)	1972 (12)			12 years (22/34)	1	0	0	1	
8	Charles Turner	1952	1.86 m (6 ft 1 in)	Right	Australia	50	23	2.174	1976 (15)	1980 (17)	1984 (18)				8 years (23/31)	0	0	0	0	

Sources:

- Official Reports (PDF): 1900–1972, 1976 (p. 497), 1980 (p. 510), 1984 (p. 534), 1988–1996;
- Official Results Books (PDF): 2000 (pp. 45–92), 2004 (p. 184), 2008 (p. 179), 2012 (p. 466), 2016 (p. 100);
- Olympedia: 1900–2016 (men's tournaments);
- Sports Reference: 1900–2016 (men's tournaments).

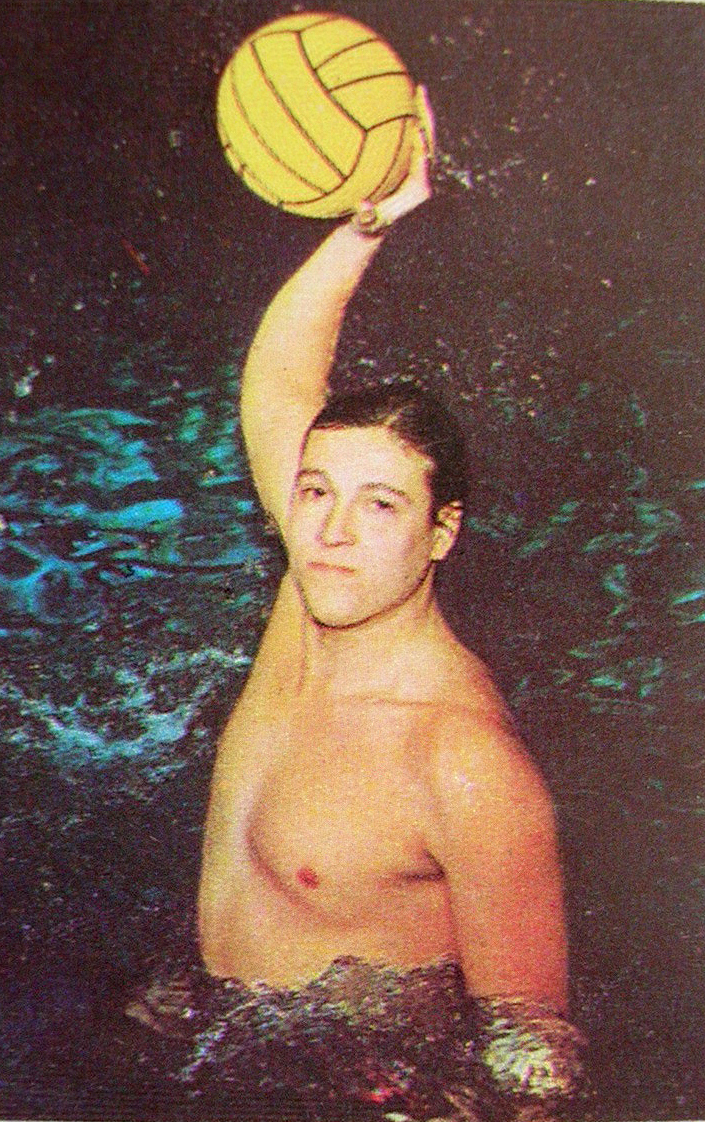
Gianni De Magistris of Italy scored 59 goals at five Olympics (1968–1984).

The following table shows the historical progression of the record of total goals scored by a male water polo player at the Summer Olympics. Last updated: 1 April 2021.

Legend

- Team – Host team
- Player^{‡} – Player who won the tournament with his team

Historical progression of records: Most goals scored by a male player, all-time
Total goals	Achievement	Year	Player	Age	Height	L/R	Men's team	Date	Duration of record	Ref
32	Set record	1936	János Németh^{‡}	30	1.85 m (6 ft 1 in)		Hungary	15 August 1936	32 years, 72 days	
32	Tied record	1952	Ruud van Feggelen	28			Netherlands	2 August 1952	32 years, 72 days	
43	Broke record	1968	Nico van der Voet	24	1.86 m (6 ft 1 in)		Netherlands	26 October 1968	3 years, 314 days	
53	Broke record	1972	Eraldo Pizzo	34	1.87 m (6 ft 2 in)	Right	Italy	4 September 1972	11 years, 341 days	
59	Broke record	1984	Gianni De Magistris	33	1.85 m (6 ft 1 in)	Right	Italy	10 August 1984	4 years, 52 days	
82	Broke record	1988	Manuel Estiarte	26	1.78 m (5 ft 10 in)	Right	Spain	1 October 1988	3 years, 313 days	
104	Broke record	1992	Manuel Estiarte (2)	30	1.78 m (5 ft 10 in)	Right	Spain	9 August 1992	3 years, 354 days	
117	Broke record	1996	Manuel Estiarte^{‡} (3)	34	1.78 m (5 ft 10 in)	Right	Spain	28 July 1996	4 years, 65 days	
127	Broke record	2000	Manuel Estiarte (4)	38	1.78 m (5 ft 10 in)	Right	Spain	1 October 2000	25 years, 317 days	
Total goals	Achievement	Year	Player	Age	Height	L/R	Men's team	Date	Duration of record	Ref

=== Top goalkeepers (one match) ===
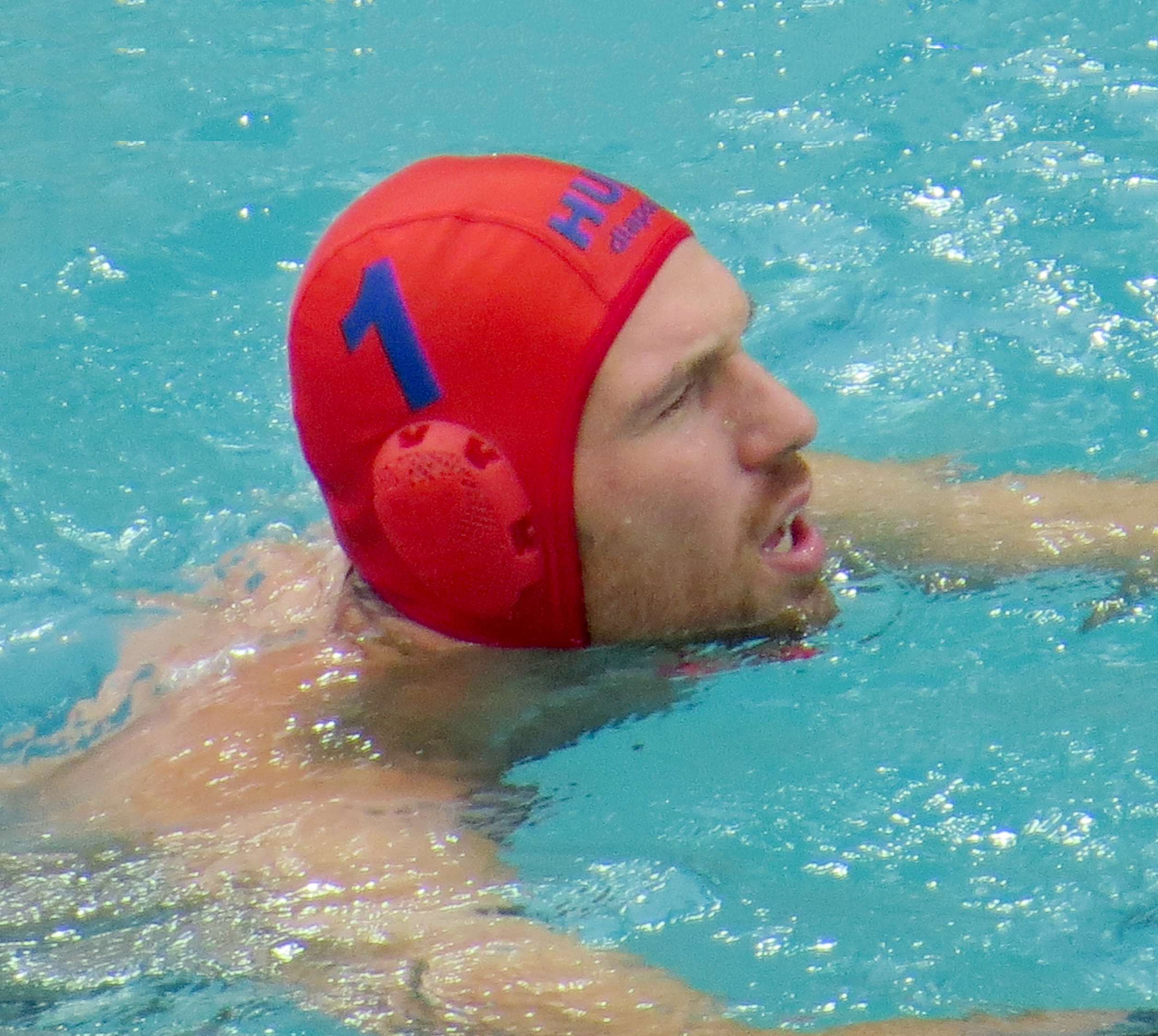
Hungarian Viktor Nagy saved 16 shots in a match in 2016.

The following table is pre-sorted by date of the match (in ascending order), name of the goalkeeper (in ascending order), respectively. Last updated: 1 April 2021.

Since 1996, nine male water polo goalkeepers have each saved sixteen or more shots in an Olympic match.

The first man to do so was Christopher Duplanty, with the United States men's national team in Atlanta. He blocked 20 shots on 24 July 1996, setting the record for the most shots saved by a water polo goalkeeper in a single Olympic match.

The most recent goalkeeper to do so was Viktor Nagy, with Hungary men's national team in Rio de Janeiro on 18 August 2016.

Italian Stefano Tempesti is the only water polo goalkeeper to achieve this feat twice.

Legend and abbreviation

- – Player's team drew the match
- – Player's team lost the match
- Team – Host team
- Player^{‡} – Player who won the tournament with his team
- aet – After extra time
- pso – Penalty shootout
- OR – Official Reports
- ORB – Official Results Books

Male goalkeepers with sixteen or more saves in an Olympic match (statistics since 1996)
#	Saves	Goalkeeper	Birth	Age	Height	For	Result	Against	Tournament	Round	Date	Ref
1	20	Christopher Duplanty	1965	30	1.90 m (6 ft 3 in)	United States	10–8	Croatia	Atlanta 1996	Preliminary round Group B	24 Jul 1996	OR 1996 (p. 66)
2	16	Siniša Školneković	1968	28	1.94 m (6 ft 4 in)	Croatia	4–4; 7–6 (aet)	Italy	Atlanta 1996	Semi-finals	27 Jul 1996	OR 1996 (p. 72)
3	17	Nikolay Maksimov	1972	27	1.90 m (6 ft 3 in)	Russia	6–4	Australia	Sydney 2000	Preliminary round Group A	23 Sep 2000	ORB 2000 (p. 66)
4	19	Stefano Tempesti	1979	29	2.05 m (6 ft 9 in)	Italy	10–10; 13–13 (aet); 3–4 (pso)	Australia	Beijing 2008	Classification round 7th–10th place	22 Aug 2008	ORB 2008 (p. 152)
5	16	Merrill Moses	1977	31	1.91 m (6 ft 3 in)	United States	10–5	Serbia	Beijing 2008	Semi-finals	22 Aug 2008	ORB 2008 (p. 158)
6	17	Stefano Tempesti (2)	1979	33	2.05 m (6 ft 9 in)	Italy	8–5	Australia	London 2012	Preliminary round Group A	29 Jul 2012	ORB 2012 (p. 377)
7	17	Dragoș Stoenescu	1979	33	1.96 m (6 ft 5 in)	Romania	13–4	Great Britain	London 2012	Preliminary round Group B	29 Jul 2012	ORB 2012 (p. 381)
8	16	Iñaki Aguilar	1983	28	1.89 m (6 ft 2 in)	Spain	11–9	Greece	London 2012	Preliminary round Group A	4 Aug 2012	ORB 2012 (p. 417)
9	16	Viktor Nagy	1984	32	1.98 m (6 ft 6 in)	Hungary	13–4	Brazil	Rio 2016	Classification round 5th–8th place	18 Aug 2016	ORB 2016 (p. 77)
#	Saves	Goalkeeper	Birth	Age	Height	For	Result	Against	Tournament	Round	Date	Ref

The following table shows the historical progression of the record of shots saved by a male water polo goalkeeper in a single Olympic match since 1996. Last updated: 1 April 2021.

Legend

- Team – Host team
- Player^{‡} – Player who won the tournament with his team
- OR – Official Reports
- ORB – Official Results Books

Historical progression of records: Most shots saved by a male goalkeeper, one match (statistics since 1996)
Saves	Achievement	Year	Goalkeeper	Age	Height	Men's team	Date	Duration of record	Ref
20	Set record	1996	Christopher Duplanty	30	1.90 m (6 ft 3 in)	United States	24 July 1996	30 years, 21 days	OR 1996 (p. 66)

=== Top goalkeepers (one tournament) ===
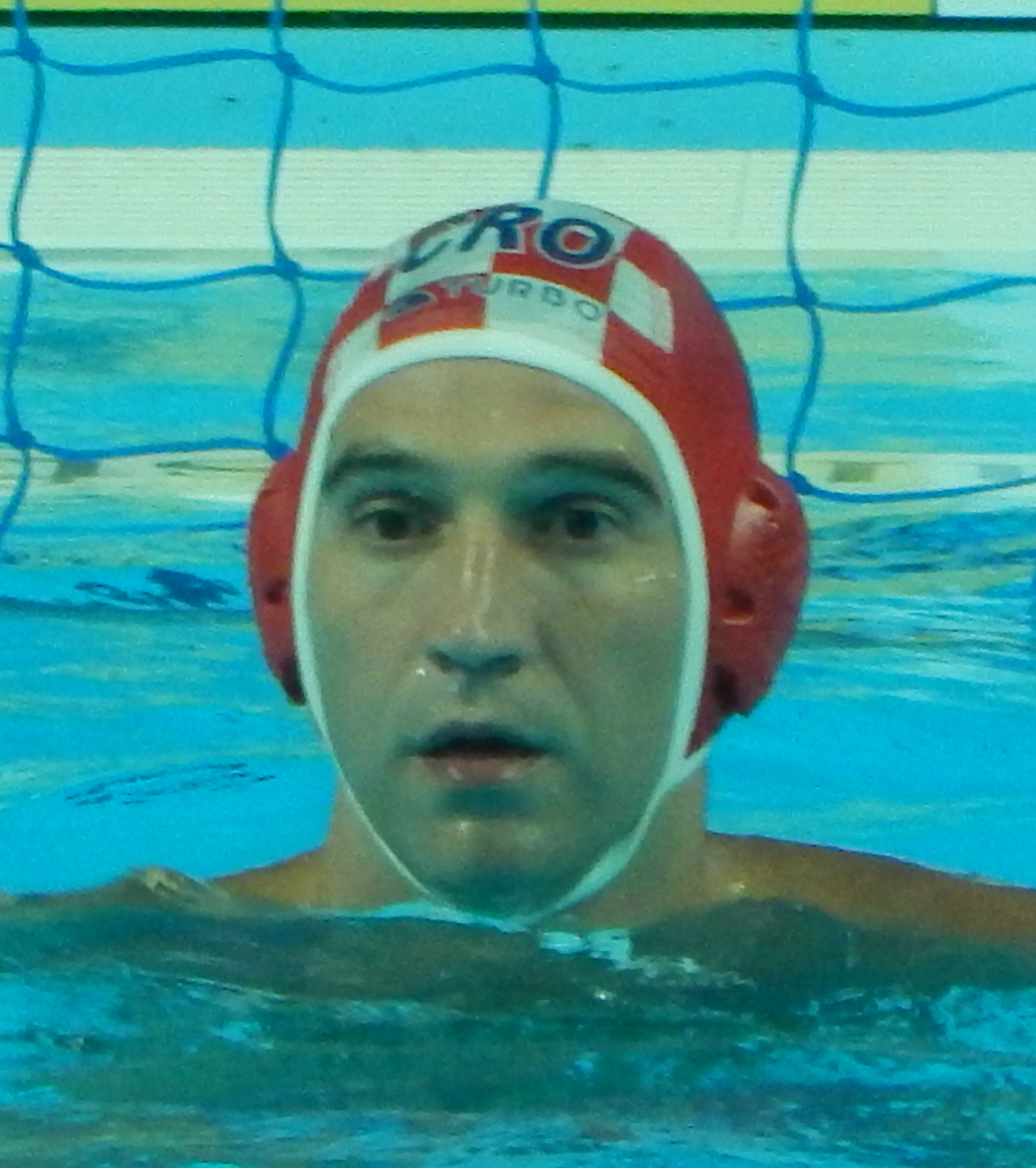
Josip Pavić saved 85 shots at the 2012 Games, helping Croatia win the Olympic title. He was named the Most Valuable Player of the men's water polo tournament.

The following table is pre-sorted by number of saves (in descending order), edition of the Olympics (in ascending order), number of matches played (in ascending order), name of the goalkeeper (in ascending order), respectively. Last updated: 1 April 2021.

Since 1996, six male goalkeepers have saved 75 or more shots in an Olympic water polo tournament.

Stefano Tempesti of Italy is the first water polo goalkeeper to achieve this feat twice. At the 2008 Olympics, Tempesti saved 83 shots. Four years later in London, he blocked 87 shots, setting the record for the most saves by a water polo goalkeeper in a single Olympic tournament.

Slobodan Soro is the second goalkeeper to achieve this feat twice. At the 2012 London Olympics, Soro saved 75 shots for Serbia. In Rio de Janeiro, he saved 81 shots for Brazil.

At the 2012 Summer Games, Josip Pavić saved 85 shots, including nine in the gold medal match, helping the Croatia team win the Olympics. He is the most efficient one among these six goalkeepers.

Legend and abbreviation

- Team – Host team
- Player^{‡} – Player who won the tournament with his team
- MP – Matches played
- Eff % – Save efficiency (Saves / Shots)
- 70.2% – Highest save efficiency

Male goalkeepers with 75 or more saves in an Olympic tournament (statistics since 1996)
Rk	Year	Goalkeeper	Birth	Age	Height	Saves	Shots	Eff %	MP	Saves per match	Men's team	Finish	Ref
1	2012	Stefano Tempesti	1979	33	2.05 m (6 ft 9 in)	87	147	59.2%	8	10.875	Italy	2nd of 12 teams	
2	2012	Josip Pavić^{‡}	1982	30	1.95 m (6 ft 5 in)	85	121	70.2%	8	10.625	Croatia	1st of 12 teams	
3	2008	Stefano Tempesti (2)	1979	29	2.05 m (6 ft 9 in)	83	169	49.1%	8	10.375	Italy	9th of 12 teams	
4	1996	Arie van de Bunt	1969	27	1.85 m (6 ft 1 in)	81	154	52.6%	8	10.125	Netherlands	10th of 12 teams	
4	2016	Slobodan Soro	1978	37	1.96 m (6 ft 5 in)	81	152	53.3%	8	10.125	Brazil	8th of 12 teams	
6	1996	Christopher Duplanty	1965	30	1.90 m (6 ft 3 in)	77	132	58.3%	8	9.625	United States	7th of 12 teams	
6	1996	Siniša Školneković	1968	28	1.94 m (6 ft 4 in)	77	135	57.0%	8	9.625	Croatia	2nd of 12 teams	
8	2012	Slobodan Soro (2)	1978	33	1.96 m (6 ft 5 in)	75	135	55.6%	8	9.375	Serbia	3rd of 12 teams	
Rk	Year	Goalkeeper	Birth	Age	Height	Saves	Shots	Eff %	MP	Saves per match	Men's team	Finish	Ref

Sources:

- Official Reports (PDF): 1996 (pp. 56–73);
- Official Results Books (PDF): 2000 (pp. 45–92), 2004 (p. 180), 2008 (p. 175), 2012 (p. 462), 2016 (p. 102).

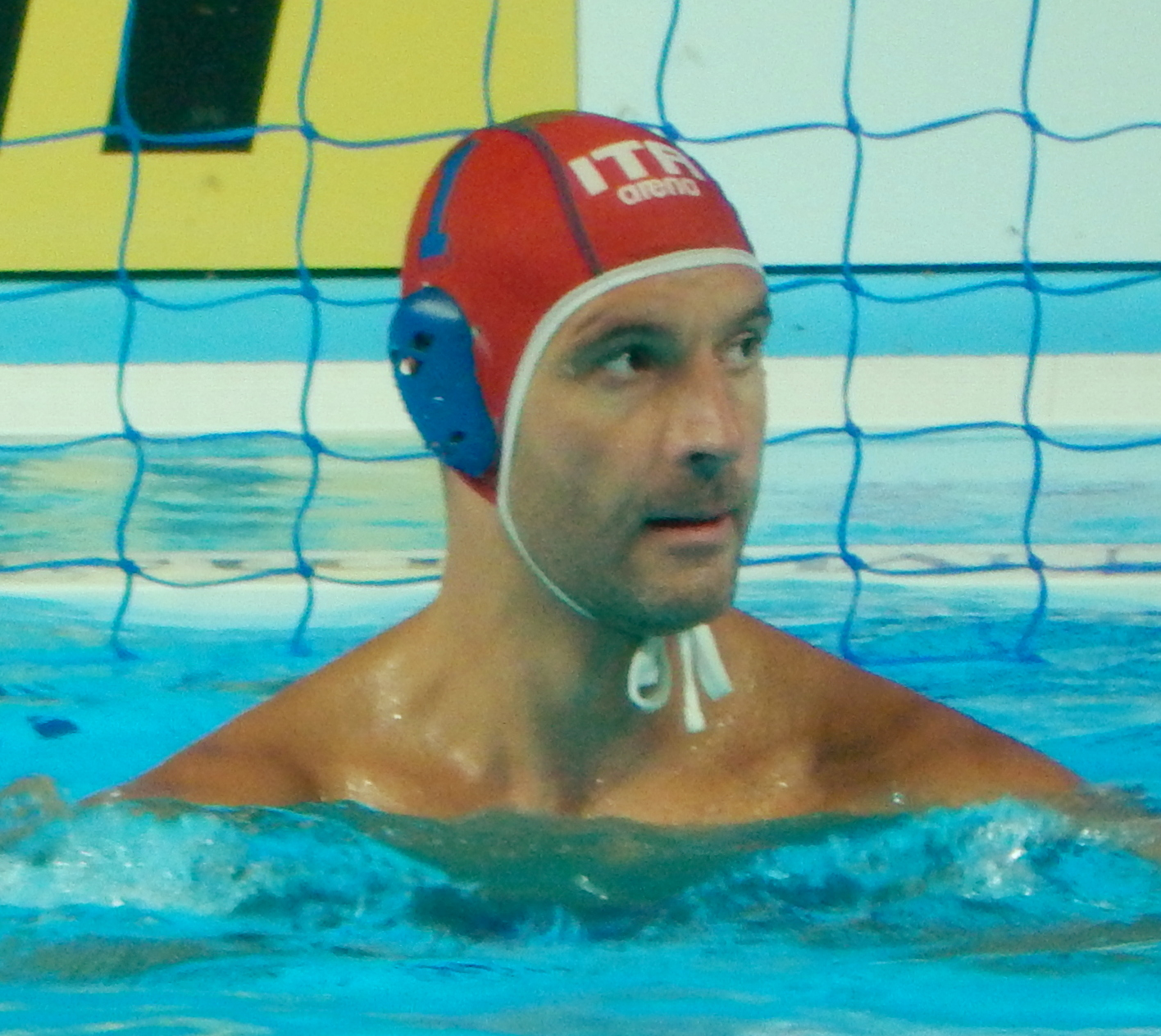
Stefano Tempesti of Italy saved 83 and 87 shots at the 2008 and 2012 Olympics, respectively.

The following table is pre-sorted by edition of the Olympics (in ascending order), number of matches played (in ascending order), name of the goalkeeper (in ascending order), respectively. Last updated: 1 April 2021.

At the 2004 Summer Games, Nikolay Maksimov saved 62 shots, including seven in the bronze medal match, helping Russia win the match.

Stefano Tempesti of Italy blocked 83 shots at the 2008 Olympics. In the 2012 edition, he saved 87 shots, helping the Italian team win the Olympic silver medal.

Slobodan Soro, representing Brazil, saved 81 shots at the 2016 Rio Olympics.

Legend and abbreviation

- Team – Host team
- Player^{‡} – Player who won the tournament with his team
- MP – Matches played
- Eff % – Save efficiency (Saves / Shots)

Male goalkeepers with the most saves in each Olympic tournament (statistics since 1996)
Year	Goalkeeper	Birth	Age	Height	Saves	Shots	Eff %	MP	Saves per match	Men's team	Finish	Ref
1996	Arie van de Bunt	1969	27	1.85 m (6 ft 1 in)	81	154	52.6%	8	10.125	Netherlands	10th of 12 teams	
2000	Dan Hackett	1970	30	1.98 m (6 ft 6 in)	70	135	51.9%	8	8.750	United States	6th of 12 teams	
2004	Nikolay Maksimov	1972	31	1.90 m (6 ft 3 in)	62	104	59.6%	8	7.750	Russia	3rd of 12 teams	
2008	Stefano Tempesti	1979	29	2.05 m (6 ft 9 in)	83	169	49.1%	8	10.375	Italy	9th of 12 teams	
2012	Stefano Tempesti (2)	1979	33	2.05 m (6 ft 9 in)	87	147	59.2%	8	10.875	Italy	2nd of 12 teams	
2016	Slobodan Soro	1978	37	1.96 m (6 ft 5 in)	81	152	53.3%	8	10.125	Brazil	8th of 12 teams	

Sources:

- Official Reports (PDF): 1996 (pp. 56–73);
- Official Results Books (PDF): 2000 (pp. 45–92), 2004 (p. 180), 2008 (p. 175), 2012 (p. 462), 2016 (p. 102).

The following table shows the historical progression of the record of shots saved by a male water polo goalkeeper in a single Olympic tournament since 1996. Last updated: 1 April 2021.

Legend

- Team – Host team
- Player^{‡} – Player who won the tournament with his team

Historical progression of records: Most shots saved by a male goalkeeper, one tournament (statistics since 1996)
Saves	Achievement	Year	Goalkeeper	Age	Height	Men's team	Date	Duration of record	Ref
81	Set record	1996	Arie van de Bunt	27	1.85 m (6 ft 1 in)	Netherlands	28 July 1996	12 years, 27 days	
83	Broke record	2008	Stefano Tempesti	29	2.05 m (6 ft 9 in)	Italy	24 August 2008	3 years, 354 days	
87	Broke record	2012	Stefano Tempesti (2)	33	2.05 m (6 ft 9 in)	Italy	12 August 2012	14 years, 2 days	

=== Top goalkeepers (all-time) ===
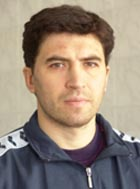
Russian-Kazakhstani goalkeeper Nikolay Maksimov saved 228 shots at four Olympics (1996–2004, 2012).

The following table is pre-sorted by number of total saves (in descending order), number of total Olympic matches played (in ascending order), date of the last Olympic match played (in ascending order), date of the first Olympic match played (in ascending order), name of the goalkeeper (in ascending order), respectively. Last updated: 1 April 2021.

Five-time Olympian Stefano Tempesti holds the record for the most shots saved by a water polo goalkeeper at the Olympics since 1996, with 295 saves.

Nikolay Maksimov, representing Russia, saved 178 shots at three Olympics (1996–2004). Eight years later, he represented Kazakhstan at the 2012 London Olympics, blocking 50 shots.

Slobodan Soro saved 132 shots in 2008 and 2012, representing Serbia. He was a member of the Brazil men's national team that competed at the 2016 Rio Olympics, blocking 81 shots.

Legend

- – Hosts

All-time male goalkeepers with 200 or more saves at the Olympics (statistics since 1996)
Rk	Goalkeeper	Birth	Height	Men's team	Total saves	Total matches played	Saves per match	Tournaments (saves)					Period (age of first/last)	Medals				Ref
Rk	Goalkeeper	Birth	Height	Men's team	Total saves	Total matches played	Saves per match	1	2	3	4	5	Period (age of first/last)	G	S	B	T	Ref
1	Stefano Tempesti	1979	2.05 m (6 ft 9 in)	Italy	295	39	7.564	2000 (24)	2004 (50)	2008 (83)	2012 (87)	2016 (51)	16 years (21/37)	0	1	1	2	
2	Nikolay Maksimov	1972	1.90 m (6 ft 3 in)	Russia	228	29	7.862	1996 (58)	2000 (58)	2004 (62)			16 years (23/39)	0	1	1	2	
2	Nikolay Maksimov	1972	1.90 m (6 ft 3 in)	Kazakhstan	228	29	7.862					2012 (50)	16 years (23/39)	0	1	1	2	
3	Slobodan Soro	1978	1.96 m (6 ft 5 in)	Serbia	213	24	8.875	2008 (57)	2012 (75)				8 years (29/37)	0	0	2	2	
3	Slobodan Soro	1978	1.96 m (6 ft 5 in)	Brazil	213	24	8.875			2016 (81)			8 years (29/37)	0	0	2	2	

Sources:

- Official Reports (PDF): 1996 (pp. 56–73);
- Official Results Books (PDF): 2000 (pp. 45–92), 2004 (p. 180), 2008 (p. 175), 2012 (p. 462), 2016 (p. 102).

The following table shows the historical progression of the record of total shots saved by a male water polo goalkeeper at the Summer Olympics since 1996. Last updated: 1 April 2021.

Legend

- Team – Host team
- Player^{‡} – Player who won the tournament with his team

Historical progression of records: Most shots saved by a male goalkeeper, all-time (statistics since 1996)
Total saves	Achievement	Year	Goalkeeper	Age	Height	Men's team	Date	Duration of record	Ref
146	Set record	2000	Arie van de Bunt	31	1.85 m (6 ft 1 in)	Netherlands	1 October 2000	3 years, 333 days	
178	Broke record	2004	Nikolay Maksimov	31	1.90 m (6 ft 3 in)	Russia	29 August 2004	7 years, 349 days	
244	Broke record	2012	Stefano Tempesti	33	2.05 m (6 ft 9 in)	Italy	12 August 2012	4 years, 8 days	
295	Broke record	2016	Stefano Tempesti (2)	37	2.05 m (6 ft 9 in)	Italy	20 August 2016	9 years, 359 days	

=== Top sprinters (one tournament) ===
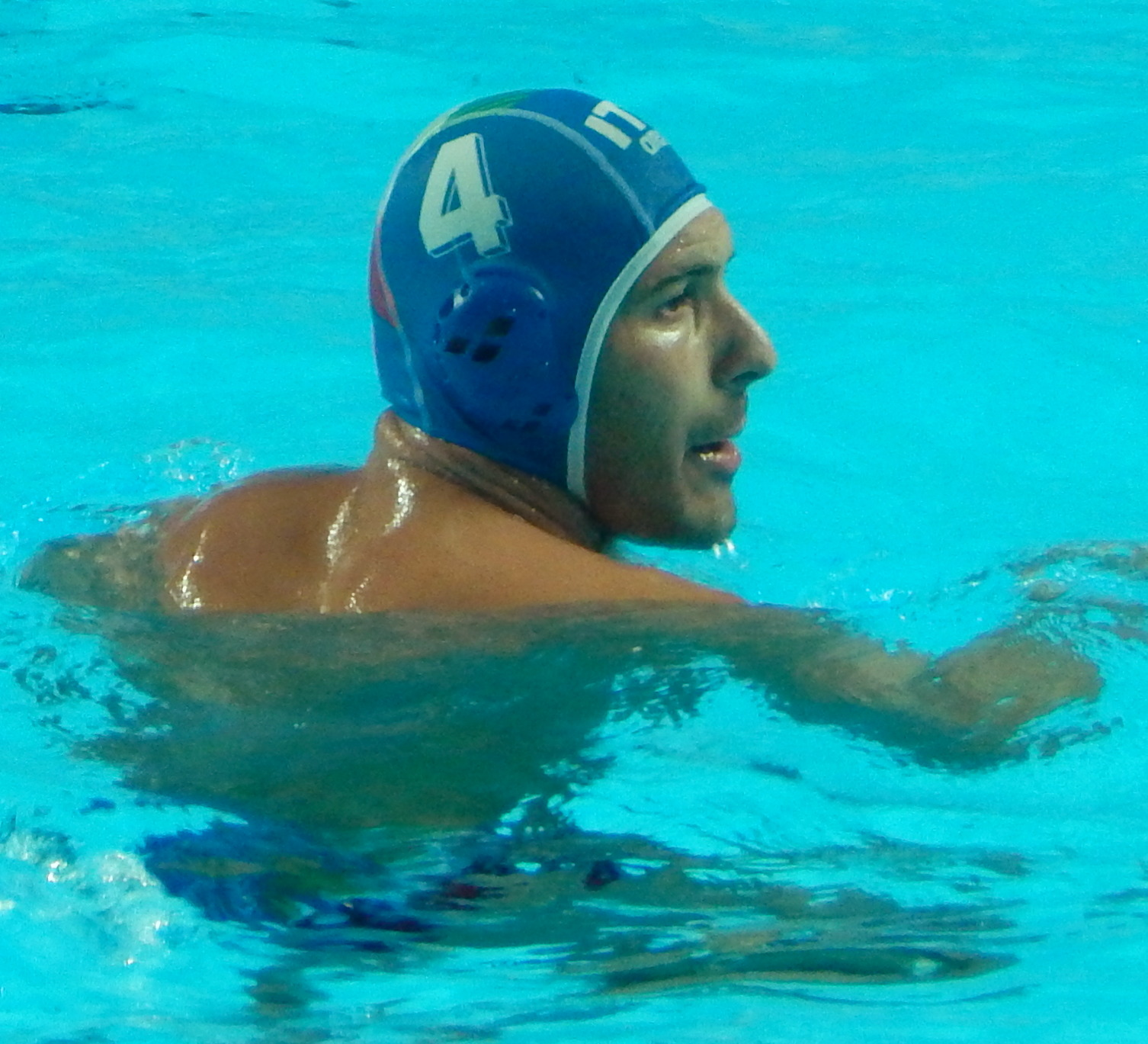
Pietro Figlioli, representing Australia then Italy, was the (joint) top sprinter in 2004, 2008 and 2012.

The following table is pre-sorted by number of sprints won (in descending order), edition of the Olympics (in ascending order), number of sprints contested (in ascending order), name of the player (in ascending order), respectively. Last updated: 15 May 2021.

Sprinters are usually the fastest swimmers of the water polo team. If a water polo player won an Olympic medal in swimming, he would be an outstanding sprinter.

Brad Schumacher is the latest example. He won two gold medals for the United States at the 1996 Atlanta Olympics: in the men's 4×100 meter freestyle relay and men's 4×200 meter freestyle relay. At the 2000 Sydney Olympics, he was the top sprinter of the men's water polo tournament, with 20 sprints won.

Since 2000, three male players have won 20 or more sprints in an Olympic water polo tournament.

Pietro Figlioli is the first and only water polo player to achieve this feat twice. At the 2004 Summer Olympics, Figlioli won 24 sprints for Australia, setting the record for the most sprints won by a water polo player in a single Olympic tournament. Four years later, he won 21 sprints in Beijing.

At the 2004 Athens Olympics, Sergey Garbuzov won 20 sprints, helping Russia win the bronze medal. He is the most efficient one among these three sprinters.

Legend and abbreviation

- Team – Host team
- Player^{‡} – Player who won the tournament with his team
- Eff % – Efficiency (Sprints won / Sprints contested)
- 95.2% – Highest efficiency

Male players with 20 or more sprints won in an Olympic tournament (statistics since 2000)
Rk	Year	Sprinter	Birth	Age	Height	Sprints won	Sprints contested	Eff %	Men's team	Finish	Note	Ref
1	2004	Pietro Figlioli	1984	20	1.91 m (6 ft 3 in)	24	27	88.9%	Australia	9th of 12 teams		
2	2008	Pietro Figlioli (2)	1984	24	1.91 m (6 ft 3 in)	21	23	91.3%	Australia	8th of 12 teams		
3	2000	Brad Schumacher	1974	26	1.93 m (6 ft 4 in)	20	34	58.8%	United States	6th of 12 teams	1996 – Men's 4 × 100 m freestyle relay (gold); 1996 – Men's 4 × 200 m freestyle relay (gold)	
3	2004	Sergey Garbuzov	1974	30	1.92 m (6 ft 4 in)	20	21	95.2%	Russia	3rd of 12 teams		

- Official Results Books (PDF): 2000 (p. 44), 2004 (p. 183), 2008 (p. 178), 2012 (p. 465), 2016 (p. 99).

The following table is pre-sorted by edition of the Olympics (in ascending order), number of sprints contested (in ascending order), name of the player (in ascending order), respectively. Last updated: 15 May 2021.

At the 2000 Olympics, Brad Schumacher won 20 sprints for the United States, becoming the top sprinter of the tournament.

Pietro Figlioli was the top sprinter in 2004 and 2008, representing Australia. He was a member of the Italy men's national team that competed at the 2012 London Olympics. He was the joint top sprinter in 2012.

Rhys Howden of Australia was another joint top sprinter in 2012. He was also the top sprinter at the 2016 Rio Olympics.

Legend and abbreviation

- Team – Host team
- Player^{‡} – Player who won the tournament with his team
- Eff % – Efficiency (Sprints won / Sprints contested)

Male players with the most sprints won in each Olympic tournament (statistics since 2000)
Year	Sprinter	Birth	Age	Height	Sprints won	Sprints contested	Eff %	Men's team	Finish	Note	Ref
2000	Brad Schumacher	1974	26	1.93 m (6 ft 4 in)	20	34	58.8%	United States	6th of 12 teams	1996 – Men's 4 × 100 m freestyle relay (gold); 1996 – Men's 4 × 200 m freestyle relay (gold)	
2004	Pietro Figlioli	1984	20	1.91 m (6 ft 3 in)	24	27	88.9%	Australia	9th of 12 teams		
2008	Pietro Figlioli (2)	1984	24	1.91 m (6 ft 3 in)	21	23	91.3%	Australia	8th of 12 teams		
2012	Pietro Figlioli (3)	1984	28	1.91 m (6 ft 3 in)	19	21	90.5%	Italy	2nd of 12 teams		
2012	Rhys Howden	1987	25	1.89 m (6 ft 2 in)	19	24	79.2%	Australia	7th of 12 teams		
2016	Rhys Howden (2)	1987	29	1.89 m (6 ft 2 in)	18	19	94.7%	Australia	9th of 12 teams		

- Official Results Books (PDF): 2000 (p. 44), 2004 (p. 183), 2008 (p. 178), 2012 (p. 465), 2016 (p. 99).

The following table shows the historical progression of the record of sprints won by a male water polo player in a single Olympic tournament since 2000. Last updated: 15 May 2021.

Legend

- Team – Host team
- Player^{‡} – Player who won the tournament with his team

Historical progression of records: Most sprints won by a male player, one tournament (statistics since 2000)
Sprints won	Achievement	Year	Sprinter	Age	Height	Men's team	Date	Duration of record	Ref
20	Set record	2000	Brad Schumacher	26	1.93 m (6 ft 4 in)	United States	1 October 2000	3 years, 333 days	
24	Broke record	2004	Pietro Figlioli	20	1.91 m (6 ft 3 in)	Australia	29 August 2004	21 years, 350 days	

=== Top sprinters (all-time) ===
The following table is pre-sorted by number of total sprints won (in descending order), number of total sprints contested (in ascending order), year of the last Olympic appearance (in ascending order), year of the first Olympic appearance (in ascending order), name of the player (in ascending order), respectively. Last updated: 15 May 2021.

Pietro Figlioli holds the record for the most sprints won by a water polo player at the Olympics since 2000, with 78 sprints won at four Olympics (2004–2016).

Australian Rhys Howden won 42 sprints in three Olympic tournaments between 2008 and 2016.

Aleksandar Ćirić, representing FR Yugoslavia in 2000, Serbia and Montenegro in 2004, and Serbia in 2008, won 40 sprints at three Olympics.

Legend and abbreviation

- – Hosts
- Eff % – Efficiency (Sprints won / Sprints contested)

All-time male players with 30 or more sprints won at the Olympics (statistics since 2000)
Rk	Sprinter	Birth	Height	Men's team	Total Sprints won	Total Sprints contested	Eff %	Water polo tournaments (sprints won / contested)					Period (age of first/last)	Medals				Ref
Rk	Sprinter	Birth	Height	Men's team	Total Sprints won	Total Sprints contested	Eff %	1	2	3	4	5	Period (age of first/last)	G	S	B	T	Ref
1	Pietro Figlioli	1984	1.91 m (6 ft 3 in)	Australia	78	86	90.7%	2004 (24/27)	2008 (21/23)				12 years (20/32)	0	1	1	2	
1	Pietro Figlioli	1984	1.91 m (6 ft 3 in)	Italy	78	86	90.7%			2012 (19/21)	2016 (14/15)		12 years (20/32)	0	1	1	2	
2	Rhys Howden	1987	1.89 m (6 ft 2 in)	Australia	42	49	85.7%	2008 (5/6)	2012 (19/24)	2016 (18/19)			8 years (21/29)	0	0	0	0	
3	Aleksandar Ćirić	1977	1.92 m (6 ft 4 in)	Yugoslavia	40	56	71.4%	2000 (17/24)					8 years (22/30)	0	1	2	3	
3	Aleksandar Ćirić	1977	1.92 m (6 ft 4 in)	Serbia and Montenegro	40	56	71.4%		2004 (14/20)				8 years (22/30)	0	1	2	3	
3	Aleksandar Ćirić	1977	1.92 m (6 ft 4 in)	Serbia	40	56	71.4%			2008 (9/12)			8 years (22/30)	0	1	2	3	
4	Tamás Kásás	1976	2.00 m (6 ft 7 in)	Hungary	39	59	66.1%	1996 (N/A)	2000 (15/29)	2004 (7/9)	2008 (10/12)	2012 (7/9)	16 years (20/36)	3	0	0	3	

- Official Results Books (PDF): 2000 (p. 44), 2004 (p. 183), 2008 (p. 178), 2012 (p. 465), 2016 (p. 99).

The following table shows the historical progression of the record of total sprints won by a male water polo player at the Summer Olympics since 2000. Last updated: 15 May 2021.

Legend

- Team – Host team
- Player^{‡} – Player who won the tournament with his team

Historical progression of records: Most sprints won by a male player, all-time (statistics since 2000)
Total Sprints won	Achievement	Year	Sprinter	Age	Height	Men's team	Date	Duration of record	Ref
31	Set record	2004	Aleksandar Ćirić	26	1.92 m (6 ft 4 in)	Serbia and Montenegro	29 August 2004	3 years, 361 days	
45	Broke record	2008	Pietro Figlioli	24	1.91 m (6 ft 3 in)	Australia	24 August 2008	3 years, 354 days	
64	Broke record	2012	Pietro Figlioli	28	1.91 m (6 ft 3 in)	Australia	12 August 2012	4 years, 8 days	
78	Broke record	2016	Pietro Figlioli	32	1.91 m (6 ft 3 in)	Italy	20 August 2016	9 years, 359 days	

=== All-star teams by tournament ===
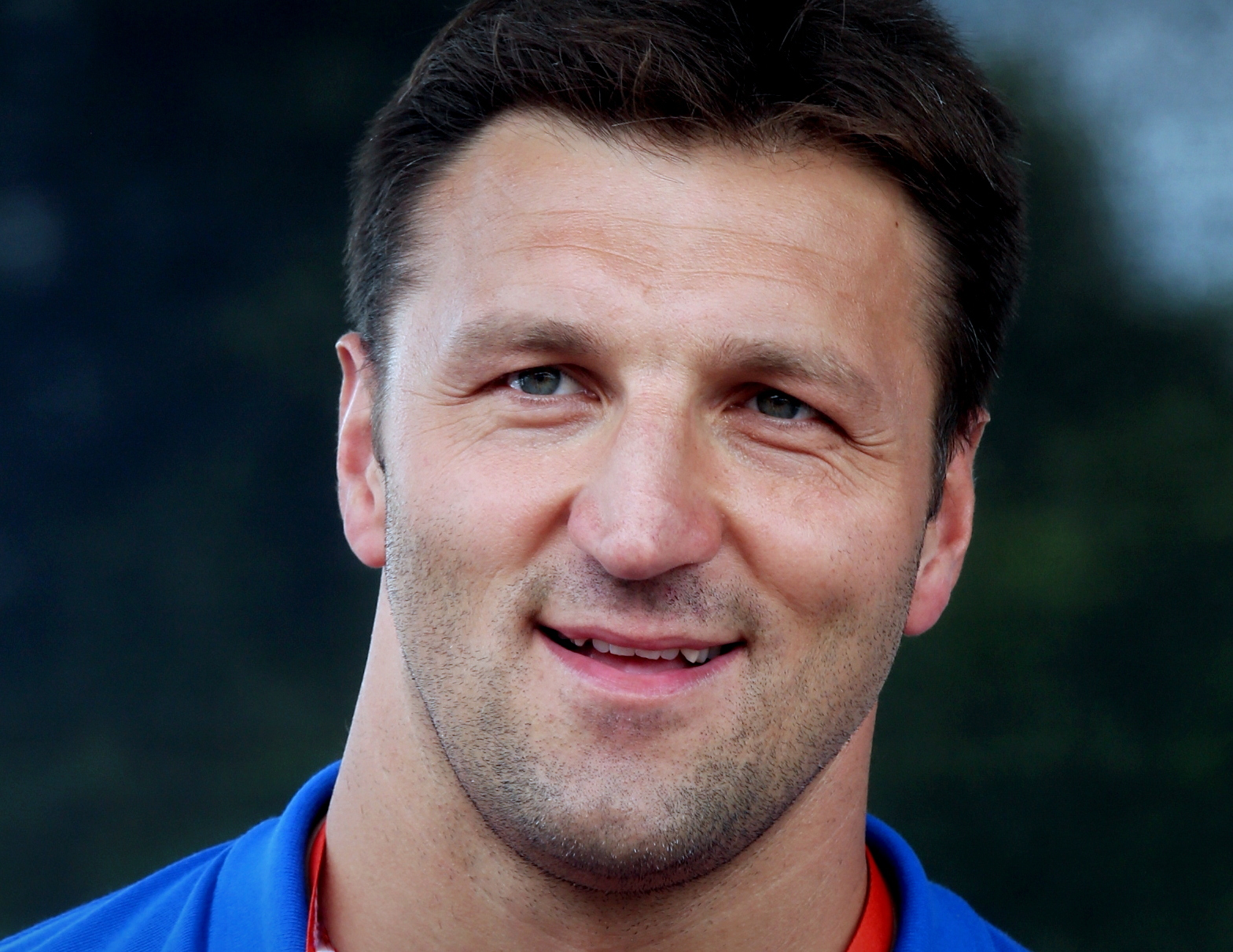
Gergely Kiss scored 14 goals at the 2004 Olympics, helping Hungary win gold. He was named the Most Valuable Player of the men's water polo tournament.

This is a summary of men's Olympic all-star teams by tournament. Last updated: 1 April 2021.

Legend and abbreviation

- Player^{‡} – Player who won the tournament with his team
- LH – Left-handed
- Eff % – Save efficiency (Saves / Shots)

Men's Olympic all-star teams by tournament (since 2004)
Year	Most Valuable Player	All-star team			Ref
2004	Hungary; Gergely Kiss^{‡} Right side player (LH); 1.98 m (6 ft 6 in)	Goalkeeper	(Serbia and Montenegro) Denis Šefik (60 saves, 58.8%)		
2004	Hungary; Gergely Kiss^{‡} Right side player (LH); 1.98 m (6 ft 6 in)	Field players	(Greece) Theodoros Chatzitheodorou (8 goals)	(Russia) Revaz Chomakhidze (15 goals)	
2004	Hungary; Gergely Kiss^{‡} Right side player (LH); 1.98 m (6 ft 6 in)	Field players	(Hungary) Tamás Kásás^{‡} (14 goals, 7 sprints won)	(Hungary) Gergely Kiss^{‡} (LH, 14 goals)	
2004	Hungary; Gergely Kiss^{‡} Right side player (LH); 1.98 m (6 ft 6 in)	Field players	(Serbia and Montenegro) Aleksandar Šapić (18 goals)	(Serbia and Montenegro) Vladimir Vujasinović (3 goals)	
2008	—N/a	Goalkeeper	(United States) Merrill Moses (70 saves, 59.8%)		
2008	—N/a	Field players	(United States) Tony Azevedo (17 goals, 2 sprints won)	(Hungary) Péter Biros^{‡} (13 goals, 3 sprints won)	
2008	—N/a	Field players	(Italy) Alessandro Calcaterra (27 goals)	(Montenegro) Mlađan Janović (13 goals, 5 sprints won)	
2008	—N/a	Field players	(Spain) Felipe Perrone (16 goals)	(Hungary) Dániel Varga^{‡} (8 goals)	
2012	Croatia; Josip Pavić^{‡} Goalkeeper; 1.95 m (6 ft 5 in)	Goalkeeper	(Croatia) Josip Pavić^{‡} (85 saves, 70.2%)		
2012	Croatia; Josip Pavić^{‡} Goalkeeper; 1.95 m (6 ft 5 in)	Field players	(Croatia) Nikša Dobud^{‡} (12 goals)	(Italy) Maurizio Felugo (12 goals)	
2012	Croatia; Josip Pavić^{‡} Goalkeeper; 1.95 m (6 ft 5 in)	Field players	(Serbia) Filip Filipović (LH, 18 goals, 2 sprints won)	(Montenegro) Aleksandar Ivović (19 goals)	
2012	Croatia; Josip Pavić^{‡} Goalkeeper; 1.95 m (6 ft 5 in)	Field players	(Spain) Felipe Perrone (16 goals)	(Serbia) Andrija Prlainović (22 goals)	
2016	Serbia; Filip Filipović^{‡} Right side player (LH); 1.96 m (6 ft 5 in)	Goalkeeper	(Croatia) Marko Bijač (57 saves, 58.2%)		
2016	Serbia; Filip Filipović^{‡} Right side player (LH); 1.96 m (6 ft 5 in)	Field players	(Montenegro) Darko Brguljan (15 goals)	(Serbia) Filip Filipović^{‡} (LH, 19 goals)	
2016	Serbia; Filip Filipović^{‡} Right side player (LH); 1.96 m (6 ft 5 in)	Field players	(Spain) Guillermo Molina (19 goals, 1 sprints won)	(Serbia) Slobodan Nikić^{‡} (10 goals)	
2016	Serbia; Filip Filipović^{‡} Right side player (LH); 1.96 m (6 ft 5 in)	Field players	(Italy) Christian Presciutti (14 goals)	(Croatia) Sandro Sukno (17 goals, 3 sprints won)	
Year	Most Valuable Player	All-star team			Ref

== Coach statistics ==
=== Most successful coaches ===
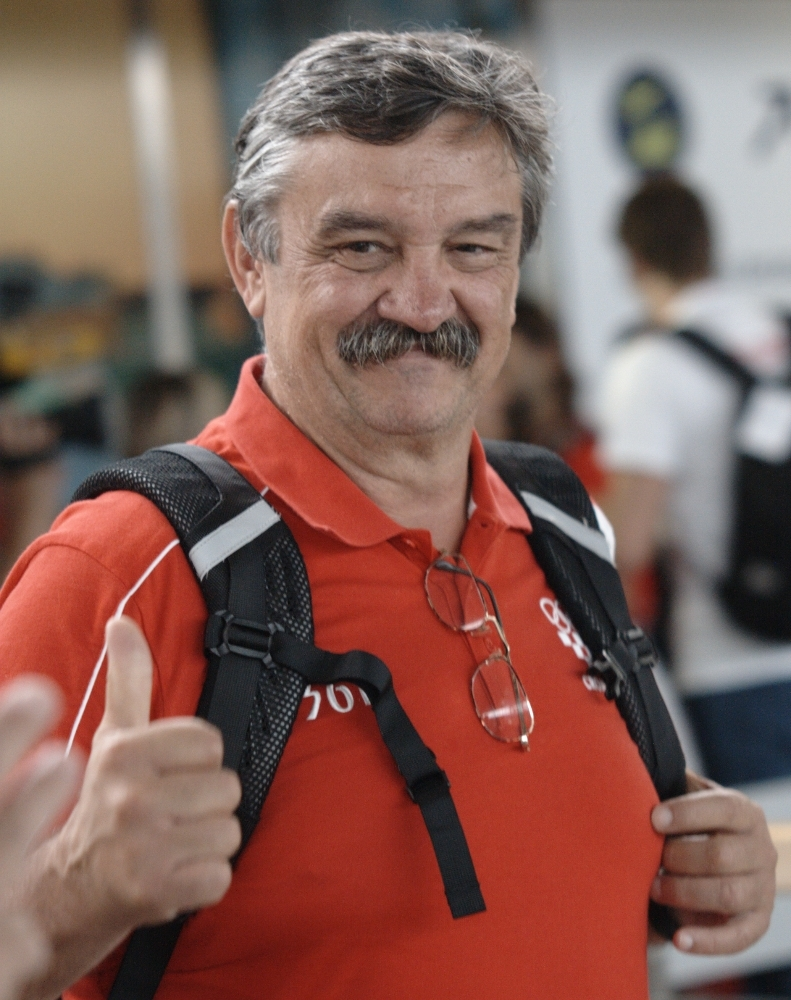
Ratko Rudić coached three men's national teams to four Olympic gold medals (Yugoslavia in 1984 and 1988, Italy in 1992 and Croatia in 2012).

The following table is pre-sorted by total number of Olympic medals (in descending order), number of Olympic gold medals (in descending order), number of Olympic silver medals (in descending order), year of winning the last Olympic medal (in ascending order), year of winning the first Olympic medal (in ascending order), name of the coach (in ascending order), respectively. Last updated: 31 March 2021.

There are four coaches who led men's national water polo teams to win three or more Olympic medals.

Ratko Rudić is the most successful water polo coach in Olympic history. As a head coach, he led three men's national water polo teams to win four Olympic gold medals and one Olympic bronze medal. He guided Yugoslavia men's national team to two consecutive gold medals in 1984 and 1988, Italy men's national team to a gold medal in 1992 and a bronze medal in 1996, and Croatia men's national team to a gold medal in 2012, making him the first and only coach to lead three different men's national water polo teams to the Olympic titles.

Dénes Kemény of Hungary is another coach who led men's national water polo team(s) to win three Olympic gold medals. Under his leadership, the Hungary men's national team won three gold in a row between 2000 and 2008, becoming the second water polo team to have an Olympic winning streak.

Dezső Gyarmati coached the Hungary men's national team to three consecutive Olympic medals, a silver in 1972, a gold in 1976, and a bronze in 1980.

Boris Popov led the Soviet Union men's national team to win an Olympic gold medal in 1980 and a bronze medal in 1988. Four years later, he coached the Unified Team to another bronze medal.

Legend

- – Hosts

Head coaches who led men's national teams to win three or more Olympic medals
Rk	Head coach	Nationality	Birth	Age	Men's team	Tournaments (finish)									Period	Medals				Ref
Rk	Head coach	Nationality	Birth	Age	Men's team	1	2	3	4	5	6	7	8	9	Period	G	S	B	T	Ref
1	Ratko Rudić	Yugoslavia	1948	36–40	Yugoslavia	1984 (1st)	1988 (1st)								32 years	4	0	1	5	
1	Ratko Rudić	Croatia	1948	44–52	Italy			1992 (1st)	1996 (3rd)	2000 (5th)					32 years	4	0	1	5	
1	Ratko Rudić	Croatia	1948	56	United States						2004 (7th)				32 years	4	0	1	5	
1	Ratko Rudić	Croatia	1948	60–64	Croatia							2008 (6th)	2012 (1st)		32 years	4	0	1	5	
1	Ratko Rudić	Croatia	1948	68	Brazil									2016 (8th)	32 years	4	0	1	5	
2	Dénes Kemény	Hungary	1954	46–58	Hungary	2000 (1st)	2004 (1st)	2008 (1st)	2012 (5th)						12 years	3	0	0	3	
3	Dezső Gyarmati	Hungary	1927	44–52	Hungary	1972 (2nd)	1976 (1st)	1980 (3rd)							8 years	1	1	1	3	
4	Boris Popov	Soviet Union	1941	39, 47	Soviet Union	1980 (1st)		1988 (3rd)							12 years	1	0	2	3	
4	Boris Popov	Russia	1941	51	(International Olympic Committee) Unified Team				1992 (3rd)						12 years	1	0	2	3	

=== Medals as coach and player ===
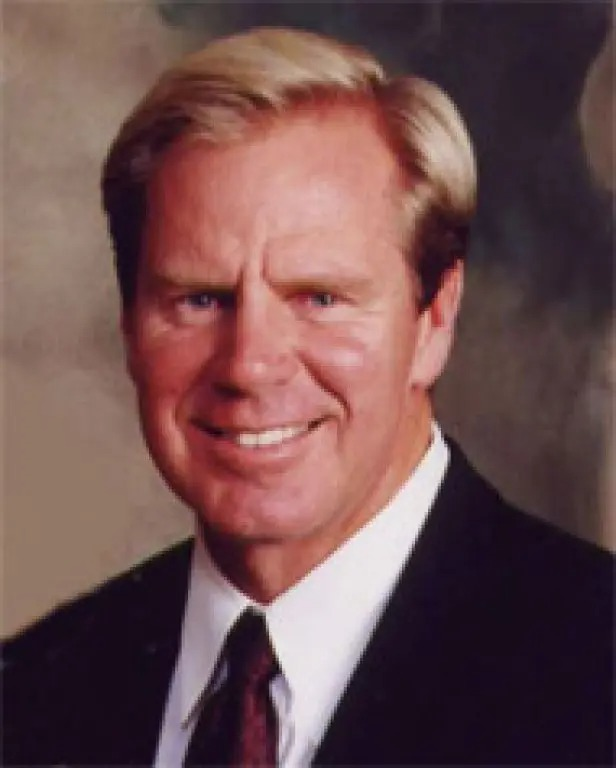
Terry Schroeder of the United States won two Olympic medals in 1984 and 1988, and then coached the United States men's national team to the podium in 2008.

The following table is pre-sorted by total number of Olympic medals (in descending order), number of Olympic gold medals (in descending order), number of Olympic silver medals (in descending order), year of winning the last Olympic medal (in ascending order), year of winning the first Olympic medal (in ascending order), name of the person (in ascending order), respectively. Last updated: 7 May 2021.

Twelve water polo players won Olympic medals and then guided men's national water polo teams to the Olympic podium as head coaches.

Dezső Gyarmati of Hungary won five Olympic medals in a row between 1948 and 1964. He coached the Hungary men's national team to three consecutive Olympic medals, including a gold in 1976, making him the only man to win Olympic gold in water polo as player and head coach in the last 100 years.

Ivo Trumbić won the silver medal in 1964 and Yugoslavia's first Olympic gold medal in water polo in 1968. He moved to the Netherlands in 1973, hired as the head coach of the Netherlands men's national team. At the 1976 Olympics in Montreal, he led the Dutch team to win a bronze medal.

Vladimir Semyonov, representing the Soviet Union, won three Olympic medals in a row between 1960 and 1968. As a head coach, he led the Soviet Union men's national water polo team to win an Olympic gold medal in 1972.

Soviet Boris Popov won a bronze medal at the Tokyo Olympics in 1964. He guided the Soviet Union men's national team to two Olympic medals in 1980 and 1988, and the Unified Team to a bronze medal in 1992.

Aleksandr Kabanov of the Soviet Union won a gold at the Munich Olympics in 1972, coached by Vladimir Semyonov. Eight years later, he won the second gold medal at the Moscow Olympics in 1980, coached by Boris Popov. As a head coach, he led Russia men's national team to win two consecutive medals in 2000 and 2004.

Ratko Rudić won a silver medal for Yugoslavia at the Moscow Olympics in 1980. Upon retirement as an athlete, he immediately entered the coaching ranks. During his career, Rudić guided three different men's national teams to five Olympic medals, more than any other coaches.

Terry Schroeder of the United States won two consecutive silver medals at the 1984 and 1988 Olympics. Twenty years later, he coached the United States men's national team to a silver in 2008, becoming the first and only non-European to achieve this feat.

Italian Alessandro Campagna won a gold medal at the Barcelona Olympics in 1992, coached by Ratko Rudić. As a head coach, he led Italy men's national team to win two medals in 2012 and 2016.

Dejan Savić won three consecutive Olympic medals between 2000 and 2008. At the 2016 Summer Games in Rio de Janeiro, he coached Serbia men's national team to the Olympic title.

Legend

- Year^{*} – As host team

Rk	Person	Birth	Height	Player				Head coach			Total medals				Ref
Rk	Person	Birth	Height	Age	Men's team	Pos	Medal	Age	Men's team	Medal	G	S	B	T	Ref
1	Dezső Gyarmati	1927	1.86 m (6 ft 1 in)	20–36	Hungary	FP	1948 (silver) , 1952 (gold) , 1956 (gold) , 1960 (bronze) , 1964 (gold)	44–52	Hungary	1972 (silver) , 1976 (gold) , 1980 (bronze)	4	2	2	8	
2	Ratko Rudić	1948	1.88 m (6 ft 2 in)	32	Yugoslavia	FP	1980 (silver)	36–40	Yugoslavia	1984 (gold) , 1988 (gold)	4	1	1	6	
2	Ratko Rudić	1948	1.88 m (6 ft 2 in)	32	Yugoslavia	FP	1980 (silver)	44–48	Italy	1992 (gold) , 1996 (bronze)	4	1	1	6	
2	Ratko Rudić	1948	1.88 m (6 ft 2 in)	32	Yugoslavia	FP	1980 (silver)	64	Croatia	2012 (gold)	4	1	1	6	
3	Dejan Savić	1975	1.90 m (6 ft 3 in)	25	Yugoslavia	FP	2000 (bronze)	41–46	Serbia	2016 (gold) , 2020 (gold)	2	1	2	5	
3	Dejan Savić	1975	1.90 m (6 ft 3 in)	29	Serbia and Montenegro	FP	2004 (silver)	41–46	Serbia	2016 (gold) , 2020 (gold)	2	1	2	5	
3	Dejan Savić	1975	1.90 m (6 ft 3 in)	33	Serbia	FP	2008 (bronze)	41–46	Serbia	2016 (gold) , 2020 (gold)	2	1	2	5	
4	Aleksandr Kabanov	1948	1.81 m (5 ft 11 in)	24, 32	Soviet Union	FP	1972 (gold) , 1980^{*} (gold)	52–56	Russia	2000 (silver) , 2004 (bronze)	2	1	1	4	
5	Vladimir Semyonov	1938	1.84 m (6 ft 0 in)	22–30	Soviet Union	FP	1960 (silver) , 1964 (bronze) , 1968 (silver)	34	Soviet Union	1972 (gold)	1	2	1	4	
6	Boris Popov	1941	1.81 m (5 ft 11 in)	23	Soviet Union	FP	1964 (bronze)	39, 47	Soviet Union	1980^{*} (gold) , 1988 (bronze)	1	0	3	4	
6	Boris Popov	1941	1.81 m (5 ft 11 in)	23	Soviet Union	FP	1964 (bronze)	51	(International Olympic Committee) Unified Team	1992 (bronze)	1	0	3	4	
7	Dezső Lemhényi	1917		30–34	Hungary	FP	1948 (silver) , 1952 (gold)	42	Hungary	1960 (bronze)	1	1	1	3	
7	Ivo Trumbić	1935	1.97 m (6 ft 6 in)	29–33	Yugoslavia	FP	1964 (silver) , 1968 (gold)	41	Netherlands	1976 (bronze)	1	1	1	3	
7	Alessandro Campagna	1963	1.82 m (6 ft 0 in)	29	Italy	FP	1992 (gold)	49–53	Italy	2012 (silver) , 2016 (bronze)	1	1	1	3	
10	Terry Schroeder	1958	1.90 m (6 ft 3 in)	25–29	United States	FP	1984^{*} (silver) , 1988 (silver)	49	United States	2008 (silver)	0	3	0	3	
11	Gianni Lonzi	1938	1.82 m (6 ft 0 in)	22	Italy	FP	1960^{*} (gold)	37	Italy	1976 (silver)	1	1	0	2	
12	Mario Majoni	1910		38	Italy	FP	1948^{*} (gold)	42	Italy	1952 (bronze)	1	0	1	2	
Rk	Person	Birth	Height	Age	Men's team	Pos	Medal	Age	Men's team	Medal	G	S	B	T	Ref
Rk	Person	Birth	Height	Player				Head coach			Total medals				Ref

== See also ==
- Water polo at the Summer Olympics
- Lists of Olympic water polo records and statistics
  - List of women's Olympic water polo tournament records and statistics
  - List of Olympic champions in men's water polo
  - List of Olympic champions in women's water polo
  - National team appearances in the men's Olympic water polo tournament
  - National team appearances in the women's Olympic water polo tournament
  - List of players who have appeared in multiple men's Olympic water polo tournaments
  - List of players who have appeared in multiple women's Olympic water polo tournaments
  - List of Olympic medalists in water polo (men)
  - List of Olympic medalists in water polo (women)
  - List of men's Olympic water polo tournament top goalscorers
  - List of women's Olympic water polo tournament top goalscorers
  - List of men's Olympic water polo tournament goalkeepers
  - List of women's Olympic water polo tournament goalkeepers
  - List of Olympic venues in water polo
- FINA Water Polo World Rankings
- List of water polo world medalists
- Major achievements in water polo by nation

== Sources ==
=== Official Reports (IOC) ===
PDF documents in the LA84 Foundation Digital Library:

- Official Report of the 1896 Olympic Games (download, archive)
- Official Report of the 1900 Olympic Games (download, archive)
- Official Report of the 1904 Olympic Games (download, archive)
- Official Report of the 1908 Olympic Games (download, archive) (pp. 359–361)
- Official Report of the 1912 Olympic Games (download, archive) (pp. 1021–1024, 1031–1037)
- Official Report of the 1920 Olympic Games (download, archive) (p. 130)
- Official Report of the 1924 Olympic Games (download, archive) (pp. 439–440, 486–494)
- Official Report of the 1928 Olympic Games (download, archive) (pp. 746–757, 797–807)
- Official Report of the 1932 Olympic Games (download, archive) (pp. 619–623, 646–652)
- Official Report of the 1936 Olympic Games, v.2 (download, archive) (pp. 345–356)
- Official Report of the 1948 Olympic Games (download, archive) (pp. 537–540, 640–647)
- Official Report of the 1952 Olympic Games (download, archive) (pp. 600–608)
- Official Report of the 1956 Olympic Games (download, archive) (pp. 592–594, 624–627)
- Official Report of the 1960 Olympic Games (download, archive) (pp. 552–555, 617–634)
- Official Report of the 1964 Olympic Games, v.2 (download, archive) (pp. 682–698)
- Official Report of the 1968 Olympic Games, v.3 (download, archive) (pp. 449–466, 811–826)
- Official Report of the 1972 Olympic Games, v.3 (download, archive) (pp. 331, 353–365)
- Official Report of the 1976 Olympic Games, v.3 (download, archive) (pp. 446–447, 484–497)
- Official Report of the 1980 Olympic Games, v.3 (download, archive) (pp. 458, 495–510)
- Official Report of the 1984 Olympic Games, v.2 (download, archive) (pp. 528–534)
- Official Report of the 1988 Olympic Games, v.2 (download, archive) (pp. 590–598)
- Official Report of the 1992 Olympic Games, v.5 (download, archive) (pp. 354, 386–400)
- Official Report of the 1996 Olympic Games, v.3 (download, archive) (pp. 56–73)

=== Official Results Books (IOC) ===
PDF documents in the LA84 Foundation Digital Library:

- Official Results Book – 2000 Olympic Games – Water Polo (download, archive)
- Official Results Book – 2004 Olympic Games – Water Polo (download, archive)
- Official Results Book – 2008 Olympic Games – Water Polo (download, archive)

PDF documents on the FINA website:

- Official Results Book – 2012 Olympic Games – Diving, Swimming, Synchronised Swimming, Water Polo (archive) (pp. 284–507)

PDF documents in the Olympic World Library:

- Official Results Book – 2016 Olympic Games – Water Polo (archive)

PDF documents on the International Olympic Committee website:

- Official Results Book – 2020 Olympic Games – Water Polo (archive)
- Official Results Book – 2024 Olympic Games – Water Polo

=== Official Reports (FINA) ===
PDF documents on the FINA website:

- HistoFINA – Water polo medalists and statistics (as of September 2019) (archive) (pp. 4–13)
- 1870–2020 | 150 years of Water Polo – Evolution of its rules (archive)

=== Official website (IOC) ===
Water polo on the International Olympic Committee website:

- Water polo
- Men's water polo

=== Olympedia ===
Water polo on the Olympedia website:

- Water polo Archived 2021-12-28 at the Wayback Machine
- Men's water polo
- Athlete count for water polo
- Water polo venues
- Water polo at the 1900 Summer Olympics (men's tournament)
- Water polo at the 1904 Summer Olympics (men's tournament)
- Water polo at the 1908 Summer Olympics (men's tournament)
- Water polo at the 1912 Summer Olympics (men's tournament)
- Water polo at the 1920 Summer Olympics (men's tournament)
- Water polo at the 1924 Summer Olympics (men's tournament)
- Water polo at the 1928 Summer Olympics (men's tournament)
- Water polo at the 1932 Summer Olympics (men's tournament)
- Water polo at the 1936 Summer Olympics (men's tournament)
- Water polo at the 1948 Summer Olympics (men's tournament)
- Water polo at the 1952 Summer Olympics (men's tournament)
- Water polo at the 1956 Summer Olympics (men's tournament)
- Water polo at the 1960 Summer Olympics (men's tournament)
- Water polo at the 1964 Summer Olympics (men's tournament)
- Water polo at the 1968 Summer Olympics (men's tournament)
- Water polo at the 1972 Summer Olympics (men's tournament)
- Water polo at the 1976 Summer Olympics (men's tournament)
- Water polo at the 1980 Summer Olympics (men's tournament)
- Water polo at the 1984 Summer Olympics (men's tournament)
- Water polo at the 1988 Summer Olympics (men's tournament)
- Water polo at the 1992 Summer Olympics (men's tournament)
- Water polo at the 1996 Summer Olympics (men's tournament)
- Water polo at the 2000 Summer Olympics (men's tournament)
- Water polo at the 2004 Summer Olympics (men's tournament)
- Water polo at the 2008 Summer Olympics (men's tournament)
- Water polo at the 2012 Summer Olympics (men's tournament)
- Water polo at the 2016 Summer Olympics (men's tournament)
- Water polo at the 2020 Summer Olympics (men's tournament)

=== Sports Reference ===
Water polo on the Sports Reference website:

- Country Medal Leaders & Athlete Medal Leaders (1900–2016) (archived)
- Men's water polo (1900–2016) (archived)
- Water polo at the 1900 Summer Games (men's tournament) (archived)
- Water polo at the 1904 Summer Games (men's tournament) (archived)
- Water polo at the 1908 Summer Games (men's tournament) (archived)
- Water polo at the 1912 Summer Games (men's tournament) (archived)
- Water polo at the 1920 Summer Games (men's tournament) (archived)
- Water polo at the 1924 Summer Games (men's tournament) (archived)
- Water polo at the 1928 Summer Games (men's tournament) (archived)
- Water polo at the 1932 Summer Games (men's tournament) (archived)
- Water polo at the 1936 Summer Games (men's tournament) (archived)
- Water polo at the 1948 Summer Games (men's tournament) (archived)
- Water polo at the 1952 Summer Games (men's tournament) (archived)
- Water polo at the 1956 Summer Games (men's tournament) (archived)
- Water polo at the 1960 Summer Games (men's tournament) (archived)
- Water polo at the 1964 Summer Games (men's tournament) (archived)
- Water polo at the 1968 Summer Games (men's tournament) (archived)
- Water polo at the 1972 Summer Games (men's tournament) (archived)
- Water polo at the 1976 Summer Games (men's tournament) (archived)
- Water polo at the 1980 Summer Games (men's tournament) (archived)
- Water polo at the 1984 Summer Games (men's tournament) (archived)
- Water polo at the 1988 Summer Games (men's tournament) (archived)
- Water polo at the 1992 Summer Games (men's tournament) (archived)
- Water polo at the 1996 Summer Games (men's tournament) (archived)
- Water polo at the 2000 Summer Games (men's tournament) (archived)
- Water polo at the 2004 Summer Games (men's tournament) (archived)
- Water polo at the 2008 Summer Games (men's tournament) (archived)
- Water polo at the 2012 Summer Games (men's tournament) (archived)
- Water polo at the 2016 Summer Games (men's tournament) (archived)
- Water polo at the 2020 Summer Games (men's tournament) (archived)

=== Todor66 ===
Water polo on the Todor66 website:

- Water polo at the Summer Games
- Water polo at the 1900 Summer Olympics (men's tournament)
- Water polo at the 1904 Summer Olympics (men's tournament)
- Water polo at the 1908 Summer Olympics (men's tournament)
- Water polo at the 1912 Summer Olympics (men's tournament)
- Water polo at the 1920 Summer Olympics (men's tournament)
- Water polo at the 1924 Summer Olympics (men's tournament)
- Water polo at the 1928 Summer Olympics (men's tournament)
- Water polo at the 1932 Summer Olympics (men's tournament)
- Water polo at the 1936 Summer Olympics (men's tournament)
- Water polo at the 1948 Summer Olympics (men's tournament)
- Water polo at the 1952 Summer Olympics (men's tournament)
- Water polo at the 1956 Summer Olympics (men's tournament)
- Water polo at the 1960 Summer Olympics (men's tournament)
- Water polo at the 1964 Summer Olympics (men's tournament)
- Water polo at the 1968 Summer Olympics (men's tournament, men's qualification)
- Water polo at the 1972 Summer Olympics (men's tournament, men's qualification)
- Water polo at the 1976 Summer Olympics (men's tournament, men's European qualification)
- Water polo at the 1980 Summer Olympics (men's tournament, men's European qualification, men's world qualification)
- Water polo at the 1984 Summer Olympics (men's tournament, men's qualification)
- Water polo at the 1988 Summer Olympics (men's tournament, men's qualification)
- Water polo at the 1992 Summer Olympics (men's tournament, men's qualification)
- Water polo at the 1996 Summer Olympics (men's tournament, men's qualification)
- Water polo at the 2000 Summer Olympics (men's tournament, men's qualification)
- Water polo at the 2004 Summer Olympics (men's tournament, men's qualification)
- Water polo at the 2008 Summer Olympics (men's tournament, men's qualification)
- Water polo at the 2012 Summer Olympics (men's tournament, men's qualification)
- Water polo at the 2016 Summer Olympics (men's tournament, men's qualification)
- Water polo at the 2020 Summer Olympics (men's tournament, men's qualification)
- Water polo at the 2024 Summer Olympics (men's tournament, men's qualification)
