= 2014 LEN Super Cup =

Water polo match

The 2014 LEN Super Cup was a water polo match organized by LEN and contested by the reigning champions of the two main European club competitions, the 2013-14 LEN Champions League and the 2013-14 LEN Euro Cup, in Barcelona, Spain on 21 November 2014.

== Squads ==
The two squads were CNA Barceloneta and Spartak Volgograd.

=== CNA Barceloneta ===
| No. | Name | Date of birth | Position | L/R |
|---|---|---|---|---|
| 1 | Daniel Lopez | 16 April 1980 | Goalkeeper | R |
| 2 | Balasz Sziranyi | 10 January 1983 | | R |
| 3 | Felipe Perrone | 27 February 1986 | | R |
| 4 | Bernardo Oneto | 12 November 1993 | | R |
| 5 | Albert Espanol | 29 October 1985 | | R |
| 6 | Marc Minguell | 14 January 1986 | | R |
| 7 | Marc Roca | 21 January 1988 | | R |
| 8 | Gonzalo Echenique | 27 April 1990 | | R |
| 9 | Nemanja Ubovic | 24 February 1991 | | R |
| 10 | Francisco Fernandez | 21 June 1986 | | R |
| 11 | Gonzalo Lopez | 21 March 1989 | | R |
| 12 | Roger Tahull | 11 May 1997 | | R |
| 13 | Miguel Linares | 16 April 1997 | Goalkeeper | R |

=== Spartak Volgograd ===
| No. | Name | Date of birth | Position | L/R |
|---|---|---|---|---|
| 1 | Alexander Fedorov | 26 January 1981 | Goalkeeper | R |
| 2 | Nikolay Lazarev | 26 February 1992 | | R |
| 3 | Vitaly Yurchik | 17 May 1983 | | R |
| 4 | Yury Cheshev | 26 June 1986 | | R |
| 5 | Alexey Panfili | 5 January 1974 | | R |
| 6 | Artem Ashaev | 5 December 1988 | | R |
| 7 | Pavel Khalturin | 15 September 1983 | | R |
| 8 | Ihar Bychkou | 21 January 1994 | | R |
| 9 | Adel Latypov | 16 December 1990 | | R |
| 10 | Andrey Rekechinskiy | 7 January 1981 | | R |
| 11 | Sergey Lisunov | 12 October 1986 | | R |
| 12 | Alexey Agarkov | 6 April 1983 | | R |
| 13 | Viktor Ivanov | 20 April 1984 | Goalkeeper | R |
| 14 | Stepan Andryukov | 12 February 1991 | | R |

== See also ==
- 2014 Women's LEN Super Cup
