= Afroudakis =

Afroudakis (Greek: Αφρουδάκης) is a Greek surname. The female form of the surname is Afroudaki. Notable people with the surname include:

- Christos Afroudakis (born 1984), Greek water polo player
- Georgios Afroudakis (born 1976), Greek water polo player
