= Christoforidis =

Christoforidis is a surname. Notable people with the surname include:

- Anton Christoforidis (1917–1985), Greek boxer
- Takis Christoforidis, Greek actor
- Periklis Christoforidis, Greek actor
- Stavros Christoforidis (born 1974), Greek biathlete
- Christos Christoforidis, Swedish footballer
- Nikolaos Christoforidis, Greek water polo player
