= 2014–15 LEN Champions League squads =

This is a list of the squads with their players that competed at the 2014–15 LEN Champions League.

== CNA Barceloneta ==
No.	Name	Date of birth	Position	L/R	Height	Weight
1	Albert Fandos Fulquet	14 July 1986	Goalkeeper	R		
2	Gonzalo Oscar Echenique	27 April 1990		R	194 cm	102 kg
3	Nemanja Ubović	24 February 1991		R	193 cm	104 kg
4	S. Balasz Marton Sziranyi	10 January 1983		R	196 cm	115 kg
5	Felipe Perrone Rocha	27 February 1986		R	188 cm	90 kg
6	Albert Llovera Castillo	10 April 1998		R		
7	Daniel Lopez Pinedo	16 July 1980	Goalkeeper	R	190 cm	91 kg
8	Miguel Linares Torras	16 April 1997	Goalkeeper	R	192 cm	83 kg
9	A. Marc Minguell	14 January 1985		R	186 cm	93 kg
10	Roger Tahull Compte	11 May 1997		R	194 cm	89 kg
11	M. Francisco Fernandez	21 June 1986		R	184 cm	86 kg
12	Alberto Munarriz Egana	19 May 1994		R		
13	Gonzalo Lopez Escribano	28 March 1989		R	186 cm	84 kg
14	Bernardo Oneto Gomes	12 November 1993		R	193 cm	97 kg
15	Marc Roca Barcelo	21 January 1988		R	187 cm	92 kg
16	Nikolas Paul Garcia	14 June 1999		R		
17	Albert Espanol Lifante	29 November 1985		R	189 cm	81 kg
18	Nacho Soler I Perez	22 April 1997		R		
2	Rafael Montano Comes	2 June 1999		R		
4	Jorge Gimenez Garcia	27 March 1998		R		
3	Rafael Montano	2 June 1999		R		

== AN Brescia ==
No.	Name	Date of birth	Position	L/R	Height	Weight
1	Marco Del Lungo	1 March 1990	Goalkeeper	R	190 cm	93 kg
2	Brando Dian	18 January 1991	Goalkeeper	R	186 cm	76 kg
3	Stefano Guerrato	2 October 1997		R		
4	Daniele Giorgi	6 January 1985		R	186 cm	83 kg
5	Deni Jovanovic Fiorentini	5 June 1984		R	191 cm	84 kg
6	Federico Pagani	2 May 1985		R		
7	Valerio Rizzo	21 September 1984		R	174 cm	83 kg
8	Guillermo Molina Rios	16 March 1984		R	194 cm	112 kg
9	Nicholas Presciutti	14 December 1993		R	190 cm	90 kg
10	Alessandro Nora	24 May 1987		R	191 cm	88 kg
11	Christian Presciutti	27 November 1982		R	184 cm	86 kg
12	Michael Bodegas	3 May 1987		R	192 cm	102 kg
13	Christian Napolitano	22 July 1992		R	192 cm	96 kg
14	Lorenzo Bruni	8 April 1994		R		

== ZF Eger ==
No.	Name	Date of birth	Position	L/R	Height	Weight
1	Krisztián Bedő	4 May 1993		R	193 cm	110 kg
2	Péter Biros	5 April 1976		R	194 cm	100 kg
3	Balázs Hárai	5 April 1987		R	203 cm	115 kg
4	Bálint Lőrincz	10 March 1994		R	185 cm	85 kg
5	Gergő Zalánki	26 February 1995		R		
6	Dániel Angyal	29 March 1992		R	202 cm	102 kg
7	Boris Vapenski	9 October 1990		R	190 cm	102 kg
8	Kristóf Csoma	26 January 1992	Goalkeeper	R	196 cm	90 kg
9	Uroš Čučković	25 April 1990		R	200 cm	103 kg
10	Branislav Mitrović	30 January 1985	Goalkeeper	R	201 cm	103 kg
11	Norbert Hosnyánszky	4 March 1984		R	196 cm	103 kg
12	István Márton Szivós	19 August 1981		R	192 cm	96 kg
13	Balázs Erdélyi	16 February 1990		R	196 cm	94 kg
14	Miloš Ćuk	21 December 1990		R	191 cm	100 kg
15	Olivér Hornyák	7 April 1996		R		
16	Gergely Antal	11 April 1996		R		
17	Barnabás Biros	5 June 1997		R		
18	Boldizsár Csiszár	3 March 1997		R		
19	Győző Gergely Szivós	17 July 1996		R		
20	Máté László Tóth	11 August 1996		R		

== Galatasaray ==
No.	Name	Date of birth	Position	L/R	Height	Weight
1	Mlađan Janović	11 June 1984		R	190 cm	93 kg
2	Vjekoslav Pasković	23 March 1985		R	181 cm	85 kg
3	Berk Biyik	1 January 1993		R	190 cm	
4	Safak Simsek	3 November 1997		R	175 cm	
5	Srđan Aksentijević	31 January 1986	Driver	R	188 cm	
6	Slobodan Nikić	25 January 1983		R	196 cm	94 kg
7	Osman Selim Gulenc	7 July 1992		R	190 cm	
8	Miloš Šćepanović	9 October 1982	Goalkeeper	R	185 cm	88 kg
9	Mihajlo Korolija	17 April 1980		R	200 cm	
10	Can Yuksek	17 September 1994		R	184 cm	
11	Engin Ege Colak	3 January 1997		R	188 cm	
12	Nikola Vukčević	14 November 1985		R	202 cm	
13	Berk Gezek	13 November 1992	Goalkeeper	R		
14	Nesfet Togkan Ozbek	2 September 1994		R		
15	Jesse Aaron Smith	27 April 1983		R	191 cm	
16	Oguz Berke Senemoglu	3 July 1995		R	185 cm	
17	Atakan Destici	9 March 1997		R	187 cm	
18	Arda Ilkser Guclu	4 April 1997		R	178 cm	
19	Filip Kljajević	25 June 1983		R		
20	Burtay Akkaya	2 May 1998		R		
21	Baturay Bahadir	27 May 1998		R		
22	Hikmet Batuhan Öztemel	7 January 1998		R		
23	Eray Turan	23 February 1998		R		

== JUG Dubrovnik ==
No.	Name	Date of birth	Position	L/R	Height	Weight
1	Aaron Younger	25 September 1991		R	193 cm	100 kg
2	Andro Bušlje	4 January 1986		R	200 cm	115 kg
3	Ante Viskovic	27 October 1993		R	197 cm	97 kg
4	Loren Fatović	16 November 1996		R	187 cm	80 kg
5	Marko Bautovic	3 August 1991		R		
6	Marko Bijač	12 January 1991	Goalkeeper	R	200 cm	81 kg
7	Marko Buconic	10 April 1996		R		
8	Marko Ivankovic	17 December 1991		R	183 cm	80 kg
9	Marko Macan	26 April 1993		R	195 cm	100 kg
10	Miho Bošković	11 November 1983		R	197 cm	100 kg
11	Nicolas Constantin-B.	5 December 1991		R	190 cm	100 kg
12	Nikola Janović	22 March 1980		R	191 cm	100 kg
13	Nikola Pavličević	13 February 1997	Goalkeeper	R		
14	Nikša Dobud	5 August 1985		R	198 cm	118 kg
15	Paulo Obradović	9 March 1986		R	190 cm	100 kg
16	Pavo Marković	20 April 1985		R	190 cm	94 kg
17	Teo Dadić	15 January 1997		R		
18	Toni Jarak	19 March 1998	Goalkeeper	R		
19	Toni Popadic Batina	5 November 1994	Goalkeeper	R	204 cm	96 kg
20	Toni Paskojevic	20 June 1995		R		

== Olympiacos ==
No.	Name	Date of birth	Position	L/R	Height	Weight
1	Nikolaos Deligiannis	3 September 1976	Goalkeeper	R	190 cm	96 kg
2	Konstantinos Galanidis	1 September 1990	Goalkeeper	R		
3	Evangelos Delakas	8 February 1985		R		
4	Kyriakos Pontikeas	9 May 1991		R		
5	Nikola Rađen	29 January 1985		R	195 cm	103 kg
6	Alexandros Gounas	3 October 1989		R		
7	Georgios Dervisis	30 October 1994		R		
8	Ioannis Fountoulis	25 May 1988		R		
9	Angelos Vlachopoulos	28 September 1991		R	180 cm	73 kg
10	Georgios Ntoskas	11 November 1984		R	186 cm	99 kg
11	Emmanouil Mylonakis	9 April 1985		R	185 cm	74 kg
12	Blai Mallarach	21 August 1987		R		
13	Emmanouil Liapakis	24 July 1997		R		
14	Konstantinos Mourikis	11 July 1988		R		
15	Christodoulos Kolomvos	26 October 1988		R		

== Partizan ==
No.	Name	Date of birth	Position	L/R	Height	Weight
1	Draško Gogov	18 February 1995		R		
2	Marko Manojlović	1 April 1996		R		
3	Mateja Asanović	30 October 1995		R		
4	Lucas Gielen	26 November 1990		R		
5	Ognjen Stojanović	27 April 1996		R		
6	Lazar Brakočević	14 August 1996		R		
7	Marko Janković	27 December 1998		R		
8	Alen Osmanović	1 February 1996		R		
9	Đorđe Lazić	19 May 1996		R		
10	Slobodan Soro	23 December 1978	Goalkeeper	R		
11	Mihajlo Repanović	10 August 1995		R		
12	Nemanja Vico	19 November 1994		R		
13	Nemanja Bakić	4 May 1997		R		
14	Nikola Radulović	2 December 1995		R		
15	Aleksandar Andrejević	8 April 1996		R		
16	Filip Radojević	2 November 1997	Goalkeeper	R		
17	Filip Janković	5 January 1996		R		
18	Nikola Jakšić	17 January 1997		R		
19	Gavril Subotić	15 September 1995		R		
20	Đorđe Tanasković	2 March 1994		R		
21	Dušan Mandić	16 June 1994		R		
22	Dimitrije Rističević	7 November 1992		R		
23	Nemanja Radonjić	1 January 1997		R		
24	Nemanja Vučićević	4 August 1996		R		
25	Đorđe Vučinić	15 January 1999		R		

== VK Primorje ==
No.	Name	Date of birth	Position	L/R	Height	Weight
1	Frano Vićan	24 January 1976	Goalkeeper	R	193 cm	95 kg
2	Cosmin Radu	9 November 1981		R	194 cm	105 kg
3	Duje Peroš	15 February 1992		R	186 cm	89 kg
4	Ivan Krapić	14 February 1989		R	196 cm	106 kg
5	Sandro Sukno	30 June 1990		R	201 cm	94 kg
6	Petar Muslim	26 March 1988		R	200 cm	104 kg
7	Antonio Petrović	24 September 1982		R	193 cm	95 kg
8	Anđelo Šetka	14 September 1985		R	186 cm	88 kg
9	Javier Garcia Gadea	5 January 1984		R	198 cm	93 kg
10	Ivan Buljubašić	31 October 1987		R	198 cm	110 kg
11	Nino Mudrazija	21 July 1994		R	195 cm	90 kg
12	Dario Rakovac	13 August 1996		R		
13	Damir Burić	2 December 1980		R	205 cm	120 kg
14	Dejan Lazović	8 February 1990	Goalkeeper	R	195 cm	98 kg
15	Marko Elez	9 September 1980		R	193 cm	103 kg
16	Mislav Vrlić	4 April 1996		R	197 cm	94 kg
17	Fran Cubranic	11 June 1997	Goalkeeper	R		
18	Jakov Kren	8 October 1998	Goalkeeper	R		
19	Davor Car	5 December 1979		R		
20	Luka Krizanec	17 February 1983		R		
21	Ivo Radetić	16 October 1997		R		

== VK Radnički ==
No.	Name	Date of birth	Position	L/R	Height	Weight
1	Josip Vrlic	25 April 1986		R		
2	Djordje Sormaz	18 May 1996		R		
3	Stefan Zivojinovic	8 July 1989	Goalkeeper	R		
4	Nikola Dedovic	25 January 1992		R		
5	Ilija Prekogacic	2 April 1996		R		
6	Marko Cuk	10 January 1984		R		
7	Ivan Basara	25 October 1988		R	190 cm	
8	Nikola Bogdanovic	21 December 1985		R		
9	Luka Bosic	13 February 1998		R		
10	Vuk Verovic	26 September 1998		R		
11	Lazar Zivadinovic	5 April 1996		R		
12	Uros Jevtic	30 August 1999		R		
13	Srdjan Vuksanovic	5 July 1992		R		
14	Bozidar Mijatovic	6 January 1996		R		
15	Aleksandar Ciric	30 December 1977		R		
16	Boris Popovic	13 April 1990		R		
17	Dusan Markovic	3 May 1990		R		
18	Filip Trajkovic	23 May 1982		R		
19	Zdravko Radic	24 June 1979	Goalkeeper	R		
20	Marko Petkovic	3 March 1989		R		
21	Milos Milicic	10 May 1991		R		
22	Stefan Popovic	20 November 1993	Goalkeeper	R		
23	Nemanja Mladenovic	12 June 1998		R		
24	Rade Joksimovic	11 July 1996		R		
25	Nebojsa Toholj	16 February 1997		R		

== Pro Recco ==
No.	Name	Date of birth	Position	L/R	Height	Weight
1	Stefano Tempesti	9 June 1979	Goalkeeper	R	203 cm	97 kg
2	Giacomo Pastorino	7 June 1980	Goalkeeper	R	191 cm	95 kg
3	Fabio Viola	9 January 1996	Goalkeeper	R	195 cm	103 kg
4	Aleksandar Ivović	24 February 1986		R	198 cm	107 kg
5	Niccolo' Gitto	12 November 1986		R	190 cm	89 kg
6	Niccolo' Figari	24 January 1988		R	198 cm	90 kg
7	Massimo Giacoppo	10 May 1983		R	183 cm	82 kg
8	Andrea Fondelli	27 February 1994		R	188 cm	85 kg
9	Alex Giorgetti	24 December 1987		R	186 cm	78 kg
10	Maurizio Felugo	4 March 1981		R	189 cm	87 kg
11	Pietro Figlioli	29 May 1984		R	192 cm	97 kg
12	Francesco Di Fulvio	15 August 1993		R	188 cm	82 kg
13	Andrija Prlainović	28 April 1987		R	187 cm	95 kg
14	Matteo Aicardi	19 April 1986		R	192 cm	104 kg
15	Federico Lapenna	19 April 1988		R	185 cm	100 kg
16	Filip Filipović	5 February 1987		R	197 cm	101 kg
17	Maro Joković	1 October 1987		R	203 cm	96 kg
18	Duško Pijetlović	25 April 1985		R	192 cm	105 kg

== Spandau04 ==
No.	Name	Date of birth	Position	L/R	Height	Weight
1	Laszlo Baksa	29 January 1986	Goalkeeper	R	195 cm	88 kg
2	Tim Höhne	9 March 1987	Goalkeeper	R	192 cm	92 kg
3	Moritz Oeler	21 October 1985		R	188 cm	84 kg
4	Marko Stamm	30 August 1988		R	187 cm	96 kg
5	Marin Restovic	22 July 1990	Goalkeeper	R	193 cm	93 kg
6	Tobias Preuss	3 August 1988		R		
7	Mateo Cuk	21 February 1990		R	196 cm	105 kg
8	Martin Famera	4 November 1988		R		
9	Maurice Jüngling	6 October 1991		R	184 cm	88 kg
10	Tim Donner	8 February 1993		R	192 cm	87 kg
11	Petar Markovic	1 December 1993		R	191 cm	93 kg
12	Maximilian Costa	21 November 1996		R	182 cm	76 kg
13	Erik Miers	20 October 1983		R	203 cm	98 kg
14	Christian Schlanstedt	10 January 1987		R		
15	Vincent Hebisch	22 January 1995		R		
16	Philipp Gottfried	12 July 1994		R	186 cm	78 kg
17	Fabian Schroeder	11 September 1982		R		
18	Maximilian Ghalayini	17 May 1997		R		
19	Josef Immermann	29 April 1997		R		
20	Philipp Kurowski	13 March 1997		R		
21	Marc Politze	21 October 1977		R		
22	Tomi Tadim	25 August 1997		R		
23	Wolf Moog	8 February 1997		R		

== Szolnoki Vsk ==
No.	Name	Date of birth	Position	L/R	Height	Weight
1	Richard Nagy	8 January 1992	Goalkeeper	R		
2	Marton Vamos	24 June 1992		R	203 cm	105 kg
3	Norbert Madaras	12 January 1979		R	191 cm	91 kg
4	David Jansik	28 February 1991		R	196 cm	98 kg
5	Živko Gocić	22 August 1982		R	193 cm	102 kg
6	Viktor Nagy	24 July 1984	Goalkeeper	R	198 cm	98 kg
7	Otto Jozsa	19 July 1995		R		
8	Tamás Mezei	14 September 1990		R	198 cm	100 kg
9	Milan Kalmar	12 October 1993		R		
10	Zoltan Hangay	17 October 1988		R		
11	Gabor Kis	27 September 1982		R	194 cm	114 kg
12	Márton Tóth	28 September 1985		R	193 cm	104 kg
13	Attila Decker	25 August 1987	Goalkeeper	R	197 cm	87 kg
14	Henrik Simon	17 November 1997		R		
15	Milan Aleksić	13 May 1986		R	193 cm	100 kg
16	Denes Dorian Lukacs	17 June 1997		R		
17	Denes Andor Varga	29 March 1987		R	193 cm	96 kg
18	Daniel Rudolf Varga	25 September 1983		R	201 cm	98 kg
19	Stefan Mitrović	29 March 1988		R	195 cm	91 kg
