= Nikolaos Baltatzis-Mavrokordatos =

Greek water polo player (b. 1897)

Personal information
- Nationality: Greek
- Born: 1897 Athens, Greece

Sport
- Sport: Water polo

Nikolaos Baltatzis-Mavrokordatos (born 1897, date of death unknown) was a Greek water polo player. He competed at the 1920 Summer Olympics and the 1924 Summer Olympics. He was also a politician, and was elected to the Greek parliament as a member of the People's Party in 1936.

== See also ==
- Greece men's Olympic water polo team records and statistics
- List of men's Olympic water polo tournament goalkeepers
