= Dmitry Gorshkov =

Russian water polo player (born 1967)

Personal information
- Born: 29 April 1967 (age 59)
Medal record
Men's water polo
Olympic Games
Representing the Unified Team
Bronze medal – third place	1992 Barcelona	Team competition
Representing Russia
Silver medal – second place	2000 Sydney	Team competition
Bronze medal – third place	2004 Athens	Team competition
FINA World Cup
Gold medal – first place	2002 Belgrade	Team competition

Dmitry Gorshkov (born 29 April 1967 in Moscow) is a Russian water polo player who played on the silver medal squad at the 2000 Summer Olympics and the bronze medal squads at the 1992 Summer Olympics and 2004 Summer Olympics.

At the 2000 Summer Olympics, Gorshkov scored the game-winning goal during a marathon semi-final game against Spain.

== See also ==
- Russia men's Olympic water polo team records and statistics
- List of Olympic medalists in water polo (men)
- List of players who have appeared in multiple men's Olympic water polo tournaments
- List of World Aquatics Championships medalists in water polo
