= Russia men's Olympic water polo team records and statistics =

Statistics of a Russian Olympic team

This article lists various water polo records and statistics in relation to the Russia men's national water polo team at the Summer Olympics.

The Russia men's national water polo team has participated in 3 of 27 official men's water polo tournaments.

== Abbreviations ==
Apps	Appearances	Rk	Rank	Ref	Reference	Cap No.	Water polo cap number
Pos	Playing position	FP	Field player	GK	Goalkeeper	ISHOF	International Swimming Hall of Fame
L/R	Handedness	L	Left-handed	R	Right-handed	Oly debut	Olympic debut in water polo
(C)	Captain	p.	page	pp.	pages		

== Team statistics ==
=== Comprehensive results by tournament ===
Notes:

- Results of Olympic qualification tournaments are not included. Numbers refer to the final placing of each team at the respective Games.
- At the 1904 Summer Olympics, a water polo tournament was contested, but only American contestants participated. Currently the International Olympic Committee (IOC) and the International Swimming Federation (FINA) consider water polo event as part of unofficial program in 1904.
- Related teams: Soviet Union men's Olympic water polo team^{†} (statistics), Unified Team men's Olympic water polo team^{†}. (Note: In 1992, 12 of the 15 former Soviet Republics competed together as the Unified Team and marched under the Olympic Flag in the Barcelona Games.)
- Last updated: 5 May 2021.

Legend

- 1 – Champions
- 2 – Runners-up
- 3 – Third place
- 4 – Fourth place
- — – The nation did not participate in the Games
- Q – Qualified for forthcoming tournament
- – Hosts
- Team^{†} – Defunct team

Men's team	00	04	08	12	20	24	28	32	36	48	52	56	60	64	68	72	76	80	84	88	92	96	00	04	08	12	16	20	Years
Russian Federation	—	—	—	—	—	Part of Soviet Union																5	2	3					3
Soviet Union^{†} (Note: The Olympic Committee of the Soviet Union was formed on 21 April 1951, and was recognised by the International Olympic Committee on 7 May 1951.)	—	—	—	—	—	—	—	—	—	—	7	3	2	3	2	1	8	1	—	3	Defunct								9
(International Olympic Committee) Unified Team^{†}	—	—	—	—	—	Part of Soviet Union															3	Defunct							1
Total teams	7		4	6	12	13	14	5	16	18	21	10	16	13	15	16	12	12	12	12	12	12	12	12	12	12	12	12	

=== Number of appearances ===
Last updated: 5 May 2021.

Men's team	Apps	Record streak	Active streak	Debut	Most recent	Best finish	Confederation
Russia	3	3	0	1996	2004	Runners-up	Europe – LEN

=== Best finishes ===
Last updated: 5 May 2021.

Men's team	Best finish	Apps	Confederation
Russia	Runners-up (2000)	3	Europe – LEN

=== Finishes in the top four ===
Last updated: 5 May 2021.

Men's team	Total	Champions	Runners-up	Third place	Fourth place	First	Last
Russia	2		1 (2000)	1 (2004)		2000	2004

=== Medal table ===
Last updated: 5 May 2021.

Men's team	Gold	Silver	Bronze	Total
Russia (RUS)	0	1	1	2

== Player statistics ==
=== Multiple appearances ===
The following table is pre-sorted by number of Olympic appearances (in descending order), year of the last Olympic appearance (in ascending order), year of the first Olympic appearance (in ascending order), date of birth (in ascending order), name of the player (in ascending order), respectively.

- Number of five-time Olympians: 0
- Number of four-time Olympians: 2
- Last updated: 27 July 2021.

Abbreviation

- EUN – Unified Team
- RUS – Russia

Male athletes who competed in water polo at four or more Olympics
Apps	Player	Birth	Pos	Water polo tournaments					Age of first/last	ISHOF member	Note	Ref
Apps	Player	Birth	Pos	1	2	3	4	5	Age of first/last	ISHOF member	Note	Ref
4	Dmitry Gorshkov	1967	FP	1992; EUN	1996; RUS	2000; RUS	2004; RUS		25/37			
4	Nikolay Kozlov	1972	FP	1992; EUN	1996; RUS	2000; RUS	2004; RUS		20/32			

Note:

- Nikolay Maksimov is listed in Kazakhstan men's Olympic water polo team records and statistics.

=== Multiple medalists ===
The following table is pre-sorted by total number of Olympic medals (in descending order), number of Olympic gold medals (in descending order), number of Olympic silver medals (in descending order), year of receiving the last Olympic medal (in ascending order), year of receiving the first Olympic medal (in ascending order), name of the player (in ascending order), respectively.

- Number of four-time Olympic medalists: 0
- Number of three-time Olympic medalists: 2
- Last updated: 1 May 2021.

Abbreviation

- EUN – Unified Team
- RUS – Russia

Male athletes who won three or more Olympic medals in water polo
Rk	Player	Birth	Height	Pos	Water polo tournaments					Period (age of first/last)	Medals				Ref
Rk	Player	Birth	Height	Pos	1	2	3	4	5	Period (age of first/last)	G	S	B	T	Ref
1	Dmitry Gorshkov	1967	1.80 m (5 ft 11 in)	FP	1992; EUN	1996; RUS	2000; RUS	2004; RUS		12 years (25/37)	0	1	2	3	
1	Nikolay Kozlov	1972	1.92 m (6 ft 4 in)	FP	1992; EUN	1996; RUS	2000; RUS	2004; RUS		12 years (20/32)	0	1	2	3	

=== Top goalscorers ===
The following table is pre-sorted by number of total goals (in descending order), year of the last Olympic appearance (in ascending order), year of the first Olympic appearance (in ascending order), name of the player (in ascending order), respectively.

- Number of goalscorers (50+ goals): 0
- Number of goalscorers (40–49 goals): 1
- Number of goalscorers (30–39 goals): 1
- Last updated: 1 April 2021.

Abbreviation

- EUN – Unified Team
- RUS – Russia
- URS – Soviet Union

Male players with 30 or more goals at the Olympics
Rk	Player	Birth	L/R	Total goals	Water polo tournaments (goals)					Age of first/last	ISHOF member	Note	Ref
Rk	Player	Birth	L/R	Total goals	1	2	3	4	5	Age of first/last	ISHOF member	Note	Ref
1	Dmitry Apanasenko	1967		40	1988; URS (14)	1992; EUN (20)	1996; RUS (6)			21/29			
2	Aleksandr Yeryshov	1973	Right	37	1996 (10)	2000 (17)	2004 (10)			23/31			

Sources:

- Official Reports (PDF): 1996;
- Official Results Books (PDF): 2000 (pp. 45, 49, 53, 63, 66, 69, 72, 75), 2004 (pp. 219–220).

=== Goalkeepers ===
The following table is pre-sorted by edition of the Olympics (in ascending order), cap number or name of the goalkeeper (in ascending order), respectively.

Last updated: 1 April 2021.

Abbreviation

- Eff % – Save efficiency (Saves / Shots)

Year	Cap No.	Goalkeeper	Birth	Age	Saves	Shots	Eff %	ISHOF member	Note	Ref
1996	1	Nikolay Maksimov	1972	23	58	115	50.4%		Starting goalkeeper	
1996	13	Dmitri Dugin	1968	27	6	21	28.6%			
2000 (silver)	1	Nikolay Maksimov (2)	1972	27	58	99	58.6%		Starting goalkeeper	
2000 (silver)	3	Dmitri Dugin (2)	1968	32	18	35	51.4%			
2004 (bronze)	1	Nikolay Maksimov (3)	1972	31	62	104	59.6%		Starting goalkeeper	
2004 (bronze)	2	Aleksandr Fyodorov	1981	23	2	5	40.0%			

Sources:

- Official Reports (PDF): 1996 (pp. 57–61, 70–72);
- Official Results Books (PDF): 2000 (pp. 45, 49, 53, 63, 66, 69, 72, 75), 2004 (pp. 219–220).

Note:

- Nikolay Maksimov is also listed in Kazakhstan men's Olympic water polo team records and statistics.

=== Top sprinters ===
The following table is pre-sorted by number of total sprints won (in descending order), year of the last Olympic appearance (in ascending order), year of the first Olympic appearance (in ascending order), name of the sprinter (in ascending order), respectively.

* Number of sprinters (30+ sprints won, since 2000): 0

- Number of sprinters (20–29 sprints won, since 2000): 1
- Number of sprinters (10–19 sprints won, since 2000): 1
- Number of sprinters (5–9 sprints won, since 2000): 1
- Last updated: 15 May 2021.

Abbreviation

- Eff % – Efficiency (Sprints won / Sprints contested)

Male players with 5 or more sprints won at the Olympics (statistics since 2000)
Rk	Sprinter	Birth	Total sprints won	Total sprints contested	Eff %	Water polo tournaments (sprints won / contested)					Age of first/last	ISHOF member	Note	Ref
Rk	Sprinter	Birth	Total sprints won	Total sprints contested	Eff %	1	2	3	4	5	Age of first/last	ISHOF member	Note	Ref
1	Sergey Garbuzov	1974	27	29	93.1%	1996 (N/A)	2000 (7/8)	2004 (20/21)			22/30			
2	Roman Balashov	1977	14	18	77.8%	2000 (11/15)	2004 (3/3)				23/27			
3	Irek Zinnurov	1969	9	19	47.4%	2000 (5/11)	2004 (4/8)				31/35			

- Official Results Books (PDF): 2000 (pp. 45, 49, 53, 63, 66, 69, 72, 75), 2004 (pp. 219–220).

== Coach statistics ==
=== Medals as coach and player ===
The following table is pre-sorted by total number of Olympic medals (in descending order), number of Olympic gold medals (in descending order), number of Olympic silver medals (in descending order), year of winning the last Olympic medal (in ascending order), year of winning the first Olympic medal (in ascending order), name of the person (in ascending order), respectively. Last updated: 5 May 2021.

Aleksandr Kabanov of the Soviet Union won a gold at the Munich Olympics in 1972. Eight years later, he won the second gold medal at the Moscow Olympics in 1980. As a head coach, he led Russia men's national team to win two consecutive medals in 2000 and 2004.

Legend

- Year^{*} – As host team

Rk	Person	Birth	Height	Player				Head coach			Total medals				Ref
Rk	Person	Birth	Height	Age	Men's team	Pos	Medal	Age	Men's team	Medal	G	S	B	T	Ref
1	Aleksandr Kabanov	1948	1.81 m (5 ft 11 in)	24, 32	Soviet Union	FP	1972 (gold) , 1980^{*} (gold)	52–56	Russia	2000 (silver) , 2004 (bronze)	2	1	1	4	

== See also ==
- Russia women's Olympic water polo team records and statistics
- Soviet Union men's Olympic water polo team records and statistics
- List of men's Olympic water polo tournament records and statistics
- Lists of Olympic water polo records and statistics
- Russia at the Olympics

== Sources ==
=== Official Reports (IOC) ===
PDF documents in the LA84 Foundation Digital Library:

- Official Report of the 1896 Olympic Games (download, archive)
- Official Report of the 1900 Olympic Games (download, archive)
- Official Report of the 1904 Olympic Games (download, archive)
- Official Report of the 1908 Olympic Games (download, archive) (pp. 359–361)
- Official Report of the 1912 Olympic Games (download, archive) (pp. 1021–1024, 1031–1037)
- Official Report of the 1920 Olympic Games (download, archive) (p. 130)
- Official Report of the 1924 Olympic Games (download, archive) (pp. 439–440, 486–494)
- Official Report of the 1928 Olympic Games (download, archive) (pp. 746–757, 797–807)
- Official Report of the 1932 Olympic Games (download, archive) (pp. 619–623, 646–652)
- Official Report of the 1936 Olympic Games, v.2 (download, archive) (pp. 345–356)
- Official Report of the 1948 Olympic Games (download, archive) (pp. 537–540, 640–647)
- Official Report of the 1952 Olympic Games (download, archive) (pp. 600–608)
- Official Report of the 1956 Olympic Games (download, archive) (pp. 592–594, 624–627)
- Official Report of the 1960 Olympic Games (download, archive) (pp. 552–555, 617–634)
- Official Report of the 1964 Olympic Games, v.2 (download, archive) (pp. 682–698)
- Official Report of the 1968 Olympic Games, v.3 (download, archive) (pp. 449–466, 811–826)
- Official Report of the 1972 Olympic Games, v.3 (download, archive) (pp. 331, 353–365)
- Official Report of the 1976 Olympic Games, v.3 (download, archive) (pp. 446–447, 484–497)
- Official Report of the 1980 Olympic Games, v.3 (download, archive) (pp. 458, 495–510)
- Official Report of the 1984 Olympic Games, v.2 (download, archive) (pp. 528–534)
- Official Report of the 1988 Olympic Games, v.2 (download, archive) (pp. 590–598)
- Official Report of the 1992 Olympic Games, v.5 (download, archive) (pp. 354, 386–400)
- Official Report of the 1996 Olympic Games, v.3 (download, archive) (pp. 56–73)

=== Official Results Books (IOC) ===
PDF documents in the LA84 Foundation Digital Library:

- Official Results Book – 2000 Olympic Games – Water Polo (download, archive)
- Official Results Book – 2004 Olympic Games – Water Polo (download, archive)
- Official Results Book – 2008 Olympic Games – Water Polo (download, archive)

PDF documents on the FINA website:

- Official Results Book – 2012 Olympic Games – Diving, Swimming, Synchronised Swimming, Water Polo (archive) (pp. 284–507)

PDF documents in the Olympic World Library:

- Official Results Book – 2016 Olympic Games – Water Polo (archive)

PDF documents on the International Olympic Committee website:

- Official Results Book – 2020 Olympic Games – Water Polo (archive)
- Official Results Book – 2024 Olympic Games – Water Polo

=== Official Reports (FINA) ===
PDF documents on the FINA website:

- HistoFINA – Water polo medalists and statistics (as of September 2019) (archive) (pp. 4–13)
- 1870–2020 | 150 years of Water Polo – Evolution of its rules (archive)

=== Official website (IOC) ===
Water polo on the International Olympic Committee website:

- Water polo
- Men's water polo

=== Olympedia ===
Water polo on the Olympedia website:

- Water polo Archived 2021-12-28 at the Wayback Machine
- Men's water polo
- Athlete count for water polo
- Water polo venues
- Water polo at the 1900 Summer Olympics (men's tournament)
- Water polo at the 1904 Summer Olympics (men's tournament)
- Water polo at the 1908 Summer Olympics (men's tournament)
- Water polo at the 1912 Summer Olympics (men's tournament)
- Water polo at the 1920 Summer Olympics (men's tournament)
- Water polo at the 1924 Summer Olympics (men's tournament)
- Water polo at the 1928 Summer Olympics (men's tournament)
- Water polo at the 1932 Summer Olympics (men's tournament)
- Water polo at the 1936 Summer Olympics (men's tournament)
- Water polo at the 1948 Summer Olympics (men's tournament)
- Water polo at the 1952 Summer Olympics (men's tournament)
- Water polo at the 1956 Summer Olympics (men's tournament)
- Water polo at the 1960 Summer Olympics (men's tournament)
- Water polo at the 1964 Summer Olympics (men's tournament)
- Water polo at the 1968 Summer Olympics (men's tournament)
- Water polo at the 1972 Summer Olympics (men's tournament)
- Water polo at the 1976 Summer Olympics (men's tournament)
- Water polo at the 1980 Summer Olympics (men's tournament)
- Water polo at the 1984 Summer Olympics (men's tournament)
- Water polo at the 1988 Summer Olympics (men's tournament)
- Water polo at the 1992 Summer Olympics (men's tournament)
- Water polo at the 1996 Summer Olympics (men's tournament)
- Water polo at the 2000 Summer Olympics (men's tournament)
- Water polo at the 2004 Summer Olympics (men's tournament)
- Water polo at the 2008 Summer Olympics (men's tournament)
- Water polo at the 2012 Summer Olympics (men's tournament)
- Water polo at the 2016 Summer Olympics (men's tournament)
- Water polo at the 2020 Summer Olympics (men's tournament)

=== Sports Reference ===
Water polo on the Sports Reference website:

- Country Medal Leaders & Athlete Medal Leaders (1900–2016) (archived)
- Men's water polo (1900–2016) (archived)
- Water polo at the 1900 Summer Games (men's tournament) (archived)
- Water polo at the 1904 Summer Games (men's tournament) (archived)
- Water polo at the 1908 Summer Games (men's tournament) (archived)
- Water polo at the 1912 Summer Games (men's tournament) (archived)
- Water polo at the 1920 Summer Games (men's tournament) (archived)
- Water polo at the 1924 Summer Games (men's tournament) (archived)
- Water polo at the 1928 Summer Games (men's tournament) (archived)
- Water polo at the 1932 Summer Games (men's tournament) (archived)
- Water polo at the 1936 Summer Games (men's tournament) (archived)
- Water polo at the 1948 Summer Games (men's tournament) (archived)
- Water polo at the 1952 Summer Games (men's tournament) (archived)
- Water polo at the 1956 Summer Games (men's tournament) (archived)
- Water polo at the 1960 Summer Games (men's tournament) (archived)
- Water polo at the 1964 Summer Games (men's tournament) (archived)
- Water polo at the 1968 Summer Games (men's tournament) (archived)
- Water polo at the 1972 Summer Games (men's tournament) (archived)
- Water polo at the 1976 Summer Games (men's tournament) (archived)
- Water polo at the 1980 Summer Games (men's tournament) (archived)
- Water polo at the 1984 Summer Games (men's tournament) (archived)
- Water polo at the 1988 Summer Games (men's tournament) (archived)
- Water polo at the 1992 Summer Games (men's tournament) (archived)
- Water polo at the 1996 Summer Games (men's tournament) (archived)
- Water polo at the 2000 Summer Games (men's tournament) (archived)
- Water polo at the 2004 Summer Games (men's tournament) (archived)
- Water polo at the 2008 Summer Games (men's tournament) (archived)
- Water polo at the 2012 Summer Games (men's tournament) (archived)
- Water polo at the 2016 Summer Games (men's tournament) (archived)
- Water polo at the 2020 Summer Games (men's tournament) (archived)

=== Todor66 ===
Water polo on the Todor66 website:

- Water polo at the Summer Games
- Water polo at the 1900 Summer Olympics (men's tournament)
- Water polo at the 1904 Summer Olympics (men's tournament)
- Water polo at the 1908 Summer Olympics (men's tournament)
- Water polo at the 1912 Summer Olympics (men's tournament)
- Water polo at the 1920 Summer Olympics (men's tournament)
- Water polo at the 1924 Summer Olympics (men's tournament)
- Water polo at the 1928 Summer Olympics (men's tournament)
- Water polo at the 1932 Summer Olympics (men's tournament)
- Water polo at the 1936 Summer Olympics (men's tournament)
- Water polo at the 1948 Summer Olympics (men's tournament)
- Water polo at the 1952 Summer Olympics (men's tournament)
- Water polo at the 1956 Summer Olympics (men's tournament)
- Water polo at the 1960 Summer Olympics (men's tournament)
- Water polo at the 1964 Summer Olympics (men's tournament)
- Water polo at the 1968 Summer Olympics (men's tournament, men's qualification)
- Water polo at the 1972 Summer Olympics (men's tournament, men's qualification)
- Water polo at the 1976 Summer Olympics (men's tournament, men's European qualification)
- Water polo at the 1980 Summer Olympics (men's tournament, men's European qualification, men's world qualification)
- Water polo at the 1984 Summer Olympics (men's tournament, men's qualification)
- Water polo at the 1988 Summer Olympics (men's tournament, men's qualification)
- Water polo at the 1992 Summer Olympics (men's tournament, men's qualification)
- Water polo at the 1996 Summer Olympics (men's tournament, men's qualification)
- Water polo at the 2000 Summer Olympics (men's tournament, men's qualification)
- Water polo at the 2004 Summer Olympics (men's tournament, men's qualification)
- Water polo at the 2008 Summer Olympics (men's tournament, men's qualification)
- Water polo at the 2012 Summer Olympics (men's tournament, men's qualification)
- Water polo at the 2016 Summer Olympics (men's tournament, men's qualification)
- Water polo at the 2020 Summer Olympics (men's tournament, men's qualification)
- Water polo at the 2024 Summer Olympics (men's tournament, men's qualification)

=== ISHOF ===
International Swimming Hall of Fame (ISHOF) website:

- Honorees Listed by Category – Water Polo
- Honorees Listed by Category – Coaches
- Honorees Listed by Category – Contributors
- Honorees by Country
- Honorees By Last Name
