= Filippos Karampetsos =

Greek water polo player

Personal information
- Born: 22 October 1977 (age 47); Patras, Greece

Sport
- Sport: Water polo

Filippos Karampetsos (born 22 October 1977) is a Greek water polo goalkeeper. At the 2012 Summer Olympics, he competed for the Greece men's national water polo team in the men's event. He is 6 ft 4 inches tall.

== See also ==
- Greece men's Olympic water polo team records and statistics
- List of men's Olympic water polo tournament goalkeepers
