= Dmitri Stratan =

Water polo player

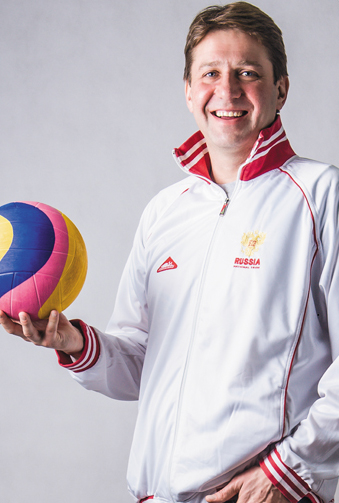
- Stratan in 2013

Personal information
- Born: 24 January 1975 (age 51) Lviv, Ukrainian SSR, Soviet Union
- Height: 1.96 m (6 ft 5 in)
- Weight: 102 kg (225 lb)

Sport
- Sport: Water polo
- Club: Spartak Volgograd, Marseille, Shturm 2002, Chekhov
Medal record
Representing Russia
Olympic Games
Silver medal – second place	2000 Sydney	Team competition
Bronze medal – third place	2004 Athens	Team competition
World Championships
Bronze medal – third place	2001 Fukuoka	Team competition
European Championships
Bronze medal – third place	1997 Seville	Team competition
FINA World Cup
Gold medal – first place	2002 Belgrade	Team competition

Dmitri Ivanovich Stratan (Russian: Дмитрий Иванович Стратан; born 24 January 1975) is a Soviet and Russian water polo forward. He competed in the 1996 Summer Olympics for the Ukrainian team that finished in 12th place. At the next two Olympics he played for Russia and won a silver and bronze medal, respectively. He was also part of the Russian teams that won bronze medals at the 1997 European and 2001 world championships.

Stratan is Moldavian by birth, but in 1997 received Russian citizenship. He was born in Lviv, Ukraine, and graduated from the Institute of Physical Education there. He played for two years in Slovenia, and one year in France, and lived for some time in Lyubertsy, Moscow Oblast, where he played for Shturm 2002. He finally settled in Volgograd, Russia. Stratan is married and has a son Dan and a daughter Dasha.

== See also ==
- List of Olympic medalists in water polo (men)
