= Ioannis Vossos =

Greek water polo player

Personal information
- Born: October 10, 1960 (age 64)

Sport
- Sport: Water polo

Ioannis Vossos (born 10 October 1960) is a Greek former water polo player who competed in the 1980 Summer Olympics and in the 1984 Summer Olympics. He played for Ethnikos Piraeus.

== See also ==
- Greece men's Olympic water polo team records and statistics
- List of men's Olympic water polo tournament goalkeepers
