= Christos Afroudakis =

Greek water polo player

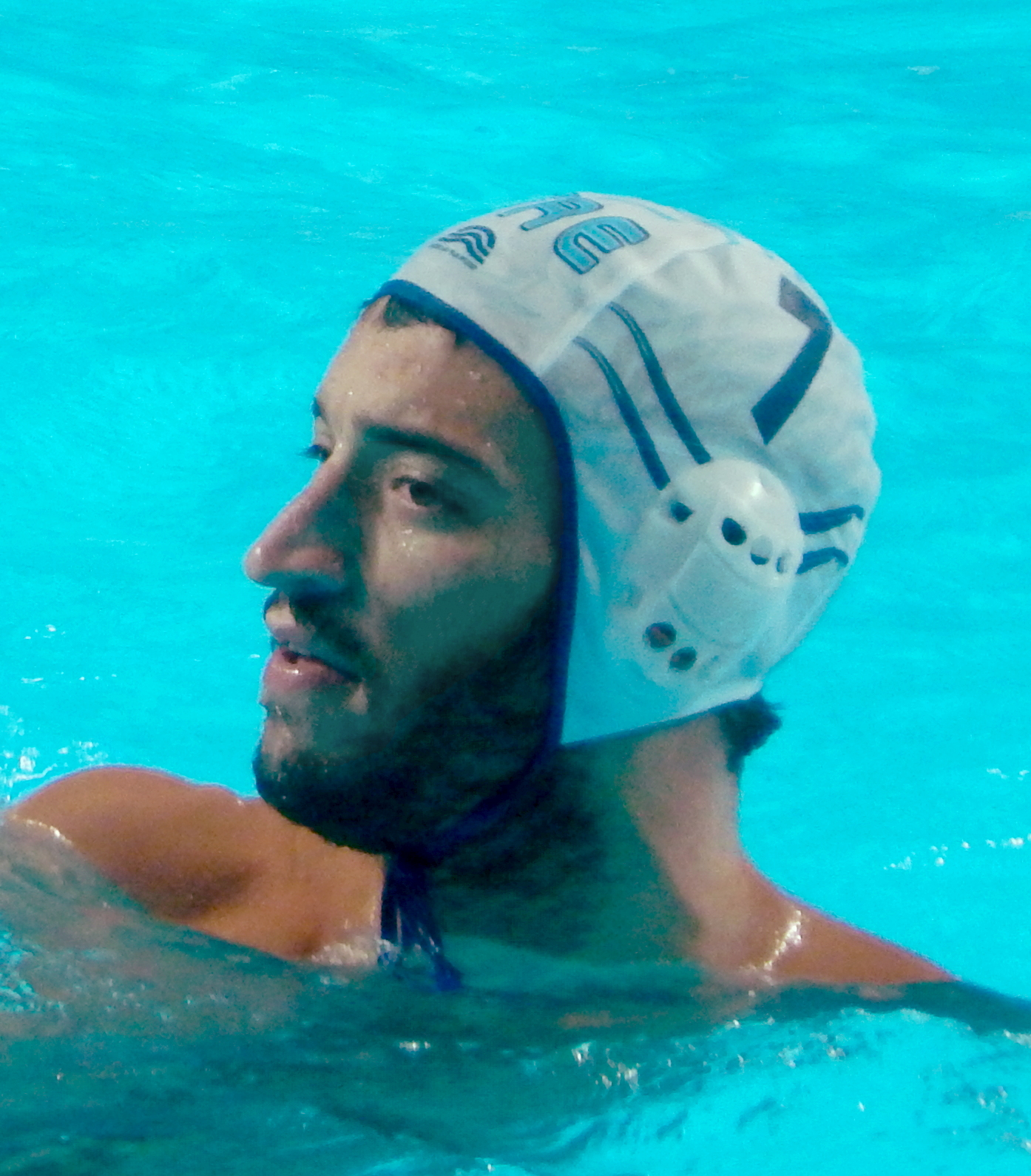

Personal information
- Born: 23 May 1984 (age 42) Greece
- Height: 188 cm (6 ft 2 in)
- Weight: 88 kg (194 lb)
Medal record
Men's water polo
Representing Greece
World Championships
| Bronze medal – third place | 2005 Montreal | Team |
| Bronze medal – third place | 2015 Kazan | Team |
FINA World League
| Bronze medal – third place | 2016 Huizhou | Team |
Mediterranean Games
| Bronze medal – third place | 2013 Mersin | Team |
- Updated on 13 January 2017

Christos Afroudakis (born 23 May 1984) is a Greek water polo player who competed in the 2004 Summer Olympics, the 2008 Summer Olympics, and the 2012 Summer Olympics.

He was the captain of the team that competed for Greece at the 2016 Summer Olympics. They finished in 6th place.

His brother Georgios also competed for Greece at the Olympic level in water polo.

Afroudakis retired from the Greek Men's National Team after the 2016 Summer Olympics.

== Clubs ==
- NC Vouliagmeni: 2002–2004
- CN Posillipo: 2004–2006
- Ethnikos Piraeus: 2006–2007
- Olympiacos: 2007–2011
- NC Vouliagmeni: 2011–2021

== See also ==
- Greece men's Olympic water polo team records and statistics
- List of players who have appeared in multiple men's Olympic water polo tournaments
- List of World Aquatics Championships medalists in water polo
