= Peter Montgomery (water polo) =

Australian water polo player

Personal information
- Born: July 6, 1950 (age 75) Sydney, Australia

Sport
- Sport: Water polo

Peter Guy Montgomery, AM (born 6 July 1950) is an Australian sports administrator and former water polo player, who competed at four Olympics from 1972 to 1984 and has been the Vice President of the Australian Olympic Committee since 2001.

== Biography ==
Montgomery was born on 6 July 1950 and grew up on the Northern Beaches of Sydney. He attended Narrabeen Boys' High School, where he began playing water polo, and graduated from the Sydney Law School with a Bachelor of Laws in 1972; he has been a solicitor at the Supreme Court of New South Wales since then.

He competed in the Australian water polo team at the 1972 Munich, 1976 Montreal, 1980 Moscow, and 1984 Los Angeles Summer Olympics (the last of which he captained). He represented Australia in the sport on 441 occasions and, since his retirement from water polo in 1984, has served as a sports administrator on national and international committees related to water polo and the Olympic movement. Montgomery became president of the Australian Olympic Committee Athletes' Commission in 1984. He has been Vice President of the Australian Olympic Committee since 2001, was a member of the International Olympic Committee Athletes' Commission from 1988 to 1999, and has served as Treasurer, Vice President and Patron of Australian Water Polo since its founding in 1982. Montgomery was the inaugural President of the World Olympians Association, a position he held between 1995 and 1999. In 1995, Montgomery was part of the first members of the International Council of Arbitration for Sport.

== Recognition ==
Montgomery received a Medal of the Order of Australia in 1986 and was promoted to membership status in 2006. At the 2002 Salt Lake City Winter Olympics, he received an Olympic Order. He was inducted into the Water Polo Australia Hall of Fame and the Sport Australia Hall of Fame in 2009 and the International Swimming Hall of Fame in 2013. The swimming pool at the University of Sydney aquatic centre is named after him.

== See also ==
- Australia men's Olympic water polo team records and statistics
- List of players who have appeared in multiple men's Olympic water polo tournaments
- List of members of the International Swimming Hall of Fame
