= Nikolay Kozlov =

Russian water polo player

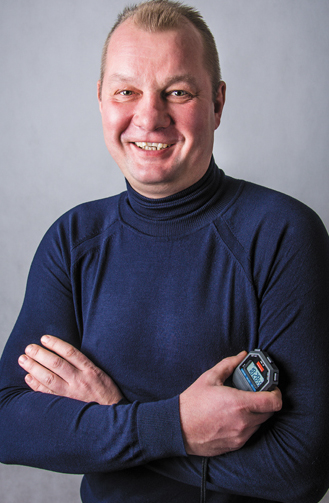
- Kozlov in 2013

Personal information
- Born: 21 July 1972 (age 53) Shcherbinka, Soviet Union
- Height: 192 cm (6 ft 4 in)
- Weight: 92 kg (203 lb)

Sport
- Sport: Water polo
- Club: Spartak Volgograd
Medal record
Representing the Unified Team
Olympic Games
| Bronze medal – third place | 1992 Barcelona | Team competition |
Representing Russia
Olympic Games
| Silver medal – second place | 2000 Sydney | Team competition |
| Bronze medal – third place | 2004 Athens | Team competition |
World Championships
| Bronze medal – third place | 2001 Fukuoka | Team Competition |
FINA World Cup
| Gold medal – first place | 2002 Belgrade | Team competition |

Nikolay Nikolaevich Kozlov (Russian: Николай Николаевич Козлов; born 21 July 1972) is a retired Russian water polo player. He competed at the 1992, 1996, 2000 and 2004 Olympics and won one silver and two bronze medals.

== See also ==
- Russia men's Olympic water polo team records and statistics
- List of Olympic medalists in water polo (men)
- List of players who have appeared in multiple men's Olympic water polo tournaments
- List of World Aquatics Championships medalists in water polo
