= Evangelos Patras =

Greek water polo player

Personal information
- Nickname: Vangelis
- Born: 17 October 1968 (age 57) Agria
- Height: 188 cm (6 ft 2 in)
- Weight: 183 lb (83 kg)

Sport
- Sport: Water Polo
- Club: Nautikos Omilos Volou & Argonauts (1982-1986); Ethnikos Piraeus (1986-1996); NO Halkidas (1996-2001); Panathinaikos (2001-2003); Ydraikos NO (2010)
Medal record
Men's water polo
Representing Greece
World Cup
Silver medal – second place	1997 Athens	Team
Balkan Championships
Silver medal – second place	1986	Team

Evangelos Patras (Greek: Βαγγέλης Πάτρας; born 17 October 1968, in Agria) is a Greek former water polo player who competed in the 1988 Summer Olympics, in the 1992 Summer Olympics, and in the 1996 Summer Olympics.

== Personal ==
His daughter Maria is an international waterpolo player.

== Honours ==
- Greek Championship: 1988, 1994
- Greek Cup: 1988, 1991

== See also ==
- Greece men's Olympic water polo team records and statistics
- List of men's Olympic water polo tournament goalkeepers
