= Sergey Garbuzov =

Russian water polo player

Personal information
- Born: 13 January 1974 (age 52) Moscow, Soviet Union

Sport
- Sport: Water polo
Medal record
Representing Russia
Olympic Games
Silver medal – second place	2000 Sydney	Team competition
Bronze medal – third place	2004 Athens	Team competition
World Championships
Bronze medal – third place	1994 Rome	Team competition
Bronze medal – third place	2001 Fukuoka	Team competition
FINA World Cup
Gold medal – first place	2002 Belgrade	Team competition

Sergey Garbuzov (born 13 January 1974) is a retired Russian water polo player who played on the silver medal squad at the 2000 Summer Olympics and the bronze medal squad at the 2004 Summer Olympics.

== See also ==
- Russia men's Olympic water polo team records and statistics
- List of Olympic medalists in water polo (men)
- List of World Aquatics Championships medalists in water polo
