= Stavros Giannopoulos =

Greek water polo player

Personal information
- Born: July 12, 1961 (age 63)

Sport
- Sport: Water polo

Stavros Giannopoulos (born 12 July 1961) is a Greek former water polo player who competed in the 1984 Summer Olympics.

== See also ==
- Greece men's Olympic water polo team records and statistics
- List of men's Olympic water polo tournament goalkeepers
