= Nikolay Maksimov =

Russian water polo player

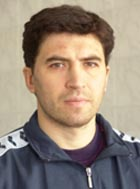

Personal information
- Born: 15 November 1972 (age 53) Moscow, Soviet Union
- Height: 1.90 m (6 ft 3 in)
- Weight: 93 kg (205 lb)

Sport
- Sport: Water polo
- Club: Dynamo Moscow (1990–2000); CN Sabadell (2000–2003); Spartak Volgograd (2003–2005); Sintez Kazan (2005–)
Medal record
Representing Russia
Olympic Games
| Silver medal – second place | 2000 Sydney | Team competition |
| Bronze medal – third place | 2004 Athens | Team competition |
World Championships
| Bronze medal – third place | 1994 Rome | Team competition |
FINA World Cup
| Gold medal – first place | 2002 Belgrade | Team competition |
| Bronze medal – third place | 1995 Atlanta | Team competition |
European Championships
| Bronze medal – third place | 1997 Seville | Team competition |

Nikolay Mikhaylovich Maksimov (Russian: Николай Михайлович Максимов; born 15 November 1972) is a Russian water polo goalkeeper, who played at the 1996 Summer Olympics, on the silver medal squad at the 2000 Summer Olympics and the bronze medal squad at the 2004 Summer Olympics. He was the top goalkeeper at the 2004 Olympics, with 67 saves. He competed as part of the Kazakhstan National Team at the 2012 Summer Olympics. Before his Olympic career, he won bronze medals at the world championships in 1994 and European championships in 1997.

He graduated from the Moscow Institute of Pedagogy.

== See also ==
- Russia men's Olympic water polo team records and statistics
- Kazakhstan men's Olympic water polo team records and statistics
- List of Olympic medalists in water polo (men)
- List of players who have appeared in multiple men's Olympic water polo tournaments
- List of men's Olympic water polo tournament goalkeepers
- List of World Aquatics Championships medalists in water polo
