= List of players who have appeared in multiple men's Olympic water polo tournaments =

This is a list of male players who have been named in the national water polo team squad in at least three or four Olympic tournaments since the inaugural official edition in 1900.

== Abbreviations ==
Apps	Appearances	Rk	Rank	Ref	Reference	ISHOF	International Swimming Hall of Fame
Pos	Playing position	FP	Field player	GK	Goalkeeper		
(C)	Captain	p.	page	pp.	pages		

== Overall multi-time Olympians ==
As of the 2020 Summer Olympics, 87 male players have been named in the national water polo team squad in four or more men's Olympic tournaments.

=== By tournament ===
The following table is pre-sorted by edition of the Olympics (in ascending order), name of the team (in ascending order), name of the player (in ascending order), respectively. Last updated: 27 July 2021.

Legend

- Team^{*} – Host team

Year	Total	Six-time Olympian		Five-time Olympian		Four-time Olympian	
1900	0	—	0	—	0	—	0
1908	0	—	0	—	0	—	0
1912	0	—	0	—	0	—	0
1920	0	—	0	—	0	—	0
1924	3	—	0	—	0	Belgium: Joseph Pletincx; Great Britain: Paul Radmilovic, Charles Smith (GK)	3
1928	1	—	0	Great Britain: Paul Radmilovic	1	—	0
1932	0	—	0	—	0	—	0
1936	4	—	0	—	0	Belgium: Gérard Blitz; France: Henri Padou; Hungary: Márton Homonnai; United States: Wally O'Connor	4
1948	0	—	0	—	0	—	0
1952	0	—	0	—	0	—	0
1956	0	—	0	—	0	—	0
1960	2	—	0	—	0	Hungary: Dezső Gyarmati, László Jeney (GK)	2
1964	2	—	0	Hungary: Dezső Gyarmati	1	Hungary: György Kárpáti	1
1968	1	—	0	—	0	Hungary: Mihály Mayer	1
1972	4	—	0	—	0	Hungary: András Bodnár; Italy: Franco Lavoratori, Eraldo Pizzo; Yugoslavia: Mirko Sandić	4
Year	Total	Six-time Olympian		Five-time Olympian		Four-time Olympian	
1976	1	—	0	—	0	Yugoslavia: Ozren Bonačić	1
1980	6	—	0	—	0	Cuba: Oscar Periche (GK); Hungary: Endre Molnár (GK), István Szívós Jr. Italy: Alberto Alberani (GK), Gianni De Magistris; Soviet Union^{*}: Aleksei Barkalov	6
1984	3	—	0	Italy: Gianni De Magistris	1	Australia: Peter Montgomery; Netherlands: Ton Buunk	2
1988	2	—	0	—	0	Australia: Andrew Kerr; West Germany: Armando Fernández	2
1992	3	—	0	—	0	Germany: Peter Röhle (GK); Greece: Kyriakos Giannopoulos; Spain^{*}: Manuel Estiarte	3
1996	4	—	0	Spain: Manuel Estiarte	1	Greece: George Mavrotas, Anastasios Papanastasiou; Spain: Jordi Sans	3
2000	7	Spain: Manuel Estiarte	1	Greece: George Mavrotas; Spain: Jordi Sans	2	Greece: Filippos Kaiafas; Spain: Pedro García, Salvador Gómez, Jesús Rollán (GK)	4
2004	10	—	0	Spain: Salvador Gómez, Jesús Rollán (GK)	2	Croatia: Dubravko Šimenc; Greece^{*}: Konstantinos Loudis; Hungary: Tibor Benedek; Italy: Carlo Silipo; Russia: Dmitry Gorshkov, Nikolay Kozlov; Spain: Daniel Ballart, Sergi Pedrerol	8
Year	Total	Six-time Olympian		Five-time Olympian		Four-time Olympian	
2008	11	—	0	Hungary: Tibor Benedek	1	Croatia: Igor Hinić; Greece: Georgios Afroudakis; Hungary: Tamás Kásás; Italy: Alberto Angelini, Fabio Bencivenga, Alessandro Calcaterra; Serbia: Aleksandar Šapić, Dejan Savić, Vladimir Vujasinović; Spain: Ángel Andreo (GK)	10
2012	17	—	0	Croatia: Igor Hinić; Greece: Georgios Afroudakis; Hungary: Tamás Kásás	3	Australia: Thomas Whalan, Gavin Woods; Croatia: Samir Barać, Frano Vićan (GK); Greece: Theodoros Chatzitheodorou, Nikolaos Deligiannis (GK); Hungary: Péter Biros, Gergely Kiss, Zoltán Szécsi (GK); Italy: Stefano Tempesti (GK); Kazakhstan: Nikolay Maksimov (GK); Spain: Iván Pérez; United States: Tony Azevedo, Ryan Bailey	14
2016	9	—	0	Italy: Stefano Tempesti (GK); United States: Tony Azevedo	2	Croatia: Damir Burić, Xavier García; Greece: Christos Afroudakis; Italy: Pietro Figlioli; Montenegro: Predrag Jokić; Spain: Guillermo Molina; United States: Jesse Smith	7
2020	15	—	0	Croatia: Xavier García; Italy: Pietro Figlioli; United States: Jesse Smith	3	Australia: Richie Campbell, Rhys Howden; Croatia: Andro Bušlje, Maro Joković; Hungary: Norbert Hosnyánszky, Dénes Varga; Montenegro: Draško Brguljan, Aleksandar Ivović; Serbia: Filip Filipović, Duško Pijetlović, Andrija Prlainović; Spain: Felipe Perrone	12
Year	Total	Six-time Olympian		Five-time Olympian		Four-time Olympian	

=== By confederation ===
Last updated: 27 July 2021.

Confederation	Number of multi-time Olympians			
Confederation	Six-time	Five-time	Four-time	Total
Africa – CANA	0	0	0	0
Americas – UANA	0	2	3	5
Asia – AASF	0	0	1	1
Europe – LEN	1	14	60	75
Oceania – OSA	0	0	6	6
Total	1	16	70	87

=== By team ===
Last updated: 27 July 2021.

Legend

- Team^{†} – Defunct team

Men's team	Number of multi-time Olympians				Confederation
Men's team	Six-time	Five-time	Four-time	Total	Confederation
Australia	0	0	6	6	Oceania – OSA
Belgium	0	0	2	2	Europe – LEN
Croatia	0	2	6	8	Europe – LEN
Cuba	0	0	1	1	Americas – UANA
France	0	0	1	1	Europe – LEN
Germany	0	0	1	1	Europe – LEN
Great Britain	0	1	1	2	Europe – LEN
Greece	0	2	7	9	Europe – LEN
Hungary	0	3	12	15	Europe – LEN
Italy	0	3	7	10	Europe – LEN
Kazakhstan	0	0	1	1	Asia – AASF
Montenegro	0	0	3	3	Europe – LEN
Netherlands	0	0	1	1	Europe – LEN
Russia	0	0	2	2	Europe – LEN
Serbia	0	0	6	6	Europe – LEN
Soviet Union^{†}	0	0	1	1	Europe – LEN
Spain	1	3	7	11	Europe – LEN
United States	0	2	2	4	Americas – UANA
West Germany^{†}	0	0	1	1	Europe – LEN
Yugoslavia^{†}	0	0	2	2	Europe – LEN
Total	1	16	70	87	

=== By position ===
Last updated: 27 July 2021.

Position	Number of multi-time Olympians			
Position	Six-time	Five-time	Four-time	Total
Field player	1	14	59	74
Goalkeeper	0	2	11	13
Total	1	16	70	87

=== Five-time Olympians ===
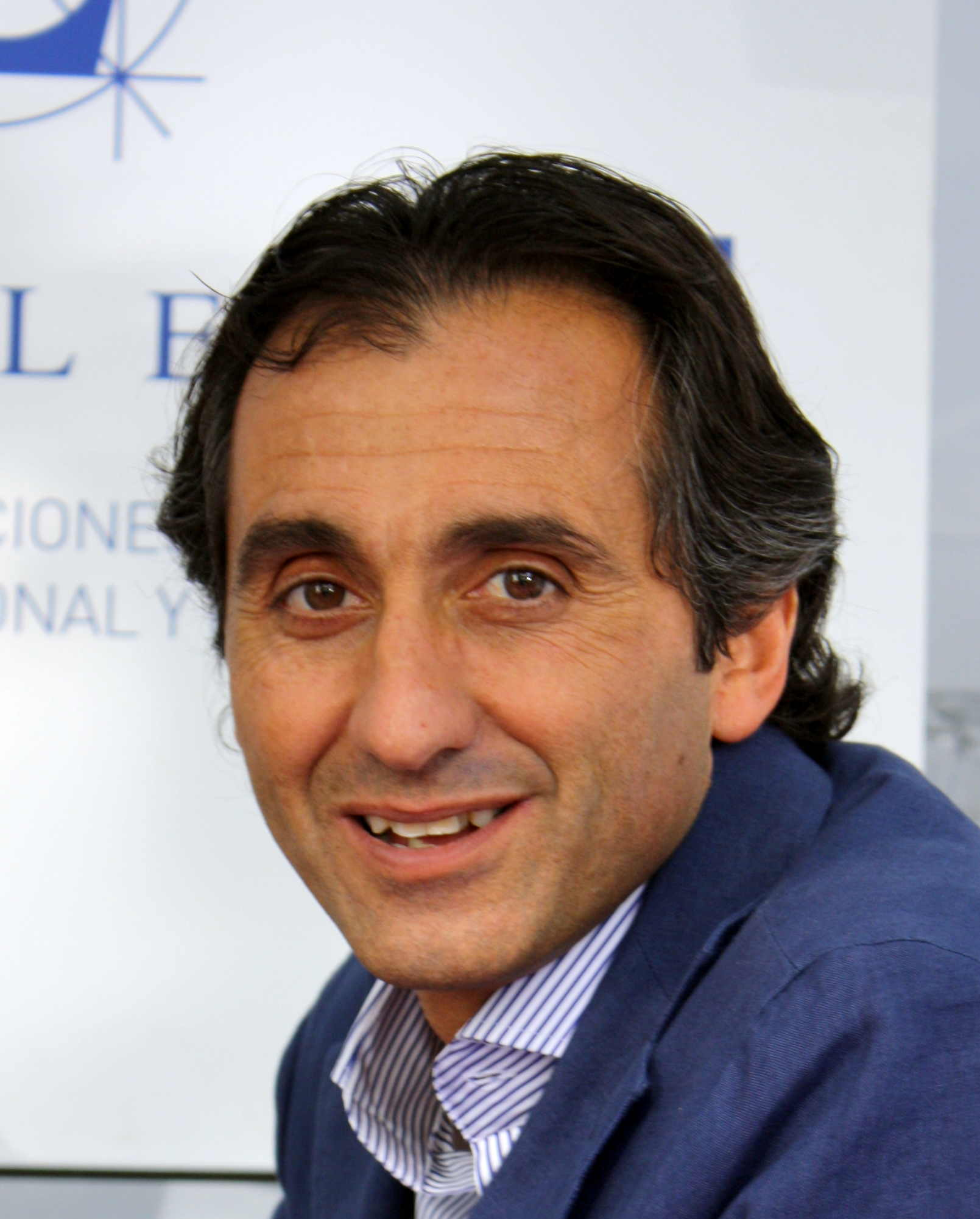
Manuel Estiarte of Spain is the only water polo player to compete at six Olympic Games (1980–2000).

The following table is pre-sorted by number of Olympic appearances (in descending order), year of the last Olympic appearance (in ascending order), year of the first Olympic appearance (in ascending order), date of birth (in ascending order), name of the player (in ascending order), respectively. Last updated: 26 July 2021.

Seventeen athletes competed in water polo at five or more Olympic Games between 1900 and 2020 inclusive. Paul Radmilovic, representing Great Britain, is the first water polo player to compete at five Olympics (1908–1928).

Four players (Manuel Estiarte, Salvador Gómez, Jesús Rollán and Jordi Sans) were all members of the Spain men's national water polo team (1988–2000). Manuel Estiarte is the first and only water polo player (man or woman) to compete at six Olympics (1980–2000). Jesús Rollán is the first water polo goalkeeper of either gender to compete at five Olympics (1984–2004).

Tony Azevedo of the United States is the first non-European water polo player to compete at five Olympic Games (2000–2016).

Italian goalkeeper Stefano Tempesti competed at five Olympics between 2000 and 2016.

Legend and abbreviation

- – Hosts
- Apps – Appearances

Male athletes who competed in water polo at five or more Olympics
Apps	Player	Birth	Height	Men's team	Pos	Water polo tournaments						Period (age of first/last)	Medals				Ref
Apps	Player	Birth	Height	Men's team	Pos	1	2	3	4	5	6	Period (age of first/last)	G	S	B	T	Ref
6	Manuel Estiarte	1961	1.78 m (5 ft 10 in)	Spain	FP	1980	1984	1988	1992	1996	2000	20 years (18/38)	1	1	0	2	
5	Paul Radmilovic	1886	1.80 m (5 ft 11 in)	Great Britain	FP	1908	1912	1920	1924	1928		20 years (22/42)	3	0	0	3	
5	Dezső Gyarmati	1927	1.86 m (6 ft 1 in)	Hungary	FP	1948	1952	1956	1960	1964		16 years (20/36)	3	1	1	5	
5	Gianni De Magistris	1950	1.85 m (6 ft 1 in)	Italy	FP	1968	1972	1976	1980	1984		16 years (17/33)	0	1	0	1	
5	Jordi Sans	1965	1.80 m (5 ft 11 in)	Spain	FP	1984	1988	1992	1996	2000		16 years (18/35)	1	1	0	2	
5	George Mavrotas	1967	1.75 m (5 ft 9 in)	Greece	FP	1984	1988	1992	1996	2000		16 years (17/33)	0	0	0	0	
5	Salvador Gómez	1968	1.94 m (6 ft 4 in)	Spain	FP	1988	1992	1996	2000	2004		16 years (20/36)	1	1	0	2	
5	Jesús Rollán	1968	1.87 m (6 ft 2 in)	Spain	GK	1988	1992	1996	2000	2004		16 years (20/36)	1	1	0	2	
5	Tibor Benedek	1972	1.90 m (6 ft 3 in)	Hungary	FP	1992	1996	2000	2004	2008		16 years (20/36)	3	0	0	3	
5	Igor Hinić	1975	2.02 m (6 ft 8 in)	Croatia	FP	1996	2000	2004	2008	2012		16 years (20/36)	1	1	0	2	
5	Tamás Kásás	1976	2.00 m (6 ft 7 in)	Hungary	FP	1996	2000	2004	2008	2012		16 years (20/36)	3	0	0	3	
5	Georgios Afroudakis	1976	1.94 m (6 ft 4 in)	Greece	FP	1996	2000	2004	2008	2012		16 years (19/35)	0	0	0	0	
5	Stefano Tempesti	1979	2.05 m (6 ft 9 in)	Italy	GK	2000	2004	2008	2012	2016		16 years (21/37)	0	1	1	2	
5	Tony Azevedo	1981	1.85 m (6 ft 1 in)	United States	FP	2000	2004	2008	2012	2016		16 years (18/34)	0	1	0	1	
5	Jesse Smith	1983	1.93 m (6 ft 4 in)	United States	FP	2004	2008	2012	2016	2020		17 years (21/38)	0	1	0	1	
5	Xavier García	1984	1.98 m (6 ft 6 in)	Spain	FP	2004	2008	2012				17 years (20/37)	0	1	0	1	
5	Xavier García	1984	1.98 m (6 ft 6 in)	Croatia	FP				2016	2020		17 years (20/37)	0	1	0	1	
5	Pietro Figlioli	1984	1.91 m (6 ft 3 in)	Australia	FP	2004	2008					17 years (20/37)	0	1	1	2	
5	Pietro Figlioli	1984	1.91 m (6 ft 3 in)	Italy	FP			2012	2016	2020		17 years (20/37)	0	1	1	2	
Apps	Player	Birth	Height	Men's team	Pos	1	2	3	4	5	6	Period (age of first/last)	G	S	B	T	Ref
Apps	Player	Birth	Height	Men's team	Pos	Water polo tournaments						Period (age of first/last)	Medals				Ref

== Multi-time Olympians by team ==
The following tables are pre-sorted by number of Olympic appearances (in descending order), year of the last Olympic appearance (in ascending order), year of the first Olympic appearance (in ascending order), date of birth (in ascending order), name of the player (in ascending order), respectively.

Legend

- Year^{*} – As host team
- Team^{†} – Defunct team

=== Argentina ===
- Men's national team: Argentina
- Team appearances: 4 (1928, 1948–1952, 1960)
- As host team: —
- Number of five-time Olympians: 0
- Number of four-time Olympians: 0
- Last updated: 27 July 2021.

=== Australia ===
- Men's national team: Australia
- Team appearances: 17 (1948–1964, 1972–1992, 2000^{*}–2020)
- As host team: 1956^{*}, 2000^{*}

* Number of five-time Olympians: 0

- Number of four-time Olympians: 6
- Last updated: 27 July 2021.

Legend

- – Hosts

Male athletes who competed in water polo at four or more Olympics
Apps	Player	Birth	Pos	Water polo tournaments					Age of first/last	ISHOF member	Note	Ref
Apps	Player	Birth	Pos	1	2	3	4	5	Age of first/last	ISHOF member	Note	Ref
4	Peter Montgomery	1950	FP	1972	1976	1980	1984		22/34	2013		
4	Andrew Kerr	1954	FP	1976	1980	1984	1988		22/34			
4	Gavin Woods	1978	FP	2000	2004	2008	2012		22/34			
4	Thomas Whalan	1980	FP	2000	2004	2008	2012		19/31			
4	Rhys Howden	1987	FP	2008	2012	2016	2020		21/34			
4	Richie Campbell	1987	FP	2008	2012	2016	2020		20/33			

Note:

- Pietro Figlioli is listed in section Italy.

=== Austria ===
- Men's national team: Austria
- Team appearances: 3 (1912, 1936, 1952)
- As host team: —
- Number of four-time Olympians: 0
- Number of three-time Olympians: 0
- Last updated: 27 July 2021.

=== Belgium ===
- Men's national team: Belgium
- Team appearances: 11 (1900, 1908–1928, 1936–1952, 1960–1964)
- As host team: 1920^{*}

* Number of five-time Olympians: 0

- Number of four-time Olympians: 2
- Last updated: 27 July 2021.

Legend

- – Hosts

Male athletes who competed in water polo at four or more Olympics
Apps	Player	Birth	Pos	Water polo tournaments					Age of first/last	ISHOF member	Note	Ref
Apps	Player	Birth	Pos	1	2	3	4	5	Age of first/last	ISHOF member	Note	Ref
4	Joseph Pletincx	1888	FP	1908	1912	1920	1924		20/36	1988		
4	Gérard Blitz	1901	FP	1920	1924	1928		1936	19/35	1990		

=== Brazil ===
- Men's national team: Brazil
- Team appearances: 8 (1920, 1932, 1952, 1960–1968, 1984, 2016^{*})
- As host team: 2016^{*}

* Number of four-time Olympians: 0

- Number of three-time Olympians: 3
- Last updated: 27 July 2021.

Legend and abbreviation

- – Hosts
- BRA – Brazil
- SRB – Serbia

Male athletes who competed in water polo at three or more Olympics
Apps	Player	Birth	Pos	Water polo tournaments					Age of first/last	ISHOF member	Note	Ref
Apps	Player	Birth	Pos	1	2	3	4	5	Age of first/last	ISHOF member	Note	Ref
3	Márvio dos Santos	1934	FP	1952		1960	1964		18/30			
3	João Gonçalves	1934	FP	1960	1964	1968			25/33			
3	Slobodan Soro	1978	GK	2008; SRB	2012; SRB	2016; BRA			29/37			

=== Bulgaria ===
- Men's national team: Bulgaria
- Team appearances: 2 (1972, 1980)
- As host team: —
- Number of four-time Olympians: 0
- Number of three-time Olympians: 0
- Last updated: 27 July 2021.

=== Canada ===
- Men's national team: Canada
- Team appearances: 4 (1972–1976^{*}, 1984, 2008)
- As host team: 1976^{*}

* Number of four-time Olympians: 0

- Number of three-time Olympians: 0
- Last updated: 27 July 2021.

=== Chile ===
- Men's national team: Chile
- Team appearances: 1 (1948)
- As host team: —
- Number of four-time Olympians: 0
- Number of three-time Olympians: 0
- Last updated: 27 July 2021.

=== China ===
- Men's national team: China
- Team appearances: 3 (1984–1988, 2008^{*})
- As host team: 2008^{*}
- Number of four-time Olympians: 0
- Number of three-time Olympians: 0
- Last updated: 27 July 2021.

=== Croatia ===
- Men's national team: Croatia
- Team appearances: 7 (1996–2020)
- As host team: —
- Related team: Yugoslavia^{†}

* Number of six-time Olympians: 0

- Number of five-time Olympians: 2
- Number of four-time Olympians: 6
- Last updated: 27 July 2021.

Abbreviation

- CRO – Croatia
- ESP – Spain
- YUG – Yugoslavia

Male athletes who competed in water polo at four or more Olympics
Apps	Player	Birth	Pos	Water polo tournaments					Age of first/last	ISHOF member	Note	Ref
Apps	Player	Birth	Pos	1	2	3	4	5	Age of first/last	ISHOF member	Note	Ref
5	Igor Hinić	1975	FP	1996	2000	2004	2008	2012	20/36			
5	Xavier García	1984	FP	2004; ESP	2008; ESP	2012; ESP	2016; CRO	2020	20/37			
4	Dubravko Šimenc	1966	FP	1988; YUG		1996; CRO	2000; CRO	2004; CRO	21/37		Flag bearer for Croatia (2004)	
4	Samir Barać	1973	FP	2000	2004	2008	2012		26/38			
4	Frano Vićan	1976	GK	2000	2004	2008	2012		24/36			
4	Damir Burić	1980	FP	2004	2008	2012	2016		23/35			
4	Andro Bušlje	1986	FP	2008	2012	2016	2020		22/35		Flag bearer for Croatia (2020)	
4	Maro Joković	1987	FP	2008	2012	2016	2020		20/33			

=== Cuba ===
- Men's national team: Cuba
- Team appearances: 5 (1968–1980, 1992)
- As host team: —
- Number of five-time Olympians: 0
- Number of four-time Olympians: 1
- Last updated: 27 July 2021.

Male athletes who competed in water polo at four or more Olympics
Apps	Player	Birth	Pos	Water polo tournaments					Age of first/last	ISHOF member	Note	Ref
Apps	Player	Birth	Pos	1	2	3	4	5	Age of first/last	ISHOF member	Note	Ref
4	Oscar Periche	1949	GK	1968	1972	1976	1980		18/30			

Note:

- Iván Pérez is listed in section Spain.

=== Czechoslovakia ===
- Men's national team: Czechoslovakia^{†}
- Team appearances: 5 (1920–1928, 1936, 1992)
- As host team: —
- Related team: Slovakia
- Number of five-time Olympians: 0
- Number of four-time Olympians: 0
- Last updated: 27 July 2021.

=== East Germany ===
- Men's national team: East Germany^{†}
- Team appearances: 1 (1968)
- As host team: —
- Related teams: Germany, United Team of Germany^{†}
- Number of four-time Olympians: 0
- Number of three-time Olympians: 0
- Last updated: 27 July 2021.

=== Egypt ===
- Men's national team: Egypt
- Team appearances: 6 (1948–1952, 1960–1968, 2004)
- As host team: —

* Number of four-time Olympians: 0

- Number of three-time Olympians: 2
- Last updated: 27 July 2021.

Male athletes who competed in water polo at three or more Olympics
Apps	Player	Birth	Pos	Water polo tournaments					Age of first/last	ISHOF member	Note	Ref
Apps	Player	Birth	Pos	1	2	3	4	5	Age of first/last	ISHOF member	Note	Ref
3	Abdel Aziz Khalifa	1925	FP	1948	1952		1960		22–23/34–35			
3	Dorri El-Said	1927	FP	1948	1952		1960		21/33			

=== France ===
- Men's national team: France
- Team appearances: 11 (1900^{*}, 1912–1928, 1936–1948, 1960, 1988–1992, 2016)
- As host team: 1900^{*}, 1924^{*}

* Number of five-time Olympians: 0

- Number of four-time Olympians: 1
- Last updated: 27 July 2021.

Legend

- – Hosts

Male athletes who competed in water polo at four or more Olympics
Apps	Player	Birth	Pos	Water polo tournaments					Age of first/last	ISHOF member	Note	Ref
Apps	Player	Birth	Pos	1	2	3	4	5	Age of first/last	ISHOF member	Note	Ref
4	Henri Padou	1898	FP	1920	1924	1928		1936	22/38	1970		

=== Germany ===
- Men's national team: Germany
- Team appearances: 9 (1900, 1928–1936^{*}, 1952, 1992–1996, 2004–2008)
- As host team: 1936^{*}
- Related teams: United Team of Germany^{†}, East Germany^{†}, West Germany^{†}
- Number of five-time Olympians: 0
- Number of four-time Olympians: 1
- Last updated: 8 March 2021.

Legend and abbreviation

- – Hosts
- FRG – West Germany
- GER – Germany

Male athletes who competed in water polo at four or more Olympics
Apps	Player	Birth	Pos	Water polo tournaments					Age of first/last	ISHOF member	Note	Ref
Apps	Player	Birth	Pos	1	2	3	4	5	Age of first/last	ISHOF member	Note	Ref
4	Peter Röhle	1957	GK	1976; FRG		1984; FRG	1988; FRG	1992; GER	19/35			

=== Great Britain ===
- Men's national team: Great Britain
- Team appearances: 11 (1900, 1908^{*}–1928, 1936–1956, 2012^{*})
- As host team: 1908^{*}, 1948^{*}, 2012^{*}

* Number of six-time Olympians: 0

- Number of five-time Olympians: 1
- Number of four-time Olympians: 1
- Last updated: 27 July 2021.

Legend

- – Hosts

Male athletes who competed in water polo at four or more Olympics
Apps	Player	Birth	Pos	Water polo tournaments					Age of first/last	ISHOF member	Note	Ref
Apps	Player	Birth	Pos	1	2	3	4	5	Age of first/last	ISHOF member	Note	Ref
5	Paul Radmilovic	1886	FP	1908	1912	1920	1924	1928	22/42	1967		
4	Charles Smith	1879	GK	1908	1912	1920	1924		29/45	1981	Flag bearer for Great Britain (1912)	

=== Greece ===
- Men's national team: Greece
- Team appearances: 16 (1920–1924, 1948, 1968–1972, 1980–2020)
- As host team: 2004^{*}

* Number of six-time Olympians: 0

- Number of five-time Olympians: 2
- Number of four-time Olympians: 7
- Last updated: 27 July 2021.

Legend

- – Hosts

Male athletes who competed in water polo at four or more Olympics
Apps	Player	Birth	Pos	Water polo tournaments					Age of first/last	ISHOF member	Note	Ref
Apps	Player	Birth	Pos	1	2	3	4	5	Age of first/last	ISHOF member	Note	Ref
5	George Mavrotas	1967	FP	1984	1988	1992	1996	2000	17/33			
5	Georgios Afroudakis	1976	FP	1996	2000	2004	2008	2012	19/35			
4	Kyriakos Giannopoulos	1959	FP	1980	1984	1988	1992		21/33			
4	Anastasios Papanastasiou	1964	FP	1984	1988	1992	1996		20/32			
4	Filippos Kaiafas	1968	FP	1988	1992	1996	2000		20/32			
4	Konstantinos Loudis	1969	FP	1992	1996	2000	2004		23/35			
4	Theodoros Chatzitheodorou	1976	FP	1996	2000	2004		2012	19/35			
4	Nikolaos Deligiannis	1976	GK	2000	2004	2008	2012		24/35			
4	Christos Afroudakis	1984	FP	2004	2008	2012	2016		20/32			

=== Hungary ===
- Men's national team: Hungary
- Team appearances: 23 (1912, 1924–1980, 1988–2020)
- As host team: —

* Number of six-time Olympians: 0

- Number of five-time Olympians: 3
- Number of four-time Olympians: 12
- Last updated: 8 August 2021.

Male athletes who competed in water polo at four or more Olympics
Apps	Player	Birth	Pos	Water polo tournaments					Age of first/last	ISHOF member	Note	Ref
Apps	Player	Birth	Pos	1	2	3	4	5	Age of first/last	ISHOF member	Note	Ref
5	Dezső Gyarmati	1927	FP	1948	1952	1956	1960	1964	20/36	1976		
5	Tibor Benedek	1972	FP	1992	1996	2000	2004	2008	20/36	2016		
5	Tamás Kásás	1976	FP	1996	2000	2004	2008	2012	20/36	2016		
4	Márton Homonnai	1906	FP	1924	1928	1932	1936		18/30	1971		
4	László Jeney	1923	GK	1948	1952	1956	1960		25/37			
4	György Kárpáti	1935	FP	1952	1956	1960	1964		17/29	1982		
4	Mihály Mayer	1933	FP	1956	1960	1964	1968		22/34	1987		
4	András Bodnár	1942	FP	1960	1964	1968	1972		18/30	2017		
4	Endre Molnár	1945	GK	1968	1972	1976	1980		23/35			
4	István Szívós Jr.	1948	FP	1968	1972	1976	1980		20/32	1996		
4	Péter Biros	1976	FP	2000	2004	2008	2012		24/36	2016	Flag bearer for Hungary (2012)	
4	Gergely Kiss	1977	FP	2000	2004	2008	2012		22/34	2016		
4	Zoltán Szécsi	1977	GK	2000	2004	2008	2012		22/34	2016		
4	Norbert Hosnyánszky	1984	FP	2008	2012	2016	2020		24/37			
4	Dénes Varga	1987	FP	2008	2012	2016	2020		21/34			

=== Iceland ===
- Men's national team: Iceland
- Team appearances: 1 (1936)
- As host team: —
- Number of four-time Olympians: 0
- Number of three-time Olympians: 0
- Last updated: 27 July 2021.

=== India ===
- Men's national team: India
- Team appearances: 2 (1948–1952)
- As host team: —
- Number of four-time Olympians: 0
- Number of three-time Olympians: 0
- Last updated: 27 July 2021.

=== Iran ===
- Men's national team: Iran
- Team appearances: 1 (1976)
- As host team: —
- Number of four-time Olympians: 0
- Number of three-time Olympians: 0
- Last updated: 27 July 2021.

=== Republic of Ireland ===
- Men's national team: Ireland
- Team appearances: 2 (1924–1928)
- As host team: —
- Number of four-time Olympians: 0
- Number of three-time Olympians: 0
- Last updated: 27 July 2021.

=== Italy ===
- Men's national team: Italy
- Team appearances: 21 (1920–1924, 1948–2020)
- As host team: 1960^{*}

* Number of six-time Olympians: 0

- Number of five-time Olympians: 3
- Number of four-time Olympians: 7
- Last updated: 27 July 2021.

Legend and abbreviation

- – Hosts
- AUS – Australia
- ITA – Italy

Male athletes who competed in water polo at four or more Olympics
Apps	Player	Birth	Pos	Water polo tournaments					Age of first/last	ISHOF member	Note	Ref
Apps	Player	Birth	Pos	1	2	3	4	5	Age of first/last	ISHOF member	Note	Ref
5	Gianni De Magistris	1950	FP	1968	1972	1976	1980	1984	17/33	1995		
5	Stefano Tempesti	1979	GK	2000	2004	2008	2012	2016	21/37			
5	Pietro Figlioli	1984	FP	2004; AUS	2008; AUS	2012; ITA	2016; ITA	2020; ITA	20/37			
4	Eraldo Pizzo	1938	FP	1960	1964	1968	1972		22/34	1990		
4	Franco Lavoratori	1941	FP	1960	1964	1968	1972		19/31			
4	Alberto Alberani	1947	GK	1968	1972	1976	1980		21/33			
4	Carlo Silipo	1971	FP	1992	1996	2000	2004		20/32	2014		
4	Alberto Angelini	1974	FP	1996	2000	2004	2008		21/33			
4	Alessandro Calcaterra	1975	FP	1996	2000	2004	2008		21/33			
4	Fabio Bencivenga	1976	FP	1996	2000	2004	2008		20/32			

=== Japan ===
- Men's national team: Japan
- Team appearances: 9 (1932–1936, 1960–1972, 1984, 2016–2020)
- As host team: 1964, 2020^{*}

* Number of four-time Olympians: 0

- Number of three-time Olympians: 0
- Last updated: 27 July 2021.

=== Kazakhstan ===
- Men's national team: Kazakhstan
- Team appearances: 4 (2000–2004, 2012, 2020)
- As host team: —
- Related teams: Soviet Union^{†}, Unified Team^{†}

* Number of five-time Olympians: 0

- Number of four-time Olympians: 1
- Last updated: 27 July 2021.

Abbreviation

- KAZ – Kazakhstan
- RUS – Russia

Male athletes who competed in water polo at four or more Olympics
Apps	Player	Birth	Pos	Water polo tournaments					Age of first/last	ISHOF member	Note	Ref
Apps	Player	Birth	Pos	1	2	3	4	5	Age of first/last	ISHOF member	Note	Ref
4	Nikolay Maksimov	1972	GK	1996; RUS	2000; RUS	2004; RUS		2012; KAZ	23/39			

=== Luxembourg ===
- Men's national team: Luxembourg
- Team appearances: 1 (1928)
- As host team: —
- Number of four-time Olympians: 0
- Number of three-time Olympians: 0
- Last updated: 27 July 2021.

=== Malta ===
- Men's national team: Malta
- Team appearances: 2 (1928, 1936)
- As host team: —
- Number of four-time Olympians: 0
- Number of three-time Olympians: 0
- Last updated: 27 July 2021.

=== Mexico ===
- Men's national team: Mexico
- Team appearances: 4 (1952, 1968^{*}–1976)
- As host team: 1968^{*}
- Number of five-time Olympians: 0
- Number of four-time Olympians: 0
- Last updated: 27 July 2021.

Note:

- Armando Fernández is listed in section West Germany.

=== Montenegro ===
- Men's national team: Montenegro
- Team appearances: 4 (2008–2020)
- As host team: —
- Related teams: Yugoslavia^{†}, FR Yugoslavia^{†}, Serbia and Montenegro^{†}

* Number of five-time Olympians: 0

- Number of four-time Olympians: 3
- Last updated: 27 July 2021.

Abbreviation

- MNE – Montenegro
- SCG – Serbia and Montenegro

Male athletes who competed in water polo at four or more Olympics
Apps	Player	Birth	Pos	Water polo tournaments					Age of first/last	ISHOF member	Note	Ref
Apps	Player	Birth	Pos	1	2	3	4	5	Age of first/last	ISHOF member	Note	Ref
4	Predrag Jokić	1983	FP	2004; SCG	2008; MNE	2012; MNE	2016; MNE		21/33		Flag bearer for Montenegro (2016)	
4	Draško Brguljan	1984	FP	2008	2012	2016	2020		23/36		Flag bearer for Montenegro (2020)	
4	Aleksandar Ivović	1986	FP	2008	2012	2016	2020		22/35			

=== Netherlands ===
- Men's national team: Netherlands
- Team appearances: 17 (1908, 1920–1928^{*}, 1936–1952, 1960–1984, 1992–2000)
- As host team: 1928^{*}

* Number of five-time Olympians: 0

- Number of four-time Olympians: 1
- Last updated: 27 July 2021.

Legend

- – Hosts

Male athletes who competed in water polo at four or more Olympics
Apps	Player	Birth	Pos	Water polo tournaments					Age of first/last	ISHOF member	Note	Ref
Apps	Player	Birth	Pos	1	2	3	4	5	Age of first/last	ISHOF member	Note	Ref
4	Ton Buunk	1952	FP	1972	1976	1980	1984		19/31		Flag bearer for the Netherlands (1984)	

=== Portugal ===
- Men's national team: Portugal
- Team appearances: 1 (1952)
- As host team: —
- Number of four-time Olympians: 0
- Number of three-time Olympians: 0
- Last updated: 27 July 2021.

=== Romania ===
- Men's national team: Romania
- Team appearances: 9 (1952–1964, 1972–1980, 1996, 2012)
- As host team: —

* Number of four-time Olympians: 0

- Number of three-time Olympians: 5
- Last updated: 27 July 2021.

Male athletes who competed in water polo at three or more Olympics
Apps	Player	Birth	Pos	Water polo tournaments					Age of first/last	ISHOF member	Note	Ref
Apps	Player	Birth	Pos	1	2	3	4	5	Age of first/last	ISHOF member	Note	Ref
3	Alexandru Szabo	1937	FP	1956	1960	1964			19/27			
3	Aurel Zahan	1938	FP	1956	1960	1964			18/26			
3	Claudiu Rusu	1949	FP	1972	1976	1980			23/31			
3	Dinu Popescu	1949	FP	1972	1976	1980			23/31			
3	Viorel Rus	1952	FP	1972	1976	1980			19/27			

=== Russia ===
- Men's national team: Russia
- Team appearances: 3 (1996–2004)
- As host team: —
- Related teams: Soviet Union^{†}, Unified Team^{†}

* Number of five-time Olympians: 0

- Number of four-time Olympians: 2
- Last updated: 27 July 2021.

Abbreviation

- EUN – Unified Team
- RUS – Russia

Male athletes who competed in water polo at four or more Olympics
Apps	Player	Birth	Pos	Water polo tournaments					Age of first/last	ISHOF member	Note	Ref
Apps	Player	Birth	Pos	1	2	3	4	5	Age of first/last	ISHOF member	Note	Ref
4	Dmitry Gorshkov	1967	FP	1992; EUN	1996; RUS	2000; RUS	2004; RUS		25/37			
4	Nikolay Kozlov	1972	FP	1992; EUN	1996; RUS	2000; RUS	2004; RUS		20/32			

Note:

- Nikolay Maksimov is listed in section Kazakhstan.

=== Serbia ===
- Men's national team: Serbia
- Team appearances: 6 (2008–2024)
- As host team: —
- Related teams: Yugoslavia^{†}, FR Yugoslavia^{†}, Serbia and Montenegro^{†}

* Number of five-time Olympians: 0

- Number of four-time Olympians: 7
- Last updated: 8 August 2021.

Abbreviation

- FRY – FR Yugoslavia
- SCG – Serbia and Montenegro
- SRB – Serbia

Male athletes who competed in water polo at four or more Olympics
Apps	Player	Birth	Pos	Water polo tournaments					Age of first/last	ISHOF member	Note	Ref
Apps	Player	Birth	Pos	1	2	3	4	5	Age of first/last	ISHOF member	Note	Ref
4	Vladimir Vujasinović	1973	FP	1996; FRY	2000; FRY	2004; SCG	2008; SRB		22/35			
4	Dejan Savić	1975	FP	1996; FRY	2000; FRY	2004; SCG	2008; SRB		21/33			
4	Aleksandar Šapić	1978	FP	1996; FRY	2000; FRY	2004; SCG	2008; SRB		18/30			
4	Duško Pijetlović	1985	FP	2008	2012	2016	2020		23/36			
4	Andrija Prlainović	1987	FP	2008	2012	2016	2020		21/34			
4	Filip Filipović	1987	FP	2008	2012	2016	2020		21/34		Flag bearer for Serbia (2020)	
4	Dušan Mandić	1994	FP	2012	2016	2020	2024		18/30			

=== Serbia and Montenegro ===
- Men's national team: Serbia and Montenegro^{†}
- Team appearances: 1 (2004)
- As host team: —
- Related teams: Yugoslavia^{†}, FR Yugoslavia^{†}, Montenegro, Serbia
- Number of five-time Olympians: 0
- Number of four-time Olympians: 0
- Last updated: 27 July 2021.

Notes:

- Predrag Jokić is listed in section Montenegro.
- Aleksandar Šapić is listed in section Serbia.
- Dejan Savić is listed in section Serbia.
- Vladimir Vujasinović is listed in section Serbia.

=== Singapore ===
- Men's national team: Singapore
- Team appearances: 1 (1956)
- As host team: —
- Number of four-time Olympians: 0
- Number of three-time Olympians: 0
- Last updated: 27 July 2021.

=== Slovakia ===
- Men's national team: Slovakia
- Team appearances: 1 (2000)
- As host team: —
- Related team: Czechoslovakia^{†}
- Number of five-time Olympians: 0
- Number of four-time Olympians: 0
- Last updated: 27 July 2021.

=== South Africa ===
- Men's national team: South Africa
- Team appearances: 3 (1952, 1960, 2020)
- As host team: —
- Number of four-time Olympians: 0
- Number of three-time Olympians: 0
- Last updated: 27 July 2021.

=== South Korea ===
- Men's national team: South Korea
- Team appearances: 1 (1988^{*})
- As host team: 1988^{*}
- Number of four-time Olympians: 0
- Number of three-time Olympians: 0
- Last updated: 27 July 2021.

=== Soviet Union ===
- Men's national team: Soviet Union^{†}
- Team appearances: 9 (1952–1980^{*}, 1988)
- As host team: 1980^{*}
- Related teams: Unified Team^{†}, Kazakhstan, Russia, Ukraine

* Number of five-time Olympians: 0

- Number of four-time Olympians: 1
- Last updated: 27 July 2021.

Legend

- – Hosts

Male athletes who competed in water polo at four or more Olympics
Apps	Player	Birth	Pos	Water polo tournaments					Age of first/last	ISHOF member	Note	Ref
Apps	Player	Birth	Pos	1	2	3	4	5	Age of first/last	ISHOF member	Note	Ref
4	Aleksei Barkalov	1946	FP	1968	1972	1976	1980		22/34	1993		

=== Spain ===
- Men's national team: Spain
- Team appearances: 18 (1920–1928, 1948–1952, 1968–1972, 1980–2020)
- As host team: 1992^{*}

* Number of six-time Olympians: 1

- Number of five-time Olympians: 3
- Number of four-time Olympians: 7
- Last updated: 27 July 2021.

Legend and abbreviation

- – Hosts
- CUB – Cuba
- ESP – Spain

Male athletes who competed in water polo at four or more Olympics
Apps	Player	Birth	Pos	Water polo tournaments						Age of first/last	ISHOF member	Note	Ref
Apps	Player	Birth	Pos	1	2	3	4	5	6	Age of first/last	ISHOF member	Note	Ref
6	Manuel Estiarte	1961	FP	1980	1984	1988	1992	1996	2000	18/38	2007	Flag bearer for Spain (2000)	
5	Jordi Sans	1965	FP	1984	1988	1992	1996	2000		18/35			
5	Salvador Gómez	1968	FP	1988	1992	1996	2000	2004		20/36			
5	Jesús Rollán	1968	GK	1988	1992	1996	2000	2004		20/36	2012		
4	Pedro García	1968	FP	1988	1992	1996	2000			19/31			
4	Sergi Pedrerol	1969	FP	1992	1996	2000	2004			22/34			
4	Daniel Ballart	1973	FP	1992	1996	2000	2004			19/31			
4	Ángel Andreo	1972	GK	1996	2000	2004	2008			23/35			
4	Iván Pérez	1971	FP	1992; CUB			2004; ESP	2008; ESP	2012; ESP	21/41			
4	Guillermo Molina	1984	FP	2004	2008	2012	2016			20/32			
4	Felipe Perrone	1986	FP	2008	2012	2016	2020			22/35			

Note:

- Xavier García is listed in section Croatia.

=== Sweden ===
- Men's national team: Sweden
- Team appearances: 8 (1908–1924, 1936–1952, 1980)
- As host team: 1912^{*}

* Number of five-time Olympians: 0

- Number of four-time Olympians: 0
- Last updated: 27 July 2021.

=== Switzerland ===
- Men's national team: Switzerland
- Team appearances: 5 (1920–1928, 1936–1948)
- As host team: —
- Number of five-time Olympians: 0
- Number of four-time Olympians: 0
- Last updated: 27 July 2021.

=== Ukraine ===
- Men's national team: Ukraine
- Team appearances: 1 (1996)
- As host team: —
- Related teams: Soviet Union^{†}, Unified Team^{†}
- Number of five-time Olympians: 0
- Number of four-time Olympians: 0
- Last updated: 27 July 2021.

=== Unified Team ===
- Men's national team: (International Olympic Committee) Unified Team^{†} (Note: In 1992, 12 of the 15 former Soviet Republics competed together as the Unified Team and marched under the Olympic Flag in the Barcelona Games.)
- Team appearances: 1 (1992)
- As host team: —
- Related teams: Soviet Union^{†}, Kazakhstan, Russia, Ukraine
- Number of five-time Olympians: 0
- Number of four-time Olympians: 0
- Last updated: 27 July 2021.

Notes:

- Dmitry Gorshkov is listed in section Russia.
- Nikolay Kozlov is listed in section Russia.

=== United States ===
- Men's national team: United States
- Team appearances: 22 (1920–1972, 1984^{*}–2020)
- As host team: 1932^{*}, 1984^{*}, 1996^{*}

* Number of six-time Olympians: 0

- Number of five-time Olympians: 2
- Number of four-time Olympians: 2
- Last updated: 27 July 2021.

Legend

- – Hosts

Male athletes who competed in water polo at four or more Olympics
Apps	Player	Birth	Pos	Water polo tournaments					Age of first/last	ISHOF member	Note	Ref
Apps	Player	Birth	Pos	1	2	3	4	5	Age of first/last	ISHOF member	Note	Ref
5	Tony Azevedo	1981	FP	2000	2004	2008	2012	2016	18/34			
5	Jesse Smith	1983	FP	2004	2008	2012	2016	2020	21/38			
4	Wally O'Connor	1903	FP	1924	1928	1932	1936		20/32	1966		
4	Ryan Bailey	1975	FP	2000	2004	2008	2012		25/36			

=== United Team of Germany ===
- Men's national team: United Team of Germany^{†}
- Team appearances: 3 (1956–1964)
- As host team: —
- Related teams: Germany, East Germany^{†}, West Germany^{†}
- Number of five-time Olympians: 0
- Number of four-time Olympians: 0
- Last updated: 27 July 2021.

=== Uruguay ===
- Men's national team: Uruguay
- Team appearances: 2 (1936–1948)
- As host team: —
- Number of four-time Olympians: 0
- Number of three-time Olympians: 0
- Last updated: 27 July 2021.

=== West Germany ===
- Men's national team: West Germany^{†}
- Team appearances: 5 (1968–1976, 1984–1988)
- As host team: 1972^{*}
- Related teams: Germany, United Team of Germany^{†}
- Number of five-time Olympians: 0
- Number of four-time Olympians: 1
- Last updated: 8 March 2021.

Legend and abbreviation

- – Hosts
- FRG – West Germany
- MEX – Mexico

Male athletes who competed in water polo at four or more Olympics
Apps	Player	Birth	Pos	Water polo tournaments					Age of first/last	ISHOF member	Note	Ref
Apps	Player	Birth	Pos	1	2	3	4	5	Age of first/last	ISHOF member	Note	Ref
4	Armando Fernández	1955	FP	1972; MEX	1976; MEX		1984; FRG	1988; FRG	17/33			

Note:

- Peter Röhle is listed in section Germany.

=== Yugoslavia ===
- Men's national team: Yugoslavia^{†}
- Team appearances: 12 (1936–1988)
- As host team: —
- Related teams: Croatia, FR Yugoslavia^{†}, Serbia and Montenegro^{†}, Montenegro, Serbia

* Number of five-time Olympians: 0

- Number of four-time Olympians: 2
- Last updated: 27 July 2021.

Male athletes who competed in water polo at four or more Olympics
Apps	Player	Birth	Pos	Water polo tournaments					Age of first/last	ISHOF member	Note	Ref
Apps	Player	Birth	Pos	1	2	3	4	5	Age of first/last	ISHOF member	Note	Ref
4	Mirko Sandić	1942	FP	1960	1964	1968	1972		18/30	1999	Flag bearer for Yugoslavia (1972)	
4	Ozren Bonačić	1942	FP	1964	1968	1972	1976		22/34			

Note:

- Dubravko Šimenc is listed in section Croatia.

=== FR Yugoslavia ===
- Men's national team: Yugoslavia^{†} (Note: After the breakup of Yugoslavia, FR Yugoslavia men's national water polo team participated at the 1996 and 2000 Olympics, and won a bronze medal in 2000. In 2003, after the country was renamed from FR Yugoslavia to Serbia and Montenegro, the team was also renamed to "Serbia and Montenegro men's national water polo team".)
- Team appearances: 2 (1996–2000)
- As host team: —
- Related teams: Yugoslavia^{†}, Serbia and Montenegro^{†}, Montenegro, Serbia
- Number of five-time Olympians: 0
- Number of four-time Olympians: 0
- Last updated: 27 July 2021.

Notes:

- Aleksandar Šapić is listed in section Serbia.
- Dejan Savić is listed in section Serbia.
- Vladimir Vujasinović is listed in section Serbia.

== See also ==
- Water polo at the Summer Olympics
- Lists of Olympic water polo records and statistics
  - List of men's Olympic water polo tournament records and statistics
  - List of women's Olympic water polo tournament records and statistics
  - List of Olympic champions in men's water polo
  - List of Olympic champions in women's water polo
  - National team appearances in the men's Olympic water polo tournament
  - National team appearances in the women's Olympic water polo tournament
  - List of players who have appeared in multiple women's Olympic water polo tournaments
  - List of Olympic medalists in water polo (men)
  - List of Olympic medalists in water polo (women)
  - List of men's Olympic water polo tournament top goalscorers
  - List of women's Olympic water polo tournament top goalscorers
  - List of men's Olympic water polo tournament goalkeepers
  - List of women's Olympic water polo tournament goalkeepers
  - List of Olympic venues in water polo

== Sources ==
=== Official Reports (IOC) ===
PDF documents in the LA84 Foundation Digital Library:

- Official Report of the 1896 Olympic Games (download, archive)
- Official Report of the 1900 Olympic Games (download, archive)
- Official Report of the 1904 Olympic Games (download, archive)
- Official Report of the 1908 Olympic Games (download, archive) (pp. 359–361)
- Official Report of the 1912 Olympic Games (download, archive) (pp. 1021–1024, 1031–1037)
- Official Report of the 1920 Olympic Games (download, archive) (p. 130)
- Official Report of the 1924 Olympic Games (download, archive) (pp. 439–440, 486–494)
- Official Report of the 1928 Olympic Games (download, archive) (pp. 746–757, 797–807)
- Official Report of the 1932 Olympic Games (download, archive) (pp. 619–623, 646–652)
- Official Report of the 1936 Olympic Games, v.2 (download, archive) (pp. 345–356)
- Official Report of the 1948 Olympic Games (download, archive) (pp. 537–540, 640–647)
- Official Report of the 1952 Olympic Games (download, archive) (pp. 600–608)
- Official Report of the 1956 Olympic Games (download, archive) (pp. 592–594, 624–627)
- Official Report of the 1960 Olympic Games (download, archive) (pp. 552–555, 617–634)
- Official Report of the 1964 Olympic Games, v.2 (download, archive) (pp. 682–698)
- Official Report of the 1968 Olympic Games, v.3 (download, archive) (pp. 449–466, 811–826)
- Official Report of the 1972 Olympic Games, v.3 (download, archive) (pp. 331, 353–365)
- Official Report of the 1976 Olympic Games, v.3 (download, archive) (pp. 446–447, 484–497)
- Official Report of the 1980 Olympic Games, v.3 (download, archive) (pp. 458, 495–510)
- Official Report of the 1984 Olympic Games, v.2 (download, archive) (pp. 528–534)
- Official Report of the 1988 Olympic Games, v.2 (download, archive) (pp. 590–598)
- Official Report of the 1992 Olympic Games, v.5 (download, archive) (pp. 354, 386–400)
- Official Report of the 1996 Olympic Games, v.3 (download, archive) (pp. 56–73)

=== Official Results Books (IOC) ===
PDF documents in the LA84 Foundation Digital Library:

- Official Results Book – 2000 Olympic Games – Water Polo (download, archive)
- Official Results Book – 2004 Olympic Games – Water Polo (download, archive)
- Official Results Book – 2008 Olympic Games – Water Polo (download, archive)

PDF documents on the FINA website:

- Official Results Book – 2012 Olympic Games – Diving, Swimming, Synchronised Swimming, Water Polo (archive) (pp. 284–507)

PDF documents in the Olympic World Library:

- Official Results Book – 2016 Olympic Games – Water Polo (archive)

PDF documents on the International Olympic Committee website:

- Official Results Book – 2020 Olympic Games – Water Polo (archive)
- Official Results Book – 2024 Olympic Games – Water Polo

=== Official Reports (FINA) ===
PDF documents on the FINA website:

- HistoFINA – Water polo medalists and statistics (as of September 2019) (archive) (pp. 4–13)
- 1870–2020 | 150 years of Water Polo – Evolution of its rules (archive)

=== Official website (IOC) ===
Water polo on the International Olympic Committee website:

- Water polo
- Men's water polo

=== Olympedia ===
Water polo on the Olympedia website:

- Water polo Archived 2021-12-28 at the Wayback Machine
- Men's water polo
- Athlete count for water polo
- Water polo venues
- Water polo at the 1900 Summer Olympics (men's tournament)
- Water polo at the 1904 Summer Olympics (men's tournament)
- Water polo at the 1908 Summer Olympics (men's tournament)
- Water polo at the 1912 Summer Olympics (men's tournament)
- Water polo at the 1920 Summer Olympics (men's tournament)
- Water polo at the 1924 Summer Olympics (men's tournament)
- Water polo at the 1928 Summer Olympics (men's tournament)
- Water polo at the 1932 Summer Olympics (men's tournament)
- Water polo at the 1936 Summer Olympics (men's tournament)
- Water polo at the 1948 Summer Olympics (men's tournament)
- Water polo at the 1952 Summer Olympics (men's tournament)
- Water polo at the 1956 Summer Olympics (men's tournament)
- Water polo at the 1960 Summer Olympics (men's tournament)
- Water polo at the 1964 Summer Olympics (men's tournament)
- Water polo at the 1968 Summer Olympics (men's tournament)
- Water polo at the 1972 Summer Olympics (men's tournament)
- Water polo at the 1976 Summer Olympics (men's tournament)
- Water polo at the 1980 Summer Olympics (men's tournament)
- Water polo at the 1984 Summer Olympics (men's tournament)
- Water polo at the 1988 Summer Olympics (men's tournament)
- Water polo at the 1992 Summer Olympics (men's tournament)
- Water polo at the 1996 Summer Olympics (men's tournament)
- Water polo at the 2000 Summer Olympics (men's tournament)
- Water polo at the 2004 Summer Olympics (men's tournament)
- Water polo at the 2008 Summer Olympics (men's tournament)
- Water polo at the 2012 Summer Olympics (men's tournament)
- Water polo at the 2016 Summer Olympics (men's tournament)
- Water polo at the 2020 Summer Olympics (men's tournament)

=== Sports Reference ===
Water polo on the Sports Reference website:

- Country Medal Leaders & Athlete Medal Leaders (1900–2016) (archived)
- Men's water polo (1900–2016) (archived)
- Water polo at the 1900 Summer Games (men's tournament) (archived)
- Water polo at the 1904 Summer Games (men's tournament) (archived)
- Water polo at the 1908 Summer Games (men's tournament) (archived)
- Water polo at the 1912 Summer Games (men's tournament) (archived)
- Water polo at the 1920 Summer Games (men's tournament) (archived)
- Water polo at the 1924 Summer Games (men's tournament) (archived)
- Water polo at the 1928 Summer Games (men's tournament) (archived)
- Water polo at the 1932 Summer Games (men's tournament) (archived)
- Water polo at the 1936 Summer Games (men's tournament) (archived)
- Water polo at the 1948 Summer Games (men's tournament) (archived)
- Water polo at the 1952 Summer Games (men's tournament) (archived)
- Water polo at the 1956 Summer Games (men's tournament) (archived)
- Water polo at the 1960 Summer Games (men's tournament) (archived)
- Water polo at the 1964 Summer Games (men's tournament) (archived)
- Water polo at the 1968 Summer Games (men's tournament) (archived)
- Water polo at the 1972 Summer Games (men's tournament) (archived)
- Water polo at the 1976 Summer Games (men's tournament) (archived)
- Water polo at the 1980 Summer Games (men's tournament) (archived)
- Water polo at the 1984 Summer Games (men's tournament) (archived)
- Water polo at the 1988 Summer Games (men's tournament) (archived)
- Water polo at the 1992 Summer Games (men's tournament) (archived)
- Water polo at the 1996 Summer Games (men's tournament) (archived)
- Water polo at the 2000 Summer Games (men's tournament) (archived)
- Water polo at the 2004 Summer Games (men's tournament) (archived)
- Water polo at the 2008 Summer Games (men's tournament) (archived)
- Water polo at the 2012 Summer Games (men's tournament) (archived)
- Water polo at the 2016 Summer Games (men's tournament) (archived)
- Water polo at the 2020 Summer Games (men's tournament) (archived)

=== Todor66 ===
Water polo on the Todor66 website:

- Water polo at the Summer Games
- Water polo at the 1900 Summer Olympics (men's tournament)
- Water polo at the 1904 Summer Olympics (men's tournament)
- Water polo at the 1908 Summer Olympics (men's tournament)
- Water polo at the 1912 Summer Olympics (men's tournament)
- Water polo at the 1920 Summer Olympics (men's tournament)
- Water polo at the 1924 Summer Olympics (men's tournament)
- Water polo at the 1928 Summer Olympics (men's tournament)
- Water polo at the 1932 Summer Olympics (men's tournament)
- Water polo at the 1936 Summer Olympics (men's tournament)
- Water polo at the 1948 Summer Olympics (men's tournament)
- Water polo at the 1952 Summer Olympics (men's tournament)
- Water polo at the 1956 Summer Olympics (men's tournament)
- Water polo at the 1960 Summer Olympics (men's tournament)
- Water polo at the 1964 Summer Olympics (men's tournament)
- Water polo at the 1968 Summer Olympics (men's tournament, men's qualification)
- Water polo at the 1972 Summer Olympics (men's tournament, men's qualification)
- Water polo at the 1976 Summer Olympics (men's tournament, men's European qualification)
- Water polo at the 1980 Summer Olympics (men's tournament, men's European qualification, men's world qualification)
- Water polo at the 1984 Summer Olympics (men's tournament, men's qualification)
- Water polo at the 1988 Summer Olympics (men's tournament, men's qualification)
- Water polo at the 1992 Summer Olympics (men's tournament, men's qualification)
- Water polo at the 1996 Summer Olympics (men's tournament, men's qualification)
- Water polo at the 2000 Summer Olympics (men's tournament, men's qualification)
- Water polo at the 2004 Summer Olympics (men's tournament, men's qualification)
- Water polo at the 2008 Summer Olympics (men's tournament, men's qualification)
- Water polo at the 2012 Summer Olympics (men's tournament, men's qualification)
- Water polo at the 2016 Summer Olympics (men's tournament, men's qualification)
- Water polo at the 2020 Summer Olympics (men's tournament, men's qualification)
- Water polo at the 2024 Summer Olympics (men's tournament, men's qualification)

=== ISHOF ===
International Swimming Hall of Fame (ISHOF) website:

- Honorees Listed by Category – Water Polo
- Honorees Listed by Category – Coaches
- Honorees Listed by Category – Contributors
- Honorees by Country
- Honorees By Last Name
