= Andrew Kerr (water polo) =

Australian water polo player

Personal information
- Born: April 2, 1954 (age 70); Cronulla, New South Wales, Australia

Sport
- Sport: Water polo

Andrew Kerr OAM (born 2 April 1954) is an Australian former water polo player who competed in the 1976 Summer Olympics, the 1980 Summer Olympics, the 1984 Summer Olympics, and the 1988 Summer Olympics.

== Family ==
Andrew Kerr has 3 siblings, brothers Peter, Bill and sister Cecilia. His mother was Petronella Lynch (d. 2004) from Mildura. His father was Henry 'Harry' Kerr (c. 1921-July 2013), a retail clerk who reached the rank of Flight Lieutenant during service with the Royal Australian Air Force in World War 2. 'Harry' flew Kittyhawks with No. 76 Squadron RAAF and was also a flight instructor.

== Honours ==
In 2009, Kerr was inducted into the Water Polo Australia Hall of Fame. He was awarded the Medal of the Order of Australia in the 2014 New Year's Day honours list.

== See also ==
- Australia men's Olympic water polo team records and statistics
- List of players who have appeared in multiple men's Olympic water polo tournaments
