= Anastasios Papanastasiou =

Greek water polo player (born 1964)

Personal information
- Born: July 12, 1964 (age 61)

Sport
- Sport: Water polo

Anastasios "Tasos" Papanastasiou (born 12 July 1964) is a Greek former water polo player who competed in the 1984 Summer Olympics, in the 1988 Summer Olympics, in the 1992 Summer Olympics, and in the 1996 Summer Olympics.

== See also ==
- Greece men's Olympic water polo team records and statistics
- List of players who have appeared in multiple men's Olympic water polo tournaments
