= Irek Zinnurov =

Russian water polo player

Irek Zinnourov
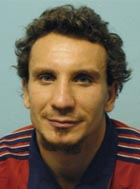

Personal information
- Born: 11 January 1969 (age 57) Yakutsk, Soviet Union
- Height: 1.87 m (6 ft 2 in)
- Weight: 84 kg (185 lb)

Sport
- Sport: Water polo
- Club: Spartak Volgograd; Sintez Kazan
Medal record
Representing Russia
Olympic Games
Silver medal – second place	2000 Sydney	Team competition
Bronze medal – third place	2004 Athens	Team competition
World Championships
Bronze medal – third place	2001 Fukuoka	Team competition
FINA World Cup
Gold medal – first place	2002 Belgrade	Team competition

Irek Khaydarovich Zinnurov (Russian: Ирек Хайдарович Зиннуров; born 11 January 1969) is a Russian water polo player of Tatar origin who played on the silver medal squad at the 2000 Summer Olympics and the bronze medal squad at the 2004 Summer Olympics. He won four Russian titles as a captain of the Kazan club Sintez. After retirement from competitions, in 2010, he became its vice-president, and in 2011 its head coach.

Zinnurov is married to his schoolmate; they have a son Emil, who also plays water polo.

== See also ==
- Russia men's Olympic water polo team records and statistics
- List of Olympic medalists in water polo (men)
- List of World Aquatics Championships medalists in water polo
