= Konstantinos Nikolopoulos (water polo) =

Greek water polo player

Personal information
- Nationality: Greek

Sport
- Sport: Water polo

Konstantinos Nikolopoulos was a Greek water polo player. He competed in the men's tournament at the 1920 Summer Olympics.

== See also ==
- Greece men's Olympic water polo team records and statistics
- List of men's Olympic water polo tournament goalkeepers
