= Dmitri Dugin =

Russian water polo player

Personal information
- Born: August 29, 1968 (age 58) Moscow, Soviet Union

Sport
- Sport: Water polo
Medal record
Representing Russia
Olympic Games
Silver medal – second place	2000 Sydney	Team competition
World Championships
Bronze medal – third place	1994 Rome	Team competition

Dmitri Evgenievich Dugin (Russian: Дми́трий Евге́ньевич Ду́гин; born August 29, 1968) is a Russian water polo player who played on the silver medal squad at the 2000 Summer Olympics.

== See also ==
- Russia men's Olympic water polo team records and statistics
- List of Olympic medalists in water polo (men)
- List of men's Olympic water polo tournament goalkeepers
- List of World Aquatics Championships medalists in water polo
