= Aleksandr Yeryshov =

Russian water polo player

Personal information
- Full name: Aleksandr Anatolyevich Yeryshov
- Born: January 17, 1973 (age 53) Tuapse, Soviet Union
Medal record
Men's water polo
Representing Russia
Olympic Games
Silver medal – second place	2000 Sydney	Team competition
Bronze medal – third place	2004 Athens	Team competition
FINA World Cup
Gold medal – first place	2002 Belgrade	Team competition

Aleksandr Anatolyevich Yeryshov (Russian: Александр Анатольевич Ерышов; born January 17, 1973) is a Russian water polo player who played on the silver medal squad at the 2000 Summer Olympics and the bronze medal squad at the 2004 Summer Olympics.

Yerishev became the topscorer at the 2001 European Championship in Budapest, Hungary, scoring 21 goals.

== See also ==
- Russia men's Olympic water polo team records and statistics
- List of Olympic medalists in water polo (men)
- List of men's Olympic water polo tournament top goalscorers
- List of World Aquatics Championships medalists in water polo

Awards
Preceded by (Federal Republic of Yugoslavia) Vladimir Vujasinović	Most Valuable Player of Water Polo European Championship; 2003	Succeeded by (Hungary) Tamás Kásás
