= Vitaly Yurchik =

Russian water polo player

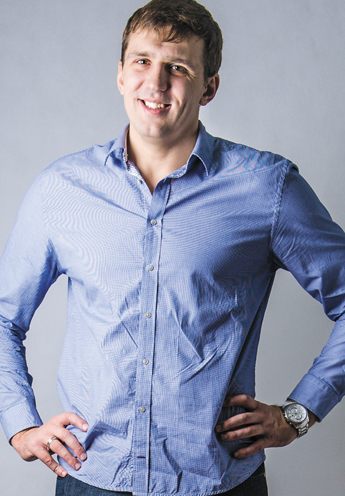
- Yurchik in 2013

Personal information
- Born: 17 May 1983 (age 43) Brest, Belarusian SSR, Soviet Union
- Height: 201 cm (6 ft 7 in)
- Weight: 104 kg (229 lb)

Sport
- Sport: Water polo
- Club: Spartak Volgograd
Medal record
Representing Russia
Olympic Games
Bronze medal – third place	2004 Athens	Team competition
FINA World Cup
Gold medal – first place	2002 Belgrade	Team competition

Vitaly Sergeyevich Yurchik (Russian: Виталий Серге́евич Юрчик, born 17 May 1983) is a retired Russian water polo player who played on the bronze medal squad at the 2004 Summer Olympics.

== See also ==
- List of Olympic medalists in water polo (men)
