= Aleksandr Fyodorov (water polo) =

Russian water polo player

Aleksandr Sergeyevich Fyodorov
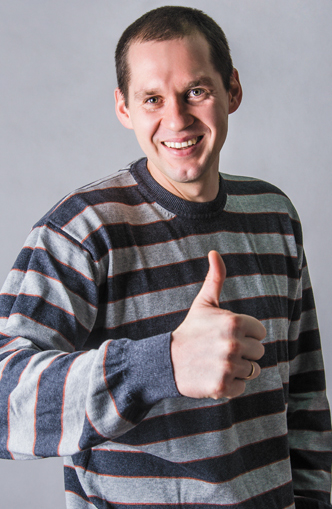
- Fyodorov in 2013

Personal information
- Born: 26 January 1981 (age 45) Sevastopol, Soviet Union
- Height: 198 cm (6 ft 6 in)
- Weight: 82 kg (181 lb)

Sport
- Sport: Water polo
- Club: Spartak Volgograd
Medal record
Representing Russia
Olympic Games
Bronze medal – third place	2004 Athens	Team competition
World Championships
Bronze medal – third place	2001 Fukuoka	Team competition
FINA World Cup
Gold medal – first place	2002 Belgrade	Team competition

Aleksandr Sergeyevich Fyodorov (Russian: Александр Серге́евич Фёдоров; born 26 January 1981) is a Russian water polo player who played on the bronze medal squad at the 2004 Summer Olympics. In his later career, he has been playing for Kazakhstan.

== See also ==
- Russia men's Olympic water polo team records and statistics
- List of Olympic medalists in water polo (men)
- List of men's Olympic water polo tournament goalkeepers
- List of World Aquatics Championships medalists in water polo
