= Nikolaos Christoforidis =

Greek water polo player

Personal information
- Born: June 11, 1965 (age 59)

Sport
- Sport: Water polo

Nikolaos Christoforidis (born 11 June 1965) is a Greek former water polo player who competed in the 1988 Summer Olympics.

== See also ==
- Greece men's Olympic water polo team records and statistics
- List of men's Olympic water polo tournament goalkeepers
