= Andrei Rekechinski =

Russian water polo player

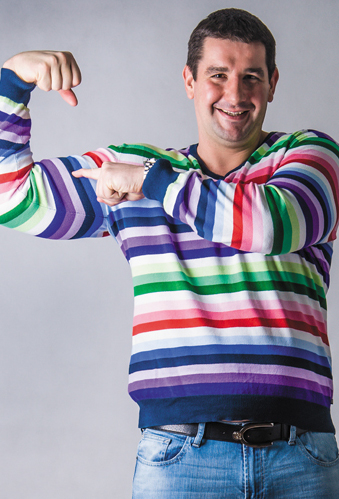
- Rekechinski in 2013

Personal information
- Born: 7 January 1981 (age 45) Volgograd, Soviet Union
- Height: 190 cm (6 ft 3 in)
- Weight: 109 kg (240 lb)

Sport
- Sport: Water polo
- Club: Spartak Volgograd
Medal record
Representing Russia
Olympic Games
Silver medal – second place	2000 Sydney	Team competition
Bronze medal – third place	2004 Athens	Team competition
World Championships
Bronze medal – third place	2001 Fukuoka	Team
FINA World Cup
Gold medal – first place	2002 Belgrade	Team competition

Andrei Rekechinski (born 7 January 1981) is a retired Russian water polo player who played on the silver medal squad at the 2000 Summer Olympics and the bronze medal squad at the 2004 Summer Olympics. Since 2016-2022, he worked as a general director for the football club FC Rotor Volgograd.

== See also ==
- List of Olympic medalists in water polo (men)
- List of World Aquatics Championships medalists in water polo
