= Bernardo Gomes =

Bernardo Gomes may refer to:

- Bernardo Gomes (footballer) (born 2004), Portuguese footballer
- Bernardo Gomes (water polo) (born 1993), Brazilian water polo player
