= Georgios Afroudakis =

Greek water polo player

Personal information
- Born: 17 October 1976 (age 49) Athens, Greece

Sport
- Sport: Water polo
Medal record
Representing Greece
World Championships
Bronze medal – third place	2005 Montreal	Team competition

Georgios Afroudakis (born 17 October 1976) is a Greek water polo player. He played in five consecutive Summer Olympics for his native country from 1996 to 2012. He is, jointly with Croat Igor Hinić and Hungarian Tamás Kásás, the tenth athlete to compete in water polo at five Olympics.

== See also ==
- Greece men's Olympic water polo team records and statistics
- List of athletes with the most appearances at Olympic Games
- List of players who have appeared in multiple men's Olympic water polo tournaments
- List of men's Olympic water polo tournament top goalscorers
- List of World Aquatics Championships medalists in water polo
