= National team appearances in the women's Olympic water polo tournament =

This article presents the national team appearances in the women's Olympic water polo tournament since the inaugural official edition in 2000.

As of 2016, Thirteen women's national water polo teams from five continents have competed at the Summer Olympics. Four teams have won all five tournaments. The inaugural winners in 2000 were Australia; the current champions are United States. The most successful team is currently United States women's team, who has won the Olympic title on two occasions.

== Abbreviations ==
| Apps | Appearances | Rk | Rank | Ref | Reference |
| p. | page | pp. | pages | | |

== Team statistics ==
=== Comprehensive team results by tournament ===
Note: Results of Olympic qualification tournaments are not included.

Legend

- 1st – Champions
- 2nd – Runners-up
- 3rd – Third place
- 4th – Fourth place
- Q – Qualified for forthcoming tournament
- – Hosts

Abbreviation

- stats – Olympic water polo team statistics

Africa – CANA (1 team)
| Women's team | 2000 | 2004 | 2008 | 2012 | 2016 | 2020 | 2024 | Years |
| South Africa | | | | | | 10th | WD | 1 |
Americas – UANA (3 teams)
| Women's team | 2000 | 2004 | 2008 | 2012 | 2016 | 2020 | 2024 | Years |
| Brazil | | | | | 8th | | | 1 |
| Canada (stats) | 5th | 7th | | | | 7th | 8th | 4 |
| United States (stats) | 2nd | 3rd | 2nd | 1st | 1st | 1st | 4th | 7 |
Asia – AASF (3 teams)
| Women's team | 2000 | 2004 | 2008 | 2012 | 2016 | 2020 | 2024 | Years |
| China (stats) | | | 5th | 5th | 7th | 8th | 10th | 5 |
| Japan | | | | | | 9th | | 1 |
| Kazakhstan | 6th | 8th | | | | | | 2 |
Europe – LEN (9 teams)
| Women's team | 2000 | 2004 | 2008 | 2012 | 2016 | 2020 | 2024 | Years |
| France | | | | | | | 9th | 1 |
| Great Britain | | | | 8th | | | | 1 |
| Greece (stats) | | 2nd | 8th | | | | 7th | 3 |
| Hungary (stats) | | 6th | 4th | 4th | 4th | 3rd | 5th | 6 |
| Italy (stats) | | 1st | 6th | 7th | 2nd | | 6th | 5 |
| Netherlands (stats) | 4th | | 1st | | | 6th | 3rd | 4 |
| ROC (stats) | | | | | | 4th | | 1 |
| Russia (stats) | 3rd | 5th | 7th | 6th | 3rd | | | 5 |
| Spain (stats) | | | | 2nd | 5th | 2nd | 1st | 4 |
Oceania – OSA (1 team)
| Women's team | 2000 | 2004 | 2008 | 2012 | 2016 | 2020 | 2024 | Years |
| Australia (stats) | 1st | 4th | 3rd | 3rd | 6th | 5th | 2nd | 7 |
| Total teams | 6 | 8 | 8 | 8 | 8 | 10 | 10 | |

=== Debut of teams ===
Last updated: 7 January 2024.

Legend

- Team^{*} – Host team

| # | Year | Debuting teams | | | | | Number | Cumulative total |
| # | Year | Africa | Americas | Asia | Europe | Oceania | Number | Cumulative total |
|---|---|---|---|---|---|---|---|---|
| 1 | 2000 | – | Canada, United States | Kazakhstan | Netherlands, Russia | Australia^{*} | 6 | 6 |
| 2 | 2004 | – | – | – | Greece^{*}, Hungary, Italy | – | 3 | 9 |
| 3 | 2008 | – | – | China^{*} | – | – | 1 | 10 |
| 4 | 2012 | – | – | – | Great Britain^{*}, Spain | – | 2 | 12 |
| 5 | 2016 | – | Brazil^{*} | – | – | – | 1 | 13 |
| 6 | 2020 | South Africa | – | Japan^{*} | – | – | 2 | 15 |
| 7 | 2024 | – | – | – | France^{*} | – | 1 | 16 |
| Total | | 1 | 3 | 3 | 8 | 1 | 16 | 16 |

=== Number of appearances by team ===
The following table is pre-sorted by number of appearances (in descending order), year of the last appearance (in ascending order), year of the first appearance (in ascending order), name of the team (in ascending order), respectively. Last updated: 7 August 2021.

Legend and abbreviation

- Year^{*} – As host team
- Apps – Appearances
- stats – Olympic water polo team statistics

Number of appearances by team
| Rk | Women's team | Apps | Record streak | Active streak | Debut | Most recent | Best finish | Confederation |
|---|---|---|---|---|---|---|---|---|
| 1 | Australia (stats) | 7 | 7 | 7 | 2000^{*} | 2024 | Champions | Oceania – OSA |
| 1 | United States (stats) | 6 | 7 | 7 | 2000 | 2024 | Champions | Americas – UANA |
| 3 | Russia (stats) | 6 | 6 | 0 | 2000 | 2020 | Third place | Europe – LEN |
| 3 | Hungary (stats) | 6 | 6 | 6 | 2004 | 2024 | Fourth place | Europe – LEN |
| 6 | Italy (stats) | 5 | 4 | 1 | 2004 | 2024 | Champions | Europe – LEN |
| 6 | China (stats) | 5 | 5 | 5 | 2008^{*} | 2024 | Fifth place | Asia – AASF |
| 7 | Canada (stats) | 4 | 2 | 2 | 2000 | 2024 | Fifth place | Americas – UANA |
| 7 | Netherlands (stats) | 4 | 2 | 2 | 2000 | 2024 | Champions | Europe – LEN |
| 7 | Spain (stats) | 4 | 4 | 4 | 2012 | 2024 | Champions | Europe – LEN |
| 10 | Greece (stats) | 3 | 2 | 1 | 2004^{*} | 2024 | Runners-up | Europe – LEN |
| 11 | Kazakhstan | 2 | 2 | 0 | 2000 | 2004 | Sixth place | Asia – AASF |
| 12 | Great Britain | 1 | 1 | 0 | 2012^{*} | 2012^{*} | Eighth place | Europe – LEN |
| 12 | Brazil | 1 | 1 | 0 | 2016^{*} | 2016^{*} | Eighth place | Americas – UANA |
| 12 | Japan | 1 | 1 | 0 | 2020^{*} | 2020^{*} | Ninth place | Asia – AASF |
| 12 | South Africa | 1 | 1 | 0 | 2020 | 2020 | Tenth place | Africa – CANA |
| 12 | France | 1 | 1 | 1 | 2024^{*} | 2024^{*} | Ninth place | Europe – LEN |
| Rk | Women's team | Apps | Record streak | Active streak | Debut | Most recent | Best finish | Confederation |

=== Results of host teams ===
Last updated: 7 August 2021.

Legend and abbreviation

- Year^{*} – As host team
- Finish^{‡} – It is the best performance of the team
- Apps – Appearances

| # | Year | Host team | Finish | Best finish | Apps | Confederation |
|---|---|---|---|---|---|---|
| 1 | 2000 | Australia | 1st^{‡} of 6 teams | Champions (2000^{*}) | 5 | Oceania – OSA |
| 2 | 2004 | Greece | 2nd^{‡} of 8 teams | Runners-up (2004^{*}) | 2 | Europe – LEN |
| 3 | 2008 | China | 5th^{‡} of 8 teams | Fifth place (2008^{*}, 2012) | 3 | Asia – AASF |
| 4 | 2012 | Great Britain | 8th^{‡} of 8 teams | Eighth place (2012^{*}) | 1 | Europe – LEN |
| 5 | 2016 | Brazil | 8th^{‡} of 8 teams | Eighth place (2016^{*}) | 1 | Americas – UANA |
| 6 | 2020 | Japan | 9th^{‡} of 10 teams | Ninth place (2020^{*}) | 1 | Asia – AASF |

=== Results of defending champions and runners-up ===
Last updated: 7 August 2021.

Legend

- Team^{*} – Host team

| # | Year | Defending champions | Finish | Defending runners-up | Finish |
|---|---|---|---|---|---|
| 1 | 2000 | | | | |
| 2 | 2004 | Australia | 4th of 8 teams | United States | 3rd of 8 teams |
| 3 | 2008 | Italy | 6th of 8 teams | Greece | 8th of 8 teams |
| 4 | 2012 | Netherlands | did not qualify | United States | 1st of 8 teams |
| 5 | 2016 | United States | 1st of 8 teams | Spain | 5th of 8 teams |
| 6 | 2020 | United States | 1st of 10 teams | Italy | did not qualify |

=== Best finishes by team ===
The following table is pre-sorted by best finish (in descending order), name of the team (in ascending order), respectively. Last updated: 7 August 2024.

Legend and abbreviation

- Year^{*} – As host team
- Apps – Appearances
- stats – Olympic water polo team statistics

Best finishes by team
| Rk | Women's team | Best finish | Apps | Confederation |
|---|---|---|---|---|
| 1 | United States (stats) | Champions (2002, 2006) | 7 | Americas – UANA |
| 2 | Australia (stats) | Champions (2000^{*}) | 7 | Oceania – OSA |
| 2 | Italy (stats) | Champions (2004) | 5 | Europe – LEN |
| 2 | Netherlands (stats) | Champions (2008) | 4 | Europe – LEN |
| 2 | Spain (stats) | Champions (2024) | 4 | Europe – LEN |
| 6 | Greece (stats) | Runners-up (2004^{*}) | 3 | Europe – LEN |
| 7 | Russia (stats) | Third place (2000, 2016) | 6 | Europe – LEN |
| 8 | Hungary (stats) | Fourth place (2008, 2012, 2016) | 6 | Europe – LEN |
| 9 | China (stats) | Fifth place (2008^{*}, 2012) | 5 | Asia – AASF |
| 10 | Canada (stats) | Fifth place (2000) | 4 | Americas – UANA |
| 11 | Kazakhstan | Sixth place (2000) | 2 | Asia – AASF |
| 12 | Brazil | Eighth place (2016^{*}) | 1 | Americas – UANA |
| 12 | Great Britain | Eighth place (2012^{*}) | 1 | Europe – LEN |
| 14 | Japan | Ninth place (2020^{*}) | 1 | Asia – AASF |
| 14 | France | Eighth place (2024^{*}) | 1 | Europe – LEN |
| 15 | South Africa | Tenth place (2020) | 1 | Africa – CANA |
| Rk | Women's team | Best finish | Apps | Confederation |

=== Finishes in the top four ===
The following table is pre-sorted by total finishes in the top four (in descending order), number of Olympic gold medals (in descending order), number of Olympic silver medals (in descending order), number of Olympic bronze medals (in descending order), name of the team (in ascending order), respectively. Last updated: 7 August 2021.

Legend

- Year^{*} – As host team

| Rk | Women's team | Total | Champions | Runners-up | Third place | Fourth place | First | Last |
|---|---|---|---|---|---|---|---|---|
| 1 | United States | 6 | 3 (2012, 2016, 2020) | 2 (2000, 2008) | 1 (2004) | 1 (2024) | 2000 | 2024 |
| 2 | Australia | 5 | 1 (2000^{*}) | 1 (2024) | 3 (2008, 2012) | 1 (2004) | 2000 | 2024 |
| 3 | Hungary | 4 | | | 1 (2020) | 3 (2008, 2012, 2016) | 2008 | 2020 |
| 4 | Spain | 3 | 1 (2024) | 2 (2012, 2020) | | | 2012 | 2024 |
| 5 | Netherlands | 3 | 1 (2008) | | 1 (2024) | 1 (2000) | 2000 | 2024 |
| 6 | Italy | 2 | 1 (2004) | 1 (2016) | | | 2004 | 2016 |
| 7 | Russia | 2 | | | 2 (2000, 2016) | | 2000 | 2016 |
| 8 | Greece | 1 | | 1 (2004^{*}) | | | 2004 | 2004 |
| 9 | ROC | 1 | | | | 1 (2020) | 2020 | 2020 |
| Rk | Women's team | Total | Champions | Runners-up | Third place | Fourth place | First | Last |

=== Medal table ===
The following table is pre-sorted by number of Olympic gold medals (in descending order), number of Olympic silver medals (in descending order), number of Olympic bronze medals (in descending order), name of the team (in ascending order), respectively. Last updated: 7 August 2021.

The United States is the most successful country in the women's Olympic water polo tournament, with three gold, two silver and one bronze.

| Rank | Women's team | Gold | Silver | Bronze | Total |
|---|---|---|---|---|---|
| 1 | United States (USA) | 3 | 2 | 1 | 6 |
| 2 | Spain (ESP) | 1 | 2 | 0 | 3 |
| 3 | Australia (AUS) | 1 | 1 | 2 | 4 |
| 4 | Italy (ITA) | 1 | 1 | 0 | 2 |
| 5 | Netherlands (NED) | 1 | 0 | 1 | 2 |
| 6 | Greece (GRE) | 0 | 1 | 0 | 1 |
| 7 | Russia (RUS) | 0 | 0 | 2 | 2 |
| 8 | Hungary (HUN) | 0 | 0 | 1 | 1 |
| Totals (8 entries) | | 7 | 7 | 7 | 21 |

=== Longest active appearance droughts ===
The following table is pre-sorted by number of Olympic tournaments missed (in descending order), year of the last appearance (in ascending order), name of the team (in ascending order), respectively. Last updated: 7 August 2021.

Notes:

- Does not include teams that have not yet made their first appearance at the Olympics or teams that no longer exist.

Legend

- Year^{*} – As host team

Longest active appearance droughts
| Rk | Women's team | Last appearance | Olympics missed | Best finish | Confederation |
|---|---|---|---|---|---|
| 1 | Kazakhstan | 2004 | 4 | Sixth place | Asia – AASF |
| 2 | Greece | 2008 | 3 | Runners-up | Europe – LEN |
| 3 | Great Britain | 2012^{*} | 2 | Eighth place | Europe – LEN |
| 4 | Brazil | 2016^{*} | 1 | Eighth place | Americas – UANA |
| 4 | Italy | 2016 | 1 | Champions | Europe – LEN |
| 6 | Australia | 2020 | 0 | Champions | Oceania – OSA |
| 6 | Canada | 2020 | 0 | Fifth place | Americas – UANA |
| 6 | China | 2020 | 0 | Fifth place | Asia – AASF |
| 6 | Hungary | 2020 | 0 | Fourth place | Europe – LEN |
| 6 | Japan | 2020^{*} | 0 | Ninth place | Asia – AASF |
| 6 | Netherlands | 2020 | 0 | Champions | Europe – LEN |
| 6 | Russia | 2020 | 0 | Third place | Europe – LEN |
| 6 | South Africa | 2020 | 0 | Tenth place | Africa – CANA |
| 6 | Spain | 2020 | 0 | Runners-up | Europe – LEN |
| 6 | United States | 2020 | 0 | Champions | Americas – UANA |
| Rk | Women's team | Last appearance | Olympics missed | Best finish | Confederation |

=== Longest appearance droughts overall ===
The following table is pre-sorted by number of Olympic tournaments missed (in descending order), year of the previous appearance (in ascending order), name of the team (in ascending order), respectively. Last updated: 7 August 2021.

Notes:

- Only includes droughts begun after a team's first appearance and until the team ceased to exist.
- With the exception of 1916, 1940 and 1944, does not include droughts when the Olympic tournament was not held due to World War I and II.

Legend

- Year^{*} – As host team
- Team^{†} – Defunct team

Longest appearance droughts overall
| Rk | Women's team | Prev. appearance | Next appearance | Olympics missed | Best finish | Confederation |
|---|---|---|---|---|---|---|
| 1 | Kazakhstan | 2004 | active | 4 | Sixth place | Asia – AASF |
| 2 | Canada | 2004 | 2020 | 3 | Fifth place | Americas – UANA |
| 2 | Greece | 2008 | active | 3 | Runners-up | Europe – LEN |
| 4 | Netherlands | 2008 | 2020 | 2 | Champions | Europe – LEN |
| 4 | Great Britain | 2012^{*} | active | 2 | Eighth place | Europe – LEN |
| 6 | Brazil | 2016^{*} | active | 1 | Eighth place | Americas – UANA |
| 6 | Italy | 2016 | active | 1 | Champions | Europe – LEN |
| 8 | Australia | 2020 | active | 0 | Champions | Oceania – OSA |
| 8 | China | 2020 | active | 0 | Fifth place | Asia – AASF |
| 8 | Hungary | 2020 | active | 0 | Fourth place | Europe – LEN |
| 8 | Japan | 2020^{*} | active | 0 | Ninth place | Asia – AASF |
| 8 | Russia | 2020 | active | 0 | Third place | Europe – LEN |
| 8 | South Africa | 2020 | active | 0 | Tenth place | Africa – CANA |
| 8 | Spain | 2020 | active | 0 | Runners-up | Europe – LEN |
| 8 | United States | 2020 | active | 0 | Champions | Americas – UANA |
| Rk | Women's team | Prev. appearance | Next appearance | Olympics missed | Best finish | Confederation |

=== Team records ===
Teams having equal quantities in the tables below are ordered by the tournament the quantity was attained in (the teams that attained the quantity first are listed first). If the quantity was attained by more than one team in the same tournament, these teams are ordered alphabetically. Last updated: 7 August 2021.

Legend

- Year^{*} – As host team

==== Appearances ====
Most appearances
6, Australia, United States (have participated in every tournament).
Most appearances, never winning a title
5, Russia (has participated in every tournament).
Most appearances, never finishing in the top two
5, Russia (has participated in every tournament).
Most appearances, never winning a medal
4, China (2008^{*}, 2012, 2016, 2020).
Most appearances, never finishing in the top four
4, China (2008^{*}, 2012, 2016, 2020).
Fewest appearances
1, Great Britain (2012^{*}), Brazil (2016^{*}), Japan (2020^{*}), ROC (2020), South Africa (2020).
Fewest appearances, winning a title
3, Netherlands (2008).
Fewest appearances, finishing in the top two
2, Greece (2004^{*}).
Fewest appearances, winning a medal
2, Greece (2004^{*}).
Fewest appearances, finishing in the top four
2, Greece (2004^{*}).

==== Top four ====
Most titles won
3, United States (2012, 2016, 2020).
Most second-place finishes
2, United States (2000, 2008), Spain (2012, 2020).
Most third-place finishes
2, Australia (2008, 2012), Russia (2000, 2016).
Most fourth-place finishes
3, Hungary (2008, 2012, 2016).
Most finishes in the top two
5, United States (2000, 2008, 2012, 2016, 2020).
Most finishes in the top two, never winning a title
2, Spain (2012, 2020).
Most finishes in the top three
6, United States (has been medaled in every tournament).
Most finishes in the top three, never winning a title
2, Russia (2000, 2016), Spain (2012, 2020).
Most finishes in the top three, never finishing in the top two
2, Russia (2000, 2016).
Most finishes in the top four
6, United States (has finished in the top four in every tournament).
Most finishes in the top four, never winning a title
4, Hungary (2008, 2012, 2016, 2020).
Most finishes in the top four, never finishing in the top two
4, Hungary (2008, 2012, 2016, 2020).
Most finishes in the top four, never winning a medal
1, ROC (2020).
Fewest finishes in the top two, winning a title
1, Australia (2000^{*}), Netherlands (2008).
Fewest finishes in the top three, winning a title
1, Netherlands (2008).
Fewest finishes in the top three, finishing in the top two
1, Greece (2004^{*}), Netherlands (2008).
Fewest finishes in the top four, winning a title
2, Netherlands (2000, 2008), Italy (2004, 2016).
Fewest finishes in the top four, finishing in the top two
1, Greece (2004^{*}).
Fewest finishes in the top four, winning a medal
1, Greece (2004^{*}).

==== Consecutive ====
Most consecutive titles won
3, United States (2012–2016–2020).
Most consecutive second-place finishes
None.
Most consecutive third-place finishes
2, Australia (2008–2012).
Most consecutive fourth-place finishes
3, Hungary (2008–2012–2016).
Most consecutive finishes in the top two
4, United States (2008–2012–2016–2020).
Most consecutive finishes in the top three
6, United States (has been medaled in every tournament).
Most consecutive finishes in the top four
6, United States (has finished in the top four in every tournament).
Most consecutive appearances
6, Australia, United States (have participated in every tournament).
Biggest improvement in position in consecutive tournaments
Did not participate/qualify, then won the title, Italy (2000–2004), Netherlands (2004–2008).

==== Gaps ====
Longest gap between successive titles
None.
Longest gap between successive second-place finishes
9 years, Spain (2012, 2020).
Longest gap between successive third-place finishes
16 years, Russia (2000, 2016).
Longest gap between successive fourth-place finishes
None.
Longest gap between successive appearances in the top two
12 years, Italy (2004–2016).
Longest gap between successive appearances in the top three
16 years, Russia (2000–2016).
Longest gap between successive appearances in the top four
16 years, Russia (2000–2016).
Longest gap between successive appearances
17 years, Canada (2004–2020).

==== Debuting teams ====
Best finish by a debuting team
Champions, Australia (2000^{*}), Italy (2004).
Worst finish by a debuting team
10th position (last position), South Africa (2020).

==== Host teams ====
Best finish by host team
Champions: Australia (2000^{*}).
Worst finish by host team
9th position, Japan (2020^{*}).
Best finish by last host team
4th position, Australia (2004).
Worst finish by last host team
Did not participate/qualify, Great Britain (2016), Brazil (2020).
Worst finish by last host team that participates in the tournament
8th position (last position), Greece (2008).
Had its best performance as hosts
Champions, Australia (2000^{*}).
Runners-up, Greece (2004^{*}).
5th position, China (2008^{*}).
8th position, Great Britain (2012^{*}), Brazil (2016^{*}).
9th position, Japan (2020^{*}).
Had its worst performance as hosts
8th position, Great Britain (2012^{*}), Brazil (2016^{*}).
9th position, Japan (2020^{*}).

==== Defending champions ====
Best finish by defending champions
Champions, United States (2016, 2020).
Worst finish by defending champions
Did not participate/qualify, Netherlands (2012).
Worst finish by defending champions that participates in the next tournament
6th position, Italy (2008).

==== Defending runners-up ====
Best finish by defending runners-up
Champions, United States (2012).
Worst finish by defending runners-up
Did not participate/qualify, Italy (2020).
Worst finish by defending runners-up that participates in the next tournament
8th position (last position), Greece (2008).

==== Population ====
Most populous country, participant
China (2020), 1,411,099,000 (source)
Least populous country, participant
Hungary (2020), 9,750,000 (source)
Most populous country, hosts
China (2008^{*}), 1,324,655,000 (source)
Least populous country, hosts
Greece (2004^{*}), 10,955,000 (source)
Most populous country, champions
United States (2020), 331,449,000 (source)
Least populous country, champions
Netherlands (2008), 16,446,000 (source)
Most populous country, runners-up
United States (2008), 304,375,000 (source)
Least populous country, runners-up
Greece (2004^{*}), 10,955,000 (source)
Most populous country, third place
United States (2004), 293,046,000 (source)
Least populous country, third place
Hungary (2020), 9,750,000 (source)
Most populous country, fourth place
Australia (2004), 19,895,000 (source)
Least populous country, fourth place
Hungary (2016), 9,830,485 (source)

== Confederation statistics ==
=== Number of teams by confederation ===
This is a summary of the total number of participating teams by confederation in each tournament. Last updated: 7 August 2021.

Legend

- – Forthcoming tournament

| Confederation | 2000 | 2004 | 2008 | 2012 | 2016 | 2020 | 2024 |
|---|---|---|---|---|---|---|---|
| Africa – CANA | — | — | — | — | — | 1 | — |
| Americas – UANA | 2 | 2 | 1 | 1 | 2 | 2 | 2 |
| Asia – AASF | 1 | 1 | 1 | 1 | 1 | 2 | 1 |
| Europe – LEN | 2 | 4 | 5 | 5 | 4 | 4 | 6 |
| Oceania – OSA | 1 | 1 | 1 | 1 | 1 | 1 | 1 |
| Total teams | 6 | 8 | 8 | 8 | 8 | 10 | 10 |

=== Best performances by tournament ===
This is a summary of the best performances of each confederation in each tournament. Last updated: 7 August 2021.

Legend

- 1st – Champions
- 2nd – Runners-up
- 3rd – Third place
- 4th – Fourth place
- Q – Qualified for forthcoming tournament

| Confederation | 2000 | 2004 | 2008 | 2012 | 2016 | 2020 | 2024 |
|---|---|---|---|---|---|---|---|
| Africa – CANA | — | — | — | — | — | 10th | — |
| Americas – UANA | 2nd | 3rd | 2nd | 1st | 1st | 1st | 4th |
| Asia – AASF | 6th | 8th | 5th | 5th | 7th | 8th | 10th |
| Europe – LEN | 3rd | 1st | 1st | 2nd | 2nd | 2nd | 1st |
| Oceania – OSA | 1st | 4th | 3rd | 3rd | 6th | 5th | 2nd |
| Total teams | 6 | 8 | 8 | 8 | 8 | 10 | 10 |

=== All-time best performances ===
This is a summary of the best performances of each confederation at the Olympics. Last updated: 15 January 2021.

Legend

- Year^{*} – As host team

| Confederation | Best performance | Women's team |
|---|---|---|
| Africa – CANA | 10th | South Africa (2020) |
| Americas – UANA | 1st | United States (2012, 2016, 2020) |
| Asia – AASF | 5th | China (2008^{*}, 2012) |
| Europe – LEN | 1st | Italy (2004), Netherlands (2008) Spain (2024) |
| Oceania – OSA | 1st | Australia (2000^{*}) |

== See also ==
- Water polo at the Summer Olympics
- Lists of Olympic water polo records and statistics
  - List of men's Olympic water polo tournament records and statistics
  - List of women's Olympic water polo tournament records and statistics
  - List of Olympic champions in men's water polo
  - List of Olympic champions in women's water polo
  - National team appearances in the men's Olympic water polo tournament
  - List of players who have appeared in multiple men's Olympic water polo tournaments
  - List of players who have appeared in multiple women's Olympic water polo tournaments
  - List of Olympic medalists in water polo (men)
  - List of Olympic medalists in water polo (women)
  - List of men's Olympic water polo tournament top goalscorers
  - List of women's Olympic water polo tournament top goalscorers
  - List of men's Olympic water polo tournament goalkeepers
  - List of women's Olympic water polo tournament goalkeepers
  - List of Olympic venues in water polo
- FINA Water Polo World Rankings
- List of water polo world medalists
- Major achievements in water polo by nation

== Sources ==
=== Official Results Books (IOC) ===
PDF documents in the LA84 Foundation Digital Library:

- Official Results Book – 2000 Olympic Games – Water Polo (download, archive)
- Official Results Book – 2004 Olympic Games – Water Polo (download, archive)
- Official Results Book – 2008 Olympic Games – Water Polo (download, archive)

PDF documents on the FINA website:

- Official Results Book – 2012 Olympic Games – Diving, Swimming, Synchronised Swimming, Water Polo (archive) (pp. 284–507)

PDF documents in the Olympic World Library:

- Official Results Book – 2016 Olympic Games – Water Polo (archive)

PDF documents on the International Olympic Committee website:

- Official Results Book – 2020 Olympic Games – Water Polo (archive)
- Official Results Book – 2024 Olympic Games – Water Polo

=== Official Reports (FINA) ===
PDF documents on the FINA website:

- HistoFINA – Water polo medalists and statistics (as of September 2019) (archive) (p. 56)
- 1870–2020 | 150 years of Water Polo – Evolution of its rules (archive)

=== Official website (IOC) ===
Water polo on the International Olympic Committee website:

- Water polo
- Women's water polo

=== Olympedia ===
Water polo on the Olympedia website:

- Water polo
- Women's water polo
- Athlete count for water polo
- Water polo venues
- Water polo at the 2000 Summer Olympics (women's tournament)
- Water polo at the 2004 Summer Olympics (women's tournament)
- Water polo at the 2008 Summer Olympics (women's tournament)
- Water polo at the 2012 Summer Olympics (women's tournament)
- Water polo at the 2016 Summer Olympics (women's tournament)
- Water polo at the 2020 Summer Olympics (women's tournament)

=== Sports Reference ===
Water polo on the Sports Reference website:

- Country Medal Leaders & Athlete Medal Leaders (1900–2016) (archived)
- Women's water polo (2000–2016) (archived)
- Water polo at the 2000 Summer Games (women's tournament) (archived)
- Water polo at the 2004 Summer Games (women's tournament) (archived)
- Water polo at the 2008 Summer Games (women's tournament) (archived)
- Water polo at the 2012 Summer Games (women's tournament) (archived)
- Water polo at the 2016 Summer Games (women's tournament) (archived)

=== Todor66 ===
Water polo on the Todor66 website:

- Water polo at the Summer Games
- Water polo at the 2000 Summer Olympics (women's tournament, women's qualification)
- Water polo at the 2004 Summer Olympics (women's tournament, women's qualification)
- Water polo at the 2008 Summer Olympics (women's tournament, women's qualification)
- Water polo at the 2012 Summer Olympics (women's tournament, women's qualification)
- Water polo at the 2016 Summer Olympics (women's tournament, women's qualification)
- Water polo at the 2020 Summer Olympics (women's tournament, women's qualification)
