= African Diving Championships =

Diving competition

- Most recent season or competition: 2023 African Diving Championships
- Sport: Diving
- Founded: 2019
- Founder: CANA
- Continent: Africa
- Most recent champion: Egypt (2)
- Most titles: Egypt (2)

The African Diving Championships are a diving competition organized every four years by Africa Aquatics since 2019.

The first two editions each served as qualification events for the Olympic Games held the following year.

== Editions ==
Year	Edition	Host city	Best Nation
2019	1st edition	Durban, South Africa	Egypt
2023	2nd edition	Durban, South Africa	Egypt
