= List of women's Olympic water polo tournament records and statistics =

This is a list of records and statistics of the women's Olympic water polo tournament since the inaugural official edition in 2000.

== Abbreviations ==
Rk	Rank	Ref	Reference	(C)	Captain
Pos	Playing position	FP	Field player	GK	Goalkeeper
L/R	Handedness	L	Left-handed	R	Right-handed
p.	page	pp.	pages		

== General statistics ==
This is a summary of women's water polo at the Summer Olympics by tournament.

The following table shows winning teams, coaches and captains by tournament. Last updated: 31 August 2024.

Legend

- Team – Olympic winning streak (winning three or more Olympic titles in a row)
- Team – Winning all matches during the tournament
- Team – Host team
- Team^{†} – Defunct team

Winning teams, coaches and captains by tournament
#	Women's tournament	Winning team	Winning coach	Winning captain
1	Sydney 2000	Australia (1st title)	(Hungary) István Görgényi	—N/a
2	Athens 2004	Italy (1st title)	(Italy) Pierluigi Formiconi	(Italy) Carmela Allucci
3	Beijing 2008	Netherlands (1st title)	(Netherlands) Robin van Galen	(Netherlands) Yasemin Smit
4	London 2012	United States (1st title)	(United States) Adam Krikorian	(United States) Brenda Villa
5	Rio 2016	United States (2nd title)	(United States) Adam Krikorian (2)	(United States) Maggie Steffens
6	Tokyo 2020	United States (3rd title)	(United States) Adam Krikorian (3)	(United States) Maggie Steffens (2)
7	Paris 2024	Spain (1st title)	(Spain) Miki Oca	(Spain) Pili Peña

The following table shows top goalscorers, goalkeepers, sprinters and Most Valuable Players by tournament. Last updated: 31 August 2024.

Notes:

- Top goalscorer: the water polo player who scored the most goals in a tournament.
- Top goalkeeper: the water polo player who saved the most shots in a tournament.
- Top sprinter: the water polo player who won the most sprints in a tournament.
- Most Valuable Player: the water polo player who was named the Most Valuable Player of a tournament.

Legend and abbreviation

- Team – Olympic winning streak
- Team – Winning all matches during the tournament
- Team – Host team
- Team^{†} – Defunct team
- Player^{‡} – Player who won the tournament with her team
- Eff % – Save efficiency (Saves / Shots)

Top goalscorers, goalkeepers, sprinters and Most Valuable Players by tournament
Year	Winning team	Top goalscorer (Goals)	Top goalkeeper (Saves, Eff %)	Top sprinter (Sprints won)	Most Valuable Player (Goals or Saves, Eff %)
2000	Australia	(Netherlands) Daniëlle de Bruijn (11) (Australia) Bridgette Gusterson^{‡} (11) (Russia) Sofia Konukh (11)	(Netherlands) Karla Plugge (45, 55.6%)	(Russia) Tatiana Petrova (16)	—N/a
2004	Italy	(Italy) Tania Di Mario^{‡} (14)	(United States) Jacqueline Frank (41, 60.3%)	(Greece) Kyriaki Liosi (21)	(Italy) Tania Di Mario^{‡} (14 goals)
2008	Netherlands	(Netherlands) Daniëlle de Bruijn^{‡} (17)	(United States) Elizabeth Armstrong (49, 53.3%)	(China) Wang Yi (18)	—N/a
2012	United States	(United States) Maggie Steffens^{‡} (21)	(Italy) Elena Gigli (56, 53.3%)	(Australia) Kate Gynther (21) (Spain) Jennifer Pareja (21)	(United States) Maggie Steffens^{‡} (21 goals)
2016	United States	(United States) Maggie Steffens^{‡} (17)	(Italy) Giulia Gorlero (65, 61.3%)	(United States) Rachel Fattal^{‡} (17)	(United States) Maggie Steffens^{‡} (17 goals)
2020	United States	(Netherlands) Simone van de Kraats (28)	(United States) Ashleigh Johnson^{‡} (80, 64.5%)	(Hungary) Vanda Vályi (27)	(United States) Maddie Musselman^{‡} (18 goals)
2024	Spain	(Australia) Alice Williams (21)	(United States) Ashleigh Johnson (80, 63%)	(Hungary) Vanda Vályi (22)	(Australia) Alice Williams (21 goals)

== Confederation statistics ==
=== Best performances by tournament ===
This is a summary of the best performances of each confederation in each tournament. Last updated: 7 August 2021.

Legend

- 1st – Champions
- 2nd – Runners-up
- 3rd – Third place
- 4th – Fourth place
- Q – Qualified for forthcoming tournament

Confederation	2000	2004	2008	2012	2016	2020	2024
Africa – CANA	—	—	—	—	—	10th	—
Americas – UANA	2nd	3rd	2nd	1st	1st	1st	4th
Asia – AASF	6th	8th	5th	5th	7th	8th	10th
Europe – LEN	3rd	1st	1st	2nd	2nd	2nd	1st
Oceania – OSA	1st	4th	3rd	3rd	6th	5th	2nd
Total teams	6	8	8	8	8	10	10

=== All-time best performances ===
This is a summary of the best performances of each confederation at the Olympics. Last updated: 15 January 2021.

Legend

- Year^{*} – As host team

Confederation	Best performance	Women's team
Africa – CANA	10th	South Africa (2020)
Americas – UANA	1st	United States (2012, 2016, 2020)
Asia – AASF	5th	China (2008^{*}, 2012)
Europe – LEN	1st	Italy (2004), Netherlands (2008) Spain (2024)
Oceania – OSA	1st	Australia (2000^{*})

== Team statistics ==
=== Comprehensive team results by tournament ===
Note: Results of Olympic qualification tournaments are not included.

Legend

- 1st – Champions
- 2nd – Runners-up
- 3rd – Third place
- 4th – Fourth place
- Q – Qualified for forthcoming tournament
- – Hosts

Abbreviation

- stats – Olympic water polo team statistics

Africa – CANA (1 team)
Women's team	2000	2004	2008	2012	2016	2020	2024	Years
South Africa						10th	WD	1
Americas – UANA (3 teams)
Women's team	2000	2004	2008	2012	2016	2020	2024	Years
Brazil					8th			1
Canada (stats)	5th	7th				7th	8th	4
United States (stats)	2nd	3rd	2nd	1st	1st	1st	4th	7
Asia – AASF (3 teams)
Women's team	2000	2004	2008	2012	2016	2020	2024	Years
China (stats)			5th	5th	7th	8th	10th	5
Japan						9th		1
Kazakhstan	6th	8th						2
Europe – LEN (9 teams)
Women's team	2000	2004	2008	2012	2016	2020	2024	Years
France							9th	1
Great Britain				8th				1
Greece (stats)		2nd	8th				7th	3
Hungary (stats)		6th	4th	4th	4th	3rd	5th	6
Italy (stats)		1st	6th	7th	2nd		6th	5
Netherlands (stats)	4th		1st			6th	3rd	4
ROC (stats)						4th		1
Russia (stats)	3rd	5th	7th	6th	3rd			5
Spain (stats)				2nd	5th	2nd	1st	4
Oceania – OSA (1 team)
Women's team	2000	2004	2008	2012	2016	2020	2024	Years
Australia (stats)	1st	4th	3rd	3rd	6th	5th	2nd	7
Total teams	6	8	8	8	8	10	10	

=== Number of appearances by team ===
The following table is pre-sorted by number of appearances (in descending order), year of the last appearance (in ascending order), year of the first appearance (in ascending order), name of the team (in ascending order), respectively. Last updated: 7 August 2021.

Legend and abbreviation

- Year^{*} – As host team
- Apps – Appearances
- stats – Olympic water polo team statistics

Number of appearances by team
Rk	Women's team	Apps	Record streak	Active streak	Debut	Most recent	Best finish	Confederation
1	Australia (stats)	7	7	7	2000^{*}	2024	Champions	Oceania – OSA
1	United States (stats)	6	7	7	2000	2024	Champions	Americas – UANA
3	Russia (stats)	6	6	0	2000	2020	Third place	Europe – LEN
3	Hungary (stats)	6	6	6	2004	2024	Fourth place	Europe – LEN
6	Italy (stats)	5	4	1	2004	2024	Champions	Europe – LEN
6	China (stats)	5	5	5	2008^{*}	2024	Fifth place	Asia – AASF
7	Canada (stats)	4	2	2	2000	2024	Fifth place	Americas – UANA
7	Netherlands (stats)	4	2	2	2000	2024	Champions	Europe – LEN
7	Spain (stats)	4	4	4	2012	2024	Champions	Europe – LEN
10	Greece (stats)	3	2	1	2004^{*}	2024	Runners-up	Europe – LEN
11	Kazakhstan	2	2	0	2000	2004	Sixth place	Asia – AASF
12	Great Britain	1	1	0	2012^{*}	2012^{*}	Eighth place	Europe – LEN
12	Brazil	1	1	0	2016^{*}	2016^{*}	Eighth place	Americas – UANA
12	Japan	1	1	0	2020^{*}	2020^{*}	Ninth place	Asia – AASF
12	South Africa	1	1	0	2020	2020	Tenth place	Africa – CANA
12	France	1	1	1	2024^{*}	2024^{*}	Ninth place	Europe – LEN
Rk	Women's team	Apps	Record streak	Active streak	Debut	Most recent	Best finish	Confederation

=== Best finishes by team ===
The following table is pre-sorted by best finish (in descending order), name of the team (in ascending order), respectively. Last updated: 7 August 2024.

Legend and abbreviation

- Year^{*} – As host team
- Apps – Appearances
- stats – Olympic water polo team statistics

Best finishes by team
Rk	Women's team	Best finish	Apps	Confederation
1	United States (stats)	Champions (2002, 2006)	7	Americas – UANA
2	Australia (stats)	Champions (2000^{*})	7	Oceania – OSA
2	Italy (stats)	Champions (2004)	5	Europe – LEN
2	Netherlands (stats)	Champions (2008)	4	Europe – LEN
2	Spain (stats)	Champions (2024)	4	Europe – LEN
6	Greece (stats)	Runners-up (2004^{*})	3	Europe – LEN
7	Russia (stats)	Third place (2000, 2016)	6	Europe – LEN
8	Hungary (stats)	Fourth place (2008, 2012, 2016)	6	Europe – LEN
9	China (stats)	Fifth place (2008^{*}, 2012)	5	Asia – AASF
10	Canada (stats)	Fifth place (2000)	4	Americas – UANA
11	Kazakhstan	Sixth place (2000)	2	Asia – AASF
12	Brazil	Eighth place (2016^{*})	1	Americas – UANA
12	Great Britain	Eighth place (2012^{*})	1	Europe – LEN
14	Japan	Ninth place (2020^{*})	1	Asia – AASF
14	France	Eighth place (2024^{*})	1	Europe – LEN
15	South Africa	Tenth place (2020)	1	Africa – CANA
Rk	Women's team	Best finish	Apps	Confederation

=== Finishes in the top four ===
The following table is pre-sorted by total finishes in the top four (in descending order), number of Olympic gold medals (in descending order), number of Olympic silver medals (in descending order), number of Olympic bronze medals (in descending order), name of the team (in ascending order), respectively. Last updated: 7 August 2021.

Legend

- Year^{*} – As host team

Rk	Women's team	Total	Champions	Runners-up	Third place	Fourth place	First	Last
1	United States	6	3 (2012, 2016, 2020)	2 (2000, 2008)	1 (2004)	1 (2024)	2000	2024
2	Australia	5	1 (2000^{*})	1 (2024)	3 (2008, 2012)	1 (2004)	2000	2024
3	Hungary	4			1 (2020)	3 (2008, 2012, 2016)	2008	2020
4	Spain	3	1 (2024)	2 (2012, 2020)			2012	2024
5	Netherlands	3	1 (2008)		1 (2024)	1 (2000)	2000	2024
6	Italy	2	1 (2004)	1 (2016)			2004	2016
7	Russia	2			2 (2000, 2016)		2000	2016
8	Greece	1		1 (2004^{*})			2004	2004
9	ROC	1				1 (2020)	2020	2020
Rk	Women's team	Total	Champions	Runners-up	Third place	Fourth place	First	Last

=== Medal table ===
The following table is pre-sorted by number of Olympic gold medals (in descending order), number of Olympic silver medals (in descending order), number of Olympic bronze medals (in descending order), name of the team (in ascending order), respectively. Last updated: 7 August 2021.

The United States is the most successful country in the women's Olympic water polo tournament, with three gold, two silver and one bronze.

Rank	Women's team	Gold	Silver	Bronze	Total
1	United States (USA)	3	2	1	6
2	Spain (ESP)	1	2	0	3
3	Australia (AUS)	1	1	2	4
4	Italy (ITA)	1	1	0	2
5	Netherlands (NED)	1	0	1	2
6	Greece (GRE)	0	1	0	1
7	Russia (RUS)	0	0	2	2
8	Hungary (HUN)	0	0	1	1
Totals (8 entries)		7	7	7	21

=== Champions (results) ===
The following table shows results of Olympic champions in women's water polo by tournament. Last updated: 7 August 2021.

Legend

- 6 – Winning 6 matches during the tournament
- 4 – Drawing 4 matches during the tournament
- 2 – Losing 2 matches during the tournament
- 100.0% – Winning all matches during the tournament
- Team – Olympic winning streak (winning three or more Olympic titles in a row)
- Team – Host team

Abbreviation

- MP – Matches played
- W – Won
- D – Drawn
- L – Lost
- GF – Goals for
- GA – Goals against
- GD – Goals difference
- GF/MP – Goals for per match
- GA/MP – Goals against per match
- GD/MP – Goals difference per match

Results of champions by tournament
#	Women's tournament	Champions	MP	W	D	L	Win %	GF	GA	GD	GF/MP	GA/MP	GD/MP
1	Sydney 2000	Australia (1st title)	7	6	0	1	85.7%	46	29	17	6.571	4.143	2.429
2	Athens 2004	Italy (1st title)	6	5	0	1	83.3%	44	33	11	7.333	5.500	1.833
3	Beijing 2008	Netherlands (1st title)	6	4	0	2	66.7%	57	53	4	9.500	8.833	0.667
4	London 2012	United States (1st title)	6	5	1	0	83.3%	58	48	10	9.667	8.000	1.667
5	Rio 2016	United States (2nd title)	6	6	0	0	100.0%	73	32	41	12.167	5.333	6.833
6	Tokyo 2020	United States (3rd title)	7	6	0	1	85.7%	109	47	62	15.571	6.714	8.857
7	Paris 2024	Spain (1st title)	7	7	0	0	100.0%	94	67	27	13.428	9.571	3.857
#	Women's tournament	Total	45	39	1	5	86.6%	481	309	172	10.688	6.866	3.822
#	Women's tournament	Champions	MP	W	D	L	Win %	GF	GA	GD	GF/MP	GA/MP	GD/MP

Sources:

- Official Results Books (PDF): 2000 (p. 96), 2004 (p. 72), 2008 (p. 71), 2012 (p. 368), 2016 (p. 218), 2020 (p. 273);
- Olympedia: 2000–2020 (women's tournaments).

The following table shows women's teams that won all matches during the Olympic tournament.

Winning all matches during the tournament
#	Year	Champions	MP	W	D	L	Win %
1	2016	United States (2nd title)	6	6	0	0	100.0%
2	2024	Spain	7	7	0	0	100.0%

The following tables show records of goals for per match.

Top 3 most goals for per match
Rk	Year	Champions	MP	GF	GF/MP
1	2020	United States (3rd title)	7	109	15.571
2	2024	Spain (1st title)	7	94	13.428
3	2016	United States (2nd title)	6	73	12.167

Top 3 fewest goals for per match
Rk	Year	Champions	MP	GF	GF/MP
1	2000	Australia (1st title)	7	46	6.571
2	2004	Italy (1st title)	6	44	7.333
3	2008	Netherlands (1st title)	6	57	9.500

Historical progression of records: Goals for per match
Goals for per match	Achievement	Year	Champions	Date of winning gold	Duration of record
6.571	Set record	2000	Australia (1st title)	23 September 2000	3 years, 338 days
7.333	Broke record	2004	Italy (1st title)	26 August 2004	3 years, 361 days
9.500	Broke record	2008	Netherlands (1st title)	21 August 2008	3 years, 354 days
9.667	Broke record	2012	United States (1st title)	9 August 2012	4 years, 10 days
12.167	Broke record	2016	United States (2nd title)	19 August 2016	4 years, 353 days
15.571	Broke record	2020	United States (3rd title)	7 August 2021	5 years, 3 days

The following tables show records of goals against per match.

Top 3 most goals against per match
Rk	Year	Champions	MP	GA	GA/MP
1	2024	Spain (1st title)	7	67	9.571
2	2008	Netherlands (1st title)	6	53	8.833
3	2012	United States (1st title)	6	48	8.000

Top 3 fewest goals against per match
Rk	Year	Champions	MP	GA	GA/MP
1	2000	Australia (1st title)	7	29	4.143
2	2016	United States (2nd title)	6	32	5.333
3	2004	Italy (1st title)	6	33	5.500

The following tables show records of goals difference per match.

Top 3 most goals difference per match
Rk	Year	Champions	MP	GD	GD/MP
1	2020	United States (3rd title)	7	62	8.857
2	2016	United States (2nd title)	6	41	6.833
3	2000	Australia (1st title)	7	17	2.429

Top 3 fewest goals difference per match
Rk	Year	Champions	MP	GD	GD/MP
1	2008	Netherlands (1st title)	6	4	0.667
2	2012	United States (1st title)	6	10	1.667
3	2004	Italy (1st title)	6	11	1.833

=== Champions (squads) ===
The following table shows number of players and average age, height and weight of Olympic champions in women's water polo by tournament. Last updated: 7 August 2021.

Legend

- Team – Olympic winning streak
- Team – Winning all matches during the tournament
- Team – Host team

Winning squads by tournament
#	Women's tournament	Champions	Players	Returning Olympians		Average		
#	Women's tournament	Champions	Number	Number	%	Age	Height	Weight
1	Sydney 2000	Australia (1st title)	13	0	0.0%	26 years, 215 days	1.78 m (5 ft 10 in)	71 kg (157 lb)
2	Athens 2004	Italy (1st title)	13	0	0.0%	28 years, 301 days	1.73 m (5 ft 8 in)	67 kg (148 lb)
3	Beijing 2008	Netherlands (1st title)	13	2	15.4%	25 years, 248 days	1.77 m (5 ft 10 in)	70 kg (154 lb)
4	London 2012	United States (1st title)	13	8	61.5%	26 years, 96 days	1.80 m (5 ft 11 in)	77 kg (170 lb)
5	Rio 2016	United States (2nd title)	13	4	30.8%	23 years, 200 days	1.80 m (5 ft 11 in)	77 kg (170 lb)
6	Tokyo 2020	United States (3rd title)	13	8	61.5%	26 years, 33 days	1.79 m (5 ft 10 in)	
6	Paris 2024	Spain (1st title)	13	8	61.5%			
#	Women's tournament	Champions	Number	Number	%	Age	Height	Weight
#	Women's tournament	Champions	Players	Returning Olympians		Average		

Sources:

- Official Results Books (PDF): 2000 (p. 96), 2004 (p. 73), 2008 (p. 72), 2012 (p. 369), 2016 (p. 219), 2020 (p. 274);
- Olympedia: 2000–2020 (women's tournaments).

The following tables show records of the number of returning Olympians.

Records – number of returning Olympians (in descending order)
Rk	Year	Champions	Players	Returning Olympians	
Rk	Year	Champions	Number	Number	%
1	2012	United States (1st title)	13	8	61.5%
1	2020	United States (3rd title)	13	8	61.5%
3	2016	Spain (1st title)	13	8	61.5%

Records – number of returning Olympians (in ascending order)
Rk	Year	Champions	Players	Returning Olympians	
Rk	Year	Champions	Number	Number	%
1	2000	Australia (1st title)	13	0	0.0%
1	2004	Italy (1st title)	13	0	0.0%
3	2008	Netherlands (1st title)	13	2	15.4%

The following tables show records of average age.

Top 3 oldest winning squads
Rk	Year	Champions	Average age
1	2004	Italy (1st title)	28 years, 301 days
2	2000	Australia (1st title)	26 years, 215 days
3	2012	United States (1st title)	26 years, 96 days

Top 3 youngest winning squads
Rk	Year	Champions	Average age
1	2016	United States (2nd title)	23 years, 200 days
2	2008	Netherlands (1st title)	25 years, 248 days
3	2020	United States (3rd title)	26 years, 33 days

The following tables show records of average height.

Top 3 tallest winning squads
Rk	Year	Champions	Average height
1	2012	United States (1st title)	1.80 m (5 ft 11 in)
1	2016	United States (2nd title)	1.80 m (5 ft 11 in)
3	2020	United States (3rd title)	1.79 m (5 ft 10 in)

Top 3 shortest winning squads
Rk	Year	Champions	Average height
1	2004	Italy (1st title)	1.73 m (5 ft 8 in)
2	2008	Netherlands (1st title)	1.77 m (5 ft 10 in)
3	2000	Australia (1st title)	1.78 m (5 ft 10 in)

Historical progression of records: Average height
Average height	Achievement	Year	Champions	Date of winning gold	Duration of record
1.78 m (5 ft 10 in)	Set record	2000	Australia (1st title)	23 September 2000	11 years, 321 days
1.80 m (5 ft 11 in)	Broke record	2012	United States (1st title)	9 August 2012	14 years, 1 day
1.80 m (5 ft 11 in)	Tied record	2016	United States (2nd title)	19 August 2016	14 years, 1 day

The following tables show records of average weight.

Top 3 heaviest winning squads
Rk	Year	Champions	Average weight
1	2012	United States (1st title)	77 kg (170 lb)
1	2016	United States (2nd title)	77 kg (170 lb)
3	2000	Australia (1st title)	71 kg (157 lb)

Top 3 lightest winning squads
Rk	Year	Champions	Average weight
1	2004	Italy (1st title)	67 kg (148 lb)
2	2008	Netherlands (1st title)	70 kg (154 lb)
3	2000	Australia (1st title)	71 kg (157 lb)

Historical progression of records: Average weight
Average weight	Achievement	Year	Champions	Date of winning gold	Duration of record
71 kg (157 lb)	Set record	2000	Australia (1st title)	23 September 2000	11 years, 321 days
77 kg (170 lb)	Broke record	2012	United States (1st title)	9 August 2012	14 years, 1 day
77 kg (170 lb)	Tied record	2016	United States (2nd title)	19 August 2016	14 years, 1 day

=== Team records ===
Teams having equal quantities in the tables below are ordered by the tournament the quantity was attained in (the teams that attained the quantity first are listed first). If the quantity was attained by more than one team in the same tournament, these teams are ordered alphabetically. Last updated: 7 August 2021.

Legend

- Year^{*} – As host team

==== Appearances ====
Most appearances
6, Australia, United States (have participated in every tournament).
Most appearances, never winning a title
5, Russia (has participated in every tournament).
Most appearances, never finishing in the top two
5, Russia (has participated in every tournament).
Most appearances, never winning a medal
4, China (2008^{*}, 2012, 2016, 2020).
Most appearances, never finishing in the top four
4, China (2008^{*}, 2012, 2016, 2020).
Fewest appearances
1, Great Britain (2012^{*}), Brazil (2016^{*}), Japan (2020^{*}), ROC (2020), South Africa (2020).
Fewest appearances, winning a title
3, Netherlands (2008).
Fewest appearances, finishing in the top two
2, Greece (2004^{*}).
Fewest appearances, winning a medal
2, Greece (2004^{*}).
Fewest appearances, finishing in the top four
2, Greece (2004^{*}).

==== Top four ====
Most titles won
3, United States (2012, 2016, 2020).
Most second-place finishes
2, United States (2000, 2008), Spain (2012, 2020).
Most third-place finishes
2, Australia (2008, 2012), Russia (2000, 2016).
Most fourth-place finishes
3, Hungary (2008, 2012, 2016).
Most finishes in the top two
5, United States (2000, 2008, 2012, 2016, 2020).
Most finishes in the top two, never winning a title
2, Spain (2012, 2020).
Most finishes in the top three
6, United States (has been medaled in every tournament).
Most finishes in the top three, never winning a title
2, Russia (2000, 2016), Spain (2012, 2020).
Most finishes in the top three, never finishing in the top two
2, Russia (2000, 2016).
Most finishes in the top four
6, United States (has finished in the top four in every tournament).
Most finishes in the top four, never winning a title
4, Hungary (2008, 2012, 2016, 2020).
Most finishes in the top four, never finishing in the top two
4, Hungary (2008, 2012, 2016, 2020).
Most finishes in the top four, never winning a medal
1, ROC (2020).
Fewest finishes in the top two, winning a title
1, Australia (2000^{*}), Netherlands (2008).
Fewest finishes in the top three, winning a title
1, Netherlands (2008).
Fewest finishes in the top three, finishing in the top two
1, Greece (2004^{*}), Netherlands (2008).
Fewest finishes in the top four, winning a title
2, Netherlands (2000, 2008), Italy (2004, 2016).
Fewest finishes in the top four, finishing in the top two
1, Greece (2004^{*}).
Fewest finishes in the top four, winning a medal
1, Greece (2004^{*}).

==== Consecutive ====
Most consecutive titles won
3, United States (2012–2016–2020).
Most consecutive second-place finishes
None.
Most consecutive third-place finishes
2, Australia (2008–2012).
Most consecutive fourth-place finishes
3, Hungary (2008–2012–2016).
Most consecutive finishes in the top two
4, United States (2008–2012–2016–2020).
Most consecutive finishes in the top three
6, United States (has been medaled in every tournament).
Most consecutive finishes in the top four
6, United States (has finished in the top four in every tournament).
Most consecutive appearances
6, Australia, United States (have participated in every tournament).
Biggest improvement in position in consecutive tournaments
Did not participate/qualify, then won the title, Italy (2000–2004), Netherlands (2004–2008).

==== Gaps ====
Longest gap between successive titles
None.
Longest gap between successive second-place finishes
9 years, Spain (2012, 2020).
Longest gap between successive third-place finishes
16 years, Russia (2000, 2016).
Longest gap between successive fourth-place finishes
None.
Longest gap between successive appearances in the top two
12 years, Italy (2004–2016).
Longest gap between successive appearances in the top three
16 years, Russia (2000–2016).
Longest gap between successive appearances in the top four
16 years, Russia (2000–2016).
Longest gap between successive appearances
17 years, Canada (2004–2020).

==== Debuting teams ====
Best finish by a debuting team
Champions, Australia (2000^{*}), Italy (2004).
Worst finish by a debuting team
10th position (last position), South Africa (2020).

==== Host teams ====
Best finish by host team
Champions: Australia (2000^{*}).
Worst finish by host team
9th position, Japan (2020^{*}).
Best finish by last host team
4th position, Australia (2004).
Worst finish by last host team
Did not participate/qualify, Great Britain (2016), Brazil (2020).
Worst finish by last host team that participates in the tournament
8th position (last position), Greece (2008).
Had its best performance as hosts
Champions, Australia (2000^{*}).
Runners-up, Greece (2004^{*}).
5th position, China (2008^{*}).
8th position, Great Britain (2012^{*}), Brazil (2016^{*}).
9th position, Japan (2020^{*}).
Had its worst performance as hosts
8th position, Great Britain (2012^{*}), Brazil (2016^{*}).
9th position, Japan (2020^{*}).

==== Defending champions ====
Best finish by defending champions
Champions, United States (2016, 2020).
Worst finish by defending champions
Did not participate/qualify, Netherlands (2012).
Worst finish by defending champions that participates in the next tournament
6th position, Italy (2008).

==== Defending runners-up ====
Best finish by defending runners-up
Champions, United States (2012).
Worst finish by defending runners-up
Did not participate/qualify, Italy (2020).
Worst finish by defending runners-up that participates in the next tournament
8th position (last position), Greece (2008).

==== Population ====
Most populous country, participant
China (2020), 1,411,099,000 (source)
Least populous country, participant
Hungary (2020), 9,750,000 (source)
Most populous country, hosts
China (2008^{*}), 1,324,655,000 (source)
Least populous country, hosts
Greece (2004^{*}), 10,955,000 (source)
Most populous country, champions
United States (2020), 331,449,000 (source)
Least populous country, champions
Netherlands (2008), 16,446,000 (source)
Most populous country, runners-up
United States (2008), 304,375,000 (source)
Least populous country, runners-up
Greece (2004^{*}), 10,955,000 (source)
Most populous country, third place
United States (2004), 293,046,000 (source)
Least populous country, third place
Hungary (2020), 9,750,000 (source)
Most populous country, fourth place
Australia (2004), 19,895,000 (source)
Least populous country, fourth place
Hungary (2016), 9,830,485 (source)

== Player statistics ==
=== Age records ===
The following tables show the oldest and youngest players who competed in women's water polo at the Summer Olympics, and the oldest and youngest female Olympic medalists in water polo. Last updated: 12 August 2021.

Legend

- Team – Host team
- Player^{‡} – Player who won the tournament with her team

Appearance

Record	Age of the first Olympic water polo match	Player	Women's team	Pos	Date of birth	Date of the first Olympic water polo match	Ref
Oldest Olympic debutante	41 years, 150 days	Camila Pedrosa	Brazil	FP	12 March 1975	9 August 2016	
Youngest female Olympian	16 years, 104 days	Paula Leitón	Spain	FP	27 April 2000	9 August 2016	

Record	Age of the last Olympic water polo match	Player	Women's team	Pos	Date of birth	Date of the last Olympic water polo match	Ref
Oldest female Olympian	41 years, 160 days	Camila Pedrosa	Brazil	FP	12 March 1975	19 August 2016	

Medalist

Record	Age of winning the last Olympic gold/silver/bronze medal in water polo	Player	Women's team	Pos	Date of birth	Date of receiving the last Olympic gold/silver/bronze medal in water polo	Ref
Oldest female Olympic gold medalist	36 years, 348 days	Gillian van den Berg^{‡}	Netherlands	FP	8 September 1971	21 August 2008	
Oldest female Olympic silver medalist	39 years, 183 days	Maureen O'Toole	United States	FP	24 March 1961	23 September 2000	
Oldest female Olympic bronze medalist	33 years, 153 days	Gabriella Szűcs	Hungary	FP	7 March 1988	7 August 2021	

Record	Age of winning the first Olympic gold/silver/bronze medal in water polo	Player	Women's team	Pos	Date of birth	Date of receiving the first Olympic gold/silver/bronze medal in water polo	Ref
Youngest female Olympic gold medalist	17 years, 170 days	Aria Fischer^{‡}	United States	FP	2 March 1999	19 August 2016	
Youngest female Olympic silver medalist	16 years, 282 days	Elena Ruiz	Spain	FP	29 October 2004	7 August 2021	
Youngest female Olympic bronze medalist	19 years, 22 days	Maria Borisova	Russia	FP	28 July 1997	19 August 2016	

=== Multiple appearances (four-time Olympians) ===
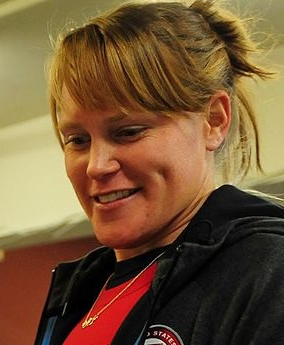
American water polo player Heather Petri competed at four Olympics (2000–2012).

The following table is pre-sorted by number of Olympic appearances (in descending order), year of the last Olympic appearance (in ascending order), year of the first Olympic appearance (in ascending order), date of birth (in ascending order), name of the player (in ascending order), respectively. Last updated: 7 August 2021.

Eight female athletes competed in water polo at four or more Olympic Games between 2000 and 2020 inclusive.

Legend

- – Hosts
- Apps – Appearances

Female athletes who competed in water polo at four or more Olympics
Apps	Player	Birth	Height	Women's team	Pos	Water polo tournaments					Period (age of first/last)	Medals				Ref
Apps	Player	Birth	Height	Women's team	Pos	1	2	3	4	5	Period (age of first/last)	G	S	B	T	Ref
4	Heather Petri	1978	1.80 m (5 ft 11 in)	United States	FP	2000	2004	2008	2012		12 years (22/34)	1	2	1	4	
4	Sofia Konukh	1980	1.73 m (5 ft 8 in)	Russia	FP	2000	2004	2008	2012		12 years (20/32)	0	0	1	1	
4	Brenda Villa	1980	1.63 m (5 ft 4 in)	United States	FP	2000	2004	2008	2012		12 years (20/32)	1	2	1	4	
4	Tania Di Mario	1979	1.68 m (5 ft 6 in)	Italy	FP	2004	2008	2012	2016		12 years (25/37)	1	1	0	2	
4	Bronwen Knox	1986	1.82 m (6 ft 0 in)	Australia	FP	2008	2012	2016	2020		13 years (22/35)	0	0	2	2	
4	Nadezhda Glyzina	1988	1.75 m (5 ft 9 in)	Russia	FP	2008	2012	2016			13 years (20/33)	0	0	1	1	
4	Nadezhda Glyzina	1988	1.75 m (5 ft 9 in)	ROC	FP				2020		13 years (20/33)	0	0	1	1	
4	Evgenia Soboleva	1988	1.80 m (5 ft 11 in)	Russia	FP	2008	2012	2016			13 years (19/32)	0	0	1	1	
4	Evgenia Soboleva	1988	1.80 m (5 ft 11 in)	ROC	FP				2020		13 years (19/32)	0	0	1	1	
4	Ekaterina Prokofyeva	1991	1.76 m (5 ft 9 in)	Russia	FP	2008	2012	2016			13 years (17/30)	0	0	1	1	
4	Ekaterina Prokofyeva	1991	1.76 m (5 ft 9 in)	ROC	FP				2020		13 years (17/30)	0	0	1	1	
Apps	Player	Birth	Height	Women's team	Pos	1	2	3	4	5	Period (age of first/last)	G	S	B	T	Ref
Apps	Player	Birth	Height	Women's team	Pos	Water polo tournaments					Period (age of first/last)	Medals				Ref

=== Multiple medalists ===
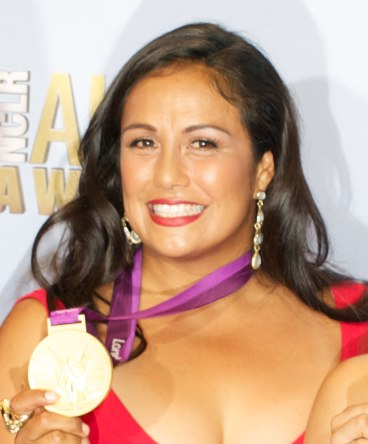
Brenda Villa of the United States won four Olympic medals in water polo between 2000 and 2012.

The following table is pre-sorted by total number of Olympic medals (in descending order), number of Olympic gold medals (in descending order), number of Olympic silver medals (in descending order), year of receiving the last Olympic medal (in ascending order), year of receiving the first Olympic medal (in ascending order), name of the player (in ascending order), respectively. Last updated: 7 August 2021.

Heather Petri and Brenda Villa, both representing the United States, are the only two female athletes to win four Olympic medals in water polo.

Legend

- – Hosts

Female athletes who won four or more Olympic medals in water polo
Rk	Player	Birth	Height	Women's team	Pos	Water polo tournaments					Period (age of first/last)	Medals				Ref
Rk	Player	Birth	Height	Women's team	Pos	1	2	3	4	5	Period (age of first/last)	G	S	B	T	Ref
1	Heather Petri	1978	1.80 m (5 ft 11 in)	United States	FP	2000	2004	2008	2012		12 years (22/34)	1	2	1	4	
1	Brenda Villa	1980	1.63 m (5 ft 4 in)	United States	FP	2000	2004	2008	2012		12 years (20/32)	1	2	1	4	

Sources:

- Sports Reference: Athlete Medal Leaders (1900–2016);
- Official Results Books (PDF): 2000 (p. 28), 2004 (p. 2), 2008 (p. 2), 2012 (p. 285), 2016 (p. 135), 2020 (p. 156).

=== Multiple gold medalists ===
The following table is pre-sorted by number of Olympic gold medals (in descending order), number of Olympic silver medals (in descending order), number of Olympic bronze medals (in descending order), year of receiving the last Olympic gold medal (in ascending order), year of receiving the first Olympic gold medal (in ascending order), name of the player (in ascending order), respectively. Last updated: 7 August 2021.

Two female athletes won three or more Olympic gold medals in water polo. They were both members of the United States women's national water polo team that won three consecutive Olympic gold medals in 2012, 2016 and 2021.

Legend

- – Hosts

Female athletes who won three or more Olympic gold medals in water polo
Rk	Player	Birth	Height	Women's team	Pos	Water polo tournaments					Period (age of first/last)	Medals				Ref
Rk	Player	Birth	Height	Women's team	Pos	1	2	3	4	5	Period (age of first/last)	G	S	B	T	Ref
1	Melissa Seidemann	1990	1.83 m (6 ft 0 in)	United States	FP	2012	2016	2020			9 years (22/31)	3	0	0	3	
1	Maggie Steffens	1993	1.73 m (5 ft 8 in)	United States	FP	2012	2016	2020			9 years (19/28)	3	0	0	3	

=== Top goalscorers (one match) ===
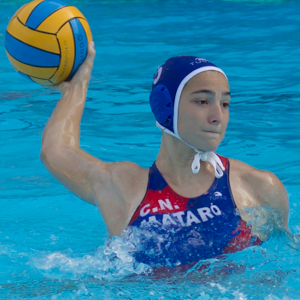
Roser Tarragó of Spain is one of three female players to score seven goals in an Olympic match.

The following table is pre-sorted by date of the match (in ascending order), name of the player (in ascending order), respectively. Last updated: 1 April 2021.

Three female water polo players have each scored seven goals in an Olympic match.

The first woman to do so was Daniëlle de Bruijn, with the Netherlands women's national team in Beijing on 21 August 2008. She netted seven goals in the gold medal match, helping the Dutch team win the Olympics.

The most recent female player to do so was Roser Tarragó, with Spain women's national team in Rio de Janeiro on 19 August 2016.

Legend and abbreviation

- – Player's team drew the match
- – Player's team lost the match
- Team – Host team
- Player^{‡} – Player who won the tournament with her team
- G – Goals
- aet – After extra time
- pso – Penalty shootout

Female players with seven or more goals in an Olympic match
#	G	Player	Birth	Age	Height	L/R	For	Result	Against	Tournament	Round	Date	Ref
1	7	Daniëlle de Bruijn^{‡}	1978	30	1.72 m (5 ft 8 in)	Left	Netherlands	9–8	United States	Beijing 2008	Gold medal match	21 Aug 2008	
2	7	Maggie Steffens^{‡}	1993	19	1.73 m (5 ft 8 in)	Right	United States	14–13	Hungary	London 2012	Preliminary round Group A	30 Jul 2012	
3	7	Roser Tarragó	1993	23	1.71 m (5 ft 7 in)	Right	Spain	12–10	Australia	Rio 2016	5th–6th place match	19 Aug 2016	

The following table shows the historical progression of the record of goals scored by a female water polo player in a single Olympic match. Last updated: 1 April 2021.

Legend

- Team – Host team
- Player^{‡} – Player who won the tournament with his team

Historical progression of records: Most goals scored by a female player, one match
Goals	Achievement	Year	Player	Age	Height	L/R	Women's team	Date	Duration of record	Ref
5	Set record	2004	Kyriaki Liosi	24	1.70 m (5 ft 7 in)	Right	Greece	26 August 2004	3 years, 361 days	
5	Tied record	2008	Kate Gynther	26	1.75 m (5 ft 9 in)	Right	Australia	17 August 2008	3 years, 361 days	
7	Broke record	2008	Daniëlle de Bruijn^{‡}	30	1.72 m (5 ft 8 in)	Left	Netherlands	21 August 2008	17 years, 354 days	
7	Tied record	2012	Maggie Steffens^{‡}	19	1.73 m (5 ft 8 in)	Right	United States	30 July 2012	17 years, 354 days	
7	Tied record	2016	Roser Tarragó	23	1.71 m (5 ft 7 in)	Right	Spain	19 August 2016	17 years, 354 days	

=== Top goalscorers (one tournament) ===
The following table is pre-sorted by number of goals (in descending order), edition of the Olympics (in ascending order), number of matches played (in ascending order), name of the player (in ascending order), respectively. Last updated: 12 August 2021.

Seven female players have scored 18 or more goals in an Olympic water polo tournament.

At the 2020 Summer Olympics, Dutch left-hander Simone van de Kraats scored 28 goals, setting the record for the most goals scored by a female water polo player in a single Olympic tournament.

Maggie Steffens of the United States is the first and only female water polo player to achieve this feat twice. At the 2012 Summer Olympics, Steffens netted 21 goals. Nine years later, she scored 18 goals in Tokyo.

Legend

- Team – Host team
- Player^{‡} – Player who won the tournament with her team

Female players with 18 or more goals in an Olympic tournament
Rk	Year	Player	Birth	Age	Height	L/R	Goals	Matches played	Goals per match	Women's team	Finish	Ref
1	2020	Simone van de Kraats	2000	20	1.80 m (5 ft 11 in)	Left	28	7	4.000	Netherlands	6th of 10 teams	
2	2012	Maggie Steffens^{‡}	1993	19	1.73 m (5 ft 8 in)	Right	21	6	3.500	United States	1st of 8 teams	
3	2012	Ma Huanhuan	1990	22	1.78 m (5 ft 10 in)	Right	19	6	3.167	China	5th of 8 teams	
4	2012	Tania Di Mario	1979	33	1.68 m (5 ft 6 in)	Right	18	6	3.000	Italy	7th of 8 teams	
4	2020	Maddie Musselman^{‡}	1998	23	1.80 m (5 ft 11 in)	Right	18	7	2.571	United States	1st of 10 teams	
4	2020	Beatriz Ortiz	1995	26	1.76 m (5 ft 9 in)	Right	18	7	2.571	Spain	2nd of 10 teams	
4	2020	Maggie Steffens^{‡} (2)	1993	28	1.73 m (5 ft 8 in)	Right	18	7	2.571	United States	1st of 10 teams	
Rk	Year	Player	Birth	Age	Height	L/R	Goals	Matches played	Goals per match	Women's team	Finish	Ref

- Official Results Books (PDF): 2000 (pp. 96–101), 2004 (p. 53), 2008 (p. 54), 2012 (p. 345), 2016 (p. 193), 2020 (p. 234).

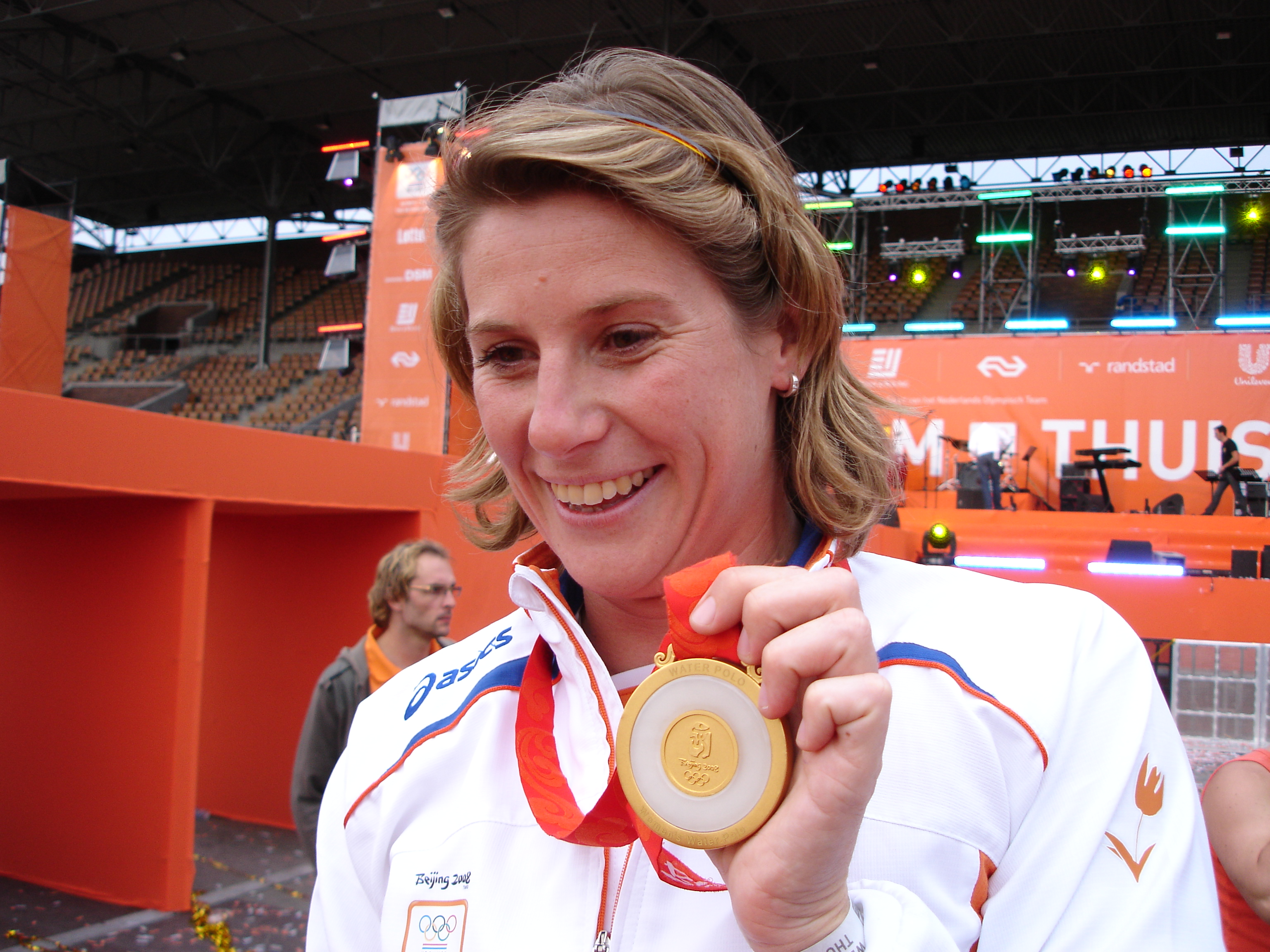
Daniëlle de Bruijn of the Netherlands scored 11 and 17 goals at the 2000 and 2008 Olympics, respectively.

The following table is pre-sorted by edition of the Olympics (in ascending order), number of matches played (in ascending order), name of the player (in ascending order), respectively. Last updated: 12 August 2021.

At 19 years old, Maggie Steffens of the United States made her Olympic debut at the 2012 London Olympics, where she was the youngest-ever female top goalscorer with 21 goals. She was also the top goalscorer at the 2016 Rio Olympics, with 17 goals.

Dutch left-handed player Daniëlle de Bruijn was the joint top goalscorer at the 2000 Olympics, with 11 goals. Eight years later she netted 17 goals, including seven goals in the gold medal match, becoming the top goalscorer at the 2008 Olympics.

Legend

- Team – Host team
- Player^{‡} – Player who won the tournament with her team

Female players with the most goals in each Olympic tournament
Year	Player	Birth	Age	Height	L/R	Goals	Matches played	Goals per match	Women's team	Finish	Ref
2000	Daniëlle de Bruijn	1978	22	1.72 m (5 ft 8 in)	Left	11	7	1.571	Netherlands	4th of 6 teams	
2000	Bridgette Gusterson^{‡}	1973	27	1.80 m (5 ft 11 in)	Right	11	7	1.571	Australia	1st of 6 teams	
2000	Sofia Konukh	1980	20	1.73 m (5 ft 8 in)	Right	11	7	1.571	Russia	3rd of 6 teams	
2004	Tania Di Mario^{‡}	1979	25	1.68 m (5 ft 6 in)	Right	14	6	2.333	Italy	1st of 8 teams	
2008	Daniëlle de Bruijn^{‡} (2)	1978	30	1.72 m (5 ft 8 in)	Left	17	6	2.833	Netherlands	1st of 8 teams	
2012	Maggie Steffens^{‡}	1993	19	1.73 m (5 ft 8 in)	Right	21	6	3.500	United States	1st of 8 teams	
2016	Maggie Steffens^{‡} (2)	1993	23	1.73 m (5 ft 8 in)	Right	17	6	2.833	United States	1st of 8 teams	
2020	Simone van de Kraats	2000	20	1.80 m (5 ft 11 in)	Left	28	7	4.000	Netherlands	6th of 10 teams	

- Official Results Books (PDF): 2000 (pp. 96–101), 2004 (p. 53), 2008 (p. 54), 2012 (p. 345), 2016 (p. 193), 2020 (p. 234).

The following table shows the historical progression of the record of goals scored by a female water polo player in a single Olympic tournament. Last updated: 12 August 2021.

Legend

- Team – Host team
- Player^{‡} – Player who won the tournament with her team

Historical progression of records: Most goals scored by a female player, one tournament
Goals	Achievement	Year	Player	Age	Height	L/R	Women's team	Date	Duration of record	Ref
11	Set record	2000	Daniëlle de Bruijn	22	1.72 m (5 ft 8 in)	Left	Netherlands	23 September 2000	3 years, 338 days	
11	Set record	2000	Bridgette Gusterson^{‡}	27	1.80 m (5 ft 11 in)	Right	Australia	23 September 2000	3 years, 338 days	
11	Set record	2000	Sofia Konukh	20	1.73 m (5 ft 8 in)	Right	Russia	23 September 2000	3 years, 338 days	
14	Broke record	2004	Tania Di Mario^{‡}	25	1.68 m (5 ft 6 in)	Right	Italy	26 August 2004	3 years, 361 days	
17	Broke record	2008	Daniëlle de Bruijn^{‡} (2)	30	1.72 m (5 ft 8 in)	Left	Netherlands	21 August 2008	3 years, 354 days	
21	Broke record	2012	Maggie Steffens^{‡}	19	1.73 m (5 ft 8 in)	Right	United States	9 August 2012	8 years, 363 days	
28	Broke record	2020	Simone van de Kraats	20	1.80 m (5 ft 11 in)	Left	Netherlands	7 August 2021	5 years, 3 days	

=== Top goalscorers (all-time) ===
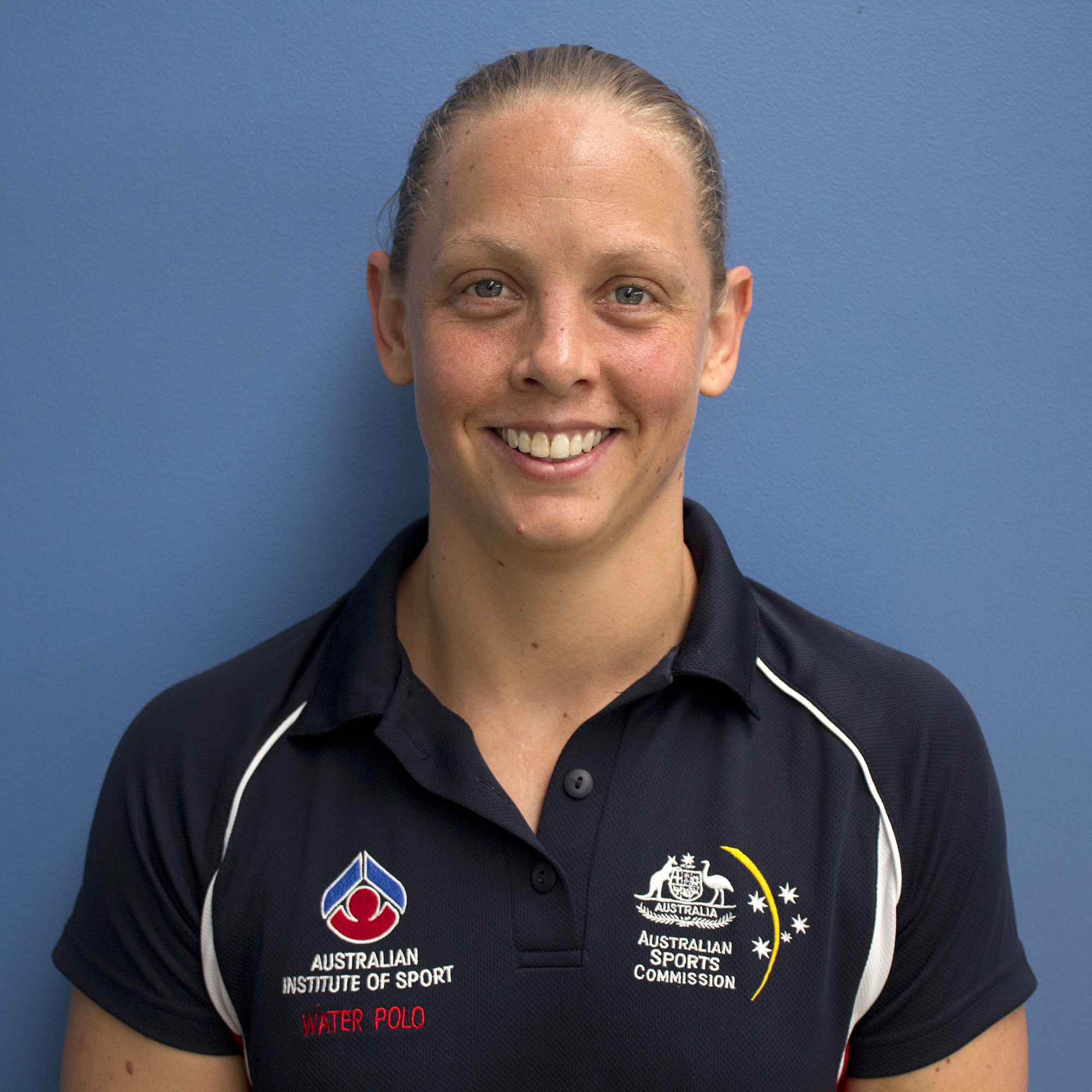
Kate Gynther of Australia scored 30 goals at three Olympics (2004–2012).

The following table is pre-sorted by number of total goals (in descending order), number of total Olympic matches played (in ascending order), date of the last Olympic match played (in ascending order), date of the first Olympic match played (in ascending order), name of the player (in ascending order), respectively. Last updated: 7 August 2021.

Three-time Olympian Maggie Steffens of the United States holds the record for the most goals scored by a female water polo player in Olympic history, with 56 goals.

Italian Tania Di Mario netted 47 goals at four Olympics (2004–2016).

Ma Huanhuan, representing China, holds the record for the most goals scored by an Asian female water polo player in Olympic history, with 37 goals at three Olympics (2008–2016).

Kate Gynther of Australia netted 30 goals in 32 matches between 2004 and 2012.

Legend

- – Hosts

All-time female players with 30 or more goals at the Olympics
Rk	Player	Birth	Height	L/R	Women's team	Total goals	Total matches played	Goals per match	Tournaments (goals)				Period (age of first/last)	Medals				Ref
Rk	Player	Birth	Height	L/R	Women's team	Total goals	Total matches played	Goals per match	1	2	3	4	Period (age of first/last)	G	S	B	T	Ref
1	Maggie Steffens	1993	1.73 m (5 ft 8 in)	Right	United States	56	19	2.947	2012 (21)	2016 (17)	2020 (18)		9 years (19/28)	3	0	0	3	
2	Tania Di Mario	1979	1.68 m (5 ft 6 in)	Right	Italy	47	23	2.043	2004 (14)	2008 (10)	2012 (18)	2016 (5)	12 years (25/37)	1	1	0	2	
3	Ma Huanhuan	1990	1.78 m (5 ft 10 in)	Right	China	37	17	2.176	2008 (7)	2012 (19)	2016 (11)		8 years (18/26)	0	0	0	0	
4	Sofia Konukh	1980	1.73 m (5 ft 8 in)	Right	Russia	31	22	1.409	2000 (11)	2004 (9)	2008 (7)	2012 (4)	12 years (20/32)	0	0	1	1	
5	Brenda Villa	1980	1.63 m (5 ft 4 in)	Right	United States	31	23	1.348	2000 (9)	2004 (7)	2008 (9)	2012 (6)	12 years (20/32)	1	2	1	4	
6	Kate Gynther	1982	1.75 m (5 ft 9 in)	Right	Australia	30	17	1.765	2004 (7)	2008 (13)	2012 (10)		8 years (22/30)	0	0	2	2	

- Official Results Books (PDF): 2000 (pp. 96–101), 2004 (p. 53), 2008 (p. 54), 2012 (p. 345), 2016 (p. 193).

The following table shows the historical progression of the record of total goals scored by a female water polo player at the Summer Olympics. Last updated: 7 August 2021.

Legend

- Team – Host team
- Player^{‡} – Player who won the tournament with her team

Historical progression of records: Most goals scored by a female player, all-time
Total goals	Achievement	Year	Player	Age	Height	L/R	Women's team	Date	Duration of record	Ref
20	Set record	2004	Sofia Konukh	24	1.73 m (5 ft 8 in)	Right	Russia	26 August 2004	3 years, 361 days	
28	Broke record	2008	Daniëlle de Bruijn	30	1.72 m (5 ft 8 in)	Left	Netherlands	21 August 2008	3 years, 354 days	
42	Broke record	2012	Tania Di Mario	33	1.68 m (5 ft 6 in)	Right	Italy	9 August 2012	4 years, 10 days	
47	Broke record	2016	Tania Di Mario (2)	37	1.68 m (5 ft 6 in)	Right	Italy	19 August 2016	4 years, 353 days	
56	Broke record	2020	Maggie Steffens	28	1.73 m (5 ft 8 in)	Right	United States	7 August 2021	5 years, 3 days	

=== Top goalkeepers (one match) ===
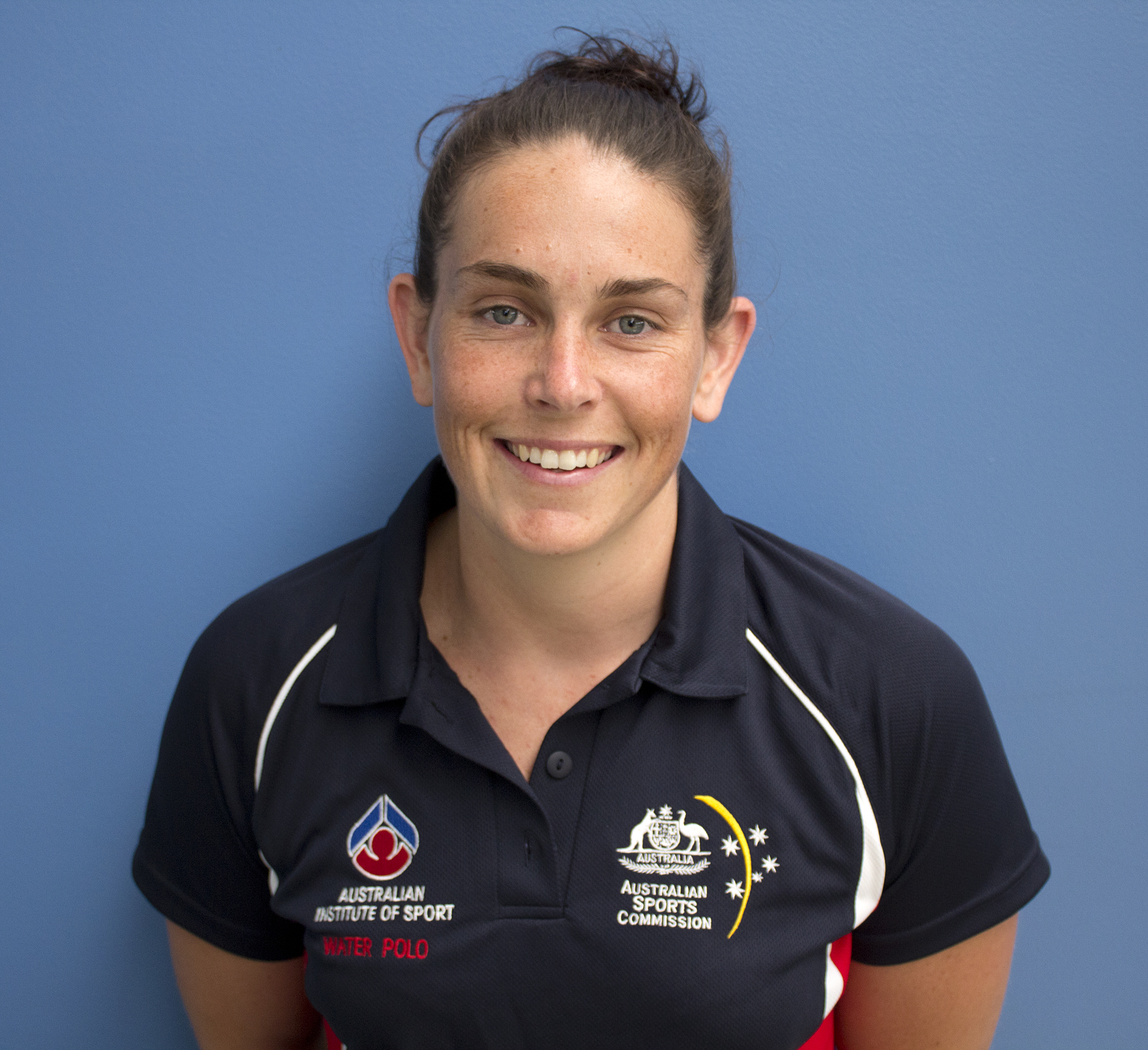
Alicia McCormack of Australia saved 15 shots in a match in 2008.

The following table is pre-sorted by date of the match (in ascending order), name of the goalkeeper (in ascending order), respectively. Last updated: 1 April 2021.

Five female water polo goalkeepers have each saved fifteen or more shots in an Olympic match.

The first woman to do so was Patrícia Horváth, with Hungary women's national team in Beijing. She blocked 19 shots on 11 August 2008, setting the record for the most shots saved by a female water polo goalkeeper in a single Olympic match.

The most recent female goalkeeper to do so was Yang Jun, with China women's national team in Rio de Janeiro on 19 August 2016.

Legend and abbreviation

- – Player's team drew the match
- – Player's team lost the match
- Team – Host team
- Player^{‡} – Player who won the tournament with her team
- aet – After extra time
- pso – Penalty shootout
- ORB – Official Results Books

Female goalkeepers with fifteen or more saves in an Olympic match
#	Saves	Goalkeeper	Birth	Age	Height	For	Result	Against	Tournament	Round	Date	Ref
1	19	Patrícia Horváth	1977	30	1.83 m (6 ft 0 in)	Hungary	11–9	Netherlands	Beijing 2008	Preliminary round Group B	11 Aug 2008	ORB 2008 (p. 17)
2	15	Alicia McCormack	1983	25	1.67 m (5 ft 6 in)	Australia	8–9	United States	Beijing 2008	Semi-finals	19 Aug 2008	ORB 2008 (p. 35)
3	16	Elena Gigli	1985	27	1.92 m (6 ft 4 in)	Italy	4–7	Russia	London 2012	Preliminary round Group B	1 Aug 2012	ORB 2012 (p. 302)
4	15	Tess Oliveira	1987	29	1.65 m (5 ft 5 in)	Brazil	4–11	Australia	Rio 2016	Classification round 5th–8th place	17 Aug 2016	ORB 2016 (p. 170)
5	16	Yang Jun	1988	28	1.80 m (5 ft 11 in)	China	10–5	Brazil	Rio 2016	7th–8th place match	19 Aug 2016	ORB 2016 (p. 178)

The following table shows the historical progression of the record of shots saved by a female water polo goalkeeper in a single Olympic match. Last updated: 1 April 2021.

Legend

- Team – Host team
- Player^{‡} – Player who won the tournament with her team
- ORB – Official Results Books

Historical progression of records: Most shots saved by a female goalkeeper, one match
Saves	Achievement	Year	Goalkeeper	Age	Height	Women's team	Date	Duration of record	Ref
12	Set record	2000	Bernice Orwig	23	1.82 m (6 ft 0 in)	United States	18 September 2000	3 years, 337 days	ORB 2000 (p. 114)
14	Broke record	2004	Jacqueline Frank	24	1.80 m (5 ft 11 in)	United States	20 August 2004	3 years, 357 days	ORB 2004 (p. 24)
19	Broke record	2008	Patrícia Horváth	30	1.83 m (6 ft 0 in)	Hungary	11 August 2008	17 years, 364 days	ORB 2008 (p. 17)

=== Top goalkeepers (one tournament) ===
The following table is pre-sorted by number of saves (in descending order), edition of the Olympics (in ascending order), number of matches played (in ascending order), name of the goalkeeper (in ascending order), respectively. Last updated: 1 April 2021.

Six female goalkeepers have saved 50 or more shots in an Olympic water polo tournament.

Giulia Gorlero of Italy holds the record for the most saves by a female water polo goalkeeper in a single Olympic tournament, blocking 65 shots in the 2016 edition.

At the 2016 Summer Games, Ashleigh Johnson saved 51 shots, including nine in the gold medal match, helping the American team win the Olympics. She is the most efficient one among these six goalkeepers.

Legend and abbreviation

- Team – Host team
- Player^{‡} – Player who won the tournament with her team
- MP – Matches played
- Eff % – Save efficiency (Saves / Shots)
- 64.6% – Highest save efficiency

Female goalkeepers with 50 or more saves in an Olympic tournament
Rk	Year	Goalkeeper	Birth	Age	Height	Saves	Shots	Eff %	MP	Saves per match	Women's team	Finish	Ref
1	2016	Giulia Gorlero	1990	25	1.80 m (5 ft 11 in)	65	106	61.3%	6	10.833	Italy	2nd of 8 teams	
2	2012	Elena Gigli	1985	27	1.92 m (6 ft 4 in)	56	105	53.3%	6	9.333	Italy	7th of 8 teams	
3	2016	Yang Jun	1988	28	1.80 m (5 ft 11 in)	55	118	46.6%	6	9.167	China	7th of 8 teams	
4	2012	Rosemary Morris	1986	26	1.80 m (5 ft 11 in)	54	113	47.8%	6	9.000	Great Britain	8th of 8 teams	
5	2012	Elizabeth Armstrong^{‡}	1983	29	1.92 m (6 ft 4 in)	53	101	52.5%	6	8.833	United States	1st of 8 teams	
6	2016	Ashleigh Johnson^{‡}	1994	21	1.86 m (6 ft 1 in)	51	79	64.6%	6	8.500	United States	1st of 8 teams	

- Official Results Books (PDF): 2000 (pp. 96–101), 2004 (p. 49), 2008 (p. 50), 2012 (p. 341), 2016 (p. 195).

The following table is pre-sorted by edition of the Olympics (in ascending order), number of matches played (in ascending order), name of the goalkeeper (in ascending order), respectively. Last updated: 1 April 2021.

At the 2004 Summer Games, Jacqueline Frank saved 41 shots, including seven in the bronze medal match, helping the United States win the match.

Giulia Gorlero of Italy blocked 65 shots at the 2016 Olympics, helping the Italian team win the Olympic silver medal.

Legend and abbreviation

- Team – Host team
- Player^{‡} – Player who won the tournament with her team
- MP – Matches played
- Eff % – Save efficiency (Saves / Shots)

Female goalkeepers with the most saves in each Olympic tournament
Year	Goalkeeper	Birth	Age	Height	Saves	Shots	Eff %	MP	Saves per match	Women's team	Finish	Ref
2000	Karla Plugge	1968	31	1.81 m (5 ft 11 in)	45	81	55.6%	7	6.429	Netherlands	4th of 6 teams	
2004	Jacqueline Frank	1980	24	1.80 m (5 ft 11 in)	41	68	60.3%	5	8.200	United States	3rd of 8 teams	
2008	Elizabeth Armstrong	1983	25	1.88 m (6 ft 2 in)	49	92	53.3%	5	9.800	United States	2nd of 8 teams	
2012	Elena Gigli	1985	27	1.92 m (6 ft 4 in)	56	105	53.3%	6	9.333	Italy	7th of 8 teams	
2016	Giulia Gorlero	1990	25	1.80 m (5 ft 11 in)	65	106	61.3%	6	10.833	Italy	2nd of 8 teams	

- Official Results Books (PDF): 2000 (pp. 96–101), 2004 (p. 49), 2008 (p. 50), 2012 (p. 341), 2016 (p. 195).

The following table shows the historical progression of the record of shots saved by a female water polo goalkeeper in a single Olympic tournament. Last updated: 1 April 2021.

Legend

- Team – Host team
- Player^{‡} – Player who won the tournament with her team

Historical progression of records: Most shots saved by a female goalkeeper, one tournament
Saves	Achievement	Year	Goalkeeper	Age	Height	Women's team	Date	Duration of record	Ref
45	Set record	2000	Karla Plugge	31	1.81 m (5 ft 11 in)	Netherlands	23 September 2000	7 years, 333 days	
49	Broke record	2008	Elizabeth Armstrong	25	1.88 m (6 ft 2 in)	United States	21 August 2008	3 years, 354 days	
56	Broke record	2012	Elena Gigli	27	1.92 m (6 ft 4 in)	Italy	9 August 2012	4 years, 10 days	
65	Broke record	2016	Giulia Gorlero	25	1.80 m (5 ft 11 in)	Italy	19 August 2016	9 years, 356 days	

=== Top goalkeepers (all-time) ===
The following table is pre-sorted by number of total saves (in descending order), number of total Olympic matches played (in ascending order), date of the last Olympic match played (in ascending order), date of the first Olympic match played (in ascending order), name of the goalkeeper (in ascending order), respectively. Last updated: 1 April 2021.

Yang Jun of China holds the record for the most shots saved by a female water polo goalkeeper at the Olympics, with 138 saves at three Olympics (2008–2016).

Elizabeth Armstrong, representing the United States, blocked 102 shots at two Olympics (2008–2012).

Legend

- – Hosts

All-time female goalkeepers with 100 or more saves at the Olympics
Rk	Goalkeeper	Birth	Height	Women's team	Total saves	Total matches played	Saves per match	Tournaments (saves)			Period (age of first/last)	Medals				Ref
Rk	Goalkeeper	Birth	Height	Women's team	Total saves	Total matches played	Saves per match	1	2	3	Period (age of first/last)	G	S	B	T	Ref
1	Yang Jun	1988	1.80 m (5 ft 11 in)	China	138	17	8.118	2008 (39)	2012 (44)	2016 (55)	8 years (20/28)	0	0	0	0	
2	Elizabeth Armstrong	1983	1.88 m (6 ft 2 in)	United States	102	11	9.273	2008 (49)	2012 (53)		4 years (25/29)	1	1	0	2	

- Official Results Books (PDF): 2000 (pp. 96–101), 2004 (p. 49), 2008 (p. 50), 2012 (p. 341), 2016 (p. 195).

The following table shows the historical progression of the record of total shots saved by a female water polo goalkeeper at the Summer Olympics. Last updated: 1 April 2021.

Legend

- Team – Host team
- Player^{‡} – Player who won the tournament with her team

Historical progression of records: Most shots saved by a female goalkeeper, all-time
Total saves	Achievement	Year	Goalkeeper	Age	Height	Women's team	Date	Duration of record	Ref
53	Set record	2008	Georgia Ellinaki	34	1.74 m (5 ft 9 in)	Greece	21 August 2008	3 years, 354 days	
102	Broke record	2012	Elizabeth Armstrong^{‡}	29	1.88 m (6 ft 2 in)	United States	9 August 2012	4 years, 10 days	
138	Broke record	2016	Yang Jun	28	1.80 m (5 ft 11 in)	China	19 August 2016	9 years, 356 days	

=== Top sprinters (one tournament) ===
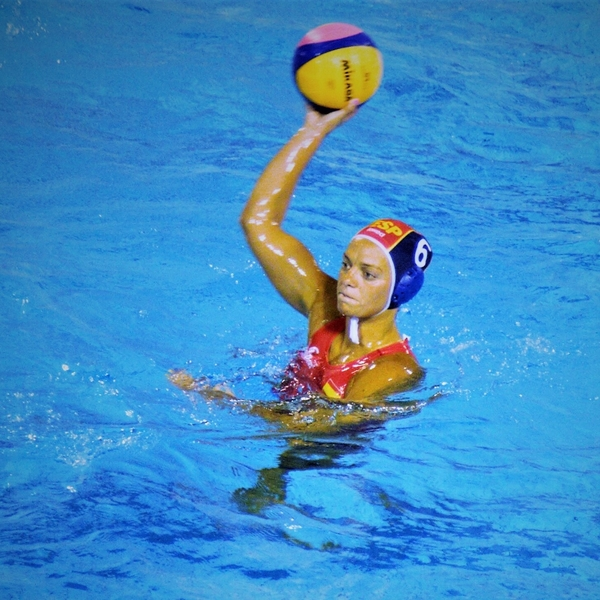
Jennifer Pareja of Spain was the joint top sprinter in 2012.

The following table is pre-sorted by number of sprints won (in descending order), edition of the Olympics (in ascending order), number of sprints contested (in ascending order), name of the player (in ascending order), respectively. Last updated: 13 August 2021.

Four female players have won 20 or more sprints in an Olympic water polo tournament.

At the 2020 Tokyo Olympics, Vanda Vályi won 27 sprints, helping Hungary win bronze. As of the end of the 2024 Olympics, she held the record for the most sprints won among all Olympic women's water polo competitors.

Legend and abbreviation

- Team – Host team
- Player^{‡} – Player who won the tournament with his team
- Eff % – Efficiency (Sprints won / Sprints contested)
- 96.4% – Highest efficiency

Female players with 20 or more sprints won in an Olympic tournament
Rk	Year	Sprinter	Birth	Age	Height	Sprints won	Sprints contested	Eff %	Women's team	Finish	Note	Ref
1	2020	Vanda Vályi	1999	21	1.81 m (5 ft 11 in)	27	28	96.4%	Hungary	3rd of 10 teams		
2	2004	Kyriaki Liosi	1979	24	1.70 m (5 ft 7 in)	21	23	91.3%	Greece	2nd of 8 teams		
3	2012	Kate Gynther	1982	30	1.75 m (5 ft 9 in)	21	24	87.5%	Australia	3rd of 8 teams		
3	2012	Jennifer Pareja	1984	28	1.74 m (5 ft 9 in)	21	24	87.5%	Spain	2nd of 8 teams		

- Official Results Books (PDF): 2000 (p. 102), 2004 (p. 52), 2008 (p. 53), 2012 (p. 344), 2016 (p. 192).

The following table is pre-sorted by edition of the Olympics (in ascending order), number of sprints contested (in ascending order), name of the player (in ascending order), respectively. Last updated: 13 August 2021.

Kate Gynther, captain of the Australia women's national team, and Jennifer Pareja, captain of the Spain women's national team, were the joint top sprinters at the 2012 London Olympics.

At the 2020 Summer Olympics, Hungarian Vanda Vályi won 27 sprints, setting the record for the most sprints won by a female water polo player in a single Olympic tournament.

Legend and abbreviation

- Team – Host team
- Player^{‡} – Player who won the tournament with his team
- Eff % – Efficiency (Sprints won / Sprints contested)

Female players with the most sprints won in each Olympic tournament
Year	Sprinter	Birth	Age	Height	Sprints won	Sprints contested	Eff %	Women's team	Finish	Note	Ref
2000	Tatiana Petrova	1973	27	1.62 m (5 ft 4 in)	16	22	72.7%	Russia	3rd of 8 teams		
2004	Kyriaki Liosi	1979	24	1.70 m (5 ft 7 in)	21	23	91.3%	Greece	2nd of 8 teams		
2008	Wang Yi	1987	21	1.79 m (5 ft 10 in)	18	19	94.7%	China	5th of 8 teams		
2012	Kate Gynther	1982	30	1.75 m (5 ft 9 in)	21	24	87.5%	Australia	3rd of 8 teams		
2012	Jennifer Pareja	1984	28	1.74 m (5 ft 9 in)	21	24	87.5%	Spain	2nd of 8 teams		
2016	Rachel Fattal^{‡}	1993	22	1.73 m (5 ft 8 in)	17	23	73.9%	United States	1st of 8 teams		
2020	Vanda Vályi	1999	21	1.81 m (5 ft 11 in)	27	28	96.4%	Hungary	3rd of 10 teams		

- Official Results Books (PDF): 2000 (p. 102), 2004 (p. 52), 2008 (p. 53), 2012 (p. 344), 2016 (p. 192).

The following table shows the historical progression of the record of sprints won by a female water polo player in a single Olympic tournament. Last updated: 13 August 2021.

Legend

- Team – Host team
- Player^{‡} – Player who won the tournament with his team

Historical progression of records: Most sprints won by a female player, one tournament
Sprints won	Achievement	Year	Sprinter	Age	Height	Women's team	Date	Duration of record	Ref
16	Set record	2000	Tatiana Petrova	27	1.62 m (5 ft 4 in)	Russia	23 September 2000	3 years, 338 days	
21	Broke record	2004	Kyriaki Liosi	24	1.70 m (5 ft 7 in)	Greece	26 August 2004	21 years, 349 days	
21	Tied record	2012	Kate Gynther	30	1.75 m (5 ft 9 in)	Australia	9 August 2012	21 years, 349 days	
21	Tied record	2012	Jennifer Pareja	28	1.74 m (5 ft 9 in)	Spain	9 August 2012	21 years, 349 days	
27	Broke record	2020	Vanda Vályi	21	1.81 m (5 ft 11 in)	Hungary	7 August 2021	5 years, 3 days	

=== Top sprinters (all-time) ===
The following table is pre-sorted by number of total sprints won (in descending order), number of total sprints contested (in ascending order), year of the last Olympic appearance (in ascending order), year of the first Olympic appearance (in ascending order), name of the player (in ascending order), respectively. Last updated: 15 May 2021.

Australian Kate Gynther holds the record for the most sprints won by a female water polo player at the Olympics, with 39 sprints won at three Olympics (2004–2012).

Wang Yi of China won 35 sprints in two Olympic tournaments between 2008 and 2012.

Legend and abbreviation

- – Hosts
- Eff % – Efficiency (Sprints won / Sprints contested)

All-time female players with 30 or more sprints won at the Olympics
Rk	Sprinter	Birth	Height	Women's team	Total Sprints won	Total Sprints contested	Eff %	Water polo tournaments (sprints won / contested)					Period (age of first/last)	Medals				Ref
Rk	Sprinter	Birth	Height	Women's team	Total Sprints won	Total Sprints contested	Eff %	1	2	3	4	5	Period (age of first/last)	G	S	B	T	Ref
1	Kate Gynther	1982	1.75 m (5 ft 9 in)	Australia	39	58	67.2%	2004 (5/8)	2008 (13/26)	2012 (21/24)			8 years (22/30)	0	0	2	2	
2	Wang Yi	1987	1.79 m (5 ft 10 in)	China	35	47	74.5%	2008 (18/19)	2012 (17/28)				4 years (21/25)	0	0	0	0	

- Official Results Books (PDF): 2000 (p. 102), 2004 (p. 52), 2008 (p. 53), 2012 (p. 344), 2016 (p. 192).

The following table shows the historical progression of the record of total sprints won by a female water polo player at the Summer Olympics. Last updated: 15 May 2021.

Legend

- Team – Host team
- Player^{‡} – Player who won the tournament with his team

Historical progression of records: Most sprints won by a female player, all-time
Total Sprints won	Achievement	Year	Sprinter	Age	Height	Women's team	Date	Duration of record	Ref
21	Set record	2004	Kyriaki Liosi	24	1.70 m (5 ft 7 in)	Greece	26 August 2004	3 years, 357 days	
28	Broke record	2008	Kyriaki Liosi	28	1.70 m (5 ft 7 in)	Greece	17 August 2008	3 years, 358 days	
39	Broke record	2012	Kate Gynther	30	1.75 m (5 ft 9 in)	Australia	9 August 2012	14 years, 1 day	

=== All-star teams by tournament ===
This is a summary of women's Olympic all-star teams by tournament. Last updated: 1 April 2021.

Legend and abbreviation

- Player^{‡} – Player who won the tournament with her team
- LH – Left-handed
- Eff % – Save efficiency (Saves / Shots)

Women's Olympic all-star teams by tournament (since 2004)
Year	Most Valuable Player	All-star team			Ref
2004	Italy; Tania Di Mario^{‡} Right side player 1.68 m (5 ft 6 in)	Goalkeeper	(Greece) Georgia Ellinaki (40 saves, 54.8%)		
2004	Italy; Tania Di Mario^{‡} Right side player 1.68 m (5 ft 6 in)	Field players	(Italy) Tania Di Mario^{‡} (14 goals, 7 sprints won)	(Hungary) Rita Drávucz (7 goals, 6 sprints won)	
2004	Italy; Tania Di Mario^{‡} Right side player 1.68 m (5 ft 6 in)	Field players	(Greece) Kyriaki Liosi (9 goals, 21 sprints won)	(Italy) Martina Miceli^{‡} (9 goals)	
2004	Italy; Tania Di Mario^{‡} Right side player 1.68 m (5 ft 6 in)	Field players	(Greece) Evangelia Moraitidou (7 goals)	(United States) Brenda Villa (7 goals)	
2008	—N/a	Goalkeeper	(Hungary) Patrícia Horváth (43 saves, 55.8%)		
2008	—N/a	Field players	(Netherlands) Daniëlle de Bruijn^{‡} (LH, 17 goals, 15 sprints won)	(Italy) Elisa Casanova (LH, 7 goals)	
2008	—N/a	Field players	(China) Gao Ao (11 goals)	(Australia) Bronwen Knox (12 goals)	
2008	—N/a	Field players	(United States) Jessica Steffens (5 goals)	(Hungary) Ágnes Valkai (7 goals, 10 sprints won)	
2012	United States; Maggie Steffens^{‡} Left side player 1.73 m (5 ft 8 in)	Goalkeeper	(United States) Elizabeth Armstrong^{‡} (53 saves, 52.5%)		
2012	United States; Maggie Steffens^{‡} Left side player 1.73 m (5 ft 8 in)	Field players	(Hungary) Barbara Bujka (LH, 12 goals)	(Spain) Anni Espar (15 goals)	
2012	United States; Maggie Steffens^{‡} Left side player 1.73 m (5 ft 8 in)	Field players	(Australia) Holly Lincoln-Smith (5 goals)	(Spain) Jennifer Pareja (12 goals, 21 sprints won)	
2012	United States; Maggie Steffens^{‡} Left side player 1.73 m (5 ft 8 in)	Field players	(United States) Maggie Steffens^{‡} (21 goals)	(Australia) Nicola Zagame (12 goals, 4 sprints won)	
2016	United States; Maggie Steffens^{‡} (2); Left side player 1.73 m (5 ft 8 in)	Goalkeeper	(United States) Ashleigh Johnson^{‡} (51 saves, 64.6%)		
2016	United States; Maggie Steffens^{‡} (2); Left side player 1.73 m (5 ft 8 in)	Field players	(Hungary) Barbara Bujka (LH, 15 goals)	(Italy) Arianna Garibotti (12 goals)	
2016	United States; Maggie Steffens^{‡} (2); Left side player 1.73 m (5 ft 8 in)	Field players	(Hungary) Rita Keszthelyi (14 goals, 10 sprints won)	(United States) Maddie Musselman^{‡} (12 goals)	
2016	United States; Maggie Steffens^{‡} (2); Left side player 1.73 m (5 ft 8 in)	Field players	(Australia) Ashleigh Southern (14 goals)	(United States) Maggie Steffens^{‡} (17 goals, 1 sprints won)	
Year	Most Valuable Player	All-star team			Ref

== Coach statistics ==
=== Most successful coaches ===
The following table is pre-sorted by total number of Olympic medals (in descending order), number of Olympic gold medals (in descending order), number of Olympic silver medals (in descending order), year of winning the last Olympic medal (in ascending order), year of winning the first Olympic medal (in ascending order), name of the coach (in ascending order), respectively. Last updated: 31 March 2021.

There are three coaches who led women's national water polo teams to win two or more Olympic medals.

Guy Baker guided the United States women's national team to three Olympic medals in a row between 2000 and 2008.

Adam Krikorian coached the United States women's national team to three consecutive Olympic gold medals in 2012, 2016 and 2024.

Miki Oca guided Spain women's national team to three Olympic medals between 2012 and 2024, including one gold.

Greg McFadden led Australia women's national team to win two consecutive Olympic bronze medals in 2008 and 2012.

Legend

- – Hosts

Head coaches who led women's national teams to win two or more Olympic medals
Rk	Head coach	Nationality	Birth	Age	Women's team	Tournaments (finish)				Period	Medals				Ref
Rk	Head coach	Nationality	Birth	Age	Women's team	1	2	3	4	Period	G	S	B	T	Ref
1	Adam Krikorian	United States	1974	38–42	United States	2012 (1st)	2016 (1st)	2020 (1st) |	12 years	3	0	0	3		
2	Miki Oca	Spain	1970	42–54	Spain	2012 (2nd)		2020 (2nd)	2024 (1st)		12 years	1	2	0	3
3	Guy Baker	United States	1961	65	United States	2000 (2nd)	2004 (3rd)	2008 (2nd)		8 years	0	2	1	3	
4	Greg McFadden	Australia	1964	43–51	Australia	2008 (3rd)	2012 (3rd)	2016 (6th)		8 years		0	0	2	2

=== Medals as coach and player ===
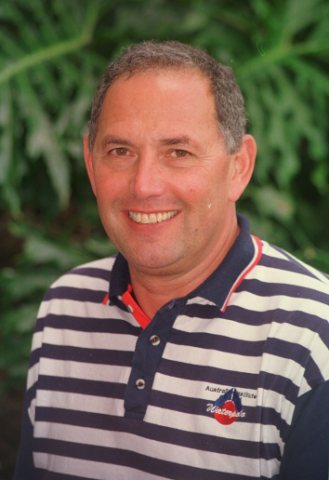
István Görgényi of Hungary won an Olympic medal in 1972, and then coached the Australia women's team to gold in 2000.

The following table is pre-sorted by total number of Olympic medals (in descending order), number of Olympic gold medals (in descending order), number of Olympic silver medals (in descending order), year of winning the last Olympic medal (in ascending order), year of winning the first Olympic medal (in ascending order), name of the person (in ascending order), respectively. Last updated: 31 March 2021.

As of 2016, two water polo players won Olympic medals and then guided women's national water polo teams to the Olympic podium as head coaches.

With the Hungary men's national water polo team, István Görgényi won a silver medal at the 1972 Summer Olympics in Munich. He was appointed head coach of the Australia women's national team in 1998. At the 2000 Sydney Olympics, he led the team to win the inaugural women's water polo gold medal.

Spanish water polo player Miki Oca won a silver medal at the 1992 Summer Olympics in Barcelona. Four years later, he won a gold medal at the 1996 Olympics in Atlanta. As a head coach, he guided Spain women's national water polo team to a gold medal at the 2024 Paris Olympics, and silver medals at London 2012 and Tokyo 2020.

Legend

- Year^{*} – As host team

Rk	Person	Birth	Height	Player				Head coach			Total medals				Ref
Rk	Person	Birth	Height	Age	Men's team	Pos	Medal	Age	Women's team	Medal	G	S	B	T	Ref
1	Miki Oca	1970	1.87 m (6 ft 2 in)	22–26	Spain	FP	1992^{*} (silver) , 1996 (gold)	42	Spain	2024 (gold); 2012, 2020 (silver)	2	3	0	5	
2	István Görgényi	1946	1.87 m (6 ft 2 in)	25	Hungary	FP	1972 (silver)	53	Australia	2000^{*} (gold)	1	1	0	2	

== See also ==
- Water polo at the Summer Olympics
- Lists of Olympic water polo records and statistics
  - List of men's Olympic water polo tournament records and statistics
  - List of Olympic champions in men's water polo
  - List of Olympic champions in women's water polo
  - National team appearances in the men's Olympic water polo tournament
  - National team appearances in the women's Olympic water polo tournament
  - List of players who have appeared in multiple men's Olympic water polo tournaments
  - List of players who have appeared in multiple women's Olympic water polo tournaments
  - List of Olympic medalists in water polo (men)
  - List of Olympic medalists in water polo (women)
  - List of men's Olympic water polo tournament top goalscorers
  - List of women's Olympic water polo tournament top goalscorers
  - List of men's Olympic water polo tournament goalkeepers
  - List of women's Olympic water polo tournament goalkeepers
  - List of Olympic venues in water polo
- FINA Water Polo World Rankings
- List of water polo world medalists
- Major achievements in water polo by nation

== Sources ==
=== Official Results Books (IOC) ===
PDF documents in the LA84 Foundation Digital Library:

- Official Results Book – 2000 Olympic Games – Water Polo (download, archive)
- Official Results Book – 2004 Olympic Games – Water Polo (download, archive)
- Official Results Book – 2008 Olympic Games – Water Polo (download, archive)

PDF documents on the FINA website:

- Official Results Book – 2012 Olympic Games – Diving, Swimming, Synchronised Swimming, Water Polo (archive) (pp. 284–507)

PDF documents in the Olympic World Library:

- Official Results Book – 2016 Olympic Games – Water Polo (archive)

PDF documents on the International Olympic Committee website:

- Official Results Book – 2020 Olympic Games – Water Polo (archive)
- Official Results Book – 2024 Olympic Games – Water Polo

=== Official Reports (FINA) ===
PDF documents on the FINA website:

- HistoFINA – Water polo medalists and statistics (as of September 2019) (archive) (p. 56)
- 1870–2020 | 150 years of Water Polo – Evolution of its rules (archive)

=== Official website (IOC) ===
Water polo on the International Olympic Committee website:

- Water polo
- Women's water polo

=== Olympedia ===
Water polo on the Olympedia website:

- Water polo
- Women's water polo
- Athlete count for water polo
- Water polo venues
- Water polo at the 2000 Summer Olympics (women's tournament)
- Water polo at the 2004 Summer Olympics (women's tournament)
- Water polo at the 2008 Summer Olympics (women's tournament)
- Water polo at the 2012 Summer Olympics (women's tournament)
- Water polo at the 2016 Summer Olympics (women's tournament)
- Water polo at the 2020 Summer Olympics (women's tournament)

=== Sports Reference ===
Water polo on the Sports Reference website:

- Country Medal Leaders & Athlete Medal Leaders (1900–2016) (archived)
- Women's water polo (2000–2016) (archived)
- Water polo at the 2000 Summer Games (women's tournament) (archived)
- Water polo at the 2004 Summer Games (women's tournament) (archived)
- Water polo at the 2008 Summer Games (women's tournament) (archived)
- Water polo at the 2012 Summer Games (women's tournament) (archived)
- Water polo at the 2016 Summer Games (women's tournament) (archived)

=== Todor66 ===
Water polo on the Todor66 website:

- Water polo at the Summer Games
- Water polo at the 2000 Summer Olympics (women's tournament, women's qualification)
- Water polo at the 2004 Summer Olympics (women's tournament, women's qualification)
- Water polo at the 2008 Summer Olympics (women's tournament, women's qualification)
- Water polo at the 2012 Summer Olympics (women's tournament, women's qualification)
- Water polo at the 2016 Summer Olympics (women's tournament, women's qualification)
- Water polo at the 2020 Summer Olympics (women's tournament, women's qualification)
