= Yang Jun (water polo) =

Chinese water polo player (born 1988)

Personal information
- Born: 28 April 1988 (age 38) Beijing, China
- Height: 180 cm (5 ft 11 in)
- Weight: 69 kg (152 lb)

Sport
- Country: China
- Sport: Water polo
Medal record
Women's water polo
Representing China
World Championships
Silver medal – second place	2011 Shanghai	Team
World Cup
Bronze medal – third place	2010 Christchurch	Team
Universiade
Gold medal – first place	2009 Belgrade	Team
Gold medal – first place	2011 Shenzhen	Team
Asian Games
Gold medal – first place	2010 Guangzhou	Team
Gold medal – first place	2014 Incheon	Team
Asian Aquatics Championships
Gold medal – first place	2012 Dubai	Team
Gold medal – first place	2016 Tokyo	Team
Gold medal – first place	2025 Ahmedabad	Team

Yang Jun (杨珺; born 28 April 1988 in Beijing) is a female Chinese water polo goalkeeper who was part of the silver medal-winning team at the 2011 World Championships, held in Shanghai, and 2007 World Junior Championship. She competed at the 2008, 2012 and 2016 Summer Olympics. She is a leading goalkeeper in Olympic water polo history, with 138 saves.

== See also ==
- China women's Olympic water polo team records and statistics
- List of players who have appeared in multiple women's Olympic water polo tournaments
- List of women's Olympic water polo tournament goalkeepers
- List of World Aquatics Championships medalists in water polo
