= Lists of Olympic water polo records and statistics =

The following articles list Olympic water polo records and statistics:

== Topics ==
- List of men's Olympic water polo tournament records and statistics
- List of women's Olympic water polo tournament records and statistics
- List of Olympic champions in men's water polo
- List of Olympic champions in women's water polo
- National team appearances in the men's Olympic water polo tournament
- National team appearances in the women's Olympic water polo tournament
- List of players who appeared in multiple men's Olympic water polo tournaments
- List of players who appeared in multiple women's Olympic water polo tournaments
- List of Olympic medalists in water polo (men)
- List of Olympic medalists in water polo (women)
- List of men's Olympic water polo tournament top goalscorers
- List of women's Olympic water polo tournament top goalscorers
- List of men's Olympic water polo tournament goalkeepers
- List of women's Olympic water polo tournament goalkeepers
- Water polo people at the opening and closing ceremonies
- List of Olympic venues in water polo

== Teams ==
=== Men's teams ===
==== Europe ====
- Belgium men's Olympic water polo team records and statistics
- Croatia men's Olympic water polo team records and statistics
- France men's Olympic water polo team records and statistics
- Germany men's Olympic water polo team records and statistics
- Great Britain men's Olympic water polo team records and statistics
- Greece men's Olympic water polo team records and statistics
- Hungary men's Olympic water polo team records and statistics
- Italy men's Olympic water polo team records and statistics
- Montenegro men's Olympic water polo team records and statistics
- Netherlands men's Olympic water polo team records and statistics
- Romania men's Olympic water polo team records and statistics
- Russia men's Olympic water polo team records and statistics
- Serbia men's Olympic water polo team records and statistics
- Serbia and Montenegro men's Olympic water polo team records and statistics
- Soviet Union men's Olympic water polo team records and statistics
- Spain men's Olympic water polo team records and statistics
- Sweden men's Olympic water polo team records and statistics
- Yugoslavia men's Olympic water polo team records and statistics

==== Other continents ====
- Australia men's Olympic water polo team records and statistics
- Brazil men's Olympic water polo team records and statistics
- Canada men's Olympic water polo team records and statistics
- Egypt men's Olympic water polo team records and statistics
- Japan men's Olympic water polo team records and statistics
- Kazakhstan men's Olympic water polo team records and statistics
- United States men's Olympic water polo team records and statistics
  - United States men's Olympic water polo team results

=== Women's teams ===
- Australia women's Olympic water polo team records and statistics
- Canada women's Olympic water polo team records and statistics
- China women's Olympic water polo team records and statistics
- Greece women's Olympic water polo team records and statistics
- Hungary women's Olympic water polo team records and statistics
- Italy women's Olympic water polo team records and statistics
- Netherlands women's Olympic water polo team records and statistics
- Russia women's Olympic water polo team records and statistics
- Spain women's Olympic water polo team records and statistics
- United States women's Olympic water polo team records and statistics
