= China women's Olympic water polo team records and statistics =

This article lists various water polo records and statistics in relation to the China women's national water polo team at the Summer Olympics.

The China women's national water polo team has participated in 3 of 5 official women's water polo tournaments.

== Abbreviations ==
| Apps | Appearances | Rk | Rank | Ref | Reference | Cap No. | Water polo cap number |
| Pos | Playing position | FP | Field player | GK | Goalkeeper | ISHOF | International Swimming Hall of Fame |
| L/R | Handedness | L | Left-handed | R | Right-handed | Oly debut | Olympic debut in water polo |
| (C) | Captain | p. | page | pp. | pages | | |

== Team statistics ==
=== Comprehensive results by tournament ===
Note: Results of Olympic qualification tournaments are not included. Last updated: 5 May 2021.

Legend

- 1st – Champions
- 2nd – Runners-up
- 3rd – Third place
- 4th – Fourth place
- Q – Qualified for forthcoming tournament
- – Hosts

| Women's team | 2000 | 2004 | 2008 | 2012 | 2016 | 2020 | Years |
|---|---|---|---|---|---|---|---|
| China | | | 5th | 5th | 7th | Q | 4 |
| Total teams | 6 | 8 | 8 | 8 | 8 | 10 | |

=== Number of appearances ===
Last updated: 5 May 2021.

Legend

- Year^{*} – As host team

| Women's team | Apps | Record streak | Active streak | Debut | Most recent | Best finish | Confederation |
|---|---|---|---|---|---|---|---|
| China | 3 | 3 | 3 | 2008^{*} | 2016 | Fifth place | Asia – AASF |

=== Best finishes ===
Last updated: 5 May 2021.

Legend

- Year^{*} – As host team

| Women's team | Best finish | Apps | Confederation |
|---|---|---|---|
| China | Fifth place (2008^{*}, 2012) | 3 | Asia – AASF |

=== Finishes in the top four ===
Last updated: 5 May 2021.

Legend

- Year^{*} – As host team

| Women's team | Total | Champions | Runners-up | Third place | Fourth place | First | Last |
|---|---|---|---|---|---|---|---|
| China | 0 | | | | | — | — |

=== Medal table ===
Last updated: 5 May 2021.

| Women's team | Gold | Silver | Bronze | Total |
|---|---|---|---|---|
| China (CHN) | 0 | 0 | 0 | 0 |

== Player statistics ==
=== Multiple appearances ===
The following table is pre-sorted by number of Olympic appearances (in descending order), year of the last Olympic appearance (in ascending order), year of the first Olympic appearance (in ascending order), date of birth (in ascending order), name of the player (in ascending order), respectively.

- Number of four-time Olympians: 0
- Number of three-time Olympians: 3
- Last updated: 26 July 2021.

Legend

- – Hosts

Female athletes who competed in water polo at three or more Olympics
| Apps | Player | Birth | Pos | Water polo tournaments | | | | | Age of first/last | ISHOF member | Note | Ref |
| Apps | Player | Birth | Pos | 1 | 2 | 3 | 4 | 5 | Age of first/last | ISHOF member | Note | Ref |
|---|---|---|---|---|---|---|---|---|---|---|---|---|
| 3 | Sun Yating | 1988 | FP | 2008 | 2012 | 2016 | | | 20/28 | | | |
| 3 | Yang Jun | 1988 | GK | 2008 | 2012 | 2016 | | | 20/28 | | | |
| 3 | Ma Huanhuan | 1990 | FP | 2008 | 2012 | 2016 | | | 18/26 | | | |

=== Top goalscorers ===
The following table is pre-sorted by number of total goals (in descending order), year of the last Olympic appearance (in ascending order), year of the first Olympic appearance (in ascending order), name of the player (in ascending order), respectively.

- Number of goalscorers (40+ goals): 0
- Number of goalscorers (30–39 goals): 1
- Number of goalscorers (20–29 goals): 0
- Last updated: 1 April 2021.

Legend

- – Hosts

Female players with 20 or more goals at the Olympics
| Rk | Player | Birth | L/R | Total goals | Water polo tournaments (goals) | | | | | Age of first/last | ISHOF member | Note | Ref |
| Rk | Player | Birth | L/R | Total goals | 1 | 2 | 3 | 4 | 5 | Age of first/last | ISHOF member | Note | Ref |
|---|---|---|---|---|---|---|---|---|---|---|---|---|---|
| 1 | Ma Huanhuan | 1990 | Right | 37 | 2008 (7) | 2012 (19) | 2016 (11) | | | 18/26 | | | |

- Official Results Books (PDF): 2008 (pp. 59–60), 2012 (pp. 350–351), 2016 (pp. 203–204).

=== Goalkeepers ===
The following table is pre-sorted by edition of the Olympics (in ascending order), cap number or name of the goalkeeper (in ascending order), respectively.

Last updated: 1 April 2021.

Legend and abbreviation

- – Hosts
- Eff % – Save efficiency (Saves / Shots)

| Year | Cap No. | Goalkeeper | Birth | Age | Saves | Shots | Eff % | ISHOF member | Note | Ref |
|---|---|---|---|---|---|---|---|---|---|---|
| 2008 | 1 | Yang Jun | 1988 | 20 | 39 | 89 | 43.8% | | Starting goalkeeper | |
| 2008 | 13 | Tan Ying | 1987 | 21 | 0 | 2 | 0.0% | | | |
| 2012 | 1 | Yang Jun (2) | 1988 | 24 | 44 | 106 | 41.5% | | Starting goalkeeper | |
| 2012 | 13 | Wang Ying | 1988 | 24 | 17 | 25 | 68.0% | | | |
| 2016 | 1 | Yang Jun (3) | 1988 | 28 | 55 | 118 | 46.6% | | Starting goalkeeper | |
| 2016 | 13 | Peng Lin | 1995 | 21 | 0 | 2 | 0.0% | | | |
| Year | Cap No. | Goalkeeper | Birth | Age | Saves | Shots | Eff % | ISHOF member | Note | Ref |

- Official Results Books (PDF): 2008 (pp. 59–60), 2012 (pp. 350–351), 2016 (pp. 203–204).

=== Top sprinters ===
The following table is pre-sorted by number of total sprints won (in descending order), year of the last Olympic appearance (in ascending order), year of the first Olympic appearance (in ascending order), name of the sprinter (in ascending order), respectively.

* Number of sprinters (30+ sprints won): 1

- Number of sprinters (20–29 sprints won): 0
- Number of sprinters (10–19 sprints won): 0
- Number of sprinters (5–9 sprints won): 1
- Last updated: 15 May 2021.

Legend and abbreviation

- – Hosts
- Eff % – Efficiency (Sprints won / Sprints contested)

Female players with 5 or more sprints won at the Olympics
| Rk | Sprinter | Birth | Total sprints won | Total sprints contested | Eff % | Water polo tournaments (sprints won / contested) | | | | | Age of first/last | ISHOF member | Note | Ref |
| Rk | Sprinter | Birth | Total sprints won | Total sprints contested | Eff % | 1 | 2 | 3 | 4 | 5 | Age of first/last | ISHOF member | Note | Ref |
|---|---|---|---|---|---|---|---|---|---|---|---|---|---|---|
| 1 | Wang Yi | 1987 | 35 | 47 | 74.5% | 2008 (18/19) | 2012 (17/28) | | | | 21/25 | | | |
| 2 | Niu Guannan | 1992 | 9 | 22 | 40.9% | 2016 (9/22) | | | | | 24/24 | | | |

- Official Results Books (PDF): 2008 (pp. 59–60), 2012 (pp. 350–351), 2016 (pp. 203–204).

== See also ==
- List of women's Olympic water polo tournament records and statistics
- Lists of Olympic water polo records and statistics
- China at the Olympics

== Sources ==
=== Official Results Books (IOC) ===
PDF documents in the LA84 Foundation Digital Library:

- Official Results Book – 2000 Olympic Games – Water Polo (download, archive)
- Official Results Book – 2004 Olympic Games – Water Polo (download, archive)
- Official Results Book – 2008 Olympic Games – Water Polo (download, archive)

PDF documents on the FINA website:

- Official Results Book – 2012 Olympic Games – Diving, Swimming, Synchronised Swimming, Water Polo (archive) (pp. 284–507)

PDF documents in the Olympic World Library:

- Official Results Book – 2016 Olympic Games – Water Polo (archive)

PDF documents on the International Olympic Committee website:

- Official Results Book – 2020 Olympic Games – Water Polo (archive)
- Official Results Book – 2024 Olympic Games – Water Polo

=== Official Reports (FINA) ===
PDF documents on the FINA website:

- HistoFINA – Water polo medalists and statistics (as of September 2019) (archive) (p. 56)
- 1870–2020 | 150 years of Water Polo – Evolution of its rules (archive)

=== Official website (IOC) ===
Water polo on the International Olympic Committee website:

- Water polo
- Women's water polo

=== Olympedia ===
Water polo on the Olympedia website:

- Water polo
- Women's water polo
- Athlete count for water polo
- Water polo venues
- Water polo at the 2000 Summer Olympics (women's tournament)
- Water polo at the 2004 Summer Olympics (women's tournament)
- Water polo at the 2008 Summer Olympics (women's tournament)
- Water polo at the 2012 Summer Olympics (women's tournament)
- Water polo at the 2016 Summer Olympics (women's tournament)
- Water polo at the 2020 Summer Olympics (women's tournament)

=== Sports Reference ===
Water polo on the Sports Reference website:

- Country Medal Leaders & Athlete Medal Leaders (1900–2016) (archived)
- Women's water polo (2000–2016) (archived)
- Water polo at the 2000 Summer Games (women's tournament) (archived)
- Water polo at the 2004 Summer Games (women's tournament) (archived)
- Water polo at the 2008 Summer Games (women's tournament) (archived)
- Water polo at the 2012 Summer Games (women's tournament) (archived)
- Water polo at the 2016 Summer Games (women's tournament) (archived)

=== Todor66 ===
Water polo on the Todor66 website:

- Water polo at the Summer Games
- Water polo at the 2000 Summer Olympics (women's tournament, women's qualification)
- Water polo at the 2004 Summer Olympics (women's tournament, women's qualification)
- Water polo at the 2008 Summer Olympics (women's tournament, women's qualification)
- Water polo at the 2012 Summer Olympics (women's tournament, women's qualification)
- Water polo at the 2016 Summer Olympics (women's tournament, women's qualification)
- Water polo at the 2020 Summer Olympics (women's tournament, women's qualification)

=== ISHOF ===
International Swimming Hall of Fame (ISHOF) website:

- Honorees Listed by Category – Water Polo
- Honorees Listed by Category – Coaches
- Honorees Listed by Category – Contributors
- Honorees by Country
- Honorees By Last Name
