= Africa Aquatics =

African continental association of swimming

- Sport: Aquatic Sports
- Membership: 53 federations
- Founded: 1970; 56 years ago
- Affiliation: World Aquatics
- Headquarters: Johannesburg
- Location: South Africa
- President: Dr Mohamed Diop
- Secretary: Mr Jace Naidoo

Official website
- africaaquatics.org

Africa Aquatics (formerly French: Confédération Africaine de Natation, English: African Swimming Confederation, popularly known by its acronym CANA), is the continental association charged with overseeing swimming for Africa. CANA was founded in 1970, with 7 members. By 2008 it had 43 members.

== Members ==
CANA is geographically divided into four Zones, each of which hosts its own Age Group Championships. The Zones are as follows:

Zone	Members				
1	Algeria	Egypt	Libya	Morocco	Tunisia
2	Cameroon	(Republic of the Congo) Congo	Ivory Coast	(Democratic Republic of the Congo) DR Congo	Gambia
2	Ghana	Guinea	Mali	Niger	
2	Nigeria	Senegal	Togo		
3	Burundi	Ethiopia	Kenya	Rwanda	
3	Sudan	Tanzania	Uganda		
4	Angola	Botswana	Comoros	Lesotho	Madagascar
4	Malawi	Mauritius	Mozambique	Namibia	Seychelles
4	South Africa	Eswatini	Zambia	Zimbabwe	

Other African FINA members:

- Benin
- Burkina Faso
- Chad
- Djibouti
- Equatorial Guinea
- Guinea-Bissau
- Liberia
- Mauritania
- Sierra Leone
- Somalia

== Competitions ==
- African Swimming Championships
- African Junior Swimming Championships
- African Masters Swimming Championships
- African Inter-Zonal Swimming Championships
