= List of men's Olympic water polo tournament top goalscorers =

This is a list of top goalscorers in the men's Olympic water polo tournament since the inaugural official edition in 1900.

== Abbreviations ==
Rk	Rank	Ref	Reference			ISHOF	International Swimming Hall of Fame
L/R	Handedness	L	Left-handed	R	Right-handed		
(C)	Captain	p.	page	pp.	pages		

== Overall top goalscorers ==
As of 2016, 57 male players have scored 30 or more goals at the Summer Olympics.

=== By confederation ===
Last updated: 1 April 2021.

Confederation	Number of top goalscorers			
Confederation	Total goals: 50+	Total goals: 40–49	Total goals: 30–39	Total
Africa – CANA	0	0	0	0
Americas – UANA	1	0	3	4
Asia – AASF	0	0	0	0
Europe – LEN	6	14	29	49
Oceania – OSA	1	0	3	4
Total	8	14	35	57

=== By team ===
Last updated: 1 April 2021.

Legend

- Team^{†} – Defunct team

Men's team	Number of top goalscorers				Confederation
Men's team	Total goals: 50+	Total goals: 40–49	Total goals: 30–39	Total	Confederation
Australia	1	0	3	4	Oceania – OSA
Croatia	0	0	2	2	Europe – LEN
France	0	0	1	1	Europe – LEN
Germany	0	1	1	2	Europe – LEN
Greece	0	2	2	4	Europe – LEN
Hungary	2	3	4	9	Europe – LEN
Italy	2	2	4	8	Europe – LEN
Montenegro	0	0	2	2	Europe – LEN
Netherlands	0	2	1	3	Europe – LEN
Russia	0	1	1	2	Europe – LEN
Serbia	1	1	2	4	Europe – LEN
Soviet Union^{†}	0	0	1	1	Europe – LEN
Spain	1	2	4	7	Europe – LEN
United States	1	0	3	4	Americas – UANA
West Germany^{†}	0	0	1	1	Europe – LEN
Yugoslavia^{†}	0	0	3	3	Europe – LEN
Total	8	14	35	57	

Notes:

- Dmitry Apanasenko (40 goals) is counted as a Russian player.
- Armando Fernández (37 goals) is counted as a West German player.
- Pietro Figlioli (47 goals) is counted as an Italian player.
- Frank Otto (38 goals) is counted as a German player.
- Iván Pérez (31 goals) is counted as a Spanish player.
- Felipe Perrone (42 goals) is counted as a Spanish player.
- Aleksandar Šapić (64 goals) is counted as a Serbian player.
- Dubravko Šimenc (30 goals) is counted as a Croatian player.
- Hagen Stamm (45 goals) is counted as a German player.
- Vladimir Vujasinović (34 goals) is counted as a Serbian player.

== Most goals scored ==
=== One match ===
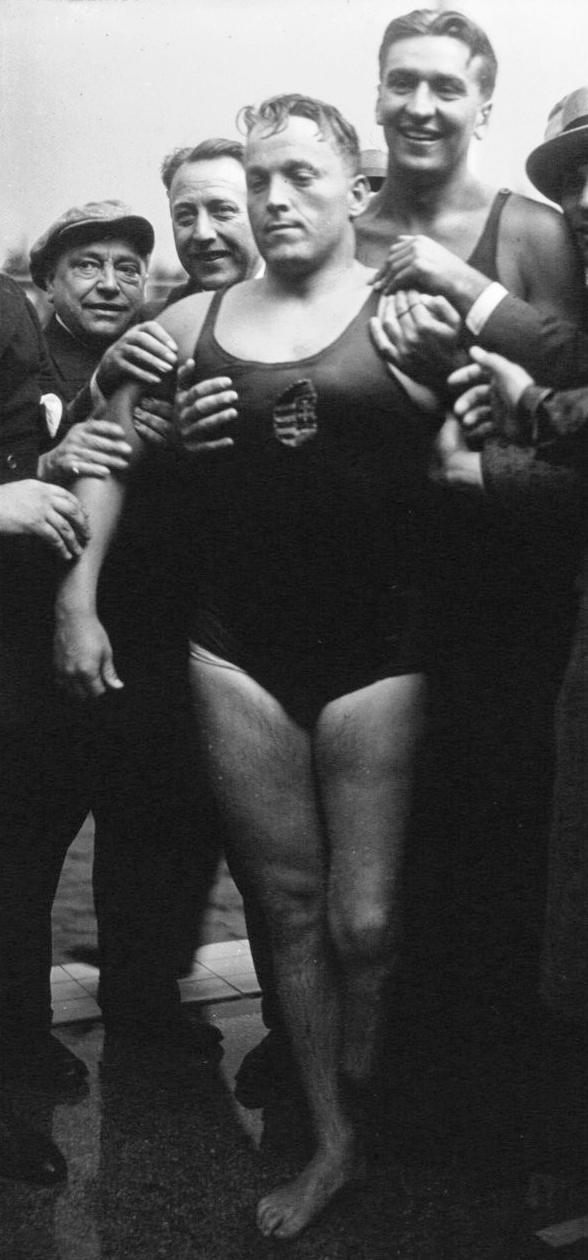
Despite his disability of losing the left leg below the knee, Olivér Halassy of Hungary scored seven goals in a match in 1932.

The following table is pre-sorted by date of the match (in ascending order), name of the player (in ascending order), respectively. Last updated: 4 August 2021.

Scoring seven or more goals in a water polo match is a great feat, as it has only been accomplished 12 times, by 12 players, in the history of men's Olympic tournament.

The first two Olympians to do so were Olivér Halassy and János Németh, with Hungary men's national team in Los Angeles on 8 August 1932. Halassy lost his left leg below the knee when he was a boy. He is the first and only amputee athlete to compete in water polo at the Summer Olympics.

The most recent player to do so was Krisztián Manhercz, with Hungary men's national team in Tokyo on 4 August 2021.

Four players have each netted nine goals in an Olympic match. Hungarian center forward János Németh is the first water polo player to achieve this feat. On 22 October 1968, Zoran Janković of Yugoslavia became the second player to do so. And Manuel Estiarte of Spain is the third player. At the 2008 Games, Aleksandar Šapić of Serbia became the first player to score nine goals in an Olympic match in the 21st century.

At the 1968 Summer Olympics, László Felkai netted seven goals in the bronze medal match on 26 October 1968, helping the Hungarian team win the match. A few hours later, Yugoslavia won the gold medal match over the Soviet Union after extra time, 13–11, despite seven goals scored by Aleksei Barkalov.

Legend and abbreviation

- – Player's team drew the match
- – Player's team lost the match
- Team – Host team
- Player^{‡} – Player who won the tournament with his team
- G – Goals
- aet – After extra time
- pso – Penalty shootout

Male players with seven or more goals in an Olympic match
#	G	Player	Birth	Age	Height	L/R	For	Result	Against	Tournament	Round	Date	Ref
1	7	Olivér Halassy^{‡}	1909	23	1.55 m (5 ft 1 in)		Hungary	18–0	Japan	Los Angeles 1932	Round-robin group	8 Aug 1932	
2	9	János Németh^{‡}	1906	26	1.85 m (6 ft 1 in)		Hungary	18–0	Japan	Los Angeles 1932	Round-robin group	8 Aug 1932	
3	8	Veit Herrmanns	1946	22	1.86 m (6 ft 1 in)		East Germany	19–2	Egypt	Mexico City 1968	Preliminary round Group B	21 Oct 1968	
4	9	Zoran Janković^{‡}	1940	28	1.78 m (5 ft 10 in)		Yugoslavia	17–2	Japan	Mexico City 1968	Preliminary round Group B	22 Oct 1968	
5	7	László Felkai	1941	27	1.80 m (5 ft 11 in)		Hungary	9–4	Italy	Mexico City 1968	Bronze medal match	26 Oct 1968	
6	7	Aleksei Barkalov	1946	22	1.80 m (5 ft 11 in)		Soviet Union	11–11; 11–13 (aet)	Yugoslavia	Mexico City 1968	Gold medal match	26 Oct 1968	
7	9	Manuel Estiarte	1961	22	1.78 m (5 ft 10 in)	Right	Spain	19–12	Brazil	Los Angeles 1984	Preliminary round Group B	1 Aug 1984	
8	8	Pierre Garsau	1961	26	1.86 m (6 ft 1 in)		France	11–4	China	Seoul 1988	Classification round 9th–12th place	30 Sep 1988	
9	7	Ivan Zaitsev	1975	29	1.86 m (6 ft 1 in)	Right	Kazakhstan	15–7	Egypt	Athens 2004	11th–12th place match	27 Aug 2004	
10	9	Aleksandar Šapić	1978	30	1.88 m (6 ft 2 in)	Right	Serbia	15–5	China	Beijing 2008	Preliminary round Group B	16 Aug 2008	
11	7	Felipe Perrone	1986	22	1.83 m (6 ft 0 in)	Right	Spain	10–6	Greece	Beijing 2008	Preliminary round Group A	18 Aug 2008	
12	7	Krisztián Manhercz	1997	24	1.91 m (6 ft 3 in)	Right	Hungary	15–11	Croatia	Tokyo 2020	Quarter-finals	4 Aug 2021	
#	G	Player	Birth	Age	Height	L/R	For	Result	Against	Tournament	Round	Date	Ref

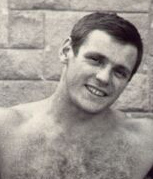
Zoran Janković of Yugoslavia scored nine goals in a match in 1968.

The following table shows the historical progression of the record of goals scored by a male water polo player in a single Olympic match. Last updated: 1 April 2021.

Legend

- Team – Host team
- Player^{‡} – Player who won the tournament with his team

Historical progression of records: Most goals scored by a male player, one match
Goals	Achievement	Year	Player	Age	Height	| L/R	Men's team	Date	Duration of record	Ref
6	Set record	1900	John Jarvis^{‡}	28			Great Britain	11 August 1900	31 years, 363 days	
6	Tied record	1908	Fernand Feyaerts	27–28			Belgium	15 July 1908	31 years, 363 days	
6	Tied record	1928	Koos Köhler	22			Netherlands	5 August 1928	31 years, 363 days	
6	Tied record	1928	Herbert Topp	28			United States	8 August 1928	31 years, 363 days	
6	Tied record	1932	Philip Daubenspeck	26			United States	6 August 1932	31 years, 363 days	
9	Broke record	1932	János Németh^{‡}	26	1.85 m (6 ft 1 in)		Hungary	8 August 1932	93 years, 204 days	
9	Tied record	1968	Zoran Janković^{‡}	28	1.78 m (5 ft 10 in)		Yugoslavia	22 October 1968	93 years, 204 days	
9	Tied record	1984	Manuel Estiarte	22	1.78 m (5 ft 10 in)	Right	Spain	1 August 1984	93 years, 204 days	
9	Tied record	2008	Aleksandar Šapić	30	1.88 m (6 ft 2 in)	Right	Serbia	16 August 2008	93 years, 204 days	
Goals	Achievement	Year	Player	Age	Height	L/R	Men's team	Date	Duration of record	Ref

=== One tournament ===
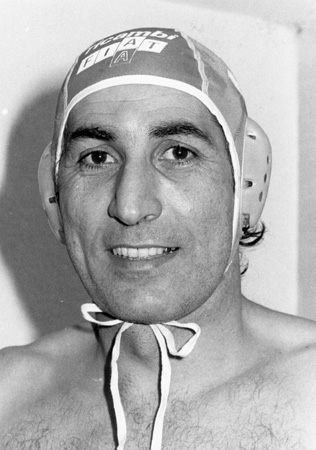
Eraldo Pizzo of Italy scored 29 goals at the 1968 Olympics.

The following table is pre-sorted by number of goals (in descending order), edition of the Olympics (in ascending order), number of matches played (in ascending order), name of the player (in ascending order), respectively. Last updated: 1 April 2021.

Five male players have scored 25 or more goals in an Olympic water polo tournament.

Spaniard Manuel Estiarte is the first and only water polo player to achieve this feat twice. At the 1984 Summer Olympics, Estiarte netted 34 goals, setting the record for the most goals scored by a water polo player in a single Olympic tournament. Four years later, he scored 27 goals in Seoul.

The most recent player to scoring 25 or more goals in a tournament was Alessandro Calcaterra, with Italy men's national team at the 2008 Beijing Olympics.

Legend

- Team – Host team
- Player^{‡} – Player who won the tournament with his team

Male players with 25 or more goals in an Olympic tournament
Rk	Year	Player	Birth	Age	Height	L/R	Goals	Matches played	Goals per match	Men's team	Finish	Ref
1	1984	Manuel Estiarte	1961	22	1.78 m (5 ft 10 in)	Right	34	7	4.857	Spain	4th of 12 teams	
2	1968	Nico van der Voet	1944	24	1.86 m (6 ft 1 in)		33	9	3.667	Netherlands	7th of 15 teams	
3	1968	Eraldo Pizzo	1938	30	1.87 m (6 ft 2 in)	Right	29	9	3.222	Italy	4th of 15 teams	
4	1988	Manuel Estiarte (2)	1961	26	1.78 m (5 ft 10 in)	Right	27	7	3.857	Spain	6th of 12 teams	
4	2008	Alessandro Calcaterra	1975	33	1.87 m (6 ft 2 in)	Right	27	8	3.375	Italy	9th of 12 teams	
6	1968	Rubén Junco	1950	18	1.54 m (5 ft 1 in)		26	8	3.250	Cuba	8th of 15 teams	
Rk	Year	Player	Birth	Age	Height	L/R	Goals	Matches played	Goals per match	Men's team	Finish	Ref

Sources:

- Official Reports (PDF): 1900–1972, 1976 (p. 497), 1980 (p. 510), 1984 (p. 534), 1988–1996;
- Official Results Books (PDF): 2000 (pp. 45–92), 2004 (p. 184), 2008 (p. 179), 2012 (p. 466), 2016 (p. 100);
- Olympedia: 1900–2016 (men's tournaments);
- Sports Reference: 1900–2016 (men's tournaments).

The following table is pre-sorted by edition of the Olympics (in ascending order), name of the team (in ascending order), number of goals (in descending order), name of the player (in ascending order), respectively. Last updated: 1 April 2021.

Legend

- Team^{*} – Host team

Male players with 20 or more goals in an Olympic tournament (ordered chronologically)
Year	Total	30+ goals		25–29 goals		20–24 goals	
1900	0	—	0	—	0	—	0
1908	0	—	0	—	0	—	0
1912	0	—	0	—	0	—	0
1920	0	—	0	—	0	—	0
1924	0	—	0	—	0	—	0
1928	0	—	0	—	0	—	0
1932	0	—	0	—	0	—	0
1936	2	—	0	—	0	Germany^{*}: Hans Schneider (22); Hungary: János Németh (20)	2
1948	0	—	0	—	0	—	0
1952	0	—	0	—	0	—	0
1956	0	—	0	—	0	—	0
1960	0	—	0	—	0	—	0
1964	0	—	0	—	0	—	0
1968	6	Netherlands: Nico van der Voet (33)	1	Cuba: Rubén Junco (26); Italy: Eraldo Pizzo (29)	2	Greece: Ioannis Palios (20); Hungary: László Felkai (24); Yugoslavia: Zoran Janković (21)	3
1972	0	—	0	—	0	—	0
Year	Total	30+ goals		25–29 goals		20–24 goals	
1976	1	—	0	—	0	Hungary: Tamás Faragó (22)	1
1980	3	—	0	—	0	Cuba: Jorge Rizo (20) (International Olympic Committee) Italy: Gianni De Magistris (20) (International Olympic Committee) Spain: Manuel Estiarte (21)	3
1984	1	Spain: Manuel Estiarte (34)	1	—	0	—	0
1988	2	—	0	Spain: Manuel Estiarte (27)	1	France: Pierre Garsau (20)	1
1992	3	—	0	—	0	Hungary: Tibor Benedek (22); Spain^{*}: Manuel Estiarte (22) (International Olympic Committee) Unified Team: (Note: In 1992, 12 of the 15 former Soviet Republics competed together as the Unified Team and marched under the Olympic Flag in the Barcelona Games.) Dmitry Apanasenko (20)	3
1996	0	—	0	—	0	—	0
2000	0	—	0	—	0	—	0
2004	0	—	0	—	0	—	0
2008	3	—	0	Italy: Alessandro Calcaterra (27)	1	Greece: Georgios Ntoskas (20); Serbia: Aleksandar Šapić (20)	2
2012	1	—	0	—	0	Serbia: Andrija Prlainović (22)	1
2016	0	—	0	—	0	—	0
2020							
Year	Total	30+ goals		25–29 goals		20–24 goals	

Sources:

- Official Reports (PDF): 1900–1972, 1976 (p. 497), 1980 (p. 510), 1984 (p. 534), 1988–1996;
- Official Results Books (PDF): 2000 (pp. 45–92), 2004 (p. 184), 2008 (p. 179), 2012 (p. 466), 2016 (p. 100);
- Olympedia: 1900–2016 (men's tournaments);
- Sports Reference: 1900–2016 (men's tournaments).

==== Top goalscorers in each tournament ====
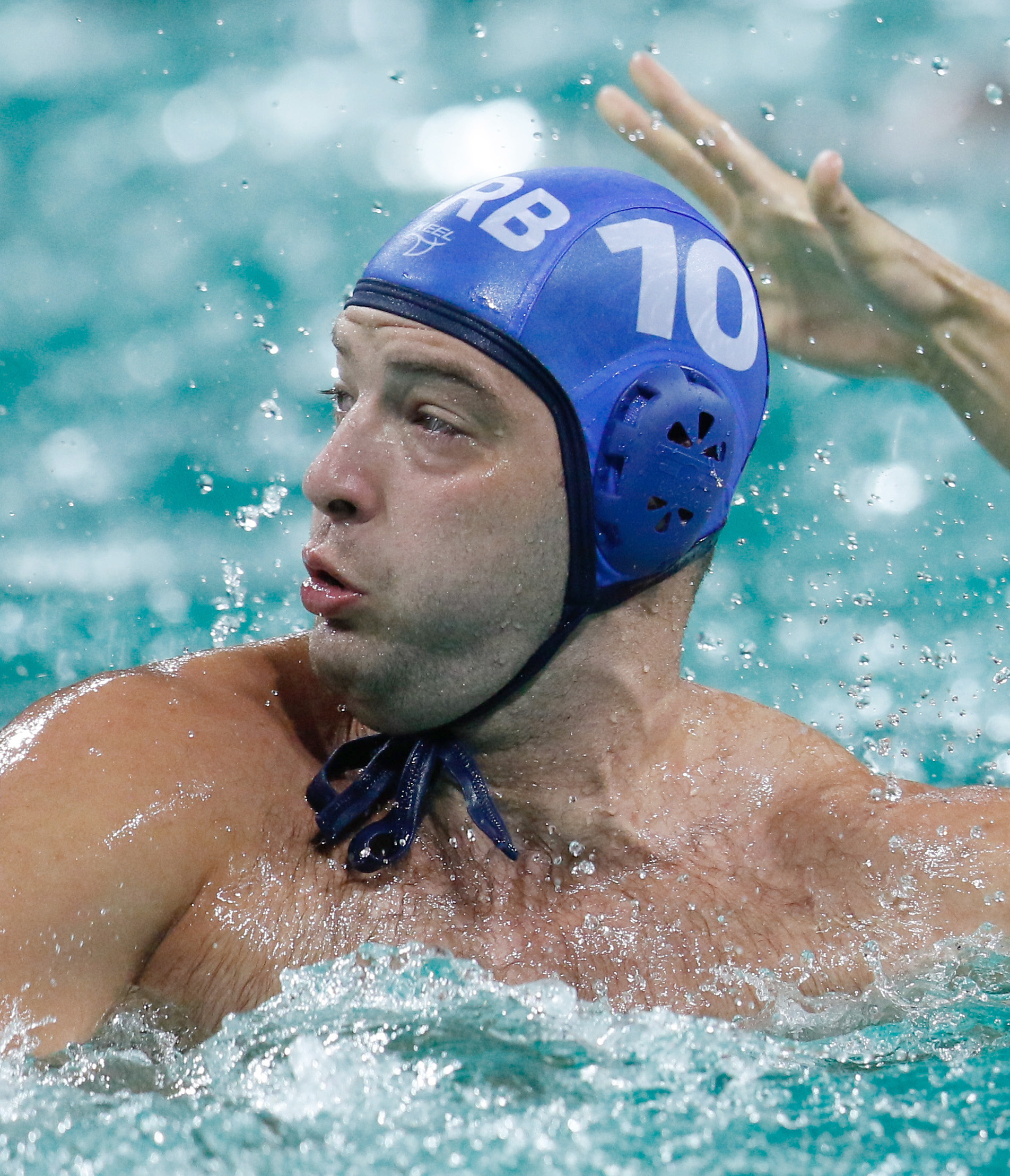
Filip Filipović scored 19 goals at the 2016 Olympics, helping Serbia win gold. He was named the Most Valuable Player of the men's water polo tournament.

The following table is pre-sorted by edition of the Olympics (in ascending order), number of matches played (in ascending order), name of the player (in ascending order), respectively. Last updated: 1 April 2021.

Hans Schneider of Germany scored 22 goals at the 1936 Berlin Olympics, which stood as an Olympic water polo record for one Games until 1968, when the Dutch player Nico van der Voet netted 33 goals in Mexico City.

At 18 years old, Manuel Estiarte of Spain made his Olympic debut at the 1980 Moscow Olympics, where he was the youngest-ever male top goalscorer with 21 goals. He was also the top goalscorer at the 1984 Los Angeles Olympics and the 1988 Seoul Olympics, with 34 and 27 goals, respectively. He was the joint top goalscorer at the 1992 Barcelona Olympics with 22 goals.

Hungarian left-handed player Tibor Benedek was the joint top goalscorer at the 1992 Games with 22 goals, and the top goalscorer at the 1996 Atlanta Olympics with 19 goals.

Aleksandar Šapić, representing FR Yugoslavia, was the top goalscorer at the 2000 Sydney Olympics with 18 goals. Four years later, he netted 18 goals for Serbia and Montenegro, becoming the top goalscorer at the 2004 Athens Olympics.

31-year-old István Szívós Sr. scored 16 goals for Hungary at the 1952 Helsinki Olympics, which stood as an age record for the oldest top goalscorer in a single Olympic water polo tournament until 2008, when 33-year-old Alessandro Calcaterra of Italy netted 27 goals in Beijing.

Left-hander Filip Filipović of Serbia was the joint top goalscorer at the 2016 Olympics, with 19 goals. He netted two goals in the gold medal match, helping the Serbian team win the Olympics.

Legend

- Team – Host team
- Player^{‡} – Player who won the tournament with his team

Male players with the most goals in each Olympic tournament
Year	Player	Birth	Age	Height	L/R	Goals	Matches played	Goals per match	Men's team	Finish	Ref
1900	John Jarvis^{‡}	1872	28			6	1	6.000	Great Britain	1st of 7 teams	
1908	Fernand Feyaerts	1880	27–28			8	3	2.667	Belgium	2nd of 4 teams	
1912	Robert Andersson	1886	25			9	4	2.250	Sweden	2nd of 6 teams	
1920	Erik Andersson	1896	24			10	4	2.500	Sweden	3rd of 12 teams	
1924	Pierre Dewin	1894	29–30			14	5	2.800	Belgium	2nd of 13 teams	
1928	Ferenc Keserű	1903	24	1.55 m (5 ft 1 in)		10	4	2.500	Hungary	2nd of 14 teams	
1932	Philip Daubenspeck	1905	26			14	4	3.500	United States	3rd of 5 teams	
1936	Hans Schneider	1909	26			22	7	3.143	Germany	2nd of 16 teams	
1948	Aldo Ghira^{‡}	1920	28			18 (Note: At the 1948 Olympics, the water polo match between Italy and Yugoslavia in Group D, and the match between Egypt and Hungary in Group E were both replayed. For more details, please see here.)	7	2.571	Italy	1st of 18 teams	
1952	Ruud van Feggelen	1924	28			16 (Note: At the 1952 Olympics, the water polo match between the Netherlands and Yugoslavia in Group C was replayed. For more details, please see here.)	8	2.000	Netherlands	5th of 21 teams	
1952	István Szívós Sr.^{‡}	1920	31	1.85 m (6 ft 1 in)	Right	16	8	2.000	Hungary	1st of 21 teams	
1956	Petre Mshvenieradze	1929	27	1.86 m (6 ft 1 in)		11	7	1.571	Soviet Union	3rd of 10 teams	
1960	Fred Tisue	1938	21	1.75 m (5 ft 9 in)		12	7	1.714	United States	7th of 16 teams	
1960	Aurel Zahan	1938	22	1.83 m (6 ft 0 in)		12	7	1.714	Romania	5th of 16 teams	
1964	Nico van der Voet	1944	20	1.86 m (6 ft 1 in)		10	7	1.429	Netherlands	8ht of 13 teams	
1968	Nico van der Voet (2)	1944	24	1.86 m (6 ft 1 in)		33	9	3.667	Netherlands	7th of 15 teams	
1972	Carlos Sánchez	1952	20	1.71 m (5 ft 7 in)		18	9	2.000	Cuba	9th of 16 teams	
1976	Tamás Faragó^{‡}	1952	23	1.94 m (6 ft 4 in)	Right	22	8	2.750	Hungary	1st of 12 teams	
1980	Manuel Estiarte	1961	18	1.78 m (5 ft 10 in)	Right	21	8	2.625	Spain	4th of 12 teams	
1984	Manuel Estiarte (2)	1961	22	1.78 m (5 ft 10 in)	Right	34	7	4.857	Spain	4th of 12 teams	
1988	Manuel Estiarte (3)	1961	26	1.78 m (5 ft 10 in)	Right	27	7	3.857	Spain	6th of 12 teams	
1992	Tibor Benedek	1972	20	1.90 m (6 ft 3 in)	Left	22	7	3.143	Hungary	6th of 12 teams	
1992	Manuel Estiarte (4)	1961	30	1.78 m (5 ft 10 in)	Right	22	7	3.143	Spain	2nd of 12 teams	
1996	Tibor Benedek (2)	1972	24	1.90 m (6 ft 3 in)	Left	19	8	2.375	Hungary	4th of 12 teams	
2000	Aleksandar Šapić	1978	22	1.88 m (6 ft 2 in)	Right	18	8	2.250	Yugoslavia	3rd of 12 teams	
2004	Aleksandar Šapić (2)	1978	26	1.88 m (6 ft 2 in)	Right	18	8	2.250	Serbia and Montenegro	2nd of 12 teams	
2008	Alessandro Calcaterra	1975	33	1.87 m (6 ft 2 in)	Right	27	8	3.375	Italy	9th of 12 teams	
2012	Andrija Prlainović	1987	25	1.87 m (6 ft 2 in)	Right	22	8	2.750	Serbia	3rd of 12 teams	
2016	Filip Filipović^{‡}	1987	29	1.96 m (6 ft 5 in)	Left	19	8	2.375	Serbia	1st of 12 teams	
2016	Guillermo Molina	1984	32	1.95 m (6 ft 5 in)	Right	19	8	2.375	Spain	7th of 12 teams	
Year	Player	Birth	Age	Height	L/R	Goals	Matches played	Goals per match	Men's team	Finish	Ref

Sources:

- Official Reports (PDF): 1900–1972, 1976 (p. 497), 1980 (p. 510), 1984 (p. 534), 1988–1996;
- Official Results Books (PDF): 2000 (pp. 45–92), 2004 (p. 184), 2008 (p. 179), 2012 (p. 466), 2016 (p. 100);
- Olympedia: 1900–2016 (men's tournaments);
- Sports Reference: 1900–2016 (men's tournaments).

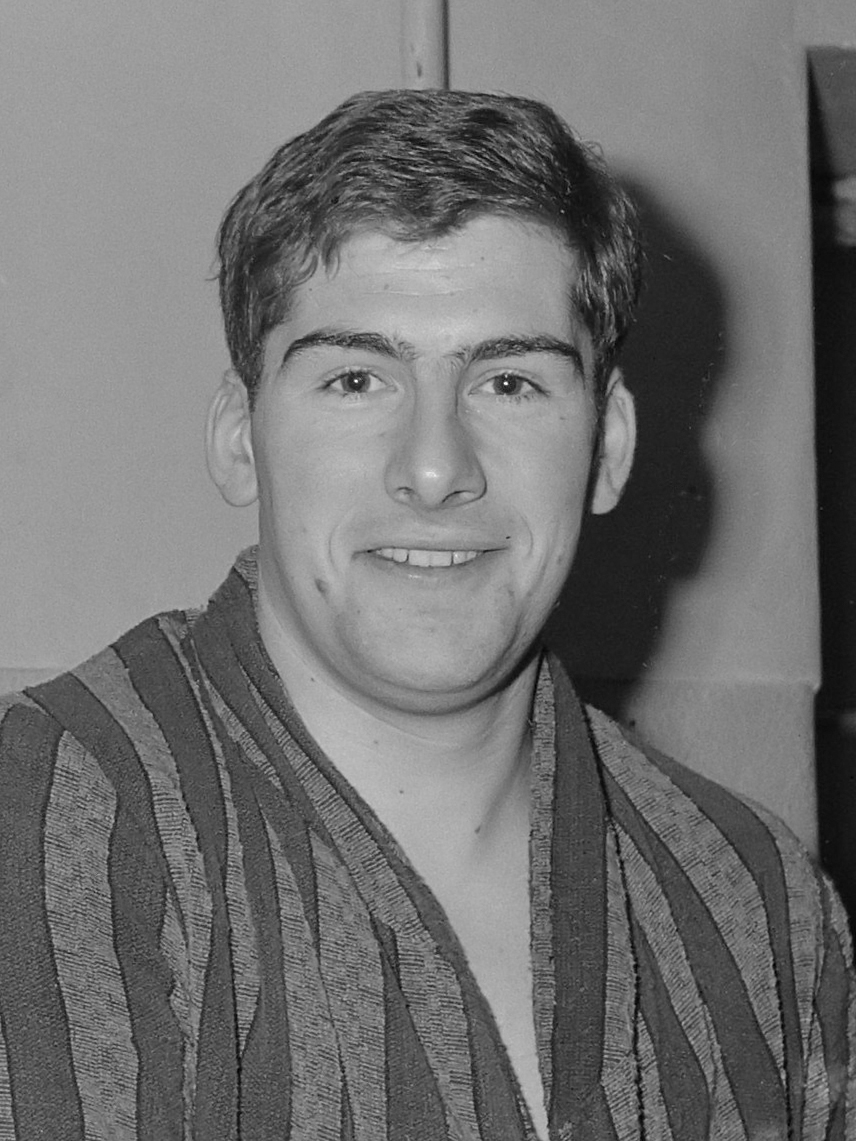
Nico van der Voet of the Netherlands scored 33 goals at the 1968 Olympics.

The following table shows the historical progression of the record of goals scored by a male water polo player in a single Olympic tournament. Last updated: 1 April 2021.

Legend

- Team – Host team
- Player^{‡} – Player who won the tournament with his team

Historical progression of records: Most goals scored by a male player, one tournament
Goals	Achievement	Year	Player	Age	Height	L/R	Men's team	Date	Duration of record	Ref
6	Set record	1900	John Jarvis^{‡}	28			Great Britain	12 August 1900	7 years, 345 days	
8	Broke record	1908	Fernand Feyaerts	27–28			Belgium	22 July 1908	3 years, 360 days	
9	Broke record	1912	Robert Andersson	25			Sweden	16 July 1912	8 years, 44 days	
10	Broke record	1920	Erik Andersson	24			Sweden	29 August 1920	3 years, 326 days	
14	Broke record	1924	Pierre Dewin	29–30			Belgium	20 July 1924	12 years, 26 days	
14	Tied record	1932	Philip Daubenspeck	26			United States	13 August 1932	12 years, 26 days	
22	Broke record	1936	Hans Schneider	26			Germany	15 August 1936	32 years, 72 days	
33	Broke record	1968	Nico van der Voet	24	1.86 m (6 ft 1 in)		Netherlands	26 October 1968	15 years, 289 days	
34	Broke record	1984	Manuel Estiarte	22	1.78 m (5 ft 10 in)	Right	Spain	10 August 1984	41 years, 202 days	
Goals	Achievement	Year	Player	Age	Height	L/R	Men's team	Date	Duration of record	Ref

=== All-time ===
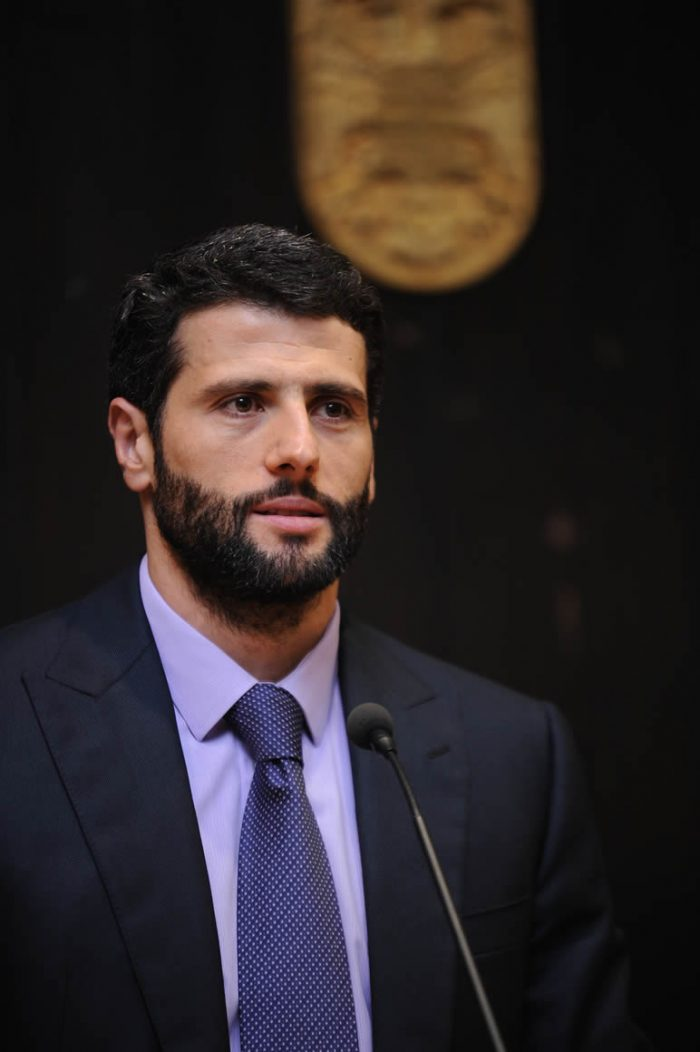
Aleksandar Šapić scored 64 goals at four Olympics (1996–2008).

The following table is pre-sorted by number of total goals (in descending order), number of total Olympic matches played (in ascending order), date of the last Olympic match played (in ascending order), date of the first Olympic match played (in ascending order), name of the player (in ascending order), respectively. Last updated: 1 April 2021.

Six-time Olympian Manuel Estiarte holds the record for the most goals scored by a water polo player in Olympic history, with 127 goals, far more than any other player. At his first three Olympics (1980–1988), Estiarte netted 82 goals.

Hungarian left-hander Tibor Benedek scored 65 goals at five Olympics (1992–2008), and his teammate Tamás Kásás netted 56 goals between 1996 and 2012.

Aleksandar Šapić, representing FR Yugoslavia in 1996 and 2000, Serbia and Montenegro in 2004, and Serbia in 2008, scored 64 goals in 32 matches.

Tony Azevedo of the United States holds the record for the most goals scored by a non-European water polo player in Olympic history, with 61 goals at five Olympics (2000–2016).

Gianni De Magistris is the top scorer for the Italy men's Olympic water polo team, with 59 goals (1968–1984). His compatriot Eraldo Pizzo netted 53 goals at four Olympics between 1960 and 1972.

Charles Turner, representing Australia between 1976 and 1984, scored 50 goals in 23 matches.

Legend

- – Hosts

All-time male players with 50 or more goals at the Olympics
Rk	Player	Birth	Height	L/R	Men's team	Total goals	Total matches played	Goals per match	Tournaments (goals)						Period (age of first/last)	Medals				Ref
Rk	Player	Birth	Height	L/R	Men's team	Total goals	Total matches played	Goals per match	1	2	3	4	5	6	Period (age of first/last)	G	S	B	T	Ref
1	Manuel Estiarte	1961	1.78 m (5 ft 10 in)	Right	Spain	127	45	2.822	1980 (21)	1984 (34)	1988 (27)	1992 (22)	1996 (13)	2000 (10)	20 years (18/38)	1	1	0	2	
2	Tibor Benedek	1972	1.90 m (6 ft 3 in)	Left	Hungary	65	37	1.757	1992 (22)	1996 (19)	2000 (9)	2004 (5)	2008 (10)		16 years (20/36)	3	0	0	3	
3	Aleksandar Šapić	1978	1.88 m (6 ft 2 in)	Right	Yugoslavia	64	32	2.000	1996 (8)	2000 (18)					12 years (18/30)	0	1	2	3	
3	Aleksandar Šapić	1978	1.88 m (6 ft 2 in)	Right	Serbia and Montenegro	64	32	2.000			2004 (18)				12 years (18/30)	0	1	2	3	
3	Aleksandar Šapić	1978	1.88 m (6 ft 2 in)	Right	Serbia	64	32	2.000				2008 (20)			12 years (18/30)	0	1	2	3	
4	Tony Azevedo	1981	1.85 m (6 ft 1 in)	Right	United States	61	35	1.743	2000 (13)	2004 (15)	2008 (17)	2012 (11)	2016 (5)		16 years (18/34)	0	1	0	1	
5	Gianni De Magistris	1950	1.85 m (6 ft 1 in)	Right	Italy	59	40	1.475	1968 (6)	1972 (11)	1976 (11)	1980 (20)	1984 (11)		16 years (17/33)	0	1	0	1	
6	Tamás Kásás	1976	2.00 m (6 ft 7 in)	Right	Hungary	56	38	1.474	1996 (13)	2000 (12)	2004 (14)	2008 (8)	2012 (9)		16 years (20/36)	3	0	0	3	
7	Eraldo Pizzo	1938	1.87 m (6 ft 2 in)	Right	Italy	53	29	1.828	1960 (7)	1964 (5)	1968 (29)	1972 (12)			12 years (22/34)	1	0	0	1	
8	Charles Turner	1952	1.86 m (6 ft 1 in)	Right	Australia	50	23	2.174	1976 (15)	1980 (17)	1984 (18)				8 years (23/31)	0	0	0	0	

Sources:

- Official Reports (PDF): 1900–1972, 1976 (p. 497), 1980 (p. 510), 1984 (p. 534), 1988–1996;
- Official Results Books (PDF): 2000 (pp. 45–92), 2004 (p. 184), 2008 (p. 179), 2012 (p. 466), 2016 (p. 100);
- Olympedia: 1900–2016 (men's tournaments);
- Sports Reference: 1900–2016 (men's tournaments).

The following table is pre-sorted by edition of the Olympics (in ascending order), name of the team (in ascending order), number of total goals (in descending order), name of the player (in ascending order), respectively. Last updated: 1 April 2021.

Legend

- Team^{*} – Host team

All-time male players with 30 or more goals at the Olympics (ordered chronologically)
Year	Total	Total goals: 50+		Total goals: 40–49		Total goals: 30–39	
1900	0	—	0	—	0	—	0
1908	0	—	0	—	0	—	0
1912	0	—	0	—	0	—	0
1920	0	—	0	—	0	—	0
1924	0	—	0	—	0	—	0
1928	0	—	0	—	0	—	0
1932	0	—	0	—	0	—	0
1936	1	—	0	—	0	Hungary: János Németh (32)	1
1948	0	—	0	—	0	—	0
1952	1	—	0	—	0	Netherlands: Ruud van Feggelen (32)	1
1956	0	—	0	—	0	—	0
1960	0	—	0	—	0	—	0
1964	0	—	0	—	0	—	0
1968	3	—	0	Italy: Eraldo Pizzo (41); Netherlands: Nico van der Voet (43)	2	Hungary: László Felkai (34)	1
1972	4	Italy: Eraldo Pizzo (53)	1	—	0	United States: Bruce Bradley (35); Yugoslavia: Zoran Janković (34), Mirko Sandić (31)	3
Year	Total	Total goals: 50+		Total goals: 40–49		Total goals: 30–39	
1976	2	—	0	—	0	Soviet Union: Aleksei Barkalov (30); Yugoslavia: Uroš Marović (30)	2
1980	4	—	0	Hungary: Tamás Faragó (42) (International Olympic Committee) Italy: Gianni De Magistris (48)	2	(International Olympic Committee) Australia: Charles Turner (32); Soviet Union^{*}: Aleksei Barkalov (38)	2
1984	5	Australia: Charles Turner (50); Italy: Gianni De Magistris (59); Spain: Manuel Estiarte (55)	3	—	0	Greece: Sotirios Stathakis (30); West Germany: Armando Fernández (33)	2
1988	6	Spain: Manuel Estiarte (82)	1	—	0	Greece: Antonios Aronis (33), Kyriakos Giannopoulos (31); West Germany: Frank Otto (34), Hagen Stamm (33), Armando Fernández (37)	5
1992	8	Spain^{*}: Manuel Estiarte (104)	1	Germany: Hagen Stamm (45); Greece: Kyriakos Giannopoulos (44)	2	Australia: Christopher Wybrow (36), Geoffrey Clark (32); France: Pierre Garsau (33); Germany: Frank Otto (38) (International Olympic Committee) Unified Team: Dmitry Apanasenko (34)	5
1996	3	Spain: Manuel Estiarte (117)	1	Hungary: Tibor Benedek (41); Russia: Dmitry Apanasenko (40)	2	—	0
2000	7	Hungary: Tibor Benedek (50); Spain: Manuel Estiarte (127)	2	Netherlands: Harry van der Meer (40)	1	Spain: Pedro García (35), Jordi Sans (33), Salvador Gómez (30); United States: Chris Humbert (37)	4
Year	Total	Total goals: 50+		Total goals: 40–49		Total goals: 30–39	
2004	7	Hungary: Tibor Benedek (55)	1	Serbia and Montenegro: Aleksandar Šapić (44)	1	Croatia: Dubravko Šimenc (30); Hungary: Tamás Kásás (39); Russia: Aleksandr Yeryshov (37); Spain: Salvador Gómez (37); United States: Wolf Wigo (31)	5
2008	10	Hungary: Tibor Benedek (65); Serbia: Aleksandar Šapić (64)	2	Hungary: Tamás Kásás (47); Italy: Alessandro Calcaterra (46); United States: Tony Azevedo (45)	3	Greece: Georgios Afroudakis (36); Hungary: Gergely Kiss (38); Italy: Alberto Angelini (35), Leonardo Sottani (30); Serbia: Vladimir Vujasinović (34)	5
2012	11	Hungary: Tamás Kásás (56); United States: Tony Azevedo (56)	2	Greece: Georgios Afroudakis (40); Hungary: Gergely Kiss (46), Péter Biros (40)	3	Australia: Thomas Whalan (32); Hungary: Norbert Madaras (32); Italy: Maurizio Felugo (34), Pietro Figlioli (33); Spain: Felipe Perrone (32), Iván Pérez (31)	6
2016	11	United States: Tony Azevedo (61)	1	Brazil^{*}: Felipe Perrone (42); Italy: Pietro Figlioli (47); Serbia: Filip Filipović (41); Spain: Guillermo Molina (41)	4	Croatia: Sandro Sukno (31); Hungary: Dénes Varga (33); Italy: Valentino Gallo (33); Montenegro: Aleksandar Ivović (38), Mlađan Janović (31); Serbia: Andrija Prlainović (31)	6
2020							
Year	Total	Total goals: 50+		Total goals: 40–49		Total goals: 30–39	

Sources:

- Official Reports (PDF): 1900–1972, 1976 (p. 497), 1980 (p. 510), 1984 (p. 534), 1988–1996;
- Official Results Books (PDF): 2000 (pp. 45–92), 2004 (p. 184), 2008 (p. 179), 2012 (p. 466), 2016 (p. 100);
- Olympedia: 1900–2016 (men's tournaments);
- Sports Reference: 1900–2016 (men's tournaments).

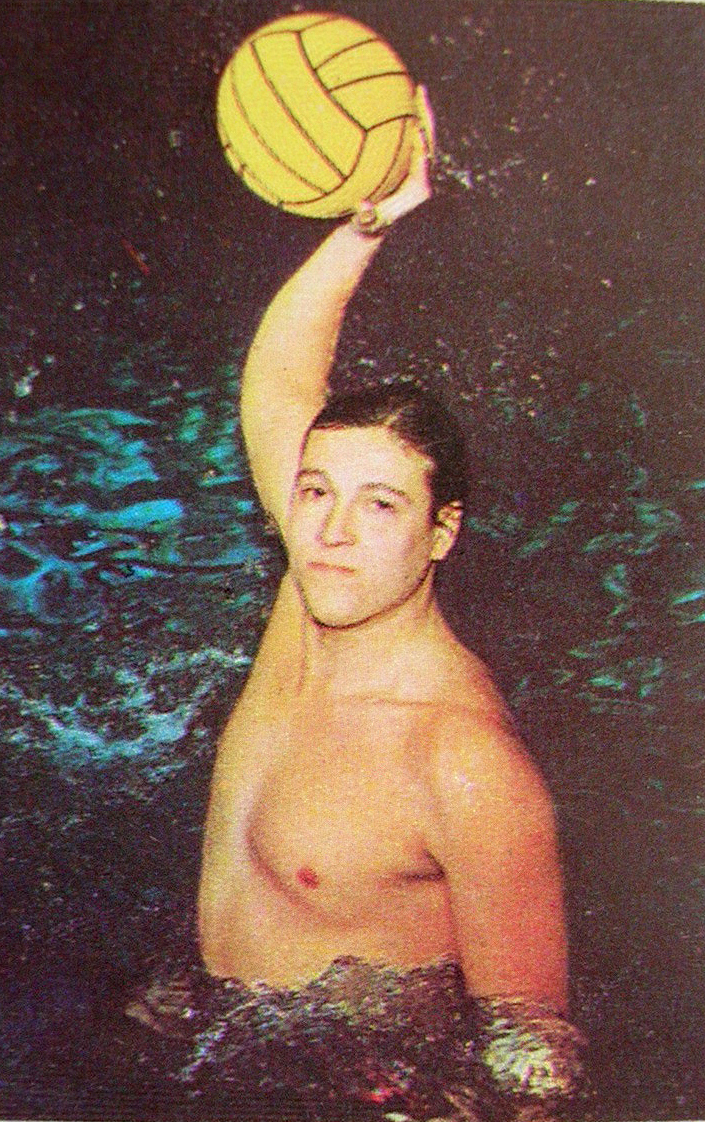
Gianni De Magistris of Italy scored 59 goals at five Olympics (1968–1984).

The following table shows the historical progression of the record of total goals scored by a male water polo player at the Summer Olympics. Last updated: 1 April 2021.

Legend

- Team – Host team
- Player^{‡} – Player who won the tournament with his team

Historical progression of records: Most goals scored by a male player, all-time
Total goals	Achievement	Year	Player	Age	Height	L/R	Men's team	Date	Duration of record	Ref
32	Set record	1936	János Németh^{‡}	30	1.85 m (6 ft 1 in)		Hungary	15 August 1936	32 years, 72 days	
32	Tied record	1952	Ruud van Feggelen	28			Netherlands	2 August 1952	32 years, 72 days	
43	Broke record	1968	Nico van der Voet	24	1.86 m (6 ft 1 in)		Netherlands	26 October 1968	3 years, 314 days	
53	Broke record	1972	Eraldo Pizzo	34	1.87 m (6 ft 2 in)	Right	Italy	4 September 1972	11 years, 341 days	
59	Broke record	1984	Gianni De Magistris	33	1.85 m (6 ft 1 in)	Right	Italy	10 August 1984	4 years, 52 days	
82	Broke record	1988	Manuel Estiarte	26	1.78 m (5 ft 10 in)	Right	Spain	1 October 1988	3 years, 313 days	
104	Broke record	1992	Manuel Estiarte (2)	30	1.78 m (5 ft 10 in)	Right	Spain	9 August 1992	3 years, 354 days	
117	Broke record	1996	Manuel Estiarte^{‡} (3)	34	1.78 m (5 ft 10 in)	Right	Spain	28 July 1996	4 years, 65 days	
127	Broke record	2000	Manuel Estiarte (4)	38	1.78 m (5 ft 10 in)	Right	Spain	1 October 2000	25 years, 150 days	
Total goals	Achievement	Year	Player	Age	Height	L/R	Men's team	Date	Duration of record	Ref

== Top goalscorers by team ==
The following tables are pre-sorted by number of total goals (in descending order), year of the last Olympic appearance (in ascending order), year of the first Olympic appearance (in ascending order), name of the player (in ascending order), respectively.

Legend

- Year^{*} – As host team
- Team^{†} – Defunct team

=== Argentina ===
- Men's national team: Argentina
- Team appearances: 4 (1928, 1948–1952, 1960)
- As host team: —
- Number of goalscorers (50+ goals): 0
- Number of goalscorers (40–49 goals): 0
- Number of goalscorers (30–39 goals): 0
- Last updated: 1 April 2021.

=== Australia ===
- Men's national team: Australia
- Team appearances: 17 (1948–1964, 1972–1992, 2000^{*}–2020)
- As host team: 1956^{*}, 2000^{*}

* Number of goalscorers (50+ goals): 1

- Number of goalscorers (40–49 goals): 0
- Number of goalscorers (30–39 goals): 3
- Last updated: 1 April 2021.

Legend

- – Hosts

Male players with 30 or more goals at the Olympics
Rk	Player	Birth	L/R	Total goals	Water polo tournaments (goals)					Age of first/last	ISHOF member	Note	Ref
Rk	Player	Birth	L/R	Total goals	1	2	3	4	5	Age of first/last	ISHOF member	Note	Ref
1	Charles Turner	1952	Right	50	1976 (15)	1980 (17)	1984 (18)			23/31			
2	Christopher Wybrow	1961		36	1984 (15)	1988 (10)	1992 (11)			22/30			
3	Geoffrey Clark	1969		32	1988 (14)	1992 (18)				19/23			
3	Thomas Whalan	1980	Right	32	2000 (3)	2004 (14)	2008 (7)	2012 (8)		19/31			

Sources:

- Official Reports (PDF): 1948–1964, 1972–1992;
- Official Results Books (PDF): 2000 (pp. 48, 52, 56, 65–66, 71, 73, 76), 2004 (pp. 187–188), 2008 (pp. 181–182), 2012 (pp. 468–469), 2016 (pp. 103–104).

Note:

- Pietro Figlioli is listed in section Italy.

=== Austria ===
- Men's national team: Austria
- Team appearances: 3 (1912, 1936, 1952)
- As host team: —
- Number of goalscorers (50+ goals): 0
- Number of goalscorers (40–49 goals): 0
- Number of goalscorers (30–39 goals): 0
- Last updated: 1 April 2021.

=== Belgium ===
- Men's national team: Belgium
- Team appearances: 11 (1900, 1908–1928, 1936–1952, 1960–1964)
- As host team: 1920^{*}

* Number of goalscorers (50+ goals): 0

- Number of goalscorers (40–49 goals): 0
- Number of goalscorers (30–39 goals): 0
- Last updated: 1 April 2021.

=== Brazil ===
- Men's national team: Brazil
- Team appearances: 8 (1920, 1932, 1952, 1960–1968, 1984, 2016^{*})
- As host team: 2016^{*}

* Number of goalscorers (50+ goals): 0

- Number of goalscorers (40–49 goals): 0
- Number of goalscorers (30–39 goals): 0
- Last updated: 1 April 2021.

Note:

- Felipe Perrone is listed in section Spain.

=== Bulgaria ===
- Men's national team: Bulgaria
- Team appearances: 2 (1972, 1980)
- As host team: —
- Number of goalscorers (50+ goals): 0
- Number of goalscorers (40–49 goals): 0
- Number of goalscorers (30–39 goals): 0
- Last updated: 1 April 2021.

=== Canada ===
- Men's national team: Canada
- Team appearances: 4 (1972–1976^{*}, 1984, 2008)
- As host team: 1976^{*}

* Number of goalscorers (50+ goals): 0

- Number of goalscorers (40–49 goals): 0
- Number of goalscorers (30–39 goals): 0
- Last updated: 1 April 2021.

=== Chile ===
- Men's national team: Chile
- Team appearances: 1 (1948)
- As host team: —
- Number of goalscorers (50+ goals): 0
- Number of goalscorers (40–49 goals): 0
- Number of goalscorers (30–39 goals): 0
- Last updated: 1 April 2021.

=== China ===
- Men's national team: China
- Team appearances: 3 (1984–1988, 2008^{*})
- As host team: 2008^{*}
- Number of goalscorers (50+ goals): 0
- Number of goalscorers (40–49 goals): 0
- Number of goalscorers (30–39 goals): 0
- Last updated: 1 April 2021.

=== Croatia ===
- Men's national team: Croatia
- Team appearances: 7 (1996–2020)
- As host team: —
- Related team: Yugoslavia^{†}

* Number of goalscorers (50+ goals): 0

- Number of goalscorers (40–49 goals): 0
- Number of goalscorers (30–39 goals): 2
- Last updated: 1 April 2021.

Abbreviation

- CRO – Croatia
- YUG – Yugoslavia

Male players with 30 or more goals at the Olympics
Rk	Player	Birth	L/R	Total goals	Water polo tournaments (goals)					Age of first/last	ISHOF member	Note	Ref
Rk	Player	Birth	L/R	Total goals	1	2	3	4	5	Age of first/last	ISHOF member	Note	Ref
1	Sandro Sukno	1990	Right	31	2012 (14)	2016 (17)				22/26			
2	Dubravko Šimenc	1966	Right	30	1988; YUG (3)		1996; CRO (14)	2000; CRO (9)	2004; CRO (4)	21/37		Flag bearer for Croatia (2004)	

Sources:

- Official Reports (PDF): 1988, 1996;
- Official Results Books (PDF): 2000 (pp. 48, 51, 54, 79, 82, 86–87, 92), 2004 (pp. 191–192), 2008 (pp. 190–191), 2012 (pp. 471–472), 2016 (pp. 109–110).

=== Cuba ===
- Men's national team: Cuba
- Team appearances: 5 (1968–1980, 1992)
- As host team: —
- Number of goalscorers (50+ goals): 0
- Number of goalscorers (40–49 goals): 0
- Number of goalscorers (30–39 goals): 0
- Last updated: 1 April 2021.

Note:

- Iván Pérez is listed in section Spain.

=== Czechoslovakia ===
- Men's national team: Czechoslovakia^{†}
- Team appearances: 5 (1920–1928, 1936, 1992)
- As host team: —
- Related team: Slovakia
- Number of goalscorers (50+ goals): 0
- Number of goalscorers (40–49 goals): 0
- Number of goalscorers (30–39 goals): 0
- Last updated: 1 April 2021.

=== East Germany ===
- Men's national team: East Germany^{†}
- Team appearances: 1 (1968)
- As host team: —
- Related teams: Germany, United Team of Germany^{†}
- Number of goalscorers (50+ goals): 0
- Number of goalscorers (40–49 goals): 0
- Number of goalscorers (30–39 goals): 0
- Last updated: 1 April 2021.

=== Egypt ===
- Men's national team: Egypt
- Team appearances: 6 (1948–1952, 1960–1968, 2004)
- As host team: —

* Number of goalscorers (50+ goals): 0

- Number of goalscorers (40–49 goals): 0
- Number of goalscorers (30–39 goals): 0
- Last updated: 1 April 2021.

=== France ===
- Men's national team: France
- Team appearances: 11 (1900^{*}, 1912–1928, 1936–1948, 1960, 1988–1992, 2016)
- As host team: 1900^{*}, 1924^{*}

* Number of goalscorers (50+ goals): 0

- Number of goalscorers (40–49 goals): 0
- Number of goalscorers (30–39 goals): 1
- Last updated: 1 April 2021.

Male players with 30 or more goals at the Olympics
Rk	Player	Birth	L/R	Total goals	Water polo tournaments (goals)					Age of first/last	ISHOF member	Note	Ref
Rk	Player	Birth	L/R	Total goals	1	2	3	4	5	Age of first/last	ISHOF member	Note	Ref
1	Pierre Garsau	1961		33	1988 (20)	1992 (13)				26/30			

Sources:

- Official Reports (PDF): 1900, 1912–1928, 1936–1948, 1960, 1988–1992;
- Official Results Books (PDF): 2016 (pp. 114–115).

=== Germany ===
- Men's national team: Germany
- Team appearances: 9 (1900, 1928–1936^{*}, 1952, 1992–1996, 2004–2008)
- As host team: 1936^{*}
- Related teams: United Team of Germany^{†}, East Germany^{†}, West Germany^{†}
- Number of goalscorers (50+ goals): 0
- Number of goalscorers (40–49 goals): 1
- Number of goalscorers (30–39 goals): 1
- Last updated: 1 April 2021.

Abbreviation

- FRG – West Germany
- GER – Germany

Male players with 30 or more goals at the Olympics
Rk	Player	Birth	L/R	Total goals	Water polo tournaments (goals)					Age of first/last	ISHOF member	Note	Ref
Rk	Player	Birth	L/R	Total goals	1	2	3	4	5	Age of first/last	ISHOF member	Note	Ref
1	Hagen Stamm	1960	Right	45	1984; FRG (18)	1988; FRG (15)	1992; GER (12)			24/32			
2	Frank Otto	1959	Left	38	1984; FRG (18)	1988; FRG (16)	1992; GER (4)			25/33			

Sources:

- Official Reports (PDF): 1900, 1928–1936, 1952, 1984–1996;
- Official Results Books (PDF): 2004 (pp. 199–200), 2008 (pp. 196–197).

=== Great Britain ===
- Men's national team: Great Britain
- Team appearances: 11 (1900, 1908^{*}–1928, 1936–1956, 2012^{*})
- As host team: 1908^{*}, 1948^{*}, 2012^{*}

* Number of goalscorers (50+ goals): 0

- Number of goalscorers (40–49 goals): 0
- Number of goalscorers (30–39 goals): 0
- Last updated: 1 April 2021.

=== Greece ===
- Men's national team: Greece
- Team appearances: 16 (1920–1924, 1948, 1968–1972, 1980–2020)
- As host team: 2004^{*}

* Number of goalscorers (50+ goals): 0

- Number of goalscorers (40–49 goals): 2
- Number of goalscorers (30–39 goals): 2
- Last updated: 1 April 2021.

Legend

- – Hosts

Male players with 30 or more goals at the Olympics
Rk	Player	Birth	L/R	Total goals	Water polo tournaments (goals)					Age of first/last	ISHOF member	Note	Ref
Rk	Player	Birth	L/R	Total goals	1	2	3	4	5	Age of first/last	ISHOF member	Note	Ref
1	Kyriakos Giannopoulos	1959		44	1980 (7)	1984 (6)	1988 (18)	1992 (13)		21/33			
2	Georgios Afroudakis	1976	Right	40	1996 (10)	2000 (8)	2004 (9)	2008 (9)	2012 (4)	19/35			
3	Antonios Aronis	1957		33	1980 (4)	1984 (13)	1988 (16)			23/31			
4	Sotirios Stathakis	1953		30	1980 (16)	1984 (14)				27/31			

Sources:

- Official Reports (PDF): 1920–1924, 1948, 1968–1972, 1980–1996;
- Official Results Books (PDF): 2000 (pp. 57, 59, 61, 80–81, 86, 88, 91), 2004 (pp. 203–204), 2008 (pp. 199–200), 2012 (pp. 478–479), 2016 (pp. 117–118).

=== Hungary ===
- Men's national team: Hungary
- Team appearances: 23 (1912, 1924–1980, 1988–2020)
- As host team: —

* Number of goalscorers (50+ goals): 2

- Number of goalscorers (40–49 goals): 3
- Number of goalscorers (30–39 goals): 4
- Last updated: 1 April 2021.

Male players with 30 or more goals at the Olympics
Rk	Player	Birth	L/R	Total goals	Water polo tournaments (goals)					Age of first/last	ISHOF member	Note	Ref
Rk	Player	Birth	L/R	Total goals	1	2	3	4	5	Age of first/last	ISHOF member	Note	Ref
1	Tibor Benedek	1972	Left	65	1992 (22)	1996 (19)	2000 (9)	2004 (5)	2008 (10)	20/36	2016		
2	Tamás Kásás	1976	Right	56	1996 (13)	2000 (12)	2004 (14)	2008 (8)	2012 (9)	20/36	2016		
3	Gergely Kiss	1977	Left	46	2000 (14)	2004 (15)	2008 (9)	2012 (8)		23/34	2016		
4	Tamás Faragó	1952	Right	42	1972 (6)	1976 (22)	1980 (14)			20/27	1993		
5	Péter Biros	1976	Right	40	2000 (4)	2004 (7)	2008 (13)	2012 (16)		24/36	2016	Flag bearer for Hungary (2012)	
6	László Felkai	1941		34	1960 (4)	1964 (6)	1968 (24)			19/27			
7	Dénes Varga	1987	Right	33	2008 (10)	2012 (9)	2016 (14)			21/29			
8	János Németh	1906		32	1932 (12)	1936 (20)				26/30	1969		
8	Norbert Madaras	1979	Left	32	2004 (5)	2008 (9)	2012 (18)			24/32			
Rk	Player	Birth	L/R	Total goals	1	2	3	4	5	Age of first/last	ISHOF member	Note	Ref
Rk	Player	Birth	L/R	Total goals	Water polo tournaments (goals)					Age of first/last	ISHOF member	Note	Ref

Sources:

- Official Reports (PDF): 1912, 1924–1980, 1988–1996;
- Official Results Books (PDF): 2000 (pp. 45, 50, 55, 78, 81, 84, 87, 90), 2004 (pp. 207–208), 2008 (pp. 202–203), 2012 (pp. 481–482), 2016 (pp. 120–121).

=== Iceland ===
- Men's national team: Iceland
- Team appearances: 1 (1936)
- As host team: —
- Number of goalscorers (50+ goals): 0
- Number of goalscorers (40–49 goals): 0
- Number of goalscorers (30–39 goals): 0
- Last updated: 1 April 2021.

=== India ===
- Men's national team: India
- Team appearances: 2 (1948–1952)
- As host team: —
- Number of goalscorers (50+ goals): 0
- Number of goalscorers (40–49 goals): 0
- Number of goalscorers (30–39 goals): 0
- Last updated: 1 April 2021.

=== Iran ===
- Men's national team: Iran
- Team appearances: 1 (1976)
- As host team: —
- Number of goalscorers (50+ goals): 0
- Number of goalscorers (40–49 goals): 0
- Number of goalscorers (30–39 goals): 0
- Last updated: 1 April 2021.

=== Republic of Ireland ===
- Men's national team: Ireland
- Team appearances: 2 (1924–1928)
- As host team: —
- Number of goalscorers (50+ goals): 0
- Number of goalscorers (40–49 goals): 0
- Number of goalscorers (30–39 goals): 0
- Last updated: 1 April 2021.

=== Italy ===
- Men's national team: Italy
- Team appearances: 21 (1920–1924, 1948–2020)
- As host team: 1960^{*}

* Number of goalscorers (50+ goals): 2

- Number of goalscorers (40–49 goals): 2
- Number of goalscorers (30–39 goals): 4
- Last updated: 1 April 2021.

Legend and abbreviation

- – Hosts
- AUS – Australia
- ITA – Italy

Male players with 30 or more goals at the Olympics
Rk	Player	Birth	L/R	Total goals	Water polo tournaments (goals)					Age of first/last	ISHOF member	Note	Ref
Rk	Player	Birth	L/R	Total goals	1	2	3	4	5	Age of first/last	ISHOF member	Note	Ref
1	Gianni De Magistris	1950	Right	59	1968 (6)	1972 (11)	1976 (11)	1980 (20)	1984 (11)	17/33	1995		
2	Eraldo Pizzo	1938	Right	53	1960 (7)	1964 (5)	1968 (29)	1972 (12)		22/34			
3	Pietro Figlioli	1984	Right	47	2004; AUS (8)	2008; AUS (16)	2012; ITA (9)	2016; ITA (14)		20/32			
4	Alessandro Calcaterra	1975	Right	46	1996 (5)	2000 (9)	2004 (5)	2008 (27)		21/33			
5	Alberto Angelini	1974	Right	35	1996 (11)	2000 (4)	2004 (11)	2008 (9)		21/33			
6	Maurizio Felugo	1981	Right	34	2004 (6)	2008 (16)	2012 (12)			23/31			
7	Valentino Gallo	1985	Left	33	2008 (15)	2012 (10)	2016 (8)			23/31			
8	Leonardo Sottani	1973	Left	30	1996 (8)	2000 (11)		2008 (11)		22/34			
Rk	Player	Birth	L/R	Total goals	1	2	3	4	5	Age of first/last	ISHOF member	Note	Ref
Rk	Player	Birth	L/R	Total goals	Water polo tournaments (goals)					Age of first/last	ISHOF member	Note	Ref

Sources:

- Official Reports (PDF): 1920–1924, 1948–1996;
- Official Results Books (PDF): 2000 (pp. 47, 52, 55, 64, 68–69, 74, 76), 2004 (pp. 211–212), 2008 (pp. 205–206), 2012 (pp. 484–485), 2016 (pp. 123–124).

=== Japan ===
- Men's national team: Japan
- Team appearances: 9 (1932–1936, 1960–1972, 1984, 2016–2020)
- As host team: 1964, 2020^{*}

* Number of goalscorers (50+ goals): 0

- Number of goalscorers (40–49 goals): 0
- Number of goalscorers (30–39 goals): 0
- Last updated: 1 April 2021.

=== Kazakhstan ===
- Men's national team: Kazakhstan
- Team appearances: 4 (2000–2004, 2012, 2020)
- As host team: —
- Related teams: Soviet Union^{†}, Unified Team^{†}

* Number of goalscorers (50+ goals): 0

- Number of goalscorers (40–49 goals): 0
- Number of goalscorers (30–39 goals): 0
- Last updated: 1 April 2021.

=== Luxembourg ===
- Men's national team: Luxembourg
- Team appearances: 1 (1928)
- As host team: —
- Number of goalscorers (50+ goals): 0
- Number of goalscorers (40–49 goals): 0
- Number of goalscorers (30–39 goals): 0
- Last updated: 1 April 2021.

=== Malta ===
- Men's national team: Malta
- Team appearances: 2 (1928, 1936)
- As host team: —
- Number of goalscorers (50+ goals): 0
- Number of goalscorers (40–49 goals): 0
- Number of goalscorers (30–39 goals): 0
- Last updated: 1 April 2021.

=== Mexico ===
- Men's national team: Mexico
- Team appearances: 4 (1952, 1968^{*}–1976)
- As host team: 1968^{*}
- Number of goalscorers (50+ goals): 0
- Number of goalscorers (40–49 goals): 0
- Number of goalscorers (30–39 goals): 0
- Last updated: 1 April 2021.

Note:

- Armando Fernández is listed in section West Germany.

=== Montenegro ===
- Men's national team: Montenegro
- Team appearances: 4 (2008–2020)
- As host team: —
- Related teams: Yugoslavia^{†}, FR Yugoslavia^{†}, (Note: After the breakup of Yugoslavia, FR Yugoslavia men's national water polo team participated at the 1996 and 2000 Olympics, and won a bronze medal in 2000. In 2003, after the country was renamed from FR Yugoslavia to Serbia and Montenegro, the team was also renamed to "Serbia and Montenegro men's national water polo team".) Serbia and Montenegro^{†}

* Number of goalscorers (50+ goals): 0

- Number of goalscorers (40–49 goals): 0
- Number of goalscorers (30–39 goals): 2
- Last updated: 1 April 2021.

Male players with 30 or more goals at the Olympics
Rk	Player	Birth	L/R	Total goals	Water polo tournaments (goals)					Age of first/last	ISHOF member	Note	Ref
Rk	Player	Birth	L/R	Total goals	1	2	3	4	5	Age of first/last	ISHOF member	Note	Ref
1	Aleksandar Ivović	1986	Right	38	2008 (9)	2012 (19)	2016 (10)			22/30			
2	Mlađan Janović	1984	Right	31	2008 (13)	2012 (9)	2016 (9)			24/32			

- Official Results Books (PDF): 2008 (pp. 208–209), 2012 (pp. 489–490), 2016 (pp. 128–129).

=== Netherlands ===
- Men's national team: Netherlands
- Team appearances: 17 (1908, 1920–1928^{*}, 1936–1952, 1960–1984, 1992–2000)
- As host team: 1928^{*}

* Number of goalscorers (50+ goals): 0

- Number of goalscorers (40–49 goals): 2
- Number of goalscorers (30–39 goals): 1
- Last updated: 1 April 2021.

Male players with 30 or more goals at the Olympics
Rk	Player	Birth	L/R	Total goals	Water polo tournaments (goals)					Age of first/last	ISHOF member	Note	Ref
Rk	Player	Birth	L/R	Total goals	1	2	3	4	5	Age of first/last	ISHOF member	Note	Ref
1	Nico van der Voet	1944		43	1964 (10)	1968 (33)				20/24			
2	Harry van der Meer	1973	Right	40	1992 (8)	1996 (16)	2000 (16)			18/26			
3	Ruud van Feggelen	1924		32	1948 (16)	1952 (16)				24/28			

Sources:

- Official Reports (PDF): 1908, 1920–1928, 1936–1952, 1960–1984, 1992–1996;
- Official Results Books (PDF): 2000 (pp. 58, 60–61, 79, 83–84, 89, 91).

=== Portugal ===
- Men's national team: Portugal
- Team appearances: 1 (1952)
- As host team: —
- Number of goalscorers (50+ goals): 0
- Number of goalscorers (40–49 goals): 0
- Number of goalscorers (30–39 goals): 0
- Last updated: 1 April 2021.

=== Romania ===
- Men's national team: Romania
- Team appearances: 9 (1952–1964, 1972–1980, 1996, 2012)
- As host team: —

* Number of goalscorers (50+ goals): 0

- Number of goalscorers (40–49 goals): 0
- Number of goalscorers (30–39 goals): 0
- Last updated: 1 April 2021.

=== Russia ===
- Men's national team: Russia
- Team appearances: 3 (1996–2004)
- As host team: —
- Related teams: Soviet Union^{†}, Unified Team^{†}

* Number of goalscorers (50+ goals): 0

- Number of goalscorers (40–49 goals): 1
- Number of goalscorers (30–39 goals): 1
- Last updated: 1 April 2021.

Abbreviation

- EUN – Unified Team
- RUS – Russia
- URS – Soviet Union

Male players with 30 or more goals at the Olympics
Rk	Player	Birth	L/R	Total goals	Water polo tournaments (goals)					Age of first/last	ISHOF member	Note	Ref
Rk	Player	Birth	L/R	Total goals	1	2	3	4	5	Age of first/last	ISHOF member	Note	Ref
1	Dmitry Apanasenko	1967		40	1988; URS (14)	1992; EUN (20)	1996; RUS (6)			21/29			
2	Aleksandr Yeryshov	1973	Right	37	1996 (10)	2000 (17)	2004 (10)			23/31			

Sources:

- Official Reports (PDF): 1996;
- Official Results Books (PDF): 2000 (pp. 45, 49, 53, 63, 66, 69, 72, 75), 2004 (pp. 219–220).

=== Serbia ===
- Men's national team: Serbia
- Team appearances: 4 (2008–2020)
- As host team: —
- Related teams: Yugoslavia^{†}, FR Yugoslavia^{†}, Serbia and Montenegro^{†}

* Number of goalscorers (50+ goals): 1

- Number of goalscorers (40–49 goals): 1
- Number of goalscorers (30–39 goals): 2
- Last updated: 1 April 2021.

Abbreviation

- FRY – FR Yugoslavia
- SCG – Serbia and Montenegro
- SRB – Serbia

Male players with 30 or more goals at the Olympics
Rk	Player	Birth	L/R	Total goals	Water polo tournaments (goals)					Age of first/last	ISHOF member	Note	Ref
Rk	Player	Birth	L/R	Total goals	1	2	3	4	5	Age of first/last	ISHOF member	Note	Ref
1	Aleksandar Šapić	1978	Right	64	1996; FRY (8)	2000; FRY (18)	2004; SCG (18)	2008; SRB (20)		18/30			
2	Filip Filipović	1987	Left	41	2008 (4)	2012 (18)	2016 (19)			21/29			
3	Vladimir Vujasinović	1973	Right	34	1996; FRY (14)	2000; FRY (5)	2004; SCG (3)	2008; SRB (12)		22/35			
4	Andrija Prlainović	1987	Right	31	2008 (4)	2012 (22)	2016 (5)			21/29			

Sources:

- Official Reports (PDF): 1996;
- Official Results Books (PDF): 2000 (pp. 46, 50, 56, 78, 83, 85, 88, 92), 2004 (pp. 223–224), 2008 (pp. 211–212), 2012 (pp. 494–495), 2016 (pp. 131–132).

=== Serbia and Montenegro ===
- Men's national team: Serbia and Montenegro^{†}
- Team appearances: 1 (2004)
- As host team: —
- Related teams: Yugoslavia^{†}, FR Yugoslavia^{†}, Montenegro, Serbia
- Number of goalscorers (50+ goals): 0
- Number of goalscorers (40–49 goals): 0
- Number of goalscorers (30–39 goals): 0
- Last updated: 1 April 2021.

Notes:

- Aleksandar Šapić is listed in section Serbia.
- Vladimir Vujasinović is listed in section Serbia.

=== Singapore ===
- Men's national team: Singapore
- Team appearances: 1 (1956)
- As host team: —
- Number of goalscorers (50+ goals): 0
- Number of goalscorers (40–49 goals): 0
- Number of goalscorers (30–39 goals): 0
- Last updated: 1 April 2021.

=== Slovakia ===
- Men's national team: Slovakia
- Team appearances: 1 (2000)
- As host team: —
- Related team: Czechoslovakia^{†}
- Number of goalscorers (50+ goals): 0
- Number of goalscorers (40–49 goals): 0
- Number of goalscorers (30–39 goals): 0
- Last updated: 1 April 2021.

=== South Africa ===
- Men's national team: South Africa
- Team appearances: 3 (1952, 1960, 2020)
- As host team: —
- Number of goalscorers (50+ goals): 0
- Number of goalscorers (40–49 goals): 0
- Number of goalscorers (30–39 goals): 0
- Last updated: 1 April 2021.

=== South Korea ===
- Men's national team: South Korea
- Team appearances: 1 (1988^{*})
- As host team: 1988^{*}
- Number of goalscorers (50+ goals): 0
- Number of goalscorers (40–49 goals): 0
- Number of goalscorers (30–39 goals): 0
- Last updated: 1 April 2021.

=== Soviet Union ===
- Men's national team: Soviet Union^{†}
- Team appearances: 9 (1952–1980^{*}, 1988)
- As host team: 1980^{*}
- Related teams: Unified Team^{†}, Kazakhstan, Russia, Ukraine

* Number of goalscorers (50+ goals): 0

- Number of goalscorers (40–49 goals): 0
- Number of goalscorers (30–39 goals): 1
- Last updated: 1 April 2021.

Legend

- – Hosts

Male players with 30 or more goals at the Olympics
Rk	Player	Birth	L/R	Total goals	Water polo tournaments (goals)					Age of first/last	ISHOF member	Note	Ref
Rk	Player	Birth	L/R	Total goals	1	2	3	4	5	Age of first/last	ISHOF member	Note	Ref
1	Aleksei Barkalov	1946		38	1968 (14)	1972 (10)	1976 (6)	1980 (8)		22/34	1993		

- Official Reports (PDF): 1952–1980, 1988.

Note:

- Dmitry Apanasenko is listed in section Russia.

=== Spain ===
- Men's national team: Spain
- Team appearances: 18 (1920–1928, 1948–1952, 1968–1972, 1980–2020)
- As host team: 1992^{*}

* Number of goalscorers (50+ goals): 1

- Number of goalscorers (40–49 goals): 2
- Number of goalscorers (30–39 goals): 4
- Last updated: 1 April 2021.

Legend and abbreviation

- – Hosts
- BRA – Brazil
- CUB – Cuba
- ESP – Spain

Male players with 30 or more goals at the Olympics
Rk	Player	Birth	L/R	Total goals	Water polo tournaments (goals)						Age of first/last	ISHOF member	Note	Ref
Rk	Player	Birth	L/R	Total goals	1	2	3	4	5	6	Age of first/last	ISHOF member	Note	Ref
1	Manuel Estiarte	1961	Right	127	1980 (21)	1984 (34)	1988 (27)	1992 (22)	1996 (13)	2000 (10)	18/38	2007	Flag bearer for Spain (2000)	
2	Felipe Perrone	1986	Right	42	2008; ESP (16)	2012; ESP (16)	2016; BRA (10)				22/30			
3	Guillermo Molina	1984	Right	41	2004 (4)	2008 (13)	2012 (5)	2016 (19)			20/32			
4	Salvador Gómez	1968	Right	37	1988 (8)	1992 (5)	1996 (12)	2000 (5)	2004 (7)		20/36			
5	Pedro García	1968		35	1988 (9)	1992 (13)	1996 (7)	2000 (6)			19/31			
6	Jordi Sans	1965		33	1984 (0)	1988 (13)	1992 (8)	1996 (7)	2000 (5)		19/35			
7	Iván Pérez	1971	Left	31	1992; CUB (16)			2004; ESP (6)	2008; ESP (3)	2012; ESP (6)	21/41			
Rk	Player	Birth	L/R	Total goals	1	2	3	4	5	6	Age of first/last	ISHOF member	Note	Ref
Rk	Player	Birth	L/R	Total goals	Water polo tournaments (goals)						Age of first/last	ISHOF member	Note	Ref

Sources:

- Official Reports (PDF): 1920–1928, 1948–1952, 1968–1972, 1980–1996;
- Official Results Books (PDF): 2000 (pp. 46, 49, 54, 65, 67, 70, 74–75), 2004 (pp. 227–228), 2008 (pp. 193–194), 2012 (pp. 474–475), 2016 (pp. 112–113).

=== Sweden ===
- Men's national team: Sweden
- Team appearances: 8 (1908–1924, 1936–1952, 1980)
- As host team: 1912^{*}

* Number of goalscorers (50+ goals): 0

- Number of goalscorers (40–49 goals): 0
- Number of goalscorers (30–39 goals): 0
- Last updated: 1 April 2021.

=== Switzerland ===
- Men's national team: Switzerland
- Team appearances: 5 (1920–1928, 1936–1948)
- As host team: —
- Number of goalscorers (50+ goals): 0
- Number of goalscorers (40–49 goals): 0
- Number of goalscorers (30–39 goals): 0
- Last updated: 1 April 2021.

=== Ukraine ===
- Men's national team: Ukraine
- Team appearances: 1 (1996)
- As host team: —
- Related teams: Soviet Union^{†}, Unified Team^{†}
- Number of goalscorers (50+ goals): 0
- Number of goalscorers (40–49 goals): 0
- Number of goalscorers (30–39 goals): 0
- Last updated: 1 April 2021.

=== Unified Team ===
- Men's national team: (International Olympic Committee) Unified Team^{†}
- Team appearances: 1 (1992)
- As host team: —
- Related teams: Soviet Union^{†}, Kazakhstan, Russia, Ukraine
- Number of goalscorers (50+ goals): 0
- Number of goalscorers (40–49 goals): 0
- Number of goalscorers (30–39 goals): 0
- Last updated: 1 April 2021.

Note:

- Dmitry Apanasenko is listed in section Russia.

=== United States ===
- Men's national team: United States
- Team appearances: 22 (1920–1972, 1984^{*}–2020)
- As host team: 1932^{*}, 1984^{*}, 1996^{*}

* Number of goalscorers (50+ goals): 1

- Number of goalscorers (40–49 goals): 0
- Number of goalscorers (30–39 goals): 3
- Last updated: 1 April 2021.

Legend

- – Hosts

Male players with 30 or more goals at the Olympics
Rk	Player	Birth	L/R	Total goals	Water polo tournaments (goals)					Age of first/last	ISHOF member	Note	Ref
Rk	Player	Birth	L/R	Total goals	1	2	3	4	5	Age of first/last	ISHOF member	Note	Ref
1	Tony Azevedo	1981	Right	61	2000 (13)	2004 (15)	2008 (17)	2012 (11)	2016 (5)	18/34			
2	Chris Humbert	1969	Left	37	1992 (7)	1996 (14)	2000 (16)			22/30			
3	Bruce Bradley	1947	Right	35	1968 (18)	1972 (17)				21/25			
4	Wolf Wigo	1973	Right	31	1996 (8)	2000 (16)	2004 (7)			23/31			

Sources:

- Official Reports (PDF): 1920–1972, 1984–1996;
- Official Results Books (PDF): 2000 (pp. 47, 51, 53, 80, 82, 85, 89–90), 2004 (pp. 231–232), 2008 (pp. 214–215), 2012 (pp. 497–498), 2016 (pp. 133–134).

=== United Team of Germany ===
- Men's national team: United Team of Germany^{†}
- Team appearances: 3 (1956–1964)
- As host team: —
- Related teams: Germany, East Germany^{†}, West Germany^{†}
- Number of goalscorers (50+ goals): 0
- Number of goalscorers (40–49 goals): 0
- Number of goalscorers (30–39 goals): 0
- Last updated: 1 April 2021.

=== Uruguay ===
- Men's national team: Uruguay
- Team appearances: 2 (1936–1948)
- As host team: —
- Number of goalscorers (50+ goals): 0
- Number of goalscorers (40–49 goals): 0
- Number of goalscorers (30–39 goals): 0
- Last updated: 1 April 2021.

=== West Germany ===
- Men's national team: West Germany^{†}
- Team appearances: 5 (1968–1976, 1984–1988)
- As host team: 1972^{*}
- Related teams: Germany, United Team of Germany^{†}
- Number of goalscorers (50+ goals): 0
- Number of goalscorers (40–49 goals): 0
- Number of goalscorers (30–39 goals): 1
- Last updated: 1 April 2021.

Abbreviation

- FRG – West Germany
- MEX – Mexico

Male players with 30 or more goals at the Olympics
Rk	Player	Birth	L/R	Total goals	Water polo tournaments (goals)					Age of first/last	ISHOF member	Note	Ref
Rk	Player	Birth	L/R	Total goals	1	2	3	4	5	Age of first/last	ISHOF member	Note	Ref
1	Armando Fernández	1955		37	1972; MEX (11)	1976; MEX (16)		1984; FRG (6)	1988; FRG (4)	17/33			

- Official Reports (PDF): 1968–1976, 1984–1988.

Notes:

- Frank Otto is listed in section Germany.
- Hagen Stamm is listed in section Germany.

=== Yugoslavia ===
- Men's national team: Yugoslavia^{†}
- Team appearances: 12 (1936–1988)
- As host team: —
- Related teams: Croatia, FR Yugoslavia^{†}, Serbia and Montenegro^{†}, Montenegro, Serbia

* Number of goalscorers (50+ goals): 0

- Number of goalscorers (40–49 goals): 0
- Number of goalscorers (30–39 goals): 3
- Last updated: 1 April 2021.

Male players with 30 or more goals at the Olympics
Rk	Player	Birth	L/R	Total goals	Water polo tournaments (goals)					Age of first/last	ISHOF member	Note	Ref
Rk	Player	Birth	L/R	Total goals	1	2	3	4	5	Age of first/last	ISHOF member	Note	Ref
1	Zoran Janković	1940		34	1964 (6)	1968 (21)	1972 (7)			24/32	2004		
2	Mirko Sandić	1942	Right	31	1960 (3)	1964 (6)	1968 (17)	1972 (5)		18/30	1999	Flag bearer for Yugoslavia (1972)	
3	Uroš Marović	1946		30	1968 (10)	1972 (8)	1976 (12)			22/30			

- Official Reports (PDF): 1936–1988.

Note:

- Dubravko Šimenc is listed in section Croatia.

=== FR Yugoslavia ===
- Men's national team: Yugoslavia^{†}
- Team appearances: 2 (1996–2000)
- As host team: —
- Related teams: Yugoslavia^{†}, Serbia and Montenegro^{†}, Montenegro, Serbia
- Number of goalscorers (50+ goals): 0
- Number of goalscorers (40–49 goals): 0
- Number of goalscorers (30–39 goals): 0
- Last updated: 1 April 2021.

Notes:

- Aleksandar Šapić is listed in section Serbia.
- Vladimir Vujasinović is listed in section Serbia.

== See also ==
- Water polo at the Summer Olympics
- Lists of Olympic water polo records and statistics
  - List of men's Olympic water polo tournament records and statistics
  - List of women's Olympic water polo tournament records and statistics
  - List of Olympic champions in men's water polo
  - List of Olympic champions in women's water polo
  - National team appearances in the men's Olympic water polo tournament
  - National team appearances in the women's Olympic water polo tournament
  - List of players who have appeared in multiple men's Olympic water polo tournaments
  - List of players who have appeared in multiple women's Olympic water polo tournaments
  - List of Olympic medalists in water polo (men)
  - List of Olympic medalists in water polo (women)
  - List of women's Olympic water polo tournament top goalscorers
  - List of men's Olympic water polo tournament goalkeepers
  - List of women's Olympic water polo tournament goalkeepers
  - List of Olympic venues in water polo

== Sources ==
=== Official Reports (IOC) ===
PDF documents in the LA84 Foundation Digital Library:

- Official Report of the 1896 Olympic Games (download, archive)
- Official Report of the 1900 Olympic Games (download, archive)
- Official Report of the 1904 Olympic Games (download, archive)
- Official Report of the 1908 Olympic Games (download, archive) (pp. 359–361)
- Official Report of the 1912 Olympic Games (download, archive) (pp. 1021–1024, 1031–1037)
- Official Report of the 1920 Olympic Games (download, archive) (p. 130)
- Official Report of the 1924 Olympic Games (download, archive) (pp. 439–440, 486–494)
- Official Report of the 1928 Olympic Games (download, archive) (pp. 746–757, 797–807)
- Official Report of the 1932 Olympic Games (download, archive) (pp. 619–623, 646–652)
- Official Report of the 1936 Olympic Games, v.2 (download, archive) (pp. 345–356)
- Official Report of the 1948 Olympic Games (download, archive) (pp. 537–540, 640–647)
- Official Report of the 1952 Olympic Games (download, archive) (pp. 600–608)
- Official Report of the 1956 Olympic Games (download, archive) (pp. 592–594, 624–627)
- Official Report of the 1960 Olympic Games (download, archive) (pp. 552–555, 617–634)
- Official Report of the 1964 Olympic Games, v.2 (download, archive) (pp. 682–698)
- Official Report of the 1968 Olympic Games, v.3 (download, archive) (pp. 449–466, 811–826)
- Official Report of the 1972 Olympic Games, v.3 (download, archive) (pp. 331, 353–365)
- Official Report of the 1976 Olympic Games, v.3 (download, archive) (pp. 446–447, 484–497)
- Official Report of the 1980 Olympic Games, v.3 (download, archive) (pp. 458, 495–510)
- Official Report of the 1984 Olympic Games, v.2 (download, archive) (pp. 528–534)
- Official Report of the 1988 Olympic Games, v.2 (download, archive) (pp. 590–598)
- Official Report of the 1992 Olympic Games, v.5 (download, archive) (pp. 354, 386–400)
- Official Report of the 1996 Olympic Games, v.3 (download, archive) (pp. 56–73)

=== Official Results Books (IOC) ===
PDF documents in the LA84 Foundation Digital Library:

- Official Results Book – 2000 Olympic Games – Water Polo (download, archive)
- Official Results Book – 2004 Olympic Games – Water Polo (download, archive)
- Official Results Book – 2008 Olympic Games – Water Polo (download, archive)

PDF documents on the FINA website:

- Official Results Book – 2012 Olympic Games – Diving, Swimming, Synchronised Swimming, Water Polo (archive) (pp. 284–507)

PDF documents in the Olympic World Library:

- Official Results Book – 2016 Olympic Games – Water Polo (archive)

PDF documents on the International Olympic Committee website:

- Official Results Book – 2020 Olympic Games – Water Polo (archive)
- Official Results Book – 2024 Olympic Games – Water Polo

=== Official Reports (FINA) ===
PDF documents on the FINA website:

- HistoFINA – Water polo medalists and statistics (as of September 2019) (archive) (pp. 4–13)
- 1870–2020 | 150 years of Water Polo – Evolution of its rules (archive)

=== Official website (IOC) ===
Water polo on the International Olympic Committee website:

- Water polo
- Men's water polo

=== Olympedia ===
Water polo on the Olympedia website:

- Water polo Archived 2021-12-28 at the Wayback Machine
- Men's water polo
- Athlete count for water polo
- Water polo venues
- Water polo at the 1900 Summer Olympics (men's tournament)
- Water polo at the 1904 Summer Olympics (men's tournament)
- Water polo at the 1908 Summer Olympics (men's tournament)
- Water polo at the 1912 Summer Olympics (men's tournament)
- Water polo at the 1920 Summer Olympics (men's tournament)
- Water polo at the 1924 Summer Olympics (men's tournament)
- Water polo at the 1928 Summer Olympics (men's tournament)
- Water polo at the 1932 Summer Olympics (men's tournament)
- Water polo at the 1936 Summer Olympics (men's tournament)
- Water polo at the 1948 Summer Olympics (men's tournament)
- Water polo at the 1952 Summer Olympics (men's tournament)
- Water polo at the 1956 Summer Olympics (men's tournament)
- Water polo at the 1960 Summer Olympics (men's tournament)
- Water polo at the 1964 Summer Olympics (men's tournament)
- Water polo at the 1968 Summer Olympics (men's tournament)
- Water polo at the 1972 Summer Olympics (men's tournament)
- Water polo at the 1976 Summer Olympics (men's tournament)
- Water polo at the 1980 Summer Olympics (men's tournament)
- Water polo at the 1984 Summer Olympics (men's tournament)
- Water polo at the 1988 Summer Olympics (men's tournament)
- Water polo at the 1992 Summer Olympics (men's tournament)
- Water polo at the 1996 Summer Olympics (men's tournament)
- Water polo at the 2000 Summer Olympics (men's tournament)
- Water polo at the 2004 Summer Olympics (men's tournament)
- Water polo at the 2008 Summer Olympics (men's tournament)
- Water polo at the 2012 Summer Olympics (men's tournament)
- Water polo at the 2016 Summer Olympics (men's tournament)
- Water polo at the 2020 Summer Olympics (men's tournament)

=== Sports Reference ===
Water polo on the Sports Reference website:

- Country Medal Leaders & Athlete Medal Leaders (1900–2016) (archived)
- Men's water polo (1900–2016) (archived)
- Water polo at the 1900 Summer Games (men's tournament) (archived)
- Water polo at the 1904 Summer Games (men's tournament) (archived)
- Water polo at the 1908 Summer Games (men's tournament) (archived)
- Water polo at the 1912 Summer Games (men's tournament) (archived)
- Water polo at the 1920 Summer Games (men's tournament) (archived)
- Water polo at the 1924 Summer Games (men's tournament) (archived)
- Water polo at the 1928 Summer Games (men's tournament) (archived)
- Water polo at the 1932 Summer Games (men's tournament) (archived)
- Water polo at the 1936 Summer Games (men's tournament) (archived)
- Water polo at the 1948 Summer Games (men's tournament) (archived)
- Water polo at the 1952 Summer Games (men's tournament) (archived)
- Water polo at the 1956 Summer Games (men's tournament) (archived)
- Water polo at the 1960 Summer Games (men's tournament) (archived)
- Water polo at the 1964 Summer Games (men's tournament) (archived)
- Water polo at the 1968 Summer Games (men's tournament) (archived)
- Water polo at the 1972 Summer Games (men's tournament) (archived)
- Water polo at the 1976 Summer Games (men's tournament) (archived)
- Water polo at the 1980 Summer Games (men's tournament) (archived)
- Water polo at the 1984 Summer Games (men's tournament) (archived)
- Water polo at the 1988 Summer Games (men's tournament) (archived)
- Water polo at the 1992 Summer Games (men's tournament) (archived)
- Water polo at the 1996 Summer Games (men's tournament) (archived)
- Water polo at the 2000 Summer Games (men's tournament) (archived)
- Water polo at the 2004 Summer Games (men's tournament) (archived)
- Water polo at the 2008 Summer Games (men's tournament) (archived)
- Water polo at the 2012 Summer Games (men's tournament) (archived)
- Water polo at the 2016 Summer Games (men's tournament) (archived)
- Water polo at the 2020 Summer Games (men's tournament) (archived)

=== Todor66 ===
Water polo on the Todor66 website:

- Water polo at the Summer Games
- Water polo at the 1900 Summer Olympics (men's tournament)
- Water polo at the 1904 Summer Olympics (men's tournament)
- Water polo at the 1908 Summer Olympics (men's tournament)
- Water polo at the 1912 Summer Olympics (men's tournament)
- Water polo at the 1920 Summer Olympics (men's tournament)
- Water polo at the 1924 Summer Olympics (men's tournament)
- Water polo at the 1928 Summer Olympics (men's tournament)
- Water polo at the 1932 Summer Olympics (men's tournament)
- Water polo at the 1936 Summer Olympics (men's tournament)
- Water polo at the 1948 Summer Olympics (men's tournament)
- Water polo at the 1952 Summer Olympics (men's tournament)
- Water polo at the 1956 Summer Olympics (men's tournament)
- Water polo at the 1960 Summer Olympics (men's tournament)
- Water polo at the 1964 Summer Olympics (men's tournament)
- Water polo at the 1968 Summer Olympics (men's tournament, men's qualification)
- Water polo at the 1972 Summer Olympics (men's tournament, men's qualification)
- Water polo at the 1976 Summer Olympics (men's tournament, men's European qualification)
- Water polo at the 1980 Summer Olympics (men's tournament, men's European qualification, men's world qualification)
- Water polo at the 1984 Summer Olympics (men's tournament, men's qualification)
- Water polo at the 1988 Summer Olympics (men's tournament, men's qualification)
- Water polo at the 1992 Summer Olympics (men's tournament, men's qualification)
- Water polo at the 1996 Summer Olympics (men's tournament, men's qualification)
- Water polo at the 2000 Summer Olympics (men's tournament, men's qualification)
- Water polo at the 2004 Summer Olympics (men's tournament, men's qualification)
- Water polo at the 2008 Summer Olympics (men's tournament, men's qualification)
- Water polo at the 2012 Summer Olympics (men's tournament, men's qualification)
- Water polo at the 2016 Summer Olympics (men's tournament, men's qualification)
- Water polo at the 2020 Summer Olympics (men's tournament, men's qualification)
- Water polo at the 2024 Summer Olympics (men's tournament, men's qualification)

=== ISHOF ===
International Swimming Hall of Fame (ISHOF) website:

- Honorees Listed by Category – Water Polo
- Honorees Listed by Category – Coaches
- Honorees Listed by Category – Contributors
- Honorees by Country
- Honorees By Last Name
