= Stathakis =

Stathakis (or Stathaki, maiden name) is a Greek surname. It is the surname of:

- Giorgos Stathakis (born 1953) is a Greek politician and Economy minister.
- Sotirios Stathakis (born 1953) is a Greek olympic water polo player.
- Stavros Stathakis (born 1987) is a Greek association football player.
