= Eraldo Pizzo =

Italian water polo player

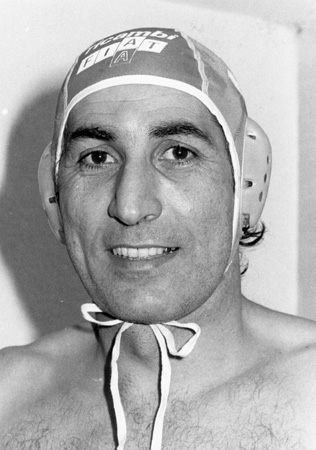

Personal information
- Nickname: il Caimano
- Born: 21 April 1938 (age 88) Rivarolo Ligure, Genoa, Italy
Medal record
Men's Water Polo
Representing Italy
Olympic Games
| Gold medal – first place | 1960 Rome | Team competition |

Eraldo Pizzo (born 21 April 1938) is an Italian water polo player who competed in the 1960 Summer Olympics, in the 1964 Summer Olympics, in the 1968 Summer Olympics, and in the 1972 Summer Olympics.

== Biography ==
He was born in Rivarolo Ligure, Genoa. In 1960, he was a member of the Italian water polo team which won the gold medal. He played six matches and scored seven goals.

Four years later he finished fourth with the Italian team in the water polo competition at the Tokyo Games. He played six matches and scored five goals.

At the 1968 Games he was part of the Italian team which finished again fourth in the Olympic water polo tournament. He played all nine matches and scored 29 goals.

His last Olympic appearance was at the Munich Games where he finished sixth with the Italian team in the 1972 water polo competition. He played all eight matches and scored 12 goals.

== Awards ==
On 7 May 2015, in the presence of the President of Italian National Olympic Committee (CONI), Giovanni Malagò, was inaugurated in the Olympic Park of the Foro Italico in Rome, along Viale delle Olimpiadi, the Walk of Fame of Italian sport, consisting of 100 tiles that chronologically report names of the most representative athletes in the history of Italian sport. On each tile are the name of the sportsman, the sport in which he distinguished himself and the symbol of CONI. One of these tiles is dedicated to Eraldo Pizzo.

== See also ==
- Italy men's Olympic water polo team records and statistics
- List of Olympic champions in men's water polo
- List of Olympic medalists in water polo (men)
- List of players who have appeared in multiple men's Olympic water polo tournaments
- List of men's Olympic water polo tournament top goalscorers
- List of members of the International Swimming Hall of Fame
- Legends of Italian sport - Walk of Fame
