= Geoffrey Clark (water polo) =

Australian water polo player (born 1969)

Personal information
- Born: February 8, 1969 (age 56)

Sport
- Sport: Water polo

Geoffrey Clark (born 8 February 1969) is an Australian water polo player who competed in the 1988 Summer Olympics and in the 1992 Summer Olympics.

Clark graduated from Pepperdine with a degree in sports medicine in 1993. He and his wife have three children and they reside in San Antonio, Texas.

== See also ==
- Australia men's Olympic water polo team records and statistics
- List of men's Olympic water polo tournament top goalscorers
