= János Németh (water polo) =

Hungarian water polo player

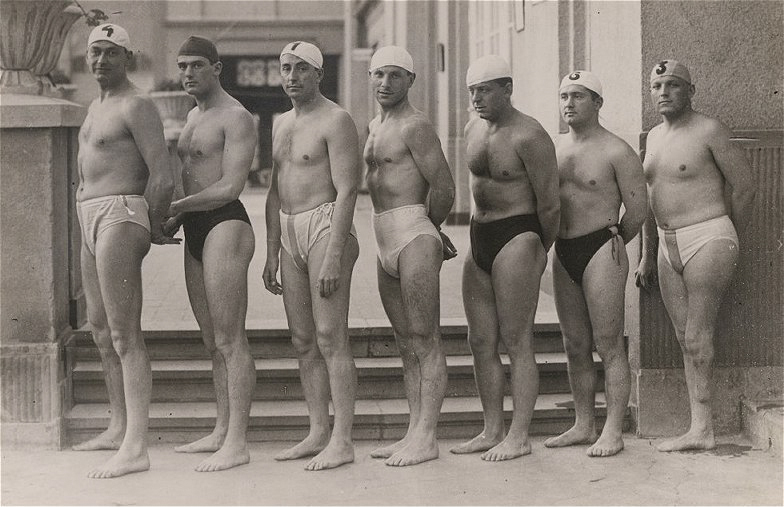

Personal information
- Born: June 12, 1906 Budapest, Hungary
- Died: March 5, 1988 (aged 81) Madrid, Spain

Sport
- Sport: Water polo
Medal record
Representing Hungary
Olympic Games
Gold medal – first place	1932 Los Angeles	Team competition
Gold medal – first place	1936 Berlin	Team competition

János Németh (June 12, 1906 – March 5, 1988) was a Hungarian water polo player who competed in the 1932 Summer Olympics and in the 1936 Summer Olympics.

In 1932 he was part of the Hungarian team which won the gold medal. He played all three matches. Four years later he won again the gold medal with the Hungarian team. At the Berlin Games he played all seven matches.

On club level he played for Újpesti TE.

== See also ==
- Hungary men's Olympic water polo team records and statistics
- List of Olympic champions in men's water polo
- List of Olympic medalists in water polo (men)
- List of men's Olympic water polo tournament top goalscorers
- List of members of the International Swimming Hall of Fame
