= Kyriakos Giannopoulos =

Greek water polo player (born 1959)

Personal information
- Born: April 17, 1959 (age 67)

Sport
- Sport: Water polo
Medal record
Representing Greece
Mediterranean Games
Bronze medal – third place	1991 Athens	Team competition
Bronze medal – third place	1993 Languedoc-Roussillon	Team competition

Kyriakos Giannopoulos (born 17 April 1959) is a Greek former water polo player who competed in the 1980, 1984, 1988, and in the 1992 Summer Olympics. He won 8 Greek Championships (4 with Glyfada, 4 with Olympiacos).

He is the current president of the Hellenic Aquatics Federation since spring 2021.

== See also ==
- Greece men's Olympic water polo team records and statistics
- List of players who have appeared in multiple men's Olympic water polo tournaments
- List of men's Olympic water polo tournament top goalscorers
