= Nico van der Voet =

Dutch water polo player (born 1944)

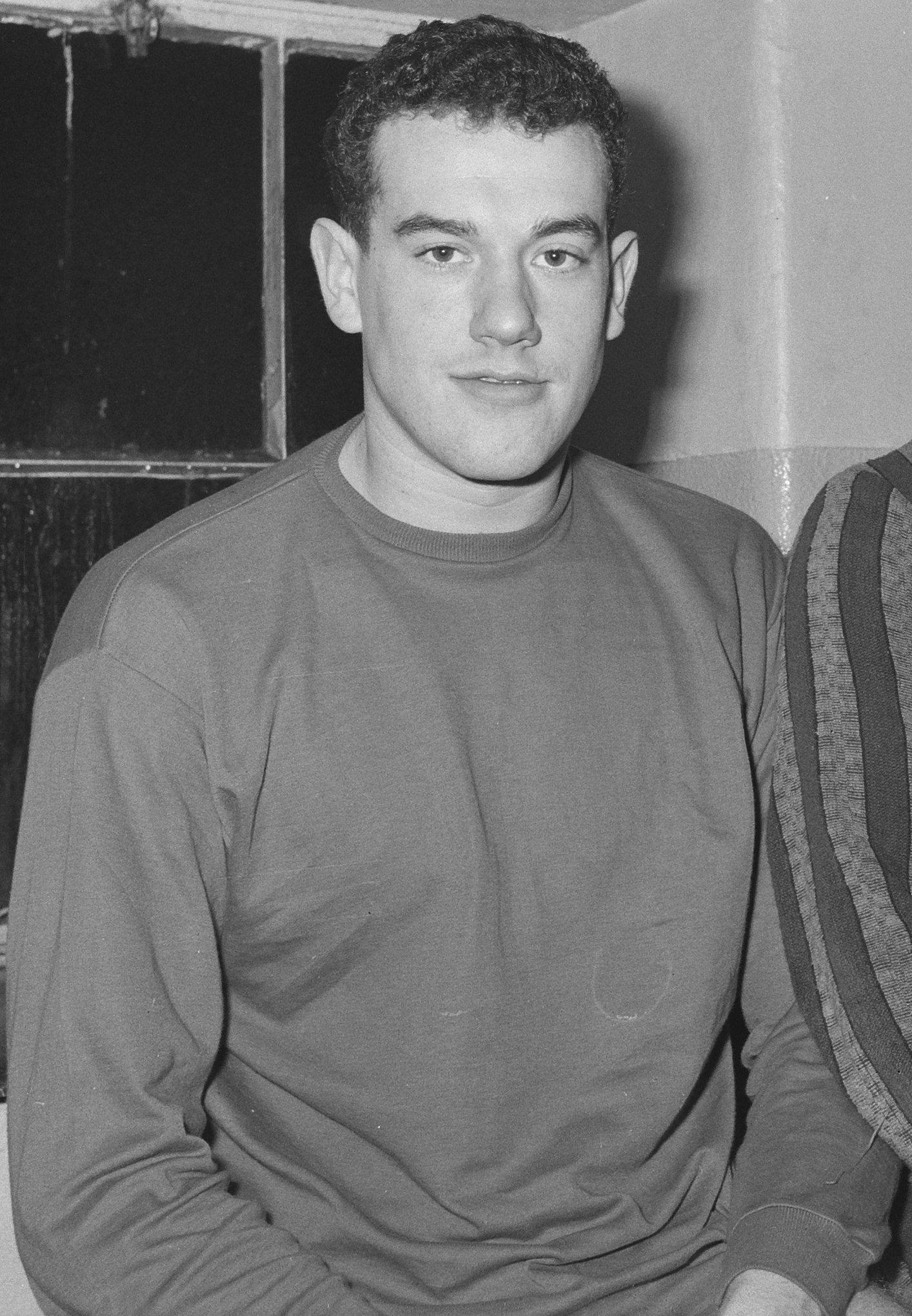
- van der Voet in 1964

Personal information
- Born: March 13, 1944 (age 81); Wassenaar, Netherlands

Sport
- Sport: Water polo

Nicolaas Marcus "Nico" van der Voet (born 13 March 1944) is a former water polo player from the Netherlands, who competed in two Summer Olympics for his native country. In 1964 he finished in eighth position with the Dutch Men's Team. Four years later in Mexico City he became seventh with the Holland squad.

== See also ==
- Netherlands men's Olympic water polo team records and statistics
- List of men's Olympic water polo tournament top goalscorers
