= Armando Fernández (water polo) =

Water polo player (born 1955)

Personal information
- Born: May 11, 1955 (age 71)

Sport
- Sport: Water polo
Medal record
Representing Mexico
Pan American Games
Gold medal – first place	1975 Mexico City	Team competition
Representing West Germany
Olympic Games
Bronze medal – third place	1984 Los Angeles	Team competition

Armando Fernández (born 11 May 1955) was a Mexican and later German former water polo player who competed in the 1972 Summer Olympics, in the 1976 Summer Olympics, in the 1984 Summer Olympics, and in the 1988 Summer Olympics.

== See also ==
- Germany men's Olympic water polo team records and statistics
- List of Olympic medalists in water polo (men)
- List of players who have appeared in multiple men's Olympic water polo tournaments
- List of men's Olympic water polo tournament top goalscorers
