= Dmitry Apanasenko =

Russian water polo player

Personal information
- Born: 17 July 1967 (age 58) Usolye-Sibirskoye, Soviet Union

Sport
- Sport: Water polo
Medal record
Representing the Soviet Union
Olympic Games
Bronze medal – third place	1988 Seoul	Team competition
World Championships
Bronze medal – third place	1986 Madrid	Team competition
European Championships
Gold medal – first place	1987 Strasbourg	Team competition
Bronze medal – third place	1991 Athens	Team competition
Representing the Unified Team
Olympic Games
Bronze medal – third place	1992 Barcelona	Team competition
Representing Russia
World Championships
Bronze medal – third place	1994 Rome	Team competition

Dmitry Borisovich Apanasenko (Russian: Дмитрий Борисович Апанасенко, born 17 July 1967) is a Russian former water polo player who competed in the 1988 Summer Olympics, and in the 1992 Summer Olympics.

== See also ==
- Russia men's Olympic water polo team records and statistics
- List of Olympic medalists in water polo (men)
- List of men's Olympic water polo tournament top goalscorers
- List of World Aquatics Championships medalists in water polo
