= Pierre Garsau =

French water polo player (1961–1997)

Personal information
- Nationality: Algeria; France
- Born: 7 November 1961 Oran, Algeria
- Died: 9 May 1997 (aged 35)
- Height: 1.86 m (6 ft 1 in)
- Weight: 90 kg (200 lb)

Sport
- Sport: Water polo

Senior clubs
- Years: Team
- –: CN Marseille
National team
- Years: Team
- ?-?: France

Pierre Garsau (7 November 1961 – 9 May 1997) was an Algerian born French male water polo player. He was a member of the France men's national water polo team. He competed with the team at the 1988 Summer Olympics and 1992 Summer Olympics.

== See also ==
- France men's Olympic water polo team records and statistics
- List of men's Olympic water polo tournament top goalscorers
