= Hans Schneider (water polo) =

German water polo player

Personal information
- Born: October 21, 1909 Duisburg, German Empire
- Died: July 19, 1972 (aged 62) Duisburg, West Germany

Sport
- Sport: Water polo
Medal record
Men's Water Polo
Representing Germany
Olympic Games
Silver medal – second place	1936 Berlin	Team competition
European Championships
Silver medal – second place	1938 London	Team

Hans Joachim Schneider (21 October 1909 – 19 July 1972) was a German water polo player who competed in the 1936 Summer Olympics.

He was part of the German team which won the silver medal. He played six matches including the final.

== See also ==
- List of Olympic medalists in water polo (men)
