= Sotirios Stathakis =

Greek water polo player

Personal information
- Born: April 15, 1953 (age 71)

Sport
- Sport: Water polo

Sotirios Stathakis (born 15 April 1953) is a former Greek water polo player who competed in the 1980 Summer Olympics and in the 1984 Summer Olympics.

== See also ==
- Greece men's Olympic water polo team records and statistics
- List of men's Olympic water polo tournament top goalscorers
