= Rivarolo Ligure =

Neighborhood in Genoa, Italy

Coordinates: 44°26′41″N 8°53′35″E

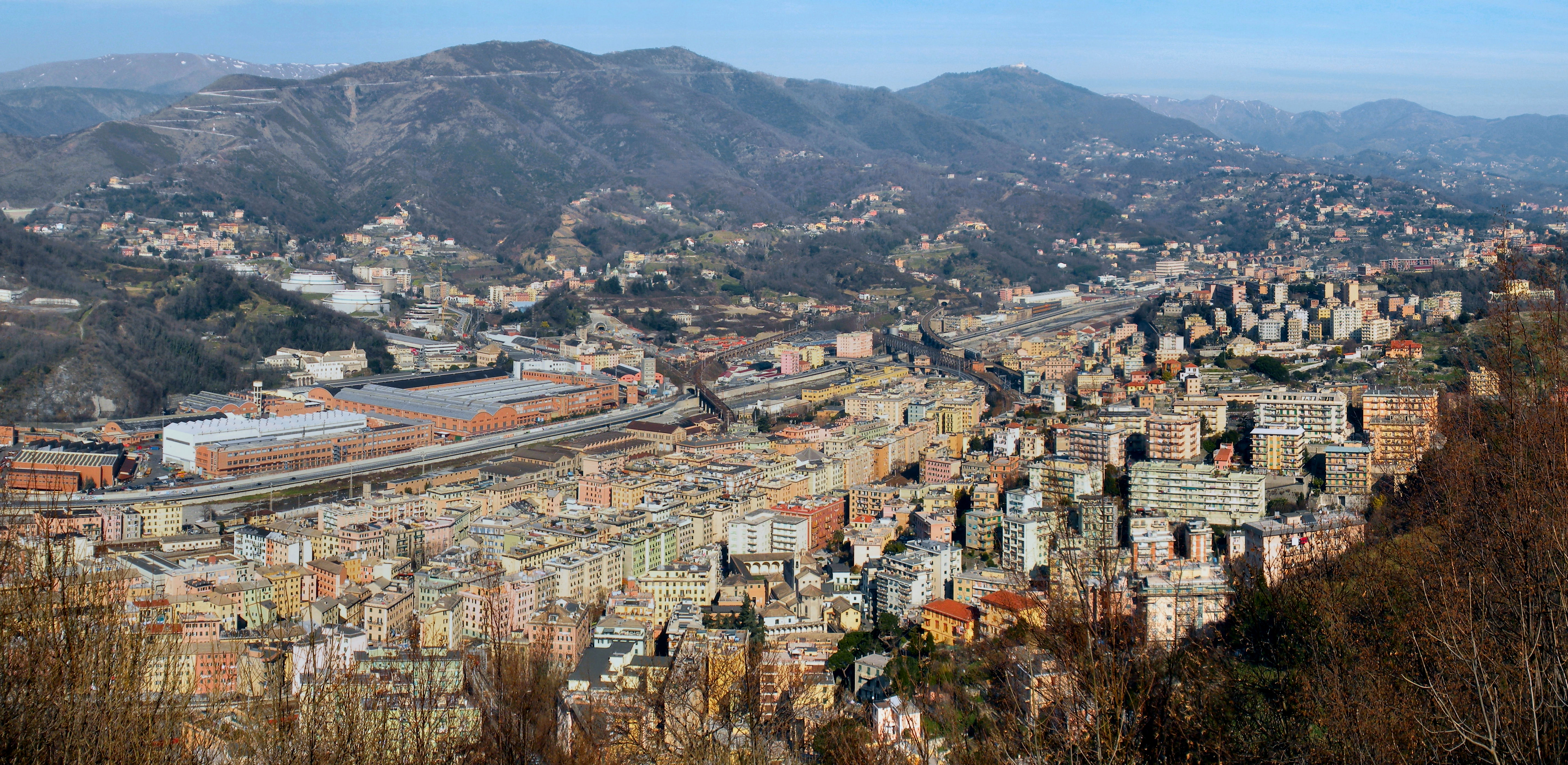
Panorama

Rivarolo Ligure is a quarter in the north side of the city of Genoa, and is part of the Municipality Valpolcevera of Genoa.

== Description ==
An important Genoese railway hub, it was an autonomous municipality until 1926, when, together with eighteen other municipalities, it was incorporated into the municipality of Genoa to form the so-called Grande Genova.

=== Toponym ===
There are several hypotheses about the toponym "Rivarolo", which some have traced back to the position of the village on the bank of the Polcevera stream. This thesis contrasts with the fact that the oldest inhabited area, like most of the towns of Valpolcevera, rose further upstream, sheltered from the torrent's floods. Probably the origin of the name is to be found in the term "Roieu" which in the ancient dialect meant "rovereto" (oak wood). Called Riparolium in the Annals of Giustiniani of 1535, it was later divided into Rivarolo Soprano (the area around the church of S. Maria Assunta and that of the Costa, to the right of the Torbella stream) and Rivarolo Sottano (Certosa and Borghetto, to the left of Torbella ).

== Territory ==
The territory of the district of Rivarolo extends on both banks of the Polcevera, in the lower part of the valley, and includes the valleys of some of its tributaries, the main one being the Torbella stream. Other minor streams are the Rio Maltempo, in the area called "Bersaglio" and, on the right side, the Pianego and the Trasta.

The main centers (Rivarolo, Certosa and Teglia) are located on the left of the stream, aligned along the former Strada Statale 35 dei Giovi. The Genoa-Turin railway line runs along the embankment that divides the towns from the stream, built around the mid-nineteenth century.

On the hill on the left side there are the ancient villages of Begato, Garbo and Fregoso and the modern neighborhood of popular housing called "Valtorbella" (commonly called CIGE). On the right side of the valley are the hamlets of Fegino and Trasta, which until 1926 belonged to the suppressed municipality of Borzoli and which together form the urban unit "Borzoli Est".

== History ==
=== From the origins to the eighteenth century ===
The first news of the village of Rivarolo dates back to a 12th-century document, in which reference is made to land near the church of Santa Maria della Costa, whose existence is documented since 1012. At that time around the church and along the road that from Begato descended to the fords of the stream in the direction of Fegino and the Genoese west, the village of Costa, also known as Rivarolo Soprano, was formed.

In the Middle Ages the Fieschis, lords of the area, had a palace built there and, on the Pigna hill, a castle, which was destroyed during the clashes that took place in 1325 between Guelphs and Ghibellines. In memory of that fort, whose few ruins were visible until a few decades ago, the hill is also called Castelluccio, a toponym that remained on the road that climbs to its summit (the toponym Pigna instead referred to a centuries-old pine that stood on the hill, also depicted in the coat of arms of the town of Rivarolo and which was knocked down by a violent storm on 5 March 1926). [4]

Along the direct road to Begato, on the hill above the church, in 1612, in a land purchased by the Spinola family, the Franciscan friars would have built the convent of N.S. della Misericordia, with a hospitable annex, which later became the seat of the Celesia Hospital in 1862, still partially operating today. The subsequent renovation and expansion works of the hospital no longer allow us to recognize the original structure of the building, with the exception of the adjoining chapel.

In the meantime, towards the end of the thirteenth century, the Carthusian monks had settled with another grandiose monastery in Rivarolo Sottano, a place that would later take the name of Certosa from them.

... however descending towards the sea, and, leaving the river from the west, we enter the parish church of Riparolo, which first contains: the village, named Riparolo soprano, with fifty houses; it contains the village, named Riparolo sottano, with fifty, and a territory, named the coast of Riparolo, with thirty-eight, celebrated for the goodness of the wines. ... and the villa of Beghè with the territory of Fregoso: in Beghè there are forty fires of villagers and a house of citizens; and in Fregoso there are five or six houses of the Fregosi lords. And it is in this territory the Cartusiensi monastery of beautiful construction and with beautiful possessions. There is also the villa del Garbo, with sixteen houses of citizens, and four of villagers.

— Agostino Giustiniani, "Annals of the Republic of Genoa", Annals of the Republic of Genoa (1537)

Due to its position, the village was several times at the center of military events [5], but the most negative events are those which occurred during the war of 1746–1747, with the occupation of the surroundings of Genoa by the Austrian troops. In the first months of 1747 the Austrians, expelled from Genoa in December 1746 following the revolt that began with the legendary episode of the Balilla, occupied the surroundings from where they laid siege to the city in an attempt to recapture it. In those months many citizens lost their lives, due to war clashes and deprivations suffered, many houses and churches were destroyed or seriously damaged, including the church of Santa Caterina di Begato and the convent of N.S. of Mercy.

The development of the area coincided with the opening, in 1772, of the first road at the bottom of the valley from Sampierdarena, commissioned by Doge G.B. Cambiaso. The historical nucleus of that period, still easily recognizable, despite the impetuous building development of the twentieth century, consists of the village, crossed by the current Via Celesia, located between the left bank of the Polcevera stream (whose bed, before the construction of the embankment in the mid-nineteenth century, it was much wider than the current one) and the overlying hill, with the church of the Assumption and the convent of NS of Mercy.

Some noble settlements date back to the eighteenth century, such as Villa Pallavicini, in the center of Rivarolo and that of the Lomellini family, known as "Villa Buena", since 1879 the seat of a private school, still active today.

=== The nineteenth century ===
In 1800 the descent of the Napoleonic troops put an end to the centuries-old history of the Republic of Genoa. With the French dominion and the new administrative subdivisions, at the beginning of the nineteenth century Rivarolo became an autonomous municipality, which originally also included the fraction of Murta, which passed to the municipality of Bolzaneto in 1869.

In 1814, following the decisions of the Congress of Vienna, the former Napoleonic Ligurian Republic, and therefore also the municipality of Rivarolo, passed to the Kingdom of Sardinia. This is how Casalis described the town of Rivarolo Ligure in 1834:

Rivaloro, district capital in the prov. dioc. and div. of Genoa. It is on the royal road, on the mistral from Genoa, from which it is three miles away. Rivarolo, a large and pleasant village, is divided into lower and upper. It is made up of five parishes, namely those of Rivarolo, Certosa, Murta, Begato, Geminiano. The districts of Costa, Teglia and Garbo are aggregated to the first. In the lower Rivarolo is the Certosa; in the upper part there is the parish church, a church and a convent of Discalced Franciscans, which convent stands in a very pleasant site. Rivarolo as head of district has subjects the municipalities of s. Pier d’Arena, of Brazil and of s. Olcese. Between the lower and upper Rivarolo the Turbella stream passes, which descends from the mountain of the due Fratelli; it helps to fertilize the countryside of this district capital; which, if it does not produce a large quantity of cereals, provides many good fruits, and so much hay that it can keep many cattle, horses, mules, donkeys, and even sheep and goats, of which the products are remarkable.

— Goffredo Casalis, "Geographical, historical, statistical and commercial dictionary of the states of S.M. the King of Sardinia", Geographical, historical, statistical and commercial dictionary of the states of S.M. the King of Sardinia (1834)

Towards the middle of the nineteenth century, with the embankment of the river and the construction of the railway, the industrial development of Valpolcevera began, which also led to a great demographic, urban and road development. The urban growth, which has become impetuous especially since the end of the nineteenth century, has significantly modified the topography of the town, with the construction of numerous residential houses, industrial settlements and road and railway infrastructures in previously agricultural areas, with the total urbanization of the area between the ancient nucleus of Rivarolo and the hamlet of Certosa.

In 1859 the railway station was inaugurated, in 1862 on the premises of the suppressed convent of N.S. della Misericordia, the Celesia hospital, the first modern health facility in Valpolcevera, came into operation. In 1881, the horse-drawn tram line entered service, then electrified in 1905.

The increase in population and industrial development made the old eighteenth-century road system insufficient, so new wider roads were opened, also partly using the land that before the construction of the embankment was part of the bed of the Polcevera stream.

Between the end of the nineteenth century and the beginning of the twentieth century, the consortium road along the embankment and the bridge over the Polcevera were built, which connected Rivarolo with Fegino and Borzoli, a premise for the urban development of the areas on the right bank of the stream, at the time still under the jurisdiction of the municipality of Borzoli.

=== The twentieth century ===
With the Royal Decree n. 74 of January 14, 1926, the Municipality of Genoa expanded by incorporating 19 municipalities of Val Polcevera, Val Bisagno and the two rivieras, in the Levante and in the Ponente . The town of Rivarolo Ligure thus became part of the so-called Great Genoa.

The 1920s saw the urban and residential development towards the hill of Misericordia, favored by the opening, in 1923, of the carriage road to the Celesia hospital (via P. Negrotto Cambiaso).

The building called Diga, in the Diamante district, on the border between Rivarolo and Bolzaneto The improvement of the road connection on the main road at the bottom of the valley involved, in the 1930s, the demolition of the old houses that formed the Borghetto district, between Certosa and Rivarolo, at the bridge over the Torbella stream, a tributary of the Polcevera.

The building expansion in the hilly areas continued even after World War II: in the seventies the social housing districts called Valtorbella and Diamante were built, in the journalistic and current language called respectively CIGE and Begato. The latter toponym more properly corresponds to the ancient village located further upstream of these new settlements.
