= Water polo at the 2011 World Aquatics Championships – Men's team rosters =

These are the rosters of all participating teams at the men's water polo tournament at the 2011 World Aquatics Championships held between July 17–30 at the Shanghai Oriental Sports Center in Shanghai, China.

== Australia ==
No.	Name	Date of birth	L/R	Position	Height	Weight
1	Joel Dennerley	25 June 1987	R	GK	1.94 m (6 ft 4 in)	93 kg (205 lb)
2	Richard Campbell	18 September 1987	R	FP	1.93 m (6 ft 4 in)	99 kg (218 lb)
3	Timothy Cleland	15 December 1984	R	FP	1.95 m (6 ft 5 in)	115 kg (254 lb)
4	Mitchell Baird	1 May 1985	R	FP	1.99 m (6 ft 6 in)	120 kg (260 lb)
5	Robert Maitland	4 September 1983	R	FP	1.88 m (6 ft 2 in)	98 kg (216 lb)
6	Anthony Martin	22 March 1985	R	FP	1.93 m (6 ft 4 in)	95 kg (209 lb)
7	Aidan Joseph Roach	7 September 1990	R	FP	1.86 m (6 ft 1 in)	88 kg (194 lb)
8	Samuel Mcgregor	12 August 1984	R	FP	1.92 m (6 ft 4 in)	105 kg (231 lb)
9	Aaron Younger	25 September 1991	R	FP	1.85 m (6 ft 1 in)	92 kg (203 lb)
10	Gavin Woods	1 March 1978	R	FP	2.00 m (6 ft 7 in)	95 kg (209 lb)
11	Rhys Howden	2 April 1987	R	FP	1.88 m (6 ft 2 in)	80 kg (180 lb)
12	William Miller	21 February 1988	R	FP	1.88 m (6 ft 2 in)	90 kg (200 lb)
13	Luke Quinliven	20 August 1985	L	GK	1.92 m (6 ft 4 in)	100 kg (220 lb)

== Brazil ==
No.	Name	Date of birth	L/R	Position	Height	Weight
1	Marcelo Chagas	6 February 1980	R	GK	1.84 m (6 ft 0 in)	84 kg (185 lb)
2	Emilio Vieira	23 July 1987	R	FP	1.88 m (6 ft 2 in)	95 kg (209 lb)
3	Henrique Miranda	10 July 1986	R	FP	1.83 m (6 ft 0 in)	87 kg (192 lb)
4	Bernardo Gomes	12 November 1993	R	FP	1.86 m (6 ft 1 in)	90 kg (200 lb)
5	Marcelo Franco	15 May 1984	L	FP	1.82 m (6 ft 0 in)	83 kg (183 lb)
6	Gustavo Guimaraes	24 January 1994	R	FP	1.80 m (5 ft 11 in)	83 kg (183 lb)
7	Jonas Crivella	30 April 1988	R	FP	1.80 m (5 ft 11 in)	79 kg (174 lb)
8	Felipe Silva	8 August 1984	L	FP	1.98 m (6 ft 6 in)	102 kg (225 lb)
9	Bernardo Rocha	3 July 1989	R	FP	1.81 m (5 ft 11 in)	85 kg (187 lb)
11	Joao Felipe Coelho	18 November 1988	R	FP	1.73 m (5 ft 8 in)	78 kg (172 lb)
12	Danilo Correa	2 September 1988	R	FP	1.94 m (6 ft 4 in)	102 kg (225 lb)
13	Vinicius Antonelli	1 March 1990	R	GK	1.80 m (5 ft 11 in)	82 kg (181 lb)

== Canada ==
No.	Name	Date of birth	L/R	Position	Height	Weight
1	Robin Randall	1 May 1980	R	GK	1.97 m (6 ft 6 in)	93 kg (205 lb)
2	Constantine Kudaba	17 May 1987	R	FP	1.96 m (6 ft 5 in)	87 kg (192 lb)
3	Omar Touni	25 October 1991	R	FP	1.85 m (6 ft 1 in)	87 kg (192 lb)
4	Nicolas Constantin Bicari	5 December 1991	R	FP	1.97 m (6 ft 6 in)	98 kg (216 lb)
5	Justin Boyd	23 April 1989	L	FP	1.96 m (6 ft 5 in)	94 kg (207 lb)
6	Scott Robinson	8 May 1991	R	FP	1.92 m (6 ft 4 in)	84 kg (185 lb)
7	John Conway	8 July 1991	R	FP	1.85 m (6 ft 1 in)	85 kg (187 lb)
8	Kevin Graham	21 April 1986	L	FP	2.00 m (6 ft 7 in)	96 kg (212 lb)
9	Devon Diggle		R	FP		
10	Dusko Dakic	20 April 1989	R	FP	1.87 m (6 ft 2 in)	86 kg (190 lb)
11	Oliver Vikalo	14 October 1991	R	FP	1.92 m (6 ft 4 in)	89 kg (196 lb)
12	Jared Mcelroy	5 April 1991	R	FP	1.81 m (5 ft 11 in)	88 kg (194 lb)
13	Dusan Aleksic	7 April 1991	R	GK	1.94 m (6 ft 4 in)	91 kg (201 lb)

== China ==
No.	Name	Date of birth	L/R	Position	Height	Weight
1	Ge Weiqing	25 April 1977	R	GK	1.84 m (6 ft 0 in)	89 kg (196 lb)
2	Tan Feihu	1 January 1987	R	FP	1.90 m (6 ft 3 in)	103 kg (227 lb)
3	Liang Zhongxing	23 December 1986	R	FP	1.98 m (6 ft 6 in)	97 kg (214 lb)
4	Yu Lijun	28 November 1978	R	FP	1.96 m (6 ft 5 in)	108 kg (238 lb)
5	Guo Junliang	1 December 1984	R	FP	1.95 m (6 ft 5 in)	95 kg (209 lb)
6	Pan Ning	11 March 1987	R	FP	1.85 m (6 ft 1 in)	90 kg (200 lb)
7	Li Bin	24 October 1983	R	FP	1.84 m (6 ft 0 in)	96 kg (212 lb)
8	Wang Yang	17 January 1983	L	FP	1.85 m (6 ft 1 in)	77 kg (170 lb)
9	Xie Junmin	17 May 1983	R	FP	1.86 m (6 ft 1 in)	86 kg (190 lb)
10	Li Li	28 February 1988	R	FP	1.86 m (6 ft 1 in)	94 kg (207 lb)
11	Zhang Chufeng	7 September 1989	R	FP	1.90 m (6 ft 3 in)	85 kg (187 lb)
12	Dong Tianyi	8 November 1987	R	FP	1.93 m (6 ft 4 in)	103 kg (227 lb)
13	Wu Honghui	10 April 1990	R	GK	1.96 m (6 ft 5 in)	88 kg (194 lb)

== Croatia ==
No.	Name	Date of birth	L/R	Position	Height	Weight
1	Josip Pavic	15 January 1982	R	GK	1.96 m (6 ft 5 in)	88 kg (194 lb)
2	Damir Buric	2 December 1980	R	FP	2.05 m (6 ft 9 in)	113 kg (249 lb)
3	Miho Boskovic	11 January 1983	R	FP	1.97 m (6 ft 6 in)	101 kg (223 lb)
4	Niksa Dobud	5 August 1985	R	FP	1.98 m (6 ft 6 in)	115 kg (254 lb)
5	Maro Jokovic	1 October 1987	L	FP	2.03 m (6 ft 8 in)	97 kg (214 lb)
6	Petar Muslim	26 March 1988	L	FP	1.96 m (6 ft 5 in)	101 kg (223 lb)
7	Frano Karac	4 June 1977	R	FP	1.92 m (6 ft 4 in)	93 kg (205 lb)
8	Andro Buslje	4 January 1986	R	FP	2.00 m (6 ft 7 in)	108 kg (238 lb)
9	Sandro Sukno	30 June 1990	R	FP	2.00 m (6 ft 7 in)	85 kg (187 lb)
10	Samir Barac	2 November 1973	R	FP	1.87 m (6 ft 2 in)	95 kg (209 lb)
11	Fran Paskvalin	22 November 1984	R	FP	2.05 m (6 ft 9 in)	110 kg (240 lb)
12	Paulo Obradovic	9 March 1986	R	FP	1.92 m (6 ft 4 in)	99 kg (218 lb)
13	Ivan Buljubasic	31 October 1987	R	FP	1.95 m (6 ft 5 in)	99 kg (218 lb)

== Germany ==
No.	Name	Date of birth	L/R	Position	Height	Weight
1	Alexander Tchigir	6 November 1968	R	GK	1.90 m (6 ft 3 in)	82 kg (181 lb)
2	Florian Naroska	16 April 1982	R	FP	1.98 m (6 ft 6 in)	100 kg (220 lb)
3	Fabian Schroedter	11 September 1982	R	FP	2.06 m (6 ft 9 in)	107 kg (236 lb)
4	Julian Real	22 December 1989	R	FP	1.98 m (6 ft 6 in)	108 kg (238 lb)
5	Marko Yannik Stamm	30 August 1988	R	FP	1.86 m (6 ft 1 in)	100 kg (220 lb)
6	Marc Torsten Politze	20 October 1977	R	FP	1.96 m (6 ft 5 in)	100 kg (220 lb)
7	Erik Marcin Bukowski	18 November 1986	R	FP	1.86 m (6 ft 1 in)	85 kg (187 lb)
8	Paul Schueler	14 June 1987	R	FP	1.84 m (6 ft 0 in)	101 kg (223 lb)
9	Tobias Kreuzmann	15 June 1981	R	FP	1.95 m (6 ft 5 in)	90 kg (200 lb)
10	Moritz Benedikt Oeler	21 October 1985	R	FP	1.88 m (6 ft 2 in)	84 kg (185 lb)
11	Andreas Schlotterbeck	2 March 1982	R	FP	1.90 m (6 ft 3 in)	180 kg (400 lb)
12	Dennis Eidner	4 August 1989	R	FP	1.80 m (5 ft 11 in)	106 kg (234 lb)
13	Roger Kong	22 September 1984	R	GK	1.85 m (6 ft 1 in)	84 kg (185 lb)

== Hungary ==
No.	Name	Date of birth	L/R	Position	Height	Weight
1	Viktor Nagy	24 July 1984	R	GK	1.98 m (6 ft 6 in)	98 kg (216 lb)
2	Miklós Ferenc Gór Nagy	8 January 1983	R	FP	1.94 m (6 ft 4 in)	103 kg (227 lb)
3	Norbert Madaras	1 December 1979	L	FP	1.91 m (6 ft 3 in)	91 kg (201 lb)
4	Dénes Andor Varga	29 March 1987	R	FP	1.93 m (6 ft 4 in)	95 kg (209 lb)
5	István Márton Szivós	19 August 1981	R	FP	1.92 m (6 ft 4 in)	92 kg (203 lb)
6	Norbert Hosnyánszky	4 March 1984	R	FP	1.96 m (6 ft 5 in)	102 kg (225 lb)
7	Gergely Kiss	21 September 1977	L	FP	1.98 m (6 ft 6 in)	112 kg (247 lb)
8	Zsolt Varga	24 May 1978	R	FP	1.97 m (6 ft 6 in)	104 kg (229 lb)
9	Dániel Rudolf Varga	25 September 1983	R	FP	2.01 m (6 ft 7 in)	95 kg (209 lb)
10	Péter Biros	5 April 1976	R	FP	1.96 m (6 ft 5 in)	102 kg (225 lb)
11	Ádám Steinmetz	11 August 1980	R	FP	1.98 m (6 ft 6 in)	104 kg (229 lb)
12	Balázs Hárai	5 April 1987	R	FP	2.02 m (6 ft 8 in)	110 kg (240 lb)
13	Zoltán Szécsi	22 December 1977	R	GK	1.98 m (6 ft 6 in)	98 kg (216 lb)

== Italy ==
No.	Name	Date of birth	L/R	Position	Height	Weight
1	Stefano Tempesti	9 June 1979	R	GK	2.05 m (6 ft 9 in)	99 kg (218 lb)
2	Amaurys Perez	18 March 1976	R	FP	1.94 m (6 ft 4 in)	80 kg (180 lb)
3	Niccolo Gitto	12 October 1986	L	FP	1.85 m (6 ft 1 in)	82 kg (181 lb)
4	Pietro Figlioli	29 May 1984	R	FP	1.92 m (6 ft 4 in)	98 kg (216 lb)
5	Alex Giorgetti	24 December 1987	R	FP	1.85 m (6 ft 1 in)	83 kg (183 lb)
6	Maurizio Felugo	15 April 1981	R	FP	1.89 m (6 ft 2 in)	86 kg (190 lb)
7	Niccolo Figari	24 January 1980	R	FP	1.97 m (6 ft 6 in)	95 kg (209 lb)
8	Valentino Gallo	17 July 1985	L	FP	1.93 m (6 ft 4 in)	93 kg (205 lb)
9	Christian Presciutti	27 November 1982	R	FP	1.85 m (6 ft 1 in)	85 kg (187 lb)
10	Deni Fiorentini					
11	Matteo Aicardi	4 April 1986	R	FP	1.92 m (6 ft 4 in)	104 kg (229 lb)
12	Arnaldo Deserti	18 April 1979	R	FP	1.89 m (6 ft 2 in)	100 kg (220 lb)
13	Giacomo Pastorino	7 June 1980	R	GK	1.91 m (6 ft 3 in)	89 kg (196 lb)

== Japan ==
No.	Name	Date of birth	L/R	Position	Height	Weight
1	Katsuyuki Tanamura	3 August 1989	R	GK	1.83 m (6 ft 0 in)	83 kg (183 lb)
2	Kan Aoyagi	19 August 1980	R	FP	1.84 m (6 ft 0 in)	92 kg (203 lb)
3	Koji Takei	30 July 1990	R	FP	1.77 m (5 ft 10 in)	77 kg (170 lb)
4	Shota Hazui	30 September 1986	R	FP	1.78 m (5 ft 10 in)	81 kg (179 lb)
5	Mitsuaki Shiga	16 September 1991	R	FP	1.78 m (5 ft 10 in)	83 kg (183 lb)
6	Akira Yanase	11 August 1988	R	FP	1.90 m (6 ft 3 in)	95 kg (209 lb)
7	Yusuke Shimizu	7 September 1988	L	FP	1.81 m (5 ft 11 in)	85 kg (187 lb)
8	Atsushi Naganuma	22 September 1982	R	FP	1.80 m (5 ft 11 in)	83 kg (183 lb)
9	Hiroki Wakamatsu	27 April 1987	R	FP	1.87 m (6 ft 2 in)	85 kg (187 lb)
10	Yoshinori Shiota	12 August 1982	R	FP	1.78 m (5 ft 10 in)	72 kg (159 lb)
11	Keigo Okawa	11 March 1990	R	FP	1.83 m (6 ft 0 in)	93 kg (205 lb)
12	Satoshi Nagata	19 February 1981	R	FP	1.86 m (6 ft 1 in)	90 kg (200 lb)
13	Naoki Shimizu	14 January 1991	R	GK	1.90 m (6 ft 3 in)	85 kg (187 lb)

== Kazakhstan ==
No.	Name	Date of birth	L/R	Position	Height	Weight
1	Alexandr Shvedov	11 April 1973	R	GK	1.93 m (6 ft 4 in)	78 kg (172 lb)
2	Sergey Gubarev	30 October 1978	L	FP	1.83 m (6 ft 0 in)	92 kg (203 lb)
3	Murat Shakenov	23 September 1990	R	FP	1.83 m (6 ft 0 in)	71 kg (157 lb)
4	Roman Pilipenko	24 December 1987	R	FP	1.84 m (6 ft 0 in)	93 kg (205 lb)
5	Alexey Panfili	5 January 1974	R	FP	1.98 m (6 ft 6 in)	105 kg (231 lb)
6	Alexandr Fenochko	29 April 1991	R	FP	1.93 m (6 ft 4 in)	95 kg (209 lb)
7	Alexandr Axenov	22 February 1979	R	FP	1.86 m (6 ft 1 in)	85 kg (187 lb)
8	Rustam Ukumanov	22 March 1986	R	FP	1.92 m (6 ft 4 in)	86 kg (190 lb)
9	Evgeniy Zhilyayev	13 July 1973	R	FP	1.91 m (6 ft 3 in)	93 kg (205 lb)
10	Mikhail Ruday	4 May 1988	R	FP	1.93 m (6 ft 4 in)	95 kg (209 lb)
11	Ravil Manafov	22 June 1985	R	FP	1.94 m (6 ft 4 in)	98 kg (216 lb)
12	Nikita Kokorin	22 July 1989	R	FP	1.93 m (6 ft 4 in)	80 kg (180 lb)
13	Alexey Demchenko	5 December 1987	R	GK	1.89 m (6 ft 2 in)	75 kg (165 lb)

== Montenegro ==
No.	Name	Date of birth	L/R	Position	Height	Weight
1	Denis Sefik	20 September 1976		GK	2.02 m (6 ft 8 in)	105 kg (231 lb)
2	Drasko Brguljan	27 December 1984		FP	1.93 m (6 ft 4 in)	85 kg (187 lb)
3	Aleksandar Radović	24 February 1987		FP	1.91 m (6 ft 3 in)	95 kg (209 lb)
4	Damjan Danilovic	1 April 1982		FP	1.83 m (6 ft 0 in)	86 kg (190 lb)
5	Nikola Vukcevic	14 November 1985		FP	1.96 m (6 ft 5 in)	105 kg (231 lb)
6	Milan Ticic	14 August 1979		FP	1.97 m (6 ft 6 in)	98 kg (216 lb)
7	Filip Klikovac	7 February 1989		FP	1.89 m (6 ft 2 in)	96 kg (212 lb)
8	Nikola Janovic	22 March 1980		FP	1.91 m (6 ft 3 in)	100 kg (220 lb)
9	Aleksandar Ivovic	1 January 1986	L	FP	#VALUE!	#VALUE!
10	Darko Brguljan	5 November 1990		FP	1.86 m (6 ft 1 in)	86 kg (190 lb)
11	Antonio Petrovic	24 September 1982		FP	1.91 m (6 ft 3 in)	88 kg (194 lb)
12	Predrag Jokic	3 February 1983	L	FP	1.88 m (6 ft 2 in)	100 kg (220 lb)
13	Milos Scepanovic	9 October 1982	R	GK	1.85 m (6 ft 1 in)	85 kg (187 lb)

== Romania ==
No.	Name	Date of birth	L/R	Position	Height	Weight
1	Dragos Constantin Stoenescu	30 May 1979	R	GK	1.97 m (6 ft 6 in)	96 kg (212 lb)
2	Cosmin Alexandru Radu	9 November 1981	L	FP	1.93 m (6 ft 4 in)	110 kg (240 lb)
3	Tiberiu Negrean	1 September 1988	R	FP	1.87 m (6 ft 2 in)	85 kg (187 lb)
4	Nicolae Virgil Diaconu	3 July 1980	L	FP	1.78 m (5 ft 10 in)	88 kg (194 lb)
5	Andrei Ionut Iosep	20 September 1977	L	FP	1.95 m (6 ft 5 in)	100 kg (220 lb)
6	Dan Andrei Busila	10 November 1980	R	FP	2.02 m (6 ft 8 in)	110 kg (240 lb)
7	Mihnea Chioveanu	21 August 1987	R	FP	1.99 m (6 ft 6 in)	108 kg (238 lb)
8	Alexandru Barabas Matei Guiman	31 December 1980	R	FP	1.96 m (6 ft 5 in)	97 kg (214 lb)
9	Dimitri Goanta	17 July 1987	R	FP	2.02 m (6 ft 8 in)	115 kg (254 lb)
10	Ramiro Georgescu	27 November 1982	R	FP	1.97 m (6 ft 6 in)	93 kg (205 lb)
11	Alexandru Andrei Ghiban	12 October 1986	R	FP	1.96 m (6 ft 5 in)	98 kg (216 lb)
12	Kalman Janos Kadar	11 June 1979	R	FP	1.90 m (6 ft 3 in)	94 kg (207 lb)
13	Eduard Mihai Dragusin	5 January 1984	R	GK	1.88 m (6 ft 2 in)	87 kg (192 lb)

== Serbia ==
No.	Name	Date of birth	L/R	Position	Height	Weight
1	Slobodan Soro	23 December 1978	R	GK	1.99 m (6 ft 6 in)	100 kg (220 lb)
2	Marko Avramovic	24 August 1986	R	FP	1.90 m (6 ft 3 in)	90 kg (200 lb)
3	Zivko Gocic	22 August 1982	R	FP	1.93 m (6 ft 4 in)	95 kg (209 lb)
4	Vanja Udovicic	12 September 1981	R	FP	1.96 m (6 ft 5 in)	102 kg (225 lb)
5	Milos Cuk	21 December 1990	R	FP	1.94 m (6 ft 4 in)	85 kg (187 lb)
6	Dusko Pijetlovic	25 April 1985	R	FP	1.93 m (6 ft 4 in)	102 kg (225 lb)
7	Slobodan Nikic	25 January 1983	R	FP	1.96 m (6 ft 5 in)	105 kg (231 lb)
8	Milan Aleksic	13 May 1986	R	FP	1.94 m (6 ft 4 in)	95 kg (209 lb)
9	Nikola Radjen	29 January 1985	R	FP	1.97 m (6 ft 6 in)	96 kg (212 lb)
10	Filip Filipovic	2 May 1987	L	FP	1.97 m (6 ft 6 in)	100 kg (220 lb)
11	Andrija Prlainovic	28 April 1987	R	FP	1.87 m (6 ft 2 in)	94 kg (207 lb)
12	Stefan Mitrovic	29 March 1988	R	FP	1.93 m (6 ft 4 in)	95 kg (209 lb)
13	Gojko Pijetlovic	7 August 1983	L	GK	1.94 m (6 ft 4 in)	96 kg (212 lb)

== South Africa ==
No.	Name	Date of birth	L/R	Position	Height	Weight
1	Grant Duane Belcher	23 November 1979	L	GK	1.84 m (6 ft 0 in)	86 kg (190 lb)
2	Pat Mccarthy		R	FP		
3	Jared Wingate Pearse	15 May 1983	R	FP	1.87 m (6 ft 2 in)	86 kg (190 lb)
4	Wesley Bohata	3 December 1992	R	FP	1.87 m (6 ft 2 in)	89 kg (196 lb)
5	Bevan Manson	11 February 1978	R	FP	1.91 m (6 ft 3 in)	92 kg (203 lb)
6	Jason Ray Kyte	25 January 1985	R	FP	2.00 m (6 ft 7 in)	98 kg (216 lb)
7	Gavin John Kyte	25 January 1985	R	FP	1.93 m (6 ft 4 in)	92 kg (203 lb)
8	Ryan Mckay Bell	30 January 1982	R	FP	2.00 m (6 ft 7 in)	115 kg (254 lb)
9	Gareth Seth Samuel	11 August 1982	R	FP	1.93 m (6 ft 4 in)	93 kg (205 lb)
10	Donn Stewart	22 August 1980	R	FP	1.91 m (6 ft 3 in)	96 kg (212 lb)
11	Adam Kajee	28 February 1987	R	FP	1.76 m (5 ft 9 in)	79 kg (174 lb)
12	Nicholas Jon Molyneux	23 June 1986	R	FP	1.85 m (6 ft 1 in)	91 kg (201 lb)
13	Matthew Andrew Chris Kemp	27 November 1984	R	GK	1.88 m (6 ft 2 in)	91 kg (201 lb)

== Spain ==
No.	Name	Date of birth	L/R	Position	Height	Weight
1	Inaki Aguilar Morillo	9 September 1983	L	GK	1.89 m (6 ft 2 in)	81 kg (179 lb)
2	Mario Jose Garcia Rodriguez	15 July 1983	L	FP	1.89 m (6 ft 2 in)	90 kg (200 lb)
3	Eric Marsal Marti	9 January 1985	L	FP	1.88 m (6 ft 2 in)	82 kg (181 lb)
4	Francisco Fernandez Miranda	21 June 1986	L	FP	1.85 m (6 ft 1 in)	83 kg (183 lb)
5	Guillermo Molina Rios	16 March 1984	L	FP	1.98 m (6 ft 6 in)	98 kg (216 lb)
6	Marc Minguell Alferez	14 January 1985	L	FP	1.86 m (6 ft 1 in)	95 kg (209 lb)
7	Marc Roca Barcelo	21 January 1988	L	FP	1.88 m (6 ft 2 in)	85 kg (187 lb)
8	Albert Espanol Lifante	29 October 1985	L	FP	1.90 m (6 ft 3 in)	85 kg (187 lb)
9	Xavier Valles Trias	4 September 1979	L	FP	1.91 m (6 ft 3 in)	105 kg (231 lb)
10	Felipe Perrone Rocha	27 February 1986	L	FP	1.83 m (6 ft 0 in)	95 kg (209 lb)
11	Ivan Ernesto Perez Vargas	29 June 1971	L	FP	1.96 m (6 ft 5 in)	110 kg (240 lb)
12	Javier Garcia Gadea	5 January 1984	L	FP	1.98 m (6 ft 6 in)	92 kg (203 lb)
13	Daniel Lopez Pinedo	16 July 1980	L	GK	1.91 m (6 ft 3 in)	87 kg (192 lb)

== United States ==
No.	Name	Date of birth	L/R	Position	Height	Weight
1	Merill Moses	13 August 1977	L	GK	2.08 m (6 ft 10 in)	95 kg (209 lb)
2	Peter Varellas	2 October 1984	L	FP	1.91 m (6 ft 3 in)	86 kg (190 lb)
3	Peter Hudnut	16 February 1981	R	FP	1.91 m (6 ft 3 in)	84 kg (185 lb)
4	Jeffery Powers	21 January 1980	R	FP	1.91 m (6 ft 3 in)	86 kg (190 lb)
5	Adam Wright	4 May 1977	R	FP	1.88 m (6 ft 2 in)	84 kg (185 lb)
6	Brian Alexander	5 March 1983	R	FP	1.83 m (6 ft 0 in)	98 kg (216 lb)
7	Ronald Beaubien	4 June 1976	R	FP	1.96 m (6 ft 5 in)	95 kg (209 lb)
8	Anthony Azevedo	21 November 1981	R	FP	1.85 m (6 ft 1 in)	82 kg (181 lb)
9	Ryan Bailey	28 August 1975	R	FP	1.96 m (6 ft 5 in)	100 kg (220 lb)
10	Timothy Hutten	4 June 1985	R	FP	1.93 m (6 ft 4 in)	91 kg (201 lb)
11	Jesse Smith	27 April 1983	R	FP	1.93 m (6 ft 4 in)	104 kg (229 lb)
12	Shea Buckner	12 December 1986	R	FP	1.93 m (6 ft 4 in)	98 kg (216 lb)
13	Andrew Stevens	4 December 1987	R	GK	1.83 m (6 ft 0 in)	91 kg (201 lb)

== See also ==
- Water polo at the 2011 World Aquatics Championships – Women's team rosters
