= 2012 Men's European Water Polo Championship squads =

This article shows all participating team squads at the 2012 Men's European Water Polo Championship held at the Pieter van den Hoogenband Swim Stadium in Eindhoven, the Netherlands, from 16 to 29 January 2012.

== Croatia ==
No.	Name	Date of birth	Position	L/R	Height	Weight	Club
1	Josip Pavić	15 January 1982	goalkeeper	R	1.95 m (6 ft 5 in)	87 kg (192 lb)	(Croatia) Mladost
2	Damir Burić	2 December 1980		R	2.05 m (6 ft 9 in)	115 kg (254 lb)	(Italy) Pro Recco
3	Miho Bošković	11 January 1983		R	1.97 m (6 ft 6 in)	101 kg (223 lb)	(Hungary) Vasas
4	Nikša Dobud	5 August 1985		R	2.00 m (6 ft 7 in)	115 kg (254 lb)	(Croatia) Jug Dubrovnik
5	Maro Joković	1 October 1987		L	2.03 m (6 ft 8 in)	96 kg (212 lb)	(Croatia) Jug Dubrovnik
6	Petar Muslim	26 March 1988		L	1.96 m (6 ft 5 in)	101 kg (223 lb)	(Croatia) Primorje
7	Frano Karač	4 June 1977		R	1.92 m (6 ft 4 in)	93 kg (205 lb)	(Croatia) Jug Dubrovnik
8	Andro Bušlje	4 January 1986		R	1.99 m (6 ft 6 in)	113 kg (249 lb)	(Croatia) Jug Dubrovnik
9	Sandro Sukno	30 June 1990		R	1.98 m (6 ft 6 in)	90 kg (200 lb)	(Italy) Pro Recco
10	Samir Barać	2 November 1973		R	1.88 m (6 ft 2 in)	94 kg (207 lb)	(Croatia) Primorje
11	Fran Paškvalin	22 November 1984		R	2.05 m (6 ft 9 in)	110 kg (240 lb)	(Croatia) Primorje
12	Paulo Obradović	9 March 1986		R	1.90 m (6 ft 3 in)	100 kg (220 lb)	(Croatia) Jug Dubrovnik
13	Ivan Buljubašić	31 October 1987		R	1.95 m (6 ft 5 in)	99 kg (218 lb)	(Croatia) Primorje
Head coach: Ratko Rudić

== Germany ==
No.	Name	Date of birth	Position	L/R	Height	Weight
1	Alexander Tchigir	6 November 1968	goalkeeper	R	1.90 m (6 ft 3 in)	82 kg (181 lb)
2	Tim Wollthan	29 April 1980		R	1.93 m (6 ft 4 in)	104 kg (229 lb)
3	Fabian Schroedter	11 September 1982		R	2.06 m (6 ft 9 in)	107 kg (236 lb)
4	Julian Real	22 December 1989		R	1.98 m (6 ft 6 in)	108 kg (238 lb)
5	Marko Stamm	30 August 1988		R	1.86 m (6 ft 1 in)	100 kg (220 lb)
6	Marc Politze	20 October 1977		R	1.96 m (6 ft 5 in)	102 kg (225 lb)
7	Erik Bukowski	18 November 1986		R	1.86 m (6 ft 1 in)	85 kg (187 lb)
8	Paul Schueler	14 June 1987		R	1.84 m (6 ft 0 in)	101 kg (223 lb)
9	Tobias Kreuzmann	15 June 1981		R	1.95 m (6 ft 5 in)	90 kg (200 lb)
10	Moritz Oeler	21 October 1985		R	1.88 m (6 ft 2 in)	84 kg (185 lb)
11	Andreas Schlotterbeck	2 March 1982		R	1.90 m (6 ft 3 in)	108 kg (238 lb)
12	Sven Roeßing	30 November 1986		R	2.01 m (6 ft 7 in)	110 kg (240 lb)
13	Roger Kong	22 September 1984	goalkeeper	R	1.86 m (6 ft 1 in)	84 kg (185 lb)

== Greece ==
No.	Name	Date of birth	Position	L/R	Height	Weight
1	Filippos Karampetsos	22 October 1977	goalkeeper	R	1.92 m (6 ft 4 in)	95 kg (209 lb)
2	Emmanouil Mylonakis	9 April 1985		R	1.84 m (6 ft 0 in)	75 kg (165 lb)
3	Andreas Miralis	21 September 1987		R	1.83 m (6 ft 0 in)	90 kg (200 lb)
4	Konstantinos Kokkinakis	9 October 1975		R	1.93 m (6 ft 4 in)	109 kg (240 lb)
5	Evangelos Delakas	8 February 1985		R	1.90 m (6 ft 3 in)	88 kg (194 lb)
6	Argyris Theodoropoulos	13 January 1981		R	1.83 m (6 ft 0 in)	85 kg (187 lb)
7	Christos Afroudakis	23 May 1984		R	1.88 m (6 ft 2 in)	88 kg (194 lb)
8	Georgios Ntoskas	11 November 1984		R	1.85 m (6 ft 1 in)	91 kg (201 lb)
9	Georgios Afroudakis	17 October 1976		R	1.94 m (6 ft 4 in)	103 kg (227 lb)
10	Ioannis Fountoulis	25 May 1988		R	1.87 m (6 ft 2 in)	87 kg (192 lb)
11	Konstantinos Mourikis	10 July 1988		R	1.98 m (6 ft 6 in)	112 kg (247 lb)
12	Matthaios Voulgarakis	14 March 1980		R	1.87 m (6 ft 2 in)	103 kg (227 lb)
13	Konstantinos Tsalkanis	23 April 1982	goalkeeper	R	1.85 m (6 ft 1 in)	91 kg (201 lb)

== Hungary ==
No.	Name	Date of birth	Position	L/R	Height	Weight	Club
1	Zoltán Szécsi	22 December 1977	goalkeeper	R	1.98 m (6 ft 6 in)	99 kg (218 lb)	(Hungary) Eger
2	Gergely Katonás	25 February 1980		R	1.93 m (6 ft 4 in)	98 kg (216 lb)	(Hungary) Vasas
3	Norbert Madaras	1 December 1979		L	1.91 m (6 ft 3 in)	91 kg (201 lb)	(Italy) Pro Recco
4	Dénes Varga	29 March 1987		R	1.93 m (6 ft 4 in)	95 kg (209 lb)	(Croatia) Primorje
5	Tamás Kásás	20 July 1976		R	2.00 m (6 ft 7 in)	95 kg (209 lb)	(Italy) Pro Recco
6	Norbert Hosnyánszky	4 March 1984		R	1.96 m (6 ft 5 in)	99 kg (218 lb)	(Hungary) Eger
7	Gergely Kiss	21 September 1977		L	1.98 m (6 ft 6 in)	112 kg (247 lb)	(Hungary) Vasas
8	Márton Szívós	19 August 1981		R	1.92 m (6 ft 4 in)	94 kg (207 lb)	(Hungary) Honvéd
9	Dániel Varga	25 September 1983		R	2.00 m (6 ft 7 in)	96 kg (212 lb)	(Croatia) Primorje
10	Péter Biros	5 April 1976		R	1.94 m (6 ft 4 in)	102 kg (225 lb)	(Hungary) Eger
11	Ádám Steinmetz	11 August 1980		R	1.98 m (6 ft 6 in)	103 kg (227 lb)	(Hungary) Vasas
12	Balázs Hárai	5 April 1987		R	2.02 m (6 ft 8 in)	113 kg (249 lb)	(Hungary) Honvéd
13	László Baksa	27 April 1986	goalkeeper	R	1.94 m (6 ft 4 in)	89 kg (196 lb)	(Hungary) Szeged
Head coach: Dénes Kemény

== Italy ==
No.	Name	Date of birth	Position	L/R	Height	Weight	Club
1	Giacomo Pastorino	7 June 1980	goalkeeper	R	1.90 m (6 ft 3 in)	84 kg (185 lb)	(Italy) Pro Recco
2	Amaurys Pérez	18 March 1976		R	1.94 m (6 ft 4 in)	98 kg (216 lb)	(Italy) Posillipo
3	Niccolò Gitto	12 October 1986		R	1.89 m (6 ft 2 in)	75 kg (165 lb)	(Italy) Pro Recco
4	Pietro Figlioli	29 May 1984		R	1.92 m (6 ft 4 in)	97 kg (214 lb)	(Italy) Pro Recco
5	Alex Giorgetti	24 December 1987		R	1.86 m (6 ft 1 in)	78 kg (172 lb)	(Italy) Pro Recco
6	Maurizio Felugo	4 March 1981		R	1.89 m (6 ft 2 in)	82 kg (181 lb)	(Italy) Pro Recco
7	Niccolò Figari	24 January 1988		R	1.93 m (6 ft 4 in)	85 kg (187 lb)	(Italy) Pro Recco
8	Valentino Gallo	17 July 1985		L	1.93 m (6 ft 4 in)	92 kg (203 lb)	(Italy) Posillipo
9	Christian Presciutti	27 November 1982		R	1.85 m (6 ft 1 in)	84 kg (185 lb)	(Italy) AN Brescia
10	Deni Fiorentini	5 June 1984		R	1.91 m (6 ft 3 in)	84 kg (185 lb)	(Italy) Pro Recco
11	Matteo Aicardi	19 April 1986		R	1.92 m (6 ft 4 in)	104 kg (229 lb)	(Italy) Savona
12	Federico Lapenna	12 February 1988		R	1.83 m (6 ft 0 in)	100 kg (220 lb)	(Italy) Pro Recco
13	Goran Volarević	2 April 1977	goalkeeper	R	1.90 m (6 ft 3 in)	90 kg (200 lb)	(Italy) Savona
Head coach: Alessandro Campagna

== Macedonia ==
No.	Name	Date of birth	Position	L/R	Height	Weight
1	Dalibor Percinic	5 May 1976	goalkeeper	R	1.89 m (6 ft 2 in)	90 kg (200 lb)
2	Igor Racunica	21 October 1979		R	1.92 m (6 ft 4 in)	98 kg (216 lb)
3	Ivan Vuksanovic	26 September 1981		R	1.83 m (6 ft 0 in)	87 kg (192 lb)
4	Sasa Misic	27 March 1978		R	1.98 m (6 ft 6 in)	107 kg (236 lb)
5	Uros Kalinic	7 April 1986		R	2.00 m (6 ft 7 in)	100 kg (220 lb)
6	Vladimir Kreckovic	23 May 1980		R	1.90 m (6 ft 3 in)	89 kg (196 lb)
7	Blagoje Ivovic	3 October 1980		R	1.93 m (6 ft 4 in)	100 kg (220 lb)
8	Dimitar Dimovski	9 September 1992		R	1.87 m (6 ft 2 in)	93 kg (205 lb)
9	Miroslav Randzic	28 March 1989		L	1.85 m (6 ft 1 in)	95 kg (209 lb)
10	Milan Petrović	7 June 1983		R	1.83 m (6 ft 0 in)	90 kg (200 lb)
11	Boris Letica	2 May 1983		R	1.98 m (6 ft 6 in)	95 kg (209 lb)
12	Danijel Benic	22 April 1977		R	2.02 m (6 ft 8 in)	110 kg (240 lb)
13	Igor Milanovic	19 May 1992		R	1.94 m (6 ft 4 in)	97 kg (214 lb)

== Montenegro ==
No.	Name	Date of birth	Position	L/R	Height	Weight	Club
1	Zdravko Radić	24 June 1979	goalkeeper	R	1.92 m (6 ft 4 in)	97 kg (214 lb)	(Croatia) Primorje
2	Draško Brguljan	27 December 1984		R	1.94 m (6 ft 4 in)	88 kg (194 lb)	(Hungary) Vasas
3	Vjekoslav Pasković	23 March 1985		R	1.81 m (5 ft 11 in)	85 kg (187 lb)	(Italy) Posillipo
4	Antonio Petrović	24 September 1982		R	1.93 m (6 ft 4 in)	95 kg (209 lb)	(Italy) Savona
5	Filip Klikovać	7 February 1989		R	1.89 m (6 ft 2 in)	96 kg (212 lb)	(Russia) Sintez Kazan
6	Aleksandar Radović	24 February 1987		R	1.91 m (6 ft 3 in)	95 kg (209 lb)	(Serbia) Partizan
7	Mlađan Janović	11 June 1984		R	1.91 m (6 ft 3 in)	94 kg (207 lb)	(Italy) Savona
8	Nikola Janović	22 March 1980		R	1.91 m (6 ft 3 in)	100 kg (220 lb)	(Croatia) Jug Dubrovnik
9	Aleksandar Ivović	24 February 1986		L	1.97 m (6 ft 6 in)	105 kg (231 lb)	(Italy) Pro Recco
10	Boris Zloković	16 March 1983		R	1.97 m (6 ft 6 in)	100 kg (220 lb)	(Italy) Pro Recco
11	Vladimir Gojković	29 January 1981		R	1.88 m (6 ft 2 in)	92 kg (203 lb)	(Montenegro) Jadran Herceg Novi
12	Predrag Jokić	3 February 1983		R	1.88 m (6 ft 2 in)	96 kg (212 lb)	(Montenegro) Budva
13	Miloš Šćepanović	9 October 1982	goalkeeper	R	1.85 m (6 ft 1 in)	89 kg (196 lb)	(Montenegro) Jadran Herceg Novi
Head coach: Ranko Perović

== Netherlands ==
No.	Name	Date of birth	Position	L/R	Height	Weight	Club
1	Jordy Stil	9 January 1986	goalkeeper	R	1.93 m (6 ft 4 in)	87 kg (192 lb)	
2	Matthijs de Bruijn	27 May 1977		R	1.92 m (6 ft 4 in)	84 kg (185 lb)	
3	Tjerk Kramer	25 March 1982		R	2.00 m (6 ft 7 in)	104 kg (229 lb)	
4	Willem Wouter Gerritse	1 January 1983		R	1.96 m (6 ft 5 in)	105 kg (231 lb)	(Hungary) Eger
5	Luuk Gielen	26 November 1990		R	2.04 m (6 ft 8 in)	106 kg (234 lb)	
6	Robin Lindhout	25 October 1990		R	1.94 m (6 ft 4 in)	110 kg (240 lb)	
7	Lars Gottemaker	29 July 1987		L	1.95 m (6 ft 5 in)	90 kg (200 lb)	
8	Yoran Frauenfelder	21 May 1992		R	1.97 m (6 ft 6 in)	96 kg (212 lb)	
9	Paul Verweij	9 March 1984		R	1.94 m (6 ft 4 in)	192 kg (423 lb)	
10	Roeland Spijker	13 May 1985		R	1.86 m (6 ft 1 in)	92 kg (203 lb)	
11	Thomas Lucas	25 April 1989		R	2.00 m (6 ft 7 in)	104 kg (229 lb)	
12	Matthijs Lucas	9 February 1986		R	1.93 m (6 ft 4 in)	95 kg (209 lb)	
13	Clement Stegman	16 December 1990	goalkeeper	R	2.02 m (6 ft 8 in)	105 kg (231 lb)	
Head coach: Johan Aantjes

== Romania ==
No.	Name	Date of birth	Position	L/R	Height	Weight	Club
1	Dragos Stoenescu	30 May 1979	goalkeeper	R	1.97 m (6 ft 6 in)	98 kg (216 lb)	
2	Cosmin Radu	9 November 1981		L	1.94 m (6 ft 4 in)	110 kg (240 lb)	(Croatia) Mladost
3	Tiberiu Negrean	1 September 1988		R	1.87 m (6 ft 2 in)	86 kg (190 lb)	(Hungary) Szolnok
4	Nicolae Diaconu	4 September 1980		R	1.78 m (5 ft 10 in)	86 kg (190 lb)	
5	Andrei Iosep	20 September 1977		L	1.95 m (6 ft 5 in)	100 kg (220 lb)	
6	Andrei Busila	10 November 1980		R	2.02 m (6 ft 8 in)	108 kg (238 lb)	
7	Alexandru Matei Guiman	31 December 1980		R	1.96 m (6 ft 5 in)	97 kg (214 lb)	
8	Mihnea Chioveanu	21 August 1987		R	1.99 m (6 ft 6 in)	108 kg (238 lb)	
9	Dimitri Goanta	17 July 1987		R	2.02 m (6 ft 8 in)	115 kg (254 lb)	
10	Ramiro Georgescu	27 November 1982		R	1.91 m (6 ft 3 in)	93 kg (205 lb)	(Hungary) Szolnok
11	Alexandru Ghiban	12 October 1986		R	1.96 m (6 ft 5 in)	96 kg (212 lb)	
12	Kalman Kadar	11 June 1979		R	1.90 m (6 ft 3 in)	94 kg (207 lb)	
13	Mihai Dragusin	5 October 1984	goalkeeper	R	1.88 m (6 ft 2 in)	86 kg (190 lb)	
Head coach: (Hungary) István Kovács

== Serbia ==
No.	Name	Date of birth	Position	L/R	Height	Weight	Club
1	Slobodan Soro	23 December 1978	goalkeeper	R	1.99 m (6 ft 6 in)	100 kg (220 lb)	(Serbia) Partizan
2	Aleksa Šaponjić	4 June 1992		R	1.97 m (6 ft 6 in)	92 kg (203 lb)	(United States) CA Golden Bears
3	Živko Gocić	22 August 1982		R	1.93 m (6 ft 4 in)	97 kg (214 lb)	(Hungary) Szolnok
4	Vanja Udovičić	12 September 1982		R	1.96 m (6 ft 5 in)	102 kg (225 lb)	(Croatia) Mladost
5	Miloš Ćuk	21 December 1990		R	1.94 m (6 ft 4 in)	85 kg (187 lb)	(Serbia) Partizan
6	Duško Pijetlović	25 April 1985		R	1.93 m (6 ft 4 in)	102 kg (225 lb)	(Italy) Pro Recco
7	Slobodan Nikić	25 January 1983		R	1.96 m (6 ft 5 in)	105 kg (231 lb)	(Italy) Camogli
8	Milan Aleksić	13 May 1986		R	1.94 m (6 ft 4 in)	95 kg (209 lb)	(Serbia) Partizan
9	Nikola Rađen	29 January 1985		R	1.97 m (6 ft 6 in)	96 kg (212 lb)	(Greece) Chios
10	Filip Filipović	2 May 1987		L	1.97 m (6 ft 6 in)	100 kg (220 lb)	(Italy) Pro Recco
11	Andrija Prlainović	28 April 1987		R	1.87 m (6 ft 2 in)	94 kg (207 lb)	(Italy) Pro Recco
12	Stefan Mitrović	29 March 1988		R	1.93 m (6 ft 4 in)	94 kg (207 lb)	(Serbia) Partizan
13	Branislav Mitrović	30 April 1985	goalkeeper	R	2.02 m (6 ft 8 in)	107 kg (236 lb)	(Hungary) Debrecen
Head coach: Dejan Udovičić

== Spain ==
No.	Name	Date of birth	Position	L/R	Height	Weight	Club
1	Iñaki Aguilar	9 September 1983	goalkeeper	R	1.89 m (6 ft 2 in)	80 kg (180 lb)	
2	Mario Garcia	15 July 1983		R	1.89 m (6 ft 2 in)	88 kg (194 lb)	
3	Blai Mallarach	21 August 1987		L	1.86 m (6 ft 1 in)	88 kg (194 lb)	
4	Balazs Sziranyi	10 January 1983		R	1.96 m (6 ft 5 in)	108 kg (238 lb)	
5	Guillermo Molina	16 March 1984		R	1.95 m (6 ft 5 in)	105 kg (231 lb)	
6	Marc Minguell	14 January 1985		R	1.87 m (6 ft 2 in)	89 kg (196 lb)	
7	Ivan Gallego	13 February 1984		R	1.86 m (6 ft 1 in)	100 kg (220 lb)	
8	Albert Español	29 October 1985		R	1.88 m (6 ft 2 in)	83 kg (183 lb)	
9	Xavier Valles	4 September 1979		R	1.92 m (6 ft 4 in)	100 kg (220 lb)	
10	Felipe Perrone	27 February 1986		R	1.83 m (6 ft 0 in)	91 kg (201 lb)	
11	Ivan Perez	29 June 1971		R	1.96 m (6 ft 5 in)	110 kg (240 lb)	
12	Xavier Garcia	5 January 1984		L	1.98 m (6 ft 6 in)	95 kg (209 lb)	
13	Daniel Lopez	16 July 1980	goalkeeper	R	1.91 m (6 ft 3 in)	88 kg (194 lb)	
Head coach: Rafael Aguilar

== Turkey ==
No.	Name	Date of birth	Position	L/R	Height	Weight
1	Atilla Sezer	13 September 1975	goalkeeper	R	1.98 m (6 ft 6 in)	110 kg (240 lb)
2	Deniz Tolga Balta	30 March 1989		R	1.94 m (6 ft 4 in)	105 kg (231 lb)
3	Berk Biyik	1 January 1993		R	1.93 m (6 ft 4 in)	102 kg (225 lb)
4	Oytun Okman	1 August 1982		R	1.90 m (6 ft 3 in)	93 kg (205 lb)
5	Berk Gunkut	9 August 1987		R	1.76 m (5 ft 9 in)	88 kg (194 lb)
6	Emre Coskun	31 July 1985		R	1.90 m (6 ft 3 in)	93 kg (205 lb)
7	Yigithan Hantal	15 September 1982		R	1.87 m (6 ft 2 in)	107 kg (236 lb)
8	Arda Inan Akyar	22 June 1990		R	1.86 m (6 ft 1 in)	83 kg (183 lb)
9	Yagiz Atakan Gedik	31 July 1993		R	1.89 m (6 ft 2 in)	96 kg (212 lb)
10	Utku Eren Tuncer	29 January 1986		R	1.74 m (5 ft 9 in)	80 kg (180 lb)
11	Alican Yilmaz	10 June 1989		R	1.88 m (6 ft 2 in)	88 kg (194 lb)
12	Alican Cagatay	15 November 1990		R	1.92 m (6 ft 4 in)	93 kg (205 lb)
13	Emirhan Yenigun	12 December 1993		R	1.92 m (6 ft 4 in)	96 kg (212 lb)
