= 2010 Men's European Water Polo Championship squads =

This article shows all participating team squads at the 2010 Men's European Water Polo Championship, held in Croatia from 29 August to 11 September 2010.

== Croatia ==
No.	Name	Date of birth	Position	L/R	Height	Weight	2010 club
1	Josip Pavic	5 January 1982	goalkeeper	R	1.95 m (6 ft 5 in)	87 kg (192 lb)	Mladost Zagreb
2	Damir Buric	2 December 1980	centre back	R	2.05 m (6 ft 9 in)	115 kg (254 lb)	Mladost Zagreb
3	Miho Boskovic	11 January 1983	centre forward	R	1.97 m (6 ft 6 in)	101 kg (223 lb)	Vasas Budapest
4	Niksa Dobud	5 August 1985	centre forward	R	2.00 m (6 ft 7 in)	115 kg (254 lb)	JUG Dubrovnik
5	Maro Jokovic	1 October 1987	centre forward	L	2.03 m (6 ft 8 in)	96 kg (212 lb)	JUG Dubrovnik
6	Petar Muslim	26 March 1988	centre forward	R			Mladost Zagreb
7	Frano Karac	4 June 1977	centre forward	R	1.92 m (6 ft 4 in)	88 kg (194 lb)	Mladost Zagreb
8	Andro Buslje	4 January 1986	centre back	R	1.99 m (6 ft 6 in)	113 kg (249 lb)	JUG Dubrovnik
9	Sandro Sukno	30 June 1990	centre forward	R	1.98 m (6 ft 6 in)	90 kg (200 lb)	JUG Dubrovnik
10	Samir Barac	2 November 1973	centre forward	R	1.88 m (6 ft 2 in)	94 kg (207 lb)	Primorje Rijeka
11	Igor Hinic	4 December 1975	centre forward	R	2.02 m (6 ft 8 in)	110 kg (240 lb)	Mladost Zagreb
12	Paulo Obradovic	9 March 1986	centre forward	R	1.90 m (6 ft 3 in)	100 kg (220 lb)	JUG Dubrovnik
13	Ivan Buljubasic	31 October 1987	centre back	R	1.99 m (6 ft 6 in)	100 kg (220 lb)	Pro Recco Genoa

== Germany ==
No.	Name	Date of birth	Position	L/R	Height	Weight	2010 club
1	Alexander Tchigir	6 November 1968		R	1.90 m (6 ft 3 in)	82 kg (181 lb)	Wfr. Spandau 04 Berlin
2	Florian Naroska	16 April 1982		R	1.98 m (6 ft 6 in)	100 kg (220 lb)	Wfr. Spandau 04 Berlin
3	Fabian Schroedter	11 September 1982		R	2.06 m (6 ft 9 in)	107 kg (236 lb)	Wfr. Spandau 04 Berlin
4	Julian Real	22 December 1989		R	1.98 m (6 ft 6 in)	108 kg (238 lb)	ASC Duisburg
5	Marko Stamm	30 August 1988		R	1.86 m (6 ft 1 in)	100 kg (220 lb)	Wfr. Spandau 04 Berlin
6	Marc Politze	20 October 1977		R	1.96 m (6 ft 5 in)	100 kg (220 lb)	CN Posillipo Neapel
7	Erik Bukowski	18 November 1986		R	1.86 m (6 ft 1 in)	85 kg (187 lb)	Wfr. Spandau 04 Berlin
8	Paul Schuler	14 June 1987		R	1.84 m (6 ft 0 in)	101 kg (223 lb)	ASC Duisburg
9	Tobias Kreuzmann	15 June 1981		R	1.95 m (6 ft 5 in)	90 kg (200 lb)	ASC Duisburg
10	Moritz Oeler	21 October 1985		R	1.88 m (6 ft 2 in)	84 kg (185 lb)	Wfr. Spandau 04 Berlin
11	Andreas Schlotterbeck	2 March 1982		R	1.90 m (6 ft 3 in)	108 kg (238 lb)	Wfr. Spandau 04 Berlin
12	Sven Roessing	30 November 1986		R	2.01 m (6 ft 7 in)	110 kg (240 lb)	SV Bayer Uerdingen 08
13	Roger Kong	22 September 1984		R	1.86 m (6 ft 1 in)	84 kg (185 lb)	Wfr. Spandau 04 Berlin

== Greece ==
No.	Name	Date of birth	Position	L/R	Height	Weight	2010 club
1	Konstantinos Tsalkanis	23 April 1982		R	1.85 m (6 ft 1 in)	93 kg (205 lb)	NC Vouliagmeni
2	Emmanouil Mylonakis	9 April 1985		R	1.85 m (6 ft 1 in)	75 kg (165 lb)	Olympiacos
3	Panagiotis Papadogkonas	16 September 1987		R	1.85 m (6 ft 1 in)	91 kg (201 lb)	Panionios
4	Andreas Miralis	21 September 1987		R	1.83 m (6 ft 0 in)	87 kg (192 lb)	Panionios
5	Evangelos Delakas	8 February 1985		R	1.89 m (6 ft 2 in)	89 kg (196 lb)	Olympiacos
6	Ioannis Fountoulis	25 May 1988		R	1.86 m (6 ft 1 in)	87 kg (192 lb)	Olympiacos
7	Christos Afroudakis	23 May 1984		R	1.88 m (6 ft 2 in)	86 kg (190 lb)	Olympiacos
8	Georgios Ntoskas	11 November 1984		R	1.85 m (6 ft 1 in)	90 kg (200 lb)	Olympiacos
9	Konstantinos Mourikis	11 July 1988		R	1.97 m (6 ft 6 in)	110 kg (240 lb)	Panionios
10	Dimitrios Miteloudis	11 February 1982		R	1.87 m (6 ft 2 in)	94 kg (207 lb)	
11	Alexandros Gounas	3 October 1989		R	1.78 m (5 ft 10 in)	73 kg (161 lb)	NC Vouliagmeni
12	Christodoulos Kolomvos	26 October 1988		R	1.86 m (6 ft 1 in)	102 kg (225 lb)	NO Patras
13	Konstantinos Galanidis	1 September 1990		R	2.00 m (6 ft 7 in)	110 kg (240 lb)	Panionios

== Hungary ==
No.	Name	Date of birth	Position	L/R	Height	Weight	Club
1	Zoltán Szécsi	22 December 1977		R	1.98 m (6 ft 6 in)	96 kg (212 lb)	(Hungary) Eger
2	Béla Török	23 March 1990		R	2.05 m (6 ft 9 in)	110 kg (240 lb)	(Hungary) Szeged
3	Norbert Madaras	1 December 1979		L	1.91 m (6 ft 3 in)	91 kg (201 lb)	(Italy) Pro Recco
4	Dénes Varga	29 March 1987		R	1.93 m (6 ft 4 in)	97 kg (214 lb)	(Croatia) Primorje
5	Erik Bundschuh	14 July 1989		R	2.05 m (6 ft 9 in)	110 kg (240 lb)	(Hungary) Eger
6	Norbert Hosnyánszky	4 March 1984		R	1.96 m (6 ft 5 in)	94 kg (207 lb)	(Hungary) Eger
7	Márton Vámos	24 June 1992		L	2.02 m (6 ft 8 in)	97 kg (214 lb)	(Hungary) KSI, Vasas (loan)
8	Márton Szívós	19 August 1981		R	1.92 m (6 ft 4 in)	92 kg (203 lb)	(Hungary) Honvéd
9	Dániel Varga	25 September 1983		R	2.00 m (6 ft 7 in)	95 kg (209 lb)	(Croatia) Primorje
10	Péter Biros	5 April 1976		R	1.94 m (6 ft 4 in)	95 kg (209 lb)	(Hungary) Eger
11	Gábor Kis	27 September 1982		R	1.94 m (6 ft 4 in)	108 kg (238 lb)	(Hungary) Eger
12	Balázs Hárai	5 April 1987		L	2.02 m (6 ft 8 in)	110 kg (240 lb)	(Hungary) Honvéd
13	Viktor Nagy	24 July 1984		R	1.98 m (6 ft 6 in)	94 kg (207 lb)	(Hungary) Vasas
Head coach: Dénes Kemény

== Italy ==
No.	Name	Date of birth	Position	L/R	Height	Weight	2010 club
1	Stefano Tempesti	9 June 1979		R	2.05 m (6 ft 9 in)	97 kg (214 lb)	Pro Recco Genoa
2	Stefano Luongo	5 January 1990		R	1.98 m (6 ft 6 in)	84 kg (185 lb)	R.N. Sori
3	Niccolo Gitto	12 October 1986		R	1.89 m (6 ft 2 in)	76 kg (168 lb)	Lake Iseo Brixia
4	Pietro Figlioli	29 May 1984		R	1.92 m (6 ft 4 in)	97 kg (214 lb)	Pro Recco Genoa
5	Zeno Bertoli	22 December 1988		R			CN Posillipo
6	Maurizio Felugo	4 March 1981		R	1.89 m (6 ft 2 in)	82 kg (181 lb)	Pro Recco Genoa
7	Massimo Giacoppo	10 May 1983		R	1.84 m (6 ft 0 in)	92 kg (203 lb)	R.N. Savona
8	Valentino Gallo	17 July 1985		L	1.93 m (6 ft 4 in)	92 kg (203 lb)	C.N. Posillipo Naples
9	Christian Presciutti	27 November 1982		R	1.85 m (6 ft 1 in)	84 kg (185 lb)	Lake Iseo Brixia
10	Deni Fiorentini	5 June 1984		R	1.91 m (6 ft 3 in)	84 kg (185 lb)	R.N. Savona
11	Matteo Aicardi	19 March 1986		R	1.92 m (6 ft 4 in)	104 kg (229 lb)	R.N. Savona
12	Arnaldo Deserti	1 April 1979		R	1.89 m (6 ft 2 in)	102 kg (225 lb)	R.N. Bogliasco
13	Giacomo Pastorino	7 June 1980		R	1.90 m (6 ft 3 in)	84 kg (185 lb)	R.N. Savona

== Macedonia ==
No.	Name	Date of birth	Position	L/R	Height	Weight	2010 club
1	Dalibor Percinic	5 May 1976		R	1.89 m (6 ft 2 in)	90 kg (200 lb)	
2	Igor Racunica	21 October 1979		R	1.92 m (6 ft 4 in)	98 kg (216 lb)	VK Koper
3	Ivan Vuksanovic	26 September 1981		R	1.83 m (6 ft 0 in)	87 kg (192 lb)	
4	Zdravko Delas	27 June 1982		R	1.95 m (6 ft 5 in)	113 kg (249 lb)	Lazio Rome
5	Nenad Bosancic	18 December 1982		L	1.90 m (6 ft 3 in)	96 kg (212 lb)	VK Rabotnicki
6	Vladimir Kreckovic	23 May 1980		R	1.90 m (6 ft 3 in)	89 kg (196 lb)	VK Rabotnicki
7	Blagoje Ivovic	3 October 1980		R	1.93 m (6 ft 4 in)	100 kg (220 lb)	Barceloneta
8	Edi Brkic	23 November 1974		L	1.90 m (6 ft 3 in)	96 kg (212 lb)	VK Sibenik
9	Dimitar Dimovski	9 August 1992		R	1.87 m (6 ft 2 in)	93 kg (205 lb)	VK Rabotnicki
10	Vladimir Latkovic	31 March 1981		R	1.89 m (6 ft 2 in)	88 kg (194 lb)	Fenix Rabotniki
11	Nenad Petrovic	3 May 1977		R	2.05 m (6 ft 9 in)	103 kg (227 lb)	
12	Danijel Benic	22 April 1977		R	2.02 m (6 ft 8 in)	110 kg (240 lb)	Fenix Rabotnicki
13	Bojan Janewski	8 January 1990		R	1.80 m (5 ft 11 in)	73 kg (161 lb)	VK Rabotnicki

== Montenegro ==
No.	Name	Date of birth	Position	L/R	Height	Weight	2010 club
1	Zdravko Radic	24 June 1979	goalkeeper	R	1.92 m (6 ft 4 in)	97 kg (214 lb)	Primorac Kotor
2	Antonio Petrovic	24 September 1982	centre back	R	1.93 m (6 ft 4 in)	96 kg (212 lb)	Primorac Kotor
3	Vjekoslav Paskovic	23 March 1985	centre forward	R	1.81 m (5 ft 11 in)	85 kg (187 lb)	Budva
4	Damjan Danilovic	1 April 1982	centre forward	L	1.83 m (6 ft 0 in)	87 kg (192 lb)	Veselin Krivokapic
5	Nikola Vukcevic	14 November 1985	centre forward	R	1.99 m (6 ft 6 in)	107 kg (236 lb)	Budva
6	Milan Ticic	14 August 1979	centre back	R	1.96 m (6 ft 5 in)	100 kg (220 lb)	Budva
7	Mladjan Janovic	11 June 1984	centre forward	R	1.91 m (6 ft 3 in)	94 kg (207 lb)	Savona
8	Nikola Janovic	22 March 1980	centre forward	R	1.91 m (6 ft 3 in)	100 kg (220 lb)	Jadran Herceg Novi
9	Aleksandar Ivovic	24 February 1986	centre back	R	1.98 m (6 ft 6 in)	105 kg (231 lb)	Pro Recco Genoa
10	Boris Zlokovic	16 March 1983	centre forward	R	1.97 m (6 ft 6 in)	100 kg (220 lb)	Pro Recco Genoa
11	Vladimir Gojkovic	29 January 1981	centre forward	R	1.88 m (6 ft 2 in)	94 kg (207 lb)	Jadran Herceg Novi
12	Predrag Jokic	3 February 1983	centre back	R	1.88 m (6 ft 2 in)	99 kg (218 lb)	Budva
13	Denis Sefik	20 September 1976	goalkeeper	R	1.98 m (6 ft 6 in)	115 kg (254 lb)	

== Romania ==
No.	Name	Date of birth	Position	L/R	Height	Weight	2010 club
1	Dragos Stoenescu	30 May 1979		R	1.97 m (6 ft 6 in)	97 kg (214 lb)	Dinamo Bucharest
2	Cosmin Radu	9 November 1981		L	1.94 m (6 ft 4 in)	110 kg (240 lb)	Rari Nantes Florence
3	Tiberiu Negrean	1 September 1988		R	1.87 m (6 ft 2 in)	86 kg (190 lb)	SCM Oradea
4	Nicolae Diaconu	4 September 1980		R	1.78 m (5 ft 10 in)	85 kg (187 lb)	Oradea
5	Andrei Iosep	20 September 1977		L	1.96 m (6 ft 5 in)	100 kg (220 lb)	C.W. Havarra
6	Andrei Busila	10 November 1980		R	2.02 m (6 ft 8 in)	108 kg (238 lb)	Szeged Beton
7	Mihnea Chioveanu	21 August 1987		R	1.99 m (6 ft 6 in)	115 kg (254 lb)	CSM Oradea
8	Alexandru Matei Guiman	31 December 1980		R	1.95 m (6 ft 5 in)	95 kg (209 lb)	C.S. Dinamo Bucharest
9	Andrei Cretu	21 September 1989		R	1.85 m (6 ft 1 in)	85 kg (187 lb)	CSM Oradea
10	Ramiro Georgescu	27 November 1982		R	1.91 m (6 ft 3 in)	93 kg (205 lb)	Szolnok
11	Alexandru Ghiban	12 October 1986		R	1.96 m (6 ft 5 in)	96 kg (212 lb)	Steaua Bucharest
12	Kalman Kadar	11 June 1979		R	1.90 m (6 ft 3 in)	94 kg (207 lb)	CSM Oradea
13	Mihai Dragusin	5 January 1984		R	1.88 m (6 ft 2 in)	86 kg (190 lb)	Steaua Bucharest

== Russia ==
No.	Name	Date of birth	Position	L/R	Height	Weight	2010 club
1	Dmitry Dugin	29 August 1968		R	1.83 m (6 ft 0 in)	85 kg (187 lb)	R.N. Cagliari
2	Vladimir Basik	14 June 1979		R	1.96 m (6 ft 5 in)	98 kg (216 lb)	Sintez Kazan
3	Vitaly Yurchik	17 May 1983		R	2.03 m (6 ft 8 in)	120 kg (260 lb)	Spartak Volgograd
4	Alexey Ryzhov-Alenichev	20 February 1989		R	2.00 m (6 ft 7 in)	84 kg (185 lb)	Shturm Chekhov
5	Yury Zheltovskiy	30 July 1979		R	1.76 m (5 ft 9 in)	80 kg (180 lb)	Shturm Chekhov
6	Dmitry Antipov	1 September 1984		R	1.95 m (6 ft 5 in)	104 kg (229 lb)	Dinamo Moscow
7	Pavel Khalturin	15 September 1983		R	1.94 m (6 ft 4 in)	100 kg (220 lb)	Spartak Volgograd
8	Dmitry Stratan	24 January 1975		R	1.96 m (6 ft 5 in)	106 kg (234 lb)	Shturm 2002
9	Kirill Novoksenov	20 July 1985		R	1.87 m (6 ft 2 in)	85 kg (187 lb)	Dinamo Moscow
10	Marat Zakirov	8 November 1973		R	1.80 m (5 ft 11 in)	80 kg (180 lb)	Sintez Kazan
11	Sergey Lisunov	3 November 1986		R	1.98 m (6 ft 6 in)	114 kg (251 lb)	Spartak Volgograd
12	Alexey Agarkov	6 August 1983		R	1.86 m (6 ft 1 in)	90 kg (200 lb)	Spartak Volgograd
13	Egor Rastorguev	10 March 1985		R	1.90 m (6 ft 3 in)	100 kg (220 lb)	Dinamo Moscow

== Serbia ==
No.	Name	Date of birth	Position	L/R	Height	Weight	2010 club
1	Slobodan Soro	23 December 1978	goalkeeper	R	1.99 m (6 ft 6 in)	100 kg (220 lb)	Partizan Belgrade
2	Marko Avramovic	24 August 1986	centre back	R	1.90 m (6 ft 3 in)	90 kg (200 lb)	Partizan Belgrade
3	Zivko Gocic	22 August 1982	centre forward	R	1.93 m (6 ft 4 in)	96 kg (212 lb)	Partizan Belgrade
4	Vanja Udovicic	12 September 1982	centre back	R	1.96 m (6 ft 5 in)	102 kg (225 lb)	
5	Boris Vapenski	9 October 1990	centre forward	L	1.88 m (6 ft 2 in)	90 kg (200 lb)	Vojvodina Novi Sad
6	Dusko Pijetlovic	25 April 1985	centre forward	R	1.93 m (6 ft 4 in)	102 kg (225 lb)	Partizan Belgrade
7	Slobodan Nikic	25 January 1983	centre forward	R	1.96 m (6 ft 5 in)	105 kg (231 lb)	Pro Recco Genoa
8	Milan Aleksic	13 May 1986	centre back	R	1.94 m (6 ft 4 in)	105 kg (231 lb)	Partizan Belgrade
9	Nikola Raden	29 January 1985	centre back	R	1.97 m (6 ft 6 in)	99 kg (218 lb)	Partizan Belgrade
10	Filip Filipovic	2 May 1987	centre forward	L	1.97 m (6 ft 6 in)	100 kg (220 lb)	Pro Recco Genoa
11	Andrija Prlainovic	28 April 1987	centre forward	R	1.87 m (6 ft 2 in)	94 kg (207 lb)	Partizan Belgrade
12	Stefan Mitrovic	29 March 1988	centre forward	R	1.93 m (6 ft 4 in)	90 kg (200 lb)	Partizan Belgrade
13	Gojko Pijetlovic	7 August 1983	goalkeeper	R	1.94 m (6 ft 4 in)	95 kg (209 lb)	Budvanska Rivijera

== Spain ==
No.	Name	Date of birth	Position	L/R	Height	Weight	2010 club
1	Inaki Aguilar	9 September 1983		R	1.89 m (6 ft 2 in)	80 kg (180 lb)	C.N. Barcelona
2	Mario Garcia	15 July 1983		R	1.89 m (6 ft 2 in)	88 kg (194 lb)	C.N. Alcorcon Arena
3	David Martin	2 January 1977		R	1.76 m (5 ft 9 in)	78 kg (172 lb)	Atletic Barceloneta
4	Balazs Sziranyi	10 January 1983		R	1.96 m (6 ft 5 in)	108 kg (238 lb)	CN Barcelona
5	Guillermo Molina	16 March 1984		R	1.95 m (6 ft 5 in)	105 kg (231 lb)	Brixia Leonessa Brescia
6	Marc Minguell	14 January 1985		R	1.87 m (6 ft 2 in)	89 kg (196 lb)	Atletic Barceloneta
7	Ivan Gallego	13 February 1984		R	1.86 m (6 ft 1 in)	100 kg (220 lb)	C.N. Terrassa
8	Albert Espanol	29 October 1985		R	1.88 m (6 ft 2 in)	83 kg (183 lb)	Atletic Barceloneta
9	Xavier Valles	4 September 1979		R	1.92 m (6 ft 4 in)	100 kg (220 lb)	Atletic Barceloneta
10	Felipe Perrone	27 February 1986		R	1.83 m (6 ft 0 in)	91 kg (201 lb)	R.N. Savona
11	Blai Mallarach	21 August 1987		L	1.86 m (6 ft 1 in)	88 kg (194 lb)	CN Barcelona
12	Xavier Garcia	5 January 1984		L	1.98 m (6 ft 6 in)	95 kg (209 lb)	Atletic Barceloneta
13	Daniel Lopez	16 April 1980		R	1.91 m (6 ft 3 in)	88 kg (194 lb)	Atletic Barceloneta

== Turkey ==
No.	Name	Date of birth	Position	L/R	Height	Weight	2010 club
1	Atilla Sezer	13 September 1975	goalkeeper	R	1.98 m (6 ft 6 in)	110 kg (240 lb)	IYIK
2	Can Gozusulu	11 February 1991	centre forward	R	1.80 m (5 ft 11 in)	68 kg (150 lb)	GS
3	Deniz Tolga Balta	30 March 1989	centre forward	R	1.94 m (6 ft 4 in)	103 kg (227 lb)	Enka
4	Oytun Okman	1 August 1982	centre forward	R	1.90 m (6 ft 3 in)	88 kg (194 lb)	GS
5	Berk Gunkut	9 August 1987	centre forward	R	1.75 m (5 ft 9 in)	84 kg (185 lb)	IYIK
6	Emre Coskun	31 July 1985	centre forward	R	1.90 m (6 ft 3 in)	85 kg (187 lb)	IYIK
7	Serdar Hakyemez	28 May 1976	centre back	R	1.90 m (6 ft 3 in)	86 kg (190 lb)	ASSK
8	Alican Cagatay	8 June 1979	centre forward	R	1.90 m (6 ft 3 in)	88 kg (194 lb)	GS
9	Yigithan Hantal	15 September 1982	centre forward	R	1.88 m (6 ft 2 in)	106 kg (234 lb)	IYIK
10	Anil Sonmez	26 January 1984	centre forward	R	1.81 m (5 ft 11 in)	75 kg (165 lb)	HSSK
11	Halil Beskardesler	16 June 1983	centre forward	R	1.86 m (6 ft 1 in)	93 kg (205 lb)	GS
12	Can Guven	1 February 1982	centre forward	R	1.76 m (5 ft 9 in)	74 kg (163 lb)	HSSK
13	Tarkan Guveli	7 October 1977	goalkeeper	R	1.85 m (6 ft 1 in)	92 kg (203 lb)	ASSK
