= Water polo at the 2011 World Aquatics Championships – Men's tournament =

Tournament details
- Venue: China (in Shanghai host cities)
- Dates: 18 – 30 July
- Teams: 16 (from 5 confederations)

Final positions
- Champions: Italy (3rd title)
- Runners-up: Serbia
- Third place: Croatia
- Fourth place: Hungary

Tournament statistics
- Matches played: 48
- Goals scored: 898 (18.71 per match)
- Attendance: 28,500 (594 per match)
- Top scorers: (Romania) Cosmin Radu (20 goals)

Awards
- Best player: (Serbia) Filip Filipović

The men's water polo tournament at the 2011 World Aquatics Championships, organised by the FINA, was held in Shanghai, China from 18 to 30 July 2011.

The top three teams (excluding the already qualified Serbia) qualified for the 2012 Summer Olympics.

== Qualification ==
Event	Date	Location	Vacancies	Qualified
Host nation	–	–	1	China
2010 FINA Men's Water Polo World League		Various	2	Serbia; Montenegro
2010 FINA Men's Water Polo World Cup	July 27– August 1, 2010	(Romania) Oradea	4	Croatia; Spain; United States; Romania
Europe	–	–	3	Italy; Hungary; Germany
Americas Qualification tournament	January 9– January 13, 2011	(Canada) Victoria	2	Canada; Brazil
Asian Games	November 18–25, 2010	(China) Guangzhou	2	Kazakhstan; Japan
Africa	–	–	1	South Africa
Oceania	–	–	1	Australia
TOTAL			16	

=== Groups formed ===
The draw resulted in the following groups:

Group A	Group B	Group C	Group D
Hungary	Australia	Brazil	Germany
Kazakhstan	China	Canada	Italy
Montenegro	Romania	Croatia	South Africa
Spain	Serbia	Japan	United States

== Preliminary round ==
All times are China Standard Time (UTC+8)

Qualified for the quarterfinals
Qualified for the playoff round
Advance to placement matches

The draw for the competition was held on April 15, 2011.

=== Group A ===
Team	Played	W	D	L	GF	GA	GD	Pts
Hungary	3	3	0	0	39	26	+13	6
Montenegro	3	2	0	1	35	23	+12	4
Spain	3	1	0	2	36	26	+10	2
Kazakhstan	3	0	0	3	15	50	–35	0

July 18, 2011; 09:30	Match 1	Hungary	11–10	Montenegro	Shanghai Oriental Sports Center, Shanghai; Attendance: 600; Referees: Naumov (RUS), Tulga (TUR)
July 18, 2011; 09:30	Match 1	Score by quarters: 2–3, 3–2, 2–4, 4–1			Shanghai Oriental Sports Center, Shanghai; Attendance: 600; Referees: Naumov (RUS), Tulga (TUR)
July 18, 2011; 09:30	Match 1	Biros 4	Goals	Janović, Ivović 2	Shanghai Oriental Sports Center, Shanghai; Attendance: 600; Referees: Naumov (RUS), Tulga (TUR)

July 18, 2011; 10:30	Match 2	Kazakhstan	5–18	Spain	Shanghai Oriental Sports Center, Shanghai; Attendance: 550; Referees: Cabral (BRA), Rotsart (USA)
July 18, 2011; 10:30	Match 2	Score by quarters: 1–3, 0–4, 2–5, 2–6			Shanghai Oriental Sports Center, Shanghai; Attendance: 550; Referees: Cabral (BRA), Rotsart (USA)
July 18, 2011; 10:30	Match 2	Zhilyayev 3	Goals	four players 3	Shanghai Oriental Sports Center, Shanghai; Attendance: 550; Referees: Cabral (BRA), Rotsart (USA)

July 20, 2011; 18:30	Match 14	Spain	7–9	Montenegro	Shanghai Oriental Sports Center, Shanghai; Attendance: 650; Referees: Caputi (ITA), Bock (GER)
July 20, 2011; 18:30	Match 14	Score by quarters: 1–3, 1–2, 2–1, 3–3			Shanghai Oriental Sports Center, Shanghai; Attendance: 650; Referees: Caputi (ITA), Bock (GER)
July 20, 2011; 18:30	Match 14	Minguell, Vallès 2	Goals	Janović, Brguljan 2	Shanghai Oriental Sports Center, Shanghai; Attendance: 650; Referees: Caputi (ITA), Bock (GER)

July 20, 2011; 19:30	Match 15	Hungary	16–5	Kazakhstan	Shanghai Oriental Sports Center, Shanghai; Attendance: 600; Referees: Peris (CRO), Deslieres (CAN)
July 20, 2011; 19:30	Match 15	Score by quarters: 4–1, 4–0, 3–2, 5–2			Shanghai Oriental Sports Center, Shanghai; Attendance: 600; Referees: Peris (CRO), Deslieres (CAN)
July 20, 2011; 19:30	Match 15	four players 3	Goals	Zhilyayev 2	Shanghai Oriental Sports Center, Shanghai; Attendance: 600; Referees: Peris (CRO), Deslieres (CAN)

July 22, 2011; 17:00	Match 21	Hungary	12–11	Spain	Shanghai Oriental Sports Center, Shanghai; Attendance: 650; Referees: Peris (CRO), Koganov (AZE)
July 22, 2011; 17:00	Match 21	Score by quarters: 5–5, 4–3, 2–1, 1–2			Shanghai Oriental Sports Center, Shanghai; Attendance: 650; Referees: Peris (CRO), Koganov (AZE)
July 22, 2011; 17:00	Match 21	Madaras, Hárai 3	Goals	Perez 3	Shanghai Oriental Sports Center, Shanghai; Attendance: 650; Referees: Peris (CRO), Koganov (AZE)

July 22, 2011; 18:30	Match 22	Kazakhstan	5–16	Montenegro	Shanghai Oriental Sports Center, Shanghai; Attendance: 450; Referees: Koryzna (POL), Gonzalez (PUR)
July 22, 2011; 18:30	Match 22	Score by quarters: 2–5, 0–5, 0–2, 3–4			Shanghai Oriental Sports Center, Shanghai; Attendance: 450; Referees: Koryzna (POL), Gonzalez (PUR)
July 22, 2011; 18:30	Match 22	Zhilyayev 3	Goals	Radovic 4	Shanghai Oriental Sports Center, Shanghai; Attendance: 450; Referees: Koryzna (POL), Gonzalez (PUR)

=== Group B ===
Team	Pld	W	D	L	GF	GA	GD	Pts
Serbia	3	3	0	0	41	19	+22	6
Australia	3	2	0	1	30	27	+3	4
Romania	3	1	0	2	27	31	–4	2
China	3	0	0	3	22	43	–21	0

July 18, 2011; 12:40	Match 3	Romania	8–9	Australia	Shanghai Oriental Sports Center, Shanghai; Attendance: 500; Referees: Peris (CRO), Koganov (AZE)
July 18, 2011; 12:40	Match 3	Score by quarters: 2–1, 2–1, 3–3, 1–4			Shanghai Oriental Sports Center, Shanghai; Attendance: 500; Referees: Peris (CRO), Koganov (AZE)
July 18, 2011; 12:40	Match 3	Three players 2	Goals	Miller 3	Shanghai Oriental Sports Center, Shanghai; Attendance: 500; Referees: Peris (CRO), Koganov (AZE)

July 18, 2011; 21:00	Match 8	Serbia	17–5	China	Shanghai Oriental Sports Center, Shanghai; Attendance: 400; Referees: Flahive (AUS), Reemnet (NED)
July 18, 2011; 21:00	Match 8	Score by quarters: 5–1, 3–0, 2–2, 7–2			Shanghai Oriental Sports Center, Shanghai; Attendance: 400; Referees: Flahive (AUS), Reemnet (NED)
July 18, 2011; 21:00	Match 8	Filipović 4	Goals	Five players 1	Shanghai Oriental Sports Center, Shanghai; Attendance: 400; Referees: Flahive (AUS), Reemnet (NED)

July 20, 2011; 09:30	Match 9	Serbia	12–5	Romania	Shanghai Oriental Sports Center, Shanghai; Attendance: 350; Referees: Stavridis (GRE), Rotsart (USA)
July 20, 2011; 09:30	Match 9	Score by quarters: 3–1, 3–1, 3–1, 3–2			Shanghai Oriental Sports Center, Shanghai; Attendance: 350; Referees: Stavridis (GRE), Rotsart (USA)
July 20, 2011; 09:30	Match 9	Pijetlović 4	Goals	Radu 2	Shanghai Oriental Sports Center, Shanghai; Attendance: 350; Referees: Stavridis (GRE), Rotsart (USA)

July 20, 2011; 21:00	Match 16	Australia	12–7	China	Shanghai Oriental Sports Center, Shanghai; Attendance: 550; Referees: Koryzna (POL), Pinker (RSA)
July 20, 2011; 21:00	Match 16	Score by quarters: 1–2, 1–2, 3–2, 7–1			Shanghai Oriental Sports Center, Shanghai; Attendance: 550; Referees: Koryzna (POL), Pinker (RSA)
July 20, 2011; 21:00	Match 16	Campbell, Younger 3	Goals	Pan Ning, Li Bin 2	Shanghai Oriental Sports Center, Shanghai; Attendance: 550; Referees: Koryzna (POL), Pinker (RSA)

July 22, 2011; 14:55	Match 23	Serbia	12–9	Australia	Shanghai Oriental Sports Center, Shanghai; Attendance: 550; Referees: Caputi (ITA), Bock (GER)
July 22, 2011; 14:55	Match 23	Score by quarters: 5–3, 2–1, 3–2, 2–3			Shanghai Oriental Sports Center, Shanghai; Attendance: 550; Referees: Caputi (ITA), Bock (GER)
July 22, 2011; 14:55	Match 23	Filipović 5	Goals	three players 2	Shanghai Oriental Sports Center, Shanghai; Attendance: 550; Referees: Caputi (ITA), Bock (GER)

July 22, 2011; 21:00	Match 24	Romania	14–10	China	Shanghai Oriental Sports Center, Shanghai; Attendance: 550; Referees: Rotsart (USA), Deslieres (CAN)
July 22, 2011; 21:00	Match 24	Score by quarters: 2–3, 3–3, 5–0, 4–4			Shanghai Oriental Sports Center, Shanghai; Attendance: 550; Referees: Rotsart (USA), Deslieres (CAN)
July 22, 2011; 21:00	Match 24	Radu 8	Goals	Pan Ning 3	Shanghai Oriental Sports Center, Shanghai; Attendance: 550; Referees: Rotsart (USA), Deslieres (CAN)

=== Group C ===
Team	Pld	W	D	L	GF	GA	GD	Pts
Croatia	3	3	0	0	43	16	+27	6
Canada	3	2	0	1	28	25	+3	4
Japan	3	1	0	2	25	40	–15	2
Brazil	3	0	0	3	25	40	–15	0

July 18, 2011; 13:45	Match 4	Brazil	5–14	Croatia	Shanghai Oriental Sports Center, Shanghai; Attendance: 250; Referees: Gonzalez (PUR), Ciric (SRB)
July 18, 2011; 13:45	Match 4	Score by quarters: 0–5, 1–3, 3–4, 1–2			Shanghai Oriental Sports Center, Shanghai; Attendance: 250; Referees: Gonzalez (PUR), Ciric (SRB)
July 18, 2011; 13:45	Match 4	Crivella 2	Goals	Bošković 4	Shanghai Oriental Sports Center, Shanghai; Attendance: 250; Referees: Gonzalez (PUR), Ciric (SRB)

July 18, 2011; 17:00	Match 5	Japan	5–11	Canada	Shanghai Oriental Sports Center, Shanghai; Attendance: 700; Referees: Williams (NZL), Alexandrescu (ROU)
July 18, 2011; 17:00	Match 5	Score by quarters: 1–3, 2–2, 0–3, 2–3			Shanghai Oriental Sports Center, Shanghai; Attendance: 700; Referees: Williams (NZL), Alexandrescu (ROU)
July 18, 2011; 17:00	Match 5	five players 1	Goals	Graham 5	Shanghai Oriental Sports Center, Shanghai; Attendance: 700; Referees: Williams (NZL), Alexandrescu (ROU)

July 20, 2011; 10:45	Match 10	Canada	4–11	Croatia	Shanghai Oriental Sports Center, Shanghai; Attendance: 300; Referees: Borrell (ESP), Williams (NZL)
July 20, 2011; 10:45	Match 10	Score by quarters: 1–3, 3–3, 0–3, 0–2			Shanghai Oriental Sports Center, Shanghai; Attendance: 300; Referees: Borrell (ESP), Williams (NZL)
July 20, 2011; 10:45	Match 10	four players 1	Goals	Dobud 4	Shanghai Oriental Sports Center, Shanghai; Attendance: 300; Referees: Borrell (ESP), Williams (NZL)

July 20, 2011; 12:40	Match 11	Brazil	11–13	Japan	Shanghai Oriental Sports Center, Shanghai; Attendance: 500; Referees: Brgulian (MNE), Ni (CHN)
July 20, 2011; 12:40	Match 11	Score by quarters: 4–2, 2–4, 1–3, 4–4			Shanghai Oriental Sports Center, Shanghai; Attendance: 500; Referees: Brgulian (MNE), Ni (CHN)
July 20, 2011; 12:40	Match 11	Silva, Franco 3	Goals	Shimizu 4	Shanghai Oriental Sports Center, Shanghai; Attendance: 500; Referees: Brgulian (MNE), Ni (CHN)

July 22, 2011; 09:30	Match 17	Brazil	9–13	Canada	Shanghai Oriental Sports Center, Shanghai; Attendance: 400; Referees: Brgulian (MNE), Flahive (AUS)
July 22, 2011; 09:30	Match 17	Score by quarters: 1–2, 1–4, 3–4, 4–3			Shanghai Oriental Sports Center, Shanghai; Attendance: 400; Referees: Brgulian (MNE), Flahive (AUS)
July 22, 2011; 09:30	Match 17	Guimaraes 3	Goals	Diggle 5	Shanghai Oriental Sports Center, Shanghai; Attendance: 400; Referees: Brgulian (MNE), Flahive (AUS)

July 22, 2011; 10:15	Match 18	Japan	7–18	Croatia	Shanghai Oriental Sports Center, Shanghai; Attendance: 500; Referees: Ni (CHN), Balfanvayev (KAZ)
July 22, 2011; 10:15	Match 18	Score by quarters: 1–6, 1–3, 2–4, 3–5			Shanghai Oriental Sports Center, Shanghai; Attendance: 500; Referees: Ni (CHN), Balfanvayev (KAZ)
July 22, 2011; 10:15	Match 18	three players 2	Goals	Joković 3	Shanghai Oriental Sports Center, Shanghai; Attendance: 500; Referees: Ni (CHN), Balfanvayev (KAZ)

=== Group D ===
Team	Pld	W	D	L	GF	GA	GD	Pts
Italy	3	3	0	0	32	12	+20	6
Germany	3	2	0	1	31	22	+9	4
United States	3	1	0	2	32	20	+12	2
South Africa	3	0	0	3	12	53	–41	0

July 18, 2011; 20:55	Match 6	United States	7–9	Germany	Shanghai Oriental Sports Center, Shanghai; Attendance: 800; Referees: Brgulian (MNE), Stavridis (GRE)
July 18, 2011; 20:55	Match 6	Score by quarters: 0–4, 2–2, 4–1, 1–2			Shanghai Oriental Sports Center, Shanghai; Attendance: 800; Referees: Brgulian (MNE), Stavridis (GRE)
July 18, 2011; 20:55	Match 6	Azevedo 2	Goals	Oeler 3	Shanghai Oriental Sports Center, Shanghai; Attendance: 800; Referees: Brgulian (MNE), Stavridis (GRE)

July 18, 2011; 22:55	Match 7	Italy	17–1	South Africa	Shanghai Oriental Sports Center, Shanghai; Attendance: 450; Referees: Balfanvayev (KAZ), Menedez (CUB)
July 18, 2011; 22:55	Match 7	Score by quarters: 5–0, 3–0, 5–0, 4–1			Shanghai Oriental Sports Center, Shanghai; Attendance: 450; Referees: Balfanvayev (KAZ), Menedez (CUB)
July 18, 2011; 22:55	Match 7	Deserti 4	Goals	Kyte 1	Shanghai Oriental Sports Center, Shanghai; Attendance: 450; Referees: Balfanvayev (KAZ), Menedez (CUB)

July 20, 2011; 12:30	Match 12	South Africa	8–16	Germany	Shanghai Oriental Sports Center, Shanghai; Attendance: 500; Referees: Ciric (SRB), Alexandrescu (ROU)
July 20, 2011; 12:30	Match 12	Score by quarters: 2–3, 2–4, 1–4, 3–5			Shanghai Oriental Sports Center, Shanghai; Attendance: 500; Referees: Ciric (SRB), Alexandrescu (ROU)
July 20, 2011; 12:30	Match 12	Kyte, Bell 3	Goals	Oeler 6	Shanghai Oriental Sports Center, Shanghai; Attendance: 500; Referees: Ciric (SRB), Alexandrescu (ROU)

July 20, 2011; 17:00	Match 13	United States	5–8	Italy	Shanghai Oriental Sports Center, Shanghai; Attendance: 650; Referees: Margeta (SLO), Tulga (TUR)
July 20, 2011; 17:00	Match 13	Score by quarters: 1–2, 1–2, 1–3, 2–1			Shanghai Oriental Sports Center, Shanghai; Attendance: 650; Referees: Margeta (SLO), Tulga (TUR)
July 20, 2011; 17:00	Match 13	Alexander 2	Goals	Gitto, Felugo 2	Shanghai Oriental Sports Center, Shanghai; Attendance: 650; Referees: Margeta (SLO), Tulga (TUR)

July 22, 2011; 13:35	Match 19	United States	20–3	South Africa	Shanghai Oriental Sports Center, Shanghai; Attendance: 450; Referees: Reemnet (NED), Menendez (CUB)
July 22, 2011; 13:35	Match 19	Score by quarters: 5–0, 4–1, 5–0, 6–2			Shanghai Oriental Sports Center, Shanghai; Attendance: 450; Referees: Reemnet (NED), Menendez (CUB)
July 22, 2011; 13:35	Match 19	Azevedo 5	Goals	three players 1	Shanghai Oriental Sports Center, Shanghai; Attendance: 450; Referees: Reemnet (NED), Menendez (CUB)

July 22, 2011; 14:05	Match 20	Italy	7–6	Germany	Shanghai Oriental Sports Center, Shanghai; Attendance: 600; Referees: Borrell (ESP), Stavridis (GRE)
July 22, 2011; 14:05	Match 20	Score by quarters: 2–3, 1–2, 2–1, 2–0			Shanghai Oriental Sports Center, Shanghai; Attendance: 600; Referees: Borrell (ESP), Stavridis (GRE)
July 22, 2011; 14:05	Match 20	Aicardi 3	Goals	Real, Ploitze 2	Shanghai Oriental Sports Center, Shanghai; Attendance: 600; Referees: Borrell (ESP), Stavridis (GRE)

== Knockout stage ==
Championship bracket

Playoffs; 24 July 2011
Canada	4
United States	17
Japan	6
Germany	8
Montenegro	8
Romania	4
Spain	9
Australia	8

Quarterfinals; 26 July 2011
Hungary	9
United States	8
Serbia	9
Germany	4
Croatia	9
Montenegro	6
Italy	10
Spain	6

Semifinals; 28 July 2011
Hungary	14
Serbia	15
Croatia	8
Italy	9

Final; 30 July 2011
Serbia	7
Italy	8
Third place
Hungary	11
Croatia	12

=== Playoff round ===
The group winners have a bye into the quarterfinals.

July 24, 2011; 12:55	Match 27	Montenegro	8–4	Romania	Shanghai Oriental Sports Center, Shanghai; Attendance: 600; Referees: Tulga (TUR), Koganov (AZE)
July 24, 2011; 12:55	Match 27	Score by quarters: 2–1, 1–2, 3–0, 2–1			Shanghai Oriental Sports Center, Shanghai; Attendance: 600; Referees: Tulga (TUR), Koganov (AZE)
July 24, 2011; 12:55	Match 27	Brguljan, Jokic 2	Goals	Radu 2	Shanghai Oriental Sports Center, Shanghai; Attendance: 600; Referees: Tulga (TUR), Koganov (AZE)

July 24, 2011; 15:30	Match 28	Spain	9–8	Australia	Shanghai Oriental Sports Center, Shanghai; Attendance: 750; Referees: Brgulian (MNE), Rotsart (USA)
July 24, 2011; 15:30	Match 28	Score by quarters: 2–1, 3–1, 3–4, 1–2			Shanghai Oriental Sports Center, Shanghai; Attendance: 750; Referees: Brgulian (MNE), Rotsart (USA)
July 24, 2011; 15:30	Match 28	Perrone, García 3	Goals	three players 2	Shanghai Oriental Sports Center, Shanghai; Attendance: 750; Referees: Brgulian (MNE), Rotsart (USA)

July 24, 2011; 11:55	Match 29	Canada	4–17	United States	Shanghai Oriental Sports Center, Shanghai; Attendance: 800; Referees: Ciric (SRB), Korzyna (POL)
July 24, 2011; 11:55	Match 29	Score by quarters: 2–5, 0–6, 2–4, 0–2			Shanghai Oriental Sports Center, Shanghai; Attendance: 800; Referees: Ciric (SRB), Korzyna (POL)
July 24, 2011; 11:55	Match 29	Diggle 2	Goals	four players 3	Shanghai Oriental Sports Center, Shanghai; Attendance: 800; Referees: Ciric (SRB), Korzyna (POL)

July 24, 2011; 21:00	Match 30	Japan	6–8	Germany	Shanghai Oriental Sports Center, Shanghai; Attendance: 550; Referees: Peris (CRO), Cabral (BRA)
July 24, 2011; 21:00	Match 30	Score by quarters: 3–3, 0–1, 2–3, 1–1			Shanghai Oriental Sports Center, Shanghai; Attendance: 550; Referees: Peris (CRO), Cabral (BRA)
July 24, 2011; 21:00	Match 30	Shimizu 4	Goals	Stamm 3	Shanghai Oriental Sports Center, Shanghai; Attendance: 550; Referees: Peris (CRO), Cabral (BRA)

=== Quarterfinals ===
July 26, 2011; 14:00	Match 35	Hungary	9–8	United States	Shanghai Oriental Sports Center, Shanghai; Attendance: 450; Referees: Koryzna (POL), Flahive (AUS)
July 26, 2011; 14:00	Match 35	Score by quarters: 1–3, 3–2, 3–2, 2–1			Shanghai Oriental Sports Center, Shanghai; Attendance: 450; Referees: Koryzna (POL), Flahive (AUS)
July 26, 2011; 14:00	Match 35	three players 2	Goals	Varellas, Bailey 3	Shanghai Oriental Sports Center, Shanghai; Attendance: 450; Referees: Koryzna (POL), Flahive (AUS)

July 26, 2011; 15:45	Match 36	Serbia	9–4	Germany	Shanghai Oriental Sports Center, Shanghai; Attendance: 500; Referees: Koganov (AZE), Alexandrescu (ROU)
July 26, 2011; 15:45	Match 36	Score by quarters: 2–0, 0–1, 4–3, 3–0			Shanghai Oriental Sports Center, Shanghai; Attendance: 500; Referees: Koganov (AZE), Alexandrescu (ROU)
July 26, 2011; 15:45	Match 36	Filipović 4	Goals	four players 1	Shanghai Oriental Sports Center, Shanghai; Attendance: 500; Referees: Koganov (AZE), Alexandrescu (ROU)

July 26, 2011; 16:45	Match 37	Croatia	9–6	Montenegro	Shanghai Oriental Sports Center, Shanghai; Attendance: 350; Referees: Tulga (TUR), Stavridis (GRE)
July 26, 2011; 16:45	Match 37	Score by quarters: 2–2, 2–1, 4–0, 1–3			Shanghai Oriental Sports Center, Shanghai; Attendance: 350; Referees: Tulga (TUR), Stavridis (GRE)
July 26, 2011; 16:45	Match 37	Joković 4	Goals	Radović 2	Shanghai Oriental Sports Center, Shanghai; Attendance: 350; Referees: Tulga (TUR), Stavridis (GRE)

July 26, 2011; 21:00	Match 38	Italy	10–6	Spain	Shanghai Oriental Sports Center, Shanghai; Attendance: 650; Referees: Margeta (SLO), Naumov (RUS)
July 26, 2011; 21:00	Match 38	Score by quarters: 2–1, 3–3, 3–1, 2–1			Shanghai Oriental Sports Center, Shanghai; Attendance: 650; Referees: Margeta (SLO), Naumov (RUS)
July 26, 2011; 21:00	Match 38	Figlioli 4	Goals	six players 1	Shanghai Oriental Sports Center, Shanghai; Attendance: 650; Referees: Margeta (SLO), Naumov (RUS)

=== Semifinals ===
July 28, 2011; 16:15	Match 43	Hungary	14–15 (OT)	Serbia	Shanghai Oriental Sports Center, Shanghai; Attendance: 1,200; Referees: Margeta (SLO), Stavridis (GRE)
July 28, 2011; 16:15	Match 43	Score by quarters: 2–1, 7–5, 3–3, 1–4 OT: 1–2			Shanghai Oriental Sports Center, Shanghai; Attendance: 1,200; Referees: Margeta (SLO), Stavridis (GRE)
July 28, 2011; 16:15	Match 43	Madaras 4	Goals	Filipović, Prlainović 3	Shanghai Oriental Sports Center, Shanghai; Attendance: 1,200; Referees: Margeta (SLO), Stavridis (GRE)

July 28, 2011; 21:00	Match 44	Croatia	8–9	Italy	Shanghai Oriental Sports Center, Shanghai; Attendance: 1,200; Referees: Borrell (ESP), Koganov (AZE)
July 28, 2011; 21:00	Match 44	Score by quarters: 0–1, 1–2, 3–5, 4–1			Shanghai Oriental Sports Center, Shanghai; Attendance: 1,200; Referees: Borrell (ESP), Koganov (AZE)
July 28, 2011; 21:00	Match 44	Bošković 3	Goals	Giorgetti 3	Shanghai Oriental Sports Center, Shanghai; Attendance: 1,200; Referees: Borrell (ESP), Koganov (AZE)

=== Bronze medal game ===
July 30, 2011; 16:00	Match 47	Hungary	11–12	Croatia	Shanghai Oriental Sports Center, Shanghai; Attendance: 1,200; Referees: Borrell (ESP), Stavridis (GRE)
July 30, 2011; 16:00	Match 47	Score by quarters: 2–5, 2–3, 5–3, 2–1			Shanghai Oriental Sports Center, Shanghai; Attendance: 1,200; Referees: Borrell (ESP), Stavridis (GRE)
July 30, 2011; 16:00	Match 47	Varga, Biros 3	Goals	Bošković 4	Shanghai Oriental Sports Center, Shanghai; Attendance: 1,200; Referees: Borrell (ESP), Stavridis (GRE)

=== Final ===
July 30, 2011; 21:00	Match 48	Serbia	7–8 (OT)	Italy	Shanghai Oriental Sports Center, Shanghai; Attendance: 2,000; Referees: Tulga (TUR), Koganov (AZE)
July 30, 2011; 21:00	Match 48	Score by quarters: 0–1, 2–0, 1–4, 3–1 OT: 1–2			Shanghai Oriental Sports Center, Shanghai; Attendance: 2,000; Referees: Tulga (TUR), Koganov (AZE)
July 30, 2011; 21:00	Match 48	Filipović 3	Goals	Aicardi 3	Shanghai Oriental Sports Center, Shanghai; Attendance: 2,000; Referees: Tulga (TUR), Koganov (AZE)

== Classification 5–8 bracket ==
Semi-finals
July 28
United States	9
Germany	8
July 28
Montenegro	9
Spain	10

Fifth place
July 30
United States	10
Spain	11
Seventh place
July 30
Germany	5
Montenegro	8

July 28, 2011; 12:15	Match 41	United States	9–8	Germany	Shanghai Oriental Sports Center, Shanghai; Attendance: 350; Referees: Caputi (ITA), Menendez (CUB)
July 28, 2011; 12:15	Match 41	Score by quarters: 4–2, 4–2, 0–2, 1–2			Shanghai Oriental Sports Center, Shanghai; Attendance: 350; Referees: Caputi (ITA), Menendez (CUB)
July 28, 2011; 12:15	Match 41	Bailey 2	Goals	Kreuzmann, Oeler 2	Shanghai Oriental Sports Center, Shanghai; Attendance: 350; Referees: Caputi (ITA), Menendez (CUB)

July 28, 2011; 15:30	Match 42	Montenegro	9–10	Spain	Shanghai Oriental Sports Center, Shanghai; Attendance: 1,100; Referees: Alexandrescu (ROU), Naumov (RUS)
July 28, 2011; 15:30	Match 42	Score by quarters: 2–2, 3–5, 2–1, 2–2			Shanghai Oriental Sports Center, Shanghai; Attendance: 1,100; Referees: Alexandrescu (ROU), Naumov (RUS)
July 28, 2011; 15:30	Match 42	Radović 3	Goals	Vallès 3	Shanghai Oriental Sports Center, Shanghai; Attendance: 1,100; Referees: Alexandrescu (ROU), Naumov (RUS)

=== 7th place game ===
July 30, 2011; 09:30	Match 45	Germany	5–8	Montenegro	Shanghai Oriental Sports Center, Shanghai; Attendance: 350; Referees: Alexandrescu (ROU), Ni (CHN)
July 30, 2011; 09:30	Match 45	Score by quarters: 3–4, 1–3, 1–1, 0–0			Shanghai Oriental Sports Center, Shanghai; Attendance: 350; Referees: Alexandrescu (ROU), Ni (CHN)
July 30, 2011; 09:30	Match 45	Real, Schüler 2	Goals	Radović, Brguljan 2	Shanghai Oriental Sports Center, Shanghai; Attendance: 350; Referees: Alexandrescu (ROU), Ni (CHN)

=== 5th place game ===
July 30, 2011; 10:15	Match 46	United States	10–11	Spain	Shanghai Oriental Sports Center, Shanghai; Attendance: 350; Referees: Ciric (SRB), Flahive (AUS)
July 30, 2011; 10:15	Match 46	Score by quarters: 0-4, 3-2, 3-2, 4-3			Shanghai Oriental Sports Center, Shanghai; Attendance: 350; Referees: Ciric (SRB), Flahive (AUS)
July 30, 2011; 10:15	Match 46	Varellas 3	Goals	Molina Rios, Perez Vargas 3	Shanghai Oriental Sports Center, Shanghai; Attendance: 350; Referees: Ciric (SRB), Flahive (AUS)

== Classification 9–12 bracket ==
Semi-finals
July 26
Romania	8
Canada	12
July 26
Australia	15
Japan	9

Ninth place
July 28
Canada	6
Australia	8
Eleventh place
July 28
Romania	15
Japan	18

July 26, 2011; 11:30	Match 33	Romania	8–12	Canada	Shanghai Oriental Sports Center, Shanghai; Attendance: 350; Referees: Peris (CRO), Williams (NZL)
July 26, 2011; 11:30	Match 33	Score by quarters: 2–2, 2–4, 3–3, 1–3			Shanghai Oriental Sports Center, Shanghai; Attendance: 350; Referees: Peris (CRO), Williams (NZL)
July 26, 2011; 11:30	Match 33	Radu, Negrean 3	Goals	Boyd 4	Shanghai Oriental Sports Center, Shanghai; Attendance: 350; Referees: Peris (CRO), Williams (NZL)

July 26, 2011; 12:40	Match 34	Australia	15–9	Japan	Shanghai Oriental Sports Center, Shanghai; Referees: Ciric (SRB), Ni (CHN)
July 26, 2011; 12:40	Match 34	Score by quarters: 6–4, 1–1, 3–1, 5–3			Shanghai Oriental Sports Center, Shanghai; Referees: Ciric (SRB), Ni (CHN)
July 26, 2011; 12:40	Match 34	three players 3	Goals	Takei 3	Shanghai Oriental Sports Center, Shanghai; Referees: Ciric (SRB), Ni (CHN)

=== 11th place game ===
July 28, 2011; 09:30	Match 39	Romania	15–18	Japan	Shanghai Oriental Sports Center, Shanghai; Attendance: 200; Referees: Reemnet (NED), Bock (GER)
July 28, 2011; 09:30	Match 39	Score by quarters: 4–3, 3–5, 3–5, 5–5			Shanghai Oriental Sports Center, Shanghai; Attendance: 200; Referees: Reemnet (NED), Bock (GER)
July 28, 2011; 09:30	Match 39	Kadar 4	Goals	Shiota 8	Shanghai Oriental Sports Center, Shanghai; Attendance: 200; Referees: Reemnet (NED), Bock (GER)

=== 9th place game ===
July 28, 2011; 10:45	Match 40	Canada	6–8	Australia	Shanghai Oriental Sports Center, Shanghai; Attendance: 300; Referees: Brgulian (MNE), Ni (CHN)
July 28, 2011; 10:45	Match 40	Score by quarters: 2–0, 1–2, 2–3, 1–3			Shanghai Oriental Sports Center, Shanghai; Attendance: 300; Referees: Brgulian (MNE), Ni (CHN)
July 28, 2011; 10:45	Match 40	Graham 3	Goals	Younger 2	Shanghai Oriental Sports Center, Shanghai; Attendance: 300; Referees: Brgulian (MNE), Ni (CHN)

== Classification 13–16 bracket ==
Semi-finals
July 24
Kazakhstan	8
China	7
July 24
Brazil	7
South Africa	4

Thirteenth place
July 26
Kazakhstan	9
Brazil	7
Fifteenth place
July 26
China	9
South Africa	4

July 24, 2011; 09:30	Match 25	Kazakhstan	8–7	China	Shanghai Oriental Sports Center, Shanghai; Attendance: 1,000; Referees: Alexandrescu (ROU), Williams (NZL)
July 24, 2011; 09:30	Match 25	Score by quarters: 2–2, 3–2, 2–0, 1–3			Shanghai Oriental Sports Center, Shanghai; Attendance: 1,000; Referees: Alexandrescu (ROU), Williams (NZL)
July 24, 2011; 09:30	Match 25	Pilipenko, Panfili 2	Goals	Liang, Xie 2	Shanghai Oriental Sports Center, Shanghai; Attendance: 1,000; Referees: Alexandrescu (ROU), Williams (NZL)

July 24, 2011; 10:45	Match 26	Brazil	7–4	South Africa	Shanghai Oriental Sports Center, Shanghai; Attendance: 700; Referees: Juhaz (HUN), Rustamova (UZB)
July 24, 2011; 10:45	Match 26	Score by quarters: 4–0, 0–1, 1–2, 2–1			Shanghai Oriental Sports Center, Shanghai; Attendance: 700; Referees: Juhaz (HUN), Rustamova (UZB)
July 24, 2011; 10:45	Match 26	Franco 2	Goals	Manson 2	Shanghai Oriental Sports Center, Shanghai; Attendance: 700; Referees: Juhaz (HUN), Rustamova (UZB)

=== 15th place game ===
July 26, 2011; 03:45	Match 31	China	9–4	South Africa	Shanghai Oriental Sports Center, Shanghai; Attendance: 250; Referees: Menendez (CUB), Cabral (BRA)
July 26, 2011; 03:45	Match 31	Score by quarters: 3–1, 2–2, 2–0, 2–1			Shanghai Oriental Sports Center, Shanghai; Attendance: 250; Referees: Menendez (CUB), Cabral (BRA)
July 26, 2011; 03:45	Match 31	Yu Lijun, Li Bin 2	Goals	Bell 2	Shanghai Oriental Sports Center, Shanghai; Attendance: 250; Referees: Menendez (CUB), Cabral (BRA)

=== 13th place game ===
July 26, 2011; 10:00	Match 32	Kazakhstan	9–7	Brazil	Shanghai Oriental Sports Center, Shanghai; Attendance: 250; Referees: Pinker (RSA), Makita (JPN)
July 26, 2011; 10:00	Match 32	Score by quarters: 3–0, 1–3, 2–2, 3–2			Shanghai Oriental Sports Center, Shanghai; Attendance: 250; Referees: Pinker (RSA), Makita (JPN)
July 26, 2011; 10:00	Match 32	Zhilyayev 3	Goals	Silva 2	Shanghai Oriental Sports Center, Shanghai; Attendance: 250; Referees: Pinker (RSA), Makita (JPN)

== Final ranking ==
Qualified for the 2012 Olympic Games
Qualified for the 2012 Olympic Games as winner of the 2011 World League

Rank	Team
1st place, gold medalist(s)	Italy
2nd place, silver medalist(s)	Serbia
3rd place, bronze medalist(s)	Croatia
4	Hungary
5	Spain
6	United States
7	Montenegro
8	Germany
9	Australia
10	Canada
11	Japan
12	Romania
13	Kazakhstan
14	Brazil
15	China
16	South Africa

2011 FINA Men's World champions

Italy
Third title

Team Roster

Stefano Tempesti, Amaurys Perez, Niccolo Gitto, Pietro Figlioli, Alex Giorgetti, Maurizio Felugo, Niccolo Figari, Valentino Gallo, Christian Presciutti, Deni Fiorentini, Matteo Aicardi, Arnaldo Deserti, Giacomo Pastorino
Head coach: Sandro Campagna

== Medalists ==
Gold	Silver	Bronze
Italy Stefano Tempesti (c); Amaurys Perez; Niccolo Gitto; Pietro Figlioli; Alex Giorgetti; Maurizio Felugo; Niccolo Figari; Valentino Gallo; Christian Presciutti; Deni Fiorentini; Matteo Aicardi; Arnaldo Deserti; Giacomo Pastorino Head coach: Sandro Campagna	Serbia Slobodan Soro; Marko Avramović; Živko Gocić; Vanja Udovičić (c); Miloš Ćuk; Duško Pijetlović; Slobodan Nikić; Milan Aleksić; Nikola Rađen; Filip Filipović; Andrija Prlainović; Stefan Mitrović; Gojko Pijetlović Head coach: Dejan Udovičić	Croatia Josip Pavić; Damir Burić; Miho Bošković; Nikša Dobud; Maro Joković; Petar Muslim; Frano Karač; Andro Bušlje; Sandro Sukno; Samir Barač (c); Fran Paskvalin; Paulo Obradović; Ivan Buljubašić Head coach: Ratko Rudić

== Individual awards ==
- Most Valuable Player

- Filip Filipović (SRB)

- Best Goalkeeper

- Stefano Tempesti (ITA)

- Topscorer

- Cosmin Radu (ROU) — 20 goals
