= Aidan Roach =

Australian water polo player

Personal information
- Full name: Aidan Joseph Roach
- Nationality: Australian
- Born: 7 September 1990 (age 36) Darlinghurst, New South Wales, Australia
- Height: 1.86 m (6 ft 1 in)
- Weight: 88 kg (194 lb)

Sport
- Sport: Water polo
- Handedness: right
National team
- Years: Team
- 2011: Australia

Aidan Joseph "AJ" Roach (born 7 September 1990 in Darlinghurst) is an Australian male water polo player. At the 2012 and 2016 Summer Olympics, he competed for the Australia men's national water polo team in the men's event. He also competed at the 2011 World Aquatics Championships.

Roach was picked in the water polo Sharks squad to compete in the men's water polo tournament at the 2020 Summer Olympics. The team finished joint fourth on points in their pool but their inferior goal average meant they finished fifth overall and out of medal contention. They were able to upset Croatia in a group stage match 11–8.

He is the son of former professional rugby league footballer Steve Roach.
