= Tim Cleland =

Australian male former water polo player

Personal information
- Full name: Timothy Cleland
- Nationality: Australian
- Born: 15 December 1984 (age 41)
- Height: 1.95 m (6 ft 5 in)
- Weight: 115 kg (254 lb)

Sport
- Sport: Water polo
- Handedness: Right
- Number: 3
National team
- Years: Team
- 2011: Australia

Timothy Cleland (born 15 December 1984) is an Australian male former water polo player. He was part of the Australia men's national water polo team. At the 2012 Summer Olympics, he competed for the Australia men's national water polo team in the men's event. He competed also at the 2011 World Aquatics Championships.
