= Manthos Voulgarakis =

Greek water polo player

Matthaios Voulgarakis
Personal information
- Nationality: Greek
- Born: 14 March 1980 (age 46)
- Height: 1.87 m (6 ft 2 in)
- Weight: 103 kg (227 lb)

Sport
- Sport: Water polo
- Handedness: Right
National team
- Years: Team
- ?-?: Greece
Medal record
Men's water polo
Representing Greece
World Championships
Bronze medal – third place	2005 Montreal	Team competition

Matthaios "Manthos" Voulgarakis (Greek: Ματθαιος "Μανθος" Βουλγαρακης, born 14 March 1980 in Chania) is a Greek water polo player. At the 2012 Summer Olympics, he competed for the Greece men's national water polo team in the men's event. He is 6 feet 2 inches (1.88 m) tall.

== See also ==
- List of World Aquatics Championships medalists in water polo
