= Andrei Bușilă =

Romanian water polo player

Personal information
- Born: 10 November 1980 (age 44); Bucharest, Romania

Sport
- Sport: Water polo

Andrei Bușilă (born 10 November 1980) is a Romanian water polo player. At the 2012 Summer Olympics, he competed for the Romania men's national water polo team in the men's event.
