= Budvanska Rivijera =

Montenegrin major hotel group

HG Budvanska Rivijera
- Industry: Hospitality
- Founded: 1990; 36 years ago
- Headquarters: Trg slobode 1, Budva, Montenegro
- Key people: Mijomir Pejovic (Chairman of the Board of Directors), Jovan Gregovic (Executive Director)
- Services: Hotels
- Website: www.hgbudvanskarivijera.com

Budvanska Rivijera (Montenegrin: [budvaŋska rivijêːra]) is a Montenegrin hotel group. It operates with hotels within the Municipality of Budva in Montenegro.

== History ==
Hotel group ”Budvanska Rivijera” is the largest hotel group in Montenegro. It operates 5 hotels in the most attractive locations in Budva: Hotel "Mogren", Hotel resort "Slovenska plaža", Hotel "Aleksandar" and in Petrovac: Hotel "Palas" with its depandance Hotel Palas Lux and Hotel "Castellastva".

For many years, this hotel group has been recognized as a company that continuously invests in new quality, which results in a constant increase in the number of satisfied guests. Following the world trends of sustainable development in tourism, HG Budvanska Rivijera introduced an integrated management system by uniting three international ISO standards, namely in the field of quality management (ISO 9001), environmental protection management (ISO 14000) and food safety management (ISO 22000).

The hotel group is also the holder of the Travelife Gold Certificate - an international mark of quality in the field of respect for ecological and social principles, which all together shows that the company is dedicated to achieving high client and employee satisfaction, reducing operating costs and respecting the principles of sustainable tourism, which increasingly takes primacy in business.

A long and rich tradition of over 50 years of business, the attractiveness of the hotel facilities and their contents, hospitality, reliability, a combination of tradition and innovative facilities, as well as care for guests, are the reasons why we continue to attract new tourists, and regular guests return to us again and again.

== Hotels ==
- Hotel Aleksandar - Budva - located near the beach, away from the crowd, Hotel Aleksandar is a family hotel that has been welcoming guests to Budva since 1989. The complex is the jewel in the crown of the "Budvanska Rivijera" hotel group. The hotel consists of 4 separate villas, which were named after plants: Lavender, Hydrangea, Pinea and Tilia. The names of the villas personify the rich greenery of the hotel, as well as the Mediterranean charm that surrounds the villas. The exceptional location, with only a few meters of walking distance to the city's longest beach, allows our guests to move from one oasis to another.
- Slovenska Plaža Tourist Complex - Budva - located in an authentic Mediterranean environment and is one of the oldest buildings in Budva. It is characterized by its romantic appearance - sloping roofs, symmetrical design, outdoor balconies and terraces that amaze guests. This family nest is composed of 10 individual villas, enriched with recognizable Mediterranean plants, named after special types of Mediterranean plants - Cypress, Myrtle, Magnolia, Canna, Palm, Camellia, Lemon, Oleander, Rosemary and Olive. The resort brings together everything you need for a vacation: public parking, restaurants, cafes, boutiques, galleries, travel agencies, dental and ambulatory care centers, beauty salons, and much more.
- Hotel Palas - Petrovac - Four star rated resort hotel Palas is situated in Petrovac, a small coastal settlement embraced by rugged hills, mild Mediterranean climate, beaches that combine sand and pebble, and hospitable locals. The hotel itself is centrally located, encircled by orange and olive trees in a cove on the Petrovac Bay, with a view on two islands; Katic and Sveta Nedjelja. The landmarks of this small town make it the right fit for families, senior citizens, couples, and all who seek an idyllic environment for vacations.
- Hotel Palas Lux - Petrovac - the Palace Hotel depandance is located in one of the most attractive locations in Petrovac. It exudes a contemporary interior and high-quality accommodation capacities. The hotel has 32 double rooms and 16 deluxe apartments, of which 8 apartments have beautiful sea views. Within the hotel, there is a reception and a restaurant that functions as the City Tavern Palas. For now, the available service is bed and breakfast. Other services, sports, and recreational facilities can be used by guests at the Palas Hotel.
- Hotel Castellastva - Petrovac - located in the center of Petrovac, a small seaside town with a natural setting among pine trees and olive groves. Just a 150m walk from the seashore, Hotel Castellastva is an ideal place for families or elderly guests looking for a relaxing holiday. The name of the hotel comes from the Italian word "castellastua", which was a Venetian fortress built in the 16th century, which means "Petrovac on the sea", and thus preserves and reminds the tradition of the town's tourist development. It exudes warmth and comfort, making it perfect for tourists who want a peaceful vacation.
- Hotel Mogren - Budva - currently being renovated into a 5-star hotel with a plethora of luxury content and services.
