= Rafael Aguilar (water polo) =

Spanish water polo player (born 1961)

Personal information
- Born: 27 December 1961 (age 64) Terrassa, Spain
- Height: 1.78 m (5 ft 10 in)
- Weight: 74 kg (163 lb)

Sport
- Sport: Water polo
Medal record
Representing Spain
European Championships
Bronze medal – third place	1983 Rome	Team competition

Rafael Aguilar Morillo (born 27 December 1961) is a Spanish water polo player. He competed in the 1984 Summer Olympics.
