= Iván Gallego =

Spanish water polo player (born 1984)

Personal information
- Born: 13 February 1984 (age 42) Terrassa, Spain

Sport
- Sport: Water polo
Medal record
Representing Spain
World Championships
Silver medal – second place	2009 Rome	Team competition
Bronze medal – third place	2007 Melbourne	Team competition
Mediterranean Games
Silver medal – second place	2009 Pescara	Team competition

Iván Gallego (born 13 February 1984) is a Spanish water polo player who competed in the 2008 Summer Olympics.

== See also ==
- List of World Aquatics Championships medalists in water polo
