= Devon Diggle =

Canadian water polo player (born 1988)

Personal information
- Born: 15 June 1988 (age 38) Montreal, Quebec, Canada
- Height: 183 cm (6 ft 0 in)
- Weight: 83 kg (183 lb)

Sport
- Country: Canada
- Sport: Water Polo
- Club: Dollard-des-Ormeaux
Medal record
Representing Canada
Pan American Games
| Silver medal – second place | 2011 Guadalajara | Team competition |
- Updated on 10 May 2024

Devon Diggle (born 15 June 1988) is a male former water polo player from Canada. He joined the senior Canadian national team in 2007. He was part of the Canadian team at the 2008 Summer Olympics. He also competed at the 2013 World Aquatics Championships in Barcelona, Spain, where they finished in 11th place. He played for Dollard-des-Ormeaux. He trained at the Talisman Centre in Calgary.

He studied at the University of Calgary.

== Results ==
2010

- 5th place at Syracusa Invitational in Sicily, Italy

2009

- 8th place at World Championships in Rome

2008

- 11th place in the Beijing Olympic Games
- 4th place at the Olympic Qualifications in Romania

2007

- 13th place at the Junior World Championships in Los Angeles.
- 2nd leading scorer in the tournament

World Championship appearances

- 2009 – 8th
- 2013 – 11th

National titles

- 2004 U15
- 2005 U18, U22
- 2006 U22
- 2008 U22, senior
- 2009 Senior
- 2010 Senior

Awards

- 3 times national championship Most Valuable Player
- 7 times All-Star
- 2 time Montreal Amateur Athlete of the Week.

== See also ==
- Canada at the 2013 World Aquatics Championships
