= Fabian Schrödter =

German water polo player

Fabian Schroedter
Personal information
- Nationality: German
- Born: 11 September 1982 (age 44) Berlin
- Height: 2.07 m (6 ft 9 in)
- Weight: 107 kg (236 lb)

Sport
- Sport: Water polo
- Handedness: right
- Number: 3

Senior clubs
- Years: Team
- ?-?: Wasserfreunde Spandau 04
National team
- Years: Team
- ?-?: Germany

Fabian Schroedter (born 11 September 1982) is a German male former water polo player. He was part of the Germany men's national water polo team. He was a part of the team at the 2004 Summer Olympics. He competed at world championships, including at the 2011 World Aquatics Championships. On club level he played for Wasserfreunde Spandau 04 in Germany.
