= Ramiro Georgescu =

Romanian water polo player

Personal information
- Born: 27 November 1982 (age 42); Oradea, Romania

Sport
- Sport: Water polo

Ramiro Georgescu (born 27 November 1982) is a Romanian water polo player. At the 2012 Summer Olympics, he competed for the Romania men's national water polo team in the men's event. He is 6 ft 4 inches tall.
