= Zdravko Radić =

Montenegrin water polo player (born 1979)

Personal information
- Born: 24 June 1979 (age 47) Kotor, Yugoslavia

Sport
- Sport: Water polo
Medal record
Representing Serbia and Montenegro
World Championship
Gold medal – first place	2005 Montreal	Team competition
Representing Montenegro
World Championships
Silver medal – second place	2013 Barcelona	Team competition
European Championship
Gold medal – first place	2008 Málaga	Team competition
Silver medal – second place	2012 Eindhoven	Team competition

Zdravko Radić (Montenegrin Cyrillic: Здравко Радић; born 24 June 1979) is a Montenegrin water polo player. He was a member of the Montenegro men's national water polo team at the 2008 Summer Olympics.

== See also ==
- Montenegro men's Olympic water polo team records and statistics
- List of men's Olympic water polo tournament goalkeepers
- List of world champions in men's water polo
- List of World Aquatics Championships medalists in water polo
