= Arnaldo Deserti =

Italian former water polo player

Amaldo Deserti
Personal information
- Nationality: Italian
- Born: 18 April 1979 (age 47) Genoa, Italy
- Height: 1.89 m (6 ft 2 in)
- Weight: 100 kg (220 lb)

Sport
- Sport: Water polo
- Handedness: right
- Number: 12
National team
- Years: Team
- 2011: Italy
Medal record
Representing Italy
World Championships
Gold medal – first place	2011 Shanghai	Team competition
World League
Silver medal – second place	2011 Florence	Team competition
European Championships
Silver medal – second place	2010 Zagreb	Team competition

Arnaldo Deserti (born 1 April 1979) is an Italian water polo player.

Born at Genoa, he currently plays for Rari Nantes Bogliasco and the Italian water polo national team.

He won the gold medal at the 2011 FINA World Aquatics Championships in Shanghai.

== See also ==
- List of world champions in men's water polo
- List of World Aquatics Championships medalists in water polo
