= Amaurys Pérez =

Italian water polo player (born 1976)

Amaurys Perez
Personal information
- Born: 18 March 1976 (age 50) Camagüey, Cuba
- Height: 194 cm (6 ft 4 in)
- Weight: 98 kg (216 lb)
Medal record
Men's water polo
Representing Italy
Olympic Games
Silver medal – second place	2012 London	Team
World Championships
Gold medal – first place	2011 Shanghai	Team

Amaurys Perez (born 18 March 1976) is an Italian water polo player. At the 2012 Summer Olympics, he competed for the Italy men's national water polo team in the men's event, winning the silver medal. He is 194 cm (6 feet 4 inches) tall. He considers himself Catholic.

== See also ==
- List of Olympic medalists in water polo (men)
- List of world champions in men's water polo
- List of World Aquatics Championships medalists in water polo
