= Andrei Iosep =

Romanian water polo player

Personal information
- Nationality: Romanian
- Born: 1977 (age 47–48)

Sport
- Sport: Water polo

Andrei Ionut Iosep (born 1977) is a Romanian water polo player. At the 2012 Summer Olympics, he competed for the Romania men's national water polo team in the men's event. He is 6 ft 5 inches tall.
