= Niccolò Figari =

Italian water polo player

Personal information
- Nationality: Italy
- Born: 24 January 1988 (age 38) Genoa, Italy
- Height: 1.98 m (6 ft 6 in)

Sport
- Sport: Water polo
Medal record
Representing Italy
World Championships
Gold medal – first place	2011 Shanghai	Team competition
Gold medal – first place	2019 Gwangju	Team competition
European Championships
Bronze medal – third place	2014 Budapest	Team competition

Niccolò Figari (born 24 January 1988) is an Italian water polo player. He competed in the 2020 Summer Olympics.
