= Mario José García =

Spanish water polo player (born 1983)

Personal information
- Born: 15 July 1983 (age 42) Madrid, Spain

Sport
- Sport: Water polo
Medal record
Representing Spain
World Championships
Silver medal – second place	2009 Rome	Team competition
Bronze medal – third place	2007 Melbourne	Team competition
European Championship
Bronze medal – third place	2006 Belgrade	Team competition

Mario José García Rodriguez (born 15 July 1983) is a Spanish water polo player who competed in the 2008 and 2012 Summer Olympics.

== See also ==
- List of World Aquatics Championships medalists in water polo
