= Antonio Petrović =

Montenegrin water polo player

Personal information
- Born: 24 September 1982 (age 43)
- Height: 193 cm (6 ft 4 in)
- Weight: 98 kg (216 lb)

Sport
- Sport: Water polo
- Club: Primorje Rijeka
Medal record
Representing Montenegro
World Championships
Silver medal – second place	2013 Barcelona	team
European Championship
Silver medal – second place	2012 Eindhoven	team
Silver medal – second place	2016 Belgrade	team

Antonio Petrović (Montenegrin Cyrillic: Антонио Петровић; born 24 September 1982) is a water polo player from Montenegro. He was part of the Montenegrin team at the 2012 and 2016 Summer Olympics.

== See also ==
- List of World Aquatics Championships medalists in water polo
