= Andreas Schlotterbeck =

German water polo player

Personal information
- Born: 2 March 1982 (age 44)

Sport
- Sport: Water polo

Andreas Schlotterbeck (born 2 March 1982) is a German water polo player who competed in the 2008 Summer Olympics.
