= Marko Stamm =

German water polo player

Personal information
- Full name: Marko Yannik Stamm
- Nationality: German
- Born: 30 August 1988 (age 38) West Berlin, West Germany
- Height: 1.86 m (6 ft 1 in)
- Weight: 100 kg (220 lb)

Sport
- Sport: Water polo
- Handedness: Right
- Number: 5
National team
- Years: Team
- 2011: Germany

Marko Yannik Stamm (born 30 August 1988) is a German male former water polo player. He was part of the Germany men's national water polo team at the 2008 Summer Olympics. He also competed at the 2011 World Aquatics Championships.
