= Christian Presciutti =

Italian water polo player (born 1982)

Personal information
- Nationality: Italian
- Born: 27 November 1982 (age 43) Venice, Italy
- Height: 1.84 m (6 ft 0 in)
- Weight: 87 kg (192 lb)

Sport
- Country: Italy
- Sport: Water polo
- Club: AN Brescia
Medal record
Olympic Games
Silver medal – second place	2012 London	Team
Bronze medal – third place	2016 Rio de Janeiro	Team
World Championships
Gold medal – first place	2011 Shanghai	Team

Christian Presciutti (born 27 November 1982) is an Italian water polo player. At the 2012 Summer Olympics, he competed for the Italy men's national water polo team in the men's event, where Italy won the silver medal.

== See also ==
- List of Olympic medalists in water polo (men)
- List of world champions in men's water polo
- List of World Aquatics Championships medalists in water polo
