= Alex Giorgetti =

Italian water polo player

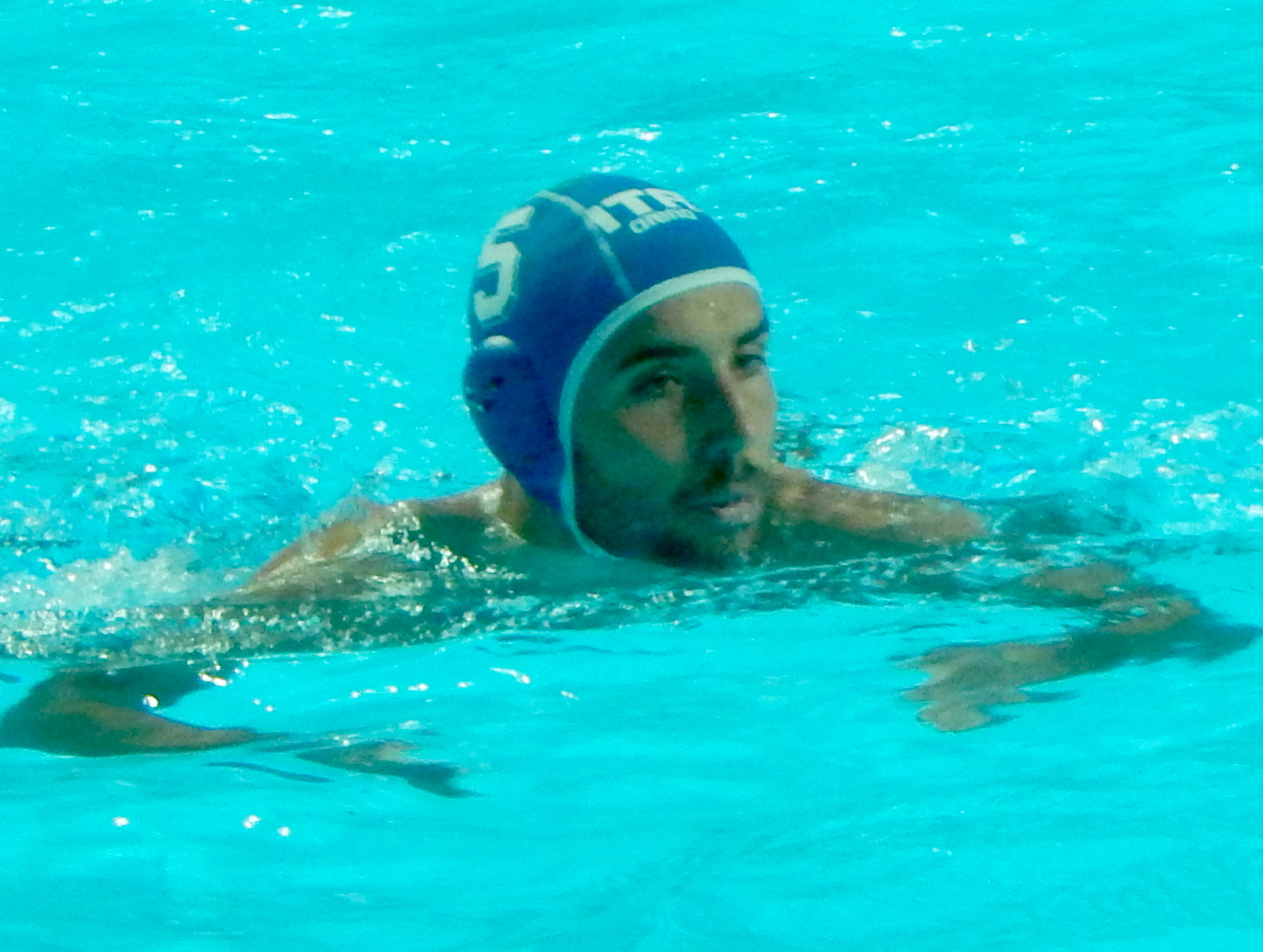
- Giorgetti at the 2015 World Championships

Personal information
- Born: 24 December 1987 (age 38) Budapest, Hungary
- Height: 187 cm (6 ft 2 in)
- Weight: 78 kg (172 lb)

Sport
- Sport: Water polo
- Club: Pro Recco
- Coached by: Giuseppe Porzio (club); Alessandro Campagna (national)
Medal record
Representing Italy
Olympic Games
Silver medal – second place	2012 London	Team
World Championships
Gold medal – first place	2011 Shanghai	Team
European Championships
Bronze medal – third place	2014 Budapest	Team

Alex Giorgetti (born 24 December 1987) is an Italian water polo forward. He won the world title in 2011 and an Olympic silver medal in 2012.

== See also ==
- List of Olympic medalists in water polo (men)
- List of world champions in men's water polo
- List of World Aquatics Championships medalists in water polo
