= Moritz Oeler =

German water polo player

Personal information
- Full name: Moritz Benedikt Oeler
- Nationality: German
- Born: 21 October 1985 (age 40) Neustadt an der Weinstraße, West Germany
- Height: 1.88 m (6 ft 2 in)
- Weight: 84 kg (185 lb)

Sport
- Sport: Water polo
- Handedness: Right
- Number: 10
National team
- Years: Team
- 2011: Germany

Moritz Benedikt Oeler (born 21 October 1985 in Neustadt an der Weinstraße) is a German male former water polo player. He was part of the Germany men's national water polo team in the 2008 Summer Olympics. He also competed at the 2011 World Aquatics Championships.

== See also ==
- Germany men's Olympic water polo team records and statistics
