= Deni Fiorentini =

Croatian-Italian water polo player

Personal information
- Born: 5 June 1984 (age 42) Split, SR Croatia, SFR Yugoslavia
- Height: 6 ft 3 in (1.91 m)
Medal record
Men's water polo
Representing Italy
Olympic Games
Silver medal – second place	2012 London	Team
World Championships
Gold medal – first place	2011 Shanghai	Team

Deni Fiorentini (born 5 June 1984) is a Croatian-Italian water polo player. Until 2006 he was part of Croatia men's national water polo team. He has dual Italian and Croatian citizenship. At the 2012 Summer Olympics, he competed for the Italy men's national water polo team in the men's event. His father Branko Jovanović used to play for POŠK and Yugoslavia men's national water polo team. His brother Goran was also a water polo player. He is 6 feet 3 inches (1.91 m) tall.

== See also ==
- Italy men's Olympic water polo team records and statistics
- List of Olympic medalists in water polo (men)
- List of world champions in men's water polo
- List of World Aquatics Championships medalists in water polo
