= Giacomo Pastorino =

Italian water polo player

Personal information
- Born: 7 June 1980 (age 46) Savona, Italy

Sport
- Sport: Water polo
Medal record
Representing Italy
Olympic Games
Silver medal – second place	2012 London	Team competition
World Championships
Gold medal – first place	2011 Shanghai	Team competition
European Championships
Silver medal – second place	2010 Zagreb	Team competition

Giacomo Pastorino (born 7 June 1980) is an Italian water polo goalkeeper. At the 2012 Summer Olympics, he competed for the Italy men's national water polo team in the men's event, winning the silver medal. He is 6 ft 3 inches tall.

== See also ==
- Italy men's Olympic water polo team records and statistics
- List of Olympic medalists in water polo (men)
- List of men's Olympic water polo tournament goalkeepers
- List of world champions in men's water polo
- List of World Aquatics Championships medalists in water polo
