= Niccolò Gitto =

Italian water polo player

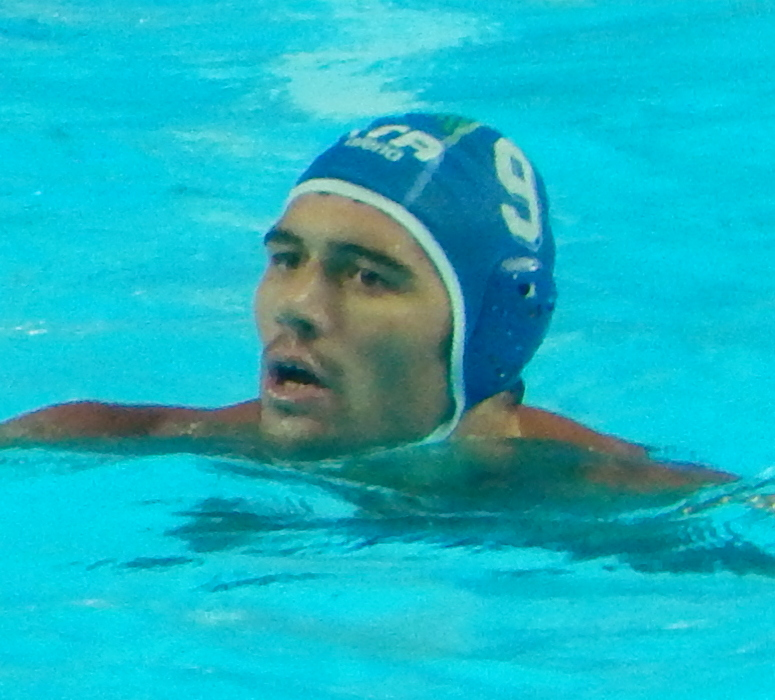
- Gitto at the 2015 World Championships

Personal information
- Nationality: Italian
- Born: 12 October 1986 (age 39) Rome, Italy
- Height: 1.90 m (6 ft 3 in)
- Weight: 90 kg (198 lb)

Sport
- Sport: Water polo
- Club: Pro Recco (2010-)
- Coached by: Ratko Rudic (club); Alessandro Campagna (national)
Medal record
Representing Italy
Olympic Games
| Silver medal – second place | 2012 London | Team |
| Bronze medal – third place | 2016 Rio de Janeiro | Team |
World Championships
| Gold medal – first place | 2011 Shanghai | Team |

Niccolò Gitto (born 12 October 1986) is an Italian water polo player. He won the world title in 2012 and two Olympic medals in 2012 and 2016. In 2012 he received the Gold Collar of Sporting Merit from the Italian Olympic Committee. He is married to Victoria and has a son Leonardo.

== See also ==
- List of Olympic medalists in water polo (men)
- List of world champions in men's water polo
- List of World Aquatics Championships medalists in water polo
