= Kálmán Kádár =

Romanian water polo player

Personal information
- Full name: Kálmán János Kádár
- Born: 11 June 1979 (age 47) Oradea, Romania
- Height: 1.90 m (6 ft 3 in)
- Weight: 94 kg (207 lb)

Sport
- Sport: Water polo
- Handedness: Right
- Number: 12
National team
- Years: Team
- 2001–2012: Romania

Kálmán János Kádár (Hungarian pronunciation: [ˈkaːlmaːn ˈkaːdaːr]; born 11 June 1979) is a Romanian water polo player.

Kádár, who comes from the Hungarian minority in Romania, was part of the Romania men's national water polo team that competed at the 2012 Summer Olympics.
