= Water polo at the 2012 Summer Olympics =

Water polo at the Games of the XXX Olympiad

Tournament details
- Host country: United Kingdom
- City: London
- Venue(s): Water Polo Arena
- Dates: 29 July - 12 August 2012
- Events: 2 (men's, women's)
- Teams: 12 (men's), 8 (women's) (from 4 confederations)
- Competitors: 155 men, 102 women

Final positions
- Champions: Croatia (men); United States (women)
- Runners-up: Italy (men); Spain (women)
- Third place: Serbia (men); Australia (women)
- Fourth place: Montenegro (men); Hungary (women)

Tournament statistics (men, women)
- Matches: 66
- Goals scored: 1,231 (18.65 per match)
- Multiple appearances: 5-time Olympian(s): 3 players 4-time Olympian(s): 17 players
- Multiple medalists: 4-time medalist(s): 2 players 3-time medalist(s): 5 players
- MVPs: (Croatia) Josip Pavić (men's) (United States) Maggie Steffens (women's)

The water polo tournaments at the 2012 Summer Olympics in London, United Kingdom were held at the London 2012 Water Polo Arena in the Olympic Park from 29 July to 12 August. The venue's capacity held 5,000 spectators. Twelve teams competed in the men's tournament and eight teams in the women's tournament.

== Qualification ==
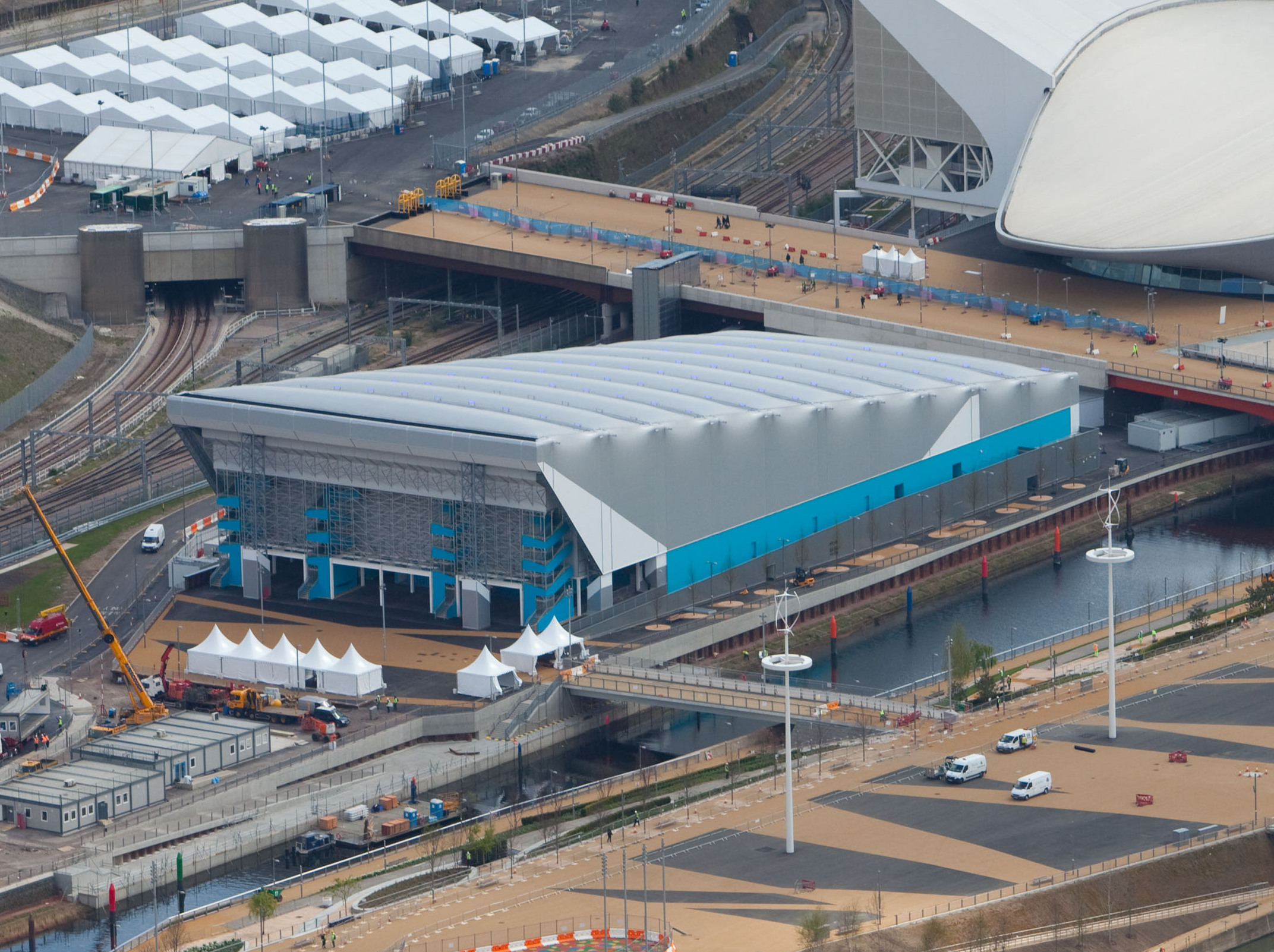
Aerial view of the Water Polo Arena, a temporary venue built for Water Polo competition at the 2012 Summer Olympics.

Both of Great Britain's teams automatically qualified, while the African qualification tournament was cancelled due as no teams entered, increasing the available spots at each final qualification tournament to four.

=== Men ===
Means of qualification	Date	Venue	Number of berths	Nation(s) qualified
Host nation	–	–	1	Great Britain
2011 World League Super-Final	21–26 June 2011	Florence, Italy	1	Serbia
2011 FINA World Championships	16–31 July 2011	Shanghai, China	3	Italy; Croatia; Hungary
2011 Pan American Games	23–29 October 2011	Guadalajara, Mexico	1	United States
2012 Asian Water Polo Championship	23–29 January 2012	Chiba City, Japan	1	Kazakhstan
Oceania	–	–	1	Australia
World Qualification Tournament	1–8 April 2012	Edmonton, Canada	4	Montenegro; Spain; Greece; Romania
Total			12	

=== Women ===
Means of qualification	Date	Venue	Number of berths	Nation(s) qualified
Host nation	–	–	1	Great Britain
2011 Pan American Games	23–28 October 2011	Guadalajara, Mexico	1	United States
2012 Asian Water Polo Championship	23–29 January 2012	Chiba City, Japan	1	China
Oceania	–	–	1	Australia
World Qualification Tournament	15–22 April 2012	Trieste, Italy	4	Spain; Italy; Russia; Hungary
Total			8	

== Draw ==
The draw for the Olympic tournament took place in May 2012. The men were drawn into two groups of six teams, the women were drawn into two groups of four teams.

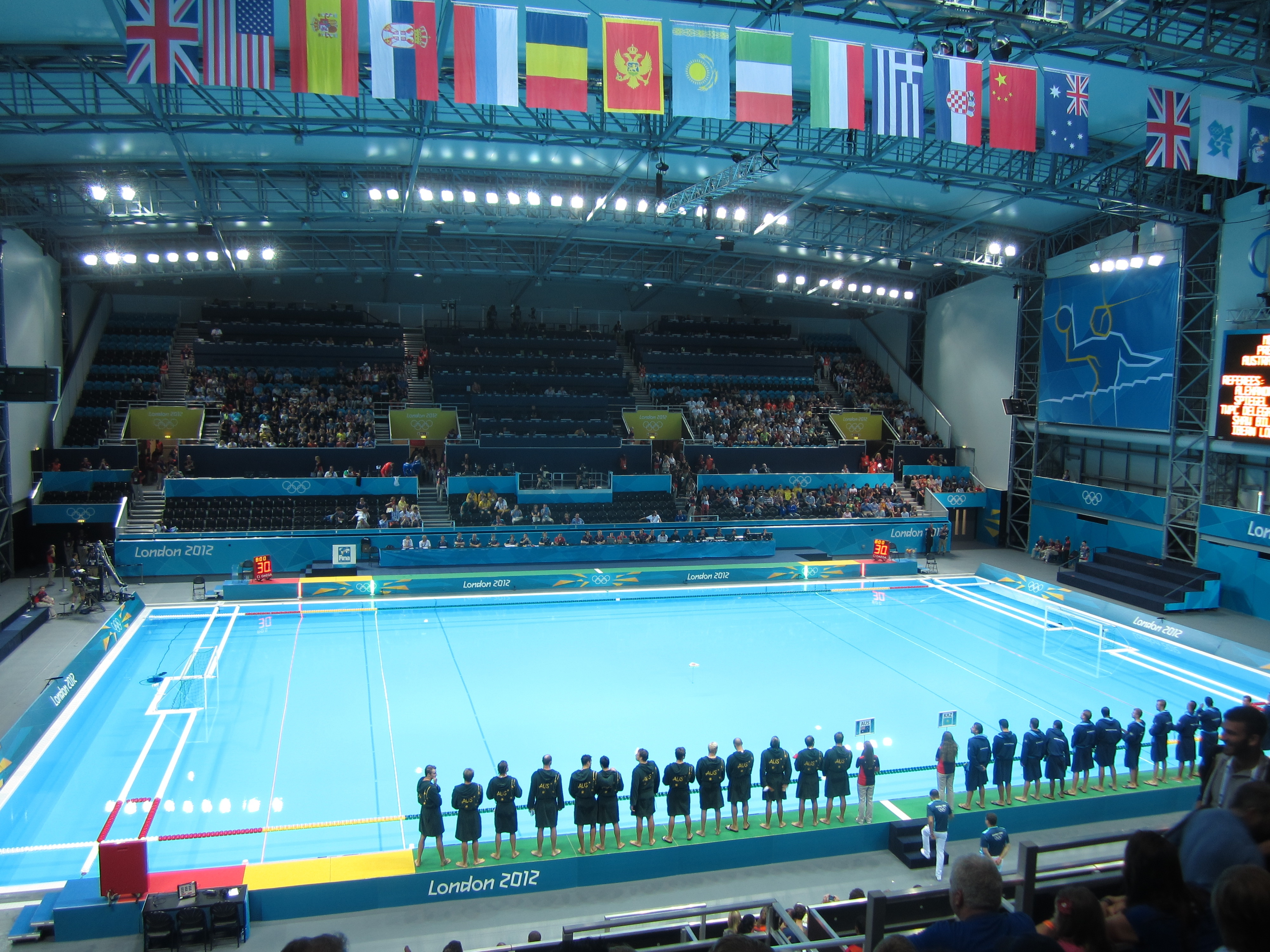
Inside the arena

=== Men's competition ===
Group A	Group B
Greece; Italy; Kazakhstan; Spain; Australia; Croatia	Hungary; Montenegro; Romania; Great Britain; United States; Serbia

=== Women's competition ===
Group A	Group B
Hungary; Spain; China; United States	Italy; Great Britain; Russia; Australia

== Medal summary ==
=== Medal table ===
Rank	Nation	Gold	Silver	Bronze	Total
1	Croatia	1	0	0	1
1	United States	1	0	0	1
3	Italy	0	1	0	1
3	Spain	0	1	0	1
5	Australia	0	0	1	1
5	Serbia	0	0	1	1
Totals (6 entries)		2	2	2	6

=== Events ===
Event	Gold	Silver	Bronze
Men	Croatia; Josip Pavić; Damir Burić; Miho Bošković; Nikša Dobud; Maro Joković; Petar Muslim; Ivan Buljubašić; Andro Bušlje; Sandro Sukno; Samir Barać; Igor Hinić; Paulo Obradović; Frano Vićan	Italy; Stefano Tempesti; Amaurys Pérez; Niccolò Gitto; Pietro Figlioli; Alex Giorgetti; Maurizio Felugo; Massimo Giacoppo; Valentino Gallo; Christian Presciutti; Deni Fiorentini; Matteo Aicardi; Danijel Premuš; Giacomo Pastorino	Serbia; Slobodan Soro; Aleksa Šaponjić; Živko Gocić; Vanja Udovičić; Dušan Mandić; Duško Pijetlović; Slobodan Nikić; Milan Aleksić; Nikola Rađen; Filip Filipović; Andrija Prlainović; Stefan Mitrović; Gojko Pijetlović
Women	United States; Elizabeth Armstrong; Heather Petri; Melissa Seidemann; Brenda Villa; Lauren Wenger; Maggie Steffens; Courtney Mathewson; Jessica Steffens; Elsie Windes; Kelly Rulon; Annika Dries; Kami Craig; Tumua Anae	Spain; Laura Ester; Marta Bach; Anni Espar; Roser Tarragó; Matilde Ortiz; Jennifer Pareja; Lorena Miranda; María del Pilar Peña; Andrea Blas; Ona Meseguer; María García Godoy; Laura López; Ana Copado	Australia; Victoria Brown; Gemma Beadsworth; Sophie Smith; Holly Lincoln-Smith; Jane Moran; Bronwen Knox; Rowena Webster; Kate Gynther; Glencora Ralph; Ashleigh Southern; Melissa Rippon; Nicola Zagame; Alicia McCormack

== Sources ==
- PDF documents on the FINA website:
  - Official Results Book – 2012 Olympic Games – Diving, Swimming, Synchronised Swimming, Water Polo (archive) (pp. 284–507)
- Water polo on the Olympedia website
  - Water polo at the 2012 Summer Olympics (men's tournament, women's tournament)
- Water polo on the Sports Reference website
  - Water polo at the 2012 Summer Games (men's tournament, women's tournament) (archived)
