= Tobias Kreuzmann =

German water polo player

Personal information
- Born: 15 June 1981 (age 43); Duisburg, West Germany

Sport
- Sport: Water polo

Tobias Kreuzmann (born 15 June 1981) is a German water polo player who competed in the 2004 Summer Olympics and in the 2008 Summer Olympics.

== See also ==
- Germany men's Olympic water polo team records and statistics
