= Marc Minguell =

Spanish water polo player (born 1985)

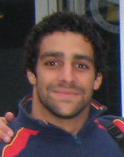

Personal information
- Full name: Marc Minguell Alférez
- Nationality: Spain
- Born: 14 January 1985 (age 41) Barcelona, Spain
- Height: 186 cm (6 ft 1 in)
- Weight: 95 kg (209 lb)

Sport
- Sport: Water polo
- Handedness: Right
National team
- Years: Team
- 2006–2018: Spain
Medal record
Men's water polo
Representing Spain
World Championship
Silver medal – second place	2009 Rome	Team
Bronze medal – third place	2007 Melbourne	Team
FINA World Cup
Bronze medal – third place	2010 Oradea	Team
European Championship
Silver medal – second place	2018 Barcelona	Team
Bronze medal – third place	2006 Belgrade	Team
- Updated on 12 March 2020

Marc Minguell Alférez (born 14 January 1985 in Barcelona) is a Spanish water polo player who competed for the Spain men's national water polo team in three consecutive Summer Olympics (2008 Beijing, 2012 London and 2016 Rio. He helped Spanish water polo club CN Atlètic-Barceloneta win the LEN Champions League in 2013–14 season.

== See also ==
- List of World Aquatics Championships medalists in water polo
