= Julian Real =

German water polo player

Personal information
- Born: 22 December 1989 (age 35); Oberhausen, West Germany

Sport
- Sport: Water polo

Julian Real (born 22 December 1989) is a German water polo player who competed in the 2008 Summer Olympics.
