= Xavier Vallès =

Spanish water polo player (born 1979)

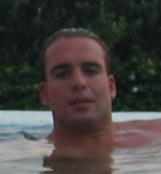
- 2008

Personal information
- Born: 4 September 1979 (age 46) Sabadell, Spain

Sport
- Sport: Water polo
Medal record
Representing Spain
World Championships
Silver medal – second place	2009 Rome	Team competition
Bronze medal – third place	2007 Melbourne	Team competition
European Championship
Bronze medal – third place	2006 Belgrade	Team competition
Summer Universiade
Gold medal – first place	1999 Palma de Mallorca	Team competition
Mediterranean Games
Gold medal – first place	2001 Tunis	Team competition
Gold medal – first place	2005 Almeria	Team competition
Silver medal – second place	2009 Pescara	Team competition

Xavier "Xavi" Vallès Trias (born 4 September 1979) is a Spanish water polo player who competed in the 2008 Summer Olympics. and 2012 Summer Olympics

== See also ==
- List of World Aquatics Championships medalists in water polo
