= Water polo at the 2007 World Aquatics Championships – Men's team rosters =

These are the rosters of all participating teams at the Men's water polo tournament at the 2007 World Aquatics Championships held between 18 March to 1 April in Melbourne, Australia.

== Romania ==
No.	Name	Date of birth	L/R	Position	Height	Weight	Caps
1	Berttini Nenciu	21 November 1977	R	goalkeeper	1.92 m (6 ft 4 in)	100 kg (220 lb)	63
2	Cosmin Radu	9 November 1981	L	centre forward	1.95 m (6 ft 5 in)	100 kg (220 lb)	168
3	Tiberiu Negrean						
4	Florin Bonca	2 May 1971	R		1.82 m (6 ft 0 in)	87 kg (192 lb)	275
5	Andrei Iosep	20 September 1977	L		1.95 m (6 ft 5 in)	96 kg (212 lb)	231
6	Andrei Busila	10 November 1980	R	centre back	2.02 m (6 ft 8 in)	100 kg (220 lb)	108
7	Gheorghe Dunca	30 March 1979	R	centre forward	1.91 m (6 ft 3 in)	115 kg (254 lb)	61
8	Ramiro Georgescu	27 November 1982	R		1.95 m (6 ft 5 in)	95 kg (209 lb)	69
9	Edward Dina Andrei	19 January 1975	R	driver	1.80 m (5 ft 11 in)	80 kg (180 lb)	306
10	George Georgescu	13 September 1978	R		1.81 m (5 ft 11 in)	85 kg (187 lb)	95
11	Alexandru Matei	31 December 1980	R		1.95 m (6 ft 5 in)	97 kg (214 lb)	106
12	Kalman Kadar	11 June 1979	R	centre back	1.89 m (6 ft 2 in)	85 kg (187 lb)	172
13	Dragos Stoenescu	30 May 1979	R	goalkeeper	1.96 m (6 ft 5 in)	93 kg (205 lb)	110

== Japan ==
No.	Name	Date of birth	L/R	Position	Height	Weight	Caps
1	Tomonaga Eguchi	21 June 1981	R	goalkeeper	1.78 m (5 ft 10 in)	75 kg (165 lb)	40
2	Kan Aoyagi	19 August 1980	R	driver	1.84 m (6 ft 0 in)	86 kg (190 lb)	70
3	Yasuhiro Haraguchi	2 March 1986	R	driver	1.74 m (5 ft 9 in)	78 kg (172 lb)	10
4	Naofumi Nishikakoi	20 June 1985	R	centre forward	1.84 m (6 ft 0 in)	78 kg (172 lb)	10
5	Koji Tanaka	10 July 1977	R	driver	1.83 m (6 ft 0 in)	83 kg (183 lb)	100
6	Shoichi Sakamoto	17 July 1982	R	centre forward	1.82 m (6 ft 0 in)	96 kg (212 lb)	30
7	Koji Kobayashi	8 May 1982	R	centre back	1.84 m (6 ft 0 in)	89 kg (196 lb)	30
8	Atsushi Naganuma	22 September 1982	R	driver	1.80 m (5 ft 11 in)	81 kg (179 lb)	60
9	Taichi Sato	14 April 1980	R	driver	1.68 m (5 ft 6 in)	68 kg (150 lb)	70
10	Yoshinori Shiota	12 August 1982	R	driver	1.78 m (5 ft 10 in)	90 kg (200 lb)	60
11	Hiroshi Hoshiai	5 June 1982	L	centre forward	1.81 m (5 ft 11 in)	80 kg (180 lb)	60
12	Satoshi Nagata	19 February 1981	R	centre back	1.86 m (6 ft 1 in)	87 kg (192 lb)	70
13	Hitoshi Oshima	22 December 1983	R	goalkeeper	1.93 m (6 ft 4 in)	85 kg (187 lb)	10

== Italy ==
No.	Name	Date of birth	L/R	Position	Height	Weight	Caps
1	Stefano Tempesti	9 June 1979	R	goalkeeper	2.05 m (6 ft 9 in)	97 kg (214 lb)	
2	Francesco Postiglione	29 April 1972	R	centre back			
3	Alex Gioretti	24 December 1987	R	driver	1.87 m (6 ft 2 in)	78 kg (172 lb)	
4	Fabrizio Buonocore	28 April 1977	R	centre back			
5	Andrea Scotti Galletta	9 August 1982	R	centre back	1.84 m (6 ft 0 in)	88 kg (194 lb)	
6	Murizio Felugo	4 March 1981	R	driver	1.89 m (6 ft 2 in)	86 kg (190 lb)	
7	Federico Mistrangelo	11 May 1981	R	driver	1.81 m (5 ft 11 in)	80 kg (180 lb)	
8	Valerio Rizzo	21 September 1984	R	driver	1.74 m (5 ft 9 in)	82 kg (181 lb)	
9	Fabio Bencivenga	20 January 1976	R	centre forward	2.00 m (6 ft 7 in)	100 kg (220 lb)	
10	Alessandro Calcaterra	26 May 1975	R	centre forward	1.87 m (6 ft 2 in)	110 kg (240 lb)	
11	Luigi Di Costanzo	5 February 1982	L	driver	1.86 m (6 ft 1 in)	86 kg (190 lb)	
12	Goran Fiorentini	21 November 1981	R	driver	1.90 m (6 ft 3 in)	90 kg (200 lb)	
13	Fabio Violetti	1 February 1974	R	goalkeeper	1.91 m (6 ft 3 in)	82 kg (181 lb)	

== Hungary ==
No.	Name	Date of birth	L/R	Position	Height	Weight	Caps
1	Zoltán Szécsi	22 December 1977	R	goalkeeper			
2	Dániel Varga	25 September 1983	R				
3	Norbert Madaras	1 December 1979	R				
4	Dénes Varga	29 March 1987	R				
5	Tamás Kásás	20 July 1976	R				
6	Márton Szivós	19 August 1981	R				
7	Gergely Kiss	21 September 1977	R				
8	Tibor Benedek	12 July 1972	R				
9	Rajmund Fodor	21 February 1976	R				
10	Péter Biros	5 April 1976	R				
11	Gábor Kis	27 September 1982	R				
12	Tamás Molnár	2 August 1975	R				
13	Viktor Nagy	24 July 1984	R	goalkeeper			

== Greece ==
No.	Name	Date of birth	L/R	Position	Height	Weight	Caps
1	Nikolaos Deligiannis	3 September 1976	R	goalkeeper	1.90 m (6 ft 3 in)	96 kg (212 lb)	200
2	Anastasios Schizas	18 February 1977	R	driver	1.91 m (6 ft 3 in)	91 kg (201 lb)	150
3	Dimitrios Mazis	5 September 1976	R	centre back	1.84 m (6 ft 0 in)	85 kg (187 lb)	310
4	Stefanos Santa	21 May 1975	R				202
5	Theodoros Chatzitheodorou	1 October 1976	R	centre forward	1.92 m (6 ft 4 in)	98 kg (216 lb)	237
6	Konstantinos Kokkinakis	9 October 1975	R	centre back	1.93 m (6 ft 4 in)	105 kg (231 lb)	80
7	Christos Afroudakis	23 May 1984	R		1.88 m (6 ft 2 in)	88 kg (194 lb)	130
8	Georgios Ntoskas	11 November 1984	R		1.86 m (6 ft 1 in)	99 kg (218 lb)	100
9	Georgios Afroudakis	17 October 1976	R	centre forward	1.94 m (6 ft 4 in)	105 kg (231 lb)	350
10	Dimitrios Miteloudis	11 February 1982	R	centre back	1.86 m (6 ft 1 in)	87 kg (192 lb)	75
11	Antonios Vlontakis	10 October 1975	R	centre forward	1.88 m (6 ft 2 in)	96 kg (212 lb)	130
12	Emmanouil Mylonakis	9 April 1985	R		1.85 m (6 ft 1 in)	74 kg (163 lb)	100
13	Georgios Reppas	11 December 1974	R	goalkeeper	1.89 m (6 ft 2 in)	88 kg (194 lb)	260

== Germany ==
No.	Name	Date of birth	L/R	Position	Height	Weight	Caps
1	Alexander Tchigir	6 November 1968		goalkeeper	1.91 m (6 ft 3 in)	82 kg (181 lb)	
2	Florian Naroska	16 April 1982					
3	Andreas Schlotterbeck	2 March 1982			1.90 m (6 ft 3 in)	106 kg (234 lb)	
4	Marko Savic	11 January 1981			1.75 m (5 ft 9 in)	84 kg (185 lb)	
5	Steffen Dierolf	5 May 1976	R				
6	Marc Politze	20 October 1977					
7	Heiko Nossek	14 March 1982					
8	Thomas Schertwitis	2 September 1972					
9	Tobias Kreuzmann	15 June 1981			1.95 m (6 ft 5 in)	92 kg (203 lb)	
10	Lukasz Kieloch	15 March 1976					
11	Moritz Oeler	21 October 1985			1.88 m (6 ft 2 in)	80 kg (180 lb)	
12	Sören Mackeben	29 January 1979			1.83 m (6 ft 0 in)	85 kg (187 lb)	
13	Michael Zellmer	14 August 1977		goalkeeper	1.90 m (6 ft 3 in)	97 kg (214 lb)	

== Croatia ==
No.	Name	Date of birth	L/R	Position	Height	Weight	Caps
1	Frano Vican	24 January 1976	R	goalkeeper	1.93 m (6 ft 4 in)	90 kg (200 lb)	123
2	Damir Buric	2 December 1980	R	centre back	2.05 m (6 ft 9 in)	113 kg (249 lb)	95
3	Andro Buslje	4 January 1986	R	centre back	1.99 m (6 ft 6 in)	107 kg (236 lb)	49
4	Zdeslav Vrdoljak	15 March 1971	R				
5	Aljosa Kunac	18 August 1980	R	centre back			
6	Maro Jokovic	1 October 1987	L		2.03 m (6 ft 8 in)	96 kg (212 lb)	19
7	Mile Smodlaka	1 January 1976	R	centre forward	1.98 m (6 ft 6 in)	113 kg (249 lb)	156
8	Teo Dogas	19 February 1977	R		1.87 m (6 ft 2 in)	87 kg (192 lb)	142
9	Pavo Markovic	20 April 1985	R	driver	1.90 m (6 ft 3 in)	92 kg (203 lb)	27
10	Samir Barac	2 November 1973	R				170
11	Igor Hinic	4 December 1975	R	centre forward	2.03 m (6 ft 8 in)	110 kg (240 lb)	252
12	Miho Boskovic	11 January 1983	R	driver	1.97 m (6 ft 6 in)	98 kg (216 lb)	55
13	Josip Pavic	15 January 1982	R	goalkeeper	1.96 m (6 ft 5 in)	90 kg (200 lb)	70

== China ==
No.	Name	Date of birth	L/R	Position	Height	Weight	Caps
1	Ge Weiqing	25 April 1977	R	goalkeeper	1.84 m (6 ft 0 in)	89 kg (196 lb)	67
2	Liang Zhongxing	23 December 1986	R	driver	1.98 m (6 ft 6 in)	97 kg (214 lb)	24
3	Tan Feihu	1 January 1987	R	centre forward	1.90 m (6 ft 3 in)	103 kg (227 lb)	26
4	Yu Lijun	28 November 1973	R	centre forward	1.96 m (6 ft 5 in)	108 kg (238 lb)	67
5	Li Jun	18 October 1980	R	centre forward	1.90 m (6 ft 3 in)	87 kg (192 lb)	67
6	Li Bin	24 October 1983	R	driver	1.84 m (6 ft 0 in)	96 kg (212 lb)	25
7	Xie Junmin	17 May 1983	R	driver	1.86 m (6 ft 1 in)	86 kg (190 lb)	26
8	Wang Yong	29 January 1979	R		1.83 m (6 ft 0 in)	88 kg (194 lb)	67
9	Wang Yang	17 January 1983	L	driver	1.85 m (6 ft 1 in)	77 kg (170 lb)	15
10	Han Zhidong	29 July 1977	R	driver	1.80 m (5 ft 11 in)	84 kg (185 lb)	67
11	Wu Zhiyu	9 September 1983	R	centre back	1.90 m (6 ft 3 in)	104 kg (229 lb)	26
12	Qiu Yuanzhong	10 April 1984	R		1.94 m (6 ft 4 in)	96 kg (212 lb)	26
13	Ma Jianjun	8 October 1984	R	goalkeeper	1.92 m (6 ft 4 in)	82 kg (181 lb)	20

== Canada ==
No.	Name	Date of birth	L/R	Position	Height	Weight	Caps
1	Robin Randall	1 May 1980	R	goalkeeper	1.88 m (6 ft 2 in)	82 kg (181 lb)	
2	Constantine Kudaba	17 May 1987	R	driver	1.80 m (5 ft 11 in)	79 kg (174 lb)	
3	Jonathan Ruse	12 January 1987	R	driver	1.80 m (5 ft 11 in)	83 kg (183 lb)	
4	Kevin Mitchell	21 June 1981	R		1.74 m (5 ft 9 in)	75 kg (165 lb)	
5	Kevin Graham	21 April 1986	L		1.94 m (6 ft 4 in)	90 kg (200 lb)	
6	Thomas Marks	2 July 1980	R		1.90 m (6 ft 3 in)	86 kg (190 lb)	
7	Brandon Jung	28 April 1986	R	driver	1.88 m (6 ft 2 in)	89 kg (196 lb)	
8	Daniel Stein	21 December 1983	R	centre forward	1.96 m (6 ft 5 in)	98 kg (216 lb)	
9	Aaron Feltham	16 April 1982	R	driver	1.91 m (6 ft 3 in)	86 kg (190 lb)	
10	Noah Miller	5 May 1980	R	driver	1.88 m (6 ft 2 in)	80 kg (180 lb)	
11	Jean Sayegh	28 June 1981	L	driver	1.96 m (6 ft 5 in)	90 kg (200 lb)	
12	Nathaniel Miller	21 September 1979	R	driver	1.88 m (6 ft 2 in)	93 kg (205 lb)	
13	Nicolas Youngblud	16 January 1981	R	goalkeeper	1.78 m (5 ft 10 in)	77 kg (170 lb)	

== Australia ==
No.	Name	Date of birth	L/R	Position	Height	Weight	Caps
1	James Stanton	21 July 1983	R	goalkeeper	2.00 m (6 ft 7 in)	93 kg (205 lb)	
2	Daniel Marsden	16 November 1970	R	driver	1.90 m (6 ft 3 in)	95 kg (209 lb)	
3	Trent Franklin	12 February 1979	L	driver	1.84 m (6 ft 0 in)	82 kg (181 lb)	
4	Pietro Figlioli	29 May 1984	R	driver	1.90 m (6 ft 3 in)	90 kg (200 lb)	
5	Robert Maitland	4 September 1983	R	centre back	1.90 m (6 ft 3 in)	99 kg (218 lb)	
6	Anthony Martin	22 March 1985	R		1.90 m (6 ft 3 in)	95 kg (209 lb)	
7	Timothy Neesham	20 October 1979	L	driver	1.84 m (6 ft 0 in)	86 kg (190 lb)	
8	Samuel Mcgregor	12 August 1984	R	centre back	1.92 m (6 ft 4 in)	95 kg (209 lb)	
9	Thomas Whalan	13 October 1980	R		1.94 m (6 ft 4 in)	90 kg (200 lb)	
10	Gavin Woods	1 March 1978	R	centre forward	2.00 m (6 ft 7 in)	95 kg (209 lb)	
11	John Cotterill	27 October 1987	R	driver	1.94 m (6 ft 4 in)	85 kg (187 lb)	
12	Jamie Beadsworth	11 June 1985	R	centre forward	1.92 m (6 ft 4 in)	102 kg (225 lb)	
13	Laurie Trettel	3 October 1979	R	goalkeeper	1.92 m (6 ft 4 in)	93 kg (205 lb)	

== United States ==
No.	Name	Date of birth	L/R	Position	Height	Weight	Caps
1	Merrill Moses	13 August 1977	R	goalkeeper	1.91 m (6 ft 3 in)	96 kg (212 lb)	
2	Peter Varellas	2 October 1984	L	driver	1.91 m (6 ft 3 in)	86 kg (190 lb)	
3	Dreason Barry	25 January 1983	R	centre back	2.08 m (6 ft 10 in)	100 kg (220 lb)	
4	Jeff Powers	21 January 1980	R	centre forward	2.01 m (6 ft 7 in)	103 kg (227 lb)	
5	Adam Wright	4 May 1977	R	driver	1.91 m (6 ft 3 in)	86 kg (190 lb)	
6	Kevin Witt	19 August 1981	L	driver	1.85 m (6 ft 1 in)	86 kg (190 lb)	
7	Ryan Bailey	28 August 1975	R	centre forward	1.98 m (6 ft 6 in)	100 kg (220 lb)	
8	Tony Azevedo	21 November 1981	R	driver	1.85 m (6 ft 1 in)	89 kg (196 lb)	
9	Rick Merlo	5 August 1982	R	centre back	1.91 m (6 ft 3 in)	96 kg (212 lb)	
10	Layne Beaubien	4 July 1976	R	centre back	1.98 m (6 ft 6 in)	96 kg (212 lb)	
11	Jesse Smith	27 April 1983	R	centre back	1.96 m (6 ft 5 in)	105 kg (231 lb)	
12	Brian Alexander	3 May 1983	R	centre back	1.91 m (6 ft 3 in)	94 kg (207 lb)	
13	Genai Kerr	25 December 1976	R	goalkeeper	2.03 m (6 ft 8 in)	100 kg (220 lb)	

== Spain ==
No.	Name	Date of birth	L/R	Position	Height	Weight	Caps
1	Inaki Aguilar	9 September 1983	L	goalkeeper			
2	Mario Garcia	15 July 1983	L				
3	David Martin	2 January 1977	L				
4	Ricardo Perrone	21 December 1976	L				
5	Guillermo Molina	16 March 1984	L	driver			
6	Marc Minguell	14 January 1985	L	centre back			
7	Ivan Gallego	13 February 1984	L				
8	Svilen Piralkov	8 April 1975	L				
9	Xavier Valles	4 September 1979	L	centre forward			
10	Felipe Perrone	27 February 1986	L	driver			
11	Ivan Perez	29 June 1971	L	centre forward			
12	Xavier Garcia	5 January 1984	R				
13	Angel Andreo	3 December 1972	L	goalkeeper			

== South Africa ==
No.	Name	Date of birth	L/R	Position	Height	Weight	Caps
1	Dwayne Flatscher	9 July 1984	R	goalkeeper	1.87 m (6 ft 2 in)	85 kg (187 lb)	8
2	Etienne Le Roux	18 December 1987	R	driver	1.86 m (6 ft 1 in)	85 kg (187 lb)	15
3	Joao Marco De Carvalho	14 November 1983	R	centre back	1.84 m (6 ft 0 in)	100 kg (220 lb)	
4	Kevin O'Brien	23 November 1982	L		1.89 m (6 ft 2 in)	95 kg (209 lb)	5
5	Wayne Cowden	26 March 1982	R	centre back	1.92 m (6 ft 4 in)	106 kg (234 lb)	8
6	Alastair Stewart	24 November 1976	L	driver	1.91 m (6 ft 3 in)	90 kg (200 lb)	30
7	Marvyn Kilian	5 August 1976	R		1.95 m (6 ft 5 in)	85 kg (187 lb)	30
8	Ryan Bell	30 January 1982	R	centre back	1.86 m (6 ft 1 in)	105 kg (231 lb)	30
9	Rick Diesel	17 December 1982	R	centre back	1.98 m (6 ft 6 in)	95 kg (209 lb)	6
10	Karl Niehaus	16 April 1978	R	centre forward	1.98 m (6 ft 6 in)	98 kg (216 lb)	10
11	Adam Kajee	28 February 1987	R		1.76 m (5 ft 9 in)	71 kg (157 lb)	
12	Duncan Woods	4 March 1978	R	centre forward	1.83 m (6 ft 0 in)	90 kg (200 lb)	35
13	Donn Stewart	22 August 1980					

== Serbia ==
No.	Name	Date of birth	L/R	Position	Height	Weight	Caps
1	Denis Sefik	20 August 1976	R	goalkeeper	1.97 m (6 ft 6 in)	108 kg (238 lb)	
2	Andrija Prlainovic	28 April 1987	R		1.84 m (6 ft 0 in)	87 kg (192 lb)	
3	Zivko Gocic	22 August 1982	R		1.88 m (6 ft 2 in)	86 kg (190 lb)	
4	Vanda Udovicic	12 September 1982	R	centre back	1.88 m (6 ft 2 in)	84 kg (185 lb)	
5	Dejan Savic	24 February 1975	R	centre back	1.87 m (6 ft 2 in)	94 kg (207 lb)	
6	Danilo Ikodinovic	4 October 1976	R	centre back	1.87 m (6 ft 2 in)	86 kg (190 lb)	
7	Slobodan Nikic	25 January 1983	R	centre forward	1.87 m (6 ft 2 in)	84 kg (185 lb)	
8	Filip Filipovic	2 March 1987	L	centre forward	1.90 m (6 ft 3 in)	87 kg (192 lb)	
9	Aleksandar Ciric	30 December 1977	R		1.85 m (6 ft 1 in)	86 kg (190 lb)	
10	Aleksandar Sapic	1 May 1978	R		1.89 m (6 ft 2 in)	88 kg (194 lb)	
11	Vladimir Vujasinovic	14 August 1973	R	centre back	1.91 m (6 ft 3 in)	93 kg (205 lb)	
12	Miloš Korolija	21 November 1981			1.97 m (6 ft 6 in)		
13	Slobodan Soro	23 November 1978	R	goalkeeper	1.96 m (6 ft 5 in)	91 kg (201 lb)	

== Russia ==
No.	Name	Date of birth	L/R	Position	Height	Weight	Caps
1	Egor Rastorguev						
2	Yury Yatsev	2 March 1979	R				
3	Vitaly Yurchik	17 May 1983	R				
4	Alexey Agarkov (C)	6 April 1983	R				
5	Roman Balashov	9 February 1977	R				
6	Alexander Eryshov	17 January 1973	R				
7	Vladimir Ushakov						
8	Dimitry Stratan	24 January 1975	R				
9	Alexander Aksenov	22 February 1979	R				
10	Marat Zakirov	8 October 1973	R				
11	Sergey Garbuzov	13 January 1974	R				
12	Sergey Evstigneev	17 January 1974	R				
13	Sergey Lisunov	12 October 1986	R				

== See also ==
- Water polo at the 2007 World Aquatics Championships – Women's team rosters
