= 2007 FINA Men's Water Polo World League =

- League: FINA Water Polo World League
- Sport: Water Polo
- Duration: 3 July – 12 August 2007
- League champions: Serbia

FINA Men's Water Polo World League seasons
- ← 2006 2008 →

The 2007 FINA Men's Water Polo World League was the sixth edition of the annual event, organised by the world's governing body in aquatics, the FINA. After six preliminary rounds, the Super Final was held in Berlin, Germany from 7 to 12 August 2007.

== Preliminary round ==
=== Asia/Oceania ===
- Held in Shanghai, PR China

	Team	Points	G	W	D	L	GF	GA	Diff
1.	Australia	12	4	4	0	0	55	24	+31
2.	China	6	4	2	0	2	34	43	–9
3.	Japan	0	4	0	0	4	26	48	–22

- July 3, 2007

China	10 – 8	Japan

- July 4, 2007

China	5 – 17	Australia

- July 5, 2007

Japan	8 – 12	Australia

- July 6, 2007

China	11 – 7	Japan

- July 7, 2007

China	8 – 11	Australia

- July 8, 2007

Japan	3 – 15	Australia

=== Europe I ===
- Held in Novi Sad, Serbia and Pescara, Italy

	Team	Points	G	W	D	L	GF	GA	Diff
1.	Serbia	21	8	7	0	1	102	64	+38
2.	Montenegro	18	8	6	0	2	93	67	+26
3.	Italy	12	8	4	0	4	89	90	–1
4.	Germany	6	8	2	0	6	60	89	–29
5.	Greece	3	8	1	0	7	52	86	–34

- Germany qualified as the hosting nation of the Super Final
- July 4, 2007

Italy	13 – 11	Montenegro
Serbia	13 – 5	Greece

- July 5, 2007

Montenegro	14 – 6	Greece
Serbia	12 – 6	Germany

- July 6, 2007

Italy	9 – 7	Germany
Serbia	12 – 11	Montenegro

- July 7, 2007

Montenegro	11 – 5	Germany
Italy	10 – 9	Greece

- July 8, 2007

Greece	4 – 5	Germany
Serbia	15 – 11	Italy

- July 18, 2007

Germany	7 – 12	Greece
Italy	9 – 10	Serbia

- July 19, 2007

Greece	5 – 17	Serbia
Montenegro	12 – 11	Italy

- July 20, 2007

Greece	3 – 11	Montenegro
Serbia	13 – 5	Germany

- July 21, 2007

Serbia	10 – 12	Montenegro
Italy	17 – 18	Germany

- July 22, 2007

Montenegro	11 – 7	Germany
Italy	9 – 8	Greece

=== Europe II ===
- Held in Budapest, Hungary and Portugalete, Spain

	Team	Points	G	W	D	L	GF	GA	Diff
1.	Hungary	24	8	8	0	0	110	56	+54
2.	Romania	12	8	4	0	4	67	78	–11
3.	Spain	9	8	3	0	5	58	67	–9
4.	Croatia	9	8	3	0	5	71	87	–16
5.	Russia	6	8	2	0	6	61	79	–18

- July 4, 2007

Russia	3 – 6	Spain
Hungary	16 – 10	Romania

- July 5, 2007

Russia	7 – 11	Croatia
Hungary	12 – 9	Spain

- July 6, 2007

Romania	9 – 8	Russia
Spain	6 – 8	Croatia

- July 7, 2007

Hungary	15 – 6	Croatia
Spain	8 – 7	Romania

- July 8, 2007

Croatia	14 – 11	Romania
Hungary	15 – 7	Russia

- July 18, 2007

Russia	6 – 7	Romania
Spain	4 – 8	Hungary

- July 19, 2007

Spain	10 – 11	Russia
Romania	8 – 6	Croatia

- July 20, 2007

Romania	6 – 17	Hungary
Russia	14 – 8	Croatia

- July 21, 2007

Croatia	9 – 14	Hungary
Spain	3 – 9	Romania

- July 22, 2007

Russia	5 – 13	Hungary
Spain	12 – 9	Croatia

== Super Final ==
=== Teams ===
GROUP A

- China
- Romania
- Serbia
- United States

GROUP B

- Australia
- Canada
- Germany
- Hungary

=== Squads ===
==== Australia ====
- Mitchal Ainsworth
- Jamie Beadsworth
- Richie Campbell
- John Cotterill
- Pietro Figlioli
- Trent Franklin
- Robert Maitland
- Anthony Martin
- Ryan Moody
- Nick O'Halloran
- Grant Richardson
- James Stanton
- Thomas Whalan

Head coach:

- John Fox

==== Canada ====
- Brandon Jung
- Aaron Feltham
- Kevin Graham
- Con Kudaba
- Thomas Marks
- Nathaniel Miller
- Noah Miller
- Kevin Mitchell
- Jean Sayegh
- Robin Randall
- Andrew Robinson
- Daniel Stein
- Nic Youngblud

Head coach:

- Dragan Jovanović

==== China ====
- Ge Weiqing
- Guo Junliang
- Huang Quanhua
- Bin Li
- Li Jun
- Liang Zhongxing
- Qiu Yuanzhong
- Tan Feihu
- Han Zhidong
- Yu Lijun
- Yang Wang
- Wang Yong
- Wu Zhiyu

Head coach:

- Miroslav Trumbic

==== Germany ====
- Steffen Dierolf
- Roger Kong
- Tobias Kreuzmann
- Sören Mackeben
- Florian Naroska
- Heiko Nossek
- Moritz Oeler
- Marc Politze
- Marko Savić
- Thomas Scherwitis
- Andreas Schlotterbeck
- Fabian Schrödter
- Alexander Tchigir

Head coach:

- Hagen Stamm

==== Hungary ====
- László Baksa
- Péter Biros
- Rajmund Fodor
- Miklós Gór-Nagy
- Norbert Hosnyánszky
- Gergely Kiss
- Csaba Kiss
- Gabor Kiss
- Norbert Madaras
- Tamás Molnár
- Zoltán Szécsi
- Márton Szivós
- Dániel Varga

Head coach:

- Dénes Kemény

==== Romania ====
- Edward Andrei
- Cosmin Baldoc
- Andrei Busila
- Robert Dinu
- Gheorghe Dunca
- Andrei Iosep
- Ramiro Georgescu
- George Georgescu
- Alexandru Ghiban
- Kalman Kadar
- Tiberiu Negrean
- Bertini Nenciu
- Cosmin Radu

Head coach:

- Vlad Hagiu

==== Serbia ====
- Milan Aleksić
- Aleksandar Ćirić
- Filip Filipović
- Živko Gocić
- Stefan Mitrović
- Slobodan Nikić
- Duško Pijetlović
- Gojko Pijetlović
- Andrija Prlainović
- Aleksandar Šapić
- Dejan Savić
- Slobodan Soro
- Vanja Udovičić

Head coach:

- Dejan Udovičić

==== United States ====
- Tony Azevedo
- Ryan Bailey
- Ronald Beaubien
- Adam Hewko
- Thomas Hopkins
- Peter Hudnut
- Genai Kerr
- John Mann
- Merrill Moses
- Jeffrey Powers
- Jesse Smith
- Peter Varellas
- Adam Wright

Head coach:

- Terry Schroeder

=== Group A ===
	Team	Points	G	W	D	L	GF	GA	Diff
1.	Serbia	9	3	3	0	0	50	17	+33
2.	Romania	6	3	2	0	1	28	34	–6
3.	United States	3	3	1	0	2	27	31	–4
4.	China	0	3	0	0	3	17	40	–23

- August 7, 2007

United States	3 – 13	Serbia
China	7 – 8	Romania

- August 8, 2007

Romania	9 – 17	Serbia
United States	12 – 7	China

- August 9, 2007

United States	10 – 11	Romania
China	3 – 20	Serbia

=== Group B ===
	Team	Points	G	W	D	L	GF	GA	Diff
1.	Hungary	9	3	3	0	0	42	22	+20
2.	Germany	6	3	2	0	1	35	30	+5
3.	Australia	3	3	1	0	2	32	40	–8
4.	Canada	0	3	0	0	3	25	42	–17

- August 7, 2007

Australia	8 – 15	Hungary
Canada	8 – 13	Germany

- August 8, 2007

Hungary	7 – 5	Germany
Canada	8 – 9	Australia

- August 9, 2007

Australia	15 – 17	Germany
Canada	9 – 20	Hungary

=== Quarterfinals ===
- August 10, 2007

Australia	9 – 6	Romania
China	6 – 13	Hungary
Germany	9 – 3	United States
Serbia	10 – 6	Canada

=== Semifinals ===
- August 11, 2007

Canada	5 – 11	United States
China	10 – 13	Romania

Serbia	8 – 7	Germany
Hungary	16 – 7	Australia

=== Finals ===
- August 12, 2007 — Seventh place

Canada	12 – 11	China

- August 12, 2007 — Fifth place

United States	9 – 6	Romania

- August 12, 2007 — Third place

Germany	6 – 7	Australia

- August 12, 2007 — First place

Serbia	9 – 6	Hungary

== Final ranking ==
RANK	TEAM
	Serbia
	Hungary
	Australia
4.	Germany
5.	United States
6.	Romania
7.	Canada
8.	China

2007 FINA Men's World League

Serbia
Third title

Serbia qualified for the 2008 Summer Olympics in Beijing, PR China

=== Awards ===
Top Scorer
(Serbia) Aleksandar Šapić
