= Water polo at the 2008 Summer Olympics – Men's tournament =

Men's water polo at the Games of the XXIX Olympiad
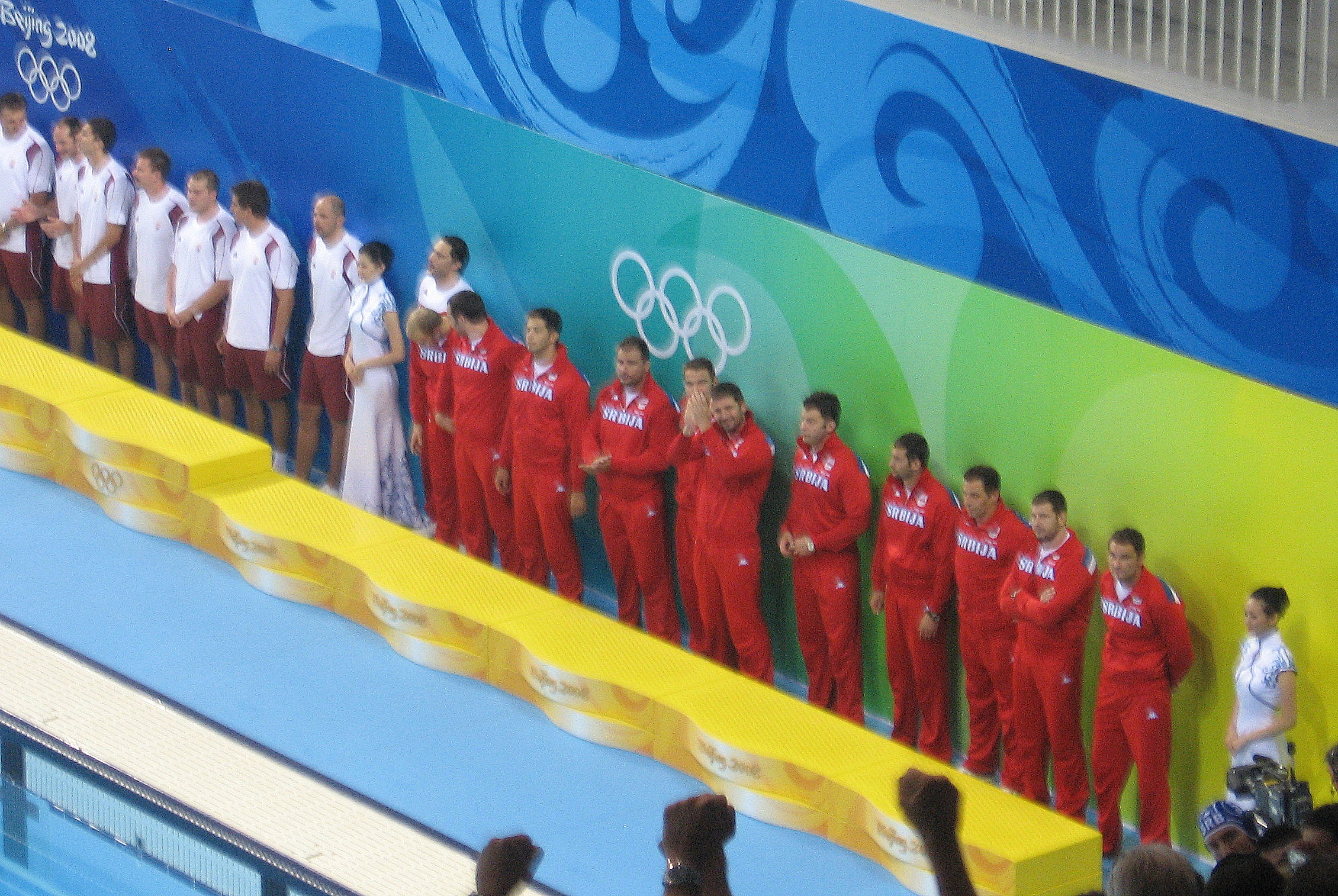
- Medal ceremony (left Hungary, right Serbia)

Tournament details
- Host country: China
- City: Beijing
- Venue(s): Ying Tung Natatorium
- Dates: 10–24 August 2008
- Teams: 12 (from 4 confederations)
- Competitors: 153

Final positions
- Champions: Hungary (9th title)
- Runners-up: United States
- Third place: Serbia
- Fourth place: Montenegro

Tournament statistics
- Matches: 44
- Goals scored: 784 (17.82 per match)
- Multiple appearances: 5-time Olympian(s): 1; 4-time Olympian(s): 10
- Multiple medalists: 3-time medalist(s): 10
- Top scorer(s): (Italy) Alessandro Calcaterra (27 goals in 8 matches)
- Most saves: (Italy) Stefano Tempesti (83 saves in 8 matches)
- Top sprinter(s): (Australia) Pietro Figlioli (21 sprints won in 7 matches)

The men's tournament of water polo at the 2008 Summer Olympics at Beijing, People's Republic of China, began on 10 August and lasted until 24 August 2008. All games were held at the Ying Tung Natatorium.

Teams from twelve nations competed, seeded into two groups for the preliminary round. 44 games were played, 30 of them in the preliminary round (each team played the other teams in the group). Seven classification games and seven games in the medal round were also played.

== Format ==
The format of water polo at the 2008 Summer Olympics:

- Twelve teams are divided into two preliminary groups, composed of six teams each, and play a single round robin in each group.
- The first placed team of each group will have a bye. The second and third placed teams will play against each other in a cross-group format. Losers go on to play a series of classification games.
- The fifth and sixth placed teams from each group in the preliminary round play against each other in a cross-group format to determine who will play for places 9–12. These games make up part of the quarterfinal round. The fourth placed teams from each group have a bye in this round. The losers of the classification games in the quarterfinal round will play for places 11–12. The winners of the classification games in the quarterfinal round will play the fourth placed teams from each group to determine who will play for places 7–10. These games are part of the semifinal round. The losers of the classification 7–10 games will play each other for places 9–10. The winners will play for places 7–8.
- Winners from the quarterfinal will progress to the semifinals and play against the first placed teams in each group of the preliminary round. Losers go on to play classification games.
- Winners of the semifinals will contest the gold medal game and the losers the bronze medal game.

== Preliminary round ==
=== Group A ===
Team	Pld	W	D	L	GF	GA	GD	Pts	Qualification
Hungary	5	4	1	0	60	36	+24	9	Qualified for the semifinals
Spain	5	4	0	1	52	34	+18	8	Qualified for the quarterfinals
Montenegro	5	2	2	1	43	33	+10	6	Qualified for the quarterfinals
Australia	5	2	1	2	45	40	+5	5	Will play for places 7–10
Greece	5	1	0	4	39	56	−17	2	Will play for places 7–12
Canada	5	0	0	5	21	61	−40	0	Will play for places 7–12

All times are China Standard Time (UTC+8).

10 August 2008; 9:30	Report	Spain	16–6	Canada	Ying Tung Natatorium, Beijing; Referees: Ciric (SRB), Ni (CHN)
10 August 2008; 9:30	Report	Score by quarters: 5–2, 4–2, 3–1, 4–1			Ying Tung Natatorium, Beijing; Referees: Ciric (SRB), Ni (CHN)
10 August 2008; 9:30	Report	Molina 3, X. García 3, Piralkov 2, Vallès 2, F. Perrone 2	Goals	Feltham 2	Ying Tung Natatorium, Beijing; Referees: Ciric (SRB), Ni (CHN)

10 August 2008; 10:50	Report	Hungary	10–10	Montenegro	Ying Tung Natatorium, Beijing; Referees: Margeta (SLO), Caputi (ITA)
10 August 2008; 10:50	Report	Score by quarters: 3–3, 3–1, 2–4, 2–2			Ying Tung Natatorium, Beijing; Referees: Margeta (SLO), Caputi (ITA)
10 August 2008; 10:50	Report	Dé. Varga 2, Kásás 2, Benedek 2	Goals	M. Janović 4, Ivović 2, Gojković 2	Ying Tung Natatorium, Beijing; Referees: Margeta (SLO), Caputi (ITA)

10 August 2008; 14:00	Report	Australia	12–8	Greece	Ying Tung Natatorium, Beijing; Referees: Bock (GER), Chaney (USA)
10 August 2008; 14:00	Report	Score by quarters: 5–5, 4–3, 2–0, 1–0			Ying Tung Natatorium, Beijing; Referees: Bock (GER), Chaney (USA)
10 August 2008; 14:00	Report	Figlioli 4, McGregor 3	Goals	Ntoskas 3	Ying Tung Natatorium, Beijing; Referees: Bock (GER), Chaney (USA)

12 August 2008; 9:30	Report	Canada	0–12	Montenegro	Ying Tung Natatorium, Beijing; Referees: Knights (NZL), Pinker (RSA)
12 August 2008; 9:30	Report	Score by quarters: 0–3, 0–4, 0–4, 0–1			Ying Tung Natatorium, Beijing; Referees: Knights (NZL), Pinker (RSA)
12 August 2008; 9:30	Report	-	Goals	Vukčević 2, M. Janović 2, Gojković 2	Ying Tung Natatorium, Beijing; Referees: Knights (NZL), Pinker (RSA)

12 August 2008; 10:50	Report	Spain	9–8	Australia	Ying Tung Natatorium, Beijing; Referees: Margeta (SLO), Caputi (ITA)
12 August 2008; 10:50	Report	Score by quarters: 4–0, 2–4, 2–2, 1–2			Ying Tung Natatorium, Beijing; Referees: Margeta (SLO), Caputi (ITA)
12 August 2008; 10:50	Report	X. García 3	Goals	Whalan 2, Woods 2	Ying Tung Natatorium, Beijing; Referees: Margeta (SLO), Caputi (ITA)

12 August 2008; 14:00	Report	Greece	6–17	Hungary	Ying Tung Natatorium, Beijing; Referees: Rak (CRO), Ciric (SRB)
12 August 2008; 14:00	Report	Score by quarters: 2–7, 2–2, 1–4, 1–4			Ying Tung Natatorium, Beijing; Referees: Rak (CRO), Ciric (SRB)
12 August 2008; 14:00	Report	Schizas 2	Goals	Biros 4, Benedek 3, Madaras 2, Dá. Varga 2, Molnár 2	Ying Tung Natatorium, Beijing; Referees: Rak (CRO), Ciric (SRB)

14 August 2008; 12:10	Report	Hungary	8–5	Spain	Ying Tung Natatorium, Beijing; Referees: Ciric (SRB), Chaney (USA)
14 August 2008; 12:10	Report	Score by quarters: 2–3, 4–2, 0–0, 2–0			Ying Tung Natatorium, Beijing; Referees: Ciric (SRB), Chaney (USA)
14 August 2008; 12:10	Report	Dé. Varga 2, Benedek 2, Kis 2	Goals	Molina 2	Ying Tung Natatorium, Beijing; Referees: Ciric (SRB), Chaney (USA)

14 August 2008; 14:00	Report	Montenegro	10–6	Greece	Ying Tung Natatorium, Beijing; Referees: Tulga (TUR), Margeta (SLO)
14 August 2008; 14:00	Report	Score by quarters: 3–1, 2–1, 5–2, 0–2			Ying Tung Natatorium, Beijing; Referees: Tulga (TUR), Margeta (SLO)
14 August 2008; 14:00	Report	M. Janović 2, Zloković 2, Gojković 2, Jokić 2	Goals	Ntoskas 2	Ying Tung Natatorium, Beijing; Referees: Tulga (TUR), Margeta (SLO)

14 August 2008; 15:20	Report	Australia	8–5	Canada	Ying Tung Natatorium, Beijing; Referees: Bock (GER), Klopper (NED)
14 August 2008; 15:20	Report	Score by quarters: 2–3, 2–1, 3–1, 1–0			Ying Tung Natatorium, Beijing; Referees: Bock (GER), Klopper (NED)
14 August 2008; 15:20	Report	Figlioli 3, Franklin 2	Goals	Feltham 2	Ying Tung Natatorium, Beijing; Referees: Bock (GER), Klopper (NED)

16 August 2008; 10:50	Report	Canada	7–13	Greece	Ying Tung Natatorium, Beijing; Referees: Hart (AUS), Ni (CHN)
16 August 2008; 10:50	Report	Score by quarters: 1–6, 4–5, 2–1, 0–1			Ying Tung Natatorium, Beijing; Referees: Hart (AUS), Ni (CHN)
16 August 2008; 10:50	Report	Graham 3, Feltham 3	Goals	Ntoskas 4, Theodoropoulos 3	Ying Tung Natatorium, Beijing; Referees: Hart (AUS), Ni (CHN)

16 August 2008; 14:00	Report	Spain	12–6	Montenegro	Ying Tung Natatorium, Beijing; Referees: Chaney (USA), Tulga (TUR)
16 August 2008; 14:00	Report	Score by quarters: 3–0, 4–1, 3–4, 2–1			Ying Tung Natatorium, Beijing; Referees: Chaney (USA), Tulga (TUR)
16 August 2008; 14:00	Report	Molina 3, F. Perrone 2, X. García 2	Goals	N. Janović 2, Ivović 2	Ying Tung Natatorium, Beijing; Referees: Chaney (USA), Tulga (TUR)

16 August 2008; 15:20	Report	Australia	12–13	Hungary	Ying Tung Natatorium, Beijing; Referees: Klopper (NED), Rak (CRO)
16 August 2008; 15:20	Report	Score by quarters: 4–4, 1–5, 4–2, 3–2			Ying Tung Natatorium, Beijing; Referees: Klopper (NED), Rak (CRO)
16 August 2008; 15:20	Report	Figlioli 3, Whalan 2	Goals	Molnár 3, Kiss 2, Biros 2, Kis 2	Ying Tung Natatorium, Beijing; Referees: Klopper (NED), Rak (CRO)

18 August 2008; 10:50	Report	Hungary	12–3	Canada	Ying Tung Natatorium, Beijing; Referees: Ciric (SRB), Littlejohn (GBR)
18 August 2008; 10:50	Report	Score by quarters: 3–1, 3–0, 1–2, 5–0			Ying Tung Natatorium, Beijing; Referees: Ciric (SRB), Littlejohn (GBR)
18 August 2008; 10:50	Report	Madaras 2, Kásás 2, Biros 2, Molnár 2	Goals	Graham 2	Ying Tung Natatorium, Beijing; Referees: Ciric (SRB), Littlejohn (GBR)

18 August 2008; 12:10	Report	Montenegro	5–5	Australia	Ying Tung Natatorium, Beijing; Referees: Chaney (USA), Caputi (ITA)
18 August 2008; 12:10	Report	Score by quarters: 2–1, 1–2, 0–1, 2–1			Ying Tung Natatorium, Beijing; Referees: Chaney (USA), Caputi (ITA)
18 August 2008; 12:10	Report	Vukčević 1, M. Janović 1, Ivović 1, Zloković 1, Gojković 1	Goals	Campbell 1, Martin 1, McGregor 1, Woods 1, Beadsworth 1	Ying Tung Natatorium, Beijing; Referees: Chaney (USA), Caputi (ITA)

18 August 2008; 15:20	Report	Spain	10–6	Greece	Ying Tung Natatorium, Beijing; Referees: Rak (CRO), Simion (ROU)
18 August 2008; 15:20	Report	Score by quarters: 2–0, 3–0, 3–5, 2–1			Ying Tung Natatorium, Beijing; Referees: Rak (CRO), Simion (ROU)
18 August 2008; 15:20	Report	F. Perrone 7	Goals	Theodoropoulos 2	Ying Tung Natatorium, Beijing; Referees: Rak (CRO), Simion (ROU)

=== Group B ===
Team	Pld	W	D	L	GF	GA	GD	Pts	Qualification
United States	5	4	0	1	37	31	+6	8	Qualified for the semifinals
Croatia	5	4	0	1	56	31	+25	8	Qualified for the quarterfinals
Serbia	5	3	0	2	50	38	+12	6	Qualified for the quarterfinals
Germany	5	2	0	3	33	44	−11	4	Will play for places 7–10
Italy	5	2	0	3	57	50	+7	4	Will play for places 7–12
China	5	0	0	5	25	64	−39	0	Will play for places 7–12

10 August 2008; 12:10	Report	Serbia	11–7	Germany	Ying Tung Natatorium, Beijing; Referees: Tulga (TUR), Littlejohn (GBR)
10 August 2008; 12:10	Report	Score by quarters: 1–3, 5–2, 2–2, 3–0			Ying Tung Natatorium, Beijing; Referees: Tulga (TUR), Littlejohn (GBR)
10 August 2008; 12:10	Report	Pijetlović 4, Udovičić 2, Šapić 2	Goals	Politze 2, Mackeben 2	Ying Tung Natatorium, Beijing; Referees: Tulga (TUR), Littlejohn (GBR)

10 August 2008; 15:20	Report	Croatia	11–7	Italy	Ying Tung Natatorium, Beijing; Referees: Simion (ROU), Antsiferov (RUS)
10 August 2008; 15:20	Report	Score by quarters: 3–3, 2–0, 4–1, 2–3			Ying Tung Natatorium, Beijing; Referees: Simion (ROU), Antsiferov (RUS)
10 August 2008; 15:20	Report	Bošković 3, Bušlje 2, Marković 2	Goals	Felugo 3, Calcaterra 2	Ying Tung Natatorium, Beijing; Referees: Simion (ROU), Antsiferov (RUS)

10 August 2008; 16:40	Report	United States	8–4	China	Ying Tung Natatorium, Beijing; Referees: Balfanbayev (KAZ), Brguljan (MNE)
10 August 2008; 16:40	Report	Score by quarters: 3–1, 1–2, 2–1, 2–0			Ying Tung Natatorium, Beijing; Referees: Balfanbayev (KAZ), Brguljan (MNE)
10 August 2008; 16:40	Report	Azevedo 5, Beaubien 2	Goals	Wang B. 2	Ying Tung Natatorium, Beijing; Referees: Balfanbayev (KAZ), Brguljan (MNE)

12 August 2008; 12:10	Report	Italy	11–12	United States	Ying Tung Natatorium, Beijing; Referees: Brguljan (MNE), Patelli (BRA)
12 August 2008; 12:10	Report	Score by quarters: 1–2, 2–3, 4–3, 4–4			Ying Tung Natatorium, Beijing; Referees: Brguljan (MNE), Patelli (BRA)
12 August 2008; 12:10	Report	Gallo 3, Felugo 3, Calcaterra 2, Sottani 2	Goals	Powers 3, Azevedo 2	Ying Tung Natatorium, Beijing; Referees: Brguljan (MNE), Patelli (BRA)

12 August 2008; 15:20	Report	Serbia	8–11	Croatia	Ying Tung Natatorium, Beijing; Referees: Turcotte (CAN), Klopper (NED)
12 August 2008; 15:20	Report	Score by quarters: 3–1, 1–4, 1–4, 3–2			Ying Tung Natatorium, Beijing; Referees: Turcotte (CAN), Klopper (NED)
12 August 2008; 15:20	Report	Šapić 4, Udovičić 2	Goals	Joković 3, Barač 3, Smodlaka 2	Ying Tung Natatorium, Beijing; Referees: Turcotte (CAN), Klopper (NED)

12 August 2008; 16:40	Report	Germany	6–5	China	Ying Tung Natatorium, Beijing; Referees: Moliner Molins (ESP), Hart (AUS)
12 August 2008; 16:40	Report	Score by quarters: 0–2, 5–2, 0–0, 1–1			Ying Tung Natatorium, Beijing; Referees: Moliner Molins (ESP), Hart (AUS)
12 August 2008; 16:40	Report	Savić 2, Schertwitis 2	Goals	Yu 2	Ying Tung Natatorium, Beijing; Referees: Moliner Molins (ESP), Hart (AUS)

14 August 2008; 9:30	Report	Croatia	13–5	Germany	Ying Tung Natatorium, Beijing; Referees: Moliner Molins (ESP), Argyros (GRE)
14 August 2008; 9:30	Report	Score by quarters: 4–1, 3–2, 2–1, 4–1			Ying Tung Natatorium, Beijing; Referees: Moliner Molins (ESP), Argyros (GRE)
14 August 2008; 9:30	Report	Burić 3, Joković 2, Smodlaka 2, Marković 2, Bošković 2	Goals	Politze 2	Ying Tung Natatorium, Beijing; Referees: Moliner Molins (ESP), Argyros (GRE)

14 August 2008; 10:50	Report	United States	2–4	Serbia	Ying Tung Natatorium, Beijing; Referees: Antsiferov (RUS), Littlejohn (GBR)
14 August 2008; 10:50	Report	Score by quarters: 0–0, 1–2, 0–2, 1–0			Ying Tung Natatorium, Beijing; Referees: Antsiferov (RUS), Littlejohn (GBR)
14 August 2008; 10:50	Report	Varellas 2	Goals	Udovičić 1, Pijetlović 1, Šapić 1, Vujasinović 1	Ying Tung Natatorium, Beijing; Referees: Antsiferov (RUS), Littlejohn (GBR)

14 August 2008; 16:40	Report	China	7–19	Italy	Ying Tung Natatorium, Beijing; Referees: Kiszelly (HUN), Koryzna (POL)
14 August 2008; 16:40	Report	Score by quarters: 2–5, 2–5, 1–4, 2–5			Ying Tung Natatorium, Beijing; Referees: Kiszelly (HUN), Koryzna (POL)
14 August 2008; 16:40	Report	Xie 3, Han 2	Goals	Calcaterra 4, Gallo 3, Angelini 3, Di Costanzo 2, Felugo 2, Mistrangelo 2	Ying Tung Natatorium, Beijing; Referees: Kiszelly (HUN), Koryzna (POL)

16 August 2008; 9:30	Report	Germany	8–7	Italy	Ying Tung Natatorium, Beijing; Referees: Brguljan (MNE), Turcotte (CAN)
16 August 2008; 9:30	Report	Score by quarters: 2–1, 3–1, 0–2, 3–3			Ying Tung Natatorium, Beijing; Referees: Brguljan (MNE), Turcotte (CAN)
16 August 2008; 9:30	Report	Schertwitis 2	Goals	Calcaterra 3	Ying Tung Natatorium, Beijing; Referees: Brguljan (MNE), Turcotte (CAN)

16 August 2008; 12:10	Report	Croatia	5–7	United States	Ying Tung Natatorium, Beijing; Referees: Simion (ROU), Antsiferov (RUS)
16 August 2008; 12:10	Report	Score by quarters: 2–2, 1–3, 0–0, 2–2			Ying Tung Natatorium, Beijing; Referees: Simion (ROU), Antsiferov (RUS)
16 August 2008; 12:10	Report	Đogaš 2	Goals	Azevedo 3	Ying Tung Natatorium, Beijing; Referees: Simion (ROU), Antsiferov (RUS)

16 August 2008; 16:40	Report	Serbia	15–5	China	Ying Tung Natatorium, Beijing; Referees: Koryzna (POL), Oshima (JPN)
16 August 2008; 16:40	Report	Score by quarters: 5–2, 2–1, 4–2, 4–0			Ying Tung Natatorium, Beijing; Referees: Koryzna (POL), Oshima (JPN)
16 August 2008; 16:40	Report	Šapić 9, Vujasinović 3	Goals	Liang 3, Xie 2	Ying Tung Natatorium, Beijing; Referees: Koryzna (POL), Oshima (JPN)

18 August 2008; 9:30	Report	Serbia	12–13	Italy	Ying Tung Natatorium, Beijing; Referees: Klopper (NED), Antsiferov (RUS)
18 August 2008; 9:30	Report	Score by quarters: 3–3, 2–3, 3–5, 4–2			Ying Tung Natatorium, Beijing; Referees: Klopper (NED), Antsiferov (RUS)
18 August 2008; 9:30	Report	Šapić 3, Prlainović 2, Filipović 2, Vujasinović 2	Goals	Calcaterra 3, Felugo 2, Bencivenga 2, Sottani 2	Ying Tung Natatorium, Beijing; Referees: Klopper (NED), Antsiferov (RUS)

18 August 2008; 14:00	Report	United States	8–7	Germany	Ying Tung Natatorium, Beijing; Referees: Margeta (SLO), Kiszelly (HUN)
18 August 2008; 14:00	Report	Score by quarters: 3–2, 2–1, 2–2, 1–2			Ying Tung Natatorium, Beijing; Referees: Margeta (SLO), Kiszelly (HUN)
18 August 2008; 14:00	Report	Powers 2, Wright 2	Goals	Nossek 5	Ying Tung Natatorium, Beijing; Referees: Margeta (SLO), Kiszelly (HUN)

18 August 2008; 16:40	Report	China	4–16	Croatia	Ying Tung Natatorium, Beijing
18 August 2008; 16:40	Report	Score by quarters: 0–4, 0–3, 1–1, 3–8			Ying Tung Natatorium, Beijing
18 August 2008; 16:40	Report	Wu 2	Goals	Barač 4, Joković 3, Đogaš 2, Marković 2, Hinić 2	Ying Tung Natatorium, Beijing

== Classification round ==
Bracket

7th–12th
B5	Italy	13
A6	Canada	11
A5	Greece	13
B6	China	8

7th–10th
A4	Australia	17
B5	Italy	16
B4	Germany	9
A5	Greece	13
11th–12th
11	Canada	8
12	China	7

7th–8th
8	Australia	8
7	Greece	9
9th–10th
9	Italy	10
10	Germany	8

=== Classification 7th–12th ===
20 August 2008; 09:30	Report	Canada	11–13	Italy	Ying Tung Natatorium, Beijing; Referees: Rak (CRO), Ni (CHN)
20 August 2008; 09:30	Report	Score by quarters: 1–4, 3–2, 3–3, 4–4			Ying Tung Natatorium, Beijing; Referees: Rak (CRO), Ni (CHN)
20 August 2008; 09:30	Report	Graham 4, Miller 2	Goals	Sottani 3, Gallo 2, Felugo 2, Calcaterra 2	Ying Tung Natatorium, Beijing; Referees: Rak (CRO), Ni (CHN)

20 August 2008; 10:50	Report	Greece	13–8	China	Ying Tung Natatorium, Beijing; Referees: Balfanbayev (KAZ), Knights (NZL)
20 August 2008; 10:50	Report	Score by quarters: 3–1, 4–4, 2–0, 4–3			Ying Tung Natatorium, Beijing; Referees: Balfanbayev (KAZ), Knights (NZL)
20 August 2008; 10:50	Report	Ntoskas 4, G. Afroudakis 3, C. Afroudakis 2	Goals	Xie 3, Wang Yo. 2	Ying Tung Natatorium, Beijing; Referees: Balfanbayev (KAZ), Knights (NZL)

=== Classification 11th–12th ===
22 August 2008; 09:30	Report	Canada	8–7	China	Ying Tung Natatorium, Beijing; Referees: Koryzna (POL), Argyros (GRE)
22 August 2008; 09:30	Report	Score by quarters: 1–1, 3–1, 1–2, 3–3			Ying Tung Natatorium, Beijing; Referees: Koryzna (POL), Argyros (GRE)
22 August 2008; 09:30	Report	Boyd 2, Sayegh 2	Goals	Yu 2, Han 2	Ying Tung Natatorium, Beijing; Referees: Koryzna (POL), Argyros (GRE)

=== Classification 7th–10th ===
22 August 2008; 10:50	Report	Australia	17–16 (OT)	Italy	Ying Tung Natatorium, Beijing; Referees: Moliner Molins (ESP), Chaney (USA)
22 August 2008; 10:50	Report	Score by quarters: 4–2, 1–5, 4–0, 1–3 OT: 0–1, 3–2, 4–3 (PS)			Ying Tung Natatorium, Beijing; Referees: Moliner Molins (ESP), Chaney (USA)
22 August 2008; 10:50	Report	McGregor 3, Franklin 2, Figlioli 2, Maitland 2, Martin 2, Whalan 2	Goals	Calcaterra 6, Gallo 2, Felugo 2, Angelini 2, Sottani 2	Ying Tung Natatorium, Beijing; Referees: Moliner Molins (ESP), Chaney (USA)

22 August 2008; 17:00	Report	Germany	9–13	Greece	Ying Tung Natatorium, Beijing; Referees: Ciric (SRB), Patelli (BRA)
22 August 2008; 17:00	Report	Score by quarters: 3–3, 1–3, 2–4, 3–3			Ying Tung Natatorium, Beijing; Referees: Ciric (SRB), Patelli (BRA)
22 August 2008; 17:00	Report	Nossek 3, Schertwitis 2, Kreuzmann 2	Goals	Ntoskas 6, Schizas 3, Theodoropoulos 2	Ying Tung Natatorium, Beijing; Referees: Ciric (SRB), Patelli (BRA)

=== Classification 9th–10th ===
24 August 2008; 09:30	Report	Italy	10–8	Germany	Ying Tung Natatorium, Beijing; Referees: Rak (CRO), Hart (AUS)
24 August 2008; 09:30	Report	Score by quarters: 4–3, 1–1, 1–1, 4–3			Ying Tung Natatorium, Beijing; Referees: Rak (CRO), Hart (AUS)
24 August 2008; 09:30	Report	Calcaterra 5, Gallo 2, Angelini 2	Goals	Savic 2, Schertwitis 2, Schlotterbeck 2	Ying Tung Natatorium, Beijing; Referees: Rak (CRO), Hart (AUS)

=== Classification 7th–8th ===
24 August 2008; 10:50	Report	Australia	8–9	Greece	Ying Tung Natatorium, Beijing; Referees: Simion (ROU), Pinker (RSA)
24 August 2008; 10:50	Report	Score by quarters: 2–3, 2–2, 3–1, 1–3			Ying Tung Natatorium, Beijing; Referees: Simion (ROU), Pinker (RSA)
24 August 2008; 10:50	Report	Figlioli 3, Campbell 2, Martin 2	Goals	Schizas 2, C. Afroudakis 2	Ying Tung Natatorium, Beijing; Referees: Simion (ROU), Pinker (RSA)

== Medal round ==
Bracket

Quarterfinals
B2	Croatia	6
A3	Montenegro	7
A2	Spain	5
B3	Serbia	9

Semifinals
A1	Hungary	11
A3	Montenegro	9
B1	United States	10
B3	Serbia	5
5th–6th
5	Spain	11
6	Croatia	9

Gold medal game
Hungary	14
United States	10
Bronze medal game
Serbia	6
4	Montenegro	4

=== Quarterfinals ===
20 August 2008; 16:00	Report	Montenegro	7–6	Croatia	Ying Tung Natatorium, Beijing; Referees: Tulga (TUR), Bock (GER)
20 August 2008; 16:00	Report	Score by quarters: 3–1, 2–3, 1–0, 1–2			Ying Tung Natatorium, Beijing; Referees: Tulga (TUR), Bock (GER)
20 August 2008; 16:00	Report	N. Janović 2, Ivović 2, Gojković 2	Goals	Hinić 2	Ying Tung Natatorium, Beijing; Referees: Tulga (TUR), Bock (GER)

20 August 2008; 17:20	Report	Spain	5–9	Serbia	Ying Tung Natatorium, Beijinb; Referees: Turcotte (CAN), Klopper (NED)
20 August 2008; 17:20	Report	Score by quarters: 1–0, 1–5, 1–2, 2–2			Ying Tung Natatorium, Beijinb; Referees: Turcotte (CAN), Klopper (NED)
20 August 2008; 17:20	Report	Molina 2	Goals	Pijetlović 4, Ćirić 2, Vujasinović 2	Ying Tung Natatorium, Beijinb; Referees: Turcotte (CAN), Klopper (NED)

=== Classification 5th–6th ===
24 August 2008; 13:00	Report	Croatia	9–11	Spain	Ying Tung Natatorium, Beijing; Referees: Chaney (USA), Kiszelly (HUN)
24 August 2008; 13:00	Report	Score by quarters: 2–0, 3–5, 1–3, 3–3			Ying Tung Natatorium, Beijing; Referees: Chaney (USA), Kiszelly (HUN)
24 August 2008; 13:00	Report	Bušlje 2, Đogaš 2	Goals	X. García 4, Minguell 3, F. Perrone 2	Ying Tung Natatorium, Beijing; Referees: Chaney (USA), Kiszelly (HUN)

=== Semifinals ===
22 August 2008; 18:20	Report	Hungary	11–9	Montenegro	Ying Tung Natatorium, Beijing; Referees: Simion (ROU), Tulga (TUR)
22 August 2008; 18:20	Report	Score by quarters: 3–4, 3–3, 3–0, 2–2			Ying Tung Natatorium, Beijing; Referees: Simion (ROU), Tulga (TUR)
22 August 2008; 18:20	Report	Kiss 3, Madaras 2	Goals	N. Janović 2, Uskoković 2, Gojković 2	Ying Tung Natatorium, Beijing; Referees: Simion (ROU), Tulga (TUR)

22 August 2008; 19:40	Report	United States	10–5	Serbia	Ying Tung Natatorium, Beijing; Referees: Turcotte (CAN), Margeta (SLO)
22 August 2008; 19:40	Report	Score by quarters: 3–3, 2–1, 2–1, 3–0			Ying Tung Natatorium, Beijing; Referees: Turcotte (CAN), Margeta (SLO)
22 August 2008; 19:40	Report	Azevedo 3, Beaubien 2, Bailey 2	Goals	Pijetlović 2, Vujasinović 2	Ying Tung Natatorium, Beijing; Referees: Turcotte (CAN), Margeta (SLO)

=== Bronze medal game ===
24 August 2008; 14:20	Report	Montenegro	4–6	Serbia (bronze)	Ying Tung Natatorium, Beijing; Referees: Tulga (TUR), Margeta (SLO)
24 August 2008; 14:20	Report	Score by quarters: 0–2, 1–2, 1–2, 2–0			Ying Tung Natatorium, Beijing; Referees: Tulga (TUR), Margeta (SLO)
24 August 2008; 14:20	Report	M. Janović 2	Goals	Savić 2	Ying Tung Natatorium, Beijing; Referees: Tulga (TUR), Margeta (SLO)

=== Gold medal game ===
24 August 2008; 15:40	Report	(gold) Hungary	14–10	United States (silver)	Ying Tung Natatorium, Beijing; Referees: Turcotte (CAN), Brguljan (MNE)
24 August 2008; 15:40	Report	Score by quarters: 6–4, 3–4, 2–1, 3–1			Ying Tung Natatorium, Beijing; Referees: Turcotte (CAN), Brguljan (MNE)
24 August 2008; 15:40	Report	Dá. Varga 3, Biros 3, Dé. Varga 2	Goals	Azevedo 4, Beaubien 2, Smith 2	Ying Tung Natatorium, Beijing; Referees: Turcotte (CAN), Brguljan (MNE)

== Ranking and statistics ==
=== Final rankings ===
Rank	Team
Gold medal	Hungary
Silver medal	United States
Bronze medal	Serbia
4.	Montenegro
5.	Spain
6.	Croatia
7.	Greece
8.	Australia
9.	Italy
10.	Germany
11.	Canada
12.	China

2008 men's Olympic champions

Hungary
Ninth title

=== Multi-time Olympians ===
Five-time Olympian(s): 1 player

- Hungary: Tibor Benedek

Four-time Olympian(s): 10 players

- Croatia: Igor Hinić
- Greece: Georgios Afroudakis
- Hungary: Tamás Kásás
- Italy: Alberto Angelini, Fabio Bencivenga, Alessandro Calcaterra
- Serbia: Aleksandar Šapić, Dejan Savić, Vladimir Vujasinović
- Spain: Ángel Andreo (GK)

=== Multiple medalists ===
Three-time Olympic medalist(s): 10 players

- Hungary: Tibor Benedek, Péter Biros, Tamás Kásás, Gergely Kiss, Tamás Molnár, Zoltán Szécsi (GK)
- Serbia: Aleksandar Ćirić, Aleksandar Šapić, Dejan Savić, Vladimir Vujasinović

=== Leading goalscorers ===
Rank	Player	Team	Goals	Matches played	Goals per match	Shots	%
1	Alessandro Calcaterra	Italy	27	8	3.375	51	52.9%
2	Georgios Ntoskas	Greece	20	8	2.500	48	41.7%
2	Aleksandar Šapić	Serbia	20	8	2.500	56	35.7%
4	Tony Azevedo	United States	17	7	2.429	40	42.5%
5	Maurizio Felugo	Italy	16	8	2.000	41	39.0%
5	Pietro Figlioli	Australia	16	7	2.286	44	36.4%
5	Felipe Perrone	Spain	16	7	2.286	39	41.0%
8	Valentino Gallo	Italy	15	8	1.875	31	48.4%
9	Xavier García	Spain	14	7	2.000	36	38.9%
10	Péter Biros	Hungary	13	7	1.857	23	56.5%
10	Mlađan Janović	Montenegro	13	8	1.625	38	34.2%
10	Guillermo Molina	Spain	13	7	1.857	37	35.1%

Source: Official Results Book (page 179)

=== Leading goalkeepers ===
Rank	Goalkeeper	Team	Saves	Matches played	Saves per match	Shots	%
1	Stefano Tempesti	Italy	83	8	10.375	169	49.1%
2	Merrill Moses	United States	70	7	10.000	117	59.8%
3	Alexander Tchigir	Germany	63	7	9.000	130	48.5%
4	Iñaki Aguilar	Spain	58	7	8.286	107	54.2%
4	Ge Weiqing	China	58	7	8.286	143	40.6%
6	Slobodan Soro	Serbia	57	8	7.125	93	61.3%
7	Robin Randall	Canada	55	7	7.857	129	42.6%
8	Miloš Šćepanović	Montenegro	49	8	6.125	99	49.5%
8	Frano Vićan	Croatia	49	7	7.000	94	52.1%
10	James Stanton	Australia	48	7	6.857	109	44.0%

Source: Official Results Book (page 175)

=== Leading sprinters ===
Rank	Sprinter	Team	Sprints won	Matches played	Sprints won per match	Sprints contested	%
1	Pietro Figlioli	Australia	21	7	3.000	23	91.3%
2	Kevin Graham	Canada	18	7	2.571	23	78.3%
3	Maro Joković	Croatia	16	7	2.286	21	76.2%
4	Tamás Kásás	Hungary	10	7	1.429	12	83.3%
5	Aleksandar Ćirić	Serbia	9	8	1.125	12	75.0%
6	Filip Filipović	Serbia	8	8	1.000	15	53.3%
6	Tobias Kreuzmann	Germany	8	7	1.143	12	66.7%
6	Moritz Oeler	Germany	8	7	1.143	16	50.0%
6	Peter Varellas	United States	8	7	1.143	18	44.4%

Source: Official Results Book (page 178)

== Awards ==
Media All-Star Team

- Goalkeeper
  - (United States) Merrill Moses (70 saves)
- Field players
  - (United States) Tony Azevedo (17 goals, 2 sprints won)
  - (Hungary) Péter Biros (13 goals, 3 sprints won)
  - (Italy) Alessandro Calcaterra (centre forward, 27 goals)
  - (Montenegro) Mlađan Janović (13 goals, 5 sprints won)
  - (Spain) Felipe Perrone (16 goals)
  - (Hungary) Dániel Varga (8 goals)

== See also ==
- Water polo at the 2008 Summer Olympics – Women's tournament

== Sources ==
- PDF documents in the LA84 Foundation Digital Library:
  - Official Results Book – 2008 Olympic Games – Water Polo (download, archive)
- Water polo on the Olympedia website
  - Water polo at the 2008 Summer Olympics (men's tournament)
- Water polo on the Sports Reference website
  - Water polo at the 2008 Summer Games (men's tournament) (archived)
