= Water polo at the 2008 Summer Olympics – Qualification =

Twelve men's teams and eight women's teams qualified for Water polo at the 2008 Summer Olympics.

== Men ==
Water Polo Men	Date	Host	Vacancies	Qualified
Host nation	–	–	1	China
2007 FINA World Championships	Mar 17 – Apr 1, 2007	(Australia) Melbourne	3	Croatia; Hungary; Spain
2007 World League	Jul 3 – Aug 12, 2007	(Germany) Berlin^	1	Serbia
European Qualification Tournament	Sep 2–9, 2007	(Slovakia) Bratislava	1	Montenegro
2007 Pan American Games	Jul 13–29, 2007	(Brazil) Rio de Janeiro	1	United States
Oceania Qualification Tournament	Nov 30 – Dec 2, 2007	(New Zealand) Auckland	1	Australia
Olympic Qualification Tournament	Mar 2–9, 2008	(Romania) Oradea	4	Germany; Italy; Greece; Canada
TOTAL			12	

^Berlin is the host of the super-final only.

== Women ==
Water Polo Women	Date	Host	Vacancies	Qualified
Host nation	–	–	1	China
European Qualification Tournament	Aug 19–26, 2007	(Russia) Kirishi	1	Netherlands
2007 Pan American Games	Jul 13–29, 2007	(Brazil) Rio de Janeiro	1	United States
Oceania Qualification Tournament	Dec 17–19, 2007	(Australia) Brisbane	1	Australia
Olympic Qualification Tournament	Feb 17–24, 2008	(Italy) Imperia	4	Italy; Russia; Hungary; Greece
TOTAL			8	
