= Canada men's national water polo team =

Men's national water polo team representing Canada

Canada
- FINA code: CAN
- Association: Water Polo Canada
- Confederation: UANA (Americas)
- Head coach: Patrick Oaten
- Asst coach: Gyula Tóth
- Captain: Bogdan Djerkovic

FINA ranking (since 2008)
- Current: 19 (as of August 9, 2021)
- Highest: 7 (2015)

Olympic Games (team statistics)
- Appearances: 4 (first in 1972)
- Best result: 9th place (1976)

World Championship
- Appearances: 19 (first in 1975)
- Best result: 8th place (2009)

World League
- Appearances: 12 (first in 2005)
- Best result: 6th place (2008, 2014)

Pan American Games
- Appearances: 15 (first in 1963)
- Best result: (silver) (2011, 2019)

ASUA Cup (UANA Cup)
- Best result: (gold) (2011, 2013, 2015)

Commonwealth Championship
- Appearances: 2 (first in 2002)
- Best result: (gold) (2002)

Media
- Website: waterpolo.ca

The Canada men's national water polo team represents Canada in international men's water polo competitions and friendly matches. The team is overseen by Water Polo Canada, a member of the Fédération Internationale de Natation (FINA). The team qualified for the 2008 Summer Olympics in Beijing, PR China by finishing fourth at 2008 Olympic Qualifying Tournament in Romania.

== Results ==
=== Olympic Games ===
- 1972 – 16th place
- 1976 – 9th place
- 1984 – 10th place
- 2008 – 11th place

=== World Championship ===
- 1975 – 14th place
- 1978 – 14th place
- 1982 – 14th place
- 1986 – 13th place
- 1991 – 13th place
- 1994 – 14th place
- 1998 – 13th place
- 2001 – 15th place
- 2003 – 14th place
- 2005 – 13th place
- 2007 – 12th place
- 2009 – 8th place
- 2011 – 10th place
- 2013 – 11th place
- 2015 – 9th place
- 2017 – 15th place
- 2022 – Withdrew
- 2023 – 12th place
- 2025 – 11th place

=== FINA World League ===
- 2005 – Semifinal round
- 2006 – 9th place
- 2007 – 7th place
- 2008 – 6th place
- 2011 – 7th place
- 2012 – Intercontinental Preliminary round
- 2013 – Intercontinental Preliminary round
- 2014 – 6th place
- 2015 – Intercontinental Preliminary round
- 2018 – Intercontinental Preliminary round
- 2019 – 8th place
- 2022 – 8th place

=== Pan American Games ===
- 1963 – 4th place
- 1967 – 5th place
- 1971 – 5th place
- 1975 – 4th place
- 1979 – (bronze) Bronze medal
- 1983 – (bronze) Bronze medal
- 1987 – 4th place
- 1991 – 4th place
- 1995 – 5th place
- 1999 – (bronze) Bronze medal
- 2003 – (bronze) Bronze medal
- 2007 – (bronze) Bronze medal
- 2011 – (silver) Silver medal
- 2015 – (bronze) Bronze medal
- 2019 – (silver) Silver medal

=== ASUA Cup (UANA Cup) ===
- 2011 – (gold) Gold medal
- 2013a – (gold) Gold medal
- 2013b – (silver) Silver medal
- 2015 – (gold) Gold medal
- 2017 – (silver) Silver medal
- 2019 – (bronze) Bronze medal
- 2023 – (gold) Gold medal

=== Commonwealth Championship ===
- 2002 – (gold) Gold medal
- 2006 – (silver) Silver medal

== Team ==
=== Current squad ===
Roster for the 2025 World Championships.

Head coach: Patrick Oaten

- 1 Milan Radenovic GK
- 2 Ali Oussadou FP
- 3 Bogdan Djerkovic FP
- 4 Jérémie Côté FP
- 5 Nikos Gerakoudis FP
- 6 David Lapins FP
- 7 Roko Pozaric FP
- 8 Bor Tanasijevic FP
- 9 Aleksa Gardijan FP
- 10 Aria Soleimanipak FP
- 11 Jason O'Donnell FP
- 12 Reuel D'Souza FP
- 13 Brody McKnight GK
- 14 Andrej Gavric FP
- 15 Leo Hachem FP

=== Past squads ===
- 1972 Olympic Games
  - Clifford Barry, Gabor Csepregi, Jack Gauldie, David Hart, Stephen Hart, Guy Leclerc, Donald Packer, William van der Pol, Patrick Pugliese, Allan Pyle and Robert Thompson.
- 1976 Olympic Games
  - Clifford Barry, Gábor Csepregi, Dominique Dion, Jim Ducharme, George Gross, David Hart, Guy Leclerc, John MacLeod, Paul Pottier, Patrick Pugliese, and Gaétan Turcotte, Head Coach - Desző Lemhényi, Manager & Assistant Coach - Iván Somlai
- 1984 Olympic Games
  - John Anderson, Rene Bol, Geoff Brown, Brian Collyer, Simon Deschamps, Dominique Dion, George Gross, Sylvain Huet, Alexander Juhasz, Bill Meyer, Paul Pottier, Gordon Vantol, and Rick Zayonc. Coaching Staff: Head Coach Gabor Csepregi; Assistant Coaches Robert Thompson and David Hart; Manager John MacMaster.
- 1999 Pan American Games
  - Ted Bader, Mark Block, Darryl Bourne (captain), Zoltan Csepregi, Adam Deffett, Kent Hardisty, Garrett Head, Yannick Lize, Chris Lovett, Nathaniel Miller, Mikael Sabo, Adam Sidky, Alex Thibeault. Head Coach: John Csikos.
- 2003 World Championship
  - David Allan, Vladimir Ćosić, Adam Defett, Aaron Feltham, Michael Gordon, Garrett Head, Iain Lark, Dušan Lazarević, Thomas Marks, Nathaniel Miller, Noah Miller, Kevin Mitchell, and Andrey Shevstov. Head Coach: John Csikos.
- 2003 Pan American Games
  - Vladimir Ćosić, Adam Defett, Michael Gordon, Kent Hardisty, Garrett Head, Iain Lark, Dušan Lazarević, Thomas Marks, Nathaniel Miller, Noah Miller, Kevin Mitchell, Mikael Sabo, and Nic Youngblud. Head Coach: John Csikos.
- 2005 World Championship
  - Aaron Feltham, Kevin Graham, Clem Hui, Brandon Jung, Iain Lark, Thomas Marks, Nathaniel Miller, Noah Miller, Kevin Mitchell, Jean Sayegh, Daniel Stein, Alexandre Thibeault, and Nic Youngblud. Head Coach: Dragan Jovanović.
- 2007 FINA World League
  - Brandon Jung, Aaron Feltham, Kevin Graham, Con Kudaba, Thomas Marks, Nathaniel Miller, Noah Miller, Kevin Mitchell, Jean Sayegh, Robin Randall, Andrew Robinson, Daniel Stein, and Nic Youngblud. Head Coach: Dragan Jovanović.
- 2007 Pan American Games
  - Robin Randall, Con Kudaba, Andrew Robinson, Kevin Mitchell, Kevin Graham, Thomas Marks (captain), Brandon Jung, Daniel Stein, Aaron Feltham, Noah Miller, Jean Sayegh, Nathaniel Miller, and Nic Youngblud. Head Coach: Dragan Jovanović.
- 2008 Olympic Qualifying Tournament
  - Robin Randall, Con Kudaba, Devon Diggle, Kevin Mitchell, Justin Boyd, Thomas Marks, Brandon Jung, Kevin Graham, Aaron Feltham, Sasa Palamarevic, Jean Sayegh, Nathaniel Miller, and Nic Youngblud. Head Coach: Dragan Jovanović.
- 2008 Olympic Games
  - Justin Boyd, Devon Diggle, Aaron Feltham, Kevin Graham, Brandon Jung, Con Kudaba, Thomas Marks, Nathaniel Miller, Kevin Mitchell, Sasa Palamarevic, Robin Randall, Jean Sayegh, and Nic Youngblud. Head Coach: Dragan Jovanović.

== See also ==
- Canada men's Olympic water polo team records and statistics
- Canada women's national water polo team
