= Sasa Palamarevic =

Canadian water polo player (born 1986)

Personal information
- Nationality: Canada
- Born: 16 July 1986 (age 40) Kakanj, SR Bosnia and Herzegovina, SFR Yugoslavia
- Height: 1.96 m (6 ft 5 in)
- Weight: 100 kg (220 lb)

Sport
- Sport: Water polo
- Position: Centre forward

Senior clubs
- Years: Team
- ?-?: Hull
National team
- Years: Team
- ?-?: Canada

Sasa Palamarevic (born 16 July 1986) is a Canadian water polo player. He was a member of the Canada national team, playing as a centre forward. He was a part of the team at the 2008 Summer Olympics. On club level, Palamarevic played for Hull in Canada.
