= John Anderson (water polo) =

Canadian water polo player (born 1962)

Personal information
- Full name: John Ross Anderson
- Born: September 4, 1962 (age 63) Toronto, Canada
- Education: UC Santa Barbara
- Height: 185 cm (6 ft 1 in)
- Weight: 86 kg (190 lb)
- Spouse: Karen Anderson

Sport
- Country: Canada
- Sport: Men's water polo
- Position: Field
- University team: UC Santa Barbara men's water polo
- Updated on 01:39, 21 September 2014 (UTC)

John Ross Anderson (born September 4, 1962) is a Canadian former water polo player who was a member of the Canada men's national water polo team who appeared in the 1984 Summer Olympics. 2018 - Inducted into the UCSB Athletics Hall of Fame.

== Early life and education ==
Anderson was born September 4, 1962, in Toronto, Canada. He enrolled at the University of California, Santa Barbara for college and played water polo for the UC Santa Barbara Gauchos. He played from 1984 through 1985 and was a two-time All American.

== Career ==
=== Club ===
Anderson played with the Harvard Water Polo Foundation and won two national championships. He later became president and general manager of the club.

=== International ===
Anderson was a member of the Canadian men's national water polo team for 16 years, highlighted by an appearance in the 1984 Summer Olympics in Los Angeles, California.
