= 2007 European Water Polo Olympic Qualification Tournament =

The 2007 Men's European Water Polo Olympic Qualification Tournament for the Games of the XXIX Olympiad in Beijing 2008 was held in Bratislava, Slovakia from September 2 to September 9, 2007. Croatia, Hungary, Spain and Serbia had already qualified for the Olympics, so they did not participate. Montenegro defeated Romania in the final and so earned a berth for the 2008 Summer Olympics Water Polo Competition.

== Preliminary round ==
=== Group A ===
| | Team | Points | G | W | D | L | GF | GA | Diff |
|---|---|---|---|---|---|---|---|---|---|
| 1. | Romania | 12 | 5 | 4 | 0 | 1 | 55 | 39 | +16 |
| 2. | Russia | 12 | 5 | 4 | 0 | 1 | 52 | 45 | +7 |
| 3. | Germany | 9 | 5 | 3 | 0 | 2 | 61 | 42 | +19 |
| 4. | North Macedonia | 6 | 5 | 2 | 0 | 3 | 45 | 53 | –8 |
| 5. | Slovakia | 6 | 5 | 2 | 0 | 3 | 41 | 44 | –3 |
| 6. | France | 6 | 5 | 0 | 0 | 5 | 37 | 68 | –31 |

- September 2, 2007

| Germany | 19 – 5 | France |
| Romania | 14 – 9 | North Macedonia |
| Russia | 9 – 8 | Slovakia |

- September 3, 2007

| France | 8 – 14 | Russia |
| North Macedonia | 10 – 8 | Slovakia |
| Romania | 7 – 10 | Germany |

- September 4, 2007

| Russia | 7 – 11 | Romania |
| Germany | 13 – 8 | North Macedonia |
| Slovakia | 10 – 8 | France |

- September 5, 2007

| North Macedonia | 11 – 9 | France |
| Romania | 9 – 6 | Slovakia |
| Germany | 11 – 13 | Russia |

- September 6, 2007

| Romania | 14 – 7 | France |
| Russia | 9 – 7 | North Macedonia |
| Slovakia | 9 – 8 | Germany |

=== Group B ===
| | Team | Points | G | W | D | L | GF | GA | Diff |
|---|---|---|---|---|---|---|---|---|---|
| 1. | Montenegro | 12 | 4 | 4 | 0 | 0 | 55 | 22 | +33 |
| 2. | Greece | 9 | 4 | 3 | 0 | 1 | 43 | 26 | +17 |
| 3. | Italy | 6 | 4 | 2 | 0 | 2 | 34 | 34 | 0 |
| 4. | Slovenia | 3 | 4 | 1 | 0 | 3 | 25 | 47 | –22 |
| 5. | Netherlands | 0 | 4 | 0 | 0 | 4 | 21 | 49 | –28 |

- September 2, 2007

| Greece | 13 – 4 | Slovenia |
| Italy | 8 – 12 | Montenegro |

- September 3, 2007

| Montenegro | 19 – 4 | Slovenia |
| Italy | 10 – 4 | Netherlands |

- September 4, 2007

| Montenegro | 9 – 5 | Greece |
| Slovenia | 9 – 5 | Netherlands |

- September 5, 2007

| Slovenia | 8 – 10 | Italy |
| Greece | 15 – 7 | Netherlands |

- September 6, 2007

| Netherlands | 5 – 15 | Montenegro |
| Greece | 10 – 6 | Italy |

== Finals ==
Semi-finals
September 8
Romania | 14
Greece | 13
September 8
Montenegro | 12
Russia | 5

Final
September 9
Romania | 8
Montenegro | 9
Third place
September 9
Greece | 5
Russia | 7

== Placement ==
=== 5th-8th ===
Placement Round 1
September 8
Germany | 11
Slovenia | 7
September 8
Italy | 12
North Macedonia | 5

Fifth Place
September 9
Germany | 6
Italy | 11
Seventh Place
September 9
Slovenia | 8
North Macedonia | 9

=== 9th-11th ===
Placement Round 1
September 8
France | 11
Netherlands | 10

Ninth Place
September 9
Slovakia | 10
France | 9

== Final ranking ==
| RANK | TEAM |
|---|---|
| 1. | Montenegro |
| 2. | Romania |
| 3. | Russia |
| 4. | Greece |
| 5. | Italy |
| 6. | Germany |
| 7. | North Macedonia |
| 8. | Slovenia |
| 9. | Slovakia |
| 10. | France |
| 11. | Netherlands |

- Montenegro qualified for the 2008 Summer Olympics in Beijing, PR China; Teams placed from 6th up to 2nd will play in the 2008 FINA Olympic Qualification Tournament in Oradea, Romania

== See also ==
- 2007 Women's European Water Polo Olympic Qualifier
