= Tim Neesham =

Australian water polo player

Personal information
- Born: 20 October 1979 (age 46) Fremantle, Western Australia, Australia

Sport
- Sport: Water polo
Medal record
Representing Australia
Commonwealth Championships
Silver medal – second place	2002 Manchester	Team competition

Timothy ("Tim") Paul Neesham (born 20 October 1979 in Fremantle, Western Australia) is an Australian water polo player. Neesham was part of Australia's Olympic squad for the 2000 Summer Olympics in Sydney and for the 2004 Summer Olympics in Athens. He was also a member of the Australian squad that finished 10th at the 2001 World Championships in Fukuoka and placed second at the 2002 Commonwealth Games in Manchester.

Neesham is a graduate of Aquinas College, Perth.
