= Water Polo Canada =

Canadian sports governing body

- Sport: Water polo
- Jurisdiction: National
- Founded: 1964
- Affiliation: FINA
- Headquarters: Ottawa
- Location: 1084 Kenaston Street
- President: Conrad Hadubiak
- CEO: Vacant
- Men's coach: Patrick Oaten
- Women's coach: David Paradelo

Official website
- www.waterpolo.ca
- (Canada)

Water Polo Canada, officially the Canadian Water Polo Association Inc., is the governing body of the sport of water polo in Canada and is a member of the World aquatics or (FINA). Water Polo Canada controls all water polo in the country and is responsible for hosting national championships and fielding national teams. The organization has its headquarters in Ottawa while its men's national team is based in Montreal and its women's national team is based in Montreal.

== History ==
Water polo was first introduced in Canada in 1886 at Lachine Quebec near Montreal in the St. Lawrence River as documented in a Boston, Globe article in 1888. Canadian men's championships were held in the Montreal area in the late 1890's with Grand Trunk winning the earliest recorded titles. The Montreal Amateur Athletic Association MAAA won titles in 1905 and 1906. In 1907, the Goulden Cup was donated by then President Chris Goulden for the Canadian men's title with the MAAA capturing the cup. The Goulden Cup remains one of the oldest sport trophies presented annually in Canadian sport. Until the 1960s, however, only Eastern-Canadian teams participated in the event. In 1964, the Canadian Water Polo Association was officially founded and had as its first president Frank Medek of Montreal. That year Canada hosted its first truly national club championship, which featured teams from Vancouver, Calgary, Manitoba, Ontario and Quebec. The tournament, held in Gravenhurst, was won by the Toronto Hungarians club. The following year the national championships left the east for the first time and were held in Edmonton. From 1966 to 1976, Dr. John Richardson was president of the Association. During this era Richardson oversaw Canada's participation in 3 Olympic Games.

During the 1970s and 1980s, water polo in Canada grew significantly and its national team programs expanded. Today, water polo is played in all ten provinces. In 2014, Water Polo Canada founded the National Championship League (NCL), a national domestic league which features 16U, 18U, 20U, and senior categories.

== Who can play water polo ==
Water polo can be enjoyed at the recreational level and at the competitive level by both male and female players.

== Affiliated organizations ==
Affiliated organizations
Affiliated organization	Website	Logo
Waterpolo Ontario	https://www.ontariowaterpolo.ca/
Waterpolo Quebec	https://wpq.quebec/
Waterpolo Alberta	https://albertawaterpolo.ca/
Waterpolo Saskatchewan	https://wpsask.ca/
Waterpolo New Brunswick	https://waterpolonb.ca/programs
Waterpolo West Bristish Columbia	https://www.waterpolowest.ca/
Manitoba Water Polo Association	https://www.manitobawaterpolo.com/

== NCL (National Championship League) ==
The National Championship League (NCL) was created in 2014 to bring the domestic club age group programs under a country wide umbrella that promotes the development of the sport. The NCL offers four categories of play: Senior, 20U, 18U, and 16U.

=== Senior ===
The Senior category runs from December to early May and features a format of separate event weekends. The country is split into Eastern and Western conferences and the standing from each event weekend determine who qualifies for the Senior National Championships, where the Canadian champions are crowned.

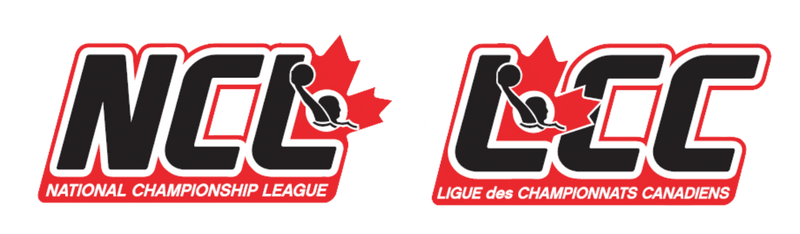
Ncl logo

Eastern events will be divided into two tiers. The tiers will maximize the number of meaningful games that are played through the course of a season. Promotion and relegation opportunities will exist at the end of each event and a playoff into the Senior National Championship qualifier will take place.

=== 19U ===
The 19U category will be a single event to act as National Club Championship. 19U teams are recommended to be joining the Senior divisions to access league play. Beyond that, Provinces and clubs provide 19U competitions of their own throughout Canada run independently of Water Polo Canada.

=== 17U ===
The 17U category runs from November to May and features a format of separate event weekends. The country is split into Eastern and Western conferences and the standing from each event weekend determine the rankings going into the Conference Championship weekends. These Conference Championship weekends, one for the Eastern teams and one for the Western teams, serve as the qualification for the 17U National Finals weekend with the top four teams from each Conference qualifying hosted in May. Eastern events will be divided into two tiers. The tiers will maximize the number of meaningful games that are played through the course of a season. Promotion and relegation opportunities will exist at the end of each event and a playoff into the 17U Eastern Finals will take place.

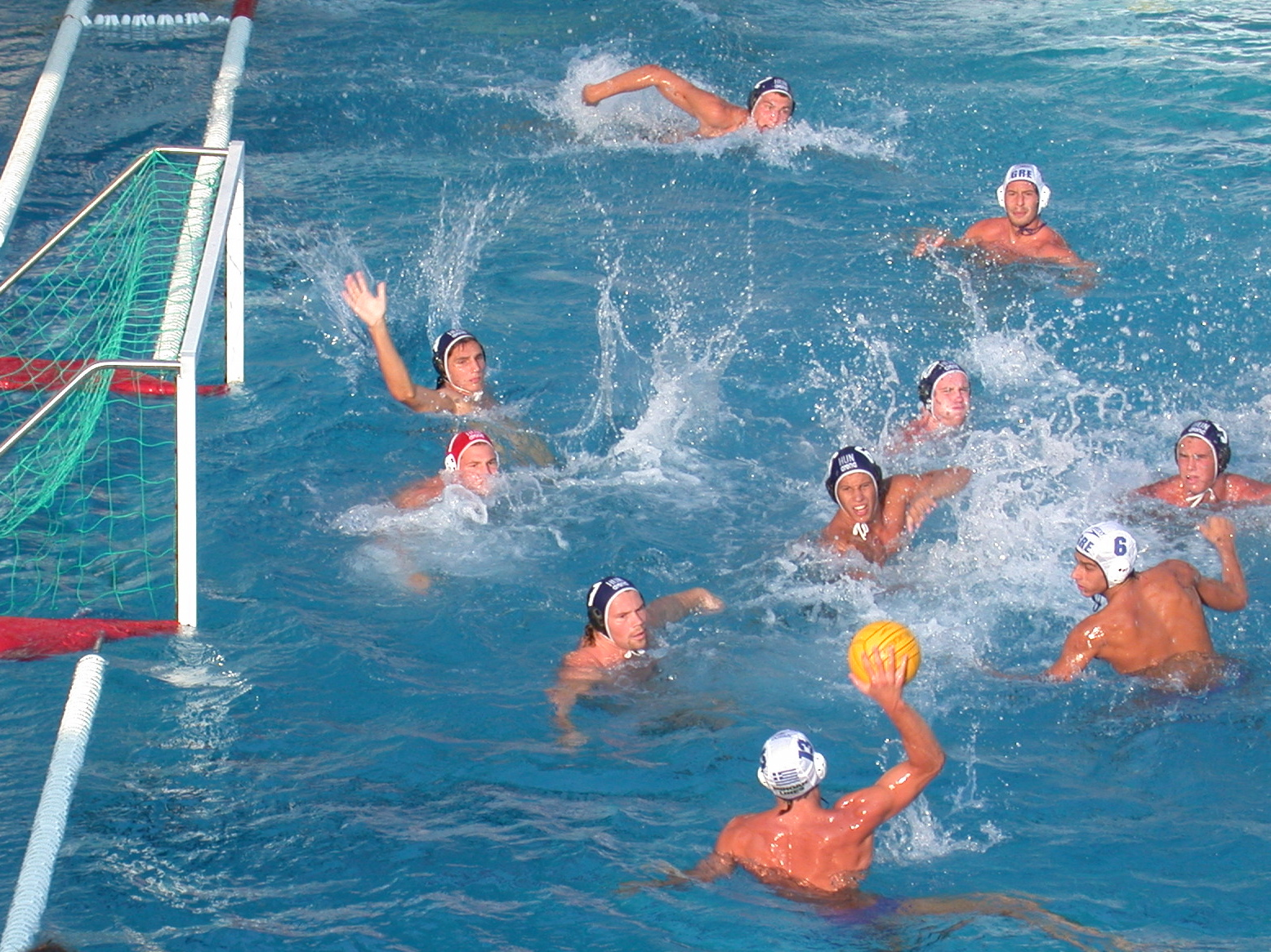

=== 15U ===
The 15U category, consists of two Championship events, an Eastern National Championship and a Western National Championship. The top 15U teams from each province, as determined by each Provincial Sport Organization, qualify for either the Eastern or Western National Championships depending on their region. The Eastern National Championship and Western National Championship are hosted by WPC in April/May of each year and determine the top 15U team in each half of the country.

== Teams ==
The Canadian water polo senior men's club championship, the Goulden Cup, is one of Canada's oldest amateur sporting events, having been contested since 1907. Water Polo Canada also stages national club championships for senior women (since 1977), junior men (since 1927), junior women (since 1985), 18U men (since 1985), 18U women (since 1987), 16U men (since 1995), and 16U women (since 1995).

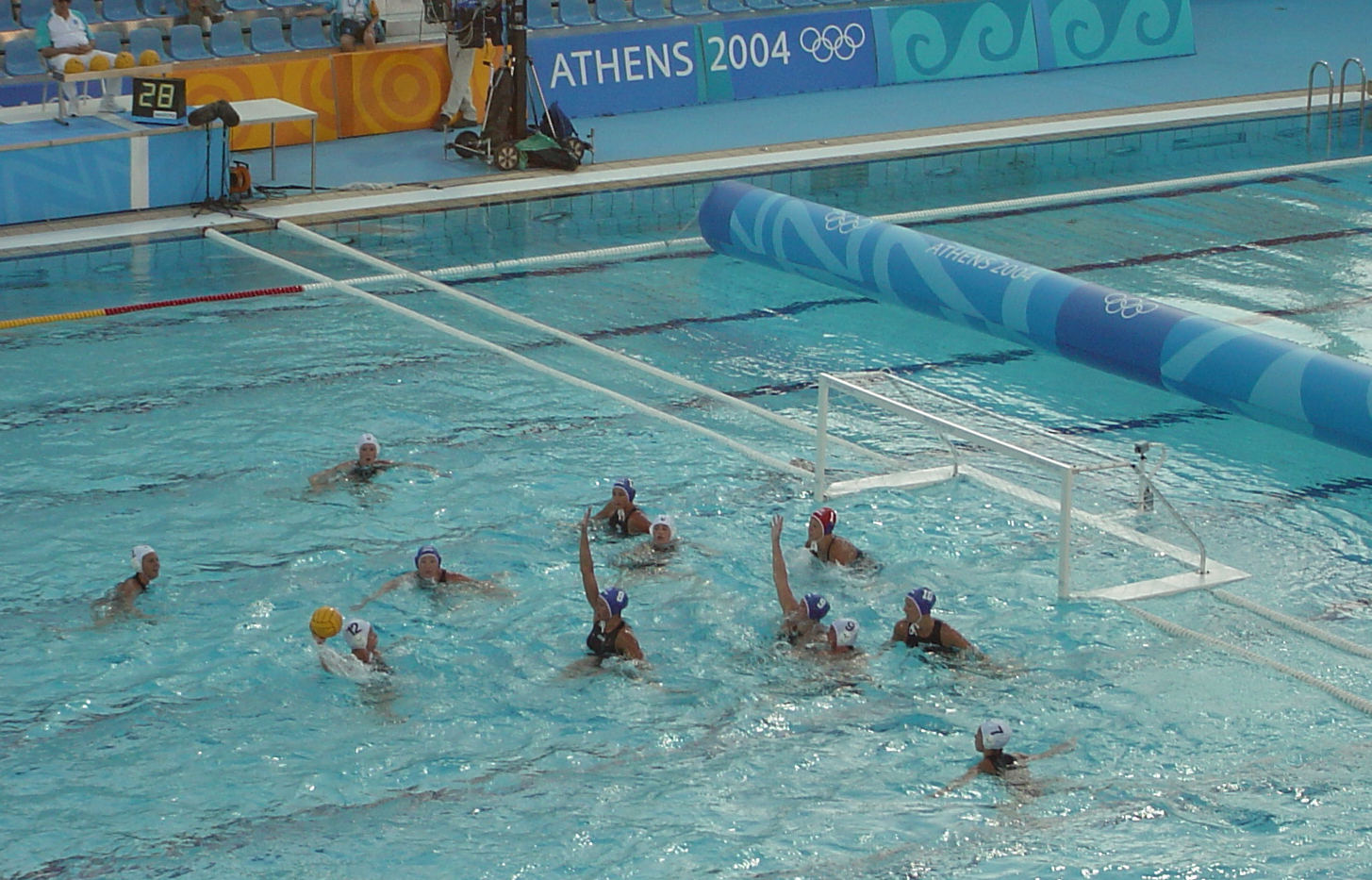
2004 Munich Olympics games

=== National teams ===
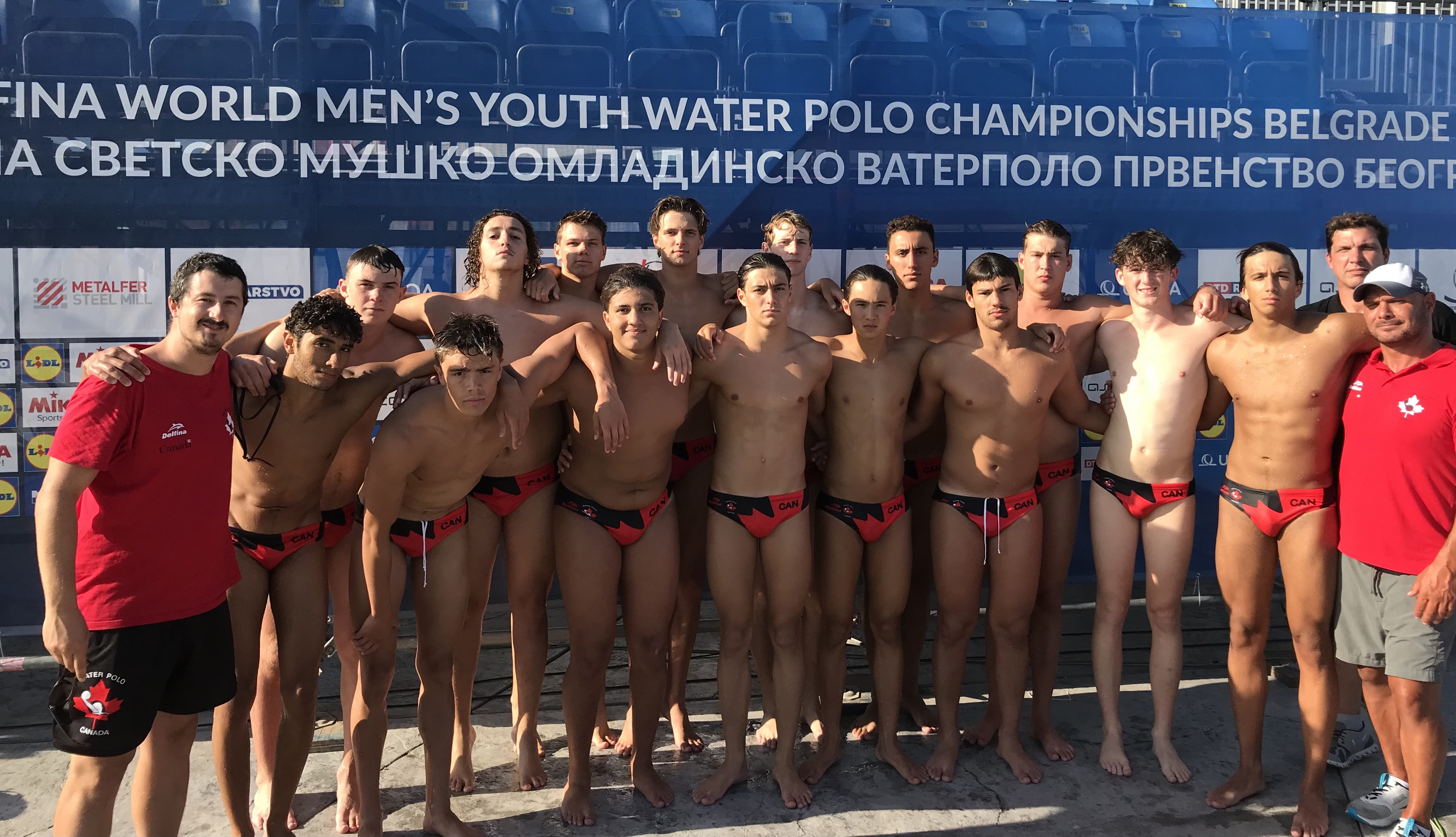
2022 junior national water polo team of Canada

Canada fielded its first national team in 1963. This squad, coached by Jeno Ats, participated in the 1963 Pan American Games. After Brazil dropped out, Canada was afforded a place in the 1972 Summer Olympics in Munich. Coached again by Ats, Canada placed 16th. As host, Canada participated in the 1976 Summer Olympics in Montreal. Led by Dezső Lemhényi, assisted by Ivan Somlai, it placed its best-ever 9th. Due to the iron curtain boycott, Canada got a spot in the 1984 Summer Olympics in Los Angeles. Coached by Gábor Csepregi, Canada finished 10th. In 2008, coached by Dragan Jovanović, the Canadian squad placed 11th. Canada's men's national team is based at the Olympic Pool in Montreal and is coached by Pat Oaten.

Canada has fielded a women's national team since 1978. The women's squad participated in the 2000 Summer Olympics in Sydney, the first to hold a women's water polo competition. At this tournament Canada placed fifth. The squad also participated in the 2004 Summer Olympics in Athens and placed seventh. Canada qualified for its third women's Olympic appearance and competed in Tokyo in 2021, finishing seventh. Canada's women's national team is currently based at the Olympic Pool in Montreal and is coached by David Paradelo.

Canada also fields junior and 18U national teams.

== Safe sport ==
Water Polo Canada adheres to the Universal Code of Conduct to Prevent and Address Maltreatment in Sport (UCCMS - Canadian Safe Sport Program (sirc.ca))

Providing a safe environment for all athletes and everyone involved in water polo—including coaches, officials, volunteers, staff, parents, fans, and spectators—is a top priority for Water Polo Canada. This Safe Sport section outlines the key elements required to achieve that goal.

As stated in our Code of Conduct:

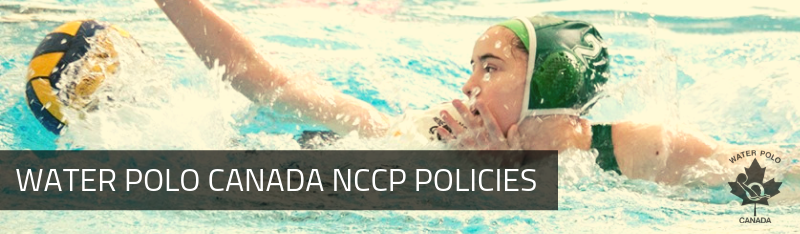
Safe sport

All Registrants are responsible for maintaining and enhancing the dignity and self-esteem of Registrants and other individuals by:

- Demonstrating respect to individuals regardless of body type, physical characteristics, athletic ability, age, ancestry, colour, race, citizenship, ethnic origin, place of origin, creed, disability, family status, marital status, socioeconomic status, gender identity, gender expression, sex, and sexual orientation
- Focusing comments or criticism appropriately and avoiding public criticism of athletes, coaches, officials, organizers, volunteers, employees, or Registrants
- Consistently demonstrating a spirit of sportsmanship, sport leadership, and ethical conduct
- Acting, when appropriate, to correct or prevent unjustly discriminatory practices
- Consistently treating individuals fairly and reasonably
- Ensuring adherence to the rules of Water Polo and the spirit of those rules

Safe Sport includes other components such as Insurance, Anti-Doping Program, and appropriate Concussion Protocol, and you will also find here the relevant information on these different elements.

== WPC NCCP Policies ==
The Water Polo Canada NCCP Operating Manual has been developed for the purpose of regulating the program standards and planning for coach development, training, and evaluation.

Water Polo Canada NCCP Operating Manual (October 2014 edition)

Water Polo Canada will allow coaches under the age of 16, but not less than 14 years of age, to access NCCP training and certification. Coaches must be at least 14 years of age as at the date of the event. The Minimum Age Policy will be in effect as of March 31, 2010.

1. Coaches at least 14 years of age, but under 16 years of age, will be identified on the NCCP Database as U16;

2. Coaches at least 14 years of age, but under 16 years of age, are only eligible to be trained and evaluated as the Competitive Coach and Community Club Coach;

3. Coaches assigned the U16 designation will have that designation automatically removed upon their 16th birthday;

4. Coaches under the age of 16 are allowed to access NCCP training.

5. Coaches under the age of 16 can access NCCP evaluation, but will not be recorded in the NCCP Locker as certified.

About the Coaching Association of Canada (CAC)

The CAC unites stakeholders and partners in its commitment to raising the skills and stature of coaches, and ultimately expanding their reach and influence. Through its programs, CAC empowers coaches with knowledge and skills, promotes ethics, fosters positive attitudes, builds competence, and increases the credibility and recognition of coaches. Visit www.coach.ca for more information about coach education and training.
