= Water polo at the 2008 Summer Olympics – Women's qualification =

The 2008 Women's Olympic Water Polo Qualifying Tournament was a tournament to decide the remaining four competing teams at the 2008 Summer Olympics in Beijing, PR China. Four teams were already qualified: Australia, China (host country), the Netherlands and the United States. The tournament was held at the new Olympic Swimming Pool (2005) in Imperia, Italy from February 17 to February 24, 2008 with twelve competing teams.

== Teams ==
GROUP A

- Brazil
- Germany
- Greece
- Italy
- Puerto Rico
- Russia

GROUP B

- Canada
- Cuba
- Czech Republic
- Hungary
- Kazakhstan
- Spain

== Preliminary round ==
=== Group A ===
	Team	Points	G	W	D	L	GF	GA	Diff
1.	Russia	9	5	4	1	0	71	31	+40
2.	Italy	9	5	4	1	0	70	32	+38
3.	Greece	6	5	3	0	2	50	50	0
4.	Germany	4	5	2	0	3	48	46	+2
5.	Puerto Rico	2	5	1	0	4	23	73	–50
6.	Brazil	0	5	0	0	5	30	60	–30

- February 17, 2008

Brazil	7 – 11	Germany
Greece	15 – 6	Puerto Rico
Italy	7 – 7	Russia

- February 18, 2008

Brazil	7 – 13	Greece
Puerto Rico	4 – 16	Italy
Germany	8 – 12	Russia

- February 19, 2008

Russia	23 – 1	Puerto Rico
Italy	19 – 5	Brazil
Greece	7 – 5	Germany

- February 20, 2008

Germany	15 – 7	Puerto Rico
Greece	7 – 15	Italy
Brazil	7 – 12	Russia

- February 21, 2008

Russia	17 – 8	Greece
Brazil	4 – 5	Puerto Rico
Italy	13 – 9	Germany

=== Group B ===
	Team	Points	G	W	D	L	GF	GA	Diff
1.	Hungary	9	5	4	1	0	68	22	+46
2.	Canada	8	5	4	0	1	49	32	+17
3.	Spain	7	5	3	1	1	71	38	+33
4.	Kazakhstan	4	5	2	0	3	48	46	+2
5.	Cuba	2	5	1	0	4	48	62	–14
6.	Czech Republic	0	5	0	0	5	26	110	–84

- February 17, 2008

Kazakhstan	9 – 13	Spain
Hungary	22 – 1	Czech Republic
Cuba	5 – 9	Canada

- February 18, 2008

Kazakhstan	14 – 11	Cuba
Spain	29 – 4	Czech Republic
Canada	5 – 11	Hungary

- February 19, 2008

Czech Republic	5 – 21	Canada
Cuba	8 – 13	Spain
Hungary	10 – 0	Kazakhstan

- February 20, 2008

Spain	7 – 8	Canada
Kazakhstan	21 – 6	Czech Republic
Cuba	7 – 16	Hungary

- February 21, 2008

Czech Republic	10 – 17	Cuba
Kazakhstan	4 – 6	Canada
Hungary	9 – 9	Spain

== Quarter finals ==
- February 22, 2008

Brazil	3 – 6	Cuba
Puerto Rico	13 – 8	Czech Republic

Italy	10 – 7	Spain
Canada	2 – 5	Greece

== Semi finals ==
- February 23, 2008

Germany	9 – 8	Cuba
Kazakhstan	13 – 5	Puerto Rico

Russia	13 – 10	Greece
Hungary	14 – 15	Italy

== Finals ==
- February 23, 2008 — 11th place

Brazil	15 – 5	Czech Republic

- February 24, 2008 — 9th place

Cuba	9 – 2	Puerto Rico

- February 24, 2008 — 7th place

Germany	12 – 13	Kazakhstan

- February 24, 2008 — 5th place

Canada	10 – 8	Spain

- February 24, 2008 — 3rd place

Hungary	11 – 10	Greece

- February 24, 2008 — 1st place

Russia	9 – 10	Italy

== Final ranking ==
RANK	TEAM
1.	Italy
2.	Russia
3.	Hungary
4.	Greece
5.	Canada
6.	Spain
7.	Kazakhstan
8.	Germany
9.	Cuba
10.	Puerto Rico
11.	Brazil
12.	Czech Republic

- Italy, Russia, Hungary and Greece qualified for the 2008 Summer Olympics in Beijing, PR China, joining Australia, PR China, Netherlands, and the United States.

== Individual awards ==
- Most Valuable Player
- Best Goalkeeper
- Best Scorer

== See also ==
- 2008 Men's Water Polo Olympic Qualifier
