= Dominique Dion =

Canadian water polo player (born 1957)

Personal information
- Born: 10 September 1957 (age 69) Quebec City, Quebec, Canada

Sport
- Sport: Water polo

Dominique Dion (born 10 September 1957) is a Canadian water polo player. He competed at the 1976 Summer Olympics and the 1984 Summer Olympics.
