= Con Kudaba =

Canadian water polo player (born 1987)

Personal information
- Born: May 17, 1987 (age 39) New Westminster, British Columbia, Canada
Medal record
Men's water polo
Representing Canada
Pan American Games
Bronze medal – third place	2007 Rio de Janeiro	Team
Silver medal – second place	2011 Guadalajara	Team
Commonwealth Championships
Silver medal – second place	2006 Perth	Team

Constantine "Con" Kudaba (born May 17, 1987, in New Westminster, British Columbia) is a male water polo player from Canada. He was a member of the Canada men's national water polo team, that claimed the bronze medal at the 2007 Pan American Games in Rio de Janeiro, Brazil.

He was a member of Canada's Olympic Squad at the 2008 Summer Olympics.

He was part of the Canadian team at the 2013 World Aquatics Championships in Barcelona, Spain, where they finished in 11th place.
