= Kevin Mitchell (water polo) =

Canadian water polo player (born 1981)

Personal information
- Born: Vancouver, British Columbia
Medal record
Men's water polo
Representing Canada
Pan American Games
Bronze medal – third place	2003 Santo Domingo	Team
Bronze medal – third place	2007 Rio de Janeiro	Team
Commonwealth Water Polo Championships
Gold medal – first place	2002 Manchester	Team

Kevin Mitchell is a male water polo player from Canada. He was a member of the Canada men's national water polo team for 8 years.

Mitchell grew up in Maple Ridge BC where he attended Laity View Elementary and Thomas Haney Secondary School. He started swimming with the Haney Neptunes Aquatic club.

International Events 2001 Fina Jr. World Championships 2002 Commonwealth Gold Medal 2003 Pan American Games Bronze Medal 2003 Fina World Championships 2004 French Open 2nd 2005 Polwelz Cup 1st 2005 FINA World Championships 13th 2006 Commonwealth Championships 2nd 2007 FINA World Championships 12th 2007 Australian National League Silver Medal 2007 French Open 1st 2008 Olympic Qualification 4th 2008 Olympic Games 11th

Mitchell's most influential coaches in his career were Stevan Buovac, John Csikos, and Dragan Jovanovic.
