= John Fox (water polo) =

Australian water polo player

Personal information
- National team: Australia
- Born: February 16, 1963 (age 63)
- Home town: Melbourne, Victoria, Australia
- Height: 191 cm (6 ft 3 in)
- Weight: 92 kg (203 lb)

Sport
- Country: Australia
- Sport: Water polo

John Fox - Australian water polo player and coach

John Dennis Fox (born 16 February 1963) is an Australian former water polo player and coach. He represented Australia at the 1988 Summer Olympics and 1992 Summer Olympics (finishing eighth and fifth respectively) and earned 383 caps for the national team. After retiring as a player from the men's national team, Fox served as head coach of the Australian men's national team from 2007 to 2012, guiding the side to the 2008 Summer Olympics and 2012 Summer Olympics and a coaching record of 103 wins from 169 matches, including bronze medals at the 2007 and 2008 FINA World League Finals. Fox is regarded as one of Australia’s finest water polo players and was inducted into the Water Polo Australia Hall of Fame in 2023.

== Early life and education ==
Fox was born on 16 February 1963 in Melbourne, Victoria. He grew up in Melbourne and later moved to Canberra. He holds a Bachelor of Applied Science (Health and Physical Education) from the Footscray Institute of Technology (now Victoria University) and a Graduate Diploma of Education from the Canberra College of Advanced Education.

He is the older brother of Joanne Fox, who won Olympic gold with the Australian women’s water polo team at the 2000 Sydney Games.

== Playing career ==
Fox made his international debut for Australia at the 1986 World Aquatics Championships in Madrid, where the team finished 10th. He went on to represent Australia at four World Championships in total: 1986 Madrid (10th), 1991 Perth (8th), 1994 Rome (10th) and 1998 Perth (4th).

He competed at the 1988 Summer Olympics in Seoul, where the Australian team finished eighth, and at the 1992 Summer Olympics in Barcelona, where the team finished fifth. Across his career he accumulated 383 caps for the Australian national team, one of the highest totals in Australian water polo history. During his playing career he stood 191 cm and weighed 92 kg.

== Coaching career ==
After retiring as an international player, Fox transitioned into coaching. He coached the Australian Student Games team in 2001 and 2005. In 2004 he joined the Australian Institute of Sport (AIS) water polo program as an assistant coach and was elevated to head coach of the AIS squad in 2005.

From 2007 to 2012 he served as head coach of the senior Australian men’s national team (the Sharks). In 169 matches he recorded 103 wins. Under his leadership the team:

- Finished 8th at the 2008 Beijing Olympics
- Finished 7th at the 2012 London Olympics (Australia’s best Olympic result in 20 years at the time)
- Won bronze medals at the 2007 and 2008 FINA World League Finals
- Competed at two World Championships, one World Cup, and three World League Finals

He has also coached numerous junior national teams, including the Australian Junior Men’s Team (2007 and 2022), the Born 2002 men’s squad, Australian Cadet Men, and various U16 and U18 programs.

In 2024 he was appointed head coach of the Fremantle Mariners in the Australian Water Polo League.

== Masters career ==
Fox continues to compete as a player. In 2024 he played with the Cowboys, who won gold in the Men’s division at the Pan Pacific Masters Games on the Gold Coast. He rejoined the team in 2026, helping them claim back-to-back gold medals at the same event.

== Honours ==
- Two-time Olympian (player: 1988, 1992)
- Two-time Olympic coach (2008, 2012)
- Bronze medals – FINA World League Finals (2007, 2008)
- Water Polo Australia Hall of Fame inductee (2023)
- Victoria University Sport Hall of Fame inductee
