= George Gross (water polo) =

Canadian water polo player (born 1952)

Personal information
- Born: 8 March 1952 (age 73); Toronto, Ontario, Canada

Sport
- Sport: Water polo

George Gross (born 8 March 1952) is a Canadian water polo player. He competed at the 1976 Summer Olympics and the 1984 Summer Olympics.
