= Rick Pugliese =

Canadian water polo player (1952–2020)

Personal information
- Born: 30 October 1952; Hamilton, Ontario, Canada
- Died: 18 August 2020 (aged 67); Hamilton, Ontario, Canada

Sport
- Sport: Water polo

Patrick Pugliese (30 October 1952 – 18 August 2020) was a Canadian water polo player. He competed at the 1972 Summer Olympics and the 1976 Summer Olympics.
