= Andrew Robinson (water polo) =

Canadian water polo player (born 1988)

Personal information
- Born: January 6, 1988 (age 38) Montreal, Quebec, Canada
Medal record
Men's water polo
Representing Canada
Pan American Games
Bronze medal – third place	2007 Rio de Janeiro	Team

Andrew Robinson (born January 6, 1988) is a male water polo player from Canada. He was a member of the Canada men's national water polo team, that claimed the bronze medal at the 2007 Pan American Games in Rio de Janeiro, Brazil.

Playing as a holechecker Robinson played in his first international competition at the 2006 Junior Pan American Championship in Montreal. He studied business at the University of Calgary. His sister Christine plays for the national women's water polo team.
