= Nick O'Halloran =

Australian water polo player

Personal information
- Born: August 14, 1987 (age 38) Perth, Western Australia, Australia

Sport
- Sport: Water polo
- Club: CN Mataro
Medal record
Representing Australia
Summer Universiade
Gold medal – first place	2009 Belgrade	Team competition

Nicholas O'Halloran (born 14 August 1987 in Perth) is an Australian water polo player. He was a member of the Australian water polo team that won the bronze medal at the 2007 FINA Water Polo World League. He is currently playing professionally for CN Mataro in the Spanish Water Polo League.

He attended Christ Church Grammar School, Perth. He studied Commerce/ Law at the University of Western Australia. Nick was presented with the UWA sports star of the year award in 2007. In 2009 he was a member of the Australian team that won the gold medal at the World Student Games, and also represented Australia at the 2009 World Aquatics Championships in Rome.
