= Nic Youngblud =

Canadian water polo player (born 1981)

Personal information
- Born: January 16, 1981 (age 45) Burlington, Ontario
Medal record
Men's water polo
Representing Canada
Pan American Games
Bronze medal – third place	2003 Santo Domingo	Team
Bronze medal – third place	2007 Rio de Janeiro	Team
Commonwealth Championships
Silver medal – second place	2006 Perth	Team

Nicolas "Nic" Youngblud (born January 16, 1981) is a male water polo player from Canada. He was a member of the Canada men's national water polo team, that claimed the bronze medal at the 2007 Pan American Games in Rio de Janeiro, Brazil.

== See also ==
- Canada men's Olympic water polo team records and statistics
- List of men's Olympic water polo tournament goalkeepers
