= Paul Pottier =

Canadian water polo player (born 1956)

Personal information
- Born: 11 April 1956 (age 69); Hamilton, Ontario, Canada

Sport
- Sport: Water polo

Paul Pottier (born 11 April 1956) is a Canadian water polo player. He competed at the 1976 Summer Olympics and the 1984 Summer Olympics.
