= Thomas Marks (water polo) =

Canadian water polo player (born 1980)

Personal information
- Born: July 2, 1980 (age 45)
Medal record
Men's water polo
Representing Canada
Pan American Games
Bronze medal – third place	2003 Santo Domingo	Team
Bronze medal – third place	2007 Rio de Janeiro	Team
Commonwealth Water Polo Championships
Gold medal – first place	2002 Manchester	Team

Thomas Marks (born July 2, 1980, in Vancouver, British Columbia) is a male water polo player from Canada. He was a member of the Canada men's national water polo team, that claimed the bronze medal at the 2007 Pan American Games in Rio de Janeiro, Brazil.

Playing as a holechecker, Marks was named MVP at 2004 National Water Polo Championship.
