= Robin Randall =

Canadian water polo player (born 1980)

Personal information
- Born: May 1, 1980 (age 46)
Medal record
Men's water polo
Representing Canada
Pan American Games
Bronze medal – third place	2007 Rio de Janeiro	Team
Silver medal – second place	2011 Guadalajara	Team
Commonwealth Championships
Gold medal – first place	2002 Manchester	Team
Silver medal – second place	2006 Perth	Team

Robin Randall (born May 1, 1980, in Regina, Saskatchewan) is a male water polo player from Canada. He was a member of the Canada men's national water polo team, that claimed the bronze medal at the 2007 Pan American Games in Rio de Janeiro, Brazil.

Randall was a member of the first Canadian team to ever qualify for an Olympic Games (Beijing, 2008) where the team finished 11th. In addition, he was the starting goaltender for the Canadian team's best-ever finish at the FINA World Championships (12th in Melbourne, 2007, and eighth in Rome, 2009).

== See also ==
- Canada men's Olympic water polo team records and statistics
- List of men's Olympic water polo tournament goalkeepers
