= Kevin Graham =

Canadian water polo player (born 1986)

- Graham in the Beijing Olympic Village in August 2008.

Personal information
- Born: April 21, 1986 (age 40) Regina, Saskatchewan, Canada

Sport
- Sport: Water polo
Medal record
Representing Canada
Commonwealth Championships
Silver medal – second place	2006 Perth	Team competition
Pan American Games
Bronze medal – third place	2007 Rio de Janeiro	Team competition
Silver medal – second place	2011 Guadalajara	Team competition

Kevin Graham (born April 21, 1986) is a Canadian water polo player. He was a member of the Canada men's national water polo team.

Graham is slated to suit up for Egri Vízilabda Klub in the Hungarian League for 2010. In 2008 and 2009 he played as a driver and hole checker for the club team PVK Jadran in Herceg Novi, Montenegro. Graham is enrolled in the Haskayne School of Business' Bachelor of Commerce program at the University of Calgary.

== See also ==
- Canada men's Olympic water polo team records and statistics
