= Nathaniel Miller =

Canadian water polo player (born 1979)

Personal information
- Born: September 21, 1979 (age 46) Montreal, Quebec
Medal record
Men's water polo
Representing Canada
Pan American Games
Bronze medal – third place	1999 Winnipeg	Team
Bronze medal – third place	2003 Santo Domingo	Team
Bronze medal – third place	2007 Rio de Janeiro	Team
Commonwealth Water Polo Championships
Gold medal – first place	2002 Manchester	Team

Nathaniel "Nath" Miller (born September 21, 1979) is a male water polo player from Canada. He won three bronze medals at the Pan American Games with the Canada men's national water polo team during his career.

Playing as a driver Miller was named MVP at the 2002 Commonwealth Water Polo Championships. He won the 2003 French Elite division championship with the Olympic Nice Club, and the 2006 Brazilian Elite division championship with Fluminense from Rio de Janeiro. Miller has a degree in history from the University of Calgary.

His past positions include a coaching position at Chelsea Piers in Stamford, Connecticut.

Former the head coach and athletic director of the Calgary Renegades Water Polo Club.
