= Dragan Jovanović (water polo) =

Serbian water polo player and coach

Sport
- Sport: Water polo
Medal record
Representing Yugoslavia
World Championship
Bronze medal – third place	1998 Perth	Team competition
European Championship
Silver medal – second place	1997 Seville	Team competition
Mediterranean Games
Gold medal – first place	1997 Bari	Team competition

Dragan Jovanović (Serbian Cyrillic: Драган Јовановић) is a Serbian water polo goalkeeper and later coach.

He coached Canada national team at the 2008 Summer Olympics.

== See also ==
- List of World Aquatics Championships medalists in water polo
