= Thomas Schertwitis =

German water polo player

Personal information
- Nationality: Germany
- Born: 2 September 1972 (age 54) Alma-Ata, Kazak ASSR, Soviet Union

Sport
- Sport: Water polo

Senior clubs
- Years: Team
- ?-?: Wasserfreunde Spandau 04
- 2004-05: Olympiacos
- 2005-: Sintez Kazan
National team
- Years: Team
- ?-?: Germany
Medal record
Representing Kazakhstan
Asian Games
Gold medal – first place	1994 Hiroshima	Team competition

Thomas Schertwitis (born 2 September 1972 in Alma-Ata, Kazak ASSR, Soviet Union) is a German water polo player who competed in the 2004 Summer Olympics and in the 2008 Summer Olympics.
