= Florian Naroska =

German water polo player

Personal information
- Born: 16 April 1982 (age 42); Mühlacker, West Germany

Sport
- Sport: Water polo

Florian Naroska (born 16 April 1982) is a German water polo player who competed in the 2008 Summer Olympics.
