= Brandon Jung =

Canadian water polo player (born 1986)

Personal information
- Born: April 28, 1986 (age 40) Surrey, British Columbia, Canada
- Spouse: Leanne Nicole James caption =
Medal record
Men's water polo
Representing Canada
Pan American Games
Bronze medal – third place	2007 Rio de Janeiro	Team

Brandon Jung (born April 28, 1986 in Surrey, British Columbia) is a male water polo player from Canada. He was a member of the Canada men's national water polo team, that claimed the bronze medal at the 2007 Pan American Games in Rio de Janeiro, Brazil.
