= Jean Sayegh =

Canadian water polo player (born 1981)

Personal information
- Born: 1981 (age 44–45)
Medal record
Men's water polo
Representing Canada
Pan American Games
| Bronze medal – third place | 2007 Rio de Janeiro | Team |
Commonwealth Championships
| Silver medal – second place | 2006 Perth | Team |

Jean Sayegh (born June 28, 1981, in Lebanon) is a male water polo player from Canada. He was a member of the Canada men's national water polo team, that claimed the bronze medal at the 2007 Pan American Games in Rio de Janeiro, Brazil. Sayegh was also part of the Canadian team which placed 11th at the 2008 Olympic Games in Beijing.

Playing as a forward Sayegh was named to the tournament all-star team at the Canadian Championships.
