= Sam McGregor =

Australian male former water polo player (born 1984)

Personal information
- Full name: Samuel McGregor
- Nationality: Australian
- Born: 12 August 1984 (age 42) Darwin, Northern Territory, Australia
- Height: 1.92 m (6 ft 4 in)
- Weight: 105 kg (231 lb)

Sport
- Sport: Water polo
- Handedness: Right
- Current club: Dubbo Water Polo Inc
- Number: 8
National team
- Years: Team
- 2002-2012: Australia

Samuel McGregor (born 12 August 1984) is an Australian male former water polo player. He was part of the Australia men's national water polo team. He competed in the 2004 Summer Olympics, the 2008 Summer Olympics and the 2012 Summer Olympics. He also competed at the 2011 World Aquatics Championships and captained the Australian team at the London games.
