= Daniel Stein (water polo) =

Canadian water polo player (born 1983)

Personal information
- Born: December 24, 1983 (age 42) North Vancouver, British Columbia
Medal record
Men's water polo
Representing Canada
Pan American Games
Bronze medal – third place	2007 Rio de Janeiro	Team

Daniel Stein (born December 24, 1983, in North Vancouver, British Columbia) is a male water polo player from Canada. He was a member of the Canada men's national water polo team, that claimed the bronze medal at the 2007 Pan American Games in Rio de Janeiro, Brazil.
