= Luigi Di Costanzo =

Italian water polo player

Personal information
- Born: 5 February 1982 (age 43); Naples, Italy

Sport
- Sport: Water polo

Luigi Di Costanzo (born 5 February 1982) is an Italian water polo player who competed in the 2008 Summer Olympics.
