= Anastasios Schizas =

Greek water polo player

Tasos Schizas
Personal information
- Nationality: Greece
- Born: 18 February 1977 (age 49)

Sport
- Sport: Water polo
- Position: Defender

Senior clubs
- Years: Team
- ?–1996: Poseidon Ilision
- 1996–2002: Ethnikos
- 2002–2014: Olympiacos
Medal record
Men's Water polo
Representing Greece
World Championships
Bronze medal – third place	2005 Montreal	Team competition
World League
Bronze medal – third place	2004 Long Beach	Team competition

Anastasios Schizas (born 18 February 1977) is a Greek retired water polo player who competed in the 2004 Summer Olympics (4th place) and the 2008 Summer Olympics (7th place). Schizas was part of the Greece men's national water polo team that won the Bronze Medal in the 2005 World Championship in Montreal and the Bronze Medal in the 2004 World League in Long Beach.

Schizas started his career at Poseidon Ilision and then played for Ethnikos Piraeus. In 2002 he signed for Olympiacos where he had a long and successful career, playing for twelve consecutive seasons (2002–2014) and winning 21 major titles (1 LEN Super Cup, 10 Greek Championships and 10 Greek Cups).

== Honours ==
=== Club ===
Olympiacos

- LEN Super Cup (1): 2002
- Greek Championship (10): 2002–03, 2003–04, 2004–05, 2006–07, 2007–08, 2008–09, 2009–10, 2010–11, 2012–13, 2013–14
- Greek Cup (10): 2002–03, 2003–04, 2005–06, 2006–07, 2007–08, 2008–09, 2009–10, 2010–11, 2012–13, 2013–14

Ethnikos

- Greek Cup (1): 1999–00

=== National team ===
- (bronze) Bronze Medal in 2005 World Championship, Montreal
- (bronze) Bronze Medal in 2004 World League, Long Beach
- 4th place in 2004 Olympic Games, Athens
- 4th place in 2003 World Championship, Barcelona

== See also ==
- List of World Aquatics Championships medalists in water polo
