= Noah Miller (water polo) =

Canadian water polo player (born 1980)

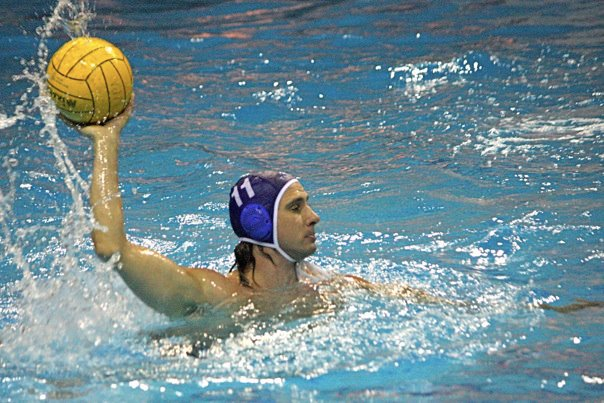

Personal information
- Born: May 5, 1980 (age 46) Regina, Saskatchewan, Canada
Medal record
Men's water polo
Representing Canada
Pan American Games
Bronze medal – third place	2003 Santo Domingo	Team
Bronze medal – third place	2007 Rio de Janeiro	Team

Noah Miller (born May 5, 1980 in Regina, Saskatchewan) is a male water polo player from Canada. He was first selected to the Canadian National Water Team as a Youth player in 1995, and continued his national team international career until his retirement in 2008. He then played and coached at the provincial and national levels with club and provincial teams in Alberta and Saskatchewan, and continues to be involved in the sport as a volunteer.

== Biography ==
Miller twice won the bronze medal, as team captain, at the Pan American Games with Canada men's national water polo team during his career.

As a player-coach, Miller has won four Open Men's Canadian National Titles with three separate clubs (Regina Squids: 2006, Hamilton Aquatic Club: 2007, Bowness Monster: 2011, 2012). He was the top scorer at, was selected to many All-Star Teams and chosen as MVP at various national and interprovincial events during his career.

Miller attended the World Aquatic Championships with Canada's National Water Polo team in Melbourne 2007, Montreal 2005, Barcelona 2003, Fukuoka 2001, the World Junior Championships in 1999 in Kuwait and in 1997 in Havana. He attended the World University FISU Games in Korea 2003, China 2001 and Palma de Mallorca 1999, as well as the Commonwealth Championships in 2002 where the team won Gold. Miller attended more than 50 international events as a member of Team Canada.

Prior to his involvement in the sport of water polo, he was a speed swimmer in Regina, Saskatchewan, with the Regina Optimist Dolphin Swim Club and Piranhas Summer Swim Club where he amassed more than 80 career Provincial and Interprovincial Championship medals and held Top 10 Canadian age group rankings in 3000 Free (1st), 1500 Free (2nd), 400 IM (4th), and top 50 Canadian rankings in 6 other events - 200 Free, 400 Free, 100 Back, 200 Back, 200 IM and 400 IM.

Miller has a degree with a major in geography and a minor in economics from the University of Calgary and a diploma in geological petroleum applications from the Southern Alberta Institute of Technology (SAIT). He resides in the community of Seton in Calgary, Alberta and currently works as a real estate agent.
