= Richie Campbell (water polo) =

Australian water polo player

Personal information
- Born: 18 September 1987 (age 38) Newcastle, New South Wales
- Height: 193 cm (6 ft 4 in)
- Weight: 92 kg (203 lb)

Sport
- Sport: Water polo
- Club: Western Suburbs Magpies, Easts
- Updated on 4 October 2015

Richie Campbell (born 18 September 1987) is an Australian water polo player who competed in the 2008, 2012 and 2016 Summer Olympics. He has played professionally in Barcelona, Spain and currently plays for the UNSW Wests Magpies in the Australian National Water-Polo League. Campbell competed at the Junior World Cup 2005 and 2007. He won a bronze medal in the World League super finals in 2007.

Campbell was picked in the water polo Sharks squad to compete in the men's water polo tournament at the 2020 Summer Olympics. The team finished joint fourth on points in their pool but their inferior goal average meant they finished fifth overall and out of medal contention. They were able to upset Croatia in a group stage match 11–8.
