= Water polo at the 2008 Summer Olympics – Men's qualification =

The 2008 Men's Olympic Water Polo Qualifying Tournament was a tournament to decide the remaining four competing teams, out of twelve, to attend the 2008 Summer Olympics in Beijing, PR China. Eight teams were already qualified, including China as the host country. The tournament was held at the "Ioan Alexandrescu" Pool, newly built in Oradea, Romania from March 2 to March 9, 2008s.

== Teams ==
GROUP A

- Brazil
- Greece
- Kazakhstan
- Romania
- Russia
- Slovakia

GROUP B

- Canada
- Germany
- Iran
- Italy
- North Macedonia
- Mexico

== Preliminary round ==
=== GROUP A ===
	Team	Points	G	W	D	L	GF	GA	Diff
1.	Greece	10	5	5	0	0	60	36	+24
2.	Romania	8	5	4	0	1	57	28	+29
3.	Russia	6	5	3	0	2	56	29	+27
4.	Slovakia	4	5	2	0	3	48	41	+7
5.	Brazil	2	5	1	0	4	28	57	–29
6.	Kazakhstan	0	5	0	0	5	25	83	–58

- Sunday March 2, 2008

Brazil	6 – 15	Greece
Russia	19 – 4	Kazakhstan
Romania	7 – 6	Slovakia

- Monday March 3, 2008

Kazakhstan	6 – 9	Brazil
Romania	11 – 8	Russia
Slovakia	9 – 11	Greece

- Tuesday March 4, 2008

Kazakhstan	8 – 18	Greece
Brazil	4 – 13	Romania
Slovakia	3 – 12	Russia

- Wednesday March 5, 2008

Slovakia	18 – 5	Kazakhstan
Russia	11 – 3	Brazil
Romania	7 – 8	Greece

- Thursday March 6, 2008

Brazil	6 – 12	Slovakia
Greece	8 – 6	Russia
Romania	19 – 2	Kazakhstan

=== GROUP B ===
	Team	Points	G	W	D	L	GF	GA	Diff
1.	Germany	9	5	4	1	0	72	18	+54
2.	Italy	8	5	3	2	0	71	23	+48
3.	Canada	7	5	3	1	1	58	36	+22
4.	North Macedonia	4	5	2	0	3	45	50	–5
5.	Iran	1	5	0	1	4	23	72	–49
6.	Mexico	1	5	0	1	4	28	98	–70

- Sunday March 2, 2008

Mexico	9 – 18	North Macedonia
Iran	2 – 20	Italy
Germany	11 – 6	Canada

- Monday March 3, 2008

Italy	14 – 5	North Macedonia
Canada	15 – 5	Iran
Mexico	1 – 29	Germany

- Tuesday March 4, 2008

Italy	7 – 7	Canada
Germany	9 – 4	North Macedonia
Mexico	8 – 8	Iran

- Wednesday March 5, 2008

North Macedonia	7 – 12	Canada
Mexico	4 – 25	Italy
Germany	18 – 2	Iran

- Thursday March 6, 2008

Italy	5 – 5	Germany
Mexico	6 – 18	Canada
Iran	6 – 11	North Macedonia

== Quarter finals ==
- Friday March 7, 2008

Kazakhstan	4 – 6	Iran
Brazil	8 – 7	Mexico

- Friday March 7, 2008

Russia	10 – 11	Italy
Romania	8 – 9	Canada

== Semi finals ==
- Saturday March 8, 2008 — 7th/10th place

Slovakia	18 – 4	Iran
North Macedonia	10 – 8	Brazil

- Saturday March 8, 2008 — 1st/4th place

Greece	8 – 9	Italy
Germany	8 – 6	Canada

== Finals ==
- Saturday March 8, 2008 — Eleventh place

Kazakhstan	9 – 11	Mexico

- Sunday March 9, 2008 — Ninth place

Iran	1 – 10	Brazil

- Sunday March 9, 2008 — Seventh place

Slovakia	9 – 7	North Macedonia

- Sunday March 9, 2008 — Fifth place

Russia	9 – 10	Romania

- Sunday March 9, 2008 — Third place

Greece	13 – 4	Canada

- Sunday March 9, 2008 — First place

Italy	9 – 10	Germany

== Final ranking ==
Rank	Team
1.	Germany
2.	Italy
3.	Greece
4.	Canada
5.	Romania
6.	Russia
7.	Slovakia
8.	North Macedonia
9.	Brazil
10.	Iran
11.	Mexico
12.	Kazakhstan

- Germany, Italy, Greece and Canada qualified for the 2008 Summer Olympics in Beijing, PR China, joining Australia, China, Croatia, Hungary, Montenegro, Serbia, Spain, and the United States.

== Individual awards ==
- Most Valuable Player
- Best Goalkeeper
  - Stefano Tempesti (ITA) — 83 saves
- Best Scorer
  - Heiko Nossek (GER) — 22 goals

== See also ==
- 2008 Women's Water Polo Olympic Qualifier
