= Justin Boyd (water polo) =

Canadian water polo player (born 1989)

Personal information
- Nicknames: Boydo, Birdo, The Wiz
- Born: 23 April 1989 (age 37) Beaconsfield, Quebec, Canada
- Height: 183 cm (6 ft 0 in)
- Weight: 92 kg (203 lb)

Sport
- Country: Canada
- Sport: water polo
Medal record
Representing Canada
Pan American Games
| Silver medal – second place | 2011 Guadalajara | Team competition |
| Bronze medal – third place | 2015 Toronto | Team competition |
- Updated on 19 August 2015

Justin Boyd (born 23 April 1989) is a water polo player of Canada, living in Beaconsfield, Quebec.

== Career ==
Boyd started playing water polo when he was twelve years old. At the 2008 Summer Olympics he was the youngest member of the Canadian water polo team. Boyd has since been a part of three FINA World Championship teams (2009, 2011, 2013), with the best result coming in Rome in 2009 when the men finished eighth. He was also part of the silver medal-winning squad at the 2011 Pan Am Games in Guadalajara. In 2014 he helped Canada match its best ever result of sixth place in the FINA Water Polo World League Super Final. Boyd began his career with the Dollard des Ormeaux water polo club in Montreal before moving to Calgary to join the senior national team. He has played professionally in Montenegro and Italy. He was part of the Canadian team at the 2015 World Aquatics Championships.

== Notable results ==
- Pan American Games: (silver) 2011, Bronze 2015
- Olympic Games: 11th 2008
- FINA World League: 6th 2014; 7th 2011
- FINA world championships: 11th 2013; 10th 2011; 8th 2009

== See also ==
- Canada at the 2015 World Aquatics Championships
