= Marko Savić (water polo) =

German water polo player

Personal information
- Born: 11 January 1981 (age 44); Belgrade, Yugoslavia

Sport
- Sport: Water polo

Marko Savić (born 11 January 1981) is a German water polo player who competed in the 2008 Summer Olympics.
