= James Stanton (water polo) =

Australian water polo player (born 1983)

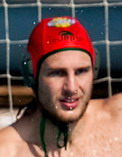

Personal information
- Full name: James Ivor Stanton-French
- Nationality: Australian
- Born: 21 July 1983 (age 42) Mudgee, New South Wales, Australia

Sport
- Sport: Water polo

James Ivor Stanton-French (born 21 July 1983 in Mudgee) is an Australian water polo player. A goalkeeper, Stanton was part of Australia's Olympic squad for the 2004 Summer Olympics in Athens and 2008 Summer Olympics in Beijing. He was also a member of the Australian squad that finished 10th at the 2007 World Championships in Melbourne and won the bronze medal at the 2007 FINA Water Polo World League in Berlin. He played in Pamplona, Spain, for two years before returning to Australia. He was given a two-year sanction (23 October 2010 – 22 September 2012) by the Australian Sports Anti-Doping Authority for clenbuterol presence. In 2013 he returned to competition and led the Victorian Tigers National Water Polo League team to an undefeated season. In the finals he was awarded the MVP of the Finals Series. He was subsequently selected in the Australian National Squad but did not play internationally as he was married in Bali to his wife Sarah.

In 2014 he played in the FINA World Cup team in Almaty, Kazakhstan. In 2015 James played in the FINA World Championships held in Kazan, Russia where he was the starting goalkeeper. Finally, in 2016 James represented Australia at his third Olympics in Rio de Janeiro.

== See also ==
- Australia men's Olympic water polo team records and statistics
- List of men's Olympic water polo tournament goalkeepers
