= Aaron Feltham (water polo) =

Canadian water polo player (born 1982)

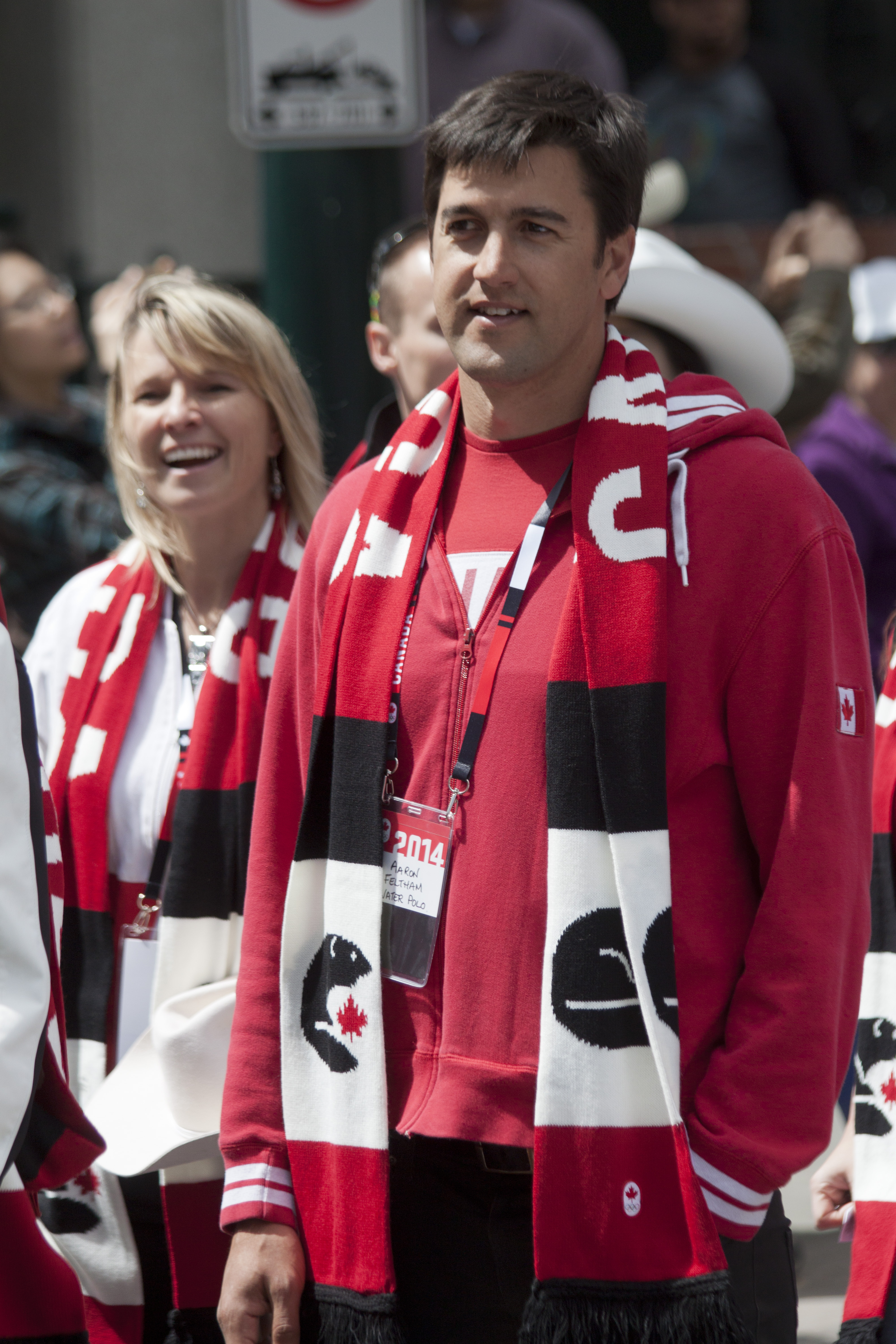
- Feltham at the Parade of Champions in Calgary (2014)

Personal information
- Nationality: Canadian
- Born: April 16, 1982 (age 44) Goderich, Ontario

Sport
- Country: Canada
- Sport: Water polo
Medal record
Men's water polo
Representing Canada
Pan American Games
| Bronze medal – third place | 2007 Rio de Janeiro | Team |
| Silver medal – second place | 2011 Guadalajara | Team |

Aaron Feltham (born April 16, 1982, in Goderich, Ontario) is a Canadian water polo player.

Feltham's professional career began at the age of 16, when he left home to play for the Ottawa Titans. Feltham played two years apiece with the Canada B water polo team and the junior national team. In 2007-08, he played in the top men's division in Hungary with Brendon ZF UPC Eger. In 2008, he was part of the Canada men's national water polo team, which took 11th out of 12 positions at the 2008 Summer Olympics. Most recently, Feltham plays professionally as a driver and hole checker for the club team Egri Vízilabda Klub in Eger, Hungary.
