= Robert Maitland (water polo) =

Australian water polo player (born 1983)

Personal information
- Born: 4 September 1983 (age 42) Brisbane, Australia

Sport
- Sport: Water polo
Medal record
Representing Australia
Summer Universiade
Gold medal – first place	2009 Belgrade	Team competition
Bronze medal – third place	2003 Daegu	Team competition

Robert Maitland (born 4 September 1983) is an Australian water polo player who competed in the 2008 Summer Olympics.
