= Anthony Martin (water polo) =

Australian water polo player (born 1985)

Personal information
- Born: 22 March 1985 (age 41) Brisbane, Australia

Sport
- Sport: Water polo
Medal record
Representing Australia
Summer Universiade
Gold medal – first place	2009 Belgrade	Team competition

Anthony Martin (born 22 March 1985) is an Australian water polo player who competed in the 2008 Summer Olympics.
