= Trent Franklin =

Australian water polo player

Personal information
- Born: 12 February 1979 (age 47) Sydney, Australia

Sport
- Sport: Water polo
Medal record
Representing Australia
Summer Universiade
Bronze medal – third place	2003 Daegu	Team competition

Trent Franklin (born 12 February 1979) is an Australian water polo player who competed in the 2004 Summer Olympics and in the 2008 Summer Olympics.
