= Commonwealth Water Polo Championships =

The Commonwealth Water Polo Championships are held in conjunction with the Commonwealth Games, although they are no longer included in the Commonwealth Games programme. They are in a round robin format.

== Water polo and the Commonwealth Games ==
Although recognised as a Commonwealth Games Federation (CGF) sport, water polo has only featured in the Games once at the 1950 British Empire Games in Auckland, New Zealand. Only Australia and New Zealand took part, where Australia won all three matches: 11-4, 13-2, 5-2. Water polo is acknowledged by the CGF as a sport for potential inclusion in future Games with further development in Commonwealth countries.

== Manchester 2002 ==
The first Commonwealth Water Polo Championships were held in March 2002 at Manchester Aquatics Centre in Manchester, England. Five teams entered in the women's championships, and nine in the men's. The championships were held prior to the July/August 2002 Commonwealth Games in Manchester.

Commonwealth Water Polo Championships Placings - Women:

1. Australia
2. Canada
3. England
4. Northern Ireland
5. South Africa

Commonwealth Water Polo Championships Placings - Men:

1. Canada
2. Australia
3. England
4. Malta
5. New Zealand
6. Singapore
7. South Africa
8. Northern Ireland
9. Wales

== Perth 2006 ==
The second Commonwealth Water Polo Championships were held in January 2006 at Challenge Stadium in Perth, Australia. The championships were held two months prior to the 2006 Commonwealth Games in Melbourne.

Commonwealth Water Polo Championships Placings - Women:

1. Australia
2. Canada
3. New Zealand
4. England
5. South Africa
6. Scotland
7. Singapore

Commonwealth Water Polo Championships Placings - Men:

1. Australia
2. Canada
3. New Zealand
4. South Africa
5. England
6. Wales
7. Singapore

== Aberdeen 2014 ==
The third Commonwealth Championships took place from April 5–12, 2014 after an 8-year gap, where no competition was held in conjunction with the 2010 Commonwealth Games in Delhi, India. The location was Aberdeen, Scotland at the newly built Aberdeen Aquatics Centre. The Championships were held prior to the 2014 Commonwealth Games in Glasgow.

Seven teams competed in the men's competition, and six in the women's.

Commonwealth Water Polo Placings - Women:

1. England
2. Canada
3. South Africa
4. Scotland
5. Wales

Commonwealth Water Polo Placings - Men:

1. England
2. Malta
3. Scotland
4. South Africa
5. New Zealand
6. Wales
7. Singapore

== Malta 2018 ==
Malta were due to host the 2018 Championships from 23–30 September, but in June 2018 decided they were unable to host, leaving too short a time to plan an alternative. The 2018 Championships therefore did not take place.

== All-time medal table ==
Rank	Nation	Gold	Silver	Bronze	Total
1	Australia	3	1	0	4
2	England	2	0	2	4
3	Canada	1	4	0	5
4	Malta	0	1	0	1
5	New Zealand	0	0	2	2
6	Scotland	0	0	1	1
6	South Africa	0	0	1	1
Totals (7 entries)		6	6	6	18
