= Water polo at the 2009 World Aquatics Championships – Men's team rosters =

These are the rosters of all participating teams at the Men's water polo tournament at the 2009 World Aquatics Championships held between July 19–31 in Rome, Italy.

== United States ==
No.	Name	Date of birth	L/R	Position	Height	Weight
1	Merrill Moses	13 August 1977	R	GK		
2	Peter Varellas	2 October 1984	L	D		
3	Brian Alexander	5 March 1983	R	CB		
4	Jeffrey Powers	21 January 1980	R	D		
5	Adam Wright	4 May 1977	R	D		
6	Justin Johnson	12 September 1985	R	CB		
7	Layne Beaubien	4 July 1976	R	D		
8	Anthony Azevedo	21 November 1981	R	D		
9	Ryan Bailey	28 August 1975	R	CF		
10	Timothy Hutten	4 June 1985	R	CB		
11	Jesse Smith	27 April 1983	R	CB		
12	James Krumpholz	22 September 1987	R	CF		
13	Genai Kerr	25 December 1976	R	GK		

== Spain ==
No.	Name	Date of birth	L/R	Position	Height	Weight
1	Iñaki Aguilar	9 September 1983	R	GK	1.89 m (6 ft 2 in)	
2	Mario Garcia	15 July 1983	R	CB		
3	David Martin	2 January 1977	R	D		
4	Blai Mallarach	21 August 1987	L	D		
5	Guillermo Molina	16 March 1984	R	D		
6	Marc Minguell	14 January 1985	R	CB		
7	Ivan Gallego	13 February 1984	R	CB		
8	Albert Espanol	29 October 1985	R	D		
9	Xavier Valles	4 September 1979	R	CF		
10	Felipe Perrone	27 February 1986	R	D		
11	Ivan Perez	29 June 1971	L	CF		
12	Xavier Garcia	5 January 1984	L	D		
13	Daniel Lopez	16 April 1980	R	GK		

== South Africa ==
No.	Name	Date of birth	L/R	Position	Height	Weight
1	Dwayne Flatscher	9 July 1984	R	GK		
2	Etienne Le Roux	18 December 1987	R	CF		
3	Andrew Ridley	8 May 1986	R	D		
4	Kevin O'Brien	23 November 1982	L	D		
5	Wesley Bohata	3 December 1992	R	D		
6	Jason Kyte	25 January 1985	R	CB		
7	Christopher Brown	23 July 1987	R	CB	1.90 m (6 ft 3 in)	
8	Ryan Bell	30 January 1982	R	CF		
9	Rick Diesel	17 December 1982	R	D		
10	Pierre Le Roux	12 December 1985	R	D		
11	Adam Kajee	28 February 1987	R	D		
12	Duncan Woods	4 March 1978	R	CB	1.83 m (6 ft 0 in)	
13	Donn Stewart	22 August 1980	R	CB		

== Serbia ==
No.	Name	Date of birth	L/R	Position	Height	Weight
1	Slobodan Soro	23 December 1978	R	GK	1.98 m (6 ft 6 in)	
2	Marko Avramovic	24 August 1986	R	D	1.88 m (6 ft 2 in)	
3	Zivko Gocic	22 August 1982	R	D	1.95 m (6 ft 5 in)	
4	Vanja Udovicic	12 September 1982	R	CB	1.97 m (6 ft 6 in)	
5	Slavko Gak	9 June 1980	R	D	1.93 m (6 ft 4 in)	
6	Dusko Pijetlovic	25 April 1985	R	CF	1.94 m (6 ft 4 in)	
7	Slobodan Nikic	25 January 1985	R	CF	1.95 m (6 ft 5 in)	
8	Milan Aleksic	13 May 1986	R	CB	1.93 m (6 ft 4 in)	
9	Nikola Radjen	29 January 1985	R	CB	1.95 m (6 ft 5 in)	
10	Filip Filipovic	2 May 1987	L	D	1.95 m (6 ft 5 in)	
11	Andrija Prlainovic	28 April 1987	R	D	1.90 m (6 ft 3 in)	
12	Stefan Mitrovic	29 March 1988	R	D	1.90 m (6 ft 3 in)	
13	Gojko Pijetlovic	7 August 1983	R	GK	1.92 m (6 ft 4 in)	

== Romania ==
No.	Name	Date of birth	L/R	Position	Height	Weight
1	Eduard Mihai Dragusin	5 January 1984	R	GK	1.88 m (6 ft 2 in)	
2	Cosmin Alexandru Radu	9 November 1981	L	CF	1.93 m (6 ft 4 in)	
3	Tiberiu Negrean	1 September 1988	R	D	1.86 m (6 ft 1 in)	
4	Nicolae Virgil Diaconu	4 September 1980	R	D	1.79 m (5 ft 10 in)	
5	Andrei Ionut Iosep	20 September 1977	L	D	1.95 m (6 ft 5 in)	
6	Dan Andrei Busila	10 November 1980	R	CB	2.02 m (6 ft 8 in)	
7	Gheorghe Florin Dunca	30 March 1979	R	CB	1.90 m (6 ft 3 in)	
8	Alexandru Matei Guiman	31 December 1980	R	D	1.94 m (6 ft 4 in)	
9	Edward Andrei Dina	19 May 1975	R	D	1.80 m (5 ft 11 in)	
10	Ramiro Georgescu	27 November 1982	R	D	1.90 m (6 ft 3 in)	
11	Alexandru Ghiban	12 October 1986	R	CF	1.95 m (6 ft 5 in)	
12	Kalman Kadar	11 June 1979	R	CB	1.90 m (6 ft 3 in)	
13	Dragos Stoenescu	30 May 1979	R		1.97 m (6 ft 6 in)	

== Montenegro ==
No.	Name	Date of birth	L/R	Position	Height	Weight
1	Zdravko Radic	24 June 1979	R	GK	1.93 m (6 ft 4 in)	
2	Drasko Brguljan	27 December 1984	R	W	1.93 m (6 ft 4 in)	
3	Vjekoslav Paskovic	23 March 1985	R	W	1.81 m (5 ft 11 in)	
4	Nikola Vukcevic	14 November 1985	R	CF	1.96 m (6 ft 5 in)	
5	Aleksandar Radovic	24 February 1987	R	D	1.91 m (6 ft 3 in)	
6	Milan Ticic	14 August 1979	R	CB	1.97 m (6 ft 6 in)	
7	Mladjan Janovic	11 June 1984	R	P	1.90 m (6 ft 3 in)	
8	Nikola Janovic	22 March 1980	R	P	1.91 m (6 ft 3 in)	
9	Aleksandar Ivovic	24 February 1986	R	CB	1.97 m (6 ft 6 in)	
10	Boris Zlokovic	16 March 1983	R	CF	1.97 m (6 ft 6 in)	
11	Vladimir Gojkovic	29 January 1981	R	P	1.88 m (6 ft 2 in)	
12	Predrag Jokic	3 February 1983	R	CB	1.88 m (6 ft 2 in)	
13	Milos Scepanovic	9 October 1982	R	GK	1.85 m (6 ft 1 in)	

== North Macedonia ==
No.	Name	Date of birth	L/R	Position	Height	Weight
1	Dalibor Percinic	5 May 1976	R	GK		
2	Anastas Beley		R	CB		
3	Ivan Vuksanovic	26 September 1981	R	D		
4	Dimitar Dimovski		R	CB		
5	Nebojsa Milic	9 August 1972	R	CB		
6	Dimitar Stojcev		R	D		
7	Marko Micic	21 July 1981	R	CB		
8	Vladimir Kreckovic		R	D		
9	Dusan Krstic	11 June 1979	L	D		
10	Marko Basic	17 August 1979	R	CF		
11	Nenad Petrovic	3 May 1977	R	CB		
12	Danijel Benic	22 April 1977	R	CF		
13	Milos Urosevic	8 March 1980	R	GK		

== Kazakhstan ==
No.	Name	Date of birth	L/R	Position	Height	Weight
1	Alexandr Anissimov	30 August 1987		GK		
2	Alexey Shmider	19 March 1990		FP		
3	Alexandr Gaidukov	10 January 1973		FP		
4	Sergey Gorovoy	6 August 1975		FP		
5	Murat Shakenov	23 September 1990		FP		
6	Vladislav Andreyev	20 December 1982		FP		
7	Roman Pinipenko	24 December 1987		FP		
8	Nikita Kokorin	22 July 1989		FP		
9	Rustam Ukumanov	22 March 1986		FP		
10	Mikhail Ruday	4 May 1988		FP		
11	Ravil Manafov	22 June 1985		FP		
12	Adil Temrkhanov	3 September 1985		FP		
13	Alexey Demtchenko	5 December 1987		GK		

== Italy ==
No.	Name	Date of birth	L/R	Position	Height	Weight
1	Stefano Tempesti	9 June 1979	R	GK	2.05 m (6 ft 9 in)	
2	Federico Mistrangelo	11 May 1981	R	D		
3	Alex Giorgetti	24 December 1987	R	D		
4	Fabrizio Buonocore	28 April 1977	R	CB		
5	Valentino Gallo	17 July 1985	L	D		
6	Maurizio Felugo		R	D		
7	Andrea Mangiante	1 July 1976	R	CB		
8	Valerio Rizzo	21 September 1984	R	D		
9	Niccolo Figari	24 January 1988	R	CB		
10	Alessandro Calcaterra		R	CF		
11	Matteo Aicardi	19 March 1986	R	CF		
12	Goran Fiorentini	21 November 1981	R	D		
13	Tommaso Negri	26 May 1986	R	GK		

== Hungary ==
No.	Name	Date of birth	L/R	Position	Height	Weight
1	István Gergely	20 August 1976	R	GK		
2	Márton Szivós	19 August 1981	R	FP		
3	Norbert Madaras	1 December 1979	L	FP		
4	Dénes Varga	29 March 1987	R	FP		
5	Miklós Gór-Nagy	8 January 1983	R	FP		
6	Norbert Hosnyánszky	4 March 1984	R	FP		
7	Gergely Kiss	21 September 1977	L	FP		
8	Zsolt Varga	24 May 1978	R	FP		
9	Dániel Varga	25 September 1983	R	FP		
10	Péter Biros	5 April 1976	R	FP		
11	Gábor Kis	27 September 1982	R	FP		
12	Balázs Hárai	5 April 1987	R	FP		
13	Viktor Nagy	24 July 1984	R	GK	1.98 m (6 ft 6 in)	

== Germany ==
No.	Name	Date of birth	L/R	Position	Height	Weight
1	Alexander Tchigir	6 November 1968	R	GK		
2	Florian Naroska	16 April 1982	R	FP		
3	Fabian Schroedter	11 September 1982	R	FP		
4	Marko Savic	11 January 1981	R	FP		
5	Marko Stamm	30 August 1988	R	FP		
6	Marc Politze	20 October 1977	R	FP		
7	Heiko Nossek	14 March 1982	R	FP		
8	Julian Real	22 December 1989	R	FP		
9	Tobias Preuss	3 August 1988	R	FP		
10	Moritz Oeler	21 October 1985	R	FP		
11	Andreas Schlotterbeck	2 March 1982	R	FP		
12	Soeren Mackeben	29 January 1979	R	FP		
13	Roger Kong	22 September 1984	R	GK		

== Croatia ==
No.	Name	Date of birth	L/R	Position	Height	Weight
1	Ivo Brzica	13 August 1980	R	GK	1.96 m (6 ft 5 in)	
2	Damir Buric	2 December 1980	R	CB	2.05 m (6 ft 9 in)	
3	Miho Boskovic	11 January 1983	R	D	1.96 m (6 ft 5 in)	
4	Niksa Dobud	5 August 1985	R	CF	1.99 m (6 ft 6 in)	
5	Ivan Buljubasic	31 October 1987	R	D	1.99 m (6 ft 6 in)	
6	Srdan Antonijevic	3 February 1985	R	D	1.93 m (6 ft 4 in)	
7	Frano Karac	4 June 1977	R	D	1.92 m (6 ft 4 in)	
8	Andro Buslje	4 January 1986	R	CB	1.99 m (6 ft 6 in)	
9	Sandro Sukno	30 June 1990	R	D	1.98 m (6 ft 6 in)	
10	Samir Barac	2 November 1973	R	D	1.88 m (6 ft 2 in)	
11	Igor Hinic	4 December 1975	R	CF	2.02 m (6 ft 8 in)	
12	Paulo Obradovic	9 March 1986	R	D	1.90 m (6 ft 3 in)	
13	Josip Pavic	5 January 1982	R	GK	1.96 m (6 ft 5 in)	

== China ==
No.	Name	Date of birth	L/R	Position	Height	Weight
1	Ge Weiqing	25 April 1977	R	GK		
2	Liang Zhongxing	23 December 1986	R	CB		
3	Li Jun	18 October 1980	R	CB		
4	Yu Lijun	28 November 1978	R	CF		
5	Tan Feihu	11 January 1987	R	CF		
6	Wang Beiming	13 August 1983	R	D		
7	Li Bin	24 October 1983	R	D		
8	Wang Yong	29 January 1979	R	D		
9	Wang Yang	17 January 1983	R	D		
10	Xie Junmin	17 May 1983	R	D		
11	Han Zhidong	29 July 1977	R	D		
12	Guo Junliang	1 December 1984	R	CB		
13	Wu Honghui	10 April 1990	R	GK		

== Canada ==
No.	Name	Date of birth	L/R	Position	Height	Weight
1	Robin Randall	1 May 1980	R	GK		
2	Constantin Kudaba	17 May 1987	R	CF		
3	Jonathan Ruse	12 January 1987	R	D		
4	Nicolas Constantin-Bicari	5 December 1991	R	CF		
5	Justin Boyd	23 April 1989	R	D		
6	Thomas Marks		R	CB		
7	Brandon Jung		R	D		
8	Kevin Graham		L	D		
9	Aaron Feltham		R	D		
10	Dusko Dakic		R	D		
11	Devon Diggle		R	D		
12	Jared Mcelroy		R	CF		
13	Nicolas Youngblud		R	GK		

== Brazil ==
No.	Name	Date of birth	L/R	Position	Height	Weight
1	Andre Cordeiro	9 August 1967	R	GK	1.88 m (6 ft 2 in)	
2	Conrado Bertoluzzi	13 July 1981	R	CB		
3	Marco Santos	15 July 1985	R	CF	1.96 m (6 ft 5 in)	
4	Lucas Vita	1 March 1985	L	D	1.97 m (6 ft 6 in)	
5	Marcelo Franco	15 May 1984	L	D	1.82 m (6 ft 0 in)	
6	Leandro Machado	27 February 1977	R	CB	1.92 m (6 ft 4 in)	
7	Felipe Silva	8 August 1984	R	CB	1.96 m (6 ft 5 in)	
8	Ruda Franco	25 July 1986	R	D	1.84 m (6 ft 0 in)	
9	Erik Seegerer	21 January 1976	R	D	1.83 m (6 ft 0 in)	
10	Felipe Franco	17 May 1982	R	CB	1.90 m (6 ft 3 in)	
11	Daniel Mameri	4 April 1972	R	D	1.88 m (6 ft 2 in)	
12	Danilo Correa	2 September 1988	R	CF	1.93 m (6 ft 4 in)	
13	Luis Mauricio Santos	7 August 1980	R	GK	1.94 m (6 ft 4 in)	

== Australia ==
No.	Name	Date of birth	L/R	Position	Height	Weight
1	James Stanton	21 July 1987	B	GK	2.00 m (6 ft 7 in)	
2	Richard Campbell	18 September 1987	R	CB	1.93 m (6 ft 4 in)	
3	Timothy Cleland	15 December 1984	R	CF	1.95 m (6 ft 5 in)	
4	Nicholas O'Halloran	14 August 1987	L	D	1.88 m (6 ft 2 in)	
5	Robert Maitland	4 September 1983	R	CB	1.90 m (6 ft 3 in)	
6	Anthony Martin	20 March 1985	R	CB	1.92 m (6 ft 4 in)	
7	John Cotterill	29 October 1987	R	D	1.93 m (6 ft 4 in)	
8	Grant Richardson	27 April 1981	R	D	1.82 m (6 ft 0 in)	
9	Thomas Whalan	13 October 1980	R	D	1.94 m (6 ft 4 in)	
10	William Miller	21 February 1988	R	D	1.84 m (6 ft 0 in)	
11	Rhys Howden	2 April 1987	R	D	1.88 m (6 ft 2 in)	
12	Sean Boyd	10 September 1978	R	CF	1.91 m (6 ft 3 in)	
13	Luke Quinlivan	20 August 1985	B	GK	1.92 m (6 ft 4 in)	

== See also ==
- Water polo at the 2009 World Aquatics Championships – Women's team rosters
