= Water polo at the 2010 Asian Games – Men's tournament =

Men at the 2010 Asian Games
- Venue: Tianhe Natatorium
- Date: 18–25 November 2010
- Competitors: 117 from 9 nations

Medalists
gold medal	Kazakhstan
silver medal	China
bronze medal	Japan

Men's water polo at the 2010 Asian Games was held in Guangzhou, Guangdong, China from 18 to 25 November 2010. In this tournament, 9 teams played.

It also served as the Asian qualification for the 2011 World Aquatics Championships.

== Squads ==
Athletes from Kuwait	China	Hong Kong	Japan
Mohammad Al-Mulla; Nawaf Al-Otaibi; Marzouq Al-Ajmi; Mohammad Mandani; Ahmad Mandani; Mohammad Ashour; Jasem Al-Rumaidheen; Jasem Al-Salem; Yousef Bosakhar; Adnan Khan; Rashid Al-Shatti; Mohammad Al-Otaibi; Talal Al-Otaibi	Ge Weiqing; Tan Feihu; Liang Zhongxing; Yu Lijun; Guo Junliang; Pan Ning; Li Bin; Wang Yang; Xie Junmin; Wang Beiming; Han Zhidong; Jiang Bin; Huang Meicai	Michael Cheung; Zhao Jinwen; Koo Yu Fat; Lee Kwan Shing; Chan Sze Ho; Toby To; Fong Ho Cheung; Ku Yat Wa; Chung Kwok Leung; Cheung Hok Him; Po Yue Kai; Kelvin Cheng; Cheng Ka Long	Katsuyuki Tanamura; Mitsuaki Shiga; Kan Irei; Koji Takei; Kan Aoyagi; Hiroki Wakamatsu; Yusuke Shimizu; Akira Yanase; Koji Kobayashi; Yoshinori Shiota; Atsushi Naganuma; Satoshi Nagata; Shota Hazui
Kazakhstan	Qatar	Saudi Arabia	Singapore
Alexandr Shvedov; Sergey Gubarev; Alexandr Gaidukov; Murat Shakenov; Alexey Panfili; Roman Pilipenko; Alexandr Axenov; Rustam Ukumanov; Yevgeniy Zhilyayev; Mikhail Ruday; Ravil Manafov; Azamat Zhulumbetov; Nikolay Maximov	Abdulaziz Al-Mutawaa; Mohammed Al-Malki; Abdulaziz Al-Hammadi; Omar Al-Malki; Saleh Al-Nabet; Abdulla Al-Shahrani; Ali Al-Lanjawi; Morshid Al-Rabaan; Abdulrahman Al-Sulaiti; Ali Abdin; Zaid Al-Abidi; Mohammed Al-Ibrahim; Salem Al-Marri	Bandar Al-Zahrani; Yasser Al-Zahrani; Mohammed Gahal; Yousef Al-Mansour; Saleh Al-Zahrani; Malik Mokhtar; Adel Al-Malki; Khaled Al-Harbi; Hamed Al-Nefaiei; Bader Al-Dughather; Hattan Al-Olayan; Yousri Al-Laili; Yasser Barnawi	Nigel Tay; Foo Chuan Yu; Ng Li Ming; Loh Zhi Zhi; Kelvin Ong; Lin Diyan; Lin Diyang; Luo Nan; Ang Song Loo; Paul Louis Tan; Teo Zhen Wei; Lim Yaoxiang; Alvin Poh
South Korea			
Maeng Sung-hoon; Park Jun-jong; Kang Jun-won; Kim Hyun-jong; Park Bong-soo; Kim Ki-woo; Yoo Byeong-jin; Gwon Yeong-gyun; Lee Min-soo; Lee Hyun-kyu; Lee Duk-jae; Song Won-ho; Song Geun-ho			

== Results ==
All times are China Standard Time (UTC+08:00)

=== Preliminary ===
==== Group A ====
Pos	Team	Pld	W	D	L	GF	GA	GD	Pts	Qualification
1	Japan	4	4	0	0	72	16	+56	8	Quarterfinals
2	China	4	3	0	1	72	16	+56	6	Quarterfinals
3	South Korea	4	2	0	2	54	33	+21	4	Quarterfinals
4	Hong Kong	4	1	0	3	33	73	−40	2	Quarterfinals
5	Qatar	4	0	0	4	5	98	−93	0	

Source: Results

18 November; 14:30	South Korea	18–5	Hong Kong	Tianhe Natatorium, Guangzhou; Referees: Tan (SIN), Al-Saad (KUW)
18 November; 14:30	Score by quarters: 4–2, 3–0, 6–2, 5–1			Tianhe Natatorium, Guangzhou; Referees: Tan (SIN), Al-Saad (KUW)
18 November; 14:30	Kang 4	Goals	Zhao 2	Tianhe Natatorium, Guangzhou; Referees: Tan (SIN), Al-Saad (KUW)

18 November; 15:55	China	9–3	Japan	Tianhe Natatorium, Guangzhou; Referees: Margeta (SLO), Bock (GER)
18 November; 15:55	Score by quarters: 4–2, 0–1, 3–0, 2–0			Tianhe Natatorium, Guangzhou; Referees: Margeta (SLO), Bock (GER)
18 November; 15:55	Liang 3	Goals	Aoyagi 3	Tianhe Natatorium, Guangzhou; Referees: Margeta (SLO), Bock (GER)

19 November; 14:30	Qatar	1–26	South Korea	Tianhe Natatorium, Guangzhou; Referees: Salnichenko (KAZ), Al-Sheaifi (KSA)
19 November; 14:30	Score by quarters: 1–5, 0–7, 0–4, 0–10			Tianhe Natatorium, Guangzhou; Referees: Salnichenko (KAZ), Al-Sheaifi (KSA)
19 November; 14:30	Abdin 1	Goals	Lee M. 6	Tianhe Natatorium, Guangzhou; Referees: Salnichenko (KAZ), Al-Sheaifi (KSA)

19 November; 15:55	Hong Kong	6–24	China	Tianhe Natatorium, Guangzhou; Referees: Tan (SIN), Al-Saad (KUW)
19 November; 15:55	Score by quarters: 1–8, 1–6, 3–5, 1–5			Tianhe Natatorium, Guangzhou; Referees: Tan (SIN), Al-Saad (KUW)
19 November; 15:55	K. Cheng 2	Goals	Jiang 5	Tianhe Natatorium, Guangzhou; Referees: Tan (SIN), Al-Saad (KUW)

20 November; 9:00	Japan	30–1	Hong Kong	Tianhe Natatorium, Guangzhou; Referees: Salnichenko (KAZ), Bock (GER)
20 November; 9:00	Score by quarters: 5–1, 10–0, 7–0, 8–0			Tianhe Natatorium, Guangzhou; Referees: Salnichenko (KAZ), Bock (GER)
20 November; 9:00	Aoyagi 5	Goals	Chung 1	Tianhe Natatorium, Guangzhou; Referees: Salnichenko (KAZ), Bock (GER)

20 November; 15:55	China	26–1	Qatar	Tianhe Natatorium, Guangzhou; Referees: Al-Sheaifi (KSA), Koganov (AZE)
20 November; 15:55	Score by quarters: 7–0, 8–1, 7–0, 4–0			Tianhe Natatorium, Guangzhou; Referees: Al-Sheaifi (KSA), Koganov (AZE)
20 November; 15:55	Xie 5	Goals	Al-Sulaiti 1	Tianhe Natatorium, Guangzhou; Referees: Al-Sheaifi (KSA), Koganov (AZE)

21 November; 14:30	Qatar	2–25	Japan	Tianhe Natatorium, Guangzhou; Referees: Stavridis (GRE), Tan (SIN)
21 November; 14:30	Score by quarters: 1–10, 0–8, 1–3, 0–4			Tianhe Natatorium, Guangzhou; Referees: Stavridis (GRE), Tan (SIN)
21 November; 14:30	Al-Lanjawi 2	Goals	Irei, Takei 5	Tianhe Natatorium, Guangzhou; Referees: Stavridis (GRE), Tan (SIN)

21 November; 15:55	South Korea	6–13	China	Tianhe Natatorium, Guangzhou; Referees: Margeta (SLO), Makihashi (JPN)
21 November; 15:55	Score by quarters: 1–3, 0–2, 2–2, 3–6			Tianhe Natatorium, Guangzhou; Referees: Margeta (SLO), Makihashi (JPN)
21 November; 15:55	Gwon, Lee D. 2	Goals	Tan 3	Tianhe Natatorium, Guangzhou; Referees: Margeta (SLO), Makihashi (JPN)

22 November; 9:00	Japan	14–4	South Korea	Tianhe Natatorium, Guangzhou; Referees: Ni (CHN), Stavridis (GRE)
22 November; 9:00	Score by quarters: 7–1, 1–1, 1–0, 5–2			Tianhe Natatorium, Guangzhou; Referees: Ni (CHN), Stavridis (GRE)
22 November; 9:00	Shimizu, Yanase 3	Goals	Park J. 2	Tianhe Natatorium, Guangzhou; Referees: Ni (CHN), Stavridis (GRE)

22 November; 14:30	Qatar	1–21	Hong Kong	Tianhe Natatorium, Guangzhou; Referees: Margeta (SLO), Bock (GER)
22 November; 14:30	Score by quarters: 1–5, 0–3, 0–7, 0–6			Tianhe Natatorium, Guangzhou; Referees: Margeta (SLO), Bock (GER)
22 November; 14:30	Al-Sulaiti 1	Goals	Zhao 6	Tianhe Natatorium, Guangzhou; Referees: Margeta (SLO), Bock (GER)

==== Group B ====
Pos	Team	Pld	W	D	L	GF	GA	GD	Pts	Qualification
1	Kazakhstan	3	3	0	0	58	9	+49	6	Quarterfinals
2	Athletes from Kuwait	3	1	1	1	18	29	−11	3 (Note: Head-to-head result: IOC 7–7 SIN. Goal difference against the highest placed team (KAZ): IOC −13, SIN −16.)	Quarterfinals
3	Singapore	3	1	1	1	23	37	−14	3	Quarterfinals
4	Saudi Arabia	3	0	0	3	20	44	−24	0	Quarterfinals

Source: Results
Notes:

18 November; 9:00	Saudi Arabia	3–23	Kazakhstan	Tianhe Natatorium, Guangzhou; Referees: Lee (KOR), Makihashi (JPN)
18 November; 9:00	Score by quarters: 0–5, 0–6, 2–5, 1–7			Tianhe Natatorium, Guangzhou; Referees: Lee (KOR), Makihashi (JPN)
18 November; 9:00	Al-Malki, Al-Dughather, Al-Olayan 1	Goals	Gubarev 5	Tianhe Natatorium, Guangzhou; Referees: Lee (KOR), Makihashi (JPN)

18 November; 10:25	Singapore	7–7	Athletes from Kuwait	Tianhe Natatorium, Guangzhou; Referees: Stavridis (GRE), Koganov (AZE)
18 November; 10:25	Score by quarters: 2–2, 2–1, 1–3, 2–1			Tianhe Natatorium, Guangzhou; Referees: Stavridis (GRE), Koganov (AZE)
18 November; 10:25	Teo 3	Goals	N. Al-Otaibi, A. Mandani, Al-Salem 2	Tianhe Natatorium, Guangzhou; Referees: Stavridis (GRE), Koganov (AZE)

20 November; 10:25	Athletes from Kuwait	1–14	Kazakhstan	Tianhe Natatorium, Guangzhou; Referees: Shi (CHN), Chung (HKG)
20 November; 10:25	Score by quarters: 0–7, 0–2, 0–3, 1–2			Tianhe Natatorium, Guangzhou; Referees: Shi (CHN), Chung (HKG)
20 November; 10:25	Khan 1	Goals	Axenov 4	Tianhe Natatorium, Guangzhou; Referees: Shi (CHN), Chung (HKG)

20 November; 14:30	Singapore	11–9	Saudi Arabia	Tianhe Natatorium, Guangzhou; Referees: Ni (CHN), Stavridis (GRE)
20 November; 14:30	Score by quarters: 2–1, 4–1, 3–4, 2–3			Tianhe Natatorium, Guangzhou; Referees: Ni (CHN), Stavridis (GRE)
20 November; 14:30	Luo, Teo 3	Goals	Al-Nefaiei, Al-Dughather 2	Tianhe Natatorium, Guangzhou; Referees: Ni (CHN), Stavridis (GRE)

22 November; 10:25	Athletes from Kuwait	10–8	Saudi Arabia	Tianhe Natatorium, Guangzhou; Referees: Koganov (AZE), Salnichenko (KAZ)
22 November; 10:25	Score by quarters: 3–2, 1–3, 2–2, 4–1			Tianhe Natatorium, Guangzhou; Referees: Koganov (AZE), Salnichenko (KAZ)
22 November; 10:25	A. Mandani 4	Goals	Al-Nefaiei 2	Tianhe Natatorium, Guangzhou; Referees: Koganov (AZE), Salnichenko (KAZ)

22 November; 15:55	Singapore	5–21	Kazakhstan	Tianhe Natatorium, Guangzhou; Referees: Chung (HKG), Lee (KOR)
22 November; 15:55	Score by quarters: 0–6, 3–4, 0–5, 2–6			Tianhe Natatorium, Guangzhou; Referees: Chung (HKG), Lee (KOR)
22 November; 15:55	five players 1	Goals	Axenov 6	Tianhe Natatorium, Guangzhou; Referees: Chung (HKG), Lee (KOR)

=== Final round ===
Quarterfinals
23 November
China	22
Saudi Arabia	2
23 November
South Korea	4
Athletes from Kuwait	3
23 November
Japan	25
Singapore	3
23 November
Hong Kong	1
Kazakhstan	25

Semifinals
24 November
China	22
South Korea	9
24 November
Japan	8
Kazakhstan	10

Gold medal match
25 November
China	6
Kazakhstan	7
Bronze medal match
25 November
South Korea	5
Japan	19

Classification 5th–8th
24 November
Saudi Arabia	7
Athletes from Kuwait	9
24 November
Singapore	14
Hong Kong	6

Classification 5th–6th
25 November
Athletes from Kuwait	5
Singapore	4
Classification 7th–8th
25 November
Saudi Arabia	20
Hong Kong	11

==== Quarterfinals ====
23 November; 14:30	Japan	25–3	Singapore	Tianhe Natatorium, Guangzhou; Referees: Shi (CHN), Chung (HKG)
23 November; 14:30	Score by quarters: 5–2, 5–1, 8–0, 7–0			Tianhe Natatorium, Guangzhou; Referees: Shi (CHN), Chung (HKG)
23 November; 14:30	Shiota 5	Goals	Loh, Lin Diyan, Lin Diyang 1	Tianhe Natatorium, Guangzhou; Referees: Shi (CHN), Chung (HKG)

23 November; 15:55	China	22–2	Saudi Arabia	Tianhe Natatorium, Guangzhou; Referees: Lee (KOR), Tan (SIN)
23 November; 15:55	Score by quarters: 6–0, 4–2, 6–0, 6–0			Tianhe Natatorium, Guangzhou; Referees: Lee (KOR), Tan (SIN)
23 November; 15:55	four players 3	Goals	Al-Dughather, Al-Laili 1	Tianhe Natatorium, Guangzhou; Referees: Lee (KOR), Tan (SIN)

23 November; 19:30	South Korea	4–3	Athletes from Kuwait	Tianhe Natatorium, Guangzhou; Referees: Salnichenko (KAZ), Stavridis (GRE)
23 November; 19:30	Score by quarters: 1–0, 3–2, 0–1, 0–0			Tianhe Natatorium, Guangzhou; Referees: Salnichenko (KAZ), Stavridis (GRE)
23 November; 19:30	four players 1	Goals	N. Al-Otaibi, A. Mandani, Khan 1	Tianhe Natatorium, Guangzhou; Referees: Salnichenko (KAZ), Stavridis (GRE)

23 November; 20:55	Hong Kong	1–25	Kazakhstan	Tianhe Natatorium, Guangzhou; Referees: Al-Saad (KUW), Al-Sheaifi (KSA)
23 November; 20:55	Score by quarters: 0–8, 0–5, 1–8, 0–4			Tianhe Natatorium, Guangzhou; Referees: Al-Saad (KUW), Al-Sheaifi (KSA)
23 November; 20:55	To 1	Goals	Ruday 6	Tianhe Natatorium, Guangzhou; Referees: Al-Saad (KUW), Al-Sheaifi (KSA)

==== Classification 5th–8th ====
24 November; 14:30	Saudi Arabia	7–9	Athletes from Kuwait	Tianhe Natatorium, Guangzhou; Referees: Margeta (SLO), Koganov (AZE)
24 November; 14:30	Score by quarters: 2–1, 1–4, 2–2, 2–2			Tianhe Natatorium, Guangzhou; Referees: Margeta (SLO), Koganov (AZE)
24 November; 14:30	Gahal 4	Goals	Ashour, Khan 2	Tianhe Natatorium, Guangzhou; Referees: Margeta (SLO), Koganov (AZE)

24 November; 15:55	Singapore	14–6	Hong Kong	Tianhe Natatorium, Guangzhou; Referees: Ni (CHN), Lee (KOR)
24 November; 15:55	Score by quarters: 3–0, 2–2, 4–2, 5–2			Tianhe Natatorium, Guangzhou; Referees: Ni (CHN), Lee (KOR)
24 November; 15:55	Teo 4	Goals	Ku 3	Tianhe Natatorium, Guangzhou; Referees: Ni (CHN), Lee (KOR)

==== Semifinals ====
24 November; 19:30	China	22–9	South Korea	Tianhe Natatorium, Guangzhou; Referees: Makihashi (JPN), Tan (SIN)
24 November; 19:30	Score by quarters: 6–1, 5–1, 8–3, 3–4			Tianhe Natatorium, Guangzhou; Referees: Makihashi (JPN), Tan (SIN)
24 November; 19:30	Tan, Pan 4	Goals	Kim H., Park B. 2	Tianhe Natatorium, Guangzhou; Referees: Makihashi (JPN), Tan (SIN)

24 November; 20:55	Japan	8–10	Kazakhstan	Tianhe Natatorium, Guangzhou; Referees: Bock (GER), Stavridis (GRE)
24 November; 20:55	Score by quarters: 2–3, 3–4, 1–0, 2–3			Tianhe Natatorium, Guangzhou; Referees: Bock (GER), Stavridis (GRE)
24 November; 20:55	Hazui 3	Goals	Gubarev 3	Tianhe Natatorium, Guangzhou; Referees: Bock (GER), Stavridis (GRE)

==== Classification 7th–8th ====
25 November; 14:30	Saudi Arabia	20–11	Hong Kong	Tianhe Natatorium, Guangzhou; Referees: Tan (SIN), Al-Saad (KUW)
25 November; 14:30	Score by quarters: 7–3, 3–1, 3–4, 7–3			Tianhe Natatorium, Guangzhou; Referees: Tan (SIN), Al-Saad (KUW)
25 November; 14:30	Al-Dughather 6	Goals	Zhao 4	Tianhe Natatorium, Guangzhou; Referees: Tan (SIN), Al-Saad (KUW)

==== Classification 5th–6th ====
25 November; 15:55	Athletes from Kuwait	5–4	Singapore	Tianhe Natatorium, Guangzhou; Referees: Makihashi (JPN), Bock (GER)
25 November; 15:55	Score by quarters: 1–1, 1–0, 1–1, 2–2			Tianhe Natatorium, Guangzhou; Referees: Makihashi (JPN), Bock (GER)
25 November; 15:55	N. Al-Otaibi, Bosakhar 2	Goals	Teo 3	Tianhe Natatorium, Guangzhou; Referees: Makihashi (JPN), Bock (GER)

==== Bronze medal match ====
25 November; 19:45	South Korea	5–19	Japan	Tianhe Natatorium, Guangzhou; Referees: Ni (CHN), Margeta (SLO)
25 November; 19:45	Score by quarters: 1–2, 2–5, 0–6, 2–6			Tianhe Natatorium, Guangzhou; Referees: Ni (CHN), Margeta (SLO)
25 November; 19:45	Kang, Lee D. 2	Goals	Shimizu 5	Tianhe Natatorium, Guangzhou; Referees: Ni (CHN), Margeta (SLO)

==== Gold medal match ====
25 November; 21:10	China	6–7	Kazakhstan	Tianhe Natatorium, Guangzhou; Referees: Stavridis (GRE), Koganov (AZE)
25 November; 21:10	Score by quarters: 4–2, 1–2, 0–1, 1–2			Tianhe Natatorium, Guangzhou; Referees: Stavridis (GRE), Koganov (AZE)
25 November; 21:10	Pan 4	Goals	Zhilyayev 2	Tianhe Natatorium, Guangzhou; Referees: Stavridis (GRE), Koganov (AZE)

== Final standing ==
Rank	Team	Pld	W	D	L
1st place, gold medalist(s)	Kazakhstan	6	6	0	0
2nd place, silver medalist(s)	China	7	6	0	1
3rd place, bronze medalist(s)	Japan	7	5	0	2
4	South Korea	7	3	0	4
5	Athletes from Kuwait	6	3	1	2
6	Singapore	6	2	1	3
7	Saudi Arabia	6	1	0	5
8	Hong Kong	7	1	0	6
9	Qatar	4	0	0	4
