= Water polo at the 2008 Summer Olympics – Men's team rosters =

This is a list of the players who were on the rosters of the given teams who participated in the 2008 Beijing Olympics for men's water polo. The men's tournament included twelve teams, with a maximum of thirteen players per team.

Abbreviations
Pos.	Position	№	Cap number
CF	Centre forward	CB	Centre back
D	Defense	GK	Goalkeeper

== Pool A ==
=== Australia ===
The following is the Australian roster in the men's water polo tournament of the 2008 Summer Olympics.

№	Name	Pos.	Height	Weight	Date of birth	Club
1	James Stanton	GK	1.98 m (6 ft 6 in)	93 kg (205 lb)	21 July 1983	(Spain) CN Novarra Barcelona
2	Richie Campbell	CB	1.93 m (6 ft 4 in)	92 kg (203 lb)	18 September 1987	(Spain) CN Barcelona
3	Trent Franklin	D	1.84 m (6 ft 0 in)	83 kg (183 lb)	12 February 1979	(Australia) Sydney ONI
4	Pietro Figlioli	D	1.90 m (6 ft 3 in)	94 kg (207 lb)	29 May 1984	(Italy) Chiavari Nouk
5	Robert Maitland	CB	1.90 m (6 ft 3 in)	95 kg (209 lb)	4 September 1983	(Spain) CN Mediferrow Barcelona
6	Anthony Martin	D	1.92 m (6 ft 4 in)	94 kg (207 lb)	22 March 1985	(Australia) KFC Breakers Brisbane
7	Tim Neesham	D	1.84 m (6 ft 0 in)	86 kg (190 lb)	20 October 1979	(Australia) Fremantle Perth
8	Sam McGregor	CB	1.92 m (6 ft 4 in)	95 kg (209 lb)	12 August 1984	(Spain) CN Alcorcon Madrid
9	Thomas Whalan	D	1.94 m (6 ft 4 in)	89 kg (196 lb)	13 October 1980	(Italy) Savona
10	Gavin Woods	CF	1.99 m (6 ft 6 in)	95 kg (209 lb)	1 March 1978	(Australia) Balmain Tigers Sydney
11	Rhys Howden	D	1.88 m (6 ft 2 in)	78 kg (172 lb)	2 April 1987	(Australia) Brisbane Barracudas
12	Jamie Beadsworth	CF	1.93 m (6 ft 4 in)	110 kg (240 lb)	11 June 1985	(Australia) Fremantle Perth
13	Rafael Sterk	GK	1.85 m (6 ft 1 in)	85 kg (187 lb)	27 January 1978	(Australia) KFC Breakers Brisbane

Head coach: John Fox

=== Canada ===
The following is the Canadian roster in the men's water polo tournament of the 2008 Summer Olympics.

№	Name	Pos.	Height	Weight	Date of birth	Club
1	Robin Randall	GK	1.97 m (6 ft 6 in)	85 kg (187 lb)	1 May 1980	(Canada) Regina Squids
2	Con Kudaba	CB	1.89 m (6 ft 2 in)	88 kg (194 lb)	17 May 1987	(Canada) Fraser Valley
3	Devon Diggle	D	1.83 m (6 ft 0 in)	83 kg (183 lb)	15 June 1988	(Canada) DDO Montreal
4	Kevin Mitchell	D	1.81 m (5 ft 11 in)	80 kg (180 lb)	21 June 1981	(Canada) Fraser Valley
5	Justin Boyd	D	1.83 m (6 ft 0 in)	86 kg (190 lb)	23 April 1989	(Canada) DDO Montreal
6	Thomas Marks	CB	1.90 m (6 ft 3 in)	90 kg (200 lb)	2 June 1980	(Canada) Vancouver Vikings
7	Brandon Jung	D	1.90 m (6 ft 3 in)	88 kg (194 lb)	28 April 1986	(Canada) Storm Vancouver
8	Kevin Graham	D	1.98 m (6 ft 6 in)	94 kg (207 lb)	21 April 1986	(Canada) Regina Squids
9	Aaron Feltham	D	1.90 m (6 ft 3 in)	94 kg (207 lb)	16 April 1982	(Canada) Lindsay
10	Sasa Palamarevic	CF	1.96 m (6 ft 5 in)	100 kg (220 lb)	16 July 1986	(Canada) Hull
11	Jean Sayegh	D	1.96 m (6 ft 5 in)	95 kg (209 lb)	18 June 1981	(Canada) Les Hydres de Quebec
12	Nathaniel Miller	CF	1.86 m (6 ft 1 in)	95 kg (209 lb)	21 September 1979	(Canada) DDO Montreal
13	Nic Youngblud	GK	1.80 m (5 ft 11 in)	80 kg (180 lb)	16 January 1981	(Canada) Hamilton Aquatic

Head coach: Dragan Jovanović

=== Greece ===
The following is the Greek roster in the men's water polo tournament of the 2008 Summer Olympics.

№	Name	Pos.	Height	Weight	Date of birth	Club
1	Nikolaos Deligiannis	GK	1.90 m (6 ft 3 in)	96 kg (212 lb)	3 September 1976	(Greece) Olympiacos
2	Anastasios Schizas	CB	1.91 m (6 ft 3 in)	91 kg (201 lb)	18 February 1977	(Greece) Olympiacos
3	Dimitrios Mazis	D	1.84 m (6 ft 0 in)	85 kg (187 lb)	5 September 1976	(Greece) Ethnikos Piraeus
4	Konstantinos Kokkinakis	CB	1.93 m (6 ft 4 in)	105 kg (231 lb)	9 October 1975	(Greece) Ethnikos Piraeus
5	Ioannis Thomakos	D	1.85 m (6 ft 1 in)	88 kg (194 lb)	14 March 1977	(Greece) Panionios
6	Argyris Theodoropoulos	D	1.85 m (6 ft 1 in)	90 kg (200 lb)	13 January 1981	(Greece) Olympiacos
7	Christos Afroudakis	D	1.88 m (6 ft 2 in)	88 kg (194 lb)	23 May 1984	(Greece) Olympiacos
8	Georgios Ntoskas	D	1.86 m (6 ft 1 in)	99 kg (218 lb)	11 November 1984	(Greece) Olympiacos
9	Georgios Afroudakis	CF	1.94 m (6 ft 4 in)	105 kg (231 lb)	17 October 1976	(Greece) Olympiacos
10	Dimitrios Miteloudis	CB	1.86 m (6 ft 1 in)	87 kg (192 lb)	11 February 1982	(Greece) Vouliagmeni
11	Antonios Vlontakis	CF	1.88 m (6 ft 2 in)	96 kg (212 lb)	10 October 1975	(Greece) Ethnikos Piraeus
12	Emmanouil Mylonakis	D	1.85 m (6 ft 1 in)	74 kg (163 lb)	9 April 1985	(Greece) Ethnikos Piraeus
13	Georgios Reppas	GK	1.89 m (6 ft 2 in)	88 kg (194 lb)	11 December 1974	(Greece) Panionios

Head coach: Alessandro Campagna

=== Hungary ===
The following is the Hungarian roster in the men's water polo tournament of the 2008 Summer Olympics.

№	Name	Pos.	Height	Weight	Date of birth	Club
1	Zoltán Szécsi	GK	1.98 m (6 ft 6 in)	96 kg (212 lb)	22 December 1977	(Hungary) ZF Eger
2	Tamás Varga	CB	2.01 m (6 ft 7 in)	105 kg (231 lb)	14 July 1975	(Hungary) Szeged Beton
3	Norbert Madaras	D	1.91 m (6 ft 3 in)	91 kg (201 lb)	1 December 1979	(Italy) Pro Recco
4	Dénes Varga	D	1.93 m (6 ft 4 in)	97 kg (214 lb)	29 March 1987	(Hungary) Vasas SC
5	Tamás Kásás	D	2.00 m (6 ft 7 in)	94 kg (207 lb)	20 July 1976	(Italy) Pro Recco
6	Norbert Hosnyánszky	D	1.96 m (6 ft 5 in)	94 kg (207 lb)	4 March 1984	(Italy) Fiorentina
7	Gergely Kiss	CF	1.99 m (6 ft 6 in)	112 kg (247 lb)	21 September 1977	(Hungary) Honvéd-Domino
8	Tibor Benedek	D	1.90 m (6 ft 3 in)	96 kg (212 lb)	12 July 1972	(Italy) Pro Recco
9	Dániel Varga	D	2.00 m (6 ft 7 in)	95 kg (209 lb)	25 September 1983	(Hungary) Vasas SC
10	Péter Biros	D	1.94 m (6 ft 4 in)	95 kg (209 lb)	5 April 1976	(Hungary) ZF Eger
11	Gábor Kis	CF	1.94 m (6 ft 4 in)	108 kg (238 lb)	27 September 1982	(Hungary) ZF Eger
12	Tamás Molnár	CF	1.93 m (6 ft 4 in)	104 kg (229 lb)	2 August 1975	(Hungary) Honvéd-Domino
13	István Gergely	GK	2.01 m (6 ft 7 in)	112 kg (247 lb)	20 August 1976	(Hungary) Honvéd-Domino

Head coach: Dénes Kemény

=== Montenegro ===
The following is the Montenegrin roster in the men's water polo tournament of the 2008 Summer Olympics.

№	Name	Pos.	Height	Weight	Date of birth	Club
1	Zdravko Radić	GK	1.93 m (6 ft 4 in)	95 kg (209 lb)	24 June 1979	(Montenegro) VK Primorac Kotor
2	Draško Brguljan	D	1.94 m (6 ft 4 in)	85 kg (187 lb)	27 December 1984	(Montenegro) VK Primorac Kotor
3	Vjekoslav Pasković	D	1.80 m (5 ft 11 in)	83 kg (183 lb)	23 March 1985	(Montenegro) VK Primorac Kotor
4	Nikola Vukčević	CF	1.99 m (6 ft 6 in)	107 kg (236 lb)	14 November 1985	(Montenegro) PVK Jadran
5	Nikola Janović	D	1.90 m (6 ft 3 in)	100 kg (220 lb)	22 March 1980	(Italy) Posillipo Naples
6	Milan Tičić	CB	1.97 m (6 ft 6 in)	95 kg (209 lb)	14 August 1979	(Montenegro) PVK Budvanska rivijera
7	Mlađan Janović	D	1.90 m (6 ft 3 in)	93 kg (205 lb)	11 June 1984	(Montenegro) VK Primorac Kotor
8	Veljko Uskoković	D	1.85 m (6 ft 1 in)	100 kg (220 lb)	29 March 1971	(Montenegro) PVK Budvanska rivijera
9	Aleksandar Ivović	CB	1.97 m (6 ft 6 in)	103 kg (227 lb)	24 February 1986	(Montenegro) PVK Jadran
10	Boris Zloković	CF	2.00 m (6 ft 7 in)	99 kg (218 lb)	16 March 1983	(Italy) Posillipo Naples
11	Vladimir Gojković	D	1.88 m (6 ft 2 in)	92 kg (203 lb)	29 January 1981	(Montenegro) PVK Jadran
12	Predrag Jokić	CB	1.95 m (6 ft 5 in)	92 kg (203 lb)	3 February 1983	(Italy) Pro Recco
13	Miloš Šćepanović	GK	1.85 m (6 ft 1 in)	88 kg (194 lb)	9 October 1982	(Montenegro) PVK Jadran

Head coach: Petar Porobić

=== Spain ===
The following is the Spanish roster in the men's water polo tournament of the 2008 Summer Olympics.

№	Name	Pos.	Height	Weight	Date of birth	Club
1	Iñaki Aguilar	GK	1.89 m (6 ft 2 in)	81 kg (179 lb)	9 September 1983	(Spain) CN Barcelona
2	Mario José García	CB	1.89 m (6 ft 2 in)	87 kg (192 lb)	15 July 1983	(Spain) CN Alcorcon
3	David Martín	D	1.77 m (5 ft 10 in)	80 kg (180 lb)	2 January 1977	(Spain) CN Atlètic-Barceloneta
4	Ricardo Perrone	D	1.78 m (5 ft 10 in)	76 kg (168 lb)	21 December 1976	(Spain) CN Barcelona
5	Guillermo Molina	D	1.95 m (6 ft 5 in)	112 kg (247 lb)	16 March 1984	(Italy) Brescia
6	Marc Minguell	CB	1.86 m (6 ft 1 in)	90 kg (200 lb)	14 January 1985	(Spain) CN Atlètic-Barceloneta
7	Iván Gallego	CB	1.86 m (6 ft 1 in)	100 kg (220 lb)	13 April 1984	(Spain) CN Terrassa
8	Svilen Piralkov	D	1.89 m (6 ft 2 in)	90 kg (200 lb)	8 April 1975	(Spain) CN Terrassa
9	Xavier Vallès	CF	1.92 m (6 ft 4 in)	102 kg (225 lb)	4 September 1979	(Spain) CN Atlètic-Barceloneta
10	Felipe Perrone	D	1.83 m (6 ft 0 in)	95 kg (209 lb)	27 February 1986	(Italy) Savona
11	Iván Pérez	CF	1.96 m (6 ft 5 in)	110 kg (240 lb)	29 June 1971	(Spain) CN Atlètic-Barceloneta
12	Xavier García	D	1.98 m (6 ft 6 in)	92 kg (203 lb)	5 January 1984	(Spain) CN Atlètic-Barceloneta
13	Ángel Andreo	GK	1.91 m (6 ft 3 in)	84 kg (185 lb)	3 December 1972	(Spain) Waterpolo Zaragoza

Head coach: Rafael Aguilar

== Group B ==
=== China ===
The following is the Chinese roster in the men's water polo tournament of the 2008 Summer Olympics.

№	Name	Pos.	Height	Weight	Date of birth	Club
1	Ge Weiqing	GK	1.85 m (6 ft 1 in)	90 kg (200 lb)	25 April 1977	(China) Shanghai
2	Liang Zhongxing	CB	1.98 m (6 ft 6 in)	98 kg (216 lb)	23 December 1986	(China) Guangdong Guangzhou
3	Wu Zhiyu	CB	1.98 m (6 ft 6 in)	108 kg (238 lb)	9 September 1983	(China) Shanghai
4	Yu Lijun	CF	1.96 m (6 ft 5 in)	108 kg (238 lb)	28 November 1978	(China) Shanghai
5	Li Jun	CB	1.88 m (6 ft 2 in)	85 kg (187 lb)	18 October 1980	(China) Huana Changsha
6	Tan Feihu	CF	1.90 m (6 ft 3 in)	98 kg (216 lb)	1 January 1987	(China) Huana Changsha
7	Wang Yong	D	1.84 m (6 ft 0 in)	90 kg (200 lb)	29 January 1979	(China) Shanghai
8	Li Bin	D	1.85 m (6 ft 1 in)	95 kg (209 lb)	24 October 1983	(China) Shanghai
9	Wang Beiming	D	1.87 m (6 ft 2 in)	96 kg (212 lb)	13 August 1983	(China) Shanghai
10	Xie Junmin	D	1.83 m (6 ft 0 in)	89 kg (196 lb)	17 May 1983	(China) Guangdong Guangzhou
11	Han Zhidong	D	1.82 m (6 ft 0 in)	80 kg (180 lb)	29 July 1977	(China) Guangdong Guangzhou
12	Wang Yang	D	1.86 m (6 ft 1 in)	78 kg (172 lb)	17 January 1983	(China) Guangdong Guangzhou
13	Ma Jianjun	GK	1.92 m (6 ft 4 in)	84 kg (185 lb)	8 October 1984	(China) Shanghai

Head coach: Wang Minhui

=== Croatia ===
The following is the Croatian roster in the men's water polo tournament of the 2008 Summer Olympics.

№	Name	Pos.	Height	Weight	Date of birth	Club
1	Frano Vićan	GK	1.92 m (6 ft 4 in)	94 kg (207 lb)	24 January 1976	(Croatia) VK Jug Dubrovnik
2	Damir Burić	CB	2.05 m (6 ft 9 in)	115 kg (254 lb)	2 December 1980	(Croatia) HAVK Mladost
3	Andro Bušlje	CB	1.99 m (6 ft 6 in)	105 kg (231 lb)	4 January 1986	(Croatia) VK Jug Dubrovnik
4	Zdeslav Vrdoljak	D	1.89 m (6 ft 2 in)	96 kg (212 lb)	15 March 1971	(Croatia) HAVK Mladost
5	Aljoša Kunac	CB	1.97 m (6 ft 6 in)	100 kg (220 lb)	18 August 1980	(Montenegro) Cattaro Kotor
6	Maro Joković	D	2.03 m (6 ft 8 in)	95 kg (209 lb)	1 October 1987	(Croatia) VK Jug Dubrovnik
7	Mile Smodlaka	CF	1.98 m (6 ft 6 in)	115 kg (254 lb)	1 January 1976	(Croatia) VK Jug Dubrovnik
8	Teo Đogaš	D	1.87 m (6 ft 2 in)	90 kg (200 lb)	19 February 1977	(Montenegro) Cattaro Kotor
9	Pavo Marković	D	1.90 m (6 ft 3 in)	92 kg (203 lb)	20 April 1985	(Croatia) VK Jug Dubrovnik
10	Samir Barač	D	1.88 m (6 ft 2 in)	95 kg (209 lb)	2 November 1973	(Croatia) Primorje EB
11	Igor Hinić	CF	2.02 m (6 ft 8 in)	110 kg (240 lb)	4 December 1975	(Croatia) HAVK Mladost
12	Miho Bošković	D	1.96 m (6 ft 5 in)	96 kg (212 lb)	11 January 1983	(Croatia) VK Jug Dubrovnik
13	Josip Pavić	GK	1.96 m (6 ft 5 in)	92 kg (203 lb)	15 January 1982	(Croatia) HAVK Mladost

Head coach: Ratko Rudić

=== Germany ===
The following is the German roster in the men's water polo tournament of the 2008 Summer Olympics.

№	Name	Pos.	Height	Weight	Date of birth	Club
1	Alexander Tchigir	GK	1.91 m (6 ft 3 in)	82 kg (181 lb)	6 November 1968	(Germany) Wasserfreunde Spandau 04
2	Florian Naroska	CB	1.98 m (6 ft 6 in)	102 kg (225 lb)	16 April 1982	(Germany) SSV Esslingen
3	Julian Real	CB	1.98 m (6 ft 6 in)	100 kg (220 lb)	22 December 1989	(Germany) Amateur SC Duisburg
4	Marko Savić	D	1.75 m (5 ft 9 in)	85 kg (187 lb)	11 January 1981	(Germany) Wasserfreunde Spandau 04
5	Marko Stamm	CB	1.85 m (6 ft 1 in)	90 kg (200 lb)	30 August 1988	(Germany) Wasserfreunde Spandau 04
6	Marc Politze	CF	1.96 m (6 ft 5 in)	100 kg (220 lb)	20 October 1977	(Germany) Wasserfreunde Spandau 04
7	Heiko Nossek	D	1.88 m (6 ft 2 in)	99 kg (218 lb)	14 March 1982	(Germany) SSV Esslingen
8	Thomas Schertwitis	CF	1.98 m (6 ft 6 in)	115 kg (254 lb)	2 September 1972	(Russia) Sintez Kazan
9	Tobias Kreuzmann	D	1.95 m (6 ft 5 in)	90 kg (200 lb)	15 June 1981	(Germany) Amateur SC Duisburg
10	Moritz Oeler	D	1.88 m (6 ft 2 in)	81 kg (179 lb)	21 October 1985	(Germany) Wasserfreunde Spandau 04
11	Andreas Schlotterbeck	CF	1.90 m (6 ft 3 in)	108 kg (238 lb)	2 March 1982	(Germany) Wasserfreunde Spandau 04
12	Sören Mackeben	D	1.83 m (6 ft 0 in)	85 kg (187 lb)	29 January 1979	(Germany) Wasserfreunde Spandau 04
13	Michael Zellmer	GK	1.90 m (6 ft 3 in)	95 kg (209 lb)	14 August 1977	(Germany) Waspo Hannover

Head coach: Hagen Stamm

=== Italy ===
The following is the Italian roster in the men's water polo tournament of the 2008 Summer Olympics.

№	Name	Pos.	Height	Weight	Date of birth	Club
1	Stefano Tempesti	GK	2.05 m (6 ft 9 in)	97 kg (214 lb)	9 June 1979	(Italy) Pro Recco
2	Luigi Di Costanzo	D	1.85 m (6 ft 1 in)	82 kg (181 lb)	5 February 1982	(Italy) Posillipo Naples
3	Leonardo Binchi	CB	2.00 m (6 ft 7 in)	100 kg (220 lb)	27 August 1975	(Italy) Brescia
4	Fabrizio Buonocore	CB	1.86 m (6 ft 1 in)	85 kg (187 lb)	28 April 1977	(Italy) Posillipo Naples
5	Valentino Gallo	D	1.93 m (6 ft 4 in)	90 kg (200 lb)	17 July 1985	(Italy) Posillipo Naples
6	Maurizio Felugo	D	1.89 m (6 ft 2 in)	82 kg (181 lb)	4 March 1981	(Italy) Pro Recco
7	Andrea Mangiante	CB	1.91 m (6 ft 3 in)	92 kg (203 lb)	1 July 1976	(Italy) Pro Recco
8	Alberto Angelini	D	1.76 m (5 ft 9 in)	85 kg (187 lb)	28 September 1974	(Italy) Pro Recco
9	Fabio Bencivenga	CF	2.01 m (6 ft 7 in)	97 kg (214 lb)	20 January 1976	(Italy) Posillipo Naples
10	Alessandro Calcaterra	CF	1.87 m (6 ft 2 in)	102 kg (225 lb)	26 May 1975	(Italy) Pro Recco
11	Leonardo Sottani	D	1.92 m (6 ft 4 in)	86 kg (190 lb)	1 November 1973	(Italy) Cremona
12	Federico Mistrangelo	D	1.81 m (5 ft 11 in)	80 kg (180 lb)	11 May 1981	(Italy) Savona
13	Fabio Violetti	GK	1.91 m (6 ft 3 in)	85 kg (187 lb)	1 February 1974	(Italy) Posillipo Naples

Head coach: Paolo Malara

=== Serbia ===
The following is the Serbian roster in the men's water polo tournament of the 2008 Summer Olympics.

№	Name	Pos.	Height	Weight	Date of birth	Club
1	Denis Šefik	GK	1.98 m (6 ft 6 in)	120 kg (260 lb)	20 September 1979	(Montenegro) PVK Budvanska rivijera
2	Andrija Prlainović	D	1.87 m (6 ft 2 in)	94 kg (207 lb)	28 April 1987	(Serbia) VK Partizan
3	Živko Gocić	CF	1.93 m (6 ft 4 in)	100 kg (220 lb)	22 August 1982	(Greece) Olympiacos
4	Vanja Udovičić	CB	1.95 m (6 ft 5 in)	102 kg (225 lb)	12 September 1982	(Italy) Pro Recco
5	Dejan Savić	CB	1.90 m (6 ft 3 in)	120 kg (260 lb)	24 April 1975	(Russia) Sintez Kazan
6	Duško Pijetlović	CF	1.92 m (6 ft 4 in)	102 kg (225 lb)	25 April 1985	(Serbia) VK Partizan
7	Nikola Rađen	CB	1.95 m (6 ft 5 in)	103 kg (227 lb)	29 January 1985	(Serbia) VK Partizan
8	Filip Filipović	D	1.97 m (6 ft 6 in)	100 kg (220 lb)	2 May 1987	(Serbia) VK Partizan
9	Aleksandar Ćirić	D	1.92 m (6 ft 4 in)	90 kg (200 lb)	30 December 1977	(Montenegro) PVK Budvanska rivijera
10	Aleksandar Šapić	D	1.88 m (6 ft 2 in)	100 kg (220 lb)	1 June 1978	(Russia) Shturm 2002 Chekhov
11	Vladimir Vujasinović	CB	1.87 m (6 ft 2 in)	98 kg (216 lb)	14 August 1973	(Serbia) VK Partizan
12	Branko Peković	CF	1.91 m (6 ft 3 in)	107 kg (236 lb)	7 May 1979	(Russia) Dynamo Moscow
13	Slobodan Soro	GK	1.96 m (6 ft 5 in)	100 kg (220 lb)	23 December 1978	(Serbia) VK Partizan

Head coach: Dejan Udovičić

=== United States ===
The following is the American roster in the men's water polo tournament of the 2008 Summer Olympics.

№	Name	Pos.	Height	Weight	Date of birth	Club
1	Merrill Moses	GK	1.91 m (6 ft 3 in)	98 kg (216 lb)	13 August 1977	(United States) The New York Athletic Club
2	Peter Varellas	D	1.91 m (6 ft 3 in)	86 kg (190 lb)	2 October 1984	(United States) Olympic Club
3	Peter Hudnut	CB	1.96 m (6 ft 5 in)	102 kg (225 lb)	16 February 1980	(United States) Los Angeles WP Club
4	Jeff Powers	CB	2.01 m (6 ft 7 in)	109 kg (240 lb)	21 January 1980	(United States) Newport Aquatics Foundation
5	Adam Wright	D	1.91 m (6 ft 3 in)	88 kg (194 lb)	4 May 1977	(United States) The New York Athletic Club
6	Rick Merlo	D	1.91 m (6 ft 3 in)	98 kg (216 lb)	5 August 1982	(United States) The New York Athletic Club
7	Layne Beaubien	D	1.98 m (6 ft 6 in)	100 kg (220 lb)	4 July 1976	(United States) The New York Athletic Club
8	Tony Azevedo	D	1.85 m (6 ft 1 in)	91 kg (201 lb)	21 November 1981	(United States) The New York Athletic Club
9	Ryan Bailey	CF	1.98 m (6 ft 6 in)	111 kg (245 lb)	28 August 1975	(United States) Newport Aquatics Foundation
10	Tim Hutten	CB	1.96 m (6 ft 5 in)	100 kg (220 lb)	4 June 1985	(United States) Newport Aquatics Foundation
11	Jesse Smith	CB	1.93 m (6 ft 4 in)	105 kg (231 lb)	27 April 1983	(United States) Los Angeles WP Club
12	J. W. Krumpholz	CF	1.91 m (6 ft 3 in)	93 kg (205 lb)	22 November 1987	(United States) Los Angeles WP Club
13	Brandon Brooks	GK	1.98 m (6 ft 6 in)	111 kg (245 lb)	29 April 1981	(United States) Los Angeles WP Club

Head coach: Terry Schroeder

== See also ==
- Water polo at the 2008 Summer Olympics – Women's team rosters
