= Water polo at the 2014 Asian Games – Men's tournament =

Men at the 2014 Asian Games
- Venue: Dream Park Aquatics Center
- Date: 25 September – 1 October 2014
- Competitors: 91 from 7 nations

Medalists
| gold medal | Kazakhstan |
| silver medal | Japan |
| bronze medal | China |

Men's water polo at the 2014 Asian Games was held in Dream Park Aquatics Center, Incheon, Korea from 25 September to 1 October 2014.

== Squads ==
| China | Hong Kong | Japan | Kazakhstan |
|---|---|---|---|
| Wu Honghui; Tan Feihu; Liang Zhongxing; Yu Lijun; Guo Junliang; Pan Ning; Li Bin; Wang Yang; Dong Tao; Chen Jinghao; Zhang Chufeng; Liang Nianxiang; Liang Zhiwei | Chan Ka Wo; Howard Cheng; Cheung Hok Him; Fung Kong Ching; Au Ki Ming; Toby To; Chan Ho Hin; Ku Yat Wa; Cheng Hei Man; Cheung Tsun Yu; Po Yue Kai; Johnathan Liauw; Liu Hin Lok | Katsuyuki Tanamura; Seiya Adachi; Atsushi Arai; Mitsuaki Shiga; Akira Yanase; Yuta Henmi; Yusuke Shimizu; Yuki Kadono; Koji Takei; Kenya Yasuda; Keigo Okawa; Shota Hazui; Tomoyoshi Fukushima | Madikhan Makhmetov; Sergey Gubarev; Alexandr Axenov; Roman Pilipenko; Vladimir Ushakov; Alexey Shmider; Murat Shakenov; Anton Koliadenko; Rustam Ukumanov; Andrey Rekechinskiy; Alexey Panfili; Branko Peković; Alexandr Fedorov |
| Kuwait | Singapore | South Korea | |
| Mohammad Al-Mulla; Jasem Al-Safran; Meshari Nasser; Mohammad Al-Rumaidheen; Abdulwahab Al-Dousari; Ali Al-Mujadi; Marzouq Al-Ajmi; Ahmad Mandani; Abdulaziz Saudoun; Mohammad Al-Boloushi; Mohammad Ashour; Ali Esmaeil; Yaqoub Al-Tamimi | Nigel Tay; Lin Diyang; Loh Zhi Zhi; Eugene Teo; Lim Yaoxiang; Paul Louis Tan; Chiam Kun Yang; Ang An Jun; Marcus Goh; Sean Ang; Yip Yang; Koh Jian Ying; Lee Kai Yang | Song Geun-ho; Park Jeong-min; Yoo Byeong-jin; Lee Seon-uk; Youn Young-gwan; Jung Ju-hwa; Gwon Yeong-gyun; Kim Won-min; Chu Min-jong; Kang Jun-won; Song Won-ho; Lee Hyeon-woo; Lee Seung-hun | |

== Results ==
All times are Korea Standard Time (UTC+09:00)

=== Preliminary round ===
==== Group A ====
| Pos | Team | Pld | W | D | L | GF | GA | GD | Pts | Qualification |
|---|---|---|---|---|---|---|---|---|---|---|
| 1 | Kazakhstan | 3 | 3 | 0 | 0 | 62 | 15 | +47 | 6 | Semifinals |
| 2 | South Korea | 3 | 2 | 0 | 1 | 30 | 32 | −2 | 4 | Quarterfinals |
| 3 | Singapore | 3 | 1 | 0 | 2 | 30 | 33 | −3 | 2 | Quarterfinals |
| 4 | Hong Kong | 3 | 0 | 0 | 3 | 10 | 52 | −42 | 0 | |

Source: Results

| 25 September; 17:00 | Singapore | 13–4 | Hong Kong | Dream Park Aquatics Center, Incheon; Referees: Anbar (KUW), Ni (CHN) |
| 25 September; 17:00 | Score by quarters: 3–2, 3–0, 4–2, 3–0 | | | Dream Park Aquatics Center, Incheon; Referees: Anbar (KUW), Ni (CHN) |
| 25 September; 17:00 | Teo 5 | Goals | four players 1 | Dream Park Aquatics Center, Incheon; Referees: Anbar (KUW), Ni (CHN) |

| 25 September; 19:00 | Kazakhstan | 18–6 | South Korea | Dream Park Aquatics Center, Incheon; Referees: Borrell (ESP), Alexandrescu (ROU) |
| 25 September; 19:00 | Score by quarters: 4–1, 6–1, 4–3, 4–1 | | | Dream Park Aquatics Center, Incheon; Referees: Borrell (ESP), Alexandrescu (ROU) |
| 25 September; 19:00 | Gubarev 6 | Goals | Gwon 2 | Dream Park Aquatics Center, Incheon; Referees: Borrell (ESP), Alexandrescu (ROU) |

| 26 September; 17:00 | Hong Kong | 0–24 | Kazakhstan | Dream Park Aquatics Center, Incheon; Referees: Tan (SIN), Lee (KOR) |
| 26 September; 17:00 | Score by quarters: 0–6, 0–6, 0–10, 0–2 | | | Dream Park Aquatics Center, Incheon; Referees: Tan (SIN), Lee (KOR) |
| 26 September; 17:00 | 0 | Goals | Peković 8 | Dream Park Aquatics Center, Incheon; Referees: Tan (SIN), Lee (KOR) |

| 26 September; 19:00 | South Korea | 9–8 | Singapore | Dream Park Aquatics Center, Incheon; Referees: Fukumoto (JPN), Anbar (KUW) |
| 26 September; 19:00 | Score by quarters: 3–2, 3–2, 2–2, 1–2 | | | Dream Park Aquatics Center, Incheon; Referees: Fukumoto (JPN), Anbar (KUW) |
| 26 September; 19:00 | Park, Youn, Kim 2 | Goals | Tan, Yip 2 | Dream Park Aquatics Center, Incheon; Referees: Fukumoto (JPN), Anbar (KUW) |

| 27 September; 17:00 | South Korea | 15–6 | Hong Kong | Dream Park Aquatics Center, Incheon; Referees: Ni (CHN), Fukumoto (JPN) |
| 27 September; 17:00 | Score by quarters: 6–3, 3–1, 3–2, 3–0 | | | Dream Park Aquatics Center, Incheon; Referees: Ni (CHN), Fukumoto (JPN) |
| 27 September; 17:00 | Gwon 4 | Goals | Fung 2 | Dream Park Aquatics Center, Incheon; Referees: Ni (CHN), Fukumoto (JPN) |

| 27 September; 19:00 | Singapore | 9–20 | Kazakhstan | Dream Park Aquatics Center, Incheon; Referees: Simonyan (HKG), Lee (KOR) |
| 27 September; 19:00 | Score by quarters: 0–7, 2–4, 4–4, 3–5 | | | Dream Park Aquatics Center, Incheon; Referees: Simonyan (HKG), Lee (KOR) |
| 27 September; 19:00 | Loh, Teo, Tan 2 | Goals | Peković 6 | Dream Park Aquatics Center, Incheon; Referees: Simonyan (HKG), Lee (KOR) |

==== Group B ====
| Pos | Team | Pld | W | D | L | GF | GA | GD | Pts | Qualification |
|---|---|---|---|---|---|---|---|---|---|---|
| 1 | Japan | 2 | 2 | 0 | 0 | 33 | 17 | +16 | 4 | Semifinals |
| 2 | China | 2 | 1 | 0 | 1 | 27 | 16 | +11 | 2 | Quarterfinals |
| 3 | Kuwait | 2 | 0 | 0 | 2 | 12 | 39 | −27 | 0 | Quarterfinals |

Source: Results

| 25 September; 15:00 | China | 9–12 | Japan | Dream Park Aquatics Center, Incheon; Referees: Periš (CRO), Stavridis (GRE) |
| 25 September; 15:00 | Score by quarters: 2–4, 4–4, 2–2, 1–2 | | | Dream Park Aquatics Center, Incheon; Referees: Periš (CRO), Stavridis (GRE) |
| 25 September; 15:00 | Tan, Pan 4 | Goals | Takei 4 | Dream Park Aquatics Center, Incheon; Referees: Periš (CRO), Stavridis (GRE) |

| 26 September; 15:00 | Japan | 21–8 | Kuwait | Dream Park Aquatics Center, Incheon; Referees: Simonyan (HKG), Salnichenko (KAZ) |
| 26 September; 15:00 | Score by quarters: 7–2, 5–2, 3–2, 6–2 | | | Dream Park Aquatics Center, Incheon; Referees: Simonyan (HKG), Salnichenko (KAZ) |
| 26 September; 15:00 | Yasuda 4 | Goals | Al-Rumaidheen, Ashour 4 | Dream Park Aquatics Center, Incheon; Referees: Simonyan (HKG), Salnichenko (KAZ) |

| 27 September; 15:00 | Kuwait | 4–18 | China | Dream Park Aquatics Center, Incheon; Referees: Tan (SIN), Salnichenko (KAZ) |
| 27 September; 15:00 | Score by quarters: 0–5, 2–5, 2–5, 0–3 | | | Dream Park Aquatics Center, Incheon; Referees: Tan (SIN), Salnichenko (KAZ) |
| 27 September; 15:00 | Saudoun 3 | Goals | Chen 4 | Dream Park Aquatics Center, Incheon; Referees: Tan (SIN), Salnichenko (KAZ) |

=== Final round ===
Quarterfinals
29 September
Singapore | 5
China | 25
29 September
South Korea | 11
Kuwait | 9

Semifinals
30 September
Kazakhstan (p) | 6 (5)
China | 6 (3)
30 September
Japan | 13
South Korea | 5

Gold medal match
1 October
Kazakhstan | 7
Japan | 6
Bronze medal match
1 October
China | 14
South Korea | 6

==== Quarterfinals ====
| 29 September; 15:00 | Singapore | 5–25 | China | Dream Park Aquatics Center, Incheon; Referees: Lee (KOR), Anbar (KUW) |
| 29 September; 15:00 | Score by quarters: 1–7, 0–8, 1–4, 3–6 | | | Dream Park Aquatics Center, Incheon; Referees: Lee (KOR), Anbar (KUW) |
| 29 September; 15:00 | S. Ang 2 | Goals | Tan 5 | Dream Park Aquatics Center, Incheon; Referees: Lee (KOR), Anbar (KUW) |

| 29 September; 17:00 | South Korea | 11–9 | Kuwait | Dream Park Aquatics Center, Incheon; Referees: Periš (CRO), Stavridis (GRE) |
| 29 September; 17:00 | Score by quarters: 3–3, 4–3, 3–3, 1–0 | | | Dream Park Aquatics Center, Incheon; Referees: Periš (CRO), Stavridis (GRE) |
| 29 September; 17:00 | Lee S.U., Jung 3 | Goals | Ashour, Esmaeil 2 | Dream Park Aquatics Center, Incheon; Referees: Periš (CRO), Stavridis (GRE) |

==== Semifinals ====
| 30 September; 17:00 | Kazakhstan | 11–9 (PSO) | China | Dream Park Aquatics Center, Incheon; Referees: Alexandrescu (ROU), Periš (CRO) |
| 30 September; 17:00 | Score by quarters: 1–2, 3–1, 0–2, 2–1 PSO: 5–3 | | | Dream Park Aquatics Center, Incheon; Referees: Alexandrescu (ROU), Periš (CRO) |
| 30 September; 17:00 | four players 2 | Goals | Wang, Zhang 3 | Dream Park Aquatics Center, Incheon; Referees: Alexandrescu (ROU), Periš (CRO) |

| 30 September; 19:00 | Japan | 13–5 | South Korea | Dream Park Aquatics Center, Incheon; Referees: Ni (CHN), Anbar (KUW) |
| 30 September; 19:00 | Score by quarters: 3–4, 1–1, 2–0, 7–0 | | | Dream Park Aquatics Center, Incheon; Referees: Ni (CHN), Anbar (KUW) |
| 30 September; 19:00 | Adachi, Hazui 3 | Goals | Kang 2 | Dream Park Aquatics Center, Incheon; Referees: Ni (CHN), Anbar (KUW) |

==== Classification 5th–6th place ====
| 30 September; 15:00 | Singapore | 10–6 | Kuwait | Dream Park Aquatics Center, Incheon; Referees: Borrell (ESP), Stavridis (GRE) |
| 30 September; 15:00 | Score by quarters: 1–2, 1–2, 5–0, 3–2 | | | Dream Park Aquatics Center, Incheon; Referees: Borrell (ESP), Stavridis (GRE) |
| 30 September; 15:00 | Teo 3 | Goals | Ashour 2 | Dream Park Aquatics Center, Incheon; Referees: Borrell (ESP), Stavridis (GRE) |

==== Bronze medal match ====
| 1 October; 14:00 | China | 14–6 | South Korea | Dream Park Aquatics Center, Incheon; Referees: Salnichenko (KAZ), Fukumoto (JPN) |
| 1 October; 14:00 | Score by quarters: 4–1, 0–2, 5–1, 5–2 | | | Dream Park Aquatics Center, Incheon; Referees: Salnichenko (KAZ), Fukumoto (JPN) |
| 1 October; 14:00 | Tan 5 | Goals | Jung 3 | Dream Park Aquatics Center, Incheon; Referees: Salnichenko (KAZ), Fukumoto (JPN) |

==== Gold medal match ====
| 1 October; 16:00 | Kazakhstan | 7–6 | Japan | Dream Park Aquatics Center, Incheon; Referees: Borrell (ESP), Stavridis (GRE) |
| 1 October; 16:00 | Score by quarters: 1–0, 3–2, 2–1, 1–3 | | | Dream Park Aquatics Center, Incheon; Referees: Borrell (ESP), Stavridis (GRE) |
| 1 October; 16:00 | Axenov 3 | Goals | Shiga, Takei 2 | Dream Park Aquatics Center, Incheon; Referees: Borrell (ESP), Stavridis (GRE) |

== Final standing ==
| Rank | Team | Pld | W | D | L |
|---|---|---|---|---|---|
| 1st place, gold medalist(s) | Kazakhstan | 5 | 5 | 0 | 0 |
| 2nd place, silver medalist(s) | Japan | 4 | 3 | 0 | 1 |
| 3rd place, bronze medalist(s) | China | 5 | 3 | 0 | 2 |
| 4 | South Korea | 6 | 3 | 0 | 3 |
| 5 | Singapore | 5 | 2 | 0 | 3 |
| 6 | Kuwait | 4 | 0 | 0 | 4 |
| 7 | Hong Kong | 3 | 0 | 0 | 3 |
