= Water polo at the 2014 Asian Games =

- Venue: Dream Park Aquatics Center
- Dates: 20 September – 1 October 2014
- Competitors: 168 from 8 nations

Water polo at the 2014 Asian Games was held in Dream Park Aquatics Center, Incheon, South Korea from 20 September to 1 October 2014.

== Schedule ==
●	Round	●	Last round	P	Preliminary round	¼	Quarterfinals	½	Semifinals	F	Finals

Event↓/Date →	20th Sat	21st Sun	22nd Mon	23rd Tue	24th Wed	25th Thu	26th Fri	27th Sat	28th Sun	29th Mon	30th Tue	1st Wed
Men						P	P	P		¼	½	F
Women	●	●	●	●	●							

== Medalists ==
Event	Gold	Silver	Bronze
Men	Kazakhstan; Madikhan Makhmetov; Sergey Gubarev; Alexandr Axenov; Roman Pilipenko; Vladimir Ushakov; Alexey Shmider; Murat Shakenov; Anton Koliadenko; Rustam Ukumanov; Andrey Rekechinskiy; Alexey Panfili; Branko Peković; Alexandr Fedorov	Japan; Katsuyuki Tanamura; Seiya Adachi; Atsushi Arai; Mitsuaki Shiga; Akira Yanase; Yuta Henmi; Yusuke Shimizu; Yuki Kadono; Koji Takei; Kenya Yasuda; Keigo Okawa; Shota Hazui; Tomoyoshi Fukushima	China; Wu Honghui; Tan Feihu; Liang Zhongxing; Yu Lijun; Guo Junliang; Pan Ning; Li Bin; Wang Yang; Dong Tao; Chen Jinghao; Zhang Chufeng; Liang Nianxiang; Liang Zhiwei
Women	China; Yang Jun; Li Shujin; Liu Ping; Sun Yujun; Chen Huili; Sun Yating; Song Donglun; Zhang Cong; Zhao Zihan; Tian Jianing; Wang Xinyan; Lu Yiwen; Peng Lin	Japan; Rikako Miura; Midori Sugiyama; Saki Ogawa; Shino Magariyama; Moe Nakata; Ayaka Takahashi; Yumi Nakano; Misa Shiga; Yumi Kojo; Tsubasa Mori; Erina Kakiichi; Mitsuki Hashiguchi; Yuko Umeda	Kazakhstan; Alexandra Zharkova; Natalya Shepelina; Aizhan Akilbayeva; Anna Turova; Kamila Zakirova; Anastassiya Mirshina; Zamira Myrzabekova; Oxana Saichuk; Assel Jakayeva; Marina Gritsenko; Natalya Alexandrova; Aruzhan Yegemberdiyeva; Kristina Krassikova

== Medal table ==
Rank	Nation	Gold	Silver	Bronze	Total
1	China (CHN)	1	0	1	2
1	Kazakhstan (KAZ)	1	0	1	2
3	Japan (JPN)	0	2	0	2
Totals (3 entries)		2	2	2	6

== Draw ==
A draw ceremony was held on 21 August 2014 to determine the groups for the men's competition. The teams were seeded based on their final ranking at the 2010 Asian Games. The women were played in round robin format.

Group A

- Kazakhstan (1)
- South Korea (4)
- Singapore
- Hong Kong

Group B

- China (2)
- Japan (3)
- Kuwait

== Final standing ==
=== Men ===
Rank	Team	Pld	W	D	L
1st place, gold medalist(s)	Kazakhstan	5	5	0	0
2nd place, silver medalist(s)	Japan	4	3	0	1
3rd place, bronze medalist(s)	China	5	3	0	2
4	South Korea	6	3	0	3
5	Singapore	5	2	0	3
6	Kuwait	4	0	0	4
7	Hong Kong	3	0	0	3

=== Women ===
Rank	Team	Pld	W	D	L
1st place, gold medalist(s)	China	5	5	0	0
2nd place, silver medalist(s)	Japan	5	3	1	1
3rd place, bronze medalist(s)	Kazakhstan	5	3	1	1
4	Uzbekistan	5	2	0	3
5	Singapore	5	1	0	4
6	Hong Kong	5	0	0	5
