= Water polo at the 2010 Asian Games =

- Venue: Tianhe Natatorium
- Dates: 15–25 November 2010
- Competitors: 168 from 11 nations

Water polo at the 2010 Asian Games was held in Guangzhou, Guangdong, China from November 13 to 25, 2010. In this tournament, nine teams played in the men's competition, while the women's tournament made their first participation with four teams.

== Schedule ==
●	Round	●	Last round	P	Preliminary round	¼	Quarterfinals	½	Semifinals	F	Finals

Event↓/Date →	15th Mon	16th Tue	17th Wed	18th Thu	19th Fri	20th Sat	21st Sun	22nd Mon	23rd Tue	24th Wed	25th Thu
Men				P	P	P	P	P	¼	½	F
Women	●	●	●								

== Medalists ==
Event	Gold	Silver	Bronze
Men	Kazakhstan; Alexandr Shvedov; Sergey Gubarev; Alexandr Gaidukov; Murat Shakenov; Alexey Panfili; Roman Pilipenko; Alexandr Axenov; Rustam Ukumanov; Yevgeniy Zhilyayev; Mikhail Ruday; Ravil Manafov; Azamat Zhulumbetov; Nikolay Maximov	China; Ge Weiqing; Tan Feihu; Liang Zhongxing; Yu Lijun; Guo Junliang; Pan Ning; Li Bin; Wang Yang; Xie Junmin; Wang Beiming; Han Zhidong; Jiang Bin; Huang Meicai	Japan; Katsuyuki Tanamura; Mitsuaki Shiga; Kan Irei; Koji Takei; Kan Aoyagi; Hiroki Wakamatsu; Yusuke Shimizu; Akira Yanase; Koji Kobayashi; Yoshinori Shiota; Atsushi Naganuma; Satoshi Nagata; Shota Hazui
Women	China; Yang Jun; Teng Fei; Liu Ping; Sun Yujun; He Jin; Sun Yating; Song Donglun; Zhang Weiwei; Wang Yi; Ma Huanhuan; Sun Huizi; Zhang Lei; Wang Ying	Kazakhstan; Galina Rytova; Natalya Shepelina; Kamila Zakirova; Anna Turova; Liliya Falaleyeva; Anna Zubkova; Zamira Myrzabekova; Yekaterina Gariyeva; Aizhan Akilbayeva; Marina Gritsenko; Yelena Chebotova; Assem Mussarova; Alexandra Turova	Uzbekistan; Anastasiya Skovpina; Diana Dadabaeva; Aleksandra Sarancha; Eseniya Piftor; Evgeniya Ivanova; Natalya Plyusova; Anna Shcheglova; Ramilya Khalikova; Adelina Zinurova; Olga Mayorova; Anna Plyusova; Elena Dukhanova

== Medal table ==
Rank	Nation	Gold	Silver	Bronze	Total
1	China (CHN)	1	1	0	2
1	Kazakhstan (KAZ)	1	1	0	2
3	Japan (JPN)	0	0	1	1
3	Uzbekistan (UZB)	0	0	1	1
Totals (4 entries)		2	2	2	6

== Draw ==
The draw ceremony for the team sports was held on 7 October 2010 at Guangzhou. The men were drawn into two groups of five teams, and the women played in round robin format. The teams were seeded based on their final ranking at the 2009 Asian Championships.

Group A

- China (Host)
- Japan (3)
- Qatar
- South Korea
- Hong Kong

Group B

- Kazakhstan (2)
- Athletes from Kuwait (4)
- Singapore
- ~~Iran~~*
- Saudi Arabia

* Iran withdrew shortly after the draw.

== Final standing ==
=== Men ===
Rank	Team	Pld	W	D	L
1st place, gold medalist(s)	Kazakhstan	6	6	0	0
2nd place, silver medalist(s)	China	7	6	0	1
3rd place, bronze medalist(s)	Japan	7	5	0	2
4	South Korea	7	3	0	4
5	Athletes from Kuwait	6	3	1	2
6	Singapore	6	2	1	3
7	Saudi Arabia	6	1	0	5
8	Hong Kong	7	1	0	6
9	Qatar	4	0	0	4

=== Women ===
Rank	Team	Pld	W	D	L
1st place, gold medalist(s)	China	3	3	0	0
2nd place, silver medalist(s)	Kazakhstan	3	2	0	1
3rd place, bronze medalist(s)	Uzbekistan	3	1	0	2
4	India	3	0	0	3
