= Water polo at the 2006 Asian Games =

- Venue: Al-Sadd Aquatic Centre
- Dates: 6–14 December 2006
- Competitors: 112 from 10 nations

Water polo was contested by men's teams at the 2006 Asian Games in Doha, Qatar from December 6 to December 14, 2006. Ten teams competed in two round robin groups. All games were staged at the Al-Sadd Aquatic Centre.

== Schedule ==
P	Preliminary round	C	Classification	½	Semifinals	F	Finals

Event↓/Date →	6th Wed	7th Thu	8th Fri	9th Sat	10th Sun	11th Mon	12th Tue	13th Wed	14th Thu
Men	P	P	P	P	P		½	C	F

== Medalists ==
Event	Gold	Silver	Bronze
Men	China; Ge Weiqing; Wu Zhiyu; Tan Feihu; Yu Lijun; Li Jun; Liang Zhongxing; Li Bin; Wang Yong; Guo Junliang; Xie Junmin; Han Zhidong; Liu Siwei	Japan; Tomonaga Eguchi; Kan Aoyagi; Yasuhiro Haraguchi; Naofumi Nishikakoi; Koji Tanaka; Shoichi Sakamoto; Koji Kobayashi; Atsushi Naganuma; Taichi Sato; Yoshinori Shiota; Hiroshi Hoshiai; Satoshi Nagata; Hitoshi Oshima	Kazakhstan; Alexandr Shvedov; Sergey Gorovoy; Azamat Zhulumbetov; Yevgeniy Medvedev; Alan Orazalinov; Ruslan Orazalinov; Damir Temyrkhanov; Ivan Zaitsev; Rustam Ukumanov; Alexandr Gaidukov; Ravil Manafov; Adil Temyrkhanov; Dmitriy Axyonkin

== Draw ==
The draw ceremony for the team sports was held on 7 September 2006 at Doha.

Group A

- Qatar
- Iran
- Philippines
- South Korea
- Kazakhstan

Group B

- Japan
- China
- Hong Kong
- Saudi Arabia
- Uzbekistan

== Squads ==
Squads

China	Hong Kong	Iran	Japan
Ge Weiqing; Wu Zhiyu; Tan Feihu; Yu Lijun; Li Jun; Liang Zhongxing; Li Bin; Wang Yong; Guo Junliang; Xie Junmin; Han Zhidong; Liu Siwei	Cheung Man Bun; Jonathan Lo; Koo Yu Fat; Miguel Antonio Wong; Klint Fung; Fu Yiu; Howard Wong; Ku Yat Wa; Tam Hin Wing; Chung Ching Nam; Albert Chan; John Wong; Douglas Woo	Alireza Shahidipour; Bahman Mouchehkiani; Saeid Mirmehdi; Milad Mohammadi; Mohammad Mehdi Tayyaran; Mehdi Karami; Amir Abbas Akbarnejad; Soheil Khadempir; Kambiz Rakhshanimehr; Yashar Soltani; Arameh Aghazarian; Mohsen Rezvani; Meisam Jafari	Tomonaga Eguchi; Kan Aoyagi; Yasuhiro Haraguchi; Naofumi Nishikakoi; Koji Tanaka; Shoichi Sakamoto; Koji Kobayashi; Atsushi Naganuma; Taichi Sato; Yoshinori Shiota; Hiroshi Hoshiai; Satoshi Nagata; Hitoshi Oshima
Kazakhstan	Philippines	Qatar	Saudi Arabia
Alexandr Shvedov; Sergey Gorovoy; Azamat Zhulumbetov; Yevgeniy Medvedev; Alan Orazalinov; Ruslan Orazalinov; Damir Temyrkhanov; Ivan Zaitsev; Rustam Ukumanov; Alexandr Gaidukov; Ravil Manafov; Adil Temyrkhanov; Dmitriy Axyonkin	The water polo team of the Philippines had withdrawn from the Asian Games, but the withdrawal was not properly relayed to the event organizers. Thus, the Philippine water polo team remained in the 10-team roster of the competition.	Saad Al-Oulan; Mohammed Hamad; Ali Abdin; Mohammed Al-Shahrani; Abdulla Al-Obaidli; Abdulla Al-Hammadi; Ali Al-Lingawi; Morshid Al-Robaan; Mohammed Al-Kuwari; Nayef Al-Shahrani; Abdulla Al-Shahrani; Hassan Al-Hammadi; Ahmed Al-Hammadi	Bandar Al-Zahrani; Baseem Al-Harbi; Adel Al-Najjar; Yasser Al-Zahrani; Saleh Al-Zahrani; Khaled Al-Malki; Ahmed Al-Shammari; Khaled Al-Harbi; Waleed Al-Ghamdi; Adel Al-Malki; Hussain Jazani; Yousri Al-Laili; Nasser Al-Dughather
South Korea	Uzbekistan		
Maeng Sung-hoon; Park Jun-jong; Kim Hyun-jong; Lee Sang-young; Kim Won-min; Jung Ju-hwa; Lee Myung-woo; Baek Won-ki; Park Bong-soo; Kim Jong-whan	Nikita Manakov; Ivan Spiridonov; Ravil Valishev; Andrey Gorodchanin; Vangelis Divin; Rais Kovyazin; Aleksandr Yashnov; Artyom Mormul; Vyacheslav Gorshkov; Stepan Palchikov; Maksim Pashkanov; Timur Kayumov		

== Results ==
All times are Arabia Standard Time (UTC+03:00)

=== Preliminaries ===
==== Group A ====
Pos	Team	Pld	W	D	L	GF	GA	GD	Pts	Qualification
1	Kazakhstan	4	3	1	0	46	19	+27	7 (Note: Head-to-head result: KAZ 10–10 IRI. Goal difference against the highest placed team (KOR): KAZ +8, IRI +5.)	Semifinals
2	Iran	4	3	1	0	46	22	+24	7	Semifinals
3	South Korea	4	2	0	2	50	32	+18	4	Classification 5th–8th
4	Qatar	4	1	0	3	17	66	−49	2	Classification 5th–8th
5	Philippines	4	0	0	4	0	20	−20	0	

Source: Results
Notes:

6 December; 17:00	Philippines	0–5	South Korea	Al-Sadd Aquatic Centre, Doha
6 December; 17:00	Walkover			Al-Sadd Aquatic Centre, Doha

6 December; 18:30	Iran	10–10	Kazakhstan	Al-Sadd Aquatic Centre, Doha; Referees: Stampalija (CRO), Brguljan (MNE)
6 December; 18:30	Score by quarters: 2–3, 1–2, 4–2, 3–3			Al-Sadd Aquatic Centre, Doha; Referees: Stampalija (CRO), Brguljan (MNE)
6 December; 18:30	Mirmehdi, Soltani 4	Goals	five players 2	Al-Sadd Aquatic Centre, Doha; Referees: Stampalija (CRO), Brguljan (MNE)

7 December; 10:00	Kazakhstan	5–0	Philippines	Al-Sadd Aquatic Centre, Doha
7 December; 10:00	Walkover			Al-Sadd Aquatic Centre, Doha

7 December; 11:30	Qatar	3–17	Iran	Al-Sadd Aquatic Centre, Doha; Referees: Ni (CHN), Al-Sheaifi (KSA)
7 December; 11:30	Score by quarters: 0–3, 1–4, 2–2, 0–8			Al-Sadd Aquatic Centre, Doha; Referees: Ni (CHN), Al-Sheaifi (KSA)
7 December; 11:30	Hamad, A. Al-Shahrani, H. Al-Hammadi 1	Goals	Mirmehdi 5	Al-Sadd Aquatic Centre, Doha; Referees: Ni (CHN), Al-Sheaifi (KSA)

8 December; 17:00	South Korea	5–13	Kazakhstan	Al-Sadd Aquatic Centre, Doha; Referees: Vuletić (CRO), Brguljan (MNE)
8 December; 17:00	Score by quarters: 1–5, 0–5, 0–2, 4–1			Al-Sadd Aquatic Centre, Doha; Referees: Vuletić (CRO), Brguljan (MNE)
8 December; 17:00	Baek 2	Goals	Zaitsev 4	Al-Sadd Aquatic Centre, Doha; Referees: Vuletić (CRO), Brguljan (MNE)

8 December; 18:30	Philippines	0–5	Qatar	Al-Sadd Aquatic Centre, Doha
8 December; 18:30	Walkover			Al-Sadd Aquatic Centre, Doha

9 December; 10:00	Qatar	5–31	South Korea	Al-Sadd Aquatic Centre, Doha; Referees: Kazuhito (JPN), Fung (HKG)
9 December; 10:00	Score by quarters: 0–7, 0–4, 0–11, 5–9			Al-Sadd Aquatic Centre, Doha; Referees: Kazuhito (JPN), Fung (HKG)
9 December; 10:00	Hamad 2	Goals	Lee S., Kim W. 6	Al-Sadd Aquatic Centre, Doha; Referees: Kazuhito (JPN), Fung (HKG)

9 December; 11:30	Iran	5–0	Philippines	Al-Sadd Aquatic Centre, Doha
9 December; 11:30	Walkover			Al-Sadd Aquatic Centre, Doha

10 December; 17:00	South Korea	9–14	Iran	Al-Sadd Aquatic Centre, Doha; Referees: Margeta (SLO), Vuletić (CRO)
10 December; 17:00	Score by quarters: 3–3, 1–4, 3–4, 2–3			Al-Sadd Aquatic Centre, Doha; Referees: Margeta (SLO), Vuletić (CRO)
10 December; 17:00	Baek, Park B. 3	Goals	Mirmehdi 4	Al-Sadd Aquatic Centre, Doha; Referees: Margeta (SLO), Vuletić (CRO)

10 December; 18:30	Qatar	4–18	Kazakhstan	Al-Sadd Aquatic Centre, Doha; Referees: Al-Sheaifi (KSA), Ni (CHN)
10 December; 18:30	Score by quarters: 0–6, 1–5, 1–2, 2–5			Al-Sadd Aquatic Centre, Doha; Referees: Al-Sheaifi (KSA), Ni (CHN)
10 December; 18:30	Hamad 3	Goals	Medvedev 4	Al-Sadd Aquatic Centre, Doha; Referees: Al-Sheaifi (KSA), Ni (CHN)

==== Group B ====
Pos	Team	Pld	W	D	L	GF	GA	GD	Pts	Qualification
1	China	4	4	0	0	59	25	+34	8	Semifinals
2	Japan	4	3	0	1	88	34	+54	6	Semifinals
3	Uzbekistan	4	2	0	2	43	44	−1	4	Classification 5th–8th
4	Saudi Arabia	4	1	0	3	31	53	−22	2	Classification 5th–8th
5	Hong Kong	4	0	0	4	21	86	−65	0	

Source: Results

6 December; 10:00	Hong Kong	9–19	Saudi Arabia	Al-Sadd Aquatic Centre, Doha; Referees: Stampalija (CRO), Balfanbayev (KAZ)
6 December; 10:00	Score by quarters: 1–4, 2–8, 3–3, 3–4			Al-Sadd Aquatic Centre, Doha; Referees: Stampalija (CRO), Balfanbayev (KAZ)
6 December; 10:00	H. Wong 3	Goals	B. Al-Harbi 6	Al-Sadd Aquatic Centre, Doha; Referees: Stampalija (CRO), Balfanbayev (KAZ)

6 December; 11:30	China	12–6	Uzbekistan	Al-Sadd Aquatic Centre, Doha; Referees: Margeta (SLO), Vuletić (CRO)
6 December; 11:30	Score by quarters: 2–1, 5–3, 4–1, 1–1			Al-Sadd Aquatic Centre, Doha; Referees: Margeta (SLO), Vuletić (CRO)
6 December; 11:30	Han 4	Goals	Kovyazin 3	Al-Sadd Aquatic Centre, Doha; Referees: Margeta (SLO), Vuletić (CRO)

7 December; 17:00	Uzbekistan	14–5	Hong Kong	Al-Sadd Aquatic Centre, Doha; Referees: Hafezi (IRI), Balfanbayev (KAZ)
7 December; 17:00	Score by quarters: 5–0, 5–0, 1–1, 3–4			Al-Sadd Aquatic Centre, Doha; Referees: Hafezi (IRI), Balfanbayev (KAZ)
7 December; 17:00	Kovyazin 4	Goals	H. Wong 3	Al-Sadd Aquatic Centre, Doha; Referees: Hafezi (IRI), Balfanbayev (KAZ)

7 December; 18:30	Japan	13–16	China	Al-Sadd Aquatic Centre, Doha; Referees: Brguljan (MNE), Margeta (SLO)
7 December; 18:30	Score by quarters: 2–5, 4–4, 4–3, 3–4			Al-Sadd Aquatic Centre, Doha; Referees: Brguljan (MNE), Margeta (SLO)
7 December; 18:30	Shiota 4	Goals	Tan, Li J., Han 3	Al-Sadd Aquatic Centre, Doha; Referees: Brguljan (MNE), Margeta (SLO)

8 December; 10:00	Saudi Arabia	4–14	Uzbekistan	Al-Sadd Aquatic Centre, Doha; Referees: Margeta (SLO), Stampalija (CRO)
8 December; 10:00	Score by quarters: 0–5, 1–4, 1–3, 2–2			Al-Sadd Aquatic Centre, Doha; Referees: Margeta (SLO), Stampalija (CRO)
8 December; 10:00	four players 1	Goals	Yashnov 4	Al-Sadd Aquatic Centre, Doha; Referees: Margeta (SLO), Stampalija (CRO)

8 December; 11:30	Hong Kong	3–36	Japan	Al-Sadd Aquatic Centre, Doha; Referees: Hafezi (IRI), Balfanbayev (KAZ)
8 December; 11:30	Score by quarters: 1–9, 2–7, 0–9, 0–11			Al-Sadd Aquatic Centre, Doha; Referees: Hafezi (IRI), Balfanbayev (KAZ)
8 December; 11:30	H. Wong, Ku, Chung 1	Goals	Aoyagi 7	Al-Sadd Aquatic Centre, Doha; Referees: Hafezi (IRI), Balfanbayev (KAZ)

9 December; 17:00	Japan	16–6	Saudi Arabia	Al-Sadd Aquatic Centre, Doha; Referees: Balfanbayev (KAZ), Vuletić (CRO)
9 December; 17:00	Score by quarters: 3–1, 5–2, 2–2, 6–1			Al-Sadd Aquatic Centre, Doha; Referees: Balfanbayev (KAZ), Vuletić (CRO)
9 December; 17:00	Tanaka, Naganuma 3	Goals	B. Al-Harbi 3	Al-Sadd Aquatic Centre, Doha; Referees: Balfanbayev (KAZ), Vuletić (CRO)

9 December; 18:30	China	17–4	Hong Kong	Al-Sadd Aquatic Centre, Doha; Referees: Hafezi (IRI), Kurbanbaev (UZB)
9 December; 18:30	Score by quarters: 4–1, 6–2, 2–0, 5–1			Al-Sadd Aquatic Centre, Doha; Referees: Hafezi (IRI), Kurbanbaev (UZB)
9 December; 18:30	Liu 8	Goals	four players 1	Al-Sadd Aquatic Centre, Doha; Referees: Hafezi (IRI), Kurbanbaev (UZB)

10 December; 10:00	Saudi Arabia	2–14	China	Al-Sadd Aquatic Centre, Doha; Referees: Kurbanbaev (UZB), Kazuhito (JPN)
10 December; 10:00	Score by quarters: 4–1, 6–2, 2–0, 5–1			Al-Sadd Aquatic Centre, Doha; Referees: Kurbanbaev (UZB), Kazuhito (JPN)
10 December; 10:00	Al-Ghamdi, A. Al-Malki 1	Goals	Liu 4	Al-Sadd Aquatic Centre, Doha; Referees: Kurbanbaev (UZB), Kazuhito (JPN)

10 December; 11:30	Japan	23–9	Uzbekistan	Al-Sadd Aquatic Centre, Doha; Referees: Brguljan (MNE), Stampalija (CRO)
10 December; 11:30	Score by quarters: 3–3, 8–2, 5–2, 7–2			Al-Sadd Aquatic Centre, Doha; Referees: Brguljan (MNE), Stampalija (CRO)
10 December; 11:30	Shiota 5	Goals	Mormul 4	Al-Sadd Aquatic Centre, Doha; Referees: Brguljan (MNE), Stampalija (CRO)

=== Final 9th–10th ===
12 December; 10:00	Philippines	0–5	Hong Kong	Al-Sadd Aquatic Centre, Doha
12 December; 10:00	Walkover			Al-Sadd Aquatic Centre, Doha

=== Classification 5th–8th ===
Classification 5th–8th
12 December
Qatar	2
Uzbekistan	13
12 December
Saudi Arabia	14
South Korea	11

Final 5th–6th
13 December
Uzbekistan	14
Saudi Arabia	11
Final 7th–8th
13 December
Qatar	13
South Korea	22

==== Semifinals ====
12 December; 11:30	Qatar	2–13	Uzbekistan	Al-Sadd Aquatic Centre, Doha; Referees: Fung (HKG), Ni (CHN)
12 December; 11:30	Score by quarters: 0–7, 0–1, 2–2, 0–3			Al-Sadd Aquatic Centre, Doha; Referees: Fung (HKG), Ni (CHN)
12 December; 11:30	Hamad, A. Al-Shahrani 1	Goals	Valishev 5	Al-Sadd Aquatic Centre, Doha; Referees: Fung (HKG), Ni (CHN)

12 December; 17:00	Saudi Arabia	14–11	South Korea	Al-Sadd Aquatic Centre, Doha; Referees: Balfanbayev (KAZ), Hafezi (IRI)
12 December; 17:00	Score by quarters: 5–2, 3–2, 2–4, 4–3			Al-Sadd Aquatic Centre, Doha; Referees: Balfanbayev (KAZ), Hafezi (IRI)
12 December; 17:00	Al-Ghamdi 4	Goals	Kim H. 4	Al-Sadd Aquatic Centre, Doha; Referees: Balfanbayev (KAZ), Hafezi (IRI)

==== Final 7th–8th ====
13 December; 17:00	Qatar	13–22	South Korea	Al-Sadd Aquatic Centre, Doha; Referees: Kurbanbaev (UZB), Kazuhito (JPN)
13 December; 17:00	Score by quarters: 4–7, 4–5, 2–5, 3–5			Al-Sadd Aquatic Centre, Doha; Referees: Kurbanbaev (UZB), Kazuhito (JPN)
13 December; 17:00	A. Al-Shahrani 4	Goals	Park B. 6	Al-Sadd Aquatic Centre, Doha; Referees: Kurbanbaev (UZB), Kazuhito (JPN)

==== Final 5th–6th ====
13 December; 18:30	Uzbekistan	14–11	Saudi Arabia	Al-Sadd Aquatic Centre, Doha; Referees: Ni (CHN), Hafezi (IRI)
13 December; 18:30	Score by quarters: 5–4, 2–2, 5–3, 2–2			Al-Sadd Aquatic Centre, Doha; Referees: Ni (CHN), Hafezi (IRI)
13 December; 18:30	Spiridonov 5	Goals	K. Al-Harbi, Al-Ghamdi 3	Al-Sadd Aquatic Centre, Doha; Referees: Ni (CHN), Hafezi (IRI)

=== Final round ===
Semifinals
12 December
Iran	7
China	12
12 December
Japan (p)	5 (5)
Kazakhstan	5 (4)

Gold medal match
14 December
China	9
Japan	8
Bronze medal match
14 December
Iran	8
Kazakhstan	12

==== Semifinals ====
12 December; 18:30	Iran	7–12	China	Al-Sadd Aquatic Centre, Doha; Referees: Brguljan (MNE), Stampalija (CRO)
12 December; 18:30	Score by quarters: 0–2, 1–4, 2–3, 4–3			Al-Sadd Aquatic Centre, Doha; Referees: Brguljan (MNE), Stampalija (CRO)
12 December; 18:30	Mouchehkiani 3	Goals	Li B. 3	Al-Sadd Aquatic Centre, Doha; Referees: Brguljan (MNE), Stampalija (CRO)

12 December; 20:00	Japan	10–9 (OT, PSO)	Kazakhstan	Al-Sadd Aquatic Centre, Doha; Referees: Vuletić (CRO), Margeta (SLO)
12 December; 20:00	Score by quarters: 2–2, 1–0, 2–2, 0–1 OT: 0–0, 0–0 PSO: 5–4			Al-Sadd Aquatic Centre, Doha; Referees: Vuletić (CRO), Margeta (SLO)
12 December; 20:00	Aoyagi 4	Goals	Gorovoy, Medvedev, Manafov 2	Al-Sadd Aquatic Centre, Doha; Referees: Vuletić (CRO), Margeta (SLO)

==== Bronze medal match ====
14 December; 17:00	Iran	8–12	Kazakhstan	Al-Sadd Aquatic Centre, Doha; Referees: Margeta (SLO), Vuletić (CRO)
14 December; 17:00	Score by quarters: 3–4, 0–2, 2–3, 3–3			Al-Sadd Aquatic Centre, Doha; Referees: Margeta (SLO), Vuletić (CRO)
14 December; 17:00	Rezvani 3	Goals	R. Orazalinov, Zaitsev 3	Al-Sadd Aquatic Centre, Doha; Referees: Margeta (SLO), Vuletić (CRO)

==== Gold medal match ====
14 December; 18:30	China	9–8	Japan	Al-Sadd Aquatic Centre, Doha; Referees: Brguljan (MNE), Stampalija (CRO)
14 December; 18:30	Score by quarters: 0–3, 3–2, 5–3, 1–0			Al-Sadd Aquatic Centre, Doha; Referees: Brguljan (MNE), Stampalija (CRO)
14 December; 18:30	Li B. 3	Goals	Aoyagi 2	Al-Sadd Aquatic Centre, Doha; Referees: Brguljan (MNE), Stampalija (CRO)

== Final standing ==
Rank	Team	Pld	W	D	L
1st place, gold medalist(s)	China	6	6	0	0
2nd place, silver medalist(s)	Japan	6	4	0	2
3rd place, bronze medalist(s)	Kazakhstan	6	4	1	1
4	Iran	6	3	1	2
5	Uzbekistan	6	4	0	2
6	Saudi Arabia	6	2	0	4
7	South Korea	6	3	0	3
8	Qatar	6	1	0	5
9	Hong Kong	5	1	0	4
10	Philippines	5	0	0	5
