= Zhang Cong (water polo) =

Chinese water polo player (born 1990)

Personal information
- Born: 3 May 1990 (age 36) Tangshan, Hebei, China
- Height: 176 cm (5 ft 9 in)
- Weight: 65 kg (143 lb)

Sport
- Sport: water polo
Medal record
Representing China
Asian Games
Gold medal – first place	2014 Incheon	Team competition
Gold medal – first place	2018 Jakarta	Team competition
- Updated on 19 August 2015

Zhang Cong (born 3 May 1990) is a water polo player of China.

She was part of the Chinese team at the 2015 World Aquatics Championships, and the 2016 Summer Olympics.

== See also ==
- China at the 2015 World Aquatics Championships
