= Rikako =

- Gender: Female

Origin
- Origin: Japanese
- Meaning: Different meanings depending on the kanji used

Rikako (written 里花子, 莉佳子, 梨香子, 理香子, 里歌子, 璃花子 or 立花子) is a feminine Japanese given name. Notable people with the name include:

- Rikako Aida (逢田 梨香子; born 1992), Japanese voice actress
- Rikako Aikawa (愛河 里花子; born 1967), Japanese actress and voice actress
- Rikako Ikee (池江 璃花子; born 2000), Japanese swimmer
- Rikako Kobayashi (小林 里歌子; born 1997), Japanese women's footballer
- Rikako Miura (born 1989), Japanese water polo player
- Rikako Morita (森田 理香子; born 1990), Japanese golfer
- Rikako Sakata (坂田 梨香子; born 1993), Japanese model and actress
- Rikako Sasaki (佐々木 莉佳子; born 2001), Japanese idol, singer and actress
- Rikako Yamaguchi (山口 立花子; born 1988), Japanese voice actress
- Rikako Yagi (八木莉可子; born 2001), Japanese model and actress
- Rikako Yuasa (湯浅 麗歌子; born 1991), Japanese grappler
