= Kadono =

Kadono (written: 角野 or 上遠野) is a Japanese surname. Notable people with the surname include:

- Eiko Kadono (角野 栄子, born 1935), Japanese writer
- Kadono Takuzo, Japanese actor who appeared in Summer Snow
- Kōhei Kadono (上遠野 浩平, born 1968), Japanese writer
- Yuki Kadono (角野 友基, born 1996), Japanese snowboarder
- Yuki Kadono (water polo) (角野 友紀, born 1990), Japanese water polo player
