= Zhang Weiwei (water polo) =

Chinese water polo player (born 1990)

Personal information
- Born: 7 October 1990 (age 35) Chengdu, Sichuan, China
- Height: 182 cm (6 ft 0 in)
- Weight: 63 kg (139 lb)

Sport
- Sport: water polo
Medal record
Representing China
Asian Games
| Gold medal – first place | 2010 Guangzhou | Team competition |
- Updated on 19 August 2015

Zhang Weiwei (born 7 October 1990) is a water polo player of China.

She was part of the Chinese team at the 2015 World Aquatics Championships, and the 2016 Summer Olympics.

== See also ==
- China at the 2015 World Aquatics Championships
