= Madikhan Makhmetov =

Kazakhstani water polo player

Personal information
- Native name: Мадихан Сабыржанович Махметов
- Full name: Madikhan Sabyrzhanovich Makhmetov
- Nationality: Kazakhstani
- Born: 3 March 1993 (age 33) Almaty, Kazakhstan

Sport
- Country: Kazakhstan
- Sport: Water polo
Medal record
Representing Kazakhstan
Asian Games
Gold medal – first place	2014 Incheon	Team competition
Asian Aquatics Championships
Silver medal – second place	2012 Dubai	Team competition
Silver medal – second place	2016 Tokyo	Team competition

Madikhan Makhmetov (Мадихан Сабыржанович Махметов, born 3 March 1993) is a Kazakhstani water polo player. He competed in the men's tournament at the 2020 Summer Olympics.
