= Wu Zhiyu =

Chinese water polo player

Personal information
- Born: 9 September 1983 (age 42) Shanghai, China
Medal record
Men's water polo
Representing China
Asian Games
Gold medal – first place	2006 Doha	Team competition

Wu Zhiyu (born 9 September 1983 in Shanghai) is a Chinese water polo player who was a member of the gold medal-winning team at the 2006 Asian Games. Wu also competed in the 2008 Summer Olympics.
