= Roman Pilipenko =

Kazakhstani water polo player

Personal information
- Native name: Роман Игоревич Пилипенко
- Full name: Roman Igorevich Pilipenko
- Born: 24 December 1987 (age 38) Alma-Ata, Kazakh SSR, Soviet Union
- Height: 187 cm (6 ft 2 in)
- Weight: 96 kg (212 lb)

Sport
- Country: Kazakhstan
- Sport: Water polo
Medal record
Representing Kazakhstan
Asian Games
Gold medal – first place	2010 Guangzhou	Team competition
Gold medal – first place	2014 Incheon	Team competition
Gold medal – first place	2018 Jakarta	Team competition
Asian Beach Games
Gold medal – first place	2016 Da Nang	Team competition
Asian Aquatics Championships
Silver medal – second place	2016 Tokyo	Team competition

Roman Pilipenko (Роман Игоревич Пилипенко, born 24 December 1987), also written as Roman Pinipenko, is a water polo player of Kazakhstan. He was part of the Kazakhstani team winning the gold medal at the 2010 Asian Games. He was also part of the team at world championships, including at the 2009, 2011, 2013 and 2015 World Aquatics Championships.
