= Sergey Gorovoy =

Kazakhstani water polo player

Personal information
- Born: 1975 (age 50–51) Shymkent, Soviet Union

Sport
- Sport: Water polo
Medal record
Representing Kazakhstan
Asian Games
Gold medal – first place	2002 Busan	Team competition
Bronze medal – third place	2006 Doha	Team competition

Sergey Gorovoy (born 1975) is a Kazakhstani water polo player from Shymkent. At the 2012 Summer Olympics, he competed for the Kazakhstan men's national water polo team in the men's event. He is 6 ft 4 inches tall.
