= Rikako Miura =

Japanese water polo player

Personal information
- Nationality: Japan
- Born: October 13, 1989 (age 37) Yamagata, Japan

Sport
- Sport: Water polo
Medal record
Representing Japan
Asian Games
Silver medal – second place	2014 Incheon	Team competition

Rikako Miura (三浦里佳子, Miura Rikako; born 13 October 1989) is a Japanese water polo player. She competed in the 2020 Summer Olympics.
