= Rustam Ukumanov =

Kazakhstani water polo player

Personal information
- Native name: Рустам Маратович Укуманов
- Full name: Rustam Maratovich Ukumanov
- Born: 22 March 1986 (age 40) Alma-Ata, Soviet Union
- Height: 192 cm (6 ft 4 in)
- Weight: 86 kg (190 lb)

Sport
- Country: Kazakhstan
- Sport: Water polo
Medal record
Men's water polo
Representing Kazakhstan
Asian Games
Gold medal – first place	2010 Guangzhou	Team
Gold medal – first place	2014 Incheon	Team
Gold medal – first place	2018 Jakarta	Team
Silver medal – second place	2026 Aichi–Nagoya	Team
Bronze medal – third place	2006 Doha	Team
Bronze medal – third place	2022 Hangzhou	Team
Asian Beach Games
Gold medal – first place	2008 Bali	Team
Gold medal – first place	2010 Muscat	Team
Gold medal – first place	2016 Da Nang	Team
Asian Aquatics Championships
Silver medal – second place	2012 Dubai	Team
Silver medal – second place	2016 Tokyo	Team
Islamic Solidarity Games
Silver medal – second place	2005 Mecca	Team

Rustam Ukumanov (Рустам Укуманов, born 22 March 1986) is a Kazakhstani water polo player. At the 2012 Summer Olympics, he competed for the Kazakhstan men's national water polo team in the men's event. He is 6 feet 4 inches (1.93 m) tall and was born in Alma-Ata.

Ukumanov also represented Kazakhstan at the 2020 Summer Olympics.
