= Alexey Shmider =

Kazakhstani water polo player

Personal information
- Native name: Алексей Анатольевич Шмидер
- Full name: Aleksey Anatolyevich Shmider
- Born: 19 March 1990 (age 36) Alma-Ata, Soviet Union
- Height: 183 cm (6 ft 0 in)
- Weight: 80 kg (176 lb)

Sport
- Country: Kazakhstan
- Sport: Water polo
Medal record
Men's water polo
Representing Kazakhstan
Asian Games
Gold medal – first place	2014 Incheon	Team
Gold medal – first place	2018 Jakarta	Team
Silver medal – second place	2026 Aichi–Nagoya	Team
Bronze medal – third place	2022 Hangzhou	Team
Asian Beach Games
Gold medal – first place	2010 Muscat	Team
Asian Aquatics Championships
Silver medal – second place	2012 Dubai	Team
Silver medal – second place	2016 Tokyo	Team
Bronze medal – third place	2025 Ahmedabad	Team

Alexey Shmider (Алексей Шмидер, born 19 March 1990) is a Kazakhstani water polo player. At the 2012 Summer Olympics, he competed for the Kazakhstan men's national water polo team in the men's event.

Shmider also represented Kazakhstan at the 2020 Summer Olympics.
