= Alexandr Gaidukov (water polo) =

Russian-Kazakhstani water polo player

Personal information
- Born: 10 January 1974 (age 52) Volgograd, Soviet Union
- Height: 1.84 m (6 ft 0 in)
- Weight: 90 kg (198 lb)

Sport
- Country: Kazakhstan
- Sport: Water polo
Medal record
Asian Games
Gold medal – first place	2002 Busan	Team
Gold medal – first place	2010 Guanzhou	Team
Bronze medal – third place	2006 Doha	Team

Alexandr Vladimirovich Gaidukov (Russian: Александр Владимирович Гайдуков; born 10 January 1974) is a Russia-Kazakhstani water polo player. At the 2004 Summer Olympics, he competed for the Kazakhstan men's national water polo team in the men's event.

== Doping allegations ==
In 2005, a doping test proved positive. Gaidukov was banned for 12 months.
