= Li Jun (water polo) =

Chinese water polo player

Personal information
- Born: 18 October 1980 (age 45) Hunan, China
Medal record
Men's water polo
Representing China
Asian Games
Gold medal – first place	2006 Doha	Team competition
Bronze medal – third place	2002 Busan	Team competition

Li Jun (Chinese: 李俊; pinyin: Lǐ Jùn; born 18 October 1980 in Hunan) is a male Chinese water polo player who was part of the gold medal winning team at the 2006 Asian Games. He competed at the 2008 Summer Olympics.
