= Katsuyuki Tanamura =

Japanese water polo player

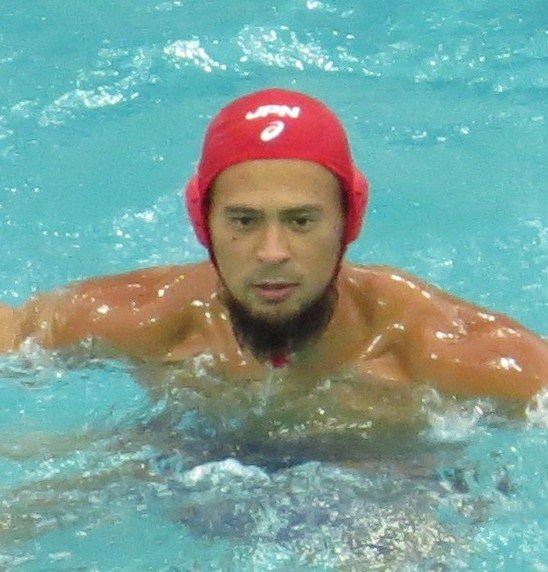

Personal information
- Born: 3 August 1989 (age 37)
- Height: 184 cm (6 ft 0 in)
- Weight: 84 kg (185 lb)

Sport
- Sport: Water polo
- Club: Bourbon WP Club
Medal record
Representing Japan
Asian Games
Gold medal – first place	2022 Hangzhou	team
Silver medal – second place	2014 Incheon	team
Silver medal – second place	2018 Jakarta	team
Bronze medal – third place	2010 Guangzhou	team

Katsuyuki Tanamura (棚村 克行, Tanamura Katsuyuki; born 3 August 1989) is a water polo player from Japan. He was part of the Japanese team at the 2016 Summer Olympics, where the team was eliminated in the group stage. He also participated in the 2020 Summer Olympics.

== See also ==
- Japan men's Olympic water polo team records and statistics
- List of men's Olympic water polo tournament goalkeepers
