= Yu Lijun (water polo) =

Chinese water polo player

Personal information
- Born: 28 November 1978 (age 47) Shanghai, China
- Height: 196 cm (6 ft 5 in)
- Weight: 108 kg (238 lb)
Medal record
Men's water polo
Representing China
Asian Games
Gold medal – first place	2006 Doha	Team competition
Silver medal – second place	2010 Guangzhou	Team competition
Bronze medal – third place	1998 Bangkok	Team competition
Bronze medal – third place	2002 Busan	Team competition
Bronze medal – third place	2014 Incheon	Team competition
Asian Aquatics Championships
Gold medal – first place	2012 Dubai	Team competition
Gold medal – first place	2025 Ahmedabad	Team competition

Yu Lijun (Chinese: 余利君; pinyin: Yú Lìjūn; born 28 November 1978, in Shanghai) is a male Chinese water polo player who was part of the gold medal winning team at the 2006 Asian Games. He competed at the 2008 Summer Olympics.
