= Wang Yong (water polo) =

Chinese water polo player

Personal information
- Born: 29 January 1979 (age 47) Shanghai, China
Medal record
Men's water polo
Representing China
Asian Games
Gold medal – first place	2006 Doha	Team competition
Bronze medal – third place	2002 Busan	Team competition

Wang Yong (born 29 January 1979 in Shanghai) is a male Chinese water polo player who was part of the gold medal-winning team at the 2006 Asian Games. He competed at the 2008 Summer Olympics.
