= Mitsuaki Shiga =

Japanese water polo player

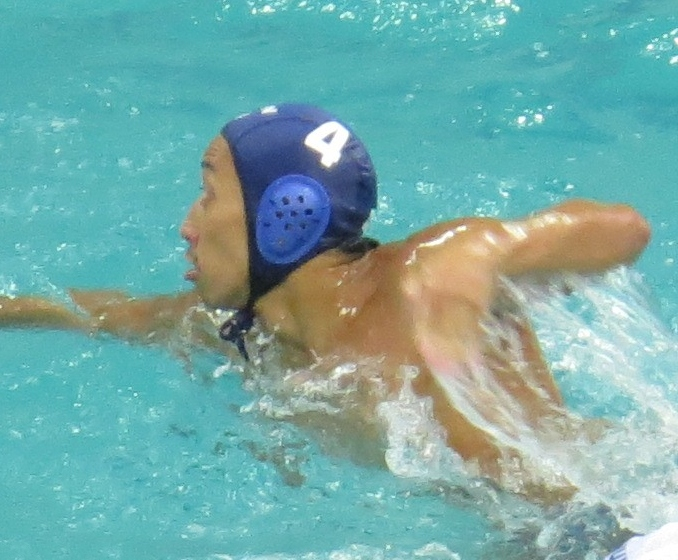

Personal information
- Born: 16 September 1991 (age 34)
- Height: 177 cm (5 ft 10 in)
- Weight: 75 kg (165 lb)

Sport
- Sport: Water polo
- Club: Kingfisher74
Medal record
Representing Japan
Asian Games
Bronze medal – third place	2010 Guangzhou	team
Silver medal – second place	2014 Incheon	team
Silver medal – second place	2018 Jakarta	team

Mitsuaki Shiga (志賀 光明, Shiga Mitsuaki; born 16 September 1991) is a water polo player from Japan. He was part of the Japanese team at the 2016 Summer Olympics, where the team was eliminated in the group stage.

== See also ==
- Japan men's Olympic water polo team records and statistics
