= Yuki Kadono (water polo) =

Japanese water polo player

Personal information
- Born: 14 September 1990 (age 35)
- Height: 177 cm (5 ft 10 in)
- Weight: 72 kg (159 lb)

Sport
- Sport: Water polo
- Club: All-Nittaidai
Medal record
Representing Japan
Asian Games
Silver medal – second place	2014 Incheon	team

Yuki Kadono (角野 友紀; Kadono Yūki) born 14 September 1990 is a water polo player from Japan. He was part of the Japanese team at the 2016 Summer Olympics, where the team was eliminated in the group stage.
