= Boris Margeta =

Slovenian water polo referee

- Born: September 19, 1972 (age 54); Kranj , Slovenia
- Years active: since 2000
- Known for: Water polo refereeing

Boris Margeta (Kranj, Slovenia, 19 September 1972) is a Slovenian water polo referee, who is one of the most experienced European referees in water polo. He has been the president of the World Water Polo Referees' Association (WWR) since 2018. He has officiated water polo competitions at six Olympic Games.

== Career ==
In his first youth years, he started playing water polo for the Slovenian club Triglav. Later he quit and Matjaž Rakovec, a former international water polo referee and president of the Slovenian water polo referees' organisation, encouraged him into getting into water polo refereeing. He began refereeing in the 1990s.

He passed the Slovenian examination to become an international referee in 1997, and he eventually was invited then by FINA and officiated at his first Olympic Games in Sydney in 2000.

Margeta has officiated at six Summer Olympic Games. He was selected for the Summer Olympic Games of 2000, 2004, 2008, 2012, 2016 and 2024. In fact, he was additionally invited for the 2020 Summer Olympics, but due to a family matter, he did not take part.

Margeta has also officiated in several final games of the World Aquatics Championship, World Cup, World League, and also in European Champions League.

== Refereeing lecturing ==
Margeta has also worked in the education and training of new water polo referees by being an expert lecturer at the European Aquatics Water Polo Referees Schools and has contributed to develop the World Aquatics' education programme for water polo officials.

== Controversial ==
At the 2012 Olympics water polo tournament, in London, Margeta was involved in a highly controversial decision in the men's match between Spain and Croatia. He actually overruled a line judge, who had called as a goal a late Spanish attempt. Croatia won finally the match 8–7. Then, Spain appealed the incident to FINA, but the final match result was upheld. As an outcome, Margeta was then removed from the remaining officiating appointments of this tournament.
