= Koji Takei =

Japanese water polo player

Personal information
- Born: 30 July 1990 (age 35)
- Height: 176 cm (5 ft 9 in)
- Weight: 78 kg (172 lb)

Sport
- Sport: Water polo
- Club: All-Nittaidai
Medal record
Representing Japan
Asian Games
| Silver medal – second place | 2014 Incheon | team |
| Bronze medal – third place | 2010 Guangzhou | team |

Koji Takei (竹井昂司, born 30 July 1990) is a water polo player from Japan. He was part of the Japanese team at the 2016 Summer Olympics, where the team was eliminated in the group stage.
