= Akira Yanase =

Japanese water polo player

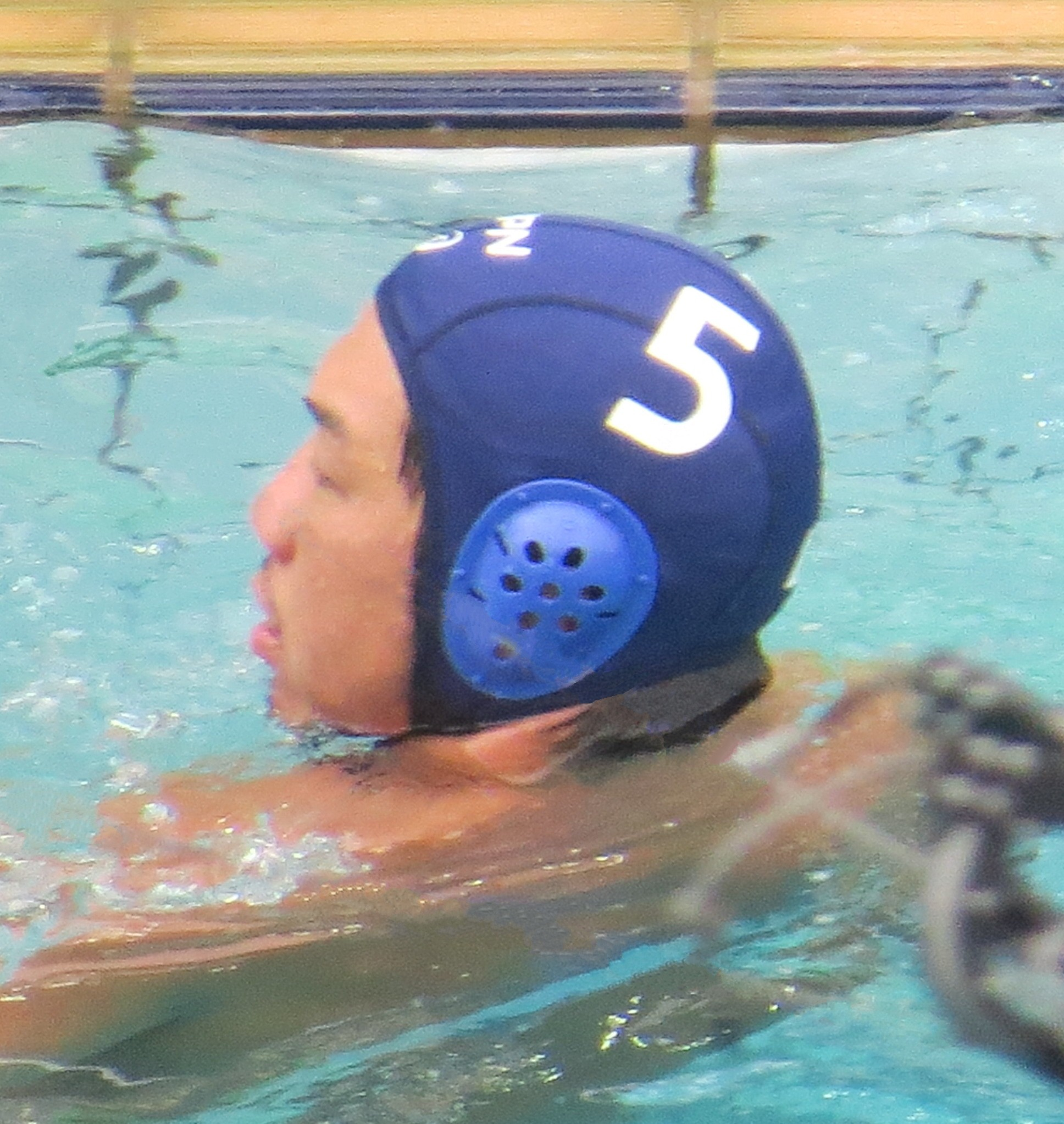
- Akira Yanase in 2016

Personal information
- Nationality: Japanese
- Born: 11 August 1988 (age 37) Gunma, Japan

Sport
- Sport: Water polo
Medal record
Representing Japan
Asian Games
Silver medal – second place	2014 Incheon	Team competition
Bronze medal – third place	2010 Guangzhou	Team competition

Akira Yanase (柳瀬 彰良, Yanase Akira; born 11 August 1988) is a Japanese water polo player. He competed in the men's tournament at the 2016 Summer Olympics.
