= Sergey Gubarev =

Kazakhstani water polo player

Personal information
- Born: 1978 (age 47–48) Bishkek, Soviet Union

Sport
- Sport: Water polo
Medal record
Representing Kazakhstan
Asian Games
Gold medal – first place	2010 Guangzhou	Team competition
Gold medal – first place	2014 Incheon	Team competition

Sergey Gubarev (born 1978) is a Kazakhstani water polo player from Frunze. At the 2012 Summer Olympics, he competed for the Kazakhstan men's national water polo team in the men's event. He is 6 ft 0 inches tall.
