= Ravil Manafov =

Kazakhstani water polo player

Personal information
- Native name: Равиль Амирович Манафов
- Full name: Ravil Amirovich Manafov
- Born: 22 June 1985 (age 41) Alma-Ata, Soviet Union
- Height: 194 cm (6 ft 4 in)
- Weight: 101 kg (223 lb)

Sport
- Country: Kazakhstan
- Sport: Water polo
Medal record
Representing Kazakhstan
Asian Games
Gold medal – first place	2010 Guangzhou	Team competition
Gold medal – first place	2018 Jakarta	Team competition
Bronze medal – third place	2006 Doha	Team competition
Asian Beach Games
Gold medal – first place	2014 Phuket	Team competition
Asian Aquatics Championships
Silver medal – second place	2012 Dubai	Team competition
Silver medal – second place	2016 Tokyo	Team competition
Islamic Solidarity Games
Silver medal – second place	2005 Mecca	Team competition

Ravil Manafov (Равиль Манафов, born 22 June 1985) is a Kazakhstani water polo player. At the 2012 Summer Olympics, he competed for the Kazakhstan men's national water polo team in the men's event. He is 6 ft 4 inches tall and was born in Alma-Ata.
