= Yusuke Shimizu =

Japanese water polo player

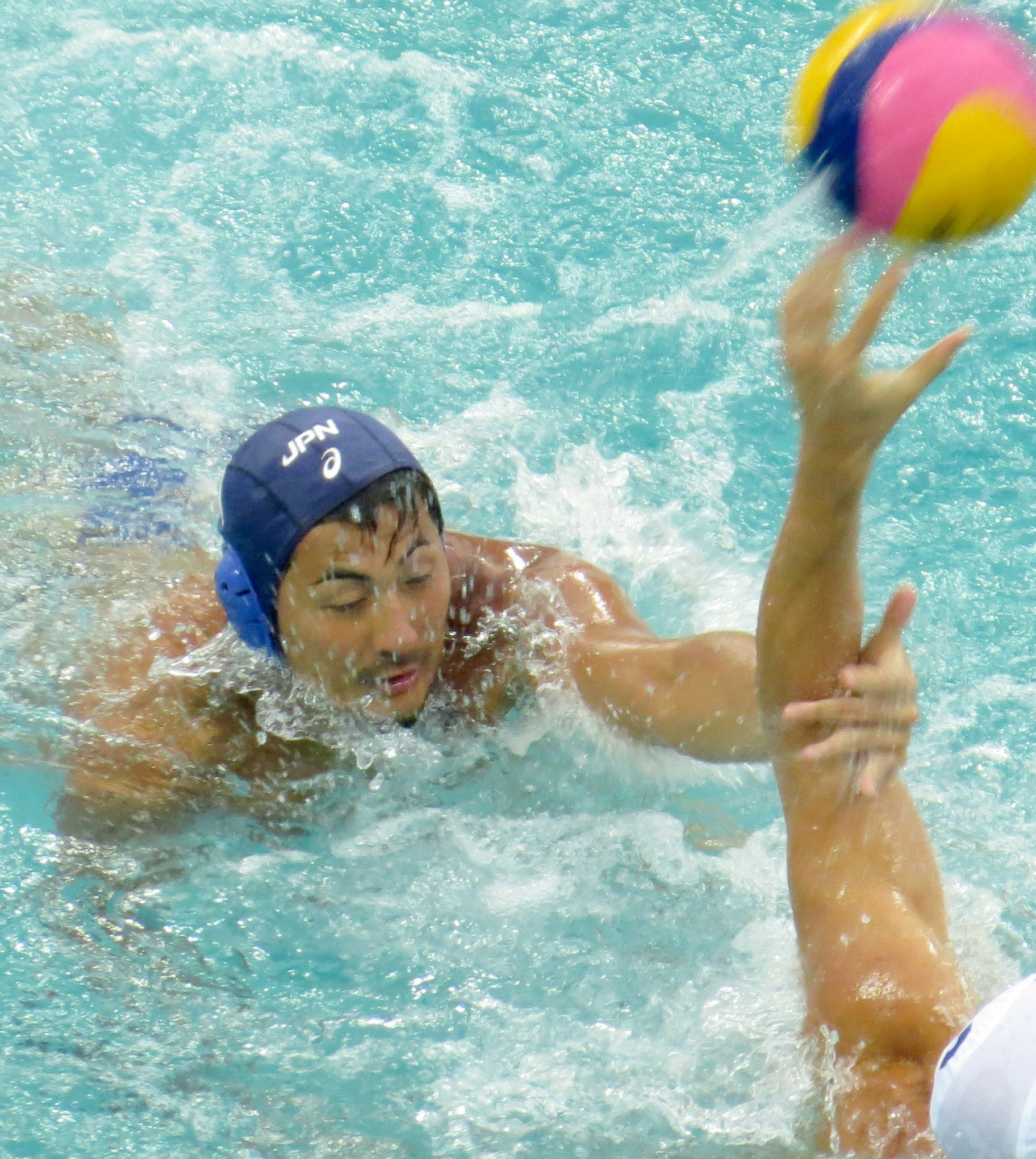

Personal information
- Born: 7 September 1988 (age 37)
- Height: 181 cm (5 ft 11 in)
- Weight: 85 kg (187 lb)

Sport
- Sport: Water polo
- Club: VK Crvena zvezda
Medal record
Representing Japan
Asian Games
| Silver medal – second place | 2014 Incheon | team |
| Bronze medal – third place | 2010 Guangzhou | team |

Yusuke Shimizu (志水 祐介, Shimizu Yūsuke; born 7 September 1988) is a water polo player from Japan. He was the captain of the Japanese team at the 2016 Summer Olympics, where the team was eliminated in the group stage.
