= Shota Hazui =

Japanese water polo player

Personal information
- Born: 30 September 1986 (age 39)
- Height: 177 cm (5 ft 10 in)
- Weight: 77 kg (170 lb)

Sport
- Sport: Water polo
- Club: Bourbon WP Club
Medal record
Representing Japan
Asian Games
Silver medal – second place	2014 Incheon	team
Bronze medal – third place	2010 Guangzhou	team

Shota Hazui (born 30 September 1986) is a water polo player from Japan. He was part of the Japanese team at the 2016 Summer Olympics, where the team was eliminated in the group stage.
