= Alexey Panfili =

Kazakhstani water polo player

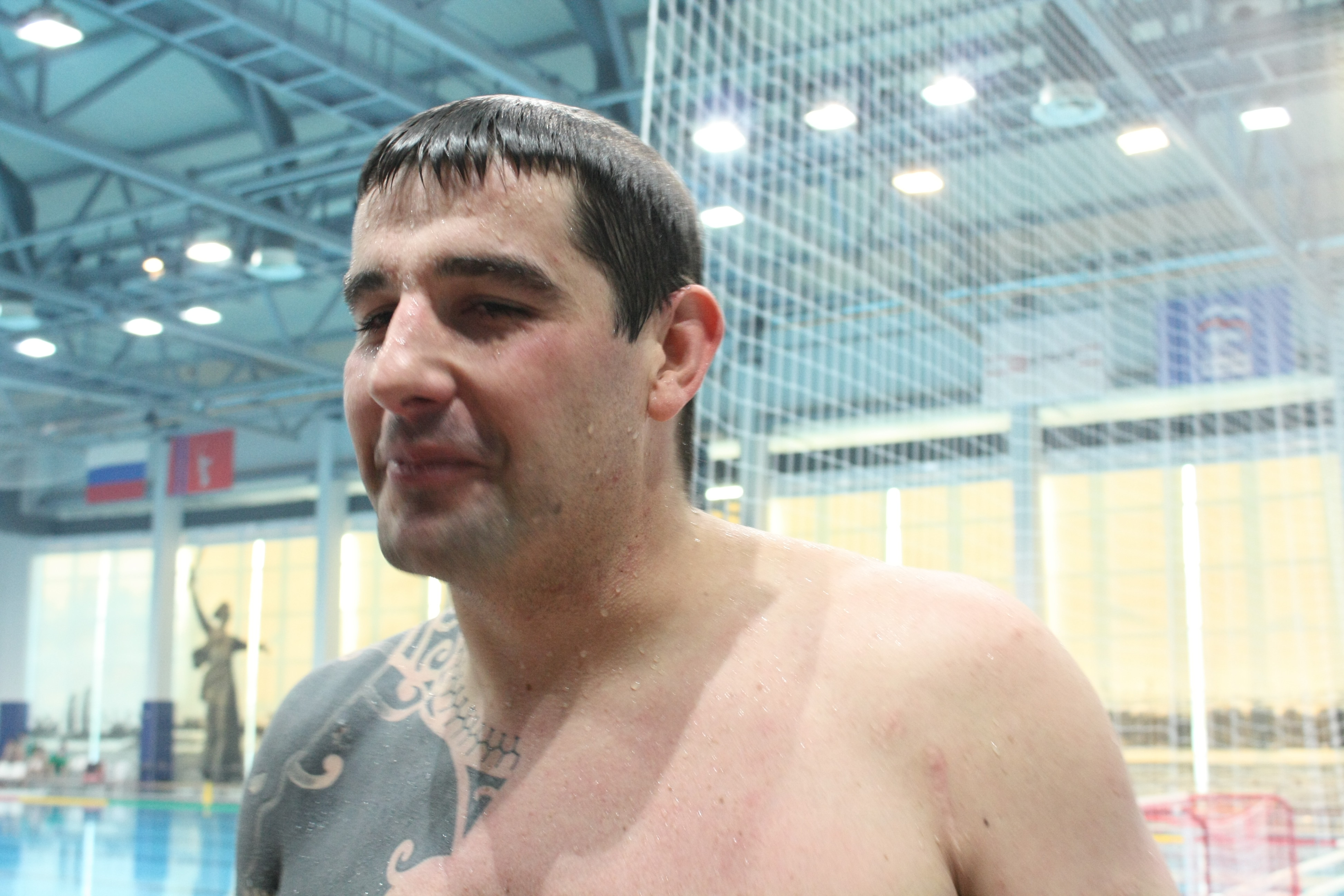

Personal information
- Born: January 5, 1974 (age 52) Bishkek, Kirghiz SSR, Soviet Union

Sport
- Sport: Water polo
Medal record
Representing Russia
World Championships
Bronze medal – third place	2001 Fukuoka	Team competition
Representing Kazakhstan
Asian Games
Gold medal – first place	2010 Guangzhou	Team competition
Gold medal – first place	2014 Incheon	Team competition

Alexey Panfili (born 5 January 1974) is a Russian-Kazakhstani former water polo player. At the 2012 Summer Olympics, he competed for the Kazakhstan men's national water polo team in the men's event. He is 6 ft 6 inches tall.

== See also ==
- List of World Aquatics Championships medalists in water polo
