= Wang Beiming =

Chinese water polo player

Personal information
- Born: August 13, 1983 (age 42) Shanghai, China

Sport
- Sport: Water polo
Medal record
Representing China
Asian Games
Silver medal – second place	2010 Guangzhou	Team competition

Wang Beiming (Chinese: 王贝铭; born 13 August 1983) is a male Chinese water polo player. He competed at the 2008 Summer Olympics.
