= Xie Junmin =

Chinese water polo player

Personal information
- Nationality: Chinese
- Born: 17 May 1983 (age 43) Guangdong, China
- Height: 1.86 m (6 ft 1 in)
- Weight: 86 kg (190 lb)

Sport
- Sport: Water polo
- Handedness: Right
- Number: 9
National team
- Years: Team
- 2006–2013: China
Medal record
Men's water polo
Representing China
Asian Games
Gold medal – first place	2006 Doha	Team competition
Silver medal – second place	2010 Guangzhou	Team competition

Xie Junmin (born 17 May 1983 in Guangdong) is a Chinese male former water polo player. He was part of the China men's national water polo team. He was part of the gold medal winning team at the 2006 Asian Games and competed at the 2008 Summer Olympics. He also competed at the 2011 World Aquatics Championships and 2013 World Aquatics Championships.
