= Han Zhidong =

Chinese water polo player

Personal information
- Born: 29 July 1977 (age 48) Guangdong, China
Medal record
Men's water polo
Representing China
Asian Games
Gold medal – first place	2006 Doha	Team competition
Silver medal – second place	2010 Guangzhou	Team competition
Bronze medal – third place	1998 Bangkok	Team competition
Bronze medal – third place	2002 Busan	Team competition

Han Zhidong (born 29 July 1977 in Guangdong) is a male Chinese water polo player who was part of the gold medal winning team at the 2006 Asian Games. He competed at the 2008 Summer Olympics. In 2010, as part of the china team, he competed in the 14th FINA Men's Water Polo World Cup, taking 11th place.

== Competition Collapse ==
At the December 2006 Asian Games, Zhidong was rushed to hospital after collapsing by the poolside during a clash his team encountered. He had just got out the water when he collapsed on a team bench and was thereafter taken to the Athletes Village Medical Centre. This incident happened with a 10-10 tie of the game.

== Coaching ==
Han Zhidong is currently a coach at Whitewaters Swimming. A private swim club that competes in USA Swimming sanctioned meets. In addition, he is also a ASCA level 2 coach.
