= Ge Weiqing =

Chinese water polo player

Personal information
- Born: 25 April 1977 (age 49) Shanghai, China
Medal record
Men's water polo
Representing China
Asian Games
Gold medal – first place	2006 Doha	Team competition
Silver medal – second place	2010 Guangzhou	Team competition
Bronze medal – third place	2002 Busan	Team competition

Ge Weiqing (born 25 April 1977) is a male Chinese water polo player who was part of the gold medal winning team at the 2006 Asian Games. He competed at the 2008 Summer Olympics.

== See also ==
- List of men's Olympic water polo tournament goalkeepers
