= Murat Shakenov =

Kazakhstani water polo player

Personal information
- Native name: Мурат Максутбекович Шакенов
- Full name: Murat Maksutbekovich Shakenov
- Born: 23 September 1990 (age 36) Alma-Ata, Kazakh SSR, Soviet Union
- Height: 183 cm (6 ft 0 in)
- Weight: 71 kg (157 lb)

Sport
- Country: Kazakhstan
- Sport: Water polo
Medal record
Men's water polo
Representing Kazakhstan
Asian Games
Gold medal – first place	2010 Guangzhou	Team
Gold medal – first place	2014 Incheon	Team
Gold medal – first place	2018 Jakarta	Team
Silver medal – second place	2026 Aichi–Nagoya	Team
Bronze medal – third place	2022 Hangzhou	Team
Asian Beach Games
Gold medal – first place	2010 Muscat	Team
Asian Aquatics Championships
Silver medal – second place	2012 Dubai	Team
Silver medal – second place	2016 Tokyo	Team
Bronze medal – third place	2025 Ahmedabad	Team

Murat Shakenov (Мурат Шакенов, born 23 September 1990) is a Kazakhstani water polo player. At the 2012 Summer Olympics, he competed for the Kazakhstan men's national water polo team in the men's event. He is 5 ft 0 inches tall.

Shakenov also re/presented Kazakhstan at the 2020 Summer Olympics.
