= Liang Zhongxing =

Chinese water polo player

Personal information
- Born: 23 December 1986 (age 39) Guangdong, China

Sport
- Sport: Water polo
Medal record
Representing China
Asian Games
Gold medal – first place	2006 Doha	Team competition
Silver medal – second place	2010 Guangzhou	Team competition
Bronze medal – third place	2014 Incheon	Team competition

Liang Zhongxing (Chinese: 梁仲兴; born 23 December 1986, in Guangdong) is a male Chinese water polo player who was part of the gold medal winning team at the 2006 Asian Games. He competed at the 2008 Summer Olympics.
