= Li Bin (water polo) =

Chinese water polo player

Personal information
- Born: 24 October 1983 (age 43) Shanghai, China

Sport
- Sport: Water polo
Medal record
Representing China
Asian Games
Gold medal – first place	2006 Doha	Team competition
Silver medal – second place	2010 Guangzhou	Team competition
Bronze medal – third place	2014 Incheon	Team competition

Li Bin (Chinese: 李斌; pinyin: Lǐ Bīn; born 24 October 1983 in Shanghai) is a male Chinese water polo player who was part of the gold medal winning team at the 2006 Asian Games. He competed at the 2008 Summer Olympics.
