= Tan Feihu =

Chinese water polo player

Personal information
- Born: 1 January 1987 (age 39) Hunan, China

Sport
- Sport: Water polo
Medal record
Representing China
Asian Games
Gold medal – first place	2006 Doha	Team competition
Silver medal – second place	2010 Guangzhou	Team competition
Silver medal – second place	2022 Hangzhou	Team competition
Bronze medal – third place	2014 Incheon	Team competition

Tan Feihu (born 1 January 1987 in Hunan) is a male Chinese water polo player who was part of the gold medal winning team at the 2006 Asian Games. He competed at the 2008 Summer Olympics.
