= Wang Yang (water polo) =

Chinese water polo player

Personal information
- Born: January 17, 1983 (age 43) Shenyang, Liaoning, China

Sport
- Sport: Water polo
Medal record
Representing China
Asian Games
Silver medal – second place	2010 Guangzhou	Team competition
Bronze medal – third place	2014 Incheon	Team competition

Wang Yang (Chinese: 王洋; pinyin: Wáng Yáng; born 17 January 1983) is a Chinese water polo player. He represented China at the 2008 Summer Olympics, where the Chinese men's team finished 12th. He won a silver medal with China at the 2010 Asian Games and a bronze medal at the 2014 Asian Games.

== Career ==
Wang finished third at the 2005 National Games.

At the 2008 Summer Olympics in Beijing, Wang competed in the men's water polo tournament for China. The team finished in 12th place.

At the 2010 Asian Games in Guangzhou, Wang was a member of the Chinese team that reached the men's water polo final. China lost the final 6–7 to Kazakhstan, giving Wang and his teammates the silver medal. He later won a bronze medal with China at the 2014 Asian Games in Incheon.
