= 2014 Men's European Water Polo Championship squads =

This article shows all participating team squads at the 2014 Men's European Water Polo Championship, held in Hungary from 14 to 27 July 2014.

== Croatia ==
No.	Name	Date of birth	Position	Height	Weight
1	Josip Pavic	15 January 1982	Goalkeeper	195 cm (6 ft 5 in)	90 kg (200 lb)
2	Luka Bukic	30 April 1994			
3	Ivan Milakovic	13 August 1980			
4	Luka Loncar	26 June 1987			
5	Maro Jokovic	1 October 1987		203 cm (6 ft 8 in)	95 kg (209 lb)
6	Ivan Buljubasic	31 October 1987		199 cm (6 ft 6 in)	118 kg (260 lb)
7	Petar Muslim	26 March 1988		200 cm (6 ft 7 in)	102 kg (225 lb)
8	Andro Buslje	4 January 1986		200 cm (6 ft 7 in)	115 kg (254 lb)
9	Sandro Sukno	30 June 1990		200 cm (6 ft 7 in)	93 kg (205 lb)
10	Niksa Dobud	5 August 1985		199 cm (6 ft 6 in)	118 kg (260 lb)
11	Andelo Setka	14 September 1985			
12	Duje Zivkovic	19 December 1990		200 cm (6 ft 7 in)	93 kg (205 lb)
13	Marko Bijac	12 January 1991	Goalkeeper		

== France ==
No.	Name	Date of birth	Position	Height	Weight
1	Remi Garsau	19 July 1984	Goalkeeper		
2	Remi Saudadier	20 March 1986			
3	Arnaud Jablonski	13 November 1984			
4	Enzo Khasz	13 August 1993			
5	Romain Blary	20 October 1985			
6	Thibaut Simon	18 December 1983			
7	Mathieu Peisson	29 September 1982			
8	Manuel Laversanne	10 May 1987			
9	Mehdi Marzouki	26 May 1987			
10	Mickael Bodegas	3 May 1987			
11	Petar Tomasevic	2 January 1989			
12	Alexandre Camarasa	10 June 1987			
13	Jonathan Moriame	19 June 1984	Goalkeeper		

== Georgia ==
No.	Name	Date of birth	Position	Height	Weight
1	Zurab Chumburidze	8 March 1986	Goalkeeper		
2	Beka Kavtaradze	9 July 1990			
3	Damir Tsrepulia	16 January 1984			
4	Marko Elez	9 September 1980			
5	Alexander Rusishvili	25 February 1991			
6	Marko Jelaca	15 December 1982			
7	George Khvedeliani	13 April 1988			
8	Mikheil Baghaturia	9 May 1987			
9	Zurab Rurua	8 June 1987			
10	Konstantin Gegelashvili	7 May 1983			
11	Tato Nikoleishvili	15 August 1986			
12	Marino Franicevic	24 December 1982			
13	Beka Kapanadze	28 July 1993	Goalkeeper		

== Germany ==
No.	Name	Date of birth	Position	Height	Weight
1	Roger Sen-Wei Kong	22 September 1984	Goalkeeper		
2	Erik Bukowski	18 November 1986			
3	Timo Van Der Bosch	29 November 1993			
4	Julian Real	22 December 1989			
5	Jan Obschernikat	15 December 1992			
6	Maurice Juengling	6 October 1991			
7	Heiko Nossek	14 March 1982			
8	Paul Schueler	14 June 1987			
9	Marko Stamm	30 August 1988			
10	Moritz Oeler	21 October 1985			
11	Andreas Schlotterbeck	2 March 1982			
12	Dennis Eidner	4 August 1989			
13	Moritz Schenkel	4 September 1990	Goalkeeper		

== Greece ==
No.	Name	Date of birth	Position	Height	Weight
1	Konstantinos Tsalkanis	23 April 1982	Goalkeeper		
2	Emmanouil Mylonakis	9 April 1985		185 cm (6 ft 1 in)	75 kg (165 lb)
3	Georgios Dervisis	30 October 1994			
4	Dimitrios Tigkas	1 April 1993		190 cm (6 ft 3 in)	88 kg (194 lb)
5	Ioannis Fountoulis	25 May 1988		187 cm (6 ft 2 in)	86 kg (190 lb)
6	Kyriakos Pontikeas	9 May 1991			
7	Christos Afroudakis	23 May 1984		188 cm (6 ft 2 in)	88 kg (194 lb)
8	Evangelos Delakas	8 February 1985		190 cm (6 ft 3 in)	88 kg (194 lb)
9	Konstantinos Mourikis	11 July 1988			
10	Christodoulos Kolomvos	26 October 1988			
11	Alexandros Gounas	3 October 1989			
12	Angelos Vlachopoulos	28 September 1991			
13	Stefanos Galanopoulos	22 February 1993	Goalkeeper		

== Hungary ==
No.	Name	Date of birth	Position	Height	Weight	Club
1	Viktor Nagy	24 July 1984	Goalkeeper	198 cm (6 ft 6 in)	94 kg (207 lb)	(Hungary) Szolnok
2	Miklós Gór-Nagy	8 January 1983				(Hungary) OSC
3	Norbert Madaras	1 December 1979		191 cm (6 ft 3 in)	91 kg (201 lb)	(Hungary) Szolnok
4	Balázs Erdélyi	16 February 1990		196 cm (6 ft 5 in)	102 kg (225 lb)	(Hungary) Eger
5	Márton Vámos	24 June 1992				(Hungary) Szolnok
6	Norbert Hosnyánszky	4 March 1984		196 cm (6 ft 5 in)	102 kg (225 lb)	(Hungary) Eger
7	Ádám Decker	29 February 1984				(Hungary) OSC
8	Márton Szívós	19 August 1981		193 cm (6 ft 4 in)	95 kg (209 lb)	(Hungary) Eger
9	Dániel Varga	25 September 1983		201 cm (6 ft 7 in)	95 kg (209 lb)	(Hungary) Szolnok
10	Dénes Varga	29 March 1987		193 cm (6 ft 4 in)	95 kg (209 lb)	(Hungary) Szolnok
11	Márton Tóth	28 September 1985				(Hungary) Szolnok
12	Balázs Hárai	5 April 1987		202 cm (6 ft 8 in)	110 kg (240 lb)	(Hungary) Eger
13	Attila Decker	25 August 1987	Goalkeeper			(Hungary) Szolnok
Head coach: Tibor Benedek

== Italy ==
No.	Name	Date of birth	Position	Height	Weight
1	Stefano Tempesti	9 June 1979	Goalkeeper	205 cm (6 ft 9 in)	99 kg (218 lb)
2	Francesco Di Fulvio	15 August 1993			
3	Alessandro Velotto	12 February 1995			
4	Pietro Figlioli	29 May 1984		192 cm (6 ft 4 in)	98 kg (216 lb)
5	Alex Giorgetti	24 December 1987		187 cm (6 ft 2 in)	78 kg (172 lb)
6	Andrea Fondelli	27 February 1994		193 cm (6 ft 4 in)	93 kg (205 lb)
7	Massimo Giacoppo	10 May 1983		193 cm (6 ft 4 in)	93 kg (205 lb)
8	Valentino Gallo	17 July 1985		193 cm (6 ft 4 in)	93 kg (205 lb)
9	Niccolo' Figari	24 January 1988			
10	Stefano Luongo	5 January 1990		192 cm (6 ft 4 in)	104 kg (229 lb)
11	Matteo Aicardi	19 April 1986		192 cm (6 ft 4 in)	104 kg (229 lb)
12	Fabio Baraldi	21 March 1990		192 cm (6 ft 4 in)	104 kg (229 lb)
13	Marco Del Lungo	1 March 1990	Goalkeeper		

== Montenegro ==
No.	Name	Date of birth	Position	Height	Weight
1	Zdravko Radic	24 June 1979	Goalkeeper		
2	Drasko Brguljan	27 December 1984		194 cm (6 ft 4 in)	88 kg (194 lb)
3	Vjekoslav Paskovic	23 March 1985		181 cm (5 ft 11 in)	85 kg (187 lb)
4	Antonio Petrovic	24 September 1982		193 cm (6 ft 4 in)	95 kg (209 lb)
5	Darko Brguljan	5 November 1990			
6	Uros Cuckovic	25 April 1990		185 cm (6 ft 1 in)	89 kg (196 lb)
7	Mladan Janovic	11 June 1984		191 cm (6 ft 3 in)	94 kg (207 lb)
8	Nikola Janovic	22 March 1980		191 cm (6 ft 3 in)	100 kg (220 lb)
9	Aleksandar Ivovic	24 February 1986		197 cm (6 ft 6 in)	105 kg (231 lb)
10	Sasa Misic	27 March 1987			
11	Filip Klikovac	7 February 1989			
12	Predrag Jokic	3 February 1983		188 cm (6 ft 2 in)	96 kg (212 lb)
13	Milos Scepanovic	9 October 1982	Goalkeeper	185 cm (6 ft 1 in)	89 kg (196 lb)

== Romania ==
No.	Name	Date of birth	Position	Height	Weight
1	Dragos C. Stoenescu	30 May 1979	Goalkeeper	196 cm (6 ft 5 in)	96 kg (212 lb)
2	Cosmin A. Radu	9 November 1981			
3	Tiberiu Negrean	1 September 1988		187 cm (6 ft 2 in)	85 kg (187 lb)
4	Nicolae Diaconu	4 September 1980		180 cm (5 ft 11 in)	88 kg (194 lb)
5	Andrei Cretu	21 September 1989			
6	Dan Andrei Busila	10 November 1980		188 cm (6 ft 2 in)	85 kg (187 lb)
7	Alexandru B. Matei Guiman	31 December 1980		195 cm (6 ft 5 in)	95 kg (209 lb)
8	Mihnea Chioveanu	21 August 1987		198 cm (6 ft 6 in)	115 kg (254 lb)
9	Dimitri Goanta	17 July 1987		195 cm (6 ft 5 in)	95 kg (209 lb)
10	Minnea Gheorghe	12 October 1986			
11	Alexandru Ghiban	12 October 1986		196 cm (6 ft 5 in)	96 kg (212 lb)
12	Alex Popoviciu	2 August 1980		198 cm (6 ft 6 in)	115 kg (254 lb)
13	Mihai Dragusin	5 January 1984	Goalkeeper	188 cm (6 ft 2 in)	85 kg (187 lb)

== Russia ==
No.	Name	Date of birth	Position	Height	Weight
1	Evgeny Kostrov	7 November 1988	Goalkeeper		
2	Ivan Suchkov	15 June 1995			
3	Artem Odintsov	16 January 1988			
4	Dmitry Antipov	1 September 1984			
5	Albert Zinnatullin	27 April 1990			
6	Nikita Derevyankin	21 June 1994			
7	Vladislav Timakov	20 July 1993			
8	Ivan Nagaev	30 November 1993			
9	Konstantin Stepanyuk	16 October 1984			
10	Dmitrii Kholod	16 January 1992			
11	Nikita Yankov	27 March 1986			
12	Roman Shepelev	3 August 1993			
13	Kirill Korneev	29 September 1984	Goalkeeper		

== Serbia ==
No.	Name	Date of birth	Position	Height	Weight	Club
1	Gojko Pijetlović	7 June 1983	Goalkeeper	194 cm (6 ft 4 in)	100 kg (220 lb)	(Romania) CSM Oradea
2	Dušan Mandić	16 June 1994		190 cm (6 ft 3 in)	91 kg (201 lb)	(Serbia) Partizan
3	Živko Gocić	22 August 1982		193 cm (6 ft 4 in)	100 kg (220 lb)	(Hungary) Szolnok
4	Sava Ranđjelović	17 July 1993		194 cm (6 ft 4 in)	85 kg (187 lb)	(Serbia) Crvena zvezda
5	Miloš Ćuk	21 December 1990				(Hungary) Eger
6	Duško Pijetlović	25 April 1985		186 cm (6 ft 1 in)	96 kg (212 lb)	(Italy) Pro Recco
7	Slobodan Nikić	25 January 1983		196 cm (6 ft 5 in)	94 kg (207 lb)	(Turkey) Galatasaray
8	Milan Aleksić	13 May 1986		197 cm (6 ft 6 in)	100 kg (220 lb)	(Hungary) Szolnok
9	Nikola Dedović	25 January 1992		1.89 cm (1 in)	103 kg (227 lb)	(Serbia) Radnički Kragujevac
10	Filip Filipović	2 May 1987		197 cm (6 ft 6 in)	100 kg (220 lb)	(Italy) Pro Recco
11	Andrija Prlainović	28 April 1987		187 cm (6 ft 2 in)	94 kg (207 lb)	(Italy) Pro Recco
12	Stefan Mitrović	29 March 1988		194 cm (6 ft 4 in)	85 kg (187 lb)	(Hungary) Szolnok
13	Branislav Mitrović	30 January 1985	Goalkeeper			(Hungary) Eger
Head coach: Dejan Savić

== Spain ==
No.	Name	Date of birth	Position	Height	Weight
1	Inaki Aguilar Vicente	9 September 1983	Goalkeeper	189 cm (6 ft 2 in)	82 kg (181 lb)
2	Alberto Munarriz Egana	19 May 1994			
3	Jose Javier Bustos	24 February 1994			
4	Marc Roca Barcelo	21 January 1988		191 cm (6 ft 3 in)	87 kg (192 lb)
5	Guillermo Molina Rios	16 March 1984		194 cm (6 ft 4 in)	108 kg (238 lb)
6	Marc Minguell Alferez	14 January 1985		186 cm (6 ft 1 in)	95 kg (209 lb)
7	Balazs Marton Sziranyi	10 January 1983		196 cm (6 ft 5 in)	108 kg (238 lb)
8	Albert Espanol Lifante	29 October 1985		189 cm (6 ft 2 in)	86 kg (190 lb)
9	Marc Larumbe	30 May 1994		198 cm (6 ft 6 in)	92 kg (203 lb)
10	Francisco Fernandez Miranda	21 June 1986		196 cm (6 ft 5 in)	108 kg (238 lb)
11	Blai Mallarach Guel	21 August 1987		194 cm (6 ft 4 in)	108 kg (238 lb)
12	Javier Garcia Gadea	5 January 1984		198 cm (6 ft 6 in)	92 kg (203 lb)
13	Eduardo Lorrio Bejar	25 September 1993	Goalkeeper	186 cm (6 ft 1 in)	95 kg (209 lb)
