= Romania at the 2013 World Aquatics Championships =

- Flag of Romania
- World Aquatics code: ROU
- National federation: Federatiei Romane de Natatie si Pentatlon Modern
- Website: www.swimming.ro

in Barcelona, Spain
- Competitors: 17 in 3 sports
- Medals: Gold 0 Silver 0 Bronze 0 Total 0

World Aquatics Championships appearances
- 1973; 1975; 1978; 1982; 1986; 1991; 1994; 1998; 2001; 2003; 2005; 2007; 2009; 2011; 2013; 2015; 2017; 2019; 2022; 2023; 2024; 2025

Romania is competing at the 2013 World Aquatics Championships in Barcelona, Spain between 19 July and 4 August 2013.

== Diving ==
Romania qualified a single quota for the following diving events.

Women

Athlete	Event	Preliminaries		Semifinals		Final	
Athlete	Event	Points	Rank	Points	Rank	Points	Rank
Mara Elena Aiacoboae	10 m platform	249.40	26	did not advance			

== Swimming ==
Romanian swimmers achieved qualifying standards in the following events (up to a maximum of 2 swimmers in each event at the A-standard entry time, and 1 at the B-standard):

Men

Athlete	Event	Heat		Semifinal		Final	
Athlete	Event	Time	Rank	Time	Rank	Time	Rank
Alexandru Coci	100 m butterfly	53.34	28	did not advance			
Alexandru Coci	200 m butterfly	1:57.86	17	did not advance			
Norbert Trandafir	50 m freestyle	22.25	16 Q	21.98 NR	13	did not advance	
Norbert Trandafir	100 m freestyle	49.60	20	did not advance			
Norbert Trandafir	50 m butterfly	24.73	41	did not advance			

Women

Athlete	Event	Heat		Semifinal		Final	
Athlete	Event	Time	Rank	Time	Rank	Time	Rank
Ioana Popa	50 m breaststroke	32.96	44	did not advance			
Ioana Popa	100 m breaststroke	1:11.81	42	did not advance			
Ioana Popa	200 m breaststroke	2:34.66	32	did not advance			

== Water polo ==
=== Men's tournament ===
Team roster

- Dragoș Stoenescu
- Petru Ianc
- Tiberiu Negrean
- Nicolae Diaconu
- Daniel Teohari
- Andrei Bușilă
- Alexandru Matei
- Mihnea Chioveanu
- Dimitri Goantă
- Ramiro Georgescu
- Alexandru Ghiban
- Andrei Crețu
- Mihai Drăgușin

Group play

	Pld	W	D	L	GF	GA	GD	Pts
Italy	3	3	0	0	32	18	+14	6
Germany	3	2	0	1	26	26	0	4
Kazakhstan	3	1	0	2	21	25	−4	2
Romania	3	0	0	3	16	26	−10	0

22 July 2013; 18:50	Report	Italy	10–4	Romania	Piscines Bernat Picornell, Barcelona; Attendance: 600; Referees: Peris (CRO), Koryzna (POL)
22 July 2013; 18:50	Report	Score by quarters: 4–1, 1–1, 2–2, 2–0			Piscines Bernat Picornell, Barcelona; Attendance: 600; Referees: Peris (CRO), Koryzna (POL)
22 July 2013; 18:50	Report	Aicardi 3	Goals	four players 1	Piscines Bernat Picornell, Barcelona; Attendance: 600; Referees: Peris (CRO), Koryzna (POL)

24 July 2013; 17:30	Report	Kazakhstan	7–4	Romania	Piscines Bernat Picornell, Barcelona; Attendance: 600; Referees: Peris (CRO), Stavridis (GRE)
24 July 2013; 17:30	Report	Score by quarters: 1–0, 2–2, 4–1, 0–1			Piscines Bernat Picornell, Barcelona; Attendance: 600; Referees: Peris (CRO), Stavridis (GRE)
24 July 2013; 17:30	Report	Shmider, Medvedev 2	Goals	four players 1	Piscines Bernat Picornell, Barcelona; Attendance: 600; Referees: Peris (CRO), Stavridis (GRE)

26 July 2013; 13:30	Report	Germany	9–8	Romania	Piscines Bernat Picornell, Barcelona; Attendance: 800; Referees: Naumov (RUS), Littlejohn (GBR)
26 July 2013; 13:30	Report	Score by quarters: 4–3, 3–0, 1–2, 1–3			Piscines Bernat Picornell, Barcelona; Attendance: 800; Referees: Naumov (RUS), Littlejohn (GBR)
26 July 2013; 13:30	Report	Schüler, Eidner 3	Goals	three players 2	Piscines Bernat Picornell, Barcelona; Attendance: 800; Referees: Naumov (RUS), Littlejohn (GBR)

Round of 16

28 July 2013; 17:30	Report	Serbia	13–5	Romania	Piscines Bernat Picornell, Barcelona; Attendance: 600; Referees: Koganov (AZE), Naumov (RUS)
28 July 2013; 17:30	Report	Score by quarters: 2–1, 5–1, 3–1, 3–2			Piscines Bernat Picornell, Barcelona; Attendance: 600; Referees: Koganov (AZE), Naumov (RUS)
28 July 2013; 17:30	Report	five players 2	Goals	Diaconu 3	Piscines Bernat Picornell, Barcelona; Attendance: 600; Referees: Koganov (AZE), Naumov (RUS)
