= Water polo at the 2013 World Aquatics Championships – Men's team rosters =

These are the rosters of all participating teams at the men's water polo tournament at the 2013 World Aquatics Championships in Piscines Bernat Picornell, Barcelona, Spain from 23 July–3 August.

== Group A ==
=== Greece ===
№	Name	Pos.	Height	Weight	Date of birth	Club
1	Konstantinos Tsalkanis	GK	1.91 m (6 ft 3 in)		23 April 1982	(Greece) NO Vouliagmeni
2	Emmanouil Mylonakis	D	1.85 m (6 ft 1 in)	75 kg (165 lb)	9 April 1985	(Greece) NO Vouliagmeni
3	Konstantinos Gouvis	CB	1.87 m (6 ft 2 in)	102 kg (225 lb)	10 March 1994	(Greece) NO Vouliagmeni
4	Konstantinos Genidounias	CF	2.01 m (6 ft 7 in)		21 January 1980	(United States) USC Trojans
5	Ioannis Fountoulis	D	1.87 m (6 ft 2 in)	86 kg (190 lb)	25 May 1988	(Greece) Olympiacos Water Polo Club
6	Kyriakos Pontikeas	CB	1.90 m (6 ft 3 in)		9 May 1991	(Greece) Olympiacos Water Polo Club
7	Christos Afroudakis	D	1.88 m (6 ft 2 in)	88 kg (194 lb)	23 May 1984	(Greece) NO Vouliagmeni
8	Evagelos Delakas	CB	1.90 m (6 ft 3 in)	88 kg (194 lb)	8 February 1985	(Greece) Olympiacos Water Polo Club
9	Konstantinos Mourikis	CF	1.98 m (6 ft 6 in)	115 kg (254 lb)	11 July 1988	(Greece) Olympiacos Water Polo Club
10	Christodoulos Kolomvos	CF	1.88 m (6 ft 2 in)	80 kg (176 lb)	26 October 1988	(Greece) Olympiacos Water Polo Club
11	Alexandros Gounas	D	1.80 m (5 ft 11 in)	70 kg (154 lb)	3 October 1989	(Greece) Olympiacos Water Polo Club
12	Angelos Vlachopoulos	D	1.80 m (5 ft 11 in)	75 kg (165 lb)	28 September 1991	(Greece) Olympiacos Water Polo Club
13	Konstantinos Galanidis	GK	2.02 m (6 ft 8 in)		1 September 1990	(Greece) Olympiacos Water Polo Club

Head coach: Sakis Kechagias

=== Montenegro ===
- Zdravko Radić
- Draško Brguljan
- Vjekoslav Pasković
- Antonio Petrović
- Darko Brguljan
- Ugo Crousillat
- Mlađan Janović
- Nikola Janović
- Aleksandar Ivović
- Sasa Misić
- Filip Klikovać
- Predrag Jokić
- Miloš Šćepanović

=== Spain ===
- Iñaki Aguilar
- Ricard Alarcón
- Ruben de Lera
- Albert Español
- Pere Estrany
- Xavier García
- Daniel López
- Marc Minguell
- Guillermo Molina
- Alberto Munarriz
- Felipe Perrone
- Balázs Szirányi
- Xavier Vallès

=== New Zealand ===
- Thomas Kingsmill
- Matthew Lewis
- Stefan Curry
- Finn Lowery
- Jonathon Ross
- Andrew Sieprath
- Daniel Jackson
- Matthew Small
- Eamon Lui-Fakaotimanava
- Matthew Bryant
- Lachlan Tijsen
- Adam Pye
- Dylan Smith

== Group B ==
=== Canada ===
- Justin Boyd
- Nicolas Constantin-Bicari
- John Conway
- Devon Diggle
- Luka Gasic
- Kevin Graham
- Constantin Kudaba
- Ivan Marcisin
- Jared McElroy
- Alel Taschereau
- Robin Randall
- Scott Robinson
- Oliver Vikalo

=== Croatia ===
- Josip Pavić
- Luka Lončar
- Ivan Milaković
- Fran Paskvalin
- Maro Joković
- Luka Bukić
- Petar Muslim
- Andro Bušlje
- Sandro Sukno
- Nikša Dobud
- Anđelo Šetka
- Paulo Obradović
- Marko Bijač

=== South Africa ===
- Dwayne Flatscher
- Etienne Le Roux
- Devon Card
- Ignardus Badenhorst
- Nicholas Rodda
- Jason Kyte
- Richard Downes
- Ryan Bell
- Dean Whyte
- Pierre Le Roux
- Nicholas Molyneux
- Adam Kajee
- Donn Stewart
- Lawrence Steyn

=== United States ===
- Merrill Moses
- Janson Wigo
- Alexander Obert
- Alexander Bowen
- Matthew De Trane
- Chancellor Ramirez
- J. W. Krumpholz
- Tony Azevedo
- Shea Buckner
- Tim Hutten
- Michael Rosenthal
- John Mann
- Andrew Stevens

== Group C ==
=== Australia ===
- Joel Dennerley
- Richard Campbell
- Matthew Martin
- John Cotterill
- Nathan Power
- Jarrod Gilchrist
- Aidan Roach
- Aaron Younger
- Joel Swift
- Tyler Martin
- Rhys Howden
- William Miller
- James Clark

=== China ===
- Ge Weiqing
- Tan Feihu
- Liang Zhongxing
- Jiang Bin
- Guo Junliang
- Pan Ning
- Li Bin
- Wang Yang
- Xie Junmin
- Zhang Jian
- Zhang Chufeng
- Liang Nianxiang
- Wu Honghui

=== Hungary ===
- Attila Decker
- Viktor Nagy
- Bence Bátori
- Krisztián Bedő
- Ádám Decker
- Miklós Gór-Nagy
- Balázs Hárai
- Norbert Hosnyánszky
- Norbert Madaras
- Márton Szivós
- Dániel Varga
- Dénes Varga
- Márton Vámos
- Coach: Tibor Benedek

=== Serbia ===
- Milan Aleksić
- Miloš Ćuk
- Filip Filipović
- Živko Gocić
- Dušan Mandić
- Branislav Mitrović
- Stefan Mitrović
- Slobodan Nikić
- Duško Pijetlović
- Gojko Pijetlović
- Andrija Prlainović
- Nikola Rađen
- Vanja Udovičić

== Group D ==
=== Germany ===
- Erik Bukowski
- Dennis Eidner
- Maurice Jüngling
- Roger Kong
- Erik Miers
- Heiko Nossek
- Moritz Oeler
- Julian Real
- Till Rohe
- Moritz Schenkel
- Andreas Schlotterbeck
- Paul Schüler
- Marko Stamm

=== Italy ===
- Stefano Tempesti
- Amaurys Pérez
- Niccolò Gitto
- Pietro Figlioli
- Alex Giorgetti
- Maurizio Felugo
- Niccolò Figari
- Valentino Gallo
- Christian Presciutti
- Deni Fiorentini
- Matteo Aicardi
- Christian Napolitano
- Marco Del Lungo

=== Kazakhstan ===
- Nikolay Maksimov
- Sergey Gubarev
- Yevgeniy Medvedev
- Roman Pilipenko
- Murat Shakenov
- Alexey Shmider
- Vladimir Ushakov
- Anton Koliadenko
- Rustam Ukumanov
- Mikhail Ruday
- Ravil Manafov
- Branko Pekovich
- Valeriy Shlemov

=== Romania ===
- Dragoș Stoenescu
- Petru Ianc
- Tiberiu Negrean
- Nicolae Diaconu
- Daniel Teohari
- Andrei Bușilă
- Alexandru Matei
- Mihnea Chioveanu
- Dimitri Goantă
- Ramiro Georgescu
- Alexandru Ghiban
- Andrei Crețu
- Mihai Drăgușin

== See also ==
- Water polo at the 2013 World Aquatics Championships – Women's team rosters
