= Romania at the 2011 World Aquatics Championships =

Sporting event delegation

- Flag of Romania
- World Aquatics code: ROU
- National federation: Federatiei Romane de Natatie si Pentatlon Modern
- Website: www.swimming.ro

in Shanghai, China
- Competitors: 18 in 3 sports
- Medals: Gold 0 Silver 0 Bronze 0 Total 0

World Aquatics Championships appearances
- 1973; 1975; 1978; 1982; 1986; 1991; 1994; 1998; 2001; 2003; 2005; 2007; 2009; 2011; 2013; 2015; 2017; 2019; 2022; 2023; 2024; 2025

Romania competed at the 2011 World Aquatics Championships in Shanghai, China between July 16 and 31, 2011.

== Diving ==
Romania has qualified 2 athletes in diving.

Women

Athlete	Event	Preliminary		Semifinals		Final	
Athlete	Event	Points	Rank	Points	Rank	Points	Rank
Mara Aiacoboae	Women's 10m Platform	265.10	21	did not advance			
Corina Popovici	Women's 10m Platform	207.95	31	did not advance			
Mara Aiacoboae; Corina Popovici	Women's 10m Synchro Platform	253.62	12 Q			273.48	12

== Swimming ==
Romania qualified 2 swimmers.

Men

Athlete	Event	Heats		Semifinals		Final	
Athlete	Event	Time	Rank	Time	Rank	Time	Rank
Dragos Arache	Men's 50m Breaststroke	27.75	9 Q	27.71	10	did not advance	
Dragos Arache	Men's 100m Breaststroke	1:01.19	19	did not advance			

Women

Athlete	Event	Heats		Semifinals		Final	
Athlete	Event	Time	Rank	Time	Rank	Time	Rank
Camelia Potec	Women's 400m Freestyle	4:10.36	17			did not advance	
Camelia Potec	Women's 800m Freestyle	8:32.35	14			did not advance	
Camelia Potec	Women's 1500m Freestyle	16:29.79	17			did not advance	

== Water polo ==
=== Men ===
Team Roster

- Dragos Constantin Stoenescu
- Cosmin Alexandru Radu – Captain
- Tiberiu Negrean
- Nicolae Virgil Diaconu
- Andrei Ionut Iosep
- Dan Andrei Busila
- Mihnea Chioveanu
- Alexandru Barabas Matei Guiman
- Dimitri Goanta
- Ramiro Georgescu
- Alexandru Andrei Ghiban
- Kalman Janos Kadar
- Eduard Mihai Dragusin

==== Group B ====
Team	Pld	W	D	L	GF	GA	GD	Pts
Serbia	3	3	0	0	41	19	+22	6
Australia	3	2	0	1	30	27	+3	4
Romania	3	1	0	2	27	31	–4	2
China	3	0	0	3	22	43	–21	0

July 18, 2011; 12:10	Report	Romania	8–9	Australia	Shanghai Oriental Sports Center, Shanghai; Attendance: 500; Referees: Peris (CRO), Koganov (AZE)
July 18, 2011; 12:10	Report	Score by quarters: 2–1, 2–1, 3–3, 1–4			Shanghai Oriental Sports Center, Shanghai; Attendance: 500; Referees: Peris (CRO), Koganov (AZE)
July 18, 2011; 12:10	Report	Three players 2	Goals	Miller 3	Shanghai Oriental Sports Center, Shanghai; Attendance: 500; Referees: Peris (CRO), Koganov (AZE)

July 20, 2011; 09:30	Report	Serbia	12–5	Romania	Shanghai Oriental Sports Center, Shanghai; Attendance: 350; Referees: Stavridis (GRE), Rotsart (USA)
July 20, 2011; 09:30	Report	Score by quarters: 3–1, 3–1, 3–1, 3–2			Shanghai Oriental Sports Center, Shanghai; Attendance: 350; Referees: Stavridis (GRE), Rotsart (USA)
July 20, 2011; 09:30	Report	Prlainović 4	Goals	Radu 2	Shanghai Oriental Sports Center, Shanghai; Attendance: 350; Referees: Stavridis (GRE), Rotsart (USA)

July 22, 2011; 21:00	Report	Romania	14–10	China	Shanghai Oriental Sports Center, Shanghai; Referees: Rotsart (USA), Deslieres (CAN)
July 22, 2011; 21:00	Report	Score by quarters: 2–3, 3–3, 5–0, 4–4			Shanghai Oriental Sports Center, Shanghai; Referees: Rotsart (USA), Deslieres (CAN)
July 22, 2011; 21:00	Report	Radu 8	Goals	Pan Ning 3	Shanghai Oriental Sports Center, Shanghai; Referees: Rotsart (USA), Deslieres (CAN)

==== Playoff round ====
July 24, 2011; 12:10	Report	Montenegro	8–4	Romania	Shanghai Oriental Sports Center, Shanghai; Attendance: 600; Referees: Tulga (TUR), Koganov (AZE)
July 24, 2011; 12:10	Report	Score by quarters: 2–1, 1–2, 3–0, 2–1			Shanghai Oriental Sports Center, Shanghai; Attendance: 600; Referees: Tulga (TUR), Koganov (AZE)
July 24, 2011; 12:10	Report	Brguljan, Jokic 2	Goals	Radu 2	Shanghai Oriental Sports Center, Shanghai; Attendance: 600; Referees: Tulga (TUR), Koganov (AZE)

==== Classification 9–12 ====
July 26, 2011; 11:20	Report	Romania	8–12	Canada	Shanghai Oriental Sports Center, Shanghai; Attendance: 350; Referees: Peris (CRO), Williams (NZL)
July 26, 2011; 11:20	Report	Score by quarters: 2–2, 2–4, 3–3, 1–3			Shanghai Oriental Sports Center, Shanghai; Attendance: 350; Referees: Peris (CRO), Williams (NZL)
July 26, 2011; 11:20	Report	Radu, Negrean 3	Goals	Boyd 4	Shanghai Oriental Sports Center, Shanghai; Attendance: 350; Referees: Peris (CRO), Williams (NZL)

==== Eleventh place game ====
July 28, 2011; 09:30	Report	Romania	15–18	Japan	Shanghai Oriental Sports Center, Shanghai; Attendance: 200; Referees: Reemnet (NED), Bock (GER)
July 28, 2011; 09:30	Report	Score by quarters: 4–3, 3–5, 3–5, 5–5			Shanghai Oriental Sports Center, Shanghai; Attendance: 200; Referees: Reemnet (NED), Bock (GER)
July 28, 2011; 09:30	Report	Kadar 4	Goals	Shiota 8	Shanghai Oriental Sports Center, Shanghai; Attendance: 200; Referees: Reemnet (NED), Bock (GER)
