= 2012–13 LEN Champions League knockout stage =

The knockout stage of the 2012–13 LEN Champions League began on 9 March 2013 and will conclude on 1 June 2013 with the final at Tašmajdan Sports Centre in Belgrade, Serbia.

Times up to 30 March 2013 (eight finals) are UTC+1, thereafter (quarter finals and final four) times are UTC+2.

== Round and draw dates ==
All draws are held in Rome, Italy.

Round	Draw date	First leg	Second leg
Eight Finals	28 February 2013	9–10 March 2013	20–21 March 2013
Quarter finals	25 March 2013	17 April 2013	1 May 2013
Final Four	25 March 2013	31 May–1 June 2013 at Tašmajdan Sports Centre, Belgrade	

== Qualified teams ==
Group	Pot 1	Pot 2	Pot 3	Pot 4
A	(Greece) Vouliagmeni	(Russia) Spartak Volgograd	(Hungary) Eger	(Netherlands) Schuurman
B	(Croatia) Jug Dubrovnik	(Serbia) Crvena Zvezda	(Greece) Olympiacos	(France) Montpellier
C	(Spain) Atlètic-Barceloneta	(Russia) Sintez Kazan	(Italy) Brescia	(France) Marseille
D	(Hungary) Szeged	(Serbia) Partizan	(Turkey) Galatasaray	(Romania) Oradea

== Eight Finals ==
The draw was held on 28 February 2013 in Rome, Italy. The first legs were played on 9–10 March, and the second legs were played on 20–21 March 2013.

Team 1	Agg.	Team 2	1st leg	2nd leg
Crvena Zvezda (Serbia)	21–14	(Hungary) Eger	13–6	8–8
Montpellier (France)	13–27	(Hungary) Szeged	6–9	7–18
Vouliagmeni (Greece)	26–25	(France) Marseille	16–12	10–13
Olympiacos (Greece)	19–21	(Russia) Spartak Volgograd	9–8	10–13
Atlètic-Barceloneta (Spain)	27–13	(Romania) Oradea	15–5	12–8
Schuurman (Netherlands)	8–36	(Croatia) Jug Dubrovnik	1–19	7–17
Partizan (Serbia)	16–11	(Italy) Brescia	9–5	7–6
Galatasaray (Turkey)	20–17	(Russia) Sintez Kazan	9–6	11–11

=== First leg ===
9 March 2013; 12:00	Atlètic-Barceloneta (Spain)	15 – 5	(Romania) Oradea	Barcelona; Referees: Vanhems, Putniković
9 March 2013; 12:00	Perrone 4	(2–0, 6–1, 3–3, 4–1)	Szabó, Chioveanu, Matei, Ghiban, Cimpianu 1	Barcelona; Referees: Vanhems, Putniković
9 March 2013; 12:00		Report		Barcelona; Referees: Vanhems, Putniković

9 March 2013; 17:00	Crvena Zvezda (Serbia)	13 – 6	(Hungary) Eger	Belgrade; Referees: Buch, Caputi
9 March 2013; 17:00	Ranđelović 3	(5–2, 4–1, 2–3, 2–0)	Graham 2	Belgrade; Referees: Buch, Caputi
9 March 2013; 17:00		Report		Belgrade; Referees: Buch, Caputi

9 March 2013; 19:15	Olympiacos (Greece)	9 – 8	(Russia) Spartak Volgograd	Piraeus; Referees: Margareta, Gomez
9 March 2013; 19:15	Fountoulis 3	(4–3, 2–2, 2–2, 1–1)	Stratan, Lisunov 2	Piraeus; Referees: Margareta, Gomez
9 March 2013; 19:15		Report		Piraeus; Referees: Margareta, Gomez

9 March 2013; 20:30	Montpellier (France)	6 – 9	(Hungary) Szeged	Montpellier; Referees: Rak, Katsaros
9 March 2013; 20:30	Kovačić 3	(2–2, 2–2, 2–2, 0–3)	Török 4	Montpellier; Referees: Rak, Katsaros
9 March 2013; 20:30		Report		Montpellier; Referees: Rak, Katsaros

9 March 2013; 20:30	Vouliagmeni (Greece)	16 – 12	(France) Marseille	Vouliagmeni; Referees: Franulović, Sadekov
9 March 2013; 20:30	Komadina 5	(4–2, 3–4, 3–4, 6–2)	Bicari 5	Vouliagmeni; Referees: Franulović, Sadekov
9 March 2013; 20:30		Report		Vouliagmeni; Referees: Franulović, Sadekov

9 March 2013; 20:30	Galatasaray (Turkey)	9 – 6	(Russia) Sintez Kazan	Istanbul; Referees: Kun, Stavridis
9 March 2013; 20:30	Nikić 3	(2–1, 2–1, 3–1, 2–3)	Kuč 3	Istanbul; Referees: Kun, Stavridis
9 March 2013; 20:30		Report		Istanbul; Referees: Kun, Stavridis

10 March 2013; 15:00	Schuurman (Netherlands)	1 – 19	(Croatia) Jug Dubrovnik	Borculo; Referees: Spiegel, Toygarlı
10 March 2013; 15:00	Matthijs 1	(1–6, 0–3, 0–6, 0–4)	Ivović 4	Borculo; Referees: Spiegel, Toygarlı
10 March 2013; 15:00		Report		Borculo; Referees: Spiegel, Toygarlı

10 March 2013; 19:00	Partizan (Serbia)	9 – 5	(Italy) Brescia	Belgrade; Referees: Koryzna, Borrell
10 March 2013; 19:00	Subotić, Dedović, Mitrović, Vukićević 2	(2–0, 3–0, 1–2, 3–3)	Lončar 2	Belgrade; Referees: Koryzna, Borrell
10 March 2013; 19:00		Report		Belgrade; Referees: Koryzna, Borrell

=== Second leg ===
20 March 2013; 18:00	Jug Dubrovnik (Croatia)	17 – 7	(Netherlands) Schuurman	Dubrovnik; Referees: Bouchez, Häntschel
20 March 2013; 18:00	Bošković 5	(4–1, 5–2, 5–2, 3–2)	Tomas 2	Dubrovnik; Referees: Bouchez, Häntschel
20 March 2013; 18:00		Report		Dubrovnik; Referees: Bouchez, Häntschel

Jug Dubrovnik won 36–8 on aggregate.

20 March 2013; 18:00	Sintez Kazan (Russia)	11 – 11	(Turkey) Galatasaray	Kazan; Referees: Gomez, Golijanin
20 March 2013; 18:00	Stepanyuk, Kuč, Elizarov 3	(2–2, 2–2, 4–4, 3–3)	Nikić, Aksentijević 3	Kazan; Referees: Gomez, Golijanin
20 March 2013; 18:00		Report		Kazan; Referees: Gomez, Golijanin

Galatasaray won 20–17 on aggregate.

20 March 2013; 19:00	Spartak Volgograd (Russia)	13 – 10	(Greece) Olympiacos	Volgograd; Referees: Peris, Székely
20 March 2013; 19:00	Stratan 5	(2–2, 3–4, 5–2, 3–2)	Kolomvos 3	Volgograd; Referees: Peris, Székely
20 March 2013; 19:00		Report		Volgograd; Referees: Peris, Székely

Spartak Volgograd won 21–19 on aggregate.

20 March 2013; 19:00	Eger (Hungary)	8 – 8	(Serbia) Crvena Zvezda	Eger; Referees: Stavropulos, Severo
20 March 2013; 19:00	Salamon 3	(2–2, 0–2, 3–2, 3–1)	Prlainović 3	Eger; Referees: Stavropulos, Severo
20 March 2013; 19:00		Report		Eger; Referees: Stavropulos, Severo

Crvena Zvezda won 21–14 on aggregate.

20 March 2013; 19:30	Brescia (Italy)	6 – 7	(Serbia) Partizan	Brescia; Referees: Alexandrescu, Vasileiou
20 March 2013; 19:30	Presciutti 2	(1–2, 1–1, 3–2, 1–2)	Mandić 3	Brescia; Referees: Alexandrescu, Vasileiou
20 March 2013; 19:30		Report		Brescia; Referees: Alexandrescu, Vasileiou

Partizan won 16–11 on aggregate.

20 March 2013; 19:30	Marseille (France)	13 – 10	(Greece) Vouliagmeni	Marseille; Referees: Koganov, Stampalija
20 March 2013; 19:30	Bicari 4	(3–3, 5–1, 3–4, 2–2)	Gounas 3	Marseille; Referees: Koganov, Stampalija
20 March 2013; 19:30		Report		Marseille; Referees: Koganov, Stampalija

Vouliagmeni won 26–25 on aggregate.

20 March 2013; 20:00	Oradea (Romania)	8 – 12	(Spain) Atlètic-Barceloneta	Oradea; Referees: Fekete, Savarese
20 March 2013; 20:00	Diaconu 2	(2–3, 2–3, 3–4, 1–2)	Minguell 3	Oradea; Referees: Fekete, Savarese
20 March 2013; 20:00		Report		Oradea; Referees: Fekete, Savarese

Atlètic-Barceloneta won 27–13 on aggregate.

21 March 2013; 18:00	Szeged (Hungary)	18 – 7	(France) Montpellier	Szeged; Referees: Teule, Türkkan
21 March 2013; 18:00	Kayes 5	(4–2, 5–2, 4–1, 5–2)	Kovačić 3	Szeged; Referees: Teule, Türkkan
21 March 2013; 18:00		Report		Szeged; Referees: Teule, Türkkan

Szeged won 27–13 on aggregate.

== Quarter finals ==
The draw was held on 25 March 2013 in Rome, Italy. The first legs were played on 17 April, and the second legs were played on 1 May 2013.

Team 1	Agg.	Team 2	1st leg	2nd leg
Galatasaray (Turkey)	1	(Croatia) Jug Dubrovnik	17 April	1 May
Vouliagmeni (Greece)	2	(Spain) Atlètic-Barceloneta	17 April	1 May
Szeged (Hungary)	3	(Serbia) Crvena Zvezda	17 April	1 May
Partizan (Serbia)	4	(Russia) Spartak Volgograd	17 April	1 May

=== First leg ===
17 April 2013; 12:00	Szeged (Hungary)	–	(Serbia) Crvena Zvezda	Szeged; Referees: Borrell, Koganov
17 April 2013; 12:00		Report		Szeged; Referees: Borrell, Koganov
