= Romania at the 2025 World Aquatics Championships =

- Flag of Romania
- World Aquatics code: ROU
- National federation: Romanian Federation of Swimming and Modern Pentathlon

in Singapore
- Competitors: 21 in 4 sports
- Medals Ranked 10th: Gold 2 Silver 0 Bronze 1 Total 3

World Aquatics Championships appearances
- 1973; 1975; 1978; 1982; 1986; 1991; 1994; 1998; 2001; 2003; 2005; 2007; 2009; 2011; 2013; 2015; 2017; 2019; 2022; 2023; 2024; 2025

Romania competed at the 2025 World Aquatics Championships in Singapore from 11 July to 3 August 2025.

== Medalists ==
Medal	Name	Sport	Event	Date
1st place, gold medalist(s)	David Popovici	Swimming	Men's 200 m freestyle	29 July 2025
1st place, gold medalist(s)	David Popovici	Swimming	Men's 100 m freestyle	31 July 2025
3rd place, bronze medalist(s)	Constantin Popovici	High diving	Men	27 July 2025

== Competitors ==
The following is the list of competitors in the Championships.

Sport	Men	Women	Total
Diving	1	1	2
High diving	2	0	2
Swimming	2	0	2
Water polo	15	0	15
Total	20	1	21

== Diving ==
Men

Athlete	Event	Preliminaries		Semifinals		Final	
Athlete	Event	Points	Rank	Points	Rank	Points	Rank
Alexandru Avasiloae	1 m springboard	310.25	31	—		Did not advance	
Alexandru Avasiloae	3 m springboard	321.75	48	Did not advance			

Women

Athlete	Event	Preliminaries		Semifinals		Final	
Athlete	Event	Points	Rank	Points	Rank	Points	Rank
Nicoleta Muscalu	10 m platform	175.15	34	did not advance			

== High diving ==
Two athletes were named to the World Championships roster.

Men

Athlete	Event	Points	Rank
Constantin Popovici	Men's high diving	408.70	3rd place, bronze medalist(s)
Cătălin Preda	Men's high diving	405.25	5

== Swimming ==
Romania entered 2 swimmers.

Men

Athlete	Event	Heat		Semifinal		Final	
Athlete	Event	Time	Rank	Time	Rank	Time	Rank
Denis Laurean Popescu	50 metre backstroke	25.34	33	Did not advance			
Denis Laurean Popescu	100 metre backstroke	54.80	33	Did not advance			
Denis Laurean Popescu	50 m butterfly	23.66	34	Did not advance			
Denis Laurean Popescu	100 m butterfly	51.61	18	Did not advance			
David Popovici	50 metre freestyle	Did not start		Did not advance			
David Popovici	100 metre freestyle	47.48	1 Q	46.84	2 Q	46.51 CR, ER	1st place, gold medalist(s)
David Popovici	200 metre freestyle	1:45.43	1 Q	1:45.02	4 Q	1:43.54	1st place, gold medalist(s)

== Water polo ==
Summary

Team	Event	Group stage				Playoff	9th–12th Semifinal	9th place match	
Team	Event	Opposition Score	Opposition Score	Opposition Score	Rank	Opposition Score	Opposition Score	Opposition Score	Rank
Romania	Men's tournament	Italy; L 5–17	South Africa; W 24–5	Serbia; L 9–19	3 Q	Hungary; L 11–15	Canada; W 18–12	Japan; L 19–20; PSO 3–4	10

=== Men's tournament ===
Romania's men's water polo team qualified by finishing in the top two at the 2025 FINA Men's Water Polo World Cup in Bucharest, Romania.

Team roster

The following is the Romanian roster.

Head coach: Bogdan Rath

- 1 Marius-Florin Tic GK
- 2 Francesco Iudean FP
- 3 Matei-Ioan Lutescu FP
- 4 Tudor-Andrei Fulea FP
- 5 Andrei Neamtu FP
- 6 Andrei Prioteasa FP
- 7 Andrei Tepelus FP
- 8 Nicolae Olanta FP
- 9 Alexandru Gheorghe FP
- 10 Vlad-Luca Georgescu FP
- 11 Sebastian Oltean FP
- 12 Levente Vancsik FP
- 13 Eduard-Mihai Dragusin GK
- 14 David Belenyesi FP
- 15 David-Joan Bota FP

Group play

Pos	Team	Pld	W	PSW	PSL	L	GF	GA	GD	Pts	Qualification
1	Italy	3	2	1	0	0	58	22	+36	8	Quarterfinals
2	Serbia	3	2	0	1	0	59	25	+34	7	Playoffs
3	Romania	3	1	0	0	2	38	41	−3	3	Playoffs
4	South Africa	3	0	0	0	3	12	79	−67	0	13–16th place semifinals

Source: Omegatiming
Rules for classification: 1) points; 2) head-to-head points; 3) head-to-head goal difference; 4) head-to-head number of goals scored; 5) Goal difference.

12 July 2025; 20:45	Report	Romania	5–17	Italy	OCBC Aquatic Centre, Singapore; Referees: Zhang Liang (CHN), Georgios Stavridis (GRE)
12 July 2025; 20:45	Report	Score by quarters: 2–1, 0–5, 2–6, 1–5			OCBC Aquatic Centre, Singapore; Referees: Zhang Liang (CHN), Georgios Stavridis (GRE)
12 July 2025; 20:45	Report	Neamtu 3	Goals	Condemi 4	OCBC Aquatic Centre, Singapore; Referees: Zhang Liang (CHN), Georgios Stavridis (GRE)

14 July 2025; 10:35	Report	South Africa	5–24	Romania	OCBC Aquatic Centre, Singapore; Referees: Evan Andrews (CAN), Andrej Franulović (CRO)
14 July 2025; 10:35	Report	Score by quarters: 0–8, 1–3, 3–7, 1–6			OCBC Aquatic Centre, Singapore; Referees: Evan Andrews (CAN), Andrej Franulović (CRO)
14 July 2025; 10:35	Report	D. Sneddon 2	Goals	Georgescu, Iudean 4	OCBC Aquatic Centre, Singapore; Referees: Evan Andrews (CAN), Andrej Franulović (CRO)

16 July 2025; 16:00	Report	Serbia	19–9	Romania	OCBC Aquatic Centre, Singapore; Referees: Stanko Ivanovski (MKD), Jennifer McCall (USA)
16 July 2025; 16:00	Report	Score by quarters: 5–1, 4–1, 5–3, 5–4			OCBC Aquatic Centre, Singapore; Referees: Stanko Ivanovski (MKD), Jennifer McCall (USA)
16 July 2025; 16:00	Report	Ranđelović 4	Goals	three players 2	OCBC Aquatic Centre, Singapore; Referees: Stanko Ivanovski (MKD), Jennifer McCall (USA)

Playoff

18 July 2025; 17:35	Report	Romania	11–15	Hungary	OCBC Aquatic Centre, Singapore; Referees: Germán Moller (ARG), Georgios Stavridis (GRE)
18 July 2025; 17:35	Report	Score by quarters: 3–6, 3–2, 3–3, 2–4			OCBC Aquatic Centre, Singapore; Referees: Germán Moller (ARG), Georgios Stavridis (GRE)
18 July 2025; 17:35	Report	Georgescu 4	Goals	Burián 3	OCBC Aquatic Centre, Singapore; Referees: Germán Moller (ARG), Georgios Stavridis (GRE)

9th–12th place semifinals

20 July 2025; 13:45	Report	Romania	18–12	Canada	OCBC Aquatic Centre, Singapore; Referees: Stanko Ivanovski (MNE), Nicholas Hodgers (AUS)
20 July 2025; 13:45	Report	Score by quarters: 5–1, 3–3, 5–4, 5–4			OCBC Aquatic Centre, Singapore; Referees: Stanko Ivanovski (MNE), Nicholas Hodgers (AUS)
20 July 2025; 13:45	Report	Iudean 5	Goals	D'Souza 4	OCBC Aquatic Centre, Singapore; Referees: Stanko Ivanovski (MNE), Nicholas Hodgers (AUS)

9th place match

22 July 2025; 10:35	Report	Japan	20–19	Romania	OCBC Aquatic Centre, Singapore; Referees: Alessia Ferrari (ITA), Scott Voltz (USA)
22 July 2025; 10:35	Report	Score by quarters: 8–1, 4–3, 2–8, 2–4 PSO: 4–3			OCBC Aquatic Centre, Singapore; Referees: Alessia Ferrari (ITA), Scott Voltz (USA)
22 July 2025; 10:35	Report	Inaba 5	Goals	Georgescu, Neamțu 3	OCBC Aquatic Centre, Singapore; Referees: Alessia Ferrari (ITA), Scott Voltz (USA)
