= Alexandru Matei =

Alexandru Matei may refer to:

- Alexandru Matei (water polo) (born 1980), Romanian water polo player
- Alexandru Matei (footballer) (born 2008), Romanian footballer

== See also ==
- Alexandru Mateiu (born 1989), Romanian footballer
