= Romania at the 2017 World Aquatics Championships =

- Flag of Romania
- World Aquatics code: ROU
- National federation: Federatiei Romane de Natatie si Pentatlon Modern
- Website: www.swimming.ro

in Budapest, Hungary
- Competitors: 6 in 2 sports
- Medals: Gold 0 Silver 0 Bronze 0 Total 0

World Aquatics Championships appearances
- 1973; 1975; 1978; 1982; 1986; 1991; 1994; 1998; 2001; 2003; 2005; 2007; 2009; 2011; 2013; 2015; 2017; 2019; 2022; 2023; 2024; 2025

Romania is scheduled to compete at the 2017 World Aquatics Championships in Budapest, Hungary from 14 July to 30 July.

== Diving ==
Romania has entered two divers (one male and one female).

Athlete	Event	Preliminaries		Semifinals		Final	
Athlete	Event	Points	Rank	Points	Rank	Points	Rank
Aurelian Dragomir	Men's 10 m platform	278.35	42	Did not advance			
Anca Serb	Women's 1 m springboard	204.95	37	—		Did not advance	
Anca Serb	Women's 3 m springboard	244.95	29	Did not advance			
Anca Serb; Aurelian Dragomir	Mixed team	—				250.60	19

== Swimming ==
Romanian swimmers have achieved qualifying standards in the following events (up to a maximum of two swimmers in each event at the A-standard entry time, and one at the B-standard):

Athlete	Event	Heat		Semifinal		Final	
Athlete	Event	Time	Rank	Time	Rank	Time	Rank
Alin Artimon	Men's 400 m freestyle	3:53.45	30	—		Did not advance	
Alin Coste	Men's 50 m freestyle	23.04	54	Did not advance			
Marius Radu	Men's 100 m freestyle	49.86	44	Did not advance			
Bogdan Scarlat	Men's 1500 m freestyle	15:26.18	29	—		Did not advance	
