= Romania at the 2015 World Aquatics Championships =

- Flag of Romania
- World Aquatics code: ROU
- National federation: Federatiei Romane de Natatie si Pentatlon Modern
- Website: www.swimming.ro

in Kazan, Russia
- Competitors: 6 in 2 sports
- Medals: Gold 0 Silver 0 Bronze 0 Total 0

World Aquatics Championships appearances
- 1973; 1975; 1978; 1982; 1986; 1991; 1994; 1998; 2001; 2003; 2005; 2007; 2009; 2011; 2013; 2015; 2017; 2019; 2022; 2023; 2024; 2025

Romania competed at the 2015 World Aquatics Championships in Kazan, Russia from 24 July to 9 August 2015.

== Diving ==
Romanian divers qualified for the individual spots and synchronized teams at the World Championships.

Men

Athlete	Event	Preliminaries		Semifinals		Final	
Athlete	Event	Points	Rank	Points	Rank	Points	Rank
Cătălin Cozma	10 m platform	331.85	38	did not advance			

Women

Athlete	Event	Preliminaries		Semifinals		Final	
Athlete	Event	Points	Rank	Points	Rank	Points	Rank
Mara Aiacoboae	10 m platform	306.50	19	did not advance			

Mixed

Athlete	Event	Final	
Athlete	Event	Points	Rank
Mara Aiacoboae; Cătălin Cozma	10 m synchronized platform	286.92	11
Mara Aiacoboae; Cătălin Cozma	Team	318.95	13

== Swimming ==
Romanian swimmers have achieved qualifying standards in the following events (up to a maximum of 2 swimmers in each event at the A-standard entry time, and 1 at the B-standard):

Men

Athlete	Event	Heat		Semifinal		Final	
Athlete	Event	Time	Rank	Time	Rank	Time	Rank
Alin Artimon	400 m freestyle	3:57.79	51	—N/a		did not advance	
Alin Artimon	800 m freestyle	8:17.16	37	—N/a		did not advance	
Alexandru Coci	100 m butterfly	52.89	=27	did not advance			
Alexandru Coci	200 m butterfly	1:58.43	22	did not advance			
Robert Glință	50 m backstroke	25.48	22	did not advance			
Robert Glință	100 m backstroke	55.07	30	did not advance			
Marius Radu	50 m freestyle	22.65	24	did not advance			
Marius Radu	100 m freestyle	49.56	=29	did not advance			
Marius Radu; Daniel Macovei; Alexandru Coci; Robert Glință	4 × 100 m freestyle relay	3:18.13	16	—N/a		did not advance	
