= Romania at the 2024 World Aquatics Championships =

- Flag of Romania
- FINA code: ROU
- National federation: Romanian Federation of Swimming and Modern Pentathlon
- Website: frnpm.ro (in Romanian)

in Doha, Qatar
- Competitors: 23 in 4 sports
- Medals Ranked 34th: Gold 0 Silver 0 Bronze 1 Total 1

World Aquatics Championships appearances
- 1973; 1975; 1978; 1982; 1986; 1991; 1994; 1998; 2001; 2003; 2005; 2007; 2009; 2011; 2013; 2015; 2017; 2019; 2022; 2023; 2024

Romania competed at the 2024 World Aquatics Championships in Doha, Qatar from 2 to 18 February.

== Medalists ==
Medal	Name	Sport	Event	Date
3rd place, bronze medalist(s)	Cătălin Preda	High diving	Men	15 February 2024

== Competitors ==
The following is the list of competitors in the Championships.

Sport	Men	Women	Total
Diving	1*	1	2*
High diving	2*	0	2*
Swimming	5	0	5
Water polo	15	0	15
Total	22*	1	23*

- Constantin Popovici competed in both diving and high diving.

== Diving ==
Men

Athlete	Event	Preliminaries		Semifinals		Final	
Athlete	Event	Points	Rank	Points	Rank	Points	Rank
Constantin Popovici	10 m platform	257.10	40	Did not advance			

Women

Athlete	Event	Preliminaries		Semifinals		Final	
Athlete	Event	Points	Rank	Points	Rank	Points	Rank
Nicoleta Muscalu	10 m platform	209.40	36	Did not advance			

== High diving ==
Athlete	Event	Points	Rank
Constantin Popovici	Men's high diving	340.50	8
Cătălin Preda	Men's high diving	410.20	3rd place, bronze medalist(s)

== Swimming ==
Romania entered 5 swimmers.

Men

Athlete	Event	Heat		Semifinal		Final	
Athlete	Event	Time	Rank	Time	Rank	Time	Rank
Andrei-Mircea Anghel	50 metre backstroke	26.36	32	Did not advance			
Robert-Andrei Badea	200 metre individual medley	2:01.78	18	Did not advance			
Robert-Andrei Badea	400 metre individual medley	4:18.43 NR	9	—		Did not advance	
Patrick Dinu	100 metre freestyle	49.53	33	Did not advance			
Denis-Laurean Popescu	100 metre backstroke	55.33	25	Did not advance			
Denis-Laurean Popescu	200 metre backstroke	2:02.05	24	Did not advance			
Vlad Stancu	400 metre freestyle	3:52.97	31	—		Did not advance	
Vlad Stancu	800 metre freestyle	8:06.50	31	—		Did not advance	
Vlad Stancu	1500 metre freestyle	15:20.50	20	—		Did not advance	

== Water polo ==
Summary

Team	Event	Group stage				Playoff	Quarterfinal	Semifinal	Final / BM	
Team	Event	Opposition Score	Opposition Score	Opposition Score	Rank	Opposition Score	Opposition Score	Opposition Score	Opposition Score	Rank
Romania	Men's tournament	Hungary; L 8–15	Kazakhstan; W 25–3	Italy; L 10-16	3 QP	Montenegro; L 9–12	—	China; W 9–7	United States; L 9–12	10

=== Men's tournament ===
Team roster

The following is the Romanian roster.

Head coach: Bogdan Rath

- 1 Marius-Florin Tic GK
- 2 David Belenyesi FP
- 3 Matei-Ioan Lutescu FP
- 4 Tudor-Andrei Fulea FP
- 5 Ionut-Valentin Vranceanu FP
- 6 Andrei Prioteasa FP
- 7 Andrei Tepelus FP
- 8 Nicolae Olanta FP
- 9 Silvian Colodrovschi FP
- 10 Vlad-Luca Georgescu FP
- 11 Francesco Iudean FP
- 12 Levente Vancsik FP
- 13 Eduard-Mihai Dragusin GK
- 14 Andrei Neamtu FP
- 15 David-Joan Bota FP

Group play

Pos	Team	Pld	W	PSW	PSL	L	GF	GA	GD	Pts	Qualification
1	Hungary	3	2	1	0	0	52	18	+34	8	Quarterfinals
2	Italy	3	2	0	1	0	58	22	+36	7	Playoffs
3	Romania	3	1	0	0	2	43	34	+9	3	Playoffs
4	Kazakhstan	3	0	0	0	3	7	86	−79	0	13–16th place semifinals

Source: World Aquatics
Rules for classification: 1) points; 2) head-to-head points; 3) head-to-head goal difference; 4) head-to-head number of goals scored; 5) Goal difference.

5 February 2024; 20:30	Report	Romania	8–15	Hungary	Aspire Dome, Doha; Referees: Xavi Buch (ESP), Sébastien Dervieux (FRA)
5 February 2024; 20:30	Report	Score by quarters: 2–5, 2–5, 3–2, 1–3			Aspire Dome, Doha; Referees: Xavi Buch (ESP), Sébastien Dervieux (FRA)
5 February 2024; 20:30	Report	Fulea, Georgescu 2	Goals	Vámos, Zalánki 3	Aspire Dome, Doha; Referees: Xavi Buch (ESP), Sébastien Dervieux (FRA)

7 February 2024; 16:00	Report	Kazakhstan	3–25	Romania	Aspire Dome, Doha; Referees: Zhang Liang (CHN), Matan Schwartz (ISR)
7 February 2024; 16:00	Report	Score by quarters: 1–7, 1–6, 0–5, 1–7			Aspire Dome, Doha; Referees: Zhang Liang (CHN), Matan Schwartz (ISR)
7 February 2024; 16:00	Report	three players 1	Goals	Fulea, Prioteasa 5	Aspire Dome, Doha; Referees: Zhang Liang (CHN), Matan Schwartz (ISR)

9 February 2024; 12:00	Report	Romania	10–16	Italy	Aspire Dome, Doha; Referees: Sébastien Dervieux (FRA), Lucas Letshabo (RSA)
9 February 2024; 12:00	Report	Score by quarters: 3–4, 4–4, 2–5, 1–3			Aspire Dome, Doha; Referees: Sébastien Dervieux (FRA), Lucas Letshabo (RSA)
9 February 2024; 12:00	Report	Georgescu 3	Goals	Di Fulvio 5	Aspire Dome, Doha; Referees: Sébastien Dervieux (FRA), Lucas Letshabo (RSA)

Playoffs

11 February 2024; 17:30	Report	Montenegro	12–9	Romania	Aspire Dome, Doha; Referees: György Kun (HUN), Alessandro Severo (ITA)
11 February 2024; 17:30	Report	Score by quarters: 3–5, 4–1, 2–2, 3–1			Aspire Dome, Doha; Referees: György Kun (HUN), Alessandro Severo (ITA)
11 February 2024; 17:30	Report	Averka, Perković 3	Goals	Fulea 3	Aspire Dome, Doha; Referees: György Kun (HUN), Alessandro Severo (ITA)

9–12th place semifinals

13 February 2024; 12:00	Report	China	7–9	Romania	Aspire Dome, Doha; Referees: György Kun (HUN), Andreia Stanojević (SRB)
13 February 2024; 12:00	Report	Score by quarters: 2–1, 2–2, 1–4, 2–2			Aspire Dome, Doha; Referees: György Kun (HUN), Andreia Stanojević (SRB)
13 February 2024; 12:00	Report	Chen Z., Zhang C. 3	Goals	Georgescu 3	Aspire Dome, Doha; Referees: György Kun (HUN), Andreia Stanojević (SRB)

Eleventh place game

15 February 2024; 10:30	Report	Romania	9–13	United States	Aspire Dome, Doha; Referees: Stanko Ivanovski (MNE), David Couper (NZL)
15 February 2024; 10:30	Report	Score by quarters: 2–5, 2–2, 4–3, 1–3			Aspire Dome, Doha; Referees: Stanko Ivanovski (MNE), David Couper (NZL)
15 February 2024; 10:30	Report	Georgescu 4	Goals	Bowen, Irving 3	Aspire Dome, Doha; Referees: Stanko Ivanovski (MNE), David Couper (NZL)
