= Alexandru Szabo =

Romanian water polo player

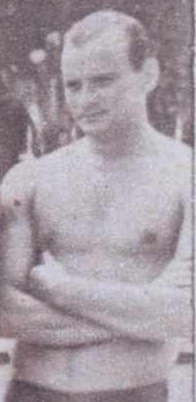

Personal information
- Nationality: Romanian
- Born: 20 January 1937 (age 89) Brașov, Romania

Sport
- Sport: Water polo

Alexandru Szabo (born 20 January 1937) is a Romanian water polo player. He competed at the 1956 Summer Olympics, the 1960 Summer Olympics and the 1964 Summer Olympics.

== See also ==
- Romania men's Olympic water polo team records and statistics
