= Zoltan Norman =

Romanian water polo player

Personal information
- Nationality: Romanian
- Born: 5 December 1919; Timișoara, Romania
- Died: 27 December 2001 (aged 82)

Sport
- Sport: Water polo

Zoltan Norman (4 December 1919 – 27 December 2001) was a Romanian water polo player. He competed in the men's tournament at the 1952 Summer Olympics.

== See also ==
- Romania men's Olympic water polo team records and statistics
- List of men's Olympic water polo tournament goalkeepers
