= Doru Spînu =

Romanian water polo player

Personal information
- Nationality: Romanian
- Born: 23 August 1955 (age 69); Bucharest, Romania

Sport
- Sport: Water polo

Doru Spînu (born 23 August 1955) is a Romanian former water polo player. He competed at the 1976 Summer Olympics and the 1980 Summer Olympics.

== See also ==
- Romania men's Olympic water polo team records and statistics
- List of men's Olympic water polo tournament goalkeepers
