= Alexandru Marinescu (water polo) =

Romanian water polo player

Personal information
- Nationality: Romanian
- Born: 23 October 1932 (age 92)

Sport
- Sport: Water polo

Alexandru Marinescu (born 23 October 1932) is a Romanian water polo player. He competed in the men's tournament at the 1956 Summer Olympics.

== See also ==
- Romania men's Olympic water polo team records and statistics
- List of men's Olympic water polo tournament goalkeepers
