= Romania at the 1973 World Aquatics Championships =

- Flag of Romania
- World Aquatics code: ROU
- National federation: Romanian Federation of Swimming and Modern Pentathlon
- Website: frnpm.ro (in Romanian)

in Belgrade, Yugoslavia
- Medals: Gold 0 Silver 0 Bronze 0 Total 0

World Aquatics Championships appearances
- 1973; 1975; 1978; 1982; 1986; 1991; 1994; 1998; 2001; 2003; 2005; 2007; 2009; 2011; 2013; 2015; 2017; 2019; 2022; 2023; 2024; 2025

Romania competed at the 1973 World Aquatics Championships in Belgrade, Yugoslavia from August 31 to September 9.

== Diving ==
| Athlete | Event | Preliminaries | | Final | |
| Athlete | Event | Points | Rank | Points | Rank |
|---|---|---|---|---|---|
| Sorana Prelipceanu | Women's springboard | 326.70 | 19 | did not advance | |
| Melanija Decusara | Women's springboard | 290.85 | 21 | did not advance | |
| Melanija Decusara | Women's platform | 282.90 | 19 | did not advance | |
