= Emil Mureșan =

Romanian water polo player

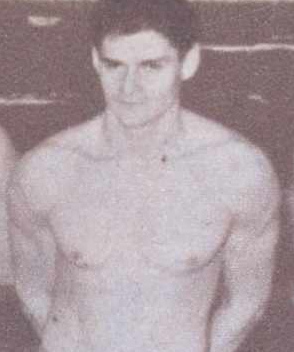
- Emil Mureșan in 1965

Personal information
- Nationality: Romanian
- Born: 12 September 1939 (age 86) Mediaș, Romania

Sport
- Sport: Water polo
Medal record
Representing Romania
Summer Universiade
Bronze medal – third place	1965 Budapest	Men's tournament

Emil Mureșan (born 12 September 1939) is a Romanian water polo player. He competed in the men's tournament at the 1964 Summer Olympics.

== See also ==
- Romania men's Olympic water polo team records and statistics
- List of men's Olympic water polo tournament goalkeepers
