= Cornel Frățilă =

Romanian water polo player

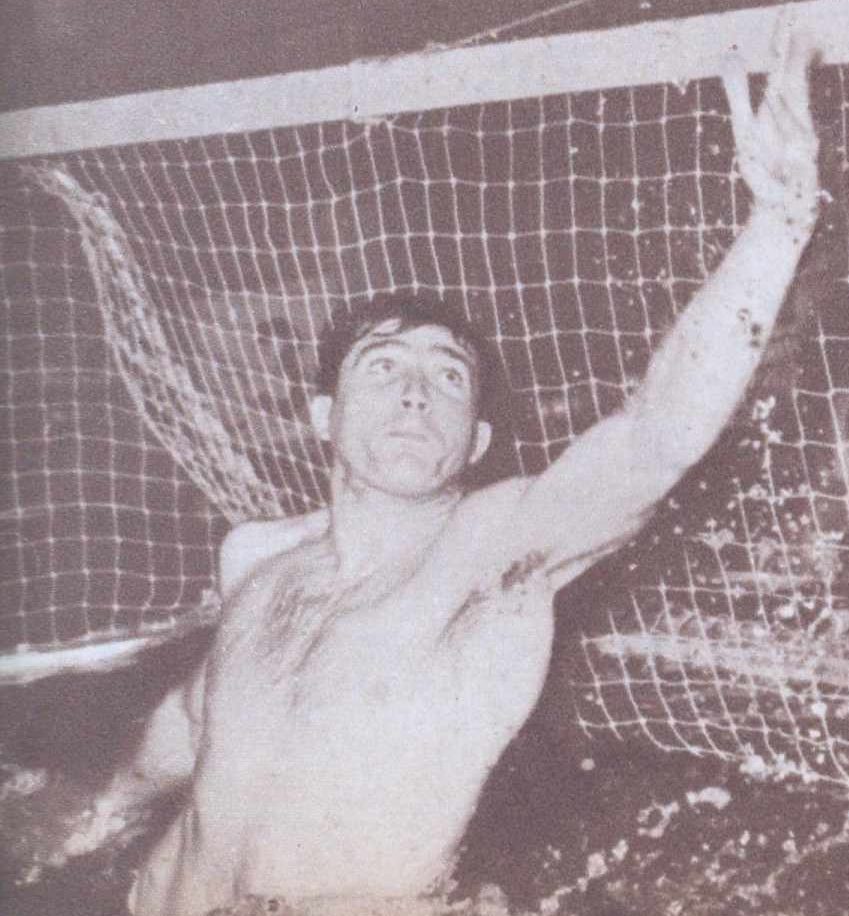

Personal information
- Nationality: Romanian
- Born: 7 August 1941 (age 84) Bucharest, Romania

Sport
- Sport: Water polo

Cornel Frățilă (born 7 August 1941) is a Romanian former water polo player. He competed in the men's tournament at the 1972 Summer Olympics.

== See also ==
- Romania men's Olympic water polo team records and statistics
- List of men's Olympic water polo tournament goalkeepers
