= Romania at the 2023 World Aquatics Championships =

- Flag of Romania
- World Aquatics code: ROU
- National federation: Romanian Federation of Swimming and Modern Pentathlon
- Website: frnpm.ro (in Romanian)

in Fukuoka, Japan
- Competitors: 7 in 3 sports
- Medals Ranked 17th: Gold 1 Silver 1 Bronze 0 Total 2

World Aquatics Championships appearances
- 1973; 1975; 1978; 1982; 1986; 1991; 1994; 1998; 2001; 2003; 2005; 2007; 2009; 2011; 2013; 2015; 2017; 2019; 2022; 2023; 2024; 2025

Romania competed at the 2023 World Aquatics Championships in Fukuoka, Japan from 14 to 30 July.

== Medalists ==
Medal	Name	Sport	Event	Date
Gold	Constantin Popovici	High diving	Men's high diving	July 27
Silver	Cătălin Preda	High diving	Men's high diving	July 27

== Diving ==
Romania entered 4 divers.

Men

Athlete	Event	Preliminaries		Semifinals		Final	
Athlete	Event	Points	Rank	Points	Rank	Points	Rank
Alexandru Avasiloae	1 m springboard	275.40	46	—N/a		Did not advance	
Alexandru Avasiloae	3 m springboard	331.25	41	Did not advance			
Constantin Popovici	10 m platform	376.80	18 Q	334.80	18	Did not advance	

Women

Athlete	Event	Preliminaries		Semifinals		Final	
Athlete	Event	Points	Rank	Points	Rank	Points	Rank
Amelie Foerster	1 m springboard	190.85	39	—N/a		Did not advance	
Amelie Foerster	3 m springboard	188.95	48	Did not advance			
Nicoleta Muscalu	10 m platform	248.50	25	Did not advance			

== High diving ==
Athlete	Event	Points	Rank
Constantin Popovici	Men's high diving	472.80	1st place, gold medalist(s)
Cătălin Preda	Men's high diving	438.45	2nd place, silver medalist(s)

== Swimming ==
Romania entered 2 swimmers.

Men

Athlete	Event	Heat		Semifinal		Final	
Athlete	Event	Time	Rank	Time	Rank	Time	Rank
Andrei-Mircea Anghel	50 m backstroke	24.86	9 Q	24.95	10	Did not advance	
Andrei-Mircea Anghel	100 m backstroke	55.77	34	Did not advance			
David Popovici	100 m freestyle	47.90	6 Q	47.66	5 Q	47.83	6
David Popovici	200 m freestyle	1:45.86	3 Q	1:44.70	1 Q	1:44.90	4
