= Șerban Huber =

Romanian water polo player

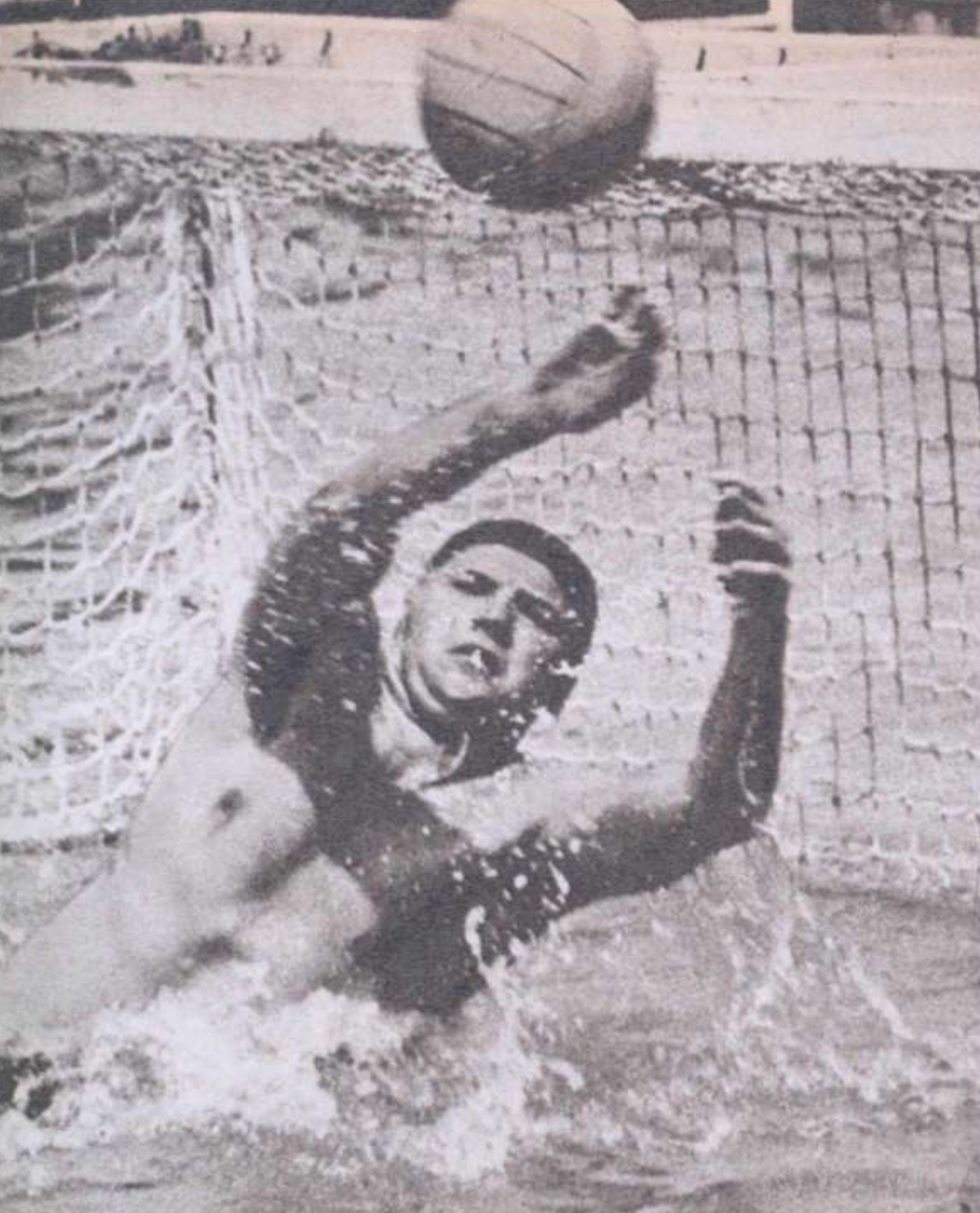
- Șerban Huber, 1972

Personal information
- Nationality: Romanian
- Born: 11 May 1951 (age 75)

Sport
- Sport: Water polo

Șerban Huber (born 11 May 1951) is a Romanian water polo player. He competed in the men's tournament at the 1972 Summer Olympics.

== See also ==
- Romania men's Olympic water polo team records and statistics
- List of men's Olympic water polo tournament goalkeepers
