= Gelu Lisac =

Romanian water polo player

Personal information
- Born: November 19, 1967 (age 57); Bucharest, Romania

Sport
- Sport: Water polo

Gelu Lisac (born 19 November 1967) is a Romanian former water polo player who competed in the 1996 Summer Olympics.

== See also ==
- Romania men's Olympic water polo team records and statistics
- List of men's Olympic water polo tournament goalkeepers
