= Romania at the 2022 World Aquatics Championships =

- Flag of Romania
- World Aquatics code: ROU
- National federation: Romanian Federation of Swimming and Modern Pentathlon
- Website: frnpm.ro (in Romanian)

in Budapest, Hungary
- Competitors: 4 in 2 sports
- Medals Ranked 13th: Gold 2 Silver 0 Bronze 0 Total 2

World Aquatics Championships appearances
- 1973; 1975; 1978; 1982; 1986; 1991; 1994; 1998; 2001; 2003; 2005; 2007; 2009; 2011; 2013; 2015; 2017; 2019; 2022; 2023; 2024; 2025

Romania competed at the 2022 World Aquatics Championships in Budapest, Hungary from 17 June to 3 July.

== Medalists ==
Medal	Name	Sport	Event	Date
Gold	David Popovici	Swimming	Men's 200 metre freestyle	June 20
Gold	David Popovici	Swimming	Men's 100 metre freestyle	June 22

== Diving ==
Romania entered two divers.

Men

Athlete	Event	Preliminaries		Semifinals		Final	
Athlete	Event	Points	Rank	Points	Rank	Points	Rank
Constantin Popovici	10 m platform	345.10	21	did not advance			

Women

Athlete	Event	Preliminaries		Semifinals		Final	
Athlete	Event	Points	Rank	Points	Rank	Points	Rank
Nicoleta Muscalu	10 m platform	236.15	22	did not advance			

== Swimming ==
Romania entered two swimmers..

Men

Athlete	Event	Heat		Semifinal		Final	
Athlete	Event	Time	Rank	Time	Rank	Time	Rank
Robert Glință	50 m backstroke	24.79	7 Q	24.54	6 Q	24.57	=5
Robert Glință	100 m backstroke	53.86	13 Q	53.00	8 Q	53.63	8
David Popovici	100 m freestyle	47.60	1 Q	47.13	1 Q	47.58	1st place, gold medalist(s)
David Popovici	200 m freestyle	1:45.18	1 Q	1:44.40	1 Q	1:43.21	1st place, gold medalist(s)
