= Iosif Deutsch =

Romanian water polo player

Personal information
- Nationality: Romanian
- Born: 9 May 1932; Oradea, Romania
- Died: December 1992 (aged 60)

Sport
- Sport: Water polo

Iosif Deutsch (9 May 1932 – December 1992) was a Romanian water polo player. He competed in the men's tournament at the 1956 Summer Olympics.

== See also ==
- Romania men's Olympic water polo team records and statistics
- List of men's Olympic water polo tournament goalkeepers
