= Claudiu Rusu =

Romanian water polo player

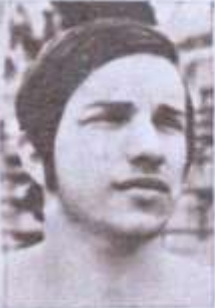

Personal information
- Nationality: Romanian
- Born: 15 February 1949 (age 76) Cluj-Napoca, Romania

Sport
- Sport: Water polo

Claudiu Rusu (born 15 February 1949) is a Romanian water polo player. He competed at the 1972 Summer Olympics, the 1976 Summer Olympics and the 1980 Summer Olympics.

== See also ==
- Romania men's Olympic water polo team records and statistics
