= Dinu Popescu =

Romanian water polo player

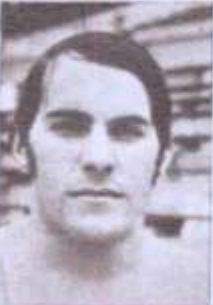
- Popescu in 1972

Personal information
- Nationality: Romanian
- Born: 27 June 1949 (age 77) Bucharest, Romania

Sport
- Sport: Water polo

Dinu Popescu (born 27 June 1949) is a Romanian former water polo player. He competed at the 1972 Summer Olympics, the 1976 Summer Olympics and the 1980 Summer Olympics.

== See also ==
- Romania men's Olympic water polo team records and statistics
