= Florin Slăvei =

Romanian water polo player

Personal information
- Nationality: Romanian
- Born: 15 February 1951 Bucharest, Romania
- Died: 1995 Constanța, Romania

Sport
- Sport: Water polo

Florin Slăvei (15 February 1951 – 1995) was a Romanian water polo player. He competed at the 1976 Summer Olympics and the 1980 Summer Olympics.

== See also ==
- Romania men's Olympic water polo team records and statistics
- List of men's Olympic water polo tournament goalkeepers
