= Petar Tomasevic =

French water polo player (born 1989)

Personal information
- Born: 2 January 1989 (age 37) Kotor, Montenegro
- Height: 192 cm (6 ft 4 in)
- Weight: 102 kg (225 lb)

Sport
- Country: France
- Sport: Water polo
- Club: Olympic Nice

Petar Tomasevic (born 2 January 1989) is a former water polo player from France.

He was part of the French team at the 2016 Summer Olympics, where the team was eliminated in the group stages.

He is married and has a daughter.
