= Alexandru Matei (footballer) =

Romanian footballer (born 2008)

Personal information
- Full name: Alexandru Marian Matei
- Date of birth: 25 January 2008 (age 18)
- Place of birth: Baia de Aramă, Romania
- Height: 1.78 m (5 ft 10 in)
- Position: Midfielder

Team information
- Current team: UTA Arad
- Number: 23

Youth career
- –2018: ACS Poli Timișoara
- 2018–2019: Ghiroda
- 2019–2024: ASU Politehnica Timișoara
- 2024–: UTA Arad

Senior career*
Years	Team	Apps	(Gls)
2025–	UTA Arad	2	(0)
- * Club domestic league appearances and goals as of 8 December 2025

Alexandru Marian Matei (born 25 January 2008) is a Romanian professional footballer who plays as a midfielder for Liga I club UTA Arad.
