= Romania at the 2019 World Aquatics Championships =

- Flag of Romania
- FINA code: ROU
- National federation: Romanian Federation of Swimming and Modern Pentathlon
- Website: frnpm.ro (in Romanian)

World Aquatics Championships appearances
- 1973; 1975; 1978; 1982; 1986; 1991; 1994; 1998; 2001; 2003; 2005; 2007; 2009; 2011; 2013; 2015; 2017; 2019; 2022; 2023; 2024

Romania competed at the 2019 World Aquatics Championships in Gwangju, South Korea from 12 to 28 July.

== Diving ==
Romania entered four divers.

Men

Athlete	Event	Preliminaries		Semifinals		Final	
Athlete	Event	Points	Rank	Points	Rank	Points	Rank
Cozma Catalin	10 m platform	287.95	42	did not advance			
Constantin Popovici	10 m platform	292.70	41	did not advance			

Women

Athlete	Event	Preliminaries		Semifinals		Final	
Athlete	Event	Points	Rank	Points	Rank	Points	Rank
Nicoleta Muscalu	10 m platform	239.65	28	did not advance			
Antonia Pavel	10 m platform	273.90	19	did not advance			
Nicoleta Muscalu; Antonia Pavel	Synchronized 10 m platform	258.78	11 Q	—		260.82	11

== High diving ==
Romania qualified two male high divers.

Athlete	Event	Points	Rank
Cătălin Preda	Men's high diving	234.40	14

== Swimming ==
Romania entered four swimmers.

Men

Athlete	Event	Heat		Semifinal		Final	
Athlete	Event	Time	Rank	Time	Rank	Time	Rank
Robert Glință	50 m backstroke	25.00	=9 Q	24.53	2 Q	24.67	7
Robert Glință	100 m backstroke	53.64	7 Q	53.40	8 Q	54.22	8
Daniel Martin	100 m backstroke	53.65	8 Q	53.71	=12	did not advance	
Daniel Martin	200 m backstroke	1:57.76	11 Q	1:57.66	10	did not advance	
Daniel Martin	100 m butterfly	53.15	27	did not advance			
George-Adrian Ratiu	50 m freestyle	22.88	48	did not advance			
George-Adrian Ratiu	50 m butterfly	24.48	43	did not advance			

Women

Athlete	Event	Heat		Semifinal		Final	
Athlete	Event	Time	Rank	Time	Rank	Time	Rank
Claudia Gadea	200 m individual medley	2:19.03	28	did not advance			
Claudia Gadea	400 m individual medley	5:01.11	26	—		did not advance	
