= Alin Artimon (swimmer) =

Romanian swimmer (born 1992)

Personal information
- Born: 19 February 1992 (age 34)

Sport
- Sport: Swimming

Alin Artimon (born 19 February 1992) is a Romanian swimmer. He competed in the men's 400 metre freestyle event at the 2017 World Aquatics Championships.
