= Bogdan Rath =

Romanian water polo player

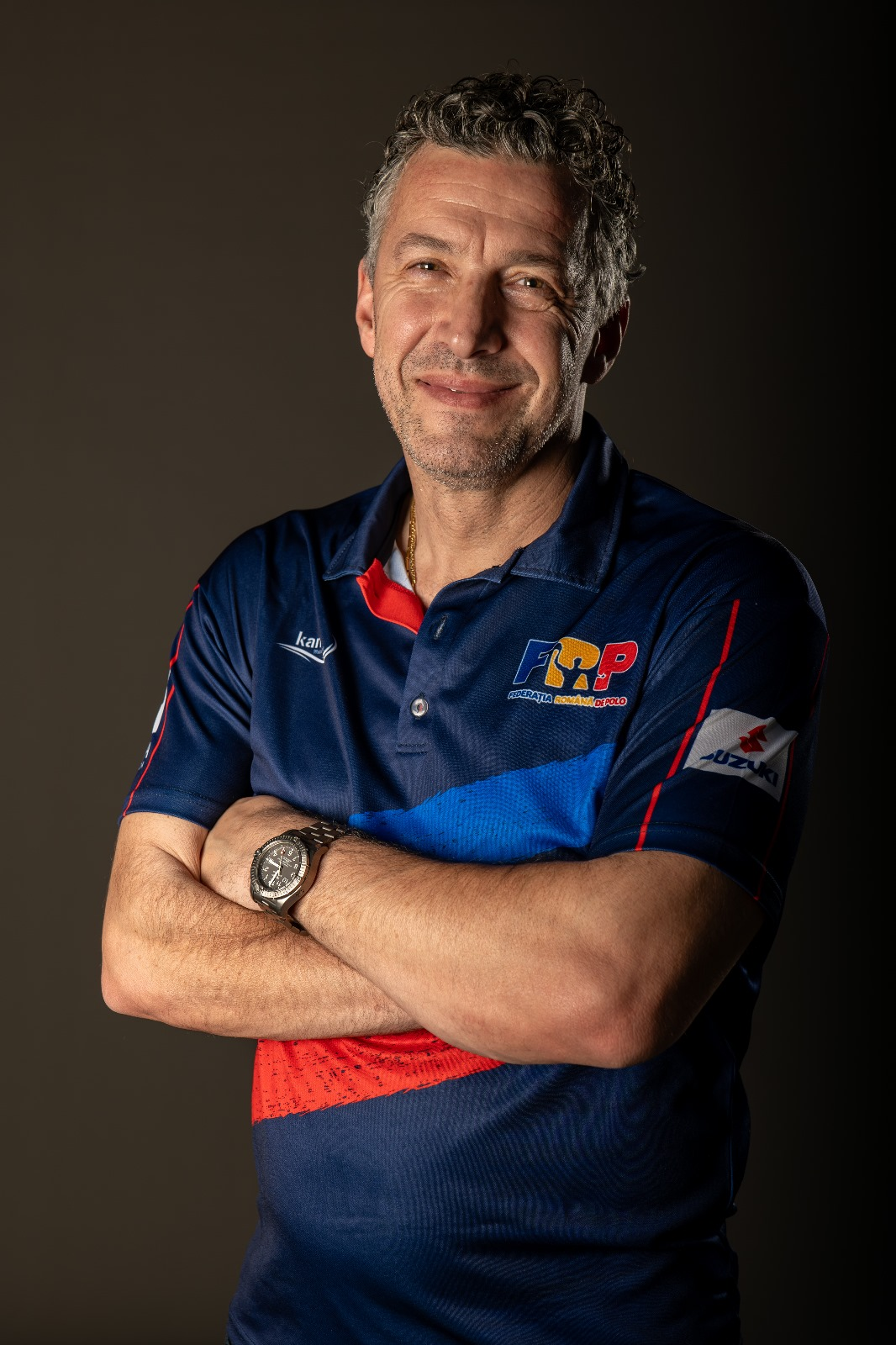

Personal information
- Born: 28 June 1972 (age 54) Bucharest, Romania

Sport
- Sport: Water polo
Medal record
Representing Italy
World Championships
Silver medal – second place	2003 Barcelona	Team competition
European Championships
Silver medal – second place	2001 Budapest	Team competition
Mediterranean Games
Silver medal – second place	2001 Tunis	Team competition
Silver medal – second place	2005 Almeria	Team competition

Bogdan Rath (born 28 June 1972) is a Romanian and later Italian water polo player who competed in the 1996 Summer Olympics (for Romania) and in the 2004 Summer Olympics (for Italy). In June 2022, he became the coach of the Romanian national polo team and the Steaua Bucharest club team.

Bogdan Rath is the most decorated Romanian water polo player of all time. He was a member of the Romanian national team, with whom he played 250 matches between 1991 and 1999, and later of the Italian national team, with whom he played 125 matches between 2001 and 2005. Since June 2022, he has been the head coach of the Romanian national water polo team and of the club team Steaua Bucharest.

== Playing career ==
Romania

He began playing water polo at the age of 8 and joined CSS 1 Bucharest in 1980, where he won two Romanian National Championship titles. As a junior, he was selected to represent Romania at the 1989 European Junior Championship.

At the age of 17, he made his debut in the Romanian First Division with Sportul Studențesc Bucharest in 1989. In 1991, he transferred to Steaua Bucharest, where he played until 1996.

Achievements with Romania

- 5× Romanian National Champion (Steaua Bucharest)
- 2× Romanian Cup Winner (Steaua Bucharest)
- 4th place at the 1993 European Championship in Sheffield
- Competed at the 1996 Olympic Games in Atlanta with the Romanian National Team

In 1996, he moved to Italy and joined Paguros Catania, where he won the COMEN Cup in Cairo in his first season.

Italy – Club Career

Paguros Catania (1996–1998)

- COMEN Cup Winner (1996)

Posillipo Napoli (1998–2003)

Major Achievements

- 2× Italian National Champion (2000, 2001)
- LEN Cup Winners’ Cup Champion (2003)
- LEN Euro League Bronze Medalist (1999, 2002)

Individual Recognition

- Selected to the World All-Star Challenge Team (1999, 2000)

Savona (2004–2005)

Major Achievements

- Italian National Champion (2005)
- LEN Trophy Winner (2005)
- LEN European Super Cup Runner-up (2005)

Leonessa Brescia (2006–2011)

Major Achievements

- LEN European Super Cup Winner (2006)
- Italian League A1 Silver Medalist (2008, 2010)

Ortigia Siracusa (2012)

- Concluded his playing career
- Malta National Championships

2009–2011

- League Champion
- Knock-Out Cup Winner
- President's Cup Winner
- Winter League Winner

=== San Ġiljan ASC ===
2012

- League Finalist
- Knock-Out Cup Finalist

Italy – National Team Career

After establishing himself in Italy, he became eligible to represent the Italian National Team and enjoyed significant success at the international level.

Major International Achievements

- World Championship Silver Medalist (Barcelona, 2003)
- European Championship Silver Medalist (Budapest, 2001)
- FINA World League Silver Medalist (New York, 2003)
- Mediterranean Games Silver Medalist (2001, 2005)

Other Major Results

- 8th place at the 2004 Olympic Games in Athens
- 4th place at the 2001 FINA World Cup in Belgrade
- 4th place at the 2001 World Championship in Fukuoka

Career Honours Summary

Club Honours

- 5× Romanian National Champion
- 2× Romanian Cup Winner
- 3× Italian National Champion
- 1× LEN Cup Winners’ Cup Champion
- 1× LEN Trophy Winner
- 1× LEN European Super Cup Winner
- 1× COMEN Cup Winner

International Honours

- Olympic Games Participant (Atlanta 1996, Athens 2004)
- World Championship Silver Medalist (2003)
- European Championship Silver Medalist (2001)
- FINA World League Silver Medalist (2003)
- 2× Mediterranean Games Silver Medalist (2001, 2005)

Individual Honours

- World All-Star Challenge Team Selection (1999, 2000)

== Coaching career ==
Coaching Career As coach of CSA Steaua Bucharest In the 2022–2023 season, he won the Romanian Cup held in Otopeni and the Romanian Super League. In the 2023–2024 season, he won the Romanian Cup held in Oradea and the Romanian Super League. In both seasons, he was named Best Coach. In the current season, he reached the top 8 in the LEN Trophy. In the 2024–2025 season, he won the Romanian Cup held in Târgu Mureș.

=== Coaching Career as Head Coach with the Romanian National Team ===
  - 10th place at the 2022 European Championship in Split
  - Qualified Romania for the 2024 European Championship in Dubrovnik
  - Qualified Romania, after 13 years, for the 2023 World Cup in Los Angeles, finishing 6th; this marked the first time Romania achieved a victory over Serbia in a major competition under his coaching
  - Qualified Romania, after more than 10 years, for the 2024 World Championship in Doha
  - Reached the top 8 at the 2024 European Championship in Zagreb
  - Qualified Romania for the 2026 European Championship in Belgrade
  - 10th place at the 2024 World Championship in Doha, a result that secured qualification for the 2024 Paris Olympic Games
  - Qualified Romania for the 2025 World Cup in Bucharest, finishing 10th
  - Qualified Romania for the 2025 World Championship in Singapore and the 2026 European Championship in Belgrade
  - At the 2026 European Championship in Belgrade, reaching the top 8, he achieved qualification for the 2027 World Championship in Budapest and the 2028 European Championship

=== Coaching Career in Malta ===
San Ġiljan Asc 2012–2014

- Assistant Coach, Senior Team
- Head Coach, U14 Team
- Head Coach, U17 Team
- Head Coach, U20 Team

=== Sirens ASC 2014–2016 ===
- Head Coach, Senior Team
- Head Coach, U17 Team
- Head Coach, U20 Team

=== Sliema ASC 2016–2017 ===
- Head Coach, Senior Team
- Head Coach, U20 Team

=== Valletta United WPC 2017–2019 ===
- Head Coach, Senior Team
