= Dimitri Goanță =

Romanian water polo player

Dimitri Goanta
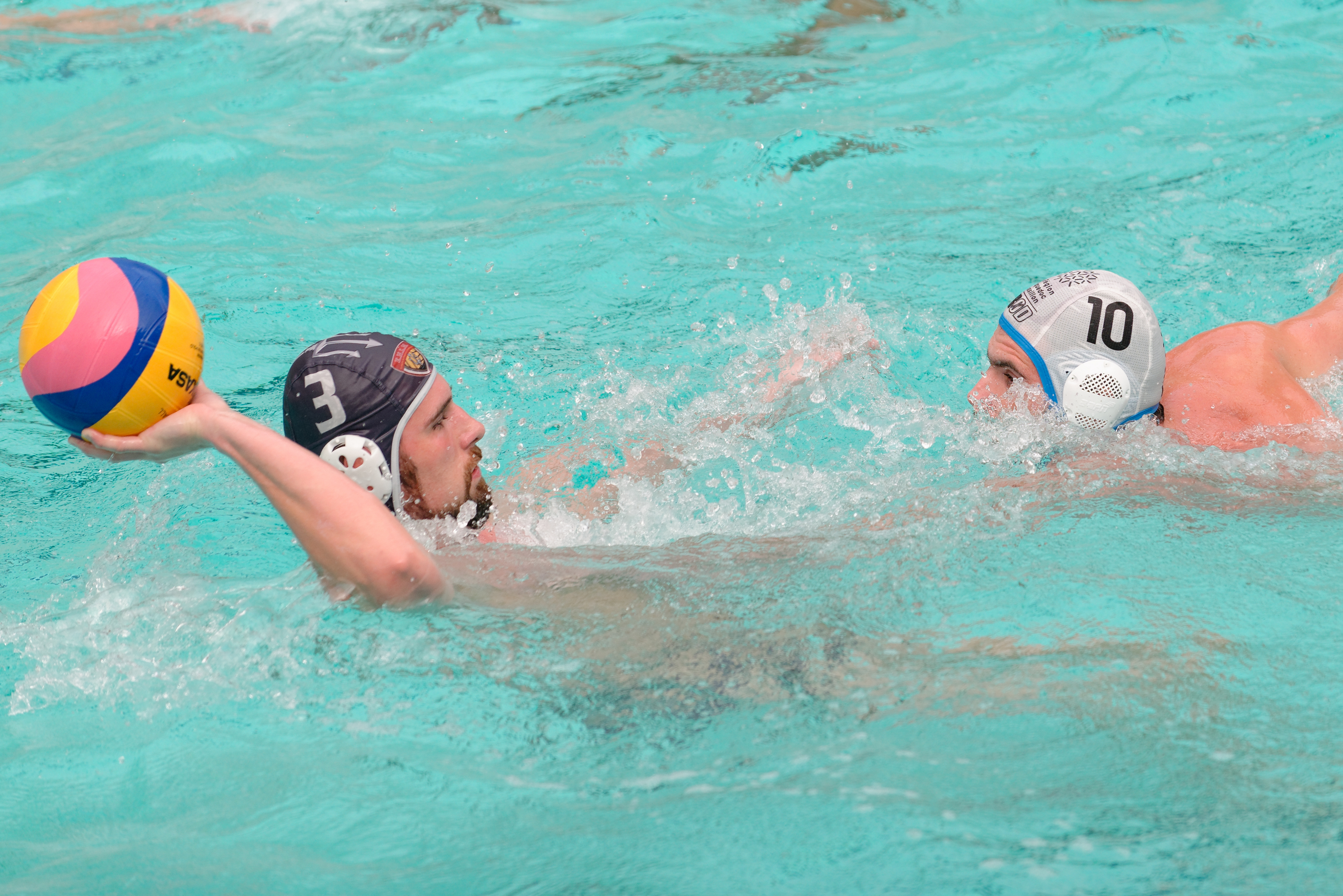

Personal information
- Nationality: Romanian
- Born: 17 July 1987 (age 39)
- Height: 202 cm (80 in)
- Weight: 113 kg (249 lb)

Sport
- Sport: Water polo
- Number: 9
National team
- Years: Team
- 2007-2016: Romania

Dimitri Goanță (born 17 July 1987, in Bucharest) is a Romanian water polo player. At the 2012 Summer Olympics, he competed for the Romania men's national water polo team in the men's event. He is 202 centimetres (6 ft 8 in) tall.
