= Dragoș Stoenescu =

Romanian water polo player

Personal information
- Full name: Dragoș Constantin Stoenescu
- Nickname: Citirica
- Nationality: Romanian
- Born: 30 May 1979 (age 47) Bucharest, Romania
- Height: 196 cm (77 in)
- Weight: 96 kg (212 lb)

Sport
- Sport: Water polo
- Handedness: right
- Position: Goalkeeper
- Number: 1
National team
- Years: Team
- 2003-2016: Romania

Dragoș Constantin Stoenescu (born 30 May 1979) is a Romanian water polo player. At the 2012 Summer Olympics, he competed for the Romania men's national water polo team in the men's event. He also competed at the 2011 World Aquatics Championships.

== See also ==
- Romania men's Olympic water polo team records and statistics
- List of men's Olympic water polo tournament goalkeepers
