= Mihnea Chioveanu =

Romanian water polo player

Personal information
- Nationality: Romanian
- Born: 21 August 1987 (age 39)
- Height: 198 cm (78 in)
- Weight: 115 kg (254 lb)

Sport
- Sport: Water polo
- Number: 8

Senior clubs
- Years: Team
- –: CSU Oradea
National team
- Years: Team
- 2012-2016: Romania

Mihnea Chioveanu (born August 21, 1987 in Bucharest) is a Romanian water polo player. At the 2012 Summer Olympics, he competed for the Romania men's national water polo team in the men's event. He is 6 ft 6 inches tall.
