= Mihai Drăgușin =

Romanian water polo player

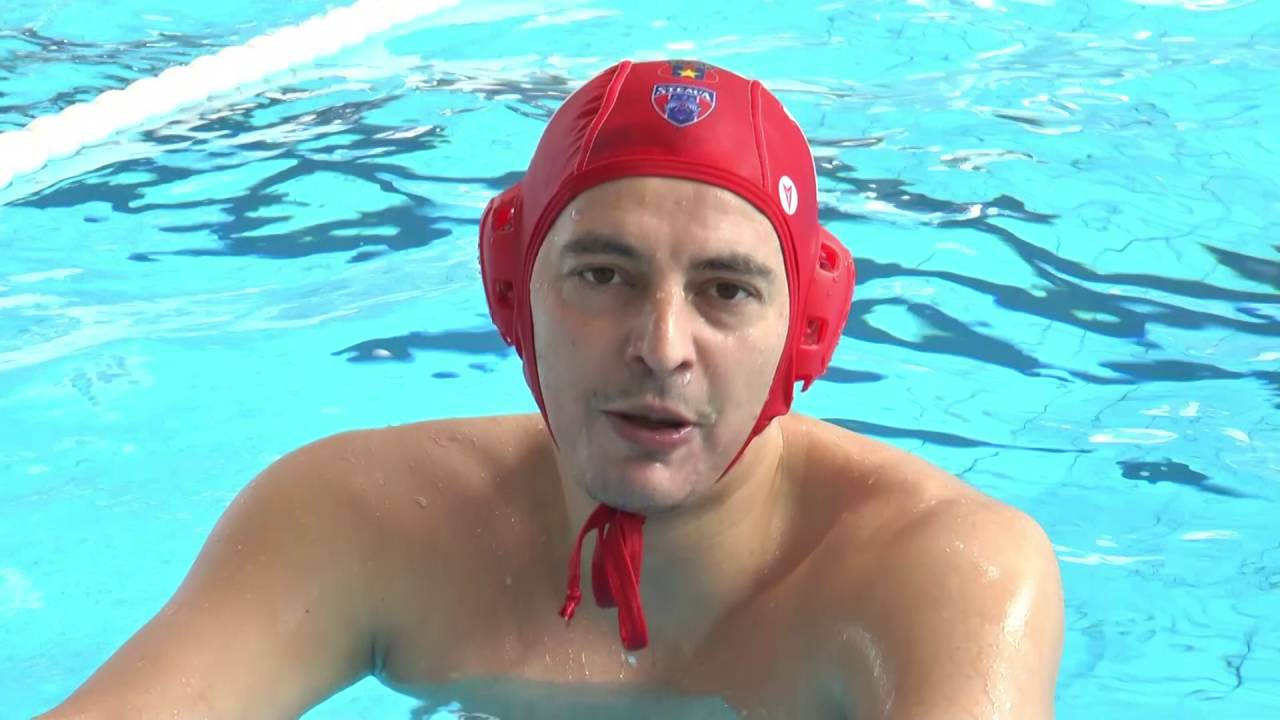

Personal information
- Full name: Eduard Mihai Drăgușin
- Nationality: Romanian
- Born: 5 January 1984 (age 42)
- Height: 188 cm (74 in)
- Weight: 85 kg (187 lb)

Sport
- Sport: Water polo
- Handedness: Right
- Position: Goalkeeper
- Number: 13
National team
- Years: Team
- 2012–2014: Romania

Eduard Mihai Drăgușin (born 5 January 1984) is a Romanian water polo goalkeeper. At the 2012 Summer Olympics, he competed for the Romania men's national water polo team in the men's event. He also competed at the 2011 World Aquatics Championships. He is 6 ft 2 inches tall.

== See also ==
- Romania men's Olympic water polo team records and statistics
- List of men's Olympic water polo tournament goalkeepers
