= Alexandru Matei (water polo) =

Romanian water polo player

Personal information
- Full name: Alexandru Barabas Matei Guiman
- Nationality: Romanian
- Born: 31 December 1980 (age 45) Bucharest, Romania
- Height: 195 cm (77 in)
- Weight: 95 kg (209 lb)

Sport
- Sport: Water polo
- Number: 7
National team
- Years: Team
- 2011-2014: Romania

Alexandru Barabas Matei Guiman (born 1980) is a Romanian water polo player. At the 2012 Summer Olympics, he competed for the Romania men's national water polo team in the men's event. He is 6 ft 3 inches tall.

== See also ==
- Romania men's Olympic water polo team records and statistics
