= Nicolae Diaconu =

Romanian water polo player

Personal information
- Full name: Nicolae Virgil Diaconu
- Nationality: Romanian
- Born: 4 September 1980 (age 46) Oradea, Romania
- Height: 180 cm (71 in)
- Weight: 88 kg (194 lb)

Sport
- Sport: Water polo
- Number: 4
National team
- Years: Team
- 2011-2014: Romania

Nicolae Virgil Diaconu (born 4 September 1980) is a Romanian water polo player. At the 2012 Summer Olympics, he competed for the Romania men's national water polo team in the men's event. He is 5 ft 11 inches tall.
