= Alexandru Ghiban =

Romanian water polo player

Personal information
- Full name: Alexandru Andrei Ghiban
- Nationality: Romanian
- Born: 12 October 1986 (age 40)
- Height: 196 cm (77 in)
- Weight: 96 kg (212 lb)

Sport
- Sport: Water polo
- Number: 11
National team
- Years: Team
- 2006-2016: Romania

Alexandru Andrei Ghiban (born 12 October 1986 in Mizil) is a Romanian water polo player. At the 2012 Summer Olympics, he competed for the Romania men's national water polo team in the men's event. He is 6 ft 5 inches tall.
