= Romania men's national water polo team =

Men's national water polo team representing Romania

Romania
- FINA code: ROU
- Association: Romanian Water Polo Federation
- Confederation: LEN (Europe)
- Head coach: Bogdan Rath
- Asst coach: George-Alexandru Deacu
- Captain: Marius Țic

FINA ranking (since 2008)
- Current: 17 (as of 9 August 2021)
- Highest: 10 (2012)

Olympic Games (team statistics)
- Appearances: 10 (first in 1952)
- Best result: 4th place (1976)

World Championship
- Appearances: 13 (first in 1973)
- Best result: 5th place (1975)

World Cup
- Appearances: 5 (first in 1979)
- Best result: 5th place (2010)

World League
- Appearances: 14 (first in 2005)
- Best result: 6th place (2007)

European Championship
- Appearances: 27 (first in 1954)
- Best result: 4th place (1993, 2006)

Media
- Website: frpolo.ro

The Romania men's national water polo team is the representative for Romania in international men's water polo.

== Results ==
=== Olympic Games ===
- 1952 – 17th place
- 1956 – 8th place
- 1960 – 5th place
- 1964 – 5th place
- 1972 – 8th place
- 1976 – 4th place
- 1980 – 9th place
- 1996 – 11th place
- 2012 – 10th place
- 2024 – 12th place

=== World Championship ===
- 1973 – 7th place
- 1975 – 5th place
- 1978 – 6th place
- 1991 – 9th place
- 1994 – 13th place
- 2003 – 12th place
- 2005 – 6th place
- 2007 – 11th place
- 2009 – 7th place
- 2011 – 12th place
- 2013 – 13th place
- 2024 – 10th place
- 2025 – 10th place

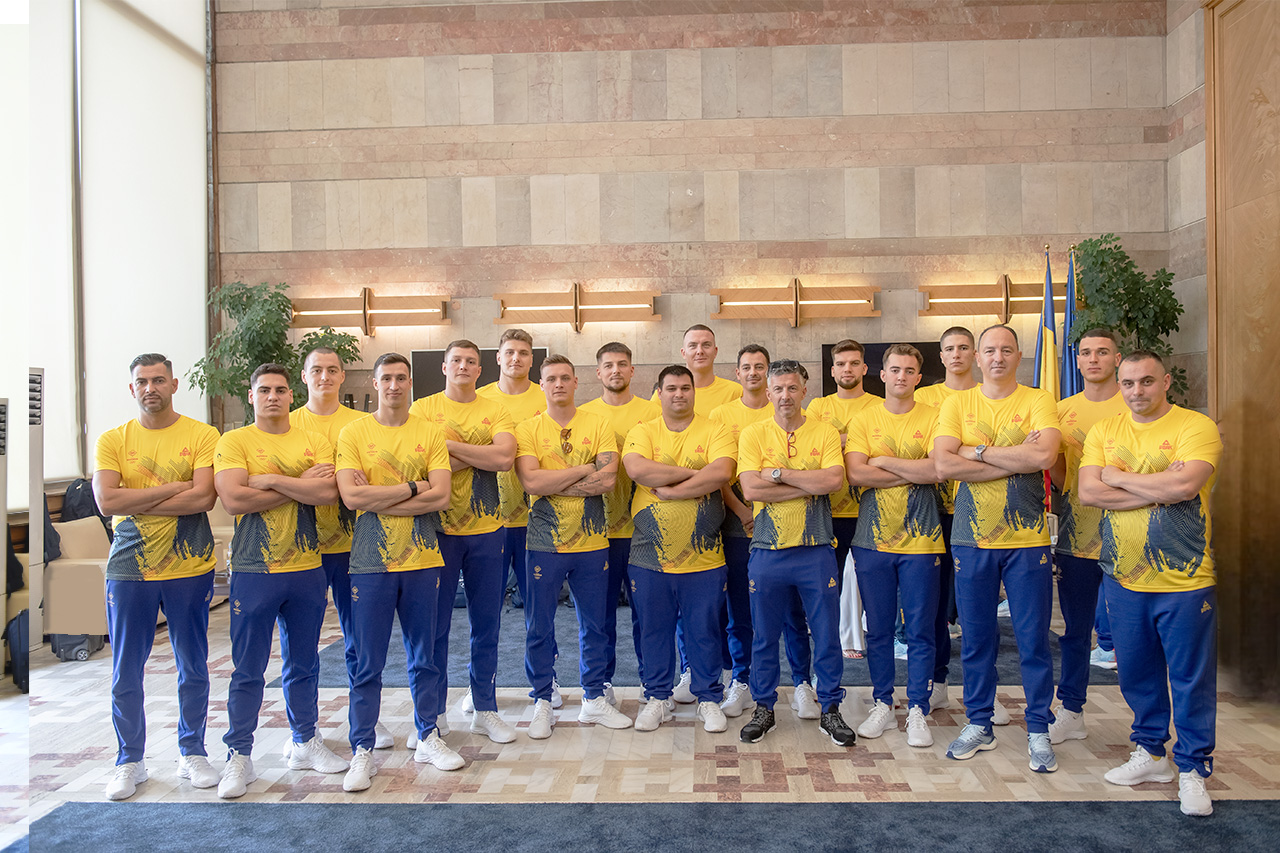
Romania Water Polo National Team - Olympic Games 2024

=== World Cup ===
- 1979 – 7th place
- 1991 – 6th place
- 2006 – 6th place
- 2010 – 5th place
- 2023 – 6th place

=== World League ===
- 2005 – 12th place
- 2006 – 11th place
- 2007 – 6th place
- 2008 – 17th place
- 2009 – 16th place
- 2010 – 14th place
- 2011 – 9th place
- 2012 – 10th place
- 2013 – Preliminary round
- 2014 – Preliminary round
- 2015 – Preliminary round
- 2016 – Preliminary round
- 2017 – Preliminary round
- 2018 – Preliminary round

=== European Championship ===
- 1954 – 10th place
- 1962 – 5th place
- 1966 – 6th place
- 1970 – 6th place
- 1974 – 6th place
- 1977 – 7th place
- 1981 – 7th place
- 1983 – 8th place
- 1987 – 7th place
- 1989 – 5th place
- 1991 – 8th place
- 1993 – 4th place
- 1995 – 11th place
- 1999 – 9th place
- 2001 – 11th place
- 2003 – 10th place
- 2006 – 4th place
- 2008 – 9th place
- 2010 – 7th place
- 2012 – 8th place
- 2014 – 8th place
- 2016 – 10th place
- 2018 – 11th place
- 2020 – 11th place
- 2022 – 10th place
- 2024 – 8th place
- 2026 – 8th place

== Team ==
=== Current squad ===
Roster for the 2026 Men's European Water Polo Championship.

Head coach: Bogdan Rath

| Name | Date of birth | Pos. | Club |
|---|---|---|---|
| Marius Florin Tic (C) | 9 September 1996 (age 29) | GK | (Romania) CSA Steaua București |
| Francesco Iudean | 28 September 2001 (age 24) | DF | (Romania) CSA Steaua București |
| Matei Ioan Lutescu | 5 June 2002 (age 23) | DF | (Romania) CS Dinamo București |
| Tudor-Andrei Fulea | 13 March 1997 (age 28) | W | (Romania) CSA Steaua București |
| Andrei-Radu Neamtu | 6 April 2004 (age 21) | W | (Romania) CSA Steaua București |
| Andrei Prioteasa | 3 April 1996 (age 29) | W | (Romania) CS Dinamo București |
| Andrei Tepelus | 9 February 2005 (age 21) | W | (Romania) CSA Steaua București |
| Nicolae Oanță | 14 August 1990 (age 35) | DF | (Romania) CSA Steaua București |
| Alexandru Gheorghe | 24 August 2002 (age 23) | CF | (United States) Stanford |
| Vlad-Luca Georgescu | 31 March 1999 (age 26) | W | (Romania) CSA Steaua București |
| David Belenyesi | 21 April 2003 (age 22) | W | (Romania) CSM Oradea |
| Levente Vancsik | 12 July 1994 (age 31) | CF | (Romania) CSM Oradea |
| Mihai Drăgușin | 5 January 1984 (age 42) | GK | (Romania) CSA Steaua București |
| David-Joan Bota | 2 June 1999 (age 26) | CF | (Romania) CSA Steaua București |
| Luncan Darian | 20 September 2002 (age 23) | DF | (Romania) CSM Oradea |

=== Notable players ===
- Vlad Hagiu
- Nicolae Firoiu
- Andrei Iosep
- Cosmin Radu
- Bogdan Rath (later Italy)

== See also ==
- Romania men's Olympic water polo team records and statistics
