= Serbia at the Olympics =

- IOC code: SRB
- NOC: Olympic Committee of Serbia
- Website: www.oks.org.rs (in Serbian)
- Medals Ranked 64th: Gold 9 Silver 8 Bronze 11 Total 28

Summer appearances
- 1912; 1920–2004; 2008; 2012; 2016; 2020; 2024

Winter appearances
- 2010; 2014; 2018; 2022; 2026

Other related appearances
- Yugoslavia (1920–1992 W); Independent Olympic Participants (1992 S); Serbia and Montenegro (1996–2006)

Serbia first participated at the Olympic Games in 1912 as the Kingdom of Serbia. The country returned to the Olympics as an independent team after ninety-six years at the 2008 Summer Olympics.

== History ==
Despite not participating at the first Olympic Games in 1896 in Athens, Serbian King Aleksandar Obrenović attended the Games at the invitation of Greek King George I. At these Games Momčilo Tapavica (born in today's Serbian province Vojvodina), who competed for Kingdom of Hungary, became the first athlete from today's territory of Serbia and the first ethnic Serb to win an Olympic medal, bronze in tennis.

The Serbian Olympic Club was established on February 23, 1910. Major Svetomir Đukić is considered the founder of the Olympic movement in Serbia. In 1912, the Club changed its name to the Olympic Committee of Serbia and that year it was recognized by the International Olympic Committee.

From the 1920 Summer Olympics to the 1992 Winter Olympics, Serbian athletes participated as part of the Yugoslavian team. At the 1992 Summer Olympics, they participated as Independent Olympic Participants as their nation was under United Nations sanctions. The continuing sanctions meant that no Serbian athletes competed at the 1994 Winter Olympics. Sanctions were mostly lifted in 1995. From the 1996 Summer Olympics to the 2006 Winter Olympics, Serbian athletes participated as part of the Serbia and Montenegro team.

Seven-time Olympian shooter and 1988 gold medalist Jasna Šekarić competed under four different banners during her twenty-four-year Olympic career. She started under the flag of Yugoslavia in 1988, then she competed as an Independent Participant in 1992, under the flag of Serbia and Montenegro from 1996 to 2004, and in 2008 and 2012 she represented Serbia.

Serbian former basketball player and administrator Borislav Stanković was the Secretary General of FIBA from 1976 to 2002, and a member of the International Olympic Committee. As Secretary General, he pushed for a change in FIBA's rules to allow players from the National Basketball Association (NBA) to compete at the Olympics. Prior to the 1992 Summer Olympics in Barcelona, only professionals in leagues other than the NBA were allowed to compete.

== Timeline of participation ==
Olympic Year/s	Teams	
1912	Kingdom of Serbia	
1920–1936	Kingdom of Yugoslavia	
1948–1992 W	Yugoslavia	
1992 S	Independent Olympic Participants	
1994		
1996–2006	FR Yugoslavia/ Serbia and Montenegro	
2008–2010	Serbia	
2012–2014	Serbia	
2016–present	Serbia	Kosovo

== Medal tables ==
=== Medals by Summer Games ===
Games	Athletes	Gold	Silver	Bronze	Total	Rank
(Sweden) 1912 Stockholm	3	0	0	0	0	–
1920–1988	as part of Yugoslavia					
(Spain) 1992 Barcelona	as part of the Independent Olympic Participants					
1996–2004	as part of Serbia and Montenegro					
(China) 2008 Beijing	92	0	1	2	3	61
(United Kingdom) 2012 London	116	1	1	2	4	43
(Brazil) 2016 Rio de Janeiro	103	2	4	2	8	32
(Japan) 2020 Tokyo	87	3	1	4	8	28
(France) 2024 Paris	113	3	1	1	5	27
(United States) 2028 Los Angeles	future event					
(Australia) 2032 Brisbane	future event					
Total		9	8	11	28	64

=== Medals by Winter Games ===
Games	Athletes	Gold	Silver	Bronze	Total	Rank
1924–1992	as part of Yugoslavia					
(Norway) 1994 Lillehammer	did not participate					
1998–2006	as part of Serbia and Montenegro					
(Canada) 2010 Vancouver	10	0	0	0	0	–
(Russia) 2014 Sochi	8	0	0	0	0	–
(South Korea) 2018 Pyeongchang	4	0	0	0	0	–
(China) 2022 Beijing	2	0	0	0	0	–
(Italy) 2026 Milano Cortina	3	0	0	0	0	–
(France) 2030 French Alps	future event					
(United States) 2034 Utah	future event					
Total		0	0	0	0	–

=== Medals by summer sport ===
Sport	Gold	Silver	Bronze	Total
Water polo	3	0	2	5
Taekwondo	2	2	1	5
Shooting	1	2	2	5
Tennis	1	0	1	2
Karate	1	0	0	1
Wrestling	1	0	0	1
Basketball	0	1	2	3
Volleyball	0	1	1	2
Canoeing	0	1	0	1
Swimming	0	1	0	1
3x3 basketball	0	0	1	1
Athletics	0	0	1	1
Totals (12 entries)	9	8	11	28

== List of medalists ==
Medal	Name(s)	Games	Sport	Event
Silver	Milorad Čavić	2008 Beijing	Swimming	Men's 100 m butterfly
Bronze	Novak Djokovic	2008 Beijing	Tennis	Men's singles
Bronze	Men's water polo team: Aleksandar Ćirić Filip Filipović Živko Gocić Branko Peković Duško Pijetlović Andrija Prlainović Nikola Rađen Aleksandar Šapić Dejan Savić Denis Šefik Slobodan Soro Vanja Udovičić Vladimir Vujasinović	2008 Beijing	Water polo	Men's tournament
Gold	Milica Mandić	2012 London	Taekwondo	Women's +67 kg
Silver	Ivana Maksimović	2012 London	Shooting	Women's 50 m rifle three positions
Bronze	Andrija Zlatić	2012 London	Shooting	Men's 10 m air pistol
Bronze	Men's water polo team: Milan Aleksić Filip Filipović Živko Gocić Dušan Mandić Stefan Mitrović Slobodan Nikić Duško Pijetlović Gojko Pijetlović Andrija Prlainović Nikola Rađen Slobodan Soro Aleksa Šaponjić Vanja Udovičić	2012 London	Water polo	Men's tournament
Gold	Davor Štefanek	2016 Rio de Janeiro	Wrestling	Men's Greco-Roman 66 kg
Gold	Men's water polo team: Milan Aleksić Miloš Ćuk Filip Filipović Živko Gocić Nikola Jakšić Dušan Mandić Branislav Mitrović Stefan Mitrović Slobodan Nikić Duško Pijetlović Gojko Pijetlović Andrija Prlainović Sava Ranđelović	2016 Rio de Janeiro	Water polo	Men's tournament
Silver	Tijana Bogdanović	2016 Rio de Janeiro	Taekwondo	Women's 49 kg
Silver	Marko Tomićević; Milenko Zorić	2016 Rio de Janeiro	Canoeing	Men's K-2 1000 m
Silver	Women's volleyball team: Tijana Bošković Jovana Brakočević Bianka Buša Tijana Malešević Brankica Mihajlović Jelena Nikolić Maja Ognjenović Silvija Popović Milena Rašić Jovana Stevanović Stefana Veljković Bojana Živković	2016 Rio de Janeiro	Volleyball	Women's tournament
Silver	Men's basketball team: Stefan Birčević Bogdan Bogdanović Nikola Jokić Stefan Jović Nikola Kalinić Milan Mačvan Stefan Marković Nemanja Nedović Miroslav Raduljica Marko Simonović Vladimir Štimac Miloš Teodosić	2016 Rio de Janeiro	Basketball	Men's tournament
Bronze	Ivana Španović	2016 Rio de Janeiro	Athletics	Women's long jump
Bronze	Women's basketball team: Dajana Butulija Aleksandra Crvendakić Saša Čađo Ana Dabović Milica Dabović Nevena Jovanović Sara Krnjić Jelena Milovanović Danielle Page Sonja Petrović Tamara Radočaj Dragana Stanković	2016 Rio de Janeiro	Basketball	Women's tournament
Gold	Milica Mandić	2020 Tokyo	Taekwondo	Women's +67 kg
Gold	Jovana Preković	2020 Tokyo	Karate	Women's 61 kg
Gold	Men's water polo team: Gojko Pijetlović Dušan Mandić Nikola Dedović Sava Ranđelović Strahinja Rašović Duško Pijetlović Đorđe Lazić Milan Aleksić Nikola Jakšić Filip Filipović Andrija Prlainović Stefan Mitrović Branislav Mitrović	2020 Tokyo	Water polo	Men's tournament
Silver	Damir Mikec	2020 Tokyo	Shooting	Men's 10 metre air pistol
Bronze	Tijana Bogdanović	2020 Tokyo	Taekwondo	Women's 49 kg
Bronze	Milenko Sebić	2020 Tokyo	Shooting	Men's 50 metre rifle three positions
Bronze	Women's volleyball team: Bianka Buša Mina Popović Slađana Mirković Brankica Mihajlović Maja Ognjenović Ana Bjelica Maja Aleksić Milena Rašić Silvija Popović Tijana Bošković Bojana Milenković Jelena Blagojević	2020 Tokyo	Volleyball	Women's tournament
Bronze	Men's 3x3 basketball team: Dušan Domović Bulut Dejan Majstorović Aleksandar Ratkov Mihailo Vasić	2020 Tokyo	3x3 basketball	Men's tournament
Gold	Zorana Arunović; Damir Mikec	2024 Paris	Shooting	Mixed 10 metre air pistol team
Gold	Novak Djokovic	2024 Paris	Tennis	Men's singles
Gold	Men's water polo team: Radoslav Filipović Dušan Mandić Strahinja Rašović Sava Ranđelović Miloš Ćuk Nikola Dedović Radomir Drašović Nikola Jakšić Nemanja Ubović Nemanja Vico Petar Jakšić Viktor Rašović Vladimir Mišović	2024 Paris	Water polo	Men's tournament
Silver	Aleksandra Perišić	2024 Paris	Taekwondo	Women's 67 kg
Bronze	Men's basketball team: Uroš Plavšić Filip Petrušev Nikola Jović Bogdan Bogdanović Vanja Marinković Ognjen Dobrić Nikola Jokić Vasilije Micić Marko Gudurić Dejan Davidovac; Aleksa Avramović Nikola Milutinov	2024 Paris	Basketball	Men's basketball tournament

== Stripped Olympic medals ==
Medal	Name(s)	Games	Sport	Event	Ref
Bronze	Zurabi Datunashvili	2020 Tokyo	Wrestling	Men's Greco-Roman 87 kg	

== Multiple medal winners ==
This is a list of people who have won two or more Olympic medals, who represented Serbia as an independent country at least once.

Athlete	Sport	Gender	Years	Games	1st place, gold medalist(s)	2nd place, silver medalist(s)	3rd place, bronze medalist(s)	Total
**Dušan Mandić**	Water polo	M	2012–2024	Summer	3	0	1	4
**Nikola Jakšić**	Water polo	M	2016–2024	Summer	3	0	0	3
**Sava Ranđelović**	Water polo	M	2016–2024	Summer	3	0	0	3
Filip Filipović	Water polo	M	2008–2020	Summer	2	0	2	4
Duško Pijetlović	Water polo	M	2008–2020	Summer	2	0	2	4
Andrija Prlainović	Water polo	M	2008–2020	Summer	2	0	2	4
Milan Aleksić	Water polo	M	2012–2020	Summer	2	0	1	3
Stefan Mitrović	Water polo	M	2012–2020	Summer	2	0	1	3
Gojko Pijetlović	Water polo	M	2012–2020	Summer	2	0	1	3
**Miloš Ćuk**	Water polo	M	2016–2024	Summer	2	0	0	2
**Nikola Dedović**	Water polo	M	2020–2024	Summer	2	0	0	2
Milica Mandić	Taekwondo	W	2012–2020	Summer	2	0	0	2
Branislav Mitrović	Water polo	M	2016–2020	Summer	2	0	0	2
**Strahinja Rašović**	Water polo	M	2020–2024	Summer	2	0	0	2
Jasna Šekarić	Shooting	W	1988–2004	Summer	1	3	1	5
Slobodan Nikić	Water polo	M	2004–2016	Summer	1	1	1	3
**Damir Mikec**	Shooting	M	2008–2024	Summer	1	1	0	2
Živko Gocić	Water polo	M	2008–2016	Summer	1	0	2	3
**Novak Djokovic**	Tennis	M	2008–2024	Summer	1	0	1	2
Andrija Gerić	Volleyball	M	1996–2000	Summer	1	0	1	2
Nikola Grbić	Volleyball	M	1996–2000	Summer	1	0	1	2
Aleksandar Ćirić	Water polo	M	2000–2008	Summer	0	1	2	3
Aleksandar Šapić	Water polo	M	2000–2008	Summer	0	1	2	3
Dejan Savić	Water polo	M	2000–2008	Summer	0	1	2	3
Vanja Udovičić	Water polo	M	2004–2012	Summer	0	1	2	3
Vladimir Vujasinović	Water polo	M	2000–2008	Summer	0	1	2	3
**Bogdan Bogdanović**	Basketball	M	2016–2024	Summer	0	1	1	2
Tijana Bogdanović	Taekwondo	W	2016–2020	Summer	0	1	1	2
**Tijana Bošković**	Volleyball	W	2016–2024	Summer	0	1	1	2
**Bianka Buša**	Volleyball	W	2016–2024	Summer	0	1	1	2
**Nikola Jokić**	Basketball	M	2016–2024	Summer	0	1	1	2
Brankica Mihajlović	Volleyball	W	2016–2020	Summer	0	1	1	2
**Maja Ognjenović**	Volleyball	W	2016–2024	Summer	0	1	1	2
**Silvija Popović**	Volleyball	W	2016–2024	Summer	0	1	1	2
Milena Rašić	Volleyball	W	2016–2020	Summer	0	1	1	2
Denis Šefik	Water polo	M	2004–2008	Summer	0	1	1	2
Nikola Rađen	Water polo	M	2008–2012	Summer	0	0	2	2
Slobodan Soro	Water polo	M	2008–2012	Summer	0	0	2	2

- **People in bold** are still active competitors
- Olympics in italic are medals won for the predecessor countries

=== Medal winners as medal winning coach ===
Athlete	Sport	Gender	Games	As participant					As head coach				
Athlete	Sport	Gender	Games	Years	1st place, gold medalist(s)	2nd place, silver medalist(s)	3rd place, bronze medalist(s)	Total	Years	1st place, gold medalist(s)	2nd place, silver medalist(s)	3rd place, bronze medalist(s)	Total
Dejan Savić	Water polo	M	Summer	2000–2008	0	1	2	3	2016–2020	2	0	0	2
Goran Maksimović	Shooting	M	Summer	1988	1	0	0	1	2004–2012	0	2	1	3
Aleksandar Đorđević	Basketball	M	Summer	1996	0	1	0	1	2016	0	1	0	1

== Predecessor countries ==
The Olympic Committee of Serbia, created in 1910 and recognized in 1912, is deemed the direct successor to both the Yugoslav Olympic Committee and the Olympic Committee of Serbia and Montenegro by the IOC. In the period from 1920 to 2006, athletes representing these defunct countries won a total of 99 medals: 95 at the Summer Games and 4 at the Winter Games.

Country	№ Summer	Gold	Silver	Bronze	Total	№ Winter	Gold	Silver	Bronze	Total	№ Games	Gold	Silver	Bronze	Combined Total
Kingdom of Yugoslavia	5	3	2	3	8	3	0	0	0	0	8	3	2	3	8
(Socialist Federal Republic of Yugoslavia) SFR Yugoslavia	11	23	27	25	75	10	0	3	1	4	21	23	30	26	79
Independent Olympic Participants	1	0	1	2	3	0	0	0	0	0	1	0	1	2	3
Serbia and Montenegro	3	2	4	3	9	3	0	0	0	0	6	2	4	3	9
Total	20	28	34	33	95	16	0	3	1	4	36	28	37	34	99

== See also ==
- List of flag bearers for Serbia at the Olympics
- Serbia at the Paralympics
- List of Yugoslav Olympic medalists
