= 2024–25 Serbian Water Polo Super League =

2024-25 Serbian Water Polo Super League
- Sport: Water Polo
- Defending champions: VK Novi Beograd (2023-24)
- Teams: 12
- Champions: VK Radnički Kragujevac
- Finals venue: SC Park, Kragujevac; SRC 11. April, Belgrade

Seasons
- ← 2023-24

The 2024-25 Serbian Water polo Super League was the 18th season of the Serbian Water Polo Super League. The tournament was in a knockout cup format with teams being seeded based on their position in the Regional Water Polo League. VK Radnički Kragujevac won their second Super League title after defeating VK Novi Beograd, the defending champions, in a best of three final series.

== Teams ==
Locations of the teams participating in the 2024-25 season of the Serbian Water Polo Super League

The teams were seeded based on their ranking in the 2024-25 Regional Water Polo League

=== Seeding ===
Position	Team	Progressed to
1	VK Radnički Kragujevac	Play-Off
2	VK Novi Beograd	Play-Off
3	VK Šabac	Play-Off
4	VK Crvena Zvezda	Play-Off
5	VK Valis	Play-Off
6	VK Stari Grad	Play-Off
7	VK Partizan	Play-Off
8	VK NBG Vukovi	Play-Off
9	VK Vojvodina	9th place classification match
10	VK Zemun	9th place classification match
11	VK Nais	Play-Out
12	VK Proleter	Relegated to Prva A League

== Play-Off ==
Quarterfinals
1	Radnički	16	17
8	Vukovi	6	5
5	Crvena Zvezda	10	15
4	Valis	5	13
3	Novi Beograd	17	22
6	Partizan	10	13
7	Šabac	10	19
2	Stari Grad	8	13

Semifinals
Radnički	15	20
Crvena Zvezda	12	8
Novi Beograd	16	12
Šabac	11	11

Finals
Radnički	13	11	14
Novi Beograd	12	13	13
Third Place
Crvena Zvezda	10	8
Šabac	12	13
