= Miloš Ćuk =

Serbian water polo player

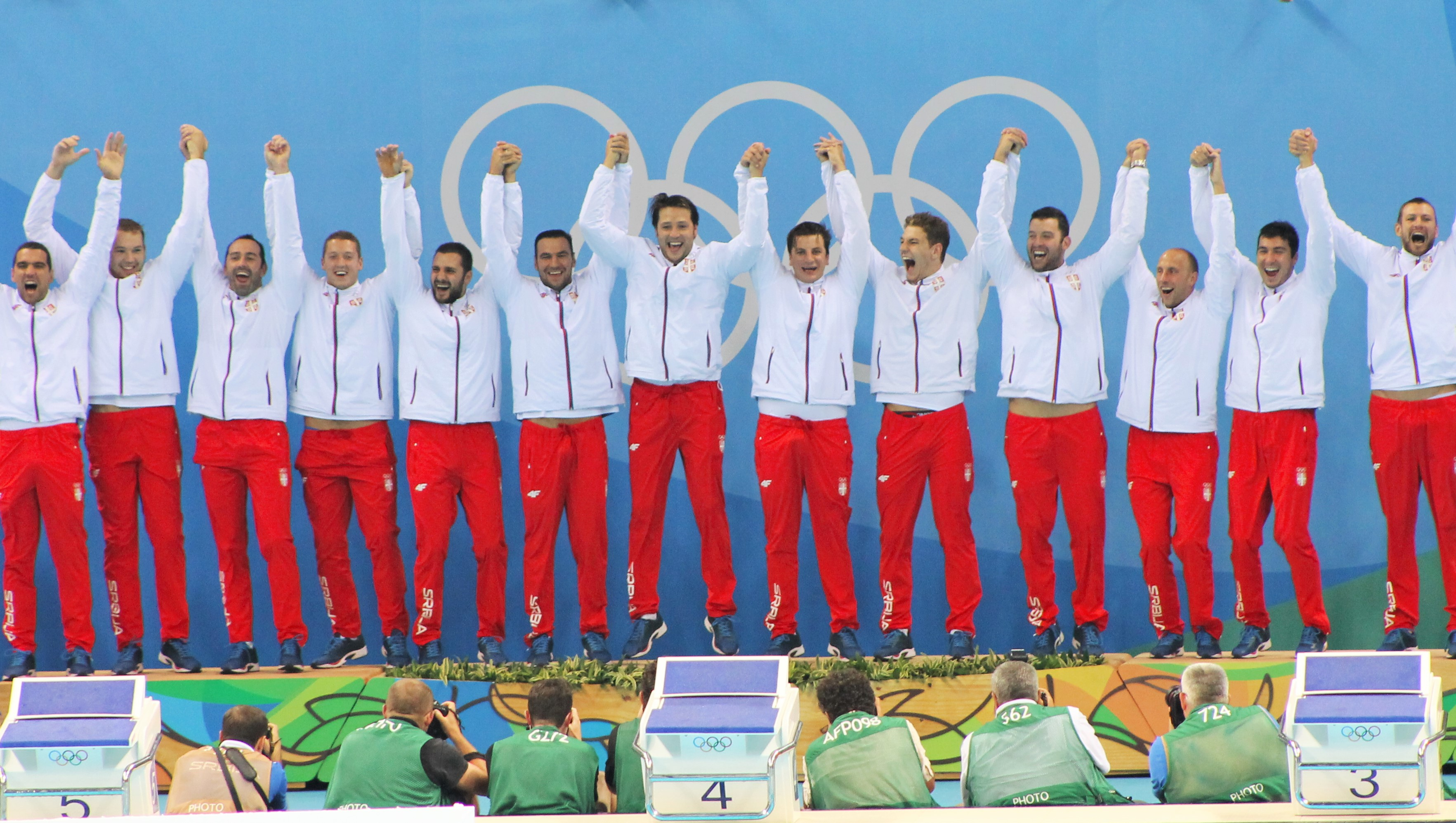

Personal information
- Nationality: Serbian
- Born: 21 December 1990 (age 35) Novi Sad, SR Serbia, SFR Yugoslavia
- Height: 1.91 m (6 ft 3 in)
- Weight: 91 kg (201 lb)

Sport
- Sport: Water polo

Senior clubs
- Years: Team
- 2007–2009: Vojvodina
- 2009–2014: Partizan
- 2014–2017: ZF-Eger
- 2017–2018: Szolnok
- 2018–2020: HAVK Mladost
- 2020–2021: VK Novi Beograd
- 2021–23: Radnički
- 2023-present: VK Novi Beograd
Medal record
Men's water polo
Representing Serbia
Olympic Games
| Gold medal – first place | 2016 Rio de Janeiro |
| Gold medal – first place | 2024 Paris | Team |
World Championship
| Gold medal – first place | 2015 Kazan |
| Silver medal – second place | 2011 Shanghai |
| Bronze medal – third place | 2017 Budapest |
European Championship
| Gold medal – first place | 2012 Eindhoven |
| Gold medal – first place | 2014 Budapest |
| Gold medal – first place | 2016 Belgrade |
| Gold medal – first place | 2018 Barcelona |
| Gold medal – first place | 2026 Belgrade |
FINA World League
| Gold medal – first place | 2011 Firenze |
| Gold medal – first place | 2013 Chelyabinsk |
| Gold medal – first place | 2014 Dubai |
| Gold medal – first place | 2015 Bergamo |
| Gold medal – first place | 2016 Huizhou |
| Gold medal – first place | 2017 Ruza |
| Gold medal – first place | 2019 Belgrade |
| Bronze medal – third place | 2009 Podgorica |
Mediterranean Games
| Gold medal – first place | 2018 Tarragona |
Universiade
| Bronze medal – third place | 2009 Belgrade |

Miloš Ćuk (Serbian Cyrillic: Милош Ћук; born 21 December 1990) is a Serbian water polo player. His most notable achievement with the Serbia national water polo team are the golden medal from the 2012 European Championship held in Eindhoven and the silver medal from the 2011 World Championship in Shanghai. In 2011, he won with Partizan Raiffeisen the National Championship and National Cup of Serbia, LEN Euroleague, LEN Supercup and Eurointer League.

== Club career ==
=== Partizan Raiffeisen ===
On 9 November Ćuk scored four goals in the second round of the Euroleague Group in the 10–10 tie against TEVA-Vasas-UNIQA. On 26 November he scored two goals in a 9–6 Euroleague third round win over ZF Eger in Belgrade. He scored a goal on 14 December in the fourth round of the Euroleague, in the 12–8 second defeat to ZF Eger. On 8 February Ćuk scored three goals for Partizan in the fifth round of the Euroleague Group in which his team won without much problem 9–5 against TEVA-Vasas-UNIQA. On 17 February Ćuk scored his first two goals of the Serbian National Championship season, in the third round of the "A League", in an easy 14–2 win against ŽAK. On 1 March Ćuk scored two goals against VK Vojvodina in a 10–9 win in the "A League" fourth round. On 3 March in the fifth round of the "A League", Ćuk scored three goals in a 9–4 home win against VK Beograd.

== National career ==
On 19 January, in the third game at the European Championships, Ćuk scored his first two goals of the tournament in a big and difficult victory against the defending European champions Croatia. The final result was 15–12 for his national team. On 21 January in the fourth match, Ćuk was on the scorers sheet with one goal for his national team in a routine victory against Romania 14–5. On 27 January Ćuk scored a goal in a semifinal 12–8 victory over Italy. On 29 January, Ćuk won the European Championship with his national team beating in the final Montenegro by 9–8. This was his first medal with the national team in European Championships.

== Honours ==
=== Club ===
VK Partizan

- National Championship of Serbia (3): 2009–10, 2010–11, 2011–12
- National Cup of Serbia (3): 2009–10, 2010–11, 2011–12
- LEN Champions League (1): 2010–11
- LEN Super Cup (1): 2011
- Eurointer League (2): 2010, 2011

Eger

- National Cup of Hungary (1): 2014–15

Szolnok

- National Cup of Hungary (1): 2017–18

HAVK Mladost

- National Cup of Croatia (1): 2019–20
- Adriatic League (2): 2018–19, 2019–20

VK Radnički Kragujevac

- National Cup of Serbia (1): 2021–22

== See also ==
- Serbia men's Olympic water polo team records and statistics
- List of Olympic champions in men's water polo
- List of Olympic medalists in water polo (men)
- List of world champions in men's water polo
- List of World Aquatics Championships medalists in water polo
