= Strahinja Rašović =

Serbian water polo player

Personal information
- Nationality: Serbian
- Born: 9 March 1992 (age 34) Belgrade, SFR Yugoslavia

Sport
- Sport: Water polo
- Current club: Radnički Kragujevac

Senior clubs
- Years: Team
- –2010: VK Beograd
- 2010–2015: Crvena Zvezda
- 2015–2017: Atlètic-Barceloneta
- 2017–2020: Egri
- 2020–2021: Radnički Kragujevac
- 2021–2023: Novi Beograd
- 2023–2024: Vasas
- 2024–present: Radnički Kragujevac
Medal record
Men's water polo
Representing Serbia
Olympic Games
Gold medal – first place	2020 Tokyo	Team
Gold medal – first place	2024 Paris	Team
European Championship
Gold medal – first place	2026 Belgrade
Summer Universiade
Gold medal – first place	2017 Taipei	Team
Gold medal – first place	2011 Shenzhen	Team
Bronze medal – third place	2013 Kazan	Team

Strahinja Rašović (Serbian Cyrillic: Страхиња Рашовић; born 9 March 1992) is a Serbian water polo player for Radnički Kragujevac. He competed in the 2020 Summer Olympics.

== Honours ==
=== Club ===
Crvena Zvezda

- LEN Champions League: 2012–13
- LEN Super Cup: 2013
- Serbian Championship: 2012–13, 2013–14
- Serbian Cup: 2012–13, 2013–14

Atlètic-Barceloneta

- Spanish Championship: 2015–16, 2016–17
- Copa del Rey: 2015–16, 2016–17
- Copa de Cataluña: 2016–17

Radnički Kragujevac

- Adriatic League: 2020–21
- Serbian Championship: 2020–21

Novi Beograd

- LEN Champions League runners-up: 2021–22, 2022–23
- Adriatic League: 2021–22
- Serbian Championship: 2021–22, 2022–23

== Awards ==
- Hungarian Championship Top Scorer: 2019–20 with Egri
- Serbian Championship Top Scorer 2021–22 with Novi Beograd
- World Championship Top Scorer: 2023
- World Championship Team of the Tournament: 2022, 2023
