= Filip Filipović (water polo) =

Serbian water polo player (born 1987)

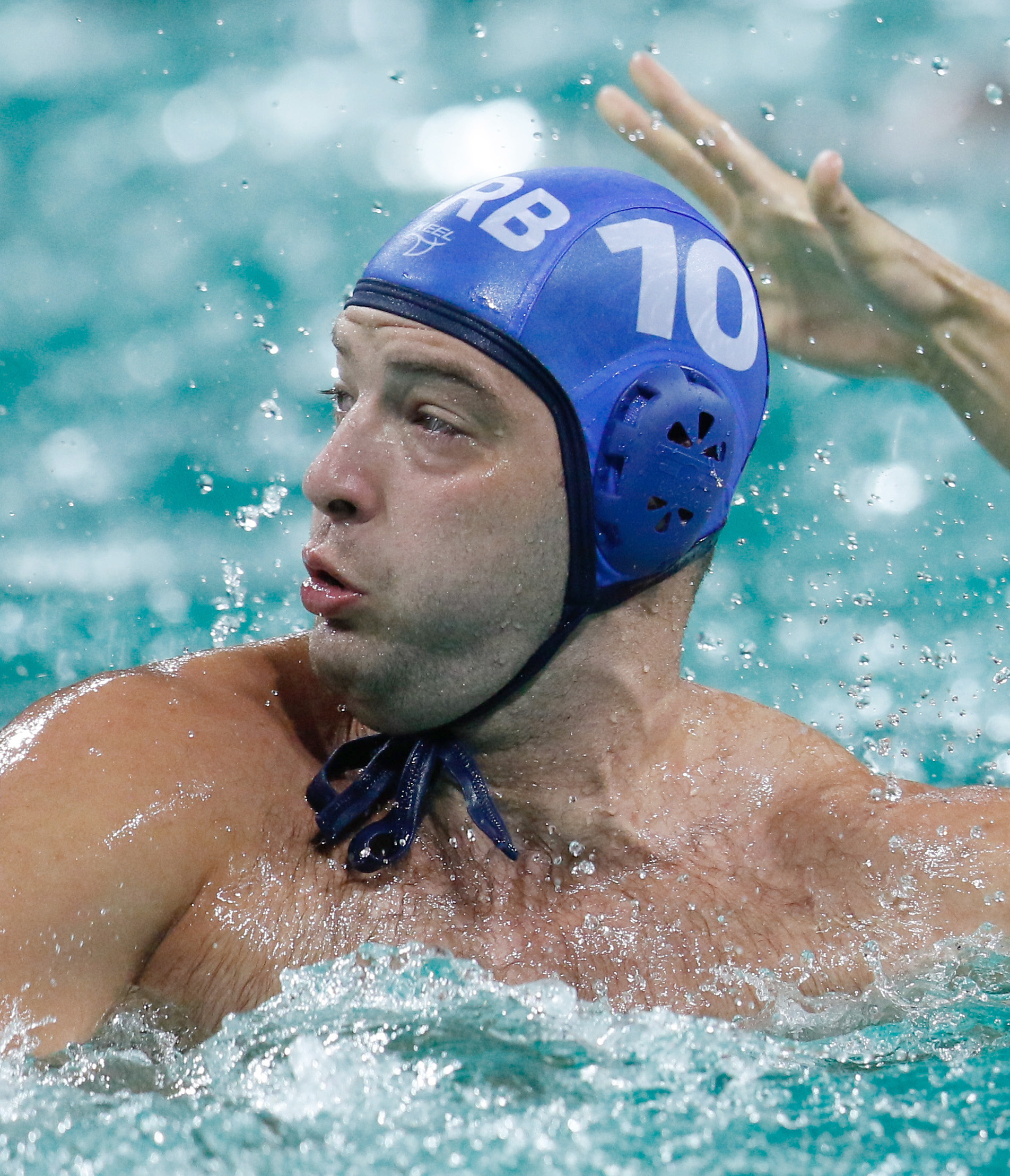
- Filipović at the 2016 Summer Olympics

Personal information
- Nationality: Serbian
- Born: 2 May 1987 (age 39) Belgrade, SR Serbia, SFR Yugoslavia
- Height: 1.96 m (6 ft 5 in)
- Weight: 101 kg (223 lb)

Sport
- Sport: Water polo
- Handedness: Left
- Position: Right Drive

Senior clubs
- Years: Team
- 2002–2009: Partizan
- 2009–2012: Pro Recco
- 2012–2014: Radnički Kragujevac
- 2014–2020: Pro Recco
- 2020–2021: Szolnoki Vízilabda
- 2021–2023: Olympiacos
- 2023–2024: Novi Beograd
- 2024-2026: Los Angeles Athletic Club
Medal record
Men's water polo
Representing Serbia
Olympic Games
Gold medal – first place	2016 Rio de Janeiro	Team
Gold medal – first place	2020 Tokyo	Team
Bronze medal – third place	2008 Beijing	Team
Bronze medal – third place	2012 London	Team
World Championship
Gold medal – first place	2009 Rome	Team
Gold medal – first place	2015 Kazan	Team
Silver medal – second place	2011 Shanghai	Team
Bronze medal – third place	2017 Budapest	Team
European Championship
Gold medal – first place	2006 Belgrade
Gold medal – first place	2012 Eindhoven
Gold medal – first place	2014 Budapest
Gold medal – first place	2016 Belgrade
Gold medal – first place	2018 Barcelona
Silver medal – second place	2008 Málaga
Bronze medal – third place	2010 Zagreb
FINA World Cup
Gold medal – first place	2010 Oradea
Bronze medal – third place	2018 Berlin
FINA World League
Gold medal – first place	2007 Berlin
Gold medal – first place	2008 Genova
Gold medal – first place	2010 Niš
Gold medal – first place	2011 Firenze
Gold medal – first place	2013 Chelyabinsk
Gold medal – first place	2014 Dubai
Gold medal – first place	2015 Bergamo
Gold medal – first place	2016 Huizhou
Gold medal – first place	2017 Ruza
Gold medal – first place	2019 Belgrade
Bronze medal – third place	2009 Podgorica
Mediterranean Games
Gold medal – first place	2009 Pescara
Gold medal – first place	2018 Tarragona
Representing Serbia and Montenegro
European Championship
Gold medal – first place	2003 Kranj
FINA World Cup
Gold medal – first place	2006 Budapest
FINA World League
Gold medal – first place	2005 Belgrade
Gold medal – first place	2006 Athens
Mediterranean Games
Bronze medal – third place	2005 Almeria

Filip Filipović (Serbian Cyrillic: Филип Филиповић; born 2 May 1987) is a Serbian former professional water polo player, who is widely considered to be one of the greatest players in the history of the sport. He was a member of the Serbia men's national water polo teams that won bronze medals at the 2008 and 2012 Olympics and gold medals in 2016 and 2020. He also held the world title in 2009 and 2015 and the European title in 2003, 2006, 2012, 2014, 2016 and 2018. He was named MVP at the 2011 World Championships. He was also voted as the male water polo "World Player of the Year" in 2009, 2011, 2014 and 2021 by the FINA magazine. He played for Pro Recco in Italy and won three LEN Champions League and three LEN Super Cup with them. In April 2024, he officially retired as a player.

Filipović was given the honour to carry the national flag of Serbia at the opening ceremony of the 2020 Summer Olympics in Tokyo, becoming the 26th water polo player to be a flag bearer at the opening and closing ceremonies of the Olympics.

== Club career ==
=== Pro Recco ===
In February 2010. Filip and his Pro Recco teammate Udovičić were guests in Soria. They played an all-stars humanitarian match between Italy and the selection of foreigners playing in the Italian championship, and all proceeds from the match went to charity – to help Haiti, the victims of the recent devastating earthquake. Caps of all players were offered for sale at a symbolic price of 30 euros. It was confirmed on 29 June 2011 that Filip and his teammates from Pro Recco will play in Adriatic Water polo League.

2011–12 season

In the second round of the Adriatic League, on 24 September, Filipović scored his first goal against Koper Rokava in a 16–4 home win. On 1 October 2011. Filipović scored two goals in the Adriatic League, in a 10–7 third round away win against Jug CO. On 15 October Filipović scored a goal in the fifth round of the Adriatic League, in a 15–8 home win against Primorje EB. On 22 October Filipović scored two goals in the first round of the Euroleague Group in an easy 13–5 win over Spartak Volgograd. On 29 October, in the Adriatic League seventh round 13–9 home win against Mladost, Filipović scored two goals. On 26 November Filipović scored a goal in the Euroleague third round, in a 10–8 win against Jadran Herceg Novi. Filipović scored two goals on 3 December in a humiliating 21–0 defeat over POŠK in the twelfth round of the Adriatic League. In the thirteenth round on 10 December, Filipović scored another two goals against Mornar Split in a 20–8 away win. On 8 February 2012. in the fifth round of the Euroleague, Filipović scored two goals in a 15–7 win against CN Marseille. 3 days later he scored another two goals but in the Adriatic League fifteenth round 9–8 home win against Jug CO. He scored one more in a win over Primorje EB by 13–6 on 18 February, in the sixteenth round. On 25 February, in the last round of the Euroleague group stage, Filipović was the top scorer in the 18–7 away win against Spartak Volgograd with five goals. Four days later, Filipović scored another five goals but in the Adriatic League fourteenth-round game behind, in a 21–5 easy home win over Mornar BS. On 3 March Filipović scored two goals in a 12–7 Adriatic League away win against Mladost, the second goal was his 20th so far.

== National career ==
Filip finally scored his first two goals on 17 January at the European Championship against Germany in the second game which the Serbs won by a score of 13–12. On 19 January, in the third game of the tournament, Filipović scored two goals in a big 15–12 victory against rivals and defending European champions Croatia. He will also remember the match for the unsportsmanlike conduct of Croat Nikša Dobud who deliberately struck him from behind, resulting in serious bruising underneath Filipović's right eye. Filipović responded by scoring two goals against the Croatians and waving the Serbian three-finger salute at the Croatian bench. On 27 January Filipović scored three goals in a semifinal 12–8 victory over Italy. Filip Filipović won the 2012 European Championship on 29 January. He scored a goal in the final against Montenegro which his national team won by 9–8. This was his third gold medal at the European Championships.

Filipović was the joint top goalscorer at the 2016 Rio de Janeiro Olympics, with 19 goals.

== Honours ==
Filipović has played for the Serbia and Montenegro / Serbia national team more than 381 times and has scored more than 677 goals. He has 35 medals with his national team, the most notable being gold medals representing Serbia at the World Championships in 2009 Rome and 2015 Kazan, as well as gold medals and individual MVP awards at the Olympics in 2016 Rio de Janeiro and 2020 Tokyo.

=== Club ===
Partizan

- Serbian Championship: 2006–07, 2007–08, 2008–09
- Serbian Cup: 2006–07, 2007–08, 2008–09

Pro Recco

- LEN Champions League: 2009–10, 2011–12, 2014–15; runners-up: 2010–11, 2017–18
- LEN Super Cup: 2010, 2012, 2015
- Adriatic League: 2011–12
- Serie A1: 2009–10, 2010–11, 2011–12, 2014–15, 2015–16, 2016–17, 2017–18, 2018–19
- Coppa Italia: 2009–10, 2010–11, 2014–15, 2015–16, 2016–17, 2017–18, 2018–19

Radnički Kragujevac

- LEN Euro Cup: 2012–13
- LEN Champions League runners-up: 2013–14

Szolnok Vízilabda

- LEN Euro Cup: 2020–21
- Hungarian Championship: 2020–21

Olympiacos

- Greek Championship: 2021–22, 2022–23
- Greek Cup: 2021–22, 2022–23

Novi Beograd

- Adriatic League: 2023–24
- Serbian Cup: 2023–24

== Awards ==
- FINA "World Player of the Year" award: 2009, 2011, 2014, 2021
- Swimming World Magazine's man water polo "World Player of the Year" award: 2014, 2016, 2021
- Waterpolo-World Magazine's man water polo "World Player of the Year" award: 2015
- LEN "European Player of the Year" award: 2009, 2014, 2016, 2018, 2021
- Member of the World Team of the Year's 2000–2020 by total-waterpolo
- Member of the World Team by total-waterpolo: 2018, 2021
- Sportsman of The Year by the Serbian Olympic Committee: 2016, 2021
- Serbia's sport association "May Award" : 2007
- Serbian Water Polo Player of the Year: 2009, 2010, 2011, 2012, 2013, 2014, 2015, 2016, 2018, 2019, 2020
- World Championship Top Scorer: 2009 Rome
- World Championship MVP: 2011 Shanghai
- World League MVP: 2019 Belgrade
- World League Top Scorer: 2011 Firenze, 2014 Dubai
- LEN Champions League MVP: 2013–14, 2015–16, 2018–19
- LEN Champions League Top Scorer: 2013–14
- LEN Champions League Right Driver of the Year: 2015–16, 2016–17, 2018–19
- Summer Olympics MVP: 2016 Rio de Janeiro, 2020 Tokyo
- Summer Olympics Team of the Tournament: 2012 Pekino, 2016 Rio de Janeiro, 2020 Tokyo
- Summer Olympics Top Scorer: 2016 Rio de Janeiro
- European Championship MVP: 2018 Barcelona
- Adriatic League MVP: 2011–12
- Adriatic League Right Driver of the Year: 2023–24
- Hungarian Championship MVP: 2020–21
- Hungarian Championship Right Driver of the Year: 2020–21
- Greek Championship MVP: 2021–22
- Greek Championship Right Driver of the Year: 2021–22, 2022–23
- Serbian Championship MVP: 2006–07, 2007–08, 2008–09, 2013–14
- Serbian Championship Right Driver of the Year: 2006–07, 2007–08, 2008–09, 2012–13, 2013–14
- Serbian Championship Top Scorer: 2007–08, 2008–09, 2013–14
- Serie A1 MVP: 2010–11, 2015–16, 2017–18

== Personal life ==
Filipović has two children, a son and a daughter, with his wife, Sanja.

== See also ==
- Serbia men's Olympic water polo team records and statistics
- List of Olympic champions in men's water polo
- List of Olympic medalists in water polo (men)
- List of men's Olympic water polo tournament top goalscorers
- List of flag bearers for Serbia at the Olympics
- List of world champions in men's water polo
- List of World Aquatics Championships medalists in water polo

Sporting positions
Preceded by Živko Gocić	Serbia captain 2017–	Succeeded by Incumbent
Awards
Preceded by (Serbia) Vanja Udovičić	Most Valuable Player of Water Polo World Championship; 2011	Succeeded by (Hungary) Dénes Varga
Preceded by (Serbia) Vanja Udovičić (Hungary) Dénes Varga; Italy	FINA Water Polo Player of the Year; 2011; 2014; 2021	Succeeded by (Croatia) Josip Pavić; Serbia; Incumbent
Preceded by (Serbia) Duško Pijetlović (Italy) Francesco Di Fulvio	Swimming World Magazine; Water Polo Player of the Year; 2016; 2021	Succeeded by (Hungary) Márton Vámos; Incumbent
Preceded by Ivana Maksimović	Flagbearer for Serbia (with Sonja Vasić); Tokyo 2020	Succeeded by Dušan Mandić; Maja Ognjenović
