= Adriatic league =

Adriatic league may refer to:

- Basketball ABA League, commonly known as the Adriatic League
- Adriatic Water Polo League
