= VK Partizan =

Water polo team

Vaterpolo klub Partizan
- Nickname: Crno-beli (The Black-Whites); Parni valjak (Steamroller)
- Founded: 1946; 80 years ago
- League: Serbian Super League; VRL Premier League; Euro Cup
- Based in: Belgrade, Serbia
- Arena: Sport Center Banjica
- Colors
- President: Jovan Lazarević
- Head coach: Stefan Ćirić
- Championships: 7 Champions League; 1 Euro Cup; 1 Cup Winners' Cup; 2 European Super Cup
- Website: waterpolopartizan.rs

Vaterpolo klub Partizan (Serbian Cyrillic: Ватерполо клуб Партизан) is a professional water polo club based in Belgrade, Serbia. It is part of the JSD Partizan sport society. As of 2026–27 season, the club competes in the Serbian Super League, the regional VRL Premier League, and the Euro Cup.

Partizan's home terrain is the pool which is part of the Sportski centar Voždovac on Banjica complex. The club is supported by Grobari, fans of all sport clubs competing under the name of Partizan Belgrade.

With seven European champion titles (the last in 2011 against Pro Recco), VK Partizan is the second most successful European team in water polo history along with Mladost, and behind Pro Recco with ten titles.

== History ==
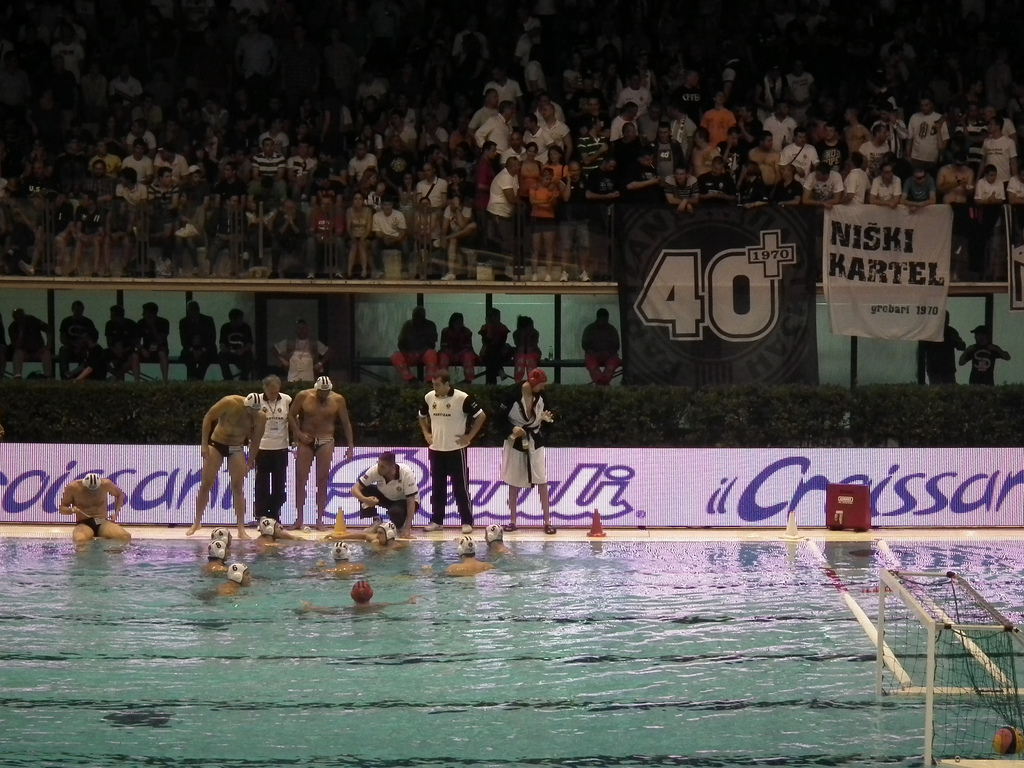
VK Partizan in 2011

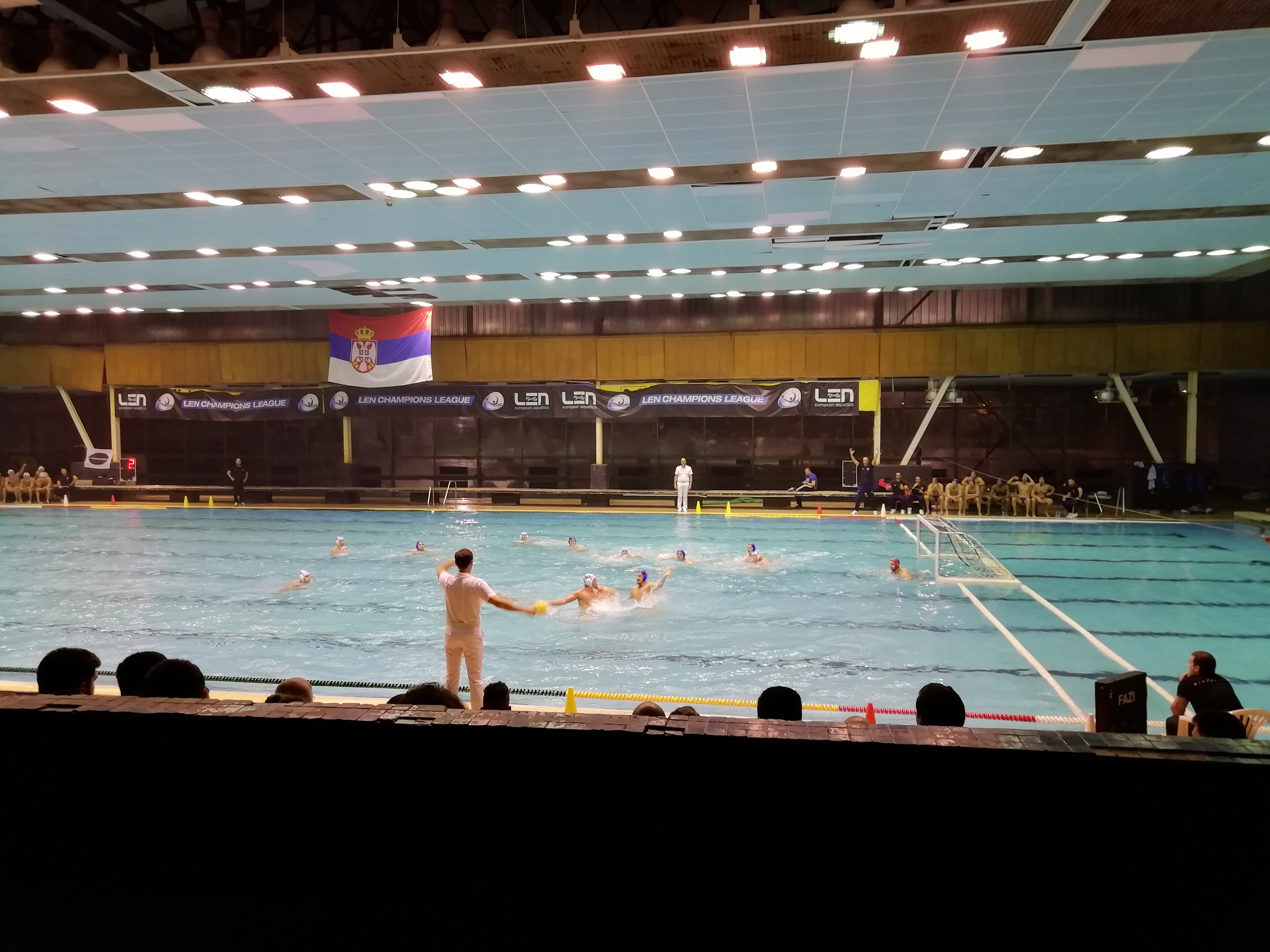
Game between VK Partizan and VK Šabac in October 2019

The club was founded in 1946 and from 1952 is a member of the First League. VK Partizan players had a big influence in Yugoslav and Serbian national water polo teams. They helped Serbia and Yugoslavia win many medals at the Olympics, European and World championships.

Alternate logo of VK Partizan

=== Creation of a championship team ===
VK Partizan began to write its rich history at the beginning of the sixties. The key moment for the beginning of Partizan's dominance in water polo sport was the arrival of Vlaho Orlić, probably the best water polo coach of all time. This event took place in 1958, when Vlaho came from VK Jug to Belgrade, to be both a coach and a player for VK Partizan.

A powerful team began to slowly emerge. Already in 1960, Mirko Sandić (top center), Nenad Manić, Dragan Čolović and Branko Živković were in Partizan. After two years spent in the PVK Jadran from Herceg Novi, the future first goalkeeper of the world, Milan Gale Muškatirović, returns to Belgrade. Boris Čukvas and Dragoslav Šiljak, representatives of the national team, then arrive in Partizan from Herceg Novi. Feliče Tedeski comes from Korčula, and Zoran Janković, a future national team player, from HAVK Mladost. It took several seasons to create a powerful team from this group of individuals, which will rule European water polo for the next decades.

In 1964, Partizan became the champion of Yugoslavia, for the first time in its history. One piece was missing in the mosaic. That piece was Đorđe Perišić. Đorđe was a famous swimmer at the time, a member of the Partizan swimming club and a member of the national team. After winning the championship title of VK Partizan, Đorđe decides to change his sport and joins water polo training. A fateful decision, because Đorđe later became a water polo player with six European championship titles. Perhaps the finger of fate, perhaps a logical sequence of events, then comes the creation of a European club competition - the first European Cup.

=== First European title and dominance in the 1960s ===
The final of the first European Cup in 1964 was held in Zagreb. In the decisive game for the title of European champion, Partizan defeated the representative of the Soviet Union - WPC Dynamo Moscow, with a score of 4-3. The first scorer of the tournament was Partizan center Mirko Sandić. Ozren Bonačić, the former captain of HAVK Mladost, the best water polo player in Yugoslavia at the time, played for Partizan in the first tournament of the European Cup as a reinforcement. Bonačić was declared the best player of the tournament. The following year, 1965, the final tournament of the European Cup was played in Italy. Partizan failed to defend the title of European champion, it was defeated in the final match by the host Pro Recco, with a score of 1-0.

The very next year, in 1966, Partizan managed to return the trophy of the European champion to its display case. Instead of the final tournament, an elimination system was played. Partizan knocked out the reigning champion Pro Recco in the semi-finals. As hosts, Pro Recco won the first game with a score of 4-1. Back then, few believed that Partizan could compensate for this high advantage of the Italians. However, in the second game in Yugoslavia, Partizan won 5-1 and qualified for the final. Carried by the frenetic support of the audience, Partizan's players played as if in a trance, many of them played the game of their lives that evening, and the hero, according to everyone, was the legendary goalkeeper Gale Muškatirović, who was practically invincible. In that match, Partizan's goalkeeper made an incredible 17 successful saves with only one conceded goal. In the final, Partizan beat SG Dynamo Magdeburg 5-3, so the 4-3 defeat in Germany was enough for Partizan to become the European champion. In 1967, Partizan continued its dominance in European water polo. The third title of the champion of Europe was won, with a victory over Pro Recco, with a score of 4-3. The final was played on a neutral ground in Geneva.

By the end of the 1960s, Partizan had won five Yugoslav championship titles, competing primarily with HAVK Mladost of Zagreb and PVK Jadran of Herceg Novi, Following the retirements of Boris Čukvas and Gale Muškatirović, the club added several players who became prominent during 1970s, including Siniša Belamarić from VK Šibenik, Duško Antunović from Korčula, Uroš Maravić from VK Jadran Split and Dejan Dabović from PVK Jadran.

=== The merry seventies ===
In talk about the seventies, the term "merry seventies" is often used. General social progress was evident, Yugoslavia was developing rapidly, and care was taken to ensure the even development of all six Yugoslav republics. As much as Belgrade was the center of development, Zagreb, Split, Ljubljana, Sarajevo and other cities were also taken into account. In this context, we can also observe sports events. The champions of the country changed from year to year, so for example in basketball, in ten years we have as many as seven different teams that were champions. In addition to Partizan, basketball titles were also won by Olimpija from Ljubljana, Zadar, Jugoplastika from Split, Radnički from Crveni Krst, Bosna from Sarajevo, and Red Star. It is similar in football, there was no pronounced dominance of one team, but the titles were won by Partizan (in 1976), Hajduk from Split, Željezničar from Sarajevo and Red Star.

The period of mid to late twentieth century saw the formation of an impressive era for VK Partizan in the field of both domestic and international water polo. The team bagged their sixth Yugoslav national league title in 1969/70 season, thus ending the consecutive reign of Zagreb HAVK Mladost, who were the reigning European champions. The list of players that played in KK Partizan during this era consisted of experienced players such as Zoran Janković, Mirko Sandić and Đorđe Perišić along with new talent like Belamarić, Maravić and Antunović.

VK Partizan won its fourth European Cup in 1971. The tournament took place at Tašmajdan Sports Center, Belgrade and comprised of two teams from Yugoslavia; one was the reigning European champions Mladost and the other one was the national champions Partizan. In this tournament, Partizan defeated WPC Dynamo Moscow 4-3 and Stockholms KK 7-2. After drawing with Mladost in the finals by a score line of 4-4, Partizan lifted the cup due to better goal difference.

The 1971 competition would be the last time Janković and Feliče Tedeski would appear in the European Cup. After their retirement, Sandić and Perišić were left as the only playing members of the club who had won the title back then. New players such as Ratko Rudić from the club VK Jadran Split, along with Zoran Bratuša, Predrag Vraneš, Nikola Stamenić, Nenad Manojlović, Predrag Manojlović, and Zoran Avramović joined the team.

Partizan became the champion of Yugoslavia eight times in a row, starting from 1972 and ending in 1979. Mladost, Jadran Split and PVK Jadran, Korčula, POŠK, VK Jug, VK Primorje, Kotor fought for second place. The first was practically reserved for the champions from Banjica. In these eight years, the Yugoslav Cup was won six times. In 1972, this competition was not even played, and the only time when Partizan did not win this trophy was in 1977, when they lost the final to Korčula. So, in eight years: championship 8/8, cup 6/7. During this period, Partizan is at the top of European water polo. In 1972, Partizan participated in the European Cup as the official champion of Europe. Without Zoran Janković, Partizan was eliminated in the quarterfinals by the later finalist Pro Recco. In 1973, we reached the European Cup final and lost 5-4 to the Hungarian OSC Budapest. In the following year, 1974, Partizan was yet again eliminated by OSC Budapest, this time in the semi-finals. And then, the 1974/75 and 1975/76 seasons. During these two years, Partizan wins all the games he plays, be they in the European Cup, the domestic championship or the Yugoslavian cup. So, for two years, all the games he played, Partizan won! European Cup final tournament for 1974/75. was played at Banjica in December 1974. In the final, Partizan overcame OSC Budapest with a score of 6-2 and won its fifth European title. After this tournament, Mirko Sandić says goodbye to playing water polo. What a career, 17 seasons in Partizan, 18 trophies won, 5 European championship titles.

The following year, in 1976, Partizan defended the title of European champion at the final tournament in the Netherlands. Behind the black and whites are the Hungarian Vasas SC, CN Posillipo and the Dutch HZC De Robben. Then Đorđe Perišić also said goodbye to active playing, after 13 seasons and 21 trophies, as a six-time European club champion. In 1977 and 1979, Partizan lost two semi-finals and finished fourth and third respectively in Europe. This generation sings its swan song in 1979/1980, when the seventh title of the European champion slipped away, due to the defeat in the final against Vasas SC 9-7. Let's summarize the "merry seventies". Partizan is in this period. in addition to nine national titles (eight in a row), he was European champion three times, played in the final two more times and was stopped in the semi-finals of the European Cup three more times. In addition to the already mentioned "old masters" - Janković, Sandić and Perišić, this period was marked by Antunović, Maravić, Belamarić, Rudić, Stamenić, brothers Manojlović, Bratuša, Vraneš, Marković, Avramović.

=== Last two decades of the 20th century ===
The last decade before the breakup of Yugoslavia brought a change on the water polo map, both domestic and Euro-water polo. Partizan was no longer the dominant team in Yugoslavia, but remained in the top, and in Europe, the black and white water polo players won third place in the European Cup three times and once reached the final of the same competition. In this period, Partizan won "only" 3 national championship titles and 4 cups. Mladost and Jug were more successful, albeit not much and not on the scale of Partizan in the 60s and 70s. Vlaho Orlić again took over the position of coach-advisor, and former Partizan players began to perform the work of the first coach: Mirko Sandić, Siniša Belamarić, Duško Antunović, Nikola Stamenić and Ratko Rudić. The latter won the Mediterranean Cup with Partizan in 1989, and it was the first trophy in that competition that was placed in the club's showcases.

Until the beginning of the 80s, Rudić, Belamarić, Stamenić, Predrag Manojlović were still playing for Partizan. In the meantime, new "Partizan sharks" are growing up in Banjica: Milorad Krivokapić and Aleksandar Šoštar, who were among the top goalkeepers in the world, Igor Milanović - probably the best water polo player in the world of all time, Igor Gočanin, Goran Rađenović, Zoran Petrović, and Dragan Andrić. In the second half of the eighties, the brothers Dejan and Darko Udovičić, as well as the center Dušan Popović, started playing for Partizan. The old and successful practice of bringing players from Croatian clubs continued, this time it was Anto Vasović and Vitomir Padovan. A little later Marinko Roje and Vaso Subotić arrived from PVK Jadran. All these players failed to fully prove themselves with Partizan playing on the Euro stage, primarily in the European Cup, but they still won 7 domestic trophies during the 80s, defeated the then invincible Jug and achieved excellent results with the national team.

The beginning of the nineties, as far as water polo is concerned, was marked by Mladost and Partizan. In the year before the dissolution of the country, Mladost won the championship and the European Cup twice in a row in 1990 and 1991, which tied them with our club in the number of European championship titles, and they were led by former Partizan ace Milanović, as well as Šimenc, Bukić... And our Partizan won its 11th Yugoslavian Cup in the 1989-1990 season. In the following 1990-1991, Partizan defended the trophy in the cup, but also won two trophies that it did not have in its showcases until then. At the end of 1990, the Cup Winners' Cup was won, in the final, the Dutch team Alphen was defeated in two matches. A few months later, in March 1991, Partizan won its first of two European Super Cup. For that trophy, the black and whites fought against the current European champions, Zagreb's Mladost. In both matches, Partizan won with a goal difference, the second leg was played in Zagreb, which gives this trophy even more importance. After that, the great state collapses. Šoštar, Padovan, Petrović, Gočanin, Roje, Popović, Zimonjić, Subotić left the club... some already in 1991, and some a little later. Earlier, in addition to the already mentioned Milanović, Vasović also left and Krivokapić ended his career.

Some new winds are starting to blow in our water polo. Thanks to the problems in which Partizan found itself and for which the management of the club, until then a more amateur club VK Crvena zvezda, won two national championship titles in 1992 and 1993, and a year later VK Budva, led by Šoštar and Milanović. However, this period did not pass dry for Partizan, the water polo players made sure by winning three consecutive cups, in 1992, 1993 and 1994. So that the black and white achieved a series of 5 consecutive triumphs in this competition and reached the 15th cup. They waited for the double until 1994-1995, which was actually 7 years without a domestic title. The LEN Trophy, the last Euro trophy that Partizan did not have, was won in the 1997-1998 season, with a victory in the final over Split's Jadran. It was 8-8 in Belgrade and 3-1 for Partizan in the second leg. The last decade of the 20th century was again a trophy season for the club, regardless of the fact that only one national championship title was won and that Partizan was in a subordinate position in relation to Crvena zvezda and later VK Bečej. However, 6 national cups won, Cup Winners' Cup, European Super Cup and LEN Trophy give the right to say that this period was also successful for the club from Banjica. Leading Partizan from the bench, these trophies were won by Ljubiša Mečkić and the club's playing legend, Nenad Manojlović, as well as Dejan Jovović.

And of the players, in addition to the already mentioned generation from the 80s, some of whom played for the club in the early 90s, a new generation began to emerge that will perhaps show its true colors only after leaving Partizan and playing for the national team. That generation was led by Dejan Savić, Danilo Ikodinović, Petar Trbojević, Risto Maljković, Nikola Kuljača, Žarko Petrović, and the slightly older Udovičić brothers. In the season in which the LEN Trophy was won, Partizan was strengthened by Vladimir Vujasinović, Nikola Ribić and Aleksandar Nikolić (who was already in the team when they won the double in 1995). During the 90s, the general sponsor of the club was Bambi from Požarevac. However, it will turn out that these funds that came to the club were not used in the best way, which led to huge financial problems and the departure of Partizan by a large part of the team that won the LEN Trophy, as well as lawsuits by some former players and finally, to the disbandment of the first team in 2003.

=== New millennium and the road to the seventh title of European Champion ===
The beginning of the 21st century was marked by the icing on the cake of Bečej's dominance, whose players won the 2000 European Championship title, and former Partizan players and coaches, Vlaho Orlić, Aleksandar Šoštar and Predrag Zimonjić, have a huge credit for that. In September 2001, Igor Milanović and Aleksandar Šoštar took over Partizan and temporarily put the club back on its feet. In the 2001-2002 season, VK Partizan won, after seven years of waiting, the double and thus ended Bečej's sixth dominance in domestic water polo. The club was led from the coaching position by the playing legend, Dejan Udovičić. Among the older players, he had at his disposal Nikola Kuljača, Boris Popović and Mihajlo Korolija.

In the meantime, a new generation came up at Banjica, led by Vanja Udovičić, and Slobodan Nikić, Živko Gocić, Miloš Korolija, Đorđe Filipović, Milan Tičić, Nemanja Marjan also played in it... Slavko Gak was brought from Zvezda, and Marko Ćuk (older brother of Miloš Ćuk) from Vojvodina. At the end of that season, Kuljača and Mihajlo Korolija left the club for Niš, while the then junior brothers Gojko and Duško Pijetlović, and Nikola Rađen came from Vojvodina. Filip Filipović, who was only 15 at the time, joined the first team. It was planned that this generation would finally win the seventh European Championship title by 2005 or 2006 at the latest. But in the summer of 2003, debts came due. Among the three options, the best one was chosen, most of the first team was disbanded and most of those players were picked up by Jadran, Primorac and Nis. Of the slightly older players, only Miloš Korolija and Đorđe Filipović remained.

The following season, Partizan had the youngest team in its history, in which two of the older players were 22 years old, and all the others were no more than 20. This of course resulted in winning only fourth place in the championship, being eliminated in the semi-finals of the cup and winning 1 point in the LEN Euroleague.

From the 2004-2005 season, the consolidation of the club began when Raiffeisen Bank became the general sponsor.

Jugoslav Vasović and Denis Šefik are returning to Partizan (who, admittedly, were still young players in their first stay at the club and did not leave any mark) but also Danilo Ikodinović. The best Slovenian player, Matej Nastran, was also brought in.

However, all this was not enough to end the dominance of the Adriatic in the next two years. However, unlike the previous two seasons, Partizan reached the finals of the playoffs and domestic cup. A huge shift was made in the Euro framework, because in 2005 they reached the final of the LEN Trophy, where Partizan was defeated by RN Savona, led by Kásás and Šapić. In 2006, after many years of black and white success and a notable result in the Euroleague, Partizan played in the 1/4 finals and lost to Jug, who later won this competition. The summer of 2006 brought the dissolution of the SCG state union, and automatically Partizan was left without competition in domestic circles.

Nikola Kuljača returns to the club, and one of the greatest water polo talents in the world, Andrija Prlainović, arrives from the PVK Jadran. Stefan Mitrović was also added to the first team. A new generation was slowly growing in Banjica, led by the slightly older Korolija and the younger Filipović, Milan Aleksić, Rađen, the Pijetlović brothers.

Živko Gocić, Vladimir Vujasinović, Slobodan Soro and Slavko Gak returned to Partizan in the following years. The stars of American and Greek water polo, Ryan Bailey and Theodoros Chatzitheodorou, were signed. Miloš Ćuk and Branislav Mitrović came from Vojvodina, Aleksandar Radović from PVK Jadran and water polo prodigy Dušan Mandić from Primorac. All this led Partizan to win six doubles in a row, as well as two trophies in the newly formed competition - Euro Interliga. It also reached the F4 EuroLeague twice, where it won third place and reached two 1/4 finals. However, the most important thing, winning the title of European champion for the 7th time, had to wait until 2011. Then Partizan defeated Pro Recco, with 11-7 on Stadio Olimpico del Nuoto. That 35-year-long dream was realized by Igor Milanović as a coach and by players Vladimir Vujasinović, Slobodan Soro, Andrija Prlainović, Duško Pijetlović, Aleksandar Radović, Milan Aleksić, Stefan Mitrović, Miloš Korolija. A few months after that, Partizan won its second LEN Super Cup, with a 11-6 victory in the final over RN Savona in its Piscina Carlo Zanelli arena and without four players who had previously won the EuroLeague. At the end of the 2011-2012 season, VK Partizan had won 62 trophies, plus another 8 unofficial ones. Three finals in the European Cup, five third places in the European Cup and EuroLeague, two semi-finals and five quarter-finals in the European Cup and EuroLeague, as well as one final each in the LEN Trophy and the LEN Super Cup.

== Honours ==
=== Domestic competitions ===
==== National League ====
- Yugoslav League (defunct)

Winners (17): 1963, 1964, 1965, 1966, 1968, 1970, 1972, 1973, 1974, 1975, 1976, 1977, 1978, 1979, 1983–84, 1986–87, 1986–88

- Yugoslav Winter Championship (defunct)

Winners (6): 1963, 1965, 1968, 1969, 1971, 1972

- FR Yugoslav League (defunct)

Winners (2): 1995, 2001–02

- Serbian League

Winners (10): 2006–07, 2007–08, 2008–09, 2009–10, 2010–11, 2011–12, 2014–15, 2015–16, 2016–17, 2017–18

==== National Cup ====
- Yugoslav Cup (defunct)

Winners (12): 1973, 1974, 1975, 1976, 1977, 1979, 1985, 1987, 1988, 1989, 1991, 1992

- FR Yugoslav Cup (defunct)

Winners (4): 1993, 1994, 1995, 2002

- Serbian Cup

Winners (9): 2006–07, 2007–08, 2008–09, 2009–10, 2010–11, 2011–12, 2015–16, 2016–17, 2017–18

=== European competitions ===
- Champions League

Winners (7): 1963–64, 1965–66, 1966–67, 1970–71, 1974–75, 1975–76, 2010–11
Runners-up (3): 1964–65, 1972–73, 1979–80

- Cup Winners' Cup (defunct)

Winners (1): 1990–91

- Euro Cup

Winners (1): 1997–98
Runners-up (1): 2004–05

- European Super Cup

Winners (2): 1991, 2011
Runners-up (1): 1976

=== Regional competitions ===
- Euro Interliga (defunct)

Winners (2): 2009–10, 2010–11

- COMEN Cup (defunct)

Winners (1): 1989

== Season by season ==
Season	Tier	League	VRL Regional	RWP Regional	Domestic cup	European competitions	
2025–26	1	5th place	6th place		QF	3 Conference Cup	QR2
2024–25	1	5th place		4th place (tier 2)	QF	—	
2023–24	1	5th place		12th place	SF	2 LEN Euro Cup	QR
2022–23	1	4th place		9th place	SF	2 LEN Euro Cup	EF
2021–22	1	4th place		6th place	SF	—	
2020–21	1	QF		10th place	SF	—	
2019–20	1	CX		9th place	SF	2 LEN Euro Cup	Q1
2018–19	1	SF		9th place	SF	2 LEN Euro Cup	Q1
2017–18	1	Champions		6th place	Winners	1 LEN Champions League	PR, 15th overall
2016–17	1	Champions		SF	Winners	1 LEN Champions League	PR, 10th overall

== Notable former players ==
- Dragan Andrić
- Dušan Antunović
- Marko Avramović
- Ozren Bonačić
- Nikola Dedović
- Živko Gocić
- Igor Gočanin
- Danilo Ikodinović
- Milorad Krivokapić
- Nikola Kuljača
- Slobodan Nikić
- Dejan Savić
- Slobodan Soro
- Zoran Petrović
- Duško Pijetlović
- Gojko Pijetlović
- Theodoros Chatzitheodorou
- Ivan Rackov
- Aleksandar Radović
- Nikola Rađen
- Goran Rađenović
- Ratko Rudić
- Milan Aleksić
- Andrija Prlainović
- Dušan Mandić
- Lucas Gielen
- Branislav Mitrović
- Stefan Mitrović
- Dušan Popović
- Vaso Subotić
- Aleksandar Šoštar
- Aleksandar Šapić
- Denis Šefik
- Milan Tičić
- Petar Trbojević
- Luka Saponjic
- Aleksa Saponjic
- Vanja Udovičić
- Darko Udovičić
- Dejan Udovičić
- Filip Filipović
- Jugoslav Vasović
- Vladimir Vujasinović
- Igor Milanović
- Miloš Korolija
- Miloš Ćuk
- Predrag Zimonjić
- Nikola Jakšić
- Siniša Belamarić
- Dejan Dabović
- Zoran Janković
- Nenad Manojlović
- Predrag Manojlović
- Miloš Marković
- Milan Muškatirović
- Đorđe Perišić
- Mirko Sandić
- Nikola Stamenić
- Dragoslav Šiljak
- Ryan Bailey

== Notable former coaches ==
- Vlaho Orlić
- Dušan Antunović
- Mirko Sandić
- Nikola Stamenić
- Ratko Rudić
- Nenad Manojlović
- Dejan Udovičić
- Igor Milanović

== See also ==
- ŽVK Partizan
