= Water Polo Regional League =

- Sport: Water polo
- Founded: 2025; 1 year ago
- No. of teams: 12 (top-tier); 9 (2nd-tier)
- Country: Montenegro; Serbia
- Continent: European Aquatics (Europe)
- Most recent champions: Radnički (1st title) (2025–26)
- Most titles: Radnički (1 title)
- Broadcaster: Arena Sport
- Domestic cup: No
- Website: total-waterpolo.com/vrl-premier-liga-2026-27/

The Water Polo Regional League (Serbo-Croatian: Vaterpolo regionalna liga, VRL) is a regional water polo league in Southeast Europe that features clubs from Montenegro and Serbia.

It was established in 2025, and inaugural 2025–26 season featured two tiers, the top-tier Premier League and the second-tier First League.

== History ==
The league was established in the summer of 2025, following the suspension of the Regional Water Polo League, with clubs from Montenegro and Serbia. On 1 July 2026, in a joint-meeting of Water Polo Federation of Montenegro and Water Polo Federation of Serbia, it was concluded to continue with yet another season of the regional competition. In the 2026–27 season, the league was expanded. From the existing eight teams, the league was expanded to 12 teams, four of which were from Montenegro.

== Organization ==
=== VRL Premier League ===
Locations of the 2026–27 VRL Premier League teams

Clubs that participate in the VRL Premier League (top-tier) for the 2026–27 season:

Club	City
(Montenegro) Budućnost	Podgorica
(Montenegro) Budva	Budva
(Montenegro) Jadran	Herceg Novi
(Serbia) Nais	Niš
(Serbia) Novi Beograd	Belgrade
(Serbia) Partizan	Belgrade
(Montenegro) Primorac	Kotor
(Serbia) Radnički	Kragujevac
(Serbia) Šabac	Šabac
(Serbia) Valis	Valjevo
(Serbia) Vojvodina	Novi Sad
(Serbia) Zemun	Belgrade

=== VRL First League ===
Clubs that participate in the VRL First League (second-tier) for the 2026–27 season:

Club	City
(Serbia) Beograd	Belgrade
(Montenegro) Cattaro	Kotor
(Serbia) Košutnjak	Belgrade
(Montenegro) Mladost Bijela	Herceg Novi
(Serbia) Novobeogradski Vukovi	Belgrade
(Serbia) Sava	Šabac
(Serbia) Spartak Subotica	Subotica
(Serbia) Stari Grad	Belgrade
(Montenegro) Sutjeska	Nikšić

== Finals ==
Season	Champions	Runners-up	Result	1st of Regular Season
2025–26	(Serbia) Radnički	(Montenegro) Primorac	17–11	(Serbia) Radnički

== Records and statistics ==
=== Performance by clubs ===
Club	Winners	Runners-up	Years won	Years runners-up
(Serbia) Radnički	1	0	2025–26	
(Montenegro) Primorac	0	1		2025–26

=== By country ===
Club / Nation	Won	Runners-up
Serbia	1	0
Montenegro	0	1

== All-time participants ==
2D	Played in the Second Division
1st	Champions
2nd	Runners-up
**Bold**	Teams playing in the 2026–27 season
^{R}	Regular season champions

Club	26	27	Total seasons	Highest finish			
Club	(Montenegro) **Budućnost**	8th	Total seasons	Highest finish	TBD	2	8th
(Montenegro) **Budva**	2D	TBD	1	TBD			
(Montenegro) **Jadran**	3rd	TBD	2	3rd			
(Montenegro) **Primorac**	2nd	TBD	2	2nd			
(Serbia) Crvena zvezda	7th	—	1	7th			
(Serbia) **Nais**	2D	TBD	1	TBD			
(Serbia) **Novi Beograd**	5th	TBD	2	5th			
(Serbia) **Partizan**	6th	TBD	2	6th			
(Serbia) **Radnički**	1st^{R}	TBD	2	1st			
(Serbia) **Šabac**	4th	TBD	2	4th			
(Serbia) **Valis**	2D	TBD	1	TBD			
(Serbia) **Vojvodina**	2D	TBD	1	TBD			
(Serbia) **Zemun**	2D	TBD	1	TBD			
