= Gojko Pijetlović =

Serbian water polo player

Personal information
- Nationality: Serbian
- Born: 7 August 1983 (age 43) Novi Sad, SR Serbia, SFR Yugoslavia
- Height: 1.94 m (6 ft 4 in)
- Weight: 92 kg (203 lb)

Sport
- Sport: Water polo
- Current club: VK Novi Beograd

Senior clubs
- Years: Team
- 2000–2002: Vojvodina
- 2002–2008: Partizan
- 2008–2010: Cattaro
- 2010–2011: Budvanska rivijera
- 2011–2012: Crvena zvezda
- 2012–2014: Ferencvárosi
- 2014–2018: Oradea
- 2018–2019: Šabac
- 2019–2021: Oradea
- 2021–2022: VK Novi Beograd
Medal record
Men's water polo
Representing Serbia
Olympic Games
Gold medal – first place	2016 Rio de Janeiro	Team
Gold medal – first place	2020 Tokyo	Team
Bronze medal – third place	2012 London	Team
World Championship
Gold medal – first place	2009 Rome	Team
Gold medal – first place	2015 Kazan	Team
Silver medal – second place	2011 Shanghai	Team
Bronze medal – third place	2017 Budapest	Team
European Championship
Gold medal – first place	2014 Budapest
Gold medal – first place	2016 Belgrade
Gold medal – first place	2018 Barcelona
Bronze medal – third place	2010 Zagreb
FINA World League
Gold medal – first place	2006 Athens
Gold medal – first place	2007 Berlin
Gold medal – first place	2010 Niš
Gold medal – first place	2011 Firenze
Gold medal – first place	2013 Chelyabinsk
Gold medal – first place	2014 Dubai
Gold medal – first place	2015 Bergamo
Gold medal – first place	2016 Huizhou
Gold medal – first place	2017 Ruza
Gold medal – first place	2019 Belgrade
Bronze medal – third place	2009 Podgorica
FINA World Cup
Gold medal – first place	2010 Oradea
Mediterranean Games
Gold medal – first place	2009 Pescara
Gold medal – first place	2018 Tarragona

Gojko Pijetlović (Serbian Cyrillic: Гојко Пијетловић; born 7 August 1983) is a Serbian water polo player who plays as goalkeeper for VK Novi Beograd and the Serbia men's national water polo team.

He was voted the best goalkeeper of 2014 European Championship. He was a member of the Serbian teams that won Olympic gold medals in 2016 and 2020, and a bronze medal at the 2012 Olympics. He held the world title in 2009 and 2015 and the European title in 2014, 2016 and 2018.

== Honours ==
=== Club ===
VK Partizan

- National Championship of Serbia: 2001–02, 2006–07, 2007–08
- National Cup of Serbia: 2001–02, 2006–07, 2007–08

Cattaro

- LEN Cup: 2009–10

== Personal life ==
Pijetlović is married to Iva, with whom he has daughter and son. His younger brother Duško Pijetlović is yet another Serbian prominent water polo player.

== See also ==
- Serbia men's Olympic water polo team records and statistics
- List of Olympic champions in men's water polo
- List of Olympic medalists in water polo (men)
- List of men's Olympic water polo tournament goalkeepers
- List of world champions in men's water polo
- List of World Aquatics Championships medalists in water polo
