= Spartak Subotica =

Spartak Subotica is the name of several sports clubs from Subotica, Serbia. It may refer to:

- FK Spartak Subotica, a men's football club
- HK Spartak Subotica, an ice hockey club
- KK Spartak Subotica, a men's basketball club
- OK Spartak Subotica, a men's volleyball club
- RK Spartak Subotica, a men's handball club
- VK Spartak Subotica, a water polo club
- ŽFK Spartak Subotica, a women's football club
- ŽKK Spartak Subotica, a women's basketball club
