= Andrija Prlainović =

Serbian water polo player

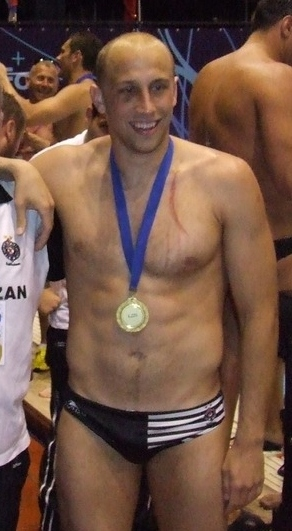
- Prlainović after winning the 2011 LEN Euroleague

Personal information
- Nationality: Serbian
- Born: 28 April 1987 (age 39) Dubrovnik, SR Croatia, SFR Yugoslavia
- Height: 1.87 m (6 ft 2 in)
- Weight: 93 kg (205 lb)

Sport
- Sport: Water polo
- Handedness: R
- Current club: CN Marseille

Senior clubs
- Years: Team
- 2003–2006: Jadran Herceg Novi
- 2006–2011: Partizan
- 2010: Fluminense
- 2011–2012: Pro Recco
- 2012–2014: Crvena zvezda
- 2014–2016: Pro Recco
- 2016–2019: Szolnoki Vízilabda
- 2019–2020: Orvosegyetem Budapest
- 2020–2025: Marseille
- 2025-present: Radnički Kragujevac
Medal record
Men's water polo
Representing Serbia
Olympic Games
Gold medal – first place	2016 Rio de Janeiro	Team
Gold medal – first place	2020 Tokyo	Team
Bronze medal – third place	2008 Beijing	Team
Bronze medal – third place	2012 London	Team
World Championship
Gold medal – first place	2009 Rome	Team
Gold medal – first place	2015 Kazan	Team
Silver medal – second place	2011 Shanghai	Team
Bronze medal – third place	2017 Budapest	Team
European Championship
Gold medal – first place	2006 Belgrade
Gold medal – first place	2012 Eindhoven
Gold medal – first place	2014 Budapest
Gold medal – first place	2016 Belgrade
Gold medal – first place	2018 Barcelona
Silver medal – second place	2008 Málaga
Bronze medal – third place	2010 Zagreb
FINA World League
Gold medal – first place	2007 Berlin
Gold medal – first place	2008 Genova
Gold medal – first place	2010 Niš
Gold medal – first place	2011 Firenze
Gold medal – first place	2014 Dubai
Gold medal – first place	2015 Bergamo
Gold medal – first place	2016 Huizhou
Gold medal – first place	2017 Ruza
Gold medal – first place	2019 Belgrade
Bronze medal – third place	2009 Podgorica
FINA World Cup
Gold medal – first place	2010 Oreada
Bronze medal – third place	2018 Oradea
Mediterranean Games
Gold medal – first place	2009 Pescara
Representing Serbia and Montenegro
FINA World League
Gold medal – first place	2005 Belgrade
Gold medal – first place	2006 Athens
FINA World Cup
Gold medal – first place	2006 Budapest
Mediterranean Games
Bronze medal – third place	2005 Almeria

Andrija Prlainović (Serbian Cyrillic: Андрија Прлаиновић; born 28 April 1987) is a Serbian professional water polo player widely regarded as one of the greatest players ever. He was a member of the Serbia men's national water polo teams that won bronze medals at the 2008 and 2012 Olympics and gold medals in 2016 and 2020. He also held the world title in 2009 and 2015 and the European title in 2006, 2012, 2014, 2016, and 2018. In 2011, he won the LEN Euroleague with VK Partizan and in 2013 with Red Star Belgrade, where he was one of the best scorers.

== Early life ==
Prlainović was born in Dubrovnik, Croatia and raised in Herceg Novi, Montenegro, where he came up through the PVK Jadran youth system.

== Club career ==
=== Montenegro, Serbia, Italy ===
He started his career in Jadran (2003–2006), and then moved to Partizan Raiffeisen for five seasons (2006–2011).

In 2011, he moved to the Italian Pro Recco but he spent only one season there as the club went bankrupt. He was then invited to return to Partizan but he decided to sign a contract with another Belgrade water polo club: Crvena Zvezda. Upon his arrival at Crvena zvezda he was made captain.

=== PA Fluminense ===
In June 2010, Fluminense triumphed in the Brazilian championship (in which a record number of foreign players (15) played that year), winning their fifth title. In the finals the team overcame Pinheiros, 13–7. Prlainović scored two goals in the final.

=== Pro Recco ===
On 17 September 2011, in the first round of the Adriatic League, Prlaionović scored a goal in an easy 14–6 home win against PVK Jadran. In the second round on 24 September, he scored his second goal against Koper Rokava in a 16–4 home win. On 1 October Prlainović scored his second Adriatic goal in a 10–7 away win against VK Jug CO. On 8 October in the Adriatic League fourth round, Prlainović and his team-mate and fellow countryman Pijetlović were the top scorers with each scoring three times in a 14–8 away win against VK Medveščak. Prlainović scored two goals in the fifth round on 15 October, in a 15–8 home win against Primorje EB. On 22 October Prlainović scored two goals in the first round of the Euroleague Group in an easy 13–5 win over Spartak Volgograd. On 26 October Prlainović scored another two goals in an easy 15–5 away win against VK Jadran Split, but this time in the sixth round of the Adriatic League. On 29 October he scored a goal in the Adriatic League seventh round 13–9 home win against Mladost. On 9 November Prlainović scored three goals in the second round of the Euroleague, in a 13–4 away victory against CN Marseille. On 26 November Prlainović scored two goals in the Euroleague third round, in a 10–8 win against VK Jadran Herceg Novi. On 30 November he scored another two goals, but in the eleventh round Adriatic League 16–1 away win over VK Primorac. Prlainović managed to score just one goal on 3 December in a humiliating 21–0 defeat over POŠK in the twelfth round of the Adriatic League. In the thirteenth round on 10 December, Prlainović scored three goals against VK Mornar Split in a 20–8 away win. Prlainović scored three goals on 14 December in the fourth round of the Euroleague, in a 14–9 away win against VK Jadran HN. The third goal was his 10th of the tournament. On 8 February 2012. in the fifth round of the Euroleague, Prlainović scored a goal in a 15–7 win against CN Marseille. 3 days later he scored two goals in Adriatic League fifteenth round 9–8 home win against Jug CO. On 25 February, in the last round of the Euroleague group stage, Prlainović scored three goals in the 18–7 away win against Spartak Volgograd. Four days later, Prlainović scored another three goals but in the Adriatic League fourteenth-round game behind, in a 21–5 easy home win over Mornar BS. On 3 March Prlainović scored a goal in a 12–7 Adriatic League away win against Mladost.

== International career ==
Prlainović scored his first two goals at the European Championship on 17 January against Germany in a second game which the Serbs won by 13–12. He also scored a goal in a third game on 19 January, in a great 15–12 victory for his country against the defending European champions Croatia. On 21 January in the fourth match, Prlainović scored three goals for his national team in a routine victory against Romania 14–5. On 23 January, Prlainović scored a goal in the last round of group A, in which Serbia lost to Montenegro with 11–7. On 27 January Prlainović scored a goal in a semifinal 12–8 victory over Italy. Andrija Prlainović won the 2012 European Championship on 29 January. He scored a goal in the final against Montenegro which his national team won by 9–8. This was his second gold medal at the European Championships.

He was part of the Serbian 2008, 2012, 2016 and 2020 Summer Olympic teams which won two gold and two bronze medals. He was the top goalscorer at the 2012 Olympics, with 22 goals.

== Honours ==
=== Club ===
PVK Jadran

- Championship os Serbia & Montenegro: 2003–04
- Cup of Serbia & Montenegro: 2004–05

VK Partizan

- Serbian Championship: 2006–07, 2007–08, 2008–09, 2009–10, 2010–11
- Serbian Cup: 2006–07, 2007–08, 2008–09, 2009–10, 2010–11
- LEN Champions League: 2010–11
- Eurointer League: 2010, 2011

PA Fluminense

- Brazilian Championship: 2009–10

Pro Recco

- Serie A1: 2010–11, 2014–15, 2015–16
- Coppa Italia: 2014–15, 2015–16
- LEN Champions League: 2011–12, 2014–15
- Adriatic League: 2011–12
- LEN Super Cup: 2012, 2015

VK Crvena Zvezda

- Serbian Championship: 2012–13, 2013–14
- Serbian Cup: 2012–13, 2013–14
- LEN Champions League: 2012–13
- LEN Super Cup: 2013

Szolnok

- Hungarian Championship: 2016–17
- Hungarian Cup: 2017
- LEN Champions League: 2016–17
- LEN Super Cup: 2017

CN Marseille

- France Championship: 2020–21, 2021–22

=== National team ===
- National team European junior championship 2004, 2006
- World junior championship 2005
- Olympic games gold 2016, 2020 bronze 2008, 2012
- World championship gold 2009,2015 silver 2011 bronze 2017
- European championship gold 2006, 2012, 2014, 2016, 2018 silver 2008 bronze 2010
- World cup gold 2006, 2010, 2014 bronze 2018
- World league gold 2005–2008, 2010, 2011, 2014–2017, 2019 bronze 2009
- Mediterranean games gold 2009 bronze 2005

== Awards ==
- Young Sportsman of the Year by MOC: 2005
- Top scorer at Summer Olympics: 2012
- 2012 Olympic Games Team of the Tournament
- Sportsman of The Year by the Serbian Olympic Committee: 2012
- Best Sportsman of SD Crvena Zvezda: 2013
- LEN Champions League Final Four MVP (1): 2013 with Crvena Zvezda
- All-Tournament Team of the 2017 World Championship
- World Championship MVP (1): 2015 Kazan
- European Championship MVP (1): 2016 Belgrade
- LEN Champions League Final Six MVP (1): 2017 with Szolnok
- Third Top European Player in the World by LEN: 2016
- Member of the World Team: 2018 by total-waterpolo
- LEN Champions League Left Winger of the Year: 2016–17, 2023–24

== Personal life ==
Prlainović is married to Ivana Culjkovic and has a daughter Djurdja.

== See also ==
- Serbia men's Olympic water polo team records and statistics
- List of Olympic champions in men's water polo
- List of Olympic medalists in water polo (men)
- List of men's Olympic water polo tournament top goalscorers
- List of world champions in men's water polo
- List of World Aquatics Championships medalists in water polo

Awards and achievements
Preceded by (Hungary) Dénes Varga	Most Valuable Player of European Water Polo Championship; 2016	Succeeded by Incumbent
