= VK Spartak Subotica =

Spartak Subotica
- Founded: 1945; 81 years ago
- League: Serbian Super League; VRL First League
- Based in: Subotica, Serbia

VK Spartak Subotica is a water polo club from Subotica, Serbia. It was established in 1946, as part of the larger Spartak Subotica sports society. They were champions of Serbia in 1952, 1956 and 1958 (when Serbian league was lower-level than the federal Yugoslavian one). As of 2026–27, the team competes in the Serbian Super League and the regional VRL First League.
