= VK Radnički Kragujevac =

Men's professional water polo club in Kragujevac, Serbia

Radnički Kragujevac
- Founded: 2012; 14 years ago
- League: Serbian Super League; VRL Premier League; Champions League
- Team history: VK Radnički (2012–2016); KVK Radnički (2016–present)
- Based in: Kragujevac, Serbia
- Arena: Sports Center Park
- Colors: Red and White
- Owner: SPD Radnički
- President: Jugoslav Vasović
- Head coach: Uroš Stevanović
- Website: kvkradnicki.com

Kragujevački vaterpolo klub Radnički (Serbian Cyrillic: Крагујевачки ватерполо клуб Раднички Крагујевац) is a men's professional water polo club based in Kragujevac, Serbia. It's a part of the Radnički multi-sports company. As of 2026–27 season, the club competes in the Serbian Super League, the regional VRL Premier League, and the Champions League.

== Honours ==
=== Domestic ===
- Serbian League

- Winners (3): 2020–21, 2024–25, 2025–26
- Runners-up (4): 2012–13, 2013–14, 2014–15, 2021–22

- Serbian Cup

- Winners (3): 2015, 2020, 2022
- Runners-up (4): 2014, 2016, 2018, 2021

=== Regional ===
- Regional Water Polo League

- Winners (2): 2020–21, 2024–25

- Water Polo Regional League

- Winners (1): 2025–26

=== European ===
- LEN Champions League
  - Runners-up (1): 2013–14
- LEN Euro Cup
  - Winners (1): 2012–13
  - Runners-up (1): 2024–25
- LEN Super Cup
  - Runners-up (1): 2013

== Season by season ==
Season	Tier	League	VRL Regional	RVL Regional	Domestic cup	European competitions	
2025–26	1	Champions	Champions		SF	2 Euro Cup	SF
2024–25	1	Champions		Champions	SF	2 LEN Euro Cup	Runners-up
2023–24	1	Runners-up		6th place	SF	2 LEN Euro Cup	QR
2022–23	1	3rd place		SF	SF	1 LEN Champions League	PR 11th overall
2021–22	1	Runners-up		4th place	Champions	1 LEN Champions League	PR 11th overall
2020–21	1	Champions		Champions	Runners-up	2 LEN Euro Cup	Quarter-finals
2019–20	1	CX		1st place (tier 2)	Champions	2 LEN Euro Cup	Q1
2018–19	1	3rd place		3rd place (tier 2)	Runners-up	-	
2017–18	1	6th place		-	QF	-	
2016–17	2	1st place		-	SF	-	

=== In European competition ===
Note: Updated as of 2024–25 season.

- Participations in Champions League: 8x
- Participations in Euro Cup: 5x

Season	Competition	Round	Club	Home	Away	Aggregate
2012-13	Euro Cup; Champion	Quarter-finals	(Spain) Mataró	14-5	17-9	31–14
2012-13	Euro Cup; Champion	Semi-finals	(Hungary) Debrecen	9-6	12-10	21–16
2012-13	Euro Cup; Champion	Finals	(Italy) Florentia	7-6	8-4	15–10
2013-14	Champions League; Finalist	Preliminary round (Group B)	(Serbia) Partizan	8-6	9-8	1st place
2013-14	Champions League; Finalist	Preliminary round (Group B)	(Germany) Spandau 04	16-10	13-8	1st place
2013-14	Champions League; Finalist	Preliminary round (Group B)	(Turkey) Galatasaray	13-8	11-7	1st place
2013-14	Champions League; Finalist	Preliminary round (Group B)	(Italy) Brescia	12-8	9-8	1st place
2013-14	Champions League; Finalist	Preliminary round (Group B)	(Romania) CSM Oradea	8-6	16-6	1st place
2013-14	Champions League; Finalist	Semi-final (F6)	(Serbia) Partizan	9–4		
2013-14	Champions League; Finalist	Final (F6)	(Spain) Barceloneta	6–7		
2014-15	Champions League	Preliminary round (Group A)	(Spain) Barceloneta	12-7	7-9	5th place
2014-15	Champions League	Preliminary round (Group A)	(Italy) Brescia	13-10	6-9	5th place
2014-15	Champions League	Preliminary round (Group A)	(Greece) Olympiacos	7-8	7-13	5th place
2014-15	Champions League	Preliminary round (Group A)	(Hungary) Eger	12-11	6-7	5th place
2014-15	Champions League	Preliminary round (Group A)	(Italy) Pro Recco	5-12	6-19	5th place
2015-16	Champions League	elimination in Second qualifying round				
2019-20	Euro Cup	elimination in First qualifying round				
2020-21	Champions League	elimination in Qualifying round				
2020-21	Euro Cup	Round of 16	(France) Strasbourg	11-10	^{w/o}	11–10
2020-21	Euro Cup	Quarter-finals	(Hungary) Szolnok	12-14	10-10	22–24
2021-22	Champions League	Preliminary round (Group A)	(Hungary) Ferencváros	11-11	12-13	6th place
2021-22	Champions League	Preliminary round (Group A)	(Greece) Olympiacos	10-8	7-11	6th place
2021-22	Champions League	Preliminary round (Group A)	(Spain) Barceloneta	3-9	7-13	6th place
2021-22	Champions League	Preliminary round (Group A)	(Georgia (country)) Dinamo Tbilisi	14-7	17-13	6th place
2021-22	Champions League	Preliminary round (Group A)	(Serbia) Novi Beograd	11-13	10-16	6th place
2021-22	Champions League	Preliminary round (Group A)	(Italy) Brescia	8-14	8-12	6th place
2021-22	Champions League	Preliminary round (Group A)	(Croatia) Jadran Split	13-10	8-9	6th place
2022-23	Champions League	Preliminary round (Group A)	(Italy) Pro Recco	8-16	12-21	6th place
2022-23	Champions League	Preliminary round (Group A)	(Spain) Barceloneta	10-14	9-18	6th place
2022-23	Champions League	Preliminary round (Group A)	(Germany) Waspo Hannover	13-12	12-7	6th place
2022-23	Champions League	Preliminary round (Group A)	(Georgia (country)) Dinamo Tbilisi	11-10	8-13	6th place
2022-23	Champions League	Preliminary round (Group A)	(Greece) Olympiacos	10-10	7-13	6th place
2022-23	Champions League	Preliminary round (Group A)	(Greece) Vouliagmeni	9-9	10-9	6th place
2022-23	Champions League	Preliminary round (Group A)	(Croatia) Jadran Split	11-13	10-10	6th place
2023–24	Champions League	Qualification round (Group B)	(Italy) AN Brescia	8-15	—	2nd place
2023–24	Champions League	Qualification round (Group B)	(France) CN Noisy-le-Sec	13-10	—	2nd place
2023–24	Champions League	Qualification round (Group B)	(Montenegro) Primorac Kotor	17-16	—	2nd place
2023–24	Champions League	Qualification round (Group B)	(Germany) ASC Duisburg	—	13-8	2nd place
2023–24	Euro Cup	Qualification round (Group D)	(Croatia) Primorje Erste Bank Rijeka	—	6-8	4th place
2023–24	Euro Cup	Qualification round (Group D)	(Croatia) Solaris Šibenik	9-10	—	4th place
2023–24	Euro Cup	Qualification round (Group D)	(Romania) CSM Oradea	—	7-9	4th place
2024–25	Champions League	Qualification round (Group B)	(Hungary) BVSC-Zugló	10-9	—	1st place
2024–25	Champions League	Qualification round (Group B)	(Greece) NC Vouliagmeni	14-13	—	1st place
2024–25	Champions League	Qualification round (Group B)	(Croatia) HAVK Mladost Zagreb	9-8	—	1st place
2024–25	Champions League	Main round (Group B)	(Croatia) Jadran Split	11-15	13-15	3rd place
2024–25	Champions League	Main round (Group B)	(Hungary) FTC-Telekom	5-12	4-16	3rd place
2024–25	Champions League	Main round (Group B)	(Georgia (country)) Dinamo Tbilisi	8-6	10-9	3rd place
2024–25	Euro Cup; Finalist	Eighth-finals	(Croatia) Jug AO Dubrovnik	14-13	15-9	29–22
2024–25	Euro Cup; Finalist	Quarterfinals	(Montenegro) Jadran Herceg Novi	12-8	6-9	18–17
2024–25	Euro Cup; Finalist	Semifinals	(Croatia) HAVK Mladost Zagreb	15-8	10-13	25–21
2024–25	Euro Cup; Finalist	Final	(Italy) Recco Waterpolo	12-16	9-12	21–28

== Current squad ==
Νο	Player	Position
1	(Serbia) Radoslav Filipovic	GK
2	(Serbia) Strahinja Rašović	
3	(Serbia) Nikola Dedović	
4	(Serbia) Sava Ranđelović	
5	(Serbia) Petar Jakšić	
6	(Serbia) Duško Pijetlović	
7	(Serbia) Andrija Prlainović	
8	(Serbia) Nikola Jakšić	
9	(Serbia) Nikola Murišić	
10	(Serbia) Boris Vapenski	
11	(Greece) Angelos Vlachopoulos	
12	(Serbia) Viktor Rašović	
13	(Serbia) Stefan Todorovski	GK
14	(Georgia (country)) Valiko Dadvani	
15	(New Zealand) Bae Fountain	GK
16	(Serbia) Veljko Dončić	
17	(Bulgaria) Samuil Ivanov	
18	(Serbia) Jovan Simović	
19	(Serbia) Jovan Gudurić	
Coach (Serbia) Uroš Stevanović
