= Serbian Water Polo Super League =

Premier Serbian water polo league

- Founded: 2006; 20 years ago
- No. of teams: 11
- Country: Serbia
- Confederation: European Aquatics (Europe)
- Most recent champion: Radnički (3rd title) (2025–26)
- Most titles: Partizan (29 titles)
- Level on pyramid: 1
- International cups: European Aquatics Champions League; European Aquatics Euro Cup; European Aquatics Conference Cup; European Aquatics Challenger Cup
- Website: waterpoloserbia.org

The Serbian Water Polo Super League (Serbian: Супер лига Србије у ватерполу / Super liga Srbije u vaterpolu) is the highest level of men's water polo in Serbia and it is organized by the Water Polo Federation of Serbia (Serbian: Ватерполо савез Србије / Vaterpolo savez Srbije).

== History ==
=== Kingdom of Yugoslavia / SFR Yugoslavia ===
Domestic water polo club competition in Serbia started in 1921, three years after Kingdom of Serbia became Kingdom of Yugoslavia, although officially was known as Kingdom of Serbs, Croats and Slovenes between 1918 and 1929. It was the first season of the Yugoslav Water Polo Championship which was played regularly from 1921 to 1991 with only exception being between 1940 and 1944 when the league was halted because of the Second World War. The first edition was won by VK Polet Sombor, which will also become Yugoslav champion in 1922 and 1924. However, the period referring to the kingdom of Yugoslavia between 1921 and 1940 was dominated by VK Jug Dubrovnik who won 14 out of 20 editions.

The later period referring to SFR Yugoslavia between 1945 and 1991 was dominated by VK Partizan who won 17 out of 46 editions.

=== FR Yugoslavia / Serbia and Montenegro ===
In the early 1990s several of the Yugoslav republics broke-away and in 1992 Serbia and Montenegro formed the FR Yugoslavia Water Polo Championship which would be played until 2006. Since in 2003 the country was renamed from FR Yugoslavia to Serbia and Montenegro, the league also followed the name changed properly in its 3 last editions. During this period another Serbian club came into prominence, VK Bečej, which won 6 out of 15 editions. Montenegrin clubs won 5 editions, 4 of which were won in the consecutive 4 last editions by PVK Jadran Herceg-Novi, and one by VK Budva in 1994. The rest of the editions were won by Serbian clubs, namely VK Crvena zvezda in 1992 and 1993, and VK Partizan in 1995 and 2002.

=== Serbia ===
In 2006 Montenegro declares independence and, consequently, the Serbian Water Polo League A and Montenegrin First League of Water Polo are formed. In the Serbian League A VK Partizan restored its domination by winning the first 6 consecutive editions.

== Current teams ==
=== Map ===
Locations of the 2026–27 Serbian Water Polo Super League teams

The following 11 clubs compete in the Serbian Water Polo Super League during the 2026–27 season:

Serbian Water Polo Super League
Team	City	Founded
Novi Beograd	Belgrade	2015
Radnički	Kragujevac	2012
Šabac	Šabac	1990
Vojvodina	Novi Sad	1935
Partizan	Belgrade	1946
Nais	Niš	2011
Spartak	Subotica	1946
Valis	Valjevo	1993
Beograd	Belgrade	1978
Novobeogradski Vukovi	Belgrade	2015
Zemun	Belgrade	1992

Clubs in the 2026–27 VRL Premier League
Clubs in the 2026–27 VRL First League

== Champions ==
Serbian Water Polo Super League (Super liga Srbije u vaterpolu)
season	Champion	Runner-up	3rd
2006–07	Partizan	Crvena zvezda	Vojvodina
2007–08	Partizan	Crvena zvezda	Vojvodina
2008–09	Partizan	Vojvodina	Nais
2009–10	Partizan	Vojvodina	Beograd
2010–11	Partizan	Vojvodina	Crvena zvezda
2011–12	Partizan	Crvena zvezda	Vojvodina
2012–13	Crvena zvezda	Radnički	Partizan
2013–14	Crvena zvezda	Radnički	Partizan
2014–15	Partizan	Radnički	Crvena zvezda
2015–16	Partizan	Crvena zvezda	Radnički
2016–17	Partizan	Vojvodina	Crvena zvezda
2017–18	Partizan	Crvena zvezda	Šabac
2018–19	Šabac	Crvena zvezda	Radnički
2019–20	Not held due to COVID-19 pandemic		
2020–21	Radnički	Novi Beograd	Crvena zvezda
2021–22	Novi Beograd	Radnički	Partizan
2022–23	Novi Beograd	Crvena zvezda	Radnički
2023–24	Novi Beograd	Radnički	Šabac
2024–25	Radnički	Novi Beograd	Šabac
2025–26	Radnički	Novi Beograd	Šabac

== Performances ==
=== All–time champions ===
- 1921 to present

Team	Championships	Years won
Partizan	29	1963, 1964, 1965, 1966, 1968, 1970, 1972, 1973, 1974, 1975, 1976, 1977, 1978, 1979, 1984, 1987, 1988, 1995, 2002, 2007, 2008, 2009, 2010, 2011, 2012, 2015, 2016, 2017, 2018
Bečej	6	1996, 1997, 1998, 1999, 2000, 2001
Crvena zvezda	4	1992, 1993, 2013, 2014
Novi Beograd	3	2022, 2023, 2024
Polet Sombor	3	1921, 1922, 1924
Radnički Kragujevac	3	2021, 2025, 2026
Šabac	1	2019

== Serbian water polo clubs in European and regional competitions ==
European Aquatics Champions League

Team	Winner	Years won
Partizan	7	1964, 1966, 1967, 1971, 1975, 1976, 2011
Bečej	1	2000
Crvena zvezda	1	2013

LEN Cup Winners' Cup

Team	Winner	Years won
Partizan	1	1991

European Aquatics Euro Cup

Team	Winner	Years won
Partizan	1	1998
Radnički Kragujevac	1	2013

European Aquatics Super Cup

Team	Winner	Years won
Partizan	2	1991, 2011
Crvena zvezda	1	2013

COMEN Cup

Team	Winner	Years won
Partizan	1	1989

Euro Interliga

Team	Winner	Years won
Partizan	2	2010, 2011

Regional Water Polo League

Team	Winner	Years won
Novi Beograd	2	2022, 2024
Radnički Kragujevac	2	2021, 2025

Water Polo Regional League

Team	Winner	Years won
Radnički Kragujevac	1	2026

== Notable players ==
- (Serbia) Filip Filipović
- (Serbia) Nikola Kuljača
- (Serbia) Dušan Mandić
- (Serbia) Stefan Mitrović
- (Serbia) Gojko Pijetlović
- (Serbia) Duško Pijetlović
- (Serbia) Andrija Prlainović
- (Serbia) Nikola Rađen
- (Serbia) Dejan Savić
- (Serbia) Slobodan Soro
- (Serbia) Vanja Udovičić
- (Serbia) Vladimir Vujasinović
- (Brazil) Danilo Tenenbojm
- (Croatia) Nino Blažević
- (Croatia) Damir Burić
- (Croatia) Marko Martinić
- (Croatia) Josip Vrlić
- (France) Gijom Dino
- (Georgia (country)) Beso Akhvlediani
- (Georgia (country)) Archil Bagashvili
- (Georgia (country)) Gela Koiava
- (Greece) Theodoros Chatzitheodorou
- (Greece) Angelos Vlachopoulos
- (Iran) Arshia Almasi
- (Japan) Kohei Inaba
- (Kazakhstan) Roman Pilipenko
- (Kazakhstan) Alexey Shmider
- (Kazakhstan) Rustam Ukumanov
- (Montenegro) Predrag Jokić
- (Montenegro) (Serbia) Denis Šefik
- (Montenegro) Zdravko Radić
- (Montenegro) Aleksandar Radović
- (Montenegro) Boris Zloković
- (Malta) Stevie Camilleri
- (Netherlands) Bilal Gbadamassi
- (Netherlands) Lucas Gielen
- (Russia) Ivan Gusarov
- (Slovenia) Matej Nastran
- (Spain) Álvaro Granados
- (Switzerland) Robin Pleyer
- (United States) Ryan Bailey
- (United States) John Mann
- (United States) Michael Rozenthal
- (United States) Andy Stevens

== See also ==
- Serbia men's national water polo team
