= Duško Antunović =

Croatian water polo player (1947–2012)

Personal information
- Born: 24 February 1947 Korčula, SFR Yugoslavia
- Died: 16 February 2012 (aged 64) Zagreb, Croatia

Sport
- Sport: Water polo

Duško Antunović (24 February 1947 – 16 February 2012) was a Croatian water polo player and coach. He competed for Yugoslavia at the 1972 and 1976 Summer Olympics.
