= VK Šabac =

Professional water polo club based in Šabac, Serbia

- Official logo
- Sport: Water polo
- Founded: 1990; 36 years ago
- League: Serbian Super League; VRL Premier League; Euro Cup
- Based in: Šabac, Serbia
- Stadium: Šabac City Swimming Pool
- Colors
- Managing director: Nenad Živanović
- Head coach: Emil Nikolić
- Website: vksabac.com

VK Šabac (Serbian Cyrillic: ВК Шабац), also known as VK Šabac Elixir (for sponsorship reasons), is a professional water polo club based in Šabac, Serbia. As of 2026–27 season, the club competes in the Serbian Super League, the regional VRL Premier League, and the Euro Cup.

== History ==
=== 1990–2015: The beginnings and turbulent period ===
The club was established in 1990. In 2001–02 season, VK Šabac promoted to the top-tier National Championship of FR Yugoslavia where it played for four consecutive seasons. In 2004–05 season, the club participated in continental LEN Euro Cup. In 2005, the city-governed Swimming Pool in Šabac was closed due to poor conditions and the club was forced to merge with Belgrade-based "Sever" water polo club.

=== 2015–present: Rise to prominence ===
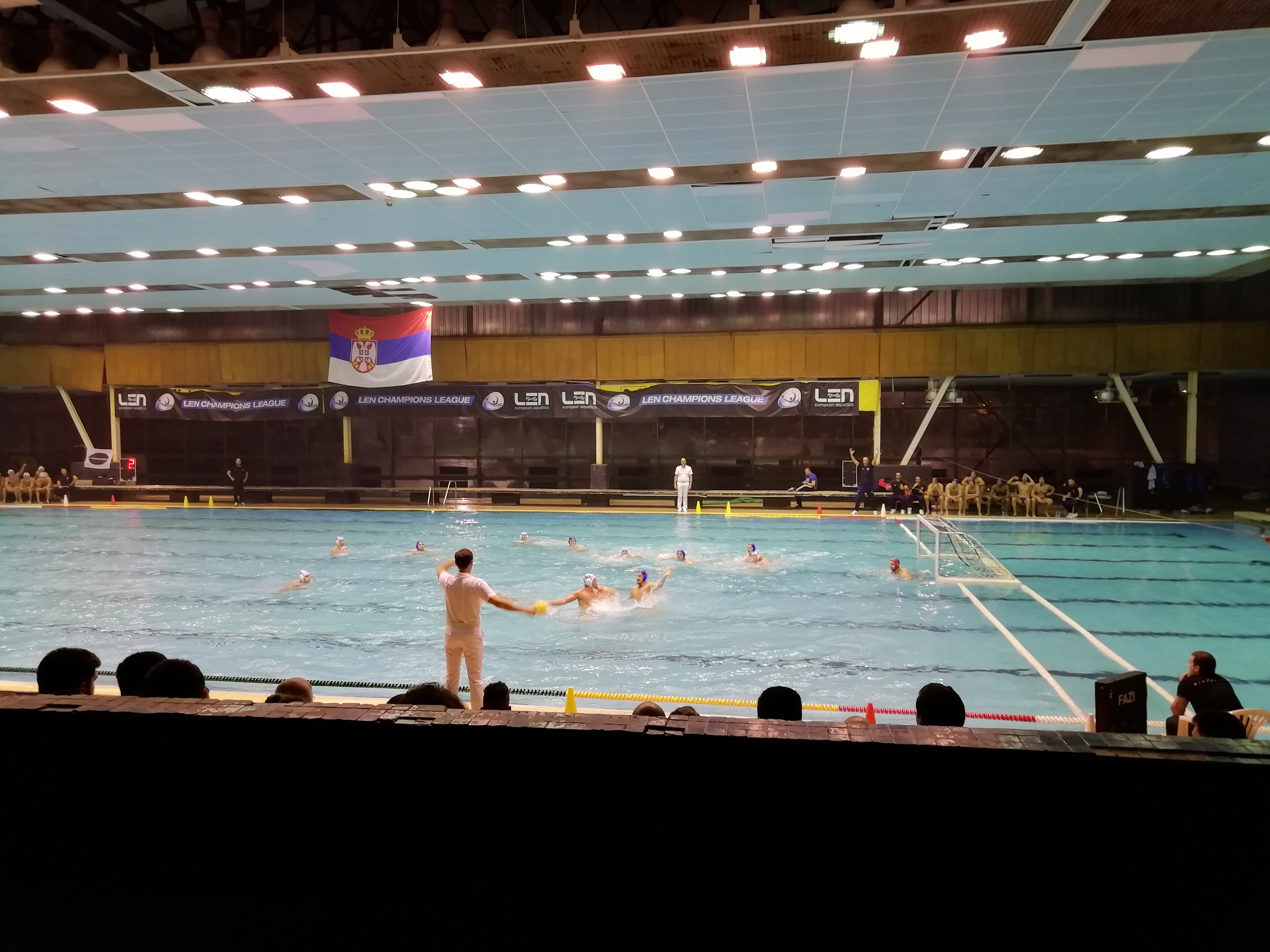
Game between VK Šabac and VK Partizan at SC Banjica, October 2019

In June 2015, the city of Šabac finally opened renovated indoor Swimming Pool, thus way creating conditions for VK Šabac to return to hometown. The city government entrusted the club's management to manage the Swimming Pool. The club has also managed to gain promotion to the Serbian Water Polo League A for 2015–16 season.

In 2016–17 season, VK Šabac participated in second-tier Regional Water Polo League A2, finishing in third place behind VK Primorac Kotor and POŠK.

In December 2017, VK Šabac was runner-up of the 2017–18 Serbian Water Polo Cup, after losing to VK Partizan with 6–5 in the final game. In March 2018, VK Šabac gained promotion to top-tier Regional Water Polo League A1, after securing second place in Regional Water Polo League A2 and defeating VK Budva in playoffs. In Serbian Water Polo League A, VK Šabac finished the season in third place.

On October 19, 2018, VK Šabac won its first match in Regional Water Polo League A1, after defeating VK Partizan with 12–10. In December 2018, VK Šabac won the 2018–19 Serbian Water Polo Cup, after defeating VK Radnički Kragujevac with 10–9 in the final game. In 2018–19 season, VK Šabac finished the season of Regional Water Polo League A1 in sixth place, with 7–0–11 record. VK Šabac finished the historic club's season by winning its first national championship, defeating VK Crvena zvezda with 2–1 in the final series of the Serbian Water Polo League A.

The club started the 2019–20 season with matches in 2019–20 LEN Champions League Qualification round I as tournament host, winning the second place in a group and advancing to Qualification round II, where it lost in all three matches of group C thus way failing to advance to the final Qualification round. In December 2019, VK Šabac lost in the final game of the Serbian Water Polo Cup to Radnički Kragujevac with 10–8, failing to defend the title.

In May 2023, the Serbian agribusiness company Elixir Zorka became the main sponsor of the club.

== Season by season ==
Season	Tier	League	VRL Regional	RVL Regional	Domestic cup	European competitions	
2025–26	1	SF	4th place		Runners-up	2 Euro Cup	EF
2024–25	1	3rd place		6th place	QF	2 LEN Euro Cup	EF
2023–24	1	3rd place		10th place	QF	2 LEN Euro Cup	GS
2022–23	1	4th place		7th place	QF	2 LEN Euro Cup	QF
2021–22	1	SF		11th place	QF	2 LEN Euro Cup	Q2
2020–21	1	SF		7th place	QF	-	
2019–20	1	CX		7th place	Runners-up	-	
2018–19	1	Champions		5th place	Champions	-	
2017–18	1	3rd place		2nd place (tier 2)	Runners-up	-	
2016–17	1	4th place		3rd place (tier 2)	QF	-	

=== In European competition ===
Note: Updated as of 2022-23 season.

- Participations in Champions League: 1x
- Participations in Euro Cup: 2x

Season	Competition	Round	Club	Home	Away	Aggregate
2019-20	Champions League	elimination in Second qualifying round				
2021-22	Euro Cup	elimination in Second qualifying round				
2022-23	Euro Cup	Round of 16	(Spain) Barcelona	13–10	11–12	24–22
2022-23	Euro Cup	Quarter-finals	(Hungary) Vasas	-	-	–

== Honours ==
- National Championship
  - Winners (1) : 2018–19
- National Cup
  - Winners (1) : 2019
  - Runners-up (3) : 2018, 2020, 2026
