= VK Beograd =

Serbian water polo team

Vaterpolo klub Beograd
- Founded: 1978; 48 years ago
- League: Serbian Super League; VRL First League
- Based in: Belgrade, Serbia
- Arena: SC Tašmajdan
- Colors

Vaterpolo klub Beograd (Serbian Cyrillic: Ватерполо клуб Београд) is a water polo club from Belgrade, Serbia. As of 2026–27, the team competes in the Serbian Super League and the regional VRL First League.
