= Duško Pijetlović =

Serbian water polo player

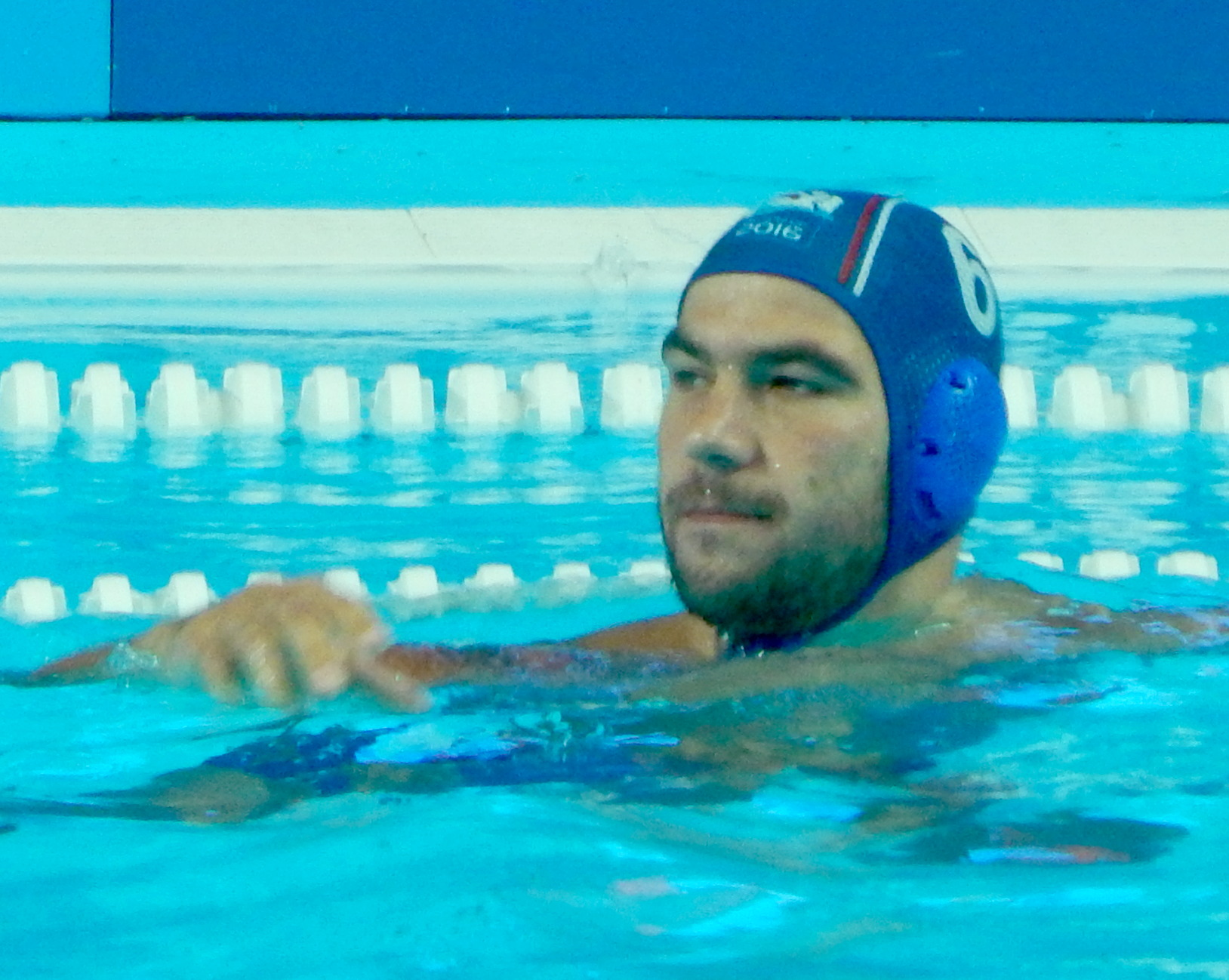
- Pijetlović at the 2015 World Championships

Personal information
- Nationality: Serbian
- Born: 25 April 1985 (age 41) Novi Sad, SR Serbia, SFR Yugoslavia
- Height: 1.97 m (6 ft 6 in)
- Weight: 99 kg (218 lb)

Sport
- Sport: Water polo
- Current club: Novi Beograd
- Number: 6

Senior clubs
- Years: Team
- 2000–2002: Vojvodina
- 2002–2011: Partizan
- 2011–2012: Pro Recco
- 2012–2013: Crvena zvezda
- 2013–2014: Sintez Kazan
- 2014–2017: Pro Recco
- 2017–2019: Dynamo Moscow
- 2019–2021: Szolnoki Vízilabda
- 2021–present: Novi Beograd
Medal record
Men's water polo
Representing Serbia
Olympic Games
Gold medal – first place	2016 Rio de Janeiro	Team
Gold medal – first place	2020 Tokyo	Team
Bronze medal – third place	2008 Beijing	Team
Bronze medal – third place	2012 London	Team
World Championship
Gold medal – first place	2009 Rome	Team
Gold medal – first place	2015 Kazan	Team
Silver medal – second place	2011 Shanghai	Team
Bronze medal – third place	2017 Budapest	Team
European Championship
Gold medal – first place	2006 Belgrade
Gold medal – first place	2012 Eindhoven
Gold medal – first place	2014 Budapest
Gold medal – first place	2016 Belgrade
Gold medal – first place	2018 Barcelona
Silver medal – second place	2008 Málaga
Bronze medal – third place	2010 Zagreb
FINA World League
Gold medal – first place	2007 Berlin
Gold medal – first place	2008 Genova
Gold medal – first place	2010 Niš
Gold medal – first place	2011 Firenze
Gold medal – first place	2014 Dubai
Gold medal – first place	2015 Bergamo
Gold medal – first place	2016 Huizhou
Gold medal – first place	2017 Ruza
Gold medal – first place	2019 Belgrade
Bronze medal – third place	2009 Podgorica
FINA World Cup
Gold medal – first place	2010 Oradea
Bronze medal – third place	2018 Oradea
Mediterranean Games
Gold medal – first place	2009 Pescara
Gold medal – first place	2018 Tarragona
Representing Serbia and Montenegro
FINA World League
Gold medal – first place	2005 Belgrade
Gold medal – first place	2006 Athens
FINA World Cup
Gold medal – first place	2006 Budapest

Duško Pijetlović (Serbian Cyrillic: Душко Пијетловић; born 25 April 1985) is a Serbian water polo center forward for VK Novi Beograd. He was a member of the Serbia men's national water polo teams that won Olympic gold medals in 2016 and 2020, and bronze medals at the 2008 and 2012 Olympics. He held the world title in 2009 and 2015 and the European title in 2006, 2012, 2014, 2016 and 2018. Pijetlović won three consecutive Euroleague titles with three teams: in 2011 with Partizan in 2012 with Pro Recco and in 2013 with Crvena Zvezda.

== Club career ==
=== Pro Recco ===
On 17 September 2011, in the first round of the Adriatic League, Pijetlović and Sandro Sukno were the top scorers with each scoring three times in an easy 14–6 home win against Jadran HN. In the second round on 24 September, he scored a goal against Koper Rokava in a 16–4 home win. On 1 October Pijetlović scored two goals in a 10–7 Adriatic League away win against VK Jug. On 8 October in the Adriatic League fourth round, Pijetlović and his team-mate and fellow countryman Prlainović were the top scorers with each scoring three times in a 14–8 away win against Medveščak. Pijetlović was again the top scorer of the fifth round in his team on 15 October, he scored three goals in a 15–8 home win against Primorje EB. On 22 October Pijetlović scored a goal in the first round of the Euroleague Group in an easy 13–5 win over Spartak Volgograd. On 26 October Pijetlović scored another goal in an easy 15–5 away win against Jadran ST, but this time in the sixth round of the Adriatic League. On 29 October, in the Adriatic League seventh round 13–9 home win against Mladost, Pijetlović scored three goals. Pijetlović scored his sixteenth Adriatic League goal on 5 November, in a 14–7 away win against Šibenik. On 9 November Pijetlović scored his second goal of the tournament in the second round of the Euroleague, in a 13–4 away victory against CN Marseille. But just after 3 days, on 12 November, he scored an amazing five goals for his team in 16–7 away win against Budva M:tel, in the ninth round of the Adriatic League. On 26 November Pijetlović scored two goals in the Euroleague third round, in a 10–8 win against VK Jadran HN. On 30 November he scored another two goals, but in the eleventh round Adriatic League 16–1 away win over Primorac. Pijetlović managed to score just one goal on 3 December in a humiliating 21–0 defeat over POŠK in the twelfth round of the Adriatic League. In the thirteenth round on 10 December, Pijetlović scored two goals against Mornar BS in a 20–8 away win. Pijetlović scored three goals on 14 December in the fourth round of the Euroleague, in a 14–9 away win against VK Jadran HN. How the tournament went on, Duško Pijetlović lifted his form. On 8 February 2012. in the fifth round of the Euroleague, he scored an astonishing seven goals in a 15–7 win against CN Marseille. With seven goals scored he doubled up his tally to fourteen goals overall in Euroleague so far. 3 days later he scored his 27th goal in Adriatic League fifteenth round 9–8 home win against Jug CO. He made it 30 in a win over Primorje EB by 13–6 on 18 February, in the sixteenth round. On 25 February, in the last round of the Euroleague group stage, Pijetlović scored three goals in the 18–7 away win against Spartak Volgograd. Four days later, Pijetlović alongside his team-mate Filipović scored five goals in the Adriatic League fourteenth-round game behind, in a 21–5 easy home win over Mornar BS. On 3 March Pijetlović scored a goal in a 12–7 Adriatic League away win against Mladost.

== National career ==
On 16 January, at the European Championship Pijetlović scored in the first game two goals in an 8–5 win against Spain. In the second game, on 17 January, Pijetlović scored four goals for his national team helping them in a 13–12 win over Germany. On 19 January, in a difficult game against the defending European champions Croatia, Pijetlović scored two goals in a 15–12 win. On 21 January in the fourth match, Pijetlović was the top scorer with four goals in a routine victory against Romania 14–5. On 23 January, in the last round of group A, which Serbia lost to Montenegro with 11–7, Pijetlović scored two goals. Duško Pijetlović won the 2012 European Championship on 29 January. He scored a goal in the final against Montenegro which his national team won by 9–8. This was his second gold medal at the European Championships.

== Honours ==
=== Club ===
VK Partizan

- Serbian Championship: 2006–07, 2007–08, 2008–09, 2009–10, 2010–11
- Serbian Cup: 2006–07, 2007–08, 2008–09, 2009–10, 2010–11
- LEN Champions League: 2010–11
- Eurointer League; 2010, 2011

Sintez Kazan

- Russian Championship: 2013–14

Pro Recco

- Serie A1: 2011–12, 2014–15, 2015–16
- Coppa Italia: 2014–15, 2015–16
- LEN Champions League: 2011–12, 2014–15
- LEN Super Cup: 2015
- Adriatic League: 2011–12

VK Crvena Zvezda

- Serbian Championship: 2012–13
- Serbian Cup: 2012–13
- LEN Champions League: 2012–13

Dynamo Moscow

- Russian Championship: 2017–18, 2018–19
- Russian Cup: 2017–18, 2018–19

Szolnok

- Hungarian Championship: 2020–21
- LEN Euro Cup: 2020–21

VK Novi Beograd

- LEN Champions League runners-up: 2021–22, 2022–23
- Adriatic League: 2021–22, 2023–24
- Serbian Championship: 2021–22, 2022–23
- Serbian Cup: 2023–24

== Awards ==
- Swimming World magazine's man water polo "World Player of the Year" award: 2015
- LEN "European Player of the Year" award: 2015
- Member of the World Team by total-waterpolo: 2021
- Member of Second World Team of the Year's 2000–2020 by total-waterpolo
- 2013 World Championship Team of the Tournament
- 2015 World Championship Team of the Tournament
- World Championship MVP: 2015
- Adriatic League MVP : 2021–22

== Personal life ==
Pijetlović is married to Marina and has two sons. His older brother Gojko Pijetlović is yet another Serbian prominent water polo player.

== See also ==
- Serbia men's Olympic water polo team records and statistics
- List of Olympic champions in men's water polo
- List of Olympic medalists in water polo (men)
- List of world champions in men's water polo
- List of World Aquatics Championships medalists in water polo

Awards
Preceded by (Hungary) Dénes Varga	Most Valuable Player of Water Polo World Championship; 2015	Succeeded by (Hungary) Márton Vámos
Preceded by (Serbia) Stefan Živojinović	Swimming World Magazine; Water Polo Player of the Year; 2015	Succeeded by (Serbia) Filip Filipović
