= VK Vojvodina =

Vaterpolo klub Vojvodina Novi Sad
- Founded: 1935; 91 years ago
- League: Serbian Super League; VRL Premier League
- Based in: Novi Sad, Serbia
- Arena: SC Slana Bara
- Colors
- President: Dragan Resanović
- Head coach: Darko Bilić
- Website: vkvojvodina.org.rs

Vaterpolo klub Vojvodina (Serbian Cyrillic: Ватерполо клуб Војводина) is a professional water polo club based in Novi Sad, Serbia. As of 2026–27 season, the club competes in the Serbian Super League and the regional VRL Premier League.

== Honours ==
- Serbian League
  - Runners-up (4): 2008–09, 2009–10, 2010–11, 2016–17
  - Third place (3): 2006–07, 2007–08, 2011–12
- Serbian Cup
  - Runners-up (3): 2009, 2010, 2011

== Season by season ==
=== In European competition ===
- Participations in Champions League (Euroleague): 5x
- Participations in Euro Cup (LEN Cup): 5x

Season	Competition	Round	Club	Home	Away	Aggregate
2005-06	LEN Cup	elimination in Second qualifying round				
2007-08	Euroleague	elimination in Second qualifying round				
2008-09	Euroleague	elimination in Second qualifying round				
2008-09	LEN Cup	Round of 16	(Greece) Chios	14-9	10-10	24–19
2008-09	LEN Cup	Quarter-finals	(Hungary) Szeged	10-10	8-9	18–19
2009-10	Euroleague	Preliminary round (Group A)	(Spain) Barceloneta	11-9	9-14	4th place
2009-10	Euroleague	Preliminary round (Group A)	(Montenegro) Jadran Herceg Novi	5-9	6-13	4th place
2009-10	Euroleague	Preliminary round (Group A)	(Croatia) HAVK Mladost	2-7	11-11	4th place
2010-11	Euroleague	Preliminary round (Group B)	(Italy) Pro Recco	8-15	2-16	4th place
2010-11	Euroleague	Preliminary round (Group B)	(Russia) Spartak Volgograd	10-10	8-6	4th place
2010-11	Euroleague	Preliminary round (Group B)	(Montenegro) Budva	6-9	7-9	4th place
2011-12	Champions League	Preliminary round (Group B)	(Croatia) Jug Dubrovnik	7-11	6-9	4th place
2011-12	Champions League	Preliminary round (Group B)	(Germany) Spandau 04	6-6	8-9	4th place
2011-12	Champions League	Preliminary round (Group B)	(Croatia) HAVK Mladost	11-11	9-14	4th place
2012-13	Champions League	Preliminary round (Group C)	(Spain) Barceloneta	4-9	5-7	5th place
2012-13	Champions League	Preliminary round (Group C)	(France) Marseille	10-9	7-13	5th place
2012-13	Champions League	Preliminary round (Group C)	(Italy) Brescia	7-9	9-13	5th place
2012-13	Champions League	Preliminary round (Group C)	(Russia) Sintez Kazan	6-6	10-9	5th place
2013-14	Euro Cup	elimination in qualifying round				
2014-15	Euro Cup	elimination in Second qualifying round				
2021-22	Euro Cup	elimination in First qualifying round				

== Current squad ==
- Miloš Marinković
- Vojislav Mitrović
- Vladimir Čukić
- Nemanja Ubović
- Miloš Miličić
- Nemanja Matković
- Marko Ovuka
- Dušan Vasić
- Srđan Vuksanović
- Luka Petić
- Franko Geratović
- Aleksandar Njegovan
- Marko Crvenko
- Stefan Roganović
- Miloš Maksimović
- Dragoljub Rogač
- Nenad Bosančić
- Vladan Mitrović

== Famous players ==
- Boris Vapenski
- Petar Ivošević
- Nemanja Ubović
- Aleksandar Njegovan
- Duško Pijetlović
- Miloš Ćuk
- Gojko Pijetlović
