= VK Novi Beograd =

Men's professional water polo club in Belgrade, Serbia

- Official logo
- Nicknames: Wolves
- Sport: Water polo
- Founded: 2015; 11 years ago
- League: Serbian Super League; VRL Premier League; Champions League
- Based in: New Belgrade, Serbia
- Stadium: SC 11. april
- Colors
- Managing director: Goran Mandić
- Head coach: Petar Radovanović
- Website: novibeogradklub.rs

VK Novi Beograd (Serbian Cyrillic: ВК Нови Београд), or Novi Beograd Tehnomanija (for sponsorship reasons), is a professional water polo club based in New Belgrade, Serbia. As of 2026–27 season, the club competes in the Serbian Super League, the regional VRL Premier League, and the Champions League.

== History ==
The club was founded in 2015, by Serbian politician and former water polo player Aleksandar Šapić. In 2020–21 season, the club made its debut in top-tier Serbian Water Polo League A, where they finished as runners-up. Also, they made the semi-finals of the Serbian Water Polo Cup. In second-tier European competition LEN Euro Cup, Novi Beograd made it to the eight-finals.

In 2021–22 season, the club significantly improved its roster, and made debut in the Regional League and LEN Champions League. Also, Novi Beograd was named as host of LEN Champions League final tournament from 2021 to 2023. After coming up short in the Serbian Water Polo Cup, losing to VK Radnički Kragujevac in the final game, Novi Beograd eventually won the Regional League in 2021–22 by defeating the VK Jadran Split with 14–11 in the final game, securing their first trophy in history. Duško Pijetlović was named the MVP of the final tournament. It was also only the second trophy for the Serbian clubs in the competition's history. Novi Beograd won the 2021–22 Serbian Water Polo League A as well. Novi Beograd finished their most successful season in club's history by losing in the final of 2021–22 LEN Champions League to Pro Recco on penalties.

In 2022–23 season, Novi Beograd managed to defend the national championship, but was eliminated in the Regional League in semifinals, and was a runner-up in the Serbian Cup competiotion and the LEN Champions League. In 2023–24 season, Novi Beograd was triple-champion, having been crowned the Serbian League champion, the Regional League champion (for the second time) and Serbian Cup champion.

== Current squad ==
VK Novi Beograd squad as of 2025–26 season:

Player	Note
Miloš Ćuk	Captain
Pavle Gavrilović	GK
Milan Glušac	GK
Petar Pajković	GK
Luka Pljevančić	
Đuro Radović	
Luka Gladović	
Filip Janković	
Dušan Trtović	
Marko Dimitrijević	
Miroslav Perković	
Vasilije Martinović	Vice-captain
Nikola Lukić (water polo)	
Goran Grgurević	
Petar Vujošević	
Filip Ćorić	
Vuk Milojević	
Mitar Maraš	
Petar Radanović	Head coach
Čedomir Drašković	Ass. coach

== Season by season ==
Season	Tier	League	VRL Regional	RWP Regional	Domestic cup	European competitions	
2025–26	1	Runners-up	5th place		Champions	1 Champions League	QF
2024–25	1	Runners-up		Semi-finalist	Champions	1 LEN Champions League	Runners-up
2023–24	1	Champions		Champions	Champions	1 LEN Champions League	4th place
2022–23	1	Champions		Semi-finalist	Runners-up	1 LEN Champions League	Runners-up
2021–22	1	Champions		Champions	Runners-up	1 LEN Champions League	Runners-up
2020–21	1	Runners-up		-	SF	2 LEN Euro Cup	Eight–finals
2019–20	2	CX		-	QF	-	
2018–19	2	2nd place		-	-	-	
2017–18	2	10th place		-	-	-	
2016–17	2	6th place		-	-	-	

=== In European competition ===
Note: Updated as of 2022-23 season.

- Participations in Champions League: 3x
- Participations in Euro Cup: 1x

Season	Competition	Round	Club	Home	Away	Aggregate
2020-21	Euro Cup	Round of 16	(Greece) Vouliagmeni	7-7	8-9	15–16
2021-22	Champions League; Finalist	Preliminary round (Group A)	(Hungary) Ferencváros	11-14	10-11	3rd place
2021-22	Champions League; Finalist	Preliminary round (Group A)	(Greece) Olympiacos	9-12	12-12	3rd place
2021-22	Champions League; Finalist	Preliminary round (Group A)	(Spain) Barceloneta	11-9	12-12	3rd place
2021-22	Champions League; Finalist	Preliminary round (Group A)	(Serbia) Radnički Kragujevac	16-10	13-11	3rd place
2021-22	Champions League; Finalist	Preliminary round (Group A)	(Georgia (country)) Dinamo Tbilisi	19-7	17-8	3rd place
2021-22	Champions League; Finalist	Preliminary round (Group A)	(Italy) Brescia	11-11	16-13	3rd place
2021-22	Champions League; Finalist	Preliminary round (Group A)	(Croatia) Jadran Split	14-7	17-12	3rd place
2021-22	Champions League; Finalist	Quarter-final (F8)	(France) Marseille	16–10		
2021-22	Champions League; Finalist	Semi-final (F8)	(Italy) Brescia	14–13		
2021-22	Champions League; Finalist	Final (F8)	(Italy) Pro Recco	13–13 (3–4 p)		
2022-23	Champions League; Finalist	Preliminary round (Group B)	(Hungary) Ferencváros	14-13	12-14	2nd place
2022-23	Champions League; Finalist	Preliminary round (Group B)	(France) Marseille	11-4	17-13	2nd place
2022-23	Champions League; Finalist	Preliminary round (Group B)	(Croatia) Jug Dubrovnik	12-12	11-11	2nd place
2022-23	Champions League; Finalist	Preliminary round (Group B)	(Spain) Sabadell	16-11	8-6	2nd place
2022-23	Champions League; Finalist	Preliminary round (Group B)	(Germany) Spandau 04	13-8	16-5	2nd place
2022-23	Champions League; Finalist	Preliminary round (Group B)	(Hungary) Orvosegyetem SC	17-9	11-9	2nd place
2022-23	Champions League; Finalist	Preliminary round (Group B)	(Italy) Brescia	11-9	9-12	2nd place
2022-23	Champions League; Finalist	Quarter-final (F8)	(Greece) Olympiacos	13–11		
2022-23	Champions League; Finalist	Semi-final (F8)	(Spain) Barceloneta	8–8 (4–2 p)		
2022-23	Champions League; Finalist	Final (F8)	(Italy) Pro Recco	11–14		

== Honours ==
=== Domestic competitions ===
- National Championship
  - Winners (3): 2021–22, 2022–23, 2023–24
  - Runners-up (3) : 2020–21, 2024–25, 2025–26
- National Cup
  - Winners (3): 2023–24, 2024–25, 2025–26
  - Runners-up (2) : 2021–22, 2022–23

=== Regional competitions ===
- Regional League
  - Winners (2): 2021–22, 2023–24

=== European competitions ===
- Champions League
  - Runners-up (3) : 2021–22, 2022–23, 2024–25
