= Regional Water Polo League =

Southeastern European professional water polo league

- Sport: Water polo
- Founded: 2008; 18 years ago
- Folded: 2025; 1 year ago
- No. of teams: 8
- Country: Croatia; Italy; Montenegro; Serbia; Slovenia
- Continent: European Aquatics (Europe)
- Last champions: Radnički (2nd title) (2024–25)
- Most titles: Jug (5 titles)
- Broadcaster: Arena Sport
- Level on pyramid: 1
- Domestic cup: No

The Regional Water Polo League (Serbo-Croatian: Regionalna vaterpolo liga, RVL), commonly known as the Regional League or Adriatic League, was a regional water polo league in Southeast Europe. Originally, the league featured clubs from Croatia, Montenegro, and Slovenia. In later years, clubs from Serbia joined the league and in one season club from Italy participated in the league. As of 2025–26 season, the league was suspended due to various reasons.

== History ==
The league was established in 2008 as the Adriatic Water Polo League (Serbo-Croatian: Jadranska vaterpolo liga) and the inaugural 2008–09 season consisted of clubs from Croatia, Montenegro and Slovenia. Members of the inaugural season were Jug, Mladost, Primorje, POŠK, Jadran Split, Medveščak Zagreb, Šibenik, Mornar, Jadran, Primorac, Budva, and Koper. The first league champions were VK Jug.

In the 2009–10 season, Cattaro joined the league and the Final Four was introduced into the league. In the 2011–12 season, the Italian water polo club Pro Recco request to join the Adriatic League was granted and immediately in their first season they became champions, but left the league after the season. The Serbian clubs (Partizan, Crvena zvezda, Radnički and Vojvodina) joined the league in the 2014–15 season.

Starting from the 2015–16 season, second-tier Regional League A2 was introduced.

In February 2019, three team members of Serbian club Crvena zvezda were attacked in Split by Croatian ultra-nationalists, before regional league game against Mornar. The incident was condemned by Croatian and Serbian public, and by many organizations and officials as well. Following the incident, the Water Polo Federation of Serbia and Serbian clubs in competition sought to not play any further games in Split, and competition's Board of Directors made a decision to postpone any further games in Split in which Serbian clubs are included.

Starting with the 2020–21 season, the league is played in different format due to the COVID-19 pandemic, having two groups (2020–21 season with host cities being Belgrade and Dubrovnik, and 2021–22 season with host cities Belgrade and Split) and final tournament (2020–21 host being Zagreb, and 2021–22 host being Belgrade); In 2020–21 season, the Serbian club Radnički eventually won their first championship, thus ending 8-year dominance of the Croatian clubs. In 2021–22 season, the newcomer to the competition, Novi Beograd, lifted its maiden trophy.

In the 2025–26 season, the Regional Water Polo League was not held in its previous format after an agreement could not be reached between the clubs and national federations on the format of the competition. One of the outstanding issues in the negotiations was the hosting of Croatian clubs in Kotor, at the Zoran Džimi Gopčević swimming pool. The Croatian side opposed playing at the venue because of its name. The Croatian Ministry of Tourism and Sports had previously recommended that Croatian clubs and the national team not play at the Kotor venue until the issue concerning its name was resolved. The venue is named after Zoran "Džimi" Gopčević, a former Primorac water polo player and Yugoslav national team member. The Croatian side associated him with service as a guard at the Morinj camp during the war in Croatia, while Montenegrin sources emphasize his sporting legacy and his long-standing contribution to water polo in Kotor and Montenegro.

Perica Bukić, Executive Vice-President of the Croatian Water Polo Federation and President of the Regional League Board, stated that the issue of Croatian clubs playing in Kotor represented an additional problem, alongside disagreements over the proposed competition format and the congested schedule due to the 2026 European Championship in Belgrade. It was subsequently decided that the Regional League would be suspended in its previous format for the 2025–26 season, while Serbia and Montenegro agreed to organize a separate regional competition.

== Clubs ==
Location of clubs in the 2024–25 season.
Red: Regional Water Polo League Clubs

Clubs that participated in the 2024–25 season:

Regional Water Polo League

Club	City
(Croatia) Jug	Dubrovnik
(Croatia) Mladost	Zagreb
(Montenegro) Jadran	Herceg Novi
(Serbia) Šabac	Šabac
(Serbia) Novi Beograd	Belgrade
(Serbia) Valis	Valjevo
(Serbia) Radnički	Kragujevac
(Croatia) Jadran	Split
(Serbia) Crvena zvezda	Belgrade
(Croatia) Solaris	Šibenik
(Croatia) Primorje	Rijeka
(Montenegro) Primorac	Kotor

== All-time participants ==
The following is a list of clubs who have played in the Regional Water Polo League at any time since its formation in 2008 to the current season. A total of 22 clubs from five countries have played in the top-tier of the Regional League.

–	Played in second-tier division (established 2015–16)
1st	Champions
2nd	Runners-up
3rd	Third place
SF	Semi-finalists
^{R}	Regular season champions

Club	09	10	11	12	13	14	15	16	17	18	19	20	21	22	23	24	25	Total seasons	Highest finish			
Club	(Slovenia) Branik Maribor	—	—	—	—	—	12th	15th	—	—	—	—	—	—	—	—	—	Total seasons	Highest finish	—	2	12th
(Montenegro) Budva	5th	5th	5th	7th	4th	6th	11th	—	7th	9th	—	8th	12th	13th	—	—	—	12	4th			
(Montenegro) Cattaro	—	6th	12th	—	—	—	—	—	—	—	—	—	—	—	—	—	—	2	6th			
(Serbia) Crvena zvezda	Restricted						8th	10th	—	—	7th	5th	5th	6th	6th	5th	10th	9	5th			
(Croatia) Jadran Split	9th	10th	10th	12th	7th	9th	12th	—	8th	SF	SF	SF	3rd	2nd	2nd	2nd	2nd	16	2nd			
(Montenegro) Jadran Herceg Novi	2nd	1st	1st	5th	8th	SF	5th	SF	2nd	SF	SF	SF	6th	5th	8th	4th	SF^{R}	17	1st			
(Croatia) Jug	1st	2nd^{R}	2nd	3rd	2nd	2nd	2nd	1st^{R}	1st^{R}	1st^{R}	2nd	2nd	2nd^{R}	3rd	1st	3rd	8th	17	1st			
(Slovenia) Koper	10th	13th	8th	11th	—	—	—	—	—	—	—	—	—	—	—	—	—	4	8th			
(Croatia) Medveščak	11th	11th	9th	9th	10th	10th	14th	—	—	—	—	—	—	—	—	—	—	7	9th			
(Croatia) Mladost	4th	4th	4th	4th	3rd	3rd	SF	SF	SF	2nd	1st^{R}	1st^{R}	4th	9th	5th	9th	5th	17	1st			
(Croatia) Mornar	8th	8th	7th	6th	5th	5th	7th	6th	6th	5th	6th	10th	—	12th	10th	11th	—	15	5th			
(Serbia) Novi Beograd	Unfounded							—	—	—	—	—	—	1st^{R}	SF^{R}	1st^{R}	SF	4	1st			
(Serbia) Partizan	Restricted						6th	5th	SF	6th	9th	9th	10th	7th	9th	12th	—	10	SF			
(Croatia) POŠK	12th	12th	13th	8th	6th	8th	10th	9th	—	7th	10th	—	—	—	—	—	—	10	6th			
(Montenegro) Primorac	3rd	3rd	6th	10th	9th	7th	13th	—	—	8th	8th	6th	9th	8th	12th	—	7th	14	3rd			
(Croatia) Primorje	7th	7th	3rd	2nd	1st	1st	1st^{R}	2nd	5th	10th	—	—	11th	—	—	7th	9th	13	1st			
(Italy) Pro Recco	Restricted			1st	Restricted													1	1st			
(Serbia) Radnički	Unfounded				Restricted		SF	7th	—	—	—	—	1st	4th	SF	6th	1st	7	1st			
(Croatia) Solaris	6th	9th	11th	13th	12th	11th	—	—	—	—	—	—	8th	10th	11th	8th	11th	11	6th			
(Serbia) Šabac	Restricted						—	—	—	—	5th	7th	7th	11th	7th	10th	6th	7	5th			
(Slovenia) Triglav Kranj	—	—	—	—	11th	—	—	—	—	—	—	—	—	—	—	—	—	1	11th			
(Serbia) Valis	Restricted						—	—	—	—	—	—	—	—	—	—	12th	1	12th			
(Serbia) Vojvodina	Restricted						9th	8th	9th	—	—	—	—	—	—	—	—	3	8th			

== Finals ==
Season	Champions	Runners-up	Result	1st of Regular Season
2008–09	(Croatia) Jug	(Montenegro) Jadran Herceg Novi	–^{note}	(Croatia) Jug
2009–10	(Montenegro) Jadran Herceg Novi	(Croatia) Jug	11–8	(Croatia) Jug (2)
2010–11	(Montenegro) Jadran Herceg Novi (2)	(Croatia) Jug	9–7	(Montenegro) Jadran
2011–12	(Italy) Pro Recco	(Croatia) Primorje	15–4	(Italy) Pro Recco
2012–13	(Croatia) Primorje	(Croatia) Jug	9–8	(Croatia) Primorje
2013–14	(Croatia) Primorje (2)	(Croatia) Jug	8–7	(Croatia) Primorje (2)
2014–15	(Croatia) Primorje (3)	(Croatia) Jug	15–9	(Croatia) Primorje (3)
2015–16	(Croatia) Jug (2)	(Croatia) Primorje	9–5	(Croatia) Jug (3)
2016–17	(Croatia) Jug (3)	(Montenegro) Jadran	15–3	(Croatia) Jug (4)
2017–18	(Croatia) Jug (4)	(Croatia) Mladost	15–8	(Croatia) Jug (5)
2018–19	(Croatia) Mladost	(Croatia) Jug	13–12	(Croatia) Mladost
2019–20	(Croatia) Mladost (2)	(Croatia) Jug	15–11	(Croatia) Jug (6)
2020–21	(Serbia) Radnički	(Croatia) Jug	14–12	(Croatia) Jug (7)
2021–22	(Serbia) Novi Beograd	(Croatia) Jadran Split	14–11	(Serbia) Novi Beograd
2022–23	(Croatia) Jug (5)	(Croatia) Jadran Split	14–12	(Serbia) Novi Beograd (2)
2023–24	(Serbia) Novi Beograd (2)	(Croatia) Jadran Split	16–14	(Serbia) Novi Beograd (3)
2024–25	(Serbia) Radnički (2)	(Croatia) Jadran Split	13–10	(Montenegro) Jadran Herceg Novi (2)

^{note} The league was played in a round-robin tournament format.

== Awards ==
Season	MVP	Top Scorer
2008–09	(Montenegro) Aleksandar Ivović (Jadran Herceg Novi)	
2009–10	(Montenegro) Aleksandar Ivović (Jadran Herceg Novi)	
2010–11	(Hungary) Denes Varga (Primorje)	(Hungary) Denes Varga (Primorje) (Croatia) Sandro Sukno (Primorje)
2011–12	(Serbia) Filip Filipović (Pro Recco)	(Montenegro) Darko Brguljan (Budva)
2012–13	(Croatia) Sandro Sukno (Primorje)	(Montenegro) Aleksandar Ivović (Jug)
2013–14	(Croatia) Paulo Obradović (Primorje)	(Hungary) Denes Varga (Primorje Rijeka)
2014–15	(Croatia) Sandro Sukno (Primorje)	
2015–16	(Spain) Felipe Perrone (Jug)	
2016–17	(Croatia) Luka Loncar (Jug)	(Croatia) Paulo Obradović (Jug)
2017–18	(Croatia) Marko Macan (Jug)	(Croatia) Luka Bukić (Jug)
2018–19	(Romania) Cosmin Radu (Mladost)	(Russia) Daniil Merkulov (Jug)
2019–20	(Croatia) Luka Bukić (Mladost)	
2020–21	(Serbia) Lazar Dobožanov (Radnički)	(Russia) Daniil Merkulov (Jug)
2021–22	(Serbia) Duško Pijetlović (Novi Beograd)	(Serbia) Nikola Lukić (Radnički)
2022–23	(Croatia) Toni Popadić (Jug)	(Croatia) Loren Fatovic (Jug)
2023–24	(Spain) Álvaro Granados (Novi Beograd)	
2024–25	(Georgia (country)) Valiko Dadvani (Radnički)	

== Records and statistics ==
=== Performance by clubs ===
Club	Winners	Runners-up	Years won	Years runners-up
(Croatia) Jug	5	8	2008–09, 2015–16, 2016–17, 2017–18, 2022–23	2009–10, 2010–11, 2012–13, 2013–14, 2014–15, 2018–19, 2019–20, 2020–21
(Croatia) Primorje	3	2	2012–13, 2013–14, 2014–15	2011–12, 2015–16
(Montenegro) Jadran Herceg Novi	2	2	2009–10, 2010–11	2008–09, 2016–17
(Croatia) Mladost	2	1	2018–19, 2019–20	2017–18
(Serbia) Novi Beograd	2	0	2021–22, 2023–24	
(Serbia) Radnički	2	0	2020–21, 2024–25	
(Italy) Pro Recco	1	0	2011–12	
(Croatia) Jadran Split	0	4		2021–22, 2022–23, 2023–24, 2024–25

=== By country ===
Club / Nation	Won	Runners-up
Croatia	10	15
Serbia	4	0
Montenegro	2	2
Italy	1	0

== See also ==
- Euro Interliga
- VRL Water Polo League
