= 2012 Men's European Water Polo Championship =

Tournament details
- Host country: Netherlands
- Venue: 1 (in 1 host city)
- Dates: 16–29 January
- Teams: 12 (from 1 confederation)

Final positions
- Champions: Serbia
- Runners-up: Montenegro
- Third place: Hungary
- Fourth place: Italy

Tournament statistics
- Matches played: 44

The 2012 Men's European Water Polo Championship took place at the Pieter van den Hoogenband Swim Stadium in Eindhoven, the Netherlands, from 16 to 29 January 2012.

== Road to the 2012 Olympics ==
The championships was part of the qualification procedure for the 2012 London Olympics that will take place in late July and early August of that year. There will be 12 men's teams in the Olympic competition.

By the time that these championships take place, four men's places have already been booked: the winner of the 2011 FINA Men's Water Polo World League in Italy (Serbia), and the three top-placed teams in the 2011 World Championships in Shanghai that did not win the World League (Italy, Croatia, Hungary).

As Great Britain men's team has been entered into the Olympic competition, there was not a direct entry to the Olympic tournament from the European Championships. Five teams will be entered into a world-wide qualifying competition from 1–8 April 2012 for men in Edmonton, Alberta, Canada and from 15 to 22 April for women in Italy. Four teams from this competition qualified for the Olympic tournament.

== Qualification ==
12 teams were allowed to the tournament. The qualification was as follows:

- The host nation
- The best 5 teams from the 2010 European Championships not already qualified as the host nation
- 6 teams from the Qualifiers

| Event | Date | Location | Vacancies | Qualified |
|---|---|---|---|---|
| Host nation | - | – | 1 | Netherlands |
| 2010 European Championships | 28 August–11 September 2010 | (Croatia) Zagreb | 5 | Croatia; Italy; Serbia; Hungary; Montenegro |
| Qualifiers | 1 October 2010 – 1 August 2011 | Various | 6 | Germany; Romania; Spain; Greece; Turkey; North Macedonia |

== Draw ==
The draw was held on 12 November 2011.

=== Groups ===
| Group A | Group B |
|---|---|
| North Macedonia; Greece; Hungary; Italy; Netherlands; Turkey | Serbia; Germany; Croatia; Romania; Montenegro; Spain |

== Preliminary round ==
=== Group A ===
| Pos | Team | Pld | W | D | L | GF | GA | GD | Pts | Qualification |
|---|---|---|---|---|---|---|---|---|---|---|
| 1 | Hungary | 5 | 5 | 0 | 0 | 76 | 32 | +44 | 15 | Semifinals |
| 2 | Italy | 5 | 4 | 0 | 1 | 71 | 37 | +34 | 12 | Quarterfinals |
| 3 | Greece | 5 | 3 | 0 | 2 | 58 | 39 | +19 | 9 | Quarterfinals |
| 4 | Netherlands | 5 | 2 | 0 | 3 | 46 | 62 | −16 | 6 | 7th–10th places |
| 5 | North Macedonia | 5 | 1 | 0 | 4 | 44 | 53 | −9 | 3 | 7th–12th places |
| 6 | Turkey | 5 | 0 | 0 | 5 | 22 | 94 | −72 | 0 | 7th–12th places |

Updated to match(es) played on unknown. Source:

| 16 January 2012; 13:00 | Report | North Macedonia | 16–4 | Turkey | Pieter van den Hoogenband Zwemstadion, Eindhoven; Attendance: 150; Referees: Golijanin (SRB), Teixido (ESP) |
| 16 January 2012; 13:00 | Report | Score by quarters: 3–1, 2–0, 6–0, 5–3 | | | Pieter van den Hoogenband Zwemstadion, Eindhoven; Attendance: 150; Referees: Golijanin (SRB), Teixido (ESP) |
| 16 January 2012; 13:00 | Report | Ranđić, Letica 4 | Goals | Hantal 2 | Pieter van den Hoogenband Zwemstadion, Eindhoven; Attendance: 150; Referees: Golijanin (SRB), Teixido (ESP) |

| 16 January 2012; 19:45 | Report | Greece | 14–12 | Netherlands | Pieter van den Hoogenband Zwemstadion, Eindhoven; Attendance: 800; Referees: Spiegel (GER), Alexandrescu (ROU) |
| 16 January 2012; 19:45 | Report | Score by quarters: 4–3, 5–3, 2–3, 3–3 | | | Pieter van den Hoogenband Zwemstadion, Eindhoven; Attendance: 800; Referees: Spiegel (GER), Alexandrescu (ROU) |
| 16 January 2012; 19:45 | Report | Miralis 4 | Goals | Gottemaker 3 | Pieter van den Hoogenband Zwemstadion, Eindhoven; Attendance: 800; Referees: Spiegel (GER), Alexandrescu (ROU) |

| 16 January 2012; 21:15 | Report | Hungary | 12–8 | Italy | Pieter van den Hoogenband Zwemstadion, Eindhoven; Attendance: 750; Referees: Brguljan (MNE), Buch (ESP) |
| 16 January 2012; 21:15 | Report | Score by quarters: 2–3, 5–0, 4–3, 1–2 | | | Pieter van den Hoogenband Zwemstadion, Eindhoven; Attendance: 750; Referees: Brguljan (MNE), Buch (ESP) |
| 16 January 2012; 21:15 | Report | four players 2 | Goals | Figlioli, Aicardi 2 | Pieter van den Hoogenband Zwemstadion, Eindhoven; Attendance: 750; Referees: Brguljan (MNE), Buch (ESP) |

| 17 January 2012; 13:00 | Report | North Macedonia | 6–10 | Greece | Pieter van den Hoogenband Zwemstadion, Eindhoven; Attendance: 250; Referees: Koryzna (POL), Teixidó (ESP) |
| 17 January 2012; 13:00 | Report | Score by quarters: 0–2, 1–3, 1–1, 4–4 | | | Pieter van den Hoogenband Zwemstadion, Eindhoven; Attendance: 250; Referees: Koryzna (POL), Teixidó (ESP) |
| 17 January 2012; 13:00 | Report | Mišić 2 | Goals | Miralis 4 | Pieter van den Hoogenband Zwemstadion, Eindhoven; Attendance: 250; Referees: Koryzna (POL), Teixidó (ESP) |

| 17 January 2012; 19:00 | Report | Netherlands | 6–19 | Hungary | Pieter van den Hoogenband Zwemstadion, Eindhoven; Attendance: 900; Referees: Grandin (FRA), Periš (CRO) |
| 17 January 2012; 19:00 | Report | Score by quarters: 2–2, 1–4, 2–5, 1–8 | | | Pieter van den Hoogenband Zwemstadion, Eindhoven; Attendance: 900; Referees: Grandin (FRA), Periš (CRO) |
| 17 January 2012; 19:00 | Report | Kramer, Gottemaker 2 | Goals | Kiss 5 | Pieter van den Hoogenband Zwemstadion, Eindhoven; Attendance: 900; Referees: Grandin (FRA), Periš (CRO) |

| 17 January 2012; 20:30 | Report | Turkey | 7–24 | Italy | Pieter van den Hoogenband Zwemstadion, Eindhoven; Attendance: 300; Referees: Golijanin (SRB), Levin (ISR) |
| 17 January 2012; 20:30 | Report | Score by quarters: 2–7, 1–4, 3–6, 1–7 | | | Pieter van den Hoogenband Zwemstadion, Eindhoven; Attendance: 300; Referees: Golijanin (SRB), Levin (ISR) |
| 17 January 2012; 20:30 | Report | Okman 3 | Goals | Aicardi 4 | Pieter van den Hoogenband Zwemstadion, Eindhoven; Attendance: 300; Referees: Golijanin (SRB), Levin (ISR) |

| 19 January 2012; 13:00 | Report | Hungary | 14–9 | North Macedonia | Pieter van den Hoogenband Zwemstadion, Eindhoven; Attendance: 350; Referees: Alexandrescu (ROU), Brguljan (MNE) |
| 19 January 2012; 13:00 | Report | Score by quarters: 4–2, 4–4, 2–1, 4–2 | | | Pieter van den Hoogenband Zwemstadion, Eindhoven; Attendance: 350; Referees: Alexandrescu (ROU), Brguljan (MNE) |
| 19 January 2012; 13:00 | Report | Varga, Madaras 3 | Goals | Kalinić 2 | Pieter van den Hoogenband Zwemstadion, Eindhoven; Attendance: 350; Referees: Alexandrescu (ROU), Brguljan (MNE) |

| 19 January 2012; 14:30 | Report | Greece | 20–2 | Turkey | Pieter van den Hoogenband Zwemstadion, Eindhoven; Attendance: 250; Referees: Periš (CRO), Detko (GBR) |
| 19 January 2012; 14:30 | Report | Score by quarters: 1–0, 6–0, 4–2, 9–0 | | | Pieter van den Hoogenband Zwemstadion, Eindhoven; Attendance: 250; Referees: Periš (CRO), Detko (GBR) |
| 19 January 2012; 14:30 | Report | Miralis 4 | Goals | Çağatay 2 | Pieter van den Hoogenband Zwemstadion, Eindhoven; Attendance: 250; Referees: Periš (CRO), Detko (GBR) |

| 19 January 2012; 19:00 | Report | Italy | 14–6 | Netherlands | Pieter van den Hoogenband Zwemstadion, Eindhoven; Attendance: 1,200; Referees: Spiegel (GER), Buch (ESP) |
| 19 January 2012; 19:00 | Report | Score by quarters: 3–2, 4–2, 5–1, 2–1 | | | Pieter van den Hoogenband Zwemstadion, Eindhoven; Attendance: 1,200; Referees: Spiegel (GER), Buch (ESP) |
| 19 January 2012; 19:00 | Report | Giorgetti 5 | Goals | three players 2 | Pieter van den Hoogenband Zwemstadion, Eindhoven; Attendance: 1,200; Referees: Spiegel (GER), Buch (ESP) |

| 21 January 2012; 14:30 | Report | North Macedonia | 5–15 | Italy | Pieter van den Hoogenband Zwemstadion, Eindhoven; Attendance: 950; Referees: Brguljan (MNE), Periš (CRO) |
| 21 January 2012; 14:30 | Report | Score by quarters: 2–3, 1–2, 1–5, 1–5 | | | Pieter van den Hoogenband Zwemstadion, Eindhoven; Attendance: 950; Referees: Brguljan (MNE), Periš (CRO) |
| 21 January 2012; 14:30 | Report | five players 1 | Goals | Figlioli 4 | Pieter van den Hoogenband Zwemstadion, Eindhoven; Attendance: 950; Referees: Brguljan (MNE), Periš (CRO) |

| 21 January 2012; 16:00 | Report | Turkey | 7–12 | Netherlands | Pieter van den Hoogenband Zwemstadion, Eindhoven; Attendance: 1,500; Referees: Spiegel (GER), Teixidó (ESP) |
| 21 January 2012; 16:00 | Report | Score by quarters: 2–3, 3–6, 2–2, 0–1 | | | Pieter van den Hoogenband Zwemstadion, Eindhoven; Attendance: 1,500; Referees: Spiegel (GER), Teixidó (ESP) |
| 21 January 2012; 16:00 | Report | Hantal 3 | Goals | Gerritse 4 | Pieter van den Hoogenband Zwemstadion, Eindhoven; Attendance: 1,500; Referees: Spiegel (GER), Teixidó (ESP) |

| 21 January 2012; 19:00 | Report | Greece | 7–9 | Hungary | Pieter van den Hoogenband Zwemstadion, Eindhoven; Attendance: 1,200; Referees: Buch (ESP), Golijanin (SRB) |
| 21 January 2012; 19:00 | Report | Score by quarters: 1–2, 2–4, 3–2, 1–1 | | | Pieter van den Hoogenband Zwemstadion, Eindhoven; Attendance: 1,200; Referees: Buch (ESP), Golijanin (SRB) |
| 21 January 2012; 19:00 | Report | Theodoropoulos 3 | Goals | Kiss, Biros 2 | Pieter van den Hoogenband Zwemstadion, Eindhoven; Attendance: 1,200; Referees: Buch (ESP), Golijanin (SRB) |

| 23 January 2012; 14:30 | Report | Turkey | 2–22 | Hungary | Pieter van den Hoogenband Zwemstadion, Eindhoven; Attendance: 250; Referees: Mauss (GER), Detko (GBR) |
| 23 January 2012; 14:30 | Report | Score by quarters: 0–6, 1–6, 0–4, 1–6 | | | Pieter van den Hoogenband Zwemstadion, Eindhoven; Attendance: 250; Referees: Mauss (GER), Detko (GBR) |
| 23 January 2012; 14:30 | Report | Hantal 2 | Goals | Hárai 4 | Pieter van den Hoogenband Zwemstadion, Eindhoven; Attendance: 250; Referees: Mauss (GER), Detko (GBR) |

| 23 January 2012; 19:00 | Report | North Macedonia | 8–10 | Netherlands | Pieter van den Hoogenband Zwemstadion, Eindhoven; Attendance: 1,200; Referees: Buch (ESP), Vasileiou (GRE) |
| 23 January 2012; 19:00 | Report | Score by quarters: 4–2, 0–2, 2–3, 2–3 | | | Pieter van den Hoogenband Zwemstadion, Eindhoven; Attendance: 1,200; Referees: Buch (ESP), Vasileiou (GRE) |
| 23 January 2012; 19:00 | Report | Kalinić 4 | Goals | Gerritse 3 | Pieter van den Hoogenband Zwemstadion, Eindhoven; Attendance: 1,200; Referees: Buch (ESP), Vasileiou (GRE) |

| 23 January 2012; 20:30 | Report | Italy | 10–7 | Greece | Pieter van den Hoogenband Zwemstadion, Eindhoven; Attendance: 1,000; Referees: Koryzna (POL), Koganov (AZE) |
| 23 January 2012; 20:30 | Report | Score by quarters: 2–3, 5–1, 1–2, 2–1 | | | Pieter van den Hoogenband Zwemstadion, Eindhoven; Attendance: 1,000; Referees: Koryzna (POL), Koganov (AZE) |
| 23 January 2012; 20:30 | Report | Figlioli, Giorgetti 2 | Goals | Miralis, Ntoskas 3 | Pieter van den Hoogenband Zwemstadion, Eindhoven; Attendance: 1,000; Referees: Koryzna (POL), Koganov (AZE) |

=== Group B ===
| Pos | Team | Pld | W | D | L | GF | GA | GD | Pts | Qualification |
|---|---|---|---|---|---|---|---|---|---|---|
| 1 | Serbia | 5 | 4 | 0 | 1 | 57 | 45 | +12 | 12 | Semifinals |
| 2 | Montenegro | 5 | 3 | 1 | 1 | 53 | 42 | +11 | 10 | Quarterfinals |
| 3 | Germany | 5 | 3 | 0 | 2 | 55 | 54 | +1 | 9 | Quarterfinals |
| 4 | Croatia | 5 | 3 | 0 | 2 | 52 | 50 | +2 | 9 | 7th–10th places |
| 5 | Spain | 5 | 1 | 1 | 3 | 47 | 55 | −8 | 4 | 7th–12th places |
| 6 | Romania | 5 | 0 | 0 | 5 | 39 | 57 | −18 | 0 | 7th–12th places |

Updated to match(es) played on unknown. Source:

| 16 January 2012; 14:30 | Report | Croatia | 10–7 | Romania | Pieter van den Hoogenband Zwemstadion, Eindhoven; Attendance: 250; Referees: Gomez (ITA), Taylan (TUR) |
| 16 January 2012; 14:30 | Report | Score by quarters: 2–1, 3–2, 2–1, 3–3 | | | Pieter van den Hoogenband Zwemstadion, Eindhoven; Attendance: 250; Referees: Gomez (ITA), Taylan (TUR) |
| 16 January 2012; 14:30 | Report | Bošković 3 | Goals | Georgescu 2 | Pieter van den Hoogenband Zwemstadion, Eindhoven; Attendance: 250; Referees: Gomez (ITA), Taylan (TUR) |

| 16 January 2012; 16:00 | Report | Germany | 7–13 | Montenegro | Pieter van den Hoogenband Zwemstadion, Eindhoven; Attendance: 350; Referees: Levin (ISR), Sadekov (RUS) |
| 16 January 2012; 16:00 | Report | Score by quarters: 1–4, 2–1, 2–3, 2–5 | | | Pieter van den Hoogenband Zwemstadion, Eindhoven; Attendance: 350; Referees: Levin (ISR), Sadekov (RUS) |
| 16 January 2012; 16:00 | Report | Paul Schüler 3 | Goals | Janović 5 | Pieter van den Hoogenband Zwemstadion, Eindhoven; Attendance: 350; Referees: Levin (ISR), Sadekov (RUS) |

| 16 January 2012; 17:30 | Report | Serbia | 8–5 | Spain | Pieter van den Hoogenband Zwemstadion, Eindhoven; Attendance: 500; Referees: Koryzna (POL), Vasileiou (GRE) |
| 16 January 2012; 17:30 | Report | Score by quarters: 1–0, 2–3, 3–1, 2–1 | | | Pieter van den Hoogenband Zwemstadion, Eindhoven; Attendance: 500; Referees: Koryzna (POL), Vasileiou (GRE) |
| 16 January 2012; 17:30 | Report | Udovičić 3 | Goals | Perrone 2 | Pieter van den Hoogenband Zwemstadion, Eindhoven; Attendance: 500; Referees: Koryzna (POL), Vasileiou (GRE) |

| 17 January 2012; 14:30 | Report | Serbia | 13–12 | Germany | Pieter van den Hoogenband Zwemstadion, Eindhoven; Attendance: 550; Referees: Koganov (AZE), Vogel (HUN) |
| 17 January 2012; 14:30 | Report | Score by quarters: 2–3, 5–2, 4–4, 2–3 | | | Pieter van den Hoogenband Zwemstadion, Eindhoven; Attendance: 550; Referees: Koganov (AZE), Vogel (HUN) |
| 17 January 2012; 14:30 | Report | Pijetlović 4 | Goals | Politze 4 | Pieter van den Hoogenband Zwemstadion, Eindhoven; Attendance: 550; Referees: Koganov (AZE), Vogel (HUN) |

| 17 January 2012; 16:00 | Report | Spain | 12–10 | Romania | Pieter van den Hoogenband Zwemstadion, Eindhoven; Attendance: 400; Referees: Bianchi (ITA), Bervoets (NED) |
| 17 January 2012; 16:00 | Report | Score by quarters: 4–4, 3–3, 3–2, 2–1 | | | Pieter van den Hoogenband Zwemstadion, Eindhoven; Attendance: 400; Referees: Bianchi (ITA), Bervoets (NED) |
| 17 January 2012; 16:00 | Report | Mallarach 4 | Goals | three players 2 | Pieter van den Hoogenband Zwemstadion, Eindhoven; Attendance: 400; Referees: Bianchi (ITA), Bervoets (NED) |

| 17 January 2012; 17:30 | Report | Montenegro | 8–10 | Croatia | Pieter van den Hoogenband Zwemstadion, Eindhoven; Attendance: 650; Referees: Vasileiou (GRE), Sadekov (RUS) |
| 17 January 2012; 17:30 | Report | Score by quarters: 2–3, 3–2, 3–3, 0–2 | | | Pieter van den Hoogenband Zwemstadion, Eindhoven; Attendance: 650; Referees: Vasileiou (GRE), Sadekov (RUS) |
| 17 January 2012; 17:30 | Report | three players 2 | Goals | Dobud 3 | Pieter van den Hoogenband Zwemstadion, Eindhoven; Attendance: 650; Referees: Vasileiou (GRE), Sadekov (RUS) |

| 19 January 2012; 16:00 | Report | Germany | 16–10 | Spain | Pieter van den Hoogenband Zwemstadion, Eindhoven; Attendance: 650; Referees: Fekete (HUN), Koryzna (POL) |
| 19 January 2012; 16:00 | Report | Score by quarters: 4–2, 5–4, 4–2, 3–2 | | | Pieter van den Hoogenband Zwemstadion, Eindhoven; Attendance: 650; Referees: Fekete (HUN), Koryzna (POL) |
| 19 January 2012; 16:00 | Report | Politze, Kreuzmann 4 | Goals | Perrone 3 | Pieter van den Hoogenband Zwemstadion, Eindhoven; Attendance: 650; Referees: Fekete (HUN), Koryzna (POL) |

Nikolaos Stavropoulos, Teixidó, Paul Schüler

| 19 January 2012; 17:30 | Report | Croatia | 12–15 | Serbia | Pieter van den Hoogenband Zwemstadion, Eindhoven; Attendance: 1,200; Referees: Bianchi (ITA), Levin (ISR) |
| 19 January 2012; 17:30 | Report | Score by quarters: 2–2, 4–6, 3–3, 3–4 | | | Pieter van den Hoogenband Zwemstadion, Eindhoven; Attendance: 1,200; Referees: Bianchi (ITA), Levin (ISR) |
| 19 January 2012; 17:30 | Report | Sukno 4 | Goals | Udovičić 3 | Pieter van den Hoogenband Zwemstadion, Eindhoven; Attendance: 1,200; Referees: Bianchi (ITA), Levin (ISR) |

| 19 January 2012; 20:30 | Report | Romania | 8–11 | Montenegro | Pieter van den Hoogenband Zwemstadion, Eindhoven; Attendance: 400; Referees: Taylan (TUR), Gomez (ITA) |
| 19 January 2012; 20:30 | Report | Score by quarters: 2–5, 2–3, 1–1, 3–2 | | | Pieter van den Hoogenband Zwemstadion, Eindhoven; Attendance: 400; Referees: Taylan (TUR), Gomez (ITA) |
| 19 January 2012; 20:30 | Report | Ghiban 3 | Goals | Janović 3 | Pieter van den Hoogenband Zwemstadion, Eindhoven; Attendance: 400; Referees: Taylan (TUR), Gomez (ITA) |

| 21 January 2012; 13:00 | Report | Serbia | 14–5 | Romania | Pieter van den Hoogenband Zwemstadion, Eindhoven; Attendance: 700; Referees: Taylan (TUR), Koryzna (POL) |
| 21 January 2012; 13:00 | Report | Score by quarters: 3–0, 4–0, 3–1, 4–4 | | | Pieter van den Hoogenband Zwemstadion, Eindhoven; Attendance: 700; Referees: Taylan (TUR), Koryzna (POL) |
| 21 January 2012; 13:00 | Report | Pijetlović 4 | Goals | Diaconu, Iosep 2 | Pieter van den Hoogenband Zwemstadion, Eindhoven; Attendance: 700; Referees: Taylan (TUR), Koryzna (POL) |

| 21 January 2012; 17:30 | Report | Spain | 10–10 | Montenegro | Pieter van den Hoogenband Zwemstadion, Eindhoven; Attendance: 1,100; Referees: Koganov (AZE), Levin (ISR) |
| 21 January 2012; 17:30 | Report | Score by quarters: 1–2, 4–3, 3–3, 2–2 | | | Pieter van den Hoogenband Zwemstadion, Eindhoven; Attendance: 1,100; Referees: Koganov (AZE), Levin (ISR) |
| 21 January 2012; 17:30 | Report | Español 4 | Goals | Janović 4 | Pieter van den Hoogenband Zwemstadion, Eindhoven; Attendance: 1,100; Referees: Koganov (AZE), Levin (ISR) |

| 21 January 2012; 20:30 | Report | Germany | 10–9 | Croatia | Pieter van den Hoogenband Zwemstadion, Eindhoven; Attendance: 900; Referees: Stavridis (GRE), Vogel (HUN) |
| 21 January 2012; 20:30 | Report | Score by quarters: 3–1, 4–2, 1–2, 2–4 | | | Pieter van den Hoogenband Zwemstadion, Eindhoven; Attendance: 900; Referees: Stavridis (GRE), Vogel (HUN) |
| 21 January 2012; 20:30 | Report | Stamm 4 | Goals | Sukno 3 | Pieter van den Hoogenband Zwemstadion, Eindhoven; Attendance: 900; Referees: Stavridis (GRE), Vogel (HUN) |

| 23 January 2012; 13:00 | Report | Croatia | 11–10 | Spain | Pieter van den Hoogenband Zwemstadion, Eindhoven; Attendance: 450; Referees: Fekete (HUN), Taylan (TUR) |
| 23 January 2012; 13:00 | Report | Score by quarters: 1–3, 5–1, 3–1, 2–5 | | | Pieter van den Hoogenband Zwemstadion, Eindhoven; Attendance: 450; Referees: Fekete (HUN), Taylan (TUR) |
| 23 January 2012; 13:00 | Report | five players 2 | Goals | Molina, Pérez 3 | Pieter van den Hoogenband Zwemstadion, Eindhoven; Attendance: 450; Referees: Fekete (HUN), Taylan (TUR) |

| 23 January 2012; 16:00 | Report | Serbia | 7–11 | Montenegro | Pieter van den Hoogenband Zwemstadion, Eindhoven; Attendance: 750; Referees: Stavridis (GRE), Levin (ISR) |
| 23 January 2012; 16:00 | Report | Score by quarters: 2–3, 1–3, 4–3, 0–2 | | | Pieter van den Hoogenband Zwemstadion, Eindhoven; Attendance: 750; Referees: Stavridis (GRE), Levin (ISR) |
| 23 January 2012; 16:00 | Report | Gocić, Pijetlović 2 | Goals | Janović, Ivović 3 | Pieter van den Hoogenband Zwemstadion, Eindhoven; Attendance: 750; Referees: Stavridis (GRE), Levin (ISR) |

| 23 January 2012; 17:30 | Report | Romania | 9–10 | Germany | Pieter van den Hoogenband Zwemstadion, Eindhoven; Attendance: 800; Referees: Gomez (ITA), Bervoets (NED) |
| 23 January 2012; 17:30 | Report | Score by quarters: 2–4, 3–2, 2–2, 2–2 | | | Pieter van den Hoogenband Zwemstadion, Eindhoven; Attendance: 800; Referees: Gomez (ITA), Bervoets (NED) |
| 23 January 2012; 17:30 | Report | Diaconu 3 | Goals | three players 2 | Pieter van den Hoogenband Zwemstadion, Eindhoven; Attendance: 800; Referees: Gomez (ITA), Bervoets (NED) |

== 7th–12th Classification ==
Bracket

7th–12th
B5 | Spain | 16
A6 | Turkey | 4
A5 | North Macedonia | 10
B6 | Romania | 12

7th–10th
A4 | Netherlands | 9
B5 | Spain | 14
B4 | Croatia | 12 (3)
B6 | Romania | 12 (4)
11th–12th
A6 | Turkey | 7
A5 | North Macedonia | 9

7th–8th
B5 | Spain | 9
B6 | Romania | 8
9th–10th
A4 | Netherlands | 4
B4 | Croatia | 16

=== 7th–12th places ===
| 25 January 2012; 14:00 | Report | North Macedonia | 10–12 | Romania | Pieter van den Hoogenband Zwemstadion, Eindhoven; Attendance: 200; Referees: Spiegel (GER), Vogel (HUN) |
| 25 January 2012; 14:00 | Report | Score by quarters: 1–1, 3–4, 3–4, 3–3 | | | Pieter van den Hoogenband Zwemstadion, Eindhoven; Attendance: 200; Referees: Spiegel (GER), Vogel (HUN) |
| 25 January 2012; 14:00 | Report | Ranđić 3 | Goals | Diaconu, Kádár 3 | Pieter van den Hoogenband Zwemstadion, Eindhoven; Attendance: 200; Referees: Spiegel (GER), Vogel (HUN) |

| 25 January 2012; 16:00 | Report | Turkey | 4–16 | Spain | Pieter van den Hoogenband Zwemstadion, Eindhoven; Attendance: 500; Referees: Bervoets (NED), Bianchi (ITA) |
| 25 January 2012; 16:00 | Report | Score by quarters: 0–5, 3–4, 0–3, 1–4 | | | Pieter van den Hoogenband Zwemstadion, Eindhoven; Attendance: 500; Referees: Bervoets (NED), Bianchi (ITA) |
| 25 January 2012; 16:00 | Report | four players 1 | Goals | Perrone 4 | Pieter van den Hoogenband Zwemstadion, Eindhoven; Attendance: 500; Referees: Bervoets (NED), Bianchi (ITA) |

=== 7th–10th places ===
| 27 January 2012; 14:00 | Report | Romania | 12 (4)–12 (3) (OT) | Croatia | Pieter van den Hoogenband Zwemstadion, Eindhoven; Attendance: 500; Referees: Bervoets (NED), Stajković (MKD) |
| 27 January 2012; 14:00 | Report | Score by quarters: 4–2, 3–2, 2–1, 1–5 OT: 2–2, 4–3 (PS) | | | Pieter van den Hoogenband Zwemstadion, Eindhoven; Attendance: 500; Referees: Bervoets (NED), Stajković (MKD) |
| 27 January 2012; 14:00 | Report | Radu 4 | Goals | Sukno 6 | Pieter van den Hoogenband Zwemstadion, Eindhoven; Attendance: 500; Referees: Bervoets (NED), Stajković (MKD) |

| 27 January 2012; 16:00 | Report | Spain | 14–9 | Netherlands | Pieter van den Hoogenband Zwemstadion, Eindhoven; Attendance: 1,500; Referees: Bianchi (ITA), Vasileiou (GRE) |
| 27 January 2012; 16:00 | Report | Score by quarters: 6–3, 4–0, 2–4, 2–2 | | | Pieter van den Hoogenband Zwemstadion, Eindhoven; Attendance: 1,500; Referees: Bianchi (ITA), Vasileiou (GRE) |
| 27 January 2012; 16:00 | Report | García 5 | Goals | Gottemaker 4 | Pieter van den Hoogenband Zwemstadion, Eindhoven; Attendance: 1,500; Referees: Bianchi (ITA), Vasileiou (GRE) |

=== 11th place ===
| 27 January 2012; 12:00 | Report | North Macedonia | 9–7 | Turkey | Pieter van den Hoogenband Zwemstadion, Eindhoven; Attendance: 200; Referees: Dutilh (NED), Sadekov (RUS) |
| 27 January 2012; 12:00 | Report | Score by quarters: 3–1, 2–2, 2–1, 2–3 | | | Pieter van den Hoogenband Zwemstadion, Eindhoven; Attendance: 200; Referees: Dutilh (NED), Sadekov (RUS) |
| 27 January 2012; 12:00 | Report | Three players 2 | Goals | Hantal, Okman 3 | Pieter van den Hoogenband Zwemstadion, Eindhoven; Attendance: 200; Referees: Dutilh (NED), Sadekov (RUS) |

=== 9th place ===
| 28 January 2012; 09:00 | Report | Croatia | 16–4 | Netherlands | Pieter van den Hoogenband Zwemstadion, Eindhoven; Attendance: 1,200; Referees: Taylan (TUR), Vogel (HUN) |
| 28 January 2012; 09:00 | Report | Score by quarters: 2–1, 5–1, 4–2, 5–0 | | | Pieter van den Hoogenband Zwemstadion, Eindhoven; Attendance: 1,200; Referees: Taylan (TUR), Vogel (HUN) |
| 28 January 2012; 09:00 | Report | Sukno 5 | Goals | Gerritse 2 | Pieter van den Hoogenband Zwemstadion, Eindhoven; Attendance: 1,200; Referees: Taylan (TUR), Vogel (HUN) |

=== 7th place ===
| 28 January 2012; 10:30 | Report | Romania | 8–9 | Spain | Pieter van den Hoogenband Zwemstadion, Eindhoven; Attendance: 900; Referees: Spiegel (GER), Vasileiou (GRE) |
| 28 January 2012; 10:30 | Report | Score by quarters: 1–2, 1–2, 3–1, 3–4 | | | Pieter van den Hoogenband Zwemstadion, Eindhoven; Attendance: 900; Referees: Spiegel (GER), Vasileiou (GRE) |
| 28 January 2012; 10:30 | Report | Radu 3 | Goals | Minguell 6 | Pieter van den Hoogenband Zwemstadion, Eindhoven; Attendance: 900; Referees: Spiegel (GER), Vasileiou (GRE) |

== Final round ==
Bracket

Quarterfinals
B2 | Montenegro | 11
A3 | Greece | 9
A2 | Italy | 9
B3 | Germany | 4

Semifinals
A1 | Hungary | 13
B2 | Montenegro | 14
B1 | Serbia | 12
A2 | Italy | 8
5th–6th
A3 | Greece | 6
B3 | Germany | 9

Gold medal game
B2 | Montenegro | 8
B1 | Serbia | 9
Bronze medal game
A1 | Hungary | 12
A2 | Italy | 9

=== Quarterfinals ===
| 25 January 2012; 18:00 | Report | Italy | 9–4 | Germany | Pieter van den Hoogenband Zwemstadion, Eindhoven; Attendance: 1,000; Referees: Levin (ISR), Stavridis (GRE) |
| 25 January 2012; 18:00 | Report | Score by quarters: 2–1, 3–2, 3–1, 1–0 | | | Pieter van den Hoogenband Zwemstadion, Eindhoven; Attendance: 1,000; Referees: Levin (ISR), Stavridis (GRE) |
| 25 January 2012; 18:00 | Report | Presciutti 3 | Goals | Oeler 3 | Pieter van den Hoogenband Zwemstadion, Eindhoven; Attendance: 1,000; Referees: Levin (ISR), Stavridis (GRE) |

| 25 January 2012; 20:00 | Report | Greece | 9–11 | Montenegro | Pieter van den Hoogenband Zwemstadion, Eindhoven; Attendance: 750; Referees: Koryzna (POL), Teixidó (ESP) |
| 25 January 2012; 20:00 | Report | Score by quarters: 4–2, 2–4, 2–4, 1–1 | | | Pieter van den Hoogenband Zwemstadion, Eindhoven; Attendance: 750; Referees: Koryzna (POL), Teixidó (ESP) |
| 25 January 2012; 20:00 | Report | Miralis, Ntoskas 2 | Goals | Janović, Gojković 3 | Pieter van den Hoogenband Zwemstadion, Eindhoven; Attendance: 750; Referees: Koryzna (POL), Teixidó (ESP) |

=== Semifinals ===
| 27 January 2012; 18:00 | Report | Italy | 8–12 | Serbia | Pieter van den Hoogenband Zwemstadion, Eindhoven; Attendance: 1,800; Referees: Levin (ISR), Teixidó (ESP) |
| 27 January 2012; 18:00 | Report | Score by quarters: 5–4, 1–4, 1–3, 1–1 | | | Pieter van den Hoogenband Zwemstadion, Eindhoven; Attendance: 1,800; Referees: Levin (ISR), Teixidó (ESP) |
| 27 January 2012; 18:00 | Report | Gallo 3 | Goals | Filipović 3 | Pieter van den Hoogenband Zwemstadion, Eindhoven; Attendance: 1,800; Referees: Levin (ISR), Teixidó (ESP) |

| 27 January 2012; 20:00 | Report | Montenegro | 14–13 (OT) | Hungary | Pieter van den Hoogenband Zwemstadion, Eindhoven; Attendance: 1,900; Referees: Spiegel (GER), Koganov (AZE) |
| 27 January 2012; 20:00 | Report | Score by quarters: 2–2, 4–3, 4–3, 2–4 OT: 2–1 | | | Pieter van den Hoogenband Zwemstadion, Eindhoven; Attendance: 1,900; Referees: Spiegel (GER), Koganov (AZE) |
| 27 January 2012; 20:00 | Report | Janović 5 | Goals | Kiss 4 | Pieter van den Hoogenband Zwemstadion, Eindhoven; Attendance: 1,900; Referees: Spiegel (GER), Koganov (AZE) |

=== 5th place ===
| 28 January 2012; 12:00 | Report | Germany | 9–6 | Greece | Pieter van den Hoogenband Zwemstadion, Eindhoven; Attendance: 1,200; Referees: Alexandrescu (ROU), Fekete (HUN) |
| 28 January 2012; 12:00 | Report | Score by quarters: 1–2, 2–1, 3–2, 3–1 | | | Pieter van den Hoogenband Zwemstadion, Eindhoven; Attendance: 1,200; Referees: Alexandrescu (ROU), Fekete (HUN) |
| 28 January 2012; 12:00 | Report | Roeßing 3 | Goals | 6 players 1 | Pieter van den Hoogenband Zwemstadion, Eindhoven; Attendance: 1,200; Referees: Alexandrescu (ROU), Fekete (HUN) |

=== 3rd place ===
| 29 January 2012; 13:30 | Report | Italy | 9–12 | Hungary | Pieter van den Hoogenband Zwemstadion, Eindhoven; Attendance: 2000; Referees: Periš (CRO), Alexandrescu (ROU) |
| 29 January 2012; 13:30 | Report | Score by quarters: 1–1, 3–4, 4–1, 1–6 | | | Pieter van den Hoogenband Zwemstadion, Eindhoven; Attendance: 2000; Referees: Periš (CRO), Alexandrescu (ROU) |
| 29 January 2012; 13:30 | Report | Giorgetti, Gallo, Presciutti 2 | Goals | Biros 6 | Pieter van den Hoogenband Zwemstadion, Eindhoven; Attendance: 2000; Referees: Periš (CRO), Alexandrescu (ROU) |

=== Final ===
| 29 January 2012; 15:30 | Report | Serbia | 9–8 | Montenegro | Pieter van den Hoogenband Zwemstadion, Eindhoven; Attendance: 2300; Referees: Gomez (ITA), Stavridis (GRE) |
| 29 January 2012; 15:30 | Report | Score by quarters: 1–1, 2–3, 3–1, 3–3 | | | Pieter van den Hoogenband Zwemstadion, Eindhoven; Attendance: 2300; Referees: Gomez (ITA), Stavridis (GRE) |
| 29 January 2012; 15:30 | Report | Mitrović, Udovičić 2 | Goals | Radović 3 | Pieter van den Hoogenband Zwemstadion, Eindhoven; Attendance: 2300; Referees: Gomez (ITA), Stavridis (GRE) |

== Final ranking ==
| RANK | TEAM |
|---|---|
| | Serbia |
| | Montenegro |
| | Hungary |
| 4. | Italy |
| 5. | Germany |
| 6. | Greece |
| 7. | Spain |
| 8. | Romania |
| 9. | Croatia |
| 10. | Netherlands |
| 11. | North Macedonia |
| 12. | Turkey |

2012 Men's European champion

Serbia
Fifth title

Team roster
Slobodan Soro, Aleksa Šaponjić, Živko Gocić, Vanja Udovičić, Miloš Ćuk, Duško Pijetlović, Slobodan Nikić, Milan Aleksić, Nikola Rađen, Filip Filipović, Andrija Prlainović, Stefan Mitrović, and Branislav Mitrović

Head coach: Dejan Udovičić

== Awards ==
| Top Scorer | Player of the Tournament |
|---|---|
| (Croatia) Sandro Sukno | (Montenegro) Mlađan Janović |
