= Slobodan Soro =

Serbian-born Brazilian water polo player

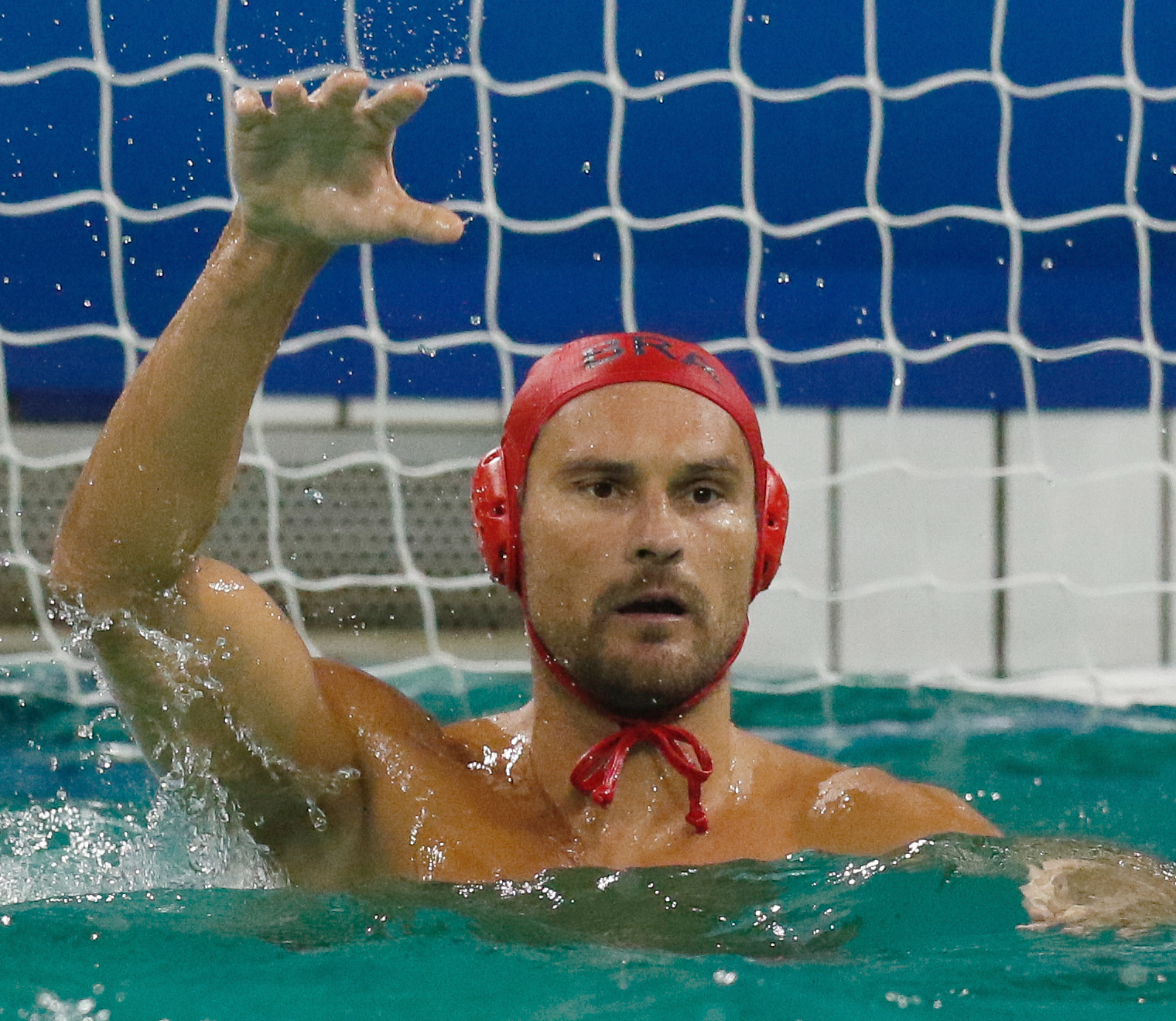
- Soro playing for Brazil at the 2016 Olympics

Personal information
- Born: 23 December 1978 (age 47) Novi Sad, SR Serbia, Yugoslavia
- Height: 1.98 m (6 ft 6 in)
- Weight: 100 kg (220 lb)

Sport
- Sport: Water polo
- Club: Natació Sabadell (2006–08) VK Partizan (2008–15) Botafogo
- Coached by: Ângelo Coelho
Medal record
Representing Serbia
Olympic Games
| Bronze medal – third place | 2008 Beijing | Team |
| Bronze medal – third place | 2012 London | Team |
World Championship
| Gold medal – first place | 2009 Rome | Team |
| Silver medal – second place | 2011 Shanghai | Team |
European Championship
| Gold medal – first place | 2006 Belgrade | Team |
| Gold medal – first place | 2012 Eindhoven | Team |
| Silver medal – second place | 2008 Málaga | Team |
| Bronze medal – third place | 2010 Zagreb | Team |
FINA World League
| Gold medal – first place | 2006 Athens | Team |
| Gold medal – first place | 2007 Berlin | Team |
| Gold medal – first place | 2008 Genova | Team |
| Gold medal – first place | 2010 Niš | Team |
| Gold medal – first place | 2011 Firenze | Team |
| Bronze medal – third place | 2009 Podgorica | Team |
World Cup
| Gold medal – first place | 2010 Oradea | Team |
Mediterranean Games
| Gold medal – first place | 2009 Pescara | Team |
Representing Brazil
Pan American Games
| Bronze medal – third place | 2019 Lima | Team |

Slobodan Soro (Serbian Cyrillic: Слободан Соро; born 23 December 1978) is a Serbian-born Brazilian water polo goalkeeper.

As a member of the Serbia men's national water polo team at the 2008 Beijing Olympics and the 2012 London Olympics, he won the bronze medal in both of those Olympics. With Serbia he won the 2012 Men's European Water Polo Championship. It was his second gold medal in the competition. In 2011 he won the National Championship and National Cup of Serbia, LEN Euroleague, LEN Supercup and Eurointer League with Partizan Raiffeisen.

In 2015 he became a Brazilian naturalized citizen and was a member of the Brazil national team that competed at the 2016 Rio Olympics. He was the top goalkeeper at the 2016 Olympics, with 81 saves.

== Club career ==
Slobodan Soro played for numerus clubs, including VK Vojvodina, VK Beograd, VK Bečej, VK Dinamo, PVK Jadran, VK Partizan, Rari Nantes Savona, CN Sabadell, CR Flamengo, Shturm 2002, Botafogo and now S.S. Lazio.

=== VK Partizan ===
In July 2010, the goalkeeper of VK Partizan and Serbian national team, signed a new two-year contract with Serbian champions. Partizan had financial problems, so that at one time Soro's stay at the club was questioned, but in the end it was all denied by him signing a new contract.

== National career ==
=== 2012 Samartzidis Cup ===
From 9 to 11 January 2012. Soro competed with his national team on the Greek island of Chios in the Samaridis Cup which was more a like preparation tournament for the upcoming 2012 European Championship held in Eindhoven. He and his team-mates finished second behind the Montenegrins on goal difference. However, Soro was named as the best goalkeeper of the tournament.

=== 2012 Eindhoven ===
On 16 January, at the European Championship Soro had a brilliant game making 14 saves in the first game in an 8–5 win against Spain. On 29 January, Soro won the European Championship with his national team beating in the final Montenegro by 9–8. Unlike in the semifinal game against Italy were Soro was substituted by Branislav Mitrović because of the poor play, he absolutely dominated on the goal of Serbia in the final match. This was his second gold and overall fourth European medal.

== Honours ==
=== Club ===
VK Bečej

- National Championship of Yugoslavia (1): 1999–2000
- National Cup of Yugoslavia (1): 1999–2000
- LEN Euroleague (1): 1999–2000

VK Partizan

- National Championship of Serbia (3): 2008–09, 2009–10, 2010–11
- National Cup of Serbia (4): 2008–09, 2009–10, 2010–11, 2011–12
- LEN Euroleague (1): 2010–11
- LEN Supercup (1): 2011
- LEN Cup (1): 1997–98
- Eurointer League (2): 2010, 2011

Botafogo

- National Championship of Brazil (1): 2015
- Rio de Janeiro State Championship (1): 2016
- South America Championship (1): 2017

=== Individual ===
- FINA World Cup Best Goalkeeper (1): 2010 Oreada
- FINA World League Best Goalkeeper (1): 2011 Firenze
- Samaridis Cup Best Goalkeeper (1): 2012 Chios
- Serbia's sport association "May Award" : 2012

== See also ==
- Serbia men's Olympic water polo team records and statistics
- Brazil men's Olympic water polo team records and statistics
- List of Olympic medalists in water polo (men)
- List of men's Olympic water polo tournament goalkeepers
- List of world champions in men's water polo
- List of World Aquatics Championships medalists in water polo
