= Marko Avramović (water polo) =

Serbian water polo player

Personal information
- Born: 24 August 1986 (age 39) Belgrade, SR Serbia, SFR Yugoslavia
Medal record
Men's water polo
Representing Serbia
World Championship
Gold medal – first place	2009 Rome
Silver medal – second place	2011 Shanghai
European Championship
Silver medal – second place	2008 Málaga
Bronze medal – third place	2010 Zagreb
FINA World League
Gold medal – first place	2007 Berlin
Gold medal – first place	2010 Niš
Gold medal – first place	2011 Firenze
Bronze medal – third place	2009 Podgorica
FINA World Cup
Gold medal – first place	2010 Oradea
Mediterranean Games
Gold medal – first place	2009 Pescara
Representing Serbia and Montenegro
Universiade
Gold medal – first place	2005 İzmir

Marko Avramović (Serbian Cyrillic: Марко Аврамовић; born 24 August 1986, in Belgrade, Serbia, SFR Yugoslavia) is a Serbian water polo player. He played for Crvena Zvezda. He is also a part of the Serbian National team.

== Club career ==
=== Partizan Raiffeisen ===
In May 2011. just as Partizan Raiffeisen finished the Euroleague quarterfinal stage competition, winning first place with the maximum number of points, problems have emerged. Member of Serbian national team, Marko Avramović decided to request the termination of the contract with the club so far. The reason was as he said, unprofessional and improper relationship between him and Partizan leaders. The problems started in a period when he missed the last three games in Euroleague against Budva, Jug and Jadran. Speaking for Sports Journal, Avramović said: "At a press conference before the away match with Budva was stated I will not play in that match because of my poor form, which was not true. The reason is, that I refused to revise my current contract, I did not want my wages to be reduced."

=== Crvena Zvezda ===
On 17 February Avramović scored his first goal of the Serbian National Championship, in the third round of the "A League", in a 7–4 win over VK Beograd.

=== Clubs he played for ===
- 2002–2011 Partizan Raiffeizen
- 2011–2015 Crvena Zvezda
- 2015–2017 Ferencvárosi TC
- 2017– Egri VK

== Honours ==
=== Club ===
VK Partizan

- National Championship of Serbia (5): 2006–07, 2007–08, 2008–09, 2009–10, 2010–11
- National Cup of Serbia (5): 2006–07, 2007–08, 2008–09, 2009–10, 2010–11
- Eurointer League (1): 2010

VK Crvena Zvezda

- National Championship of Serbia (1): 2012–13
- National Cup of Serbia (1): 2012–13

Ferencvárosi TC

- LEN Euro Cup (1): 2016-17

== See also ==
- List of world champions in men's water polo
- List of World Aquatics Championships medalists in water polo
