= Nikola Rađen =

Serbian water polo player

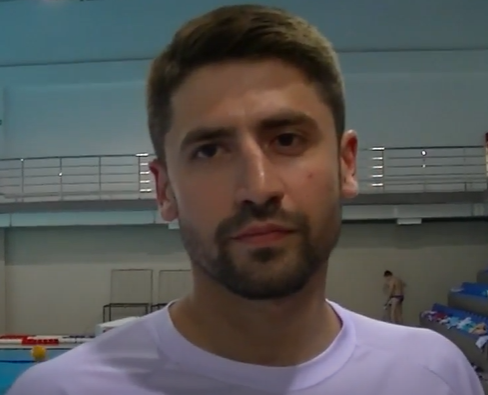
- Rađen in 2017

Personal information
- Nationality: Serbian
- Born: 29 January 1985 (age 41) Sombor, SR Serbia, SFR Yugoslavia
- Height: 195 cm (77 in)
- Weight: 121 kg (267 lb)

Sport
- Sport: Water polo
- Handedness: Right
- Position: Defender
- Current club: Crvena zvezda (men's water polo)

Senior clubs
- Years: Team
- 2000–2002: Vojvodina
- 2002–2011: Partizan Raiffeisen
- 2011–2012: NC Chios
- 2012–2014: Crvena zvezda
- 2014–2015: Olympiacos
- 2017: CSM Digi Oradea
- 2017–2019: WPC Dynamo Moscow
- 2019–2020: Crvena zvezda
- 2020–2021: AEK Athens
- 2021–2022: Crvena zvezda
National team
- Years: Team
- 2005–2006: Serbia and Montenegro
- 2006–2013: Serbia
Medal record
Olympic Games
Bronze medal – third place	2008 Beijing
Bronze medal – third place	2012 London
World Championship
Gold medal – first place	2009 Rome
Silver medal – second place	2011 Shanghai
European Championship
Gold medal – first place	2012 Eindhoven
Silver medal – second place	2008 Málaga
Bronze medal – third place	2010 Zagreb
FINA World League
Gold medal – first place	2008 Genova
Gold medal – first place	2010 Niš
Gold medal – first place	2011 Firenze
Gold medal – first place	2013 Chelyabinsk
Bronze medal – third place	2009 Podgorica
Mediterranean Games
Gold medal – first place	2009 Pescara
Bronze medal – third place	2005 Almeria
Universiade
Gold medal – first place	2005 İzmir

Nikola Rađen (Serbian Cyrillic: Никола Рађен, pronounced [nǐkola râdʑen]; born 29 January 1985) is a Serbian water polo player who plays for Serbian club Crvena zvezda. He was a member of the Serbia men's national water polo team at the 2008 Beijing Olympics. He won with Serbia the 2009 World Championship as well as the 2012 Eindhoven European Championship. Rađen has also won 2 LEN Euroleagues with his former clubs Partizan Raiffeisen (2011) and VK Crvena zvezda (2013).

== National career ==
=== 2012 Eindhoven ===
On 16 January, at the European Championship Rađen scored in the first game two goals in an 8–5 win against Spain. After next two games without goals, on 21 January in the fourth match, Rađen scored his third goal of the tournament for his national team in a routine victory against Romania 14–5. Nikola Rađen won the 2012 European Championship on 29 January. He scored a goal in the final against Montenegro which his national team won by 9–8. This was his first gold medal at the European Championships.

== Honours ==
=== Club ===
VK Partizan

- LEN Champions League (1): 2010–11
- National Championship of Serbia (5): 2006–07, 2007–08, 2008–09, 2009–10, 2010–11
- National Cup of Serbia (5): 2006–07, 2007–08, 2008–09, 2009–10, 2010–11
- Eurointer League (2): 2010, 2011

VK Crvena Zvezda

- LEN Champions League (1): 2012–13
- LEN Super Cup (1): 2013
- National Championship of Serbia (1): 2012–13
- National Cup of Serbia (1): 2012–13
- Eurointer League (1): 2013

Olympiacos

- National Championship of Greece (1): 2014–15
- National Cup of Greece (1): 2014–15

CSM Digi Oradea

- National Championship of Rumania (1) : 2016–17

Dynamo Moscow

- National Championship of Russia (2): 2017–18, 2018–19
- National Cup of Russia (2): 2017–18, 2018–19

== Failed drug test ==
On 15 May 2015, Serbian media published that Rađen was tested positive for cocaine after the World League game between Serbia and Spain, held on 17 February 2015. The penalty for such doping violation is 4 years of not participating in any kind of sport events. On 18 May 2015, he was officially temporary suspended by FINA due to continued investigation into his positive doping results to cocaine metabolites. Furthermore, two days later, Olympiacos, the club with whom he was under the contract, terminated the contract for violating the terms of it. On 24 August 2015, he was officially suspended on a 4-year period by FINA for positive doping results; from tests taking place on 17 February, and nearly two months later, on 15 April.

== Personal life ==
He joined the Serbian Progressive Party in November 2023.

== See also ==
- List of Olympic medalists in water polo (men)
- List of world champions in men's water polo
- List of World Aquatics Championships medalists in water polo
