= Water polo at the 2009 World Aquatics Championships – Men's tournament =

Tournament details
- Venue: Italy (in Rome host cities)
- Dates: 22 July – 3 August
- Teams: 16 (from 5 confederations)

Final positions
- Champions: Serbia (1st title)
- Runners-up: Spain
- Third place: Croatia
- Fourth place: United States

Tournament statistics
- Matches played: 48
- Goals scored: 801 (16.69 per match)
- Attendance: 64,850 (1,351 per match)
- Top scorers: (Serbia) Filip Filipović (20 goals (2 pen.))

Awards
- Best player: (Serbia) Vanja Udovičić

The men's water polo tournament at the 2009 World Aquatics Championships, organised by the FINA, was held in Rome, Italy from 20 July to 1 August 2009. All matches were held in a temporary pool at the tennis stadium of the Foro Italico sports complex.

The men's tournament was won by Serbia.

== Teams ==
Africa	Americas	Asia	Europe	Oceania
South Africa	Brazil; Canada; United States	China; Kazakhstan	Croatia; Germany; Hungary; Italy; North Macedonia; Montenegro; Romania; Serbia; Spain	Australia

=== Groups formed ===
Group A

- Canada
- Germany
- Hungary
- South Africa

Group B

- Brazil
- China
- Croatia
- Montenegro

Group C

- Australia
- Kazakhstan
- Serbia
- Spain

Group D

- Italy
- North Macedonia
- Romania
- United States

== Preliminary round ==
All times are Central European Summer Time (UTC+2)

Qualified for the quarterfinals
Qualified for the eightfinals
Will play for places 13–16

=== Tie-breaking criteria ===
If two teams shall have equal points, further classification shall be established as follows:

1. The team winning the game between them shall be placed higher.
2. If the game between them was tied, then the results against the highest placed team(s) in the group shall be considered.
3. The first comparison shall be based on goal difference, and if still tied, then based on goals scored.
4. The comparison shall be made first compared to the highest placed team (or teams, if tied) in the group.
5. If still tied, the results against the next highest placed team (or teams, if tied) shall be used in succession until all results have been considered.
6. If still tied, the teams shall shoot penalty shots to determine which team shall be placed higher. Each team shall nominate five players and a goalkeeper who will participate in the penalty shoot out. The team shall shoot five penalty shots at the goal of the other team, alternating shots. If a tie exists after each team has taken five shots, then teams shall take sets of alternate shots until one team scores and the other does not. The procedure shall be conducted following the final game of the round or at the first practical opportunity.

If there is more than one tie in a group, the highest placed tie shall be determined first.

If three or more teams shall have equal points, further classification shall be established as follows:

1. The results among the tied teams shall determine which team is placed highest.
2. If, at any time during the application of the procedure set out in this paragraph, the highest placed team is determined and the number of tied teams is reduced to two, then the above paragraph shall be used to determine which of the two remaining teams is placed higher.
3. The comparison shall be made first, upon the points of the games among the tied teams, second, the goal difference, and third, based upon goals scored.
4. If still tied, the games played against the highest placed team (or teams, if tied) shall be considered.
5. The first comparison shall be based on goal difference, and if still tied, then based on goals scored.
6. If still tied, the results against the next highest placed team (or teams, if tied) shall be used in succession until all results have been considered.
7. If still tied, the teams shall shoot penalty shots to determine which team shall be placed highest. Each team shall nominate five players and a goalkeeper who will participate in the penalty shoot out. Each team shall shoot five penalty shots at its opponent's goal in alternate succession. The first team shall take its first penalty shot and then each other team shall take its first penalty shot, etc. If a tie shall exist after that procedure, the teams shall then take sets of alternate shots until one team misses and the other(s) score. The procedure shall be conducted following the final game of the round or at the first practical opportunity.

If there is more than one tie in a group, the highest placed tie shall be determined first.

Source: "CODE OF CONDUCT – BL 9.6.3 Tie Breaking". FINA.

=== Group A ===
Team	Pld	W	D	L	GF	GA	GD	Pts
Hungary	3	2	1	0	37	18	+19	5
Canada	3	2	0	1	23	20	+3	4
Germany	3	1	1	1	25	16	+9	3
South Africa	3	0	0	3	10	41	-31	0

20 July 2009; 09:30	Match 1	South Africa	4–14	Germany	Attendance: 400; Referees: Peris (CRO), Knights (NZL)
20 July 2009; 09:30	Match 1	Score by quarters: 1-4, 0-4, 2-3, 1-3			Attendance: 400; Referees: Peris (CRO), Knights (NZL)
20 July 2009; 09:30	Match 1	four players 1	Goals	Oeler 5	Attendance: 400; Referees: Peris (CRO), Knights (NZL)

20 July 2009; 10:50	Match 2	Canada	6–15	Hungary	Attendance: 550; Referees: Patelli (BRA), Mernenko (UZB)
20 July 2009; 10:50	Match 2	Score by quarters: 1-4, 1-4, 3-5, 1-2			Attendance: 550; Referees: Patelli (BRA), Mernenko (UZB)
20 July 2009; 10:50	Match 2	Graham 4	Goals	Biros 3	Attendance: 550; Referees: Patelli (BRA), Mernenko (UZB)

22 July 2009; 18:20	Match 14	Hungary	7–7	Germany	Attendance: 1,300; Referees: Peris (CRO), Borrell (ESP)
22 July 2009; 18:20	Match 14	Score by quarters: 2-3, 1-0, 2-1, 2-3			Attendance: 1,300; Referees: Peris (CRO), Borrell (ESP)
22 July 2009; 18:20	Match 14	Hosnyánszky 3	Goals	Savić, Politze 2	Attendance: 1,300; Referees: Peris (CRO), Borrell (ESP)

22 July 2009; 19:40	Match 15	South Africa	1–12	Canada	Attendance: 1,900; Referees: Koganov (AZE), Reemnet (NED)
22 July 2009; 19:40	Match 15	Score by quarters: 1-2, 0-4, 0-1, 0-5			Attendance: 1,900; Referees: Koganov (AZE), Reemnet (NED)
22 July 2009; 19:40	Match 15	Bell 1	Goals	Marks, Feltham 3	Attendance: 1,900; Referees: Koganov (AZE), Reemnet (NED)

24 July 2009; 13:30	Match 20	South Africa	5–15	Hungary	Attendance: 200; Referees: Sadekov (RUS), Wengenroth (SUI)
24 July 2009; 13:30	Match 20	Score by quarters: 1-6, 1-3, 1-4, 2-2			Attendance: 200; Referees: Sadekov (RUS), Wengenroth (SUI)
24 July 2009; 13:30	Match 20	five players 1	Goals	Varga 4	Attendance: 200; Referees: Sadekov (RUS), Wengenroth (SUI)

24 July 2009; 17:00	Match 21	Canada	5–4	Germany	Attendance: 600; Referees: Brguljan (MNE), Balfanbayev (KAZ)
24 July 2009; 17:00	Match 21	Score by quarters: 1-1, 1-0, 1-0, 2-3			Attendance: 600; Referees: Brguljan (MNE), Balfanbayev (KAZ)
24 July 2009; 17:00	Match 21	Graham, Feltham 2	Goals	Oeler 2	Attendance: 600; Referees: Brguljan (MNE), Balfanbayev (KAZ)

=== Group B ===
Team	Pld	W	D	L	GF	GA	GD	Pts
Croatia	3	3	0	0	37	12	+25	6
Montenegro	3	2	0	1	38	20	+18	4
China	3	1	0	2	18	34	-16	2
Brazil	3	0	0	3	12	39	-27	0

20 July 2009; 12:10	Match 3	Montenegro	14–4	China	Attendance: 250; Referees: Kiszelly (HUN), Moner (EGY)
20 July 2009; 12:10	Match 3	Score by quarters: 4-1, 3-2, 3-1, 4-0			Attendance: 250; Referees: Kiszelly (HUN), Moner (EGY)
20 July 2009; 12:10	Match 3	Zloković 4	Goals	Tan 2	Attendance: 250; Referees: Kiszelly (HUN), Moner (EGY)

20 July 2009; 13:30	Match 4	Croatia	11–2	Brazil	Attendance: 200; Referees: Koganov (AZE), Ghafouri (IRI)
20 July 2009; 13:30	Match 4	Score by quarters: 1-0, 3-0, 3-1, 4-1			Attendance: 200; Referees: Koganov (AZE), Ghafouri (IRI)
20 July 2009; 13:30	Match 4	Dobud, Sukno, Barač 2	Goals	Silva, Franco 1	Attendance: 200; Referees: Koganov (AZE), Ghafouri (IRI)

22 July 2009; 09:30	Match 9	Brazil	5–9	China	Attendance: 200; Referees: Rotsart (USA), Pinker (RSA)
22 July 2009; 09:30	Match 9	Score by quarters: 0-1, 3-2, 0-3, 2-3			Attendance: 200; Referees: Rotsart (USA), Pinker (RSA)
22 July 2009; 09:30	Match 9	five players 1	Goals	Liang, Wang B 3	Attendance: 200; Referees: Rotsart (USA), Pinker (RSA)

22 July 2009; 10:50	Match 10	Montenegro	5–11	Croatia	Attendance: 200; Referees: Turcotte (CAN), Tulga (TUR)
22 July 2009; 10:50	Match 10	Score by quarters: 2-4, 2-2, 0-5, 1-0			Attendance: 200; Referees: Turcotte (CAN), Tulga (TUR)
22 July 2009; 10:50	Match 10	five players 1	Goals	Sukno 3	Attendance: 200; Referees: Turcotte (CAN), Tulga (TUR)

24 July 2009; 18:20	Match 22	Montenegro	19–5	Brazil	Attendance: 1,200; Referees: Rotsart (USA), Damcevski (MKD)
24 July 2009; 18:20	Match 22	Score by quarters: 4-1, 6-0, 6-3, 3-1			Attendance: 1,200; Referees: Rotsart (USA), Damcevski (MKD)
24 July 2009; 18:20	Match 22	M. Janovic, N. Janović 4	Goals	Franco 2	Attendance: 1,200; Referees: Rotsart (USA), Damcevski (MKD)

24 July 2009; 19:40	Match 23	Croatia	15–5	China	Attendance: 2,000; Referees: Reemnet (NED), Mernenko (UZB)
24 July 2009; 19:40	Match 23	Score by quarters: 3-2, 4-1, 5-0, 3-2			Attendance: 2,000; Referees: Reemnet (NED), Mernenko (UZB)
24 July 2009; 19:40	Match 23	Bošković 5	Goals	five players 1	Attendance: 2,000; Referees: Reemnet (NED), Mernenko (UZB)

=== Group C ===
Team	Pld	W	D	L	GF	GA	GD	Pts
Spain	3	3	0	0	35	24	+11	6
Serbia	3	1	1	1	37	22	+15	3
Australia	3	1	1	1	32	28	+4	3
Kazakhstan	3	0	0	3	15	45	-30	0

20 July 2009; 17:00	Match 5	Kazakhstan	7–14	Australia	Attendance: 650; Referees: Stavropoulos (GRE), Matache (ROU)
20 July 2009; 17:00	Match 5	Score by quarters: 1-4, 2-4, 1-3, 3-3			Attendance: 650; Referees: Stavropoulos (GRE), Matache (ROU)
20 July 2009; 17:00	Match 5	Gorovoy, Andreyev, Kukumanov 2	Goals	Whalan 4	Attendance: 650; Referees: Stavropoulos (GRE), Matache (ROU)

20 July 2009; 18:20	Match 6	Serbia	9–11	Spain	Attendance: 2,000; Referees: Tulga (TUR), Turcotte (CAN)
20 July 2009; 18:20	Match 6	Score by quarters: 1-3, 2-1, 3-2, 3-5			Attendance: 2,000; Referees: Tulga (TUR), Turcotte (CAN)
20 July 2009; 18:20	Match 6	Udovičić, Mitrović 2	Goals	X García 3	Attendance: 2,000; Referees: Tulga (TUR), Turcotte (CAN)

22 July 2009; 12:10	Match 11	Spain	13–10	Australia	Attendance: 500; Referees: Margeta (SLO), Gomez (ITA)
22 July 2009; 12:10	Match 11	Score by quarters: 3-2, 3-2, 5-2, 2-4			Attendance: 500; Referees: Margeta (SLO), Gomez (ITA)
22 July 2009; 12:10	Match 11	Mallarach, Perrone 3	Goals	Whalan 3	Attendance: 500; Referees: Margeta (SLO), Gomez (ITA)

22 July 2009; 13:30	Match 12	Kazakhstan	3–20	Serbia	Attendance: 150; Referees: Spiegel (GER), Stavropoulos (GRE)
22 July 2009; 13:30	Match 12	Score by quarters: 1-4, 1-7, 1-3, 0-6			Attendance: 150; Referees: Spiegel (GER), Stavropoulos (GRE)
22 July 2009; 13:30	Match 12	Manafov 3	Goals	Pijetlović, Filipović 5	Attendance: 150; Referees: Spiegel (GER), Stavropoulos (GRE)

24 July 2009; 09:30	Match 17	Kazakhstan	5–11	Spain	Attendance: 300; Referees: Koganov (AZE), Shiwei (CHN)
24 July 2009; 09:30	Match 17	Score by quarters: 1-4, 0-2, 1-2, 3-3			Attendance: 300; Referees: Koganov (AZE), Shiwei (CHN)
24 July 2009; 09:30	Match 17	Andreyev 2	Goals	Molina, Vallès, X García 2	Attendance: 300; Referees: Koganov (AZE), Shiwei (CHN)

24 July 2009; 10:50	Match 18	Serbia	8–8	Australia	Attendance: 500; Referees: Turcotte (CAN), Gomez (ITA)
24 July 2009; 10:50	Match 18	Score by quarters: 2-1, 1-2, 3-4, 2-1			Attendance: 500; Referees: Turcotte (CAN), Gomez (ITA)
24 July 2009; 10:50	Match 18	Filipović 3	Goals	Cotterill, Whalan 3	Attendance: 500; Referees: Turcotte (CAN), Gomez (ITA)

=== Group D ===
Team	Pld	W	D	L	GF	GA	GD	Pts
United States	3	3	0	0	29	19	+10	6
Romania	3	2	0	1	17	16	+1	4
Italy	3	1	0	2	25	20	+5	2
North Macedonia	3	0	0	3	15	31	-16	0

20 July 2009; 19:40	Match 7	North Macedonia	4–6	Romania	Attendance: 2,000; Referees: Brguljan (MNE), Margeta (SLO)
20 July 2009; 19:40	Match 7	Score by quarters: 1-1, 2-2, 0-3, 1-0			Attendance: 2,000; Referees: Brguljan (MNE), Margeta (SLO)
20 July 2009; 19:40	Match 7	Bašić 2	Goals	Radu 2	Attendance: 2,000; Referees: Brguljan (MNE), Margeta (SLO)

20 July 2009; 21:00	Match 8	United States	9–8	Italy	Attendance: 5,400; Referees: Borrell (ESP), Balfanbayev (KAZ)
20 July 2009; 21:00	Match 8	Score by quarters: 3-2, 2-1, 1-2, 3-3			Attendance: 5,400; Referees: Borrell (ESP), Balfanbayev (KAZ)
20 July 2009; 21:00	Match 8	Azevedo 4	Goals	Calcaterra 3	Attendance: 5,400; Referees: Borrell (ESP), Balfanbayev (KAZ)

22 July 2009; 17:00	Match 13	United States	13–6	North Macedonia	Attendance: 1,200; Referees: Balfanbayev (KAZ), Knights (NZL)
22 July 2009; 17:00	Match 13	Score by quarters: 3-0, 5-2, 3-2, 2-2			Attendance: 1,200; Referees: Balfanbayev (KAZ), Knights (NZL)
22 July 2009; 17:00	Match 13	Azevedo 4	Goals	Milić 2	Attendance: 1,200; Referees: Balfanbayev (KAZ), Knights (NZL)

22 July 2009; 21:00	Match 16	Romania	6–5	Italy	Attendance: 5,300; Referees: Ciric (SRB), Brguljan (MNE)
22 July 2009; 21:00	Match 16	Score by quarters: 1-2, 2-1, 1-2, 2-0			Attendance: 5,300; Referees: Ciric (SRB), Brguljan (MNE)
22 July 2009; 21:00	Match 16	Diaconu 2	Goals	five players 1	Attendance: 5,300; Referees: Ciric (SRB), Brguljan (MNE)

24 July 2009; 12:10	Match 19	United States	7–5	Romania	Attendance: 500; Referees: Kiszelly (HUN), Stavropoulos (GRE)
24 July 2009; 12:10	Match 19	Score by quarters: 1-2, 2-0, 2-2, 2-1			Attendance: 500; Referees: Kiszelly (HUN), Stavropoulos (GRE)
24 July 2009; 12:10	Match 19	Beaubien 3	Goals	Matei Guiman 2	Attendance: 500; Referees: Kiszelly (HUN), Stavropoulos (GRE)

24 July 2009; 21:00	Match 24	North Macedonia	5–12	Italy	Attendance: 5,400; Referees: Peris (CRO), Tulga (TUR)
24 July 2009; 21:00	Match 24	Score by quarters: 2-3, 0-3, 3-3, 0-3			Attendance: 5,400; Referees: Peris (CRO), Tulga (TUR)
24 July 2009; 21:00	Match 24	Milic 3	Goals	Gallo, Fiorentini 3	Attendance: 5,400; Referees: Peris (CRO), Tulga (TUR)

== Final round ==
=== Brackets ===
Play-off; 26 July 2009
Serbia	7
Italy	5
Australia	5
Romania	7
Canada	9
China	5
Germany	9
Montenegro	8

Quarterfinals; 28 July 2009
Hungary	9
Serbia	10
Croatia	7
Romania	5
Spain	11
Canada	4
United States	8
Germany	5

Semifinals; 30 July 2009
Serbia	12
Croatia	11
Spain	7
United States	6

Final; 1 August 2009
Serbia	14
Spain	13
Third place
Croatia	8
United States	6

5th–8th place

5th–8th place
30 July 2009 – 11:40
Hungary	13
Romania	8
30 July 2009 – 15:30
Canada	5
Germany	9

5th/6th place
1 August 2009 – 10:40
Hungary	9
Germany	6
7th/8th place
1 August 2009 – 09:00
Romania	9
Canada	6

9th–12th place

9th–12th place
28 July 2009 – 11:20
China	5
Montenegro	13
28 July 2009 – 12:40
Italy	6
Australia	8

9th/10th place
30 July 2009 – 10:20
Montenegro	8
Australia	7
11th/12th place
30 July 2009 – 09:00
China	7
Italy	14

13th–16th place

13th–16th place
26 July 2009 – 09:00
South Africa	7
Brazil	8
26 July 2009 – 10:20
Kazakhstan	4
North Macedonia	11

13th/14th place
28 July 2009 – 10:00
Brazil (PSO)	16
North Macedonia	15
15th/16th place
28 July 2009 – 08:40
South Africa	6
Kazakhstan	5

=== Semifinals 13–16 places ===
26 July 2009; 09:00	Match 25	South Africa	7–8	Brazil	Attendance: 150; Referees: Rotsart (USA), Balfanbayev (KAZ)
26 July 2009; 09:00	Match 25	Score by quarters: 3-3, 1-2, 2-2, 1-1			Attendance: 150; Referees: Rotsart (USA), Balfanbayev (KAZ)
26 July 2009; 09:00	Match 25	le Roux, Bell 2	Goals	Silva, Franco 2	Attendance: 150; Referees: Rotsart (USA), Balfanbayev (KAZ)

26 July 2009; 10:20	Match 26	Kazakhstan	4–11	North Macedonia	Attendance: 250; Referees: Spiegel (GER), Mernenko (UZB)
26 July 2009; 10:20	Match 26	Score by quarters: 1-3, 2-4, 0-1, 1-3			Attendance: 250; Referees: Spiegel (GER), Mernenko (UZB)
26 July 2009; 10:20	Match 26	Andreyev 2	Goals	Krstic 5	Attendance: 250; Referees: Spiegel (GER), Mernenko (UZB)

=== Eightfinals ===
26 July 2009; 11:40	Match 27	Canada	9–5	China	Attendance: 400; Referees: Ciric (SRB), Flahive (AUS)
26 July 2009; 11:40	Match 27	Score by quarters: 2-1, 2-0, 3-2, 2-2			Attendance: 400; Referees: Ciric (SRB), Flahive (AUS)
26 July 2009; 11:40	Match 27	Feltham 3	Goals	Yu, Wang B. 2	Attendance: 400; Referees: Ciric (SRB), Flahive (AUS)

26 July 2009; 15:30	Match 28	Germany	9–8 (OT)	Montenegro	Attendance: 1,200; Referees: Kiszelly (HUN), Gomez (ITA)
26 July 2009; 15:30	Match 28	Score by quarters: 3-3, 1-2, 2-2, 2-1 OT: 1-0			Attendance: 1,200; Referees: Kiszelly (HUN), Gomez (ITA)
26 July 2009; 15:30	Match 28	Savic 3	Goals	M. Janovic, Zloković 2	Attendance: 1,200; Referees: Kiszelly (HUN), Gomez (ITA)

26 July 2009; 16:50	Match 30	Australia	5–7	Romania	Attendance: 1,000; Referees: Borrell (ESP), Margeta (SLO)
26 July 2009; 16:50	Match 30	Score by quarters: 1-2, 1-1, 1-2, 2-2			Attendance: 1,000; Referees: Borrell (ESP), Margeta (SLO)
26 July 2009; 16:50	Match 30	Campbell, Whalan 2	Goals	Radu, Diaconu 2	Attendance: 1,000; Referees: Borrell (ESP), Margeta (SLO)

26 July 2009; 21:00	Match 29	Serbia	7–5	Italy	Attendance: 5,300; Referees: Tulga (TUR), Stravpopoulos (GRE)
26 July 2009; 21:00	Match 29	Score by quarters: 1-1, 3-2, 2-1, 1-1			Attendance: 5,300; Referees: Tulga (TUR), Stravpopoulos (GRE)
26 July 2009; 21:00	Match 29	Udovičić 2	Goals	Calcaterra 3	Attendance: 5,300; Referees: Tulga (TUR), Stravpopoulos (GRE)

=== 15th place ===
28 July 2009; 08:40	Match 31	South Africa	6–5	Kazakhstan	Attendance: 100; Referees: Wengenroth (SUI), Koganov (AZE)
28 July 2009; 08:40	Match 31	Score by quarters: 1-2, 3-1, 2-1, 0-1			Attendance: 100; Referees: Wengenroth (SUI), Koganov (AZE)
28 July 2009; 08:40	Match 31	Brown, Woods 2	Goals	Gaidukov, Gorovoy 2	Attendance: 100; Referees: Wengenroth (SUI), Koganov (AZE)

=== 13th place ===
28 July 2009; 10:00	Match 32	Brazil	16–15 (OT)	North Macedonia	Attendance: 150; Referees: Moner (EGY), Pinker (RSA)
28 July 2009; 10:00	Match 32	Score by quarters: 0-2, 6-2, 3-4, 2-3 OT: 1-0, 0-1, PSO: 4-3			Attendance: 150; Referees: Moner (EGY), Pinker (RSA)
28 July 2009; 10:00	Match 32	M. Franco, F. Franco 4	Goals	Krstic 4	Attendance: 150; Referees: Moner (EGY), Pinker (RSA)

=== Semifinals 9–12 places ===
28 July 2009; 11:20	Match 33	China	5–13	Montenegro	Attendance: 500; Referees: Ghafouri (IRI), Damcevski (MKD)
28 July 2009; 11:20	Match 33	Score by quarters: 1-2, 0-2, 1-5, 3-4			Attendance: 500; Referees: Ghafouri (IRI), Damcevski (MKD)
28 July 2009; 11:20	Match 33	Yu 4	Goals	Gojković 3	Attendance: 500; Referees: Ghafouri (IRI), Damcevski (MKD)

28 July 2009; 12:40	Match 34	Italy	6–8	Australia	Attendance: 600; Referees: Ciric (SRB), Spiegel (GER)
28 July 2009; 12:40	Match 34	Score by quarters: 2-2, 1-1, 2-3, 1-2			Attendance: 600; Referees: Ciric (SRB), Spiegel (GER)
28 July 2009; 12:40	Match 34	Calcaterra 3	Goals	Campbell 3	Attendance: 600; Referees: Ciric (SRB), Spiegel (GER)

=== Quarterfinals ===
28 July 2009; 14:00	Match 35	Hungary	9–10 (OT)	Serbia	Attendance: 2.000; Referees: Gomez (ITA), Borrell (ESP)
28 July 2009; 14:00	Match 35	Score by quarters: 2-4, 1-1, 4-2, 1-1 OT: 1-1, 0-1			Attendance: 2.000; Referees: Gomez (ITA), Borrell (ESP)
28 July 2009; 14:00	Match 35	Kiss 3	Goals	Udovičić, Prlainović 3	Attendance: 2.000; Referees: Gomez (ITA), Borrell (ESP)

28 July 2009; 15:20	Match 38	United States	8–5	Germany	Attendance: 1,000; Referees: Margeta (SLO), Peris (CRO)
28 July 2009; 15:20	Match 38	Score by quarters: 1-2, 1-0, 5-1, 1-2			Attendance: 1,000; Referees: Margeta (SLO), Peris (CRO)
28 July 2009; 15:20	Match 38	eight players 1	Goals	Politze 2	Attendance: 1,000; Referees: Margeta (SLO), Peris (CRO)

28 July 2009; 16:40	Match 36	Croatia	7–5	Romania	Attendance: 400; Referees: Turcotte (CAN), Sadekov (RUS)
28 July 2009; 16:40	Match 36	Score by quarters: 2-0, 1-1, 2-1, 2-3			Attendance: 400; Referees: Turcotte (CAN), Sadekov (RUS)
28 July 2009; 16:40	Match 36	Burić, Bošković 2	Goals	Radu 3	Attendance: 400; Referees: Turcotte (CAN), Sadekov (RUS)

28 July 2009; 21:00	Match 37	Spain	11–4	Canada	Attendance: 2,000; Referees: Brguljan (MNE), Flahive (AUS)
28 July 2009; 21:00	Match 37	Score by quarters: 1-2, 1-2, 6-0, 3-0			Attendance: 2,000; Referees: Brguljan (MNE), Flahive (AUS)
28 July 2009; 21:00	Match 37	García 3	Goals	four players 1	Attendance: 2,000; Referees: Brguljan (MNE), Flahive (AUS)

=== 11th place ===
30 July 2009; 09:00	Match 39	China	7–14	Italy	Attendance: 600; Referees: Matache (ROU), Rotsart (USA)
30 July 2009; 09:00	Match 39	Score by quarters: 2-4, 2-2, 1-5, 2-3			Attendance: 600; Referees: Matache (ROU), Rotsart (USA)
30 July 2009; 09:00	Match 39	Liang 3	Goals	Mistrangelo 4	Attendance: 600; Referees: Matache (ROU), Rotsart (USA)

=== 9th place ===
30 July 2009; 10:20	Match 40	Montenegro	8–7	Australia	Attendance: 600; Referees: Balfanbayev (KAZ), Stravropoulos (GRE)
30 July 2009; 10:20	Match 40	Score by quarters: 1-3, 2-1, 1-2, 4-1			Attendance: 600; Referees: Balfanbayev (KAZ), Stravropoulos (GRE)
30 July 2009; 10:20	Match 40	Ivović 3	Goals	Campbell 2	Attendance: 600; Referees: Balfanbayev (KAZ), Stravropoulos (GRE)

=== Semifinals 5–8 places ===
30 July 2009; 11:40	Match 41	Hungary	13–8	Romania	Attendance: 400; Referees: Borrell (ESP), Sedekov (RUS)
30 July 2009; 11:40	Match 41	Score by quarters: 3-1, 3-3, 4-2, 3-2			Attendance: 400; Referees: Borrell (ESP), Sedekov (RUS)
30 July 2009; 11:40	Match 41	Kiss 3	Goals	eight players 1	Attendance: 400; Referees: Borrell (ESP), Sedekov (RUS)

30 July 2009; 15:30	Match 42	Canada	5–9	Germany	Attendance: 800; Referees: Tulga (TUR), Koganov (AZE)
30 July 2009; 15:30	Match 42	Score by quarters: 0-2, 1-1, 1-3, 3-3			Attendance: 800; Referees: Tulga (TUR), Koganov (AZE)
30 July 2009; 15:30	Match 42	Boyd, Diggle 2	Goals	Politze 4	Attendance: 800; Referees: Tulga (TUR), Koganov (AZE)

=== Semifinals ===
30 July 2009; 16:50	Match 43	Serbia	12–11	Croatia	Attendance: 2.500; Referees: Gomez (ITA), Kiszelly (HUN)
30 July 2009; 16:50	Match 43	Score by quarters: 4-3, 3-3, 3-3, 2-2			Attendance: 2.500; Referees: Gomez (ITA), Kiszelly (HUN)
30 July 2009; 16:50	Match 43	Filipović 4	Goals	Bošković 3	Attendance: 2.500; Referees: Gomez (ITA), Kiszelly (HUN)

30 July 2009; 21:00	Match 44	Spain	7–6	United States	Attendance: 3.000; Referees: Margeta (SLO), Brguljan (MNE)
30 July 2009; 21:00	Match 44	Score by quarters: 1-2, 3-2, 1-1, 2-1			Attendance: 3.000; Referees: Margeta (SLO), Brguljan (MNE)
30 July 2009; 21:00	Match 44	Molina 3	Goals	Powers 2	Attendance: 3.000; Referees: Margeta (SLO), Brguljan (MNE)

=== 7th place ===
1 August 2009; 09:00	Match 45	Romania	9–6	Canada	Attendance: 400; Referees: Ciric (SRB), Reemnet (NED)
1 August 2009; 09:00	Match 45	Score by quarters: 2-1, 1-1, 3-3, 3-1			Attendance: 400; Referees: Ciric (SRB), Reemnet (NED)
1 August 2009; 09:00	Match 45	three players 2	Goals	Marks, Graham 2	Attendance: 400; Referees: Ciric (SRB), Reemnet (NED)

=== 5th place ===
1 August 2009; 10:40	Match 46	Hungary	9–6	Germany	Attendance: 600; Referees: Peris (CRO), Stavropoulos (GRE)
1 August 2009; 10:40	Match 46	Score by quarters: 4-1, 1-0, 3-1, 1-4			Attendance: 600; Referees: Peris (CRO), Stavropoulos (GRE)
1 August 2009; 10:40	Match 46	Hosnyánszky 3	Goals	Politze 3	Attendance: 600; Referees: Peris (CRO), Stavropoulos (GRE)

=== Bronze medal match ===
1 August 2009; 16:00	Match 47	Croatia	8–6	United States	Attendance: 2,000; Referees: Borrell (ESP), Flahive (AUS)
1 August 2009; 16:00	Match 47	Score by quarters: 2-3, 1-1, 2-0, 3-2			Attendance: 2,000; Referees: Borrell (ESP), Flahive (AUS)
1 August 2009; 16:00	Match 47	Barač, Obradović 2	Goals	Azevedo 2	Attendance: 2,000; Referees: Borrell (ESP), Flahive (AUS)

=== Gold medal match ===
1 August 2009; 21:00	Match 48	Serbia	14–13 (OT)	Spain	Attendance: 5.400; Referees: Margeta (SLO), Koganov (AZE)
1 August 2009; 21:00	Match 48	Score by quarters: 3-2, 0-0, 1-2, 2:2 OT: 1-1, 0-0 Pen 7:6			Attendance: 5.400; Referees: Margeta (SLO), Koganov (AZE)
1 August 2009; 21:00	Match 48	Udovičić 5	Goals	García 7	Attendance: 5.400; Referees: Margeta (SLO), Koganov (AZE)

== Final ranking ==
Gold medal	Serbia
Silver medal	Spain
Bronze medal	Croatia
4	United States
5	Hungary
6	Germany
7	Romania
8	Canada
9	Montenegro
10	Australia
11	Italy
12	China
13	Brazil
14	North Macedonia
15	South Africa
16	Kazakhstan

2009 FINA Men's World champions

Serbia
Fourth title

Team roster

Slobodan Soro, Marko Avramović, Živko Gocić, Vanja Udovičić, Slavko Gak, Duško Pijetlović, Slobodan Nikić, Milan Aleksić, Nikola Rađen, Filip Filipović, Andrija Prlainović, Stefan Mitrović, Gojko Pijetlović
Head coach: Dejan Udovičić.

== Medalists ==
Gold	Silver	Bronze
Serbia Slobodan Soro; Marko Avramović; Živko Gocić; Vanja Udovičić (c); Slavko Gak; Duško Pijetlović; Slobodan Nikić; Milan Aleksić; Nikola Rađen; Filip Filipović; Andrija Prlainović; Stefan Mitrović; Gojko Pijetlović Head coach: Dejan Udovičić	Spain Inaki Aguilar; Mario José García; David Martín; Blai Mallarach; Guillermo Molina; Marc Minguell; Iván Gallego; Albert Español; Xavier Vallès; Felipe Perrone; Iván Pérez (c); Xavier García; Daniel López Head coach: Rafael Aguilar	Croatia Ivo Brzica; Damir Burić; Miho Bošković; Nikša Dobud; Ivan Buljubašić; Srdan Antonijević; Frano Karač; Andro Bušlje; Sandro Sukno; Samir Barač (c); Igor Hinić; Paulo Obradović; Josip Pavić Head coach: Ratko Rudić

== Individual awards ==
- Most Valuable Player

- Vanja Udovičić (SRB)

- Best Goalkeeper

- Stefano Tempesti (ITA)

- Topscorer

- Filip Filipović (SRB) — 20 goals (2 in penalty shootout)
