= 2012 Men's European Water Polo Championship Qualifiers =

The qualifying competition for 2012 Men's European Water Polo Championship is a series of competitions to decide the qualifiers for 2012 Men's European Water Polo Championship.

== System ==
Date	Competition Name	Result
Aug - Sep 2010	2010 Men's European Water Polo Championship	Five pre-qualified
Oct 2010 - Jul 2011	Group Stage (6)	Top 2 advance to playoffs
Oct 2011	Playoffs (6)	Six qualified

== Pre-qualified ==
Netherlands (hosts)
Croatia (Winners, 2010 Men's European Water Polo Championship)
Italy (Finalists, 2010 Men's European Water Polo Championship)
Serbia (3rd Place, 2010 Men's European Water Polo Championship)
Hungary (4th Place, 2010 Men's European Water Polo Championship)
Montenegro (5th Place, 2010 Men's European Water Polo Championship)

== Draw ==
Draw Pot 1	
Germany	6th Place, 2010 Men's European Water Polo Championship
Romania	7th Place, 2010 Men's European Water Polo Championship
Spain	8th Place, 2010 Men's European Water Polo Championship
Greece	9th Place, 2010 Men's European Water Polo Championship
Turkey	10th Place, 2010 Men's European Water Polo Championship
Russia	11th Place, 2010 Men's European Water Polo Championship
Draw Pot 2	
North Macedonia	12th Place, 2010 Men's European Water Polo Championship
France	2010 Men's Qualification Tournament participant
Great Britain	2010 Men's Qualification Tournament participant
Malta	2010 Men's Qualification Tournament participant
Slovenia	2010 Men's Qualification Tournament participant
Slovakia	2010 Men's Qualification Tournament participant
Draw Pot 3	
Belarus	2009 Men's European B Tournament participant
Georgia	2009 Men's European B Tournament participant
Poland	2009 Men's European B Tournament participant
Switzerland	2009 Men's European B Tournament participant
Ukraine	2009 Men's European B Tournament participant
Draw Pot 4	
Bulgaria	
Israel	
Portugal	

=== Groups ===
Group A	Group B	Group C	Group D	Group E	Group F
Turkey	Germany	Spain	Russia	Greece	Romania
Malta	Slovenia	North Macedonia	France	Great Britain	Slovakia
Poland	Portugal	Belarus	Switzerland	Georgia	Ukraine
	Bulgaria				Israel

== Group stage ==
Team advances to Playoffs

=== Group A ===
Team	Pld	W	D	L	GF	GA	GD	Pts
Turkey	4	3	0	1	42	20	+22	9
Malta	4	2	1	1	23	30	−7	7
Poland	4	0	1	3	17	32	−15	1

30 October 2010; 16:30	Report	Malta	7–3	Poland	National Pool, Malta; Referees: Planchon Pascal (FRA), Buch Francesc Xavier (ESP)
30 October 2010; 16:30	Report	Score by quarters: 1–1, 2–1, 1–1, 3–0			National Pool, Malta; Referees: Planchon Pascal (FRA), Buch Francesc Xavier (ESP)

20 November 2010; 19:00	Report	Turkey	15–3	Malta	ENKA Schools, Istanbul; Referees: Damianakis Ilias (GRE), Donev Jordan (BUL)
20 November 2010; 19:00	Report	Score by quarters: 2–1, 4–1, 4–0, 5–1			ENKA Schools, Istanbul; Referees: Damianakis Ilias (GRE), Donev Jordan (BUL)

30 March 2011; 17:00	Report	Poland	4–10	Turkey	Gliwice; Referees: Adrian Alexandrescu (ROU), Eugeny Bobkov (BLR)
30 March 2011; 17:00	Report	Score by quarters: 2–2, 1–2, 0–2, 1–5			Gliwice; Referees: Adrian Alexandrescu (ROU), Eugeny Bobkov (BLR)

11 May 2011; 20:00	Report	Turkey	10–5	Poland	Istanbul; Referees: Lubomir Zurek (SVK), Irakli Kikalishvili (GEO)
11 May 2011; 20:00	Report	Score by quarters: 3–1, 2–0, 3–2, 2–2			Istanbul; Referees: Lubomir Zurek (SVK), Irakli Kikalishvili (GEO)

12 June 2011; 18:30	Report	Malta	8–7	Turkey	Msida

2 July 2011; 20:00	Report	Poland	5–5	Malta	Stetin

=== Group B ===
Team	Pld	W	D	L	GF	GA	GD	Pts
Germany	6	5	1	0	104	37	+67	16
Slovenia	6	4	1	1	99	49	+50	13
Portugal	6	2	0	4	45	67	−22	6
Bulgaria	6	0	0	6	28	123	−95	0

30 October 2010; 18:00	Report	Portugal	7–15	Germany	Clube Fluvial Portuense, Porto; Referees: Angileri Massimo (MLT), Kapinus Volodymyr (UKR)
30 October 2010; 18:00	Report	Score by quarters: 1–5, 1–5, 3–3, 2–2			Clube Fluvial Portuense, Porto; Referees: Angileri Massimo (MLT), Kapinus Volodymyr (UKR)

30 October 2010; 18:00	Report	Slovenia	31–5	Bulgaria	Žusterna, Koper; Referees: Bajenaru Andrei (ROU), Zurek Lubomir (SVK)
30 October 2010; 18:00	Report	Score by quarters: 7–2, 9–1, 7–0, 8–2			Žusterna, Koper; Referees: Bajenaru Andrei (ROU), Zurek Lubomir (SVK)

20 November 2010; 18:00	Report	Bulgaria	2–12	Portugal	Sports Palace Pool, Sofia; Referees: Levin Mark (ISR), Matache Radu (ROU)
20 November 2010; 18:00	Report	Score by quarters: 1–4, 0–2, 1–2, 0–4			Sports Palace Pool, Sofia; Referees: Levin Mark (ISR), Matache Radu (ROU)

21 November 2010; 14:00	Report	Germany	21–11	Slovenia	Hannover Swimming Stadium, Hannover; Referees: Wengenroth Martinelli Ursula (SUI), Teixido Jaume (ESP)
21 November 2010; 14:00	Report	Score by quarters: 5–4, 7–3, 3–1, 6–3			Hannover Swimming Stadium, Hannover; Referees: Wengenroth Martinelli Ursula (SUI), Teixido Jaume (ESP)

30 March 2011; 19:30	Report	Germany	24–6	Bulgaria	Referees: Maciej Michalak (POL), Luis Santos (POR)
30 March 2011; 19:30	Report	Score by quarters: 4–1, 9–1, 6–2, 5–2			Referees: Maciej Michalak (POL), Luis Santos (POR)

30 March 2011; 20:30	Report	Portugal	3–14	Slovenia	Porto; Referees: Vyacheslav Kostanda (UKR), Anne Grandin (FRA)
30 March 2011; 20:30	Report	Score by quarters: 0–7, 2–3, 0–2, 1–2			Porto; Referees: Vyacheslav Kostanda (UKR), Anne Grandin (FRA)

7 May 2011	Report	Bulgaria	2–19	Germany	Sofia; Referees: Nebojsa Stajkovic (MKD), Irfan Sadekov (RUS)
7 May 2011	Report	Score by quarters: 0–5, 1–7, 1–4, 0–3			Sofia; Referees: Nebojsa Stajkovic (MKD), Irfan Sadekov (RUS)

11 May 2011; 20:00	Report	Slovenia	10–8	Portugal	Kranj; Referees: Matan Schwarts (ISR), Nikolaos Boudramis (GRE)
11 May 2011; 20:00	Report	Score by quarters: 4–3, 2–3, 2–1, 2–1			Kranj; Referees: Matan Schwarts (ISR), Nikolaos Boudramis (GRE)

18 June 2011; 18:00	Report	Portugal	11–8	Bulgaria	Faro; Referees: Vladimir Gerzanich (RUS), Ladislau Vekerdy (ROU)
18 June 2011; 18:00	Report	Score by quarters: 3–3, 3–1, 2–2, 3–2			Faro; Referees: Vladimir Gerzanich (RUS), Ladislau Vekerdy (ROU)

18 June 2011; 20:00	Report	Slovenia	7–7	Germany	Kranj; Referees: Peter Balzan (MLT), Mete Kokaragac (TUR)
18 June 2011; 20:00	Report	Score by quarters: 2–1, 2–3, 2–1, 1–2			Kranj; Referees: Peter Balzan (MLT), Mete Kokaragac (TUR)

2 July 2011; 18:00	Report	Germany	18–4	Portugal	Wuppertal

2 July 2011; 19:00	Report	Bulgaria	5–26	Slovenia	Varna

=== Group C ===
Team	Pld	W	D	L	GF	GA	GD	Pts
Spain	4	4	0	0	47	20	+27	12
North Macedonia	4	2	0	2	35	33	+2	6
Belarus	4	0	0	4	22	51	−29	0

2 November 2010; 20:45	Report	Spain	15–3	Belarus	Nova Escullera, Barcelona; Referees: Kikalishvili Irakli (GEO), Nestorov Yavor (BUL)
2 November 2010; 20:45	Report	Score by quarters: 2–1, 6–1, 3–0, 4–1			Nova Escullera, Barcelona; Referees: Kikalishvili Irakli (GEO), Nestorov Yavor (BUL)

5 December 2010	Report	North Macedonia	6–10	Spain	Mladost Pool, Skopje; Referees: Spiegel Ulrich (GER), Delon Jean-Michel (FRA)
5 December 2010	Report	Score by quarters: 3–4, 1–4, 1–1, 1–1			Mladost Pool, Skopje; Referees: Spiegel Ulrich (GER), Delon Jean-Michel (FRA)

30 March 2011; 18:00	Report	Belarus	6–9	North Macedonia	Minsk; Referees: Matan Schwarts (ISR), Peter Kalinka (SVK)
30 March 2011; 18:00	Report	Score by quarters: 3–3, 1–0, 1–3, 1–3			Minsk; Referees: Matan Schwarts (ISR), Peter Kalinka (SVK)

11 May 2011; 20:00	Report	North Macedonia	15–7	Belarus	Skopje; Referees: Alban David (FRA), Volodymyr Kapinus (UKR)
11 May 2011; 20:00	Report	Score by quarters: 2–1, 5–2, 5–2, 3–2			Skopje; Referees: Alban David (FRA), Volodymyr Kapinus (UKR)

15 June 2011; 20:15	Report	Spain	10–5	North Macedonia	Terrassa; Referees: Gerwin Reinink (GER), Blazo Radonjic (SLO)
15 June 2011; 20:15	Report	Score by quarters: 2–2, 5–1, 1–1, 2–1			Terrassa; Referees: Gerwin Reinink (GER), Blazo Radonjic (SLO)

2 July 2011; 17:00	Report	Belarus	6–12	Spain	Minsk

=== Group D ===
Team	Pld	W	D	L	GF	GA	GD	Pts
France	4	3	1	0	71	22	+49	10
Russia	4	2	1	1	66	31	+35	7
Switzerland	4	0	0	4	16	100	−84	0

20 October 2010; 18:30	Report	France	33–2	Switzerland	Place Daniel-Rops, Aix-les-Baines; Referees: Arslanyan Sevan (TUR), Haentschel Genrot (GER)
20 October 2010; 18:30	Report	Score by quarters: 9–0, 9–0, 8–1, 7–1			Place Daniel-Rops, Aix-les-Baines; Referees: Arslanyan Sevan (TUR), Haentschel Genrot (GER)

20 November 2010; 15:00	Report	Russia	23–4	Switzerland	Olympic Pool, Kazan; Referees: Rozman Daniel (SLO), Barradas José (POR)
20 November 2010; 15:00	Report	Score by quarters: 7–1, 6–1, 6–0, 4–2			Olympic Pool, Kazan; Referees: Rozman Daniel (SLO), Barradas José (POR)

30 March 2011; 19:00	Report	Russia	8–8	France	Referees: Andreas Moiralis (GRE), Andrej Laginja (SLO)
30 March 2011; 19:00	Report	Score by quarters: 2–1, 2–0, 3–4, 1–3			Referees: Andreas Moiralis (GRE), Andrej Laginja (SLO)

11 May 2011; 20:00	Report	France	11–10	Russia	Nice; Referees: Adrian Vamos (ROU), Genrot Haentschel (GER)
11 May 2011; 20:00	Report	Score by quarters: 5–3, 1–2, 3–3, 2–2			Nice; Referees: Adrian Vamos (ROU), Genrot Haentschel (GER)

18 June 2011; 20:00	Report	Switzerland	8–25	Russia	Kreuzlingen; Referees: Hristo Gueorguiev (BUL), Peter Kalinka (SVK)
18 June 2011; 20:00	Report	Score by quarters: 3–5, 3–9, 1–6, 1–5			Kreuzlingen; Referees: Hristo Gueorguiev (BUL), Peter Kalinka (SVK)

20 July 2011; 20:00	Report	Switzerland	2–19	France	Lugano

=== Group E ===
Team	Pld	W	D	L	GF	GA	GD	Pts
Greece	4	4	0	0	54	20	+34	12
Georgia	4	1	0	3	30	38	−8	3
Great Britain	4	1	0	3	17	43	−26	3

30 Oct 2010; 18:30	Report	Georgia	9–3	Great Britain	Olympic Pool, Tbilisi; Referees: Koryzna Radoslaw (POL), Stankovik Gjorgje (MKD)
30 Oct 2010; 18:30	Report	Score by quarters: 5–1, 0–0, 1–2, 3–0			Olympic Pool, Tbilisi; Referees: Koryzna Radoslaw (POL), Stankovik Gjorgje (MKD)

20 Nov 2010; 15:00	Report	Great Britain	2–11	Greece	Manchester Aquatics Centre, Manchester; Referees: Dalli Mario (MLT), Sungu Mehmet (TUR)
20 Nov 2010; 15:00	Report	Score by quarters: 0–4, 0–2, 1–3, 1–4			Manchester Aquatics Centre, Manchester; Referees: Dalli Mario (MLT), Sungu Mehmet (TUR)

30 Mar 2011; 21:00	Report	Georgia	8–11	Greece	Tbilisi; Referees: Gerwin Reinink (GER), Cem Filiksac (TUR)
30 Mar 2011; 21:00	Report	Score by quarters: 3–3, 3–4, 1–3, 1–1			Tbilisi; Referees: Gerwin Reinink (GER), Cem Filiksac (TUR)

11 May 2011; 20:30	Report	Greece	16–6	Georgia	Athens; Referees: José Barradas (POR), Blazo Radonjic (SLO)
11 May 2011; 20:30	Report	Score by quarters: 1–2, 6–3, 5–0, 4–1			Athens; Referees: José Barradas (POR), Blazo Radonjic (SLO)

18 June 2011; 19:00	Report	Greece	14–4	Great Britain	Athens; Referees: Vyacheslav Kostanda (UKR), Valery Fogel (ISR)
18 June 2011; 19:00	Report	Score by quarters: 4–2, 2–0, 4–1, 4–1			Athens; Referees: Vyacheslav Kostanda (UKR), Valery Fogel (ISR)

2 July 2011; 18:00	Report	Great Britain	8–7	Georgia	Manchester

=== Group F ===
Team	Pld	W	D	L	GF	GA	GD	Pts
Romania	6	5	1	0	84	29	+55	16
Slovakia	6	4	1	1	85	38	+47	13
Ukraine	6	2	0	4	42	73	−31	6
Israel	6	0	0	6	22	93	−71	0

30 October 2010; 18:00	Report	Slovakia	18–9	Ukraine	Municipal Swimming Pool, Košice; Referees: Freebury Chris (GBR), Ramos Paulo (POR)
30 October 2010; 18:00	Report	Score by quarters: 3–1, 5–3, 5–1, 6–4			Municipal Swimming Pool, Košice; Referees: Freebury Chris (GBR), Ramos Paulo (POR)

30 October 2010; 18:00	Report	Israel	4–14	Romania	Wingate Institute, Netanya; Referees: Birakis Michalis (GRE), Vasenin Eduard (RUS)
30 October 2010; 18:00	Report	Score by quarters: 2–3, 0–3, 2–3, 0–5			Wingate Institute, Netanya; Referees: Birakis Michalis (GRE), Vasenin Eduard (RUS)

20 November 2010; 13:00	Report	Ukraine	8–0	Israel	Podvodnoho Sports Palace, Kyiv; Referees: Littlejohn Brian (GBR), Michalak Maciej (POL)
20 November 2010; 13:00	Report	Score by quarters: 2–0, 3–0, 2–0, 1–0			Podvodnoho Sports Palace, Kyiv; Referees: Littlejohn Brian (GBR), Michalak Maciej (POL)

20 November 2010; 18:00	Report	Romania	8–5	Slovakia	Ioan Alexandrescu Olympic Pool, Oradea; Referees: Bobkov Eugeny (BLR), Voevodin Arkadi (RUS)
20 November 2010; 18:00	Report	Score by quarters: 1–1, 2–1, 3–1, 2–2			Ioan Alexandrescu Olympic Pool, Oradea; Referees: Bobkov Eugeny (BLR), Voevodin Arkadi (RUS)

30 March 2011; 19:00	Report	Ukraine	6–19	Romania	Mariupol; Referees: Jordan Donev (BUL), Vladimir Gerzanich (RUS)
30 March 2011; 19:00	Report	Score by quarters: 2–3, 0–4, 3–7, 1–5			Mariupol; Referees: Jordan Donev (BUL), Vladimir Gerzanich (RUS)

30 March 2011; 20:45	Report	Israel	6–18	Slovakia	Netanya; Referees: Vakhtang Mebuke (GEO), Risto Dancevski (MKD)
30 March 2011; 20:45	Report	Score by quarters: 2–3, 1–8, 3–2, 0–5			Netanya; Referees: Vakhtang Mebuke (GEO), Risto Dancevski (MKD)

11 May 2011; 18:00	Report	Slovakia	24–3	Israel	Košice; Referees: Vladimir Savtchenko (BLR), Sevan Arslanyan (TUR)
11 May 2011; 18:00	Report	Score by quarters: 5–1, 6–0, 6–1, 7–1			Košice; Referees: Vladimir Savtchenko (BLR), Sevan Arslanyan (TUR)

11 May 2011; 18:00	Report	Romania	18–3	Ukraine	Oradea; Referees: Lukasz Krol (POL), Yavor Nestorov (BUL)
11 May 2011; 18:00	Report	Score by quarters: 4–0, 4–0, 3–2, 7–1			Oradea; Referees: Lukasz Krol (POL), Yavor Nestorov (BUL)

18 June 2011; 17:45	Report	Israel	5–11	Ukraine	Netanya; Referees: Paulo Ramos (POR), Damien Taylor (GBR)
18 June 2011; 17:45	Report	Score by quarters: 2–1, 0–3, 2–2, 1–5			Netanya; Referees: Paulo Ramos (POR), Damien Taylor (GBR)

18 June 2011; 18:00	Report	Slovakia	7–7	Romania	Košice; Referees: Nebojsa Stajkovic (MKD), Goran Kramer (SUI)
18 June 2011; 18:00	Report	Score by quarters: 1–3, 4–1, 1–1, 1–2			Košice; Referees: Nebojsa Stajkovic (MKD), Goran Kramer (SUI)

2 July 2011; 16:00	Report	Ukraine	5–13	Slovakia	Charkov

2 July 2011; 16:00	Report	Romania	18–4	Israel	Bukuresti

== Playoffs ==
The playoffs were played home-and-away in October 2012, with the winner advancing on aggregate goals scored over the two legs. Each group winner was drawn against each group runner-up. The winners of the playoffs qualified for the 2012 Men's European Water Polo Championship.

Team 1	Agg.	Team 2	1st leg	2nd leg
Germany	36-11	Malta	21-5	15-6
Greece	22-10	Slovakia	13-7	9-3
France	12-18	North Macedonia	8-6	4-12
Russia	10-24	Spain	6-13	4-11
Georgia	11-29	Romania	5-11	6-18
Slovenia	14-16	Turkey	5-7	9-9

=== First leg ===
1 October 2011; 16:00	Report	Russia	6–13	Spain	Kinef Water Sports Centre, Kirishi
1 October 2011; 16:00	Report	Score by quarters: 3–4, 2–4, 1–2, 0–3			Kinef Water Sports Centre, Kirishi
1 October 2011; 16:00	Report	Rekechinski 2	Goals	Molina, Perrone 3	Kinef Water Sports Centre, Kirishi

1 October 2011; 18:00	Report	France	8–6	North Macedonia	George Vallerey Pool, Paris
1 October 2011; 18:00	Report	Score by quarters: 1–1, 1–0, 4–4, 2–1			George Vallerey Pool, Paris
1 October 2011; 18:00	Report	Crousillat 3	Goals	Vuksanovic, Ivovic 2	George Vallerey Pool, Paris

1 October 2011; 19:00	Report	Georgia	5–11	Romania	Tbilisi
1 October 2011; 19:00	Report	Score by quarters: 2–2, 2–1, 1–4, 0–4			Tbilisi
1 October 2011; 19:00	Report	Chomakidze 2	Goals	Radu 3	Tbilisi

1 October 2011; 19:00	Report	Greece	13–7	Slovakia	Athens
1 October 2011; 19:00	Report	Score by quarters: 1–1, 6–2, 3–3, 3–1			Athens
1 October 2011; 19:00	Report	five players 2	Goals	Nizny, Famera 2	Athens

1 October 2011; 19:00	Report	Germany	21–5	Malta	Hamm
1 October 2011; 19:00	Report	Score by quarters: 9–1, 6–2, 3–1, 3–1			Hamm
1 October 2011; 19:00	Report	Oeler, Politze 4	Goals	Camilleri 3	Hamm

1 October 2011; 20:00	Report	Slovenia	5–7	Turkey	Kranj Sports Park
1 October 2011; 20:00	Report	Score by quarters: 0–0, 1–3, 3–2, 1–2			Kranj Sports Park
1 October 2011; 20:00	Report	five players 1	Goals	Beskardesler, Okman 2	Kranj Sports Park

=== Second leg ===
8 October 2011	Report	Malta	6–15	Germany

29 October 2011	Report	Romania	18–6	Georgia

29 October 2011	Report	Spain	11–4	Russia

29 October 2011	Report	North Macedonia	12–4	France

29 October 2011	Report	Slovakia	3–9	Greece

29 October 2011	Report	Turkey	9–9	Slovenia
