= 2012 FINA Men's Water Polo World League =

- League: FINA Water Polo World League
- Sport: Water Polo

FINA Men's Water Polo World League seasons
- ← 2011 2013 →

The 2012 FINA Men's Water Polo World League is played between November 2011 and June 2012 and open to all men's water polo national teams. After playing in groups within the same continent, eight teams qualify to play in a final tournament, called the Super Final in Almaty, Kazakhstan from 12–17 June 2012. The two teams that reach the final of the Super Final will be the first teams to quality for the water polo tournament of the 2013 World Aquatics Championships in Barcelona.

In the world league, there are specific rules that do not allow matches to end in a draw. If teams are level at the end of the 4th quarter of any world league match, the match will be decided by a penalty shootout. Teams earn points in the standings in group matches as follows:

- Match won in normal time - 3 points
- Match won in shootout - 2 points
- Match lost in shootout - 1 point
- Match lost in normal time - 0 points

== Draw ==
=== Americas ===
As there were only 4 entries, all teams in this region will play in a single group.

=== Asia/Oceania ===
As there were only 4 entries, all teams in this region will play in a single group.

=== Europe ===
There were 10 entries into the league from Europe, and these were drawn into two groups of three teams and one group of four teams. The teams were placed into groups based on their performance in the 2011 FINA Men's Water Polo World League along with Great Britain, host of the 2012 Olympic tournament.

Pool	Country	2011 FINA Men's Water Polo World League result	Drawn into Group
1	Italy	2nd, Super Final	A
1	Croatia	3rd, Super Final	B
1	Romania	2nd, Europe Group B (13 pts)	C
2	Spain	2nd, Europe Group A (11 pts)	C
2	Germany	3rd, Europe Group A (9 pts)	B
2	Russia	3rd, Europe Group B (6 pts, Diff -3)	A
3	Greece	3rd, Europe Group C (6 pts, Diff -7)	C
3	North Macedonia	4th, Europe Group A (2 pts)	B
3	Turkey	4th, Europe Group B (0 pts)	C
3	Great Britain	did not participate	A

== Americas League ==
All teams played the other teams twice. All matches were held in Orange County, California from 10–13 May 2012. USA and Brazil, the top two teams, advanced to the Super Final.

	Team	G	W	SOW	SOL	L	GF	GA	Diff	Points
1.	United States	4	4	0	0	0	56	11	45	12
2.	Brazil	4	2	0	0	2	24	39	-15	6
3.	Canada	4	0	0	0	4	19	49	-30	0

== Asia/Oceania League ==
All teams will play the other teams twice. The first round-robin will be held from 1–5 May 2012 at the Shanghai Oriental Sports Center in Shanghai and the second round-robin will be held from 8–12 May 2012 at the Chiba International Swimming Complex in Narashino, Chiba, Japan. Two teams advance to the Super Final, one of which must be Kazakhstan as they are the host.

	Team	G	W	SOW	SOL	L	GF	GA	Diff	Points
1.	Australia	6	6	0	0	0	80	25	+55	18
2.	China	6	3	0	0	3	40	55	-15	9
3.	Japan	6	3	0	0	3	49	53	-4	9
4.	Kazakhstan	6	0	0	0	6	28	64	-36	0

== Europe League ==
All teams play the other teams in their group home-and-away. The winner of each group advances to the Super Final.

Team advances to Super Final

=== Group A ===
	Team	G	W	SOW	SOL	L	GF	GA	Diff	Points
1.	Italy	4	4	0	0	0	54	16	+38	12
2.	Russia	4	2	0	0	2	32	43	-11	6
3.	Great Britain	4	0	0	0	4	24	51	-27	0

15 November 2011; 19:00 CET (UTC+1)	Italy	16–5	Russia	Viale Lazio, Civitavecchia

6 December 2011; 20:00 GMT (UTC+0)	Great Britain	6–14	Italy	Manchester Aquatics Centre, Manchester

11 January 2012; 18:30 MSD (UTC+4)	Russia	12–8	Great Britain	Kinef Water Sports Center, Kirishi

21 February 2012; 18:30 MSD (UTC+4)	Russia	4–10	Italy	Kinef Water Sports Center, Kirishi

6 March 2012; 20:30 CET (UTC+1)	Italy	14–1	Great Britain	Cremona Municipal Pool

20 March 2011; 20:00 GMT (UTC+0)	Great Britain	9–11	Russia	Manchester Aquatics Centre, Manchester

=== Group B ===
	Team	G	W	SOW	SOL	L	GF	GA	Diff	Points
1.	Croatia	4	3	1	0	0	48	33	+15	11
2.	Germany	4	1	0	2	1	41	45	-4	5
3.	North Macedonia	4	0	1	0	3	30	41	-11	2

15 November 2011; 18:00 CET (UTC+1)	Croatia	16–15	Germany	Dubrovnik City Pool
15 November 2011; 18:00 CET (UTC+1)	Shootout win	Goals		Dubrovnik City Pool

17 December 2011	Germany	8–5	North Macedonia	Schoeneberg Sports and Swimming Centre, Berlin

5 January 2012; 20:00 CET (UTC+1)	North Macedonia	8–9	Croatia	Central Olympic Pool, Skopje

14 February 2012	Germany	6–11	Croatia	Magdeburg Swimming Pool

6 March 2012; 17:00 CET (UTC+1)	Croatia	12–4	North Macedonia	Rijeka

15 March 2012; 20:15 CET (UTC+1)	North Macedonia	13–12	Germany	Mladost Swimming Pool, Skopje
15 March 2012; 20:15 CET (UTC+1)	Shootout win	Goals		Mladost Swimming Pool, Skopje

=== Group C ===
	Team	G	W	SOW	SOL	L	GF	GA	Diff	Points
1.	Spain	6	4	0	0	2	60	40	+20	12
1.	Romania	6	4	0	0	2	65	46	+19	12
1.	Greece	6	4	0	0	2	55	40	+15	12
4.	Turkey	6	0	0	0	6	27	81	-54	0

3 teams equal on points, therefore only the matches between each other are considered to break the tie - FINA By-Law 9.6.3

	Team	G	W	SOW	SOL	L	GF	GA	Diff	Points
1.	Spain	4	2	0	0	2	34	32	+2	6
2.	Greece	4	2	0	0	2	32	32	0	6
3.	Romania	4	2	0	0	2	33	35	-2	6

12 November 2011; 16:30 EET (UTC+2)	Romania	16–8	Turkey	Iona Alexandrescu Olympic Pool, Oradea

15 November 2011; 20:30 CET (UTC+1)	Spain	8–7	Greece	Horta Sports Union, Barcelona

6 December 2011; 17:00 EET (UTC+2)	Romania	9–8	Spain	Iona Alexandrescu Olympic Pool, Oradea

17 December 2011; 20:00 EET (UTC+2)	Greece	14–5	Turkey	Kapagerof Indoor Pool, Athens

5 January 2012; 20:00 EET (UTC+2)	Turkey	3–16	Romania	Enka Swimming Pool, Istanbul

7 January 2012; 19:00 EET (UTC+2)	Greece	9–7	Spain	Antonios Pepanos Indoor Pool, Patras

21 February 2012; 17:00 EET (UTC+2)	Romania	8–6	Greece	Iona Alexandrescu Olympic Pool, Oradea

21 February; 20:00 EET (UTC+2)	Turkey	5–14	Spain	Enka Swimming Pool, Istanbul

6 March 2012; 20:30 CET (UTC+1)	Spain	11–7	Romania	Barcelona Swimming Club

17 March 2012; 18:00 EET (UTC+2)	Turkey	3–9	Greece	Turkish Water Polo Federation Pool, Istanbul

20 March 2011; 20:00 EET(UTC+2)	Greece	10–9	Romania	Kapagerof Indoor Pool, Athens

20 March 2011; 20:30 CET (UTC+1)	Spain	12–3	Turkey	Sant Jordi Swimming Pool, Barcelona

== Super Final ==
The Super Final was held on 12–17 June 2012 in Almaty, Kazakhstan.

=== Preliminary round: Group A ===
	Team	G	W	SOW	SOL	L	GF	GA	Diff	Points
1.	Italy	3	3	0	0	0	30	24	+6	9
2.	United States	3	2	0	0	1	22	19	+3	6
3.	China	3	0	1	0	2	26	28	-2	2
4.	Kazakhstan	3	0	0	1	2	30	37	-7	1

June 12

Italy	10 – 9	China
United States	11 – 8	Kazakhstan

June 13

United States	6 – 4	China
Italy	13 – 10	Kazakhstan

June 14

Italy	7 – 5	United States
China	13 – 12	Kazakhstan

=== Preliminary round: Group B ===
	Team	G	W	SOW	SOL	L	GF	GA	Diff	Points
1.	Croatia	3	3	0	0	0	41	20	+21	9
2.	Spain	3	2	0	0	1	22	17	+5	6
3.	Australia	3	1	0	0	2	33	28	+5	3
4.	Brazil	3	0	0	0	3	12	43	-31	0

June 12

Croatia	14 – 11	Australia
Brazil	3 – 8	Spain

June 13

Croatia	7 – 6	Spain
Brazil	6 – 13	Australia

June 14

Croatia	20 – 3	Brazil
Australia	7 – 8	Spain

=== Quarter-finals ===
June 15

United States	7 – 5	Australia
Spain	11 – 1	China
Italy	14 – 1	Brazil
Kazakhstan	6 – 13	Croatia

=== Medal round ===
Semi-finals
June 16
Croatia	11
United States	10
June 16
Italy	7
Spain	9

Final
June 17
Croatia	18
Spain	17
Bronze-final
June 17
Italy	7
United States	6

=== 5th–8th places ===
Semi-finals
June 16
Kazakhstan	7
Australia	6
June 16
China	10
Brazil	7

5th-place match
June 17
Kazakhstan	7
China	5
7th-place match
June 17
Australia	13
Brazil	2

== Final ranking ==
RANK	TEAM
	Croatia
	Spain
	Italy
4.	United States
5.	Kazakhstan
6.	China
7.	Australia
8.	Brazil

2012 FINA Men's World League

Croatia
First title

=== Awards ===
Top Scorer	Player of the Tournament	Goalkeeper of the Tournament
(Croatia) Maro Jokovic	(Spain) Felipe Perrone	(Italy) Stefano Tempesti
