= Willem Wouter Gerritse =

Dutch water polo player (born 1983)

Personal information
- Nickname: WiWo Gerritse
- Nationality: Dutch
- Born: 1 January 1983 (age 42); Amersfoort, Netherlands
- Height: 1.96 m (6 ft 5 in)
- Weight: 100 kg (220 lb)
- Spouse: Sara Horvath (m. 2013)

Sport
- Country: Netherlands
- Sport: Water polo
- Club: UZSC
- Retired: 2017
- Now coaching: UZSC

Willem Wouter Gerritse (born 1 January 1983 in Amersfoort) is a Dutch ex-water polo player, who played for Hungarian top division side Egri VK and the Dutch national team. He ended his career as player at UZSC in Utrecht, where he made his debut as head coach for the men's first team in September 2014.

He is married with Sara Horvath since August 16, 2013. He met her while he was still playing water polo in Hungary.

His father, Wouter Gerritse, is also a water polo player, whereas his mother, Anke Rijnders, is an Olympic swimmer.
