= Andreas Miralis =

Greek water polo player

Personal information
- Born: 21 September 1987 (age 37); Athens, Greece

Sport
- Sport: Water polo

Andreas Miralis (born 21 September 1987) is a Greek water polo player. At the 2012 Summer Olympics, he competed for the Greece men's national water polo team in the men's event. He is 6 ft 0 inches tall.
