= North Macedonia men's national water polo team =

North Macedonia
- FINA code: MKD
- Confederation: LEN (Europe)

World Championship
- Appearances: 1 (first in 2009)
- Best result: 14

World League
- Appearances: 3 (first in 2010)

European Championship
- Appearances: 3 (first in 2008)
- Best result: 8th place (2008)

North Macedonia men's national water polo team
Medal record

Representing North Macedonia

Men's water polo

Universiade
| Bronze medal – third place | 2011 Shenzhen | Team competition |

The North Macedonia men's national water polo team was formed in 1991, following the Republic of Macedonia's declaration of independence. Before 1991, the Republic of Macedonia was part of Yugoslavia, and its players participated in the Yugoslavia national water polo team.

The first major event that the team qualified for was the 2008 Men's European Water Polo Championship, finishing in 8th place.

== Results ==
=== World Championship ===
Within Yugoslavia team

1973 (3rd), 1975 (13), 1978 (3rd), 1982 (7), 1986 (1st), 1991 (1st)

- 2009 – 14th place

=== FINA World League ===
- 2010 – 19th place
- 2011 – 16th place
- 2012 – Preliminary round

=== European Championship ===
Within Yugoslavia team

1927 (9), 1934 (5), 1947 (8), 1950 (3rd), 1954 (2nd), 1958 (2nd), 1962 (2nd), 1966 (3rd)
1970 (3rd), 1974 (3rd), 1977 (2nd), 1981 (4th), 1983 (4th), 1985 (2nd), 1987 (2nd), 1989 (2nd), 1991 (1st)

- 2008 – 8th place
- 2010 – 12th place
- 2012 – 11th place

=== Universiade ===
- 2011 – Bronze medal

== Current squad ==
| no. | name | position | right/ left | date of birth |
|---|---|---|---|---|
| 1 | Dalibor Perčinić | GK | R | 1976 |
| 2 | Igor Milanovic | D | R | 1992 |
| 3 | Ivan Vuksanović | CF | R | 1981 |
| 4 | Zdravko Delaš | CF | R | 1982 |
| 5 | Nenad Bosančić | CF | L | 1982 |
| 6 | Vladimir Krecković | CB | R | 1980 |
| 7 | Blagoje Ivović | CB | R | 1980 |
| 8 | Edi Brkić | CF | L | 1974 |
| 9 | Dimitar Dimovski | CB | R | 1992 |
| 10 | Vladimir Latković | CF | R | 1981 |
| 11 | Nenad Petrović (C) | D | R | 1977 |
| 12 | Danijel Benić | CF | R | 1977 |
| 13 | Bojan Janevski | CK | R | 1990 |

Coach: Stevan Nonković
