= Péter Biros =

Hungarian water polo player (born 1976)

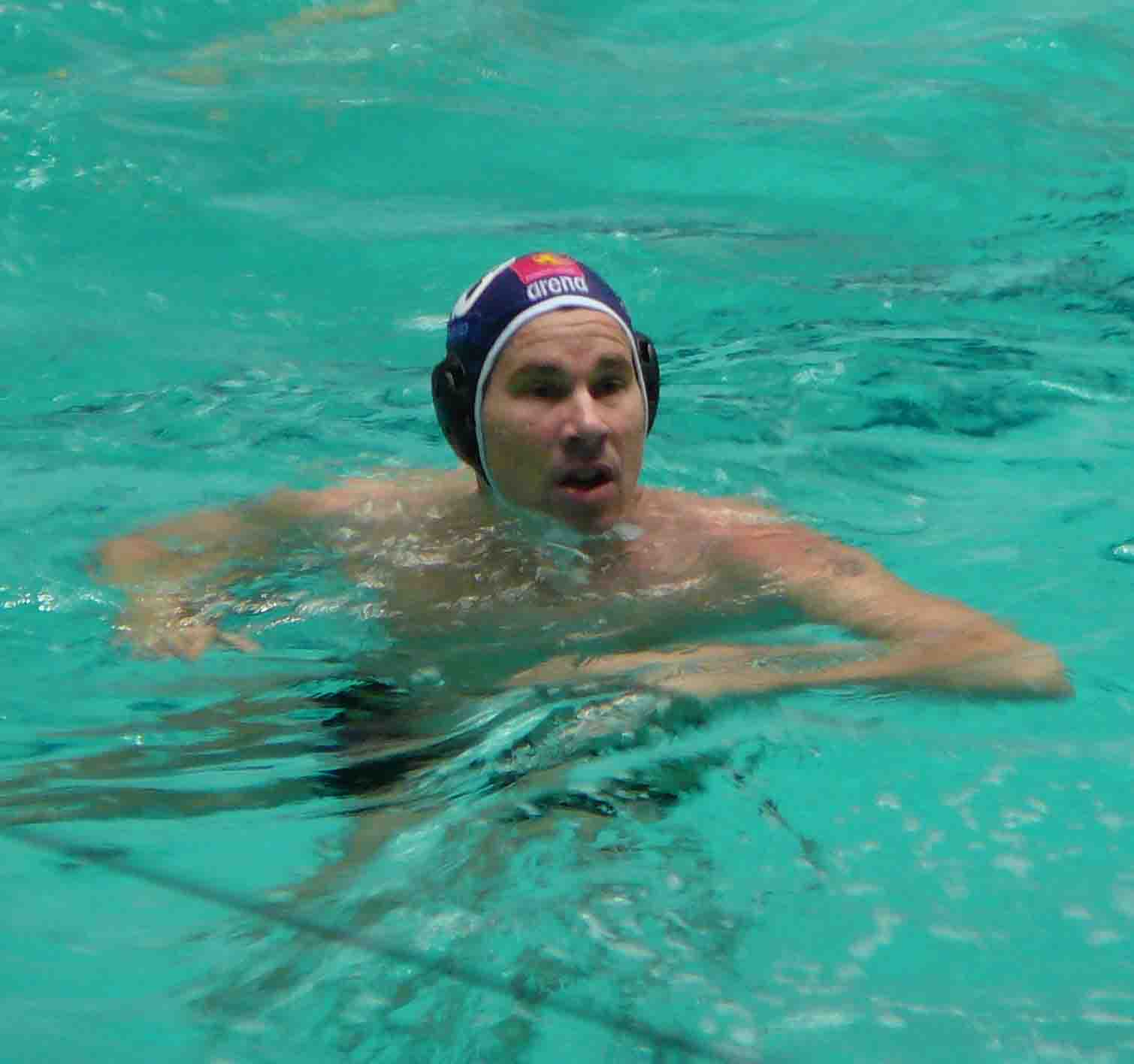
- Biros in 2007

Personal information
- Nickname: Fácán
- Nationality: Hungarian
- Born: 5 April 1976 (age 50) Miskolc, Hungary
- Height: 1.94 m (6 ft 4 in)
- Weight: 94 kg (207 lb)

Sport
- Sport: Water polo
- Handedness: Right
- Position: Driver
- Current club: Eger women's (head coach)

Youth career
- Years: Team
- –: Miskolci VSC

Senior clubs
- Years: Team
- –1995: Miskolci VSC
- 1995–1997: ÚVMK Eger
- 1997–1999: UTE-Taxi 2000
- 1999–2000: Primorje Rijeka
- 2000–2001: NIS Naftagas-Bečej
- 2001–2007: Domino-BHSE
- 2007–2016: ZF-Eger
- 2013: → San Giljan (Summer League)
- 2014–2015: → Neptunes (Summer League)
National team
- Years: Team
- 1997–2012: Hungary

Teams coached
- 2016–: ZF-Eger women's
Medal record
Men's water polo
Representing Hungary
Olympic Games
Gold medal – first place	2000 Sydney	Team competition
Gold medal – first place	2004 Athens	Team competition
Gold medal – first place	2008 Beijing	Team competition
World Championships
Gold medal – first place	2003 Barcelona	Team competition
Silver medal – second place	2005 Montréal	Team competition
Silver medal – second place	2007 Melbourne	Team competition
European Championship
Gold medal – first place	1999 Florence	Team competition
Silver medal – second place	2006 Belgrade	Team competition
Bronze medal – third place	2001 Budapest	Team competition
Bronze medal – third place	2003 Kranj	Team competition
Bronze medal – third place	2008 Malaga	Team competition
Bronze medal – third place	2012 Eindhoven	Team competition
FINA World League
Gold medal – first place	2003 New York	Team competition
Gold medal – first place	2004 Long Beach	Team competition
Silver medal – second place	2005 Belgrade	Team competition
Silver medal – second place	2007 Berlin	Team competition
Bronze medal – third place	2002 Patras	Team competition
FINA World Cup
Gold medal – first place	1999 Sydney	Team competition
Silver medal – second place	2002 Belgrade	Team competition
Silver medal – second place	2006 Budapest	Team competition

Péter Biros (born 5 April 1976) is a Hungarian former water polo player, who played on the gold medal squads at the 2000 Summer Olympics, 2004 Summer Olympics and 2008 Summer Olympics, which makes him one of six male athletes who won three Olympic gold medals in water polo. ( Kiss Szecsi Molnar Kasas Benedek Biros) He also competed at the 2012 Summer Olympics.

He is nicknamed Fácán, meaning 'pheasant', and made his debut for the national side in 1997, during an international tournament in Seville, Spain.

After the 2008 Olympics final, Biros revealed that he performed the entire tournament with a cyst by his heart, something that was unknown to the entire team and coaches alike. He insisted that he played with the consent of his doctors, and received a Fair Play award afterwards for it. He was given the honour to carry the national flag of Hungary at the opening ceremony of the 2012 Summer Olympics in London, becoming the 23rd water polo player to be a flag bearer at the opening and closing ceremonies of the Olympics.

== Honours ==
=== National ===
- Olympic Games: Gold medal - 2000, 2004, 2008
- World Championships: Gold medal - 2003; Silver medal - 2005, 2007
- European Championship: Gold medal - 1999; Silver medal - 2006; Bronze medal - 2001, 2003, 2008, 2012
- FINA World League: Gold medal - 2003, 2004; Silver medal - 2005, 2007; Bronze medal - 2002
- FINA World Cup: Gold medal - 1999; Silver medal - 2006, 2006

=== Club ===
- Euroleague Winners (1): (2004 - with Bp. Honvéd)
- LEN Cup Winners (1): (1999 - with UTE)
- LEN Super Cup Winner (1): (2004 - with Bp. Honvéd)
- Hungarian Championship (OB I): 8x (2002, 2003, 2004, 2005, 2006 - with Bp. Honvéd; 2011, 2013, 2014 - with Eger)
- Hungarian Cup (Magyar Kupa): 4x (2006 - with Bp. Honvéd; 2007, 2008, 2015 - with Eger)
- Hungarian SuperCup (Szuperkupa): 1x (2005 - with Bp. Honvéd)
- Yugoslavian Championship: 1x (2001 - with Bečej)
- Yugoslavian Cup: 1x (2001 - with Bečej)

=== Individual ===
- OB I top scorer (Hungarian Championship): 2001–02
- Prva HVL top scorer (Croatia Championship): 1999–2000

== Awards ==
- Member of the Hungarian team of year: 1999, 2000, 2003, 2004, 2008
- Hungarian Water Polo Player of the Year: 2001, 2003, 2005, 2008, 2011
- Honorary Citizen of Eger (2008)
- Honorary Citizen of Budapest (2008)
- Best European player of year (LEN): 2008
- Best Water Polo Player of the Year (Swimming World): 2009
- UNESCO Fair Play Award (2009)
- Ministerial Certificate of Merit (2012)
- Member of International Swimming Hall of Fame (2015)

Orders

- Officer's Cross of the Order of Merit of the Republic of Hungary (2000)
- Commander's Cross of the Order of Merit of the Republic of Hungary (2004)
- Commander's Cross of the Order of Merit of the Republic of Hungary with the Star (2008)

== See also ==
- Hungary men's Olympic water polo team records and statistics
- List of multiple Olympic gold medalists in one event
- List of Olympic champions in men's water polo
- List of Olympic medalists in water polo (men)
- List of players who have appeared in multiple men's Olympic water polo tournaments
- List of men's Olympic water polo tournament top goalscorers
- List of flag bearers for Hungary at the Olympics
- List of world champions in men's water polo
- List of World Aquatics Championships medalists in water polo
- List of members of the International Swimming Hall of Fame

Awards
Preceded by (Hungary) Tamás Kásás	Most Valuable Player of Water Polo European Championship; 2008	Succeeded by (Serbia) Vanja Udovičić
Olympic Games
Preceded by Zoltán Kammerer	Flagbearer for Hungary; London 2012	Succeeded by Áron Szilágyi
