= 2008 Men's European Water Polo Championship =

The 2008 Men's European Water Polo Championship was the 28th edition of the bi-annual event, organised by the Europe's governing body in aquatics, the Ligue Européenne de Natation. The event took place in the Aquatic Centre Málaga in Málaga, Spain from July 4 to July 13, 2008. The gold medal was won by Montenegro, the silver medal by Serbia and the bronze medal by Hungary.

== Teams ==
GROUP A

- Spain
- Croatia
- Slovakia
- Greece
- Hungary
- Montenegro

GROUP B

- Macedonia
- Russia
- Serbia
- Italy
- Germany
- Romania

== Preliminary round ==
=== Group A ===
| | Team | Points | G | W | D | L | GF | GA | Diff |
|---|---|---|---|---|---|---|---|---|---|
| 1. | Montenegro | 12 | 5 | 4 | 0 | 1 | 48 | 37 | +11 |
| 2. | Hungary | 12 | 5 | 4 | 0 | 1 | 54 | 32 | +22 |
| 3. | Croatia | 10 | 5 | 3 | 1 | 1 | 52 | 38 | +14 |
| 4. | Spain | 6 | 5 | 2 | 0 | 3 | 42 | 38 | +4 |
| 5. | Greece | 4 | 5 | 1 | 1 | 3 | 42 | 41 | +1 |
| 6. | Slovakia | 0 | 5 | 0 | 0 | 5 | 19 | 71 | −52 |

July 4, 2008

| 9:30 | Slovakia | 3 – 12 | Greece | (1–2, 1–3, 0–2, 1–5) |
| 19:30 | Hungary | 10 – 9 | Croatia | (2–1, 3–3, 2–1, 3–4) |
| 21:00 | Spain | 7 – 8 | Montenegro | (1–1, 2–2, 2–2, 2–3) |

July 5, 2008

| 11:00 | Hungary | 19 – 3 | Slovakia | (5–1, 5–1, 6–1, 3–0) |
| 19:30 | Montenegro | 11 – 10 | Greece | (4–3, 1–4, 3–1, 3–2) |
| 21:00 | Spain | 7 – 11 | Croatia | (2–4, 2–2, 2–3, 1–2) |

July 6, 2008

| 12:30 | Hungary | 8 – 3 | Greece | (3–2, 2–1, 1–0, 2–0) |
| 18:00 | Croatia | 7 – 6 | Montenegro | (2–0, 2–1, 0–3, 3–2) |
| 21:00 | Slovakia | 4 – 12 | Spain | (2–3, 1–2, 1–2, 0–5) |

July 7, 2008

| 11:00 | Croatia | 15 – 5 | Slovakia | (4–0, 3–1, 5–2, 3–2) |
| 19:30 | Hungary | 9 – 10 | Montenegro | (2–2, 3–2, 1–2, 3–4) |
| 21:00 | Spain | 9 – 7 | Greece | (2–2, 2–1, 2–2, 3–2) |

July 8, 2008

| 9:30 | Slovakia | 4 – 13 | Montenegro | (0–3, 1–2, 2–4, 1–4) |
| 18:00 | Greece | 10–10 | Croatia | (1–0, 2–3, 3–3, 4–4) |
| 21:00 | Hungary | 8 – 7 | Spain | (2–1, 2–3, 2–1, 2–2) |

=== Group B ===
| | Team | Points | G | W | D | L | GF | GA | Diff |
|---|---|---|---|---|---|---|---|---|---|
| 1. | Serbia | 13 | 5 | 4 | 1 | 0 | 68 | 31 | +37 |
| 2. | Italy | 12 | 5 | 4 | 0 | 1 | 55 | 35 | +20 |
| 3. | Germany | 9 | 5 | 3 | 0 | 2 | 39 | 42 | −3 |
| 4. | Macedonia | 4 | 5 | 1 | 1 | 3 | 35 | 56 | −21 |
| 5. | Romania | 4 | 5 | 1 | 1 | 3 | 37 | 46 | −9 |
| 6. | Russia | 1 | 5 | 0 | 1 | 4 | 35 | 59 | −24 |

July 4, 2008

| 11:00 | Macedonia | 10 – 6 | Romania | (3–1, 3–3, 3–2, 1–0) |
| 12:30 | Serbia | 17 – 5 | Germany | (2–1, 5–1, 6–2, 4–1) |
| 18:00 | Russia | 6 – 12 | Italy | (1–1, 2–2, 1–5, 2–4) |

July 5, 2008

| 9:30 | Macedonia | 6 – 23 | Serbia | (1–7, 1–6, 2–4, 2–6) |
| 12:30 | Germany | 13 – 4 | Russia | (3–1, 2–0, 5–2, 3–1) |
| 18:00 | Romania | 7 – 12 | Italy | (0–4, 2–3, 3–2, 2–3) |

July 6, 2008

| 9:30 | Russia | 9–9 | Macedonia | (1–2, 4–2, 3–5, 1–0) |
| 11:00 | Serbia | 6–6 | Romania | (1–2, 2–1, 2–2, 1–1) |
| 19:30 | Italy | 12 – 6 | Germany | (2–1, 1–1, 4–2, 5–2) |

July 7, 2008

| 9:30 | Romania | 4 – 8 | Germany | (1–2, 2–1, 0–3, 1–2) |
| 12:30 | Macedonia | 5 – 11 | Italy | (1–4, 2–2, 1–2, 1–3) |
| 18:00 | Serbia | 11 – 6 | Russia | (5–1, 1–2, 2–1, 3–2) |

July 8, 2008

| 11:00 | Germany | 7 – 5 | Macedonia | (1–1, 2–1, 1–1, 3–2) |
| 12:30 | Russia | 10 – 14 | Romania | (4–3, 4–3, 1–6, 1–2) |
| 19:30 | Italy | 8 – 11 | Serbia | (2–2, 3–1, 3–5, 0–3) |

== Final round ==
=== Places 7/12 ===
July 9, 2008

| 16:30 | Greece | 4 – 9 | Russia | (0–1, 2–2, 1–3, 1–3) |
| 18:00 | Slovakia | 6 – 7 | Romania | (1–2, 3–1, 1–2, 1–2) |

July 11, 2008

| 16:30 | Russia | 11 – 13 | Macedonia | (2–3, 2–3, 2–2, 4–2, 0–1, 1–2) |
| 18:00 | Romania | 7 – 9 | Spain | (2–3, 1–3, 1–1, 3–2) |

==== Places 11 / 12 ====
July 11, 2008

| 12:30 | Greece | 14 – 8 | Slovakia | (3–3, 2–1, 4–2, 5–2) |

==== Places 9 / 10 ====
July 12, 2008

| 9:30 | Romania | 11 – 6 | Russia | (2–0, 2–1, 4–3, 3–2) |

==== Places 7 / 8 ====
July 12, 2008

| 11:00 | Spain | 15 – 5 | Macedonia | (5–2, 2–1, 4–1, 4–1) |

=== Quarterfinals ===
July 9, 2008

| 19:30 | Hungary | 14 – 8 | Germany | (5–2, 2–1, 4–3, 2–2) |
| 21:00 | Croatia | 8 – 7 | Italy | (4–2, 0–0, 3–2, 1–3) |

=== Semifinals ===
July 11, 2008

| 19:30 | Croatia | 7 – 9 | Montenegro | (2–0, 2–4, 2–2, 1–3) |
| 21:00 | Hungary | 7 – 8 | Serbia | (0–0, 1–3, 3–1, 3–3, 0–1, 0–0) |

=== Finals ===
==== Places 5 / 6 ====
July 12, 2008

| 12:30 | Germany | 7 – 9 | Italy | (2–3, 3–2, 1–2, 1–2) |

==== Bronze Medal ====
July 13, 2008

| 19:30 | Hungary | 15 – 14 | Croatia | (3–1, 2–4, 5–5, 3–3, 0–1, 2–0) |

==== Gold Medal ====
July 13, 2008 – Malaga, Spain

| 21:00 | Serbia | 5 – 6 | Montenegro | (1–2, 3–0, 0–2, 1–1, 0–1, 0–0) |

== Final ranking ==
| RANK | TEAM |
|---|---|
| | Montenegro |
| | Serbia |
| | Hungary |
| 4. | Croatia |
| 5. | Italy |
| 6. | Germany |
| 7. | Spain |
| 8. | Macedonia |
| 9. | Romania |
| 10. | Russia |
| 11. | Greece |
| 12. | Slovakia |

2008 Men's European champion

Montenegro
First title

== Individual awards ==
- Most Valuable Player
  - Péter Biros (HUN)
- Best Goalkeeper
  - Denis Šefik (SRB)
- Topscorer
  - Aleksandar Šapić (SRB) (23)
