= 2011 FINA Men's Water Polo World League =

- League: FINA Water Polo World League
- Sport: Water Polo

FINA Men's Water Polo World League seasons
- ← 2010 2012 →

The 2011 FINA Men's Water Polo World League was the tenth edition of the annual event, organised by the world's governing body in aquatics, the FINA. After a preliminary round, the Super Final was held in Florence, Italy, from 21 to 26 June 2011. Serbia ended up being champions, defending the title acquired the previous year and was the first team to qualify for the 2012 Olympic men's water polo tournament.

== Preliminary round ==
Team qualified for Super Final

=== Africa ===
The African tournament was supposed to be held in Algiers, Algeria from May 13–15, but was cancelled.

=== Americas ===
The American preliminary round was held in Costa Mesa, California, United States from May 13–15. United States advanced to the Super Final.

Team	G	W	L	GF	GA	Diff	Pts
United States	2	2	0	16	11	+5	6
Canada	2	0	2	11	16	−5	0

=== Asia/Oceania ===
The Asia and Oceania region was feature a two-legged tournament, in Auckland, New Zealand (May 9–13) and Sydney, Australia (May 16–20). The four teams played a round robin in each location, with the results from both legs combined. Australia and China advanced to the Super Final.

Team	G	W	L	GF	GA	Diff	Pts
Australia	8	8	0	110	47	+63	24
China	8	6	2	72	65	+7	17
Japan	8	4	4	86	61	+25	12
Kazakhstan	8	2	6	76	81	−5	7
New Zealand	8	0	8	44	134	−90	0

=== Europe ===
Europe was divided into three groups of four teams, with qualifying spots for the winner of each group as well as Super Final host Italy. Rather than the condensed tournament style competition of the other continents, the European matches were played in a home-and-away format over five months.

==== Group A ====
Team	G	W	L	GF	GA	Diff	Pts
Serbia	6	5	1	70	45	+25	14
Spain	6	3	3	60	60	0	11
Germany	6	3	3	58	63	−4	9
North Macedonia	6	1	5	44	65	−21	2

==== Group B ====
Team	G	W	L	GF	GA	Diff	Pts
Montenegro	6	6	0	75	30	+45	17
Romania	6	4	2	54	48	+6	13
Russia	6	2	4	49	52	−3	6
Turkey	6	0	6	20	68	−48	0

==== Group C ====
Team	G	W	L	GF	GA	Diff	Pts
Croatia	6	6	0	68	41	+27	17
Italy	6	4	2	57	41	+16	13
Greece	6	2	4	42	49	−7	6
Netherlands	6	0	6	31	67	−36	0

== Super Final ==
The Super Final was held in Florence, Italy from 21 to 26 June.

=== Group A ===
Team	G	W	L	GF	GA	Diff	Pts
Serbia	3	3	0	37	19	+18	8
Italy	3	2	1	34	26	+8	7
United States	3	1	2	22	27	−5	3
China	3	0	3	17	38	−21	0

June 21

Serbia	13 – 2	China
Italy	10 – 4	United States

June 22

United States	13 – 6	China
Serbia	13 – 12	Italy

June 23

Serbia	11 – 5	United States
China	9 – 12	Italy

=== Group B ===
Team	G	W	L	GF	GA	Diff	Pts
Croatia	3	3	0	36	19	+17	9
Montenegro	3	2	1	21	22	−1	5
Australia	3	1	2	24	28	−4	4
Canada	3	0	3	22	34	−12	0

June 21

Montenegro	8 – 6	Canada
Australia	6 – 12	Croatia

June 22

Montenegro	5 – 11	Croatia
Australia	13 – 8	Canada

June 23

Montenegro	8 – 5	Australia
Canada	8 – 13	Croatia

=== Quarter-finals ===
June 24

Italy	7 – 6	Australia
United States	10 – 9	Montenegro
Serbia	19 – 7	Canada
China	5 – 15	Croatia

=== Medal round ===
Semi-finals
June 25
Italy	13
Croatia	11
June 25
United States	5
Serbia	8

Final
June 26
Italy	7
Serbia	8
Bronze-final
June 26
Croatia	11
United States	5

=== 5th–8th places ===
Semi-finals
June 25
Australia	14
China	4
June 25
Montenegro	16
Canada	7

5th place match
June 26
Australia	7
Montenegro	8
7th place match
June 26
China	9
Canada	10

== Final ranking ==
RANK	TEAM
	Serbia
	Italy
	Croatia
4.	United States
5.	Montenegro
6.	Australia
7.	Canada
8.	China

2011 FINA Men's World League

Serbia
Sixth title

=== Awards ===
The awards were announced on 1 July 2011.

Top Scorer	(Serbia) Filip Filipović (Croatia) Sandro Sukno
