= Montenegrin water polo clubs in European competitions =

Montenegrin water polo clubs have participated in the LEN competitions since the season 1986-97.
The first team which ever competed at the European cups was VK Primorac Kotor. Except them, in LEN competitions played also PVK Jadran Herceg Novi, VK Budva, VA Cattaro Kotor and PVK Val Prčanj.
The biggest success in the history of Montenegrin waterpolo was that of VK Primorac, who won the title in LEN Champions League 2009. Another Montenegrin holder of European trophy is VA Cattaro.
Among the titles which Montenegrin teams won in LEN competitions are:

- LEN Champions League:
  - VK Primorac Kotor: 2009
- LEN Cup:
  - VA Cattaro Kotor: 2010

== List of matches ==
Below is a list of games of all Montenegrin clubs in LEN competitions.

Season	Competition	Round	Montenegrin team	Opponent	Home	Away
1986-87	LEN Champions League	Group A	VK Primorac Kotor	(Romania) Crişul Oradea	9-4	
1986-87	LEN Champions League	Group A	VK Primorac Kotor	(Slovakia) Košice	10-8	
1986-87	LEN Champions League	Group A	VK Primorac Kotor	(Hungary) Újpest	7-5	
1986-87	LEN Champions League	Semifinals	VK Primorac Kotor	(Germany) Spandau 04	6-5	2-7
1995-96	LEN Cup Winners' Cup	Round 1	VK Budva	(Ukraine) Sevastopol	11-6	
1995-96	LEN Cup Winners' Cup	Round 1	VK Budva	(Israel) Hapoel Haifa	16-6	
1995-96	LEN Cup Winners' Cup	Round 1	VK Budva	(Italy) Roma	12-13	
1995-96	LEN Cup Winners' Cup	Round 1	VK Budva	(Greece) Patras	4-6	
1996-97	LEN Cup Winners' Cup	Round 1	VK Budva	(Austria) Klagenfurt	19-3	
1996-97	LEN Cup Winners' Cup	Round 1	VK Budva	(Germany) Rote Erde Hamm	15-6	
1996-97	LEN Cup Winners' Cup	Round 1	VK Budva	(France) Olympic Nice	8-5	
1996-97	LEN Cup Winners' Cup	Round 1	VK Budva	(Italy) Pescara	7-5	
1996-97	LEN Cup Winners' Cup	Quarterfinals	VK Budva	(Russia) Spartak Volgograd	8-4	4-7
1996-97	LEN Cup Winners' Cup	Semifinals	VK Budva	(Greece) Vouliagmeni	4-5	7-7
1996-97	LEN Cup	Round 1	PVK Jadran Herceg Novi	(Greece) Ethnikos Piraeus	8-7	
1996-97	LEN Cup	Round 1	PVK Jadran Herceg Novi	(England) West London Penguin	16-3	
1996-97	LEN Cup	Round 1	PVK Jadran Herceg Novi	(Denmark) KVIK Kastrup	21-4	
1996-97	LEN Cup	Round 1	PVK Jadran Herceg Novi	(Spain) Catalunya	9-10	
1996-97	LEN Cup	Round 2	PVK Jadran Herceg Novi	(Germany) Würzburg	4-8	
1996-97	LEN Cup	Round 2	PVK Jadran Herceg Novi	(Italy) Florentia	6-12	
1996-97	LEN Cup	Round 2	PVK Jadran Herceg Novi	(Croatia) Jug Dubrovnik	4-13	
1997-98	LEN Cup Winners' Cup	Round 1	VK Budva	(France) Lotto	14-4	
1997-98	LEN Cup Winners' Cup	Round 1	VK Budva	(Ukraine) Dynamo Lviv	12-7	
1997-98	LEN Cup Winners' Cup	Round 1	VK Budva	(Spain) Catalunya	6-7	
1997-98	LEN Cup Winners' Cup	Quarterfinals	VK Budva	(Hungary) Ferencváros Budapest	6-7	6-9
1998-99	LEN Cup Winners' Cup	Round 1	VK Budva	(Hungary) Ferencváros Budapest	4-9	
1998-99	LEN Cup Winners' Cup	Round 1	VK Budva	(Slovakia) Slávia Bratislava	4-2	
1998-99	LEN Cup Winners' Cup	Round 1	VK Budva	(Netherlands) Polar Bears Ede	12-10	
1998-99	LEN Cup Winners' Cup	Quarterfinals	VK Budva	(Italy) Florentia	6-6	6-11
1998-99	LEN Cup	Round 1	VK Primorac Kotor	(Croatia) Jug Dubrovnik	5-7	
1998-99	LEN Cup	Round 1	VK Primorac Kotor	(Italy) Pro Recco	12-10	
1998-99	LEN Cup	Round 1	VK Primorac Kotor	(Greece) Chania	11-9	
1998-99	LEN Cup	Quarterfinals	VK Primorac Kotor	(Greece) Patras	5-4	4-9
2000-01	LEN Cup Winners' Cup	Round 1	PVK Jadran Herceg Novi	(North Macedonia) Mladost Skopje	10-9	
2000-01	LEN Cup Winners' Cup	Round 1	PVK Jadran Herceg Novi	(Austria) Salzburg	17-1	
2000-01	LEN Cup Winners' Cup	Round 1	PVK Jadran Herceg Novi	(Greece) Ethnikos Piraeus	9-8	
2000-01	LEN Cup Winners' Cup	Quarterfinals	PVK Jadran Herceg Novi	(Italy) Florentia	8-4	3-9
2000-01	LEN Cup	Round 1	VK Budva	(Russia) CSKA Moscow	6-9	
2000-01	LEN Cup	Round 1	VK Budva	(Germany) Cannstatt	4-5	
2001-02	LEN Cup Winners' Cup	Round 1	PVK Jadran Herceg Novi	(Slovenia) Olimpija Ljubljana	13-3	
2001-02	LEN Cup Winners' Cup	Round 1	PVK Jadran Herceg Novi	(Turkey) Istanbul Yuzme	8-4	
2001-02	LEN Cup Winners' Cup	Round 1	PVK Jadran Herceg Novi	(Italy) Florentia	3-7	
2001-02	LEN Cup Winners' Cup	Quarterfinals	PVK Jadran Herceg Novi	(Spain) Barcelona	9-5	2-4
2001-02	LEN Cup Winners' Cup	Semifinals	PVK Jadran Herceg Novi	(Croatia) Mladost Zagreb	7-5	2-5
2001-02	LEN Cup	Group C	VK Primorac Kotor	(Netherlands) Hilversum	12-4	
2001-02	LEN Cup	Group C	VK Primorac Kotor	(France) Marseille	10-5	
2001-02	LEN Cup	Group C	VK Primorac Kotor	(Greece) Panathinaikos	4-6	
2002-03	LEN Cup Winners' Cup	Group B	PVK Jadran Herceg Novi	(Romania) Dinamo București	9-2	
2002-03	LEN Cup Winners' Cup	Group B	PVK Jadran Herceg Novi	(Netherlands) Hilversum	5-3	
2002-03	LEN Cup Winners' Cup	Group B	PVK Jadran Herceg Novi	(Spain) Sabadell	5-7	
2002-03	LEN Cup Winners' Cup	Quarterfinals	PVK Jadran Herceg Novi	(Hungary) Vasas Budapest	4-5	5-5
2002-03	LEN Cup	Group A	VK Primorac Kotor	(France) Strasbourg	10-4	
2002-03	LEN Cup	Group A	VK Primorac Kotor	(Croatia) Mornar Split	5-4	
2002-03	LEN Cup	Group A	VK Primorac Kotor	(Germany) Hannover	12-4	
2002-03	LEN Cup	Quarterfinals	VK Primorac Kotor	(Greece) Ethnikos Piraeus	3-5	8-7
2003-04	LEN Euroleague	Group D	PVK Jadran Herceg Novi	(Russia) Spartak Volgograd	11-8	8-8
2003-04	LEN Euroleague	Group D	PVK Jadran Herceg Novi	(Hungary) Honvéd Budapest	6-5	6-6
2003-04	LEN Euroleague	Group D	PVK Jadran Herceg Novi	(Croatia) Jug Dubrovnik	5-6	10-9
2003-04	LEN Euroleague	Quarterfinals	PVK Jadran Herceg Novi	(Spain) Barceloneta	10-4	7-7
2003-04	LEN Euroleague	Semifinals	PVK Jadran Herceg Novi	(Russia) Šturm Ruza	5-3	
2003-04	LEN Euroleague	FINAL	PVK Jadran Herceg Novi	(Hungary) Honvéd Budapest	6-7	
2003-04	LEN Euroleague	Qualifiers	VK Primorac Kotor	(Ukraine) Illichivets Mariupol	14-4	
2003-04	LEN Euroleague	Qualifiers	VK Primorac Kotor	(Netherlands) Alphen	13-11	
2003-04	LEN Euroleague	Qualifiers	VK Primorac Kotor	(Germany) Duisburg	14-6	
2003-04	LEN Euroleague	Qualifiers	VK Primorac Kotor	(Croatia) Primorje Rijeka	15-10	
2003-04	LEN Euroleague	Qualifiers	VK Primorac Kotor	(Greece) Ethnikos Piraeus	13-11	
2003-04	LEN Euroleague	Group C	VK Primorac Kotor	(Hungary) Budapesti VSC	8-1	9-8
2003-04	LEN Euroleague	Group C	VK Primorac Kotor	(France) Olympic Nice	5-6	7-7
2003-04	LEN Euroleague	Group C	VK Primorac Kotor	(Croatia) Mladost Zagreb	9-6	6-9
2003-04	LEN Euroleague	Quarterfinals	VK Primorac Kotor	(Russia) Šturm Ruza	7-6	6-8
2003-04	LEN Cup	Round 1	VK Budva	(Portugal) Salgueiros	22-4	
2003-04	LEN Cup	Round 1	VK Budva	(Denmark) Odense	9-5	
2003-04	LEN Cup	Round 1	VK Budva	(Croatia) Mornar Split	5-10	
2003-04	LEN Cup	Quarterfinals	VK Budva	(Croatia) Jadran Split	6-5	1-8
2004-05	LEN Euroleague	Group B	PVK Jadran Herceg Novi	(Spain) Barceloneta	8-5	7-5
2004-05	LEN Euroleague	Group B	PVK Jadran Herceg Novi	(Italy) Pro Recco	7-7	8-9
2004-05	LEN Euroleague	Group B	PVK Jadran Herceg Novi	(Croatia) Mladost Zagreb	13-6	6-8
2004-05	LEN Euroleague	Quarterfinals	PVK Jadran Herceg Novi	(Croatia) Jug Dubrovnik	8-8	8-9
2004-05	LEN Euroleague	Qualifiers	VK Primorac Kotor	(Israel) ASA Tel Aviv	18-3	
2004-05	LEN Euroleague	Qualifiers	VK Primorac Kotor	(Poland) Pocztowiec Łódź	9-7	
2004-05	LEN Euroleague	Qualifiers	VK Primorac Kotor	(Ukraine) Illichivets Mariupol	13-3	
2004-05	LEN Euroleague	Qualifiers	VK Primorac Kotor	(Italy) Pro Recco	3-9	
2004-05	LEN Euroleague	Round 1	VK Primorac Kotor	(Hungary) Vasas Budapest	8-9	
2004-05	LEN Euroleague	Round 1	VK Primorac Kotor	(Russia) CSKA Moscow	11-5	
2004-05	LEN Euroleague	Round 1	VK Primorac Kotor	(Italy) Brescia	8-10	
2004-05	LEN Euroleague	Round 1	VK Primorac Kotor	(Austria) Tirol Innsbruck	6-2	
2004-05	LEN Euroleague	Round 1	VK Primorac Kotor	(France) Marseille	7-6	
2005-06	LEN Euroleague	Group D	PVK Jadran Herceg Novi	(Russia) Šturm Ruza	12-7	10-11
2005-06	LEN Euroleague	Group D	PVK Jadran Herceg Novi	(Italy) Pro Recco	11-10	3-11
2005-06	LEN Euroleague	Group D	PVK Jadran Herceg Novi	(Spain) Barceloneta	9-7	9-11
2005-06	LEN Euroleague	Quarterfinals	PVK Jadran Herceg Novi	(Italy) Posillipo Naples	5-7	13-14
2005-06	LEN Euroleague	Qualifiers	VK Primorac Kotor	(Switzerland) Schaffhausen	19-7	
2005-06	LEN Euroleague	Qualifiers	VK Primorac Kotor	(Ukraine) Illichivets Mariupol	13-8	
2005-06	LEN Euroleague	Qualifiers	VK Primorac Kotor	(Germany) Duisburg	11-7	
2005-06	LEN Euroleague	Qualifiers	VK Primorac Kotor	(Greece) Ethnikos Piraeus	8-9	
2005-06	LEN Euroleague	Round 1	VK Primorac Kotor	(Hungary) Vasas Budapest	7-9	
2005-06	LEN Euroleague	Round 1	VK Primorac Kotor	(Spain) Barceloneta	9-12	
2005-06	LEN Euroleague	Round 1	VK Primorac Kotor	(Croatia) Jadran Split	7-12	
2005-06	LEN Cup	Group L	VK Primorac Kotor	(Poland) Pocztowiec Łódź	12-7	
2005-06	LEN Cup	Group L	VK Primorac Kotor	(Greece) Patras	11-7	
2005-06	LEN Cup	Group L	VK Primorac Kotor	(France) Aix-les-Bains	11-6	
2005-06	LEN Cup	Round of 16	VK Primorac Kotor	(Greece) Panionios	11-8	7-13
2006-07	LEN Euroleague	Round 1	PVK Jadran Herceg Novi	(Slovenia) Triglav Kranj	13-6	
2006-07	LEN Euroleague	Round 1	PVK Jadran Herceg Novi	(Spain) Barcelona	9-9	
2006-07	LEN Euroleague	Round 1	PVK Jadran Herceg Novi	(Greece) Panionios	11-12	
2006-07	LEN Euroleague	Round 1	PVK Jadran Herceg Novi	(France) Montpellier	11-5	
2006-07	LEN Euroleague	Round 1	PVK Jadran Herceg Novi	(Netherlands) Polar Bears Ede	14-4	
2006-07	LEN Cup	Group I	PVK Jadran Herceg Novi	(Greece) Chania	17-5	
2006-07	LEN Cup	Group I	PVK Jadran Herceg Novi	(Czech Republic) Strakonice	21-3	
2006-07	LEN Cup	Group I	PVK Jadran Herceg Novi	(Spain) Mataró	9-10	
2006-07	LEN Cup	Quarterfinals	PVK Jadran Herceg Novi	(Russia) Dynamo Moscow	7-7	8-10
2006-07	LEN Euroleague	Qualifiers	VK Primorac Kotor	(Belarus) Druzhba Gomel	18-6	
2006-07	LEN Euroleague	Qualifiers	VK Primorac Kotor	(Turkey) Adalar Istanbul	11-4	
2006-07	LEN Euroleague	Qualifiers	VK Primorac Kotor	(Ukraine) Illichivets Mariupol	16-7	
2006-07	LEN Euroleague	Qualifiers	VK Primorac Kotor	(Netherlands) Zian	13-4	
2006-07	LEN Euroleague	Qualifiers	VK Primorac Kotor	(Poland) Pocztowiec Łódź	14-7	
2006-07	LEN Euroleague	Qualifiers	VK Primorac Kotor	(France) Montpellier	9-9	
2006-07	LEN Euroleague	Round 1	VK Primorac Kotor	(Germany) Spandau 04	9-10	
2006-07	LEN Euroleague	Round 1	VK Primorac Kotor	(Romania) Oradea	11-9	
2006-07	LEN Euroleague	Round 1	VK Primorac Kotor	(Croatia) Mladost Zagreb	7-12	
2006-07	LEN Euroleague	Round 1	VK Primorac Kotor	(Russia) Dynamo Moscow	11-15	
2006-07	LEN Euroleague	Round 1	VK Primorac Kotor	(Greece) Olympiakos	3-13	
2006-07	LEN Cup	Group B	VK Budva	(Greece) Chania	9-8	
2006-07	LEN Cup	Group B	VK Budva	(Turkey) İzmir	24-2	
2006-07	LEN Cup	Group B	VK Budva	(England) City of Manchester	17-2	
2006-07	LEN Cup	Group B	VK Budva	(Netherlands) Barendrecht	14-7	
2006-07	LEN Cup	Group B	VK Budva	(Hungary) Szeged	8-12	
2006-07	LEN Cup	Stage 2 / Group K	VK Budva	(Ukraine) Illichivets Mariupol	8-3	
2006-07	LEN Cup	Stage 2 / Group K	VK Budva	(France) Aix-les-Bains	18-7	
2006-07	LEN Cup	Stage 2 / Group K	VK Budva	(Switzerland) Horgen	16-4	
2006-07	LEN Cup	Round of 16	VK Budva	(Germany) Spandau 04	12-10	13-14
2006-07	LEN Cup	Quarterfinals	VK Budva	(Italy) Sportiva Nervi	11-9	10-10
2006-07	LEN Cup	Semifinals	VK Budva	(Italy) Šibenik	12-12	11-12
2007-08	LEN Euroleague	Qualifiers	VK Primorac Kotor	(Russia) Spartak Volgograd	11-8	
2007-08	LEN Euroleague	Qualifiers	VK Primorac Kotor	(Turkey) Istanbul Yuzme	18-3	
2007-08	LEN Euroleague	Qualifiers	VK Primorac Kotor	(Netherlands) Eindhoven	15-5	
2007-08	LEN Euroleague	Qualifiers	VK Primorac Kotor	(Slovakia) Košice	15-3	
2007-08	LEN Euroleague	Qualifiers	VK Primorac Kotor	(Switzerland) Lugano	24-2	
2007-08	LEN Euroleague	Qualifiers	VK Primorac Kotor	(Greece) Chios	12-5	
2007-08	LEN Euroleague	Round 1	VK Primorac Kotor	(Serbia) Vojvodina Novi Sad	11-3	
2007-08	LEN Euroleague	Round 1	VK Primorac Kotor	(Spain) Terrassa	10-8	
2007-08	LEN Euroleague	Round 1	VK Primorac Kotor	(Germany) Spandau 04	10-8	
2007-08	LEN Euroleague	Round 1	VK Primorac Kotor	(Greece) Ethnikos Piraeus	10-8	
2007-08	LEN Euroleague	Round 1	VK Primorac Kotor	(Slovenia) Olimpija Ljubljana	13-2	
2007-08	LEN Euroleague	Group B	VK Primorac Kotor	(Russia) Spartak Volgograd	13-8	6-6
2007-08	LEN Euroleague	Group B	VK Primorac Kotor	(France) Marseille	12-9	5-9
2007-08	LEN Euroleague	Group B	VK Primorac Kotor	(Italy) Pro Recco	10-9	6-14
2007-08	LEN Euroleague	Quarterfinals	VK Primorac Kotor	(Hungary) Vasas Budapest	6-8	7-6
2007-08	LEN Euroleague	Qualifiers	PVK Jadran Herceg Novi	(Germany) Duisburg	17-8	
2007-08	LEN Euroleague	Qualifiers	PVK Jadran Herceg Novi	(Austria) Tirol Innsbruck	21-5	
2007-08	LEN Euroleague	Qualifiers	PVK Jadran Herceg Novi	(Poland) Pocztowiec Łódź	16-6	
2007-08	LEN Euroleague	Qualifiers	PVK Jadran Herceg Novi	(France) Olympic Nice	13-6	
2007-08	LEN Euroleague	Qualifiers	PVK Jadran Herceg Novi	(Serbia) Vojvodina Novi Sad	15-5	
2007-08	LEN Euroleague	Round 1	PVK Jadran Herceg Novi	(France) Montpellier	17-6	
2007-08	LEN Euroleague	Round 1	PVK Jadran Herceg Novi	(Slovakia) Košice	15-4	
2007-08	LEN Euroleague	Round 1	PVK Jadran Herceg Novi	(Hungary) Eger	5-5	
2007-08	LEN Euroleague	Round 1	PVK Jadran Herceg Novi	(Spain) Sabadell	11-6	
2007-08	LEN Euroleague	Round 1	PVK Jadran Herceg Novi	(Italy) Posillipo Naples	13-7	
2007-08	LEN Euroleague	Group A	PVK Jadran Herceg Novi	(Croatia) Mladost Zagreb	7-11	9-8
2007-08	LEN Euroleague	Group A	PVK Jadran Herceg Novi	(Russia) Sintez Kazan	7-8	8-15
2007-08	LEN Euroleague	Group A	PVK Jadran Herceg Novi	(Greece) Olympiakos	8-10	6-14
2007-08	LEN Cup	Group F	VK Budva	(Denmark) Odense	19-4	
2007-08	LEN Cup	Group F	VK Budva	(Netherlands) Barendrecht	15-5	
2007-08	LEN Cup	Group F	VK Budva	(Germany) Esslingen	20-9	
2007-08	LEN Cup	Stage 2 / Group N	VK Budva	(Spain) Terrassa	14-8	
2007-08	LEN Cup	Stage 2 / Group N	VK Budva	(Greece) Vouliagmeni	14-4	
2007-08	LEN Cup	Stage 2 / Group N	VK Budva	(Austria) Tirol Innsbruck	23-2	
2007-08	LEN Cup	Round of 16	VK Budva	(Russia) CSKA Moscow	14-5	11-4
2007-08	LEN Cup	Quarterfinals	VK Budva	(Italy) Savona	8-7	11-11
2007-08	LEN Cup	Semifinals	VK Budva	(Hungary) Eger	9-9	9-11
2007-08	LEN Cup	Group B	PVK Val Prčanj	(Portugal) Porto	25-6	
2007-08	LEN Cup	Group B	PVK Val Prčanj	(Turkey) ODTÜ Ankara	19-7	
2007-08	LEN Cup	Group B	PVK Val Prčanj	(Germany) SG Neukölln Berlin	8-9	
2007-08	LEN Cup	Stage 2 / Group P	PVK Val Prčanj	(Turkey) Istanbul Yuzme	9-9	
2007-08	LEN Cup	Stage 2 / Group P	PVK Val Prčanj	(Russia) Šturm Ruza	5-26	
2007-08	LEN Cup	Stage 2 / Group P	PVK Val Prčanj	(Spain) Barcelona	9-12	
2008-09	LEN Euroleague	Group C	VK Primorac Kotor	(Croatia) Šibenik	13-6	17-7
2008-09	LEN Euroleague	Group C	VK Primorac Kotor	(Italy) Brescia	15-7	13-9
2008-09	LEN Euroleague	Group C	VK Primorac Kotor	(Greece) Olympiakos	7-9	8-9
2008-09	LEN Euroleague	Quarterfinals	VK Primorac Kotor	(Montenegro) PVK Jadran Herceg Novi	12-12	9-8
2008-09	LEN Euroleague	Semifinals	VK Primorac Kotor	(Croatia) Mladost Zagreb	11-9	
2008-09	LEN Euroleague	FINAL	VK Primorac Kotor	(Italy) Pro Recco	9-8	
2008-09	LEN Euroleague	Round 1	PVK Jadran Herceg Novi	(Ukraine) Illichivets Mariupol	15-6	
2008-09	LEN Euroleague	Round 1	PVK Jadran Herceg Novi	(Russia) Spartak Volgograd	11-7	
2008-09	LEN Euroleague	Round 1	PVK Jadran Herceg Novi	(Netherlands) Eindhoven	20-5	
2008-09	LEN Euroleague	Round 1	PVK Jadran Herceg Novi	(Greece) Ethnikos Piraeus	14-4	
2008-09	LEN Euroleague	Round 1	PVK Jadran Herceg Novi	(Hungary) Honvéd Budapest	15-8	
2008-09	LEN Euroleague	Group B	PVK Jadran Herceg Novi	(Spain) Barceloneta	7-6	11-11
2008-09	LEN Euroleague	Group B	PVK Jadran Herceg Novi	(Croatia) Mladost Zagreb	11-4	10-10
2008-09	LEN Euroleague	Group B	PVK Jadran Herceg Novi	(Montenegro) VK Budva	13-8	10-14
2008-09	LEN Euroleague	Quarterfinals	PVK Jadran Herceg Novi	(Montenegro) VK Primorac Kotor	8-9	12-12
2008-09	LEN Euroleague	Qualifiers	VK Budva	(England) Rotherham Metro	24-5	
2008-09	LEN Euroleague	Qualifiers	VK Budva	(Hungary) Honvéd Budapest	7-9	
2008-09	LEN Euroleague	Qualifiers	VK Budva	(Netherlands) Donk	19-6	
2008-09	LEN Euroleague	Qualifiers	VK Budva	(Germany) Spandau 04	11-4	
2008-09	LEN Euroleague	Qualifiers	VK Budva	(Slovenia) Koper	15-7	
2008-09	LEN Euroleague	Round 1	VK Budva	(France) Olympic Nice	18-6	
2008-09	LEN Euroleague	Round 1	VK Budva	(Russia) Sintez Kazan	11-10	
2008-09	LEN Euroleague	Round 1	VK Budva	(Croatia) Jug Dubrovnik	8-14	
2008-09	LEN Euroleague	Round 1	VK Budva	(Germany) Duisburg	15-10	
2008-09	LEN Euroleague	Round 1	VK Budva	(Italy) Posillipo Naples	14-11	
2008-09	LEN Euroleague	Group B	VK Budva	(Croatia) Mladost Zagreb	6-6	6-7
2008-09	LEN Euroleague	Group B	VK Budva	(Spain) Barceloneta	13-10	6-10
2008-09	LEN Euroleague	Group B	VK Budva	(Montenegro) PVK Jadran Herceg Novi	14-10	8-13
2008-09	LEN Cup	Group F	VA Cattaro Kotor	(Germany) Hannover	17-7	
2008-09	LEN Cup	Group F	VA Cattaro Kotor	(Portugal) Paredes	30-0	
2008-09	LEN Cup	Stage 2 / Group I	VA Cattaro Kotor	(Russia) Spartak Volgograd	13-4	
2008-09	LEN Cup	Stage 2 / Group I	VA Cattaro Kotor	(Netherlands) Donk	17-5	
2008-09	LEN Cup	Stage 2 / Group I	VA Cattaro Kotor	(Romania) Oradea	10-7	
2008-09	LEN Cup	Round of 16	VA Cattaro Kotor	(Hungary) Szeged	5-4	5-8
2008-09	LEN Cup	Group E	PVK Val Prčanj	(Serbia) Beograd	11-11	
2008-09	LEN Cup	Group E	PVK Val Prčanj	(England) Bristol	16-3	
2008-09	LEN Cup	Stage 2 / Group K	PVK Val Prčanj	(Greece) Chios	9-16	
2008-09	LEN Cup	Stage 2 / Group K	PVK Val Prčanj	(Hungary) Honvéd Budapest	9-19	
2008-09	LEN Cup	Stage 2 / Group K	PVK Val Prčanj	(Portugal) Portinado	17-10	
2009-10	LEN Euroleague	Round 1	VK Primorac Kotor	(France) Marseille	16-6	
2009-10	LEN Euroleague	Round 1	VK Primorac Kotor	(Russia) Sintez Kazan	16-8	
2009-10	LEN Euroleague	Round 1	VK Primorac Kotor	(Italy) Posillipo Naples	9-5	
2009-10	LEN Euroleague	Group B	VK Primorac Kotor	(Greece) Panionios	10-6	12-11
2009-10	LEN Euroleague	Group B	VK Primorac Kotor	(Hungary) Vasas Budapest	9-7	8-5
2009-10	LEN Euroleague	Group B	VK Primorac Kotor	(Croatia) Jug Dubrovnik	14-10	9-9
2009-10	LEN Euroleague	Quarterfinals	VK Primorac Kotor	(Montenegro) PVK Jadran Herceg Novi	10-6	14-9
2009-10	LEN Euroleague	Semifinals	VK Primorac Kotor	(Croatia) Jug Dubrovnik	11-10	
2009-10	LEN Euroleague	FINAL	VK Primorac Kotor	(Italy) Pro Recco	3-9	
2009-10	LEN Euroleague	Group A	PVK Jadran Herceg Novi	(Spain) Barceloneta	8-9	9-11
2009-10	LEN Euroleague	Group A	PVK Jadran Herceg Novi	(Croatia) Mladost Zagreb	7-5	9-6
2009-10	LEN Euroleague	Group A	PVK Jadran Herceg Novi	(Serbia) Vojvodina Novi Sad	13-6	9-5
2009-10	LEN Euroleague	Quarterfinals	PVK Jadran Herceg Novi	(Montenegro) VK Primorac Kotor	9-14	6-10
2009-10	LEN Euroleague	Round 1	VK Budva	(Slovakia) Košice	8-3	
2009-10	LEN Euroleague	Round 1	VK Budva	(Germany) Spandau 04	7-5	
2009-10	LEN Euroleague	Round 1	VK Budva	(Croatia) Mladost Zagreb	9-9	
2009-10	LEN Euroleague	Group C	VK Budva	(Slovakia) Partizan Belgrade	3-9	6-12
2009-10	LEN Euroleague	Group C	VK Budva	(Hungary) Honvéd Budapest	14-6	10-6
2009-10	LEN Euroleague	Group C	VK Budva	(Greece) Olympiakos	11-9	4-10
2009-10	LEN Euroleague	Quarterfinals	VK Budva	(Italy) Pro Recco	10-12	5-9
2009-10	LEN Cup	Group A	VA Cattaro Kotor	(Denmark) Odense	26-5	
2009-10	LEN Cup	Group A	VA Cattaro Kotor	(Hungary) Ferencváros Budapest	9-4	
2009-10	LEN Cup	Group A	VA Cattaro Kotor	(Romania) Dinamo București	16-8	
2009-10	LEN Cup	Group A	VA Cattaro Kotor	(France) Montpellier	18-8	
2009-10	LEN Cup	Group A	VA Cattaro Kotor	(Italy) Savona	10-11	
2009-10	LEN Cup	Stage 2 / Group F	VA Cattaro Kotor	(Turkey) Galatasaray	15-9	
2009-10	LEN Cup	Stage 2 / Group F	VA Cattaro Kotor	(Greece) Panathinaikos	13-10	
2009-10	LEN Cup	Stage 2 / Group F	VA Cattaro Kotor	(Italy) Brescia	10-9	
2009-10	LEN Cup	Round of 16	VA Cattaro Kotor	(Greece) Patras	10-5	4-8
2009-10	LEN Cup	Quarterfinals	VA Cattaro Kotor	(Croatia) Primorje Rijeka	8-4	7-9
2009-10	LEN Cup	Semifinals	VA Cattaro Kotor	(Germany) Spandau 04	8-4	6-6
2009-10	LEN Cup	FINAL	VA Cattaro Kotor	(Italy) Savona	8-5	7-9
2009-10	LEN Cup	Group C	PVK Val Prčanj	(Russia) Dynamo Moscow	7-17	
2009-10	LEN Cup	Group C	PVK Val Prčanj	(England) City of Manchester	7-4	
2009-10	LEN Cup	Group C	PVK Val Prčanj	(Hungary) Szeged	4-20	
2009-10	LEN Cup	Group C	PVK Val Prčanj	(Croatia) Jadran Split	5-15	
2009-10	LEN Cup	Group C	PVK Val Prčanj	(Portugal) Paredes	20-6	
2009-10	LEN Cup	Stage 2 / Group N	PVK Val Prčanj	(Austria) Tirol Innsbruck	22-6	
2009-10	LEN Cup	Stage 2 / Group N	PVK Val Prčanj	(Spain) Sabadell	6-20	
2009-10	LEN Cup	Stage 2 / Group N	PVK Val Prčanj	(Russia) Spartak Volgograd	5-15	
2010-11	LEN Euroleague	Qualifiers	VK Budva	(Netherlands) Schuurman	10-4	
2010-11	LEN Euroleague	Qualifiers	VK Budva	(France) Marseille	11-10	
2010-11	LEN Euroleague	Qualifiers	VK Budva	(Poland) Pocztowiec Łódź	20-3	
2010-11	LEN Euroleague	Qualifiers	VK Budva	(Russia) Šturm Ruza	14-11	
2010-11	LEN Euroleague	Round 1	VK Budva	(Spain) Barcelona	12-7	
2010-11	LEN Euroleague	Round 1	VK Budva	(Italy) Savona	8-7	
2010-11	LEN Euroleague	Round 1	VK Budva	(Greece) Vouliagmeni	9-8	
2010-11	LEN Euroleague	Group B	VK Budva	(Serbia) Vojvodina Novi Sad	9-7	9-6
2010-11	LEN Euroleague	Group B	VK Budva	(Italy) Pro Recco	5-6	7-12
2010-11	LEN Euroleague	Group B	VK Budva	(Russia) Spartak Volgograd	9-3	5-6
2010-11	LEN Euroleague	Stage 2 / Group B	VK Budva	(Croatia) Jug Dubrovnik	9-7	6-10
2010-11	LEN Euroleague	Stage 2 / Group B	VK Budva	(Slovakia) Partizan Belgrade	5-8	2-10
2010-11	LEN Euroleague	Stage 2 / Group B	VK Budva	(Montenegro) PVK Jadran Herceg Novi	6-5	9-8
2010-11	LEN Euroleague	Semifinals	VK Budva	(Italy) Pro Recco	4-9	
2010-11	LEN Euroleague	3rd Place Match	VK Budva	(Croatia) Mladost Zagreb	12-14	
2010-11	LEN Euroleague	Group A	PVK Jadran Herceg Novi	(Montenegro) VK Primorac Kotor	9-10	7-12
2010-11	LEN Euroleague	Group A	PVK Jadran Herceg Novi	(Hungary) Vasas Budapest	11-10	12-8
2010-11	LEN Euroleague	Group A	PVK Jadran Herceg Novi	(Hungary) Szeged	13-10	9-7
2010-11	LEN Euroleague	Stage 2 / Group B	PVK Jadran Herceg Novi	(Slovakia) Partizan Belgrade	8-13	8-14
2010-11	LEN Euroleague	Stage 2 / Group B	PVK Jadran Herceg Novi	(Croatia) Jug Dubrovnik	7-7	6-13
2010-11	LEN Euroleague	Stage 2 / Group B	PVK Jadran Herceg Novi	(Montenegro) VK Budva	8-9	5-6
2010-11	LEN Euroleague	Round 1	VK Primorac Kotor	(Greece) Panionios	12-4	
2010-11	LEN Euroleague	Round 1	VK Primorac Kotor	(Croatia) Primorje Rijeka	9-12	
2010-11	LEN Euroleague	Round 1	VK Primorac Kotor	(Slovakia) Košice	9-3	
2010-11	LEN Euroleague	Group A	VK Primorac Kotor	(Montenegro) PVK Jadran Herceg Novi	12-7	10-9
2010-11	LEN Euroleague	Group A	VK Primorac Kotor	(Hungary) Szeged	9-9	13-7
2010-11	LEN Euroleague	Group A	VK Primorac Kotor	(Hungary) Vasas Budapest	8-9	6-7
2010-11	LEN Cup	Group B	VA Cattaro Kotor	(Germany) Weiden	12-7	
2010-11	LEN Cup	Group B	VA Cattaro Kotor	(Serbia) ŽAK Kikinda	9-5	
2010-11	LEN Cup	Group B	VA Cattaro Kotor	(Ukraine) Illichivets Mariupol	15-10	
2010-11	LEN Cup	Group B	VA Cattaro Kotor	(France) Douai	8-10	
2010-11	LEN Cup	Stage 2 / Group E	VA Cattaro Kotor	(Georgia (country)) Ligamus Tbilisi	13-7	
2010-11	LEN Cup	Stage 2 / Group E	VA Cattaro Kotor	(Turkey) Istanbul Yuzme	8-8	
2010-11	LEN Cup	Stage 2 / Group E	VA Cattaro Kotor	(Greece) Panionios	6-17	
2010-11	LEN Cup	Round of 16	VA Cattaro Kotor	(Hungary) Ferencváros Budapest	6-4	5-11
2010-11	LEN Cup	Group D	PVK Val Prčanj	(Slovenia) Koper	4-16	
2010-11	LEN Cup	Group D	PVK Val Prčanj	(Greece) PAOK	5-15	
2010-11	LEN Cup	Group D	PVK Val Prčanj	(Italy) Florentia	9-13	
2010-11	LEN Cup	Group D	PVK Val Prčanj	(Turkey) Orta Doğu Ankara	16-7	
2010-11	LEN Cup	Stage 2 / Group M	PVK Val Prčanj	(Turkey) Galatasaray	6-9	
2010-11	LEN Cup	Stage 2 / Group M	PVK Val Prčanj	(Russia) Sintez Kazan	2-18	
2010-11	LEN Cup	Stage 2 / Group M	PVK Val Prčanj	(France) Douai	10-13	
2011-12	LEN Euroleague	Group A	VK Budva	(Croatia) Primorje Rijeka	11-10	8-12
2011-12	LEN Euroleague	Group A	VK Budva	(Greece) Vouliagmeni	8-9	11-10
2011-12	LEN Euroleague	Group A	VK Budva	(Greece) Olympiakos	8-5	2-11
2011-12	LEN Euroleague	Quarterfinals	VK Budva	(Italy) Pro Recco	5-13	6-19
2011-12	LEN Euroleague	Round 1	PVK Jadran Herceg Novi	(Greece) Vouliagmeni	5-12	
2011-12	LEN Euroleague	Round 1	PVK Jadran Herceg Novi	(Romania) Oradea	12-10	
2011-12	LEN Euroleague	Round 1	PVK Jadran Herceg Novi	(Italy) Posillipo Naples	7-4	
2011-12	LEN Euroleague	Group D	PVK Jadran Herceg Novi	(France) Marseille	12-7	13-10
2011-12	LEN Euroleague	Group D	PVK Jadran Herceg Novi	(Italy) Pro Recco	9-14	8-10
2011-12	LEN Euroleague	Group D	PVK Jadran Herceg Novi	(Russia) Spartak Volgograd	13-10	11-11
2011-12	LEN Euroleague	Quarterfinals	PVK Jadran Herceg Novi	(Croatia) Primorje Rijeka	11-11	11-12
2011-12	LEN Euroleague	Qualifiers	VK Primorac Kotor	(France) Montpellier	14-8	
2011-12	LEN Euroleague	Qualifiers	VK Primorac Kotor	(Greece) Panathinaikos	8-11	
2011-12	LEN Euroleague	Qualifiers	VK Primorac Kotor	(Italy) Posillipo Naples	6-12	
2011-12	LEN Euroleague	Qualifiers	VK Primorac Kotor	(Hungary) Szeged	9-11	
2011-12	LEN Euroleague	Qualifiers	VK Primorac Kotor	(Ukraine) Kharkiv	12-8	
2011-12	LEN Euroleague	Round 1	VK Primorac Kotor	(Serbia) Vojvodina Novi Sad	5-14	
2011-12	LEN Euroleague	Round 1	VK Primorac Kotor	(France) Marseille	7-8	
2011-12	LEN Euroleague	Round 1	VK Primorac Kotor	(Germany) Duisburg	6-13	
2011-12	LEN Cup	Stage 2 / Group F	VK Primorac Kotor	(Greece) Panionios	6-11	
2011-12	LEN Cup	Stage 2 / Group F	VK Primorac Kotor	(Russia) Dynamo Moscow	8-9	
2011-12	LEN Cup	Stage 2 / Group F	VK Primorac Kotor	(Turkey) Heybeliada Istanbul	10-11	
2013-14	LEN Champions League	Qualifiers	VK Budva	(Serbia) Radnički Kragujevac	4-17	
2013-14	LEN Champions League	Qualifiers	VK Budva	(Russia) Spartak Volgograd	7-10	
2013-14	LEN Champions League	Qualifiers	VK Budva	(France) Montpellier	13-12	
2013-14	LEN Champions League	Qualifiers	VK Budva	(Romania) Oradea	5-12	
2013-14	LEN Champions League	Qualifiers	VK Budva	(Germany) Hannover	14-13	
2013-14	LEN Champions League	Round 1	VK Budva	(Serbia) Radnički Kragujevac	3-16	
2013-14	LEN Champions League	Round 1	VK Budva	(Croatia) Mladost Zagreb	6-12	
2013-14	LEN Champions League	Round 1	VK Budva	(Italy) Pro Recco	4-17	
2013-14	LEN Cup	Group D	PVK Jadran Herceg Novi	(France) Marseille	7-7	
2013-14	LEN Cup	Group D	PVK Jadran Herceg Novi	(Russia) Šturm Ruza	33-4	
2013-14	LEN Cup	Group D	PVK Jadran Herceg Novi	(Croatia) Mladost Zagreb	6-9	
2013-14	LEN Cup	Quarterfinals	PVK Jadran Herceg Novi	(Italy) Acquachiara	6-11	10-8
2013-14	LEN Cup	Group C	VK Primorac Kotor	(Netherlands) Utrecht	9-5	
2013-14	LEN Cup	Group C	VK Primorac Kotor	(Italy) Acquachiara	12-13	
2013-14	LEN Cup	Group C	VK Primorac Kotor	(France) Olympic Nice	9-8	
2013-14	LEN Cup	Group C	VK Primorac Kotor	(Serbia) Vojvodina Novi Sad	11-6	
2013-14	LEN Cup	Quarterfinals	VK Primorac Kotor	(Croatia) Mladost Zagreb	3-10	4-14
2014-15	LEN Champions League	Qualifiers	PVK Jadran Herceg Novi	(Romania) Oradea	6-6	
2014-15	LEN Champions League	Qualifiers	PVK Jadran Herceg Novi	(France) Montpellier	9-7	
2014-15	LEN Champions League	Qualifiers	PVK Jadran Herceg Novi	(Russia) Sintez Kazan	6-8	
2014-15	LEN Champions League	Qualifiers	PVK Jadran Herceg Novi	(Croatia) Mladost Zagreb	5-13	
2014-15	LEN Champions League	Qualifiers	PVK Jadran Herceg Novi	(Germany) Hannover	14-6	
2014-15	LEN Champions League	Round 1	PVK Jadran Herceg Novi	(Croatia) Mladost Zagreb	7-7	
2014-15	LEN Champions League	Round 1	PVK Jadran Herceg Novi	(Croatia) Primorje Rijeka	4-11	
2014-15	LEN Champions League	Round 1	PVK Jadran Herceg Novi	(France) Marseille	9-6	
2014-15	LEN Cup	Group A	PVK Jadran Herceg Novi	(Italy) Acquachiara	9-9	
2014-15	LEN Cup	Group A	PVK Jadran Herceg Novi	(Netherlands) Utrecht	14-3	
2014-15	LEN Cup	Group A	PVK Jadran Herceg Novi	(Russia) Sintez Kazan	7-11	
2014-15	LEN Cup	Group A	PVK Jadran Herceg Novi	(Greece) Vouliagmeni	6-6	
2014-15	LEN Cup	Group A	PVK Jadran Herceg Novi	(Germany) Esslingen	22-9	
2014-15	LEN Cup	Group B	VK Primorac Kotor	(Malta) Valletta	12-8	
2014-15	LEN Cup	Group B	VK Primorac Kotor	(Romania) Steaua București	6-8	
2014-15	LEN Cup	Group B	VK Primorac Kotor	(France) Montpellier	7-13	
2014-15	LEN Cup	Group B	VK Primorac Kotor	(Croatia) Mornar Split	5-18	
2015-16	LEN Champions League	Qualifiers	PVK Jadran Herceg Novi	(Croatia) Mladost Zagreb	7-5	
2015-16	LEN Champions League	Qualifiers	PVK Jadran Herceg Novi	(France) Montpellier	11-7	
2015-16	LEN Champions League	Qualifiers	PVK Jadran Herceg Novi	(Russia) Spartak Volgograd	11-13	
2015-16	LEN Champions League	Round 1	PVK Jadran Herceg Novi	(Spain) Sabadell	7-6	
2015-16	LEN Champions League	Round 1	PVK Jadran Herceg Novi	(Romania) Oradea	7-6	
2015-16	LEN Champions League	Round 1	PVK Jadran Herceg Novi	(Italy) Busto Arsizio	10-9	
2015-16	LEN Champions League	Playoffs	PVK Jadran Herceg Novi	(Italy) Brescia	14-6	8-12
2015-16	LEN Champions League	Group A	PVK Jadran Herceg Novi	(Croatia) Primorje Rijeka	9-11	7-13
2015-16	LEN Champions League	Group A	PVK Jadran Herceg Novi	(Hungary) Eger	11-11	8-7
2015-16	LEN Champions League	Group A	PVK Jadran Herceg Novi	(Spain) Barceloneta	5-6	10-15
2015-16	LEN Champions League	Group A	PVK Jadran Herceg Novi	(Greece) Olympiakos	6-13	4-10
2015-16	LEN Champions League	Group A	PVK Jadran Herceg Novi	(Germany) Spandau 04	9-9	9-9
2015-16	LEN Champions League	Qualifiers	VK Budva	(Malta) Valletta	9-5	
2015-16	LEN Champions League	Qualifiers	VK Budva	(Romania) Oradea	7-7	
2015-16	LEN Champions League	Qualifiers	VK Budva	(Italy) Busto Arsizio	6-11	
2015-16	LEN Champions League	Round 1	VK Budva	(Hungary) Szolnok	5-19	
2015-16	LEN Champions League	Round 1	VK Budva	(Germany) Hannover	6-12	
2015-16	LEN Champions League	Round 1	VK Budva	(Serbia) Radnički Kragujevac	7-8	
2015-16	LEN Cup	Group A	VK Primorac Kotor	(Italy) Acquachiara	6-15	
2015-16	LEN Cup	Group A	VK Primorac Kotor	(Hungary) Ferencváros Budapest	4-17	
2015-16	LEN Cup	Group A	VK Primorac Kotor	(France) Strasbourg	10-14	
2015-16	LEN Cup	Group A	VK Primorac Kotor	(Hungary) Szeged	3-14	
2015-16	LEN Cup	Group A	VK Primorac Kotor	(Croatia) Jadran Split	6-9	
2015-16	LEN Cup	Group A	VK Primorac Kotor	(Germany) Esslingen	9-13	
2016-17	LEN Champions League	Qualifiers	PVK Jadran Herceg Novi	(Romania) Steaua București	9-7	
2016-17	LEN Champions League	Qualifiers	PVK Jadran Herceg Novi	(Malta) Valletta	25-1	
2016-17	LEN Champions League	Qualifiers	PVK Jadran Herceg Novi	(Poland) Arkonia Szczecin	23-3	
2016-17	LEN Champions League	Round 1	PVK Jadran Herceg Novi	(Germany) Hannover	6-8	
2016-17	LEN Champions League	Round 1	PVK Jadran Herceg Novi	(Greece) Vouliagmeni	9-6	
2016-17	LEN Champions League	Round 1	PVK Jadran Herceg Novi	(Germany) Duisburg	12-4	
2016-17	LEN Champions League	Playoffs	PVK Jadran Herceg Novi	(Italy) Brescia	11-8	5-14
2016-17	LEN Euro Cup	Quarterfinals	PVK Jadran Herceg Novi	(Italy) Posillipo Naples	7-8	9-6
2016-17	LEN Euro Cup	Semifinals	PVK Jadran Herceg Novi	(Hungary) Ferencváros Budapest	12-11	4-6
2016-17	LEN Euro Cup	Qualifiers	VK Primorac Kotor	(Italy) Napoli	7-12	
2016-17	LEN Euro Cup	Qualifiers	VK Primorac Kotor	(Hungary) Budapesti VSC	7-8	
2016-17	LEN Euro Cup	Qualifiers	VK Primorac Kotor	(Slovakia) Košice	12-7	
2017-18	LEN Champions League	Qualifiers	PVK Jadran Herceg Novi	(Italy) Napoli	18-7	
2017-18	LEN Champions League	Qualifiers	PVK Jadran Herceg Novi	(France) Strasbourg	7-6	
2017-18	LEN Champions League	Qualifiers	PVK Jadran Herceg Novi	(Turkey) Enka	17-3	
2017-18	LEN Champions League	Round 1	PVK Jadran Herceg Novi	(Russia) Spartak Volgograd	5-7	
2017-18	LEN Champions League	Round 1	PVK Jadran Herceg Novi	(Croatia) Mladost Zagreb	12-7	
2017-18	LEN Champions League	Round 1	PVK Jadran Herceg Novi	(Germany) Duisburg	19-5	
2017-18	LEN Champions League	Playoffs	PVK Jadran Herceg Novi	(France) Marseille	9-7	7-6
2017-18	LEN Champions League	Group B	PVK Jadran Herceg Novi	(Italy) Pro Recco	5-15	5-10
2017-18	LEN Champions League	Group B	PVK Jadran Herceg Novi	(Hungary) Eger	4-4	4-8
2017-18	LEN Champions League	Group B	PVK Jadran Herceg Novi	(Hungary) Szolnok	6-14	10-13
2017-18	LEN Champions League	Group B	PVK Jadran Herceg Novi	(Germany) Spandau 04	11-5	13-13
2017-18	LEN Champions League	Group B	PVK Jadran Herceg Novi	(Romania) Steaua București	16-10	8-4
2017-18	LEN Champions League	Group B	PVK Jadran Herceg Novi	(Spain) Sabadell	7-8	10-8
2017-18	LEN Champions League	Group B	PVK Jadran Herceg Novi	(Netherlands) Alphen	15-7	14-7
2017-18	LEN Euro Cup	Qualifiers	VK Primorac Kotor	(Spain) Mataró	12-8	
2017-18	LEN Euro Cup	Qualifiers	VK Primorac Kotor	(Hungary) Miskolci VLC	6-14	
2017-18	LEN Euro Cup	Qualifiers	VK Primorac Kotor	(Slovakia) Košice	12-10	
2017-18	LEN Euro Cup	Qualifiers	VK Primorac Kotor	(Germany) White Sharks	14-7	
2017-18	LEN Euro Cup	Qualifiers	VK Primorac Kotor	(Russia) Šturm Ruza	9-9	
2017-18	LEN Euro Cup	Round 1	VK Primorac Kotor	(Hungary) Ferencváros Budapest	10-13	
2017-18	LEN Euro Cup	Round 1	VK Primorac Kotor	(Spain) Mataró	8-9	
2017-18	LEN Euro Cup	Round 1	VK Primorac Kotor	(Croatia) Jadran Split	9-17	

== Performances by clubs ==
During the overall history, five different Montenegrin clubs played in LEN competitions.

Team	Seasons	G	W	D	L
PVK Jadran Herceg Novi	18	190	94	25	71
VK Primorac Kotor	18	149	87	7	54
VK Budva	12	127	67	9	51
VA Cattaro Kotor	3	32	22	1	9
PVK Val Prčanj	4	26	8	2	16

As of the end of LEN competitions 2017–18 season.

== Opponents by countries ==
Below is the list of performances of Montenegrin clubs against opponents in LEN competitions by their countries (water polo federations).

Opponents' country	G	W	D	L
Austria	6	6	0	0
Belarus	1	1	0	0
Croatia	65	21	9	35
Czech Republic	1	1	0	0
Denmark	4	4	0	0
England	5	5	0	0
France	36	26	3	7
Georgia	1	1	0	0
Germany	36	22	4	10
Greece	51	24	2	25
Hungary	55	20	7	28
Israel	2	2	0	0
Italy	65	23	5	37
North Macedonia	1	1	0	0
Malta	3	3	0	0
Netherlands	17	17	0	0
Poland	6	6	0	0
Portugal	5	5	0	0
Romania	14	10	2	2
Russia	42	18	5	19
Serbia	19	8	1	10
Slovakia	8	8	0	0
Slovenia	5	4	0	1
Spain	33	14	3	16
Switzerland	3	3	0	0
Turkey	12	8	2	2
Ukraine	10	10	0	0

As of the end of LEN competitions 2017–18 season.

== See also ==
- Adriatic Water polo League
- Montenegrin First League of Water Polo
- Montenegrin Second League of Water Polo
- Montenegrin Water Polo Cup
