= List of Montenegrin records in swimming =

The Montenegrin records in swimming are the fastest ever performances of swimmers from Montenegro, which are recognised and ratified by the Water Polo and Swimming Federation of Montenegro.

All records were set in finals unless noted otherwise.

== Long Course (50 m) ==
=== Men ===
Event	Time		Name	Club	Date	Meet	Location	Ref
50 m freestyle	23.44		Miloš Milenković	VK Budva	11 July 2026	International Meeting "Srđan and Maksim"	Trebinje, Bosnia and Herzegovina	
100 m freestyle	50.47		Miloš Milenković	VK Budva	20 June 2026	Trebišnjica Cup	Trebinje, Bosnia and Herzegovina	
200 m freestyle	1:51.88		Miloš Milenković	VK Budva	7 June 2026	Montenegrin Championships	Nikšić, Montenegro	
400 m freestyle	4:08.36		Miloš Milenković	VK Budva	20 June 2026	Trebišnjica Cup	Trebinje, Bosnia and Herzegovina	
800 m freestyle	9:11.00		Antonije Kandić	PKORK	3 June 2023	-	Ravne na Koroškem, Slovenia	
1500 m freestyle	16:54.50		Danijel Kljaković	VK Primorac Kotor	24 July 1988	-	Rijeca, Yugoslavia	
50m backstroke	27.87		Matt Jaukovic	Serbia and Montenegro	10 May 2004	European Championships	Madrid, Spain	
50m backstroke	27.48	not ratified	Matt Jaukovic	-	20 May 2007	Telstra Grand Prix	Brisbane, Australia	
100m backstroke	57.85		Marko Karadžić	Nikšić	5 July 2025	Montenegro Open	Podgorica, Montenegro	
200m backstroke	2:06.07		Marko Karadžić	Nikšić	6 July 2025	Montenegro Open	Podgorica, Montenegro	
50m breaststroke	29.41		Stefan Pupović	PK Orka	7 November 2026	Trebinje Open	Trebinje, Bosnia and Herzegovina	
100m breaststroke	1:06.07 (Note: by official result source; 1:05.19 by plivanje.info, probably a typo)	h	Nikola Alikavazović	Montenegro	28 June 2025	European U23 Championships	Šamorín, Slovakia	
200m breaststroke	2:25.48		Nikola Alikavazović	Vojvodina	25 March 2025	Banja Luka Open	Banja Luka, Bosnia and Herzegovina	
50m butterfly	23.77	h	Miloš Milenković	Montenegro	28 May 2025	Games of the Small States of Europe	Andorra la Vella, Andorra	
50m butterfly	23.67	not ratified	Miloš Milenković	SC Flös	21 December 2024	Swiss Open	Sursee, Switzerland	
50m butterfly	23.62	not ratified	Matt Jaukovic	Sydney University	18 March 2009	Australian Championships	Sydney, Australia	
100m butterfly	52.91	h	Miloš Milenković	Montenegro	12 August 2026	European Championships	Paris, France	
100m butterfly	52.56	not ratified	Matt Jaukovic	Sydney University	20 March 2009	Australian Championships	Sydney, Australia	
200m butterfly	2:09.86		Miloš Milenković	VK Budva	6 June 2026	Montenegrin Championships	Nikšić, Montenegro	
200m individual medley	2:12.46		Ado Gargović	VK Budva	9 April 2021	Russian Championships	Kazan, Russia	
400m individual medley	5:01.20		Nikola Alikavazović	B.Rivijera	29 December 2024	Montenegrin Championships	Nikšić, Montenegro	
4×50m freestyle relay	1:44.42		Nikola Šuka; Boško Bismiljak; Ognjen Dimić; Ado Gargović	PVK Jadran	15 July 2018	-	Trebinje, Bosnia and Herzegovina	
4×50m freestyle relay	1:42.46	#	Miloš Milenković (23.64); Damjan Bajčetić (25.50); Nikanor Veselov (28.41); Timofej Strelchinin (24.91)	VK Budva	20 June 2026	Trebišnjica Cup	Trebinje, Bosnia and Herzegovina	
4×100m freestyle relay	3:38.36		Boško Radulović; Nikola Šuka; Aldemar Alikavazović; Ado Gargović	VK Budva	30 May 2019	-	Podgorica, Montenegro	
4×200m freestyle relay	8:27.06		Ado Gargović; Nikola Šuka; Antonije Kandić; Vasilije Andrić	VK Budva	30 May 2019	-	Podgorica, Montenegro	
4×50m medley relay	1:56.43		Miljan Malović (30.64); Vasilije Sekulović (33.06); Dado Jaganjac (26.63); Veljko Vučinić (26.10)	PVK Buducnost	7 November 2026	Trebinje Open	Trebinje, Bosnia and Herzegovina	
4×100m medley relay	4:14.45		Timofej Strelcinin (1:07.19); Aldemar Alikavazović (1:10.27); Miloš Milenković (58.49); Đule Adrović (58.50)	VK Budva	3 July 2021	-	Podgorica, Montenegro	

Legend: # – Record awaiting ratification by Water Polo and Swimming Federation of Montenegro; WR – World record; ER – European record; e – equalled existing record;
Records not set in finals: h – heat; sf – semifinal; r – relay 1st leg; rh – relay heat 1st leg; b – B final; † – en route to final mark; so – swim-off; tt – time trial

=== Women ===
Event	Time		Name	Club	Date	Meet	Location	Ref
50m freestyle	26.70	h	Jovana Kuljača	Montenegro	14 August 2026	European Championships	Paris, France	
100m freestyle	58.24		Milica Marković	-	22 April 2010	-	Rennes, France	
100m freestyle	58.06	not ratified	Katarina Milutinović	Montenegro	31 July 2015	-	Tbilisi, Georgia	
200m freestyle	2:07.53		Milica Marković	-	16 July 2010	-	Besancon, France	
400m freestyle	4:34.50		Darija Pop	PVK Jadran	5 July 2008	-	Koper, Slovenia	
800m freestyle	9:25.72		Darija Pop	PVK Jadran	13 July 2008	-	Dubrovnik, Croatia	
1500m freestyle	18:30.59		Darija Pop	PVK Jadran	19 November 2007	-	Kranj, Slovenia	
50m backstroke	30.81	=	Danijela Đikanović	-	16 April 2006	-	Skopje, North Macedonia	
50m backstroke	30.81	=	Jovana Kuljača	Crna Gora	6 March 2026	Serbia Open	Futog, Serbia	
100m backstroke	1:05.24		Jana Borović	PVK Jadran	2 May 2026	Vienna International Meet	Vienna, Austria	
100m backstroke	1:04.81	not ratified	Katarina Milutinović	Montenegro	18 May 2015	-	Volgograd, Russia	
200m backstroke	2:22.92		Jana Borović	Crna Gora	6 March 2026	Serbia Open	Futog, Serbia	
50m breaststroke	34.06		Marina Kuč	PVK Jadran	29 May 2009	-	Bellinzona, Italy	
100m breaststroke	1:12.52	h, †	Marina Kuč	Montenegro	13 August 2008	Olympic Games	Beijing, China	
200m breaststroke	2:31.24	h	Marina Kuč	Montenegro	13 August 2008	Olympic Games	Beijing, China	
50m butterfly	28.33		Danijela Đikanović	PVK Jadran	7 June 2003	-	Zagreb, Croatia	
100m butterfly	1:04.94		Ksenija Milutinović	VK Budva	24 July 2014	Russian National Swimming	Ruza, Russia	
200m butterfly	2:25.83		Darija Pop	PVK Jadran	11 July 2008	-	Dubrovnik, Croatia	
200m individual medley	2:27.50		Ksenija Milutinović	VK Budva	26 April 2014	-	Larissa, Greece	
400m individual medley	5:11.90		Ksenija Milutinović	VK Budva	18 March 2014	-	Obninsk, Russia	
4×50m freestyle relay	1:57.44			VK Budva	17 June 2012	-	Sarajevo, Bosnia and Herzegovina	
4×100m freestyle relay	4:14.60		Jana Borović (1:00.89); Katarina Đurašković (1:06.89); Anđela Đurašković (1:04.27); Jovana Kuljača (1:02.55)	PVK Jadran	13 December 2025	Montenegrin Championships	Nikšić, Montenegro	
4×200m freestyle relay	9:16.80			PVK Jadran	28 July 2001	-	Belgrade, Serbia	
4×50m medley relay	2:10.17			VK Budva	18 June 2016	-	Trebinje, Bosnia and Herzegovina	
4×100m medley relay	4:42.35		Jana Borović (1:07.20); Katarina Đurašković (1:20.63); Anđela Đurašković (1:12.34); Jovana Kuljača (1:02.18)	PVK Jadran	14 December 2025	Montenegrin Championships	Nikšić, Montenegro	

Legend: # – Record awaiting ratification by Water Polo and Swimming Federation of Montenegro; WR – World record; ER – European record; e – equalled existing record;
Records not set in finals: h – heat; sf – semifinal; r – relay 1st leg; rh – relay heat 1st leg; b – B final; † – en route to final mark; so – swim-off; tt – time trial

== Short Course (25 m) ==
=== Men ===
Event	Time		Name	Club	Date	Meet	Location	Ref
50m freestyle	22.62		Miloš Milenković	B. Rivijera	29 March 2025 (Note: by official result source; 30 March 2025 by plivanje.info, a typo)	VPSCG State Championships	Budva, Montenegro	
100m freestyle	48.92		Miloš Milenković	VK Budva	26 October 2026	Jadran Grand Prix	Split, Croatia	
200m freestyle	1:49.55		Miloš Milenković	VK Budva	17 December 2021 (Note: same date as former record; probably wrong entry)	-	Split, Croatia	
400m freestyle	3:59.93	h	Ado Gargovic	Montenegro	16 December 2021	World Championships	Abu Dhabi, United Arab Emirates	
800m freestyle	8:50.89		Antonije Kandić	VK Primorac Kotor	17 December 2021	-	Kranj, Slovenia	
1500m freestyle	16:29.84		Danijel Kljaković	VK Primorac Kotor	31 December 1998	-	Split, Croatia	
50 m backstroke	26.21		Miloš Milenković	VK Budva	15 March 2026	Montenegro Open	Budva, Montenegro	
100m backstroke	56.02		Matija Jauković	PVK Jadran	9 December 2004	-	Wien, Austria	
200m backstroke	2:06.86		Matija Jauković	PVK Jadran	8 November 2003	-	Zrenjanin, Serbia	
50m breaststroke	28.98		Nikola Alikavazović	B.Rivijera	30 March 2025	VPSCG State Championships	Budva, Montenegro	
100m breaststroke	1:02.83		Nikola Alikavazović	B.Rivijera	30 March 2025	VPSCG State Championships	Budva, Montenegro	
200m breaststroke	2:19.00		Nikola Alikavazović	B.Rivijera	29 March 2025 (Note: by official result source; 30 March 2025 by plivanje.info, a typo)	VPSCG State Championships	Budva, Montenegro	
50m butterfly	23.60	h	Miloš Milenković	Montenegro	2 December 2025	European Championships	Lublin, Poland	
100m butterfly	52.12		Miloš Milenković	VK Budva	8 November 2026	Mladost Meet	Zagreb, Croatia	
200m butterfly	2:04.15		Miloš Milenković	VK Budva	10 November 2024	-	Skopje, North Macedonia	
100m individual medley	58.35		Nikola Alikavazović	B.Rivijera	29 March 2025 (Note: by official result source; 30 March 2025 by plivanje.info, a typo)	VPSCG State Championships	Budva, Montenegro	
200m individual medley	2:08.04		Ado Gargovic	VK Budva	19 March 2022	VPSCG State Championships	Budva, Montenegro	
400m individual medley	4:40.08		Nikola Alikavazović	B.Rivijera	30 March 2025	VPSCG State Championships	Budva, Montenegro	
4×50m freestyle relay	1:39.15			VK Budva	23 November 2019	-	Herceg Novi, Montenegro	
4×100m freestyle relay	3:44.54			PVK Jadran	31 December 1990	-	Celje, Slovenia	
4×200m freestyle relay	8:24.13			PVK Jadran	20 February 1989	-	Zagreb, Yugoslavia	
4×50m medley relay	1:58.40			VK Budva	24 November 2019	-	Herceg Novi, Montenegro	
4×100m medley relay	4:12.27			PVK Jadran	31 December 1990	-	Celje, Slovenia	

Legend: # – Record awaiting ratification by Water Polo and Swimming Federation of Montenegro; WR – World record; ER – European record; e – equalled existing record;
Records not set in finals: h – heat; sf – semifinal; r – relay 1st leg; rh – relay heat 1st leg; b – B final; † – en route to final mark; so – swim-off; tt – time trial

=== Women ===
Event	Time	Name	Club	Date	Meet	Location	Ref
50 m freestyle	25.93	Jovana Kuljača	PVK Budva	14 March 2026	Montenegro Open	Budva, Montenegro	
100 m freestyle	57.51	Jovana Kuljača	PVK Budva	15 March 2026	Montenegro Open	Budva, Montenegro	
200 m freestyle	2:07.96	Anđela Antunović	-	26 November 2017	-	Novi Sad, Serbia	
400 m freestyle	4:26.37	Darija Pop	PVK Jadran	7 November 2008	-	Kikinda, Serbia	
800 m freestyle	9:09.68	Darija Pop	PVK Jadran	9 November 2008	-	Kikinda, Serbia	
1500 m freestyle	17:26.52	Darija Pop	PVK Jadran	9 November 2008	-	Kikinda, Serbia	
50m backstroke	28.70	Jana Borović	VK Budva	7 November 2026	Mladost Meet	Zagreb, Croatia	
100m backstroke	1:01.55	Jana Borović	VK Budva	8 November 2026	Mladost Meet	Zagreb, Croatia	
200m backstroke	2:21.49	Jana Borović	PVK Budva	29 November 2025	Skopje Open	Skopje, North Macedonia	
50m breaststroke	33.15	Marina Kuč	PVK Jadran	7 December 2006	-	Helsinki, Finland	
100m breaststroke	1:10.66	Marina Kuč	Montenegro	26 April 2009	-	Lancy, Switzerland	
200m breaststroke	2:29.79	Marina Kuč	PVK Jadran	4 November 2006	-	Wuppertal, Germany	
50m butterfly	28.29	Danijela Đikanović	PVK Jadran	5 March 2006	-	Novi Sad, Serbia	
100m butterfly	1:03.89	Danijela Đikanović	PVK Jadran	4 December 2005	-	Zrenjanin, Serbia	
200m butterfly	2:23.26	Darija Pop	PVK Jadran	30 November 2008	-	Vienna, Austria	
100m individual medley	1:06.13	Ksenija Milutinović	VK Budva	14 December 2014	-	Volgograd, Russia	
200m individual medley	2:23.10	Ksenija Milutinović	VK Budva	8 November 2013	-	Zrenjanin, Serbia	
400m individual medley	5:02.90	Darija Pop	PVK Jadran	7 November 2008	-	Kikinda, Serbia	
4×50m freestyle relay	1:50.37		Montenegro	10 November 2011	-	Zrenjanin, Serbia	
4×100m freestyle relay	4:14.96		PVK Jadran	20 February 1989	-	Zagreb, Yugoslavia	
4×200m freestyle relay	9:14.46		PVK Jadran	31 March 2001	-	Pančevo, Serbia	
4×50m medley relay	2:01.18		VK Budva	11 February 2023	-	Mostar, Bosnia and Herzegovina	
4×100m medley relay	4:32.69		PVK Jadran	27 March 2005	-	Novi Sad, Serbia	

Legend: # – Record awaiting ratification by Water Polo and Swimming Federation of Montenegro; WR – World record; ER – European record; e – equalled existing record;
Records not set in finals: h – heat; sf – semifinal; r – relay 1st leg; rh – relay heat 1st leg; b – B final; † – en route to final mark; so – swim-off; tt – time trial
