= Ivica Tucak =

Croatian water polo player and coach

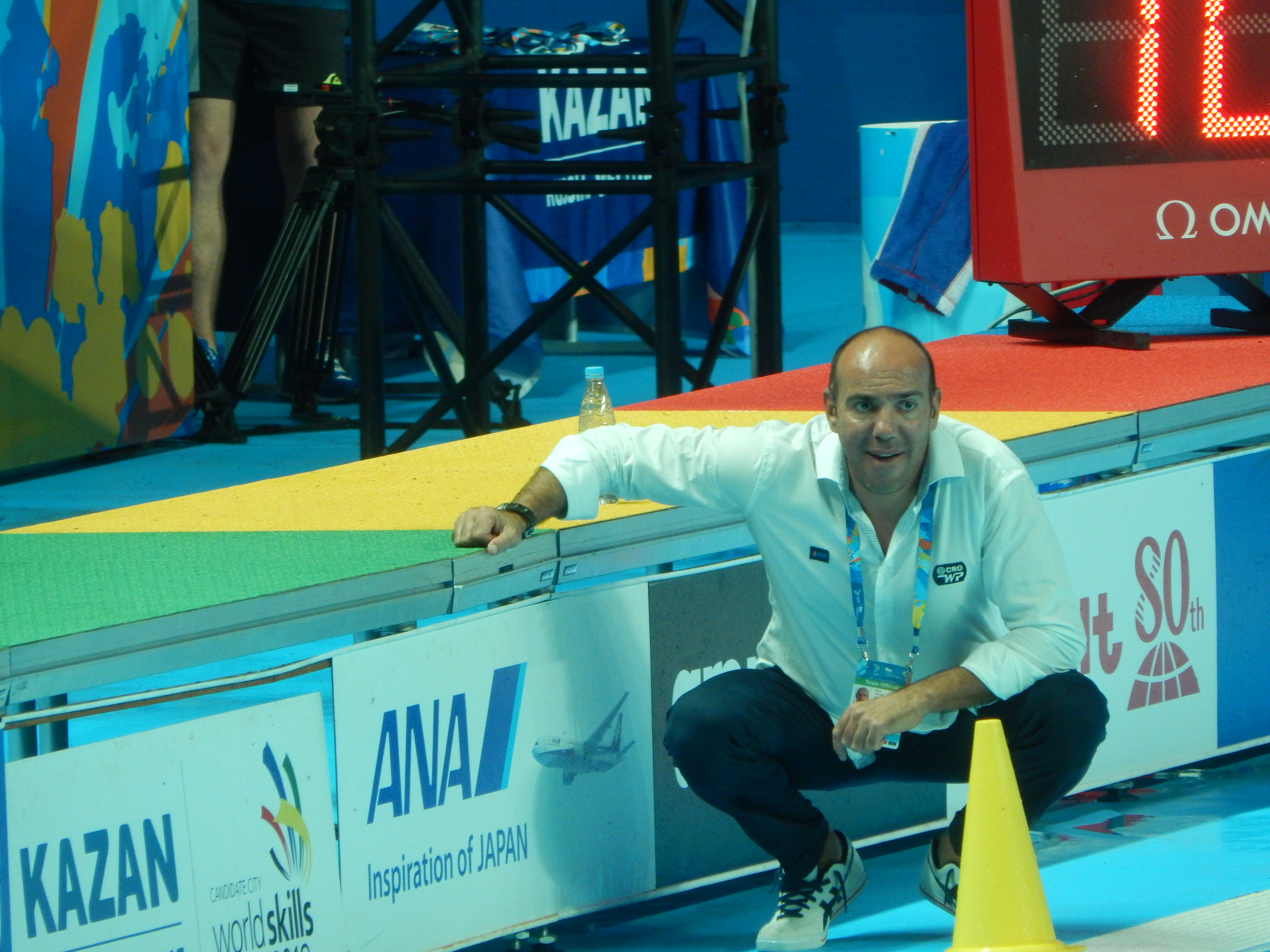
- Tucak as Croatia head coach at the 2015 World Championship

Personal information
- Full name: Ivica Tucak
- Nationality: Croat
- Born: 8 February 1970 (age 56) Šibenik, SR Croatia, SFR Yugoslavia

Sport
- Sport: Water polo
- Current club: Croatia (head coach)

Teams coached
- Years: Team
- 2005–????: Croatia (juniors)
- 2006–2009: VK Šibenik NCP
- 2009–2012: PVK Jadran
- 2010–2011: Croatia (assistant)
- 2012–: Croatia
Medal record
Head Coach for Croatia
Olympic Games
Silver medal – second place	2016 Rio de Janeiro	Coach
Silver medal – second place	2024 Paris	Coach
World Championship
Gold medal – first place	2017 Budapest	Coach
Gold medal – first place	2024 Doha	Coach
Silver medal – second place	2015 Kazan	Coach
Bronze medal – third place	2013 Barcelona	Coach
Bronze medal – third place	2019 Gwangju	Coach
European Championship
Gold medal – first place	2022 Split	Coach
Silver medal – second place	2024 Dubrovnik/Zagreb	Coach
Bronze medal – third place	2018 Barcelona	Coach
Mediterranean Games
Gold medal – first place	2013 Mersin	Coach
World Cup
Bronze medal – third place	2014 Almaty	Coach
World League
Silver medal – second place	2015 Bergamo	Coach
Silver medal – second place	2019 Belgrade	Coach
Bronze medal – third place	2017 Ruza	Coach
Europa Cup
Gold medal – first place	2018 Rijeka	Coach
Silver medal – second place	2019 Zagreb	Coach
World Junior Championship
Gold medal – first place	2009 Šibenik	Coach
European Junior Championship
Bronze medal – third place	2008 Belgrade	Coach

Ivica Tucak (born 8 February 1970) is a Croatian professional water polo coach and former player who has been the head coach of the Croatia men's national water polo team since 16 September 2012.

Winning the gold medal at the 2017 and 2024 World Championship, silver medal at the 2016 Summer Olympics, the gold medal at the 2022 European Championship, and the silver medal at the 2024 Summer Olympics, he is regarded as the most successful coach of the Croatia national team.

== Playing career ==
Tucak started his professional playing career with the junior team of his hometown club VK Šibenik, where he stayed until 1989, playing together with the famous Croatian player, Perica Bukić.

In 1989, he signed with Belgrade-based club Crvena zvezda. In 1991, he went to Switzerland and signed for Bissone Lugano. In 1993, he returned to his home–VK Šibenik–and stayed there for two years. Tucak then went to Italy and stayed there for seven years, playing for Talimar Palermo, Como Milano, Snam Milano and Sori. In 2002, he returned to Croatia and played for VK Medveščak until 2004. He finished his career in 2005 at his hometown club VK Šibenik.

During his professional career, he was not a member of the senior Croatia men's national water polo team.

== Coaching career ==
Tucak started his head coaching career at his hometown club VK Šibenik, managing them to reach the LEN Euro Cup final game in the 2006–07 season. In 2009, he became head coach of Montenegrin First League club PVK Jadran, with which he won two Adriatic Leagues and one national league and cup title.

== National team coaching career ==
In 2005, Tucak started to work as coach of the junior men's Croatia national team along Veselin Đuho, winning the bronze medal at the 2008 European Championship in Belgrade, and the gold medal at the 2009 World Championship in Šibenik.

From 2010 until 2011, Tucak worked as assistant to the head coach of the senior Croatia men's team, Ratko Rudić, while in September 2012, he succeeded him. With Croatia, he won the 2017 World Championship tournament in Hungary. He won another World Championship in 2024 in Qatar, and in 2022 he was also the European champion.

== Personal life ==
Born in Šibenik, Tucak graduated from the water polo at the Zagreb Faculty of Kinesiology in 2013, where his mentor was the famous Croatian water polo player, Dubravko Šimenc. In 2010, City of Šibenik awarded Tucak for the best coach in Šibenik in 2009.

Tucak, with his wife Marijana, had a daughter Tena who died in June 2005, at the age of 3.

Tucak is awarded for the best coach in the world by FINA, in December 2017.

== Honours ==
=== Coach ===
VK Šibenik NCP

- LEN Euro Cup runner-up: 2006–07

PVK Jadran

- Regional League A1: 2009–10, 2010–11
- Montenegrin League: 2009–10, 2011–12
- Montenegrin Cup: 2010–11

== See also ==
- List of world champions in men's water polo
