= Aleksa Ukropina =

Montenegrin water polo player

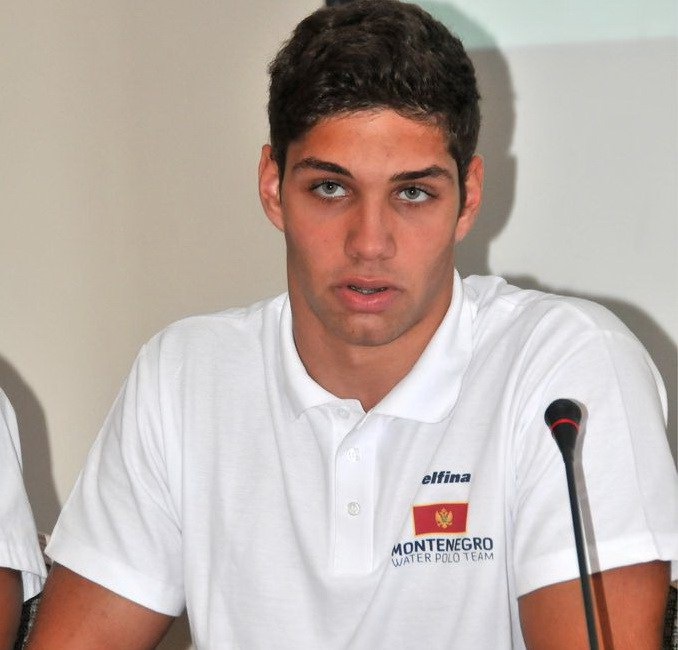
- Aleksa in 2016

Personal information
- Nationality: Montenegrin
- Born: 28 September 1998 (age 27) Belgrade, Serbia, FR Yugoslavia
- Height: 1.96 m (6 ft 5 in)
- Weight: 96 kg (212 lb)

Sport
- Country: Montenegro
- Sport: Water polo
- Club: PVK Jadran 2013 – 2018 Orvosegyetem SC 2018 – 2020 VK Radnički Kragujevac 2020 –
Medal record
Men's water polo
Representing Montenegro
Mediterranean Games
Silver medal – second place	2026 Taranto	Team

Aleksa Ukropina (Serbian Cyrillic: Алекса Укропина; born 28 September 1998) is a Montenegrin water polo player. Aleksa started playing water polo at PVK Jadran, and he is a member of a first squad since 2013. Aleksa is playing for PVK Jadran in competitions like Montenegrin First League of Water Polo, Montenegrin Water Polo Cup, LEN Champions League, Adriatic water polo league.

Aleksa also plays for a senior Montenegro men's national water polo team. He played at 2015 World Aquatics Championships in Kazan and won a 5-th place, 2017 World Aquatics Championships in Budapest and won 5-th place.

In July 2024, Ukropina was issued with a two-year ban backdated to February 2024 for an anti-doping rule violation after testing positive for fenoterol.

== Teams ==
PVK Jadran 2013 – 2018

Orvosegyetem SC 2018 – 2020

VK Radnički Kragujevac 2020 –

== Trophies with clubs ==
Season 2013–2014 – Montenegrin First League of Water Polo – Champions, Montenegrin Water Polo Cup – Champions

Season 2014–2015 – Montenegrin First League of Water Polo – Champions, Montenegrin Water Polo Cup – Champions

Season 2015–2016 – Montenegrin First League of Water Polo – Champions, Montenegrin Water Polo Cup – Champions

Season 2016–2017 – Montenegrin First League of Water Polo – Champions, Montenegrin Water Polo Cup – Champions

Season 2017–2018 – Montenegrin First League of Water Polo – Champions, Montenegrin Water Polo Cup – Champions
