= 2010–11 LEN Euroleague =

Water polo sports season

- League: LEN Euroleague
- Sport: Water Polo
- Duration: 23 September 2010 to 4 June 2011
- Teams: 16 (preliminary round); 34 (total)

Final Four
- Finals champions: (Serbia) Partizan (7th title)
- Runners-up: (Italy) Pro Recco
- Finals MVP: (Hungary) Tamás Kásás (Pro Recco)

Euroleague seasons
- ← 2009–10 2011–12 →

The 2010–11 LEN Euroleague was the highest-level competition in men's European club water polo. It involved the champions and other top teams from European national leagues and ran from September 2010 to May 2011. The Final Four (semifinals, final, and third place game) took place on 3–4 June at Foro Italico, Rome.

== Allocation by federation ==
Water polo federations are allocated places in accordance with their performances in the preliminary round (group stage) of the 2009–10 LEN Euroleague:

- Seeded Federations ranked 1–8 in a ranking of the best-placed team from each federation in the preliminary round of the previous year's competition have three teams qualify. In 2009/10, the preliminary round had exactly eight federations represented: Croatia, Greece, Italy, Hungary, Montenegro, Russia, Serbia, and Spain
- All other federations have two teams qualify and are unseeded

Federations do not have to enter their top two teams into the Euroleague. If they do not think their clubs can be competitive, they can enter teams into the second-tier LEN Cup.

=== Format and Distribution ===
The LEN Euroleague 2010/11 has a slightly different format to previous years with the addition of a second group stage to replace the two-legged quarterfinals. There are five phases to this competition:

- First qualifying round (Round-robin tournament) at a single site the weekend ending 26 September 2010
- Second qualifying round (Round-robin tournament) at a single site the weekend ending 10 October 2010
- Preliminary round (First Group stage) played home and away from 13 November 2010 to 2 February 2011
- Quarterfinal round (Second Group stage) played home and away from 16 February to 4 May 2011
- Final four played as a single knockout tournament on 27–28 May 2011

	Teams entering this round	Teams advancing from the previous round
First qualifying round (no limit on teams)	champions from unseeded federations; runners-up from unseeded federations; 8 third-placed teams from seeded federations	
Second qualifying round (16 teams) (Note: The rules state that there should be 24 teams in the second qualifying round. Due to a lack of teams entered, this has been reduced to 16 teams.)	8 runners-up from seeded federations	4 tournament winners from the first qualifying round; 4 tournament runners-up from the first qualifying round
Preliminary round (First group stage) (16 teams)	8 champions from seeded federations	4 tournament winners from the second qualifying round; 4 tournament runners-up from the second qualifying round
Quarterfinal round (Second group stage) (8 teams)		4 group winners from the preliminary round; 4 group runners-up from the preliminary round
Final Four (4 teams)		2 group winners from the quarterfinal round; 2 group runners-up from the quarterfinal round

=== Teams ===
League positions of the previous season shown in parentheses.

First qualifying round
(Croatia) Primorje Erste Banka (3rd)	(Spain) CN Terrassa (3rd)	(Greece) Vouliagmeni NC (3rd)	(Hungary) Szeged Beton (3rd)
(Italy) Brixia Leonessa Brescia (3rd)	(Montenegro) Budva M-Tel (3rd)	(France) CN Marseille (1st)	(Russia) Shturm 2002 Chehov (3rd)
(Germany) ASC Duisburg (2nd)	(Germany) Spandau 04 Berlin (1st)	(Netherlands) Schurmann BRC (1st)	(Poland) LSTW Łódź (1st)
(Romania) CSM Digi Oradea (1st)	(France) Montpellier Waterpolo (2nd)	(Slovakia) CH Košice (1st)	(Turkey) Galatasaray Istanbul (1st)
(Turkey) Yüzme Istanbul (3rd)	(Ukraine) BMK Karkov (1st)		
Second qualifying round
(Croatia) HAVK Mladost (2nd)	(Spain) CN Barcelona (2nd)	(Greece) Panionios GSS Athens (2nd)	(Hungary) ZF Eger (2nd)
(Italy) RN Savona (2nd)	(Montenegro) Primorac Kotor (2nd)	(Serbia) Vojvodina Novi Sad (2nd)	(Russia) Sintez Kazan (2nd)
Preliminary round (First group stage)
(Croatia) Jug Dubrovnik (1st)	(Spain) CN Atlètic Barceloneta (1st)	(Greece) Olympiacos Piraeus (1st)	(Hungary) Teva-Vasas Uniqa Budapest (1st)
(Italy) Pro Recco^{TH} (1st)	(Montenegro) Jadran Herceg Novi (1st)	(Serbia) Partizan Raiffeisen Belgrade (1st)	(Russia) Spartak Volgograd (1st)

th Title Holder

== Tournament phase ==
=== First qualifying round ===
Key to colors in group tables
Progress to the Second Qualifying Round
Progress to the LEN Cup 2nd Qualifying Round

==== Group A (Košice) ====
Pos	Team	Pld	W	D	L	GF	GA	GD	Pts
1	(Germany) Spandau 04 Berlin	3	3	0	0	28	16	+12	9
2	(Slovakia) CH Košice	3	1	1	1	25	23	+2	4
3	(Spain) CN Terrassa	3	1	0	2	25	30	−5	3
4	(Turkey) Galatasaray Istanbul	3	0	1	2	19	28	−9	1

==== Group B (Istanbul) ====
Pos	Team	Pld	W	D	L	GF	GA	GD	Pts
1	(Italy) Brixia Leonessa Brescia	4	4	0	0	47	30	+17	12
2	(Greece) Vouliagmeni NC	4	3	0	1	39	27	+12	9
3	(Germany) ASC Duisburg	4	1	0	3	35	31	+4	3
4	(Turkey) Yumze Istanbul	4	1	0	3	29	45	−16	3
5	(Ukraine) BMK Karkov	4	1	0	3	22	39	−17	3

==== Group C (Szeged) ====
Pos	Team	Pld	W	D	L	GF	GA	GD	Pts
1	(Croatia) Primorje EB	3	3	0	0	31	19	+12	9
2	(Hungary) Szeged Beton	3	2	0	1	30	18	+12	6
3	(France) Montpellier Waterpolo	3	1	0	2	19	28	−9	3
4	(Romania) CSM Digi Oradea	3	0	0	3	17	32	−15	0

==== Group D (Budva) ====
Pos	Team	Pld	W	D	L	GF	GA	GD	Pts
1	(Montenegro) Budva M-Tel	4	4	0	0	55	28	+27	12
2	(France) CN Marseille	4	3	0	1	50	27	+23	9
3	(Netherlands) Schurmann BRC	4	2	0	2	32	36	−4	6
4	(Russia) Shturm 2002 Chehov	4	1	0	3	46	40	+6	3
5	(Poland) LSTW Lodz	4	0	0	4	18	70	−52	0

=== Second qualifying round ===
Key to colors in group tables
Progress to the Group Stage
Progress to the LEN Cup 2nd Qualifying Round

=== Group E (Barcelona) ===
Pos	Team	Pld	W	D	L	GF	GA	GD	Pts
1	(Montenegro) Budva M-Tel	3	3	0	0	29	22	+7	9
2	(Spain) CN Barcelona	3	2	0	1	27	30	−3	6
3	(Italy) RN Savona	3	1	0	2	27	20	+7	3
4	(Greece) Vouliagmeni NC	3	0	0	3	19	30	−11	0

Matchday One
CN Barcelona	7–12	Budva M-Tel
Vouliagmeni NC	2–11	RN Savona
Matchday Two
CN Barcelona	10–9	Vouliagmeni NC
Budva M-Tel	8–7	RN Savona
Matchday Three
Vouliagmeni NC	8–9	Budva M-Tel
CN Barcelona	10–9	RN Savona

=== Group F (Novi Sad) ===
Pos	Team	Pld	W	D	L	GF	GA	GD	Pts
1	(Hungary) Szeged Beton	3	3	0	0	32	24	+8	9
2	(Serbia) Vojvodina Novi Sad	3	2	0	1	21	22	−1	6
3	(Italy) Brixia Leonessa Brescia	3	0	1	2	24	27	−3	1
4	(Russia) Sintez Kazan	3	0	1	2	23	27	−4	1

Matchday One
Vojvodina Novi Sad	6–11	Szeged Beton
Brixia Leonessa Brescia	9–9	Sintez Kazan
Matchday Two
Vojvodina Novi Sad	7–5	Brixia Leonessa Brescia
Sintez Kazan	8–10	Szeged Beton
Matchday Three
Vojvodina Novi Sad	8–6	Sintez Kazan
Brixia Leonessa Brescia	10–11	Szeged Beton

=== Group G (Berlin) ===
Pos	Team	Pld	W	D	L	GF	GA	GD	Pts
1	(Croatia) HAVK Mladost	3	3	0	0	38	28	+10	9
2	(Hungary) ZF Eger	3	2	0	1	32	26	+6	6
3	(Germany) Spandau 04 Berlin	3	1	0	2	24	29	−5	3
4	(France) CN Marseille	3	0	0	3	22	33	−11	0

Matchday One
Mladost Zagreb	13–12	ZF Eger
Spandau 04 Berlin	10–7	CN Marseille
Matchday Two
Mladost Zagreb	12–7	CN Marseille
Spandau 04 Berlin	5–9	ZF Eger
Matchday Three
CN Marseille	8–11	ZF Eger
Spandau 04 Berlin	9–13	Mladost Zagreb

=== Group G (Rijeka) ===
Pos	Team	Pld	W	D	L	GF	GA	GD	Pts
1	(Croatia) Primorje EB	3	3	0	0	40	23	+17	9
2	(Montenegro) Primorac Kotor	3	2	0	1	30	19	+11	6
3	(Greece) Panionios GSS Athens	3	1	0	2	20	29	−9	3
4	(Slovakia) CH Košice	3	0	0	3	19	38	−19	0

Matchday One
Primorje EB	19–8	CH Košice
Panionios GSS Athens	4–12	Primorac Kotor
Matchday Two
Primorje EB	12–9	Primorac Kotor
CH Košice	8–10	Panionios GSS Athens
Matchday Three
CH Košice	3–9	Primorac Kotor
Primorje EB	9–6	Panionios GSS Athens

== Group stage ==
Key to colors in group tables
Progress to the Quarterfinal Round
Eliminated

=== Group A ===
Pos	Team	Pld	W	D	L	GF	GA	GD	Pts
1	(Montenegro) Jadran Herceg Novi	6	4	0	2	61	57	+4	12
2	(Hungary) Teva-Vasas Uniqa Budapest	6	3	1	2	54	56	−2	10 (Note: Tiebreaker: 2–0)
3	(Montenegro) Primorac Kotor	6	3	1	2	58	48	+10	10 (Note: Tiebreaker: 0–2)
4	(Hungary) Szeged Beton	6	0	2	4	52	64	−12	2

Notes:

Matchday One
Szeged Beton	9–9	Teva-Vasas Uniqa Budapest
Primorac Kotor	12–7	Jadran Herceg Novi
Matchday Two
Jadran Herceg Novi	13–10	Szeged Beton
Teva-Vasas Uniqa Budapest	7–6	Primorac Kotor
Matchday Three
Szeged Beton	7–13	Primorac Kotor
Jadran Herceg Novi	11–10	Teva-Vasas Uniqa Budapest
Matchday Four
Primorac Kotor	9–9	Szeged Beton
Teva-Vasas Uniqa Budapest	8–12	Jadran Herceg Novi
Matchday Five
Primorac Kotor	8–9	Teva-Vasas Uniqa Budapest
Szeged Beton	7–9	Jadran Herceg Novi
Matchday Six
Teva-Vasas Uniqa Budapest	11–10	Szeged Beton
Jadran Herceg Novi	9–10	Primorac Kotor

=== Group B ===
Pos	Team	Pld	W	D	L	GF	GA	GD	Pts
1	(Italy) Pro Recco	6	6	0	0	73	32	+41	18
2	(Montenegro) Budva M-Tel	6	3	0	3	44	40	+4	9
3	(Russia) Spartak Volgograd	6	1	1	4	35	56	−21	4
4	(Serbia) Vojvodina Novi Sad	6	1	1	4	41	65	−24	4

Matchday One
Budva M-Tel	9–7	Vojvodina Novi Sad
Pro Recco	16–5	Spartak Volgograd
Matchday Two
Vojvodina Novi Sad	8–15	Pro Recco
Spartak Volgograd	6–5	Budva M-Tel
Matchday Three
Pro Recco	12–7	Budva M-Tel
Vojvodina Novi Sad	10–10	Spartak Volgograd
Matchday Four
Spartak Volgograd	6–8	Vojvodina Novi Sad
Budva M-Tel	5–6	Pro Recco
Matchday Five
Pro Recco	16–2	Vojvodina Novi Sad
Budva M-Tel	9–3	Spartak Volgograd
Matchday Six
Vojvodina Novi Sad	6–9	Budva M-Tel
Spartak Volgograd	5–8	Pro Recco

=== Group C ===
Pos	Team	Pld	W	D	L	GF	GA	GD	Pts
1	(Croatia) HAVK Mladost	6	5	0	1	62	49	+13	15
2	(Serbia) Partizan Raiffeisen Belgrade	6	4	1	1	57	40	+17	13
3	(Spain) CN Barcelona	6	1	1	4	41	59	−18	4
4	(Greece) Olympiacos Piraeus	6	1	0	5	45	57	−12	3

Matchday One
CN Barcelona	10–8	Olympiacos Piraeus
HAVK Mladost	10–8	Partizan Raiffeisen Belgrade
Matchday Two
Olympiacos Piraeus	8–9	HAVK Mladost
Partizan Raiffeisen Belgrade	6–6	CN Barcelona
Matchday Three
Olympiacos Piraeus	7–9	Partizan Raiffeisen Belgrade
HAVK Mladost	10–4	CN Barcelona
Matchday Four
Partizan Raiffeisen Belgrade	7–1	Olympiacos Piraeus
CN Barcelona	5–11	HAVK Mladost
Matchday Five
HAVK Mladost	15–10	Olympiacos Piraeus
CN Barcelona	9–13	Partizan Raiffeisen Belgrade
Matchday Six
Partizan Raiffeisen Belgrade	14–7	HAVK Mladost
Olympiacos Piraeus	11–7	CN Barcelona

=== Group D ===
Pos	Team	Pld	W	D	L	GF	GA	GD	Pts
1	(Croatia) Jug Dubrovnik	6	6	0	0	77	52	+25	18
2	(Croatia) Primorje Erste Banka	6	3	0	3	47	45	+2	9 (Note: Tiebreaker: 1–1,+1)
3	(Spain) CN Atlètic Barceloneta	6	3	0	3	55	65	−10	9 (Note: Tiebreaker: 1–1,-1)
4	(Hungary) ZF Eger	6	0	0	6	46	63	−17	0

Notes:

Matchday One
CN Atlètic Barceloneta	10–9	ZF Eger
Jug Dubrovnik	12–7	Primorje Erste Banka
Matchday Two
ZF Eger	9–10	Jug Dubrovnik
Primorje Erste Banka	8–6	CN Atlètic Barceloneta
Matchday Three
Jug Dubrovnik	14–9	CN Atlètic Barceloneta
ZF Eger	6–11	Primorje Erste Banka
Matchday Four
Primorje Erste Banka	7–4	ZF Eger
CN Atlètic Barceloneta	11–18	Jug Dubrovnik
Matchday Five
Jug Dubrovnik	15–10	ZF Eger
CN Atlètic Barceloneta	9–8	Primorje Erste Banka
Matchday Six
Primorje Erste Banka	6–8	Jug Dubrovnik
ZF Eger	8–10	CN Atlètic Barceloneta

== Quarterfinal Round (Second Group Stage) ==
Key to colors in group tables
Progress to the Final Four
Eliminated

=== Group A ===
Pos	Team	Pld	W	D	L	GF	GA	GD	Pts
1	(Serbia) Partizan Raiffeisen Belgrade	6	6	0	0	69	43	+26	18
2	(Montenegro) Budva M-Tel	6	3	0	3	37	48	−11	9
3	(Croatia) Jug Dubrovnik	6	2	1	3	57	52	+5	7
4	(Montenegro) Jadran Herceg Novi	6	0	1	5	42	62	−20	1

Matchday One
Jug Dubrovnik (Croatia)	10–6	(Montenegro) Budva M-Tel
Jadran Herceg Novi (Montenegro)	8–13	(Serbia) Partizan Raiffeisen Belgrade
Matchday Two
Budva M-Tel (Montenegro)	6–5	(Montenegro) Jadran Herceg Novi
Partizan Raiffeisen Belgrade (Serbia)	11–10	(Croatia) Jug Dubrovnik
Matchday Three
Jug Dubrovnik (Croatia)	13–6	(Montenegro) Jadran Herceg Novi
Partizan Raiffeisen Belgrade (Serbia)	10–2	(Montenegro) Budva M-Tel
Matchday Four
Budva M-Tel (Montenegro)	5–8	(Serbia) Partizan Raiffeisen Belgrade
Jadran Herceg Novi (Montenegro)	7–7	(Croatia) Jug Dubrovnik
Matchday Five
Jug Dubrovnik (Croatia)	10–13	(Serbia) Partizan Raiffeisen Belgrade
Jadran Herceg Novi (Montenegro)	5–6	(Montenegro) Budva M-Tel
Matchday Six
Partizan Raiffeisen Belgrade (Serbia)	14–8	(Montenegro) Jadran Herceg Novi
Budva M-Tel (Montenegro)	9–7	(Croatia) Jug Dubrovnik

=== Group B ===
Pos	Team	Pld	W	D	L	GF	GA	GD	Pts
1	(Italy) Ferla Pro Recco	6	6	0	0	68	42	+26	18
2	(Croatia) HAVK Mladost	6	3	0	3	46	52	−6	9
3	(Croatia) Primorje Erste Banka	6	2	1	3	58	61	−3	7
4	(Hungary) Teva-Vasas Uniqa Budapest	6	0	1	5	46	63	−17	1

Matchday One
HAVK Mladost (Croatia)	5–9	(Italy) Ferla Pro Recco
Primorje Erste Banka (Croatia)	13–6	(Hungary) Teva-Vasas Uniqa Budapest
Matchday Two
Teva-Vasas Uniqa Budapest (Hungary)	8–9	(Croatia) HAVK Mladost
Ferla Pro Recco (Italy)	15–9	(Croatia) Primorje Erste Banka
Matchday Three
Primorje Erste Banka (Croatia)	8–6	(Croatia) HAVK Mladost
Ferla Pro Recco (Italy)	12–6	(Hungary) Teva-Vasas Uniqa Budapest
Matchday Four
HAVK Mladost (Croatia)	10–9	(Croatia) Primorje Erste Banka
Teva-Vasas Uniqa Budapest (Hungary)	7–9	(Italy) Ferla Pro Recco
Matchday Five
HAVK Mladost (Croatia)	8–7	(Hungary) Teva-Vasas Uniqa Budapest
Primorje Erste Banka (Croatia)	7–12	(Italy) Ferla Pro Recco
Matchday Six
Teva-Vasas Uniqa Budapest (Hungary)	12–12	(Croatia) Primorje Erste Banka
Ferla Pro Recco (Italy)	11–8	(Croatia) HAVK Mladost

== Final Four (Rome) ==
Stadio Olimpico del Nuoto, Rome, Italy

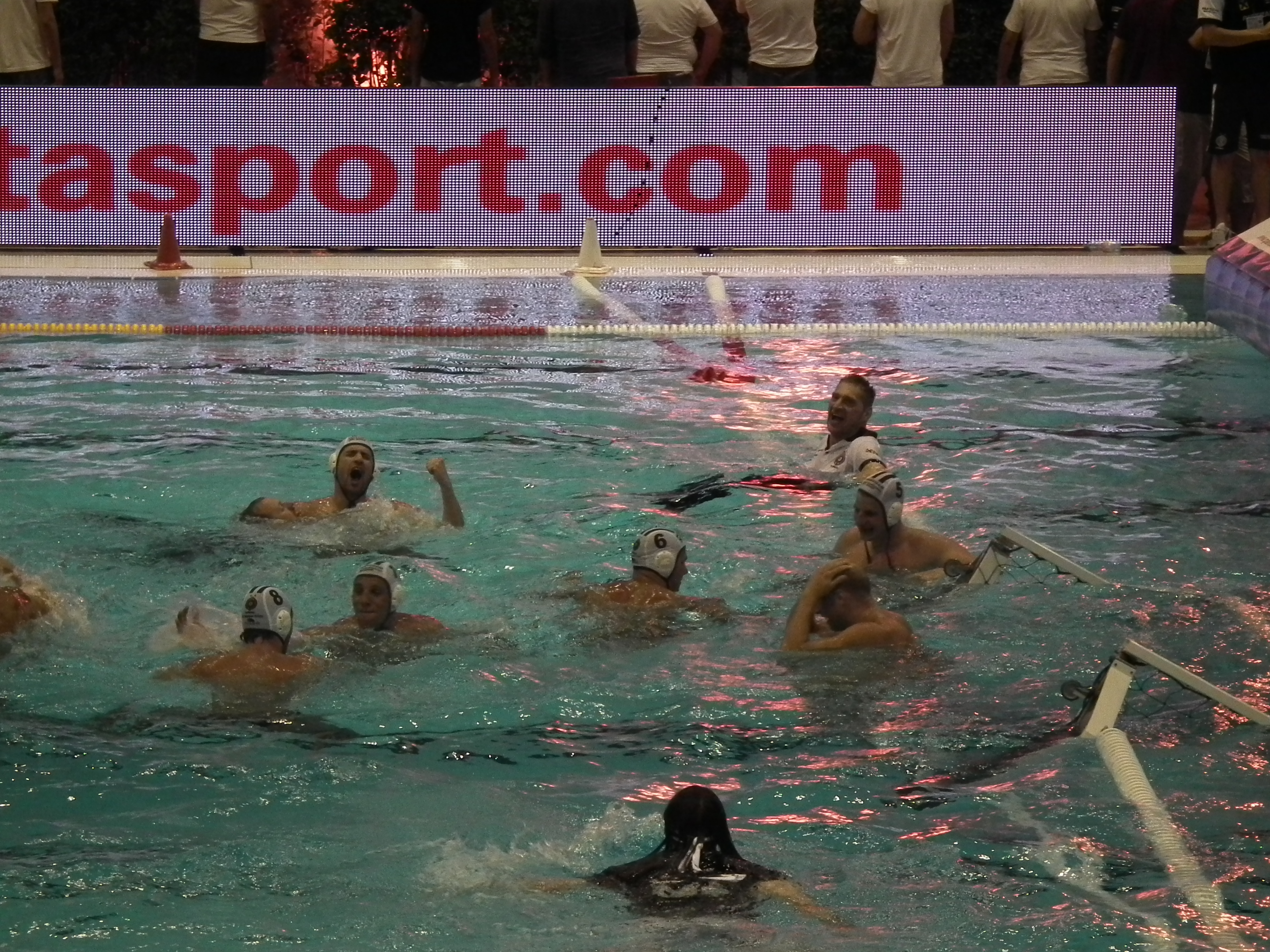
The end of the final match.

Semifinals; 3 June 2011
(Serbia) Partizan	12
(Croatia) HAVK Mladost	9
(Italy) Pro Recco	9
(Montenegro) Budva	4

Final; 4 June 2011
(Serbia) Partizan	11
(Italy) Pro Recco	7
Third place
(Croatia) HAVK Mladost (pen)	14
(Montenegro) Budva	12

Semi-finals

3 June; 19:30	[ Report]	Partizan (Serbia)	12–9	(Croatia) HAVK Mladost	Stadio Olimpico del Nuoto, Rome; Referees: Tulga, Spiegel
3 June; 19:30	[ Report]	Score by quarters: 2–1, 4–1, 3–3, 4–4			Stadio Olimpico del Nuoto, Rome; Referees: Tulga, Spiegel
3 June; 19:30	[ Report]	Radović, Mitrović 3	Goals	Udovičić, Muslim 2	Stadio Olimpico del Nuoto, Rome; Referees: Tulga, Spiegel

3 June; 21:00	[ Report]	Pro Recco (Italy)	9–4	(Montenegro) Budva	Stadio Olimpico del Nuoto, Rome; Referees: Alexandrescu, Borrel Sanchez
3 June; 21:00	[ Report]	Score by quarters: 3–1, 2–0, 1–1, 3–2			Stadio Olimpico del Nuoto, Rome; Referees: Alexandrescu, Borrel Sanchez
3 June; 21:00	[ Report]	Benedek, Zloković 2	Goals	Danilović 2	Stadio Olimpico del Nuoto, Rome; Referees: Alexandrescu, Borrel Sanchez

Third place

4 June 2011; 19:30	[ Report]	HAVK Mladost (Croatia)	14–12 (OT)	(Montenegro) Budva	Stadio Olimpico del Nuoto, Rome; Referees: Stavropuolos, Alexandrescu
4 June 2011; 19:30	[ Report]	Score by quarters: 2–1, 1–4, 1–2, 4–1 OT: 2–1, 0–1; pen. 4–2			Stadio Olimpico del Nuoto, Rome; Referees: Stavropuolos, Alexandrescu
4 June 2011; 19:30	[ Report]	Udovičić, Karač 4	Goals	Pasković 3	Stadio Olimpico del Nuoto, Rome; Referees: Stavropuolos, Alexandrescu

Final

4 June 2011; 21:00	[ Report]	Partizan (Serbia)	11–7	(Italy) Pro Recco	Stadio Olimpico del Nuoto, Rome; Referees: Tulga, Borrel Sanchez
4 June 2011; 21:00	[ Report]	Score by quarters: 2–1, 5–4, 2–1, 2–1			Stadio Olimpico del Nuoto, Rome; Referees: Tulga, Borrel Sanchez
4 June 2011; 21:00	[ Report]	Korolija 3	Goals	Madaras 3	Stadio Olimpico del Nuoto, Rome; Referees: Tulga, Borrel Sanchez

2010–11 Euroleague
champions

7th title

Slobodan Soro, Theodoros Chatzitheodorou, Nikola Rađen, Miloš Korolija, Milan Aleksić, Duško Pijetlović, Andrija Prlainović, Aleksandar Radović, Dušan Mandić, Stefan Mitrović, Vladimir Vujasinović, Miloš Ćuk, Nikola Dedović, Stefan Živojinović
Head coach
Igor Milanović

=== Final standings ===
	Team
	(Serbia) Partizan
Silver medal	(Italy) Pro Recco
Bronze medal	(Croatia) HAVK Mladost
	(Montenegro) Budva

=== Awards ===
Final four MVP
(Hungary) Tamás Kásás (Pro Recco)
