= Miloš Korolija =

Serbian water polo coach and player

Personal information
- Born: November 21, 1981 (age 44)

Sport
- Sport: Water polo
Medal record
Representing Serbia and Montenegro
Universiade
Gold medal – first place	2003 Daegu	Team Competition
Mediterranean Games
Bronze medal – third place	2005 Almería	Team Competition

Miloš Korolija (Serbian Cyrillic: Милош Королија; 21 November 1981) is a Serbian water polo coach and former player. He currently serves as the head coach for VK Partizan.

== Clubs honours ==
- 2010-11 LEN Euroleague - Champion, with Partizan Raiffeisen
