= Swimming at the 2008 Summer Olympics – Women's 200 metre breaststroke =

Women's 200 metre breaststroke at the Games of the XXIX Olympiad
- Venue: Beijing National Aquatics Center
- Date: August 13, 2008 (heats); August 14, 2008 (semifinals); August 15, 2008 (final)
- Competitors: 41 from 34 nations
- Winning time: 2:20.22 WR

Medalists
1st place, gold medalist(s)		Rebecca Soni	United States
2nd place, silver medalist(s)		Leisel Jones	Australia
3rd place, bronze medalist(s)		Sara Nordenstam	Norway

The women's 200 metre breaststroke event at the 2008 Olympic Games took place on 13–15 August at the Beijing National Aquatics Center in Beijing, China.

U.S. swimmer Rebecca Soni pulled away over the final lap to capture gold and set a new world record of 2:20.22. Australia's world record holder and top favorite Leisel Jones enjoyed a strong lead in the first 100 metres, but ended up only with a silver in 2:22.05, almost two seconds behind Soni. Meanwhile, Sara Nordenstam earned Norway's second Olympic medal in swimming, as she powered home with a bronze in a European record of 2:23.02.

Austria's Mirna Jukić finished outside the medals in fourth place at 2:23.24, while Russia's Yuliya Yefimova set a national record of 2:23.76 to hold off Canada's Annamay Pierse (2:23.77) for a fifth spot by a hundredth of a second (0.01). Japanese duo Rie Kaneto (2:25.14) and Megumi Taneda (2:25.23) closed out the field.

Notable swimmers failed to reach the top 8 final, featuring Germany's Anne Poleska, bronze medalist in Athens four years earlier. Competing at her fourth Olympics, defending champion Amanda Beard placed eighteenth in 2:27.70, but missed the semifinals by 0.42 seconds.

Earlier in the prelims, Soni posted a top-seeded time of 2:22.17 to lead the heats, cutting off Beard's Olympic record by exactly two-tenths of a second (0.20).

== Records ==
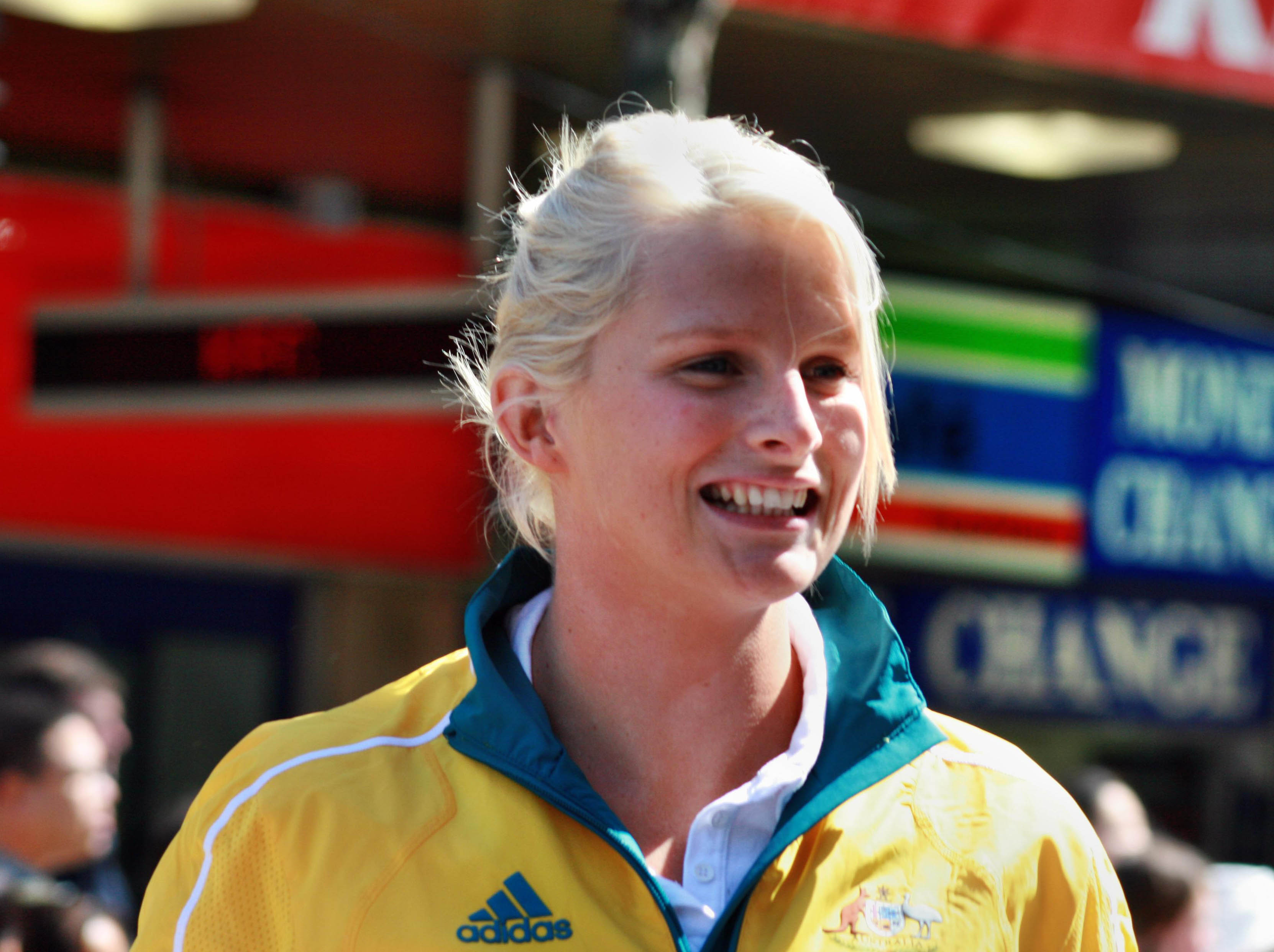
Leisel Jones, the world record holder and favourite for the 200 m breaststroke.

Prior to this competition, the existing world and Olympic records were as follows.

World record	Leisel Jones (AUS)	2:20.54	Melbourne, Australia	1 February 2006	
Olympic record	Amanda Beard (USA)	2:23.37	Athens, Greece	19 August 2004	-

The following new world and Olympic records were set during this competition.

Date	Event	Name	Nationality	Time	Record
August 13	Heat 5	Rebecca Soni	United States	2:22.17	OR
August 15	Final	Rebecca Soni	United States	2:20.22	WR

== Results ==
=== Heats ===
Rank	Heat	Lane	Name	Nationality	Time	Notes
1	5	4	Rebecca Soni	United States	2:22.17	Q, OR
2	6	4	Leisel Jones	Australia	2:23.81	Q
3	6	5	Mirna Jukić	Austria	2:24.39	Q
4	6	1	Sara Nordenstam	Norway	2:24.47	Q
5	4	6	Rie Kaneto	Japan	2:24.62	Q
6	5	5	Megumi Taneda	Japan	2:24.75	Q
7	4	5	Annamay Pierse	Canada	2:25.01	Q
8	4	4	Yuliya Yefimova	Russia	2:25.07	Q
9	5	7	Suzaan van Biljon	South Africa	2:25.51	Q
10	5	3	Sally Foster	Australia	2:25.54	Q
11	6	3	Jung Seul-ki	South Korea	2:25.95	Q
12	6	6	Joline Höstman	Sweden	2:26.00	Q
13	6	2	Qi Hui	China	2:26.16	Q
14	5	2	Anne Poleska	Germany	2:26.74	Q
15	4	8	Elise Matthysen	Belgium	2:27.04	Q
16	4	1	Jeong Da-rae	South Korea	2:27.28	Q
17	3	7	Inna Kapishina	Belarus	2:27.34	NR
18	4	3	Amanda Beard	United States	2:27.70	
19	2	2	Siow Yi Ting	Malaysia	2:27.80	
20	4	2	Olga Detenyuk	Russia	2:27.87	
20	5	1	Kirsty Balfour	Great Britain	2:27.87	
22	3	4	Adriana Marmolejo	Mexico	2:28.10	NR
23	6	8	Yuliya Pidlisna	Ukraine	2:28.84	
24	4	7	Mireia Belmonte García	Spain	2:29.46	
25	2	4	Alia Atkinson	Jamaica	2:29.53	
26	6	7	Luo Nan	China	2:29.67	
27	3	1	Katalin Bor	Hungary	2:29.95	
28	3	2	Sara El Bekri	Morocco	2:30.04	
29	3	3	Diana Gomes	Portugal	2:30.18	
30	5	8	Sophie de Ronchi	France	2:30.93	
31	2	7	Marina Kuč	Montenegro	2:31.24	NR
32	2	3	Dilara Buse Günaydin	Turkey	2:31.86	
33	3	6	Nađa Higl	Serbia	2:32.78	
34	2	6	Smiljana Marinović	Croatia	2:32.80	
35	1	5	Raminta Dvariškytė	Lithuania	2:33.32	
36	2	5	Nicolette Teo	Singapore	2:34.60	
37	3	8	Agustina de Giovanni	Argentina	2:34.94	
38	3	5	Angeliki Exarchou	Greece	2:36.83	
39	1	3	Noora Laukkanen	Finland	2:38.97	
40	1	4	Tatiane Sakemi	Brazil	2:39.13	
	5	6	Sarah Poewe	Germany	DNS	

=== Semifinals ===
==== Semifinal 1 ====
Rank	Lane	Name	Nationality	Time	Notes
1	4	Leisel Jones	Australia	2:23.04	Q
2	5	Sara Nordenstam	Norway	2:23.79	Q, EU
3	6	Yuliya Yefimova	Russia	2:24.00	Q
4	3	Megumi Taneda	Japan	2:25.42	Q
5	2	Sally Foster	Australia	2:26.33	
6	1	Anne Poleska	Germany	2:26.71	
7	7	Joline Höstman	Sweden	2:27.14	
8	8	Jeong Da-rae	South Korea	2:28.28	

==== Semifinal 2 ====
Rank	Lane	Name	Nationality	Time	Notes
1	4	Rebecca Soni	United States	2:22.64	Q
2	5	Mirna Jukić	Austria	2:23.76	Q, EU
3	6	Annamay Pierse	Canada	2:23.94	Q
4	3	Rie Kaneto	Japan	2:25.65	Q
5	7	Jung Seul-ki	South Korea	2:26.83	
6	1	Qi Hui	China	2:27.63	
7	2	Suzaan van Biljon	South Africa	2:28.45	
8	8	Elise Matthysen	Belgium	2:29.64	

=== Final ===
Rank	Lane	Name	Nationality	Time	Notes
1st place, gold medalist(s)	4	Rebecca Soni	United States	2:20.22	WR
2nd place, silver medalist(s)	5	Leisel Jones	Australia	2:22.05	
3rd place, bronze medalist(s)	6	Sara Nordenstam	Norway	2:23.02	EU
4	3	Mirna Jukić	Austria	2:23.24	NR
5	7	Yuliya Yefimova	Russia	2:23.76	NR
6	2	Annamay Pierse	Canada	2:23.77	NR
7	1	Rie Kaneto	Japan	2:25.14	
8	8	Megumi Taneda	Japan	2:25.23	
