= Montenegrin Second League of Water Polo =

Water polo league in Montenegro

Second Water Polo League
- Sport: Water polo
- Founded: 2006
- No. of teams: 6
- Country: Montenegro
- Continent: (European Union) Europe
- Most recent champion: Kumbor
- Most titles: Bokelj (6 titles)
- Level on pyramid: 2
- Domestic cup: Montenegrin Water Polo Cup
- Website: Official Website

The Montenegrin Second League of Water Polo is the lower water polo league in Montenegro. It is organized by the Water Polo and Swimming Federation of Montenegro. League is playing during the summer months.

== History ==
Before Montenegrin independence, competition was known as a Montenegrin Republic Championship (3rd tier) or Montenegrin Amateur League. Since 2006, its name is Second Montenegrin League.

League is playing from July to August, and participants are mainly clubs from Bay of Kotor. Other clubs which played in the past were from Budva, Podgorica and Nikšić.

== Champions ==
Since 2006, five different clubs won the champion title of Montenegrin Second League. Most successful was VPK Bokelj from Baošići with six titles.

Montenegrin Second League of Water Polo
Season	Champion	Runner-up
2007	VPK Bokelj Baošići	VK Kumbor
2008	VPK Bokelj Baošići	VK Risan
2009	VK Risan	VPK Bokelj Baošići
2010	VK Galeb Zelenika	VK Risan
2011	VPK Bokelj Baošići	VK Galeb Zelenika
2012	VK Galeb Zelenika	VPK Bokelj Baošići
2013	VK Kumbor	VK Galeb Zelenika
2014	VK Risan	VK Kumbor
2015	VPK Bokelj Baošići	VK Kumbor
2016	VPK Bokelj Baošići	VK Kumbor
2017	VPK Bokelj Baošići	VK Kumbor
2018	VK Kumbor	VK Galeb Zelenika
2019	VK Kumbor	VPK Bokelj Baošići

== See also ==
- Montenegrin First League of Water Polo
- Montenegrin Water Polo Cup
