= Megumi Taneda =

Japanese swimmer (born 1986)

Personal information
- Full name: Megumi Taneda
- National team: Japan
- Born: 20 September 1986 (age 39) Sapporo, Hokkaido, Japan
- Height: 1.62 m (5 ft 4 in)
- Weight: 57 kg (126 lb)

Sport
- Sport: Swimming
- Strokes: Breaststroke
- Club: JSS Nagaoka
- Coach: Yoshiaki Takemura
Medal record
Women's swimming
Representing Japan
Summer Universiade
Gold medal – first place	2005 İzmir	200 m breaststroke

Megumi Taneda (種田恵, Taneda Megumi; born September 20, 1986) is a Japanese swimmer, who specialized in breaststroke events. She claimed the 200 m breaststroke title in a close race against U.S. swimmer and eventual Olympic champion Rebecca Soni by 0.03 of a second at the 2005 Summer Universiade in İzmir, Turkey, with a time of 2:27.81. Taneda is an economics graduate at Kanagawa University in Kanagawa.

Taneda competed for the Japanese team in a breaststroke double at the 2008 Summer Olympics in Beijing. Leading up to the Games, she emerged the only swimmer to meet the Olympic qualifying standard in the 100 m breaststroke with a 1:07.91, and then beat her rival Rie Kaneto to clear the FINA-A cut time in 2:24.54 for a 200 m breaststroke victory at the Olympic trials in Tokyo. On the second day of the Games, Taneda missed out the semifinals by 0.08 of a second, after finishing seventeenth in the preliminary heats of the 100 m breaststroke in 1:08.45. In her second event, 200 m breaststroke, Taneda rounded out the final in last place by nine hundredths of a second (0.09) behind her teammate Rie Kaneto in 2:25.23.
