= 2010–11 LEN Cup =

The 2010–11 Men's LEN Trophy was the second tier of European competition in water polo. It ran from October 2010 to April 2011.

== Federation team allocation ==
Each national federation can enter up to two teams into the LEN Trophy. 16 additional teams eliminated from the qualifying rounds of the 2010/11 Euroleague are transferred to the Men's LEN Trophy.

=== Distribution ===
	Teams entering in this round	Teams advancing from previous round	Teams transferred from Euroleague
First Qualifying Round	1 or 2 teams from each federation		
Second Qualifying Round (32 teams)		4 tournament winners from the first qualifying round; 4 tournament runners-up from the first qualifying round; 4 tournament third-placed teams from the first qualifying round; 4 tournament fourth-placed teams from the first qualifying round	4 tournament third-placed teams from the first qualifying round; 4 tournament fourth-placed teams from the first qualifying round; 4 tournament third-placed teams from the second qualifying round; 4 tournament fourth-placed teams from the second qualifying round
Knockout Phase (16 teams)		8 tournament winners from the second qualifying round; 8 tournament runners-up from the second qualifying round	

=== Teams ===
First qualifying round
(France) Douai (3rd)	(France) Olympic Nice (4th)	(Georgia (country)) Ligamus Tbilisi (1st)	(Germany) SV Bayer Uerdingen (3rd)
(Germany) SSV Esslingen (4th)	(Greece) NOP Patras (?)	(Greece) AC Paok Thessaloniki (?)	(Hungary) FTC Fisher Clima Budapest (4th)
(Hungary) Honved Groupama Budapest (5th)	(Republic of Ireland) Belfast Wolfhounds (1st)	(Israel) ASA Tel Aviv (1st)	(Italy) CN Posillipo Naples (4th)
(Italy) RN Florentia (5th)	(Montenegro) Akademija Cattaro (4th)	(Montenegro) Val Prancj (5th)	(Russia) Dinamo SHVSM Moscow (4th)
(Slovenia) Rokava Koper (1st)	(Serbia) WC Zac (?)	(Turkey) Enka Istanbul (5th)	(Turkey) Orta Dogu Ankara (6th)
(Ukraine) Ilyechevets Mariupol (2nd)			
Second qualifying round
(Spain) CN Terrassa	(Turkey) Galatasaray Istanbul	(Germany) ASC Duisburg	(Turkey) Yumze Istanbul
(France) Montpellier Waterpolo	(Romania) CSM Digi Oradea	(Netherlands) Schurmann BRC	(Russia) Shturm 2002 Chehov
(Italy) RN Savona	(Greece) Vouliagmeni NC	(Italy) Brixia Leonessa Brescia	(Russia) Sintez Kazan
(Germany) Spandau 04 Berlin	(France) CN Marseille	(Greece) Panionios GSS Athens	(Slovakia) CH Košice

== Round and Draw Dates ==
Tournament Phase	Draw Date	Tournament	
First Qualifying Round	6 August 2010	Ends 10 October 2010	
Second Qualifying Round		Ends 24 October 2010	
Knockout Phase	Draw Date	1st Leg	2nd Leg
Round of 16		13/14 November 2010	18/19 December 2010
Quarterfinals		19 January 2011	2 February 2011
Semifinals		16 February 2011	9 March 2011
Final		13 April 2011	27 April 2011

== Tournament Phase ==
=== First qualifying round ===
Key to colours in group tables
Progress to the Second Qualifying Round

==== Group A (Tbilisi) ====
	Team	PL	W	D	L	F	A	Pts
1.	(Italy) CN Posillipo Naples	0	0	0	0	0	0	0
2.	(France) Olympic Nice	0	0	0	0	0	0	0
3.	(Hungary) Honved Groupama Budapest	0	0	0	0	0	0	0
4.	(Turkey) Enka Istanbul	0	0	0	0	0	0	0
5.	(Israel) ASA Tel Aviv	0	0	0	0	0	0	0
6.	(Georgia (country)) Ligamus Tbilisi	0	0	0	0	0	0	0

==== Group B (Kotor) ====
	Team	PL	W	D	L	F	A	Pts
1.	(Montenegro) Akademija Cattaro	0	0	0	0	0	0	0
2.	(Germany) SV Weiden	0	0	0	0	0	0	0
3.	(France) Douai	0	0	0	0	0	0	0
4.	(Serbia) WC Zac	0	0	0	0	0	0	0
5.	(Ukraine) Ilyechevets Mariupol	0	0	0	0	0	0	0

==== Group C (Esslingen) ====
	Team	PL	W	D	L	F	A	Pts
1.	(Germany) SSV Esslingen	0	0	0	0	0	0	0
2.	(Hungary) FTC Fisher Clima Budapest	0	0	0	0	0	0	0
3.	(Greece) NOP Patras	0	0	0	0	0	0	0
4.	(Russia) Dinamo SHVSM Moscow	0	0	0	0	0	0	0
5.	(Republic of Ireland) Belfast Wolfhounds	0	0	0	0	0	0	0

==== Group D (Koper) ====
	Team	PL	W	D	L	F	A	Pts
1.	(Italy) RN Florentia	1	1	0	0	12	7	2
2.	(Montenegro) Val Prancj	1	1	0	0	9	6	2
3.	(Greece) AC Paok Thessaloniki	2	0	1	1	19	22	1
4.	(Slovenia) Rokava Koper	2	0	1	1	15	20	1
5.	(Turkey) Orta Dogu Ankara	0	0	0	0	0	0	0

== Knockout rounds ==
=== Round of 16 ===
....
