= Marina Kuč =

Montenegrin swimmer

Personal information
- Full name: Marina Kuč
- National team: Germany; Serbia and Montenegro; Montenegro
- Born: 20 June 1985 (age 41) Essen, Germany,
- Height: 1.77 m (5 ft 10 in)
- Weight: 67 kg (148 lb)

Sport
- Sport: Swimming
- Strokes: Breaststroke
- Club: SG Essen / Düsseldorf SC 1808 (GER)
- Coach: Torsten Petsch (GER)

Marina Kuč (Serbian: Марина Куч; born June 20, 1985, in Essen, Germany) is a former German and Montenegrin swimmer, who specialized in breaststroke events. She is a two-time Olympian (2004 and 2008) and competed in several World- and European Championships. She was member of SG Essen until 2005. From 2005 she competed as a member of Düsseldorf SC 1898 club in Düsseldorf, Germany, under head coach Torsten Petsch. She was the first woman to represent Montenegro at the Olympics.

Kuc was several times German Junior Champ and German Championship medalist and competed for the german national team until she changed to compete for her parents native country Serbia and Montenegro at the European Championship in Madrid and the 2004 Summer Olympics in Athens. In the 100 m breaststroke, she placed twenty-second on the morning prelims. Swimming in heat three, Kuc stormed home with an easy triumph in a time of 1:11.27, holding off Turkey's Ilkay Dikmen by almost half the body length. Three days later, in the 200 m breaststroke, Kuc qualified for the semi-finals with a time of 2:30,39. She finished her semifinal run with a time of 2:31.77.

At the 2008 Summer Olympics in Beijing, Kuc competed in the 200 m breaststroke as a member of the Montenegrin squad, since the nation became a newly independent state in 2006. In 2007, she reached a time of 2:32.59 from the World Championships in Melbourne, Australia to qualify for the 2008 Olympics. She challenged seven other swimmers in heat two, including three-time Olympians Siow Yi Ting of Malaysia and Nicolette Teo of Singapore. She established a time of 2:31.24 to pick up a third seed by a 3.44-second deficit behind winner Siow. Kuc didn't advance in the semifinals, as she placed thirty-first overall in the prelims.
