= VA Cattaro =

Montenegrin water polo club

Vaterpolo akademija Cattaro
- Founded: 2000; 26 years ago
- League: Montenegrin First League; VRL First League
- Based in: Kotor, Serbia
- Championships: 1 Euro Cup

VA Cattaro (full name: Vaterpolo akademija Cattaro) is a professional water polo club and academy based in Kotor, Montenegro. The club was founded in 2000. As of 2026–27 season, it competes in the Montenegrin First League and the regional VRL First League.

== History ==
The first official match of the club's men's team was on October 17, 2008 against the German representative W98/Waspo Hanover, which won with 17: 7, in the qualification tournament for the LEN Euro Cup in the 2008–09 season, and in the end reached the knockout stages, where it was defeated by the Hungarian Szeged. Already in season 2009/10., its second participation in the second-tier European competition, Cattaro has managed to win the LEN Euro Cup. No major problem has passed the first two rounds of the groups that in the quarterfinals defeated Primorje from Rijeka, in the semifinals of the German Spandau 04. Opponent in the final was the Italian club Savona, the first game in Italy ended with 9: 7 for Savona, that in the second leg in Kotor with goal in the overtime Kataro won with 8: 5 and won the first trophy in the club's history. As a 2009-10 LEN Euro Cup winner, Cattaro rightfully played in the European Super Cup against the European Champions Pro Recco from Italy, but was crashed with 13: 4 score.

In the 2009/10 season and 2010/11 the club played in the Adriatic League, the first season was finished in sixth place, while the second, ranked just eleventh. Due to financial difficulties withdrew from the Adriatic League for the 2011/12 season.

== Titles & achievements ==
=== European competitions ===
Euro Cup

- Winners (1): 2009–10

European Super Cup

- Runners-up (1): 2010
