= Montenegrin First League of Water Polo =

Water polo league in Montenegro

First Water Polo League
- Sport: Water polo
- Founded: 2006
- No. of teams: 5 (2024-25)
- Country: Montenegro
- Continent: LEN (Europe)
- Most recent champion: Jadran
- Most titles: Jadran (13 titles in independent Montenegro; 19 overall)
- Broadcaster: RTCG
- Level on pyramid: 1
- Domestic cup: Montenegrin Water Polo Cup
- Website: Official Website

The Montenegrin First League of Water Polo is the national professional water polo league in Montenegro. It was established in 2006, shortly after Montenegro declared its independence from Serbia and Montenegro. It is organized by the Water Polo and Swimming Federation of Montenegro.
Three clubs from Montenegrin League are playing in Adriatic Water Polo League.

== History ==
=== Before independence ===
During their history, Montenegrin water polo clubs played in the top-tier competition of Kingdom of Yugoslavia, SFR Yugoslavia, FR Yugoslavia and Serbia and Montenegro, with important roles in Yugoslav Water Polo Championship. Among them are PVK Jadran, VK Primorac Kotor, VK Budva and VK Bijela, who played in top-tier.
The very first Montenegrin side which participated in official competitions was PVK Jadran, who finished second in 1935 Yugoslav Championship, played in Dubrovnik. First Montenegrin team which played in Yugoslav Championship after the World War II was VK Primorac (season 1946).
Below is the list of all-time participants of Montenegrin clubs in Yugoslav Championship from 1935 to 1938.

Club	35	36	37
Jadran	2	4	3

Below is the list of all-time participants of Montenegrin clubs in Yugoslav First League from 1946 to 1970.

Club	46	51	53	54	55	56	57	58	59	60	61	62	63	64	65	66	67	68	69	70
Primorac	5	-	-	-	-	-	-	-	-	-	-	8	-	-	7	7	8	6	4	4
Jadran	-	7	7	6	6	3	3	1	1	2	2	3	4	4	3	4	4	5	7	9

Below is the list of all-time participants of Montenegrin clubs in Yugoslav First League from 1971 to 1991, including the placements in First 'B' League from 1989 to 1991.

Club	71	72	73	74	75	76	77	78	79	80	81	82	83	84	85	86	87	88	89	90	91
Primorac	6	5	6	5	3	2	4	6	4	3	3	5	4	7	4	1	5	7	6	6	7
Jadran	5	6	9	4	7	8	8	4	6	4	4	4	6	4	8	9	10	9	7	9	12
Bijela	-	-	-	-	-	-	12	-	-	-	-	-	-	-	-	-	-	-	18	19	-
Budva	-	-	-	-	-	-	-	-	-	-	-	-	-	-	-	-	-	-	15	15	19

Below is the list of all-time participants of Montenegrin clubs in First League of FR Yugoslavia / Serbia and Montenegro from 1992 to 2006.

Club	92	93	94	95	96	97	98	99	00	01	02	03	04	05	06
Primorac	4	3	4	7	8	6	5	5	4	4	3	2	3	3	3
Jadran	5	6	6	6	4	5	-	8	3	2	2	1	1	1	1
Budva	-	5	1	2	2	3	4	4	6	7	5	6	6	5	4

In that competitions, Montenegrin clubs won 6 titles of national champion. First time, PVK Jadran became champion of Yugoslavia on season 1957-58. Next year, Jadran defended the trophy. VK Primorac won their first champion title on 1985-86 season. On season 1993-94, champion of Yugoslavia became VK Budva. After two trophies in 50's, PVK Jadran won four champion titles on 2002-03, 2003–04, 2004–05 and 2005-06. Below is the list of Montenegrin clubs' champion titles in the First League of Yugoslavia.

Club	Winners	Runners-up	Winning years
PVK Jadran Herceg Novi	6	4	1957-58, 1958-59, 2002-03, 2003-04, 2004-05, 2005-06
VK Primorac Kotor	1	2	1985-86
VK Budva	1	2	1993-94

=== After independence ===
Soon after the Montenegrin independence referendum, Water polo Federation of Montenegro founded its own competitions, with the First League as a top-tier competition. Number of teams in the First League varied - from 4 to 8.
All the titles in Montenegrin League won three teams - Jadran, Primorac and Budva. Montenegrin clubs are participants of Adriatic Water polo League, too, from its first season.

== Champions ==
From the inaugural season (2006-07), three different clubs won champion titles in Montenegrin First League of Water Polo.

=== Titles by season ===
Montenegrin First League of Water Polo
Season	Champion	Second	Third
2006–07	Primorac	Budva	Jadran
2007–08	Primorac (2)	Budva	Jadran
2008–09	Jadran	Primorac	VA Cattaro
2009–10	Jadran (2)	Primorac	VA Cattaro
2010–11	Budva	Jadran	Primorac
2011–12	Jadran (3)	Budva	Primorac
2012–13	Budva (2)	Primorac	Jadran
2013–14	Jadran (4)	Budva	Primorac
2014–15	Jadran (5)	Budva	Primorac
2015–16	Jadran (6)	Budva	Primorac
2016–17	Jadran (7)	Budva	Primorac
2017–18	Jadran (8)	Budva	Primorac
2018–19	Jadran (9)	Budva	Primorac
2019–20	Interrupted due to the coronavirus pandemic		
2020–21	Jadran (10)	Primorac	Budva
2021–22	Jadran (11)	Primorac	Budva
2022–23	Jadran (12)	Primorac	Budva
2023–24	Primorac (3)	Jadran	VA Cattaro
2024–25	Jadran (13)	Primorac	Budućnost

=== Titles by Club ===
==== Montenegrin League ====
Below is a list of clubs with titles won in Montenegrin First League of Water Polo.

Club	Titles	Runners-up	Years won
Jadran Herceg Novi	13	2	2008-09, 2009–10, 2011–12, 2013–14, 2014–15, 2015–16, 2016-17, 2017-18, 2018-19, 2020-21, 2021-22, 2022-23, 2024-25
Primorac Kotor	3	6	2006-07, 2007–08, 2023-24
Budva	2	9	2010-11, 2012–13

==== Overall ====
Below is an overall list, with titles won in both leagues - Montenegrin League and SFR Yugoslavia / Serbia and Montenegro Championship.

Club	Titles	Runners-up	Years won
Jadran Herceg Novi	19	6	1957-58, 1958–59, 2002–03, 2003–04, 2004–05, 2005–06, 2008–09, 2009–10, 2011–12, 2013–14, 2014–15, 2015-16, 2016-17, 2017-18, 2018-19, 2020-21, 2021-22, 2022-2023, 2024-2025
Primorac Kotor	4	7	1985-86, 2006–07, 2007–08, 2023-24
Budva	3	11	1993-94, 2010–11, 2012–13

== Montenegrin water polo clubs in Adriatic League ==
Clubs from Montenegro were among the founders of Adriatic Water Polo League, which is established at 2008. Since its first season, Montenegrin sides were among the most successful participants of regional competition, and PVK Jadran Herceg Novi won two titles on seasons 2010-11 and 2011-12.
Other clubs from Montenegro which participated in Adriatic League are VK Primorac Kotor, VK Budva and VA Cattaro Kotor.
Below is list of participation of Montenegrin clubs by every season of Adriatic League.

=== Premier League ===
Club	09	10	11	12	13	14	15	16	17	18	19	20	21	22	23	24	25
Jadran	2	1	1	5	8	4	5	3	2	2	2	3	6	5	8	4	3
Primorac	3	3	5	6	9	7	13	-	-	8	8	7	8	8	12	-	7
Budva	5	5	6	10	4	6	11	-	7	9	-	6	12	13	-	-	-
Cattaro	-	6	11	-	-	-	-	-	-	-	-	-	-	-	-	-	-

=== A1 League ===
Club	16	17	18	19	20	22	23	24
Primorac	4	1	-	-	-	-	-	1
Budva	2	-	-	1	-	-	5	11
Cattaro	6	5	8	9	11	5	10	9

== Montenegrin water polo clubs in European competitions ==
Montenegrin water polo clubs are participating in the LEN competitions since the season 1986-97.
First team which ever competed at the European cups was VK Primorac Kotor. Except them, in LEN competitions played also PVK Jadran Herceg Novi, VK Budva, VA Cattaro Kotor and PVK Val Prčanj.
Biggest success in the history of Montenegrin waterpolo made VK Primorac, who won the title in LEN Champions League 2009. Except them, another Montenegrin holder of European trophy is VA Cattaro.
Among the titles which Montenegrin teams won in LEN competitions are:

- LEN Champions League:
  - VK Primorac Kotor: 2009
- LEN Cup:
  - VA Cattaro Kotor: 2010

During the overall history, five different Montenegrin clubs played in LEN competitions.

Team	Seasons	G	W	D	L
PVK Jadran Herceg Novi	16	156	74	23	59
VK Primorac Kotor	15	141	84	7	50
VK Budva	14	124	66	9	49
VA Cattaro Kotor	3	32	22	1	9
PVK Val Prčanj	4	26	8	2	16

As of the end of LEN competitions 2015–16 season.

== See also ==
- Adriatic Water polo League
- Montenegrin Second League of Water Polo
- Montenegrin Water Polo Cup
