= Water Polo and Swimming Federation of Montenegro =

Sports governing body in Montenegro

- Vaterpolo i plivački savez Crne Gore
- Sport: water polo, swimming
- Abbreviation: VPS
- Founded: 1949
- Affiliation: International Swimming Federation (FINA); European Swimming League (LEN)
- Affiliation date: 2006
- Location: Kotor, Montenegro
- President: Dejan Bajić

Official website
- www.wpolo.me

The Water Polo and Swimming Federation of Montenegro (Montenegrin: Vaterpolo i plivački savez Crne Gore, VPS) is the governing body of water polo and swimming in Montenegro. The federation was formed on 22 April 1949 in Herceg Novi. Its first president was Milan Vukasović. It is an independent sports organization, member of the LEN (the European Swimming League), FINA (International Swimming Federation) from 21 August 2006, Montenegrin Olympic Committee. It also organizes the Montenegrin Water Polo Cup as well as the Montenegrin national water polo team.

It is based in Kotor and its current president is Dejan Bajić. Meridianbet is general sponsor of Federation.

== See also ==
- List of Montenegrin records in swimming
