= Montenegrin Water Polo Cup =

National water polo cup played in Montenegro

- Sport: Water polo
- Founded: 2006
- No. of teams: 8
- Country: Montenegro
- Continent: LEN (Europe)
- Most recent champion: Jadran
- Most titles: Jadran (12 titles in independent Montenegro; 15 overall)
- Broadcaster: RTCG
- Website: wpolo.me

Montenegrin Water Polo Cup (Montenegrin: Crnogorski vaterpolski kup) is a national water polo cup played in Montenegro. It is organized by the Water Polo and Swimming Federation of Montenegro.

== History ==
=== Montenegrin clubs in Yugoslav Cup ===
Before Montenegrin independence, clubs from that Republic played in national water polo Yugoslav Cup and Cup of Serbia and Montenegro. The most successful of these was PVK Jadran with three trophies won. VK Primorac won two Yugoslav cups.
Below is a list of Yugoslav Cup trophies won by Montenegrin clubs.

Club	Winners	Runners-up	Winning years
Jadran Herceg Novi	3	4	2003-04, 2004–05, 2005–06
Primorac Kotor	2	2	1985-86, 2002–03
Budva	-	4	

=== Montenegrin Cup (2006-) ===
In addition to the Montenegrin First League of Water Polo as a top-tier league competition, after the independence, the Water Polo Federation of Montenegro established Montenegrin Cup as a second elite national tournament. The inaugural season of Montenegrin Cup was 2006-07, and by now most successful was PVK Jadran with 12 titles (15 including Yugoslav Cup trophies). Except them, trophy of Montenegrin Cup, during the history, won VK Primorac and VK Budva.
From the 2016-17 season, there has been a final-four tournament in Montenegrin Cup. Since then, Nikšić has been the host of final-four tournament three times and Podgorica once.

== Winners and finals ==
=== Season by season ===
Below is a list of final matches of Montenegrin Cup since the season 2006-07.

Year	Winner	Runner-up	Final result
2006–07	Jadran	Budva	7:6, 11:7
2007–08	Jadran (2)	Budva	7:9, 9:6
2008–09	Budva	Primorac	League system
2009–10	Primorac	Budva	8:7
2010–11	Budva (2)	Primorac	10:8, 8:9
2011–12	Jadran (3)	Budva	11:12, 12:10
2012–13	Jadran (4)	Primorac	6:7, 10:8
2013–14	Jadran (5)	Primorac	12:10, 4:6 (4:1)
2014–15	Jadran (6)	Budva	7:5, 7:5
2015–16	Jadran (7)	Budva	17:5, 10:5
2016–17	Jadran (8)	Primorac	9:9 (5:3)
2017–18	Jadran (9)	Budva	12:8
2018–19	Jadran (10)	Budva	12:8
2019–20	Jadran (11)	Budva	9:8
2020–21	Jadran (12)	Primorac	8:6, 12:6
2021–22	Primorac (2)	Jadran	10:9
2022–23	Jadran (13)	Primorac	10:6

=== Titles by Club ===
==== Montenegrin Cup ====
Below is a list of clubs with titles won in Montenegrin Water Polo Cup.

Club	Titles	Runners-up	Years won
Jadran Herceg Novi	13	1	2006–07, 2007–08, 2011–12, 2012–13, 2013–14, 2014–15, 2015–16, 2016–17, 2017–18, 2018–19, 2019–20, 2020–21, 2022–23
Budva	2	9	2008–09, 2010–11
Primorac Kotor	2	7	2009-10, 2021–22

==== Overall ====
Below is an overall list, with titles won in Montenegrin Cup and SFR Yugoslavia / Serbia and Montenegro Cup.

Club	Titles	Runners-up	Years won
Jadran Herceg Novi	16	5	2003–04, 2004–05, 2005–06, 2006–07, 2007–08, 2011–12, 2012–13, 2013–14, 2014–15, 2015–16, 2016–17, 2017–18, 2018–19, 2019–20, 2020–21, 2022–23
Primorac Kotor	4	9	1985–86, 2002–03, 2009–10, 2021–22
Budva	2	13	2008–09, 2010–11

== See also ==
- Montenegrin First League of Water Polo
- Montenegrin Second League of Water Polo
