= VK Budva =

Montenegrin water polo club

- Official logo
- Founded: 1947; 79 years ago
- League: Montenegrin First League; VRL Premier League; Euro Cup
- Based in: Budva, Montenegro
- Website: vkbudva.com

VK Budva (full name: Vaterpolo klub Budva) is a professional water polo club based in Budva, Montenegro. As of 2026–27 season, it competes in the Montenegrin First League, the regional VRL Premier League, and the Euro Cup.

== Names ==
It was formerly known as SD VK Mogren between 1947 and 1992, and as PVK Budvanska Rivijera between 1992 and 2008. In 2008, it changed its name to VK Budva.

== History ==
It was established in 1946. In 2008 VK Budva started to participate in the Adriatic Water Polo League. It played in the Final four of Water Polo Euroleague in 2011 and finished 4th.

== Rosters ==
=== Current squad ===
- (Montenegro) Dejan Lazović 2.00 m
- (Montenegro) Marko Vukmirović 1.86 m
- (Montenegro) Savo Ćetković 1.94 m
- (Montenegro) Bogdan Đurđić 1.84 m
- (Montenegro) Branko Franeta 1.88 m
- (Montenegro) Sergej Lobov 1.92 m
- (Montenegro) Igor Zubac 1.93 m
- (Montenegro) Danilo Dragović 1.74 m
- (Montenegro) Dimitrije Rašković 1.87m
- (Montenegro) Petar Ćetković
- (Croatia) Nikola Milardović

Head coach: (Montenegro) Drago Pejaković

=== Notable players ===
- (Montenegro) Veljko Uskoković
- (Serbia) Aleksandar Ćirić
- (Montenegro) Darko Brguljan
- (Montenegro) Milan Tičić
- (Montenegro) Denis Šefik
- (Montenegro) Nikola Vukčević
- (Montenegro) Dragan Drašković
- (Montenegro) Filip Trajković
- (Montenegro) Predrag Jokić
- (Montenegro) Damjan Danilović
- (Montenegro) Petar Ivošević
- (Serbia) Slavko Gak
- (Serbia) Igor Milanović
- (Serbia) Aleksandar Šoštar
- (Serbia) Goran Rađenović
- (Montenegro) Damir Crepulja
- (Croatia) Marino Franičević
- (Serbia) Petar Trbojević
- (Croatia) Srđan Antonijević
- (Croatia) Fran Paškvalin
- (Montenegro) Aleksandar Radanović
- (Montenegro) Miloš Krivokapić
- (Montenegro) Dragan Vujević
- (United States) Josh Samuels

== Recent seasons ==
=== Rankings in Montenegrin First League ===
P.	07	08	09	10	11	12	13	14	15
1					1		1		
2	2	2				2		2	2
3									
4			4	4					

=== In European competition ===
Season	Competition	Round	Club	Home	Away	Aggregate
