= 2014–15 Prva A liga (men's water polo) =

Prva A liga
- Season: 2014–15
- Champions: Partizan Raiffeisen
- Biggest home win: Banjica 20–8 Singidunum (27 December 2014)
- Biggest away win: Singidunum 5–16 Banjica (7 March 2015)
- Highest scoring: Banjica 20–8 Singidunum (27 December 2014)

The 2014–15 Prva A liga is the 9th season of the Prva A liga, Serbia's premier Water polo league.

== Team information ==
Locations of the 2014-15 Prva A liga

The following 12 clubs compete in the Prva A liga during the 2014–15 season:

Prva A liga
Team	City	Pool	Founded	Colours
Banjica	Belgrade	SC Banjica	2010	
Beograd	Belgrade	SC Tašmajdan	1978	
Crvena zvezda	Belgrade	SC 11. April	1945	
Dunav	Novi Sad	SC Slana bara	2010	
Nais	Niš	SC Čair	2011	
Partizan	Belgrade	SC Banjica	1946	
Radnički	Kragujevac	SC Park	2012	
Singidunum	Belgrade	SC Banjica	2008	
Stari Grad	Belgrade	SC Tašmajdan	2005	
Vojvodina	Novi Sad	SC Slana bara	1935	
Zemun	Zemun	SC 11. April	1992	
ŽAK	Kikinda	SC Jezero	1951	

Teams from Adriatic Water Polo League

== Regular season ==
=== Standings ===
	Team	Pld	W	D	L	GF	GA	Diff	Pts
1	Banjica	14	12	2	0	166	99	+67	38
2	Nais	14	9	2	3	127	95	+32	29
3	Stari Grad	14	9	1	4	133	108	+25	28
4	ŽAK	14	7	1	6	135	124	+11	22
5	Zemun Bosal	14	6	0	8	112	129	−17	18
6	Dunav	14	4	2	8	96	113	−17	14
7	Singidunum	14	4	1	9	90	128	−38	13
8	Beograd	14	0	1	13	99	162	−63	1

Championship Playoff
Relegation Playoff

Pld - Played; W - Won; D - Drawn; L - Lost; GF - Goals for; GA - Goals against; Diff - Difference; Pts - Points.

=== Schedule and results ===
1. round ( 2014.11.29 )
Stari Grad – Banjica	6–6
ŽAK – Singidunum	11–5
Nais – Dunav	6–4
Beograd – Zemun	9–10

2. round ( 2014.12.06 )
Stari Grad – Nais	10–7
Banjica – Zemun	10–7
Singidunum – Beograd	10–5
Dunav – ŽAK	8–8

3. round ( 2014.12.13 )
Zemun – Singidunum	6–5
Beograd – Dunav	4–11
Nais – Banjica	7–7
ŽAK – Stari Grad	12–9

4. round ( 2014.12.27 )
Dunav – Zemun	7–4
Stari Grad – Beograd	15–9
Nais – ŽAK	7–8
Banjica – Singidunum	20–8

5. round ( 2015.01.17 )
Beograd – Nais	6–11
ŽAK – Banjica	8–14
Zemun – Stari Grad	7–10
Singidunum – Dunav	12–7

6. round ( 2015.01.24 )
ŽAK – Beograd	12–5
Banjica – Dunav	17–9
Stari Grad – Singidunum	10–9
Nais – Zemun	14–5

7. round ( 2015.01.31 )
Dunav – Stari Grad	7–10
Singidunum – Nais	4–8
Zemun – ŽAK	10–9
Beograd – Banjica	9–17

8. round ( 2015.02.14 )
Banjica – Stari Grad	9–7
Singidunum – ŽAK	7–6
Dunav – Nais	2–2
Zemun – Beograd	13–11

9. round ( 2015.02.21 )
Nais – Stari Grad	11–6
Zemun – Banjica	5–8
Beograd – Singidunum	9–9
ŽAK – Dunav	11–6

10. round ( 2015.02.28 )
Singidunum – Zemun	6–5
Dunav – Beograd	10–6
Banjica – Nais	12–8
Stari Grad – ŽAK	6–8

11. round ( 2015.03.07 )
Zemun – Dunav	8–5
Beograd – Stari Grad	6–15
ŽAK – Nais	8–11
Singidunum – Banjica	5–16

12. round ( 2015.03.21 )
Nais – Beograd	10–8
Banjica – ŽAK	14–9
Stari Grad – Zemun	7–6
Dunav – Singidunum	5–4

13. round ( 2015.03.28 )
Beograd – ŽAK	7–11
Dunav – Banjica	6–8
Singidunum – Stari Grad	6–9
Zemun – Nais	11–14

14. round ( 2015.04.04 )
Stari Grad – Dunav	13–9
Nais – Singidunum	11–4
ŽAK – Zemun	14–15
Banjica – Beograd	8–5

== Championship playoff ==
Teams in bold won the playoff series. Numbers to the left of each team indicate the team's original playoff seeding. Numbers to the right indicate the score of each playoff game.

Quarterfinals
1	**Radnički**	**16**	**16**
8	ŽAK	10	9
4	**Vojvodina**	5	**11**
5	Banjica	5	6
2	**Partizan Rajfajzen**	**16**	**15**
7	Stari Grad	9	7
3	**Crvena zvezda**	**12**	**18**
6	Nais	6	3

Semifinals
1	**Radnički**	**9**	**9**
4	Vojvodina	4	6
2	**Partizan Rajfajzen**	4	**9**	**11**
3	Crvena zvezda	**9**	7	10

Final
1	Radnički	9	7^{5}	13
2	**Partizan Rajfajzen**	**10**	**7^{6}**	**15**
Third place
3	**Crvena zvezda**	**15**	**15**
4	Vojvodina	6	5

=== Final ===
- **1st leg**

9 May; 18:45 (UTC+2)	Report	Radnički	9–**10**	**Partizan Rajfajzen**	Bazen SC Park, Kragujevac; Attendance: 500; Referees: Rak, Radičević
9 May; 18:45 (UTC+2)	Report	Score by quarters: **3**–2, 1–**3**, 1–**3**, **4**–2			Bazen SC Park, Kragujevac; Attendance: 500; Referees: Rak, Radičević
9 May; 18:45 (UTC+2)	Report	Basara, Miličić, Petković 2	**Goals**	four players 2	Bazen SC Park, Kragujevac; Attendance: 500; Referees: Rak, Radičević

- **2nd leg**

13 May; 18:00 (UTC+2)	Report	**Partizan Rajfajzen**	**13**–12 (OT)	Radnički	Bazen Banjica, Belgrade; Attendance: 500; Referees: Periš, Savinović
13 May; 18:00 (UTC+2)	Report	Score by quarters: **2**–1, 3–3, 0–**2**, **2**–1 OT: pen. **6**–5			Bazen Banjica, Belgrade; Attendance: 500; Referees: Periš, Savinović
13 May; 18:00 (UTC+2)	Report	Mandić 3	**Goals**	Miličić, Petković, Vuksanović 2	Bazen Banjica, Belgrade; Attendance: 500; Referees: Periš, Savinović

- **3rd leg**

16 May; 18:45 (UTC+2)	Report	Radnički	13–**15**	**Partizan Rajfajzen**	Bazen SC Park, Kragujevac; Attendance: 500; Referees: Štampalija, Vlašić
16 May; 18:45 (UTC+2)	Report	Score by quarters: 4–**5**, 1–**2**, **4**–3, 4–**5**			Bazen SC Park, Kragujevac; Attendance: 500; Referees: Štampalija, Vlašić
16 May; 18:45 (UTC+2)	Report	Marković, Petković 3	**Goals**	Mandić 6	Bazen SC Park, Kragujevac; Attendance: 500; Referees: Štampalija, Vlašić

Partizan Rajfajzen won Championship final series 3–0.
