= 2013–14 Prva A liga (men's water polo) =

Prva A liga
- Season: 2013–14
- Champions: Crvena zvezda (4th title)
- Relegated: Dunav
- Champions League: Crvena zvezda Radnički; Partizan
- Euro Cup: Vojvodina; Banjica
- Biggest home win: Crvena zvezda 24–6 ŽAK
- Biggest away win: ŽAK 6–29 Partizan
- Highest scoring: ŽAK 6–29 Partizan

The 2013–14 Prva A liga is the 8th season of the Prva A liga, Serbia's premier Water polo league.

== Team information ==
Locations of the 2013–14 Prva A liga

The following 8 clubs compete in the Prva A liga during the 2013–14 season:

Prva A liga
Team	City	Pool	Founded	Colours
Banjica	Belgrade	SC Banjica	2010	
Crvena zvezda	Belgrade	SRC 11. April	1945	
Dunav	Novi Sad	SC Slana bara	2010	
Nais	Niš	SC Čair	2011	
Partizan	Belgrade	SC Banjica	1946	
Radnički	Kragujevac	SC Park	2012	
Vojvodina	Novi Sad	SC Slana bara	1935	
ŽAK	Kikinda	SC Jezero	1951	

== Regular season ==
=== Standings ===
	Team	Pld	W	D	L	GF	GA	Diff	Pts
1	Crvena zvezda	14	13	0	1	201	84	+127	39
2	Radnički Kragujevac	14	13	0	1	216	82	+134	39
3	Partizan Raiffeisen	14	10	0	4	209	92	+117	30
4	Vojvodina	14	8	0	6	137	145	−8	24
5	Banjica	14	6	0	8	129	154	−25	18
6	ŽAK	14	2	1	11	99	222	−123	7
7	Nais	14	2	1	11	100	167	−67	7
8	Dunav	14	1	0	13	67	212	−148	0

Championship Playoff
relegation play-off

Pld - Played; W - Won; L - Lost; PF - Points for; PA - Points against; Diff - Difference; Pts - Points.

=== Schedule and results ===
1. round
Nais – Crvena zvezda	3–15
Radnički – Partizan	11–8
ŽAK – Vojvodina	8–13
Banjica – Dunav	13–5

2. round
Nais – ŽAK	8–8
Crvena zvezda – Dunav	20–4
Partizan – Banjica	15–6
Vojvodina – Radnički	6–14

3. round
Dunav – Partizan	2–16
Banjica – Vojvodina	6–8
Crvena zvezda – ŽAK	24–6
Radnički – Nais	21–6

4. round
Vojvodina – Dunav	15-2
Nais – Banjica	8-11
ŽAK – Radnički	6-25
Crvena zvezda – Partizan	12-9

5. round
Banjica – ŽAK	14-8
Radnički – Crvena zvezda	8-7
Dunav – Nais	7-13
Partizan – Vojvodina	15-6

6. round
Radnički – Banjica	20–5
Crvena zvezda – Vojvodina	14–9
Nais – Partizan	3–12
ŽAK – Dunav	12–9

7. round
Vojvodina – Nais	11–7
Partizan – ŽAK	7–1
Dunav – Radnički	3–24
Banjica – Crvena zvezda	5–17

8. round
Crvena zvezda – Nais	12–3
Partizan – Radnički	2–9
Vojvodina – ŽAK	13–6
Dunav – Banjica	2–17

9. round
ŽAK – Nais	8–7
Dunav – Crvena zvezda	4–17
Banjica – Partizan	2–14
Radnički – Vojvodina	19–5

10. round
Partizan – Dunav	17–6
Vojvodina – Banjica	13–8
ŽAK – Crvena zvezda	4–12
Nais – Radnički	5–12

11. round
Dunav – Vojvodina	4–12
Banjica – Nais	11–8
Radnički – ŽAK	16–6
Partizan – Crvena zvezda	9–11

12. round
ŽAK – Banjica	11–15
Crvena zvezda – Radnički	10–8
Nais – Dunav	8–5
Vojvodina – Partizan	7–16

13. round
Banjica – Radnički	9–10
Vojvodina – Crvena zvezda	5–15
Partizan – Nais	20–10
ŽAK – Dunav	10–9

14. round
Nais – Vojvodina	11–13
ŽAK – Partizan	6–29
Radnički – Dunav	19–4
Crvena zvezda – Banjica	15–7

== Championship Playoff ==
Teams in bold won the playoff series. Numbers to the left of each team indicate the team's original playoff seeding. Numbers to the right indicate the score of each playoff game.

Semifinals
1	**Crvena zvezda**	**14**	**12**
4	Vojvodina	4	7
2	**Radnički Kragujevac**	**12**	**9**
3	Partizan Raiffeisen	8	6

Final
1	**Crvena zvezda**	**12**	**14**	**12**
2	Radnički Kragujevac	11	13	7
Third place
3	**Partizan Raiffeisen**	**10**	**17**
4	Vojvodina	1	8

=== Semifinals ===
==== 1st leg ====
5 April; 18:45 (UTC+2)	Report	**Crvena zvezda**	**14**–4	Vojvodina	Bazen Vlaho Bata Orlić, Belgrade; Referees: Krstonošić, Vukašinović
5 April; 18:45 (UTC+2)	Report	Score by quarters: 2–1, 2–0, 5–2, 5–1			Bazen Vlaho Bata Orlić, Belgrade; Referees: Krstonošić, Vukašinović
5 April; 18:45 (UTC+2)	Report	Prlainović 3	**Goals**	four players 1	Bazen Vlaho Bata Orlić, Belgrade; Referees: Krstonošić, Vukašinović

5 April; 18:00 (UTC+2)	Report	**Radnički Kragujevac**	**12**–8	Partizan Raiffeisen	Bazen SC Park, Kragujevac; Referees: Ivan Raković, Igor Virijević
5 April; 18:00 (UTC+2)	Report	Score by quarters: 5–3, 3–1, 2–2, 2–2			Bazen SC Park, Kragujevac; Referees: Ivan Raković, Igor Virijević
5 April; 18:00 (UTC+2)	Report	Filipović, Zloković 5	**Goals**	Dedović 5	Bazen SC Park, Kragujevac; Referees: Ivan Raković, Igor Virijević

==== 2nd leg ====
10 April; 18:00 (UTC+2)	Report	Vojvodina	7–**12**	**Crvena zvezda**	Bazen Slana Bara, Novi Sad; Referees: Igor Virijević, Vukašinović
10 April; 18:00 (UTC+2)	Report	Score by quarters: 0–2, 1–4, 2–3, 4–3			Bazen Slana Bara, Novi Sad; Referees: Igor Virijević, Vukašinović
10 April; 18:00 (UTC+2)	Report	Maksimović 4	**Goals**	S. Rašović, V. Rašović 3	Bazen Slana Bara, Novi Sad; Referees: Igor Virijević, Vukašinović

Crvena zvezda won series 2–0 and advanced to Final.

12 April; 18:30 (UTC+2)	Report	Partizan Raiffeisen	6–**9**	**Radnički Kragujevac**	Bazen Banjica, Belgrade; Referees: Putniković, Balažević
12 April; 18:30 (UTC+2)	Report	Score by quarters: 2–2, 2–4, 1–1, 1–2			Bazen Banjica, Belgrade; Referees: Putniković, Balažević
12 April; 18:30 (UTC+2)	Report	Dedović 2	**Goals**	Ćirić, Vuksanović 2	Bazen Banjica, Belgrade; Referees: Putniković, Balažević

Radnički Kragujevac won series 2–0 and advanced to Final.

=== Final ===
==== 1st leg ====
25 April; 18:30 (UTC+2)	Report	**Crvena zvezda**	**12**–11	Radnički Kragujevac	Bazen Tašmajdan, Belgrade; Attendance: 1,600; Referees: Ivan Raković, Putniković
25 April; 18:30 (UTC+2)	Report	Score by quarters: 3–3, 4–2, 1–4, 4–2			Bazen Tašmajdan, Belgrade; Attendance: 1,600; Referees: Ivan Raković, Putniković
25 April; 18:30 (UTC+2)	Report	Prlainović 3	**Goals**	Vuksanović 3	Bazen Tašmajdan, Belgrade; Attendance: 1,600; Referees: Ivan Raković, Putniković

==== 2nd leg ====
30 April; 19:30 (UTC+2)	Report	Radnički Kragujevac	13–**14** (OT)	**Crvena zvezda**	Bazen SC Park, Kragujevac; Attendance: 1,000; Referees: Stefanović, Stanojević
30 April; 19:30 (UTC+2)	Report	Score by quarters: 5–1, 1–3, 3–2, 1–4 OT: 3–4			Bazen SC Park, Kragujevac; Attendance: 1,000; Referees: Stefanović, Stanojević
30 April; 19:30 (UTC+2)	Report	Filipović 6	**Goals**	Vukčević, Vapenski 3	Bazen SC Park, Kragujevac; Attendance: 1,000; Referees: Stefanović, Stanojević

==== 3rd leg ====
10 May; 18:00 (UTC+2)	Report	**Crvena zvezda**	**12**–7	Radnički Kragujevac	Bazen Tašmajdan, Belgrade; Attendance: 1,500; Referees: Putniković, Balažević
10 May; 18:00 (UTC+2)	Report	Score by quarters: 2–1, 4–4, 3–1, 3–1			Bazen Tašmajdan, Belgrade; Attendance: 1,500; Referees: Putniković, Balažević
10 May; 18:00 (UTC+2)	Report	Prlainović 5	**Goals**	Burić, Vuksanović, Filipović 2	Bazen Tašmajdan, Belgrade; Attendance: 1,500; Referees: Putniković, Balažević

Crvena zvezda won Championship final series 3–0.

Prva A liga 2013–14
Champions

**Crvena zvezda**
**4th Title**

Team Roster

1 Denis Šefik, 2 Strahinja Rašović, 3 Nikola Rađen, 4 Petar Ivošević, 5 Filip Kljajević, 6 Nikola Vukčević, 7 Marko Avramović, 8 Viktor Rašović, 9 Sava Ranđelović, 10 Boris Vapenski, 11 Andrija Prlainović, 12 John Mann, 13 Marko Draksimović and 14 Mihajlo Milićević
Coach: Dejan Savić

=== Third Place ===
26 April; 17:30 (UTC+2)	Report	**Partizan Raiffeisen**	**10**–1	Vojvodina	Bazen Banjica, Belgrade; Referees: Milović, Ivanka Raković Krstonošić
26 April; 17:30 (UTC+2)	Report	Score by quarters: 4–0, 2–0, 2–1, 2–0			Bazen Banjica, Belgrade; Referees: Milović, Ivanka Raković Krstonošić
26 April; 17:30 (UTC+2)	Report	Mandić 4	**Goals**	Porobić 1	Bazen Banjica, Belgrade; Referees: Milović, Ivanka Raković Krstonošić

29 April; 18:00 (UTC+2)	Report	Vojvodina	8–**17**	**Partizan Raiffeisen**	Bazen Slana Bara, Novi Sad; Referees: Mišković, Ćirić
29 April; 18:00 (UTC+2)	Report	Score by quarters: 3–6, 2–1, 1–3, 2–7			Bazen Slana Bara, Novi Sad; Referees: Mišković, Ćirić
29 April; 18:00 (UTC+2)	Report	Stojčić 2	**Goals**	Jakšić 3	Bazen Slana Bara, Novi Sad; Referees: Mišković, Ćirić

Partizan Raiffeisen won series 2–0 and won the Third Place
