= 2017 Serbian Water Polo Cup =

Water polo tournament season

2017 Kup Srbije
Tournament details
- Country: Serbia
- Date: 8 November – 17 December 2017
- Teams: 13

Final positions
- Champions: Partizan Raiffeisen (9th title)
- Runner-up: Šabac

The 2017 Serbian Cup is the 12th edition of the tournament.

== Schedule ==
The rounds of the 2017 competition are scheduled as follows:

Round	Matches
Round of 32	8 November 2017
Round of 16	21 November 2017
Quarter-final	2 December 2017
Final four	16–17 December 2017

== Matches ==
Number of teams per tier entering this round
League A	League B	Total
10 / 12	3 / 11	13 / 13

=== Round of 32 ===
Round of 32 match was played on 8 November 2017.

Team 1	Score	Team 2
Nais (A)	14–3	TENT (B)

=== Round of 16 ===
Round of 16 matches were played on 19–22 November 2017.

Team 1	Score	Team 2
Stari grad (A)	17–6	Spartak Prozivka (B)
Beograd (A)	12–14	Valjevo Gorenje (A)
Banjica (A)	4–5	KVK Radnički (A)
Dunav (B)	6–14	Nais (A)

=== Quarter-final ===
Quarter-final matches were played on 1–2 December 2017.

Team 1	Score	Team 2
Partizan Raiffeisen (A)	14–4	Stari grad (A)
Crvena zvezda (A)	19–4	Valjevo Gorenje (A)
Nais (A)	6–6 ^{(5–4 p)}	Vojvodina (A)
Šabac (A)	10–7	KVK Radnički (A)

== Final four ==
The final four will be held on 16 and 17 December 2017 at the SC „Đorđe Predin Badža" in Bečej.

Semi-finals
16 December, 20:30
Partizan Raiffeisen	11
Crvena zvezda	5
16 December, 18:00
Šabac (pen.)	7 (3)
Nais	7 (2)

Final
17 December, 20:30
Partizan Raiffeisen	6
Šabac	5

=== Semi-finals ===
16 December 2017; 20:30 (CET)	Report	Partizan Raiffeisen	11–5	Crvena zvezda	SC „Đorđe Predin Badža", Bečej; Attendance: 800; Referees: Golijanin, Stanojević
16 December 2017; 20:30 (CET)	Report	Score by quarters: 2–1, 1–2, 4–0, 4–2			SC „Đorđe Predin Badža", Bečej; Attendance: 800; Referees: Golijanin, Stanojević
16 December 2017; 20:30 (CET)	Report	Lazić, Tomić, Radonjić 2	Goals	Tankosić 2	SC „Đorđe Predin Badža", Bečej; Attendance: 800; Referees: Golijanin, Stanojević

16 December 2017; 18:00 (CET)	Report	Šabac	7–7 ^{(3–2 PSO)}	Nais	SC „Đorđe Predin Badža", Bečej; Attendance: 300; Referees: Anđelić, Milović
16 December 2017; 18:00 (CET)	Report	Score by quarters: 2–1, 1–1, 1–2, 3–3 PSO: 3–2			SC „Đorđe Predin Badža", Bečej; Attendance: 300; Referees: Anđelić, Milović
16 December 2017; 18:00 (CET)	Report	Repanović 3	Goals	Petrović 4	SC „Đorđe Predin Badža", Bečej; Attendance: 300; Referees: Anđelić, Milović

=== Final ===
17 December 2017; 20:30 (CET)	Report	Partizan Raiffeisen	6–5	Šabac	SC „Đorđe Predin Badža", Bečej; Attendance: 800; Referees: Putniković, Raković
17 December 2017; 20:30 (CET)	Report	Score by quarters: 1–0, 1–2, 2–1, 2–2			SC „Đorđe Predin Badža", Bečej; Attendance: 800; Referees: Putniković, Raković
17 December 2017; 20:30 (CET)	Report	six players 1	Goals	Marković 4	SC „Đorđe Predin Badža", Bečej; Attendance: 800; Referees: Putniković, Raković

2017 Serbian Cup
Winner

Partizan Raiffeisen
26th (9th) title

Rističević – Kasum, F. Janković, Lukić, Lazić, Tomić, M. Janković
Reserves: Andrejević, Manojlović, Radanović, Radonjić, Aksentijević, Belopavlović, Vučinić (goalkeeper)
Head coach
Stefan Ćirić

==== Final standings ====
	Team
	Partizan Raiffeisen
Silver medal	Šabac
Bronze medal	Crvena zvezda
Bronze medal	Nais
