= Denis Šefik =

Serbian-Montenegrin water polo player

Personal information
- Born: 20 September 1976 (age 50) Belgrade, SR Serbia, SFR Yugoslavia
- Height: 198 cm (78 in)
- Weight: 120 kg (265 lb)

Sport
- Sport: Water polo
- Position: Goalkeeper

Senior clubs
- Years: Team
- 1992–1995: Partizan
- 1995–1999: Bečej
- 1999–2000: Partizan
- 2000–2004: Jadran Herceg Novi
- 2004–2005: Partizan
- 2005–2006: Jadran Herceg Novi
- 2006–2007: Ethnikos Piraeus
- 2007–2011: Budva
- 2011–2012: Civitavecchia
- 2012–2015: Crvena Zvezda
- 2015–2016: Radnički Kragujevac
Medal record
Men's water polo
Representing Serbia and Montenegro Serbia
Olympic Games
Silver medal – second place	2004 Athens
Bronze medal – third place	2008 Beijing
World Championship
Gold medal – first place	2005 Montreal
Silver medal – second place	2001 Fukuoka
Bronze medal – third place	2003 Barcelona
European Championship
Gold medal – first place	2001 Budapest
Gold medal – first place	2003 Kranj
Gold medal – first place	2006 Belgrade
Silver medal – second place	2008 Málaga
FINA World League
Gold medal – first place	2005 Belgrade
Gold medal – first place	2006 Athens
Gold medal – first place	2008 Genova
Silver medal – second place	2004 Long Beach
FINA World Cup
Gold medal – first place	2002 Belgrade
Gold medal – first place	2006 Budapest

Denis Šefik (Serbian Cyrillic: Денис Шефик; born 20 September 1976) is a Serbian water polo player who played for VK Radnički. He represented the Serbia and Montenegro national team until 2006, Serbian national team until 2008 and since 2010, represents the Montenegrin national team.

== National team career ==
He was a member of the Serbia and Montenegro team at the 2004 Athens Olympics where they won the silver medal and the Serbian team at the 2008 Beijing Olympics where they won bronze. He competed for the Montenegrin team at the 2012 Summer Olympics, where they came fourth, losing the bronze medal match to Serbia by one point.

== Honours ==
=== Club ===
Crvena Zvezda

- LEN Champions League: 2012–13
- LEN Super Cup: 2013
- Serbian Championship: 2012–13, 2013–14
- Serbian Cup: 2012–13, 2013–14

Budva

- Montenegrin Championship: 2010–11
- Montenegrin Cup: 2008–09, 2010–11

Jadran Herceg Novi

- Serbia & Montenegro Championship: 2002–03, 2003–04, 2005–06
- Serbia & Montenegro Cup: 2003–04, 2005–06

Bečej

- Serbia & Montenegro Championship: 1995–96, 1996–97, 1997–98, 1998–99
- Serbia & Montenegro Cup: 1995–96, 1996–97, 1997–98, 1998–99

Partizan

- Serbia & Montenegro Championship: 1994–95
- Serbia & Montenegro Cup: 1992–93, 1993–94, 1994–95

== Awards ==
- Serbian and Montenegrin Olympic Committee "Athlete of the Year": 2004
- Best Goalkeeper of 2003 European Championship
- Best Goalkeeper of 2006 European Championship
- Best Goalkeeper of 2008 European Championship
- Best Goalkeeper of 2003 World Championship
- Best Goalkeeper of the 2004 Olympic Games in Athens

== See also ==
- Serbia and Montenegro men's Olympic water polo team records and statistics
- Serbia men's Olympic water polo team records and statistics
- Montenegro men's Olympic water polo team records and statistics
- List of Olympic medalists in water polo (men)
- List of men's Olympic water polo tournament goalkeepers
- List of world champions in men's water polo
- List of World Aquatics Championships medalists in water polo

Awards
Preceded by Vladimir Vujasinović	The Best Athlete of Serbia and Montenegro; 2004	Succeeded by Danilo Ikodinović
