= Vanja Udovičić =

Serbian politician and water polo player

- Вања Удовичић
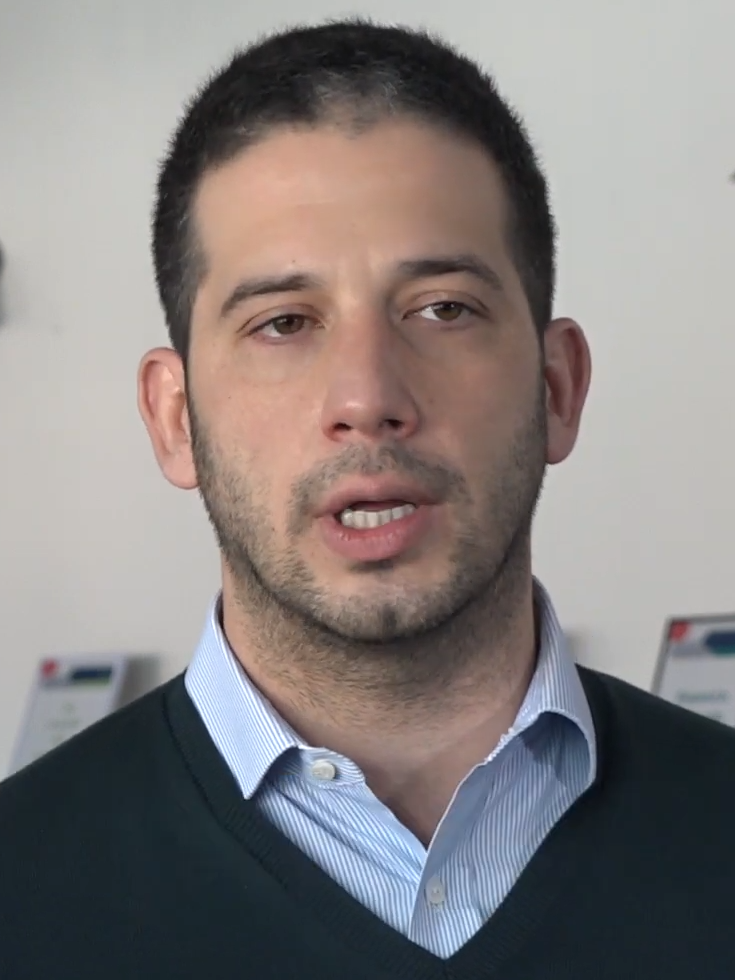
- Udovičić in 2022

Minister of Youth and Sports
- In office 2 September 2013 – 26 October 2022
- Prime Minister: Aleksandar Vučić; Ivica Dačić (acting); Ana Brnabić
- Preceded by: Alisa Marić
- Succeeded by: Zoran Gajić

Personal details
- Born: Franjo Udovičić; 12 September 1982 (age 44) Belgrade, SR Serbia, SFR Yugoslavia
- Citizenship: Serbia; Croatia; Italy
- Party: Independent (Note: Supported by the Serbian Progressive Party)
- Education: University of Belgrade
- Occupation: Politician
- Profession: Water polo player
- Water polo career
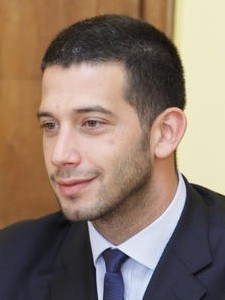
- Nationality: Serbian
- Height: 195 cm (6 ft 5 in)
- Weight: 105 kg (231 lb)
- Sport: Water polo
- Handedness: Right
- Position: Center back

Senior clubs
- Years: Team
- 1998–2003: Partizan Raiffeisen
- 2003–2005: Jadran Herceg Novi
- 2005–2007: Posillipo Naples
- 2007–2010: Pro Recco
- 2010–2012: Mladost Zagreb
- 2012–2013: Radnički Kragujevac
National team
- Years: Team
- 2002–2006: Serbia and Montenegro
- 2006–2013: Serbia
Medal record
Men's water polo
Representing Serbia and Montenegro and Serbia
Olympic Games
Silver medal – second place	2004 Athens
Bronze medal – third place	2008 Beijing
Bronze medal – third place	2012 London
World Championship
Gold medal – first place	2005 Montreal
Gold medal – first place	2009 Rome
Silver medal – second place	2011 Shanghai
Bronze medal – third place	2003 Barcelona
European Championship
Gold medal – first place	2003 Kranj
Gold medal – first place	2006 Belgrade
Gold medal – first place	2012 Eindhoven
Silver medal – second place	2008 Málaga
Bronze medal – third place	2010 Zagreb
FINA World League
Gold medal – first place	2005 Belgrade
Gold medal – first place	2006 Athens
Gold medal – first place	2007 Berlin
Gold medal – first place	2008 Genova
Gold medal – first place	2010 Niš
Gold medal – first place	2011 Firenze
Gold medal – first place	2013 Chelyabinsk
Silver medal – second place	2004 Long Beach
Bronze medal – third place	2009 Podgorica
FINA World Cup
Gold medal – first place	2006 Budapest
Gold medal – first place	2010 Oreada
Bronze medal – third place	2002 Belgrade
Mediterranean Games
Gold medal – first place	2009 Pescara

Vanja Udovičić (Note: Serbian Cyrillic: Вања Удовичић, pronounced [ʋâɲa udɔ̌ʋit͡ʃit͡ɕ]) (born Franjo Udovičić, (Note: Serbian Cyrillic: Фрањо Удовичић, pronounced [frǎːɲo udɔ̌ʋit͡ʃit͡ɕ]) on 12 September 1982) is a Serbian politician and former professional water polo player who served as minister of youth and sports from 2013 to 2022. An independent politician, he is aligned with the Serbian Progressive Party (SNS).

During his professional water polo career that spanned 15 seasons, Udovičić played for Partizan Belgrade, Jadran Herceg Novi, Posillipo Naples, Pro Recco, Mladost Zagreb and Radnički Kragujevac. His most notable achievements at the club level are winning the LEN Euroleague twice with Pro Recco. The first one in 2008 followed by another one in 2010, the final in which he scored 4 goals for his team bringing the title back to Pro Recco with his fellow countryman Filip Filipović contributing 2 goals.

With the Serbian national team, his most notable achievements are European gold for juniors in 2000, the gold medals from the World Championship in 2005 and 2009, European gold in 2003, 2006, and 2012, and Olympic silver in 2004 and bronze in 2008 and 2012.

== Early life ==
Udovičić was born as Franjo Udovičić in Belgrade into an interethnic marriage, to a Croatian-Italian father Davor and a Serbian mother. His paternal grandmother was Italian, thus he also holds an Italian passport. He also has Croatian citizenship. After his parents' divorce, he continued living with his mother in Belgrade, while his father moved back to Istria. Udovičić decided to change his first name to Vanja in 1997 at the age of 15 due to peer harassment that occurred on account of his sharing a first name with the Croatian war-time president Franjo Tuđman.

Udovičić graduated from the University of Belgrade's Faculty of Organizational Sciences.

== Water polo club career ==
Since 2007, Udovičić's been playing defense for Italian club Pro Recco where he arrived after playing two seasons for CN Posillipo from Naples. He started his career in water polo club Partizan from Belgrade and then moved on to VK Jadran from Herceg Novi.

=== PVK Jadran ===
On 23 March 2005 Jadran successfully defended the Serbia-Montenegro national cup title. In the final played over two legs, novljani outplayed crno-beli in the 2nd leg at home thus making up the three goal deficit from the first match in Belgrade. The most responsible for Jadran's success was Udovičić who scored 3 goals, including the last one which secured the trophy. In May, 2005. Jadran took the lead (1–0) in the first match against Partizan in the final play-off state championship series, in their home ground pool in Igalo with a result 8–6. Udovičić scored 2 goals for Jadran. Partizan won the second game, beating Jadran in Belgrade with 6–3 and equalized the final series (1–1) in playoff championship of Serbia and Montenegro. Udovičić didn't score this time. A convincing victory by Jadran in the 3rd play-off game. Jadran from Herceg Novi convincingly beat Partizan Raiffeisen in the third match of the final championship series. Reigning champions won the match in Igalo with a score 14–5. The result of the play-off series was now (2–1) for Jadran, and the title would be won by the first team to reach three wins. After a tied first quarter, the decision was made in the middle period, which Udovičić and his teammates played really unbelievable, scoring 10 and receiving just 2 goals! In those 14 minutes Vladimir Gojković put an end to it, scoring a goal from more than 20 meter distance at the end of the quarter. The best player of the game was of course Vanja Udovičić, who scored 4 goals. Jadran got convincingly to the new national title. Jadran successfully defended the championship of Serbia-Montenegro as they beat Partizan with a 12–4 result. Jadran dominated in the championship play-off series. The final match was played at the sports center precincts of the pool "Banjica" in front of 1.000 spectators. Vanja Udovičić scored 3 goals and helped Jadran in defending the double crown, winning the Cup and the Championship of Serbia and Montenegro for the second consecutive time. Vanja Udovičić was the final play-off series top scorer with 9 goals in four matches.

=== Pro Recco ===
In February 2010. Vanja and his Pro Recco teammate Filipović were guests in Soria. They played an all-stars humanitarian match between Italy and the selection of foreigners playing in the Italian championship, and all proceeds from the match went to charity – to help Haiti, the victims of the recent devastating earthquake. Caps of all players were offered for sale at a symbolic price of 30 euros. On 15 May 2010. Pro Recco played the Euroleague final against VK Primorac. Start of the game was from minus two goals and a bad game in the attack were only one part of Pro Reccos game. The second part was brilliant Radić in Primorac goal. When Tempesti defended the counterattack which would take Primorac to 3–0, it gave strength to Udovičić and his teammates. In the second period, Udovičić and his teammates were better, and at half-time they went to a draw. The second half was much more like a game which adorned Pro Recco during the championship, the Pro Recco dance. The opponent was unable to cope with the Italian defense and Primorac couldn't score a goal in entire second half. Finally, Udovičić led Pro Recco to a new European title scoring 4 goals!

In June 2010 after winning the Euroleague, and earlier the Italian Cup, Pro Recco has won the championship play off series against Savona 3–0. Udovičić has contributed in the final with 2 goals, celebrating Pro Reccos 24th National Championship title.

=== HAVK Mladost ===
Following the 2010 European Championship that was held in Zagreb, the representatives of local club and record 7 times LEN Euroleague champions HAVK Mladost approached Udovičić about joining their club. Numerous clubs also approached Udovičić in a desire to sign him, including Partizan Belgrade, Olympiacos, Jug, Savona, Spartak, Jadran, Budva and Vojvodina. On 16 September 2010, he was unveiled as the Mladost new acquisition on a one-year contract. With the number 7 cap, according to unofficial information, he would earn about 120.000 euros. On his press conference, he stated: "Arrival in Mladost is a major challenge, this is the most successful European club that has a huge rating in the European water polo. I'm glad we agreed on the conditions and I hope to be fit as soon as possible so I can give the club what is expected of me." Vanja was named "Athlete of the Year" by the LEN magazine in November. He came in first place with 59% of votes in front of Damir Burić with 29% and Stefano Tempesti 12%. The three of them all together won the LEN Euroleague with Pro Recco in 2010. He got the first trophy with Mladost in December 2010 winning the National Cup of Croatia. Mladost played against Primorje EB in the final defeating them 10–7. Udovičić was the top scorer in his team with 3 goals. Vanja was offered a new contract in May 2011. which he didn't sign immediately. Beside the Zagrebs club offer, there were two other serious contenders for his engagement. Italians first division teams CN Posillipo and Savona. In August 2011. it was confirmed that Udovičić would stay and play at least one more season for Mladost. Contract details were confidential but it was assumed that his new contract was worth about 130.000 euros per season.

==== 2011–12 season ====
On 17 September 2011. Udovičić scored three goals in the 12–9 win first round of the Adriatic League against Šibenik. On 5 October in the third round of the Adriatic League, Udovičić scored four goals against POŠK in a big 18–8 home win. On 8 October, in the fourth round of the Adriatic League, Udovičić scored two goals in a 10–10 tie with VK Jadran HN. On 15 October Mladost lost at home 10–5 to VK Jug CO in the fifth round of the Adriatic League. Vanja managed to score just one goal. On 22 October Vanja Udovičić scored a goal for Mladost in the first round of the Euroleague Group in which his team won by 14–9 against VK Vojvodina in Zagreb. On 29 October Udovičić scored two goals in a 13–9 defeat by Pro Recco, in the seventh round of Adriatic League. On 5 November Udovičić scored four goals in a 13–10 hard win over Budva M:tel, in the Adriatic League eighth round. Vanja Udovičić scored his 17th Adriatic League goal on 11 November, in the ninth round 14–9 away win against Primorac. On 19 November Udovičić scored two goals in a 9–8 win against Mornar BS in the tenth round of the Adriatic League. Vanja scored his 20th Adriatic League goal on 3 December, in the twelfth round 14–6 easy win against VK Medveščak. On 14 December 2011, Vanja scored two goals in a 9–3 win against Spandau 04 in Berlin, in the fourth round of the Euroleague Group. In the Adriatic League fourteenth round, on 4 February, Udovičić scored two goals in a 13–8 home lose to Primorje EB. On 8 February 2012, Vanja scored a goal in a 6–7 loss to VK Jug in Zagreb, in the fifth round of the Euroleague Group. On 11 February Udovičić scored three goals against Mornar BS in 14–7 away win. This was the fifteenth round of the Adriatic League. He was the top scorer with four goals on 18 February in the 13–8 Adriatic League home win against Jadran HN. On 25 February, in the sixth round of the Euroleague Group Udovičić scored two goals in an 11–10 away win over VK Vojvodina. On 3 March, in the Adriatic League seventeenth round Mladost lost to Pro Recco at home by 7–12. Vanja managed to score a goal.

== National team ==
In June 2010, Pro Recco club leadership served Udovičić with an ultimatum in an effort to force him into switching his national team allegiance and start playing for the Italian national team. He refused, choosing to continue playing for the Serbian national team. As a result, Pro Recco terminated his contract. His decision to remain loyal to his country of birth resulted in a wave of positive reaction in the Serbian press, while Serbian Water Polo Association president Velibor Sovrović publicly thanked Udovičić for refusing to cave in to the Italian pressure.

=== 300 ===
On 9 January 2012 Vanja with his national team took part in the Samaridis Cup which is held in Greece on the island of Chios. In the first round he and his national team lost to Spain with the result in the end 11–10 for Spain. He scored one goal for his team. But, in the second round on 10 January, Vanja scored three goals which took his team to victory over Montenegro, 7–6. He was the best and most effective player of the match, but the thing he will remember the meeting for is that the first goal he scored was his 300th for the national team. Scoring 302 goals for his national team, Udovičić surpassed Danilo Ikodinović on the list of the Serbia men's national water polo team best shooters of all time. He stand's alone now in 5th place. In the final round of the tournament on 11 January against Greece, Udovičić didn't participate because of illness. His team eventually won the game by 8–3 but finished as runner's up behind Montenegro on a goal difference.

=== 2012 Eindhoven ===
On 16 January, at the European Championship, Udovičić scored in the first game three goals in an 8–5 win against Spain. On 17 January, Udovičić scored two goals against Germany in a very difficult victory for his national team, 13–12. On 19 January, in another difficult game against the defending European champions Croatia, Udovičić finished the match as the top scorer of his team with three goals in a 15–12 win. On 21 January in the fourth match, Udovičić scored two goals for his national team in a routine victory against Romania 14–5. On 23 January, Udovičić scored a goal in the last round of group A, which Serbia lost to Montenegro with 11–7. On 27 January Udovičić scored two goals in a semifinal 12–8 victory over Italy. Vanja Udovičić won the 2012 European Championship on 29 January. He scored two goals in the final against Montenegro which his national team won by 9–8. This was his third gold medal at the European Championships.

== Honours ==
=== Club ===
VK Partizan

- National Championship of Yugoslavia (1): 2001–02
- National Cup of Yugoslavia (1): 2001–02

PVK Jadran

- National Championship os Serbia & Montenegro (2): 2003–04, 2004–05
- National Cup of Serbia & Montenegro (2): 2003–04, 2004–05

Circolo Nautico Posillipo

- LEN Supercup (1): 2005–06

Pro Recco

- Serie A1 (3): 2007–08, 2008–09, 2009–10
- Coppa Italia (2): 2007–08, 2008–09
- LEN Euroleague (2): 2007–08, 2009–10
- LEN Supercup (2): 2006–07, 2007–08

Mladost Zagreb

- National Cup of Croatia (2): 2010–11, 2011–12

VK Radnički Kragujevac

- LEN Trophy (1): 2012–13

=== Individual ===
- National Championship of Italy Top Scorer (1): 2007, 2010
- FINA World League MVP (2): 2007 Berlin, 2010 Niš
- FINA World League Top Scorer (1): 2013 Čeljabinsk
- World Championship MVP (1): 2009 Rome
- MVP Foreigner in National Championship of Italy (1): 2009
- LEN Euroleague Final Four MVP (1): 2010 Naples
- FINA World Cup MVP (1): 2010 Oreada
- European Championship MVP (1): 2010 Zagreb
- European Championship Top Scorer (1): 2010 Zagreb
- LEN "European Player of the Year" award (1): 2010
- FINA "World Player of the Year" award (1): 2010
- Best Male Sports Team of the year in Zagreb (1): 2011 (with HAVK Mladost)
- Serbia's sport association "May Award" : 2010

== See also ==
- Serbia men's Olympic water polo team records and statistics
- Serbia and Montenegro men's Olympic water polo team records and statistics
- List of Olympic medalists in water polo (men)
- List of world champions in men's water polo
- List of World Aquatics Championships medalists in water polo

== Notes ==
Government offices
Preceded by Alisa Marić	Minister of Youth and Sports of Serbia; 2013–present	Incumbent
Sporting positions
Preceded by Vladimir Vujasinović	Serbia captain 2009–2013	Succeeded by Živko Gocić
Awards
Preceded by (Spain) Guillermo Molina	Most Valuable Player of Water Polo World Championship; 2009	Succeeded by (Serbia) Filip Filipović
Preceded by (Hungary) Péter Biros	Most Valuable Player of Water Polo European Championship; 2010	Succeeded by (Montenegro) Mlađan Janović
Preceded by First award	FINA Water Polo Player of the Year; 2010	Succeeded by (Serbia) Filip Filipović
