= Serbia men's Olympic water polo team records and statistics =

This article lists various water polo records and statistics in relation to the Serbia men's national water polo team at the Summer Olympics.

The Serbia men's national water polo team has participated in 4 of 27 official men's water polo tournaments.

== Abbreviations ==
Apps	Appearances	Rk	Rank	Ref	Reference	Cap No.	Water polo cap number
Pos	Playing position	FP	Field player	GK	Goalkeeper	ISHOF	International Swimming Hall of Fame
L/R	Handedness	L	Left-handed	R	Right-handed	Oly debut	Olympic debut in water polo
(C)	Captain	p.	page	pp.	pages		

== Team statistics ==
=== Comprehensive results by tournament ===
Notes:

- Results of Olympic qualification tournaments are not included. Numbers refer to the final placing of each team at the respective Games.
- At the 1904 Summer Olympics, a water polo tournament was contested, but only American contestants participated. Currently the International Olympic Committee (IOC) and the International Swimming Federation (FINA) consider water polo event as part of unofficial program in 1904.
- Related teams: Yugoslavia men's Olympic water polo team^{†} (statistics), FR Yugoslavia men's Olympic water polo team^{†} (Note: After the breakup of Yugoslavia, FR Yugoslavia men's national water polo team participated at the 1996 and 2000 Olympics, and won a bronze medal in 2000. In 2003, after the country was renamed from FR Yugoslavia to Serbia and Montenegro, the team was also renamed to "Serbia and Montenegro men's national water polo team".) (statistics), Serbia and Montenegro men's Olympic water polo team^{†} (statistics).
- Last updated: 8 August 2021.

Legend

- 1 – Champions
- 2 – Runners-up
- 3 – Third place
- 4 – Fourth place
- — – The nation did not participate in the Games
- Q – Qualified for forthcoming tournament
- Team^{†} – Defunct team

Abbreviation

- FRY – FR Yugoslavia
- SCG – Serbia and Montenegro

Men's team	00	04	08	12	20	24	28	32	36	48	52	56	60	64	68	72	76	80	84	88	92	96	00	04	08	12	16	20	24	Years
Serbia	—	—	—		Part of Yugoslavia																P. of FRY / SCG				3	3	1	1	1	5
Yugoslavia^{†}	—	—	—	—					10	9	2	2	4	2	1	5	5	2	1	1	Defunct									12
Yugoslavia^{†}	—	—	—	—	Part of Yugoslavia																—	8	3	Defunct						2
Serbia and Montenegro^{†}	—	—	—	—	Part of Yugoslavia																See FRY			2	Defunct					1
Total teams	7		4	6	12	13	14	5	16	18	21	10	16	13	15	16	12	12	12	12	12	12	12	12	12	12	12	12	12	

=== Number of appearances ===
Last updated: 11 August 2024.

Men's team	Apps	Record streak	Active streak	Debut	Most recent	Best finish	Confederation
Serbia	5	5	5	2008	2024	Champions	Europe – LEN

=== Best finishes ===
Last updated: 11 August 2024.

Men's team	Best finish	Apps	Confederation
Serbia	Champions (2016, 2020, 2024)	5	Europe – LEN

=== Finishes in the top four ===
Last updated: 11 August 2024.

Men's team	Total	Champions	Runners-up	Third place	Fourth place	First	Last
Serbia	5	3 (2016, 2020, 2024)		2 (2008, 2012)		2008	2024

=== Medal table ===
Last updated: 11 August 2024.

Men's team	Gold	Silver	Bronze	Total
Serbia (SRB)	3	0	2	5

== Player statistics ==
=== Multiple appearances ===
The following table is pre-sorted by number of Olympic appearances (in descending order), year of the last Olympic appearance (in ascending order), year of the first Olympic appearance (in ascending order), date of birth (in ascending order), name of the player (in ascending order), respectively.

- Number of five-time Olympians: 0
- Number of four-time Olympians: 7
- Last updated: 8 August 2021.

Abbreviation

- FRY – FR Yugoslavia
- SCG – Serbia and Montenegro
- SRB – Serbia

Male athletes who competed in water polo at four or more Olympics
Apps	Player	Birth	Pos	Water polo tournaments					Age of first/last	ISHOF member	Note	Ref
Apps	Player	Birth	Pos	1	2	3	4	5	Age of first/last	ISHOF member	Note	Ref
4	Vladimir Vujasinović	1973	FP	1996; FRY	2000; FRY	2004; SCG	2008; SRB		22/35			
4	Dejan Savić	1975	FP	1996; FRY	2000; FRY	2004; SCG	2008; SRB		21/33			
4	Aleksandar Šapić	1978	FP	1996; FRY	2000; FRY	2004; SCG	2008; SRB		18/30			
4	Duško Pijetlović	1985	FP	2008	2012	2016	2020		23/36			
4	Andrija Prlainović	1987	FP	2008	2012	2016	2020		21/34			
4	Filip Filipović	1987	FP	2008	2012	2016	2020		21/34		Flag bearer for Serbia (2020)	
4	Dušan Mandić	1994	FP	2012	2016	2020	2024		18/30			

=== Multiple medalists ===
The following table is pre-sorted by total number of Olympic medals (in descending order), number of Olympic gold medals (in descending order), number of Olympic silver medals (in descending order), year of receiving the last Olympic medal (in ascending order), year of receiving the first Olympic medal (in ascending order), name of the player (in ascending order), respectively.

- Number of four-time Olympic medalists: 4
- Number of three-time Olympic medalists: 13
- Last updated: 11 August 2024.

Abbreviation

- FRY – FR Yugoslavia
- SCG – Serbia and Montenegro
- SRB – Serbia

Male athletes who won three or more Olympic medals in water polo
Rk	Player	Birth	Height	Pos	Water polo tournaments					Period (age of first/last)	Medals				Ref
Rk	Player	Birth	Height	Pos	1	2	3	4	5	Period (age of first/last)	G	S	B	T	Ref
1	Dušan Mandić	1994	2.02 m (6 ft 8 in)	FP	2012	2016	2020	2024		12 years (18/30)	3	0	1	4	
2	Filip Filipović	1987	1.96 m (6 ft 5 in)	FP	2008	2012	2016	2020		13 years (21/34)	2	0	2	4	
2	Duško Pijetlović	1985	1.97 m (6 ft 6 in)	FP	2008	2012	2016	2020		13 years (23/36)	2	0	2	4	
2	Andrija Prlainović	1987	1.87 m (6 ft 2 in)	FP	2008	2012	2016	2020		13 years (21/34)	2	0	2	4	
5	Nikola Jakšić	1997	1.96 m (6 ft 5 in)	FP	2016	2020	2024			8 years (19/27)	3	0	0	3	
5	Sava Ranđelović	1993	1.93 m (6 ft 4 in)	FP	2016	2020	2024			8 years (23/31)	3	0	0	3	
7	Milan Aleksić	1986	1.93 m (6 ft 4 in)	FP	2012	2016	2020			9 years (26/35)	2	0	1	3	
7	Stefan Mitrović	1988	1.95 m (6 ft 5 in)	FP	2012	2016	2020			9 years (24/33)	2	0	1	3	
7	Gojko Pijetlović	1983	1.94 m (6 ft 4 in)	GK	2012	2016	2020			9 years (29/38)	2	0	1	3	
4	Slobodan Nikić	1983	1.97 m (6 ft 6 in)	FP	2004; SCG		2012; SRB	2016; SRB		12 years (21/33)	1	1	1	3	
9	Živko Gocić	1982	1.93 m (6 ft 4 in)	FP	2008	2012	2016			8 years (25/33)	1	0	2	3	
10	Aleksandar Ćirić	1977	1.92 m (6 ft 4 in)	FP	2000; FRY	2004; SCG	2008; SRB			8 years (22/30)	0	1	2	3	
10	Aleksandar Šapić	1978	1.88 m (6 ft 2 in)	FP	1996; FRY	2000; FRY	2004; SCG	2008; SRB		12 years (18/30)	0	1	2	3	
10	Dejan Savić	1975	1.90 m (6 ft 3 in)	FP	1996; FRY	2000; FRY	2004; SCG	2008; SRB		12 years (21/33)	0	1	2	3	
10	Vladimir Vujasinović	1973	1.87 m (6 ft 2 in)	FP	1996; FRY	2000; FRY	2004; SCG	2008; SRB		12 years (22/34)	0	1	2	3	
10	Vanja Udovičić	1982	1.93 m (6 ft 4 in)	FP	2004; SCG	2008; SRB	2012; SRB			8 years (21/29)	0	1	2	3	
Rk	Player	Birth	Height	Pos	1	2	3	4	5	Period (age of first/last)	G	S	B	T	Ref
Rk	Player	Birth	Height	Pos	Water polo tournaments					Period (age of first/last)	Medals				Ref

=== Top goalscorers ===
The following table is pre-sorted by number of total goals (in descending order), year of the last Olympic appearance (in ascending order), year of the first Olympic appearance (in ascending order), name of the player (in ascending order), respectively.

- Number of goalscorers (50+ goals): 1
- Number of goalscorers (40–49 goals): 1
- Number of goalscorers (30–39 goals): 2
- Last updated: 1 April 2021.

Abbreviation

- FRY – FR Yugoslavia
- SCG – Serbia and Montenegro
- SRB – Serbia

Male players with 30 or more goals at the Olympics
Rk	Player	Birth	L/R	Total goals	Water polo tournaments (goals)					Age of first/last	ISHOF member	Note	Ref
Rk	Player	Birth	L/R	Total goals	1	2	3	4	5	Age of first/last	ISHOF member	Note	Ref
1	Aleksandar Šapić	1978	Right	64	1996; FRY (8)	2000; FRY (18)	2004; SCG (18)	2008; SRB (20)		18/30			
2	Filip Filipović	1987	Left	41	2008 (4)	2012 (18)	2016 (19)			21/29			
3	Vladimir Vujasinović	1973	Right	34	1996; FRY (14)	2000; FRY (5)	2004; SCG (3)	2008; SRB (12)		22/35			
4	Andrija Prlainović	1987	Right	31	2008 (4)	2012 (22)	2016 (5)			21/29			

Sources:

- Official Reports (PDF): 1996;
- Official Results Books (PDF): 2000 (pp. 46, 50, 56, 78, 83, 85, 88, 92), 2004 (pp. 223–224), 2008 (pp. 211–212), 2012 (pp. 494–495), 2016 (pp. 131–132).

=== Goalkeepers ===
The following table is pre-sorted by edition of the Olympics (in ascending order), cap number or name of the goalkeeper (in ascending order), respectively.

Last updated: 11 August 2024.

Abbreviation

- Eff % – Save efficiency (Saves / Shots)

Year	Cap No.	Goalkeeper	Birth	Age	Saves	Shots	Eff %	ISHOF member	Note	Ref
2008 (bronze)	1	Denis Šefik (2)	1976	31	22	43	51.2%			
2008 (bronze)	13	Slobodan Soro	1978	29	57	93	61.3%		Starting goalkeeper	
2012 (bronze)	1	Slobodan Soro (2)	1978	33	75	135	55.6%		Starting goalkeeper	
2012 (bronze)	13	Gojko Pijetlović	1983	29	11	17	64.7%			
2016 (gold)	1	Gojko Pijetlović (2)	1983	33	14	21	66.7%			
2016 (gold)	13	Branislav Mitrović	1985	31	60	119	50.4%		Starting goalkeeper	
2020 (gold)	1	Gojko Pijetlović (3)	1983	38	19	38	50.0%			
2020 (gold)	13	Branislav Mitrović (2)	1985	36	70	122	57.4%		Starting goalkeeper	
2024 (gold)	1	Radoslav Filipović	1997	27	59	143	41.3%		Starting goalkeeper	
2024 (gold)	13	Vladimir Mišović	2001	23	6	13	46.2%			
Year	Cap No.	Goalkeeper	Birth	Age	Saves	Shots	Eff %	ISHOF member	Note	Ref

- Official Results Books (PDF): 2008 (pp. 211–212), 2012 (pp. 494–495), 2016 (pp. 131–132).

Notes:

- Denis Šefik is also listed in Serbia and Montenegro men's Olympic water polo team records and statistics, and Montenegro men's Olympic water polo team records and statistics.
- Slobodan Soro is also listed in Brazil men's Olympic water polo team records and statistics.

=== Top sprinters ===
The following table is pre-sorted by number of total sprints won (in descending order), year of the last Olympic appearance (in ascending order), year of the first Olympic appearance (in ascending order), name of the sprinter (in ascending order), respectively.

* Number of sprinters (30+ sprints won, since 2000): 1

- Number of sprinters (20–29 sprints won, since 2000): 0
- Number of sprinters (10–19 sprints won, since 2000): 1
- Number of sprinters (5–9 sprints won, since 2000): 4
- Last updated: 15 May 2021.

Abbreviation

- Eff % – Efficiency (Sprints won / Sprints contested)
- FRY – FR Yugoslavia
- SCG – Serbia and Montenegro
- SRB – Serbia

Male players with 5 or more sprints won at the Olympics (statistics since 2000)
Rk	Sprinter	Birth	Total sprints won	Total sprints contested	Eff %	Water polo tournaments (sprints won / contested)					Age of first/last	ISHOF member	Note	Ref
Rk	Sprinter	Birth	Total sprints won	Total sprints contested	Eff %	1	2	3	4	5	Age of first/last	ISHOF member	Note	Ref
1	Aleksandar Ćirić	1977	40	56	71.4%	2000; FRY (17/24)	2004; SCG (14/20)	2008; SRB (9/12)			22/30			
2	Filip Filipović	1987	10	22	45.5%	2008 (8/15)	2012 (2/6)	2016 (0/1)			21/29			
3	Aleksa Šaponjić	1992	7	11	63.6%	2012 (7/11)					20/20			
3	Stefan Mitrović	1988	7	20	35.0%	2012 (3/8)	2016 (4/12)				24/28			
5	Živko Gocić	1982	6	19	31.6%	2008 (1/4)	2012 (2/7)	2016 (3/8)			26/33			
6	Miloš Ćuk	1990	5	11	45.5%	2016 (5/11)					25/25			

- Official Results Books (PDF): 2000 (pp. 46, 50, 56, 78, 83, 85, 88, 92), 2004 (pp. 223–224), 2008 (pp. 211–212), 2012 (pp. 494–495), 2016 (pp. 131–132).

== Coach statistics ==
=== Medals as coach and player ===
The following table is pre-sorted by total number of Olympic medals (in descending order), number of Olympic gold medals (in descending order), number of Olympic silver medals (in descending order), year of winning the last Olympic medal (in ascending order), year of winning the first Olympic medal (in ascending order), name of the person (in ascending order), respectively. Last updated: 11 August 2024.

As a water polo player, Dejan Savić won three consecutive Olympic medals between 2000 and 2008. At the 2016 Summer Games in Rio de Janeiro, he coached Serbia men's national team to the Olympic title.

Rk	Person	Birth	Height	Player				Head coach			Total medals				Ref
Rk	Person	Birth	Height	Age	Men's team	Pos	Medal	Age	Men's team	Medal	G	S	B	T	Ref
1	Dejan Savić	1975	1.90 m (6 ft 3 in)	25	Yugoslavia	FP	2000 (bronze)	41	Serbia	2016 (gold)	2	1	2	5	
1	Dejan Savić	1975	1.90 m (6 ft 3 in)	29	Serbia and Montenegro	FP	2004 (silver)	41	Serbia	2016 (gold)	2	1	2	5	
1	Dejan Savić	1975	1.90 m (6 ft 3 in)	33	Serbia	FP	2008 (bronze)	46	Serbia	2020 (gold)	2	1	2	5	

== Olympic champions ==
=== 2016 Summer Olympics ===
- Edition of men's tournament: 27th
- Host city: Rio de Janeiro, Brazil
- Number of participating teams: 12
- Competition format: Round-robin pools advanced teams to classification matches
- Champion: Serbia (1st title; 4th place in preliminary A group)

Results
Match	Round	Date	Cap color	Opponent	Result	Goals for	Goals against	Goal diff.
Match 1/8	Preliminary round – Group A	6 August 2016	White	Hungary	Drawn	13	13	0
Match 2/8	Preliminary round – Group A	8 August 2016	White	Greece	Drawn	9	9	0
Match 3/8	Preliminary round – Group A	10 August 2016	Blue	Brazil	Lost	5	6	–1
Match 4/8	Preliminary round – Group A	12 August 2016	White	Australia	Won	10	8	2
Match 5/8	Preliminary round – Group A	14 August 2016	White	Japan	Won	12	8	4
Match 6/8	Quarter-finals	16 August 2016	White	Spain	Won	10	7	3
Match 7/8	Semi-finals	18 August 2016	Blue	Italy	Won	10	8	2
Match 8/8	Gold medal match (gold)	20 August 2016	Blue	Croatia	Won	11	7	4
Total	Matches played: 8 • Wins: 5 • Ties: 2 • Defeats: 1 • Win %: 62.5%					80	66	14

Source: Official Results Books (PDF): 2016 (pp. 9, 21, 37, 53, 65, 75, 83, 91).

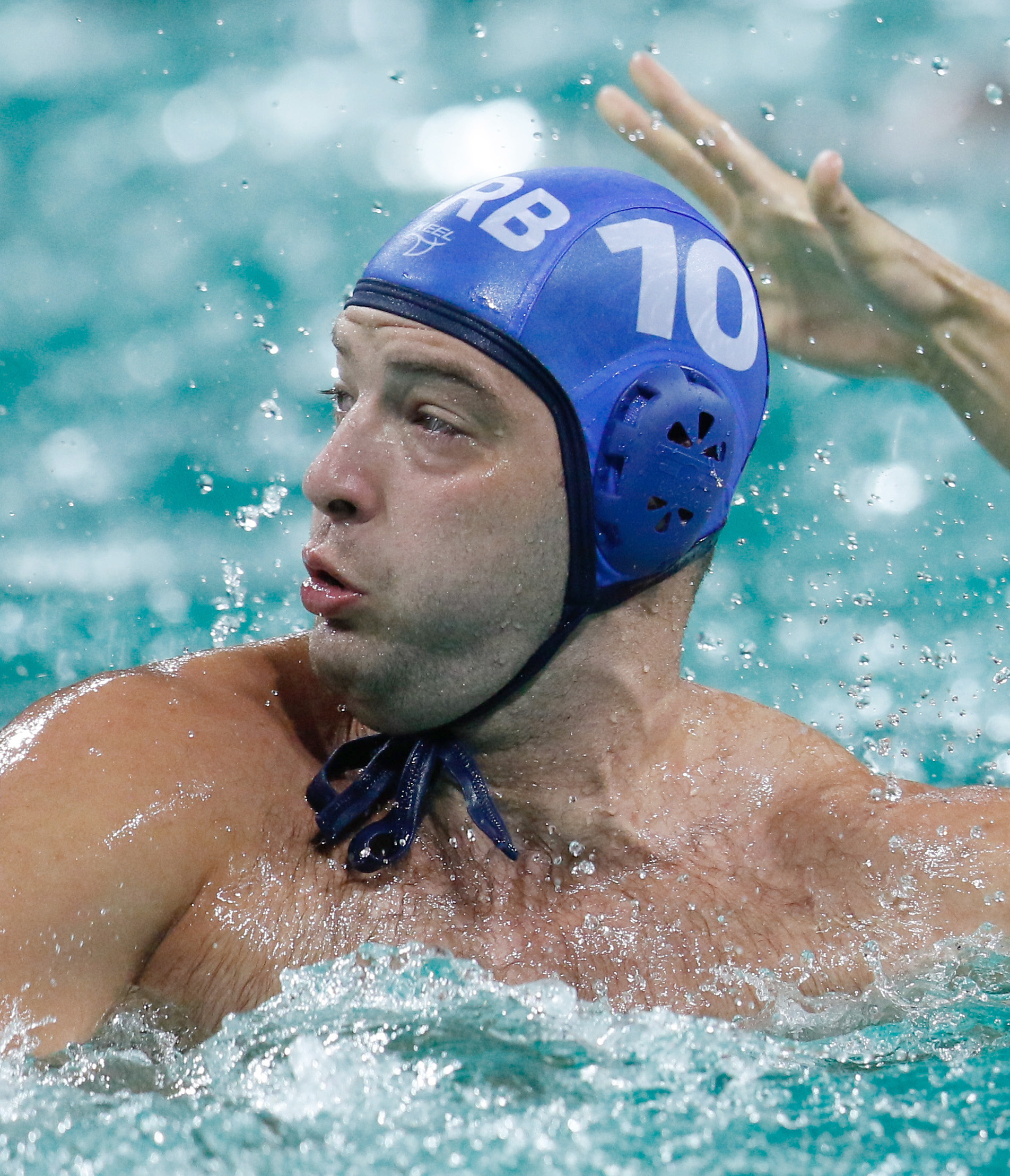
Filip Filipović scored 19 goals at the 2016 Olympics, helping Serbia win gold. He was named the Most Valuable Player of the men's water polo tournament.

- Head coach: (Serbia) Dejan Savić (1st title as head coach)
- Assistant coaches: (Serbia) Stefan Ćirić, (Serbia) Vladimir Vujasinović

Roster
Cap No.	Player	Pos	L/R	Height	Weight	Date of birth	Age of winning gold	Oly debut	ISHOF member
1	Gojko Pijetlović	GK	R	1.94 m (6 ft 4 in)	92 kg (203 lb)	7 August 1983	33 years, 13 days	No	
2	Dušan Mandić	FP	L	2.02 m (6 ft 8 in)	105 kg (231 lb)	16 June 1994	22 years, 65 days	No	
3	Živko Gocić (C)	FP	R	1.93 m (6 ft 4 in)	93 kg (205 lb)	22 August 1982	33 years, 364 days	No	
4	Sava Ranđelović	FP	R	1.93 m (6 ft 4 in)	98 kg (216 lb)	17 July 1993	23 years, 34 days	Yes	
5	Miloš Ćuk	FP	R	1.91 m (6 ft 3 in)	91 kg (201 lb)	21 December 1990	25 years, 243 days	Yes	
6	Duško Pijetlović	FP	R	1.97 m (6 ft 6 in)	97 kg (214 lb)	25 April 1985	31 years, 117 days	No	
7	Slobodan Nikić	FP	R	1.97 m (6 ft 6 in)	106 kg (234 lb)	25 January 1983	33 years, 208 days	No	
8	Milan Aleksić	FP	R	1.93 m (6 ft 4 in)	96 kg (212 lb)	13 May 1986	30 years, 99 days	No	
9	Nikola Jakšić	FP	R	1.97 m (6 ft 6 in)	89 kg (196 lb)	17 January 1997	19 years, 216 days	Yes	
10	Filip Filipović	FP	L	1.96 m (6 ft 5 in)	101 kg (223 lb)	2 May 1987	29 years, 110 days	No	
11	Andrija Prlainović	FP	R	1.87 m (6 ft 2 in)	93 kg (205 lb)	28 April 1987	29 years, 114 days	No	
12	Stefan Mitrović	FP	R	1.95 m (6 ft 5 in)	91 kg (201 lb)	29 March 1988	28 years, 144 days	No	
13	Branislav Mitrović	GK	R	2.01 m (6 ft 7 in)	100 kg (220 lb)	30 January 1985	31 years, 203 days	Yes	
Average				1.95 m (6 ft 5 in)	96 kg (212 lb)	28 January 1988	28 years, 205 days		
Coach	Dejan Savić			1.90 m (6 ft 3 in)		24 April 1975	41 years, 118 days		

Note: Duško Pijetlović and Gojko Pijetlović are brothers.
Sources:

- Official Results Books (PDF): 2016 (p. 132);
- ISHOF.

Abbreviation

- MP – Matches played
- Min – Minutes
- G – Goals
- Sh – Shots
- AS – Assists
- TF – Turnover fouls
- ST – Steals
- BL – Blocked shots
- SP – Sprints
- 20S – 20 seconds exclusion
- DE – Double exclusion
- Pen – Penalty
- EX – Exclusion

Statistics
Cap No.	Player	Pos	MP	Minutes played		Goals/Shots			AS	TF	ST	BL	Sprints			Personal fouls			
Cap No.	Player	Pos	MP	Min	%	G	Sh	%	AS	TF	ST	BL	Won	SP	%	20S	DE	Pen	EX
1	Gojko Pijetlović	GK	8	32	12.5%						1								
2	Dušan Mandić	FP	8	170	66.4%	12	24	50.0%	4	10	1	6				6			
3	Živko Gocić (C)	FP	8	156	60.9%	2	12	16.7%	3	3	3	3	3	8	37.5%	11			
4	Sava Ranđelović	FP	8	60	23.4%	2	4	50.0%		2	4	2				13		1	1
5	Miloš Ćuk	FP	8	122	47.7%	6	21	28.6%	1	4	3	2	5	11	45.5%	4		1	1
6	Duško Pijetlović	FP	8	129	50.4%	8	16	50.0%	1	17		2				11			1
7	Slobodan Nikić	FP	8	115	44.9%	10	20	50.0%	1	13	1	2				4			
8	Milan Aleksić	FP	8	134	52.3%	4	13	30.8%	4	6	5	3				11		1	2
9	Nikola Jakšić	FP	8	88	34.4%	4	7	57.1%		4	2	2				13		1	2
10	Filip Filipović	FP	8	178	69.5%	19	44	43.2%	7	9	6	6	0	1	0.0%	7			
11	Andrija Prlainović	FP	8	210	82.0%	5	25	20.0%	6	5	5	5				9	1	1	2
12	Stefan Mitrović	FP	8	174	68.0%	8	26	30.8%	1	10	4	7	4	12	33.3%	3			
13	Branislav Mitrović	GK	8	224	87.5%						11								
Team										3									
Total			8	256	100%	80	212	37.7%	28	86	46	40	12	32	37.5%	92	1	5	9
Against						66	216	30.6%	24	102	47	22	20	32	62.5%	82	1	4	7

Cap No.	Player	Pos	Saves/Shots		
Cap No.	Player	Pos	Saves	Shots	%
1	Gojko Pijetlović	GK	14	21	66.7%
13	Branislav Mitrović	GK	60	119	50.4%
Total			74	140	52.9%

Source: Official Results Books (PDF): 2016 (p. 131).

== Water polo people at the opening and closing ceremonies ==
=== Flag bearers ===
Some sportspeople were chosen to carry the national flag of their country at the opening and closing ceremonies of the Olympic Games. As of the 2020 Summer Olympics, one male water polo player was given the honour to carry the flag for Serbia.

Legend

- 2008 O – Opening ceremony of the 2008 Summer Olympics
- 2012 C – Closing ceremony of the 2012 Summer Olympics
- Flag bearer^{‡} – Flag bearer who won the tournament with his team

Water polo people who were flag bearers at the opening and closing ceremonies of the Olympic Games
#	Year	Country	Flag bearer	Birth	Age	Height	Team	Pos	Water polo tournaments					Period (age of first/last)	Medals				Ref
#	Year	Country	Flag bearer	Birth	Age	Height	Team	Pos	1	2	3	4	5	Period (age of first/last)	G	S	B	T	Ref
1	2020 O	Serbia	Filip Filipović^{‡}	1987	34	1.96 m (6 ft 5 in)	Serbia	FP	2008	2012	2016	2020		13 years (21/34)	2	0	2	4	

== See also ==
- Yugoslavia men's Olympic water polo team records and statistics
- Serbia and Montenegro men's Olympic water polo team records and statistics
- List of men's Olympic water polo tournament records and statistics
- Lists of Olympic water polo records and statistics
- Serbia at the Olympics

== Sources ==
=== Official Reports (IOC) ===
PDF documents in the LA84 Foundation Digital Library:

- Official Report of the 1896 Olympic Games (download, archive)
- Official Report of the 1900 Olympic Games (download, archive)
- Official Report of the 1904 Olympic Games (download, archive)
- Official Report of the 1908 Olympic Games (download, archive) (pp. 359–361)
- Official Report of the 1912 Olympic Games (download, archive) (pp. 1021–1024, 1031–1037)
- Official Report of the 1920 Olympic Games (download, archive) (p. 130)
- Official Report of the 1924 Olympic Games (download, archive) (pp. 439–440, 486–494)
- Official Report of the 1928 Olympic Games (download, archive) (pp. 746–757, 797–807)
- Official Report of the 1932 Olympic Games (download, archive) (pp. 619–623, 646–652)
- Official Report of the 1936 Olympic Games, v.2 (download, archive) (pp. 345–356)
- Official Report of the 1948 Olympic Games (download, archive) (pp. 537–540, 640–647)
- Official Report of the 1952 Olympic Games (download, archive) (pp. 600–608)
- Official Report of the 1956 Olympic Games (download, archive) (pp. 592–594, 624–627)
- Official Report of the 1960 Olympic Games (download, archive) (pp. 552–555, 617–634)
- Official Report of the 1964 Olympic Games, v.2 (download, archive) (pp. 682–698)
- Official Report of the 1968 Olympic Games, v.3 (download, archive) (pp. 449–466, 811–826)
- Official Report of the 1972 Olympic Games, v.3 (download, archive) (pp. 331, 353–365)
- Official Report of the 1976 Olympic Games, v.3 (download, archive) (pp. 446–447, 484–497)
- Official Report of the 1980 Olympic Games, v.3 (download, archive) (pp. 458, 495–510)
- Official Report of the 1984 Olympic Games, v.2 (download, archive) (pp. 528–534)
- Official Report of the 1988 Olympic Games, v.2 (download, archive) (pp. 590–598)
- Official Report of the 1992 Olympic Games, v.5 (download, archive) (pp. 354, 386–400)
- Official Report of the 1996 Olympic Games, v.3 (download, archive) (pp. 56–73)

=== Official Results Books (IOC) ===
PDF documents in the LA84 Foundation Digital Library:

- Official Results Book – 2000 Olympic Games – Water Polo (download, archive)
- Official Results Book – 2004 Olympic Games – Water Polo (download, archive)
- Official Results Book – 2008 Olympic Games – Water Polo (download, archive)

PDF documents on the FINA website:

- Official Results Book – 2012 Olympic Games – Diving, Swimming, Synchronised Swimming, Water Polo (archive) (pp. 284–507)

PDF documents in the Olympic World Library:

- Official Results Book – 2016 Olympic Games – Water Polo (archive)

PDF documents on the International Olympic Committee website:

- Official Results Book – 2020 Olympic Games – Water Polo (archive)
- Official Results Book – 2024 Olympic Games – Water Polo

=== Official Reports (FINA) ===
PDF documents on the FINA website:

- HistoFINA – Water polo medalists and statistics (as of September 2019) (archive) (pp. 4–13)
- 1870–2020 | 150 years of Water Polo – Evolution of its rules (archive)

=== Official website (IOC) ===
Water polo on the International Olympic Committee website:

- Water polo
- Men's water polo

=== Olympedia ===
Water polo on the Olympedia website:

- Water polo Archived 2021-12-28 at the Wayback Machine
- Men's water polo
- Athlete count for water polo
- Water polo venues
- Water polo at the 1900 Summer Olympics (men's tournament)
- Water polo at the 1904 Summer Olympics (men's tournament)
- Water polo at the 1908 Summer Olympics (men's tournament)
- Water polo at the 1912 Summer Olympics (men's tournament)
- Water polo at the 1920 Summer Olympics (men's tournament)
- Water polo at the 1924 Summer Olympics (men's tournament)
- Water polo at the 1928 Summer Olympics (men's tournament)
- Water polo at the 1932 Summer Olympics (men's tournament)
- Water polo at the 1936 Summer Olympics (men's tournament)
- Water polo at the 1948 Summer Olympics (men's tournament)
- Water polo at the 1952 Summer Olympics (men's tournament)
- Water polo at the 1956 Summer Olympics (men's tournament)
- Water polo at the 1960 Summer Olympics (men's tournament)
- Water polo at the 1964 Summer Olympics (men's tournament)
- Water polo at the 1968 Summer Olympics (men's tournament)
- Water polo at the 1972 Summer Olympics (men's tournament)
- Water polo at the 1976 Summer Olympics (men's tournament)
- Water polo at the 1980 Summer Olympics (men's tournament)
- Water polo at the 1984 Summer Olympics (men's tournament)
- Water polo at the 1988 Summer Olympics (men's tournament)
- Water polo at the 1992 Summer Olympics (men's tournament)
- Water polo at the 1996 Summer Olympics (men's tournament)
- Water polo at the 2000 Summer Olympics (men's tournament)
- Water polo at the 2004 Summer Olympics (men's tournament)
- Water polo at the 2008 Summer Olympics (men's tournament)
- Water polo at the 2012 Summer Olympics (men's tournament)
- Water polo at the 2016 Summer Olympics (men's tournament)
- Water polo at the 2020 Summer Olympics (men's tournament)

=== Sports Reference ===
Water polo on the Sports Reference website:

- Country Medal Leaders & Athlete Medal Leaders (1900–2016) (archived)
- Men's water polo (1900–2016) (archived)
- Water polo at the 1900 Summer Games (men's tournament) (archived)
- Water polo at the 1904 Summer Games (men's tournament) (archived)
- Water polo at the 1908 Summer Games (men's tournament) (archived)
- Water polo at the 1912 Summer Games (men's tournament) (archived)
- Water polo at the 1920 Summer Games (men's tournament) (archived)
- Water polo at the 1924 Summer Games (men's tournament) (archived)
- Water polo at the 1928 Summer Games (men's tournament) (archived)
- Water polo at the 1932 Summer Games (men's tournament) (archived)
- Water polo at the 1936 Summer Games (men's tournament) (archived)
- Water polo at the 1948 Summer Games (men's tournament) (archived)
- Water polo at the 1952 Summer Games (men's tournament) (archived)
- Water polo at the 1956 Summer Games (men's tournament) (archived)
- Water polo at the 1960 Summer Games (men's tournament) (archived)
- Water polo at the 1964 Summer Games (men's tournament) (archived)
- Water polo at the 1968 Summer Games (men's tournament) (archived)
- Water polo at the 1972 Summer Games (men's tournament) (archived)
- Water polo at the 1976 Summer Games (men's tournament) (archived)
- Water polo at the 1980 Summer Games (men's tournament) (archived)
- Water polo at the 1984 Summer Games (men's tournament) (archived)
- Water polo at the 1988 Summer Games (men's tournament) (archived)
- Water polo at the 1992 Summer Games (men's tournament) (archived)
- Water polo at the 1996 Summer Games (men's tournament) (archived)
- Water polo at the 2000 Summer Games (men's tournament) (archived)
- Water polo at the 2004 Summer Games (men's tournament) (archived)
- Water polo at the 2008 Summer Games (men's tournament) (archived)
- Water polo at the 2012 Summer Games (men's tournament) (archived)
- Water polo at the 2016 Summer Games (men's tournament) (archived)
- Water polo at the 2020 Summer Games (men's tournament) (archived)

=== Todor66 ===
Water polo on the Todor66 website:

- Water polo at the Summer Games
- Water polo at the 1900 Summer Olympics (men's tournament)
- Water polo at the 1904 Summer Olympics (men's tournament)
- Water polo at the 1908 Summer Olympics (men's tournament)
- Water polo at the 1912 Summer Olympics (men's tournament)
- Water polo at the 1920 Summer Olympics (men's tournament)
- Water polo at the 1924 Summer Olympics (men's tournament)
- Water polo at the 1928 Summer Olympics (men's tournament)
- Water polo at the 1932 Summer Olympics (men's tournament)
- Water polo at the 1936 Summer Olympics (men's tournament)
- Water polo at the 1948 Summer Olympics (men's tournament)
- Water polo at the 1952 Summer Olympics (men's tournament)
- Water polo at the 1956 Summer Olympics (men's tournament)
- Water polo at the 1960 Summer Olympics (men's tournament)
- Water polo at the 1964 Summer Olympics (men's tournament)
- Water polo at the 1968 Summer Olympics (men's tournament, men's qualification)
- Water polo at the 1972 Summer Olympics (men's tournament, men's qualification)
- Water polo at the 1976 Summer Olympics (men's tournament, men's European qualification)
- Water polo at the 1980 Summer Olympics (men's tournament, men's European qualification, men's world qualification)
- Water polo at the 1984 Summer Olympics (men's tournament, men's qualification)
- Water polo at the 1988 Summer Olympics (men's tournament, men's qualification)
- Water polo at the 1992 Summer Olympics (men's tournament, men's qualification)
- Water polo at the 1996 Summer Olympics (men's tournament, men's qualification)
- Water polo at the 2000 Summer Olympics (men's tournament, men's qualification)
- Water polo at the 2004 Summer Olympics (men's tournament, men's qualification)
- Water polo at the 2008 Summer Olympics (men's tournament, men's qualification)
- Water polo at the 2012 Summer Olympics (men's tournament, men's qualification)
- Water polo at the 2016 Summer Olympics (men's tournament, men's qualification)
- Water polo at the 2020 Summer Olympics (men's tournament, men's qualification)
- Water polo at the 2024 Summer Olympics (men's tournament, men's qualification)

=== ISHOF ===
International Swimming Hall of Fame (ISHOF) website:

- Honorees Listed by Category – Water Polo
- Honorees Listed by Category – Coaches
- Honorees Listed by Category – Contributors
- Honorees by Country
- Honorees By Last Name
