= Serbian Water Polo Cup =

National water polo cup of Serbia

- Sport: Water polo
- Founded: 2006
- No. of teams: 14
- Country: Serbia (2006–present)
- Most recent champions: Novi Beograd (3rd title) (2025–26)
- Most titles: Partizan (9 titles)
- Website: waterpoloserbia.org (in Serbian)

The Serbian Water Polo Cup (Serbian: Куп Србије у ватерполу / Kup Srbije u vaterpolu) is the national water polo cup of Serbia. It is run by the Water Polo Federation of Serbia (Serbian: Ватерполо савез Србије / Vaterpolo savez Srbije).

== Winners ==
- 2006–07 to present: Serbian Water Polo Cup

Season	Winner	Result	Runner-up
2006–07*	Partizan Raiffeisen	1st with 32 pts	Student
2007–08	Partizan Raiffeisen	15–6	Crvena zvezda
2008–09	Partizan Raiffeisen	10–7	Vojvodina OTP
2009–10	Partizan Raiffeisen	8–4	Vojvodina
2010–11	Partizan Raiffeisen	11–8	Vojvodina
2011–12	Partizan Raiffeisen	12–7	Crvena zvezda VET
2012–13	Crvena zvezda	9–8	Partizan Raiffeisen
2013–14	Crvena zvezda	12–11	Radnički Kragujevac Kon Tiki
2014–15	Radnički Kragujevac Kon Tiki	5–4	Partizan Raiffeisen
2015–16	Partizan Raiffeisen	11–9	Radnički Kragujevac Kon Tiki
2016–17	Partizan Raiffeisen	8–5	Crvena zvezda
2017–18	Partizan Raiffeisen	6–5	Šabac
2018–19	Šabac	10–9	Radnički Kragujevac
2019–20	Radnički Kragujevac	10–8	Šabac
2020–21	Crvena zvezda	13–12	Radnički Kragujevac
2021–22	Radnički Kragujevac	11–9	Novi Beograd
2022–23	Crvena zvezda	11–10	Novi Beograd
2023–24	Novi Beograd	18–15	Crvena zvezda
2024–25	Novi Beograd	7–6	Crvena zvezda
2025–26	Novi Beograd	12–7	Šabac

_{*The 2006–07 season in Water polo Cup of Serbia were played without playoff phase.}

== Performance by club ==
Club	Titles	Years won	Runner-up	Years runner-up
Partizan	9	2007, 2008, 2009, 2010, 2011, 2012, 2016, 2017, 2018	2	2013, 2015
Crvena zvezda	4	2013, 2014, 2021, 2023	5	2008, 2012, 2017, 2024, 2025
Radnički	3	2015, 2020, 2022	4	2014, 2016, 2019, 2021
Novi Beograd	3	2024, 2025, 2026	2	2022, 2023
Šabac	1	2019	3	2018, 2020, 2026
Vojvodina	0		3	2009, 2010, 2011
Banjica	0		1	2007

== All-time Cup winners (Yugoslavia, Serbia&Montenegro, present day Serbia) ==
Total number of national cups won by Serbian clubs. Table includes titles won during the Yugoslav Water Polo Cup (1972–1992) and Serbia and Montenegro Water Polo Cup (1992–2006) as well.

Club	Titles	Years won
Partizan	26	1973, 1974, 1975, 1976, 1978, 1979, 1982, 1985, 1987, 1988, 1990, 1991, 1992, 1993, 1994, 1995, 2002, 2007, 2008, 2009, 2010, 2011, 2012, 2016, 2017, 2018
Bečej	6	1996, 1997, 1998, 1999, 2000, 2001
Crvena zvezda	4	2013, 2014, 2021, 2023
Novi Beograd	3	2024, 2025, 2026
Radnički	3	2015, 2020, 2022
Šabac	1	2019

== See also ==
- Serbian Water Polo Super League
