= Serbia and Montenegro men's Olympic water polo team records and statistics =

This article lists various water polo records and statistics in relation to the FR Yugoslavia men's national water polo team and the Serbia and Montenegro men's national water polo team at the Summer Olympics.

The FR Yugoslavia men's national water polo team and the Serbia and Montenegro men's national water polo team have participated in 3 of 27 official men's water polo tournaments.

== Abbreviations ==
Apps	Appearances	Rk	Rank	Ref	Reference	Cap No.	Water polo cap number
Pos	Playing position	FP	Field player	GK	Goalkeeper	ISHOF	International Swimming Hall of Fame
L/R	Handedness	L	Left-handed	R	Right-handed	Oly debut	Olympic debut in water polo
(C)	Captain	p.	page	pp.	pages		

== Team statistics ==
=== Comprehensive results by tournament ===
Notes:

- Results of Olympic qualification tournaments are not included. Numbers refer to the final placing of each team at the respective Games.
- At the 1904 Summer Olympics, a water polo tournament was contested, but only American contestants participated. Currently the International Olympic Committee (IOC) and the International Swimming Federation (FINA) consider water polo event as part of unofficial program in 1904.
- Related teams: Yugoslavia men's Olympic water polo team^{†} (statistics), FR Yugoslavia men's Olympic water polo team^{†}, (Note: After the breakup of Yugoslavia, FR Yugoslavia men's national water polo team participated at the 1996 and 2000 Olympics, and won a bronze medal in 2000. In 2003, after the country was renamed from FR Yugoslavia to Serbia and Montenegro, the team was also renamed to "Serbia and Montenegro men's national water polo team".) Montenegro men's Olympic water polo team (statistics), Serbia men's Olympic water polo team (statistics).
- Last updated: 5 May 2021.

Legend

- 1 – Champions
- 2 – Runners-up
- 3 – Third place
- 4 – Fourth place
- — – The nation did not participate in the Games
- Q – Qualified for forthcoming tournament
- Team^{†} – Defunct team

Abbreviation

- FRY – FR Yugoslavia
- SCG – Serbia and Montenegro

Men's team	00	04	08	12	20	24	28	32	36	48	52	56	60	64	68	72	76	80	84	88	92	96	00	04	08	12	16	20	Years
Yugoslavia^{†}	—	—	—	—	Part of Yugoslavia																—	8	3	Defunct					2
Serbia and Montenegro^{†}	—	—	—	—	Part of Yugoslavia																See FRY			2	Defunct				1
Yugoslavia^{†}	—	—	—	—					10	9	2	2	4	2	1	5	5	2	1	1	Defunct								12
Montenegro	—	—	—	—	Part of Yugoslavia																P. of FRY / SCG				4	4	4	Q	4
Serbia	—	—	—		Part of Yugoslavia																P. of FRY / SCG				3	3	1	Q	4
Total teams	7		4	6	12	13	14	5	16	18	21	10	16	13	15	16	12	12	12	12	12	12	12	12	12	12	12	12	

=== Number of appearances ===
Last updated: 5 May 2021.

Legend

- Team^{†} – Defunct team

Men's team	Apps	Record streak	Active streak	Debut	Most recent	Best finish	Confederation
Yugoslavia^{†}	2	2	0	1996	2000	Third place	Europe – LEN
Serbia and Montenegro^{†}	1	1	0	2004	2004	Runners-up	Europe – LEN

=== Best finishes ===
Last updated: 5 May 2021.

Legend

- Team^{†} – Defunct team

Men's team	Best finish	Apps	Confederation
Serbia and Montenegro^{†}	Runners-up (2004)	1	Europe – LEN
Yugoslavia^{†}	Third place (2000)	2	Europe – LEN

=== Finishes in the top four ===
Last updated: 5 May 2021.

Legend

- Team^{†} – Defunct team

Men's team	Total	Champions	Runners-up	Third place	Fourth place	First	Last
Serbia and Montenegro^{†}	1		1 (2004)			2004	2004
Yugoslavia^{†}	1			1 (2000)		2000	2000

=== Medal table ===
Last updated: 5 May 2021.

Legend

- Team^{†} – Defunct team

Men's team	Gold	Silver	Bronze	Total
Serbia and Montenegro (SCG)^{†}	0	1	0	1
Yugoslavia (FRY)^{†}	0	0	1	1
Totals (2 entries)	0	1	1	2

== Player statistics ==
=== Multiple appearances ===
The following table is pre-sorted by number of Olympic appearances (in descending order), year of the last Olympic appearance (in ascending order), year of the first Olympic appearance (in ascending order), date of birth (in ascending order), name of the player (in ascending order), respectively.

- Number of five-time Olympians: 0
- Number of four-time Olympians: 4
- Last updated: 5 May 2021.

Abbreviation

- FRY – FR Yugoslavia
- MNE – Montenegro
- SCG – Serbia and Montenegro
- SRB – Serbia

Male athletes who competed in water polo at four or more Olympics
Apps	Player	Birth	Pos	Water polo tournaments					Age of first/last	ISHOF member	Note	Ref
Apps	Player	Birth	Pos	1	2	3	4	5	Age of first/last	ISHOF member	Note	Ref
4	Vladimir Vujasinović	1973	FP	1996; FRY	2000; FRY	2004; SCG	2008; SRB		22/35			
4	Dejan Savić	1975	FP	1996; FRY	2000; FRY	2004; SCG	2008; SRB		21/33			
4	Aleksandar Šapić	1978	FP	1996; FRY	2000; FRY	2004; SCG	2008; SRB		18/30			
4	Predrag Jokić	1983	FP	2004; SCG	2008; MNE	2012; MNE	2016; MNE		21/33		Flag bearer for Montenegro (2016)	

Notes:

- Predrag Jokić is also listed in Montenegro men's Olympic water polo team records and statistics.
- Aleksandar Šapić is also listed in Serbia men's Olympic water polo team records and statistics.
- Dejan Savić is also listed in Serbia men's Olympic water polo team records and statistics.
- Vladimir Vujasinović is also listed in Serbia men's Olympic water polo team records and statistics.

=== Multiple medalists ===
The following table is pre-sorted by total number of Olympic medals (in descending order), number of Olympic gold medals (in descending order), number of Olympic silver medals (in descending order), year of receiving the last Olympic medal (in ascending order), year of receiving the first Olympic medal (in ascending order), name of the player (in ascending order), respectively.

- Number of five-time Olympic medalists: 0
- Number of four-time Olympic medalists: 0
- Number of three-time Olympic medalists: 6
- Last updated: 5 May 2021.

Abbreviation

- FRY – FR Yugoslavia
- SCG – Serbia and Montenegro
- SRB – Serbia

Male athletes who won three or more Olympic medals in water polo
Rk	Player	Birth	Height	Pos	Water polo tournaments					Period (age of first/last)	Medals				Ref
Rk	Player	Birth	Height	Pos	1	2	3	4	5	Period (age of first/last)	G	S	B	T	Ref
1	Slobodan Nikić	1983	1.97 m (6 ft 6 in)	FP	2004; SCG		2012; SRB	2016; SRB		12 years (21/33)	1	1	1	3	
2	Aleksandar Ćirić	1977	1.92 m (6 ft 4 in)	FP	2000; FRY	2004; SCG	2008; SRB			8 years (22/30)	0	1	2	3	
2	Aleksandar Šapić	1978	1.88 m (6 ft 2 in)	FP	1996; FRY	2000; FRY	2004; SCG	2008; SRB		12 years (18/30)	0	1	2	3	
2	Dejan Savić	1975	1.90 m (6 ft 3 in)	FP	1996; FRY	2000; FRY	2004; SCG	2008; SRB		12 years (21/33)	0	1	2	3	
2	Vladimir Vujasinović	1973	1.87 m (6 ft 2 in)	FP	1996; FRY	2000; FRY	2004; SCG	2008; SRB		12 years (22/34)	0	1	2	3	
2	Vanja Udovičić	1982	1.93 m (6 ft 4 in)	FP	2004; SCG	2008; SRB	2012; SRB			8 years (21/29)	0	1	2	3	

Notes:

- Aleksandar Ćirić is also listed in Serbia men's Olympic water polo team records and statistics.
- Slobodan Nikić is also listed in Serbia men's Olympic water polo team records and statistics.
- Aleksandar Šapić is also listed in Serbia men's Olympic water polo team records and statistics.
- Dejan Savić is also listed in Serbia men's Olympic water polo team records and statistics.
- Vanja Udovičić is also listed in Serbia men's Olympic water polo team records and statistics.
- Vladimir Vujasinović is also listed in Serbia men's Olympic water polo team records and statistics.

=== Top goalscorers ===
The following table is pre-sorted by number of total goals (in descending order), year of the last Olympic appearance (in ascending order), year of the first Olympic appearance (in ascending order), name of the player (in ascending order), respectively.

- Number of goalscorers (50+ goals): 1
- Number of goalscorers (40–49 goals): 0
- Number of goalscorers (30–39 goals): 1
- Last updated: 5 May 2021.

Abbreviation

- FRY – FR Yugoslavia
- SCG – Serbia and Montenegro
- SRB – Serbia

Male players with 30 or more goals at the Olympics
Rk	Player	Birth	L/R	Total goals	Water polo tournaments (goals)					Age of first/last	ISHOF member	Note	Ref
Rk	Player	Birth	L/R	Total goals	1	2	3	4	5	Age of first/last	ISHOF member	Note	Ref
1	Aleksandar Šapić	1978	Right	64	1996; FRY (8)	2000; FRY (18)	2004; SCG (18)	2008; SRB (20)		18/30			
2	Vladimir Vujasinović	1973	Right	34	1996; FRY (14)	2000; FRY (5)	2004; SCG (3)	2008; SRB (12)		22/35			

Sources:

- Official Reports (PDF): 1996;
- Official Results Books (PDF): 2000 (pp. 46, 50, 56, 78, 83, 85, 88, 92), 2004 (pp. 223–224), 2008 (pp. 211–212).

Notes:

- Aleksandar Šapić is also listed in Serbia men's Olympic water polo team records and statistics.
- Vladimir Vujasinović is also listed in Serbia men's Olympic water polo team records and statistics.

=== Goalkeepers ===
The following table is pre-sorted by edition of the Olympics (in ascending order), cap number or name of the goalkeeper (in ascending order), respectively.

Last updated: 5 May 2021.

Abbreviation

- Eff % – Save efficiency (Saves / Shots)

Year	Cap No.	Goalkeeper	Birth	Age	Saves	Shots	Eff %	ISHOF member	Note	Ref
1996	1	Aleksandar Šoštar (2)	1964	32	59	128	46.1%	2011	Starting goalkeeper	
1996	13	Milan Tadić	1970	26	2	11	18.2%			
2000 (bronze)	1	Aleksandar Šoštar (3)	1964	36	49	85	57.6%	2011	Starting goalkeeper	
2000 (bronze)	12	Nikola Kuljača	1974	26	6	6	100.0%			
2004 (silver)	1	Denis Šefik	1976	27	60	102	58.8%		Starting goalkeeper	
2004 (silver)	13	Nikola Kuljača (2)	1974	30	0	0	—			

Sources:

- Official Reports (PDF): 1996 (pp. 57–61, 70–72);
- Official Results Books (PDF): 2000 (pp. 46, 50, 56, 78, 83, 85, 88, 92), 2004 (pp. 223–224).

Notes:

- Denis Šefik is also listed in Serbia men's Olympic water polo team records and statistics, and Montenegro men's Olympic water polo team records and statistics.
- Aleksandar Šoštar is also listed in Yugoslavia men's Olympic water polo team records and statistics.

=== Top sprinters ===
The following table is pre-sorted by number of total sprints won (in descending order), year of the last Olympic appearance (in ascending order), year of the first Olympic appearance (in ascending order), name of the sprinter (in ascending order), respectively.

- Number of sprinters (30+ sprints won, since 2000): 1
- Number of sprinters (20–29 sprints won, since 2000): 0
- Number of sprinters (10–19 sprints won, since 2000): 0
- Number of sprinters (5–9 sprints won, since 2000): 0
- Last updated: 15 May 2021.

Abbreviation

- Eff % – Efficiency (Sprints won / Sprints contested)
- FRY – FR Yugoslavia
- SCG – Serbia and Montenegro
- SRB – Serbia

Male players with 5 or more sprints won at the Olympics (statistics since 2000)
Rk	Sprinter	Birth	Total sprints won	Total sprints contested	Eff %	Water polo tournaments (sprints won / contested)					Age of first/last	ISHOF member	Note	Ref
Rk	Sprinter	Birth	Total sprints won	Total sprints contested	Eff %	1	2	3	4	5	Age of first/last	ISHOF member	Note	Ref
1	Aleksandar Ćirić	1977	40	56	71.4%	2000; FRY (17/24)	2004; SCG (14/20)	2008; SRB (9/12)			22/30			

- Official Results Books (PDF): 2000 (pp. 46, 50, 56, 78, 83, 85, 88, 92), 2004 (pp. 223–224), 2008 (pp. 211–212).

Note:

- Aleksandar Ćirić is also listed in Serbia men's Olympic water polo team records and statistics.

== Coach statistics ==
=== Medals as coach and player ===
The following table is pre-sorted by total number of Olympic medals (in descending order), number of Olympic gold medals (in descending order), number of Olympic silver medals (in descending order), year of winning the last Olympic medal (in ascending order), year of winning the first Olympic medal (in ascending order), name of the person (in ascending order), respectively. Last updated: 5 May 2021.

Dejan Savić won three consecutive Olympic medals between 2000 and 2008. At the 2016 Summer Games in Rio de Janeiro, he coached Serbia men's national team to the Olympic title.

Rk	Person	Birth	Height	Player				Head coach			Total medals				Ref
Rk	Person	Birth	Height	Age	Men's team	Pos	Medal	Age	Men's team	Medal	G	S	B	T	Ref
1	Dejan Savić	1975	1.90 m (6 ft 3 in)	25	Yugoslavia	FP	2000 (bronze)	41	Serbia	2016 (gold)	1	1	2	4	
1	Dejan Savić	1975	1.90 m (6 ft 3 in)	29	Serbia and Montenegro	FP	2004 (silver)	41	Serbia	2016 (gold)	1	1	2	4	
1	Dejan Savić	1975	1.90 m (6 ft 3 in)	33	Serbia	FP	2008 (bronze)	41	Serbia	2016 (gold)	1	1	2	4	

Note:

- Dejan Savić is also listed in Serbia men's Olympic water polo team records and statistics.

== Water polo people at the opening and closing ceremonies ==
=== Flag bearers ===
Some sportspeople were chosen to carry the national flag of their country at the opening and closing ceremonies of the Olympic Games.

Igor Milanović, a water polo player representing Yugoslavia and then FR Yugoslavia, was given the honour to carry the flag for FR Yugoslavia.

Legend

- 2008 O – Opening ceremony of the 2008 Summer Olympics
- 2012 C – Closing ceremony of the 2012 Summer Olympics

Water polo people who were flag bearers at the opening and closing ceremonies of the Olympic Games
#	Year	Country	Flag bearer	Birth	Age	Height	Team	Pos	Water polo tournaments					Period (age of first/last)	Medals				Ref
#	Year	Country	Flag bearer	Birth	Age	Height	Team	Pos	1	2	3	4	5	Period (age of first/last)	G	S	B	T	Ref
1	1996 O	FR Yugoslavia	Igor Milanović	1965	30	1.95 m (6 ft 5 in)	Yugoslavia	FP	1984	1988				12 years (18/30)	2	0	0	2	
1	1996 O	FR Yugoslavia	Igor Milanović	1965	30	1.95 m (6 ft 5 in)	Yugoslavia	FP				1996		12 years (18/30)	2	0	0	2	

== See also ==
- Yugoslavia men's Olympic water polo team records and statistics
- Montenegro men's Olympic water polo team records and statistics
- Serbia men's Olympic water polo team records and statistics
- List of men's Olympic water polo tournament records and statistics
- Lists of Olympic water polo records and statistics
- Serbia and Montenegro at the Olympics
- Yugoslavia at the Olympics

== Sources ==
=== Official Reports (IOC) ===
PDF documents in the LA84 Foundation Digital Library:

- Official Report of the 1896 Olympic Games (download, archive)
- Official Report of the 1900 Olympic Games (download, archive)
- Official Report of the 1904 Olympic Games (download, archive)
- Official Report of the 1908 Olympic Games (download, archive) (pp. 359–361)
- Official Report of the 1912 Olympic Games (download, archive) (pp. 1021–1024, 1031–1037)
- Official Report of the 1920 Olympic Games (download, archive) (p. 130)
- Official Report of the 1924 Olympic Games (download, archive) (pp. 439–440, 486–494)
- Official Report of the 1928 Olympic Games (download, archive) (pp. 746–757, 797–807)
- Official Report of the 1932 Olympic Games (download, archive) (pp. 619–623, 646–652)
- Official Report of the 1936 Olympic Games, v.2 (download, archive) (pp. 345–356)
- Official Report of the 1948 Olympic Games (download, archive) (pp. 537–540, 640–647)
- Official Report of the 1952 Olympic Games (download, archive) (pp. 600–608)
- Official Report of the 1956 Olympic Games (download, archive) (pp. 592–594, 624–627)
- Official Report of the 1960 Olympic Games (download, archive) (pp. 552–555, 617–634)
- Official Report of the 1964 Olympic Games, v.2 (download, archive) (pp. 682–698)
- Official Report of the 1968 Olympic Games, v.3 (download, archive) (pp. 449–466, 811–826)
- Official Report of the 1972 Olympic Games, v.3 (download, archive) (pp. 331, 353–365)
- Official Report of the 1976 Olympic Games, v.3 (download, archive) (pp. 446–447, 484–497)
- Official Report of the 1980 Olympic Games, v.3 (download, archive) (pp. 458, 495–510)
- Official Report of the 1984 Olympic Games, v.2 (download, archive) (pp. 528–534)
- Official Report of the 1988 Olympic Games, v.2 (download, archive) (pp. 590–598)
- Official Report of the 1992 Olympic Games, v.5 (download, archive) (pp. 354, 386–400)
- Official Report of the 1996 Olympic Games, v.3 (download, archive) (pp. 56–73)

=== Official Results Books (IOC) ===
PDF documents in the LA84 Foundation Digital Library:

- Official Results Book – 2000 Olympic Games – Water Polo (download, archive)
- Official Results Book – 2004 Olympic Games – Water Polo (download, archive)
- Official Results Book – 2008 Olympic Games – Water Polo (download, archive)

PDF documents on the FINA website:

- Official Results Book – 2012 Olympic Games – Diving, Swimming, Synchronised Swimming, Water Polo (archive) (pp. 284–507)

PDF documents in the Olympic World Library:

- Official Results Book – 2016 Olympic Games – Water Polo (archive)

PDF documents on the International Olympic Committee website:

- Official Results Book – 2020 Olympic Games – Water Polo (archive)
- Official Results Book – 2024 Olympic Games – Water Polo

=== Official Reports (FINA) ===
PDF documents on the FINA website:

- HistoFINA – Water polo medalists and statistics (as of September 2019) (archive) (pp. 4–13)
- 1870–2020 | 150 years of Water Polo – Evolution of its rules (archive)

=== Official website (IOC) ===
Water polo on the International Olympic Committee website:

- Water polo
- Men's water polo

=== Olympedia ===
Water polo on the Olympedia website:

- Water polo Archived 2021-12-28 at the Wayback Machine
- Men's water polo
- Athlete count for water polo
- Water polo venues
- Water polo at the 1900 Summer Olympics (men's tournament)
- Water polo at the 1904 Summer Olympics (men's tournament)
- Water polo at the 1908 Summer Olympics (men's tournament)
- Water polo at the 1912 Summer Olympics (men's tournament)
- Water polo at the 1920 Summer Olympics (men's tournament)
- Water polo at the 1924 Summer Olympics (men's tournament)
- Water polo at the 1928 Summer Olympics (men's tournament)
- Water polo at the 1932 Summer Olympics (men's tournament)
- Water polo at the 1936 Summer Olympics (men's tournament)
- Water polo at the 1948 Summer Olympics (men's tournament)
- Water polo at the 1952 Summer Olympics (men's tournament)
- Water polo at the 1956 Summer Olympics (men's tournament)
- Water polo at the 1960 Summer Olympics (men's tournament)
- Water polo at the 1964 Summer Olympics (men's tournament)
- Water polo at the 1968 Summer Olympics (men's tournament)
- Water polo at the 1972 Summer Olympics (men's tournament)
- Water polo at the 1976 Summer Olympics (men's tournament)
- Water polo at the 1980 Summer Olympics (men's tournament)
- Water polo at the 1984 Summer Olympics (men's tournament)
- Water polo at the 1988 Summer Olympics (men's tournament)
- Water polo at the 1992 Summer Olympics (men's tournament)
- Water polo at the 1996 Summer Olympics (men's tournament)
- Water polo at the 2000 Summer Olympics (men's tournament)
- Water polo at the 2004 Summer Olympics (men's tournament)
- Water polo at the 2008 Summer Olympics (men's tournament)
- Water polo at the 2012 Summer Olympics (men's tournament)
- Water polo at the 2016 Summer Olympics (men's tournament)
- Water polo at the 2020 Summer Olympics (men's tournament)

=== Sports Reference ===
Water polo on the Sports Reference website:

- Country Medal Leaders & Athlete Medal Leaders (1900–2016) (archived)
- Men's water polo (1900–2016) (archived)
- Water polo at the 1900 Summer Games (men's tournament) (archived)
- Water polo at the 1904 Summer Games (men's tournament) (archived)
- Water polo at the 1908 Summer Games (men's tournament) (archived)
- Water polo at the 1912 Summer Games (men's tournament) (archived)
- Water polo at the 1920 Summer Games (men's tournament) (archived)
- Water polo at the 1924 Summer Games (men's tournament) (archived)
- Water polo at the 1928 Summer Games (men's tournament) (archived)
- Water polo at the 1932 Summer Games (men's tournament) (archived)
- Water polo at the 1936 Summer Games (men's tournament) (archived)
- Water polo at the 1948 Summer Games (men's tournament) (archived)
- Water polo at the 1952 Summer Games (men's tournament) (archived)
- Water polo at the 1956 Summer Games (men's tournament) (archived)
- Water polo at the 1960 Summer Games (men's tournament) (archived)
- Water polo at the 1964 Summer Games (men's tournament) (archived)
- Water polo at the 1968 Summer Games (men's tournament) (archived)
- Water polo at the 1972 Summer Games (men's tournament) (archived)
- Water polo at the 1976 Summer Games (men's tournament) (archived)
- Water polo at the 1980 Summer Games (men's tournament) (archived)
- Water polo at the 1984 Summer Games (men's tournament) (archived)
- Water polo at the 1988 Summer Games (men's tournament) (archived)
- Water polo at the 1992 Summer Games (men's tournament) (archived)
- Water polo at the 1996 Summer Games (men's tournament) (archived)
- Water polo at the 2000 Summer Games (men's tournament) (archived)
- Water polo at the 2004 Summer Games (men's tournament) (archived)
- Water polo at the 2008 Summer Games (men's tournament) (archived)
- Water polo at the 2012 Summer Games (men's tournament) (archived)
- Water polo at the 2016 Summer Games (men's tournament) (archived)
- Water polo at the 2020 Summer Games (men's tournament) (archived)

=== Todor66 ===
Water polo on the Todor66 website:

- Water polo at the Summer Games
- Water polo at the 1900 Summer Olympics (men's tournament)
- Water polo at the 1904 Summer Olympics (men's tournament)
- Water polo at the 1908 Summer Olympics (men's tournament)
- Water polo at the 1912 Summer Olympics (men's tournament)
- Water polo at the 1920 Summer Olympics (men's tournament)
- Water polo at the 1924 Summer Olympics (men's tournament)
- Water polo at the 1928 Summer Olympics (men's tournament)
- Water polo at the 1932 Summer Olympics (men's tournament)
- Water polo at the 1936 Summer Olympics (men's tournament)
- Water polo at the 1948 Summer Olympics (men's tournament)
- Water polo at the 1952 Summer Olympics (men's tournament)
- Water polo at the 1956 Summer Olympics (men's tournament)
- Water polo at the 1960 Summer Olympics (men's tournament)
- Water polo at the 1964 Summer Olympics (men's tournament)
- Water polo at the 1968 Summer Olympics (men's tournament, men's qualification)
- Water polo at the 1972 Summer Olympics (men's tournament, men's qualification)
- Water polo at the 1976 Summer Olympics (men's tournament, men's European qualification)
- Water polo at the 1980 Summer Olympics (men's tournament, men's European qualification, men's world qualification)
- Water polo at the 1984 Summer Olympics (men's tournament, men's qualification)
- Water polo at the 1988 Summer Olympics (men's tournament, men's qualification)
- Water polo at the 1992 Summer Olympics (men's tournament, men's qualification)
- Water polo at the 1996 Summer Olympics (men's tournament, men's qualification)
- Water polo at the 2000 Summer Olympics (men's tournament, men's qualification)
- Water polo at the 2004 Summer Olympics (men's tournament, men's qualification)
- Water polo at the 2008 Summer Olympics (men's tournament, men's qualification)
- Water polo at the 2012 Summer Olympics (men's tournament, men's qualification)
- Water polo at the 2016 Summer Olympics (men's tournament, men's qualification)
- Water polo at the 2020 Summer Olympics (men's tournament, men's qualification)
- Water polo at the 2024 Summer Olympics (men's tournament, men's qualification)

=== ISHOF ===
International Swimming Hall of Fame (ISHOF) website:

- Honorees Listed by Category – Water Polo
- Honorees Listed by Category – Coaches
- Honorees Listed by Category – Contributors
- Honorees by Country
- Honorees By Last Name
