= VK Stari Grad =

- Full name: Vaterpolo Klub Stari Grad; Ватерполо Клуб Стари Град (Stari Grad Waterpolo Club)
- Sport: Water Polo
- Founded: 11 April 2005; 21 years ago
- League: Serbian Super League; VRL First League
- Based in: Belgrade, Serbia
- Arena: SC Milan Gale Muškatirović; Tašmajdan SRC
- Head coach: Zoran Mijalkovski

VK Stari Grad (Serbian Cyrillic: ВК Стари Град) is a professional water polo club based in Belgrade, Serbia. As of 2026–27, the team competes in the Serbian Super League and the regional VRL First League.

== History ==
The club was founded on the 11th of April 2005 by Branislav Jerković and Miloš Saković. The club first competed in the Serbian summer league in the 2005-06 season.

== Honours ==
=== Domestic Leagues ===
- Prva A Liga Srbije: 2016-17
