= Igor Porobić =

Montenegrin water polo player

Personal information
- Nationality: Montenegro
- Born: 21 April 1993 (age 33) Montenegro

Sport
- Country: Montenegro
- Sport: Water polo

Igor Porobić (born April 21, 1993) is a Montenegrin water polo player.
