= VK Singidunum =

Serbian water polo club

Vaterpolo klub Singidunum
- Founded: 2008; 18 years ago
- League: Serbian Water Polo First League
- Based in: Belgrade, Serbia
- Arena: SC Banjica
- Colors
- Head coach: Zoran Mijalkovski

Vaterpolo klub Singidunum (Serbian Cyrillic: Ватерполо клуб Сингидунум) is a water polo club from Belgrade, Serbia. The team competes in the Serbian Water Polo First League.
