= Marko Petković (water polo) =

Montenegrin water polo player (born 1989)

Personal information
- Nationality: Montenegro
- Born: 3 March 1989 (age 37) Belgrade, SFR Yugoslavia

Sport
- Sport: Water polo
Medal record
Men's water polo
Representing Serbia
Universiade
Gold medal – first place	2011 Shenzhen	Team

Marko Petković (born 3 March 1989) is a Montenegrin water polo player. He competed in the 2020 Summer Olympics.
