= VK ŽAK =

Serbian water polo club

Vaterpolo klub ŽAK
- Founded: 1951; 75 years ago
- League: Serbian Water Polo First League
- Based in: Kikinda, Serbia
- Arena: SC Jezero
- Colors
- President: (Serbia) Milorad Aleksić
- Head coach: (Serbia) Aleksandar Pavić

Vaterpolo klub ŽAK (Serbian Cyrillic: Ватерполо клуб ЖАК) is a water polo club from Kikinda, Serbia. The team last competed in the Serbian Water Polo First League, having climbed to that league in 2022.
