= VK Dunav =

Serbian water polo team

Vaterpolo klub Dunav
- Based in: Novi Sad, Serbia
- Arena: Slana Bara
- Colors

Vaterpolo klub Dunav (Serbian Cyrillic: Ватерполо клуб Дунав) was a water polo club from Novi Sad, Serbia.
