= VK Banjica =

Vaterpolo klub Banjica
- Based in: Belgrade, Serbia
- Arena: SC Banjica
- Colors

Vaterpolo klub Banjica (Serbian Cyrillic: Ватерполо клуб Бањица) was a water polo club from Belgrade, Serbia.
