= Serbia men's national water polo team European Championships overview =

Serbia takes part in the European Water Polo Championship and has won the men's competition in 2006, 2012, 2014 and 2016.

== 2012 Eindhoven ==
=== Preparations for the championship ===
On 15 December 2011, Coach Dejan Udovičić announced a wider squad for the upcoming European Championships in Eindhoven. He said that the competition would be important as a last check before the main event of the season – the Olympic Games in London. "The group is difficult but I am satisfied. The most important thing is to see what are our options before the Olympic Games in London. Of course we all want to attack the first place, it is our debt to the previous generations of Serbian water polo, and those who come," said Udovičić at a press conference in Belgrade. Serbia's coach revealed that the "dolphins'" first training would be on 17 December and that the whole squad would be present except Mikić who still had obligations with his team. From 8 January, they would go on a trip to Greece on a tournament where they would meet with Greece, Montenegro and Spain. Bronze team from the previous championship would travel to Eindhoven on 14 January. Udovičić announced that the team would consist of: Goalkeepers: Slobodan Soro, Gojko Pijetlović, Branislav Mitrović; players: Marko Avramović, Živko Gocić, Vanja Udovičić, Miloš Ćuk, Duško Pijetlović, Slobodan Nikić, Milan Aleksić, Nikola Rađen, Filip Filipović, Andrija Prlainović, Stefan Mitrović, Luka Šaponjić, Dušan Mandić, Nemanja Ubović and Aleks Šaponjić.

In Eindhoven on 29 December in a friendly match, Serbia beat Netherlands 15:6 (4:1, 5:1, 3:1, 3:3). Serbian team played very seriously and for a full three quarters absolutely dominated. Goalkeepers shared playing time, with Gojko Pijetlović defending the first two, and Branislav Mitrović other two quarters. Selector Dejan Udovičić decided to rest his most experienced players, goalkeeper Soro, captain Udovičić and Filipović, Gocić and young Ubović. The most efficient in their ranks were Nikola Rađen and Andrija Prlainović hitting the net three times, while Ćuk, Nikić and Aleksić scored two goals. Dušan Mandić and Aleksa Šaponjić debuted, Šaponjić scored a goal. Preparations for the European Championship continued on 2 January 2012. European Water Polo Championship were held in Eindhoven on 16–29 January 2012, and Serbia played in Group B with Croatia, Montenegro, Romania, Spain and Germany.

=== Squad for the Cup ===
At a press conference on 13 January 2012, Udovičić announced a list of players who would play at the European Championships in Eindhoven. The debutants were goalkeeper Branislav Mitrović and Aleksa Šaponjić, who played instead of Gojko Pijetlović and Marko Avramović. The squad members were: Slobodan Soro, Aleksa Šaponjić, Živko Gocić, Vanja Udovičić (C), Miloš Ćuk, Duško Pijetlović, Slobodan Nikić, Marko Aleksić, Nikola Rađen, Filip Filipović, Andrija Prlainović, Stefan Mitrović and Branislav Mitrović. Udovičić noted that he chose the best players but that all participants from the preparations were part of the team.

=== Preliminary round ===
Group B

| | Team | G | W | D | L | GF | GA | Diff | Points |
|---|---|---|---|---|---|---|---|---|---|
| 1. | Serbia | 5 | 4 | 0 | 1 | 57 | 45 | +12 | 12 |
| 2. | Montenegro | 5 | 3 | 1 | 1 | 53 | 42 | +11 | 10 |
| 3. | Germany | 5 | 3 | 0 | 2 | 55 | 54 | +1 | 9 |
| 4. | Croatia | 5 | 3 | 0 | 2 | 52 | 50 | +2 | 9 |
| 5. | Spain | 5 | 1 | 1 | 3 | 47 | 55 | −8 | 4 |
| 6. | Romania | 5 | 0 | 0 | 5 | 39 | 57 | −18 | 0 |

| Team advances to Semifinals |
| Team advances to Quarterfinals |
| Team competes in placement matches |

On 16 January, Serbia water polo team beat Spain 8:5 (1:0, 2:3, 3:1, 2:1) in a game at the start of the European Championship. The match rivals who played in the finals at the World Championships in Rome, started with great defense and a few attacks on both sides, without much innovation. Hard game made the offense a little sharper, which awarded the "Fury" at the start with a five-meter penalty, which keeper Soro prevented from ending in his net. On the other side, the Spaniards were immediately punish for the failure by Duško Pijetović with a majestic goal from about six feet for the lead - 1:0. Spain scored for the first time in the 10th minute of the game managing to beat Soro. After that the Spaniards have caught up with Serbian sleeping defense and have taken the lead - 1:2. Before the end of the first half, at first Stefan Mitrović managed to tie the result, after what Iván Ernesto Pérez, a veteran and perhaps the most famous bower in the last two decades managed to checkmate Soro from minute and a half before the break but that wasn't it. Rađen made the tie with a stunt goal from a distance making it 3:3. In the second half Serbs came back with a two-goal lead. First the captain Udovičić, had three seconds to choose where to shoot and made it fatal for the Fury and in the next attack, Rađen shot a missile and brought a two-goal advantage for the "dolphins" - 5:3. Three minutes from the end of the third quarter, Perrone scored to reduce the result. Spain had a chance to tie in the next attack but with not using the player more they were punished by Udovičić who hit the left corner of the goal for 6:4. Slobodan Soro has crowned his excellent game in the last minute of the third quarter, when he defended a five-meter penalty after which captain Udovičić sank a counterattack and scored for 7:4, three and a half minutes remaining. Duško Pijetlović scored in the same way, in the next minute making even a greater advantage. With this victory Serbs sent a clear message: They have arrived for the new title, and even Marc Minguell's beautiful goal didn't brake that impression.

- Game one

| 16 January 2012; 17:30 | Report | Serbia | 8–5 | Spain | Pieter van den Hoogenband Zwemstadion, Eindhoven; Attendance: 500; Referees: Koryzna (POL), Vasileiou (GRE) |
| 16 January 2012; 17:30 | Report | Score by quarters: 1–0, 2–3, 3–1, 2–1 | | | Pieter van den Hoogenband Zwemstadion, Eindhoven; Attendance: 500; Referees: Koryzna (POL), Vasileiou (GRE) |
| 16 January 2012; 17:30 | Report | Udovičić 3, D.Pijetlović 2, Rađen 2, S.Mitrović 1 | Goals | Perrone 2, Molina 1, Minguell 1, Pérez 1 | Pieter van den Hoogenband Zwemstadion, Eindhoven; Attendance: 500; Referees: Koryzna (POL), Vasileiou (GRE) |

On 17 January, Serbian water polo players got the second triumph at the European Championships in Eindhoven. "The Dolphins' selection won against Germany with a score 13:12 (2:3, 5:2, 4:4, 2:3). Dejan Udovičić's defense didn't stood out in the opening minutes because they allowed the Germans a 2:0 lead after two early ejections for Pijetlović. Serbia was quickly stabilized and equalized the game at 2:2, but the Germans took advantage of the extra player and scored for the final result in the first quarter - 3:2. However, the balance was soon restored to the proper measure. The "dolphins" were much more engaged in the attack, including defense, resulting in a two-goal advantage before the break - 7:5. Serbia failed to brake the match in the third quarter and allowed Germany to successfully follow the rhythm of their last seven minutes before the result was 11:9. Goal for goal series continued in the last quarter, which is why the match was uncertain in the final minutes. Pijetlović scored for 13:11, but Bukowski reduced to 13:12 at the last minute for the result. Centers of Serbia marked a good game in attack with Duško Pijetlović scoring four goals and Slobodan Nikić one.

- Game two

| 17 January 2012; 14:30 | Report | Serbia | 13–12 | Germany | Pieter van den Hoogenband Zwemstadion, Eindhoven; Attendance: 550; Referees: Koganov (AZE), Vogel (HUN) |
| 17 January 2012; 14:30 | Report | Score by quarters: 2–3, 5–2, 4–4, 2–3 | | | Pieter van den Hoogenband Zwemstadion, Eindhoven; Attendance: 550; Referees: Koganov (AZE), Vogel (HUN) |
| 17 January 2012; 14:30 | Report | D.Pijetlović 4, Udovičić 2, Filipović 2, Prlainović 2, Gocić 1, Nikić 1, Aleksić 1 | Goals | Politze 4, Bukowski 2, Shoyler 2, Kreuzmann 1, Oeler 1, Schlotterbeck 1, Rising 1 | Pieter van den Hoogenband Zwemstadion, Eindhoven; Attendance: 550; Referees: Koganov (AZE), Vogel (HUN) |

On 19 January Serbs defeated the defending European champions Croatia with 12:15 (2:2, 4:6, 3:3, 3:4) in a third-round game and made a decisive step towards direct placement in the semifinals. At first it seemed all sports, Serbs responded after Croats scored three times in a row. Joković - Aleksić, Sukno - Nikić and Sukno - Udovičić were the scorers before the Serbian defense team came on the scene with masterful goalkeeper Soro and counterattacks. First Filipović scored a master lob, after which Prlainović made a precise, quick turnaround for 5:3. After Frano Karač dropped the result with a five-meter penalty, another counter was fatal for the Croats when Udovičić took his team to the lead of 6:4. 32-year-old Karač from Zagreb, reduced the advantage for the second time in a row, but then Stefan Mitrović in a situation with a player more, with a two-meter dribbling pushed the ball into the opponents net for 7:5. Then Udovičić appeared on the scene with a great spin-dribbling and hitting the net for the third time. Tumultuous first half ended with Joković realizing a situation with two players more and making the final score 8:5. In the third quarter, Duško Pijetlović and Miloš Ćuk took the advantage of a player more and raised the result to 10:6. Ivan Buljubašić interrupted a large series of "dolphins" with his first goal in a match, after which Sukno managed to score a goal and broke in to a half the "-4" backlog. However, Živko Gocić with his precise shot got the three-goal advantage back to his national team. After that, Miho Bošković precisely executed a five-meter penalty. The last quarter didn't go as "dolphins" had hoped. In Croats next attack, Mitrović was excluded and Sukno scored his fourth goal for 11:10. Mitrović made amends for his error and in the same minute took advantage of a two men more and knocked the ball into the net for 12:10. "Dolphins" new good defense allowed them a good offense, which gave them a new twist and a new goal - a great goal by D.Pijetlović, as well as Ćuk's masterful stroke in the next attack which increased the advantage to 14:10. When it became known who will rejoice, those who wouldn't, they began to rage. Dobud struck Filipović from behind who instantly got the bruising under his eye, but at the very next action he revenged with a hit. The final score was 15:12 for Serbia.

- Game three

| 19 January 2012; 17:30 | Report | Croatia | 12–15 | Serbia | Pieter van den Hoogenband Zwemstadion, Eindhoven; Attendance: 1,200; Referees: Bianchi (ITA), Levin (ISR) |
| 19 January 2012; 17:30 | Report | Score by quarters: 2–2, 4–6, 3–3, 3–4 | | | Pieter van den Hoogenband Zwemstadion, Eindhoven; Attendance: 1,200; Referees: Bianchi (ITA), Levin (ISR) |
| 19 January 2012; 17:30 | Report | Sukno 4, Joković 3, Karač 2, Buljubašić 1, Bušlje 1, Bošković 1 | Goals | Udovičić 3, Ćuk 2, D.Pijetlović 2, Filipović 2, S.Mitrović 2, Prlainović 1, Aleksić 1, Nikić 1, Gocić 1 | Pieter van den Hoogenband Zwemstadion, Eindhoven; Attendance: 1,200; Referees: Bianchi (ITA), Levin (ISR) |

On 21 January, Serbia routinely came to the fourth victory at the European Championships in Eindhoven beating Romania 14:5 (3:0, 4:0, 3:1, 4:4). "Dolphins" kept one hundred percent due to a great defense, which prevented their eastern neighbors to score in the first two quarters. Filip Filipović and Vanja Udovičić were in the pool despite the many blows they received in the match with Croatia and they successfully led Serbia despite the absence of coach Dejan Udovičić who was suspended. Slobodan Soro was an insurmountable obstacle for Romania and went to half with a score of 7:0. Serbia goalkeeper was beaten for the first time in the 18th minute when Diaconu was alone in front of him but by the end of the third quarter result was 10:1. Serbia players relaxation in the fourth quarter allowed the Romanians to overcome Soro on a few more occasions, but at the end Serbia finished the match with a 14:5 score. The most effective person in the match was Duško Pijetlović with four goals, followed by Prlainović scoring a goal less.

- Game four

| 21 January 2012; 13:00 | Report | Serbia | 14–5 | Romania | Pieter van den Hoogenband Zwemstadion, Eindhoven; Attendance: 700; Referees: Taylan (TUR), Koryzna (POL) |
| 21 January 2012; 13:00 | Report | Score by quarters: 3–0, 4–0, 3–1, 4–4 | | | Pieter van den Hoogenband Zwemstadion, Eindhoven; Attendance: 700; Referees: Taylan (TUR), Koryzna (POL) |
| 21 January 2012; 13:00 | Report | D.Pijetlović 4, Prlainović 3, Udovičić 2, Ćuk 1, Šaponjić 1, Gocić 1, Nikić 1, Rađen 1 | Goals | Diaconu 2, Iosep 2, Radu 1 | Pieter van den Hoogenband Zwemstadion, Eindhoven; Attendance: 700; Referees: Taylan (TUR), Koryzna (POL) |

On 23 January, in the last round of group A, Serbia lost to Montenegro with 11:7 (3:2, 3:1, 3:4, 2:0). After Slobodan Soro defended Janović's five meter penalty, Serbia goalkeeper raised the confidence at the beginning of the match between his teammates Vanja Udovičić and Živko Gocić who have scored two goals and took the lead with 2:0. However, Montenegro came to the advantage with three goals after the first quarter. Serbia was in a constant disadvantage during the second quarter. With Mlađan and Nikola Janović goals, rivals have increased the result to 5:2. It was clear after Filip Klikovac goal for 6:2, that it would be hard for Serbian's to win but Duško Pijetlović managed to reduce the result at the end of the quarter by scoring in a situation with a player more. In the third quarter, first Prlainović reduced the result to 6:4, but after Filipović failed with a lobe (he hit the crossbar), Ivović on the other side increased the result to 7:4. Then Udovičić hit the crossbar to after which Nikola Janović increased the lead by "+4". Aleksić, Gocić and D.Pijetlović found the "sharks" net at the end of the quarter, but Mlađan Janović held the advantage of 9:7 with a five-meter penalty. In the last quarter, Serbia had a player more on three occasions, but even then they failed to overcome Šćepanović. The result was 11:7 for Montenegro.

- Game five

| 23 January 2012; 16:00 | Report | Serbia | 7–11 | Montenegro | Pieter van den Hoogenband Zwemstadion, Eindhoven; Attendance: 750; Referees: Stavridis (GRE), Levin (ISR) |
| 23 January 2012; 16:00 | Report | Score by quarters: 2–3, 1–3, 4–3, 0–2 | | | Pieter van den Hoogenband Zwemstadion, Eindhoven; Attendance: 750; Referees: Stavridis (GRE), Levin (ISR) |
| 23 January 2012; 16:00 | Report | Gocić 2, D.Pijetlović 2, Udovičić 1, Aleksić 1, Prlainović 1 | Goals | M.Janović 3, Ivović 3, N.Janović 2, Petrović 1, Klikovac 1, Jokić 1 | Pieter van den Hoogenband Zwemstadion, Eindhoven; Attendance: 750; Referees: Stavridis (GRE), Levin (ISR) |

=== Final round ===
On 27 January Serbia defeated the current world champion, Italy, with 8:12 (5:4, 1:4, 1:3, 1:1) and thus qualified for the finals. This game began with nine goals marking the first eight minutes. Since Slobodan Soro received five goals, coach Dejan Udovičić replaced him before the end of the first quarter with Branislav Mitrović. The goal of young debutant Šaponjić was enough to tie at 5:5. From the 6–6 tie, Serbia water polo players begun to hold a lesson in modern versions of the sport to a team that is the current world champion. It was not revenge for defeat in the final of 2011 Shanghai, it was a simple lesson, which consisted of three phases - solid defense, a wise selection of moves in the attack and forceful implementation. This is exactly what has brought five consecutive goals for Serbia national team, of which the famous rival did not recover.

- Semifinal

| 27 January 2012; 18:00 | Report | Italy | 8–12 | Serbia | Pieter van den Hoogenband Zwemstadion, Eindhoven; Attendance: 1,800; Referees: Levin (ISR), Teixido (ESP) |
| 27 January 2012; 18:00 | Report | Score by quarters: 5–4, 1–4, 1–3, 1–1 | | | Pieter van den Hoogenband Zwemstadion, Eindhoven; Attendance: 1,800; Referees: Levin (ISR), Teixido (ESP) |
| 27 January 2012; 18:00 | Report | Gallo 3, Figari 2, Figlioli 1, Giorgetti 1, Felugo 1 | Goals | Filipović 3, Udovičić 2, Aleksić 2, S.Mitrović 2, Šaponjić 1, Ćuk 1, Prlainović 1 | Pieter van den Hoogenband Zwemstadion, Eindhoven; Attendance: 1,800; Referees: Levin (ISR), Teixido (ESP) |

On 29 January Serbia water polo team won its second European title since independence, and "dolphins" won the gold by beating Montenegro 9:8 (1:1,2:3,3:1,3:3), paying them back for defeat in the 2008 European Championship finals played in Málaga. Defence was in both teams fare better than the attacks were, offensive actions were often interrupted due to the errors of players who have rushed by the opposing goal, and the goalkeepers on both sides were pointed out. Therefore, it was full seven minutes until the first goal was scored, but whenever someone managed to take the lead, the draw would arrive in the next attack. At one point, "dolphins" were left without two teammates who were excluded, but not only they did not hesitated in that situation, but they managed to defend themselves from that difficult situation. About ten seconds later, Aleksić scored from counterattack to give Serbia a lead a hold it until the end. The result was 9:8 for Serbia.

- Final

| 29 January 2012; 15:30 | Report | Serbia | 9–8 | Montenegro | Pieter van den Hoogenband Zwemstadion, Eindhoven; Attendance: 3500; Referees: Gomez (ITA), Stavridis (GRE) |
| 29 January 2012; 15:30 | Report | Score by quarters: 1–1, 2–3, 3–1, 3–3 | | | Pieter van den Hoogenband Zwemstadion, Eindhoven; Attendance: 3500; Referees: Gomez (ITA), Stavridis (GRE) |
| 29 January 2012; 15:30 | Report | S.Mitrović 2, Udovičić 2, Rađen 1, D.Pijetlović 1, Filipović 1, Aleksić 1, Prlainović 1 | Goals | Radović 3, Ivović 2, Janović 1, Gojković 1, Paskovi 1 | Pieter van den Hoogenband Zwemstadion, Eindhoven; Attendance: 3500; Referees: Gomez (ITA), Stavridis (GRE) |

=== Final ranking ===
| RANK | TEAM |
|---|---|
| | Serbia |
| | Montenegro |
| | Hungary |

2012 Men's European champion

Serbia
Fifth title

Team roster

Slobodan Soro, Aleksa Šaponjić, Živko Gocić, Vanja Udovičić, Miloš Ćuk, Duško Pijetlović, Slobodan Nikić, Milan Aleksić, Nikola Rađen, Filip Filipović, Andrija Prlainović, Stefan Mitrović, and Branislav Mitrović
Head coach: Dejan Udovičić
