= Branislav Mitrović =

Serbian water polo player

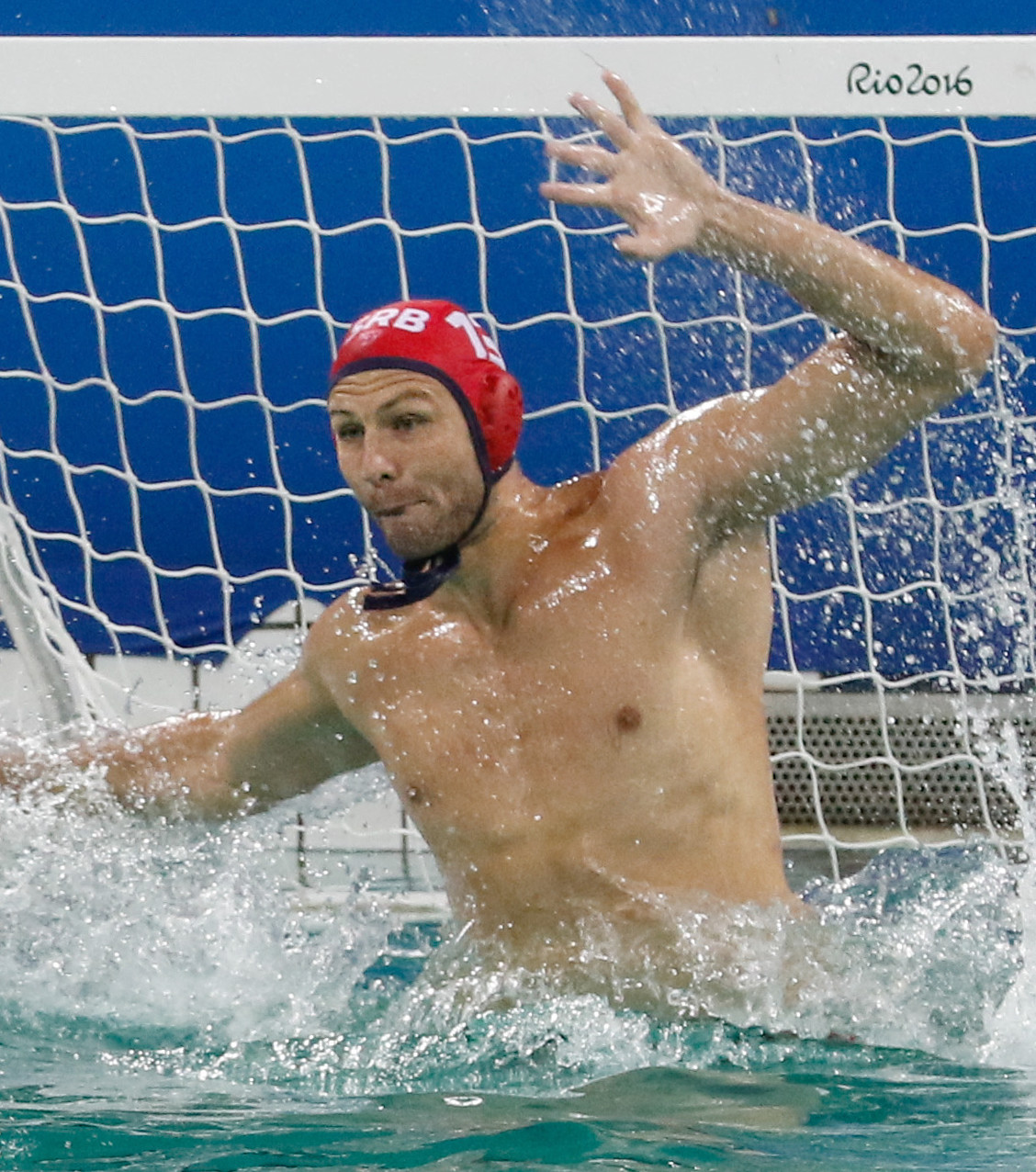
- Mitrović at the 2016 Summer Olympics

Personal information
- Nationality: Serbian
- Born: 30 January 1985 (age 41) Novi Sad, SR Serbia, SFR Yugoslavia
- Height: 2.01 m (6 ft 7 in)
- Weight: 100 kg (220 lb)

Sport
- Sport: Water polo
- Current club: Vasas

Senior clubs
- Years: Team
- 2003–2007: Vojvodina
- 2007–2010: Partizan
- 2010–2011: Ferencvárosi
- 2011–2014: Debreceni
- 2014–2018: Egri
- 2018–2020: OSC Budapest
- 2020–present: Vasas
Medal record
Men's water polo
Representing Serbia
Olympic Games
Gold medal – first place	2016 Rio de Janeiro	Team
Gold medal – first place	2020 Tokyo	Team
World Championship
Gold medal – first place	2015 Kazan	Team
Bronze medal – third place	2017 Budapest	Team
European Championship
Gold medal – first place	2012 Eindhoven
Gold medal – first place	2014 Budapest
Gold medal – first place	2016 Belgrade
Gold medal – first place	2018 Barcelona
FINA World League
Gold medal – first place	2013 Chelyabinsk
Gold medal – first place	2014 Dubai
Gold medal – first place	2015 Bergamo
Gold medal – first place	2016 Huizhou
Gold medal – first place	2017 Ruza
Gold medal – first place	2019 Belgrade
Mediterranean Games
Gold medal – first place	2018 Tarragona
Bronze medal – third place	2005 Almeria
Universiade
Gold medal – first place	2011 Shenzhen	Team
Bronze medal – third place	2009 Belgrade	Team

Branislav Mitrović (Serbian Cyrillic: Бранислав Митровић; born 30 January 1985) is a Serbian water polo goalkeeper for Vasas and the Serbia men's national water polo team. He won the European title in 2012, 2014, 2016 and 2018, the world title in 2015, and Olympic gold medals in 2016 and 2020. He was named the Best Goalkeeper at the 2015 World Championship and 2020 Olympic Games.

== National career ==
On 29 January 2012, Mitrović won the European Championship with his national team beating in the final Montenegro by 9:8. This was his first gold medal with the national team. He retired from national team in 2024.

== Personal life ==
Mitrović became a goalkeeper after an advice from his first coach to make use of his large frame and long hands in the goal. He is married to Jelena.

== See also ==
- Serbia men's Olympic water polo team records and statistics
- List of Olympic champions in men's water polo
- List of Olympic medalists in water polo (men)
- List of men's Olympic water polo tournament goalkeepers
- List of world champions in men's water polo
- List of World Aquatics Championships medalists in water polo
