= Montenegro at the 2013 Summer Universiade =

- IOC code: MNE

in Kazan
- Competitors: 15 in 2 sports
- Medals Ranked -th: Gold 0 Silver 0 Bronze 0 Total 0

Summer Universiade appearances
- 1959; 1961; 1963; 1965; 1967; 1970; 1973; 1975; 1977; 1979; 1981; 1983; 1985; 1987; 1989; 1991; 1993; 1995; 1997; 1999; 2001; 2003; 2005; 2007; 2009; 2011; 2013; 2015; 2017; 2019; 2021; 2025; 2027

Montenegro competed at the 2013 Summer Universiade in Kazan, Russia from 6 to 17 July 2013.

== Shooting ==
Men

Athlete	Event	Qualification		Final	
Athlete	Event	Points	Rank	Points	Rank
Stefan Čađenović	10 metre air pistol	DNS		Did not advance	
Stefan Čađenović	50 metre pistol	DNS		Did not advance	

Women

Athlete	Event	Qualification		Final	
Athlete	Event	Points	Rank	Points	Rank
Mirjana Radović	10 metre air rifle	DNS		Did not advance	

== Water polo ==
Preliminary round

Team	GP	W	D	L	GF	GA	GD	Pts
Italy	5	4	0	1	63	37	+26	8
Serbia	5	4	0	1	61	28	+33	8
United States	5	2	1	2	47	34	+13	5
Brazil	5	2	1	2	52	42	+10	5
Montenegro	5	2	0	3	56	39	+17	4
Belgium	5	0	0	5	13	112	–99	0

5 July 2013; 15:30	Report	Serbia	9–5	Montenegro	Burevestnik Swimming Pool; Referees: C, Gerzanich (RUS)
5 July 2013; 15:30	Report	Score by quarters: 2–1, 3–1, 2–1, 2–2			Burevestnik Swimming Pool; Referees: C, Gerzanich (RUS)
5 July 2013; 15:30	Report	Vuksanović 3	Goals	Murišić 2	Burevestnik Swimming Pool; Referees: C, Gerzanich (RUS)

7 July 2013; 15:30	Report	Montenegro	8–9	United States	Burevestnik Swimming Pool; Referees: Franulović (CRO), Mebuke (GEO)
7 July 2013; 15:30	Report	Score by quarters: 1–2, 0–3, 1–1, 6–3			Burevestnik Swimming Pool; Referees: Franulović (CRO), Mebuke (GEO)
7 July 2013; 15:30	Report	Šarić 3	Goals	P. Reynolds 3	Burevestnik Swimming Pool; Referees: Franulović (CRO), Mebuke (GEO)

8 July 2013; 17:00	Report	Belgium	5–24	Montenegro	Burevestnik Swimming Pool; Referees: Boros-Djevi (AUS), Deslieres (CAN)
8 July 2013; 17:00	Report	Score by quarters: 1–6, 1–7, 2–4, 1–7			Burevestnik Swimming Pool; Referees: Boros-Djevi (AUS), Deslieres (CAN)
8 July 2013; 17:00	Report	five players 1	Goals	Šarić 4	Burevestnik Swimming Pool; Referees: Boros-Djevi (AUS), Deslieres (CAN)

10 July 2013; 18:30	Report	Montenegro	13–9	Italy	Burevestnik Swimming Pool; Referees: Carney (AUS), Vasenin (RUS)
10 July 2013; 18:30	Report	Score by quarters: 2–2, 3–4, 5–1, 3–2			Burevestnik Swimming Pool; Referees: Carney (AUS), Vasenin (RUS)
10 July 2013; 18:30	Report	Popović, Murišić 3	Goals	Gitto 3	Burevestnik Swimming Pool; Referees: Carney (AUS), Vasenin (RUS)

11 July 2013; 14:00	Report	Brazil	7–6	Montenegro	Burevestnik Swimming Pool; Referees: Mebuke (GEO), Szekely (HUN)
11 July 2013; 14:00	Report	Score by quarters: 2–2, 3–2, 1–2, 1–0			Burevestnik Swimming Pool; Referees: Mebuke (GEO), Szekely (HUN)
11 July 2013; 14:00	Report	Baches Delgado 4	Goals	Šarić 3	Burevestnik Swimming Pool; Referees: Mebuke (GEO), Szekely (HUN)
