= 2015 FINA Men's Water Polo World League =

- League: FINA Water Polo World League
- Sport: Water Polo

FINA Men's Water Polo World League seasons
- ← 2014 2016 →

The 2015 FINA Men's Water Polo World League is played between November 2014 and June 2015 and open to all men's water polo national teams. After participating in a preliminary round, eight teams qualify to play in a final tournament, called the Super Final in Bergamo, Italy from 23 to 28 June 2015.

In the world league, there are specific rules that do not allow matches to end in a draw. If teams are level at the end of the 4th quarter of any world league match, the match will be decided by a penalty shootout. Teams earn points in the standings in group matches as follows:

- Match won in normal time - 3 points
- Match won in shootout - 2 points
- Match lost in shootout - 1 point
- Match lost in normal time - 0 points

== Europe ==
=== Preliminary round ===
The European preliminary round consisted of two group of four teams and a third group of five teams. The winner of each group after the home and away series of games qualified for the Super Final.

==== Group A ====
Team	GP	W	L	GF	GA	GD	Pts
Hungary	6	6	0	87	57	+30	18
Greece	6	4	2	84	63	+21	12
Romania	6	2	4	58	88	-30	5
Slovakia	6	0	6	55	76	-21	1

18 Nov 2014; 18:00	Game 1	Greece	15 (8)–8 (4)	Romania	Athens, Greece
18 Nov 2014; 18:00	Game 1	Score by quarters: 4–1, 4–3, 1–1, 6–3			Athens, Greece

18 Nov 2014; 19:00	Game 2	Hungary	13 (7)–6 (5)	Slovakia	Debrecen, Hungary
18 Nov 2014; 19:00	Game 2	Score by quarters: 4–3, 3–2, 2–1, 4–0			Debrecen, Hungary

9 Dec 2014; 18:00	Game 3	Slovakia	10 (4)–16 (8)	Greece	Nováky, Slovakia
9 Dec 2014; 18:00	Game 3	Score by quarters: 4–4, 0–4, 3–5, 3–3			Nováky, Slovakia

10 Dec 2014; 18:25	Game 4	Hungary	20 (10)–10 (6)	Romania	Miskolc, Hungary
10 Dec 2014; 18:25	Game 4	Score by quarters: 5–3, 5–3, 5–0, 5–4			Miskolc, Hungary

20 Jan 2015; 18:00	Game 5	Romania	14 (4)–13 (7) (OT)	Slovakia	Bucharest, Romania
20 Jan 2015; 18:00	Game 5	Score by quarters: 3–4, 1–3, 3–2, 2–0 OT: 5–4			Bucharest, Romania

20 Jan 2015; 19:00	Game 6	Greece	13 (8)–15 (9)	Hungary	Athens, Greece
20 Jan 2015; 19:00	Game 6	Score by quarters: 5–4, 3–5, 3–3, 2–3			Athens, Greece

17 Feb 2015; 17:30	Game 7	Romania	12 (5)–18 (7)	Greece	Bucharest, Romania
17 Feb 2015; 17:30	Game 7	Score by quarters: 2–3, 3–4, 4–7, 3–4			Bucharest, Romania

17 Feb 2015; 18:00	Game 8	Slovakia	12 (4)–13 (4)	Hungary	Košice, Slovakia
17 Feb 2015; 18:00	Game 8	Score by quarters: 2–1, 2–3, 3–5, 5–4			Košice, Slovakia

17 Mar 2015; 18:00	Game 9	Romania	5 (3)–14 (7)	Hungary	Bucharest, Romania
17 Mar 2015; 18:00	Game 9	Score by quarters: 2–2, 1–5, 1–3, 1–4			Bucharest, Romania

17 Mar 2015; 19:00	Game 10	Greece	11 (6)–6 (3)	Slovakia	Athens, Greece
17 Mar 2015; 19:00	Game 10	Score by quarters: 2–2, 4–1, 3–1, 2–2			Athens, Greece

14 Apr 2015; 18:00	Game 11	Slovakia	8 (5)–9 (4)	Romania	Bratislava, Slovakia
14 Apr 2015; 18:00	Game 11	Score by quarters: 2–1, 3–3, 2–3, 1–2			Bratislava, Slovakia

14 Apr 2015; 18:15	Game 12	Hungary	12 (6)–11 (3)	Greece	Győr, Hungary
14 Apr 2015; 18:15	Game 12	Score by quarters: 2–1, 4–2, 2–3, 4–5			Győr, Hungary

==== Group B ====
Team	GP	W	L	GF	GA	GD	Pts
Serbia	6	6	0	85	46	+39	18
Russia	6	4	2	64	63	+1	12
Spain	6	2	4	55	66	-11	6
Germany	6	0	6	53	82	-29	0

18 Nov 2014; 18:00	Game 1	Serbia	9 (5)–1 (1)	Spain	Niš, Serbia
18 Nov 2014; 18:00	Game 1	Score by quarters: 5–1, 0–0, 0–0, 4–0			Niš, Serbia

18 Nov 2014; 19:00	Game 2	Russia	12 (6)–9 (4)	Germany	Volgograd, Russia
18 Nov 2014; 19:00	Game 2	Score by quarters: 2–2, 4–2, 4–3, 2–2			Volgograd, Russia

9 Dec 2014; 19:00	Game 3	Germany	10 (6)–19 (8)	Serbia	Hamburg, Germany
9 Dec 2014; 19:00	Game 3	Score by quarters: 4–3, 2–5, 3–6, 1–5			Hamburg, Germany

9 Dec 2014; 20:00	Game 4	Spain	11 (8)–14 (5)	Russia	Terrassa, Spain
9 Dec 2014; 20:00	Game 4	Score by quarters: 4–2, 4–3, 1–3, 2–6			Terrassa, Spain

20 Jan 2015; 18:30	Game 5	Russia	8 (3)–17 (8)	Serbia	Astrakhan, Russia
20 Jan 2015; 18:30	Game 5	Score by quarters: 2–4, 1–4, 2–5, 3–4			Astrakhan, Russia

20 Jan 2015; 19:00	Game 6	Germany	11 (5)–12 (8)	Spain	Bremen, Germany
20 Jan 2015; 19:00	Game 6	Score by quarters: 2–3, 3–5, 1–2, 5–2			Bremen, Germany

17 Feb 2015; 19:00	Game 7	Spain	9 (5)–15 (4)	Serbia	Madrid, Spain
17 Feb 2015; 19:00	Game 7	Score by quarters: 3–2, 2–2, 2–5, 2–6			Madrid, Spain

17 Feb 2015; 19:30	Game 8	Germany	7 (4)–11 (4)	Russia	Stuttgart, Germany
17 Feb 2015; 19:30	Game 8	Score by quarters: 1–2, 3–2, 1–3, 2–4			Stuttgart, Germany

17 Mar 2015; 18:00	Game 9	Serbia	14 (7)–8 (5)	Germany	Kragujevac, Serbia
17 Mar 2015; 18:00	Game 9	Score by quarters: 3–3, 4–2, 3–1, 4–2			Kragujevac, Serbia

17 Mar 2015; 19:00	Game 10	Russia	9 (7)–8 (6)	Spain	Volgograd, Russia
17 Mar 2015; 19:00	Game 10	Score by quarters: 3–3, 4–3, 1–1, 1–1			Volgograd, Russia

14 Apr 2015; 19:00	Game 11	Serbia	11 (6)–10 (4)	Russia	Kruševac, Serbia
14 Apr 2015; 19:00	Game 11	Score by quarters: 2–3, 4–1, 2–2, 3–4			Kruševac, Serbia

14 Apr 2015; 20:30	Game 12	Spain	14 (9)–8 (4)	Germany	Barcelona, Spain
14 Apr 2015; 20:30	Game 12	Score by quarters: 5–4, 4–0, 3–4, 2–0			Barcelona, Spain

==== Group C ====
Team	GP	W	L	GF	GA	GD	Pts
Croatia	8	8	0	101	60	+41	24
Italy (H)	8	6	2	108	71	+37	17
Montenegro	8	4	4	94	81	+13	13
France	8	1	7	71	97	-26	3
Turkey	8	1	7	40	105	-65	3

(H)–Host Super Final

18 Nov 2014; 20:30	Game 1	Croatia	13 (6)–3 (0)	Turkey	Zagreb, Croatia
18 Nov 2014; 20:30	Game 1	Score by quarters: 3–0, 3–0, 4–1, 3–2			Zagreb, Croatia

18 Nov 2014; 20:30	Game 2	France	9 (4)–15 (6)	Italy	Aix-en-Provence, France
18 Nov 2014; 20:30	Game 2	Score by quarters: 2–3, 2–3, 1–4, 4–5			Aix-en-Provence, France

9 Dec 2014; 18:00	Game 3	Montenegro	13 (6)–15 (4) (OT)	Italy	Budva, Montenegro
9 Dec 2014; 18:00	Game 3	Score by quarters: 3–1, 3–4, 1–4, 4–2 OT: 2–4			Budva, Montenegro

9 Dec 2014; 19:30	Game 4	France	7 (2)–14 (9)	Croatia	Montpellier, France
9 Dec 2014; 19:30	Game 4	Score by quarters: 2–5, 0–4, 4–3, 1–2			Montpellier, France

29 Dec 2014; 16:45	Game 5	Croatia	14 (6)–8 (4)	Montenegro	Rijeka, Croatia
29 Dec 2014; 16:45	Game 5	Score by quarters: 2–2, 4–2, 3–2, 5–2			Rijeka, Croatia

20 Jan 2015; 17:00	Game 6	Montenegro	15 (7)–4 (0)	Turkey	Budva, Montenegro
20 Jan 2015; 17:00	Game 6	Score by quarters: 4–0, 3–0, 3–1, 5–3			Budva, Montenegro

20 Jan 2015; 20:00	Game 7	Italy	7 (4)–8 (5)	Croatia	Turin, Italy
20 Jan 2015; 20:00	Game 7	Score by quarters: 2–3, 2–2, 1–2, 2–1			Turin, Italy

2 Feb 2015; 21:00	Game 8	Turkey	9 (1)–7 (3)	France	Istanbul, Turkey
2 Feb 2015; 21:00	Game 8	Score by quarters: 1–1, 0–2, 6–2, 2–2			Istanbul, Turkey

17 Feb 2015; 19:00	Game 9	Montenegro	13 (6)–7 (4)	France	Budva, Montenegro
17 Feb 2015; 19:00	Game 9	Score by quarters: 1–2, 5–2, 3–2, 4–1			Budva, Montenegro

17 Feb 2015; 21:00	Game 10	Turkey	3 (1)–16 (7)	Italy	Istanbul, Turkey
17 Feb 2015; 21:00	Game 10	Score by quarters: 1–3, 0–4, 1–5, 1–4			Istanbul, Turkey

19 Feb 2015; 20:00	Game 11	Italy	11 (5)–10 (6)	France	Lodi, Italy
19 Feb 2015; 20:00	Game 11	Score by quarters: 3–3, 2–3, 3–1, 3–3			Lodi, Italy

20 Feb 2015; 21:00	Game 12	Turkey	4 (2)–11 (6)	Croatia	Istanbul, Turkey
20 Feb 2015; 21:00	Game 12	Score by quarters: 1–4, 1–2, 0–1, 2–4			Istanbul, Turkey

17 Mar 2015; 18:00	Game 13	Croatia	15 (7)–9 (4)	France	Varaždin, Croatia
17 Mar 2015; 18:00	Game 13	Score by quarters: 4–1, 3–3, 2–3, 6–2			Varaždin, Croatia

17 Mar 2015; 20:00	Game 14	Italy	16 (8)–8 (3)	Montenegro	Genoa, Italia
17 Mar 2015; 20:00	Game 14	Score by quarters: 3–2, 5–1, 5–2, 3–3			Genoa, Italia

20 Mar 2015; 18:00	Game 15	Montenegro	11 (5)–12 (4)	Croatia	Budva, Montenegro
20 Mar 2015; 18:00	Game 15	Score by quarters: 2–3, 3–1, 2–4, 4–4			Budva, Montenegro

20 Mar 2015; 20:30	Game 16	France	14 (6)–6 (4)	Turkey	Paris, France
20 Mar 2015; 20:30	Game 16	Score by quarters: 1–4, 5–0, 2–1, 6–1			Paris, France

31 Mar 2015; 18:00	Game 17	Italy	17 (7)–6 (4)	Turkey	Syracuse, Italy
31 Mar 2015; 18:00	Game 17	Score by quarters: 6–2, 1–2, 4–1, 6–1			Syracuse, Italy

31 Mar 2015; 20:00	Game 18	France	8 (5)–14 (7)	Montenegro	Nancy, France
31 Mar 2015; 20:00	Game 18	Score by quarters: 0–3, 5–4, 1–3, 2–4			Nancy, France

14 Apr 2015; 18:00	Game 19	Croatia	14 (8)–11 (3)	Italy	Split, Croatia
14 Apr 2015; 18:00	Game 19	Score by quarters: 3–1, 5–2, 1–4, 5–4			Split, Croatia

14 Apr 2015; 21:00	Game 20	Turkey	5 (3)–12 (5)	Montenegro	Istanbul, Turkey
14 Apr 2015; 21:00	Game 20	Score by quarters: 2–3, 1–2, 1–3, 1–4			Istanbul, Turkey

== Intercontinental Qualification Tournament ==
=== Preliminary round ===
==== Group A ====
Team	GP	W	L	GF	GA	GD	Pts
Canada	3	3	0	45	25	+20	9
United States	3	2	1	38	24	+14	6
Japan	3	1	2	30	39	-9	3
Argentina	3	0	3	23	48	-25	0

30 Mar 2015; 18:30	Game 1	Japan	14 (9)–9 (5)	Argentina	Newport Beach, United States
30 Mar 2015; 18:30	Game 1	Score by quarters: 4–4, 5–1, 2–1, 3–3			Newport Beach, United States

30 Mar 2015; 20:30	Game 2	Canada	10 (7)–9 (3)	United States	Newport Beach, United States
30 Mar 2015; 20:30	Game 2	Score by quarters: 4–2, 3–1, 0–5, 3–1			Newport Beach, United States

31 Mar 2015; 17:00	Game 3	Canada	15 (7)–6 (4)	Argentina	Newport Beach, United States
31 Mar 2015; 17:00	Game 3	Score by quarters: 4–3, 3–1, 3–0, 5–2			Newport Beach, United States

31 Mar 2015; 20:00	Game 4	Japan	6 (2)–10 (4)	United States	Newport Beach, United States
31 Mar 2015; 20:00	Game 4	Score by quarters: 2–3, 0–1, 3–4, 1–2			Newport Beach, United States

1 Apr 2015; 17:00	Game 5	Canada	20 (8)–10 (5)	Japan	Newport Beach, United States
1 Apr 2015; 17:00	Game 5	Score by quarters: 4–2, 4–3, 6–3, 6–2			Newport Beach, United States

1 Apr 2015; 20:00	Game 6	United States	19 (10)–8 (5)	Argentina	Newport Beach, United States
1 Apr 2015; 20:00	Game 6	Score by quarters: 5–4, 5–1, 5–2, 4–1			Newport Beach, United States

==== Group B ====
Team	GP	W	L	GF	GA	GD	Pts
Australia	3	3	0	36	20	+16	9
Brazil	3	2	1	32	29	+3	6
Kazakhstan	3	1	2	24	32	-8	3
China	3	0	3	21	32	-11	0

30 Mar 2015; 15:30	Game 1	Brazil	10 (7)–13 (6)	Australia	Newport Beach, United States
30 Mar 2015; 15:30	Game 1	Score by quarters: 3–2, 4–4, 1–5, 2–2			Newport Beach, United States

30 Mar 2015; 17:00	Game 2	Kazakhstan	10 (6)–9 (8)	China	Newport Beach, United States
30 Mar 2015; 17:00	Game 2	Score by quarters: 2–5, 4–3, 2–0, 2–1			Newport Beach, United States

31 Mar 2015; 15:30	Game 3	Brazil	12 (6)–9 (4)	China	Newport Beach, United States
31 Mar 2015; 15:30	Game 3	Score by quarters: 3–1, 3–3, 3–3, 3–2			Newport Beach, United States

31 Mar 2015; 18:30	Game 4	Kazakhstan	7 (3)–13 (6)	Australia	Newport Beach, United States
31 Mar 2015; 18:30	Game 4	Score by quarters: 2–5, 1–1, 2–4, 2–3			Newport Beach, United States

1 Apr 2015; 15:30	Game 5	Brazil	10 (7)–7 (3)	Kazakhstan	Newport Beach, United States
1 Apr 2015; 15:30	Game 5	Score by quarters: 1–2, 6–1, 1–2, 2–2			Newport Beach, United States

1 Apr 2015; 18:30	Game 6	Australia	10 (6)–3 (3)	China	Newport Beach, United States
1 Apr 2015; 18:30	Game 6	Score by quarters: 4–0, 2–3, 2–0, 2–0			Newport Beach, United States

=== Knockout stage ===
Quarterfinals
A2	United States	17
B3	Kazakhstan	11
A4	Argentina	5
B1	Australia	14
A3	Japan	8
B2	Brazil	11
A1	Canada	10
B4	China	11

Semifinals
A2	United States	16
B1	Australia*	17
B2	Brazil	14
B4	China	12

Final
B1	Australia	9
B2	Brazil	6
Third place
A2	United States	19
B4	China	7

==== Quarterfinals ====
2 Apr 2015; 15:30	Game 1	Japan	8 (4)–11 (6)	Brazil	Newport Beach, United States
2 Apr 2015; 15:30	Game 1	Score by quarters: 3–2, 1–4, 2–3, 2–2			Newport Beach, United States

2 Apr 2015; 17:00	Game 2	Canada	10 (4)–11 (9)	China	Newport Beach, United States
2 Apr 2015; 17:00	Game 2	Score by quarters: 1–6, 3–3, 3–2, 3–0			Newport Beach, United States

2 Apr 2015; 18:30	Game 3	United States	17 (9)–11 (5)	Kazakhstan	Newport Beach, United States
2 Apr 2015; 18:30	Game 3	Score by quarters: 4–3, 5–2, 5–2, 3–4			Newport Beach, United States

2 Apr 2015; 20:00	Game 4	Argentina	5 (3)–14 (6)	Australia	Newport Beach, United States
2 Apr 2015; 20:00	Game 4	Score by quarters: 1–2, 2–4, 2–3, 0–5			Newport Beach, United States

==== Semifinals ====
3 Apr 2015; 18:30	Game 1	United States	16 (7)–17 (7) (OT)	Australia	Newport Beach, United States
3 Apr 2015; 18:30	Game 1	Score by quarters: 4–3, 3–4, 2–1, 4–5 OT: 3–4			Newport Beach, United States

3 Apr 2015; 20:00	Game 2	Brazil	14 (8)–12 (6)	China	Newport Beach, United States
3 Apr 2015; 20:00	Game 2	Score by quarters: 5–5, 3–1, 4–4, 2–2			Newport Beach, United States

==== 3rd Place ====
4 Apr 2015; 12:00	Game 1	United States	19 (11)–7 (2)	China	Newport Beach, United States
4 Apr 2015; 12:00	Game 1	Score by quarters: 7–1, 4–1, 4–2, 4–3			Newport Beach, United States

==== Final ====
4 Apr 2015; 13:30	Game 1	Australia	9 (6)–6 (3)	Brazil	Newport Beach, United States
4 Apr 2015; 13:30	Game 1	Score by quarters: 2–1, 4–2, 3–1, 0–2			Newport Beach, United States

=== 5th-8th Places ===
5th–8th Places Semifinals
Kazakhstan	19
Argentina	8
Japan	11
Canada	10

5th Place
Kazakhstan	12
Japan	15
7th Place
Argentina	5
Canada	18

==== 5th-8th Places Semifinals ====
3 Apr 2015; 15:30	Game 1	Kazakhstan	19 (11)–8 (5)	Argentina	Newport Beach, United States
3 Apr 2015; 15:30	Game 1	Score by quarters: 6–3, 5–2, 5–2, 3–1			Newport Beach, United States

3 Apr 2015; 17:00	Game 2	Japan	11 (6)–10 (6)	Canada	Newport Beach, United States
3 Apr 2015; 17:00	Game 2	Score by quarters: 4–3, 2–3, 2–2, 3–2			Newport Beach, United States

==== 7th Place ====
4 Apr 2015; 09:00	Game 1	Argentina	5 (2)–18 (10)	Canada	Newport Beach, United States
4 Apr 2015; 09:00	Game 1	Score by quarters: 1–5, 1–5, 1–5, 2–3			Newport Beach, United States

==== 5th Place ====
4 Apr 2015; 10:30	Game 1	Kazakhstan	12 (5)–15 (7)	Japan	Newport Beach, United States
4 Apr 2015; 10:30	Game 1	Score by quarters: 2–4, 3–3, 3–3, 4–5			Newport Beach, United States

== Super Final ==
In the Super Final the eight qualifying teams are split into two groups of four teams with all teams progressing to the knock-out stage. The games were played in Bergamo, Italy from 23 to 28 June 2015.

=== Squads ===
==== Australia ====
Australia

No.	Name	Date of birth	Position	L/R	Height	Weight
1	Joel Dennerley	25 June 1987	Goalkeeper	R		
2	Richie Campbell	18 September 1987		R		
3	George Ford	24 February 1993		R		
4	Johnno Cotterill	27 October 1989		R		
5	Nathan Power	13 February 1993		R		
6	Jarrod Gilchrist	13 June 1990		R		
7	Aidan Roach	7 September 1990		R		
8	Aaron Younger	25 September 1991		R		
9	Joel Swift	14 June 1990		R		
10	Martin Tyler	3 January 1991		R		
11	Rhys Howden	2 April 1987		R		
12	William Miller	21 February 1988		R		
13	James Clark	22 March 1991	Goalkeeper	R		

==== Brazil ====
Brazil

No.	Name	Date of birth	Position	L/R	Height	Weight
1	Vinicius Antonelli	1 March 1990	Goalkeeper	R		
2	Jonas Crivella	30 April 1988		R		
3	Guilherme Gomes	12 July 1996		R		
4	Ives Alonso	12 October 1980		R		
5	Paulo Salemi	8 August 1993		R		
6	Bernardo Gomes	12 November 1993		R		
7	Adrian Delgado	7 April 1990		R		
8	Felipe Santos	8 August 1984		R		
9	Bernardo Rocha	3 July 1989		R		
10	Felipe Perrone	27 February 1986		R		
11	Gustavo Guimaraes	24 January 1994		R		
12	Josip Vrlić	25 April 1986		R		
13	Thye Bezerra	22 August 1987	Goalkeeper	R		

==== China ====
China

No.	Name	Date of birth	Position	L/R	Height	Weight
1	Wu Honghui	10 April 1980	Goalkeeper	R		
2	Tan Feihu	1 January 1987		R		
3	Hu Zhangxin	14 June 1991		R		
4	Dong Tao	21 December 1990		R		
5	Lu Wenhui	19 May 1994		R		
6	Li Li	28 February 1988		R		
7	Chen Zhongxian	12 June 1996		R		
8	Gu Liang	21 October 1991		R		
9	Xie Ze Kai	15 February 1996		R		
10	Chen Jinghao	1 August 1989		R		
11	Zhang Chu Feng	7 September 1989		R		
12	Nianxiang Liang	6 September 1990		R		
13	Zhiwei Liang	15 October 1992	Goalkeeper	R		

==== Croatia ====
Croatia

No.	Name	Date of birth	Position	L/R	Height	Weight
1	Josip Pavić	15 January 1982	Goalkeeper	R		
2	Damir Burić	2 December 1980		R	205 cm (6 ft 9 in)	117 kg (258 lb)
3	Antonio Petković	11 January 1986		R		
4	Luka Lončar	26 June 1987		R		
5	Maro Joković	1 October 1987		R	203 cm (6 ft 8 in)	96 kg (212 lb)
6	Luka Bukić	30 April 1994		R		
7	Ante Vukičević	24 February 1993		R		
8	Andro Bušlje	4 January 1986		R		
9	Sandro Sukno	30 June 1990		R	201 cm (6 ft 7 in)	103 kg (227 lb)
10	Fran Paškvalin	22 November 1984		R		
11	Anđelo Šetka	14 September 1985		R	186 cm (6 ft 1 in)	87 kg (192 lb)
12	Paulo Obradović	9 March 1986		R		
13	Marko Bijač	12 January 1991	Goalkeeper	R		

==== Hungary ====
Hungary

No.	Name	Date of birth	Position	L/R	Height	Weight
1	Viktor Nagy	24 July 1984	Goalkeeper	R		
2	Miklós Gór-Nagy	8 January 1983		R		
3	Norbert Madaras	1 December 1979		R	191 cm (6 ft 3 in)	91 kg (201 lb)
4	Balázs Erdélyi	16 February 1990		R		
5	Márton Vámos	24 June 1992		R	199 cm (6 ft 6 in)	
6	Norbert Hosnyánszky	4 March 1984		R		
7	Ferenc Salamon	11 November 1988		R		
8	Dániel Angyal	29 March 1992		R		
9	Dániel Varga	25 September 1983		R		
10	Dénes Varga	29 March 1987		R	193 cm (6 ft 4 in)	95 kg (209 lb)
11	Toni Német	14 January 1994		R		
12	Balázs Hárai	5 April 1987		R		
13	Attila Decker	25 August 1987	Goalkeeper	R		

==== Italy ====
Italy

No.	Name	Date of birth	Position	L/R	Height	Weight
1	Stefano Tempesti	9 June 1979	Goalkeeper	R	203 cm (6 ft 8 in)	97 kg (214 lb)
2	Francesco Di Fulvio	15 August 1993		R	188 cm (6 ft 2 in)	82 kg (181 lb)
3	Alessandro Velotto	12 February 1995		R	185 cm (6 ft 1 in)	79 kg (174 lb)
4	Pietro Figlioli	29 May 1984		R	192 cm (6 ft 4 in)	97 kg (214 lb)
5	Alex Giorgetti	24 December 1987		R	186 cm (6 ft 1 in)	78 kg (172 lb)
6	Andrea Fondelli	27 February 1994		R	183 cm (6 ft 0 in)	83 kg (183 lb)
7	Nicholas Presciutti	14 December 1993		R	183 cm (6 ft 0 in)	92 kg (203 lb)
8	Valentino Gallo	17 July 1985		R		
9	Niccolo' Gitto	12 October 1986		R	190 cm (6 ft 3 in)	89 kg (196 lb)
10	Stefano Luongo	5 January 1990		R		
11	Matteo Aicardi	19 April 1986		R	192 cm (6 ft 4 in)	104 kg (229 lb)
12	Fabio Baraldi	21 March 1990		R		
13	Marco Del Lungo	1 March 1990	Goalkeeper	R	190 cm (6 ft 3 in)	93 kg (205 lb)

==== Serbia ====
Serbia

No.	Name	Date of birth	Position	L/R	Height	Weight
1	Gojko Pijetlović	7 August 1983	Goalkeeper	R		
2	Dušan Mandić	16 June 1994		R		
3	Živko Gocic	22 August 1982		R		
4	Sava Ranđelović	17 July 1993		R		
5	Milos Ćuk	21 December 1990		R		
6	Duško Pijetlović	25 April 1985		R		
7	Slobodan Nikić	25 January 1983		R		
8	Milan Aleksić	13 May 1986		R		
9	Nikola Jakšić	17 January 1997		R		
10	Filip Filipović	2 May 1987		R		
11	Andrija Prlainović	28 April 1987		R		
12	Stefan Mitrović	29 March 1988		R		
13	Branislav Mitrović	30 January 1985	Goalkeeper	R		

==== United States ====
United States

No.	Name	Date of birth	Position	L/R	Height	Weight
1	Merrill Moses	13 August 1977	Goalkeeper	R		
2	Connor Virjee	16 March 1992		R		
3	Alex Obert	18 December 1991		R		
4	Jackson Kimbell	19 September 1994		R		
5	Alex Roelse	19 January 1995		R		
6	Luca Cupido	9 November 1995		R		
7	Josh Samuels	8 July 1991		R		
8	Tony Azevedo	21 November 1981		R		
9	Alex Bowen	4 September 1993		R		
10	Bret Bonanni	20 January 1994		R		
11	Jesse Smith	27 April 1983		R		
12	John Mann	27 June 1985		R		
13	Baron McQuin	27 October 1995	Goalkeeper	R		

=== Preliminary round ===
==== Group A ====
Team	GP	W	L	GF	GA	GD	Pts
Hungary	3	2	1	46	26	+20	6
Brazil	3	2	1	35	33	+2	6
Croatia	3	2	1	39	33	+6	6
China	3	0	3	19	47	–28	0

23 June 2015; 17:20	Game 1	Hungary	18 (9)–8 (3)	China	Bergamo, Italy
23 June 2015; 17:20	Game 1	Score by quarters: 4–2, 5–1, 3–5, 6–0			Bergamo, Italy

23 June 2015; 18:40	Game 2	Brazil	17 (9)–10 (5)	Croatia	Bergamo, Italy
23 June 2015; 18:40	Game 2	Score by quarters: 3–3, 6–2, 6–1, 2–4			Bergamo, Italy

24 June 2015; 16:00	Game 3	Brazil	15 (9)–7 (5)	China	Bergamo, Italy
24 June 2015; 16:00	Game 3	Score by quarters: 3–2, 6–3, 4–1, 2–1			Bergamo, Italy

24 June 2015; 17:20	Game 4	Hungary	12 (5)–15 (9)	Croatia	Bergamo, Italy
24 June 2015; 17:20	Game 4	Score by quarters: 2–5, 3–4, 3–3, 4–3			Bergamo, Italy

25 June 2015; 17:20	Game 5	Hungary	16 (9)–3 (2)	Brazil	Bergamo, Italy
25 June 2015; 17:20	Game 5	Score by quarters: 3–1, 6–1, 4–1, 3–0			Bergamo, Italy

25 June 2015; 18:40	Game 6	China	4 (1)–14 (7)	Croatia	Bergamo, Italy
25 June 2015; 18:40	Game 6	Score by quarters: 1–3, 0–4, 2–3, 1–4			Bergamo, Italy

==== Group B ====
Team	GP	W	L	GF	GA	GD	Pts
Serbia	3	3	0	40	26	+14	9
Italy	3	2	1	31	30	+1	6
Australia	3	1	2	23	28	–5	3
United States	3	0	3	26	36	–10	0

23 June 2015; 16:00	Game 1	Serbia	13 (9)–7 (3)	United States	Bergamo, Italy
23 June 2015; 16:00	Game 1	Score by quarters: 6–3, 3–0, 3–1, 1–3			Bergamo, Italy

23 June 2015; 20:00	Game 2	Australia	5 (3)–7 (1)	Italy	Bergamo, Italy
23 June 2015; 20:00	Game 2	Score by quarters: 1–0, 2–1, 0–5, 2–1			Bergamo, Italy

24 June 2015; 18:40	Game 3	Australia	10 (4)–9 (1)	United States	Bergamo, Italy
24 June 2015; 18:40	Game 3	Score by quarters: 2–1, 2–0, 2–4, 4–4			Bergamo, Italy

24 June 2015; 20:00	Game 4	Serbia	15 (8)–11 (5)	Italy	Bergamo, Italy
24 June 2015; 20:00	Game 4	Score by quarters: 5–2, 3–3, 1–3, 6–3			Bergamo, Italy

25 June 2015; 16:00	Game 5	Serbia	12 (6)–8 (5)	Australia	Bergamo, Italy
25 June 2015; 16:00	Game 5	Score by quarters: 2–2, 4–3, 3–1, 3–2			Bergamo, Italy

25 June 2015; 20:00	Game 6	United States	10 (3)–13 (7)	Italy	Bergamo, Italy
25 June 2015; 20:00	Game 6	Score by quarters: 3–3, 0–4, 3–2, 4–4			Bergamo, Italy

=== Knockout stage ===
Quarterfinals
2A	Brazil	9
3B	Australia	8
4A	China	10
1B	Serbia	25
3A	Croatia (pen.)	10^{(4)}
2B	Italy	10^{(2)}
1A	Hungary	7
4B	United States	8

Semifinals
2A	Brazil	9
1B	Serbia	13
3A	Croatia	11
4B	United States	6

Final
1B	Serbia	9
3A	Croatia	6
Third place
2A	Brazil (pen.)	10^{(14)}
4B	United States	10^{(13)}

==== Quarterfinals ====
26 June 2015; 16:00	Game 1	Brazil	9 (3)–8 (4)	Australia	Bergamo, Italy
26 June 2015; 16:00	Game 1	Score by quarters: 1–2, 2–2, 4–2, 2–2			Bergamo, Italy

26 June 2015; 17:20	Game 2	Hungary	7 (3)–8 (3)	United States	Bergamo, Italy
26 June 2015; 17:20	Game 2	Score by quarters: 0–2, 3–1, 3–3, 1–2			Bergamo, Italy

26 June 2015; 18:40	Game 3	Croatia	14 (5)–12 (6) (OT)	Italy	Bergamo, Italy
26 June 2015; 18:40	Game 3	Score by quarters: 3–1, 2–5, 3–0, 2–4 OT: 4–2 (pen.)			Bergamo, Italy

26 June 2015; 20:00	Game 4	China	10 (5)–25 (13)	Serbia	Bergamo, Italy
26 June 2015; 20:00	Game 4	Score by quarters: 5–6, 0–7, 3–5, 2–7			Bergamo, Italy

=== 5th-8th Places ===
5th–8th Places Semifinals
Australia	13
China	3
Italy	5
Hungary	10

5th Place
Australia	9
Hungary	6
7th Place
China	9
Italy	16

==== 5th-8th Places Semifinals ====
27 June 2015; 16:00	Game 1	Australia	13 (7)–3 (2)	China	Bergamo, Italy
27 June 2015; 16:00	Game 1	Score by quarters: 5–1, 2–1, 3–1, 3–0			Bergamo, Italy

27 June 2015; 17:20	Game 2	Italy	5 (2)–10 (5)	Hungary	Bergamo, Italy
27 June 2015; 17:20	Game 2	Score by quarters: 1–3, 1–2, 1–3, 2–2			Bergamo, Italy

==== 7th Place ====
28 June 2015; 16:00	Game 1	China	9 (6)–16 (9)	Italy	Bergamo, Italy
28 June 2015; 16:00	Game 1	Score by quarters: 5–3, 1–6, 2–2, 1–5			Bergamo, Italy

==== 5th Place ====
28 June 2015; 17:20	Game 1	Australia	9 (3)–6 (3)	Hungary	Bergamo, Italy
28 June 2015; 17:20	Game 1	Score by quarters: 2–1, 1–2, 4–2, 2–1			Bergamo, Italy

=== Finals ===
Semifinals
Brazil	9
Serbia	13
Croatia	11
United States	6

Final
Serbia	9
Croatia	6
3rd Place
Brazil (pen.)	10^{(14)}
United States	10^{(13)}

==== Semifinals ====
27 June 2015; 18:40	Game 1	Brazil	9 (4)–13 (5)	Serbia	Bergamo, Italy
27 June 2015; 18:40	Game 1	Score by quarters: 3–4, 1–1, 2–5, 3–3			Bergamo, Italy

27 June 2015; 20:00	Game 2	Croatia	11 (5)–6 (4)	United States	Bergamo, Italy
27 June 2015; 20:00	Game 2	Score by quarters: 2–2, 3–2, 2–0, 4–2			Bergamo, Italy

==== 3rd Place ====
28 June 2015; 18:40	Game 1	Brazil	24 (2)–23 (6) (OT)	United States	Bergamo, Italy
28 June 2015; 18:40	Game 1	Score by quarters: 1–3, 1–3, 3–2, 5–2 OT: 14–13 (pen.)			Bergamo, Italy

==== Final ====
28 June 2015; 20:00	Game 1	Serbia	9 (2)–6 (4)	Croatia	Bergamo, Italy
28 June 2015; 20:00	Game 1	Score by quarters: 1–1, 1–3, 3–1, 4–1			Bergamo, Italy

== Final ranking ==
RANK	TEAM
	Serbia
	Croatia
	Brazil
4.	United States
5.	Australia
6.	Hungary
7.	Italy
8.	China

2015 FINA Men's World League

Serbia
Ninth title

Top Scorer	Player of the Tournament	Goalkeeper of the Tournament
(United States) Tony Azevedo	(Serbia) Dušan Mandić	(Croatia) Josip Pavić
