= 2016 FINA Men's Water Polo World League =

- League: FINA Water Polo World League
- Sport: Water Polo

FINA Men's Water Polo World League seasons
- ← 2015 2017 →

The 2016 FINA Men's Water Polo World League was the 15th edition of the annual men's international water polo tournament. It was played between October 2015 and June 2016 and opened to all men's water polo national teams. After participating in a preliminary round, eight teams qualify to play in a final tournament, called the Super Final in Huizhou, China from 21–26 June 2016.

In the world league, there are specific rules that do not allow matches to end in a draw. If teams are level at the end of the 4th quarter of any world league match, the match will be decided by a penalty shootout. Teams earn points in the standings in group matches as follows:

- Match won in normal time - 3 points
- Match won in shootout - 2 points
- Match lost in shootout - 1 point
- Match lost in normal time - 0 points

== Europe ==
=== Preliminary round ===
The European preliminary round consisted of three group of four teams. The winner of each group after the home and away series of games qualified for the Super Final.

==== Group A ====
Team	GP	W	L	GF	GA	GD	Pts
Greece	6	5	1	81	48	+33	15
Hungary	6	5	1	89	57	+32	15
Romania	6	2	4	54	76	-22	6
Georgia	6	0	6	57	100	-43	0

20 Oct 2015	Hungary	17–10	Georgia	Tiszaligeti uszoda, Szolnok

20 Oct 2015	Greece	17–3	Romania	Athens

17 Nov 2015	Hungary	16–8	Romania	Kecskeméti Fürdő, Kecskemét

17 Nov 2015	Greece	18–10	Georgia	Athens

1 Dec 2015	Greece	12–8	Hungary	Patras

1 Dec 2015	Georgia	11–13	Romania	Tbilisi

16 Feb 2016	Georgia	10–20	Hungary	Tbilisi

16 Feb 2016	Romania	6–9	Greece	Bucharest

26 Apr 2016	Romania	7–15	Hungary	Oradea

26 Apr 2016	Georgia	8–15	Greece	Tbilisi

10 May 2016	Hungary	13–10	Greece	Városi Sportuszoda, Szentes

10 May 2016	Romania	17–8	Georgia	Bucharest

==== Group B ====
Team	GP	W	L	GF	GA	GD	Pts
Serbia	6	5	1	79	69	+10	16
Montenegro	6	4	2	73	55	+18	11
Spain	6	3	3	67	63	+4	9
France	6	0	6	50	82	-32	0

20 Oct 2015	Serbia	12–9	France	Belgrade

20 Oct 2015	Montenegro	11–6	Spain	Herceg Novi

17 Nov 2015	Serbia	13–12	Spain	Novi Sad

1 Dec 2015	Spain	18–10	France	Barcelona

1 Dec 2015	Montenegro	10–12	Serbia	Budva

16 Feb 2016	France	10–15	Serbia	Strasbourg

16 Feb 2016	Spain	10–8	Montenegro	Sabadell

14 Mar 2016	France	10–12	Montenegro	Nice

26 Apr 2016	Spain	13–14	Serbia	Barcelona

26 Apr 2016	Montenegro	17–4	France	Herceg Novi

10 May 2016	France	7–8	Spain	Limoges

10 May 2016	Serbia	^{(3)} 10–10 ^{(5)}	Montenegro	Banja Luka

==== Group C ====
Team	GP	W	L	GF	GA	GD	Pts
Italy	6	6	0	89	51	+38	17
Croatia	6	4	2	86	51	+35	13
Russia	6	2	4	65	75	-10	6
Turkey	6	0	6	34	97	-63	0

20 Oct 2015	Croatia	19–6	Turkey	Šibenik

20 Oct 2015	Russia	11–16	Italy	Moscow

17 Nov 2015	Croatia	17–9	Russia	Zadar

17 Nov 2015	Italy	14–4	Turkey	Rome

1 Dec 2015	Russia	13–9	Turkey	Moscow

1 Dec 2015	Croatia	8–9	Italy	Dubrovnik

16 Feb 2016	Turkey	3–16	Croatia	Ankara

16 Feb 2016	Italy	14–9	Russia	Turin

26 Apr 2016	Russia	10–14	Croatia	Moscow

26 Apr 2016	Turkey	7–22	Italy	Bursa

3 May 2016	Turkey	5–13	Russia	Antalya

10 May 2016	Italy	^{(5)} 9–9 ^{(3)}	Croatia	Syracuse

== Intercontinental Qualification Tournament ==
=== Preliminary round ===
Team	GP	W	L	GF	GA	GD	Pts
United States	5	5	0	79	40	+39	15
Australia	5	4	1	58	30	+28	12
Brazil	5	3	2	72	50	+22	9
Japan	5	2	3	69	52	+17	6
Kazakhstan	5	1	4	40	78	-38	3
China	5	0	5	25	93	-68	0

10 May 2016	United States	8–6	Australia	Yokohama, Japan

10 May 2016	Kazakhstan	7–19	Brazil	Yokohama, Japan

10 May 2016	Japan	21–5	China	Yokohama, Japan

11 May 2016	Australia	13–9	Brazil	Yokohama, Japan

11 May 2016	China	10–15	Kazakhstan	Yokohama, Japan

11 May 2016	United States	17–14	Japan	Yokohama, Japan

12 May 2016	Brazil	17–4	China	Yokohama, Japan

12 May 2016	Kazakhstan	7–19	United States	Yokohama, Japan

12 May 2016	Japan	5–7	Australia	Yokohama, Japan

13 May 2016	United States	16–11	Brazil	Yokohama, Japan

13 May 2016	China	4–21	Australia	Yokohama, Japan

13 May 2016	Japan	19–7	Kazakhstan	Yokohama, Japan

14 May 2016	Kazakhstan	4–11	Australia	Yokohama, Japan

14 May 2016	United States	19–2	China	Yokohama, Japan

14 May 2016	Brazil	16–10	Japan	Yokohama, Japan

==== 5th Place ====
15 May 2016	Kazakhstan	16–7	China	Yokohama, Japan

==== 3rd Place ====
15 May 2016	Brazil	13–12	Japan	Yokohama, Japan

==== Final ====
15 May 2016	United States	10–9	Australia	Yokohama, Japan

== Super Final ==
In the Super Final the eight qualifying teams are split into two groups of four teams with all teams progressing to the knock-out stage. The games were played in Huizhou, China from 21 to 26 June 2016.

=== Qualified teams ===
Africa	Americas	Asia	Europe	Oceania
—	Brazil; United States	China (Host); Japan	Greece; Italy; Serbia	Australia

=== Group A ===
Team	GP	W	L	GF	GA	GD	Pts
Greece	3	3	0	40	16	+24	9
Italy	3	2	1	35	32	+3	6
Australia	3	1	2	25	31	-6	3
Japan	3	0	3	24	45	-21	0

21 Jun 2016	Greece	15–7	Japan	Huizhou, China
21 Jun 2016	Score by quarters: 3–1, 4–1, 3–2, 5–3			Huizhou, China

21 Jun 2016	Australia	7–14	Italy	Huizhou, China
21 Jun 2016	Score by quarters: 2–3, 2–3, 2–4, 1–4			Huizhou, China

22 Jun 2016	Australia	13–7	Japan	Huizhou, China
22 Jun 2016	Score by quarters: 3–3, 3–2, 5–1, 2–1			Huizhou, China

22 Jun 2016	Greece	15–4	Italy	Huizhou, China
22 Jun 2016	Score by quarters: 4–0, 3–1, 4–1, 4–2			Huizhou, China

23 Jun 2016	Greece	10–5	Australia	Huizhou, China
23 Jun 2016	Score by quarters: 1–1, 3–1, 2–2, 4–1			Huizhou, China

23 Jun 2016	Japan	10–17	Italy	Huizhou, China
23 Jun 2016	Score by quarters: 1–3, 4–6, 1–4, 4–4			Huizhou, China

=== Group B ===
Team	GP	W	L	GF	GA	GD	Pts
Serbia	3	3	0	44	23	+21	9
United States	3	2	1	30	23	+7	6
Brazil	3	1	2	32	37	-5	2
China	3	0	3	24	47	-23	1

21 Jun 2016	Serbia	14–10	Brazil	Huizhou, China
21 Jun 2016	Score by quarters: 4–3, 4–3, 4–2, 2–2			Huizhou, China

21 Jun 2016	United States	12–6	China	Huizhou, China
21 Jun 2016	Score by quarters: 3–1, 3–1, 2–2, 4–2			Huizhou, China

22 Jun 2016	United States	10–7	Brazil	Huizhou, China
22 Jun 2016	Score by quarters: 3–2, 2–3, 3–1, 2–1			Huizhou, China

22 Jun 2016	Serbia	20–5	China	Huizhou, China
22 Jun 2016	Score by quarters: 5–2, 4–1, 6–1, 5–1			Huizhou, China

23 Jun 2016	Serbia	10–8	United States	Huizhou, China
23 Jun 2016	Score by quarters: 4–2, 3–2, 2–2, 1–2			Huizhou, China

23 Jun 2016	Brazil	11–11; PSO: 4–2	China	Huizhou, China
23 Jun 2016	Score by quarters: 2–2, 2–2, 3–4, 4–3			Huizhou, China

=== Knockout stage ===
Quarterfinals
Italy	12
Brazil	6
Japan	10
Serbia	19
Australia	8 (7)
United States (pen.)	8 (8)
Greece	15
China	5

Semifinals
Italy	4
Serbia	7
United States (pen.)	11 (6)
Greece	11 (5)

Final
Serbia	10
United States	6
Third place
Greece	11
Italy	7

5th–8th Places

Semifinals
Brazil	10
Japan	12
Australia	15
China	4

Fifth place
Japan	7
Australia	12
Seventh place
Brazil	16
China	4

==== Quarterfinals ====
24 Jun 2016	Italy	12–6	Brazil	Huizhou, China
24 Jun 2016	Score by quarters: 4–1, 2–3, 3–1, 3–1			Huizhou, China

24 Jun 2016	Australia	8–8; PSO: 7–8	United States	Huizhou, China
24 Jun 2016	Score by quarters: 1–2, 3–3, 0–1, 4–2			Huizhou, China

24 Jun 2016	Greece	15–5	China	Huizhou, China
24 Jun 2016	Score by quarters: 4–1, 5–2, 2–1, 4–1			Huizhou, China

24 Jun 2016	Japan	10–19	Serbia	Huizhou, China
24 Jun 2016	Score by quarters: 3–4, 1–7, 3–5, 3–3			Huizhou, China

==== 5th–8th Places Semifinals ====
25 Jun 2016	Brazil	10–12	Japan	Huizhou, China
25 Jun 2016	Score by quarters: 2–4, 1–6, 5–2, 2–0			Huizhou, China

25 Jun 2016	Australia	15–4	China	Huizhou, China
25 Jun 2016	Score by quarters: 5–1, 3–0, 3–2, 4–1			Huizhou, China

==== Semifinals ====
25 Jun 2016	Italy	4–7	Serbia	Huizhou, China
25 Jun 2016	Score by quarters: 1–2, 1–2, 1–1, 1–2			Huizhou, China

25 Jun 2016	United States	11–11; PSO: 6–5	Greece	Huizhou, China
25 Jun 2016	Score by quarters: 5–2, 1–3, 4–5, 1–1			Huizhou, China

==== 7th Place ====
26 Jun 2016	Brazil	16–4	China	Huizhou, China
26 Jun 2016	Score by quarters: 2–1, 3–0, 5–1, 6–2			Huizhou, China

==== 5th Place ====
26 Jun 2016	Japan	7–12	Australia	Huizhou, China
26 Jun 2016	Score by quarters: 2–4, 2–3, 1–3, 2–2			Huizhou, China

==== 3rd Place ====
26 Jun 2016	Italy	7–11	Greece	Huizhou, China
26 Jun 2016	Score by quarters: 4–1, 2–4, 1–4, 0–2			Huizhou, China

==== Final ====
26 Jun 2016	Serbia	10–6	United States	Huizhou, China
26 Jun 2016	Score by quarters: 2–0, 3–1, 3–0, 2–5			Huizhou, China

== Final ranking ==
Rank	Team
Gold medal	Serbia
Silver medal	United States
Bronze medal	Greece
4	Italy
5	Australia
6	Japan
7	Brazil
8	China

2016 FINA Men's Water Polo World League

Serbia
Tenth title

Top Scorer	Player of the Tournament	Goalkeeper of the Tournament
(United States) Tony Azevedo	(Serbia) Branislav Mitrović	(Greece) Konstantinos Flegkas
