= Water polo at the 2009 Summer Universiade – Men's tournament =

Water polo at the XXV Summer Universiade

Medalists
1st place, gold medalist(s)		Australia
2nd place, silver medalist(s)		Croatia
3rd place, bronze medalist(s)		Serbia

The men's tournament of water polo at the 2009 Summer Universiade at Belgrade, Serbia was held starting July 2 and ending on July 12.

== Teams ==
Africa	Americas	Asia	Europe	Oceania	Automatic qualifiers
	Canada; Mexico; United States	China; Japan	Croatia; France; Greece; Hungary; Italy; Montenegro; Poland; Russia; Spain	Australia	Serbia– Universiade hosts

== Preliminary round ==
Qualified for the quarterfinals
Qualified for the eightfinals
Will play for places 13-16

=== Group A ===
Team	Pld	W	D	L	GF	GA	GD	Pts
Serbia	3	3	0	0	38	13	+25	6
Croatia	3	2	0	1	44	25	+19	4
France	3	1	0	2	22	37	-15	2
Mexico	3	0	0	3	18	47	-29	0

July 2, 2009; 9:00	Game 1	France	13–8	Mexico	SRC Banjica; Referees: Riccitelli (ITA), Michalak (POL)
July 2, 2009; 9:00	Game 1	Score by quarters: 2-3, 3-0, 4-2, 4-3			SRC Banjica; Referees: Riccitelli (ITA), Michalak (POL)
July 2, 2009; 9:00	Game 1	Harrissart 4	Goals	Vazqvez, Schmidt, Castañeda, O'Brien 2	SRC Banjica; Referees: Riccitelli (ITA), Michalak (POL)

July 2, 2009; 18:20	Game 8	Serbia	11–8	Croatia	SRC Banjica; Referees: Petik (HUN), Krapivin (RUS)
July 2, 2009; 18:20	Game 8	Score by quarters: 3-0, 1-0, 5-7, 2-1			SRC Banjica; Referees: Petik (HUN), Krapivin (RUS)
July 2, 2009; 18:20	Game 8	Popovič, Basic, Filipović 2	Goals	Ban, Krizman, Samodol 2	SRC Banjica; Referees: Petik (HUN), Krapivin (RUS)

July 3, 2009; 9:00	Game 9	Mexico	8–19	Croatia	SRC Banjica; Referees: Orikasa (JPN), Cao (CHN)
July 3, 2009; 9:00	Game 9	Score by quarters: 1-6, 1-4, 3-3, 3-6			SRC Banjica; Referees: Orikasa (JPN), Cao (CHN)
July 3, 2009; 9:00	Game 9	Mejia Berumen, Perez 2	Goals	Bebić 4	SRC Banjica; Referees: Orikasa (JPN), Cao (CHN)

July 3, 2009; 18:20	Game 16	Serbia	12–3	France	SRC Banjica; Referees: Cabello Lopez (ESP), Redding (USA)
July 3, 2009; 18:20	Game 16	Score by quarters: 2-1, 3-0, 4-0, 3-2			SRC Banjica; Referees: Cabello Lopez (ESP), Redding (USA)
July 3, 2009; 18:20	Game 16	Cuk, Filipović 3	Goals	Harrissart 2	SRC Banjica; Referees: Cabello Lopez (ESP), Redding (USA)

July 4, 2009; 9:00	Game 17	France	6–17	Croatia	SRC Banjica; Referees: Fekete (HUN), Makihashi (JPN)
July 4, 2009; 9:00	Game 17	Score by quarters: 2-6, 1-6, 2-4, 1-3			SRC Banjica; Referees: Fekete (HUN), Makihashi (JPN)
July 4, 2009; 9:00	Game 17	vander Meulen, Harrissart 2	Goals	Car, Bebić 3	SRC Banjica; Referees: Fekete (HUN), Makihashi (JPN)

July 4, 2009; 18:20	Game 24	Serbia	15–2	Mexico	SRC Banjica; Referees: Mackay (CAN), He (CHN)
July 4, 2009; 18:20	Game 24	Score by quarters: 4-1, 3-0, 3-0, 5-1			SRC Banjica; Referees: Mackay (CAN), He (CHN)
July 4, 2009; 18:20	Game 24	Basic, Vapenski, Cuk, Petković 2	Goals	Schmidt 2	SRC Banjica; Referees: Mackay (CAN), He (CHN)

=== Group B ===
Team	Pld	W	D	L	GF	GA	GD	Pts
Australia	3	3	0	0	43	11	+32	6
Greece	3	2	0	1	23	15	+8	4
Montenegro	3	1	0	2	23	29	-6	2
Canada	3	0	0	3	12	46	-34	0

July 2, 2009; 10:20	Game 2	Montenegro	3–6	Greece	SRC Banjica; Referees: Cao (CHN), Fekete (HUN)
July 2, 2009; 10:20	Game 2	Score by quarters: 0-4, 2-0, 1-1, 0-1			SRC Banjica; Referees: Cao (CHN), Fekete (HUN)
July 2, 2009; 10:20	Game 2	Dončić 2	Goals	Beristianos 2	SRC Banjica; Referees: Cao (CHN), Fekete (HUN)

July 2, 2009; 11:40	Game 3	Australia	20–0	Canada	SRC Banjica; Referees: Cabello Lopez (ESP), Makihashi (JPN)
July 2, 2009; 11:40	Game 3	Score by quarters: 4-0, 3-0, 9-0, 4-0			SRC Banjica; Referees: Cabello Lopez (ESP), Makihashi (JPN)
July 2, 2009; 11:40	Game 3	Maitland, Cotterill 3	Goals		SRC Banjica; Referees: Cabello Lopez (ESP), Makihashi (JPN)

July 3, 2009; 10:20	Game 10	Canada	5–12	Greece	SRC Banjica; Referees: Krapivin (RUS), Taccini (ITA)
July 3, 2009; 10:20	Game 10	Score by quarters: 1-2, 1-1, 2-3, 1-6			SRC Banjica; Referees: Krapivin (RUS), Taccini (ITA)
July 3, 2009; 10:20	Game 10	Kaukinen 2	Goals	Kocheilas 4	SRC Banjica; Referees: Krapivin (RUS), Taccini (ITA)

July 3, 2009; 11:40	Game 11	Montenegro	6–16	Australia	SRC Banjica; Referees: Voevodin (RUS), He (CHN)
July 3, 2009; 11:40	Game 11	Score by quarters: 1-4, 2-2, 1-6, 2-4			SRC Banjica; Referees: Voevodin (RUS), He (CHN)
July 3, 2009; 11:40	Game 11	Brguljan, Klikovac, Dončić 2	Goals	Campbell, Gilchrist 4	SRC Banjica; Referees: Voevodin (RUS), He (CHN)

July 4, 2009; 10:20	Game 18	Montenegro	14–7	Canada	SRC Banjica; Referees: Michalak (POL), Redding (USA)
July 4, 2009; 10:20	Game 18	Score by quarters: 4-1, 3-1, 4-3, 3-2			SRC Banjica; Referees: Michalak (POL), Redding (USA)
July 4, 2009; 10:20	Game 18	Brguljan 4	Goals	Venner 4	SRC Banjica; Referees: Michalak (POL), Redding (USA)

July 4, 2009; 11:40	Game 19	Australia	7–5	Greece	SRC Banjica; Referees: Krapivin (RUS), Cabello Lopez (ESP)
July 4, 2009; 11:40	Game 19	Score by quarters: 1-0, 2-1, 3-1, 1-3			SRC Banjica; Referees: Krapivin (RUS), Cabello Lopez (ESP)
July 4, 2009; 11:40	Game 19	Cody, Maitland 2	Goals	Kocheilas, Katsoulakis 2	SRC Banjica; Referees: Krapivin (RUS), Cabello Lopez (ESP)

=== Group C ===
Team	Pld	W	D	L	GF	GA	GD	Pts
Russia	3	2	0	1	39	15	+24	4
Italy	3	2	0	1	41	15	+26	4
Spain	3	2	0	1	34	17	+17	4
China	3	0	0	3	6	73	-67	0

July 2, 2009; 13:00	Game 4	Italy	5–8	Russia	SRC Banjica; Referees: Abramović (MNE), Mackay (CAN)
July 2, 2009; 13:00	Game 4	Score by quarters: 1-0, 1-3, 2-2, 1-3			SRC Banjica; Referees: Abramović (MNE), Mackay (CAN)
July 2, 2009; 13:00	Game 4	Bertoli, Ferrone, Nora, la Penna, Gobbi 1	Goals	Stepanyuk, Vishnyakov, Lisunov 2	SRC Banjica; Referees: Abramović (MNE), Mackay (CAN)

July 2, 2009; 14:20	Game 5	Spain	22–1	China	SRC Banjica; Referees: Mejia (MEX), Kouretas (GRE)
July 2, 2009; 14:20	Game 5	Score by quarters: 5-0, 5-0, 5-1, 7-0			SRC Banjica; Referees: Mejia (MEX), Kouretas (GRE)
July 2, 2009; 14:20	Game 5	Sanchez Campos 5	Goals	Li 1	SRC Banjica; Referees: Mejia (MEX), Kouretas (GRE)

July 3, 2009; 13:00	Game 12	China	2–24	Russia	SRC Banjica; Referees: Bonnay (FRA), Deslières (CAN)
July 3, 2009; 13:00	Game 12	Score by quarters: 0-5, 0-7, 0-6, 2-6			SRC Banjica; Referees: Bonnay (FRA), Deslières (CAN)
July 3, 2009; 13:00	Game 12	Zhang, Lu 1	Goals	Stepanyuk, Vishnyakov 5	SRC Banjica; Referees: Bonnay (FRA), Deslières (CAN)

July 3, 2009; 14:20	Game 13	Italy	9–4	Spain	SRC Banjica; Referees: Stefanović (SRB), Brala (CRO)
July 3, 2009; 14:20	Game 13	Score by quarters: 3-3, 2-1, 4-0, 0-0			SRC Banjica; Referees: Stefanović (SRB), Brala (CRO)
July 3, 2009; 14:20	Game 13	Saccoia 3	Goals	Hernandez Murillo 2	SRC Banjica; Referees: Stefanović (SRB), Brala (CRO)

July 4, 2009; 13:00	Game 20	Italy	27–3	China	SRC Banjica; Referees: Bonnay (FRA), Johnson (AUS)
July 4, 2009; 13:00	Game 20	Score by quarters: 5-1, 7-2, 7-0, 8-0			SRC Banjica; Referees: Bonnay (FRA), Johnson (AUS)
July 4, 2009; 13:00	Game 20	Ferrone 5	Goals	Li 2	SRC Banjica; Referees: Bonnay (FRA), Johnson (AUS)

July 4, 2009; 14:20	Game 21	Spain	8–7	Russia	SRC Banjica; Referees: Kouretas (GRE), Hart (AUS)
July 4, 2009; 14:20	Game 21	Score by quarters: 1-2, 4-0, 1-4, 2-1			SRC Banjica; Referees: Kouretas (GRE), Hart (AUS)
July 4, 2009; 14:20	Game 21	Fernández Miranda 3	Goals	Vishnyakov 3	SRC Banjica; Referees: Kouretas (GRE), Hart (AUS)

=== Group D ===
Team	Pld	W	D	L	GF	GA	GD	Pts
Hungary	3	3	0	0	33	17	+16	6
United States	3	1	1	1	32	20	+12	3
Japan	3	1	1	1	32	25	+7	3
Poland	3	0	0	3	11	46	-35	0

July 2, 2009; 15:40	Game 6	Hungary	12–3	Poland	SRC Banjica; Referees: Brala (CRO), Bonnay (FRA)
July 2, 2009; 15:40	Game 6	Score by quarters: 3-1, 2-1, 3-1, 4-0			SRC Banjica; Referees: Brala (CRO), Bonnay (FRA)
July 2, 2009; 15:40	Game 6	Létay 4	Goals	Różycki, Klajić, Leszek 1	SRC Banjica; Referees: Brala (CRO), Bonnay (FRA)

July 2, 2009; 17:00	Game 7	Japan	8–8	United States	SRC Banjica; Referees: Stefanović (SRB), Hart (AUS)
July 2, 2009; 17:00	Game 7	Score by quarters: 3-2, 1-3, 2-3, 2-0			SRC Banjica; Referees: Stefanović (SRB), Hart (AUS)
July 2, 2009; 17:00	Game 7	Someya, Shimizu, Yanase 2	Goals	Hale 3	SRC Banjica; Referees: Stefanović (SRB), Hart (AUS)

July 3, 2009; 15:40	Game 14	United States	16–3	Poland	SRC Banjica; Referees: Kouretas (GRE), Rakovič (SRB)
July 3, 2009; 15:40	Game 14	Score by quarters: 4-1, 5-0, 4-2, 3-0			SRC Banjica; Referees: Kouretas (GRE), Rakovič (SRB)
July 3, 2009; 15:40	Game 14	Mello, Sagehorn 3	Goals	Różycki 2	SRC Banjica; Referees: Kouretas (GRE), Rakovič (SRB)

July 3, 2009; 17:00	Game 15	Hungary	12–6	Japan	SRC Banjica; Referees: Abramović (MNE), Johnson (AUS)
July 3, 2009; 17:00	Game 15	Score by quarters: 3-1, 2-2, 3-2, 4-1			SRC Banjica; Referees: Abramović (MNE), Johnson (AUS)
July 3, 2009; 17:00	Game 15	Toth 4	Goals	Shimizu 2	SRC Banjica; Referees: Abramović (MNE), Johnson (AUS)

July 4, 2009; 15:40	Game 22	Hungary	9–8	United States	SRC Banjica; Referees: Abramović (MNE), Mejia (MEX)
July 4, 2009; 15:40	Game 22	Score by quarters: 1-1, 3-2, 3-1, 2-4			SRC Banjica; Referees: Abramović (MNE), Mejia (MEX)
July 4, 2009; 15:40	Game 22	Kallay, Hegedus, Bundschuh 2	Goals	Monsees, Buckner 2	SRC Banjica; Referees: Abramović (MNE), Mejia (MEX)

July 4, 2009; 17:00	Game 23	Japan	18–5	Poland	SRC Banjica; Referees: Rakovič (SRB), Deslières (CAN)
July 4, 2009; 17:00	Game 23	Score by quarters: 3-1, 5-0, 4-1, 6-3			SRC Banjica; Referees: Rakovič (SRB), Deslières (CAN)
July 4, 2009; 17:00	Game 23	Takei 5	Goals	Bednarek, Leszek 2	SRC Banjica; Referees: Rakovič (SRB), Deslières (CAN)

== Classification 13-16 places ==
July 6, 2009; 9:00	Game 25	Mexico	8–10	Canada	SRC Banjica; Referees: Hart (AUS), Makihashi (JPN)
July 6, 2009; 9:00	Game 25	Score by quarters: 4-1, 2-3, 1-2, 1-4			SRC Banjica; Referees: Hart (AUS), Makihashi (JPN)
July 6, 2009; 9:00	Game 25	Schmidt, Perez 2	Goals	Kaukinen 4	SRC Banjica; Referees: Hart (AUS), Makihashi (JPN)

July 6, 2009; 10:20	Game 26	China	6–10	Poland	SRC Banjica; Referees: Kouretas (GRE), Redding (USA)
July 6, 2009; 10:20	Game 26	Score by quarters: 2-3, 1-1, 1-4, 2-2			SRC Banjica; Referees: Kouretas (GRE), Redding (USA)
July 6, 2009; 10:20	Game 26	Chen 2	Goals	Leszek 4	SRC Banjica; Referees: Kouretas (GRE), Redding (USA)

== Eightfinals ==
July 6, 2009; 11:40	Game 27	Croatia	10–7	Montenegro	SRC Banjica; Referees: Riccitelli (ITA), Cabello Lopez (ESP)
July 6, 2009; 11:40	Game 27	Score by quarters: 2-1, 3-2, 3-3, 2-1			SRC Banjica; Referees: Riccitelli (ITA), Cabello Lopez (ESP)
July 6, 2009; 11:40	Game 27	Cule, Kovačić, Ban 2	Goals	Klikovac 3	SRC Banjica; Referees: Riccitelli (ITA), Cabello Lopez (ESP)

July 6, 2009; 15:00	Game 28	France	5–7	Greece	SRC Banjica; Referees: Stefanović (SRB), Mackay (CAN)
July 6, 2009; 15:00	Game 28	Score by quarters: 0-1, 2-3, 2-1, 1-2			SRC Banjica; Referees: Stefanović (SRB), Mackay (CAN)
July 6, 2009; 15:00	Game 28	Harrissart, Clay 2	Goals	Papadopoulos, Beristianos 2	SRC Banjica; Referees: Stefanović (SRB), Mackay (CAN)

July 6, 2009; 16:20	Game 29	Italy	13–11 (OT)	Japan	SRC Banjica; Referees: Cao (CHN), Petik (HUN)
July 6, 2009; 16:20	Game 29	Score by quarters: 3-3, 1-2, 2-2, 2-1 OT: 5-3			SRC Banjica; Referees: Cao (CHN), Petik (HUN)
July 6, 2009; 16:20	Game 29	Bertoli 3	Goals	Irei 4	SRC Banjica; Referees: Cao (CHN), Petik (HUN)

July 6, 2009; 17:40	Game 30	Spain	8–10'	United States	SRC Banjica; Referees: Voevodin (RUS), Bonnay (FRA)
July 6, 2009; 17:40	Game 30	Score by quarters: 1-3, 1-2, 2-3, 4-2			SRC Banjica; Referees: Voevodin (RUS), Bonnay (FRA)
July 6, 2009; 17:40	Game 30	Hernandez Murillo, Fernández Miranda 3	Goals	Hale, MacDonell 2	SRC Banjica; Referees: Voevodin (RUS), Bonnay (FRA)

=== Classification 9-12 places ===
July 8, 2009; 11:40	Game 33	Montenegro	13–14	Japan	SRC Banjica; Referees: Krapivin (RUS), Redding (USA)
July 8, 2009; 11:40	Game 33	Score by quarters: 4-4, 2-5, 3-3, 4-2			SRC Banjica; Referees: Krapivin (RUS), Redding (USA)
July 8, 2009; 11:40	Game 33	Brguljan, Klikovac 3	Goals	Someya 4	SRC Banjica; Referees: Krapivin (RUS), Redding (USA)

July 8, 2009; 13:00	Game 34	France	5–8	Spain	SRC Banjica; Referees: Cao (CHN), Mejia (MEX)
July 8, 2009; 13:00	Game 34	Score by quarters: 1-2, 2-1, 1-4, 1-1			SRC Banjica; Referees: Cao (CHN), Mejia (MEX)
July 8, 2009; 13:00	Game 34	Robin, Tomi, Camarasa, Clay, Bruyere 1	Goals	Sanz Fernandez, Hernandez Murillo 2	SRC Banjica; Referees: Cao (CHN), Mejia (MEX)

== Quarterfinals ==
July 8, 2009; 14:20	Game 38	Hungary	7–8	Greece	SRC Banjica; Referees: Voevodin (RUS), Hart (AUS)
July 8, 2009; 14:20	Game 38	Score by quarters: 4-2, 1-1, 0-2, 2-3			SRC Banjica; Referees: Voevodin (RUS), Hart (AUS)
July 8, 2009; 14:20	Game 38	Bundschuh 2	Goals	Katsoulakis 3	SRC Banjica; Referees: Voevodin (RUS), Hart (AUS)

July 8, 2009; 15:40	Game 36	Australia	8–4	United States	SRC Banjica; Referees: Stefanović (SRB), Brala (CRO)
July 8, 2009; 15:40	Game 36	Score by quarters: 2-1, 1-2, 4-1, 1-0			SRC Banjica; Referees: Stefanović (SRB), Brala (CRO)
July 8, 2009; 15:40	Game 36	Campbell, Martin 2	Goals	Mello 2	SRC Banjica; Referees: Stefanović (SRB), Brala (CRO)

July 8, 2009; 17:00	Game 37	Russia	8–16	Croatia	SRC Banjica; Referees: Abramović (MNE), Bonnay (FRA)
July 8, 2009; 17:00	Game 37	Score by quarters: 1-5, 3-3, 3-5, 1-3			SRC Banjica; Referees: Abramović (MNE), Bonnay (FRA)
July 8, 2009; 17:00	Game 37	Yurchik 2	Goals	Babic, Ban 3	SRC Banjica; Referees: Abramović (MNE), Bonnay (FRA)

July 8, 2009; 18:20	Game 35	Serbia	7–6	Italy	SRC Banjica; Referees: Fekete (HUN), Cabello Lopez (ESP)
July 8, 2009; 18:20	Game 35	Score by quarters: 2-2, 2-1, 2-1, 1-2			SRC Banjica; Referees: Fekete (HUN), Cabello Lopez (ESP)
July 8, 2009; 18:20	Game 35	Cuk 2	Goals	Saccoia 2	SRC Banjica; Referees: Fekete (HUN), Cabello Lopez (ESP)

=== Classification 5-8 places ===
July 10, 2009; 11:40	Game 41	Italy	8–11	United States	SRC Banjica; Referees: Stefanović (SRB), Mejia (MEX)
July 10, 2009; 11:40	Game 41	Score by quarters: 3-5, 2-1, 3-3, 0-2			SRC Banjica; Referees: Stefanović (SRB), Mejia (MEX)
July 10, 2009; 11:40	Game 41	di Somma, la Penna 2	Goals	Mann 6	SRC Banjica; Referees: Stefanović (SRB), Mejia (MEX)

July 10, 2009; 15:00	Game 42	Russia	11–13	Hungary	SRC Banjica; Referees: Brala (CRO), Mackay (CAN)
July 10, 2009; 15:00	Game 42	Score by quarters: 4-4, 2-4, 3-3, 2-2			SRC Banjica; Referees: Brala (CRO), Mackay (CAN)
July 10, 2009; 15:00	Game 42	Vishnyakov 3	Goals	Toth 5	SRC Banjica; Referees: Brala (CRO), Mackay (CAN)

== Semifinals ==
July 10, 2009; 16:20	Game 44	Croatia	11–8	Greece	SRC Banjica; Referees: Abramović (MNE), Fekete (HUN)
July 10, 2009; 16:20	Game 44	Score by quarters: 4-1, 4-3, 2-1, 1-3			SRC Banjica; Referees: Abramović (MNE), Fekete (HUN)
July 10, 2009; 16:20	Game 44	Babic 4	Goals	Karountzos 3	SRC Banjica; Referees: Abramović (MNE), Fekete (HUN)

July 10, 2009; 17:40	Game 43	Serbia	6–7	Australia	SRC Banjica; Referees: Voevodin (RUS), Bonnay (FRA)
July 10, 2009; 17:40	Game 43	Score by quarters: 1-3, 2-2, 1-1, 2-1			SRC Banjica; Referees: Voevodin (RUS), Bonnay (FRA)
July 10, 2009; 17:40	Game 43	Popovic, Basic, Cuk, Randjic, Filipovic, Petkovic 1	Goals	Maitland 3	SRC Banjica; Referees: Voevodin (RUS), Bonnay (FRA)

== Finals ==
=== Final 15-16 places ===
July 8, 2009; 9:00	Game 31	Mexico	21–10	China	SRC Banjica; Referees: Makihashi (JPN), Johnson (AUS)
July 8, 2009; 9:00	Game 31	Score by quarters: 8-2, 4-4, 3-1, 6-3			SRC Banjica; Referees: Makihashi (JPN), Johnson (AUS)
July 8, 2009; 9:00	Game 31	Schmidt 7	Goals	Hu 4	SRC Banjica; Referees: Makihashi (JPN), Johnson (AUS)

=== Final 13-14 places ===
July 8, 2009; 10:20	Game 32	Canada	6–3	Poland	SRC Banjica; Referees: Riccitelli (ITA), Orikasa (JPN)
July 8, 2009; 10:20	Game 32	Score by quarters: 2-2, 2-1, 1-0, 1-0			SRC Banjica; Referees: Riccitelli (ITA), Orikasa (JPN)
July 8, 2009; 10:20	Game 32	Kaukinen, Palamarevic 2	Goals	Luczak, Bar, Leszek 1	SRC Banjica; Referees: Riccitelli (ITA), Orikasa (JPN)

=== Final 11-12 places ===
July 10, 2009; 9:00	Game 39	Montenegro	10–12	France	SRC Banjica; Referees: Cao (CHN), Riccitelli (ITA)
July 10, 2009; 9:00	Game 39	Score by quarters: 4-2, 1-4, 5-3, 0-3			SRC Banjica; Referees: Cao (CHN), Riccitelli (ITA)
July 10, 2009; 9:00	Game 39	Brguljan 4	Goals	Harrissart 4	SRC Banjica; Referees: Cao (CHN), Riccitelli (ITA)

=== Final 9-10 places ===
July 10, 2009; 10:20	Game 40	Japan	12–13 (OT)	Spain	SRC Banjica; Referees: Krapivin (RUS), Deslières (CAN)
July 10, 2009; 10:20	Game 40	Score by quarters: 3-3, 1-5, 3-2, 4-1 OT: 1-2			SRC Banjica; Referees: Krapivin (RUS), Deslières (CAN)
July 10, 2009; 10:20	Game 40	Okawa, Someya, Shimizu 3	Goals	Minguez Simarro 4	SRC Banjica; Referees: Krapivin (RUS), Deslières (CAN)

=== Final 7-8 places ===
July 11, 2009; 9:00	Game 45	Italy	5–8	Russia	SRC Banjica; Referees: Redding (USA), Orikasa (JPN)
July 11, 2009; 9:00	Game 45	Score by quarters: 2-1, 0-3, 3-1, 0-3			SRC Banjica; Referees: Redding (USA), Orikasa (JPN)
July 11, 2009; 9:00	Game 45	di Somma 2	Goals	Stepanyuk 4	SRC Banjica; Referees: Redding (USA), Orikasa (JPN)

=== Final 5-6 places ===
July 11, 2009; 10:20	Game 46	United States	8–9	Hungary	SRC Banjica; Referees: Kouretas (GRE), Riccitelli (ITA)
July 11, 2009; 10:20	Game 46	Score by quarters: 2-2, 0-5, 2-1, 4-1			SRC Banjica; Referees: Kouretas (GRE), Riccitelli (ITA)
July 11, 2009; 10:20	Game 46	Buckner, Mac donell, Mello 2	Goals	Toth 3	SRC Banjica; Referees: Kouretas (GRE), Riccitelli (ITA)

== Bronze medal match ==
July 11, 2009; 11:40	Game 47	Serbia	9–4	Greece	SRC Banjica; Referees: Mackay (CAN), Bonnay (FRA)
July 11, 2009; 11:40	Game 47	Score by quarters: 3-0, 2-1, 2-3, 2-0			SRC Banjica; Referees: Mackay (CAN), Bonnay (FRA)
July 11, 2009; 11:40	Game 47	Basic, Filipovic 2	Goals	Kolomvos, Mimidis, Karountzos, Koulierakis 1	SRC Banjica; Referees: Mackay (CAN), Bonnay (FRA)

== Final ==
July 11, 2009; 13:00	Game 48	Australia	6–4	Croatia	SRC Banjica; Referees: Stefanović (SRB), Voevodin (RUS)
July 11, 2009; 13:00	Game 48	Score by quarters: 0-2, 2-0, 3-2, 1-0			SRC Banjica; Referees: Stefanović (SRB), Voevodin (RUS)
July 11, 2009; 13:00	Game 48	Younger 2	Goals	Ban 2	SRC Banjica; Referees: Stefanović (SRB), Voevodin (RUS)

== Final standings ==
Place	Team
1st place, gold medalist(s)	Australia
2nd place, silver medalist(s)	Croatia
3rd place, bronze medalist(s)	Serbia
4	Greece
5	Hungary
6	United States
7	Russia
8	Italy
9	Spain
10	Japan
11	France
12	Montenegro
13	Canada
14	Poland
15	Mexico
16	China
