= Water polo at the 2018 Mediterranean Games – Men's tournament =

Men's water polo at the 2018 Mediterranean Games
Tournament details
- Host country: Spain
- Venue: 1 (in 1 host city)
- Dates: 27 June – 1 July
- Teams: 8 (from 1 confederation)

Final positions
- Champions: Serbia
- Runners-up: Greece
- Third place: Montenegro
- Fourth place: Spain

Tournament statistics
- Matches played: 16
- Goals scored: 275 (17.19 per match)

The men's water polo tournament at the 2018 Mediterranean Games was held from 27 June to 1 July at the Campclar Aquatic Center in Tarragona.

== Participating teams ==
- Greece
- France
- Italy
- Montenegro
- Portugal
- Serbia
- Spain (host)
- Turkey

== Preliminary round ==
All times are local (UTC+2).

=== Group A ===
Pos	Team	Pld	W	W+	L+	L	GF	GA	GD	Pts	Qualification
1	Serbia	3	3	0	0	0	41	10	+31	9	Final
2	Montenegro	3	2	0	0	1	41	12	+29	6	3rd place game
3	France	3	1	0	0	2	23	33	−10	3	5th place game
4	Portugal	3	0	0	0	3	9	59	−50	0	7th place game

Source: Tarragona 2018

27 June 2018; 14:20	Report	France	13–8	Portugal	Campclar Aquatic Center, Tarragona
27 June 2018; 14:20	Report	Score by quarters: 3–1, 4–3, 3–1, 3–3			Campclar Aquatic Center, Tarragona
27 June 2018; 14:20	Report	Saudadier 3	Goals	Ramos, Teixeira 2	Campclar Aquatic Center, Tarragona

27 June 2018; 18:40	Report	Serbia	6–5	Montenegro	Campclar Aquatic Center, Tarragona
27 June 2018; 18:40	Report	Score by quarters: 1–1, 0–1, 3–1, 2–2			Campclar Aquatic Center, Tarragona
27 June 2018; 18:40	Report	Mandić, S. Rašović 2	Goals	Radović 2	Campclar Aquatic Center, Tarragona

28 June 2018; 14:20	Report	Serbia	14–4	France	Campclar Aquatic Center, Tarragona
28 June 2018; 14:20	Report	Score by quarters: 4–0, 2–3, 4–0, 4–1			Campclar Aquatic Center, Tarragona
28 June 2018; 14:20	Report	Aleksić, D. Pijetlović 3	Goals	four players 1	Campclar Aquatic Center, Tarragona

28 June 2018; 16:30	Report	Montenegro	25–0	Portugal	Campclar Aquatic Center, Tarragona
28 June 2018; 16:30	Report	Score by quarters: 6–0, 9–0, 5–0, 5–0			Campclar Aquatic Center, Tarragona
28 June 2018; 16:30	Report	Murišić 5	Goals		Campclar Aquatic Center, Tarragona

29 June 2018; 14:20	Report	Serbia	21–1	Portugal	Campclar Aquatic Center, Tarragona
29 June 2018; 14:20	Report	Score by quarters: 4–0, 7–0, 3–1, 7–0			Campclar Aquatic Center, Tarragona
29 June 2018; 14:20	Report	Ubović 4	Goals	Secrieru 1	Campclar Aquatic Center, Tarragona

29 June 2018; 16:30	Report	Montenegro	11–6	France	Campclar Aquatic Center, Tarragona
29 June 2018; 16:30	Report	Score by quarters: 2–1, 1–1, 4–2, 4–2			Campclar Aquatic Center, Tarragona
29 June 2018; 16:30	Report	Murišić 3	Goals	Crousillat 2	Campclar Aquatic Center, Tarragona

=== Group B ===
Pos	Team	Pld	W	W+	L+	L	GF	GA	GD	Pts	Qualification
1	Greece	3	2	0	1	0	35	16	+19	7	Final
2	Spain (H)	3	2	0	0	1	30	15	+15	6	3rd place game
3	Italy	3	1	1	0	1	40	20	+20	5	5th place game
4	Turkey	3	0	0	0	3	10	64	−54	0	7th place game

Source: Tarragona 2018
(H) Host

27 June 2018; 16:30	Report	Greece	10–11 (PSO)	Italy	Campclar Aquatic Center, Tarragona
27 June 2018; 16:30	Report	Score by quarters: 0–2, 3–2, 2–0, 2–3 PSO: 3–4			Campclar Aquatic Center, Tarragona
27 June 2018; 16:30	Report	Gounas 3	Goals	Di Fulvio, Figlioli 3	Campclar Aquatic Center, Tarragona

27 June 2018; 20:50	Report	Spain	20–5	Turkey	Campclar Aquatic Center, Tarragona
27 June 2018; 20:50	Report	Score by quarters: 3–0, 5–2, 7–3, 5–0			Campclar Aquatic Center, Tarragona
27 June 2018; 20:50	Report	Tahull 4	Goals	Bıyık 2	Campclar Aquatic Center, Tarragona

28 June 2018; 18:40	Report	Italy	23–3	Turkey	Campclar Aquatic Center, Tarragona
28 June 2018; 18:40	Report	Score by quarters: 7–0, 5–1, 4–1, 7–1			Campclar Aquatic Center, Tarragona
28 June 2018; 18:40	Report	Gallo, Echenique 4	Goals	three players 1	Campclar Aquatic Center, Tarragona

28 June 2018; 20:50	Report	Greece	4–3	Spain	Campclar Aquatic Center, Tarragona
28 June 2018; 20:50	Report	Score by quarters: 0–1, 3–1, 1–0, 0–1			Campclar Aquatic Center, Tarragona
28 June 2018; 20:50	Report	Dervisis, Gounas 2	Goals	Español 2	Campclar Aquatic Center, Tarragona

29 June 2018; 18:40	Report	Greece	21–2	Turkey	Campclar Aquatic Center, Tarragona
29 June 2018; 18:40	Report	Score by quarters: 8–0, 3–1, 7–1, 3–0			Campclar Aquatic Center, Tarragona
29 June 2018; 18:40	Report	Gounas 5	Goals	Kahraman, Sönmez 1	Campclar Aquatic Center, Tarragona

29 June 2018; 20:50	Report	Italy	6–7	Spain	Campclar Aquatic Center, Tarragona
29 June 2018; 20:50	Report	Score by quarters: 1–3, 2–2, 1–2, 2–0			Campclar Aquatic Center, Tarragona
29 June 2018; 20:50	Report	Di Fulvio 3	Goals	Munarriz, Tahull 2	Campclar Aquatic Center, Tarragona

== Finals ==
=== Seventh place game ===
30 June 2018; 12:20	Report	Turkey	4–6	Portugal	Campclar Aquatic Center, Tarragona
30 June 2018; 12:20	Report	Score by quarters: 0–1, 2–1, 0–0, 2–4			Campclar Aquatic Center, Tarragona
30 June 2018; 12:20	Report	Bıyık 2	Goals	Moreira 3	Campclar Aquatic Center, Tarragona

=== Fifth place game ===
30 June 2018; 14:30	Report	Italy	15–2	France	Campclar Aquatic Center, Tarragona
30 June 2018; 14:30	Report	Score by quarters: 4–1, 3–0, 5–0, 3–1			Campclar Aquatic Center, Tarragona
30 June 2018; 14:30	Report	Fondelli, Gallo 3	Goals	Piot, Vanpeperstraete 1	Campclar Aquatic Center, Tarragona

=== Third place game ===
1 July 2018; 09:30	Report	Spain	4–6	Montenegro	Campclar Aquatic Center, Tarragona
1 July 2018; 09:30	Report	Score by quarters: 2–2, 1–3, 0–0, 1–1			Campclar Aquatic Center, Tarragona
1 July 2018; 09:30	Report	four players 1	Goals	six players 1	Campclar Aquatic Center, Tarragona

=== Final ===
1 July 2018; 12:10	Report	Greece	10–12 (PSO)	Serbia	Campclar Aquatic Center, Tarragona
1 July 2018; 12:10	Report	Score by quarters: 1–1, 2–0, 3–4, 2–3 PSO: 2–4			Campclar Aquatic Center, Tarragona
1 July 2018; 12:10	Report	Fountoulis 3	Goals	Filipović, Mandić 3	Campclar Aquatic Center, Tarragona

== Final standings ==
Rank	Team
1st place, gold medalist(s)	Serbia
2nd place, silver medalist(s)	Greece
3rd place, bronze medalist(s)	Montenegro
4	Spain
5	Italy
6	France
7	Portugal
8	Turkey
