= 2014 FINA Men's Water Polo World League =

- League: FINA Water Polo World League
- Sport: Water Polo

FINA Men's Water Polo World League seasons
- ← 2013 2015 →

The 2014 FINA Men's Water Polo World League is played between November 2013 and June 2014 and open to all men's water polo national teams. After participating in a preliminary round, eight teams qualify to play in a final tournament, called the Super Final in Dubai, UAE from 16 to 21 June 2014.

In the world league, there are specific rules that do not allow matches to end in a draw. If teams are level at the end of the 4th quarter of any world league match, the match will be decided by a penalty shootout. Teams earn points in the standings in group matches as follows:

- Match won in normal time - 3 points
- Match won in shootout - 2 points
- Match lost in shootout - 1 point
- Match lost in normal time - 0 points

== Preliminary round ==
=== Europe ===
The European preliminary round consisted of two group of three teams and a third group of four teams. The winner of each group after the home and away series of games qualified for the Super Final.

==== Group A ====
Team	GP	W	L	GF	GA	GD	Pts
Serbia	4	4	0	51	25	+26	12
Russia	4	1	3	37	44	-7	3
Romania	4	1	3	28	47	-23	3

==== Group B ====
Team	GP	W	L	GF	GA	GD	Pts
Hungary	4	3	1	37	33	+4	9
Greece	4	2	2	36	38	-2	5
Croatia	4	1	3	35	37	-2	4

==== Group C ====
Team	GP	W	L	GF	GA	GD	Pts
Montenegro	6	5	1	64	52	+12	15
Italy	6	5	2	68	55	+13	15
Slovakia	6	1	5	55	66	-11	3
Germany	6	1	5	54	68	-14	3

=== Intercontinental ===
The intercontinental tournament will feature teams from Africa, the Americas, Asia and Oceania. The teams are split into two groups of four teams with all teams progressing to the knock-out stage. As the hosts of the Super Final (UAE) did not enter a team in the tournament the top five teams from this tournament qualified for the Super Final, instead of the initially allocated four. South Africa withdrew from the tournament before games commenced and were replaced by China II, whose games were exhibition and did not count in the standings. The games were played between 27 May and 1 June 2014 in Shanghai, China.

==== Group A ====
Team	GP	W	L	GF	GA	GD	Pts
Australia	3	3	0	38	26	+12	9
Canada	3	2	1	30	27	+3	6
Kazakhstan	3	1	2	23	26	-3	3
Japan	3	0	3	26	38	-12	0

27 May 2014	Kazakhstan	10–7	Japan	Shanghai, China

27 May 2014	Australia	11–10	Canada	Shanghai, China

28 May 2014	Canada	12–10	Japan	Shanghai, China

28 May 2014	Kazakhstan	7–11	Australia	Shanghai, China

29 May 2014	Kazakhstan	6–8	Canada	Shanghai, China

29 May 2014	Australia	16–9	Japan	Shanghai, China

==== Group B ====
Team	GP	W	L	GF	GA	GD	Pts
United States	2	2	0	25	14	+11	6
Brazil	2	1	1	21	19	+2	3
China	2	0	2	12	25	-13	0

27 May 2014	China	4–14	United States	Shanghai, China

28 May 2014	China	8–11	Brazil	Shanghai, China

29 May 2014	United States	11–10	Brazil	Shanghai, China

==== Knockout stage ====
Quarterfinal
A1	Australia	16
B4	China II	6
A3	Kazakhstan	7
B2	Brazil	8
A2	Canada	17
B3	China	18
A4	Japan	8
B1	United States	10

Semifinal
Australia	6
Brazil	9
China	6
United States	13

Final
Brazil	7
United States	11
Third place
Australia	16
China	8

===== Quarterfinals =====
30 May 2014	Kazakhstan	7–8	Brazil	Shanghai, China

30 May 2014	Canada	17–18	China	Shanghai, China

30 May 2014	Japan	8–10	United States	Shanghai, China

===== Semifinals =====
31 May 2014	Canada	11–8	Japan	Shanghai, China

31 May 2014	China	6–13	United States	Shanghai, China

31 May 2014	Brazil	9–6	Australia	Shanghai, China

===== 5th-place play-off =====
1 June 2014	Canada	9–8	Kazakhstan	Shanghai, China

===== 3rd-place play-off =====
1 June 2014	China	8–16	Australia	Shanghai, China

===== Final =====
1 June 2014	United States	11–7	Brazil	Shanghai, China

== Super Final ==
In the Super Final the eight qualifying teams are split into two groups of four teams with all teams progressing to the knock-out stage. The games were played in Dubai, UAE from 16 to 21 June 2014.

=== Group A ===
Team	GP	W	L	GF	GA	GD	Pts
Serbia	3	3	0	47	18	+29	9
Montenegro	3	2	1	29	27	+2	6
Brazil	3	1	2	21	36	-15	3
China	3	0	3	26	42	-16	0

16 June 2014	Serbia	21–9	China	Dubai, UAE

16 June 2014	Brazil	5–15	Montenegro	Dubai, UAE

17 June 2014	Brazil	12–9	China	Dubai, UAE

17 June 2014	Serbia	14–5	Montenegro	Dubai, UAE

18 June 2014	Serbia	12–4	Brazil	Dubai, UAE

18 June 2014	China	8–9	Montenegro	Dubai, UAE

=== Group B ===
Team	GP	W	L	GF	GA	GD	Pts
Hungary	3	3	0	37	17	+20	9
Australia	3	1	2	21	25	-4	3
United States	3	1	2	25	33	-8	3
Canada	3	1	2	22	30	-8	3

16 June 2014	Hungary	11–5	Australia	Dubai, UAE

16 June 2014	United States	12–9	Canada	Dubai, UAE

17 June 2014	Hungary	10–3	Canada	Dubai, UAE

17 June 2014	United States	4–8	Australia	Dubai, UAE

18 June 2014	Hungary	16–9	United States	Dubai, UAE

18 June 2014	Australia	8–10	Canada	Dubai, UAE

=== Knockout stage ===
Quarterfinal
A1	Serbia	16
B4	Canada	11
A3	Brazil	7
B2	Australia	14
A2	Montenegro	10
B3	United States	4
A4	China	5
B1	Hungary	13

Semifinal
A1	Serbia	12
B2	Australia	5
A2	Montenegro	8
B1	Hungary	10

Final
A1	Serbia	10
B1	Hungary	6
Third place
B2	Australia	9
A2	Montenegro	12

==== Quarterfinals ====
19 June 2014	Game 13	Montenegro	10–4	United States	Dubai, UAE

19 June 2014	Game 14	Brazil	7–14	Australia	Dubai, UAE

19 June 2014	Game 15	Serbia	16–11	Canada	Dubai, UAE

19 June 2014	Game 16	China	5–13	Hungary	Dubai, UAE

==== Semifinals ====
20 June 2014	Game 17	United States	15–5	China	Dubai, UAE

20 June 2014	Game 18	Brazil	13 (6)–14 (7)	Canada	Dubai, UAE

20 June 2014	Game 19	Montenegro	8–10	Hungary	Dubai, UAE

20 June 2014	Game 20	Australia	5–12	Serbia	Dubai, UAE

==== 7th-place play-off ====
21 June 2014	Game 21	China	7–8	Brazil	Dubai, UAE

==== 5th-place play-off ====
21 June 2014	Game 22	United States	14–10	Canada	Dubai, UAE

==== 3rd-place play-off ====
21 June 2014	Game 23	Montenegro	12 (4)–9 (1)	Australia	Dubai, UAE

==== Final ====
21 June 2014	Game 24	Hungary	6–10	Serbia	Dubai, UAE

== Final ranking ==
RANK	TEAM
	Serbia
	Hungary
	Montenegro
4.	Australia
5.	United States
6.	Canada
7.	Brazil
8.	China

2014 FINA Men's World League

Serbia
Eighth title

=== Awards ===
Top Scorer
(Serbia) Filip Filipović
