= Sukno =

Sukno is a surname. Notable people with the surname include:

- Goran Sukno (1959–2026), Yugoslav Croatian water polo player
- Sandro Sukno (born 1990), Croatian water polo player
