= 2013 FINA Men's Water Polo World League =

- League: FINA Water Polo World League
- Sport: Water Polo

FINA Men's Water Polo World League seasons
- ← 2012 2014 →

The 2013 FINA Men's Water Polo World League was played between November 2012 and June 2013, and was open to all men's water polo national teams.

== Super Final ==
The Super Final was playing from 11–16 June 2013 in Chelyabinsk, Russia.

=== Qualified teams ===
Africa	Americas	Asia	Europe	Oceania
—	Brazil; United States	China; Japan	Hungary; Montenegro; Serbia; Russia (Host)	—

=== Group A ===
Team	GP	W	L	GF	GA	GD	Pts
Hungary	3	2	1	43	37	+6	6
Montenegro	3	1	2	41	38	+3	5
United States	3	2	1	32	35	-3	5
Japan	3	1	2	33	39	-6	2

Montenegro	10–10 (5–6)	Japan
United States	9–9 (6–5)	Hungary

United States	13–12	Japan
Montenegro	10–10 (7–8)	Hungary

Montenegro	9–4	United States
Japan	5–11	Hungary

=== Group B ===
Team	GP	W	L	GF	GA	GD	Pts
Serbia	3	3	0	43	23	+20	9
China	3	2	1	35	27	+8	6
Russia (H)	3	1	2	35	33	+2	3
Brazil	3	0	3	17	47	-30	0

Serbia	13–5	China
Brazil	7–13	Russia

Brazil	3–18	China
Serbia	14–11	Russia

Serbia	16–7	Brazil
China	12–11	Russia

=== Knockout stage ===
Quarterfinals
Montenegro	7 (5)
Russia	7 (4)
Serbia	14
Japan	8
China	8 (3)
United States	8 (5)
Hungary	8
Brazil	4

Semifinals
Montenegro	6
Serbia	8
United States	6
Hungary	8

Final
Serbia	12
Hungary	7
Third place
Montenegro	10 (3)
United States	10 (1)

5th–8th Places

Semifinals
Russia	13
Japan	7
China	12
Brazil	7

Fifth place
Russia	17
China	8
Seventh place
Japan	9
Brazil	4

== Final ranking ==
RANK	TEAM
	Serbia
	Hungary
	Montenegro
4.	United States
5.	Russia
6.	China
7.	Japan
8.	Brazil

2013 FINA Men's World League

Serbia
Seventh title

=== Awards ===
- Top Scorer
  - (Serbia) Vanja Udovičić
