= Montenegro men's national water polo team =

Men's national water polo team representing Montenegro

Montenegro
- FINA code: MNE
- Nickname(s): Crnogorske ajkule (Montenegrin Sharks)
- Association: Water Polo and Swimming Federation of Montenegro
- Confederation: LEN (Europe)
- Head coach: Dejan Savić
- Asst coach: Nebojsa Milić; Petar Radanović
- Captain: Petar Tešanović

FINA ranking (since 2008)
- Current: 8 (as of 8 April 2026)
- Highest: 1 (2021)
- Lowest: 8 (2026)

First international
- Italy 10–11 Montenegro (Trieste, Italy; December 2006)

Biggest win
- Montenegro 34–4 Great Britain (Msida, Malta; April 2026)

Biggest defeat
- Serbia 14–5 Montenegro (Dubai, UAE; 17. june 2014)

Olympic Games (team statistics)
- Appearances: 5 (first in 2008)
- Best result: 4th (2008, 2012, 2016)
- 4-time Olympian(s): Predrag Jokić (2004–2016)
- Top scorer(s): Aleksandar Ivović (38 goals, 2008–2016)
- Most saves: Miloš Šćepanović (160 saves, 2008–2016)
- Top sprinter(s): Vjekoslav Pasković (21 sprints won, 2008–2016)
- Flag bearer(s): Veljko Uskoković (2008); Predrag Jokić (2016)

World Championship
- Appearances: 10 (first in 2009)
- Best result: (silver) (2013)

World Cup
- Appearances: 3 (first in 2014)
- Best result: 5th (2025)

World League
- Appearances: 13 (first in 2007)
- Best result: (gold) (2009, 2018, 2020–21)

European Championship
- Appearances: 10 (first in 2008)
- Best result: (gold) (2008)

Mediterranean Games
- Appearances: 3 (first in 2009)
- Best result: (silver) (2022, 2026)

Media
- Website: wpolo.me (in Montenegrin)
Medal record
World Championship
Silver medal – second place	2013 Barcelona	Team
World League
Gold medal – first place	2009 Podgorica
Gold medal – first place	2018 Budapest
Gold medal – first place	2020 Tbilisi
Silver medal – second place	2010 Niš
Bronze medal – third place	2013 Chelyabinsk
Bronze medal – third place	2014 Dubai
European Championship
Gold medal – first place	2008 Málaga
Silver medal – second place	2012 Eindhoven
Silver medal – second place	2016 Belgrade
Bronze medal – third place	2020 Budapest
Mediterranean Games
Silver medal – second place	2022 Oran	Team
Silver medal – second place	2026 Taranto	Team
Bronze medal – third place	2018 Tarragona	Team

The Montenegro men's national water polo team represents Montenegro in international men's water polo competitions, and is controlled by the Water Polo and Swimming Federation of Montenegro.

== Prior history ==
Between 1918 and 1991, Montenegro was part of Yugoslavia, and its players participated in the Yugoslavia national water polo team. Between 1992 and 2006, it was part of FR Yugoslavia, later Serbia and Montenegro, so Montenegrin players played for those teams; Serbia is the sole successor to these countries so those results are recorded at Serbia national water polo team.

After the referendum and Montenegro’s independence in 2006, the Montenegrin water polo team began competing in Division B. Before that, in December 2006, they played their first official match against Italy, which the Montenegrin players won 13–10. The national team receives support from commercial partners, including Meridian, which contributes to the organization of international tournaments and preparations.

== Results ==
=== Olympic Games ===
Year	Position
(China) 2008 Beijing	4th
(United Kingdom) 2012 London	4th
(Brazil) 2016 Rio de Janeiro	4th
(Japan) 2020 Tokyo	8th
(France) 2024 Paris	9th
Total	Qualified: 5/5

=== World Championship ===
Year	Position
(Italy) 2009 Rome	9th
(China) 2011 Shanghai	7th
(Spain) 2013 Barcelona	2nd place, silver medalist(s)
(Russia) 2015 Kazan	5th
(Hungary) 2017 Budapest	5th
(South Korea) 2019 Gwangju	10th
(Hungary) 2022 Budapest	8th
(Japan) 2023 Fukuoka	8th
(Qatar) 2024 Doha	8th
2025 Singapore	6th
Total	Qualified: 10/10

=== FINA World Cup ===
Year	Position
(Romania) 2010 Oradea	did not participate
(Kazakhstan) 2014 Almaty	7th
(Germany) 2018 Berlin	did not participate
(United States) 2023 Los Angeles	group stage
(Montenegro) 2025 Podgorica	5th
(Australia) 2026 Sydney	6th
Total	Qualified: 4/6

=== FINA World League ===
Year	Position
(Germany) 2007 Berlin	Preliminary round
(Italy) 2008 Genoa	4th
(Montenegro) 2009 Podgorica	1st place, gold medalist(s)
(Serbia) 2010 Niš	2nd place, silver medalist(s)
(Italy) 2011 Florence	5th
(Kazakhstan) 2012 Almaty	did not participate
(Russia) 2013 Chelyabinsk	3rd place, bronze medalist(s)
(United Arab Emirates) 2014 Dubai	3rd place, bronze medalist(s)
(Italy) 2015 Bergamo	Preliminary round
(China) 2016 Huizhou	Preliminary round
(Russia) 2017 Ruza	did not participate
(Hungary) 2018 Budapest	1st place, gold medalist(s)
(Serbia) 2019 Belgrade	Preliminary round
(Georgia (country)) 2020 Tbilisi	1st place, gold medalist(s)
(France) 2022 Strasbourg	6th
Total	Participated: 15/20 Super Final: 9/13

=== European Championship ===
Year	Position
(Spain) 2008 Malaga	1st place, gold medalist(s)
(Croatia) 2010 Zagreb	5th
(Netherlands) 2012 Eindhoven	2nd place, silver medalist(s)
(Hungary) 2014 Budapest	4th
(Serbia) 2016 Belgrade	2nd place, silver medalist(s)
(Spain) 2018 Barcelona	6th
(Hungary) 2020 Budapest	3rd place, bronze medalist(s)
(Croatia) 2022 Split	7th
(Croatia) 2024 Dubrovnik	6th
(Serbia) 2026 Belgrade	7th
Total	Qualified: 10/10

=== Mediterranean Games ===
Year	Position
(Italy) 2009 Pescara	5th
(Turkey) 2013 Mersin	did not participate
(Spain) 2018 Tarragona	3rd place, bronze medalist(s)
(Algeria) 2022 Oran	2nd place, silver medalist(s)
(Italy) 2026 Taranto	2nd place, silver medalist(s)
Total	Participated: 4/5

== Team ==
=== Current squad ===
Roster for the 2026 Men's European Water Polo Championship.

Head coach: (Serbia) Dejan Savić

Name	Date of birth	Pos.	Club
Petar Tešanović (C)	26 November 1998 (age 27)	GK	(France) CN Marseille
Dmitrii Kholod	16 January 1992 (age 34)	W	(Montenegro) Jadran m:tel Herceg Novi
Jovan Vujović	20 January 2003 (age 23)	CF	(Montenegro) Jadran m:tel Herceg Novi
Marko Mrsić	2 January 2003 (age 23)	W	(Montenegro) VK Primorac Kotor
Aljoša Mačić	31 October 2000 (age 25)	DF	(Serbia) VK Šabac Elixir
Vlado Popadić	25 April 1996 (age 30)	W	(Italy) AN Brescia
Danilo Stupar	9 April 2007 (age 19)	W	(Montenegro) Jadran m:tel Herceg Novi
Balša Vučković	14 April 2005 (age 21)	DF	(Montenegro) VK Primorac Kotor
Miroslav Perković	15 March 2001 (age 25)	CF	(Serbia) VK Novi Beograd
Vladan Spaić	18 June 1997 (age 29)	CF	(France) CN Marseille
Dušan Matković	1 February 1999 (age 27)	W	(Croatia) VK Jadran Split
Vasilije Radović	12 May 2003 (age 23)	DF	(Montenegro) Jadran m:tel Herceg Novi
Darko Đurović	29 April 2000 (age 26)	GK	(Serbia) VK Šabac Elixir
Srđan Janović	14 November 2006 (age 19)	W	(Montenegro) Jadran m:tel Herceg Novi
Strahinja Gojković	15 March 2007 (age 19)	W	(Montenegro) Jadran m:tel Herceg Novi

=== Coaches ===
- 2006–2011 Petar Porobić
- 2011–2015 Ranko Perović
- 2015–2024 Vladimir Gojković
- 2024–present Dejan Savić

=== Notable players ===
- Aleksandar Ivović
- Trifun Miro Ćirković
- Dejan Dabović
- Đuro Radović
- Igor Gočanin
- Vladimir Gojković
- Zoran Gopčević
- Nikola Janović
- Milorad Krivokapić
- Zoran Mustur
- Đorđe Perišić
- Ranko Perović
- Andrija Popović (Note: one of Montenegrin athletes with the highest number of medals)
- Božidar Stanišić - Cikota
- Milan Tičić
- Veljko Uskoković
- Mirko Vičević (Note: first captain)
- Željko Vičević
- Nenad Vukanić
- Boris Zloković
- Stanko Zloković

== See also ==
- Montenegro men's Olympic water polo team records and statistics
- Serbia and Montenegro men's national water polo team
- Yugoslavia men's national water polo team
