= Ranko Perović =

Serbian water polo player

Personal information
- Nationality: Montenegrin
- Born: 7 April 1968 (age 56)

Sport
- Sport: Water polo

Ranko Perović (born 7 April 1968) is a Montenegrin water polo player and coach. He competed in the men's tournament at the 1996 Summer Olympics.
