= Jarrod Gilchrist =

Australian water polo player (born 1990)

Personal information
- Born: 13 June 1990 (age 36) Melbourne, Australia
- Height: 190 cm (6 ft 3 in)
- Weight: 93 kg (205 lb)

Sport
- Sport: water polo
Medal record
Representing Australia
Summer Universiade
| Gold medal – first place | 2009 Belgrade | Team competition |
- Updated on 19 August 2015

Jarrod Robert Gilchrist (born 13 June 1990) is a water polo player of Australia. He was part of the Australian team at the 2015 World Aquatics Championships, as well as being part of the team which went to the 2016 Olympics in Rio de Janeiro.
