= Serbia men's national water polo team =

Serbia
- FINA code: SRB
- Nickname(s): Делфини / Delfini (The Dolphins)
- Association: Water Polo Association of Serbia
- Confederation: LEN (Europe)
- Head coach: Vladimir Vujasinović
- Captain: Nikola Jakšić
- Most caps: Dejan Savić (444)
- Top scorer(s): Aleksandar Šapić (981)

FINA ranking (since 2008)
- Current: 5 (as of August 2026)
- Highest: 1 (2009–2011, 2014–2019)
- Lowest: 7 (2025)

First international
- Belgium 7–1 Yugoslavia (Bologna, Italy; 31 August 1927) as Serbia; Serbia 13–6 Russia (Belgrade, Serbia; 1 September 2006)

Biggest win
- Yugoslavia 62–0 Guatemala (Kobe, Japan; 24 August 1985) as Serbia; Serbia 31–0 Egypt (Genoa, Italy; 18 June 2008)

Biggest defeat
- Belgium 7–1 Yugoslavia (Bologna, Italy; 31 August 1927) as Serbia; Hungary 16–7 Serbia (Split, Croatia; 31 August 2022); Greece 16–7 Serbia (Kalang, Singapore; 24 July 2025)

Olympic Games (team statistics)
- Appearances: 20 (first in 1936)
- Best result: (gold) (1968 (YUG), 1984 (YUG), 1988 (YUG), 2016, 2020, 2024)
- 4-time Olympian(s): Vladimir Vujasinović (1996–2008); Dejan Savić (1996–2008) Aleksandar Šapić (1996–2008) Duško Pijetlović (2008–2020) Andrija Prlainović (2008–2020) Filip Filipović (2008–2020) Dušan Mandić (2012–2024)
- Most medals: 4-time Duško Pijetlović (2008–2020); Andrija Prlainović (2008–2020) Filip Filipović (2008–2020) Dušan Mandić (2012–2024)
- Most titles: 3-time Dušan Mandić (2012–2024)
- Top scorer(s): Aleksandar Šapić (64 goals, 1996–2008)
- Most saves: Branislav Mitrović (130 saves, 2016–2020)
- Top sprinter(s): Aleksandar Ćirić (40 sprints won, 2000–2008)
- Flag bearer(s): Mirko Sandić (1972); Filip Filipović (2020) Dušan Mandić (2024)

World Championship
- Appearances: 20 (first in 1973)
- Best result: (gold) (1986 (YUG), 1991 (YUG), 2005 (SCG), 2009, 2015)

World Cup
- Appearances: 9 (first in 1997)
- Best result: (gold) (2006, 2010, 2014)

World League
- Appearances: 18 (first in 2003)
- Best result: (gold) (2005, 2006, 2007, 2008, 2010, 2011, 2013, 2014, 2015, 2016, 2017, 2019)

European Championship
- Appearances: 32 (first in 1927)
- Best result: (gold) (1991 (YUG), 2001 (YUG), 2003 (SCG), 2006, 2012, 2014, 2016, 2018, 2026)

Media
- Website: waterpoloserbia.org
Medal record
Event	1st	2nd	3rd
Olympic Games	6	5	3
World Championship	5	2	5
World Cup	5	2	3
World League	12	1	1
European Championship	9	9	5
Europa Cup	0	0	0
Mediterranean Games	4	0	2
Summer Universiade	4	1	2
Total	45	20	21
Men's water polo
Representing FR Yugoslavia / Serbia and Montenegro / Serbia
Olympic Games
Gold medal – first place	2016 Rio de Janeiro	Team
Gold medal – first place	2020 Tokyo	Team
Gold medal – first place	2024 Paris	Team
Silver medal – second place	2004 Athens	Team
Bronze medal – third place	2000 Sydney	Team
Bronze medal – third place	2008 Beijing	Team
Bronze medal – third place	2012 London	Team
World Championship
Gold medal – first place	2005 Montreal	Team
Gold medal – first place	2009 Rome	Team
Gold medal – first place	2015 Kazan	Team
Silver medal – second place	2001 Fukuoka	Team
Silver medal – second place	2011 Shanghai	Team
Bronze medal – third place	1998 Perth	Team
Bronze medal – third place	2003 Barcelona	Team
Bronze medal – third place	2017 Budapest	Team
FINA World Cup
Gold medal – first place	2006 Budapest	
Gold medal – first place	2010 Oradea	
Gold medal – first place	2014 Almaty	
Bronze medal – third place	2002 Belgrade	
Bronze medal – third place	2018 Berlin	
FINA World League
Gold medal – first place	2005 Belgrade	
Gold medal – first place	2006 Athens	
Gold medal – first place	2007 Berlin	
Gold medal – first place	2008 Genova	
Gold medal – first place	2010 Niš	
Gold medal – first place	2011 Firenze	
Gold medal – first place	2013 Chelyabinsk	
Gold medal – first place	2014 Dubai	
Gold medal – first place	2015 Bergamo	
Gold medal – first place	2016 Huizhou	
Gold medal – first place	2017 Ruza	
Gold medal – first place	2019 Belgrade	
Silver medal – second place	2004 Long Beach	
Bronze medal – third place	2009 Podgorica	
European Championship
Gold medal – first place	2001 Budapest	
Gold medal – first place	2003 Kranj	
Gold medal – first place	2006 Belgrade	
Gold medal – first place	2012 Eindhoven	
Gold medal – first place	2014 Budapest	
Gold medal – first place	2016 Belgrade	
Gold medal – first place	2018 Barcelona	
Gold medal – first place	2026 Belgrade	
Silver medal – second place	1997 Seville	
Silver medal – second place	2008 Málaga	
Bronze medal – third place	2010 Zagreb	
European Games
Gold medal – first place	2015 Baku	
Mediterranean Games
Gold medal – first place	1997 Bari	Team
Gold medal – first place	2009 Pescara	Team
Gold medal – first place	2018 Tarragona	Team
Gold medal – first place	2022 Oran	Team
Bronze medal – third place	2005 Almeria	Team
Bronze medal – third place	2026 Taranto	Team
Summer Universiade
Gold medal – first place	1995 Fukuoka	Team
Gold medal – first place	2005 Izmir	Team
Gold medal – first place	2011 Shenzhen	Team
Gold medal – first place	2017 Taipei	Team
Silver medal – second place	2003 Daegu	Team
Bronze medal – third place	2009 Belgrade	Team
Bronze medal – third place	2013 Kazan	Team

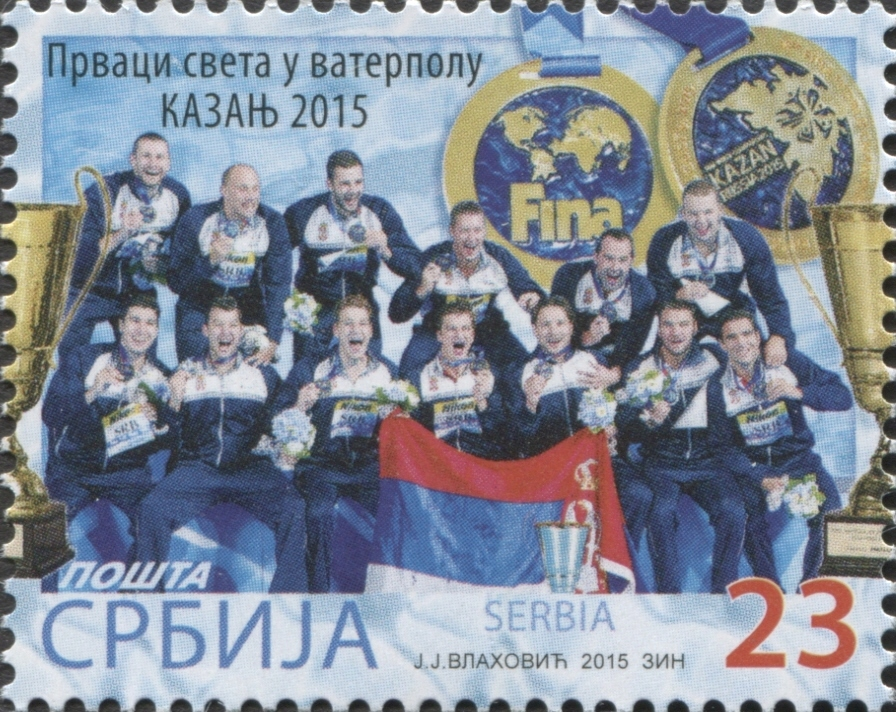
The 2015 world championship team on a Serbian postage stamp

The Serbia men's national water polo team represents Serbia in international men's water polo. It is considered to be one of the most successful men's water polo teams in the world, winning medals in all Olympic tournaments since 2000, including record three consecutive gold medals, and winning multiple European and World Championships.

Serbia has inherited the continuity of results and medals from all former state unions (Yugoslavia, Serbia and Montenegro).

Including the results of the former Yugoslav team, Serbia has won three consecutive gold medals in the Olympic water polo tournament (from 2016 to 2024), five World Championships, eight European Championships, three World Cups, record 14 FINA World Leagues, four gold medals at Mediterranean Games, four gold medals at Summer Universiades and a gold medal at the first and so far only water polo tournament at the European Games. They won nine straight major competitions: the 2014 World League, 2014 Europeans, 2014 World Cup, 2015 World League, 2015 World Championships, 2016 Europeans, 2016 World League, 2016 Olympics, and 2017 World League. Their golden streak came to an end at the 2017 Worlds when Croatia beat them in the semis, and they had to settle for the bronze medal.

In 2016, Serbia became the first national water polo team to simultaneously hold titles in all five existing major championships—European Championship, World Championship, World Cup, World League and Olympic Games. The team holds the record for the most consecutive World League titles, winning five consecutive titles from 2013 to 2017. They are Serbia's most successful national sports team, having won more titles than all other Serbian national teams combined.

== Competitive record ==
=== Medals ===
Includes matches of Yugoslavia, Serbia and Montenegro and Serbia.

Updated after the 2026 Mediterranean Games

Competition	1st place, gold medalist(s)	2nd place, silver medalist(s)	3rd place, bronze medalist(s)	Total
Olympic Games	6	5	3	14
World Championship	5	2	5	12
European Championship	9	9	5	23
World Cup	5	2	3	10
World League	12	1	1	14
Europa Cup	0	0	0	0
Mediterranean Games	4	0	2	6
Summer Universiade	4	1	2	7
Total	45	20	21	86

=== Olympic Games ===
Year	Position
1936 to 1988	part of SFR Yugoslavia
as FR Yugoslavia
(Spain) 1992 Barcelona	suspended
(United States) 1996 Atlanta	8th
(Australia) 2000 Sydney	Bronze medal
as Serbia and Montenegro
(Greece) 2004 Athens	Silver medal
as Serbia
(China) 2008 Beijing	Bronze medal
(United Kingdom) 2012 London	Bronze medal
(Brazil) 2016 Rio de Janeiro	Gold medal
(Japan) 2020 Tokyo	Gold medal
(France) 2024 Paris	Gold medal
(United States) 2028 Los Angeles	future events
(Australia) 2032 Brisbane	future events

=== World Championship ===
Year	Position
1973 to 1991	part of SFR Yugoslavia
as FR Yugoslavia
(Italy) 1994 Rome	suspended
(Australia) 1998 Perth	Bronze medal
(Japan) 2001 Fukuoka	Silver medal
as Serbia and Montenegro
(Spain) 2003 Barcelona	Bronze medal
(Canada) 2005 Montreal	Gold medal
as Serbia
(Australia) 2007 Melbourne	4th
(Italy) 2009 Rome	Gold medal
(China) 2011 Shanghai	Silver medal
(Spain) 2013 Barcelona	7th
(Russia) 2015 Kazan	Gold medal
(Hungary) 2017 Budapest	Bronze medal
(South Korea) 2019 Gwangju	5th
(Hungary) 2022 Budapest	5th
(Japan) 2023 Fukuoka	4th
(Qatar) 2024 Doha	6th
2025 Singapore	4th
(Hungary) 2027 Budapest	future events
(China) 2029 Beijing	future events

=== European Championship ===
Year	Position
1950 to 1991	part of SFR Yugoslavia
as FR Yugoslavia
(United Kingdom) 1993 Sheffield	suspended
(Austria) 1995 Vienna	did not participate
(Spain) 1997 Seville	Silver medal
(Italy) 1999 Florence	7th
(Hungary) 2001 Budapest	Gold medal
as Serbia and Montenegro
(Slovenia) 2003 Kranj	Gold medal
as Serbia
(Serbia) 2006 Belgrade	Gold medal
(Spain) 2008 Malaga	Silver medal
(Croatia) 2010 Zagreb	Bronze medal
(Netherlands) 2012 Eindhoven	Gold medal
(Hungary) 2014 Budapest	Gold medal
(Serbia) 2016 Belgrade	Gold medal
(Spain) 2018 Barcelona	Gold medal
(Hungary) 2020 Budapest	5th
(Croatia) 2022 Split	9th
(Croatia) 2024 Dubrovnik and Zagreb	7th
(Serbia) 2026 Belgrade	Gold medal

=== World Cup ===
Year	Position
1979 to 1991	part of SFR Yugoslavia
as FR Yugoslavia
(Greece) 1993 Athens	suspended
(United States) 1995 Atlanta	did not participate
(Greece) 1997 Athens	7th
(Australia) 1999 Sydney	5th
(Federal Republic of Yugoslavia) 2002 Belgrade	Bronze medal
as Serbia and Montenegro
(Hungary) 2006 Budapest	Gold medal
as Serbia
(Romania) 2010 Oradea	Gold medal
(Kazakhstan) 2014 Almaty	Gold medal
(Germany) 2018 Berlin	Bronze medal
(United States) 2023 Los Angeles	7th
(Romania) 2025 Bucharest	did not qualify
(Australia) 2026 Sydney	did not qualify

=== World League ===
Year	Position
as FR Yugoslavia
(Greece) 2002 Patras	did not participate
as Serbia and Montenegro
(United States) 2003 New York	4th
(United States) 2004 Long Beach	Silver medal
(Serbia and Montenegro) 2005 Belgrade	Gold medal
(Greece) 2006 Athens	Gold medal
as Serbia
(Germany) 2007 Berlin	Gold medal
(Italy) 2008 Genoa	Gold medal
(Montenegro) 2009 Podgorica	Bronze medal
(Serbia) 2010 Niš	Gold medal
(Italy) 2011 Florence	Gold medal
(Kazakhstan) 2012 Almaty	did not participate
(Russia) 2013 Chelyabinsk	Gold medal
(United Arab Emirates) 2014 Dubai	Gold medal
(Italy) 2015 Bergamo	Gold medal
(China) 2016 Huizhou	Gold medal
(Russia) 2017 Ruza	Gold medal
(Hungary) 2018 Budapest	preliminary round
(Serbia) 2019 Belgrade	Gold medal
(Georgia (country)) 2020 Tbilisi	preliminary round
(France) 2022 Strasbourg	5th

=== Europa Cup ===
Year	Position
(Croatia) 2018 Rijeka	4th
(Croatia) 2019 Zagreb	6th

=== Mediterranean Games ===
Year	Position
1959 to 1991	part of SFR Yugoslavia
as FR Yugoslavia
(France) 1993 Languedoc-Roussillon	suspended
(Italy) 1997 Bari	Gold medal
(Tunisia) 2001 Tunis	4th
as Serbia and Montenegro
(Spain) 2005 Almeria	Bronze medal
as Serbia
(Italy) 2009 Pescara	Gold medal
(Turkey) 2013 Tunis	6th
(Spain) 2018 Tarragona	Gold medal
(Algeria) 2022 Oran	Gold medal
(Italy) 2026 Taranto	Bronze medal
(Kosovo) 2030 Pristina	future event

== Team ==
=== Current squad ===
Roster for the 2026 European Championships.

Head coach: Uroš Stevanović

- 1 Radoslav Filipović GK
- 2 Dušan Mandić FP
- 3 Strahinja Rašović FP
- 4 Sava Ranđelović FP
- 5 Miloš Ćuk FP
- 6 Đorđe Lazić FP
- 7 Radomir Drašović FP
- 8 Nikola Jakšić FP
- 9 Nemanja Vico FP
- 10 Nikola Dedović FP
- 11 Petar Jakšić FP
- 12 Viktor Rašović FP
- 13 Milan Glušac GK
- 14 Vasilije Martinović FP
- 15 Nikola Lukić FP

=== Coaches ===
- 1992–1999 Nikola Stamenić
- 1999–2004 Nenad Manojlović
- 2004–2006 Petar Porobić
- 2006–2012 Dejan Udovičić
- 2012–2022 Dejan Savić
- 2022–2026 Uroš Stevanović
- 2026– present Vladimir Vujasinović

=== Most appearances and goals ===
Professional friendly and competitive matches only where Yugoslavia, Serbia and Montenegro and now Serbia were represented.

	Name	Years	Matches	Goals
1	Dejan Savić	1994–2008	444	405
2	Aleksandar Šapić	1997–2008	385	981
3	Filip Filipović	2003–2021	381	677
4	Živko Gocić	2003–2016	362	207
5	Slobodan Nikić	2003–2016	355	354
6	Igor Milanović	1984–1996	349	540
7	Aleksandar Ćirić	1997–2008	346	201
8	Vladimir Vujasinović	1990–2008	341	391
9	Duško Pijetlović	2005–2021	340	472
10	Andrija Prlainović	2005–2021	336	541

Statistics accurate as of matches played 6 August 2021

== Attendance ==
At the final of the European Championship held in Belgrade in 2016, a record attendance was set at a water polo match. The final between Serbia and Montenegro was watched by 18,473 fans.

== Philanthropy ==
On 25 December 2011, Serbia's water polo team was included in a humanitarian action "Bitka za Bebe" ("the Battle for the Babies") playing an exhibition match with the team of the Faculty of Organizational Sciences (FON), in Belgrade. Before the Serbian water polo team had joined the action, many other athletes were included. Among them was the world number one in tennis at that time, Novak Djokovic, football and basketball players of Red Star Belgrade, and many others. Proceeds from the ticket sales went to fund "Bitka za Bebe" and enough money was successfully raised to purchase one hundred incubator.

== See also ==
- Serbia men's Olympic water polo team records and statistics
- Yugoslavia men's national water polo team
- Serbia and Montenegro men's national water polo team
- List of Olympic champions in men's water polo
- List of men's Olympic water polo tournament records and statistics
- List of world champions in men's water polo
