= Petar Porobić =

Montenegrin water polo coach (1957–2023)

Personal information
- Born: 28 May 1957 Kotor, PR Montenegro, FPR Yugoslavia
- Died: 9 October 2023 (aged 66)
Medal record
Men's water polo
Representing Serbia and Montenegro
World Championship
| Gold medal – first place | 2005 Montreal |
Representing Montenegro
European Championship
| Gold medal – first place | 2008 Málaga |

Petar Porobić (Serbian Cyrillic: Петар Поробић; 28 May 1957 – 9 October 2023) was a Montenegrin professional water polo head coach. He was the president of the World Water Polo Coaches Association (WWPCA) from 2015.

Petar Porobić was the selector of the champion generation of Montenegro from the 2008 European Championship. He also won world gold with the State Union of Serbia and Montenegro team in 2005.

Porobić was Nenad Manojlović's first assistant in the FR Yugoslavia/Serbia and Montenegro national team for several years, and at the beginning of 2005 he was entrusted to be the head of the profession. He justified it in the best way because in the same year in Melbourne, the national team reached the world gold in Montreal.

Porobić was the head coach of the China women's national water polo team at the 2020 Summer Olympics in Tokyo, where the team finished in eighth place.

Porobić was also on the bench of Germany. He tied his playing career to Primorac, where he also entered coaching waters. He had other interests as well, but his love for water polo was and remained in the first place.

Petar Porobić died suddenly on 9 October 2023, at the age of 66.

== See also ==
- List of world champions in men's water polo
