= Serbia men's national water polo team statistics =

== Serbia men's national water polo team championship results ==
=== Olympic Games ===
Year	Position
As Kingdom of Serbia
(France) 1900 Paris	didn't participate
(United States) 1904 St.Louis	didn't participate
(United Kingdom) 1908 London	didn't participate
(Sweden) 1912 Stockholm	didn't participate
As Kingdom of Yugoslavia
(Belgium) 1920 Antwerp	didn't participate
(France) 1924 Paris	didn't participate
(Netherlands) 1928 Amsterdam	didn't participate
(United States) 1932 Los Angeles	didn't participate
(Germany) 1936 Berlin	First round
As SFR Yugoslavia
(United Kingdom) 1948 London	Second round
(Finland) 1952 Helsinki	Silver medal
(Australia) 1956 Stockholm	Silver medal
(Italy) 1960 Rome	4th
(Japan) 1964 Tokyo	Silver medal
1968 Mexico City	Gold medal
(West Germany) 1972 Munchen	5th
(Canada) 1976 Montreal	5th
(Soviet Union) 1980 Moscow	Silver medal
(United States) 1984 Los Angeles	Gold medal
(South Korea) 1988 Seoul	Gold medal
As Serbia and Montenegro
(Spain) 1992 Barcelona	suspended
(United States) 1996 Atlanta	8th
(Australia) 2000 Sydney	Bronze medal
(Greece) 2004 Athens	Silver medal
As Serbia
(China) 2008 Beijing	Bronze medal
(United Kingdom) 2012 London	Bronze medal
(Brazil) 2016 Rio de Janeiro	Gold medal
(Japan) 2020 Tokyo	Gold medal
(France) 2024 Paris	Gold medal
Total	20/29

=== World Aquatics Championship ===
Year	Position
As SFR Yugoslavia
(Socialist Federal Republic of Yugoslavia) 1973 Belgrade	Bronze medal
(Colombia) 1975 Cali	13th
(West Germany) 1978 Berlin	Bronze medal
(Ecuador) 1982 Guayaquil	7th
(Spain) 1986 Madrid	Gold medal
(Australia) 1991 Perth	Gold medal
As Serbia and Montenegro
(Italy) 1994 Rome	suspended
(Australia) 1998 Perth	Bronze medal
(Japan) 2001 Fukuoka	Silver medal
(Spain) 2003 Barcelona	Bronze medal
(Canada) 2005 Montreal	Gold medal
As Serbia
(Australia) 2007 Melbourne	4th
(Italy) 2009 Rome	Gold medal
(China) 2011 Shanghai	Silver medal
(Spain) 2013 Barcelona	7th
(Russia) 2015 Kazan	Gold medal
(Hungary) 2017 Budapest	Bronze medal
(South Korea) 2019 Gwangju	5th
(Hungary) 2022 Budapest	5th
(Japan) 2023 Fukuoka	4th
(Qatar) 2024 Doha	6th
2025 Singapore	4th
Total	21/22

=== European Championship ===
Year	Position
As Kingdom of Yugoslavia
(Hungary) 1926 Budapest	didn't participate
(Italy) 1927 Bologna	9th
(France) 1931 Paris	didn't participate
(Germany) 1934 Magdeburg	5th
(United Kingdom) 1938 London	didn't participate
As SFR Yugoslavia
(Monaco) 1947 Monte Carlo	8th
(Austria) 1950 Vienna	Bronze medal
(Italy) 1954 Turin	Silver medal
(Hungary) 1958 Budapest	Silver medal
(East Germany) 1962 Leipzig	Silver medal
(Netherlands) 1966 Utrecht	Bronze medal
(Spain) 1970 Barcelona	Bronze medal
(Austria) 1974 Vienna	Bronze medal
(Sweden) 1977 Jönköping	Silver medal
(Socialist Federal Republic of Yugoslavia) 1981 Split	4th
(Italy) 1983 Rome	4th
(Bulgaria) 1985 Sofia	Silver medal
(France) 1987 Strasbourg	Silver medal
(West Germany) 1989 Bonn	Silver medal
(Greece) 1991 Athens	Gold medal
As Serbia and Montenegro
(United Kingdom) 1993 Sheffield	didn't participate
(Austria) 1995 Vienna	didn't participate
(Spain) 1997 Seville	Silver medal
(Italy) 1999 Florence	7th
(Hungary) 2001 Budapest	Gold medal
(Slovenia) 2003 Kranj	Gold medal
As Serbia
(Serbia) 2006 Belgrade	Gold medal
(Spain) 2008 Malaga	Silver medal
(Croatia) 2010 Zagreb	Bronze medal
(Netherlands) 2012 Eindhoven	Gold medal
(Hungary) 2014 Budapest	Gold medal
(Serbia) 2016 Belgrade	Gold medal
(Spain) 2018 Barcelona	Gold medal
(Hungary) 2020 Budapest	5th
(Croatia) 2022 Split	9th
(Croatia) 2024 Zagreb	7th
(Serbia) 2026 Belgrade	Gold medal
Total	32/37

=== FINA World League ===
Year	Position
As Serbia and Montenegro
(Greece) 2002 Patras	didn't participate
(United States) 2003 New York	4th
(United States) 2004 Long Beach	Silver medal
(Serbia and Montenegro) 2005 Belgrade	Gold medal
(Greece) 2006 Athens	Gold medal
As Serbia
(Germany) 2007 Berlin	Gold medal
(Italy) 2008 Genoa	Gold medal
(Montenegro) 2009 Podgorica	Bronze medal
(Serbia) 2010	Gold medal
(Italy) 2011 Niš	Gold medal
(Kazakhstan) 2012 Almaty	didn't participate
(Russia) 2013 Chelyabinsk	Gold medal
(United Arab Emirates) 2014 Dubai	Gold medal
(Italy) 2015 Bergamo	Gold medal
(China) 2016 Huizhou	Gold medal
(Russia) 2017 Ruza	Gold medal
(Hungary) 2018 Budapest	Preliminary round
(Serbia) 2019 Belgrade	Gold medal
(Georgia (country)) 2020 Tbilisi	Preliminary round
(France) 2022 Strasbourg	5th
Total	18/20

=== FINA Water Polo World Cup ===
Year	Position
As SFR Yugoslavia
(Socialist Federal Republic of Yugoslavia) 1979 Belgrade & Rijeka	Bronze medal
(United States) 1981 Long Beach	Silver medal
(United States) 1983 Malibu	didn't participate
(West Germany) 1985 Duisburg	4th
(Greece) 1987 Thessaloniki	Gold medal
(West Germany) 1989 West Berlin	Gold medal
(Spain) 1991 Barcelona	Silver medal
As Serbia and Montenegro
(Greece) 1993 Athens	didn't participate
(United States) 1995 Atlanta	didn't participate
(Greece) 1997 Athens	7th
(Australia) 1999 Sydney	5th
(Federal Republic of Yugoslavia) 2002 Belgrade	Bronze medal
(Hungary) 2006 Budapest	Gold medal
As Serbia
(Romania) 2010 Oradea	Gold medal
(Kazakhstan) 2014 Almaty	Gold medal
(Germany) 2018 Berlin	Bronze medal
(United States) 2023 Los Angeles	7th
(Montenegro) 2025 Podgorica	9th
Total	15/18

=== Mediterranean Games ===
Year	Position
As SFR Yugoslavia
(Egypt) 1951 Alexandria	didn't participate
(Spain) 1955 Barcelona	didn't participate
(Lebanon) 1959 Beirut	Gold medal
(Italy) 1963 Naples	Silver medal
(Tunisia) 1967 Tunis	Gold medal
(Turkey) 1971 Izmir	Gold medal
(Algeria) 1975 Algiers	Silver medal
(Socialist Federal Republic of Yugoslavia) 1979 Split	Gold medal
(Morocco) 1983 Casablanca	Gold medal
(Syria) 1987 Latakia	didn't participate
(Greece) 1991 Athens	Silver medal
As Serbia and Montenegro
(France) 1993 Languedoc-Roussillon	didn't participate
(Italy) 1997 Bari	Gold medal
(Tunisia) 2001 Tunis	4th
(Spain) 2005 Almeria	Bronze medal
As Serbia
(Italy) 2009 Pescara	Gold medal
(Turkey) 2013 Mersin	6th
(Spain) 2018 Tarragona	Gold medal
(Algeria) 2022 Oran	Gold medal
Total	15/19

== Junior and Youth Results ==
=== World Junior Championship ===
Year	Position
As SFR Yugoslavia
(Italy) 1981	6th
(Spain) 1983	Silver medal
(Turkey) 1985	Bronze medal
(Brazil) 1987	Silver medal
(France) 1989	Gold medal
(United States) 1991	4th
As FR Yugoslavia
(Egypt) 1993	didn't participate
(France) 1995	suspended
(Cuba) 1997	7th
(Kuwait) 1999	Bronze medal
(Turkey) 2001	suspended
As Serbia and Montenegro
(Italy) 2003	Gold medal
(Argentina) 2005	Gold medal
As Serbia
(United States) 2007	4th
(Croatia) 2009	Bronze medal
(Greece) 2011	Gold medal
(Hungary) 2013	Bronze medal
(Kazakhstan) 2015	Gold medal
(Serbia) 2017	Bronze medal
(Kuwait) 2019	Silver medal
(Czech Republic) 2021	Gold medal
(Romania) 2023	Silver medal
(Croatia) 2025	5th

=== World Youth Championship U-18 ===
Year	Position
(Australia) 2012	Bronze medal
(Turkey) 2014	4th
(Montenegro) 2016	5th
(Hungary) 2018	4th
(Serbia) 2022	Silver medal
(Argentina) 2024	Silver medal

=== European U-19 Championship ===
Year	Position
As Serbia and Montenegro
(Malta) 2004	Gold medal
As Serbia
(Romania) 2006	Gold medal
(Turkey) 2008	Bronze medal
(Germany) 2010	4
(France) 2012	Silver medal
(Georgia (country)) 2014	Gold medal
(Netherlands) 2016	Gold medal
(Belarus) 2018	6th
(Montenegro) 2022	Gold medal
(Bulgaria) 2024	7th

=== European Junior Championship ===
Year	Position
As Serbia and Montenegro
(Turkey) 2003	Gold medal
(Bulgaria) 2005	Gold medal
As Serbia
(Malta) 2007	Gold medal
(Serbia) 2008	Silver medal
(Greece) 2009	Bronze medal
(Croatia) 2011	5th
(Malta) 2013	Silver medal
(Azerbaijan) 2015	Gold medal
(Malta) 2017	5th
(Georgia (country)) 2019	6th
(Malta) 2021	Gold medal
(Turkey) 2023	Silver medal
(Romania) 2025	Silver medal

== Player statistics and records ==
=== Most appearances ===
Professional friendly and competitive matches only where Yugoslavia, Serbia and Montenegro and now Serbia were represented.

Name	Years	Matches
(Serbia) Dejan Savić	1994–2008	444
(Serbia) Aleksandar Šapić	1997–2008	385
(Serbia) Filip Filipović	2003–2021	381
(Serbia) Živko Gocić	2003–2016	362
(Serbia) Slobodan Nikić	2003–2016	355
(Serbia) Igor Milanović	1984–1996	349
(Serbia) Aleksandar Ćirić	1997–2008	346
(Serbia) Vladimir Vujasinović	1990–2008	341
(Serbia) Duško Pijetlović	2005–2021	340
(Serbia) Andrija Prlainović	2005–2021	336
(Serbia) Petar Trbojević	1997–2006	306
(Serbia) Danilo Ikodinović	1997–2008	304
(Serbia) Gojko Pijetlović (GK)	2006-2021	275
(Serbia) Dušan Mandić	2011–present	272
(Serbia) Milan Aleksić	2007–2021	270
(Serbia) Stefan Mitrović	2007–2021	267
(Serbia) Sava Ranđelović	2014–present	264
(Serbia) Vanja Udovičić	2002–2013	259
(Serbia) Miloš Ćuk	2009–present	223
(Serbia) / (Montenegro) Denis Šefik (GK)	1997–2008	208
(Serbia) Nikola Jakšić	2015–present	204
(Serbia) Branislav Mitrović (GK)	2005–present	192
(Serbia) Strahinja Rašović	–present	183
(Serbia) Branko Peković	1997–2008	179
(Serbia) Viktor Rašović	–present	173
(Serbia) Slobodan Soro (GK)	2006–2012	148
(Serbia) Radomir Drašović	–present	135
(Serbia) Nikola Rađen	2005–2015	119
(Serbia) Marko Avramović	2007–present	91
(Serbia) Boris Vapenski	2009–present	40
(Serbia) Aleksa Šaponjić	2011–present	10
(Serbia) Miloš Miličić	2010–present	9
(Serbia) Marko Petković	2011–present	6
(Serbia) Luka Šaponjić	2011–present	2

=== Top scorers ===
Professional friendly and competitive matches only where Yugoslavia, Serbia and Montenegro and now Serbia were represented.

Name	Years	Goals
(Serbia) Aleksandar Šapić	1997–2008	981
(Serbia) Filip Filipović	2003–2021	677
(Serbia) Andrija Prlainović	2005–2021	541
(Serbia) Igor Milanović	1984–1996	540
(Serbia) Dušan Mandić	2011–present	507
(Serbia) Duško Pijetlović	2005–2021	472
(Serbia) Dejan Savić	1995–2008	405
(Serbia) Vladimir Vujasinović	1990–2008	391
(Serbia) Vanja Udovičić	2002–2013	360
(Serbia) Slobodan Nikić	2003–2016	354
(Serbia) Danilo Ikodinović	1997–2008	299
(Serbia) Stefan Mitrović	2007–2021	294
(Serbia) Petar Trbojević	1997–2006	231
(Serbia) Živko Gocić	2003–2016	207
(Serbia) Milan Aleksić	2007–2021	202
(Serbia) Aleksandar Ćirić	1997–2008	201
(Serbia) Miloš Ćuk	2009–present	124
(Serbia) Nikola Jakšić	2015–present	111
(Serbia) Branko Peković	1997–2008	104
(Serbia) Sava Ranđelović	2014–present	64
(Serbia) Nikola Rađen	2005–2015	46
(Serbia) Marko Avramović	2007–present	23
(Serbia) Boris Vapenski	2009–present	20
(Serbia) Aleksa Šaponjić	2011–present	3
(Serbia) Marko Petković	2011–present	2

Statistics accurate as of matches played 11 August 2017
