= Water polo at the Mediterranean Games =

Mediterranean sporting tournament; has included water polo since 1951

Water polo has been played consistently at the Mediterranean Games since the year 1951. The Italy men's national water polo team is the most successful team among men, while for women it is the Spain women's national water polo team that gain success with the first inaugural Edition in 2018 Mediterranean Games.

== Men's tournament ==
Year	Host	Gold medal game			Bronze medal game		
Year	Host	Gold medalist	Score	Silver medalist	Bronze medalist	Score	Fourth place
1951; Details	(Egypt); Alexandria	Spain		Egypt	Greece		No Fourth
1955; Details	(Spain); Barcelona	Italy		France	Spain		Egypt
1959; Details	(Lebanon); Beirut	Yugoslavia		Italy	United Arab Republic		Lebanon
1963; Details	(Italy); Naples	Italy		Yugoslavia	France		United Arab Republic
1967; Details	(Tunisia); Tunis	Yugoslavia		Italy	Spain		Greece
1971; Details	(Turkey); İzmir	Yugoslavia		Italy	Spain		Greece
1975; Details	(Algeria); Algiers	Italy		Yugoslavia	Spain		Greece
1979; Details	(Socialist Federal Republic of Yugoslavia); Split	Yugoslavia		Italy	Spain		Greece
1983; Details	(Morocco); Casablanca	Yugoslavia		Spain	Italy		France
1987; Details	(Syria); Latakia	Italy		Spain	Turkey		Greece
1991; Details	(Greece); Athens	Italy		Yugoslavia	Greece		France
1993; Details	(France); Languedoc-Roussillon	Italy		Croatia	Greece		Spain
1997; Details	(Italy); Bari	FR Yugoslavia		Croatia	Spain		Italy
2001; Details	(Tunisia); Tunis	Spain	6–5	Italy	France	6–4	FR Yugoslavia
2005; Details	(Spain); Almería	Spain	9–7	Italy	Serbia and Montenegro	9–8	Croatia
2009; Details	(Italy); Pescara	Serbia	9–4	Spain	Italy	10–9	Croatia
2013; Details	(Turkey); Mersin	Croatia	11–9	Spain	Greece	9–8	Italy
2018; Details	(Spain); Tarragona	Serbia	12–10	Greece	Montenegro	6–4	Spain
2022; Details	(Algeria); Oran	Serbia	9–8	Montenegro	Spain	16–8	Italy
2026; Details	(Italy); Taranto	Italy	18–14	Montenegro	Serbia	12–8	Spain
2030; Details	(Kosovo); Pristina						

== Medals Summary, Men ==
Rank	Nation	Gold	Silver	Bronze	Total
1	Serbia	9	3	2	14
2	Italy	7	6	2	15
3	Spain	3	4	7	14
4	Croatia	1	2	0	3
5	Montenegro	0	2	1	3
6	Greece	0	1	4	5
7	France	0	1	2	3
8	Egypt	0	1	1	2
9	Turkey	0	0	1	1
Totals (9 entries)		20	20	20	60

== Women's tournament ==
Year	Host	Gold medal game			Bronze medal game		
Year	Host	Gold medalist	Score	Silver medalist	Bronze medalist	Score	Fourth place
2018; Details	(Spain); Tarragona	Spain	9 – 8	Italy	Greece	15 – 5	France
2022	(Algeria); Oran	No women's tournament			No women's tournament		
2026	(Italy); Taranto	No women's tournament			No women's tournament		

== Medals Summary, Women ==
Rank	Nation	Gold	Silver	Bronze	Total
1	Spain	1	0	0	1
2	Italy	0	1	0	1
3	Greece	0	0	1	1
Totals (3 entries)		1	1	1	3
