= Turkey men's national water polo team =

Men's national water polo team representing Turkey

Turkey
- FINA code: TUR
- Association: Türkiye Sutopu Federasyonu
- Confederation: LEN (Europe)
- Head coach: Konstantinos Loudis
- Asst coach: Emirhan Otman; Evangelos Patras; Andrea Perazzetti
- Captain: Tugay Ergin
- Top scorer(s): Nadir Sönmez

FINA ranking (since 2008)
- Current: 19 (as of 9 August 2021)

Biggest win
- Turkey 33–6 Finland (9 June 2025)

Biggest defeat
- Turkey 1–27 Greece (16 July 2018)

European Championship
- Appearances: 8 (first in 1966)
- Best result: 10th (2010)

Media
- Website: https://sutopu.org.tr/

The Turkish men's national water polo team was formed in the 1930s.

== Results ==
=== Olympic Games ===
Water polo at the Summer Olympics
Year	Round	Pld	W	D	L	GS	GA	GD
1900–2024	Did not enter	0	0	0	0	0	0	0
Total	0/26	0	0	0	0	0	0	0

=== Olympic Games Qualification ===
Water polo at the Summer Olympics
Year	Round	Pld	W	D	L	GS	GA	GD
2012	7th place	7	1	2	4	56	98	−42
Total	1/14	7	1	2	4	56	98	−42

=== FINA World League ===
FINA Water Polo World League
Year	Round	Pld	W	D	L	GS	GA	GD
2010	Preliminary Round	6	0	0	6	36	87	−51
2011	Preliminary Round	6	0	0	6	20	68	−48
2012	Preliminary Round	6	0	0	6	27	81	−54
2013	Preliminary Round	6	0	0	6	22	104	−82
2015	Preliminary Round	8	1	0	7	40	105	−65
2016	Preliminary Round	6	0	0	6	34	97	−63
Total	6/16	38	1	0	37	179	542	−363

=== European Championship ===
European Water Polo Championship
Year	Round	Pld	W	D	L	GS	GA	GD
1966	16th place	7	0	1	6	6	69	−63
1991	14th place	6	1	1	4	50	88	−38
2010	10th place	8	1	0	7	45	102	−57
2012	12th place	7	0	0	7	33	119	−86
2016	16th place	7	0	1	6	51	110	−59
2018	15th place	5	1	0	4	31	99	−68
2020	12th place	6	1	0	5	40	92	−52
2026	12th place	7	1	0	6	80	136	−56
Total	8/37	53	5	3	45	336	815	−479

=== European Championship Level II ===
European Water Polo Championship
Year	Round	Pld	W	D	L	GS	GA	GD
1987	9th place	4	2	0	2	28	28	0
1994	9th place	2	2	0	0	15	13	+2
1996	-	0	0	0	0	0	0	0
1998	-	0	0	0	0	0	0	0
2000	-	0	0	0	0	0	0	0
2002	4th place	6	4	0	2	39	33	+6
2004	4th place	7	5	0	2	66	40	+24
2007	8th place	7	3	1	3	74	68	+6
2009	Champion	8	7	0	1	87	50	+37
Total	0/0	0	0	0	0	0	0	0

=== LEN Europa Cup ===
LEN Europa Cup
Year	Round	Pld	W	D	L	GS	GA	GD
2018	Did not enter	0	0	0	0	0	0	0
Total	0/1	0	0	0	0	0	0	0

=== FINA World Development Trophy ===
FINA World Water Polo Development Trophy
Year	Round	Pld	W	D	L	GS	GA	GD
2007–2017	ِDid not enter	0	0	0	0	0	0	0
Total	0/6	0	0	0	0	0	0	0

=== Islamic Solidarity Games ===
Islamic Solidarity Games
Year	Round	Pld	W	D	L	GS	GA	GD
2005	Did not enter	0	0	0	0	0	0	0
2017	Champion	4	3	1	0	64	20	+44
Total	1/2	4	3	1	0	64	20	+44

=== Mediterranean Games ===
Water polo at the Mediterranean Games
Year	Round	Pld	W	D	L	GS	GA	GD
1951	Did enter	0	0	0	0	0	0	0
1955	Did enter	0	0	0	0	0	0	0
1959	Did enter	0	0	0	0	0	0	0
1963	Did enter	0	0	0	0	0	0	0
1967	Did enter	0	0	0	0	0	0	0
1971	5th place	0	0	0	0	0	0	0
1975	5th place	0	0	0	0	0	0	0
1979	5th place	0	0	0	0	0	0	0
1983	6th place	0	0	0	0	0	0	0
1987	Third place	0	0	0	0	0	0	0
1991	6th place	0	0	0	0	0	0	0
1993	Did enter	0	0	0	0	0	0	0
1997	Did enter	0	0	0	0	0	0	0
2001	Did enter	0	0	0	0	0	0	0
2005	8th place	4	0	1	3	18	40	−22
2009	8th place	5	0	0	5	33	57	−24
2013	7th place	3	0	0	3	15	39	−24
2018	8th place	4	0	0	4	14	70	−56
10/18	0	0	0	0	0	0	0	

== Current squad ==
Roster for the 2026 Men's European Water Polo Championship.

Head coach: (Greece) Konstantinos Loudis

Name	Date of birth	Pos.	Club
Hüseyin Kağan Kil	23 July 1999 (age 27)	GK	(Turkey) Enka Istanbul
Arda Yener	26 June 2006 (age 20)	DF	(Turkey) Enka Istanbul
Kaan Oğuzcan	19 September 2001 (age 25)	CF	(Greece) Athletic Club Of Palaio Faliro
Fatih Acar	22 November 1998 (age 27)	W	(Turkey) Galatasaray
Tugay Ergin (C)	3 January 1993 (age 33)	DF	(Turkey) Enka Istanbul
Berk Alkan	22 April 1998 (age 28)	CF	(Turkey) Enka Istanbul
Kerem Gemalmazoğlu	21 May 2001 (age 25)	CF	(Germany) ASC Duisburg
Alpman Orhan Arda	25 June 2006 (age 20)	DF	(Turkey) Galatasaray
Efe Naipoglu	5 June 2006 (age 20)	W	(Turkey) Galatasaray
Yutmaz Mehmet	7 July 2002 (age 24)	W	(France) Pays d'Aix Natation
Ege Kahraman	8 March 1999 (age 27)	W	(Turkey) Enka Istanbul
Yuşa Han Düzenli	15 September 2001 (age 25)	W	(Turkey) Enka Istanbul
Mert Meral	5 February 2003 (age 23)	GK	(Turkey) Enka Istanbul
Ege Kahraman	29 January 2005 (age 21)	W	(Turkey) Galatasaray
Efe Kuloğlu	3 December 2001 (age 24)	W	(Turkey) Galatasaray

== See also ==
- Turkey women's national water polo team
- LEN European U19 Water Polo Championship
- LEN European Junior Water Polo Championship
