= 2010 Men's European Water Polo Championship Qualifiers =

The qualifying competition for 2010 Men's European Water Polo Championship is a series of competitions to decide the qualifiers for 2010 Men's European Water Polo Championship.

== Qualification ==
12 teams were allowed to the tournament. The qualification was as follows:

- The worst 6 teams from the 2008 European Championships
- The best 6 teams from the 2009 Men II

Event	Date	Location	Vacancies	Qualified
Host nation	9 July 2016	–	1	Hungary
2008 European Championships	4–13 July 2018	(Spain) Málaga	6	Spain; North Macedonia; Romania; Russia; Greece; Slovakia
2009 Men II	30 April–2 May 2009	Various	6	Turkey; France; Netherlands; Great Britain; Slovenia; Malta

== Draw ==
=== Pots ===
Draw Pot 1	
Spain	7th Place, 2008 Men's European Water Polo Championship
North Macedonia	8th Place, 2008 Men's European Water Polo Championship
Romania	9th Place, 2008 Men's European Water Polo Championship
Draw Pot 2	
Russia	10th Place, 2008 Men's European Water Polo Championship
Greece	11th Place, 2008 Men's European Water Polo Championship
Slovakia	12th Place, 2008 Men's European Water Polo Championship
Draw Pot 3	
Turkey	1st Place, 2009 Men's European Water Polo Championship Level II
France	2nd Place, 2009 Men's European Water Polo Championship Level II
Netherlands	3rd Place, 2009 Men's European Water Polo Championship Level II
Draw Pot 4	
Great Britain	4th Place, 2009 Men's European Water Polo Championship Level II
Slovenia	5th Place, 2009 Men's European Water Polo Championship Level II
Malta	6th Place, 2009 Men's European Water Polo Championship Level II

=== Groups ===
Group A	Group B	Group C
Spain	North Macedonia	Romania
Slovakia	Greece	Russia
Turkey	France	Netherlands
Malta	Slovenia	Great Britain

== Groups ==
=== Group A ===
Pos	Team	Pld	W	D	L	GF	GA	GD	Pts	Qualification
1	Spain	3	3	0	0	45	11	+34	9	2010 European Championships
2	Turkey	3	2	0	1	22	23	−1	6	2010 European Championships
3	Slovakia	3	1	0	2	29	17	+12	3	
4	Malta	3	0	0	3	12	57	−45	0	

30 April 2010; 18:00	Spain	26–2	Malta	Istanbul

30 April 2010; 20:00	Slovakia	5–6	Turkey	Istanbul

1 May 2010; 17:30	Turkey	12–5	Malta	Istanbul

1 May 2010; 19:00	Spain	6–5	Slovakia	Istanbul

2 May 2010; 10:00	Slovakia	19–5	Malta	Istanbul

2 May 2010; 12:00	Spain	13–4	Turkey	Istanbul

=== Group B ===
Pos	Team	Pld	W	D	L	GF	GA	GD	Pts	Qualification
1	North Macedonia	3	3	0	0	27	17	+10	9	2010 European Championships
2	Greece	3	2	0	1	29	23	+6	6	2010 European Championships
3	France	3	1	0	2	27	29	−2	3	
4	Slovenia	3	0	0	3	15	29	−14	0	

30 April 2010; 18:00	France	12–6	Slovenia	Athens

30 April 2010; 20:00	North Macedonia	5–11	Greece	Athens

1 May 2010; 18:00	North Macedonia	9–8	France	Athens

1 May 2010; 20:00	Greece	10–5	Slovenia	Athens

2 May 2010; 19:00	North Macedonia	7–4	Slovenia	Athens

2 May 2010; 20:00	Greece	14–7	France	Athens

=== Group C ===
Pos	Team	Pld	W	D	L	GF	GA	GD	Pts	Qualification
1	Romania	3	3	0	0	42	21	+21	9	2010 European Championships
2	Russia	3	2	0	1	32	25	+7	6	2010 European Championships
3	Netherlands	3	1	0	2	22	30	−8	3	
4	Great Britain	3	0	0	3	16	36	−20	0	

30 April 2010; 16:30	Romania	17–5	Great Britain	Oradea

30 April 2010; 18:15	Russia	11–8	Netherlands	Oradea

1 May 2010; 16:30	Romania	13–6	Netherlands	Oradea

1 May 2010; 18:15	Russia	11–5	Great Britain	Oradea

2 May 2010; 10:30	Romania	12–10	Russia	Oradea

2 May 2010; 12:15	Netherlands	8–6	Great Britain	Athens
