= Italy men's national water polo team =

Italy
- FINA code: ITA
- Nickname(s): Il Settebello
- Association: Italian Swimming Federation
- Confederation: LEN (Europe)
- Head coach: Maurizio Mirarchi
- Asst coach: Christian Presciutti
- Captain: Marco Del Lungo

FINA ranking (since 2008)
- Current: 6 (as of 28 May 2026)
- Highest: 2 (2012, 2016)
- Lowest: 9 (2008, 2009, 2010)

Olympic Games (team statistics)
- Appearances: 22 (first in 1920)
- Best result: (gold) (1948, 1960, 1992)

World Championship
- Appearances: 22 (first in 1973)
- Best result: (gold) (1978, 1994, 2011, 2019)

World Cup
- Appearances: 13 (first in 1979)
- Best result: (gold) (1993)

World League
- Appearances: 19 (first in 2002)
- Best result: (gold) (2022)

European Championship
- Appearances: 35 (first in 1927)
- Best result: (gold) (1947, 1993, 1995)

Europa Cup
- Appearances: 1 (first in 2018)
- Best result: (bronze) (2018)

Mediterranean Games
- Appearances: 17 (first in 1955)
- Best result: (gold) (1955, 1963, 1975, 1987, 1991, 1993, 2026)

Media
- Website: federnuoto.it
Medal record
Olympic Games
Gold medal – first place	1948 London	Team
Gold medal – first place	1960 Rome	Team
Gold medal – first place	1992 Barcelona	Team
Silver medal – second place	1976 Montreal	Team
Silver medal – second place	2012 London	Team
Bronze medal – third place	1952 Helsinki	Team
Bronze medal – third place	1996 Atlanta	Team
Bronze medal – third place	2016 Rio de Janeiro	Team
World Championships
Gold medal – first place	1978 West Berlin	Team
Gold medal – first place	1994 Rome	Team
Gold medal – first place	2011 Shanghai	Team
Gold medal – first place	2019 Gwangju	Team
Silver medal – second place	1986 Madrid	Team
Silver medal – second place	2003 Barcelona	Team
Silver medal – second place	2022 Budapest	Team
Silver medal – second place	2024 Doha	Team
Bronze medal – third place	1975 Cali	Team
World Cup
Gold medal – first place	1993 Athens
Silver medal – second place	1989 West Berlin
Silver medal – second place	1995 Atlanta
Silver medal – second place	1999 Sydney
Silver medal – second place	2023 Los Angeles
Bronze medal – third place	1983 Malibu
Bronze medal – third place	2026 Sydney
World League
Gold medal – first place	2022 Strasbourg
Silver medal – second place	2003 New York
Silver medal – second place	2011 Florence
Silver medal – second place	2017 Ruza
Bronze medal – third place	2012 Almaty
European Championship
Gold medal – first place	1947 Monte Carlo
Gold medal – first place	1993 Sheffield
Gold medal – first place	1995 Vienna
Silver medal – second place	2001 Budapest
Silver medal – second place	2010 Zagreb
Bronze medal – third place	1954 Turin
Bronze medal – third place	1977 Jönköping
Bronze medal – third place	1987 Strasbourg
Bronze medal – third place	1989 Bonn
Bronze medal – third place	1999 Florence
Bronze medal – third place	2014 Budapest
Bronze medal – third place	2024 Eindhoven
Europa Cup
Bronze medal – third place	2018 Rijeka
Mediterranean Games
Gold medal – first place	1955 Barcelona	Team
Gold medal – first place	1963 Naples	Team
Gold medal – first place	1975 Algiers	Team
Gold medal – first place	1987 Latakia	Team
Gold medal – first place	1991 Athens	Team
Gold medal – first place	1993 Languedoc-Roussillon	Team
Gold medal – first place	2026 Taranto	Team
Silver medal – second place	1959 Beirut	Team
Silver medal – second place	1967 Tunis	Team
Silver medal – second place	1971 İzmir	Team
Silver medal – second place	1979 Split	Team
Silver medal – second place	2001 Tunis	Team
Silver medal – second place	2005 Almería	Team
Bronze medal – third place	1983 Casablanca	Team
Bronze medal – third place	2009 Pescara	Team

The Italy national water polo team represents Italy in men's international water polo competitions and is controlled by Federnuoto (the Italian Aquatics Federation). The national men's team has the nickname of "Settebello" (lit. 'Nice Seven'), the term for the seven of diamonds in the Italian card game scopa and a pun on a standard water polo team having seven players.

The Italian men's water polo team has won 8 Olympic medals, 7 World Championships, 5 World Cup, 11 European Championships medals and 3 World League medals, making them one of the most successful men's water polo teams in the world. They have won a combined twelve championships in those five competitions, with the World League, the last competition which Italy won in 2022.

== History ==
The Italian water polo team, of the early 1950s

Water Polo became popular in Italy soon after 1899, when an exhibition match was played at the Bath of Diana in Milan, with the match being described in the press as: "like football but more tiring and difficult, requiring energy and strength beyond the ordinary".

Although a domestic league was soon established, the Italy national water polo team did not first compete at the Olympic Games until the 1920 Olympics, in Antwerp, Belgium, where they were forced to forfeit their first round match, before losing 5–1 to Greece and being eliminated.

The national team first fulfilled their potential at the 1948 Summer Olympics in London, England, when they went undefeated for the whole tournament to claim their first gold medal in the discipline.

The Italian team reclaimed the title of Olympic champions in front of a home crowd at the 1960 Olympics in Rome, Italy. Italy won their third Olympic title at the 1992 Summer Olympics in Barcelona, Spain, beating the hosts and tournament favourites Spain 9–8 after extra time in a thrilling final. Only Hungary (9), and Great Britain (4) have more Olympic titles.

The Italy national side have also won four World Championships, in 1978, 1994, 2011 and 2019, and the World Cup once in 1993. Italy also claimed their first European Championship in 1947.

== Competitive record ==
Competition	1st place, gold medalist(s)	2nd place, silver medalist(s)	3rd place, bronze medalist(s)	Total
Olympic Games	3	2	3	8
World Championship	4	4	1	9
World Cup	1	4	2	7
World League	1	3	1	5
European Championship	3	2	7	12
Europa Cup	0	0	1	1
Universiade	4	4	6	14
Mediterranean Games	6	6	2	14
Total	22	25	23	70

== Results ==
=== Olympic Games ===
Year	Position	Pld	W	D	L
(France) 1900	did not participate				
(United States) 1904	did not participate				
(United Kingdom) 1908	did not participate				
(Sweden) 1912	did not participate				
(Belgium) 1920	10th	2	0	0	2
(France) 1924	11th	1	0	0	1
(Netherlands) 1928	did not participate				
(United States) 1932	did not participate				
(Germany) 1936	did not participate				
(United Kingdom) 1948	1st place, gold medalist(s)	7	6	1	0
(Finland) 1952	3rd place, bronze medalist(s)	8	6	0	2
(Australia) 1956	4th	6	3	0	3
(Italy) 1960	1st place, gold medalist(s)	6	5	1	0
(Japan) 1964	4th	6	3	0	3
(Mexico) 1968	4th	9	6	1	2
(West Germany) 1972	6th	8	3	2	3
(Canada) 1976	2nd place, silver medalist(s)	8	4	3	1
(Soviet Union) 1980	8th	8	4	1	3
(United States) 1984	7th	7	4	2	1
(South Korea) 1988	7th	7	3	2	2
(Spain) 1992	1st place, gold medalist(s)	7	5	2	0
(United States) 1996	3rd place, bronze medalist(s)	8	7	0	1
(Australia) 2000	5th	8	6	0	2
(Greece) 2004	8th	7	4	0	3
(China) 2008	9th	8	4	0	4
(United Kingdom) 2012	2nd place, silver medalist(s)	8	5	1	2
(Brazil) 2016	3rd place, bronze medalist(s)	8	5	0	3
(Japan) 2020	7th	8	4	2	2
(France) 2024	7th	8	4	2	2
Total	22/28	151	91	18	42

=== World Championship ===
Year	Position	Pld	W	D	L
(Socialist Federal Republic of Yugoslavia) 1973	4th	8	5	0	3
(Colombia) 1975	3rd place, bronze medalist(s)	8	4	2	2
(West Germany) 1978	1st place, gold medalist(s)	8	5	3	0
(Ecuador) 1982	9th	7	5	0	2
(Spain) 1986	2nd place, silver medalist(s)	7	5	0	2
(Australia) 1991	6th	7	4	0	3
(Italy) 1994	1st place, gold medalist(s)	7	7	0	0
(Australia) 1998	5th	8	5	1	2
(Japan) 2001	4th	8	4	1	3
(Spain) 2003	2nd place, silver medalist(s)	6	5	0	1
(Canada) 2005	8th	7	2	0	5
(Australia) 2007	5th	7	5	0	2
(Italy) 2009	11th	6	2	0	4
(China) 2011	1st place, gold medalist(s)	6	6	0	0
(Spain) 2013	4th	7	5	0	2
(Russia) 2015	4th	7	3	1	3
(Hungary) 2017	6th	7	4	1	2
(South Korea) 2019	1st place, gold medalist(s)	6	6	0	0
(Hungary) 2022	2nd place, silver medalist(s)	6	4	1	1
(Japan) 2023	5th	6	5	0	1
(Qatar) 2024	2nd place, silver medalist(s)	7	5	2	0
(Singapore) 2025	7th	6	3	1	2
Total	22/22	153	99	13	41

=== FINA World Cup ===
- 1979 – 6th place
- 1983 – (bronze) Bronze medal
- 1985 – 5th place
- 1987 – 5th place
- 1989 – (silver) Silver medal
- 1993 – (gold) Gold medal
- 1995 – (silver) Silver medal
- 1997 – 5th place
- 1999 – (silver) Silver medal
- 2002 – 4th place
- 2006 – 5th place
- 2023 – (silver) Silver medal
- 2026 – (bronze) Bronze medal

=== FINA World League ===
- 2002 – Semi-final round
- 2003 – (silver) Silver medal
- 2004 – 4th place
- 2005 – Semi-final round
- 2006 – Preliminary round
- 2007 – Preliminary round
- 2008 – 7th place
- 2009 – 5th place
- 2010 – Preliminary round
- 2011 – (silver) Silver medal
- 2012 – (bronze) Bronze medal
- 2013 – Preliminary round
- 2014 – Preliminary round
- 2015 – 7th place
- 2016 – 4th place
- 2017 – (silver) Silver medal
- 2018 – Did not participate
- 2019 – Preliminary round
- 2020 – 4th place
- 2022 – (gold) Gold medal

=== European Championship ===
- 1927 – 12th place
- 1934 – 10th place
- 1938 – 5th place
- 1947 – (gold) Gold medal
- 1950 – 4th place
- 1954 – (bronze) Bronze medal
- 1958 – 4th place
- 1962 – 8th place
- 1966 – 4th place
- 1970 – 4th place
- 1974 – 5th place
- 1977 – (bronze) Bronze medal
- 1981 – 6th place
- 1983 – 7th place
- 1985 – 4th place
- 1987 – (bronze) Bronze medal
- 1989 – (bronze) Bronze medal
- 1991 – 4th place
- 1993 – (gold) Gold medal
- 1995 – (gold) Gold medal
- 1997 – 6th place
- 1999 – (bronze) Bronze medal
- 2001 – (silver) Silver medal
- 2003 – 9th place
- 2006 – 5th place
- 2008 – 5th place
- 2010 – (silver) Silver medal
- 2012 – 4th place
- 2014 – (bronze) Bronze medal
- 2016 – 6th place
- 2018 – 4th place
- 2020 – 6th place
- 2022 – 4th place
- 2024 – (bronze) Bronze medal
- 2026 – 4th place

=== Europa Cup ===
- 2018 – (bronze) Bronze medal

=== Mediterranean Games ===
- 1951 – Did not participate
- 1955 – (gold) Gold medal
- 1959 – (silver) Silver medal
- 1963 – (gold) Gold medal
- 1967 – (silver) Silver medal
- 1971 – (silver) Silver medal
- 1975 – (gold) Gold medal
- 1979 – (silver) Silver medal
- 1983 – (bronze) Bronze medal
- 1987 – (gold) Gold medal
- 1991 – (gold) Gold medal
- 1993 – (gold) Gold medal
- 1997 – 4th place
- 2001 – (silver) Silver medal
- 2005 – (silver) Silver medal
- 2009 – (bronze) Bronze medal
- 2013 – 4th place
- 2018 – 5th place
- 2022 – 4th place
- 2026 – (gold) Gold medal

== Current squad ==
Roster for the 2026 Men's European Water Polo Championship.

Head coach: Sandro Campagna

Name	Date of birth	Pos.	Club
Marco Del Lungo (C)	1 March 1990 (age 36)	GK	(Italy) RN Savona
Francesco Cassia	29 March 2002 (age 24)	W	(Italy) Pro Recco
Jacopo Alesiani	18 June 1996 (age 30)	W	(Italy) AN Brescia
Mario Del Basso	14 November 1998 (age 27)	CF	(Italy) AN Brescia
Filippo Ferrero	31 July 2002 (age 24)	W	(Italy) AN Brescia
Edoardo Di Somma	30 August 1996 (age 30)	DF	(Hungary) FTC-Telekom
Vincenzo Dolce	11 May 1995 (age 31)	CF	(Italy) AN Brescia
Tommaso Gianazza	21 July 2002 (age 24)	CF	(Italy) AN Brescia
Matteo Iocchi Gratta	1 September 2002 (age 24)	CF	(Italy) Pro Recco
Lorenzo Bruni	8 April 1994 (age 32)	CF	(Italy) RN Savona
Francesco Condemi	23 December 2003 (age 22)	W	(Italy) Pro Recco
Alessandro Carnesecchi	18 January 2002 (age 24)	W	(Italy) CC Ortigia
Francesco De Michelis	3 September 1999 (age 27)	GK	(Italy) Training Academy Olympic Roma
Alessandro Balzarini	28 November 2003 (age 22)	CF	(Italy) AN Brescia
Mattia Antonucci	2 November 2000 (age 26)	DF	(Italy) Roma Vis Nova

== See also ==
- Italy men's Olympic water polo team records and statistics
- Italy women's national water polo team
- List of Olympic champions in men's water polo
- List of men's Olympic water polo tournament records and statistics
- List of world champions in men's water polo
