= 2018 LEN Men's Europa Cup =

- League: LEN Europa Cup
- Sport: Water polo
- Duration: 15 February–8 April 2018
- Teams: 14

Super Final
- Champions: Croatia
- Runners-up: Spain

LEN Europa Cup seasons
- 2019 →

The 2018 LEN Men's Europa Cup is the inaugural tournament of the LEN Europa Cup.

== Preliminary ==
February 15–18, 2018

=== Group A ===
Pos	Team	Pld	W	D	L	GF	GA	GD	Pts	Qualification	Hungary	France	Spain	Romania	Georgia
1	Hungary (H)	4	4	0	0	43	24	+19	12	Super Final	—	9–5	8–7	10–7	16–5
2	France	4	2	0	2	28	26	+2	6 (Note: France 9–6 Spain)	Super Final		—	9–6		
3	Spain	4	2	0	2	34	26	+8	6	Super Final			—	10–4	
4	Romania	4	1	1	2	23	29	−6	4			7–4		—	5–5
5	Georgia	4	0	1	3	19	42	−23	1			4–10	5–11		—

Source: LEN
(H) Hosts

=== Group B ===
Pos	Team	Pld	W	D	L	GF	GA	GD	Pts	Qualification	Serbia	Greece	Croatia	Netherlands	Malta
1	Serbia	4	3	0	1	51	29	+22	9 (Note: Serbia 3 Pts, 0 GD, 19 GF; Greece 3 Pts, 0 GD, 16 GF; Croatia 3 Pts, 0 GD, 13 GF)	Super Final	—	12–10		15–7	
2	Greece	4	3	0	1	45	25	+20	9	Super Final		—	6–4		20–2
3	Croatia (H)	4	3	0	1	45	22	+23	9	Super Final	9–7		—	16–4	
4	Netherlands	4	1	0	3	30	48	−18	3			7–9		—	12–8
5	Malta	4	0	0	4	18	65	−47	0		3–17		5–16		—

Source: LEN
(H) Hosts

=== Group C ===
Pos	Team	Pld	W	D	L	GF	GA	GD	Pts	Qualification	Italy	Montenegro	Russia	Germany
1	Italy (H)	3	3	0	0	40	19	+21	9	Super Final	—		15–10	16–4
2	Montenegro	3	2	0	1	28	21	+7	6	Super Final	5–9	—	9–8	
3	Russia	3	0	1	2	29	35	−6	1 (Note: Russia 11–11 Germany)				—	11–11
4	Germany	3	0	1	2	19	41	−22	1			4–14		—

Source: LEN
(H) Hosts

== Super Final ==
April 5–8, 2018

Location of the 2018 LEN Men's Europa Cup Super Final

=== Qualified teams ===
Group	Winners	Runners-up	Third
A	Hungary	France	Spain
B	Serbia	Greece	Croatia
C	Italy	Montenegro	

=== Group A ===
Pos	Team	Pld	W	D	L	GF	GA	GD	Pts	Qualification
1	Spain	3	2	0	1	25	23	+2	6 (Note: Italy 4–11 Spain)	Final
2	Italy	3	2	0	1	24	23	+1	6	3rd place game
3	Hungary	3	1	1	1	27	26	+1	4	5th place game
4	Greece	3	0	1	2	22	26	−4	1	7th place game

Source: LEN
Notes:

5 April 2018; 16:00	Report	Hungary	9–9	Greece	Rijeka, Croatia; Referees: Miroslav Vlašić (CRO), Andreja Stanojević (SRB)
5 April 2018; 16:00	Report	Score by quarters: 1–1, 2–5, 3–1, 3–2			Rijeka, Croatia; Referees: Miroslav Vlašić (CRO), Andreja Stanojević (SRB)
5 April 2018; 16:00	Report	Bátori 3	Goals	three players 2	Rijeka, Croatia; Referees: Miroslav Vlašić (CRO), Andreja Stanojević (SRB)

5 April 2018; 17:30	Report	Italy	4–11	Spain	Rijeka, Croatia; Referees: Stanko Ivanovski (MNE), Alban David (FRA)
5 April 2018; 17:30	Report	Score by quarters: 0–3, 1–2, 1–4, 2–2			Rijeka, Croatia; Referees: Stanko Ivanovski (MNE), Alban David (FRA)
5 April 2018; 17:30	Report	four players 1	Goals	five players 2	Rijeka, Croatia; Referees: Stanko Ivanovski (MNE), Alban David (FRA)

6 April 2018; 16:00	Report	Hungary	5–10	Italy	Rijeka, Croatia; Referees: Andreja Stanojević (SRB), Stanko Ivanovski (MNE)
6 April 2018; 16:00	Report	Score by quarters: 0–1, 1–4, 2–2, 2–3			Rijeka, Croatia; Referees: Andreja Stanojević (SRB), Stanko Ivanovski (MNE)
6 April 2018; 16:00	Report	Manhercz 2	Goals	Di Fulvio 3	Rijeka, Croatia; Referees: Andreja Stanojević (SRB), Stanko Ivanovski (MNE)

6 April 2018; 20:30	Report	Spain	7–6	Greece	Rijeka, Croatia; Referees: Alban David (FRA), Miroslav Vlašić (CRO)
6 April 2018; 20:30	Report	Score by quarters: 3–1, 2–1, 1–1, 1–3			Rijeka, Croatia; Referees: Alban David (FRA), Miroslav Vlašić (CRO)
6 April 2018; 20:30	Report	Munarriz, Tahull 2	Goals	Gounas 2	Rijeka, Croatia; Referees: Alban David (FRA), Miroslav Vlašić (CRO)

7 April 2018; 16:00	Report	Italy	10–7	Greece	Rijeka, Croatia; Referees: Stanko Ivanovski (MNE), Miroslav Vlašić (CRO)
7 April 2018; 16:00	Report	Score by quarters: 4–1, 2–2, 2–1, 2–3			Rijeka, Croatia; Referees: Stanko Ivanovski (MNE), Miroslav Vlašić (CRO)
7 April 2018; 16:00	Report	Di Fulvio 3	Goals	Dervisis, Vlachopoulos 2	Rijeka, Croatia; Referees: Stanko Ivanovski (MNE), Miroslav Vlašić (CRO)

7 April 2018; 20:30	Report	Hungary	13–7	Spain	Rijeka, Croatia; Referees: Andreja Stanojević (SRB), Alban David (FRA)
7 April 2018; 20:30	Report	Score by quarters: 3–0, 4–4, 5–1, 1–2			Rijeka, Croatia; Referees: Andreja Stanojević (SRB), Alban David (FRA)
7 April 2018; 20:30	Report	Jansik, Bátori 3	Goals	Granados, Minguell 2	Rijeka, Croatia; Referees: Andreja Stanojević (SRB), Alban David (FRA)

=== Group B ===
Pos	Team	Pld	W	D	L	GF	GA	GD	Pts	Qualification
1	Croatia (H)	3	3	0	0	38	17	+21	9	Final
2	Serbia	3	2	0	1	29	15	+14	6	3rd place game
3	Montenegro	3	1	0	2	20	25	−5	3	5th place game
4	France	3	0	0	3	13	43	−30	0	7th place game

Source: LEN
(H) Hosts

5 April 2018; 19:00	Report	France	5–20	Croatia	Rijeka, Croatia; Referees: David Gomez (ESP), Balázs Székely (HUN)
5 April 2018; 19:00	Report	Score by quarters: 1–6, 2–6, 1–5, 1–3			Rijeka, Croatia; Referees: David Gomez (ESP), Balázs Székely (HUN)
5 April 2018; 19:00	Report	five players 1	Goals	Bušlje, Vrlić 4	Rijeka, Croatia; Referees: David Gomez (ESP), Balázs Székely (HUN)

5 April 2018; 20:30	Report	Serbia	9–5	Montenegro	Rijeka, Croatia; Referees: Raffaele Colombo (ITA), Spyridon Achladiotis (GRE)
5 April 2018; 20:30	Report	Score by quarters: 3–2, 3–1, 2–1, 1–1			Rijeka, Croatia; Referees: Raffaele Colombo (ITA), Spyridon Achladiotis (GRE)
5 April 2018; 20:30	Report	D. Pijetlović, Filipović 2	Goals	five players 1	Rijeka, Croatia; Referees: Raffaele Colombo (ITA), Spyridon Achladiotis (GRE)

6 April 2018; 17:30	Report	Croatia	10–5	Montenegro	Rijeka, Croatia; Referees: Balázs Székely (HUN), Raffaele Colombo (ITA)
6 April 2018; 17:30	Report	Score by quarters: 3–1, 2–1, 4–3, 1–0			Rijeka, Croatia; Referees: Balázs Székely (HUN), Raffaele Colombo (ITA)
6 April 2018; 17:30	Report	Joković 4	Goals	Đurđić 2	Rijeka, Croatia; Referees: Balázs Székely (HUN), Raffaele Colombo (ITA)

6 April 2018; 19:00	Report	Serbia	13–2	France	Rijeka, Croatia; Referees: David Gomez (ESP), Spyridon Achladiotis (GRE)
6 April 2018; 19:00	Report	Score by quarters: 4–1, 1–1, 5–0, 3–0			Rijeka, Croatia; Referees: David Gomez (ESP), Spyridon Achladiotis (GRE)
6 April 2018; 19:00	Report	Subotić 3	Goals	Izdinsky, Marzouki 1	Rijeka, Croatia; Referees: David Gomez (ESP), Spyridon Achladiotis (GRE)

7 April 2018; 17:30	Report	France	6–10	Montenegro	Rijeka, Croatia; Referees: Spyridon Achladiotis (GRE), Balázs Székely (HUN)
7 April 2018; 17:30	Report	Score by quarters: 2–3, 2–2, 1–4, 1–1			Rijeka, Croatia; Referees: Spyridon Achladiotis (GRE), Balázs Székely (HUN)
7 April 2018; 17:30	Report	Canonne, Dino 2	Goals	A. Radović 3	Rijeka, Croatia; Referees: Spyridon Achladiotis (GRE), Balázs Székely (HUN)

7 April 2018; 19:00	Report	Serbia	7–8	Croatia	Rijeka, Croatia; Referees: David Gomez (ESP), Raffaele Colombo (ITA)
7 April 2018; 19:00	Report	Score by quarters: 3–1, 1–0, 1–3, 2–4			Rijeka, Croatia; Referees: David Gomez (ESP), Raffaele Colombo (ITA)
7 April 2018; 19:00	Report	Filipović 3	Goals	Fatović 3	Rijeka, Croatia; Referees: David Gomez (ESP), Raffaele Colombo (ITA)

=== 7th place game ===
8 April 2018; 16:00	Report	Greece	12–4	France	Rijeka, Croatia; Referees: Andreja Stanojević (SRB), Stanko Ivanovski (MNE)
8 April 2018; 16:00	Report	Score by quarters: 4–2, 2–1, 3–1, 3–0			Rijeka, Croatia; Referees: Andreja Stanojević (SRB), Stanko Ivanovski (MNE)
8 April 2018; 16:00	Report	Gounas 3	Goals	Vanpeperstraete 3	Rijeka, Croatia; Referees: Andreja Stanojević (SRB), Stanko Ivanovski (MNE)

=== 5th place game ===
8 April 2018; 17:30	Report	Hungary	7–15	Montenegro	Rijeka, Croatia; Referees: Miroslav Vlašić (CRO), Alban David (FRA)
8 April 2018; 17:30	Report	Score by quarters: 2–4, 1–2, 2–6, 2–3			Rijeka, Croatia; Referees: Miroslav Vlašić (CRO), Alban David (FRA)
8 April 2018; 17:30	Report	Manhercz 2	Goals	Đurđić 6	Rijeka, Croatia; Referees: Miroslav Vlašić (CRO), Alban David (FRA)

=== 3rd place game ===
8 April 2018; 19:00	Report	Italy	10–9	Serbia	Rijeka, Croatia; Referees: David Gomez (ESP), Balázs Székely (HUN)
8 April 2018; 19:00	Report	Score by quarters: 1–3, 3–3, 4–2, 2–1			Rijeka, Croatia; Referees: David Gomez (ESP), Balázs Székely (HUN)
8 April 2018; 19:00	Report	Figlioli, Bodegas 3	Goals	Mandić 3	Rijeka, Croatia; Referees: David Gomez (ESP), Balázs Székely (HUN)

=== Final ===
8 April 2018; 20:30	Report	Spain	9–12	Croatia	Rijeka, Croatia; Referees: Raffaele Colombo (ITA), Spyridon Achladiotis (GRE)
8 April 2018; 20:30	Report	Score by quarters: 1–2, 4–4, 1–3, 3–3			Rijeka, Croatia; Referees: Raffaele Colombo (ITA), Spyridon Achladiotis (GRE)
8 April 2018; 20:30	Report	Munarriz 3	Goals	Fatović 6	Rijeka, Croatia; Referees: Raffaele Colombo (ITA), Spyridon Achladiotis (GRE)

== Final ranking ==
Rank	Team
Gold medal	Croatia
Silver medal	Spain
Bronze medal	Italy
4	Serbia
5	Montenegro
6	Hungary
7	Greece
8	France

2018 LEN Men's Europa Cup champions

Croatia
First title
