= Water polo at the 1991 Mediterranean Games =

Water polo at the 1991 Mediterranean Games was held in Athens, Greece. It was contested by men only.

== Medalists ==
Event	Gold	Silver	Bronze
Men's Competition	Italy	Yugoslavia	Greece

== Standings ==
Rank	Team
1st place, gold medalist(s)	Italy
2nd place, silver medalist(s)	Yugoslavia
3rd place, bronze medalist(s)	Greece
4	France
5	Spain
6	Turkey
