= LEN Europa Cup =

- Sport: Water polo
- Founded: 2018
- Folded: 2019
- Continent: (Europe)
- Last champions: Men's: Hungary (1st title); Women's: Netherlands (1st title)
- Most titles: Men's: Croatia; Hungary (1 title); Women's: Greece; Netherlands (1 title)
- Website: len.eu

The LEN Europa Cup was an event for national water polo teams organized by LEN.

It was first held in 2018 and ran again in 2019 with both men's and women's tournaments. Since the 2019 edition, there have been no further editions or official announcements, and the competition appears to have been discontinued.

== Competition format ==
The competition format consists of two phases: Preliminary and Super Final, each stage being held over a weekend.

== Results ==
=== Men's ===
LEN Men's Europa Cup
Year	Host	Winner	Score	Runner-up	3rd place
2018	Rijeka, Croatia	Croatia	12–9	Spain	Italy
2019	Zagreb, Croatia	Hungary	10–8	Croatia	Spain

=== Women's ===
LEN Women's Europa Cup
Year	Host	Champion	Score	Runner-up	3rd place
2018	Pontevedra, Spain	Greece	9–8	Russia	Spain
2019	Turin, Italy	Netherlands	11–9	Russia	Hungary

== Medal table ==
=== Men's ===
Rank	Nation	Gold	Silver	Bronze	Total
1	Croatia	1	1	0	2
2	Hungary	1	0	0	1
3	Spain	0	1	1	2
4	Italy	0	0	1	1
Totals (4 entries)		2	2	2	6

=== Women's ===
Rank	Nation	Gold	Silver	Bronze	Total
1	Greece	1	0	0	1
1	Netherlands	1	0	0	1
3	Russia	0	2	0	2
4	Hungary	0	0	1	1
4	Spain	0	0	1	1
Totals (5 entries)		2	2	2	6
