= 2002 FINA Men's Water Polo World League =

- League: FINA Water Polo World League
- Sport: Water Polo
- Duration: 28 June – 4 August 2002
- Number of teams: 8
- League champions: Russia

FINA Men's Water Polo World League seasons
- 2003 →

The 2002 FINA Men's Water Polo World League was the first edition of the annual event, organised by the world's governing body in aquatics, the FINA. After two preliminary rounds, the Super Final was held in Patras, Greece from 1 August to 4 August 2002.

== Preliminary round ==
- From 28 June to 28 July 2002

Team qualifies for Super Final
Team is eliminated from qualification

=== Group A ===
Greece automatically qualified for the Super Final as the host country. Only the top place earned qualification, which was taken by Spain. Three points were awarded for a win and one point for a loss.

	Team	G	W	L	GF	GA	Diff	Points
1	Spain	12	10	2	134	97	+37	53
2	Italy	12	9	3	127	89	+38	49
3	Greece	12	5	7	97	115	−18	44
4	Brazil	12	0	12	71	128	−57	-7

=== Group B ===
The top two places, occupied by Hungary and Russia, earned qualification. Three points were awarded for a win and one point for a loss.

	Team	G	W	L	GF	GA	Diff	Points
1	Hungary	12	11	1	150	94	+56	34
2	Russia	12	7	5	102	103	−1	26
3	United States	12	4	8	109	131	−22	20
4	Croatia	12	2	10	106	139	−33	16

== Super Final ==
- From 1 August to 4 August

=== Group stage ===
The top two placed teams in the round-robin advanced to the final against each other, while the two bottom placed teams played for the bronze medal. The Russia–Hungary game was declared a 0–5 loss for both teams. Three points were awarded for a win, one point for a loss.

Team qualifies for final
Team plays for bronze medal

Rank	Team	G	W	L	GF	GA	Diff	Points
1	Russia	3	2	1	25	19	+6	7
2	Spain	3	2	1	30	28	+2	7
3	Hungary	3	1	2	25	19	+6	5
4	Greece	3	0	3	14	38	−24	3

=== Bronze medal match ===
- August 4, 2002

Hungary	13 – 6	Greece

=== Gold medal match ===
- August 4, 2002

Russia	10 – 8	Spain

== Final rankings ==
Rank	Team
1st place, gold medalist(s)	Russia
2nd place, silver medalist(s)	Spain
3rd place, bronze medalist(s)	Hungary
4	Greece
5	Italy
6	United States
7	Croatia
8	Brazil

2002 FINA Men's World League

Russia
First title

== Individual awards ==
Rank	Top scorers	Goals
1	Gabriel Hernández Paz (ESP)	34
1	Tibor Benedek (HUN)	34
3	Tamás Molnár (HUN)	33
4	Gergely Kiss (HUN)	32
5	Alexander Yerishev (RUS)	30
6	Tony Azevedo (USA)	29
6	Dmitri Stratan (RUS)	29

== Statistics ==
- Total goals: 1027
- Total matches: 55
- Goals per match: 18.7
- Total of scorers: 105
