= Water polo at the 2001 Mediterranean Games =

- Dates: 8 – 14 September 2001

The Water Polo Tournament at the 2001 Mediterranean Games was held in the Radès Olympic Swimming Pool in Radès, Tunisia. It was contested by men only.

== Medalists ==
Event	Gold	Silver	Bronze
Men's Competition	Spain	Italy	France

== Teams ==
GROUP A

- Italy
- Slovenia
- Spain
- Tunisia

GROUP B

- Croatia
- France
- Greece
- Turkey
- (Federal Republic of Yugoslavia) FR Yugoslavia

== Preliminary round ==
=== Group A ===
	Team	Points	G	W	D	L	GF	GA	Diff
1.	Italy	6	3	3	0	0	36	14	+22
2.	Spain	4	3	2	0	1	35	14	+21
3.	Slovenia	2	3	1	0	2	19	20	–1
4.	Tunisia	0	3	0	0	3	6	48	–42

- September 8, 2001

Slovenia	10 – 1	Tunisia
Italy	8 – 6	Spain

- September 9, 2001

Spain	10 – 5	Slovenia
Italy	19 – 4	Tunisia

- September 10, 2001

Italy	9 – 4	Slovenia
Spain	19 – 1	Tunisia

=== Group B ===
	Team	Points	G	W	D	L	GF	GA	Diff
1.	(Federal Republic of Yugoslavia) FR Yugoslavia	6	4	3	0	1	36	19	+17
2.	France	6	4	3	0	1	29	24	+5
3.	Croatia	6	4	3	0	1	25	13	+12
4.	Greece	1	4	0	1	3	19	25	–6
5.	Turkey	1	4	0	1	3	19	47	–28

- September 8, 2001

FR Yugoslavia (Federal Republic of Yugoslavia)	16 – 3	Turkey
Croatia	4 – 3	Greece

- September 9, 2001

FR Yugoslavia (Federal Republic of Yugoslavia)	8 – 4	Greece
Croatia	5 – 3	France

- September 10, 2001

France	11 – 7	Turkey
FR Yugoslavia (Federal Republic of Yugoslavia)	5 – 3	Croatia

- September 11, 2001

Greece	7 – 7	Turkey
France	9 – 7	(Federal Republic of Yugoslavia) FR Yugoslavia

- September 12, 2001

Croatia	13 – 2	Turkey
France	6 – 5	Greece

== Final round ==
Semi-finals
Spain	9
(Federal Republic of Yugoslavia) FR Yugoslavia	6
Italy	12
France	2

Final
Spain	6
Italy	5
Third place
France	6
(Federal Republic of Yugoslavia) FR Yugoslavia	4

=== Semi finals ===
- September 13, 2001

Spain	9 – 6	(Federal Republic of Yugoslavia) FR Yugoslavia
Italy	12 – 2	France

=== Finals ===
- September 13, 2001 — 7th/8th place

Greece	10 – 5	Tunisia

- September 13, 2001 — 5th/6th place

Croatia	6 – 4	Slovenia

- September 14, 2001 — Bronze Medal Match

France	6 – 4	(Federal Republic of Yugoslavia) FR Yugoslavia

- September 14, 2001 — Gold Medal Match

Spain	6 – 5	Italy

== Standings ==
Rank	Team
1st place, gold medalist(s)	Spain
2nd place, silver medalist(s)	Italy
3rd place, bronze medalist(s)	France
4	(Federal Republic of Yugoslavia) FR Yugoslavia
5	Croatia
6	Slovenia
7	Greece
8	Tunisia
9	Turkey

== Awards ==
2001 Men's Mediterranean Games champions

Spain
