= Water polo at the 2009 Mediterranean Games =

- Dates: 30 June 2009 – 5 July 2009

Medalists
gold medal	Serbia
silver medal	Spain
bronze medal	Italy

The water polo competition at the 2009 Mediterranean Games took place between June 30 and July 5, 2009 and was contested by 9 teams. The event was in Pescara, Italy and open to men only.

== Participating teams ==
- Croatia
- France
- Greece
- Italy
- Libya
- Montenegro
- Spain
- Serbia
- Turkey

== System ==
The 9 teams were divided into two groups of four and five teams. Teams were awarded three points for a win, one point for a draw. No points were awarded for a defeat. The first and the second in each group advanced to the semi-finals.

== Group stage ==
=== Group A ===
Team	PL	W	D	L	F	A	Diff	Pts
Croatia	3	3	0	0	39	19	+20	9
Spain	3	2	0	1	32	19	+13	6
Greece	3	1	0	2	18	34	−16	3
Turkey	3	0	0	3	19	36	−17	0

June 30

Greece	3 – 14	Croatia
Spain	11 – 4	Turkey

July 1

Greece	11 – 9	Turkey
Spain	10 – 11	Croatia

July 2

Greece	4 – 11	Spain
Turkey	6 – 14	Croatia

=== Group B ===
Team	PL	W	D	L	F	A	Diff	Pts
Italy	3	2	1	0	33	21	+12	7
Serbia	3	2	1	0	24	14	+10	7
Montenegro	3	1	0	2	28	32	−4	3
France	3	0	0	3	25	43	−18	0
Libya	–	–	–	–	–	–	–	–

Libya withdrew from the competition.

June 30

France	5 – 12	Serbia
Italy	14 – 7	Montenegro

July 1

Montenegro	17 – 11	France
Italy	5 – 5	Serbia

July 2

Serbia	7 – 4	Montenegro
Italy	14 – 9	France

== 5th–8th Places ==
Semi-finals
July 4
Greece	7
France	10
July 4
Montenegro	10
Turkey	6

5th place match
July 5
France	5
Montenegro	8
7th place match
July 5
Greece	11
Turkey	8

== Medal round ==
Semi-finals
July 4
Croatia	8
Serbia	14
July 4
Italy	3
Spain	8

Final
July 5
Serbia	9
Spain	4
Third place
July 5
Croatia	9
Italy	10
