= Greece men's national water polo team =

Men's national water polo team representing Greece

Greece
- FINA code: GRE
- Nickname(s): Galanolefki (The Blue-white); Ethniki (The National)
- Association: Hellenic Swimming Federation
- Confederation: LEN (Europe)
- Head coach: Thodoris Vlachos
- Asst coach: Anastasios Schizas; Emmanuel Vassiliades
- Captain: Konstantinos Genidounias
- Top scorer(s): Ioannis Fountoulis

FINA ranking (since 2008)
- Current: 1 (as of 15 September 2026)
- Highest: 1 (2021–2022 / 2026–)
- Lowest: 16 (2011)

Olympic Games (team statistics)
- Appearances: 17 (first in 1920)
- Best result: (silver) (2020)
- 5-time Olympian(s): George Mavrotas (1984–2000); Georgios Afroudakis (1996–2012)
- Top scorer(s): Kyriakos Giannopoulos (44 goals, in Olympic Games, 1980–1992)

World Championship
- Appearances: 19 (first in 1973)
- Best result: (silver) (2023)

World Cup
- Appearances: 11 (first in 1985)
- Best result: (gold) (2026)

World League
- Appearances: 7 (first in 2002)
- Best result: (bronze) (2004, 2006, 2016, 2020)

European Championship
- Appearances: 21 (first in 1970)
- Best result: (bronze) (2026)

Mediterranean Games
- Appearances: 16 (first in 1951)
- Best result: (silver) (2018)

Media
- Website: koe.org.gr (in Greek)
Medal record
Olympic Games
| Silver medal – second place | 2020 Tokyo | Team |
World Championship
| Silver medal – second place | 2023 Fukuoka | Team |
| Bronze medal – third place | 2005 Montreal | Team |
| Bronze medal – third place | 2015 Kazan | Team |
| Bronze medal – third place | 2022 Budapest | Team |
| Bronze medal – third place | 2025 Singapore | Team |
World Cup
| Gold medal – first place | 2026 Sydney |
| Silver medal – second place | 1997 Athens |
| Silver medal – second place | 2025 Podgorica |
World League
| Bronze medal – third place | 2004 Long Beach |
| Bronze medal – third place | 2006 Athens |
| Bronze medal – third place | 2016 Huizhou |
| Bronze medal – third place | 2020 Tbilisi |
European Championship
| Bronze medal – third place | 2026 Belgrade |
Mediterranean Games
| Silver medal – second place | 2018 Tarragona | Team |
| Bronze medal – third place | 1951 Alexandria | Team |
| Bronze medal – third place | 1991 Athens | Team |
| Bronze medal – third place | 1993 Languedoc-Roussillon | Team |
| Bronze medal – third place | 2013 Tarragona | Team |
- Last updated: 25 January 2026

The Greece men's national water polo team represents Greece in international men's water polo competitions and it is organized and run by the Hellenic Swimming Federation.

Greece has a long tradition of strong presence at international level, with their major successes being the silver medal at the 2020 Olympic Games, the gold medal at the 2026 World Cup, and a silver medal won at the World Championship in 2023. The Greeks have also won four bronze medals at the World Championship in 2005, 2015, 2022 and 2025, two silver medals at the World Cup in 1997 and 2025, three bronze medals at the World League in 2004, 2006 and 2016, a bronze medal at the European Water Polo Championship in 2026, as well as one silver (2018) and four bronze medals (1951, 1991, 1993, 2013) at the Mediterranean Games.

Moreover, they have closely missed a medal in the 2016 European Championship, the 2004 Olympic Games, the 2003 World Championship and the 1999 European Championship, ending up in the 4th place in all four of them. Greece is one of only nine national teams in the world to have won (at least) a medal in the World Championship, currently occupying the eighth place on the medal table, one above Germany. They have qualified at least for the quarter-finals in all their World Championship participations since 1994, winning the two aforementioned bronze medals and never finishing below the 6th place from 2001 and on.

== Honours ==
| Competition | 1st place, gold medalist(s) | 2nd place, silver medalist(s) | 3rd place, bronze medalist(s) | Total |
|---|---|---|---|---|
| Olympic Games | – | 1 | – | 1 |
| World Championship | – | 1 | 4 | 5 |
| World Cup | 1 | 2 | – | 3 |
| World League | – | – | 4 | 4 |
| European Championship | – | – | 1 | 1 |
| Mediterranean Games | – | 1 | 4 | 5 |
| Total | 1 | 5 | 13 | 19 |

=== Olympic Games ===
- Silver medal:
  - 2020

=== World Championship ===
- Silver medal:
  - 2023
- Bronze medals:
  - 2005, 2015, 2022, 2025

=== World Cup ===
- Gold medal:
  - 2026
- Silver medal:
  - 1997, 2025

=== World League ===
- Bronze medals:
  - 2004, 2006, 2016, 2020

=== European Championship ===
- Bronze medal:
  - 2026

=== Mediterranean Games ===
- Silver medal:
  - 2018
- Bronze medals:
  - 1951, 1991, 1993, 2013

== Competitive record ==
=== Olympic Games ===
Greece has participated 16 times at the Olympic Games, always present in the tournament since 1980. Their best result is the 2nd place at the 2020 Olympics in Tokyo, after losing 13–10 to Serbia in the gold medal game. The Greeks have secured a quarter-finals' presence in six occasions.

| Year | Position |
|---|---|
| (Belgium) 1920 | 8th |
| (France) 1924 | 13th |
| (United Kingdom) 1948 | 15th |
| (Mexico) 1968 | 14th |
| (West Germany) 1972 | 14th |
| (Soviet Union) 1980 | 10th |
| (United States) 1984 | 8th |
| (South Korea) 1988 | 9th |
| (Spain) 1992 | 10th |
| (United States) 1996 | 6th |
| (Australia) 2000 | 10th |
| (Greece) 2004 | 4th |
| (China) 2008 | 7th |
| (United Kingdom) 2012 | 9th |
| (Brazil) 2016 | 6th |
| (Japan) 2020 | Silver medal |
| (France) 2024 | 5th |
| Total | 17/28 |

=== World Championship ===
Greece has a strong presence at the World Aquatics Championships, where they have been placed third in the world in two occasions. The first was in 2005 in Montreal, after their 11–10 victory over Croatia in the bronze medal game, with Georgios Afroudakis scoring the winning goal, with a spectacular backhand shot, with only 11 seconds left in the overtime. The second one was in 2015 in Kazan, after their penalty shootout win over Italy in the bronze medal game. Greece has qualified at least for the quarter-finals in all their tournament participations since 1994, with a 7th place being their lowest position from 2001 and on when the team qualified.

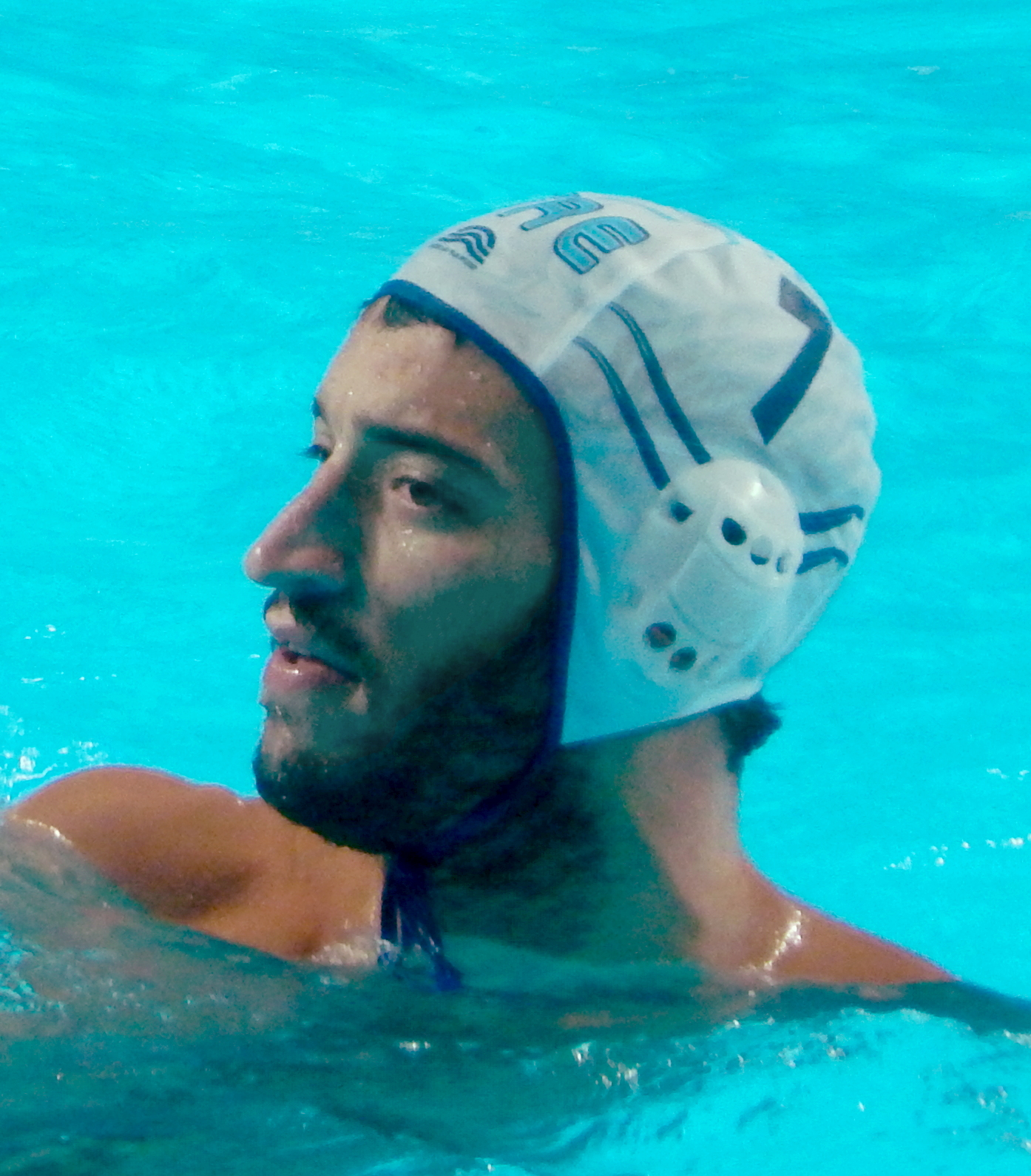
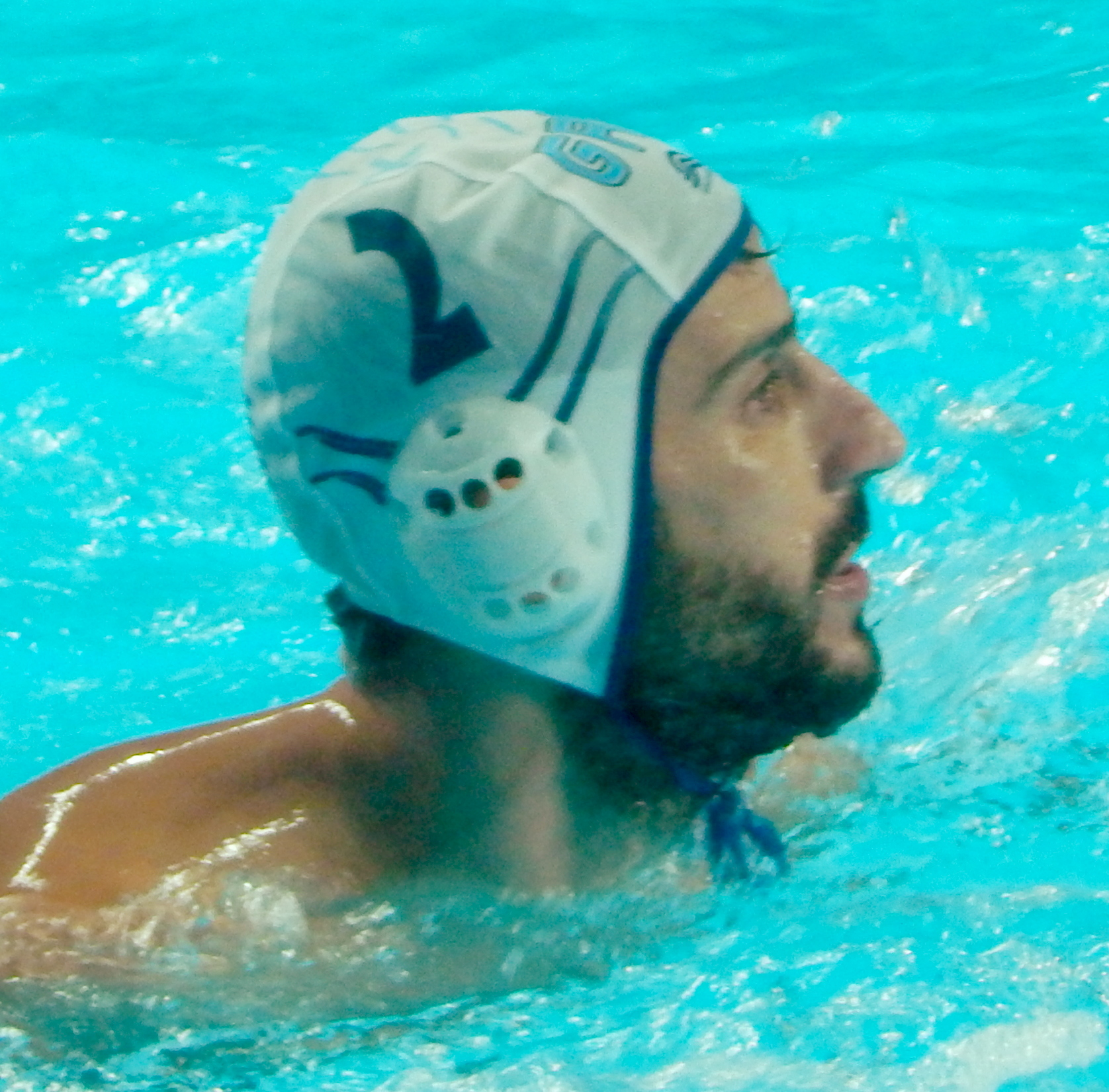
Christos Afroudakis (left) and Manolis Mylonakis (right) are the two players who have won both the 2005 and the 2015 bronze medals of Greece at the World Championship.

| Year | Position |
|---|---|
| (Socialist Federal Republic of Yugoslavia) 1973 | 12th |
| (West Germany) 1978 | 12th |
| (Ecuador) 1982 | 12th |
| (Spain) 1986 | 11th |
| (Australia) 1991 | 10th |
| (Italy) 1994 | 7th |
| (Australia) 1998 | 8th |
| (Japan) 2001 | 6th |
| (Spain) 2003 | 4th |
| (Canada) 2005 | Bronze medal |
| (Australia) 2007 | 6th |
| (Spain) 2013 | 6th |
| (Russia) 2015 | Bronze medal |
| (Hungary) 2017 | 4th |
| (South Korea) 2019 | 7th |
| (Hungary) 2022 | Bronze medal |
| (Japan) 2023 | Silver medal |
| (Qatar) 2024 | 5th |
| (Singapore) 2025 | Bronze medal |
| Total | 19/22 |

=== World Cup ===
Greece had qualified for the FINA Water Polo World Cup in all but two occasions between 1985 and 2006, first winning the silver medal in 1997 in Athens, losing 5–8 to the United States in the final. They have subsequently won another silver medal in 2025, losing to Spain, then won gold in 2026 against Hungary. In the 2026 final in Sydney, Greece defeated Hungary 15–14 to win the first global title in the men's team's history. Captain Stelios Argyropoulos scored the winning goal with 12 seconds remaining and was named the tournament's most valuable player, while Panagiotis Tzortzatos received the best goalkeeper award.

| Year | Position |
|---|---|
| (West Germany) 1985 | 8th |
| (Greece) 1987 | 8th |
| (Greece) 1993 | 7th |
| (United States) 1995 | 6th |
| (Greece) 1997 | Silver medal |
| (Australia) 1999 | 7th |
| (Federal Republic of Yugoslavia) 2002 | 5th |
| (Hungary) 2006 | 7th |
| (United States) 2023 | 5th |
| (Montenegro) 2025 | Silver medal |
| (Australia) 2026 | Gold medal |
| (Greece) 2027 | Qualified |
| Total | 12/20 |

=== World League ===
Greece had a regular presence at the FINA Water Polo World League during the first years of the competition, starting from 2002. They have won four bronze medals so far in 2004, 2006, 2016 and 2020.

| Year | Position |
|---|---|
| (Greece) 2002 | 4th |
| (United States) 2003 | 5th |
| (United States) 2004 | Bronze medal |
| (Serbia and Montenegro) 2005 | 5th |
| (Greece) 2006 | Bronze medal |
| (Italy) 2008 | 8th |
| (China) 2016 | Bronze medal |
| (Georgia (country)) 2020 | Bronze medal |
| Total | 8/20 |

=== European Championship ===
As one of the most competitive European nations in water polo, Greece is a regular contestant at the European Water Polo Championship since 1989, winning a bronze medal in 2026 in Belgrade.

| Year | Position |
|---|---|
| (Spain) 1970 | 10th |
| (Bulgaria) 1985 | 8th |
| (West Germany) 1989 | 11th |
| (Greece) 1991 | 6th |
| (United Kingdom) 1993 | 7th |
| (Austria) 1995 | 9th |
| (Spain) 1997 | 7th |
| (Italy) 1999 | 4th |
| (Hungary) 2001 | 7th |
| (Slovenia) 2003 | 8th |
| (Serbia) 2006 | 6th |
| (Spain) 2008 | 11th |
| (Croatia) 2010 | 9th |
| (Netherlands) 2012 | 6th |
| (Hungary) 2014 | 6th |
| (Serbia) 2016 | 4th |
| (Spain) 2018 | 5th |
| (Hungary) 2020 | 7th |
| (Croatia) 2022 | 5th |
| (Croatia) 2024 | 5th |
| (Serbia) 2026 | Bronze medal |
| Total | 21/37 |

=== LEN Europa Cup ===
| Year | Position |
|---|---|
| (Spain) 2018 | 7th |
| (Italy) 2019 | 7th |

=== Mediterranean Games ===
| Year | Position |
|---|---|
| (Egypt) 1951 | 3rd place, bronze medalist(s) |
| (Tunisia) 1967 | 4th |
| (Turkey) 1971 | 4th |
| (Algeria) 1975 | 4th |
| (Socialist Federal Republic of Yugoslavia) 1979 | 4th |
| (Morocco) 1983 | 5th |
| (Syria) 1987 | 4th |
| (Greece) 1991 | 3rd place, bronze medalist(s) |
| (France) 1993 | 3rd place, bronze medalist(s) |
| (Tunisia) 2001 | 7th |
| (Spain) 2005 | 5th |
| (Italy) 2009 | 7th |
| (Turkey) 2013 | 3rd place, bronze medalist(s) |
| (Spain) 2018 | 2nd place, silver medalist(s) |
| (Algeria) 2022 | 5th |
| (Italy) 2026 | 6th |

== Team ==
=== Current squad ===
Roster for the 2026 World Cup Super Final.

GR – Greece (as of 8 January 2026)
| No. | Player | Pos. | L/R | Height | Weight | Date of birth (age) | Club |
|---|---|---|---|---|---|---|---|
| 1 | Panagiotis Tzortzatos | GK | B | 1.83 m (6 ft 0 in) | 85 kg (187 lb) | 11 May 1992 (age 34) | (Greece) Olympiacos |
| 2 | Aris Chalyvopoulos | D | R | 1.81 m (5 ft 11 in) | | 20 March 2002 (age 24) | (Greece) Panathinaikos |
| 3 | Dimitris Skoumpakis | CB | R | 2.03 m (6 ft 8 in) | 119 kg (262 lb) | 18 December 1998 (age 27) | (Greece) Panathinaikos |
| 4 | Konstantinos Gkiouvetsis | D | R | 1.91 m (6 ft 3 in) | 90 kg (198 lb) | 19 November 1999 (age 26) | (Greece) Panathinaikos |
| 5 | Stelios Argyropoulos (C) | D | B | 1.90 m (6 ft 3 in) | 105 kg (231 lb) | 2 August 1996 (age 30) | (Hungary) Ferencvárosi |
| 6 | Alexandros Papanastasiou | W | R | 1.94 m (6 ft 4 in) | 94 kg (207 lb) | 12 February 1999 (age 27) | (Greece) Olympiacos |
| 7 | Evangelos Pouros | D | R | 1.93 m (6 ft 4 in) | | 27 August 2003 (age 23) | (Greece) Olympiacos |
| 8 | Efstathios Kalogeropoulos | W | R | 1.87 m (6 ft 2 in) | 88 kg (194 lb) | 28 June 2001 (age 25) | (Greece) Panathinaikos |
| 9 | Ioannis Alafragkis | D | R | | | 23 June 1999 (age 27) | (Greece) Olympiacos |
| 10 | Kostas Kakaris | CF | R | 1.98 m (6 ft 6 in) | 115 kg (254 lb) | 2 July 1999 (age 27) | (Hungary) Ferencvárosi |
| 11 | Dimitris Nikolaidis | CF | R | 1.93 m (6 ft 4 in) | 88 kg (194 lb) | 10 June 1999 (age 27) | (Greece) Panathinaikos |
| 12 | Nikos Gardikas | W | R | 1.80 m (5 ft 11 in) | | 20 August 1998 (age 28) | (Greece) GS Apollon Smyrnis |
| 13 | Manos Andreadis | GK | B | 1.87 m (6 ft 2 in) | | 12 June 2002 (age 24) | (Greece) Vouliagmeni |
| 12 | Semir Spachits | CF | R | 1.93 m (6 ft 4 in) | | 18 November 2005 (age 20) | (Greece) Vouliagmeni |
| 15 | Dimitris Chatzis | W | R | 1.90 m (6 ft 3 in) | | 15 January 2008 (age 18) | (Greece) Vouliagmeni |

=== World Championship medal-winning squads ===
The following are the medal-winning Greek rosters in the men's water polo tournaments of the Water polo at the World Aquatics Championships:

2005 World Championship
Bronze Medalists
GREECE

Georgios Reppas
Anastasios Schizas
Dimitrios Mazis
Emmanouil Mylonakis
Theodoros Chatzitheodorou
Argyris Theodoropoulos
Christos Afroudakis
Georgios Ntoskas
Georgios Afroudakis (c)
Stefanos-Petros Santa
Antonios Vlontakis
Manthos Voulgarakis
Nikolaos Deligiannis

Head coach
Alessandro Campagna

2015 World Championship
Bronze Medalists
GREECE

Konstantinos Flegkas
Emmanouil Mylonakis
Georgios Dervisis
Konstantinos Genidounias
Ioannis Fountoulis
Kyriakos Pontikeas
Christos Afroudakis (c)
Evangelos Delakas
Konstantinos Mourikis
Christodoulos Kolomvos
Alexandros Gounas
Angelos Vlachopoulos
Stefanos Galanopoulos

Head coach
Thodoris Vlachos

2022 World Championship
Bronze Medalists
GREECE

Manos Zerdevas
Dinos Genidounias
Dimitris Skoumpakis
Stathis Kalogeropoulos
Yiannis Fountoulis (c)
Alexandros Papanastasiou
Giorgos Dervisis
Stelios Argyropoulos
Costas Gouvis
Costas Kakaris
Dimitris Nikolaidis
Angelos Vlachopoulos
Panagiotis Tzortzatos

Head coach
Thodoris Vlachos

2023 World Championship
Silver Medalists
GREECE

Manos Zerdevas
Dinos Genidounias
Dimitris Skoumpakis
Stathis Kalogeropoulos
Yiannis Fountoulis (c)
Alexandros Papanastasiou
Giorgos Dervisis
Stelios Argyropoulos
Dimitris Nikolaidis
Costas Kakaris
Ioannis Alafragkis
Konstantinos Gkiouvetsis
Panagiotis Tzortzatos
Nikolaos Gkillas
Aristeidis Chalyvopoulos

Head coach
Thodoris Vlachos

2025 World Championship
Bronze Medalists
GREECE

Panagiotis Tzortzatos
Dinos Genidounias (c)
Dimitris Skoumpakis
Konstas Gkiouvetsis
Stelios Argyropoulos
Aris Chalyvopoulos
Nikos Gkillas
Stathis Kalogeropoulos
Zannis Alafragkis
Kostas Kakaris
Dimitris Nikolaidis
Nikos Papanikolaou
Manos Andreadis
Vangelis Pouros
Nikos Gardikas

Head coach
Thodoris Vlachos

=== Notable coaches ===
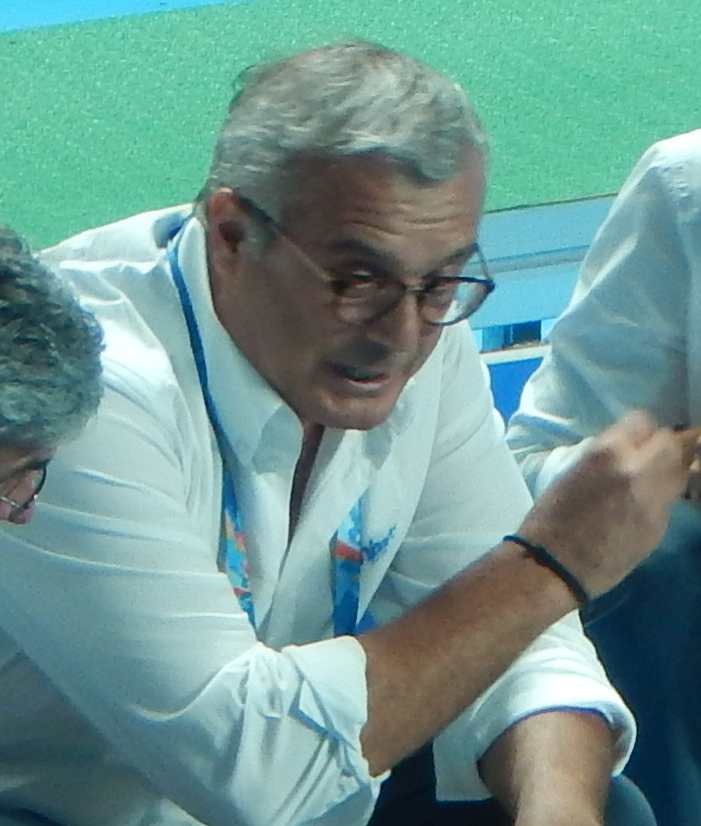
Alessandro Campagna

- (Greece) Andreas Garyfallos
- (Spain) Josep Brasco Cata
- (Croatia) Ivo Trumbić
- (Greece) Kyriakos Iosifidis
- (Croatia) Mile Nakić
- (Greece) Giannis Giannouris
- (Italy) Alessandro Campagna
- (Serbia) Dragan Andrić
- (Greece) Thodoris Vlachos

== See also ==
- Greece men's Olympic water polo team records and statistics
- Greece women's national water polo team
