= 2010 Men's European Water Polo Championship =

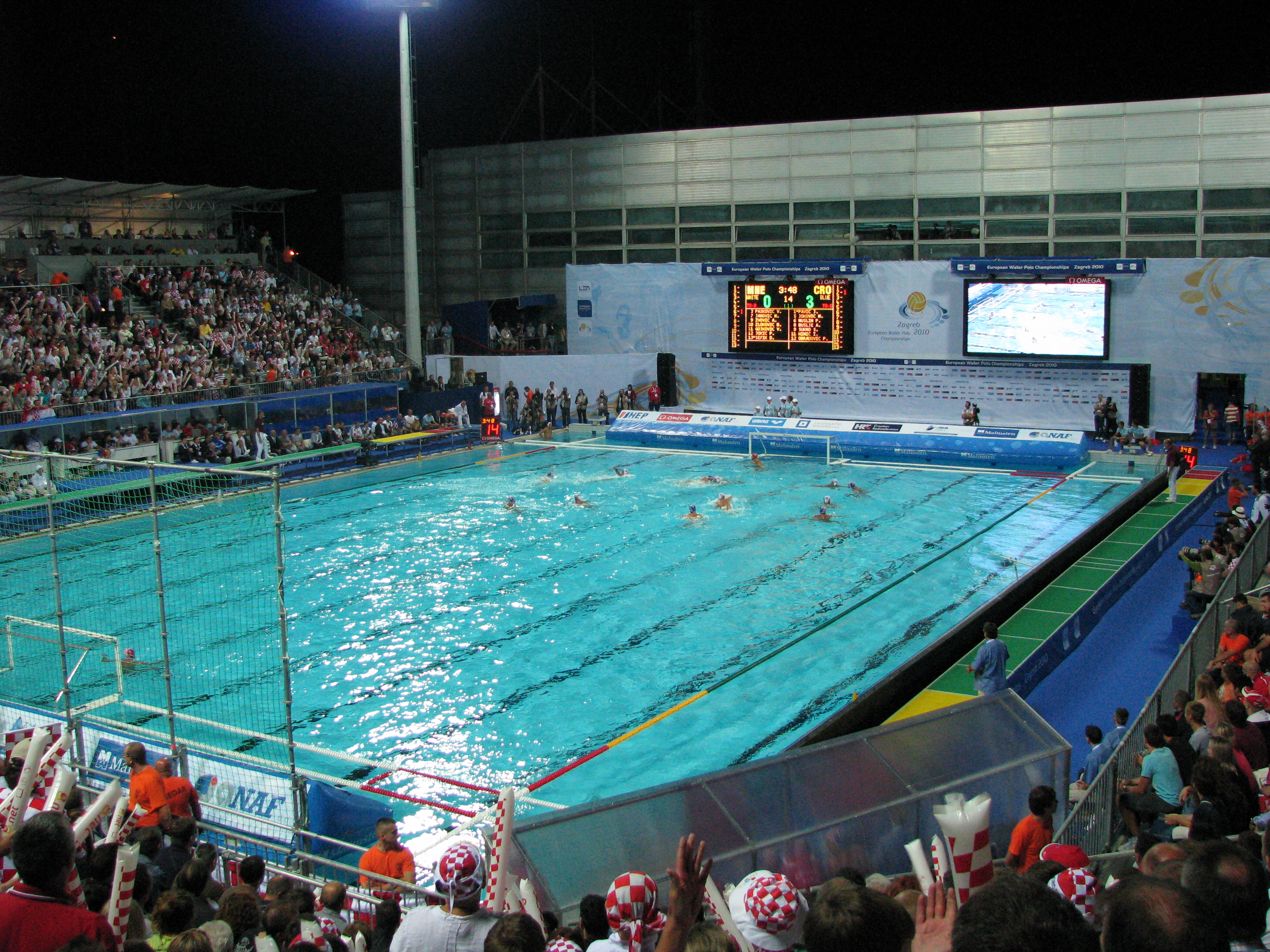
Montenegro vs. Croatia match

The 2010 Men's European Water Polo Championship was the 29th edition of the bi-annual event, organised by the Europe's governing body in aquatics, the Ligue Européenne de Natation. The event took place from 29 August – 11 September at the Sports park Mladost in Zagreb, Croatia.

The decision about host country was brought on the LEN's meeting in Eindhoven in late March 2008.

== Qualification ==
12 teams were allowed to the tournament. The qualification was as follows:

- The host nation
- The best 5 teams from the 2008 European Championships not already qualified as the host nation
- 6 teams from the Qualifiers

Event	Date	Location	Vacancies	Qualified
Host nation	-	–	1	Croatia
2008 European Championships	4–13 July 2008	(Spain) Málaga	5	Montenegro; Serbia; Hungary; Italy; Germany
Qualifiers	30 April-2 May 2010	Various	6	Spain; North Macedonia; Romania; Russia; Greece; Turkey

== Groups ==
Group A	Group B
Montenegro; Croatia; Italy; Romania; Spain; Turkey	Serbia; Hungary; Germany; Greece; Russia; Macedonia

== Preliminary round ==
=== Group A ===
Pos	Team	Pld	W	D	L	GF	GA	GD	Pts	Qualification
1	Croatia	5	4	0	1	54	32	+22	12	Semifinals
2	Italy	5	4	0	1	42	35	+7	12	Quarterfinals
3	Montenegro	5	3	1	1	60	38	+22	10	Quarterfinals
4	Romania	5	2	1	2	46	48	−2	7	7th–10th places
5	Spain	5	1	0	4	41	40	+1	3	7th–12th places
6	Turkey	5	0	0	5	21	71	−50	0	7th–12th places

Updated to match(es) played on unknown. Source:
- First round

29 August 2010; 10:00	Report	Turkey	6–12	Romania	Referees: Stavropoulos (GRE), Wengenroth (SUI)
29 August 2010; 10:00	Report	Score by quarters: 2–3, 2–3, 1–4, 1–2			Referees: Stavropoulos (GRE), Wengenroth (SUI)
29 August 2010; 10:00	Report	Çağatay 3	Goals	Radu 4	Referees: Stavropoulos (GRE), Wengenroth (SUI)

29 August 2010; 18:00	Report	Italy	7–6	Spain	Referees: Margeta (SLO), Juhász (HUN)
29 August 2010; 18:00	Report	Score by quarters: 3–1, 0–1, 2–1, 2–3			Referees: Margeta (SLO), Juhász (HUN)
29 August 2010; 18:00	Report	Aicardi, Presciuti, Felugo 2	Goals	Español 2	Referees: Margeta (SLO), Juhász (HUN)

29 August 2010; 20:40	Report	Montenegro	11–9	Croatia	Referees: Naumov (RUS), Levin (ISR)
29 August 2010; 20:40	Report	Score by quarters: 1–3, 6–2, 1–3, 3–1			Referees: Naumov (RUS), Levin (ISR)
29 August 2010; 20:40	Report	Janović N, Ivović, Zloković, Jokić 2	Goals	Bošković, Bušlje 2	Referees: Naumov (RUS), Levin (ISR)

- Second round

30 August 2010; 11:30	Report	Spain	10–11	Romania	Referees: Stajković (MKD), Hausche (GER)
30 August 2010; 11:30	Report	Score by quarters: 1–2, 2–3, 5–3, 2–3			Referees: Stajković (MKD), Hausche (GER)
30 August 2010; 11:30	Report	Molina, Vallés, García 2	Goals	Matei Guiman, Georgescu 3	Referees: Stajković (MKD), Hausche (GER)

30 August 2010; 13:00	Report	Italy	11–10	Montenegro	Referees: Kun (HUN), Stravridis (GRE)
30 August 2010; 13:00	Report	Score by quarters: 3–2, 3–4, 3–3, 2–1			Referees: Kun (HUN), Stravridis (GRE)
30 August 2010; 13:00	Report	Felugo 3	Goals	Janović 5	Referees: Kun (HUN), Stravridis (GRE)

30 August 2010; 20:40	Report	Croatia	16–3	Turkey	Referees: Ćirić (SRB), Bender (GER)
30 August 2010; 20:40	Report	Score by quarters: 3–2, 4–1, 6–0, 3–0			Referees: Ćirić (SRB), Bender (GER)
30 August 2010; 20:40	Report	Dobud 4	Goals	Okman, Çağatay, Hantal 1	Referees: Ćirić (SRB), Bender (GER)

- Third round

1 September 2010; 11:30	Report	Turkey	4–9	Italy	Referees: Levin (ISR), Kun (HUN)
1 September 2010; 11:30	Report	Score by quarters: 1–2, 1–1, 1–4, 1–2			Referees: Levin (ISR), Kun (HUN)
1 September 2010; 11:30	Report	Okman 2	Goals	Gallo 4	Referees: Levin (ISR), Kun (HUN)

1 September 2010; 18:00	Report	Romania	7–13	Croatia	Referees: Stravridis (GRE), Juhász (HUN)
1 September 2010; 18:00	Report	Score by quarters: 4–3, 1–3, 1–4, 1–3			Referees: Stravridis (GRE), Juhász (HUN)
1 September 2010; 18:00	Report	Radu, Iosepa 2	Goals	Bušlje 6	Referees: Stravridis (GRE), Juhász (HUN)

1 September 2010; 20:40	Report	Montenegro	8–7	Spain	Referees: Naumov (RUS), Bervoets (NED)
1 September 2010; 20:40	Report	Score by quarters: 3–2, 2–2, 2–2, 1–1			Referees: Naumov (RUS), Bervoets (NED)
1 September 2010; 20:40	Report	Janović, Zloković, Jokić 2	Goals	Molina, Vallés, Perrone 2	Referees: Naumov (RUS), Bervoets (NED)

- Fourth round

3 September 2010; 11:30	Report	Montenegro	22–2	Turkey	Referees: Borrell (ESP), Dreval (RUS)
3 September 2010; 11:30	Report	Score by quarters: 5–1, 6–0, 5–0, 6–1			Referees: Borrell (ESP), Dreval (RUS)
3 September 2010; 11:30	Report	Janović M, Ivović, Zloković 4	Goals	Günkut, Güven 1	Referees: Borrell (ESP), Dreval (RUS)

3 September 2010; 18:00	Report	Italy	10–7	Romania	Referees: Naumov (RUS), Stavropoulos (GRE)
3 September 2010; 18:00	Report	Score by quarters: 4–2, 1–1, 2–1, 3–3			Referees: Naumov (RUS), Stavropoulos (GRE)
3 September 2010; 18:00	Report	Figlioli 3	Goals	Radu 3	Referees: Naumov (RUS), Stavropoulos (GRE)

3 September 2010; 20:40	Report	Spain	6–8	Croatia	Referees: Margeta (SLO), Levin (ISR)
3 September 2010; 20:40	Report	Score by quarters: 1–2, 0–1, 2–1, 3–4			Referees: Margeta (SLO), Levin (ISR)
3 September 2010; 20:40	Report	Molina, García 2	Goals	Muslim, Sukno 2	Referees: Margeta (SLO), Levin (ISR)

- Fifth round

5 September 2010; 13:00	Report	Turkey	6–12	Spain	Referees: Dreval (RUS), Bervoets (NED)
5 September 2010; 13:00	Report	Score by quarters: 2–5, 3–1, 0–4, 1–2			Referees: Dreval (RUS), Bervoets (NED)
5 September 2010; 13:00	Report	Okman, Hantal, Beşkardeşler 2	Goals	Gallego 3	Referees: Dreval (RUS), Bervoets (NED)

5 September 2010; 18:00	Report	Romania	9–9	Montenegro	Referees: Stravridis (GRE), Naumov (RUS)
5 September 2010; 18:00	Report	Score by quarters: 3–3, 1–3, 4–1, 1–2			Referees: Stravridis (GRE), Naumov (RUS)
5 September 2010; 18:00	Report	Iosep 3	Goals	Janović, Zloković, Gojković 2	Referees: Stravridis (GRE), Naumov (RUS)

5 September 2010; 20:40	Report	Italy	5–8	Croatia	Referees: Tulga (TUR), Levin (ISR)
5 September 2010; 20:40	Report	Score by quarters: 2–3, 2–1, 1–4, 0–0			Referees: Tulga (TUR), Levin (ISR)
5 September 2010; 20:40	Report	Felugo 2	Goals	Sukno 3	Referees: Tulga (TUR), Levin (ISR)

=== Group B ===
Pos	Team	Pld	W	D	L	GF	GA	GD	Pts	Qualification
1	Hungary	5	4	1	0	46	34	+12	13	Semifinals
2	Serbia	5	4	0	1	71	36	+35	12	Quarterfinals
3	Germany	5	3	0	2	32	45	−13	9	Quarterfinals
4	Greece	5	1	1	3	32	37	−5	4	7th–10th places
5	North Macedonia	5	1	0	4	35	53	−18	3	7th–12th places
6	Russia	5	1	0	4	42	53	−11	3	7th–12th places

Updated to match(es) played on unknown. Source:
- First round

29 August 2010; 11:30	Report	Russia	9–10	Macedonia	Referees: Riccitelli (ITA), Simion (ROU)
29 August 2010; 11:30	Report	Score by quarters: 3–3, 2–2, 2–1, 2–4			Referees: Riccitelli (ITA), Simion (ROU)
29 August 2010; 11:30	Report	Yurchik 3	Goals	Vuksanović 3	Referees: Riccitelli (ITA), Simion (ROU)

29 August 2010; 13:00	Report	Hungary	10–8	Germany	Referees: Franulović (CRO), Brguljan (MNE)
29 August 2010; 13:00	Report	Score by quarters: 3–3, 3–1, 3–1, 1–3			Referees: Franulović (CRO), Brguljan (MNE)
29 August 2010; 13:00	Report	Biros 4	Goals	Roeßing, Oeler, Kreuzmann 2	Referees: Franulović (CRO), Brguljan (MNE)

29 August 2010; 16:30	Report	Serbia	13–5	Greece	Referees: Buch (ESP), Bervoets (NED)
29 August 2010; 16:30	Report	Score by quarters: 2–1, 4–2, 3–1, 4–1			Referees: Buch (ESP), Bervoets (NED)
29 August 2010; 16:30	Report	Udovičić 4	Goals	Papadogkonas, Miralis, Delakas, Afroudakis, Mourikis 1	Referees: Buch (ESP), Bervoets (NED)

- Second round

30 August 2010; 10:00	Report	Germany	7–6	Russia	Referees: Gomes (ITA), Vlašić (CRO)
30 August 2010; 10:00	Report	Score by quarters: 2–0, 1–3, 2–2, 2–1			Referees: Gomes (ITA), Vlašić (CRO)
30 August 2010; 10:00	Report	Oeler 3	Goals	Khalturin, Stratan 2	Referees: Gomes (ITA), Vlašić (CRO)

30 August 2010; 16:30	Report	Serbia	6–9	Hungary	Referees: Borrell (ESP), Tulga (TUR)
30 August 2010; 16:30	Report	Score by quarters: 1–2, 2–1, 0–4, 3–2			Referees: Borrell (ESP), Tulga (TUR)
30 August 2010; 16:30	Report	Filipović 3	Goals	Madaras 3	Referees: Borrell (ESP), Tulga (TUR)

30 August 2010; 18:00	Report	Greece	10–5	Macedonia	Referees: Levin (ISR), Bonnay (FRA)
30 August 2010; 18:00	Report	Score by quarters: 2–2, 4–1, 0–1, 4–1			Referees: Levin (ISR), Bonnay (FRA)
30 August 2010; 18:00	Report	Miralis, Mourikis 2	Goals	Vuksanović, Bosančić, Krečković, Brkić, Latković 1	Referees: Levin (ISR), Bonnay (FRA)

- Third round

1 September 2010; 10:00	Report	Russia	10–16	Serbia	Referees: Gomez (ITA), Vlašić (CRO)
1 September 2010; 10:00	Report	Score by quarters: 2–7, 3–3, 1–1, 4–5			Referees: Gomez (ITA), Vlašić (CRO)
1 September 2010; 10:00	Report	Stratan 3	Goals	Pijetlović, Nikić 3	Referees: Gomez (ITA), Vlašić (CRO)

1 September 2010; 13:00	Report	Macedonia	7–8	Germany	Referees: Tulga (TUR), Franulović (CRO)
1 September 2010; 13:00	Report	Score by quarters: 1–3, 1–3, 4–2, 1–0			Referees: Tulga (TUR), Franulović (CRO)
1 September 2010; 13:00	Report	Delaš 3	Goals	Politze, Oeler, Kreuzmann 2	Referees: Tulga (TUR), Franulović (CRO)

1 September 2010; 16:30	Report	Hungary	6–6	Greece	Referees: Riccitelli (ITA), Margeta (SVN)
1 September 2010; 16:30	Report	Score by quarters: 0–3, 1–0, 3–2, 2–1			Referees: Riccitelli (ITA), Margeta (SVN)
1 September 2010; 16:30	Report	Dá. Varga, Biros 2	Goals	Afroudakis 2	Referees: Riccitelli (ITA), Margeta (SVN)

- Fourth round

3 September 2010; 10:00	Report	Serbia	19–9	Macedonia	Referees: Bonnay (FRA), Gomez (ITA)
3 September 2010; 10:00	Report	Score by quarters: 4–0, 2–1, 7–2, 6–6			Referees: Bonnay (FRA), Gomez (ITA)
3 September 2010; 10:00	Report	Prlainović 5	Goals	Delaš 3	Referees: Bonnay (FRA), Gomez (ITA)

3 September 2010; 13:00	Report	Hungary	14–10	Russia	Referees: Franjulović (CRO), Buch (ESP)
3 September 2010; 13:00	Report	Score by quarters: 5–3, 3–3, 3–1, 3–3			Referees: Franjulović (CRO), Buch (ESP)
3 September 2010; 13:00	Report	Dé. Varga 4	Goals	Yurchik 4	Referees: Franjulović (CRO), Buch (ESP)

3 September 2010; 16:30	Report	Greece	5–6	Germany	Referees: Tulga (TUR), Brguljan (MNE)
3 September 2010; 16:30	Report	Score by quarters: 0–2, 1–1, 2–2, 2–1			Referees: Tulga (TUR), Brguljan (MNE)
3 September 2010; 16:30	Report	Mylonakis 2	Goals	Politze 3	Referees: Tulga (TUR), Brguljan (MNE)

- Fifth round

5 September 2010; 10:00	Report	Serbia	17–3	Germany	Referees: Buch (ESP), Stavropoulos (GRE)
5 September 2010; 10:00	Report	Score by quarters: 4–2, 5–0, 2–0, 6–1			Referees: Buch (ESP), Stavropoulos (GRE)
5 September 2010; 10:00	Report	Udovičić, Filipović 3	Goals	Real, Stamm, Oeler 1	Referees: Buch (ESP), Stavropoulos (GRE)

5 September 2010; 11:30	Report	Russia	7–6	Greece	Referees: Gomez (ITA), Kun (HUN)
5 September 2010; 11:30	Report	Score by quarters: 3–2, 0–0, 2–3, 2–1			Referees: Gomez (ITA), Kun (HUN)
5 September 2010; 11:30	Report	Agarkov 3	Goals	Miralis 3	Referees: Gomez (ITA), Kun (HUN)

5 September 2010; 16:30	Report	Hungary	7–4	Macedonia	Referees: Brguljan (MNE), Hausche (GER)
5 September 2010; 16:30	Report	Score by quarters: 2–0, 2–4, 0–0, 3–0			Referees: Brguljan (MNE), Hausche (GER)
5 September 2010; 16:30	Report	Dé. Varga 3	Goals	Vuksanović 2	Referees: Brguljan (MNE), Hausche (GER)

== 7th–12th Classification ==
=== Bracket ===
Quarterfinals
A6	Turkey	9
B5	North Macedonia	6
A5	Spain	9
B6	Russia	6

Semifinals
A4	Romania	15
Turkey	8
B4	Greece	11
Spain	12
11th–12th
Russia	5
North Macedonia	4

7th–8th
Romania	8
Spain	7
9th–10th
Greece	10
Turkey	7

=== 7th–12th Quarterfinals ===
7 September 2010; 13:00	Report	Spain	9–6	Russia	Referees: Levin (ISR), Simion (ROU)
7 September 2010; 13:00	Report	Score by quarters: 3–0, 2–1, 2–5, 2–0			Referees: Levin (ISR), Simion (ROU)
7 September 2010; 13:00	Report	Molina 3	Goals	Lisunov 4	Referees: Levin (ISR), Simion (ROU)

7 September 2010; 15:00	Report	Turkey	9–6	Macedonia	Referees: Bonnay (FRA), Juhasz (HUN)
7 September 2010; 15:00	Report	Score by quarters: 2–0, 1–2, 3–3, 3–1			Referees: Bonnay (FRA), Juhasz (HUN)
7 September 2010; 15:00	Report	Okman 3	Goals	Brkić 3	Referees: Bonnay (FRA), Juhasz (HUN)

=== 7th–10th Semifinals ===
9 September 2010; 12:00	Report	Spain	12–11 (OT)	Greece	Referees: Ciric (SRB), Hausche (GER)
9 September 2010; 12:00	Report	Score by quarters: 2–3, 3–1, 3–3, 2–3 OT: 2–1			Referees: Ciric (SRB), Hausche (GER)
9 September 2010; 12:00	Report	Garcia 3	Goals	Miralis 3	Referees: Ciric (SRB), Hausche (GER)

9 September 2010; 14:00	Report	Turkey	8–15	Romania	Referees: Levin (ISR), Stravridis (GRE)
9 September 2010; 14:00	Report	Score by quarters: 2–3, 0–6, 3–2, 3–4			Referees: Levin (ISR), Stravridis (GRE)
9 September 2010; 14:00	Report	Hantal 3	Goals	Georgescu 5	Referees: Levin (ISR), Stravridis (GRE)

=== 11th place playoff ===
9 September 2010; 10:00	Report	Russia	5–4	Macedonia	Referees: Stavropoulos (GRE), Vlasic (CRO)
9 September 2010; 10:00	Report	Score by quarters: 1–2, 2–0, 1–0, 1–2			Referees: Stavropoulos (GRE), Vlasic (CRO)
9 September 2010; 10:00	Report	Novoksenov 2	Goals	Benić 2	Referees: Stavropoulos (GRE), Vlasic (CRO)

=== 9th place playoff ===
10 September 2010; 10:00	Report	Greece	10–7	Turkey	Referees: Bender (GER), Franulovic (CRO)
10 September 2010; 10:00	Report	Score by quarters: 4–2, 2–2, 1–1, 3–2			Referees: Bender (GER), Franulovic (CRO)
10 September 2010; 10:00	Report	Gounas 2	Goals	Okman 3	Referees: Bender (GER), Franulovic (CRO)

=== 7th place playoff ===
10 September 2010; 12:00	Report	Spain	7–8	Romania	Referees: Stajkovic (MKD), Bervoets (NED)
10 September 2010; 12:00	Report	Score by quarters: 0–0, 3–4, 0–4, 4–0			Referees: Stajkovic (MKD), Bervoets (NED)
10 September 2010; 12:00	Report	Molina 3	Goals	Radu 3	Referees: Stajkovic (MKD), Bervoets (NED)

== Final round ==
=== Bracket ===
Quarterfinals
A3	Montenegro	5
B2	Serbia	6
A2	Italy	6
B3	Germany	2

Semifinals
A1	Croatia	10
Serbia	9
B1	Hungary	8
Italy	10
5th–6th
Montenegro	14
Germany	6

Gold medal game
Italy	3
Croatia	7
Bronze medal game
Hungary	8
Serbia	10

=== Quarterfinals ===
7 September 2010; 17:45	Report	Italy	6–2	Germany	Referees: Borrell (ESP), Stravridis (GRE)
7 September 2010; 17:45	Report	Score by quarters: 2–1, 2–1, 1–0, 1–0			Referees: Borrell (ESP), Stravridis (GRE)
7 September 2010; 17:45	Report	Figlioli 2	Goals	Bukowski, Oeler 1	Referees: Borrell (ESP), Stravridis (GRE)

7 September 2010; 20:40	Report	Montenegro	5–6	Serbia	Referees: Margeta (SLO), Tulga (TUR)
7 September 2010; 20:40	Report	Score by quarters: 2–1, 1–1, 1–2, 1–2			Referees: Margeta (SLO), Tulga (TUR)
7 September 2010; 20:40	Report	Janovic 2	Goals	Udovičić 4	Referees: Margeta (SLO), Tulga (TUR)

=== Semifinals ===
9 September 2010; 17:45	Report	Serbia	9–10	Croatia	Attendance: 5000; Referees: Naumov (RUS), Borrell(ESP)
9 September 2010; 17:45	Report	Score by quarters: 1–2, 4–4, 2–2, 2–2			Attendance: 5000; Referees: Naumov (RUS), Borrell(ESP)
9 September 2010; 17:45	Report	Gocić 3	Goals	Burić, Bošković 3	Attendance: 5000; Referees: Naumov (RUS), Borrell(ESP)

9 September 2010; 20:40	Report	Italy	10–8	Hungary	Referees: Margeta (SLO), Buch (ESP)
9 September 2010; 20:40	Report	Score by quarters: 2–0, 2–3, 4–3, 2–2			Referees: Margeta (SLO), Buch (ESP)
9 September 2010; 20:40	Report	Figlioli 3	Goals	Madaras 3	Referees: Margeta (SLO), Buch (ESP)

=== 5th place match ===
10 September 2010; 14:00	Report	Germany	6–14	Montenegro	Referees: Kun (HUN), Simion (ROU)
10 September 2010; 14:00	Report	Score by quarters: 0–5, 4–3, 1–2, 1–4			Referees: Kun (HUN), Simion (ROU)
10 September 2010; 14:00	Report	Stamm 2	Goals	Zlokovic, Gojkovic, N. Janovic 3	Referees: Kun (HUN), Simion (ROU)

=== 3rd place match ===
11 September 2010; 17:45	Report	Serbia	10–8	Hungary	Referees: Gomez (ITA), Brguljan (MNE)
11 September 2010; 17:45	Report	Score by quarters: 3–1, 2–2, 2–1, 3–4			Referees: Gomez (ITA), Brguljan (MNE)
11 September 2010; 17:45	Report	Udovicic, Filipovic 3	Goals	Kis, Madaras, Dé. Varga 2	Referees: Gomez (ITA), Brguljan (MNE)

=== Final ===
11 September 2010; 20:40	Report	Croatia	7–3	Italy	Referees: Stravridis (GRE), Tulga (TUR)
11 September 2010; 20:40	Report	Score by quarters: 2–2, 1–0, 2–0, 2–1			Referees: Stravridis (GRE), Tulga (TUR)
11 September 2010; 20:40	Report	Boskovic, Buslje 2	Goals	Luongo, Figlioli, Gallo 1	Referees: Stravridis (GRE), Tulga (TUR)

== Final ranking ==
RANK	TEAM
	Croatia
	Italy
	Serbia
4.	Hungary
5.	Montenegro
6.	Germany
7.	Romania
8.	Spain
9.	Greece
10.	Turkey
11.	Russia
12.	Macedonia

== Awards ==
Top Scorer	Player of the Tournament
(Serbia) Vanja Udovičić	(Serbia) Vanja Udovičić
