= Spyridon Achladiotis =

Greek water polo referee

Spyridon Achladiotis Σπυρίδων Αχλαδιώτης
- Born: July 25, 1989 (age 37); Volos, Greece
- Years active: since 2015
- Known for: water polo refereeing

Spyridon Achladiotis (Greek: Σπυρίδων Αχλαδιώτης; Volos, 1989) is a Greek international water polo referee, who is currently listed at the European Aquatics A+ referee category.

He has officiated at major international tournaments, including the World Aquatics World Cup, the LEN Champions League, and the LEN Euro Cup. In 2024, he officiated at the 2024 Men's World U16 Water Polo Championships.

In June 2026, he officiated the Euro Cup Men final game between VK Jadran Split and CV Marseille.

In September 2026, he was selected and officiated at the Mediterranean Games, held in Taranto, Italy, and later he was the first referee of the final game at the tournament. In this tournament, at the water pole game, Serbia vs. Italy, some controversial refereeing decisions were reported.
