= Water polo at the 1993 Mediterranean Games =

Water polo at the 1993 Mediterranean Games was held in Languedoc-Roussillon, France. It was contested by men only.

== Medalists ==
Event	Gold	Silver	Bronze
Men's Competition	Italy	Croatia	Greece

== Standings ==
Rank	Team
1st place, gold medalist(s)	Italy
2nd place, silver medalist(s)	Croatia
3rd place, bronze medalist(s)	Greece
4	Spain
5	France
