= Water polo at the 1983 Mediterranean Games =

Water polo at the 1983 Mediterranean Games was held in Casablanca, Morocco. It was a men's only event.

== Medalists ==
Event	Gold	Silver	Bronze
Men's Competition	Yugoslavia	Spain	Italy

== Standings ==
Rank	Team
1st place, gold medalist(s)	Yugoslavia
2nd place, silver medalist(s)	Spain
3rd place, bronze medalist(s)	Italy
4	France
5	Greece
6	Turkey
7	Egypt
8	Malta
