= Water polo at the 2005 Mediterranean Games =

- Dates: 29 June 2005 – 3 July 2005

Medalists
gold medal	Spain
silver medal	Italy
bronze medal	Serbia and Montenegro

The Men's Water Polo Tournament at the 2005 Mediterranean Games was held in the Las Almadrabillas Sports Centre from Wednesday June 29 to Sunday July 3, 2005 in Almería, Spain.

== Teams ==
GROUP A

- Croatia
- Greece
- Italy
- Slovenia

GROUP B

- France
- Spain
- Serbia and Montenegro
- Turkey

== Preliminary round ==
=== Group A ===
	Team	Points	G	W	D	L	GF	GA	Diff
1.	Italy	6	3	3	0	0	39	12	+27
2.	Croatia	4	3	2	0	1	22	27	–5
3.	Greece	2	3	1	0	2	16	25	–9
4.	Slovenia	0	3	0	0	3	14	27	–13

- Wednesday June 29, 2005

Greece	6 – 4	Slovenia
Italy	14 – 5	Croatia

- Thursday June 30, 2005

Greece	5 – 9	Croatia
Italy	13 – 3	Slovenia

- Friday July 1, 2005

Italy	12 – 4	Greece
Croatia	8 – 7	Slovenia

=== Group B ===
	Team	Points	G	W	D	L	GF	GA	Diff
1.	Spain	6	3	3	0	0	29	11	+18
2.	Serbia and Montenegro	4	3	2	0	1	25	15	+10
3.	France	1	3	0	1	2	16	28	–12
4.	Turkey	1	3	0	1	2	12	28	–16

- Wednesday June 29, 2005

Serbia and Montenegro	10 – 4	Turkey
Spain	11 – 5	France

- Thursday June 30, 2005

Serbia and Montenegro	10 – 4	France
Spain	11 – 1	Turkey

- Friday July 1, 2005

France	7 – 7	Turkey
Spain	7 – 5	Serbia and Montenegro

== Final round ==
Semi-finals
Spain	8
Croatia	4
Italy	6
Serbia and M	5

Final
Spain	9
Italy	7
Third place
Croatia	8
Serbia and M	9

=== Semi finals ===
- Saturday July 2, 2005

Spain	8 – 4	Croatia
Italy	6 – 5	Serbia and Montenegro

=== Finals ===
- Saturday July 2, 2005 — 7th/8th place

Slovenia	12 – 6	Turkey

- Saturday July 2, 2005 — 5th/6th place

Greece	7 – 6	France

- Sunday July 3, 2005 — Bronze Medal Match

Croatia	8 – 9	Serbia and Montenegro

- Sunday July 3, 2005 — Gold Medal Match

Spain	9 – 7	Italy

== Final ranking ==
RANK	TEAM
	Spain
	Italy
	Serbia and Montenegro
4.	Croatia
5.	Greece
6.	France
7.	Slovenia
8.	Turkey

== Awards ==
2005 Men's Mediterranean Games champions

Spain

== See also ==
- 2005 FINA Men's World Water Polo Championship
- 2006 Men's European Water Polo Championship
