= Water polo at the 1975 Mediterranean Games =

Water polo at the 1975 Mediterranean Games was held in Algiers, Algeria. It was a men's only event.

== Medalists ==
Event	Gold	Silver	Bronze
Men's Competition	Italy	Yugoslavia	Spain

== Standings ==
Rank	Team
1st place, gold medalist(s)	Italy
2nd place, silver medalist(s)	Yugoslavia
3rd place, bronze medalist(s)	Spain
4	Greece
5	Turkey
6	Algeria
