= Water polo at the 1963 Mediterranean Games =

- Dates: 22 – 26 September 1963

Water polo was one of several sports at the 1963 Mediterranean Games. The fourth Mediterranean Games was held in Naples, Italy. Only men's teams participated in the water polo tournament.

== Medalists ==
Event	Gold	Silver	Bronze
Men's Competition	Italy	Yugoslavia	France

== Group matches ==
	Team	Points	G	W	D	L	GF	GA	Diff
1.	Italy	7	4	3	1	0	34	3	+31
2.	Yugoslavia	7	4	3	1	0	26	5	+21
3.	France	4	4	2	0	2	15	16	–1
4.	United Arab Republic	2	4	1	0	3	9	20	–11
5.	Malta	0	4	0	0	4	0	40	–40

- September 22, 1963

France	0 – 10	Italy
Yugoslavia	10 – 0	Malta

- September 23, 1963

United Arab Republic	2 – 8	Yugoslavia
Italy	13 – 0	Malta

- September 24, 1963

France	11 – 0	Malta
Italy	8 – 0	United Arab Republic

- September 25, 1963

France	0 – 5	Yugoslavia
United Arab Republic	6 – 0	Malta

- September 26, 1963

Italy	3 – 3	Yugoslavia
France	4 – 1	United Arab Republic

== Standings ==
Rank	Team
1st place, gold medalist(s)	Italy
2nd place, silver medalist(s)	Yugoslavia
3rd place, bronze medalist(s)	France
4	United Arab Republic
5	Malta
