= Water polo at the 1987 Mediterranean Games =

Water polo at the 1987 Mediterranean Games was held in Latakia, Syria. It was contested by men only.

== Medalists ==
Event	Gold	Silver	Bronze
Men's Competition	Spain	Italy	Turkey

== Standings ==
Rank	Team
1st place, gold medalist(s)	Spain
2nd place, silver medalist(s)	Italy
3rd place, bronze medalist(s)	Turkey
4	Greece
5	Syria
