= Water polo at the 1971 Mediterranean Games =

- Dates: 8–14 October 1971

Water polo was one of several sports at the 1971 Mediterranean Games. The 6th Mediterranean Games was held in İzmir, Turkey. Only men's teams participated in the water polo tournament.

== Medalists ==
| Event | Gold | Silver | Bronze |
|---|---|---|---|
| Men's Competition | Yugoslavia | Italy | Spain |

== Group matches ==
| | Team | Points | G | W | D | L | GF | GA | Diff |
|---|---|---|---|---|---|---|---|---|---|
| 1. | Yugoslavia | 8 | 4 | 4 | 0 | 0 | 38 | 12 | +26 |
| 2. | Italy | 6 | 4 | 3 | 0 | 1 | 28 | 11 | +17 |
| 3. | Spain | 4 | 4 | 2 | 0 | 2 | 27 | 19 | +8 |
| 4. | Greece | 2 | 4 | 1 | 0 | 3 | 12 | 27 | –15 |
| 5. | Turkey | 0 | 4 | 0 | 0 | 4 | 11 | 47 | –36 |

- October 8, 1971

| Greece | 3 – 9 | Spain |
| Italy | 12 – 4 | Turkey |

- October 9, 1971

| Spain | 2 – 5 | Italy |
| Yugoslavia | 17 – 1 | Turkey |

- October 10, 1971

| Yugoslavia | 8 – 1 | Greece |
| Spain | 10 – 3 | Turkey |

- October 11, 1971

| Italy | 7 – 0 | Greece |

- October 12, 1971

| Yugoslavia | 8 – 6 | Spain |

- October 13, 1971

| Greece | 8 – 3 | Turkey |

- October 14, 1971

| Yugoslavia | 5 – 4 | Italy |

== Standings ==
| Rank | Team |
|---|---|
| 1st place, gold medalist(s) | Yugoslavia |
| 2nd place, silver medalist(s) | Italy |
| 3rd place, bronze medalist(s) | Spain |
| 4 | Greece |
| 5 | Turkey |
