= Water polo at the 1967 Mediterranean Games =

- Dates: 9 – 14 September 1967

The Water Polo Tournament at the 1967 Mediterranean Games was held in Tunis, Tunisia. It was contested by men only.

== Medalists ==
Event	Gold	Silver	Bronze
Men's Competition	Yugoslavia	Italy	Spain

== Teams ==
GROUP A

- Greece
- Malta
- Turkey
- Yugoslavia

GROUP B

- Italy
- Spain
- Tunisia

== Preliminary round ==
=== Group A ===
	Team	Points	G	W	D	L	GF	GA	Diff
1.	Yugoslavia	6	3	3	0	0	37	1	+36
2.	Greece	4	3	2	0	1	13	11	+2
3.	Malta	2	3	1	0	2	3	26	–23
4.	Turkey	0	3	0	0	3	6	21	–15

- September 9, 1967

Malta	3 – 2	Turkey
Yugoslavia	8 – 0	Greece

- September 10, 1967

Yugoslavia	17 – 0	Malta
Greece	6 – 3	Turkey

- September 11, 1967

Yugoslavia	12 – 1	Turkey
Greece	7 – 0	Malta

=== Group B ===
	Team	Points	G	W	D	L	GF	GA	Diff
1.	Italy	4	2	2	0	0	16	2	+14
2.	Spain	2	2	1	0	1	8	6	+2
3.	Tunisia	0	2	0	0	2	1	17	–16

- September 9, 1967

Italy	11 – 0	Tunisia

- September 10, 1967

Spain	6 – 1	Tunisia

- September 11, 1967

Italy	5 – 2	Spain

== Final round ==
Semi-finals
Yugoslavia	3
Spain	1
Italy	10
Greece	3

Final
Yugoslavia	8
Italy	7
Third place
Spain	4
Greece	2

=== Semi finals ===
- September 12, 1967

Yugoslavia	3 – 1	Spain
Italy	10 – 3	Greece

=== Finals ===
- September 14, 1967 — 5th/6th place

Tunisia	5 – 4	Malta

- September 14, 1967 — Bronze Medal Match

Spain	4 – 2	Greece

- September 14, 1967 — Gold Medal Match

Yugoslavia	8 – 7	Italy

== Standings ==
Rank	Team
1st place, gold medalist(s)	Yugoslavia
2nd place, silver medalist(s)	Italy
3rd place, bronze medalist(s)	Spain
4	Greece
5	Tunisia
6	Malta
7	Turkey
