= Water polo at the 1955 Mediterranean Games =

- Dates: 21 – 24 July 1955

Water polo was one of several sports at the 1955 Mediterranean Games. The second Mediterranean Games was held in Barcelona, Spain. Only men's teams participated in the water polo tournament.

== Medalists ==
Event	Gold	Silver	Bronze
Men's Competition	Italy	France	Spain

== Group matches ==
	Team	Points	G	W	D	L	GF	GA	Diff
1.	Italy	6	3	3	0	0	12	3	+9
2.	France	3	3	1	1	1	7	9	–2
3.	Spain	2	3	1	0	2	10	10	0
4.	Egypt	1	3	0	1	2	5	12	–7

- July 21, 1955

Spain	3 – 4	France

- July 22, 1955

Egypt	1 – 4	Italy

- July 23, 1955

Italy	4 – 1	France
Spain	6 – 2	Egypt

- July 24, 1955

Spain	1 – 4	Italy
France	2 – 2	Egypt

== Standings ==
Rank	Team
1st place, gold medalist(s)	Italy
2nd place, silver medalist(s)	France
3rd place, bronze medalist(s)	Spain
4	Egypt
