= Water polo at the 1959 Mediterranean Games =

- Dates: 12 – 15 October 1959

Water polo was one of several sports at the 1959 Mediterranean Games. The third Mediterranean Games was held in Beirut, Lebanon. Only men's teams participated in the water polo tournament.

== Medalists ==
Event	Gold	Silver	Bronze
Men's Competition	Yugoslavia	Italy	United Arab Republic

== Group matches ==
	Team	Points	G	W	D	L	GF	GA	Diff
1.	Yugoslavia	6	3	3	0	0	39	3	+36
2.	Italy	4	3	2	0	1	31	6	+25
3.	United Arab Republic	2	3	1	0	2	21	16	+5
4.	Lebanon	0	3	0	0	3	2	68	–66

- October 12, 1959

Yugoslavia	4 – 1	Italy

- October 13, 1959

Lebanon	1 – 18	United Arab Republic

- October 14, 1959

Italy	21 – 0	Lebanon
Yugoslavia	6 – 1	United Arab Republic

- October 15, 1959

Lebanon	1 – 29	Yugoslavia
Italy	9 – 2	United Arab Republic

== Standings ==
Rank	Team
1st place, gold medalist(s)	Yugoslavia
2nd place, silver medalist(s)	Italy
3rd place, bronze medalist(s)	United Arab Republic
4	Lebanon
