= Water polo at the 1951 Mediterranean Games =

- Dates: 14 – 19 October 1951

The water polo event at the 1951 Mediterranean Games was held in Alexandria, Greece. Water polo was one of the thirteen sports during the inaugural Games. Only men's teams participated in the water polo tournament.

== Medalists ==
Event	Gold	Silver	Bronze
Men's Competition	Spain	Egypt	Greece

== Group matches ==
	Team	Points	G	W	D	L	GF	GA	Diff
1.	Spain	7	4	3	1	0	21	6	+15
2.	Egypt	5	4	2	1	1	15	8	+7
3.	Greece	0	4	0	0	4	6	28	–22

- October 14, 1951

Egypt	2 – 4	Spain

- October 15, 1951

Greece	2 – 6	Egypt

- October 16, 1951

Spain	10 – 3	Greece

- October 17, 1951

Egypt	6 – 1	Greece

- October 18, 1951

Greece	0 – 6	Spain

- October 19, 1951

Spain	1 – 1	Egypt

== Standings ==
Rank	Team
1st place, gold medalist(s)	Spain
2nd place, silver medalist(s)	Egypt
3rd place, bronze medalist(s)	Greece
