= Spain men's national water polo team =

Men's national water polo team representing Spain

Spain
- FINA code: ESP
- Association: Royal Spanish Swimming Federation
- Confederation: LEN (Europe)
- Head coach: David Martín
- Asst coach: Svilen Piralkov; Miloš Šćepanović
- Captain: Alberto Munárriz

Olympic Games (team statistics)
- Appearances: 19 (first in 1920)
- Best result: (gold) (1996)

World Championship
- Appearances: 21 (first in 1973)
- Best result: (gold) (1998, 2001, 2022, 2025)

World Cup
- Appearances: 15 (first in 1981)
- Best result: (gold) (2023, 2025)

World League
- Appearances: 17 (first in 2002)
- Best result: (silver) (2002, 2006, 2012)

European Championship
- Appearances: 31 (first in 1927)
- Best result: (gold) (2024)

Mediterranean Games
- Appearances: 18 (first in 1951)
- Best result: (gold) (1951, 2001, 2005)

Media
- Website: rfen.es
Medal record
Men's water polo
Olympic Games
| Gold medal – first place | 1996 Atlanta | Team |
| Silver medal – second place | 1992 Barcelona | Team |
World Championship
| Gold medal – first place | 1998 Perth | Team |
| Gold medal – first place | 2001 Fukuoka | Team |
| Gold medal – first place | 2022 Budapest | Team |
| Gold medal – first place | 2025 Singapore | Team |
| Silver medal – second place | 1991 Perth | Team |
| Silver medal – second place | 1994 Rome | Team |
| Silver medal – second place | 2009 Rome | Team |
| Silver medal – second place | 2019 Gwangju | Team |
| Bronze medal – third place | 2007 Melbourne | Team |
| Bronze medal – third place | 2023 Fukuoka | Team |
| Bronze medal – third place | 2024 Doha | Team |
World Cup
| Gold medal – first place | 2023 Los Angeles |
| Bronze medal – third place | 1985 Duisburg |
| Bronze medal – third place | 1991 Barcelona |
| Bronze medal – third place | 1999 Perth |
| Bronze medal – third place | 2006 Budapest |
| Bronze medal – third place | 2010 Oradea |
World League
| Silver medal – second place | 2002 Patras |
| Silver medal – second place | 2006 Athens |
| Silver medal – second place | 2012 Almaty |
| Bronze medal – third place | 2018 Budapest |
| Bronze medal – third place | 2022 Strasbourg |
European Championship
| Gold medal – first place | 2024 Zagreb |
| Silver medal – second place | 1991 Athens |
| Silver medal – second place | 2018 Barcelona |
| Silver medal – second place | 2020 Budapest |
| Bronze medal – third place | 1983 Rome |
| Bronze medal – third place | 1993 Sheffield |
| Bronze medal – third place | 2006 Belgrade |
| Bronze medal – third place | 2022 Split |
Mediterranean Games
| Gold medal – first place | 2001 Tunis | Team |
| Gold medal – first place | 2005 Almeria | Team |
| Silver medal – second place | 1983 Casablanca | Team |
| Silver medal – second place | 1987 Latakia | Team |
| Silver medal – second place | 2009 Pescara | Team |
| Silver medal – second place | 2013 Mersin | Team |
| Bronze medal – third place | 1955 Barcelona | Team |
| Bronze medal – third place | 1967 Tunis | Team |
| Bronze medal – third place | 1971 Izmir | Team |
| Bronze medal – third place | 1975 Algiers | Team |
| Bronze medal – third place | 1979 Split | Team |
| Bronze medal – third place | 1997 Bari | Team |
| Bronze medal – third place | 2022 Oran | Team |

The Spain men's national water polo team (Spanish: Selección Española de Waterpolo) represents Spain in men's international water polo competitions and it is controlled by Real Federación Española de Natación.

Spain got the «Triple Crown», they are Olympic (1996), World (1998, 2001, 2022, 2025) and European (2024) champions. They also have won medals in the main international competitions: two Olympic, eleven World Championships, eight European Championships, seven World Cup and five World League medals, making them one of the most successful men's water polo teams in the world.

== Results ==
=== Olympic Games ===
| Year | Position |
|---|---|
| (Belgium) 1920 | 7th |
| (France) 1924 | 10th |
| (Netherlands) 1928 | 9th |
| (United Kingdom) 1948 | 8th |
| (Finland) 1952 | 8th |
| (Mexico) 1968 | 9th |
| (West Germany) 1972 | 10th |
| (Soviet Union) 1980 | 4th |
| (United States) 1984 | 4th |
| (South Korea) 1988 | 6th |
| (Spain) 1992 | 2nd place, silver medalist(s) |
| (United States) 1996 | 1st place, gold medalist(s) |
| (Australia) 2000 | 4th |
| (Greece) 2004 | 6th |
| (China) 2008 | 5th |
| (United Kingdom) 2012 | 6th |
| (Brazil) 2016 | 7th |
| (Japan) 2020 | 4th |
| (France) 2024 | 6th |
| Total | 19/28 |

=== World Championship ===
| Year | Position |
|---|---|
| (Socialist Federal Republic of Yugoslavia) 1973 | 10th |
| (Colombia) 1975 | 10th |
| (West Germany) 1978 | 11th |
| (Ecuador) 1982 | 8th |
| (Spain) 1986 | 5th |
| (Australia) 1991 | 2nd place, silver medalist(s) |
| (Italy) 1994 | 2nd place, silver medalist(s) |
| (Australia) 1998 | 1st place, gold medalist(s) |
| (Japan) 2001 | 1st place, gold medalist(s) |
| (Spain) 2003 | 5th |
| (Canada) 2005 | 5th |
| (Australia) 2007 | 3rd place, bronze medalist(s) |
| (Italy) 2009 | 2nd place, silver medalist(s) |
| (China) 2011 | 5th |
| (Spain) 2013 | 5th |
| (Russia) 2015 | DNQ |
| (Hungary) 2017 | 9th |
| (South Korea) 2019 | 2nd place, silver medalist(s) |
| (Hungary) 2022 | 1st place, gold medalist(s) |
| (Japan) 2023 | 3rd place, bronze medalist(s) |
| (Qatar) 2024 | 3rd place, bronze medalist(s) |
| (Singapore) 2025 | 1st place, gold medalist(s) |
| Total | 21/22 |

=== European Championship ===
| Year | Position |
|---|---|
| (Italy) 1927 | 10th |
| (Germany) 1934 | 7th |
| (Italy) 1954 | 7th |
| (Hungary) 1958 | 12th |
| (Netherlands) 1966 | 12th |
| (Spain) 1970 | 8th |
| (Austria) 1974 | 7th |
| (Sweden) 1977 | 8th |
| (Socialist Federal Republic of Yugoslavia) 1981 | 5th |
| (Italy) 1983 | 3rd place, bronze medalist(s) |
| (Bulgaria) 1985 | 6th |
| (France) 1987 | 6th |
| (West Germany) 1989 | 6th |
| (Greece) 1991 | 2nd place, silver medalist(s) |
| (United Kingdom) 1993 | 3rd place, bronze medalist(s) |
| (Austria) 1995 | 5th |
| (Spain) 1997 | 5th |
| (Italy) 1999 | 6th |
| (Hungary) 2001 | 6th |
| (Slovenia) 2003 | 5th |
| (Serbia) 2006 | 3rd place, bronze medalist(s) |
| (Spain) 2008 | 7th |
| (Croatia) 2010 | 8th |
| (Netherlands) 2012 | 7th |
| (Hungary) 2014 | 7th |
| (Serbia) 2016 | 5th |
| (Spain) 2018 | 2nd place, silver medalist(s) |
| (Hungary) 2020 | 2nd place, silver medalist(s) |
| (Croatia) 2022 | 3rd place, bronze medalist(s) |
| (Croatia) 2024 | 1st place, gold medalist(s) |
| (Serbia) 2026 | 5th |
| Total | 31/37 |

=== World Cup ===
| Year | Position |
|---|---|
| (Socialist Federal Republic of Yugoslavia) 1979 | DNQ |
| (United States) 1981 | 5th |
| (United States) 1983 | 5th |
| (West Germany) 1985 | 3rd place, bronze medalist(s) |
| (Greece) 1987 | 6th |
| (West Germany) 1989 | 4th |
| (Spain) 1991 | 3rd place, bronze medalist(s) |
| (Greece) 1993 | DNQ |
| (United States) 1995 | 5th |
| (Greece) 1997 | 6th |
| (Australia) 1999 | 3rd place, bronze medalist(s) |
| (Serbia and Montenegro) 2002 | 6th |
| (Hungary) 2006 | 3rd place, bronze medalist(s) |
| (Romania) 2010 | 3rd place, bronze medalist(s) |
| (Kazakhstan) 2014 | DNQ |
| (Germany) 2018 | DNQ |
| (United States) 2023 | 1st place, gold medalist(s) |
| (Montenegro) 2025 | 1st place, gold medalist(s) |
| (Australia) 2026 | 5th |
| Total | 15/19 |

=== World League ===
| Year | Position |
|---|---|
| (Greece) 2002 | 2nd place, silver medalist(s) |
| (United States) 2003 | DNQ |
| (United States) 2004 | 5th |
| (Serbia and Montenegro) 2005 | 8th |
| (Greece) 2006 | 2nd place, silver medalist(s) |
| (Germany) 2007 | Preliminary round |
| (Italy) 2008 | 5th |
| (Montenegro) 2009 | 10th |
| (Serbia) 2010 | 6th |
| (Italy) 2011 | 11th |
| (Kazakhstan) 2012 | 2nd place, silver medalist(s) |
| (Russia) 2013 | Preliminary round |
| (United Arab Emirates) 2014 | DNQ |
| (Italy) 2015 | Preliminary round |
| (China) 2016 | Preliminary round |
| (Russia) 2017 | DNQ |
| (Hungary) 2018 | 3rd place, bronze medalist(s) |
| (Serbia) 2019 | 4th |
| (Georgia (country)) 2020 | Preliminary round |
| (France) 2022 | 3rd place, bronze medalist(s) |
| Total | 17/20 |

=== Mediterranean Games ===
| Year | Position |
|---|---|
| (Egypt) 1951 | 1st place, gold medalist(s) |
| (Spain) 1955 | 3rd place, bronze medalist(s) |
| (Lebanon) 1967 | 3rd place, bronze medalist(s) |
| (Turkey) 1971 | 3rd place, bronze medalist(s) |
| (Algeria) 1975 | 3rd place, bronze medalist(s) |
| (Socialist Federal Republic of Yugoslavia) 1979 | 3rd place, bronze medalist(s) |
| (Morocco) 1983 | 2nd place, silver medalist(s) |
| (Syria) 1987 | 2nd place, silver medalist(s) |
| (Greece) 1991 | 5th |
| (France) 1993 | 4th |
| (Italy) 1997 | 3rd place, bronze medalist(s) |
| (Tunisia) 2001 | 1st place, gold medalist(s) |
| (Spain) 2005 | 1st place, gold medalist(s) |
| (Italy) 2009 | 2nd place, silver medalist(s) |
| (Turkey) 2013 | 2nd place, silver medalist(s) |
| (Spain) 2018 | 4th |
| (Algeria) 2022 | 3rd place, bronze medalist(s) |
| (Italy) 2026 | 4th |
| Total | 18/20 |

== Current squad ==
Roster for the 2026 Men's European Water Polo Championship.

Head coach: David Martín

| Name | Date of birth | Pos. | Club |
|---|---|---|---|
| Unai Aguirre | 14 July 2002 (age 24) | GK | (Spain) CN Atlètic-Barceloneta |
| Alberto Munárriz (C) | 19 May 1994 (age 32) | DF | (Spain) CN Atlètic-Barceloneta |
| Álvaro Granados | 8 October 1998 (age 28) | W | (Italy) Pro Recco |
| Bernat Sanahuja | 21 October 2000 (age 26) | DF | (Spain) CN Atlètic-Barceloneta |
| Miguel de Toro | 16 August 1993 (age 33) | CF | (Hungary) FTC-Telekom |
| Marc Larumbe | 30 May 1994 (age 32) | W | (France) CN Marseille |
| Pol Daura | 3 October 2002 (age 24) | DF | (Spain) CN Barcelona |
| Sergi Cabañas | 10 February 1996 (age 30) | W | (Spain) CN Sabadell |
| Roger Tahull | 11 May 1997 (age 29) | CF | (Spain) CN Atlètic-Barceloneta |
| Fran Valera | 21 March 1999 (age 27) | W | (Montenegro) Jadran m:tel Herceg Novi |
| Unai Biel | 19 November 2002 (age 23) | W | (Spain) CN Atlètic-Barceloneta |
| Alejandro Bustos | 17 March 1997 (age 29) | DF | (Spain) CN Atlètic-Barceloneta |
| Eduardo Lorrio | 25 September 1993 (age 33) | GK | (Spain) CN Sabadell |
| Oscar Asensio | 2 February 2001 (age 25) | CF | (Spain) CN Sabadell |
| Biel Gomila | 24 February 2006 (age 20) | DF | (Spain) CN Atlètic-Barceloneta |

== Youth teams ==
=== U-20 ===
- World Aquatics U20 Championships

- Winner (4): 1983, 1987, 1991, 2025
- Runner-up (2): 1993, 2011
- Third place (1): 2005

=== U-18 ===
- World Aquatics U18 Championships

- Runner-up (2): 2014, 2018
- Third place (1): 2022

=== U-16 ===
- World Aquatics U16 Championships

- Winner (1): 2024

=== U-19 ===
- European Aquatics U19 Championships

- Winner (1): 1980
- Runner-up (6): 1970, 1971, 1975, 1992, 2008, 2022
- Third place (8): 1973, 1976, 1984, 1994, 2006, 2016, 2018, 2024

=== U-18 ===
- European Aquatics U17/18 Championships

- Runner-up (3): 2015, 2017, 2019
- Third place (4): 1985, 1995, 2011, 2023

=== U-16 ===
- European Aquatics U15/16 Championships

- Runner-up (1): 2021

== See also ==
- Spain men's Olympic water polo team records and statistics
- Spain women's national water polo team
- Royal Spanish Swimming Federation
- List of Olympic champions in men's water polo
- List of men's Olympic water polo tournament records and statistics
- List of world champions in men's water polo
