= France men's national water polo team =

Men's national water polo team representing France

France
- FINA code: FRA
- Association: French Swimming Federation
- Confederation: LEN (Europe)
- Head coach: Vjekoslav Kobešćak
- Asst coach: Olivier Chandieu; Mathias Mercadal
- Captain: Thomas Vernoux

FINA ranking (since 2008)
- Current: 11 (as of 9 August 2021)
- Highest: 8 (2016)

Olympic Games (team statistics)
- Appearances: 12 (first in 1900)
- Best result: (gold) (1924)

World Championship
- Appearances: 6 (first in 1982)
- Best result: TBD (2024)

World League
- Appearances: 9 (first in 2006)
- Best result: 4th (2022)

European Championship
- Appearances: 20 (first in 1927)
- Best result: (silver) (1927)

Media
- Website: ffnatation.fr

The France men's national water polo team is the representative for France in international men's water polo.

== Results ==
=== Olympic Games ===
- 1900 – (bronze) Bronze medal *2
- 1912 – 6th place
- 1920 – 9th place
- 1924 – (gold) Gold medal
- 1928 – (bronze) Bronze medal
- 1936 – 4th place
- 1948 – 6th place
- 1960 – Second round
- 1988 – 10th place
- 1992 – 11th place
- 2016 – 11th place
- 2024 – 10th place

=== World Championship ===
- 1982 – 13th place
- 1986 – 8th place
- 1991 – 12th place
- 2017 – 14th place
- 2023 – 6th place
- 2024 – 4th place

=== FINA World League ===
- 2006 – 6th place
- 2020 – 7th place
- 2022 – 4th place

=== European Championship ===
- 1927 – (silver) Silver medal
- 1931 – 6th place
- 1934 – 6th place
- 1938 – 6th place
- 1947 – 7th place
- 1950 – 6th place
- 1954 – 9th place
- 1958 – 8th place
- 1966 – 13th place
- 1970 – 11th place
- 1989 – 12th place
- 1991 – 11th place
- 2001 – 12th place
- 2014 – 10th place
- 2016 – 9th place
- 2018 – 12th place
- 2020 – 13th place
- 2022 – 6th place
- 2024 – 9th place
- 2026 – 9th place

=== Mediterranean Games ===
- 2022 – 7th place
- 2026 – 5th place

== Team ==
=== Current squad ===
Roster for the 2026 Men's European Water Polo Championship.

Head coach: (Croatia) Vjekoslav Kobešćak

Name	Date of birth	Pos.	Club
Julien Offner	16 December 1999 (age 26)	GK	(France) USB Bordeaux
Kilian Braise Fernandez	4 July 2007 (age 19)	W	(France) Pays d'Aix Natation
Luca Barnat	8 February 2007 (age 19)	CF	(France) AS Monaco Natation
Alexandre Bouet	5 December 2000 (age 25)	W	(France) CN Marseille
Alexis Drahe	15 December 2003 (age 22)	DF	(France) Pays d'Aix Natation
Thomas Vernoux (C)	21 March 2002 (age 24)	W	(France) CN Marseille
Steven Vitrant	27 October 1997 (age 28)	W	(France) Team Strasbourg
Denis Guerin	8 January 2002 (age 24)	DF	(France) Taverny SN 95
Romain Marion-Vernoux	2 January 2000 (age 26)	W	(France) CN Marseille
Lorris Canovas	7 February 2001 (age 25)	W	(France) Team Strasbourg
Enzo Nardon	6 January 2003 (age 23)	W	(France) Taverny SN 95
Jean-Baptiste Carpentras	12 April 2002 (age 24)	DF	(France) Olympic Nice Natation
Hugo Fontani	22 December 1994 (age 31)	GK	(France) Team Strasbourg
Mathis Mas	13 May 2004 (age 22)	CF	(France) Team Strasbourg
Tom Sauton	4 October 2002 (age 23)	W	(France) Sete Natation

=== Notable players ===
- Michaël Bodegas (intermission Italy)
- Ugo Crousillat (intermission Montenegro)
- Frédéric Audon
- Pierre Garsau
- Michel Idoux
- Armand Mikaelian

== See also ==
- France men's Olympic water polo team records and statistics
- List of Olympic champions in men's water polo
- List of men's Olympic water polo tournament records and statistics
