= List of water polo world medalists =

This article contains lists of those nations that have won a water polo world medal, referring to any of the men's and women's tournament at the Olympic Games, men's and women's tournament at the FINA World Aquatics Championships, men's and women's FINA Water Polo World Cup, and men's and women's FINA Water Polo World League.

== Men's water polo world medalists ==
For the making of these lists, results from following world tournaments are consulted:

Governing body	Tournament	Abbr.	Edition			Ref.
Governing body	Tournament	Abbr.	First	Latest	Next	Ref.
FINA & IOC	Men's water polo tournament at the Summer Olympics	OG	1900	2020	2024	
FINA	Men's water polo tournament at the World Aquatics Championships	WCH	1973	2019	2022	
FINA	FINA Men's Water Polo World Cup	WCp	1979	2018	TBD	
FINA	FINA Men's Water Polo World League	WL	2002	2020	2022	

- FINA: Fédération internationale de natation
- IOC: International Olympic Committee

Medals for the unofficial events are NOT counted. Medals earned by athletes from defunct National Olympic Committees (NOCs) or historical teams are NOT merged with the results achieved by their immediate successor states. The International Olympic Committee (IOC) does NOT combine medals of these nations or teams.

=== 1900–2001 ===
Legend

- Team – Winning three or more gold medals in a row, excluding the FINA World League
- Team^{†} – Defunct team

Tournament	Host	Gold	Silver	Bronze
1900 OG	Paris, France	Great Britain	Belgium	France (Note: France had four teams compete in 1900. Bronze medals were given to the losers of both semifinals; France took both bronze.)
1904 OG	St. Louis, United States	Water polo was an unofficial sport		
1908 OG	London, United Kingdom	Great Britain	Belgium	Sweden
1912 OG	Stockholm, Sweden	Great Britain	Sweden	Belgium
1920 OG	Antwerp, Belgium	Great Britain	Belgium	Sweden
1924 OG	Paris, France	France	Belgium	United States
1928 OG	Amsterdam, Netherlands	Germany	Hungary	France
1932 OG	Los Angeles, United States	Hungary	Germany	United States
1936 OG	Berlin, Germany	Hungary	Germany	Belgium
1948 OG	London, United Kingdom	Italy	Hungary	Netherlands
1952 OG	Helsinki, Finland	Hungary	Yugoslavia^{†}	Italy
1956 OG	Melbourne, Australia	Hungary	Yugoslavia^{†}	Soviet Union^{†}
1960 OG	Rome, Italy	Italy	Soviet Union^{†}	Hungary
1964 OG	Tokyo, Japan	Hungary	Yugoslavia^{†}	Soviet Union^{†}
1968 OG	Mexico City, Mexico	Yugoslavia^{†}	Soviet Union^{†}	Hungary
1972 OG	Munich, West Germany	Soviet Union^{†}	Hungary	United States
1973 WCH	(Socialist Federal Republic of Yugoslavia); Belgrade, Yugoslavia	Hungary	Soviet Union^{†}	Yugoslavia^{†}
1975 WCH	Cali, Colombia	Soviet Union^{†}	Hungary	Italy
1976 OG	Montreal, Canada	Hungary	Italy	Netherlands
1978 WCH	West Berlin, West Germany	Italy	Hungary	Yugoslavia^{†}
1979 WCp	(Socialist Federal Republic of Yugoslavia); Belgrade & Rijeka, Yugoslavia	Hungary	United States	Yugoslavia^{†}
1980 OG	Moscow, Soviet Union	Soviet Union^{†}	Yugoslavia^{†}	Hungary
1981 WCp	Long Beach, United States	Soviet Union^{†}	Yugoslavia^{†}	Cuba
1982 WCH	Guayaquil, Ecuador	Soviet Union^{†}	Hungary	West Germany^{†}
1983 WCp	Malibu, United States	Soviet Union^{†}	West Germany^{†}	Italy
1984 OG	Los Angeles, United States	Yugoslavia^{†}	United States	West Germany^{†}
1985 WCp	Duisburg, West Germany	West Germany^{†}	United States	Spain
1986 WCH	Madrid, Spain	Yugoslavia^{†}	Italy	Soviet Union^{†}
1987 WCp	Thessaloniki, Greece	Yugoslavia^{†}	Soviet Union^{†}	West Germany^{†}
1988 OG	Seoul, South Korea	Yugoslavia^{†}	United States	Soviet Union^{†}
1989 WCp	West Berlin, West Germany	Yugoslavia^{†}	Italy	Hungary
1991 WCH	Perth, Australia	Yugoslavia^{†}	Spain	Hungary
1991 WCp	Barcelona, Spain	United States	Yugoslavia^{†}	Spain
1992 OG	Barcelona, Spain	Italy	Spain	(International Olympic Committee); Unified Team^{†} (Note: In 1992, 12 of the 15 former Soviet Republics competed together as the Unified Team and marched under the Olympic Flag in the Barcelona Games.)
1993 WCp	Athens, Greece	Italy	Hungary	Australia
1994 WCH	Rome, Italy	Italy	Spain	Russia
1995 WCp	Atlanta, United States	Hungary	Italy	Russia
1996 OG	Atlanta, United States	Spain	Croatia	Italy
1997 WCp	Athens, Greece	United States	Greece	Hungary
1998 WCH	Perth, Australia	Spain	Hungary	Yugoslavia^{†} (Note: After the breakup of Yugoslavia, FR Yugoslavia men's national water polo team participated in two Olympic Games, two World Aquatics Championships, and three FINA World Cups. In 2003, after the country was renamed from FR Yugoslavia to Serbia and Montenegro, the team was also renamed to "Serbia and Montenegro men's national water polo team".)
1999 WCp	Sydney, Australia	Hungary	Italy	Spain
2000 OG	Sydney, Australia	Hungary	Russia	Yugoslavia^{†}
2001 WCH	Fukuoka, Japan	Spain	Yugoslavia^{†}	Russia

=== 2002–present ===
Legend

- Team – Winning three or more gold medals in a row, excluding the FINA World League
- Team – Winning five or more gold medals in a row, including the FINA World League
- Team^{†} – Defunct team

Tournament	Host	Gold	Silver	Bronze	Tournament	Host	Gold	Silver	Bronze
2002 WL	Patras, Greece	Russia	Spain	Hungary	2002 WCp	(Federal Republic of Yugoslavia); Belgrade, FR Yugoslavia	Russia	Hungary	Yugoslavia^{†}
2003 WL	New York, United States	Hungary	Italy	United States	2003 WCH	Barcelona, Spain	Hungary	Italy	Serbia and Montenegro^{†}
2004 WL	Long Beach, United States	Hungary	Serbia and Montenegro^{†}	Greece	2004 OG	Athens, Greece	Hungary	Serbia and Montenegro^{†}	Russia
2005 WL	Belgrade, Serbia and Montenegro	Serbia and Montenegro^{†}	Hungary	Germany	2005 WCH	Montreal, Canada	Serbia and Montenegro^{†}	Hungary	Greece
2006 WL	Athens, Greece	Serbia and Montenegro^{†}	Spain	Greece	2006 WCp	Budapest, Hungary	Serbia and Montenegro^{†}	Hungary	Spain
2007 WL	Berlin, Germany	Serbia	Hungary	Australia	2007 WCH	Melbourne, Australia	Croatia	Hungary	Spain
2008 WL	Genoa, Italy	Serbia	United States	Australia	2008 OG	Beijing, China	Hungary	United States	Serbia
2009 WL	Podgorica, Montenegro	Montenegro	Croatia	Serbia	2009 WCH	Rome, Italy	Serbia	Spain	Croatia
2010 WL	Niš, Serbia	Serbia	Montenegro	Croatia	2010 WCp	Oradea, Romania	Serbia	Croatia	Spain
2011 WL	Florence, Italy	Serbia	Italy	Croatia	2011 WCH	Shanghai, China	Italy	Serbia	Croatia
2012 WL	Almaty, Kazakhstan	Croatia	Spain	Italy	2012 OG	London, United Kingdom	Croatia	Italy	Serbia
2013 WL	Chelyabinsk, Russia	Serbia	Hungary	Montenegro	2013 WCH	Barcelona, Spain	Hungary	Montenegro	Croatia
2014 WL	Dubai, United Arab Emirates	Serbia	Hungary	Montenegro	2014 WCp	Almaty, Kazakhstan	Serbia	Hungary	Croatia
2015 WL	Bergamo, Italy	Serbia	Croatia	Brazil	2015 WCH	Kazan, Russia	Serbia	Croatia	Greece
2016 WL	Huizhou, China	Serbia	United States	Greece	2016 OG	Rio de Janeiro, Brazil	Serbia	Croatia	Italy
2017 WL	Ruza, Russia	Serbia	Italy	Croatia	2017 WCH	Budapest, Hungary	Croatia	Hungary	Serbia
2018 WL	Budapest, Hungary	Montenegro	Hungary	Spain	2018 WCp	Berlin, Germany	Hungary	Australia	Serbia
2019 WL	Belgrade, Serbia	Serbia	Croatia	Australia	2019 WCH	Gwangju, South Korea	Italy	Spain	Croatia
2020 WL	(Georgia (country)); Tbilisi, Georgia	Montenegro	United States	Greece	2020 OG	Tokyo, Japan	Serbia	Greece	Hungary

=== Team statistics ===
==== World medals by team ====
Last updated: 9 August 2021 (after the 2020 Summer Olympics).

Legend

- Team^{†} – Defunct team

Men's team	OG			WCH			WCp			WL		
Men's team	G	S	B	G	S	B	G	S	B	G	S	B
Australia (AUS)	0	0	0	0	0	0	0	1	1	0	0	3
Belgium (BEL)	0	4	2	0	0	0	0	0	0	0	0	0
Brazil (BRA)	0	0	0	0	0	0	0	0	0	0	0	1
Croatia (CRO)	1	2	0	2	1	4	0	1	1	1	3	3
Cuba (CUB)	0	0	0	0	0	0	0	0	1	0	0	0
France (FRA)	1	0	3	0	0	0	0	0	0	0	0	0
Germany (GER)	1	2	0	0	0	0	0	0	0	0	0	1
Great Britain (GBR)	4	0	0	0	0	0	0	0	0	0	0	0
Greece (GRE)	0	1	0	0	0	2	0	1	0	0	0	4
Hungary (HUN)	9	3	4	3	7	1	4	4	2	2	5	1
Italy (ITA)	3	2	3	4	2	1	1	3	1	0	3	1
Montenegro (MNE)	0	0	0	0	1	0	0	0	0	3	1	2
Men's team	OG			WCH			WCp			WL		
Men's team	G	S	B	G	S	B	G	S	B	G	S	B
Netherlands (NED)	0	0	2	0	0	0	0	0	0	0	0	0
Russia (RUS)	0	1	1	0	0	2	1	0	1	1	0	0
Serbia (SRB)	2	0	2	2	1	1	2	0	1	10	0	1
Serbia and Montenegro (SCG)^{†}	0	1	0	1	0	1	1	0	0	2	1	0
Soviet Union (URS)^{†}	2	2	3	2	1	1	2	1	0	0	0	0
Spain (ESP)	1	1	0	2	4	1	0	0	5	0	3	1
Sweden (SWE)	0	1	2	0	0	0	0	0	0	0	0	0
Unified Team^{†}	0	0	1	0	0	0	0	0	0	0	0	0
United States (USA)	0	3	3	0	0	0	2	2	0	0	3	1
West Germany (FRG)^{†}	0	0	1	0	0	1	1	1	1	0	0	0
Yugoslavia (YUG)^{†}	3	4	0	2	0	2	2	2	1	0	0	0
Yugoslavia (FRY)^{†}	0	0	1	0	1	1	0	0	1	0	0	0
Totals (24 men's teams)	27	27	28	18	18	18	16	16	16	19	19	19

==== Medal table by team ====
The following tables are pre-sorted by number of gold medals (in descending order), number of silver medals (in descending order), number of bronze medals (in descending order), name of the team (in ascending order), respectively. Last updated: 9 August 2021 (after the 2020 Summer Olympics).

Legend

- Team^{†} – Defunct team

Medal table (excluding the FINA World League)
Rank	Men's team	Gold	Silver	Bronze	Total
1	Hungary (HUN)	16	14	7	37
2	Italy (ITA)	8	7	5	20
3	Yugoslavia (YUG)^{†}	7	6	3	16
4	Soviet Union (URS)^{†}	6	4	4	14
5	Serbia (SRB)	6	1	4	11
6	Great Britain (GBR)	4	0	0	4
7	Spain (ESP)	3	5	6	14
8	Croatia (CRO)	3	4	5	12
9	United States (USA)	2	5	3	10
10	Serbia and Montenegro (SCG)^{†}	2	1	1	4
11	Germany (GER)	1	2	0	3
12	Russia (RUS)	1	1	4	6
13	West Germany (FRG)^{†}	1	1	3	5
14	France (FRA)	1	0	3	4
15	Belgium (BEL)	0	4	2	6
16	Greece (GRE)	0	2	2	4
17	Yugoslavia (FRY)^{†}	0	1	3	4
18	Sweden (SWE)	0	1	2	3
19	Australia (AUS)	0	1	1	2
20	Montenegro (MNE)	0	1	0	1
21	Netherlands (NED)	0	0	2	2
22	Cuba (CUB)	0	0	1	1
22	Unified Team^{†}	0	0	1	1
Totals (23 entries)		61	61	62	184

Medal table (including the FINA World League)
Rank	Men's team	Gold	Silver	Bronze	Total
1	Hungary (HUN)	18	19	8	45
2	Serbia (SRB)	16	1	5	22
3	Italy (ITA)	8	10	6	24
4	Yugoslavia (YUG)^{†}	7	6	3	16
5	Soviet Union (URS)^{†}	6	4	4	14
6	Croatia (CRO)	4	7	8	19
7	Serbia and Montenegro (SCG)^{†}	4	2	1	7
8	Great Britain (GBR)	4	0	0	4
9	Spain (ESP)	3	8	7	18
10	Montenegro (MNE)	3	2	2	7
11	United States (USA)	2	8	4	14
12	Russia (RUS)	2	1	4	7
13	Germany (GER)	1	2	1	4
14	West Germany (FRG)^{†}	1	1	3	5
15	France (FRA)	1	0	3	4
16	Belgium (BEL)	0	4	2	6
17	Greece (GRE)	0	2	6	8
18	Australia (AUS)	0	1	4	5
19	Yugoslavia (FRY)^{†}	0	1	3	4
20	Sweden (SWE)	0	1	2	3
21	Netherlands (NED)	0	0	2	2
22	Brazil (BRA)	0	0	1	1
22	Cuba (CUB)	0	0	1	1
22	Unified Team^{†}	0	0	1	1
Totals (24 entries)		80	80	81	241

==== National teams by decade ====
The following tables are pre-sorted by decade (in ascending order), total number of medals (in descending order), number of gold medals (in descending order), number of silver medals (in descending order), three-letter country code (in ascending order), respectively. Last updated: 9 August 2021 (after the 2020 Summer Olympics).

Legend

- Team^{†} – Defunct team

Men's national teams by decade (excluding the FINA World League)
Rank	1	2	3	4	5	6	7	8	9	10
1900s	GBR; 2 G/0 S/0 B Totals: 2	BEL; 0 G/2 S/0 B Totals: 2	FRA; 0 G/0 S/2 B Totals: 2	SWE; 0 G/0 S/1 B Totals: 1	—	—	—	—	—	—
1910s	GBR; 1 G/0 S/0 B Totals: 1	SWE; 0 G/1 S/0 B Totals: 1	BEL; 0 G/0 S/1 B Totals: 1	—	—	—	—	—	—	—
1920s	FRA; 1 G/0 S/1 B Totals: 2	BEL; 0 G/2 S/0 B Totals: 2	GBR; GER; 1 G/0 S/0 B Totals: 1	—	HUN; 0 G/1 S/0 B Totals: 1	SWE; USA; 0 G/0 S/1 B Totals: 1	—	—	—	—
1930s	HUN; 2 G/0 S/0 B Totals: 2	GER; 0 G/2 S/0 B Totals: 2	BEL; USA; 0 G/0 S/1 B Totals: 1	—	—	—	—	—	—	—
1940s	ITA; 1 G/0 S/0 B Totals: 1	HUN; 0 G/1 S/0 B Totals: 1	NED; 0 G/0 S/1 B Totals: 1	—	—	—	—	—	—	—
1950s	HUN; 2 G/0 S/0 B Totals: 2	YUG^{†} 0 G/2 S/0 B Totals: 2	ITA; URS^{†} 0 G/0 S/1 B Totals: 1	—	—	—	—	—	—	—
Rank	1	2	3	4	5	6	7	8	9	10
1960s	HUN; 1 G/0 S/2 B Totals: 3	URS^{†} 0 G/2 S/1 B Totals: 3	YUG^{†} 1 G/1 S/0 B Totals: 2	ITA; 1 G/0 S/0 B Totals: 1	—	—	—	—	—	—
1970s	HUN; 3 G/3 S/0 B Totals: 6	URS^{†} 2 G/1 S/0 B Totals: 3	ITA; 1 G/1 S/1 B Totals: 3	YUG^{†} 0 G/0 S/3 B Totals: 3	USA; 0 G/1 S/1 B Totals: 2	NED; 0 G/0 S/1 B Totals: 1	—	—	—	—
1980s	YUG^{†} 5 G/2 S/0 B Totals: 7	URS^{†} 4 G/1 S/2 B Totals: 7	FRG^{†} 1 G/1 S/3 B Totals: 5	USA; 0 G/3 S/0 B Totals: 3	ITA; 0 G/2 S/1 B Totals: 3	HUN; 0 G/1 S/2 B Totals: 3	CUB; ESP; 0 G/0 S/1 B Totals: 1	—	—	—
1990s	ESP; 2 G/3 S/2 B Totals: 7	ITA; 3 G/2 S/1 B Totals: 6	HUN; 2 G/2 S/2 B Totals: 6	USA; 2 G/0 S/0 B Totals: 2	YUG^{†} 1 G/1 S/0 B Totals: 2	RUS; 0 G/0 S/2 B Totals: 2	CRO; GRE; 0 G/1 S/0 B Totals: 1	—	AUS (International Olympic Committee) EUN^{†} FRY^{†} 0 G/0 S/1 B Totals: 1	—
2000s	HUN; 4 G/4 S/0 B Totals: 8	SCG^{†} 2 G/1 S/1 B Totals: 4	ESP; RUS; 1 G/1 S/2 B Totals: 4	—	FRY^{†} 0 G/1 S/2 B Totals: 3	CRO; SRB; 1 G/0 S/1 B Totals: 2	—	ITA; USA; 0 G/1 S/0 B Totals: 1	—	GRE; 0 G/0 S/1 B Totals: 1
2010s	CRO; 2 G/3 S/4 B Totals: 9	SRB; 4 G/1 S/3 B Totals: 8	HUN; 2 G/2 S/0 B Totals: 4	ITA; 2 G/1 S/1 B Totals: 4	ESP; 0 G/1 S/1 B Totals: 2	AUS; MNE; 0 G/1 S/0 B Totals: 1	—	GRE; 0 G/0 S/1 B Totals: 1	—	—
2020s	SRB; 1 G/0 S/0 B Totals: 1	GRE; 0 G/1 S/0 B Totals: 1	HUN; 0 G/0 S/1 B Totals: 1							
Rank	1	2	3	4	5	6	7	8	9	10

Men's national teams by decade (including the FINA World League)
Rank	1	2	3	4	5	6	7	8	9	10	11	12	13
2000s	HUN; 6 G/6 S/1 B Totals: 13	SCG^{†} 4 G/2 S/1 B Totals: 7	ESP; 1 G/3 S/2 B Totals: 6	SRB; 3 G, 0 S/2 B Totals: 5	RUS; 2 G/1 S/2 B Totals: 5	CRO; 1 G/1 S/1 B Totals: 3	USA; 0 G/2 S/1 B Totals: 3	FRY^{†} 0 G/1 S/2 B Totals: 3	GRE; 0 G/0 S/3 B Totals: 3	ITA; 0 G/2 S/0 B Totals: 2	AUS; 0 G/0 S/2 B Totals: 2	MNE; 1 G/0 S/0 B Totals: 1	GER; 0 G/0 S/1 B Totals: 1
2010s	SRB; 12 G/1 S/3 B Totals: 16	CRO; 3 G/5 S/7 B Totals: 15	HUN; 2 G/5 S/0 B Totals: 7	ITA; 2 G/3 S/2 B Totals: 7	MNE; 1 G/2 S/2 B Totals: 5	ESP; 0 G/2 S/2 B Totals: 4	AUS; 0 G/1 S/1 B Totals: 2	GRE; 0 G/0 S/2 B Totals: 2	USA; 0 G/1 S/0 B Totals: 1	BRA; 0 G/0 S/1 B Totals: 1	—	—	—
2020s	GRE; 0 G/1 S/1 B Totals: 2	MNE; SRB; 1 G/0 S/0 B Totals: 1	USA; 0 G/1 S/0 B Totals: 1	HUN; 0 G/0 S/1 B Totals: 1									

==== Consecutive gold medals ====
Last updated: 9 August 2021 (after the 2020 Summer Olympics).

Legend

- Team^{†} – Defunct team

#	Men's team	Three or more consecutive gold medals (excluding the FINA World League)
1	Great Britain	1908 OG (1), 1912 OG (2), 1920 OG (3)
2	Soviet Union^{†}	1980 OG (1), 1981 WCp (2), 1982 WCH (3), 1983 WCp (4)
3	Yugoslavia^{†}	1986 WCH (1), 1987 WCp (2), 1988 OG (3), 1989 WCp (4), 1991 WCH (5)
4	Italy	1992 OG (1), 1993 WCp (2), 1994 WCH (3)
5	Serbia	2014 WCp (1), 2015 WCH (2), 2016 OG (3)

#	Men's team	Five or more consecutive gold medals (including the FINA World League)
1	Serbia	2014 WL (1), 2014 WCp (2), 2015 WL (3), 2015 WCH (4), 2016 WL (5), 2016 OG (6), 2017 WL (7)

=== Confederation statistics ===
==== National teams by confederation ====
Last updated: 9 August 2021 (after the 2020 Summer Olympics).

Legend

- Team^{†} – Defunct team

Confederation	Africa – CANA	Americas – UANA	Asia – AASF	Europe – LEN	Oceania – OSA
Men's team	None	Brazil; Cuba; United States	None	Belgium; Croatia; France; Germany; Great Britain; Greece; Hungary; Italy; Montenegro; Netherlands; Russia; Serbia; Serbia and Montenegro^{†} Soviet Union^{†} Spain; Sweden (International Olympic Committee) Unified Team^{†} West Germany^{†} Yugoslavia^{†} Yugoslavia^{†}	Australia
Totals (24 teams)	0 teams	3 teams	0 teams	20 teams (including 6 defunct teams)	1 team

==== Medal table by confederation ====
The following tables are pre-sorted by number of gold medals (in descending order), number of silver medals (in descending order), number of bronze medals (in descending order), name of the confederation (in ascending order), respectively. Last updated: 9 August 2021 (after the 2020 Summer Olympics).

Medal table (excluding the FINA World League)
Rank	Confederation	Gold	Silver	Bronze	Total
1	Europe – LEN	59	55	57	171
2	Americas – UANA	2	5	4	11
3	Oceania – OSA	0	1	1	2
4	Asia – AASF	0	0	0	0
4	Africa – CANA	0	0	0	0
Totals (5 entries)		61	61	62	184

Medal table (including the FINA World League)
Rank	Confederation	Gold	Silver	Bronze	Total
1	Europe – LEN	78	71	71	220
2	Americas – UANA	2	8	6	16
3	Oceania – OSA	0	1	4	5
4	Asia – AASF	0	0	0	0
4	Africa – CANA	0	0	0	0
Totals (5 entries)		80	80	81	241

== Women's water polo world medalists ==
For the making of these lists, results from following world tournaments are consulted:

Governing body	Tournament	Abbr.	Edition			Ref.
Governing body	Tournament	Abbr.	First	Latest	Next	Ref.
FINA & IOC	Women's water polo tournament at the Summer Olympics	OG	2000	2020	2024	
FINA	Women's water polo tournament at the World Aquatics Championships	WCH	1986	2019	2022	
FINA	FINA Women's Water Polo World Cup	WCp	1979	2018	TBD	
FINA	FINA Women's Water Polo World League	WL	2004	2020	2022	

- FINA: Fédération internationale de natation
- IOC: International Olympic Committee

Medals for the unofficial events are NOT counted. Medals earned by athletes from defunct National Olympic Committees (NOCs) or historical teams are NOT merged with the results achieved by their immediate successor states. The International Olympic Committee (IOC) does NOT combine medals of these nations or teams.

=== 1979–2003 ===
Legend

- Team – Winning three or more gold medals in a row, excluding the FINA World League

Tournament	Host	Gold	Silver	Bronze
1979 WCp	Merced, United States	United States	Netherlands	Australia
1980 WCp	Breda, Netherlands	Netherlands	United States	Canada
1981 WCp	Brisbane, Australia	Canada	Netherlands	Australia
1983 WCp	Sainte-Foy, Canada	Netherlands	United States	Australia
1984 WCp	Irvine, United States	Australia	United States	Netherlands
1986 WCH	Madrid, Spain	Australia	Netherlands	United States
1988 WCp	Christchurch, New Zealand	Netherlands	Hungary	Canada
1989 WCp	Eindhoven, Netherlands	Netherlands	United States	Hungary
1991 WCH	Perth, Australia	Netherlands	Canada	United States
1991 WCp	Long Beach, United States	Netherlands	Australia	United States
1993 WCp	Catania, Italy	Netherlands	Italy	Hungary
1994 WCH	Rome, Italy	Hungary	Netherlands	Italy
1995 WCp	Sydney, Australia	Australia	Netherlands	Hungary
1997 WCp	Nancy, France	Netherlands	Russia	Australia
1998 WCH	Perth, Australia	Italy	Netherlands	Australia
1999 WCp	Winnipeg, Canada	Netherlands	Australia	Italy
2000 OG	Sydney, Australia	Australia	United States	Russia
2001 WCH	Fukuoka, Japan	Italy	Hungary	Canada
2002 WCp	Perth, Australia	Hungary	United States	Canada
2003 WCH	Barcelona, Spain	United States	Italy	Russia

=== 2004–present ===
Legend

- Team – Winning three or more gold medals in a row, excluding the FINA World League
- Team – Winning five or more gold medals in a row, including the FINA World League

Tournament	Host	Gold	Silver	Bronze	Tournament	Host	Gold	Silver	Bronze
2004 WL	Long Beach, United States	United States	Hungary	Italy	2004 OG	Athens, Greece	Italy	Greece	United States
2005 WL	Kirishi, Russia	Greece	Russia	Australia	2005 WCH	Montreal, Canada	Hungary	United States	Canada
2006 WL	Cosenza, Italy	United States	Italy	Russia	2006 WCp	Tianjin, China	Australia	Italy	Russia
2007 WL	Montreal, Canada	United States	Australia	Greece	2007 WCH	Melbourne, Australia	United States	Australia	Russia
2008 WL	Santa Cruz, Spain	Russia	United States	Australia	2008 OG	Beijing, China	Netherlands	United States	Australia
2009 WL	Kirishi, Russia	United States	Canada	Australia	2009 WCH	Rome, Italy	United States	Canada	Russia
2010 WL	La Jolla, United States	United States	Australia	Greece	2010 WCp	Christchurch, New Zealand	United States	Australia	China
2011 WL	Tianjin, China	United States	Italy	Australia	2011 WCH	Shanghai, China	Greece	China	Russia
2012 WL	Changshu, China	United States	Australia	Greece	2012 OG	London, United Kingdom	United States	Spain	Australia
2013 WL	Beijing, China	China	Russia	United States	2013 WCH	Barcelona, Spain	Spain	Australia	Hungary
2014 WL	Kunshan, China	United States	Italy	Australia	2014 WCp	Khanty-Mansiysk, Russia	United States	Australia	Spain
2015 WL	Shanghai, China	United States	Australia	Netherlands	2015 WCH	Kazan, Russia	United States	Netherlands	Italy
2016 WL	Shanghai, China	United States	Spain	Australia	2016 OG	Rio de Janeiro, Brazil	United States	Italy	Russia
2017 WL	Shanghai, China	United States	Canada	Russia	2017 WCH	Budapest, Hungary	United States	Spain	Russia
2018 WL	Kunshan, China	United States	Netherlands	Russia	2018 WCp	Surgut, Russia	United States	Russia	Australia
2019 WL	Budapest, Hungary	United States	Italy	Russia	2019 WCH	Gwangju, South Korea	United States	Spain	Australia
2020 WL	Athens, Greece	United States	Hungary	Russia	2020 OG	Tokyo, Japan	United States	Spain	Hungary

=== Team statistics ===
==== World medals by team ====
Last updated: 9 August 2021 (after the 2020 Summer Olympics).

Women's team	OG			WCH			WCp			WL		
Women's team	G	S	B	G	S	B	G	S	B	G	S	B
Australia (AUS)	1	0	2	1	2	2	3	4	5	0	4	6
Canada (CAN)	0	0	0	0	2	2	1	0	3	0	2	0
China (CHN)	0	0	0	0	1	0	0	0	1	1	0	0
Greece (GRE)	0	1	0	1	0	0	0	0	0	1	0	3
Hungary (HUN)	0	0	1	2	1	1	1	1	3	0	2	0
Italy (ITA)	1	1	0	2	1	2	0	2	1	0	4	1
Netherlands (NED)	1	0	0	1	4	0	8	3	1	0	1	1
Russia (RUS)	0	0	2	0	0	5	0	2	1	1	2	5
Spain (ESP)	0	2	0	1	2	0	0	0	1	0	1	0
United States (USA)	3	2	1	6	1	2	4	5	1	14	1	1
Totals (10 women's teams)	6	6	6	14	14	14	17	17	17	17	17	17

==== Medal table by team ====
The following tables are pre-sorted by number of gold medals (in descending order), number of silver medals (in descending order), number of bronze medals (in descending order), name of the team (in ascending order), respectively. Last updated: 9 August 2021 (after the 2020 Summer Olympics).

Medal table (excluding the FINA World League)
Rank	Women's team	Gold	Silver	Bronze	Total
1	United States (USA)	13	8	4	25
2	Netherlands (NED)	10	7	1	18
3	Australia (AUS)	5	6	9	20
4	Italy (ITA)	3	4	3	10
5	Hungary (HUN)	3	2	5	10
6	Spain (ESP)	1	4	1	6
7	Canada (CAN)	1	2	5	8
8	Greece (GRE)	1	1	0	2
9	Russia (RUS)	0	2	8	10
10	China (CHN)	0	1	1	2
Totals (10 entries)		37	37	37	111

Medal table (including the FINA World League)
Rank	Women's team	Gold	Silver	Bronze	Total
1	United States (USA)	27	9	5	41
2	Netherlands (NED)	10	8	2	20
3	Australia (AUS)	5	10	15	30
4	Italy (ITA)	3	8	4	15
5	Hungary (HUN)	3	4	5	12
6	Greece (GRE)	2	1	3	6
7	Spain (ESP)	1	5	1	7
8	Russia (RUS)	1	4	13	18
9	Canada (CAN)	1	4	5	10
10	China (CHN)	1	1	1	3
Totals (10 entries)		54	54	54	162

==== National teams by decade ====
The following tables are pre-sorted by decade (in ascending order), total number of medals (in descending order), number of gold medals (in descending order), number of silver medals (in descending order), three-letter country code (in ascending order), respectively.Last updated: 9 August 2021 (after the 2020 Summer Olympics).

Women's national teams by decade (excluding the FINA World League)
Rank	1	2	3	4	5	6	7	8	9
1970s	USA; 1 G/0 S/0 B Totals: 1	NED; 0 G/1 S/0 B Totals: 1	AUS; 0 G/0 S/1 B Totals: 1	—	—	—	—	—	—
1980s	NED; 4 G/2 S/1 B Totals: 7	USA; 0 G/4 S/1 B Totals: 5	AUS; 2 G/0 S/2 B Totals: 4	CAN; 1 G/0 S/2 B Totals: 3	HUN; 0 G/1 S/1 B Totals: 2	—	—	—	—
1990s	NED; 5 G/3 S/0 B Totals: 8	AUS; 1 G/2 S/2 B Totals: 5	ITA; 1 G/1 S/2 B Totals: 4	HUN; 1 G/0 S/2 B Totals: 3	USA; 0 G/0 S/2 B Totals: 2	CAN; RUS; 0 G/1 S/0 B Totals: 1	—	—	—
2000s	USA; 3 G/4 S/1 B Totals: 8	RUS; 0 G/0 S/5 B Totals: 5	AUS; 2 G/1 S/1 B Totals: 4	ITA; 2 G/2 S/0 B Totals: 4	CAN; 0 G/1 S/3 B Totals: 4	HUN; 2 G/1 S/0 B Totals: 3	NED; 1 G/0 S/0 B Totals: 1	GRE; 0 G/1 S/0 B Totals: 1	—
2010s	USA; 8 G/0 S/0 B Totals: 8	AUS; 0 G/3 S/3 B Totals: 6	ESP; 1 G/3 S/1 B Totals: 5	RUS; 0 G/1 S/3 B Totals: 4	CHN; ITA; 0 G/1 S/1 B Totals: 2	—	GRE; 1 G/0 S/0 B Totals: 1	NED; 0 G/1 S/0 B Totals: 1	HUN; 0 G/0 S/1 B Totals: 1
2020s	USA; 1 G/0 S/0 B Totals: 1	ESP; 0 G/1 S/0 B Totals: 1	HUN; 0 G/0 S/1 B Totals: 1						

Women's national teams by decade (including the FINA World League)
Rank	1	2	3	4	5	6	7	8	9	10
2000s	USA; 7 G/5 S/1 B Totals: 13	AUS; 2 G/2 S/4 B Totals: 8	RUS; 1 G/1 S/6 B Totals: 8	ITA; 2 G/3 S/1 B Totals: 6	CAN; 0 G/2 S/3 B Totals: 5	HUN; 2 G/2 S/0 B Totals: 4	GRE; 1 G/1 S/1 B Totals: 3	NED; 1 G/0 S/0 B Totals: 1	—	—
2010s	USA; 17 G/0 S/1 B Totals: 18	AUS; 0 G/6 S/6 B Totals: 12	RUS; 0 G/2 S/6 B Totals: 8	ESP; 1 G/4 S/1 B Totals: 6	ITA; 0 G/4 S/1 B Totals: 5	CHN; 1 G/1 S/1 B Totals: 3	GRE; 1 G/0 S/2 B Totals: 3	NED; 0 G/2 S/1 B Totals: 3	CAN; 0 G/1 S/0 B Totals: 1	HUN; 0 G/0 S/1 B Totals: 1
2020s	USA; 2 G/0 S/0 B Totals: 2	HUN; 0 G/1 S/1 B Totals: 2	ESP; 0 G/1 S/0 B Totals: 1	RUS; 0 G/0 S/1 B Totals: 1						

==== Consecutive gold medals ====
Last updated: 9 August 2021 (after the 2020 Summer Olympics).

#	Women's team	Three or more consecutive gold medals (excluding the FINA World League)
1	Netherlands	1988 WCp (1), 1989 WCp (2), 1991 WCH (3), 1991 WCp (4), 1993 WCp (5)
2	United States	2014 WCp (1), 2015 WCH (2), 2016 OG (3), 2017 WCH (4), 2018 WCp (5), 2019 WCH (6), 2020 OG (7)

#	Women's team	Five or more consecutive gold medals (including the FINA World League)
1	United States	2009 WL (1), 2009 WCH (2), 2010 WL (3), 2010 WCp (4), 2011 WL (5)
2	United States	2014 WL (1), 2014 WCp (2), 2015 WL (3), 2015 WCH (4), 2016 WL (5), 2016 OG (6), 2017 WL (7), 2017 WCH (8), 2018 WL (9), 2018 WCp (10), 2019 WL (11), 2019 WCH (12), 2020 WL (13), 2020 OG (14)

=== Confederation statistics ===
==== National teams by confederation ====
Last updated: 9 August 2021 (after the 2020 Summer Olympics).

Confederation	Africa – CANA	Americas – UANA	Asia – AASF	Europe – LEN	Oceania – OSA
Women's team	None	Canada; United States	China	Greece; Hungary; Italy; Netherlands; Russia; Spain	Australia
Totals (10 teams)	0 teams	2 teams	1 team	6 teams	1 team

==== Medal table by confederation ====
The following tables are pre-sorted by number of gold medals (in descending order), number of silver medals (in descending order), number of bronze medals (in descending order), name of the confederation (in ascending order), respectively. Last updated: 9 August 2021 (after the 2020 Summer Olympics).

Medal table (excluding the FINA World League)
Rank	Confederation	Gold	Silver	Bronze	Total
1	Europe – LEN	18	20	18	56
2	Americas – UANA	14	10	9	33
3	Oceania – OSA	5	6	9	20
4	Asia – AASF	0	1	1	2
5	Africa – CANA	0	0	0	0
Totals (5 entries)		37	37	37	111

Medal table (including the FINA World League)
Rank	Confederation	Gold	Silver	Bronze	Total
1	Americas – UANA	28	13	10	51
2	Europe – LEN	20	30	28	78
3	Oceania – OSA	5	10	15	30
4	Asia – AASF	1	1	1	3
5	Africa – CANA	0	0	0	0
Totals (5 entries)		54	54	54	162

== Overall statistics ==
=== Medal table by nation ===
The following tables are pre-sorted by number of gold medals (in descending order), number of silver medals (in descending order), number of bronze medals (in descending order), name of the nation (in ascending order), respectively. Last updated: 9 August 2021 (after the 2020 Summer Olympics).

Legend

- Nation^{◊} – Nation that won medals in both the men's and women's tournaments
- Nation^{†} – Defunct nation

Medal table (excluding the FINA World League)
Rank	Nation	Gold	Silver	Bronze	Total
1	Hungary (HUN)^{◊}	19	16	12	47
2	United States (USA)^{◊}	15	13	7	35
3	Italy (ITA)^{◊}	11	11	8	30
4	Netherlands (NED)^{◊}	10	7	3	20
5	Yugoslavia (YUG)^{†}	7	6	3	16
6	Soviet Union (URS)^{†}	6	4	4	14
7	Serbia (SRB)	6	1	4	11
8	Australia (AUS)^{◊}	5	7	10	22
9	Spain (ESP)^{◊}	4	9	7	20
10	Great Britain (GBR)	4	0	0	4
11	Croatia (CRO)	3	4	5	12
12	Serbia and Montenegro (SCG)^{†}	2	1	1	4
13	Russia (RUS)^{◊}	1	3	12	16
14	Greece (GRE)^{◊}	1	3	2	6
15	Canada (CAN)	1	2	5	8
16	Germany (GER)	1	2	0	3
17	West Germany (FRG)^{†}	1	1	3	5
18	France (FRA)	1	0	3	4
19	Belgium (BEL)	0	4	2	6
20	Yugoslavia (FRY)^{†}	0	1	3	4
21	Sweden (SWE)	0	1	2	3
22	China (CHN)	0	1	1	2
23	Montenegro (MNE)	0	1	0	1
24	Cuba (CUB)	0	0	1	1
24	Unified Team^{†}	0	0	1	1
Totals (25 entries)		98	98	99	295

Medal table (including the FINA World League)
Rank	Nation	Gold	Silver	Bronze	Total
1	United States (USA)^{◊}	29	17	9	55
2	Hungary (HUN)^{◊}	21	23	13	57
3	Serbia (SRB)	16	1	5	22
4	Italy (ITA)^{◊}	11	18	10	39
5	Netherlands (NED)^{◊}	10	8	4	22
6	Yugoslavia (YUG)^{†}	7	6	3	16
7	Soviet Union (URS)^{†}	6	4	4	14
8	Australia (AUS)^{◊}	5	11	19	35
9	Spain (ESP)^{◊}	4	13	8	25
10	Croatia (CRO)	4	7	8	19
11	Serbia and Montenegro (SCG)^{†}	4	2	1	7
12	Great Britain (GBR)	4	0	0	4
13	Russia (RUS)^{◊}	3	5	17	25
14	Montenegro (MNE)	3	2	2	7
15	Greece (GRE)^{◊}	2	3	9	14
16	Canada (CAN)	1	4	5	10
17	Germany (GER)	1	2	1	4
18	West Germany (FRG)^{†}	1	1	3	5
19	China (CHN)	1	1	1	3
20	France (FRA)	1	0	3	4
21	Belgium (BEL)	0	4	2	6
22	Yugoslavia (FRY)^{†}	0	1	3	4
23	Sweden (SWE)	0	1	2	3
24	Brazil (BRA)	0	0	1	1
24	Cuba (CUB)	0	0	1	1
24	Unified Team^{†}	0	0	1	1
Totals (26 entries)		134	134	135	403

=== National teams by confederation ===
Last updated: 9 August 2021 (after the 2020 Summer Olympics).

Legend

- Team^{†} – Defunct team

Confederation	Africa – CANA		Americas – UANA		Asia – AASF		Europe – LEN		Oceania – OSA	
Confederation	Men	Women	Men	Women	Men	Women	Men	Women	Men	Women
Team	—	—	Brazil	—	—	China	Belgium	—	Australia	Australia
Team	—	—	—	Canada	—	—	Croatia	—	—	—
Team	—	—	Cuba	—	—	—	France	—	—	—
Team	—	—	United States	United States	—	—	Germany	—	—	—
Team	—	—	—	—	—	—	Great Britain	—	—	—
Team	—	—	—	—	—	—	Greece	Greece	—	—
Team	—	—	—	—	—	—	Hungary	Hungary	—	—
Team	—	—	—	—	—	—	Italy	Italy	—	—
Team	—	—	—	—	—	—	Montenegro	—	—	—
Team	—	—	—	—	—	—	Netherlands	Netherlands	—	—
Team	—	—	—	—	—	—	Russia	Russia	—	—
Team	—	—	—	—	—	—	Serbia	—	—	—
Team	—	—	—	—	—	—	Serbia and Montenegro^{†}	—	—	—
Team	—	—	—	—	—	—	Soviet Union^{†}	—	—	—
Team	—	—	—	—	—	—	Spain	Spain	—	—
Team	—	—	—	—	—	—	Sweden	—	—	—
Team	—	—	—	—	—	—	(International Olympic Committee) Unified Team^{†}	—	—	—
Team	—	—	—	—	—	—	West Germany^{†}	—	—	—
Team	—	—	—	—	—	—	Yugoslavia^{†}	—	—	—
Team	—	—	—	—	—	—	Yugoslavia^{†}	—	—	—
Totals (34 teams)	0 teams	0 teams	3 teams	2 teams	0 teams	1 team	20 teams	6 teams	1 team	1 team
Totals (34 teams)	0 teams		5 teams		1 team		26 teams		2 teams	

=== Medal table by confederation ===
The following tables are pre-sorted by number of gold medals (in descending order), number of silver medals (in descending order), number of bronze medals (in descending order), name of the confederation (in ascending order), respectively. Last updated: 9 August 2021 (after the 2020 Summer Olympics).

Medal table (excluding the FINA World League)
Rank	Confederation	Gold	Silver	Bronze	Total
1	Europe – LEN	77	75	75	227
2	Americas – UANA	16	15	13	44
3	Oceania – OSA	5	7	10	22
4	Asia – AASF	0	1	1	2
5	Africa – CANA	0	0	0	0
Totals (5 entries)		98	98	99	295

Medal table (including the FINA World League)
Rank	Confederation	Gold	Silver	Bronze	Total
1	Europe – LEN	98	101	99	298
2	Americas – UANA	30	21	16	67
3	Oceania – OSA	5	11	19	35
4	Asia – AASF	1	1	1	3
5	Africa – CANA	0	0	0	0
Totals (5 entries)		134	134	135	403

== See also ==
- Water polo at the Summer Olympics
- Water polo at the World Aquatics Championships
- FINA Water Polo World Cup
- FINA Women's Water Polo World Cup
- FINA Water Polo World League
- Major achievements in water polo by nation
- FINA Water Polo World Rankings
