= Water polo in the United States =

- Country: United States
- Governing body: USA Water Polo
- National teams: Men's national team Women's national team

International competitions
- Olympic Games; World Aquatics Championships; FINA Water Polo World Cup; FINA Water Polo World League; Pan American Games

Water polo in the United States is governed by different organizations. The USA Water Polo (USAWP) governs most levels of water polo in the country, including the national teams and amateur tournaments. The National Collegiate Athletic Association (NCAA) governs colleges, and the National Federation of State High School Associations (NFHS) governs high schools. No professional water polo leagues run in the United States.

== National water polo teams ==
The United States men's and women's national water polo teams represent the United States in international tournaments, including the Olympic Games, World Aquatics Championships, FINA Water Polo World Cup, FINA Water Polo World League, and Pan American Games.

=== Men's national team ===
The United States men's national water polo team has won multiple medals in international tournaments. In 1988 and 2009, the United States rose to World No. 2 in the FINA Water Polo World Rankings, their highest ranking to date.

==== Olympic Games ====
Men's water polo tournaments have been staged at the Olympic Games since 1900. The United States has participated in 22 of 27 tournaments.

The United States men's national water polo team is the only non-European squad to win medals in the men's Olympic water polo tournament. At the 1904 Olympic Games, The U.S. squad won the gold, silver and bronze medals in the men's water polo tournament (demonstration event). Since 1904 the team has won three silver medals at the 1984, 1988, and 2008 Olympic Games, and three bronze medals at the 1924, 1932, and 1972 Olympic Games. The team also finished fourth at the 1920, 1952 and 1992 Olympic Games.

==== Other international tournaments ====
Men's water polo tournaments have been staged at the FINA World Aquatics Championships since 1973. The United States has participated in every tournament, but the team has not won any medals. The best finish is fourth place (1986, 1991 and 2009). (Note: European squads have won all medals in the men's water polo tournaments.)

The FINA Men's Water Polo World Cup was established in 1979. The United States has participated in 15 of 16 tournaments. The team has won the 1991 and 1997 FINA Men's Water Polo World Cup, becoming the only non-European squad to win the FINA Men's Water Polo World Cup. The team also finished as runners-up in 1979 and 1985. In addition, the team finished in fourth place 7 times (1981, 1983, 1987, 1993, 1995, 2010 and 2014).

The FINA Men's Water Polo World League began in 2002. The United States has participated in 17 of 18 tournaments. The team finished in second place twice (2008 and 2016), third place once (2003), and fourth place 7 times (2007, 2009, 2011, 2012, 2013, 2015 and 2017).

Men's water polo tournaments have been staged at the Pan American Games since 1951. The United States team has participated and medaled in all eighteen tournaments. Since 1995, the team has won seven gold medals in a row (1995, 1999, 2003, 2007, 2011, 2015 and 2019).

==== Competitive record ====
Updated after the 2019 Pan American Games.

Tournament	Appearances	Finishes				
Tournament	Appearances	Champions	Runners-up	Third place	Fourth place	Total
Olympic Games	22	0 (1) (Note: At the 1904 Olympic Games, The U.S. squad won the gold, silver and bronze medals in the men's water polo tournament (demonstration event).)	3 (4)	3 (4)	3	9 (12)
World Aquatics Championships	18	0	0	0	3	3
FINA Water Polo World Cup	15	2	2	0	7	11
FINA Water Polo World League	17	0	2	1	7	10
Pan American Games	18	13	4	1	0	18
Total	90	15 (16)	11 (12)	5 (6)	20	51 (54)

=== Women's national team ===
The United States fielded a women's national water polo team in the 1970s. Two decades later, the women's team became one of the leading teams in the world. Since 2014, the team has consecutively been ranked as World No. 1 team in the FINA Water Polo World Rankings.

==== Olympic Games ====
A women's water polo tournament was introduced for the 2000 Olympic Games. Since then, the United States has participated in every tournament.

The United States women's national water polo team is the only team to have medaled in all five Olympic tournaments, and the only team to have won two gold medals (2012, 2016). In addition, the team has won two silver medals at the 2000 and 2008 Olympic Games.

==== Other international tournaments ====
Women's water polo tournaments have been staged at the FINA World Aquatics Championships since 1986. The United States has participated in every tournament, and captured six world championship titles (2003, 2007, 2009, 2015, 2017, and 2019). The team also finished as runners-up in 2005.

The FINA Women's Water Polo World Cup was established in 1979. The United States has participated in every tournament. The team has won the 1979, 2010, 2014 and 2018 FINA Women's Water Polo World Cup. In addition, the team finished in second place 5 times (1980, 1983, 1984, 1989 and 2002).

The FINA Women's Water Polo World League began in 2004. The United States has participated in every tournament. The team has finished in first place 13 times. As of today, there are only three tournaments in which the United States participated but did not receive a gold medal.

Women's water polo tournaments have been staged at the Pan American Games since 1999. The United States team has participated and medaled in all six tournaments. Since 2003, the team has won five gold medals in a row (2003, 2007, 2011, 2015 and 2019).

==== Competitive record ====
Updated after the 2019 Pan American Games.

Tournament	Appearances	Finishes				
Tournament	Appearances	Champions	Runners-up	Third place	Fourth place	Total
Olympic Games	5	2	2	1	0	5
World Aquatics Championships	14	6	1	2	2	11
FINA Water Polo World Cup	17	4	5	1	3	13
FINA Water Polo World League	16	13	1	1	0	15
Pan American Games	6	5	1	0	0	6
Total	58	30	10	5	5	50

== College water polo ==
Water polo does not have a professional tournament in the United States, so the highest level of annual competition is at the college level. As a varsity sport for both men and women, the NCAA sanctions water polo is popular in the United States along the west coast, and parts of the east coast.

=== Men's college water polo ===
In the 2017–18 school year, 48 NCAA member schools sponsored men's water polo at the varsity level, with 1,047 participants across all three divisions.

Men's college water polo (1956–2018)
School year	Total member institutions	Total teams	% of member institutions	Total athletes	Average squad size
1956–1957	395	11	2.8%	272	24.7
1961–1962	536	30	5.6%	675	22.5
1966–1967	577	31	5.4%	755	24.4
1971–1972	663	52	7.8%	1,162	22.3
1976–1977	722	48	6.6%	975	20.3
1981–1982	753	49	6.5%	1,002	20.4
1982–1983	788	51	6.5%	1,181	23.2
1983–1984	786	52	6.6%	1,101	21.2
1984–1985	791	52	6.6%	1,114	21.4
1985–1986	794	53	6.7%	1,128	21.3
1986–1987	792	56	7.1%	1,121	20.0
1987–1988	793	58	7.3%	1,170	20.2
1988–1989	800	58	7.3%	1,189	20.5
1989–1990	802	55	6.9%	1,106	20.1
1990–1991	828	54	6.5%	1,151	21.3
1991–1992	847	48	5.7%	996	20.8
1992–1993	864	47	5.4%	978	20.8
1993–1994	892	39	4.4%	841	21.6
1994–1995	947	37	3.9%	747	20.2
1995–1996	998	44	4.4%	862	19.6
1996–1997	994	42	4.2%	892	21.2
1997–1998	985	43	4.4%	970	22.6
1998–1999	1,031	43	4.2%	908	21.1
1999–2000	1,041	42	4.0%	825	19.7
2000–2001	1,039	46	4.4%	911	19.8
2001–2002	1,036	48	4.6%	891	18.6
2002–2003	1,033	46	4.5%	855	18.6
2003–2004	1,039	46	4.4%	865	18.8
2004–2005	1,045	46	4.4%	939	20.4
2005–2006	1,062	45	4.2%	942	20.9
2006–2007	1,064	41	3.9%	893	21.8
2007–2008	1,070	42	3.9%	919	21.9
2008–2009	1,069	42	3.9%	914	21.8
2009–2010	1,073	41	3.8%	925	22.6
2010–2011	1,087	43	4.0%	1,018	23.7
2011–2012	1,096	43	3.9%	1,015	23.6
2012–2013	1,106	43	3.9%	999	23.2
2013–2014	1,113	44	4.0%	1,051	23.9
2014–2015	1,119	44	3.9%	1,044	23.7
2015–2016	1,119	45	4.0%	1,014	22.5
2016–2017	1,116	47	4.2%	1,013	21.6
2017–2018	1,114	48	4.3%	1,047	21.8
School year	Total member institutions	Total teams	% of member institutions	Total athletes	Average squad size

==== NCAA Men's Water Polo Championship ====
The NCAA Men's Water Polo Championship is an annual tournament to determine the national champion of NCAA men's collegiate water polo. It has been held every year since 1969. All men's teams, whether from Division I, Division II, or Division III, are eligible to compete each year.

NCAA Men's Water Polo Championship (1969–2018)
College	Team	Champions	Runners-up	Total
University of California, Berkeley	California Golden Bears	14	8	22
University of California, Los Angeles	UCLA Bruins	11	9	20
University of Southern California	USC Trojans	10	12	22
Stanford University	Stanford Cardinal	10	11	21
University of California, Irvine	UC Irvine Anteaters	3	6	9
Pepperdine University	Pepperdine Waves	1	0	1
University of California, Santa Barbara	UC Santa Barbara Gauchos	1	0	1
California State University, Long Beach	Long Beach State 49ers	0	1	1
San Jose State University	San Jose State Spartans	0	1	1
University of California, San Diego	UC San Diego Tritons	0	1	1
University of the Pacific	Pacific Tigers	0	1	1
Total	11	50	50	100

=== Women's college water polo ===
In the 2017–18 school year, 62 NCAA member schools sponsored women's water polo at the varsity level, with 1,216 participants across all three divisions.

Women's college water polo (1995–2018)
School year	Total member institutions	Total teams	% of member institutions	Total athletes	Average squad size
1995–1996	998	20	2.0%	374	18.7
1996–1997	994	23	2.3%	451	19.6
1997–1998	985	32	3.2%	661	20.7
1998–1999	1,031	37	3.6%	746	20.2
1999–2000	1,041	40	3.8%	833	20.8
2000–2001	1,039	50	4.8%	1,057	21.1
2001–2002	1,036	55	5.3%	1,055	19.2
2002–2003	1,033	56	5.4%	1,051	18.8
2003–2004	1,039	59	5.7%	1,126	19.1
2004–2005	1,045	61	5.8%	1,193	19.6
2005–2006	1,062	61	5.8%	1,173	19.2
2006–2007	1,064	61	5.7%	1,148	18.8
2007–2008	1,070	60	5.6%	1,155	19.3
2008–2009	1,069	60	5.6%	1,156	19.3
2009–2010	1,073	59	5.5%	1,164	19.7
2010–2011	1,087	60	5.5%	1,193	19.9
2011–2012	1,096	64	5.8%	1,219	19.0
2012–2013	1,106	61	5.5%	1,173	19.2
2013–2014	1,113	61	5.5%	1,201	19.7
2014–2015	1,119	60	5.4%	1,152	19.2
2015–2016	1,119	59	5.3%	1,136	19.3
2016–2017	1,116	61	5.5%	1,159	19.0
2017–2018	1,114	62	5.6%	1,216	19.6
School year	Total member institutions	Total teams	% of member institutions	Total athletes	Average squad size

==== NCAA Women's Water Polo Championship ====
The NCAA Women's Water Polo Championship is an annual tournament to determine the national champion of NCAA women's collegiate water polo. It has been held every year since 2001. All women's teams, whether from Division I, Division II, or Division III, are eligible to compete each year.

NCAA Women's Water Polo Championship (2001–2019)
College	Team	Champions	Runners-up	Total
Stanford University	Stanford Cardinal	7	8	15
University of California, Los Angeles	UCLA Bruins	7	4	11
University of Southern California	USC Trojans	5	5	10
Loyola Marymount University	Loyola Marymount Lions	0	1	1
University of California, Berkeley	California Golden Bears	0	1	1
Total	5	19	19	38

== High school water polo ==
High school water polo is popular in some states, including California, Florida and Illinois.

=== Boys' high school water polo ===
The National Federation of State High School Associations featured 22,475 boys in water polo teams in the 2018–19 school year.

Boys' high school water polo (1969–2019)
School year	Number of states	States^{*}	Number of schools	Number of participants	Average squad size	Ref.
1969–1970	2	CA, HI	152	5,854	38.5	
1971–1972	2	CA, HI	155	6,000	38.7	
1973–1974	4	CA, HI, MO, OH	288	9,754	33.9	
1975–1976	6	CA, HI, MI, MO, NV, OH	363	12,149	33.5	
1977–1978	7	CA, FL, HI, IL, MI, MO, OH	397	12,455	31.4	
1978–1979	4	CA, FL, HI, MO	355	10,027	28.2	
1979–1980	6	CA, FL, HI, MI, MO, UT	363	10,168	28.0	
1980–1981	7	CA, FL, HI, MI, MO, NV, PA	354	10,279	29.0	
1981–1982	8	CA, FL, HI, IL, MI, MO, NV, PA	369	8,931	24.2	
1982–1983	8	CA, FL, HI, IL, MI, MO, NV, UT	368	8,675	23.6	
1983–1984	7	CA, FL, HI, IL, MI, NV, PA	308	7,634	24.8	
1984–1985	6	CA, FL, IL, MI, NV, PA	304	7,689	25.3	
1985–1986	7	CA, FL, MI, MO, NE, PA, UT	340	8,635	25.4	
1986–1987	9	CA, FL, HI, IL, MI, MO, NV, OH, PA	374	9,686	25.9	
1987–1988	9	CA, FL, HI, IL, MI, MO, OH, PA, UT	353	9,664	27.4	
1988–1989	8	CA, FL, HI, ME, MI, MO, OH, PA	336	9,315	27.7	
1989–1990	9	CA, FL, HI, ME, MI, MO, NV, OH, PA	343	9,465	27.6	
1990–1991	9	CA, FL, HI, ME, MI, MO, NV, OH, PA	344	9,709	28.2	
1991–1992	8	CA, FL, HI, ME, MI, MO, OH, PA	391	10,273	26.3	
1992–1993	6	CA, FL, MI, MO, OH, PA	387	9,985	25.8	
1993–1994	5	CA, HI, MO, OH, PA	412	10,562	25.6	
1994–1995	7	CA, FL, HI, MO, NV, OH, PA	412	10,599	25.7	
1995–1996	7	CA, FL, HI, MO, NV, OH, PA	430	10,238	23.8	
1996–1997	8	CA, FL, HI, MI, MO, NV, OH, PA	442	10,528	23.8	
1997–1998	8	CA, FL, MI, MO, NV, OH, PA, TX	549	13,247	24.1	
1998–1999	9	CA, FL, HI, MI, MO, NV, OH, PA, TX	581	13,763	23.7	
1999–2000	8	CA, FL, HI, MI, MO, OH, PA, TX	572	13,871	24.3	
2000–2001	6	CA, FL, HI, MI, OH, PA	525	12,905	24.6	
2001–2002	6	CA, FL, HI, IL, OH, PA	568	13,735	24.2	
2002–2003	8	CA, FL, HI, IL, MI, MO, OH, PA	619	15,279	24.7	
2003–2004	8	CA, FL, HI, IL, MI, MO, OH, PA	635	15,649	24.6	
2004–2005	8	CA, FL, HI, IL, MI, MO, OH, PA	645	16,822	26.1	
2005–2006	8	CA, FL, HI, IL, MI, MO, OH, PA	658	17,061	25.9	
2006–2007	8	CA, FL, HI, IL, MI, MO, OH, PA	725	18,502	25.5	
2007–2008	7	CA, FL, HI, IL, MI, OH, PA	698	18,032	25.8	
2008–2009	8	CA, FL, HI, IL, MI, MO, OH, PA	746	20,650	27.7	
2009–2010	8	CA, FL, HI, IL, MI, MO, OH, PA	758	20,749	27.4	
2010–2011	8	CA, FL, HI, IL, MI, MO, OH, PA	768	20,757	27.0	
2011–2012	8	CA, FL, HI, IL, MI, MO, OH, PA	783	20,721	26.5	
2012–2013	8	CA, FL, HI, IL, MI, MO, OH, PA	789	21,943	27.8	
2013–2014	9	CA, DC, FL, HI, IL, MI, MO, OH, PA	795	21,451	27.0	
2014–2015	9	CA, DC, FL, HI, IL, MI, MO, OH, PA	807	21,626	26.8	
2015–2016	9	CA, DC, FL, HI, IL, MI, MO, OH, PA	826	21,857	26.5	
2016–2017	9	CA, DC, FL, HI, IL, MI, MO, OH, PA	822	21,286	25.9	
2017–2018	9	CA, DC, FL, HI, IL, MI, MO, OH, PA	838	22,501	26.9	
2018–2019	8	CA, FL, HI, IL, MI, MO, OH, PA	862	22,475	26.1	
School year	Number of states	States^{*}	Number of schools	Number of participants	Average squad size	Ref.

^{*}Abbreviations: CA – California, DC – Washington, D.C., FL – Florida, HI – Hawaii, IL – Illinois, ME – Maine, MI – Michigan, MO – Missouri, NE – Nebraska, NV – Nevada, OH – Ohio, PA – Pennsylvania, TX – Texas, UT – Utah.

=== Girls' high school water polo ===
The National Federation of State High School Associations featured 21,735 girls in water polo teams in the 2018–19 school year.

Girls' high school water polo (1975–2019)
School year	Number of states	States^{#}	Number of schools	Number of participants	Average squad size	Ref.
1975–1976	0	––	0	0	––	
1977–1978	1	FL	28	372	13.3	
1978–1979	1	FL	27	365	13.5	
1979–1980	2	FL, UT	28	390	13.9	
1980–1981	3	CA, FL, HI	30	282	9.4	
1981–1982	4	CA, FL, IL, NV	33	879	26.6	
1982–1983	7	CA, FL, HI, IL, NV, PA, UT	52	1,137	21.9	
1983–1984	4	CA, FL, HI, NV	41	475	11.6	
1984–1985	3	CA, FL, NV	32	424	13.3	
1985–1986	5	CA, FL, NV, PA, UT	128	951	7.4	
1986–1987	6	CA, FL, IL, NV, OH, PA	130	977	7.5	
1987–1988	7	CA, FL, HI, IL, OH, PA, UT	61	874	14.3	
1988–1989	7	CA, FL, HI, ME, OH, PA, UT	59	900	15.3	
1989–1990	7	CA, FL, HI, ME, NV, OH, PA	59	869	14.7	
1990–1991	7	CA, FL, HI, ME, NV, OH, PA	70	1,016	14.5	
1991–1992	6	CA, FL, HI, MI, OH, PA	122	1,260	10.3	
1992–1993	4	CA, FL, OH, PA	117	1,260	10.8	
1993–1994	6	CA, FL, HI, MI, OH, PA	259	2,225	8.6	
1994–1995	6	CA, FL, HI, NV, OH, PA	269	2,129	7.9	
1995–1996	6	CA, FL, HI, NV, OH, PA	173	4,564	26.4	
1996–1997	6	N/A	179	4,751	26.5	
1997–1998	8	N/A	466	10,800	23.2	
1998–1999	7	CA, FL, HI, MI, OH, PA, TX	506	11,628	23.0	
1999–2000	7	CA, FL, HI, MI, OH, PA, TX	506	11,856	23.4	
2000–2001	6	CA, FL, HI, MI, OH, PA	546	14,023	25.7	
2001–2002	6	CA, FL, HI, IL, OH, PA	582	14,792	25.4	
2002–2003	8	CA, FL, HI, IL, MI, MO, OH, PA	621	15,870	25.6	
2003–2004	8	CA, FL, HI, IL, MI, MO, OH, PA	629	16,362	26.0	
2004–2005	7	CA, FL, HI, IL, MI, OH, PA	668	17,241	25.8	
2005–2006	7	CA, FL, HI, IL, MI, OH, PA	678	17,442	25.7	
2006–2007	7	CA, FL, HI, IL, MI, OH, PA	716	17,791	24.8	
2007–2008	7	CA, FL, HI, IL, MI, OH, PA	712	17,773	25.0	
2008–2009	7	CA, FL, HI, IL, MI, OH, PA	740	18,418	24.9	
2009–2010	7	CA, FL, HI, IL, MI, OH, PA	745	18,592	25.0	
2010–2011	7	CA, FL, HI, IL, MI, OH, PA	762	18,603	24.4	
2011–2012	7	CA, FL, HI, IL, MI, OH, PA	785	18,749	23.9	
2012–2013	7	CA, FL, HI, IL, MI, OH, PA	775	18,674	24.1	
2013–2014	7	CA, FL, HI, IL, MI, OH, PA	784	18,899	24.1	
2014–2015	7	CA, FL, HI, IL, MI, OH, PA	805	19,204	23.9	
2015–2016	7	CA, FL, HI, IL, MI, OH, PA	827	20,230	24.5	
2016–2017	7	CA, FL, HI, IL, MI, OH, PA	831	20,826	25.1	
2017–2018	7	CA, FL, HI, IL, MI, OH, PA	844	21,054	24.9	
2018–2019	7	CA, FL, HI, IL, MI, OH, PA	881	21,735	24.7	
School year	Number of states	States^{#}	Number of schools	Number of participants	Average squad size	Ref.

^{#}Abbreviations: CA – California, FL – Florida, HI – Hawaii, IL – Illinois, ME – Maine, MI – Michigan, MO – Missouri, NV – Nevada, OH – Ohio, PA – Pennsylvania, TX – Texas, UT – Utah.

== USA Water Polo Hall of Fame ==
The USA Water Polo Hall of Fame was established by the USA Water Polo in 1976 to honor players, coaches and officials who have contributed greatly to water polo in the United States.

== See also ==
- USA Water Polo
- United States men's national water polo team
- United States women's national water polo team
- NCAA Men's Water Polo Championship
- NCAA Women's Water Polo Championship
- USA Water Polo Hall of Fame
