= Yevgeny Sharonov =

Russian water polo player

Personal information
- Born: 11 December 1958 (age 67) Dzerzhinsk, Soviet Union

Sport
- Sport: Water polo
Medal record
Representing the Soviet Union
Olympic Games
Gold medal – first place	1980 Moscow	Team competition
Bronze medal – third place	1988 Seoul	Team competition
World Championships
Gold medal – first place	1982 Guayaquil	Team competition
Bronze medal – third place	1986 Madrid	Team competition
European Championships
Gold medal – first place	1983 Rome	Team competition
Gold medal – first place	1985 Sofia	Team competition
Gold medal – first place	1987 Strasbourg	Team competition
Silver medal – second place	1981 Split	Team competition
Representing the Unified Team
Olympic Games
Bronze medal – third place	1992 Barcelona	Team competition

Yevgeny Sharonov (born 11 December 1958) is a Russian former water polo player who competed in the 1980 Summer Olympics, in the 1988 Summer Olympics, and in the 1992 Summer Olympics.

== Biography ==
Sharonov was born on 11 December 1958 in Dzerzhinsk, Gorky Oblast. Whilst studying at school he was engaged in basketball and swimming, then he became interested in water polo. He attended water polo section at the Dzerzhinsk Children's and Youth Sports School.

Graduated from the Russian State University of Physical Education, Sport, Youth and Tourism in 1983 and the All-Union Academy of Foreign Trade in 1988. Member of the Communist Party since 1983.

=== Sport career ===
Played for the team of the Automobile Factory in Honour of the Leninist Communist Youth Union (Moscow) from 1976 to 1992. In 1990-1991 played in Italy for the club ORTIGIA (Syracuse).

Won gold medal at the 1980 Summer Olympics, was two-time Olympic bronze medallist (1988 Summer Olympics representing Soviet Union; 1992 Summer Olympics playing for the Unified Team).

Won gold medal at the 1982 World Championships, was a bronze medallist at the 1986 World Championships. Two-time World Cup winner (1981, 1983), silver medallist (1987). Three-time European Championship winner (1983, 1985, 1987), was a silver medallist (1981).

Champion of the Universiade (1985), silver medallist (1979). Champion of the first Goodwill Games in 1986. Two-time winner of the Spartakiad of the Peoples of the USSR as a member of the Moscow team (1979, 1983).

He has been the member of the FINA Technical Water Polo Committee since 1996.

In 2003 he was included in the International Swimming Hall of Fame.

In 2012 he was elected President of the Russian Water Polo Federation.

== Awards ==
- Order of the Badge of Honour (1980)
- Order of Friendship of Peoples (1984)
- Medal "For Labour Valour" (1988)
- Order of Friendship (2002)

== See also ==
- Soviet Union men's Olympic water polo team records and statistics
- List of Olympic champions in men's water polo
- List of Olympic medalists in water polo (men)
- List of men's Olympic water polo tournament goalkeepers
- List of world champions in men's water polo
- List of World Aquatics Championships medalists in water polo
- List of members of the International Swimming Hall of Fame
