= Goran Rađenović =

Water polo player

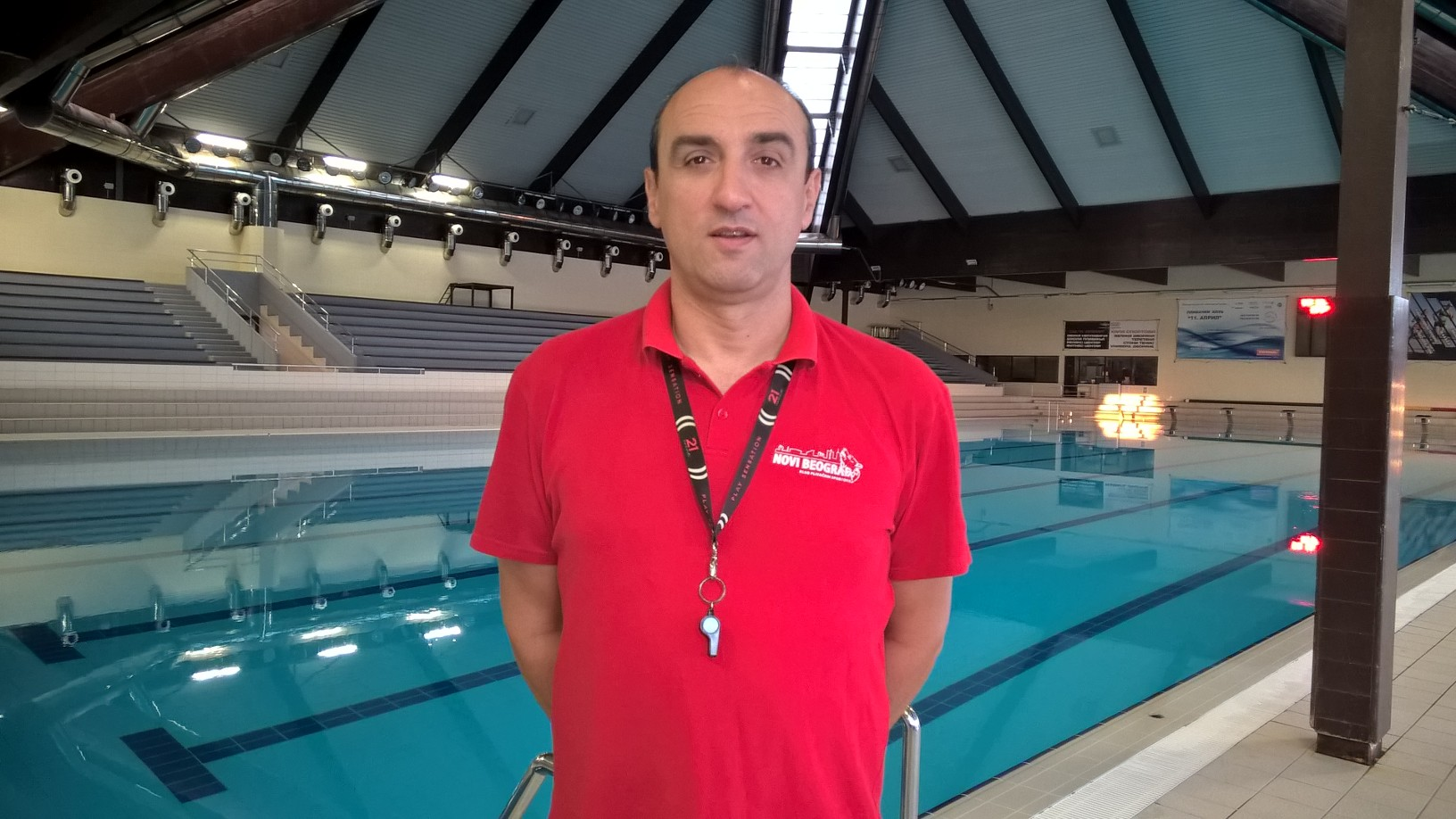
- Rađenović - portrait

Personal information
- Born: 4 November 1966 (age 59) Niš, SR Serbia, Yugoslavia
Medal record
Men's water polo
Representing Yugoslavia
Olympic Games
Gold medal – first place	1988 Seoul	Team
World Championship
Gold medal – first place	1991 Perth	Team
European Championship
Silver medal – second place	1985 Sofia	Water polo
Silver medal – second place	1987 Strasbourg	Water polo
Silver medal – second place	1989 Bonn	Water polo
Gold medal – first place	1991 Athens	Water polo
World Cup
Gold medal – first place	1987 Thessaloniki	Water polo
Gold medal – first place	1989 West-Berlin	Water polo
Mediterranean Games
Silver medal – second place	1991 Athens	Team
Universiade
Bronze medal – third place	1987 Zagreb	Team

Goran Rađenović (Serbian Cyrillic: Горан Рађеновић; born 4 November 1966 in Niš) is a former Serbian water polo player and now he is water polo coach. During his career he played in Partizan, Roma and Budva and won numerous national and international trophies. The most of his successes are from the time when he was part of national team of Yugoslavia. He played for national team 265 times and won Olympic, World and European Championship.

== Early life ==
Goran Rađenović grew up in Blokovi, New Belgrade. He started swimming lessons with Goran Kasum (who also lived at the same place) when he was in the first grade.

== Club career ==
=== VK Partizan ===
Rađenović started playing water polo at the age of 8 in water polo Club Partizan from Belgrade. He played in Partizan for 18 years and went through all age groups. In younger categories he won many titles.

He made his senior debut for Partizan in 1982 when he was 16 years old and he played in Partizan until 1992.

Titles won with Partizan:

- National Championship of Yugoslavia (3): 1983/84, 1986/87, 1987/88;
- National Cup of Yugoslavia (7): 1981/82, 1984/85, 1986/87, 1987/88, 1989/90, 1990/91, 1991/92;
- European Cup of Cups (1): 1989/90;
- European Super Cup (1): 1990/91;
- COMEN Cup (1): 1989.

=== Roma ===
In 1992 Rađenović transferred from Partizan to Water polo Club Roma from Rome and for that club he played for four years.

Titles won with Roma:

- Three second places in The National Championship of Italy,
- European Cup of Cups (1) 1995/96.
- Len Euro Cup(1) 1993/94.

=== Budva ===
His last season (1996/97) as a player he spent in Water polo Club Budva but earlier during 1994. He spent few month in Budva and won National Championship of Yugoslavia.

== National team ==
He went through all age groups of the national team of Yugoslavia and with the national team he won a great number of medals and titles. He made his debut for the national team in 1984 and in the following ten years he played 265 times for the team. This was the most successful period for water polo sport in Yugoslavia. Goran won two Olympic gold medals at two World Championships and for the first time, the European Championship was won by him as well. Rađenović was a member of a team that won Olympic gold in Seoul, World Championship gold medal in Perth and European Championship trophy in Athens.

== Coaching career ==
=== Budva ===
After finishing his playing career in Water polo Club Budva in 1997 he became coach of a team in the same club. In season 1997/98 he won second place in the National Championship of Yugoslavia and in European Cup he made it to semifinals.

=== Bečej ===
The following two seasons he was coaching A team of Bečej Water polo Club. With Bečej he won two National Championships and two National Cups of Yugoslavia and one second place in European Champions Cup.

=== Anzio ===
He started coaching Anzio in season 2000/01 and in his first season he won first place in A2 Italian league. Following season he ended taking the team into Italian A1 Championship play off.

=== Camogli ===
From 2002 to 2006 he was coach of a team in Water polo Club Camogli and he was in charge of all younger teams of the club. During those four seasons his team was ranked from 5th to 8th place in National Championships of Italy as well as one semifinals in LEN Cup. Parallelly young categories win many first places in theirs championships.

=== Nervi ===
From 2006 to 2008 he worked as coach in Water polo Club Nervi from Genova. During two seasons in this club he was ranked 6 and 8 in A1 National Championship of Italy.

=== Pro Recco ===
From 2008 to 2014 he was in charge of younger categories of one of the biggest European clubs, Pro Recco from Recco and coordinator of water polo clubs from the region of Liguria. With this club he made huge success in championships of younger categories of Italy.

== See also ==
- Yugoslavia men's Olympic water polo team records and statistics
- List of Olympic champions in men's water polo
- List of Olympic medalists in water polo (men)
- List of world champions in men's water polo
- List of World Aquatics Championships medalists in water polo
