= Nikola Stamenić =

Serbian water polo coach

Personal information
- Nickname: The General
- Born: April 17, 1949 (age 77) Belgrade, FPR Yugoslavia
Medal record
Men's Water Polo
Representing Yugoslavia and Serbia and Montenegro
World Championship
Gold medal – first place	1991 Perth	Team (coach)
Bronze medal – third place	1998 Perth	Team (coach)
European Championship
Gold medal – first place	1991 Athens	Team (coach)
Silver medal – second place	1989 Bonn	Team (coach)
Silver medal – second place	1997 Seville	Team (coach)
World Cup
Gold medal – first place	1989 Berlin	Team (coach)
Silver medal – second place	1991 Barcelona	Team (coach)
Mediterranean Games
Gold medal – first place	1997 Bari	Team (coach)
Silver medal – second place	1991 Athens	Team (coach)

Nikola Stamenić (Serbian Cyrillic: Никола Стаменић; born 17 April 1949), also known as "the General", is a Serbian water polo coach widely considered one of the greatest coaches in water polo history. Under his guidance, Yugoslavia men's national water polo team won the gold medal in both the 1991 World Championship in Perth and the 1991 European Championship in Athens, becoming World and European Champions in the same year. At club level he successfully coached (most notably) Olympiacos, Crvena Zvezda, Partizan, Bečej and Marseille.

== Playing career ==
Stamenić was born in Belgrade, Serbia, SFR Yugoslavia. He played water polo most notably for Partizan Belgrade, where he won two back-to-back European Champions Cups in 1975 and 1976 under the guidance of coach Vlaho Orlić. He was also a member of the Yugoslavia men's national water polo team, winning two bronze medals in the 1973 World Championship in Belgrade and the 1974 European Championship in Vienna.

== Coaching career ==
In 1988, after the departure of Ratko Rudić, he became the head coach of Yugoslavia men's national water polo team (and after 1992, head coach of the Serbia men's national water polo team until 1999). Under his guidance, Yugoslavia was crowned World and European Champions in 1991 and won numerous gold and silver medals in many major international water polo competitions.

At club level he coached VK Crvena zvezda to the first National Championship in their history in 1992. Stamenić then moved to Greece, where he coached ANO Glyfada from 1994 to 1997. In 1997 he coached VK Bečej and led them to the domestic double, winning both the Serbian Championship and Cup. In 1998 he became coach of Olympiacos and led the Greek powerhouse in two consecutive Greek Championships (1999, 2000) as well as the final of the 1999 LEN Cup Winners' Cup. He became a legend for the club and his contribution to Olympiacos and to Greek water polo in general is considered enormous. He coached CN Marseille from 2002 to 2005 and won the French Championship in 2005, which was Marseille's first championship title since 1996. His training methods, his tactics and his deep understanding of every aspect of the game of water polo exerted a great influence on every player that ever played under his guidance.

== See also ==
- List of world champions in men's water polo
