= Igor Milanović =

Serbian water polo player

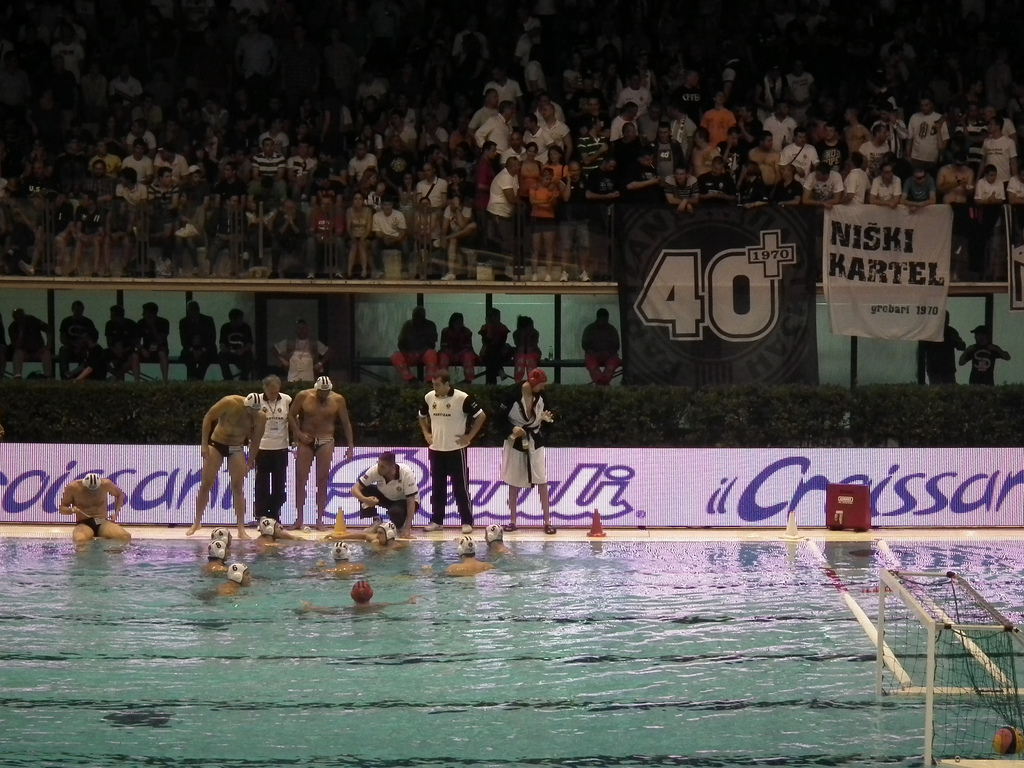
- Milanović coaching VK Partizan during LEN Euroleague Final Four in Rome in June 2011.

Personal information
- Nationality: Serbian
- Born: 18 December 1965 (age 60) Belgrade, SR Serbia, SFR Yugoslavia

Sport
- Sport: Water polo

Senior clubs
- Years: Team
- 1975–1989: Partizan
- 1989–1991: Mladost
- 1991–1992: Crvena zvezda
- 1992–1994: Roma
- 1994: Budvanska rivijera
- 1994–1995: CN Catalunya
- 1995–1996: Partizan

Teams coached
- 2009–2014: Partizan
- 2014–2015: Pro Recco
- 2015–2018: Galatasaray
- 2019–2020: Crvena zvezda
- 2021–2022: Novi Beograd
- 2022–2023: Olympiacos
Medal record
Men's water polo
Representing Yugoslavia
Olympic Games
Gold medal – first place	1984 Los Angeles
Gold medal – first place	1988 Seoul
World Championship
Gold medal – first place	1986 Madrid
Gold medal – first place	1991 Perth
European Championship
Gold medal – first place	1991 Athens
Silver medal – second place	1985 Sofia
Silver medal – second place	1987 Strasbourg
Silver medal – second place	1989 Bonn
FINA World Cup
Gold medal – first place	1987 Thessaloniki
Gold medal – first place	1989 West-Berlin
Mediterranean Games
Silver medal – second place	1991 Athens
Universiade
Silver medal – second place	1985 Kobe
Bronze medal – third place	1987 Zagreb

Igor Milanović (Serbian Cyrillic: Игор Милановић; born 18 December 1965) is a Serbian professional water polo head coach and former player. He is considered one of the best water polo players of all time. Milanović had an illustrious professional career spanning twenty years.

== Biography ==
Milanović was born in Belgrade, Serbia, SFR Yugoslavia. He played a total of 349 games for the Yugoslav national team, scoring 540 goals. As a player, he won numerous trophies: he was a two-time Olympic gold medalist, a two-time World Championship winner, European Championship winner, a two-time FINA Cup winner, and a three-time Euroleague Championship winner. He was given the honour to carry the national flag of FR Yugoslavia at the opening ceremony of the 1996 Summer Olympics in Atlanta, becoming the 18th water polo player to be a flag bearer at the opening and closing ceremonies of the Olympics. On 13 May 2006, he was inducted into the International Swimming Hall of Fame in Fort Lauderdale.

In June 2009, Milanović was named the head coach of Partizan Raiffeisen after Dejan Udovičić stepped down. In 2011 as a head coach of Partizan Raiffeisen, he won the Euroleague Championship.

== Honours ==
=== As a coach ===
Partizan

- LEN Champions League: 2010–11
- LEN Super Cup: 2011
- Eurointer League: 2009–10, 2010–11
- Serbian Championship: 2009–10, 2010–11, 2011–12
- Serbian Cup: 2009–10, 2010–11, 2011–12
- Tom Hoad Cup: 2011

Pro Recco

- LEN Champions League: 2014–15
- Serie A: 2014–15
- Coppa Italia: 2014–15

Galatasaray

- Turkish Championship: 2016–17

Novi Beograd

- LEN Champions League runners-up: 2021–22
- Adriatic League: 2021–22
- Serbian Championship: 2021–22

Olympiacos

- Greek Championship: 2022–23
- Greek Cup: 2022–23

=== As a player ===
VK Partizan

- Yugoslavian Championship: 1983–84, 1986–87, 1987–88
- Yugoslavian Cup: 1981–82, 1984–85, 1986–87, 1987–88
- Mediterranean Cup: 1989

Mladost

- Yugoslavian Championship: 1989–90
- LEN Euroleague: 1989–90, 1990–91
- LEN SuperCup: 1990.
- Mediterranean Cup: 1991

VK Crvena zvezda

- Yugoslavian Championship: 1991–92

CN Catalunya

- Spanish Championship: 1992–93

Roma

- LEN Trophy: 1993–94

PVK Budva

- Serbia and Montenegro Championship: 1993–94

== See also ==
- Yugoslavia men's Olympic water polo team records and statistics
- Serbia and Montenegro men's Olympic water polo team records and statistics
- List of Olympic champions in men's water polo
- List of Olympic medalists in water polo (men)
- List of flag bearers for Serbia and Montenegro at the Olympics
- List of world champions in men's water polo
- List of World Aquatics Championships medalists in water polo
- List of members of the International Swimming Hall of Fame

Olympic Games
Preceded by Matija Ljubek (for Yugoslavia)	Flagbearer for FR Yugoslavia; Atlanta 1996	Succeeded by Vladimir Grbić
