= Dušan Popović (water polo) =

Serbian water polo player

Personal information
- Born: 15 June 1970
- Died: 18 November 2011 (aged 41)

Sport
- Sport: Water polo
Medal record
World Championship
Gold medal – first place	1991 Perth	Team competition
Bronze medal – third place	1998 Perth	Team competition
European Championship
Gold medal – first place	1991 Athens	Team competition
Mediterranean Games
Silver medal – second place	1991 Athens	Team competition

Dušan Popović (15 June 1970 – 18 November 2011) was a Serbian water polo player. In his career, he played for VK Partizan and Posillipo. He played for the Yugoslav and Serbian national teams.

== See also ==
- List of world champions in men's water polo
- List of World Aquatics Championships medalists in water polo
