= Major achievements in water polo by nation =

This article contains lists of achievements in major senior-level international water polo tournaments according to first-place, second-place and third-place results obtained by teams representing different nations. The objective is not to create combined medal tables; the focus is on listing the best positions achieved by teams in major international tournaments, ranking the nations according to the most podiums accomplished by teams of these nations.

== Results ==
For the making of these lists, results from following major international tournaments are consulted:

Governing body	Tournament	Edition		
Governing body	Tournament	First	Latest	Next
World Aquatics & IOC	Water polo at the Summer Olympics (quadrennially)	1900	2024	2028
World Aquatics	Water polo at the World Aquatics Championships (biennially)	1973	2025	2027
World Aquatics	World Aquatics Water Polo World Cup (annually)	1979	2026	2027
World Aquatics	World Aquatics Women's Water Polo World Cup (annually)	1979	2026	2027
World Aquatics	FINA Water Polo World League (annually)	2002	2022	Defunct

- FINA: Fédération internationale de natation
- IOC: International Olympic Committee

Medals for the demonstration events are NOT counted. Medals earned by athletes from defunct National Olympic Committees (NOCs) or historical teams are NOT merged with the results achieved by their immediate successor states. The International Olympic Committee (IOC) does NOT combine medals of these nations or teams.

The tables are pre-sorted by total number of first-place results, second-place results and third-place results, then most first-place results, second-place results, respectively. When equal ranks are given, nations are listed in alphabetical order.

=== Men and women ===
Last updated after the 2026 World Aquatics World Cup (As of 26 July 2026)
		Olympic Games		World Championships		World Cup		World League		Number of			
Rk.	Nation	Men	Women	Men	Women	Men	Women	Men	Women	1st place, gold medalist(s)	2nd place, silver medalist(s)	3rd place, bronze medalist(s)	Total
1	Italy	1st place, gold medalist(s)	1st place, gold medalist(s)	1st place, gold medalist(s)	1st place, gold medalist(s)	1st place, gold medalist(s)	2nd place, silver medalist(s)	1st place, gold medalist(s)	2nd place, silver medalist(s)	6	2	0	8
1	Spain	1st place, gold medalist(s)	1st place, gold medalist(s)	1st place, gold medalist(s)	1st place, gold medalist(s)	1st place, gold medalist(s)	2nd place, silver medalist(s)	2nd place, silver medalist(s)	1st place, gold medalist(s)	6	2	0	8
3	Hungary	1st place, gold medalist(s)	3rd place, bronze medalist(s)	1st place, gold medalist(s)	1st place, gold medalist(s)	1st place, gold medalist(s)	1st place, gold medalist(s)	1st place, gold medalist(s)	2nd place, silver medalist(s)	6	1	1	8
4	Greece	2nd place, silver medalist(s)	2nd place, silver medalist(s)	2nd place, silver medalist(s)	1st place, gold medalist(s)	1st place, gold medalist(s)	1st place, gold medalist(s)	3rd place, bronze medalist(s)	1st place, gold medalist(s)	4	3	1	8
5	Russia	2nd place, silver medalist(s)	3rd place, bronze medalist(s)	3rd place, bronze medalist(s)	3rd place, bronze medalist(s)	1st place, gold medalist(s)	2nd place, silver medalist(s)	1st place, gold medalist(s)	1st place, gold medalist(s)	3	2	3	8
6	United States	1st place, gold medalist(s)	1st place, gold medalist(s)		1st place, gold medalist(s)	1st place, gold medalist(s)	1st place, gold medalist(s)	2nd place, silver medalist(s)	1st place, gold medalist(s)	6	1	0	7
7	Australia		1st place, gold medalist(s)		1st place, gold medalist(s)	2nd place, silver medalist(s)	1st place, gold medalist(s)	3rd place, bronze medalist(s)	2nd place, silver medalist(s)	3	2	1	6
8	Netherlands	3rd place, bronze medalist(s)	1st place, gold medalist(s)		1st place, gold medalist(s)		1st place, gold medalist(s)		2nd place, silver medalist(s)	3	1	1	5
9	Serbia	1st place, gold medalist(s)		1st place, gold medalist(s)		1st place, gold medalist(s)		1st place, gold medalist(s)		4	0	0	4
10	Croatia	1st place, gold medalist(s)		1st place, gold medalist(s)		2nd place, silver medalist(s)		1st place, gold medalist(s)		3	1	0	4
10	Serbia and Montenegro^{*}	2nd place, silver medalist(s)		1st place, gold medalist(s)		1st place, gold medalist(s)		1st place, gold medalist(s)		3	1	0	4
12	Soviet Union^{*}	1st place, gold medalist(s)		1st place, gold medalist(s)		1st place, gold medalist(s)				3	0	0	3
12	Yugoslavia^{*}	1st place, gold medalist(s)		1st place, gold medalist(s)		1st place, gold medalist(s)				3	0	0	3
14	Canada				2nd place, silver medalist(s)		1st place, gold medalist(s)		2nd place, silver medalist(s)	1	2	0	3
15	China				2nd place, silver medalist(s)		3rd place, bronze medalist(s)		1st place, gold medalist(s)	1	1	1	3
16	West Germany^{*}	3rd place, bronze medalist(s)		3rd place, bronze medalist(s)		1st place, gold medalist(s)				1	0	2	3
17	Montenegro			2nd place, silver medalist(s)				1st place, gold medalist(s)		1	1	0	2
18	Germany	1st place, gold medalist(s)						3rd place, bronze medalist(s)		1	0	1	2
19	France	1st place, gold medalist(s)								1	0	0	1
19	Great Britain	1st place, gold medalist(s)								1	0	0	1
21	Belgium	2nd place, silver medalist(s)								0	1	0	1
21	Sweden	2nd place, silver medalist(s)								0	1	0	1
23	Brazil							3rd place, bronze medalist(s)		0	0	1	1
23	Cuba					3rd place, bronze medalist(s)				0	0	1	1
23	Unified Team^{*}	3rd place, bronze medalist(s)								0	0	1	1

^{*}Defunct National Olympic Committees (NOCs) or historical teams are shown in italic.

=== Men ===
Last updated after the 2026 World Aquatics Men's World Cup (As of 26 July 2026)
		Olympic Games	World Championships	World Cup	World League	Number of			
Rk.	Nation	Men	Men	Men	Men	1st place, gold medalist(s)	2nd place, silver medalist(s)	3rd place, bronze medalist(s)	Total
1	Hungary	1st place, gold medalist(s)	1st place, gold medalist(s)	1st place, gold medalist(s)	1st place, gold medalist(s)	4	0	0	4
1	Italy	1st place, gold medalist(s)	1st place, gold medalist(s)	1st place, gold medalist(s)	1st place, gold medalist(s)	4	0	0	4
1	Serbia	1st place, gold medalist(s)	1st place, gold medalist(s)	1st place, gold medalist(s)	1st place, gold medalist(s)	4	0	0	4
4	Croatia	1st place, gold medalist(s)	1st place, gold medalist(s)	2nd place, silver medalist(s)	1st place, gold medalist(s)	3	1	0	4
4	Serbia and Montenegro^{*}	2nd place, silver medalist(s)	1st place, gold medalist(s)	1st place, gold medalist(s)	1st place, gold medalist(s)	3	1	0	4
4	Spain	1st place, gold medalist(s)	1st place, gold medalist(s)	1st place, gold medalist(s)	2nd place, silver medalist(s)	3	1	0	4
7	Russia	2nd place, silver medalist(s)	3rd place, bronze medalist(s)	1st place, gold medalist(s)	1st place, gold medalist(s)	2	1	1	4
8	Greece	2nd place, silver medalist(s)	2nd place, silver medalist(s)	1st place, gold medalist(s)	3rd place, bronze medalist(s)	1	2	1	4
9	Soviet Union^{*}	1st place, gold medalist(s)	1st place, gold medalist(s)	1st place, gold medalist(s)		3	0	0	3
9	Yugoslavia^{*}	1st place, gold medalist(s)	1st place, gold medalist(s)	1st place, gold medalist(s)		3	0	0	3
11	United States	2nd place, silver medalist(s)		1st place, gold medalist(s)	2nd place, silver medalist(s)	1	2	0	3
12	West Germany^{*}	3rd place, bronze medalist(s)	3rd place, bronze medalist(s)	1st place, gold medalist(s)		1	0	2	3
13	Montenegro		2nd place, silver medalist(s)		1st place, gold medalist(s)	1	1	0	2
14	Germany	1st place, gold medalist(s)			3rd place, bronze medalist(s)	1	0	1	2
15	Australia			2nd place, silver medalist(s)	3rd place, bronze medalist(s)	0	1	1	2
16	France	1st place, gold medalist(s)				1	0	0	1
16	Great Britain	1st place, gold medalist(s)				1	0	0	1
18	Belgium	2nd place, silver medalist(s)				0	1	0	1
18	Sweden	2nd place, silver medalist(s)				0	1	0	1
20	Brazil				3rd place, bronze medalist(s)	0	0	1	1
20	Cuba			3rd place, bronze medalist(s)		0	0	1	1
20	Netherlands	3rd place, bronze medalist(s)				0	0	1	1
20	Unified Team^{*}	3rd place, bronze medalist(s)				0	0	1	1

^{*}Defunct National Olympic Committees (NOCs) or historical teams are shown in italic.

=== Women ===
Last updated after the 2026 World Aquatics Women's World Cup (As of 26 July 2026)
		Olympic Games	World Championships	World Cup	World League	Number of			
Rk.	Nation	Women	Women	Women	Women	1st place, gold medalist(s)	2nd place, silver medalist(s)	3rd place, bronze medalist(s)	Total
1	United States	1st place, gold medalist(s)	1st place, gold medalist(s)	1st place, gold medalist(s)	1st place, gold medalist(s)	4	0	0	4
2	Australia	1st place, gold medalist(s)	1st place, gold medalist(s)	1st place, gold medalist(s)	2nd place, silver medalist(s)	3	1	0	4
2	Greece	2nd place, silver medalist(s)	1st place, gold medalist(s)	1st place, gold medalist(s)	1st place, gold medalist(s)	3	1	0	4
2	Netherlands	1st place, gold medalist(s)	1st place, gold medalist(s)	1st place, gold medalist(s)	2nd place, silver medalist(s)	3	1	0	4
2	Spain	1st place, gold medalist(s)	1st place, gold medalist(s)	2nd place, silver medalist(s)	1st place, gold medalist(s)	3	1	0	4
6	Italy	1st place, gold medalist(s)	1st place, gold medalist(s)	2nd place, silver medalist(s)	2nd place, silver medalist(s)	2	2	0	4
7	Hungary	3rd place, bronze medalist(s)	1st place, gold medalist(s)	1st place, gold medalist(s)	2nd place, silver medalist(s)	2	1	1	4
8	Russia	3rd place, bronze medalist(s)	3rd place, bronze medalist(s)	2nd place, silver medalist(s)	1st place, gold medalist(s)	1	1	2	4
9	Canada		2nd place, silver medalist(s)	1st place, gold medalist(s)	2nd place, silver medalist(s)	1	2	0	3
10	China		2nd place, silver medalist(s)	3rd place, bronze medalist(s)	1st place, gold medalist(s)	1	1	1	3

== See also ==
- List of major achievements in sports by nation
- List of water polo world medalists
- FINA Water Polo World Rankings
