= Water polo at the 1987 Summer Universiade =

Water polo at the XIV Summer Universiade

Medalists
1st place, gold medalist(s)		Italy
2nd place, silver medalist(s)		Cuba
3rd place, bronze medalist(s)		Yugoslavia

Water polo events were contested at the 1987 Summer Universiade in Zagreb, Yugoslavia.

Event	Gold	Silver	Bronze
Men's	Italy (ITA)	Cuba (CUB)	Yugoslavia (YUG)
