= Bulgaria men's national water polo team =

Men's national water polo team representing Bulgaria

Bulgaria
- Association: Bulgarian Swimming Federation

Olympic Games
- Appearances: 2 (first in 1972)
- Best result: 11th place, 1972

World Championship
- Appearances: 3 (first in 1973)
- Best result: 8th place, 1978

World Cup
- Appearances: 2 (first in 1979)
- Best result: 8th place, 1979, 1981

The Bulgaria men's national water polo team is the representative for Bulgaria in international men's water polo.

== Results ==
=== Olympic Games ===
- 1972 — 11th place
- 1980 — 12th place

=== World Championship ===
- 1973 — 13th place
- 1975 — 12th place
- 1978 — 8th place

=== FINA Water Polo World Cup ===
- 1979 — 8th place
- 1981 — 8th place

=== Friendship Games ===
- 1984 — 5th place
