= Soviet Union men's national water polo team =

Soviet Union
- FINA code: URS
- Association: Федерация водного поло СССР
- Confederation: LEN (Europe)

Olympic Games (team statistics)
- Appearances: 9 (first in 1952)
- Best result: (gold) (1972, 1980)

World Championship
- Appearances: 6 (first in 1973)
- Best result: (gold) (1975, 1982)

World Cup
- Appearances: 6 (first in 1979)
- Best result: (gold) (1981, 1983)

The Soviet Union men's national water polo team represented the Soviet Union in international water polo competitions. After the dissolution of the Soviet Union, the Russian national water polo team became the successor of the Soviet team.

== Results ==
=== Olympic Games ===
- 1952 — 7th place
- 1956 — (bronze) Bronze medal
- 1960 — (silver) Silver medal
- 1964 — (bronze) Bronze medal
- 1968 — (silver) Silver medal
- 1972 — (gold) Gold medal
- 1976 — 8th place
- 1980 — (gold) Gold medal
- 1984 — Qualified but withdrew
- 1988 — (bronze) Bronze medal

=== World Championship ===
- 1973 – (silver) Silver medal
- 1975 – (gold) Gold medal
- 1978 – 4th place
- 1982 – (gold) Gold medal
- 1986 – (bronze) Bronze medal
- 1991 – 7th place

=== FINA World Cup ===
- 1979 – 4th place
- 1981 – (gold) Gold medal
- 1983 – (gold) Gold medal
- 1985 – Did not participate
- 1987 – (silver) Silver medal
- 1989 – 6th place
- 1991 – 5th place

== Player statistics ==
=== Most appearances ===
100+

#	Player	Matches	Position	Years	Nationality
1	Aleksei Barkalov	412	?		UKR

=== Top scorers ===
200+

#	Name	Goals	Average	Position	Years	Nationality
	Aleksei Barkalov	200+		?		UKR

== See also ==
- Soviet Union men's Olympic water polo team records and statistics
- List of Olympic champions in men's water polo
- List of men's Olympic water polo tournament records and statistics
- List of world champions in men's water polo
