= Yugoslavia men's national water polo team =

Men's national water polo team representing Yugoslavia

Yugoslavia
- FINA code: YUG
- Association: Water Polo Federation of Yugoslavia
- Confederation: LEN (Europe)
- Most caps: Igor Milanović (349)
- Top scorer(s): Milivoj Bebić (620)

Olympic Games (team statistics)
- Appearances: 12 (first in 1936)
- Best result: (gold) (1968, 1984, 1988)

World Championship
- Appearances: 6 (first in 1973)
- Best result: (gold) (1986, 1991)

World Cup
- Appearances: 6 (first in 1979)
- Best result: (gold) (1987, 1989)

European Championship
- Appearances: 17 (first in 1927)
- Best result: (gold) (1991)
Medal record
Men's water polo
Olympic Games
Gold medal – first place	1968 Mexico City	Team
Gold medal – first place	1984 Los Angeles	Team
Gold medal – first place	1988 Seoul	Team
Silver medal – second place	1952 Helsinki	Team
Silver medal – second place	1956 Melbourne	Team
Silver medal – second place	1964 Tokyo	Team
Silver medal – second place	1980 Moscow	Team
World Championship
Gold medal – first place	1986 Madrid	Team
Gold medal – first place	1991 Perth	Team
Bronze medal – third place	1973 Belgrade	Team
Bronze medal – third place	1978 Berlin	Team
European Championship
Gold medal – first place	1991 Athens
Silver medal – second place	1954 Turin
Silver medal – second place	1958 Budapest
Silver medal – second place	1962 Leipzig
Silver medal – second place	1977 Jönköping
Silver medal – second place	1985 Sofia
Silver medal – second place	1987 Strasbourg
Silver medal – second place	1989 Bonn
Bronze medal – third place	1950 Vienna
Bronze medal – third place	1966 Utrecht
Bronze medal – third place	1950 Vienna
Bronze medal – third place	1970 Barcelona
Bronze medal – third place	1974 Vienna
Fina World Cup
Gold medal – first place	1987 Thessaloniki
Gold medal – first place	1989 Berlin
Silver medal – second place	1981 Long Beach
Silver medal – second place	1991 Barcelona
Bronze medal – third place	1979 Belgrade/Rijeka
Mediterranean Games
Gold medal – first place	1959 Beirut	Team
Gold medal – first place	1967 Tunis	Team
Gold medal – first place	1971 Izmir	Team
Gold medal – first place	1979 Split	Team
Gold medal – first place	1983 Casablanca	Team
Silver medal – second place	1963 Naples	Team
Silver medal – second place	1975 Algiers	Team
Silver medal – second place	1991 Athens	Team

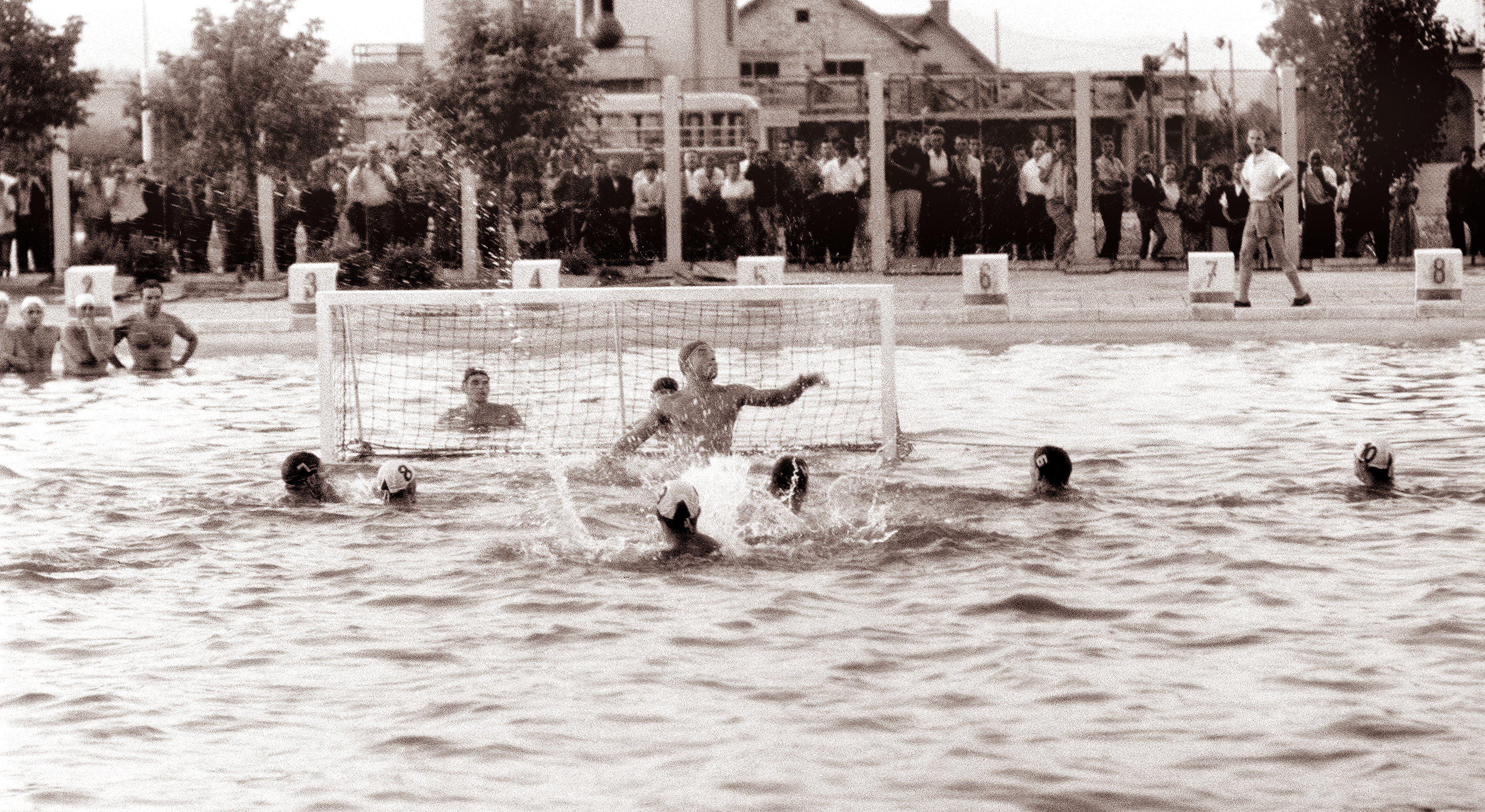
Yugoslavia men's national water polo team in 1962 vs. Soviet Union in Celje

Yugoslavia men's national water polo team was the national water polo team that represented the Kingdom of Serbs, Croats and Slovenes (1920–1929), the Kingdom of Yugoslavia (1929–1941) and the Federal Yugoslavia (1946–1992). They were one of strongest waterpolo teams in history of sport, having won 7 Olympic, 4 World Championship, 5 World Cup and 13 European Championship medals.

== Olympic Games record ==
Year	Round	Position	Pld	W	D	L	GF	GA	GD
(France) 1900	did not participate								
(United States) 1904	did not participate								
(United Kingdom) 1908	did not participate								
(Sweden) 1912	did not participate								
(Belgium) 1920	did not participate								
(France) 1924	did not participate								
(Netherlands) 1928	did not participate								
(United States) 1932	did not participate								
(Nazi Germany) 1936	Group stage	10th	3	1	0	2	11	8	+3
(United Kingdom) 1948	Group stage	9th	3	1	1	1	17	10	+7
(Finland) 1952	Runners-up	2nd place, silver medalist(s)	8	6	2	0	43	14	+29
(Australia) 1956	Runners-up	2nd place, silver medalist(s)	6	4	1	1	36	11	+25
(Italy) 1960	Fourth place	4th	7	5	0	2	27	14	+13
(Japan) 1964	Runners-up	2nd place, silver medalist(s)	7	6	1	0	41	10	+31
(Mexico) 1968	Champions	1st place, gold medalist(s)	9	7	1	1	86	35	+51
(West Germany) 1972	Final Round	5th	9	5	1	3	52	43	+9
(Canada) 1976	Final Round	5th	8	1	5	2	46	34	+8
(Soviet Union) 1980	Runners-up	2nd place, silver medalist(s)	8	5	2	1	58	34	+24
(United States) 1984	Champions	1st place, gold medalist(s)	7	6	1	0	72	49	+23
(South Korea) 1988	Champions	1st place, gold medalist(s)	7	6	0	1	83	55	+28
Total	Qualified: 16/24		114	73	17	24	839	538	+301

== World Championship record ==
Year	Round	Position	Pld	W	D	L	GF	GA	GD
(Socialist Federal Republic of Yugoslavia) 1973	Final Round	3rd place, bronze medalist(s)	10	6	1	3	58	44	+14
(Colombia) 1975	First round	13th	3	2	0	1	15	12	+3
(West Germany) 1978	Final Round	3rd place, bronze medalist(s)	11	7	0	4	64	39	+25
(Ecuador) 1982	Second round	7th	6	4	0	2	58	52	+6
(Spain) 1986	Champions	1st place, gold medalist(s)	7	5	2	0	73	56	+17
(Australia) 1991	Champions	1st place, gold medalist(s)	7	6	0	1	81	46	+35
Total	Qualified: 6/6		44	30	3	11	349	249	+100

== World Cup record ==
Year	Round	Position	Pld	W	D	L	GF	GA	GD
(Socialist Federal Republic of Yugoslavia) 1979	Final Round	3rd place, bronze medalist(s)	7	5	0	2	38	32	+6
(United States) 1981	Final Round	2nd place, silver medalist(s)	7	5	1	1	66	50	+16
(United States) 1983	did not participate								
(West Germany) 1985	Final Round	4th	7	3	2	2	54	49	+5
(Greece) 1987	Champions	1st place, gold medalist(s)	7	5	2	0	75	54	+21
(West Germany) 1989	Champions	1st place, gold medalist(s)	5	4	1	0	50	45	+15
(Spain) 1991	Final Round	2nd place, silver medalist(s)	5	4	0	1	35	28	+7
Total	Qualified: 6/7		38	26	6	6	318	258	+60

== European Championship record ==
Year	Round	Position	Pld	W	D	L	GF	GA	GD
(Hungary) 1926	did not participate								
(Italy) 1927	9th								
(France) 1931	did not participate								
(Germany) 1934	5th								
(United Kingdom) 1938	did not participate								
(Monaco) 1947	8th								
(Austria) 1950	3rd place, bronze medalist(s)								
(Italy) 1954	2nd place, silver medalist(s)								
(Hungary) 1958	2nd place, silver medalist(s)								
(East Germany) 1962	2nd place, silver medalist(s)								
(Netherlands) 1966	3rd place, bronze medalist(s)								
(Spain) 1970	3rd place, bronze medalist(s)								
(Austria) 1974	3rd place, bronze medalist(s)								
(Sweden) 1977	2nd place, silver medalist(s)								
(Socialist Federal Republic of Yugoslavia) 1981	4th								
(Italy) 1983	4th								
(Bulgaria) 1985	2nd place, silver medalist(s)								
(France) 1987	2nd place, silver medalist(s)								
(West Germany) 1989	2nd place, silver medalist(s)								
(Greece) 1991	1st place, gold medalist(s)								
Total	Qualified: 28/31								

== Player statistics ==
=== Most appearances ===
100+

#	Player	Matches	Position	Years	Nationality
1	Igor Milanović	349	?		SRB
2	Ratko Rudić	297	?		CRO
3	Zoran Roje	241	?		CRO
4	Mirko Sandić	235+	?		SRB
5	Milivoj Bebić	222	?		CRO
6	Goran Rađenović	200+	?		SRB
7	Dubravko Šimenc	200	?		CRO
8	Goran Sukno	121	?		CRO
9	Veselin Đuho	113	?		CRO
10	Andrija Popović	100+	?		MNE
11	Ozren Bonačić	96+	?		CRO

=== Top scorers ===
200+

#	Name	Goals	Average	Position	Years	Nationality
1	Milivoj Bebić	620	2.79	?		CRO
2	Igor Milanović	540	1.55	?		SRB
3	Mirko Sandić	250+		?		SRB

== See also ==
- Yugoslavia men's Olympic water polo team records and statistics
- List of Olympic champions in men's water polo
- List of men's Olympic water polo tournament records and statistics
- List of world champions in men's water polo
