= Water polo at the 1973 World Aquatics Championships – Men's tournament =

Tournament details
- Venue: Yugoslavia (in Belgrade host cities)
- Dates: 1 – September
- Teams: 16 (from 4 confederations)

Final positions
- Champions: Hungary (1st title)
- Runners-up: Soviet Union
- Third place: Yugoslavia
- Fourth place: Italy

Tournament statistics
- Matches played: 64
- Goals scored: 645 (10.08 per match)
- Top scorers: (Socialist Federal Republic of Yugoslavia) Siniša Belamarić (20 goals)

The 1973 Men's World Water Polo Championship was the first edition of the men's water polo tournament at the World Aquatics Championships, organised by the world governing body in aquatics, the FINA. The tournament was held from 1 to 9 September 1973, and was incorporated into the inaugural 1973 World Aquatics Championships in Belgrade, Yugoslavia.

== Participating teams ==
Americas	Asia	Europe	Oceania
Cuba; Mexico; United States	Israel	Bulgaria; Great Britain; Greece; Hungary; Italy; Netherlands; Romania; Soviet Union; Spain; West Germany; Yugoslavia	Australia

=== Groups formed ===
GROUP A

- Australia
- Great Britain
- Mexico
- Netherlands
- Soviet Union
- Yugoslavia

GROUP B

- Hungary
- Israel
- Italy
- Spain
- Romania

GROUP C

- Bulgaria
- Cuba
- Greece
- United States
- West Germany

== Preliminary round ==
Qualified for places 1–6 in a round robin group. (Group D)
Will play for places 7–12 in a round robin group. (Group E)
Will play for places 13–16 in a round robin group. (Group F)

=== Group A ===
Pos	Team	Pts	Pld	W	D	L	GF	GA	GD
1	Soviet Union	10	5	5	0	0	41	14	+27
2	Yugoslavia	8	5	4	0	1	35	22	+13
3	Netherlands	6	5	3	0	2	26	19	+7
4	Mexico	4	5	2	0	3	22	24	−2
5	Australia	2	5	1	0	4	18	29	−11
6	Great Britain	0	5	0	0	5	6	40	−34

- 1 September 1973

Netherlands	5 – 3	Mexico
Yugoslavia	9 – 0	Great Britain
Soviet Union	9 – 3	Australia

- 2 September 1973

Australia	4 – 1	Great Britain
Soviet Union	5 – 4	Netherlands
Yugoslavia	6 – 5	Mexico

- 3 September 1973

Mexico	5 – 3	Australia
Soviet Union	14 – 1	Great Britain
Yugoslavia	8 – 5	Netherlands

- 4 September 1973

Yugoslavia	10 – 6	Australia
Netherlands	8 – 1	Great Britain
Soviet Union	7 – 4	Mexico

- 5 September 1973

Mexico	5 – 3	Great Britain
Netherlands	4 – 2	Australia
Soviet Union	6 – 2	Yugoslavia

=== Group B ===
Pos	Team	Pts	Pld	W	D	L	GF	GA	GD
1	Hungary	8	4	4	0	0	36	11	+25
2	Italy	6	4	3	0	1	25	14	+11
3	Romania	4	4	2	0	2	30	18	+12
4	Spain	2	4	1	0	3	20	25	−5
5	Israel	0	4	0	0	4	6	49	−43

- 1 September 1973

Spain	11 – 3	Israel
Italy	5 – 4	Romania

- 2 September 1973

Romania	12 – 1	Israel
Hungary	7 – 3	Spain

- 3 September 1973

Italy	5 – 2	Spain
Hungary	15 – 0	Israel

- 4 September 1973

Hungary	6 – 4	Italy
Romania	10 – 4	Spain

- 5 September 1973

Italy	11 – 2	Israel
Hungary	8 – 4	Romania

=== Group C ===
Pos	Team	Pts	Pld	W	D	L	GF	GA	GD
1	Cuba	6	4	3	0	1	19	11	+8
2	United States	5	4	2	1	1	18	17	+1
3	West Germany	4	4	2	0	2	18	18	0
4	Greece	3	4	1	1	2	16	19	−3
5	Bulgaria	2	4	1	0	3	19	25	−6

- 1 September 1973

West Germany	1 – 1	Greece
United States	4 – 3	Cuba

- 2 September 1973

Cuba	7 – 2	Greece
Bulgaria	6 – 5	United States

- 3 September 1973

United States	3 – 3	West Germany
Cuba	3 – 0	Bulgaria

- 4 September 1973

Cuba	6 – 5	West Germany
Greece	8 – 5	Bulgaria

- 5 September 1973

United States	6 – 5	Greece
West Germany	9 – 8	Bulgaria

== Final round ==
=== 13th – 16th places (Group F) ===
Pos	Team	Pts	Pld	W	D	L	GF	GA	GD
13	Bulgaria	5	3	2	1	0	16	10	+6
14	Australia	4	3	2	0	1	18	5	+13
15	Great Britain	3	3	1	1	1	16	14	+2
16	Israel	0	3	0	0	3	9	30	−21

Preliminary round results apply.

- 6 September 1973

Bulgaria	3 – 2	Australia
Great Britain	10 – 5	Israel

- 7 September 1973

Bulgaria	8 – 3	Israel

- 8 September 1973

Bulgaria	5 – 5	Great Britain
Australia	12 – 1	Israel

=== 7th – 12th places (Group E) ===
Pos	Team	Pts	Pld	W	D	L	GF	GA	GD
7	Romania	9	5	4	1	0	35	21	+14
8	Netherlands	8	5	4	0	1	31	18	+13
9	Mexico	4	5	1	2	2	21	22	−1
10	Spain	4	5	2	0	3	22	29	−7
11	West Germany	3	5	1	1	3	19	27	−8
12	Greece	2	5	0	2	3	17	28	−11

Preliminary round results apply.

- 6 September 1973

Romania	11 – 6	Greece
Netherlands	5 – 4	Spain
West Germany	7 – 6	Mexico

- 7 September 1973

Spain	6 – 5	West Germany
Mexico	4 – 4	Greece
Romania	6 – 5	Netherlands

- 8 September 1973

Spain	5 – 4	Greece
Netherlands	9 – 3	West Germany
Romania	3 – 3	Mexico

- 9 September 1973

Romania	5 – 3	West Germany
Mexico	5 – 3	'Spain
Netherlands	7 – 2	Greece

=== 1st – 6th places (Group D) ===
Pos	Team	Pts	Pld	W	D	L	GF	GA	GD
1	Hungary	9	5	4	1	0	28	17	+11
2	Soviet Union	8	5	4	0	1	30	16	+14
3	Yugoslavia	5	5	2	1	2	23	22	+1
4	Italy	4	5	2	0	3	22	25	−3
5	United States	4	5	2	0	3	22	28	−6
6	Cuba	0	5	0	0	5	15	32	−17

Preliminary round results apply.

- 6 September 1973

Hungary	6 – 2	United States
Soviet Union	6 – 2	Italy
Yugoslavia	8 – 3	Cuba

- 7 September 1973

Yugoslavia	6 – 5	United States
Italy	6 – 3	Cuba
Hungary	5 – 4	Soviet Union

- 8 September 1973

United States	6 – 5	Italy
Hungary	3 – 3	Yugoslavia
Soviet Union	6 – 2	Cuba

- 9 September 1973

Hungary	8 – 4	Cuba
Italy	5 – 4	Yugoslavia
Soviet Union	8 – 5	United States

== Final ranking ==
RANK	TEAM
	Hungary
	Soviet Union
	Yugoslavia
4.	Italy
5.	United States
6.	Cuba
7.	Romania
8.	Netherlands
9.	Mexico
10.	Spain
11.	West Germany
12.	Greece
13.	Bulgaria
14.	Australia
15.	Great Britain
16.	Israel

1973 FINA Men's World champions

Hungary
First title

Team roster

Balazs Balla, Andrá Bodner, Gabor Csapo, Tibor Czervengak, Tamas Farago, István Görgenyi, Zoltán Kasas, Ferenc Konrad, Endre Molnar, László Sarosi, István Szivos Jr.
Head coach: Dezső Gyarmati

== Medalists ==
Gold	Silver	Bronze
Hungary Balazs Balla; András Bodnár; Gábor Csapó; Tibor Cservenyák; Tamás Faragó; István Görgényi; Zoltán Kásás; Ferenc Konrád; Endre Molnár; László Sárosi; István Szívós Jr. Head coach: Dezső Gyarmati	Soviet Union Anatoly Akimov; Aleksei Barkalov; Aleksandr Dreval; Andrey Frolov; Aleksandr Kabanov; Yuri Mityanin; Nuzgari Mshvenieradze; Leonid Osipov; Vitaly Romanchuk; Sergey Shevernyov; Vladimir Zhmudsky Head coach: Anatoly Blumental	Yugoslavia Siniša Belamarić; Ozren Bonačić; Milan Franković; Boško Lozica; Predrag Manojlović; Miloš Marković; Đorđe Perišić; Damir Polić; Ratko Rudić; Đuro Savinović; Nikola Stamenić Head coach: Ratko Rudić
