= 1979 FINA Men's Water Polo World Cup =

- League: FINA Water Polo World Cup
- Sport: Water polo

Super Final
- Finals champions: Hungary
- Runners-up: United States

FINA Water Polo World Cup seasons
- 1981 →

The 1979 FINA Men's Water Polo World Cup was the first edition of the event, organised by the world's governing body in aquatics, the International Swimming Federation (FINA). The event took place in Rijeka and in the Tašmajdan Swimming Pool in Belgrade, Yugoslavia.

Participating teams were the eight best teams from the last World Championships in Berlin, West Germany (1978). The teams played a round robin to decide the first ever winner of what would be a bi-annual event until 1999.

== Results Matrix ==
	HUN	USA	YUG	URS	FRG	ITA	ROU	BUL
Hungary		4 – 3	7 – 8	4 – 3	4 – 4	5 – 2	5 – 4	8 – 4
United States	3 – 4		4 – 6	6 – 3	4 – 2	9 – 4	8 – 4	6 – 3
Yugoslavia	8 – 7	6 – 4		1 – 5	3 – 4	7 – 6	6 – 4	7 – 2
Soviet Union	4 – 5	3 – 6	5 – 1		9 – 4	6 – 6	3 – 2	5 – 1
West Germany	4 – 4	2 – 4	4 – 3	4 – 9		5 – 4	4 – 4	6 – 3
Italy	2 – 5	4 – 9	6 – 7	6 – 6	4 – 5		8 – 8	10 – 5
Romania	4 – 5	4 – 8	4 – 6	2 – 3	4 – 4	8 – 8		3 – 3
Bulgaria	4 – 8	3 – 6	2 – 7	1 – 5	3 – 6	5 – 10	3 – 3	

== Final standings ==
	Team	Points	G	W	D	L	GF	GA	Diff
1.	Hungary	11	7	5	1	1	37	28	+9
2.	United States	10	7	5	0	2	40	26	+14
3.	Yugoslavia	10	7	5	0	2	38	32	+6
4.	Soviet Union	9	7	4	1	2	35	25	+10
5.	West Germany	8	7	3	2	2	29	31	–2
6.	Italy	4	7	1	2	4	40	45	–5
7.	Romania	3	7	0	3	4	30	38	–8
8.	Bulgaria	1	7	0	1	6	21	45	–24

== Final ranking ==
RANK	TEAM
	Hungary
	United States
	Yugoslavia
4.	Soviet Union
5.	West Germany
6.	Italy
7.	Romania
8.	Bulgaria

1979 Men's FINA World Cup winners

Hungary
First title
