= 1991 FINA Men's Water Polo World Cup =

- League: FINA Water Polo World Cup
- Sport: Water polo

Super Final
- Finals champions: United States
- Runners-up: Yugoslavia

FINA Water Polo World Cup seasons
- ← 1989 1993 →

The 1991 FINA Men's Water Polo World Cup was the seventh edition of the event, organised by the world's governing body in aquatics, the International Swimming Federation (FINA). The event took place in Barcelona, Spain as test event to 1992 Summer Olympics. Eight teams participated to decide the winner of what would be a bi-annual event until 1999.

== Teams ==
The top eight teams from the previous World Aquatic Championship have qualified.

Teams	Qualified as
Spain; Yugoslavia; Hungary; United States; Germany (Italy); Soviet Union; Australia; Romania	Host (2nd 1991 World Championship); 1st 1991 World Championship; 3rd 1991 World Championship; 4th 1991 World Championship; 5th 1991 World Championship; 6th 1991 World Championship; 7th 1991 World Championship; 8th 1991 World Championship; 9th 1991 World Championship - replace Italy

== Seeding ==
Following ranking of the 1991 World Championship

Pot 1	Pot 2	Pot 3	Pot 4
Yugoslavia (1); Spain (2) (H)	Hungary (3); United States (4)	Germany (5); Soviet Union (7)	Australia (8); Romania (9)

== Groups ==
Group A	Group B
Yugoslavia; United States; Soviet Union; Romania	Spain (H); Hungary; Germany; Australia

== Final ranking ==
RANK	TEAM
1st place, gold medalist(s)	United States
2nd place, silver medalist(s)	Yugoslavia
3rd place, bronze medalist(s)	Spain
4.	Hungary
5.	Soviet Union
6.	Romania
7.	Australia
8.	Germany

1991 Men's FINA World Cup winners

United States
First title
