= Cuba men's national water polo team =

Men's national water polo team representing Cuba

Cuba
- FINA code: CUB
- Confederation: UANA (Americas)

Olympic Games
- Appearances: 5 (first in 1968)
- Best result: 5th place (1980)

World Championship
- Appearances: 8 (first in 1973)
- Best result: 4th place (1975)

World Cup
- Appearances: 4 (first in 1981)
- Best result: (bronze) (1981)

Pan American Games
- Best result: (gold) (1991)

The Cuba men's national water polo team is the representative for Cuba in international men's water polo.

== Results ==
=== Olympic Games ===
- 1968 — 8th place
- 1972 — 9th place
- 1976 — 7th place
- 1980 — 5th place
- 1992 — 8th place

Water polo at the Friendship Games

=== Friendship Games ===
- 1984 — 3rd place

=== World Championship ===
- 1973 — 6th place
- 1975 — 4th place
- 1978 — 10th place
- 1982 — 5th place
- 1986 — 7th place
- 1991 — 11th place
- 1994 — 11th place
- 2005 — 12th place

=== FINA Water Polo World Cup ===
- 1981 — (bronze) Bronze medal
- 1983 — 8th place
- 1987 — 7th place
- 1993 — 8th place

== Notable players ==
- Iván Pérez (later Spain)
- Amaurys Pérez (later Italy)
- Juan Domínguez

== See also ==
- Cuba women's national water polo team
