= 1981 FINA Men's Water Polo World Cup =

- League: FINA Water Polo World Cup
- Sport: Water polo

Super Final

FINA Water Polo World Cup seasons
- ← 1979 1983 →

The 1981 FINA Men's Water Polo World Cup was the second edition of the event, organised by the world's governing body in aquatics, the International Swimming Federation (FINA). The event took place in Long Beach, United States. The eight participating teams played a round robin to decide the second ever winner of what would be a bi-annual event until 1999.

== Results matrix ==
	URS	YUG	CUB	USA	ESP	HUN	AUS	BUL
Soviet Union		10 – 6	8 – 3	6 – 5	5 – 5	7 – 5	15 – 6	15 – 5
Yugoslavia	6 – 10		11 – 6	7 – 7	10 – 9	11 – 10	6 – 4	15 – 4
Cuba	3 – 8	6 – 11		10 – 9	7 – 7	9 – 8	9 – 7	7 – 6
United States	5 – 6	7 – 7	9 – 10		4 – 4	12 – 7	9 – 5	11 – 3
Spain	5 – 5	9 – 10	7 – 7	4 – 4		6 – 11	7 – 3	13 – 7
Hungary	5 – 7	10 – 11	8 – 9	7 – 12	11 – 6		12 – 7	11 – 4
Australia	6 – 15	4 – 6	7 – 9	5 – 9	3 – 7	7 – 12		15 – 8
Bulgaria	5 – 15	4 – 15	6 – 7	3 – 11	7 – 13	4 – 11	8 – 15	

== Final standings ==
	Team	Points	G	W	D	L	GF	GA	Diff
1.	Soviet Union	13	7	6	1	0	66	35	+31
2.	Yugoslavia	11	7	5	1	1	66	50	+16
3.	Cuba	9	7	4	1	2	51	56	–5
4.	United States	8	7	3	2	2	57	42	+15
5.	Spain	7	7	2	3	2	51	47	+4
6.	Hungary	6	7	3	0	4	64	56	+8
7.	Australia	2	7	1	0	6	47	66	–19
8.	Bulgaria	0	7	0	0	7	37	87	–50

== Final ranking ==
RANK	TEAM
	Soviet Union
	Yugoslavia
	Cuba
4.	United States
5.	Spain
6.	Hungary
7.	Australia
8.	Bulgaria

1981 Men's FINA World Cup winners

Soviet Union
First title
