= Water polo at the 1991 World Aquatics Championships – Men's tournament =

Tournament details
- Venue(s): Australia (in Perth host cities)
- Dates: 3 – 13 January
- Teams: 16 (from 5 confederations)

Final positions
- Champions: Yugoslavia (2nd title)
- Runner-up: Spain
- Third place: Hungary
- Fourth place: United States

Tournament statistics
- Matches played: 56
- Goals scored: 1,023 (18.27 per match)

== Participating teams ==
Africa	Americas	Asia	Europe	Oceania
Egypt	Canada; Cuba; United States	China	France; Germany; Greece; Hungary; Italy; Romania; Soviet Union; Spain; Yugoslavia	Australia; New Zealand

=== Groups formed ===
Group A

- Greece
- Italy
- New Zealand
- Soviet Union

Group B

- China
- Romania
- Spain
- Yugoslavia

Group C

- Australia
- Canada
- France
- United States

Group D

- Cuba
- Egypt
- Germany
- Hungary

== Preliminary round ==
Qualified for places 1–8, separated in 2 round robin groups of 4 teams each. (Group E and F)
Qualified for places 9–16, separated in 2 round robin groups of 4 teams each. (Group G and H)

=== Group A ===
Pos	Team	Pts	Pld	W	D	L	GF	GA	GD
1	Italy	6	3	3	0	0	38	16	+22
2	Soviet Union	4	3	2	0	1	37	16	+21
3	Greece	2	3	1	0	2	31	29	+2
4	New Zealand	0	3	0	0	3	5	50	−45

- 5 January 1991

Greece	14 – 2	New Zealand
Italy	7 – 5	Soviet Union

- 6 January 1991

Italy	19 – 1	New Zealand
Soviet Union	15 – 7	Greece

- 7 January 1991

Soviet Union	17 – 2	New Zealand
Italy	12 – 10	Greece

=== Group B ===
Pos	Team	Pts	Pld	W	D	L	GF	GA	GD
1	Yugoslavia	6	3	3	0	0	49	18	+31
2	Spain	4	3	2	0	1	36	27	+9
3	Romania	2	3	1	0	2	29	32	−3
4	China	0	3	0	0	3	22	59	−37

- 5 January 1991

Yugoslavia	8 – 3	Spain
Romania	13 – 4	China

- 6 January 1991

Yugoslavia	16 – 6	Romania
Spain	21 – 9	China

- 7 January 1991

Yugoslavia	25 – 9	China
Spain	12 – 10	Romania

=== Group C ===
Pos	Team	Pts	Pld	W	D	L	GF	GA	GD
1	United States	6	3	3	0	0	30	13	+17
2	Australia	4	3	2	0	1	27	19	+8
3	France	2	3	1	0	2	16	29	−13
4	Canada	0	3	0	0	3	21	33	−12

- 5 January 1991

United States	11 – 5	Canada
Australia	9 – 4	France

- 6 January 1991

United States	13 – 3	France
Australia	13 – 9	Canada

- 7 January 1991

France	9 – 7	Canada
United States	6 – 5	Australia

=== Group D ===
Pos	Team	Pts	Pld	W	D	L	GF	GA	GD
1	Hungary	6	3	3	0	0	41	21	+20
2	Germany	4	3	2	0	1	39	23	+16
3	Cuba	2	3	1	0	2	33	31	+2
4	Egypt	0	3	0	0	3	21	59	−38

- 5 January 1991

Hungary	12 – 9	Cuba
Germany	22 – 7	Egypt

- 6 January 1991

Hungary	20 – 4	Egypt
Germany	9 – 7	Cuba

- 7 January 1991

Cuba	17 – 10	Egypt
Hungary	9 – 8	Germany

== Second round ==
Qualified for places 1–4 in a Knockout system with 3rd place game
Will play for places 5–8 in a round robin group. (Group J)
Will play for places 9–12 in a round robin group. (Group K)
Will play for places 13–16 in a round robin group (Group L)

=== Group E ===
Pos	Team	Pts	Pld	W	D	L	GF	GA	GD
1	Yugoslavia	4	3	2	0	1	25	18	+7
2	Spain	4	3	2	0	1	18	19	−1
3	Italy	2	3	1	0	2	20	22	−2
4	Soviet Union	2	3	1	0	2	18	22	−4

Preliminary round results apply.

- 9 January 1991

Soviet Union	9 – 8	Yugoslavia
Spain	8 – 7	Italy

- 10 January 1991

Spain	7 – 4	Soviet Union
Yugoslavia	9 – 6	Italy

=== Group F ===
Pos	Team	Pts	Pld	W	D	L	GF	GA	GD
1	Hungary	5	3	2	1	0	30	28	+2
2	United States	3	3	1	1	1	22	23	−1
3	Australia	2	3	1	0	2	25	25	0
4	Germany	2	3	1	0	2	24	25	−1

Preliminary round results apply.

- 9 January 1991

Hungary	12 – 11	Australia
Germany	9 – 7	United States

- 10 January 1991

Australia	9 – 7	Germany
Hungary	9 – 9	United States

=== Group G ===
Pos	Team	Pts	Pld	W	D	L	GF	GA	GD
1	Romania	6	3	3	0	0	35	14	+21
2	Greece	4	3	2	0	1	30	15	+15
3	China	2	3	1	0	2	25	31	−6
4	New Zealand	0	3	0	0	3	14	44	−30

Preliminary round results apply.

- 9 January 1991

Romania	15 – 5	New Zealand
Greece	11 – 6	China

- 10 January 1991

China	15 – 7	New Zealand
Romania	7 – 5	Greece

=== Group H ===
Pos	Team	Pts	Pld	W	D	L	GF	GA	GD
1	Cuba	6	3	3	0	0	37	23	+14
2	France	4	3	2	0	1	30	27	+3
3	Canada	2	3	1	0	2	20	25	−5
4	Egypt	0	3	0	0	3	26	38	−12

Preliminary round results apply.

- January 9, 1991

Canada	6 – 5	Egypt
Cuba	9 – 6	France

- January 10, 1991

Cuba	11 – 7	Canada
France	15 – 11	Egypt

== Final round ==
=== 13th – 16th places (Group L) ===
Pos	Team	Pts	Pld	W	D	L	GF	GA	GD
13	Canada	6	3	3	0	0	33	18	+15
14	China	4	3	2	0	1	34	31	+3
15	Egypt	2	3	1	0	2	30	19	+11
16	New Zealand	0	3	0	0	3	14	43	−29

Results of previous rounds apply.

- 12 January 1991

Canada	14 – 6	New Zealand
China	12 – 11	Egypt

- 13 January 1991

Egypt	14 – 1	New Zealand
Canada	13 – 7	China

=== 9th – 12th places (Group K) ===
Pos	Team	Pts	Pld	W	D	L	GF	GA	GD
9	Romania	6	3	3	0	0	27	21	+6
10	Greece	4	3	2	0	1	26	22	+4
11	Cuba	2	3	1	0	2	25	26	−1
12	France	0	3	0	0	3	21	30	−9

Results of previous rounds apply.

- 12 January 1991

Greece	9 – 8	Cuba
Romania	9 – 8	France

- 13 January 1991

Greece	12 – 7	France
Romania	11 – 8	Cuba

=== 5th – 8th places (Group J) ===
Pos	Team	Pts	Pld	W	D	L	GF	GA	GD
5	Germany	4	3	2	0	1	21	20	+1
6	Italy	4	3	2	0	1	22	20	+2
7	Soviet Union	2	3	1	0	2	18	20	−2
8	Australia	2	3	1	0	2	23	24	−1

Results of previous rounds apply.

- 12 January 1991

Soviet Union	9 – 7	Australia
Germany	8 – 7	Italy

- 13 January 1991

Italy	8 – 7	Australia
Germany	6 – 4	Soviet Union

== Semi finals ==
- 12 January 1991

Hungary	8 – 9	Spain
United States	6 – 7	Yugoslavia

== Finals ==
- 13 January 1991 – Bronze Medal Match

Hungary	13 – 12	United States

- 13 January 1991 – Gold Medal Match

Yugoslavia	8 – 7	Spain

== Final ranking ==
RANK	TEAM
	Yugoslavia
	Spain
	Hungary
4.	United States
5.	Germany
6.	Italy
7.	Soviet Union
8.	Australia
9.	Romania
10.	Greece
11.	Cuba
12.	France
13.	Canada
14.	China
15.	Egypt
16.	New Zealand

1991 FINA Men's World champions

Yugoslavia
Second title

Team Roster

Mislav Bezmalinović, Perica Bukić, Viktor Jelenić, Igor Milanović, Vitomir Padovan, Dušan Popović, Renco Posinković, Goran Rađenović, Dubravko Šimenc, Aleksandar Šoštar, Vaso Subotić, Anto Vasović, Mirko Vičević.
Head coach: Nikola Stamenić

== Medalists ==
Gold	Silver	Bronze
Yugoslavia Mislav Bezmalinović; Perica Bukić; Viktor Jelenić; Igor Milanović; Vitomir Padovan; Dušan Popović; Renco Posinković; Goran Rađenović; Dubravko Šimenc; Aleksandar Šoštar; Vaso Subotić; Anto Vasović; Mirko Vičević Head coach: Nikola Stamenić	Spain Daniel Ballart; Manuel Estiarte (c); Pedro García; Salvador Gómez; Marco Antonio González; Rubén Michavila; Miki Oca; Josep Picó; Jesús Rollán; Ricardo Sánchez; Jordi Sans; Manuel Silvestre; Juan Valls Head coach: Dragan Matutinović	Hungary Tibor Benedek; István Dóczi; Péter Kuna; Csaba Mészáros; Gábor Nemes; Imre Péter; Zsolt Petőváry; Gábor Schmiedt; Tibor Sprok; Frank Tóth; Imre Tóth; László Tóth; Balázs Vincze Head coach: János Konrád
