= 1985 FINA Men's Water Polo World Cup =

- League: FINA Water Polo World Cup
- Sport: Water polo

Super Final
- Finals champions: West Germany
- Runners-up: United States

FINA Water Polo World Cup seasons
- ← 1983 1987 →

The 1985 FINA Men's Water Polo World Cup was the fourth edition of the event, organised by the world's governing body in aquatics, the International Swimming Federation (FINA). The event took place in Duisburg, West Germany and was contested at the Schwimmstadion pool. The eight participating teams, the first eight of the 1984 Summer Olympics, played a round robin to decide the winner of what would be a bi-annual event until 1999.

== Results Matrix ==
	FRG	USA	ESP	YUG	ITA	NED	AUS	GRE
West Germany		8 – 8	5 – 4	7 – 6	10 – 3	10 – 8	5 – 4	12 – 7
United States	8 – 8		8 – 9	7 – 7	9 – 7	8 – 5	8 – 7	9 – 4
Spain	4 – 5	9 – 8		11 – 10	6 – 7	7 – 7	10 – 6	11 – 5
Yugoslavia	6 – 7	7 – 7	10 – 11		10 – 7	7 – 7	6 – 3	8 – 7
Italy	3 – 10	7 – 9	7 – 6	7 – 10		10 – 7	6 – 3	11 – 5
Netherlands	8 – 10	5 – 8	7 – 7	7 – 7	7 – 10		6 – 8	12 – 11
Australia	4 – 5	7 – 8	6 – 10	3 – 6	3 – 6	8 – 6		8 – 8
Greece	7 – 12	4 – 9	5 – 11	7 – 8	5 – 11	11 – 12	8 – 8	

== Final standings ==
	Team	Points	G	W	D	L	GF	GA	Diff
1.	West Germany	13	7	6	1	0	57	40	+17
2.	United States	10	7	4	2	1	57	47	+10
3.	Spain	9	7	4	1	2	58	48	+10
4.	Yugoslavia	8	7	3	2	2	54	49	+5
5.	Italy	8	7	4	0	3	51	50	+1
6.	Netherlands	4	7	1	2	4	52	61	–9
7.	Australia	3	7	1	1	5	39	49	–10
8.	Greece	1	7	0	1	6	47	71	–24

== Final ranking ==
RANK	TEAM
	West Germany
	United States
	Spain
4.	Yugoslavia
5.	Italy
6.	Netherlands
7.	Australia
8.	Greece

1985 Men's FINA World Cup winners

West Germany
First title
