= 1983 FINA Men's Water Polo World Cup =

- League: FINA Water Polo World Cup
- Sport: Water polo

Super Final

FINA Water Polo World Cup seasons
- ← 1981 1985 →

The 1983 FINA Men's Water Polo World Cup was the third edition of the event, organised by the world's governing body in aquatics, the International Swimming Federation (FINA). The event took place in Malibu, United States as a test event to the 1984 Summer Olympics. The eight participating teams played a round robin to decide the winner of what would be a bi-annual event until 1999.

== Results Matrix ==
	URS	FRG	ITA	USA	ESP	NED	HUN	CUB
Soviet Union		6 – 5	6 – 6	7 – 6	7 – 8	11 – 7	10 – 6	13 – 9
West Germany	5 – 6		9 – 8	7 – 3	8 – 6	9 – 9	8 – 8	11 – 7
Italy	6 – 6	8 – 9		6 – 6	8 – 5	6 – 6	9 – 7	8 – 7
United States	6 – 7	3 – 7	6 – 6		5 – 5	7 – 6	9 – 9	11 – 8
Spain	8 – 7	6 – 8	5 – 8	5 – 5		8 – 9	9 – 8	11 – 11
Netherlands	7 – 11	9 – 9	6 – 6	6 – 7	9 – 8		11 – 11	10 – 12
Hungary	6 – 10	8 – 8	7 – 9	9 – 9	8 – 9	11 – 11		8 – 8
Cuba	9 – 13	7 – 11	7 – 8	8 – 11	11 – 11	12 – 10	8 – 8	

== Final standings ==
	Team	Points	G	W	D	L	GF	GA	Diff
1.	Soviet Union	11	7	5	1	1	60	47	+13
2.	West Germany	10	7	4	2	1	57	47	+10
3.	Italy	9	7	3	3	1	51	46	+5
4.	United States	7	7	2	3	2	47	48	–1
5.	Spain	6	7	2	2	3	52	56	–4
6.	Netherlands	5	7	1	3	3	58	64	–6
7.	Hungary	4	7	0	4	3	57	64	–7
8.	Cuba	4	7	1	2	4	62	72	–10

== Final ranking ==
RANK	TEAM
	Soviet Union
	West Germany
	Italy
4.	United States
5.	Spain
6.	Netherlands
7.	Hungary
8.	Cuba

1983 Men's FINA World Cup winners

Soviet Union
Second title
