= 1989 FINA Men's Water Polo World Cup =

1991 FINA Men's Water Polo World Cup
- League: FINA Water Polo World Cup
- Sport: Water polo

Super Final

FINA Water Polo World Cup seasons
- ← 1987 1991 →

The 1989 FINA Men's Water Polo World Cup was the sixth edition of the event, organised by the world's governing body in aquatics, the International Swimming Federation (FINA). The event took place in Berlin. Eight teams participated to decide the winner of what would be a bi-annual event until 1999.

== Final ranking ==
| RANK | TEAM |
|---|---|
| 1st place, gold medalist(s) | Yugoslavia |
| 2nd place, silver medalist(s) | Italy |
| 3rd place, bronze medalist(s) | Hungary |
| 4. | Spain |
| 5. | West Germany |
| 6. | Soviet Union |
| 7. | Australia |
| 8. | United States |

1989 Men's FINA World Cup winners

Yugoslavia
Second title
