= World Aquatics Water Polo World Cup =

International water polo competition

World Aquatics Men's Water Polo World Cup
- Sport: Water polo
- Founded: 1979
- Continent: All (International)
- Most recent champion: Greece (1st title)
- Most titles: Serbia (5 titles)

The World Aquatics Men's Water Polo World Cup is an annual international water polo competition contested by men's national water polo teams that are members of the World Aquatics, the aquatic sports' global governing body. It was established in 1979, initially taking place on odd years. From 2002 to 2018 it was held every four years, in the even-year between Olympics.

== Format change ==
From 2023 on, the tournament replacing the FINA Water Polo World League and changed format.

== Editions ==
#	Year	Host	Champion	Runner-up	Third place
1	1979	(Socialist Federal Republic of Yugoslavia); Belgrade & Rijeka, Yugoslavia	Hungary	United States	Yugoslavia
2	1981	(United States); Long Beach, USA	Soviet Union	Yugoslavia	Cuba
3	1983	(United States); Malibu, USA	Soviet Union	West Germany	Italy
4	1985	Duisburg, West Germany	West Germany	United States	Spain
5	1987	Thessaloniki, Greece	Yugoslavia	Soviet Union	West Germany
6	1989	West Berlin, West Germany	Yugoslavia	Italy	Hungary
7	1991	Barcelona, Spain	United States	Yugoslavia	Spain
8	1993	Athens, Greece	Italy	Hungary	Australia
9	1995	(United States); Atlanta, USA	Hungary	Italy	Russia
10	1997	Athens, Greece	United States	Greece	Hungary
11	1999	Sydney, Australia	Hungary	Italy	Spain
12	2002	(Serbia and Montenegro); Belgrade, Yugoslavia	Russia	Hungary	FR Yugoslavia
13	2006	Budapest, Hungary	Serbia and Montenegro	Hungary	Spain
14	2010	Oradea, Romania	Serbia	Croatia	Spain
15	2014	Almaty, Kazakhstan	Serbia	Hungary	Croatia
16	2018	Berlin, Germany	Hungary	Australia	Serbia
New Format (Division 1 + Division 2)
17	2023	(United States); Los Angeles, USA	Spain	Italy	United States
18	2025	Podgorica, Montenegro	Spain	Greece	Hungary
19	2026	Sydney, Australia	Greece	Hungary	Italy
20	2027	Athens, Greece			

== Medal table ==
Rank	Nation	Gold	Silver	Bronze	Total
1	Serbia (Note: Yugoslavia/FR Yugoslavia/Serbia and Montenegro medals included in Serbia row.)	5	2	3	10
2	Hungary	4	5	3	12
3	Russia (Note: Soviet Union medals included in Russia row.)	3	1	1	5
4	United States	2	2	1	5
5	Spain	2	0	5	7
6	Italy	1	4	2	7
7	Greece	1	2	0	3
8	Germany (Note: West Germany medals included in Germany row.)	1	1	1	3
9	Australia	0	1	1	2
9	Croatia	0	1	1	2
11	Cuba	0	0	1	1
Totals (11 entries)		19	19	19	57

== Participation details ==
Legend

- 1st – Champions
- 2nd – Runners-up
- 3rd – Third place
- 4th – Fourth place
- – Disqualified
- – Hosts
- = – More than one team tied for that rank
- Q – Qualified for forthcoming tournament
- ^{†} – Defunct team

Africa – CANA (1 team)
Team	1979	1981	1983	1985	1987	1989	1991	1993	1995	1997	1999	2002	2006	2010	2014	2018	2023	2025	2026	2027	Years
South Africa															8th	8th					2
Americas – ASUA (2 teams)
Cuba		3rd	8th		7th			8th													4
United States	2nd	4th	4th	2nd	4th	8th	1st	4th	4th	1st	6th	7th		4th	4th	6th	3rd				16
China														7th							1
Iran														8th							1
Japan																7th		8th			2
Kazakhstan	Part of Soviet Union														6th						1
Europe – LEN (15 teams)
Bulgaria	8th	8th																			2
Croatia	Part of Yugoslavia								8th	8th		8th	4th	2nd	3rd	5th		4th	7th		9
Georgia																			8th		1
Germany; West Germany^{†}	5th		2nd	1st	3rd	5th	8th	6th								4th	8th	7th			10
Greece				8th	8th			7th	6th	2nd	7th	5th	7th				5th	2nd	1st	Q	12
Hungary	1st	6th	7th			3rd	4th	2nd	1st	3rd	1st	2nd	2nd		2nd	1st	4th	3rd	2nd		16
Italy	6th		3rd	5th	5th	2nd		1st	2nd	5th	2nd	4th	5th				2nd		3rd		13
Montenegro	Part of Yugoslavia							Part of SCG / FRY							7th			5th	6th		3
Netherlands			6th	6th					7th									6th			4
Romania	7th						6th						6th	5th			6th				5
Russia	Part of Soviet Union							5th	3rd	4th	4th	1st	8th								6
Serbia	Part of Yugoslavia							Part of SCG / FRY						1st	1st	3rd	7th				4
Serbia and Montenegro^{†} FR Yugoslavia^{†}	Part of Yugoslavia									7th	5th	3rd	1st	Defunct							4
Soviet Union^{†}	4th	1st	1st		2nd	6th	5th	Defunct													6
Spain		5th	5th	3rd	6th	4th	3rd		5th	6th	3rd	6th	3rd	3rd			1st	1st	5th		15
Yugoslavia^{†}	3rd	2nd		4th	1st	1st	2nd	Defunct													6
Oceania – OSA (1 team)
Australia		7th		7th		7th	7th	3rd			8th			6th	5th	2nd			4th		10
Total teams	8	8	8	8	8	8	8	8	8	8	8	8	8	8	8	8	8	8	8	8	

== See also ==
- FINA Women's Water Polo World Cup
- List of water polo world medalists
- Major achievements in water polo by nation
