= 1987 FINA Men's Water Polo World Cup =

- League: FINA Water Polo World Cup
- Sport: Water polo

Super Final

FINA Water Polo World Cup seasons
- ← 1985 1989 →

The 1987 FINA Men's Water Polo World Cup was the fifth edition of the event, organised by the world's governing body in aquatics, the International Swimming Federation (FINA). The event took place in Thessalonica, Greece. Eight teams participated to decide the winner of what would be a bi-annual event until 1999.

== Final ranking ==
RANK	TEAM
1st place, gold medalist(s)	Yugoslavia
2nd place, silver medalist(s)	Soviet Union
3rd place, bronze medalist(s)	West Germany
4.	United States
5.	Italy
6.	Spain
7.	Cuba
8.	Greece

1987 Men's FINA World Cup winners

Yugoslavia
First title
