= Water polo at the Summer World University Games =

- Events: 2 (men: 1; women: 1)

Games
- 1959; 1960; 1961; 1962; 1963; 1964; 1965; 1966; 1967; 1968; 1970; 1970; 1973; 1972; 1975; 1975; 1977; 1978; 1979; 1981; 1983; 1985; 1987; 1989; 1991; 1993; 1995; 1997; 1999; 2001; 2003; 2005; 2007; 2009; 2011; 2013; 2015; 2017; 2019; 2021; 2025

Water polo has been part of the Universiade program since the first games, in 1959. A women's water polo tournament was introduced for the 2009 Summer Universiade. Water polo was not included in 1975 and 1989.

== Medal winners ==
Men

Year	Gold	Silver	Bronze
1959	Yugoslavia	Hungary	Italy
1961	Yugoslavia	Soviet Union	Hungary
1963	Hungary	Soviet Union	Brazil
1965	Hungary	Soviet Union	Romania
1967	Japan	United States	Italy
1970	Soviet Union	Italy	Hungary
1973	Soviet Union	Cuba	United States
1977	Romania	Hungary	Italy
1979	United States	Soviet Union	Yugoslavia
1981	Cuba	United States	Romania
1983	Soviet Union	United States	Cuba
1985	Soviet Union	Yugoslavia	Cuba
1987	Italy	Cuba	Yugoslavia
1991	United States	China	Italy
1993	United States	Hungary	Italy
1995	Yugoslavia	Hungary	Australia
1997	Italy	Hungary	Australia
1999	Spain	Italy	Hungary
2001	Italy	Russia	Hungary
2003	Hungary	Serbia and Montenegro	Australia
2005	Serbia and Montenegro	Hungary	Turkey
2007	Montenegro	Italy	Hungary
2009	Australia	Croatia	Serbia
2011	Serbia	Russia	North Macedonia
2013	Hungary	Russia	Serbia
2015	Hungary	Italy	United States
2017	Serbia	Russia	Italy
2019	Italy	United States	Hungary
2021	Italy	Hungary	Georgia
2025	Italy	United States	Germany

=== Men's results ===
Last updated after the 2021 Summer World University Games

Team	(Italy) 1959	(Bulgaria) 1961	(Brazil) 1963	(Hungary) 1965	(Japan) 1967	(Italy) 1970	(Soviet Union) 1973	(Bulgaria) 1977	(Mexico) 1979	(Romania) 1981	(Canada) 1983	(Japan) 1985	(Socialist Federal Republic of Yugoslavia) 1987	(United Kingdom) 1991	(United States) 1993	(Japan) 1995	(Italy) 1997	(Spain) 1999	(China) 2001	(South Korea) 2003	(Turkey) 2005	(Thailand) 2007	(Serbia) 2009	(China) 2011	(Russia) 2013	(South Korea) 2015	(Taiwan) 2017	(Italy) 2019	(China) 2021
Yugoslavia	1st	1st	-	-	-	-	7th	4th	3rd	-	5th	2nd	3rd	-	-	1st	8th	6th	4th	-	-	-	-	-	-	-	-	-	-
Hungary	2nd	3rd	1st	1st	-	3rd	5th	2nd	6th	6th	8th	8th	7th	-	2nd	2nd	2nd	3rd	3rd	1st			-				-		
Italy	3rd	3rd	-	-	3rd	2nd	4th	3rd	7th	5th	5th	5th	1st	3rd	3rd	8th	1st	2nd	1st	4th	-				-				-
Netherlands	4th	5th	-	6th	5th	5th	11th	-	8th	-	8th	-	-	-	-	6th	11th		7th		-				-				-
West Germany	5th	-	-	8th	4th	6th	6th	10th	-	-	-	-	-	-	-	-	-	-	-		-				-				-
Romania	6th	4th	-	3rd	-	7th	-	1st	4th	3rd	4th	5th	-	-	12th	-	-				-				-				-
Ireland	7th	-	-	-	-	-	-	-	-	-	-	-	-	-	-	-	-		-						-				-
Soviet Union	-	2nd	2nd	2nd	-	1st	1st	7th	2nd	4th	1st	1st	4th				-				-				-				-
Bulgaria	-	6th	-	4th	-	-	9th	-	-	-	-		-				-				-				-				-
Japan	-	7th	4th	7th	1st	-	-	13th	12th	10th	9th	6th	8th	9th	8th	10th	9th	-	10th	5th	-				-				-
Indonesia	-	8th	-	-	-	-	-	-	-	-	-	-	-	-	-	-	-	-	-		-		-	-	-	-	-	-	-
Brazil	-	-	3rd	-	-	-	-	12th	11th	10th	-	-	-	-	-	13th	10th	15th	8th		-				-				-
South Africa	-	-	5th	-	-	-	-	-	-	-	-	-	-	-	13th	-	-	-	14th		-				-				-
Czechoslovakia	-	-	-	5th	-	-	10th	-	-	-	-	-	-	6th			-	-			-				-				-
Austria	-	-	-	9th	-	-	-	-	-	-	-		-	-			-				-				-				-
Great Britain	-	-	-	10th	-	8th	12th	-	13th	-	-	-	12th	10th			-				-				-				-
United States	-	-	-	-	2nd	-	3rd	6th	1st	2nd	2nd	4th	5th	1st	1st	9th	7th	4th		8th	-				-				-
Sweden	-	-	-	-	-	4th	-	-	-	-	-	-	-	-	-	-	-	-	-	-	-	-			-				-
Belgium	-	-	-	-	-	9th	-		-	-			-				-				-				-				-
Cuba	-	-	-	-	-	-	2nd	9th	5th	1st	3rd	3rd	2nd	-	-	4th	-	5th			-				-				-
Mexico	-	-	-	-	-	-	8th	8th	8th	7th	12th		-				-			14th	-				-				-
Canada	-	-	-	-	-	-	-	11th	9th	9th	6th	9th	10th	11th	11th	16th	-	8th	13th	13th	-				-				-
China	-	-	-	-	-	-	-	-	10th	8th	7th	7th	6th	2nd	6th	12th	-		9th		-				-				-
Greece	-	-	-	-	-	-	-	-	14th	-	-		-		-	14th	-	9th	11th	6th	-				-				-
Guatemala	-	-	-	-	-	-	-	-	15th	-	-	11th	-				-				-				-				-
Spain	-	-	-	-	-	-	-	-	-	11th	-	-	-	-	-	-	5th	1st	5th	7th	-				-				-
Australia	-	-	-	-	-	-	-	-	-	-	11th		9th	4th	5th	3rd	3rd	11th	6th	3rd	-				-				-
South Korea	-	-	-	-	-	-	-	-	-	-	-	10th	11th	-		15th	-		12th	12th	-				-				-
France	-	-	-	-	-	-	-	-	-	-	-	-	13th	12th	10th		12th	10th		11th	-				-				-
Turkey	-	-	-	-	-	-	-	-	-	-	-	-	14th	8th	5th		-				-				-				-
Germany	-	-	-	-	-	-	-	-	-	-	-	-	-	7th			-				-				-				-
Russia	-	-	-	-	-	-	-	-	-	-	-	-	-	-	4th	4th	-	7th	2nd	9th				-				-	
Kazakhstan	-	-	-	-	-	-	-	-	-	-	-	-	-	-	5th	7th	6th	14th		10th	-				-				-
Slovakia	-	-	-	-	-	-	-	-	-	-	-	-	-	-	9th	11th	-				-				-				-
Poland	-	-	-	-	-	-	-	-	-	-	-	-	-	-	-	-	13th				-				-				-
Moldova	-	-	-	-	-	-	-	-	-	-	-	-	-	-	-	-	14th				-				-				-
New Zealand	-	-	-	-	-	-	-	-	-	-	-	-	-	-	-	-	-	12th			-				-				-
Serbia and Montenegro	-	-	-	-	-	-	-	-	-	-	-	-	-	-	-	-	-	-		2nd	-				-				-

== Medal winners ==
Women

Year	Gold	Silver	Bronze
2009	China	Hungary	Russia
2011	China	United States	Russia
2013	Russia	Hungary	Italy
2015	Australia	Canada	Russia
2017	United States	Hungary	Japan
2019	Hungary	Italy	Russia
2021	China	Italy	Australia
2025	Germany	United States	Italy

=== Women's results ===
Last updated after the 2021 Summer World University Games

Team	(Serbia) 2009	(China) 2011	(Russia) 2013	(South Korea) 2015	(Taiwan) 2017	(Italy) 2019	(China) 2021
China	1st	1st	-	9th	-	7th	1st
Hungary	2nd	-	2nd	6th	2nd	1st	-
Russia	3rd	3rd	1st	3rd	4th	3rd	-
Canada	4th	6th	4th	2nd	5th	4th	-
Australia	5th	5th	5th	1st	6th	5th	3rd
Serbia	6th	-	-	10th	-	-	-
Italy	7th	4th	3rd	4th	8th	2nd	2nd
Japan	8th	-	6th	8th	3rd	6th	4th
United States	-	2nd	8th	5th	1st	8th	-
Great Britain	-	7th	-	-	10th	-	-
Mexico	-	8th	-	-	-	-	-
France	-	9th	7th	7th	7th	9th	-
Greece	-	-	-	-	8th	-	-
New Zealand	-	-	-	-	11th	-	-
Argentina	-	-	-	-	12th	-	-
Czech Republic	-	-	-	-	-	10th	-
South Africa	-	-	-	-	-	-	5th
Singapore	-	-	-	-	-	-	6th
Number of teams	8	9	8	10	12	10	6

== Medal table ==
Last updated after the 2025 Summer World University Games

=== Men ===
Rank	Nation	Gold	Silver	Bronze	Total
1	Italy (ITA)	6	4	6	16
2	Hungary (HUN)	5	7	6	18
3	Soviet Union (URS)	4	4	0	8
4	United States (USA)	3	5	2	10
5	Yugoslavia (YUG)	3	1	2	6
6	Serbia (SRB)	2	0	2	4
7	Cuba (CUB)	1	2	2	5
8	Serbia and Montenegro (SCG)	1	1	0	2
9	Australia (AUS)	1	0	3	4
10	Romania (ROU)	1	0	2	3
11	Japan (JPN)	1	0	0	1
11	Montenegro (MNE)	1	0	0	1
11	Spain (ESP)	1	0	0	1
14	Russia (RUS)	0	4	0	4
15	China (CHN)	0	1	0	1
15	Croatia (CRO)	0	1	0	1
17	Brazil (BRA)	0	0	1	1
17	Georgia (GEO)	0	0	1	1
17	Germany (GER)	0	0	1	1
17	North Macedonia (MKD)	0	0	1	1
17	Turkey (TUR)	0	0	1	1
Totals (21 entries)		30	30	30	90

=== Women ===
Rank	Nation	Gold	Silver	Bronze	Total
1	China (CHN)	3	0	0	3
2	Hungary (HUN)	1	3	0	4
3	United States (USA)	1	2	0	3
4	Russia (RUS)	1	0	4	5
5	Australia (AUS)	1	0	1	2
6	Germany (GER)	1	0	0	1
7	Italy (ITA)	0	2	2	4
8	Canada (CAN)	0	1	0	1
9	Japan (JPN)	0	0	1	1
Totals (9 entries)		8	8	8	24

=== Total ===
Rank	Nation	Gold	Silver	Bronze	Total
1	Hungary (HUN)	6	10	6	22
2	Italy (ITA)	6	6	8	20
3	United States (USA)	4	7	2	13
4	Soviet Union (URS)	4	4	0	8
5	Yugoslavia (YUG)	3	1	2	6
6	China (CHN)	3	1	0	4
7	Australia (AUS)	2	0	4	6
8	Serbia (SRB)	2	0	2	4
9	Russia (RUS)	1	4	4	9
10	Cuba (CUB)	1	2	2	5
11	Serbia and Montenegro (SCG)	1	1	0	2
12	Romania (ROU)	1	0	2	3
13	Germany (GER)	1	0	1	2
13	Japan (JPN)	1	0	1	2
15	Montenegro (MNE)	1	0	0	1
15	Spain (ESP)	1	0	0	1
17	Canada (CAN)	0	1	0	1
17	Croatia (CRO)	0	1	0	1
19	Brazil (BRA)	0	0	1	1
19	Georgia (GEO)	0	0	1	1
19	North Macedonia (MKD)	0	0	1	1
19	Turkey (TUR)	0	0	1	1
Totals (22 entries)		38	38	38	114
