= Hungarian Water Polo Federation =

Governing body of water polo in Hungary

- Magyar Vízilabda Szövettség
- Formation: 1989; 37 years ago
- Headquarters: Budapest
- Region served: Hungary
- President: Dénes Kemény
- Website: waterpolo.hu

The Hungarian Water Polo Federation (Hungarian: Magyar Vízilabda Szövetség, pronounced [ˈmɒɟɒr ˈvizilɒbdɒ ˈsøvɛt͡ʃːeːɡ], MVLSZ) is the governing body of water polo in Hungary. It was founded in 1989, previously being part of the Magyar Úszó Szövetség (Hungarian Swimming Association).

The Hungarian Water Polo Federation is a member of the Ligue Européenne de Natation (LEN) and the Fédération Internationale de Natation (FINA). Its headquarters are in Budapest.

== Hosted tournaments ==
World Championships

- 2017 World Aquatics Championships – Budapest, July 14–30
- 2022 World Aquatics Championships – Budapest, June 18 – July 3

European Championships

- 1926 Men's European Water Polo Championship – Budapest, August 18–22
- 1958 Men's European Water Polo Championship – Budapest, August 31 – September 6
- 2001 Men's European Water Polo Championship / 2001 Women's European Water Polo Championship – Budapest, July 15–24
- 2014 Men's European Water Polo Championship / 2014 Women's European Water Polo Championship – Budapest, July 14–27
- 2020 Men's European Water Polo Championship / 2020 Women's European Water Polo Championship – Budapest, January 12–26

== Honours ==
Men's

- Olympic Games: Winner (9 times - 1932, 1936, 1952, 1956, 1964, 1976, 2000, 2004, 2008); Runner-up (3 times - 1928, 1948, 1972); Third place (3 times - 1960, 1968, 1980)
- World Championship: Winner (4 times - 1973, 2003, 2013, 2023); Runner-up (6 times - 1975, 1978, 1982, 1998, 2005, 2007); Third place (1 time - 1991)
- European Championship: Winner (13 times - 1926, 1927, 1931, 1934, 1938, 1954, 1958, 1962, 1974, 1977, 1997, 1999, 2020); Runner-up (6 times - 1970, 1983, 1993, 1995, 2006, 2014); Third place (6 times - 1981, 2001, 2003, 2008, 2012, 2016)
- FINA World League: Gold medal - 2003, 2004; Silver medal - 2005, 2007, 2013, 2014; Bronze medal - 2002
- FINA World Cup: Gold medal - 1979, 1995, 1999; Silver medal - 1993, 1995, 2002, 2006; Bronze medal - 1989, 1997
- Universiade: Gold medal - 1963, 1965, 2003, 2013, 2015; Silver medal - 1959, 1977, 1993, 1995, 1997, 2005; Bronze medal - 1961, 1970, 1999, 2001, 2007

Women's

- World Championship: Winner (2 times - 1994, 2005); Runner-up (1 time - 2001); Third place (1 time - 2013)
- European Championship: Winner (3 times - 1991, 2001, 2016); Runner-up (5 times - 1985, 1987, 1989, 1995, 2003); Third place (6 times - 1993, 2006, 2008, 2012, 2014, 2020)
- FINA World League: Silver medal - 2004
- FINA World Cup: Gold medal - 2002; Silver medal - 1988; Bronze medal - 1989, 1993, 1995
- Universiade: Silver medal - 2009, 2013

== Divisions ==
Men's

- Hungary men's national water polo team
- Hungary men's national junior water polo team
- Hungary men's national youth water polo team

Women's

- Hungary women's national water polo team
- Hungary women's junior national water polo team
- Hungary women's youth national water polo team

=== Current head coaches ===
As of 21 July 2016

Men's Team	Name
National team	(Hungary) Tibor Benedek
Junior team	(Hungary) István Kis, Kálmán Tóth
Youth team	(Hungary) György Horkai

Women's Team	Name
National team	(Hungary) Attila Bíró
Junior team	(Hungary) Tamás Faragó, Gábor Godova
Youth team	(Hungary) Tamás Faragó, Gábor Godova

== Competitions ==
Magyar Vízilabda Szövetség is responsible for organising the following competitions:

=== Men's water polo ===
- Országos Bajnokság I (Tier 1)
- Országos Bajnokság I/B (Tier 2) – two sections
- Országos Bajnokság II (Tier 3) – four sections (South-East, North-East, Central, West)

=== Women's water polo ===
- Országos Bajnokság I (women) (Tier 1)
- Országos Bajnokság I/B (women) (Tier 2)

=== Cups ===
- Magyar Kupa – Men
- Magyar Kupa (women) – Women

== Presidents ==
- András Bodnár (1989–1992)
- Gábor Princz (1992–1998)
- György Martin (1998–2012)
- Dénes Kemény (2012–2018)
- Attila Vári (2018–2022)
- Norbert Madaras (2022– )

== Current sponsorships ==
- e·on - Official main sponsor
- Volvo - Official sponsor
- Vodafone - Official sponsor
- Huawei - Official sponsor
- Soproni - Official sponsor
- Univer - Official sponsor
- Unicum - Official sponsor
- Diapolo - Official sponsor
- M4 Sport - Official sponsor
- Volánbusz - Official sponsor
- BENU - Official sponsor
- OMV - Official sponsor
- Marriott Budapest - Official sponsor

== See also ==
- Hungarian water polo league system
