= Zsolt Varga (water polo, born 1972) =

Hungarian water polo player

Personal information
- Nationality: Hungarian; Italian
- Born: 9 March 1972 (age 54) Budapest, Hungary
- Height: 1.86 m (6 ft 1 in)

Sport
- Sport: Water polo
- Position: Centre forward
- Current club: Hungary (head coach)

Youth career
- Years: Team
- –: KSI

Senior clubs
- Years: Team
- –1989: KSI
- 1989–1990: Újpest
- 1990–1997: BVSC
- 1997–2001: HAVK Mladost
- 2001–2004: Savona
- 2004–2008: Bissolati Cremona
- 2007: → Sirens (Summer League)
- 2008–2010: Posillipo
- 2010–2012: Ferencváros
National team
Years	Team	Apps
–2002	Hungary	295

Teams coached
- –2014: Hungary U20 (assistant)
- 2012–: Ferencváros (youth)
- 2013–2023: Ferencváros
- 2022–present: Hungary
Medal record
Men's water polo
Representing Hungary
Olympic Games
Gold medal – first place	2000 Sydney	Team
World Championships
Silver medal – second place	1998 Perth
FINA World Cup
Gold medal – first place	1995 Atlanta
Gold medal – first place	1999 Sydney
Silver medal – second place	1993 Athens
Bronze medal – third place	1997 Athens
European Championships
Gold medal – first place	1997 Seville
Gold medal – first place	1999 Florence
Silver medal – second place	1993 Sheffield
Silver medal – second place	1995 Vienna
Bronze medal – third place	2001 Budapest
- Updated on 2 August 2023

Zsolt Varga (born March 9, 1972, in Budapest) is a Hungarian water polo player, who played on the golden medals squad at the 2000. He also participated in the 1996 Summer Olympics, where the Hungarian team placed 4th. He made his debut for the national side in 1990, at the European Nations Cup in Rome, Italy.

== Honours ==
=== National ===
- Olympic Games: Gold medal - 2000
- World Championships: Silver medal - 1998
- European Championship: Gold medal - 1997, 1999; Silver medal - 1993, 1995; Bronze medal - 2001
- Junior European Championship: (Bronze medal - 1988, 1990)

=== Club ===
European competitions:

- Cup Winners' Cup Winners (1): (1999 - with Mladost)

Domestic competitions:

- Hungarian Championship (OB I): 2x (1996, 1997 - with BVSC)
- Hungarian Cup (Magyar Kupa): 1x (1995 - with BVSC)
- Croatian Championship (Prva HVL): 1x (1999 - with Mladost)
- Croatian Cup (Kup Hrvatske): 2x (1998, 1999 - with Mladost)

== Awards ==
- Youth water polo player of the year: 1989
- Member of the Hungarian team of year: 1993, 1997, 1999, 2000
- Hungarian Water Polo Player of the Year: 1996

Orders

- Officer's Cross of the Order of Merit of the Republic of Hungary (2000)

== See also ==
- Hungary men's Olympic water polo team records and statistics
- List of Olympic champions in men's water polo
- List of Olympic medalists in water polo (men)
- List of world champions in men's water polo
- List of World Aquatics Championships medalists in water polo
