= Rod Owen-Jones =

Australian water polo player

Personal information
- Born: 6 January 1970 (age 56) Sydney, Australia
- Height: 197 cm (6 ft 6 in)
- Weight: 101 kg (223 lb)

Sport
- Sport: Water polo
Medal record
Representing Australia
FINA Water Polo World Cup
Bronze medal – third place	1993 Athens	Team competition
Summer Universiade
Bronze medal – third place	1995 Fukuoka	Team competition
Bronze medal – third place	1997 Sicily	Team competition

Rod Owen-Jones (born 6 January 1970) is an Australian water polo player who competed in the 2000 Summer Olympics.

Rod began his career playing in South Australia as a center-forward but switched to a utility player during his national team duties.

Rod played with the Australia men's national water polo team from 1991 to 2000. Rod represented the national team in the 1993 FINA Water Polo World Cup winning a bronze medal, Australia's best men's result at a major championship. He represented Australia at 3 Universiades, 2 World Championships, 2 World Cups and an Olympic Games.

Rod was the highest goal scorer at the 1993 and 1994 National Championships and voted as the Best and Fairest men's player in 1994.
