= Greg Boyer (water polo) =

American water polo player (born 1958)

Personal information
- Full name: Gregory Vaitl Boyer
- Born: February 5, 1958 (age 68) New York City, New York, U.S.
- Education: UC Santa Barbara
- Height: 6 ft 2.5 in (189 cm)
- Weight: 209 lb (95 kg)
- Spouse: Reenie Boyer (1985–present)
- Website: looplifewithgregandreeniee.blogspot.com

Sport
- Country: United States
- Sport: Men's water polo
- Position: Field
- University team: UC Santa Barbara men's water polo
- Club: Industry Hills; Santa Barbara Water Polo Club; Sunset Water Polo Club; Santa Barbara Masters
- Turned pro: 1981
Medal record
Men's water polo
Representing the United States
Olympic Games
Silver medal – second place	1988 Seoul	Men's water polo
- Updated on 23:29, September 17, 2014 (UTC)

Gregory Vaitl Boyer (born February 5, 1958) is a former American water polo player who was a member of the United States men's national water polo team and won a silver medal at the 1988 Summer Olympics in Seoul, South Korea.

== Early life and education ==
Boyer grew up in New York City and played water polo at Aviation High School.

He attended the University of California, Santa Barbara where he played on the Gauchos men's water polo team from 1976–1979. He was a three-time All-American, being named to the first team in 1979. The Gauchos won the 1979 NCAA Division I Men's Water Polo Championship with Boyer named the Most Outstanding Player of the tournament.

== Career ==
Boyer started his club career with now-defunct Industry Hills in 1981 with former Gaucho teammate Craig Wilson. With Boyer leading the team, Industry Hills was named the USWP National Outdoor Champions in 1981, 1982, and 1984. He left the club in 1985 to return to his collegiate stomping grounds, joining the Santa Barbara Water Polo Club in 1986 and 1987. In addition to playing for Santa Barbara, Boyer was a member of Sunset Water Polo Club from 1987 to 1988 and was a member of Sunset's 1988 USWP National Indoor Championship team.

In 1989, Boyer joined Santa Barbara Masters, a squad partially composed of the 1979 UC Santa Barbara Gauchos national championship team.

=== International ===
Boyer's first accomplishments with the United States men's national water polo team came at the Universiade, otherwise known as the World University Games. In the 1979 Summer Universiade, he won a gold medal in Water polo at the 1979 Summer Universiade. He followed that up in the 1981 Summer Universiade with a silver medal in Water polo at the 1981 Summer Universiade.

He was a mainstay on the United States team for the FINA Water Polo World Cup and was named to the 1981, 1983, 1985, and 1987 teams. He won a silver medal in 1985. Boyer also competed in the FINA World Aquatics Championships for the United States, appearing in the 1982 and 1986 editions.

Boyer missed out on participating in the 1986 Goodwill Games due to a broken hand suffered on July 5, 1986 despite being already named to the roster.

After missing out on being named to the national team for the 1984 Summer Olympics, Boyer was named to the team for the 1988 Summer Olympics as he neared the end of his international career. The United States lost to Yugoslavia in the finals of the Water polo at the 1988 Summer Olympics, but Boyer returned with an Olympic silver medal for his efforts.

== Post-playing career ==
Boyer attended law school at Western State University College of Law and was admitted to the State Bar of California on June 28, 1993.

Before the 1996 Summer Olympics, Boyer was selected to carry the Olympic Torch in Orange County on April 28, 1996. He stayed close to the Olympic and water polo community, serving as a referee in the 2000 Summer Olympics and coached children at his local water polo club.

== Legacy ==
Boyer is a member of the Class of 1998 USA Water Polo Hall of Fame and was inducted July 17, 1999.

He's also in the UCSB Gaucho Athletic Hall of Fame twice, being named once individually and once as a member of the 1979 NCAA Championship men's water polo team.

=== Boyer shot ===
Among his lasting records and achievements, Greg Boyer is credited with creating the "Boyer shot". This water polo move incorporates a quick, lateral movement coupled with a shot to get around opposing defenders' arms and catch goalkeepers off guard.

== See also ==
- List of Olympic medalists in water polo (men)
