= Nathan Thomas (water polo) =

Australian water polo player

Personal information
- Born: 28 August 1972 (age 54) Tamworth, New South Wales, Australia

Sport
- Sport: Water polo
Medal record
Representing Australia
Summer Universiade
Bronze medal – third place	1995 Fukuoka	Team competition
Bronze medal – third place	1997 Sicily	Team competition

Nathan Thomas (born 28 August 1972) is an Australian water polo player who competed in the 2000 Summer Olympics and in the 2004 Summer Olympics. Thomas was the captain of the Australia men's national water polo team in 2004.

== Personal life ==
Thomas was raised in Tamworth, Australia, where he attended West Tamworth High School. He has since retired from water polo and has focused on other aspects of his life, such as his daughters Nioka and Zoe. His daughter Nioka has since joined UC Irvine Women's Water Polo team in hopes of one day to continue his legacy and represent Australia in the Olympics.

== See also ==
- Australia men's Olympic water polo team records and statistics
