= Hungary at the 2019 Summer Universiade =

- Flag of Hungary
- IOC code: HUN

in Naples, Italy 3 July 2019 – 14 July 2019
- Medals Ranked 34th: Gold 1 Silver 0 Bronze 2 Total 3

Summer Universiade appearances
- 1959; 1961; 1963; 1965; 1967; 1970; 1973; 1975; 1977; 1979; 1981; 1983; 1985; 1987; 1989; 1991; 1993; 1995; 1997; 1999; 2001; 2003; 2005; 2007; 2009; 2011; 2013; 2015; 2017; 2019; 2021; 2025; 2027

Hungary competed at the 2019 Summer Universiade in Naples, Italy held from 3 to 14 July 2019. The country won one gold medal and two bronze medals.

== Medal summary ==
=== Medal by sports ===
Medals by sport
Judo	0	0	1	1
Water polo	1	0	1	2
Total	1	0	2	3

=== Medalists ===
Medal	Name	Sport	Event	Date
Gold	Women's team	Water polo	Women's tournament	July 13
Bronze	Men's team	Water polo	Men's tournament	July 14
Bronze	Krisztián Tóth	Judo	Men's middleweight –90 kg	July 4
