= Water polo at the 2015 Summer Universiade =

Water polo at the XXVIII Summer Universiade
- Venue: various
- Dates: July 2, 2015 – July 14, 2015
- Teams: 13 (men); 10 (women)

Water polo was contested at the 2015 Summer Universiade from July 2 to 14 in Gwangju, South Korea. The top players qualified for the 2016 Summer Olympics in Rio de Janeiro.

== Medal summary ==
=== Medal table ===
Rank	Nation	Gold	Silver	Bronze	Total
1	Australia (AUS)	1	0	0	1
1	Hungary (HUN)	1	0	0	1
3	Canada (CAN)	0	1	0	1
3	Italy (ITA)	0	1	0	1
5	Russia (RUS)	0	0	1	1
5	United States (USA)	0	0	1	1
Totals (6 entries)		2	2	2	6

=== Medal events ===
Event	Gold	Silver	Bronze
Men	Hungary	Italy	United States
Women	Australia	Canada	Russia

== Men ==
13 teams participated in the men's tournament. All of the members of the US team were Bruins.

=== Teams ===
Pool A

- Hungary
- Australia
- Italy
- Brazil
- South Korea
- France
- Netherlands

Pool B

- Russia
- Japan
- Serbia
- United States
- Turkey
- China

== Women ==
10 teams participated in the women's tournament.

=== Teams ===
Pool A

- Canada
- Japan
- Russia
- China
- Serbia

Pool B

- Italy
- United States
- Australia
- France
- Hungary
