= 2017 FINA Men's Water Polo World League =

- League: FINA Water Polo World League
- Sport: Water Polo
- Duration: 15 November 2016 to 25 June 2017

Super Final
- Finals champions: Serbia (11th title)
- Runners-up: Italy

FINA Men's Water Polo World League seasons
- ← 2016 2018 →

The 2017 FINA Men's Water Polo World League is the 16th edition of the annual men's international water polo tournament. It was played between November 2016 and June 2017 and opened to all men's water polo national teams. After participating in a preliminary round, eight teams qualify to play in a final tournament, called the Super Final from 20–25 June 2017.

In the world league, there are specific rules that do not allow matches to end in a draw. If teams are level at the end of the 4th quarter of any world league match, the match will be decided by a penalty shootout. Teams earn points in the standings in group matches as follows:

- Match won in normal time - 3 points
- Match won in shootout - 2 points
- Match lost in shootout - 1 point
- Match lost in normal time - 0 points

== Europe ==
=== Preliminary round ===
The European preliminary round consisted of two groups of four teams and a third group of three teams. The winner of each group after the home and away series of games qualified for the Super Final.

==== Group A ====
Pos	Team	Pld	W	OTW	OTL	L	GF	GA	GD	Pts	Qualification	Serbia	Slovakia	Romania	Germany
1	Serbia	6	5	1	0	0	85	37	+48	17	Super Final	—	11–2	19–8	20–3
2	Slovakia	6	2	0	2	2	44	51	−7	8		11–11^{(6–7 PSO)}	—	6–5	10–7
3	Romania	6	2	0	1	3	48	61	−13	7		4–9	12–10	—	9–7
4	Germany	6	0	2	0	4	41	69	−28	4		9–15	5–5^{(4–3 PSO)}	10–10^{(4–3 PSO)}	—

Source: FINA

==== Group B ====
Pos	Team	Pld	W	OTW	OTL	L	GF	GA	GD	Pts	Qualification	Croatia	Greece	Netherlands	France
1	Croatia	6	5	0	0	1	84	45	+39	15	Super Final	—	11–6	17–7	16–6
2	Greece	6	5	0	0	1	61	42	+19	15		10–8	—	9–8	16–7
3	Netherlands	6	2	0	0	4	44	70	−26	6		7–18	4–10	—	11–10
4	France	6	0	0	0	6	42	74	−32	0		9–14	4–10	6–7	—

Source: FINA

==== Group C ====
Pos	Team	Pld	W	OTW	OTL	L	GF	GA	GD	Pts	Qualification	Italy	Russia	Georgia
1	Italy	4	4	0	0	0	49	33	+16	12	Super Final	—	12–9	14–5
2	Russia	4	2	0	0	2	49	43	+6	6	Host Super Final	7–10	—	19–8
3	Georgia	4	0	0	0	4	38	60	−22	0		12–13	13–14	—

Source: FINA

== Intercontinental Water Polo Tournament ==
April 25–30, 2017 Gold Coast Aquatic Centre, Gold Coast, Queensland, Australia

=== Group stage ===
Pos	Team	Pld	W	OTW	OTL	L	GF	GA	GD	Pts	Qualification	Australia	United States	Japan	Kazakhstan	People's Republic of China	New Zealand
1	Australia (H)	5	4	1	0	0	62	26	+36	14	Super Final	—	12–8	9–9^{(4–2 PSO)}	10–3	13–3	18–3
2	United States	5	4	0	0	1	71	42	+29	12	Super Final	—	—	—	15–10	18–6	—
3	Japan	5	3	0	1	1	69	37	+32	10	Super Final	—	8–10	—	—	20–6	—
4	Kazakhstan	5	2	0	0	3	41	53	−12	6	Super Final	—	—	6–14	—	—	15–8
5	China	5	1	0	0	4	30	65	−35	3		—	—	—	6–7	—	9–7
6	New Zealand	5	0	0	0	5	30	80	−50	0		—	6–20	6–18	—	—	—

Source: FINA
(H) Host

=== Final stage ===
==== 5th Place ====
30 April 2017; 9:20	China	4–5	New Zealand	Gold Coast Aquatic Centre, Gold Coast, Queensland, Australia; Referees: Daniel Flahive (AUS), Yusuke Kajiwara (JPN)
30 April 2017; 9:20	Score by quarters: 0–1, 1–1, 2–1, 1–2			Gold Coast Aquatic Centre, Gold Coast, Queensland, Australia; Referees: Daniel Flahive (AUS), Yusuke Kajiwara (JPN)
30 April 2017; 9:20	four players 1	Goals	five players 1	Gold Coast Aquatic Centre, Gold Coast, Queensland, Australia; Referees: Daniel Flahive (AUS), Yusuke Kajiwara (JPN)

==== 3rd Place ====
30 April 2017; 10:40	Japan	12–7	Kazakhstan	Gold Coast Aquatic Centre, Gold Coast, Queensland, Australia; Referees: Michael Brook (NZL), Haziel Ortega (USA)
30 April 2017; 10:40	Score by quarters: 0–2, 1–0, 4–2, 7–3			Gold Coast Aquatic Centre, Gold Coast, Queensland, Australia; Referees: Michael Brook (NZL), Haziel Ortega (USA)
30 April 2017; 10:40	five players 2	Goals	Medvedev, Pilipenko 2	Gold Coast Aquatic Centre, Gold Coast, Queensland, Australia; Referees: Michael Brook (NZL), Haziel Ortega (USA)

==== Final ====
30 April 2017; 12:10	Australia	8–6	United States	Gold Coast Aquatic Centre, Gold Coast, Queensland, Australia; Referees: Dragan Stampalija (CRO), Vojin Putnikovic (SRB)
30 April 2017; 12:10	Score by quarters: 3–2, 2–2, 1–1, 2–1			Gold Coast Aquatic Centre, Gold Coast, Queensland, Australia; Referees: Dragan Stampalija (CRO), Vojin Putnikovic (SRB)
30 April 2017; 12:10	three players 2	Goals	Hooper 2	Gold Coast Aquatic Centre, Gold Coast, Queensland, Australia; Referees: Dragan Stampalija (CRO), Vojin Putnikovic (SRB)

== Super Final ==
June 20–25, 2017 Ruza, Ruzsky District, Moscow Oblast, Russia
In the Super Final the eight qualifying teams are split into two groups of four teams with all teams progressing to the knock-out stage.

=== Qualified teams ===
Africa	Americas	Asia	Europe	Oceania
—	United States	Japan; Kazakhstan	Croatia; Italy; Russia (Host); Serbia	Australia

=== Group A ===
Pos	Team	Pld	W	OTW	OTL	L	GF	GA	GD	Pts	Qualification
1	Serbia	3	3	0	0	0	43	22	+21	9	Quarterfinals
2	Italy	3	1	1	0	1	30	26	+4	5	Quarterfinals
3	United States	3	1	0	1	1	29	34	−5	4	Quarterfinals
4	Kazakhstan	3	0	0	0	3	23	43	−20	0	Quarterfinals

Source: FINA

20 June 2017; 16:40	Serbia	15–7	Kazakhstan	Ruza, Russia; Referees: Benjamin Mercier (FRA), Yosuke Kajiwara (JPN)
20 June 2017; 16:40	Score by quarters: 3–0, 6–4, 3–2, 3–1			Ruza, Russia; Referees: Benjamin Mercier (FRA), Yosuke Kajiwara (JPN)
20 June 2017; 16:40	D. Pijetlović 3	Goals	Shakenov 3	Ruza, Russia; Referees: Benjamin Mercier (FRA), Yosuke Kajiwara (JPN)

20 June 2017; 18:00	United States	5–5 ^{(2–4 PSO)} (PSO)	Italy	Ruza, Russia; Referees: Adrian Alexandrescu (ROU), Sergey Krizhanovskiy (RUS)
20 June 2017; 18:00	Score by quarters: 1–0, 2–0, 2–3, 0–2 PSO: 2–4			Ruza, Russia; Referees: Adrian Alexandrescu (ROU), Sergey Krizhanovskiy (RUS)
20 June 2017; 18:00	Bowen 3	Goals	Iodice 3	Ruza, Russia; Referees: Adrian Alexandrescu (ROU), Sergey Krizhanovskiy (RUS)

21 June 2017; 16:00	United States	14–10	Kazakhstan	Ruza, Russia; Referees: Nikolaos Boudramis (GRE), Miroslav Vlasic (CRO)
21 June 2017; 16:00	Score by quarters: 3–0, 4–3, 4–2, 3–5			Ruza, Russia; Referees: Nikolaos Boudramis (GRE), Miroslav Vlasic (CRO)
21 June 2017; 16:00	DeTrane 3	Goals	Ukumanov 3	Ruza, Russia; Referees: Nikolaos Boudramis (GRE), Miroslav Vlasic (CRO)

21 June 2017; 17:20	Serbia	13–7	Italy	Ruza, Russia; Referees: Francesc Buch (ESP), Nicholas Hodgers (AUS)
21 June 2017; 17:20	Score by quarters: 2–1, 3–2, 4–3, 4–1			Ruza, Russia; Referees: Francesc Buch (ESP), Nicholas Hodgers (AUS)
21 June 2017; 17:20	D. Pijetlović, Filipović 3	Goals	Aicardi 4	Ruza, Russia; Referees: Francesc Buch (ESP), Nicholas Hodgers (AUS)

22 June 2017; 17:20	Serbia	15–8	United States	Ruza, Russia; Referees: Adrian Alexandrescu (ROU), Sergey Krizhanovskiy (RUS)
22 June 2017; 17:20	Score by quarters: 4–3, 6–1, 2–1, 3–3			Ruza, Russia; Referees: Adrian Alexandrescu (ROU), Sergey Krizhanovskiy (RUS)
22 June 2017; 17:20	S. Mitrović 4	Goals	Hallock 3	Ruza, Russia; Referees: Adrian Alexandrescu (ROU), Sergey Krizhanovskiy (RUS)

22 June 2017; 18:40	Kazakhstan	6–14	Italy	Ruza, Russia; Referees: Miroslav Vlasic (CRO), Benjamin Mercier (FRA)
22 June 2017; 18:40	Score by quarters: 0–3, 1–3, 2–5, 3–3			Ruza, Russia; Referees: Miroslav Vlasic (CRO), Benjamin Mercier (FRA)
22 June 2017; 18:40	Medvedev, Pilipenko 2	Goals	Iodice 4	Ruza, Russia; Referees: Miroslav Vlasic (CRO), Benjamin Mercier (FRA)

=== Group B ===
Pos	Team	Pld	W	OTW	OTL	L	GF	GA	GD	Pts	Qualification
1	Croatia	3	3	0	0	0	33	15	+18	9	Quarterfinals
2	Russia (H)	3	2	0	0	1	30	22	+8	6	Quarterfinals
3	Australia	3	1	0	0	2	17	27	−10	3	Quarterfinals
4	Japan	3	0	0	0	3	18	34	−16	0	Quarterfinals

Source: FINA
(H) Host

20 June 2017; 15:20	Croatia	13–5	Japan	Ruza, Russia; Referees: Nikolaos Boudramis (GRE), Haz Ortega (USA)
20 June 2017; 15:20	Score by quarters: 4–2, 3–0, 1–2, 5–1			Ruza, Russia; Referees: Nikolaos Boudramis (GRE), Haz Ortega (USA)
20 June 2017; 15:20	Petković, Šetka 3	Goals	five players 1	Ruza, Russia; Referees: Nikolaos Boudramis (GRE), Haz Ortega (USA)

20 June 2017; 20:15	Australia	5–11	Russia	Ruza, Russia; Referees: Francesc Buch (ESP), Andreja Stanojevic (SRB)
20 June 2017; 20:15	Score by quarters: 2–2, 1–2, 1–4, 1–3			Ruza, Russia; Referees: Francesc Buch (ESP), Andreja Stanojevic (SRB)
20 June 2017; 20:15	Younger 4	Goals	four players 2	Ruza, Russia; Referees: Francesc Buch (ESP), Andreja Stanojevic (SRB)

21 June 2017; 18:40	Australia	9–8	Japan	Ruza, Russia; Referees: Adrian Alexandrescu (ROU), Damir Temyrkhanov (KAZ)
21 June 2017; 18:40	Score by quarters: 2–3, 2–0, 2–3, 3–2			Ruza, Russia; Referees: Adrian Alexandrescu (ROU), Damir Temyrkhanov (KAZ)
21 June 2017; 18:40	Kayes 4	Goals	Arai 3	Ruza, Russia; Referees: Adrian Alexandrescu (ROU), Damir Temyrkhanov (KAZ)

21 June 2017; 20:00	Croatia	12–7	Russia	Ruza, Russia; Referees: Benjamin Mercier (FRA), Rafaele Colombo (ITA)
21 June 2017; 20:00	Score by quarters: 3–1, 2–2, 5–1, 2–3			Ruza, Russia; Referees: Benjamin Mercier (FRA), Rafaele Colombo (ITA)
21 June 2017; 20:00	Petković 4	Goals	Lazarev 2	Ruza, Russia; Referees: Benjamin Mercier (FRA), Rafaele Colombo (ITA)

22 June 2017; 16:00	Croatia	8–3	Australia	Ruza, Russia; Referees: Nikolaos Boudramis (GRE), Haz Ortega (USA)
22 June 2017; 16:00	Score by quarters: 3–0, 0–1, 3–0, 2–2			Ruza, Russia; Referees: Nikolaos Boudramis (GRE), Haz Ortega (USA)
22 June 2017; 16:00	Šetka 3	Goals	three players 1	Ruza, Russia; Referees: Nikolaos Boudramis (GRE), Haz Ortega (USA)

22 June 2017; 20:00	Japan	5–12	Russia	Ruza, Russia; Referees: Francesc Buch (ESP), Rafaele Colombo (ITA)
22 June 2017; 20:00	Score by quarters: 2–3, 2–3, 0–2, 1–4			Ruza, Russia; Referees: Francesc Buch (ESP), Rafaele Colombo (ITA)
22 June 2017; 20:00	Adachi 2	Goals	Merkulov, Lisunov 3	Ruza, Russia; Referees: Francesc Buch (ESP), Rafaele Colombo (ITA)

=== Knockout stage ===
Quarterfinals
Italy	13
Australia	5
Kazakhstan	3
Croatia	19
United States	8
Russia	6
Serbia	19
Japan	10

Semifinals
Italy (pen.)	6 (3)
Croatia	6 (1)
United States	8 (3)
Serbia (pen.)	8 (5)

Final
Italy	9
Serbia	10
Third place
Croatia	10
United States	4

5th–8th Places

Semifinals
Australia	8 (3)
Kazakhstan (pen.)	8 (4)
Russia (pen.)	12 (6)
Japan	12 (5)

Fifth place
Kazakhstan	4
Russia	11
Seventh place
Australia	11
Japan	4

==== Quarterfinals ====
23 June 2017; 16:00	Italy	13–5	Australia	Ruza, Russia; Referees: Nikolaos Boudramis (GRE), Andreja Stanojevic (SRB)
23 June 2017; 16:00	Score by quarters: 3–1, 4–2, 4–1, 2–1			Ruza, Russia; Referees: Nikolaos Boudramis (GRE), Andreja Stanojevic (SRB)
23 June 2017; 16:00	Figlioli 5	Goals	Younger 2	Ruza, Russia; Referees: Nikolaos Boudramis (GRE), Andreja Stanojevic (SRB)

23 June 2017; 17:20	Serbia	19–10	Japan	Ruza, Russia; Referees: Haz Ortega (USA), Damir Temyrkhanov (KAZ)
23 June 2017; 17:20	Score by quarters: 4–1, 6–0, 4–3, 5–6			Ruza, Russia; Referees: Haz Ortega (USA), Damir Temyrkhanov (KAZ)
23 June 2017; 17:20	Ubović 4	Goals	Arai, Okawa 3	Ruza, Russia; Referees: Haz Ortega (USA), Damir Temyrkhanov (KAZ)

23 June 2017; 18:40	Kazakhstan	3–19	Croatia	Ruza, Russia; Referees: Nicholas Hodgers (AUS), Yosuke Kajiwara (JPN)
23 June 2017; 18:40	Score by quarters: 0–6, 2–3, 0–6, 1–4			Ruza, Russia; Referees: Nicholas Hodgers (AUS), Yosuke Kajiwara (JPN)
23 June 2017; 18:40	Shakenov 2	Goals	Šetka 5	Ruza, Russia; Referees: Nicholas Hodgers (AUS), Yosuke Kajiwara (JPN)

23 June 2017; 20:00	United States	8–6	Russia	Ruza, Russia; Referees: Benjamin Mercier (FRA), Miroslav Vlasic (CRO)
23 June 2017; 20:00	Score by quarters: 2–1, 4–2, 2–1, 0–2			Ruza, Russia; Referees: Benjamin Mercier (FRA), Miroslav Vlasic (CRO)
23 June 2017; 20:00	three players 2	Goals	Merkulov, Nagaev 2	Ruza, Russia; Referees: Benjamin Mercier (FRA), Miroslav Vlasic (CRO)

==== 5th–8th Places Semifinals ====
24 June 2017; 16:00	Australia	8–8 ^{(3–4 PSO)} (PSO)	Kazakhstan	Ruza, Russia; Referees: Rafaele Colombo (ITA), Yosuke Kajiwara (JPN)
24 June 2017; 16:00	Score by quarters: 0–4, 3–1, 1–2, 4–1 PSO: 3–4			Ruza, Russia; Referees: Rafaele Colombo (ITA), Yosuke Kajiwara (JPN)
24 June 2017; 16:00	Younger 4	Goals	Ukumanov 4	Ruza, Russia; Referees: Rafaele Colombo (ITA), Yosuke Kajiwara (JPN)

24 June 2017; 17:20	Russia	12–12 ^{(6–5 PSO)} (PSO)	Japan	Ruza, Russia; Referees: Miroslav Vlasic (CRO), Andreja Stanojevic (SRB)
24 June 2017; 17:20	Score by quarters: 3–4, 5–2, 4–4, 0–2 PSO: 6–5			Ruza, Russia; Referees: Miroslav Vlasic (CRO), Andreja Stanojevic (SRB)
24 June 2017; 17:20	Ashaev, Merkulov 5	Goals	Adachi, Arai 4	Ruza, Russia; Referees: Miroslav Vlasic (CRO), Andreja Stanojevic (SRB)

==== Semifinals ====
24 June 2017; 18:40	Italy	6–6 ^{(3–1 PSO)} (PSO)	Croatia	Ruza, Russia; Referees: Francesc Buch (ESP), Sergey Krizhanovskiy (RUS)
24 June 2017; 18:40	Score by quarters: 1–1, 3–2, 1–2, 1–1 PSO: 3–1			Ruza, Russia; Referees: Francesc Buch (ESP), Sergey Krizhanovskiy (RUS)
24 June 2017; 18:40	Figlioli, Gallo 3	Goals	Šetka 3	Ruza, Russia; Referees: Francesc Buch (ESP), Sergey Krizhanovskiy (RUS)

24 June 2017; 20:00	United States	8–8 ^{(3–5 PSO)} (PSO)	Serbia	Ruza, Russia; Referees: Nikolaos Boudramis (GRE), Benjamin Mercier (FRA)
24 June 2017; 20:00	Score by quarters: 0–0, 4–3, 2–2, 2–3 PSO: 3–5			Ruza, Russia; Referees: Nikolaos Boudramis (GRE), Benjamin Mercier (FRA)
24 June 2017; 20:00	Bowen, Roelse 3	Goals	Aleksić, Prlainović 3	Ruza, Russia; Referees: Nikolaos Boudramis (GRE), Benjamin Mercier (FRA)

==== 7th Place ====
25 June 2017; 12:00	Australia	11–4	Japan	Ruza, Russia; Referees: Andreja Stanojevic (SRB), Damir Temyrkhanov (KAZ)
25 June 2017; 12:00	Score by quarters: 2–0, 3–2, 4–1, 2–1			Ruza, Russia; Referees: Andreja Stanojevic (SRB), Damir Temyrkhanov (KAZ)
25 June 2017; 12:00	Kayes 3	Goals	four players 1	Ruza, Russia; Referees: Andreja Stanojevic (SRB), Damir Temyrkhanov (KAZ)

==== 5th Place ====
25 June 2017; 13:20	Kazakhstan	4–11	Russia	Ruza, Russia; Referees: Nicholas Hodgers (AUS), Rafaele Colombo (ITA)
25 June 2017; 13:20	Score by quarters: 1–2, 1–3, 1–1, 1–5			Ruza, Russia; Referees: Nicholas Hodgers (AUS), Rafaele Colombo (ITA)
25 June 2017; 13:20	Medvedev 2	Goals	three players 2	Ruza, Russia; Referees: Nicholas Hodgers (AUS), Rafaele Colombo (ITA)

==== 3rd Place ====
25 June 2017; 14:40	(bronze) Croatia	10–4	United States	Ruza, Russia; Referees: Rafaele Colombo (ITA), Benjamin Mercier (FRA)
25 June 2017; 14:40	Score by quarters: 5–1, 3–1, 1–1, 1–1			Ruza, Russia; Referees: Rafaele Colombo (ITA), Benjamin Mercier (FRA)
25 June 2017; 14:40	Šetka 3	Goals	Carniglia 2	Ruza, Russia; Referees: Rafaele Colombo (ITA), Benjamin Mercier (FRA)

==== Final ====
25 June 2017; 16:00	(silver) Italy	9–10	Serbia (gold)	Ruza, Russia; Referees: Francesc Buch (ESP), Adrian Alexandrescu (ROU)
25 June 2017; 16:00	Score by quarters: 4–1, 0–2, 2–5, 3–2			Ruza, Russia; Referees: Francesc Buch (ESP), Adrian Alexandrescu (ROU)
25 June 2017; 16:00	Di Fulvio, Figlioli 3	Goals	D. Pijetlović, S. Mitrović 3	Ruza, Russia; Referees: Francesc Buch (ESP), Adrian Alexandrescu (ROU)

== Final ranking ==
Rank	Team
Gold medal	Serbia
Silver medal	Italy
Bronze medal	Croatia
4	United States
5	Russia
6	Kazakhstan
7	Australia
8	Japan

2017 FINA Men's Water Polo World League

Serbia
Eleventh title

Team roster

Gojko Pijetlović, Gavril Subotić, Viktor Rašović, Sava Ranđelović, Miloš Ćuk, Duško Pijetlović, Nemanja Ubović, Milan Aleksić, Radomir Drašović, Filip Filipović, Andrija Prlainović, Stefan Mitrović, and Branislav Mitrović. Head coach: Dejan Savić.

== Awards ==
Best scorer
(Croatia) Anđelo Šetka 19 goals
