= Filip Klikovac =

Montenegrin water polo player

Personal information
- Born: 7 February 1989 (age 37)
- Height: 190 cm (6 ft 3 in)
- Weight: 118 kg (260 lb)

Sport
- Sport: Water polo
- Club: CN Posillipo
Medal record
Representing Montenegro
World Championships
Silver medal – second place	2013 Barcelona	team
European Championship
Silver medal – second place	2012 Eindhoven	team
Mediterranean Games
Bronze medal – third place	2018 Tarragona	Team
Universiade
Gold medal – first place	2007 Bangkok	Team

Filip Klikovac (Serbian Cyrillic: Филип Кликовац; born 7 February 1989) is a water polo player from Montenegro. He was part of the Montenegrin team at the 2016 Summer Olympics, where the team finished in fourth place.

== See also ==
- List of World Aquatics Championships medalists in water polo
