= Water polo at the 2013 Summer Universiade =

Water polo at the XXVII Summer Universiade
- Venue: various
- Dates: July 5, 2013 – July 17, 2013
- Teams: 12 (men); 8 (women)

Water polo was contested at the 2013 Summer Universiade from July 5 to 17 in Kazan, Russia.

== Medal summary ==
=== Medal table ===
| Rank | Nation | Gold | Silver | Bronze | Total |
|---|---|---|---|---|---|
| 1 | Hungary (HUN) | 1 | 1 | 0 | 2 |
| 1 | Russia (RUS)* | 1 | 1 | 0 | 2 |
| 3 | Italy (ITA) | 0 | 0 | 1 | 1 |
| 3 | Serbia (SRB) | 0 | 0 | 1 | 1 |
| Totals (4 entries) | | 2 | 2 | 2 | 6 |

=== Medal events ===
| Event | Gold | Silver | Bronze |
|---|---|---|---|
| Men | Hungary (HUN); Botond Barabás; Dávid Bisztritsányi; Márton Bence Chilkó; Balázs Erdélyi; Márton Halek; Zsolt Juhász; Balázs Korényi; Gábor Kovács; Tamás Mezei; Balázs Somogyi; Dávid Szécsi; Ádám Szentesi; Márton Tóth | Russia (RUS); Stepan Andrukov; Artem Ashaev; Victor Buyak; Kirill Korneev; Evgeniy Kostrov; Adel Latypov; Nikolay Lazarev; Sergei Lisunov; Ivan Nagaev; Artem Odintsov; Aleksei Rizov-Alenichev; Vladislav Timakov; Albert Zinnatullin | Serbia (SRB); Mateja Asanović; Nikola Dedović; Marko Draksimović; Dušan Marković; Mihajlo Milićević; Miloš Miličić; Boris Popović; Ivan Rackov; Strahinja Rašović; Nenad Stojčić; Boris Vapenski; Srđan Vuksanović; Stefan Živojinović |
| Women | Russia (RUS); Alexandra Antonova; Diana Antonova; Olga Beliaeva; Anna Grineva; Evgeniya Ivanova; Elvina Karimova; Anna Karnaukh; Ksenia Krimer; Ekaterina Lisunova; Nataliya Perfilieva; Ekaterina Prokofyeva; Anna Ustukhina; Ekaterina Zelentsova | Hungary (HUN); Lilla Árkosy; Dóra Csabai; Petra Dalmády; Szandra Kata Dalmády; Edina Gangl; Alexa Anett Gémes; Diána Ágnes Gundl; Anita Hevesi; Hanna Anna Kisteleki; Laura Kocsis; Bianka Pócsi; Noémi Somhegyi; Hanna Zajacz | Italy (ITA); Giulia Bartolini; Laura Barzon; Martina Bencardino; Laura Drocco; Gloria Giachi; Giulia Gorlero; Alessia Millo; Silvia Motta; Martina Savioli; Ilaria Savioli; Laura Teani; Medea Verde; Martina Verducci |

== Men ==
Twelve teams participated in the men's tournament.

=== Teams ===
Pool A

- Russia
- Japan
- Hungary
- Australia
- Canada
- Georgia

Pool B

- Serbia
- United States
- Italy
- Brazil
- Montenegro
- Belgium

== Women ==
Eight teams participated in the women's tournament.

=== Teams ===
Pool A

- Russia
- Italy
- Canada
- Japan

Pool B

- United States
- Australia
- France
- Hungary
