= Water polo at the 2019 Summer Universiade =

Water polo at the XXX Summer Universiade
- Venue: various
- Dates: 2–14 July
- Teams: 10 (per gender)

Water polo at the 2019 Summer Universiade in Naples was played between 2 and 14 July. 20 teams participated in the tournament.

== Medal summary ==
=== Medal table ===
Rank	Nation	Gold	Silver	Bronze	Total
1	Italy (ITA)*	1	1	0	2
2	Hungary (HUN)	1	0	1	2
3	United States (USA)	0	1	0	1
4	Russia (RUS)	0	0	1	1
Totals (4 entries)		2	2	2	6

=== Medal events ===
Event	Gold	Silver	Bronze
Men	Italy (ITA); Pierre Pellegrini; Mario Del Basso; Giacomo Cannella; Matteo Spione; Federico Panerai; Eduardo Campopiano; Mario Guidi; Lorenzo Bruni; Jacopo Alesiani; Massimo Di Martire; Ettore Novara; Umberto Esposito; Francesco Massaro	United States (USA); Jack Turner; Tyler Abramson; Felix Brozyna-Vilim; Jacob Cavano; Jacob Ehrhardt; Kacper Langiewicz; Thomas Gruwell; Evan Rosenfeld; AJ Rossman; Bennett Williams; Quinn Woodhead; Samuel Krutonog	Hungary (HUN); István Kardos; Gergerly Buriàn; Lóránd Zerinváry; Domonkos Sélley-Rauscher; Kristóf Várnai; Dániel Sánta; Kristóf Szatmáry; Erik Csacsovszky; Tamás Gyárfás; Frank Pellei; Róbert Fejős; Rolf Bencz; Dániel Szakonyi
Women	Hungary (HUN); Alexandra Kiss; Gerda Brezovszki; Tamara Farkas; Gemma Matilda Gerendás; Orsolya Hertzka; Vivien Kövesdi; Alexa Gémes; Krisztina Garda; Dóra Huszti; Anna Mandula Mucsy; Szonja Kuna; Zsuzsanna Máté; Gina Lekrinszki	Italy (ITA); Fabiana Soprano; Carolina Ioannou; Martina Gottardo; Giulia Cuzzupè; Chiara Ranalli; Giulia Millo; Elena Borg; Luna Di Claudio; Anna Repetto; Serena Storai; Sara Centanni; Agnese Cocchiere; Carlotta Malara	Russia (RUS); Diana Khamraeva; Polina Kempf; Elizaveta Zaplatina; Margarita Pystina; Anastasiia Diachenko; Polina Popova; Daria Chagochkina; Anastasia Leonova; Regina Galimzianova; Alina Inogamova; Liubov Mekhteleva; Nadezhda Lipskaia; Svetlana Stepakhina

== Qualification ==
Following the FISU regulations, the maximum of 12 teams in water polo events where the number of entries is larger than the authorised participation level were selected by:

- The entry and the payment of guarantee.
- Those 5 teams finishing top rankings of the previous edition will be automatically qualified.
- Those 3 teams finishing bottom rankings of the previous edition will be replaced by new applying teams.
- The host is automatically qualified
- The remaining teams will be selected by wild card system according to geographical, continental representation, FISU ranking and FINA ranking.

=== Men's tournament ===
Means of qualification	Date	Venue	Vacancies	Qualified
Host Country	—	—	1	Italy
Top three of previous edition	18–30 August 2017	(Taiwan) Taipei	3	Russia; France; Hungary
Continental Quota	—	—	4	Australia; Japan; Great Britain; United States
Wild card	—	—	2	Croatia; South Korea
Total			10	

=== Women's tournament ===
Means of qualification	Date	Venue	Vacancies	Qualified
Host Country	—	—	1	Italy
Top five of previous edition	18–29 August 2017	(Taiwan) Taipei	5	United States; Hungary; Japan; Russia; Canada
Continental Quota	—	—	2	Australia; China
Wild card	—	—	2	Czech Republic; France
Total			10	

== Venues ==
Five swimming pools have been selected to host the Universiade (three for the competitions and two as training facilities):

- Stadio del Nuoto, Caserta: men's preliminary round and quarterfinals.
- Piscina comunale Alba Oriens, Casoria: women's preliminary round and quarterfinals.
- Piscina Felice Scandone, Naples: semifinals and finals.

Training pools:

- PalaDennerlein, Naples (men).
- Piscina Comunale, Santa Maria Capua Vetere (women).

== Draw ==
Draws for team sports competitions were held on 5 April 2019 in Naples. According to FISU regulations, draw of pools was based on the following criteria:

- Previous Summer Universiade results
- Participation in previous Summer Universiades
- Continental representation
- FINA rankings

=== Men's tournament ===
Pot 1	Pot 2	Pot 3	Pot 4	Pot 5
Russia (2); Italy (3)	France (4); Hungary (5)	Japan (5); United States (9)	Great Britain (8); Croatia (10)	Australia (11); South Korea (12)

=== Women's tournament ===
Pot 1	Pot 2	Pot 3	Pot 4	Pot 5
United States (1); Hungary (2)	Japan (3); Russia (4)	Canada (5); Australia (6)	France (7); Italy (8)	China (?); Czech Republic (?)

=== Pools composition ===
Men's tournament		Women's tournament	
Pool A	Pool B	Pool A	Pool B
Russia	Croatia	Hungary	United States
United States	Italy	Canada	Australia
France	Hungary	Czech Republic	Italy
South Korea	Japan	Japan	China
Great Britain	Australia	France	Russia
