= Nuzgari Mshvenieradze =

Soviet water polo player

Nugzari Mshvenieradze
Personal information
- Full name: Nugzari Mshvenieradze
- Nationality: Soviet
- Born: 25 June 1952 (age 74) Moscow, Russian SFSR, Soviet Union

Sport
- Sport: Water polo
Medal record
Representing Soviet Union
Summer Universiade
Gold medal – first place	1973 Moscow	Team competition
World Championships
Silver medal – second place	1973 Belgrade	Team competition
European Championships
Gold medal – first place	1983 Rome	Team competition
Gold medal – first place	1985 Sofia	Team competition
Gold medal – first place	1987 Strasbourg	Team competition
- Updated on 11 August 2023

Nugzari Mshvenieradze (born 25 June 1952) is a Soviet water polo player. He competed in the men's tournament at the 1976 Summer Olympics.

== See also ==
- List of World Aquatics Championships medalists in water polo
