= Water polo at the 1970 Summer Universiade =

Water polo at the VI Summer Universiade

Medalists
1st place, gold medalist(s)		Soviet Union
2nd place, silver medalist(s)		Italy
3rd place, bronze medalist(s)		Hungary

Water polo events were contested at the 1970 Summer Universiade in Turin, Italy.

Event	Gold	Silver	Bronze
Men's	Soviet Union (URS); Yury Mityanin; Nikolai Melnikov; Aleksandr Kabanov; Leonid Tishchenko; Sergei Bondarenko; Aleksandr Zelentsov; Vladimir Kovel; Vitaliy Romanchuk coach: Mikhail Ryzhak	Italy (ITA)	Hungary (HUN)
