= Aleksandr Kabanov =

Russian water polo player (1948–2020)

Personal information
- Born: 14 June 1948 Moscow, Russian SFSR, Soviet Union
- Died: 30 June 2020 (aged 72)
Medal record
Men's water polo
Representing Soviet Union
Olympic Games
Gold medal – first place	1972 Munich	Team competition
Gold medal – first place	1980 Moscow	Team competition
World Championships
Gold medal – first place	1975 Cali	Team competition
Gold medal – first place	1982 Guayaquil	Team competition
Silver medal – second place	1973 Belgrade	Team competition
Summer Universiade
Gold medal – first place	1970 Turin	Team
Gold medal – first place	1973 Moscow	Team
European Championships
Gold medal – first place	1983 Rome	Team competition
Silver medal – second place	1981 Split	Team competition
- Updated on 11 August 2023

Aleksandr Sergeyevich Kabanov (Russian: Александр Серге́евич Кабанов, 14 June 1948 – 30 June 2020) was a Soviet and Russian water polo player and head coach of the Russian water polo team. He is one of a few sportspeople who won Olympic medals in water polo as players and head coaches.

Kabanov died on 30 June 2020, aged 72.

== Achievements ==
- Gold in the 1972 Munich Olympics
- Gold in the Water Polo World Championship in Cali 1975
- Gold in the 1980 Moscow Olympics
- Gold in the 1981 FINA Men's Water Polo World Cup
- Silver in the European water polo championship Split 1981
- Gold in the 1982 FINA Men's World Water Polo Championship
- Gold in the 1983 FINA Men's Water Polo World Cup

In 1972 Kabanov was awarded the title of Honoured Master of Sport of the USSR. He graduated from Armenian State Institute of Physical Culture and Sport in 1984.

== Books ==
- Kabanov, Aleksandr (1988). Мяч на воде [The ball on the water] (in Russian). Fizkultura i sport.

== See also ==
- Russia men's Olympic water polo team records and statistics
- Soviet Union men's Olympic water polo team records and statistics
- List of Olympic champions in men's water polo
- List of Olympic medalists in water polo (men)
- List of world champions in men's water polo
- List of World Aquatics Championships medalists in water polo
- List of members of the International Swimming Hall of Fame
