= Vladimir Iselidze =

Soviet water polo player

Personal information
- Nationality: Soviet
- Born: 25 November 1948 (age 77) Tbilisi, Georgia

Sport
- Sport: Water polo
Medal record
Men's Water polo
Representing Soviet Union
Universiade
| Gold medal – first place | 1973 Moscow | Team |
- Updated on 11 August 2023

Vladimir Iselidze (born 25 November 1948) is a Soviet water polo player. He competed in the men's tournament at the 1976 Summer Olympics.
