= Water polo at the 1973 Summer Universiade =

Water polo at the VII Summer Universiade

Medalists
1st place, gold medalist(s)		Soviet Union
2nd place, silver medalist(s)		Cuba
3rd place, bronze medalist(s)		United States

Water polo events were contested at the 1973 Summer Universiade in Moscow, Soviet Union.

Event	Gold	Silver	Bronze
Men's	Soviet Union (URS); Yury Mityanin; Nikolai Melnikov; Aleksandr Kabanov; Leonid Tishchenko; Sergei Bondarenko; Nuzgari Mshvenieradze; Aleksandr Zelentsov; Eduard Aleksandrov; Vladimir Kovel; Vladimir Iselidze; Vitaliy Romanchuk coach: Mikhail Ryzhak	Cuba (CUB)	United States (USA)
