= Nikolay Melnikov (water polo) =

Soviet water polo player

Personal information
- Nationality: Russian
- Born: 24 January 1948 (age 78) Soviet Union

Sport
- Sport: Water polo
Medal record
Men's Water polo
Representing Soviet Union
Summer Olympics
Gold medal – first place	1972 Munich	Team competition
World Championships
Gold medal – first place	1975 Cali	Team competition
Universiade
Gold medal – first place	1970 Turin	Team
Gold medal – first place	1973 Moscow	Team
- Updated on 2 May 2024

Nikolai Andreyevich Melnikov (Russian: Николай Андреевич Мельников; born 24 January 1948) is a former water polo player for the Soviet Union. He is Jewish, and was born in Moscow, Russia. He won a gold medal at the 1972 Olympics in Munich.

== See also ==
- Soviet Union men's Olympic water polo team records and statistics
- List of Olympic champions in men's water polo
- List of Olympic medalists in water polo (men)
- List of world champions in men's water polo
- List of World Aquatics Championships medalists in water polo
- List of select Jewish water polo players
