= Ruzsky District =

Ruzsky District Рузский район (Russian)
- District
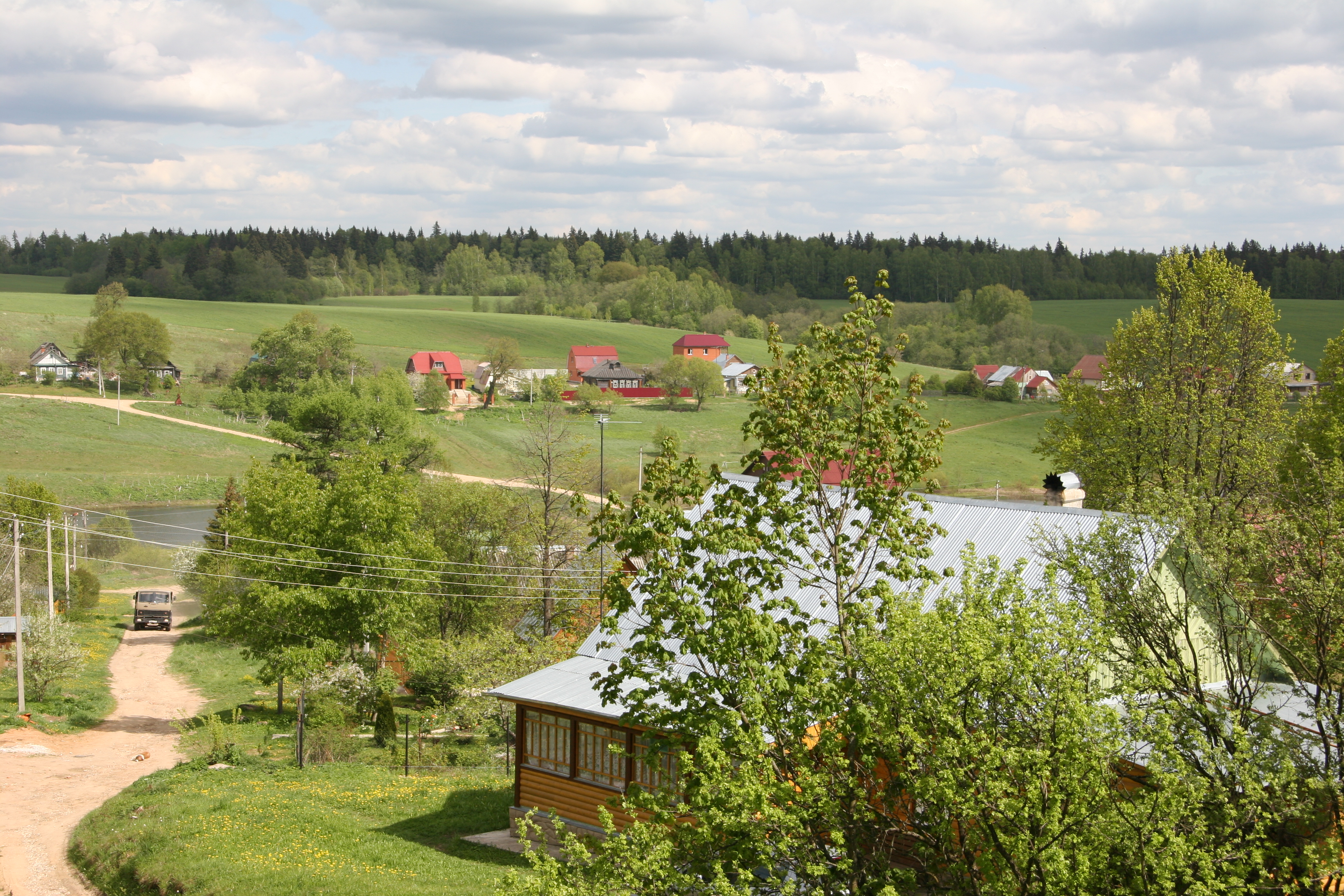
- Annino, Ruzsky District

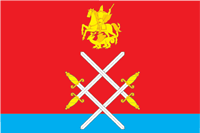
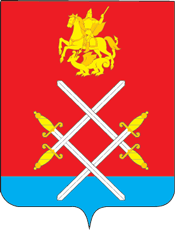
- Flag Coat of arms
- Location of Ruzsky District in Moscow Oblast (before July 2012)
- Coordinates: 55°42′N 36°12′E
- Country: Russia
- Federal subject: Moscow Oblast
- Established: 12 July 1929
- Administrative center: Ruza

Area
  - Total: 1,567.56 km^{2} (605.24 sq mi)

Population (2010 Census)
  - Total: 61,673
  - Density: 39.343/km^{2} (101.90/sq mi)
  - Urban: 50.1%
  - Rural: 49.9%

Administrative structure
  - Administrative divisions: 1 Towns, 1 Work settlements, 5 Rural settlements
  - Inhabited localities: 1 cities/towns, 1 urban-type settlements, 228 rural localities

Municipal structure
  - Municipally incorporated as: Ruzsky Municipal District
  - Municipal divisions: 2 urban settlements, 5 rural settlements
- Time zone: UTC+3 (MSK)
- OKTMO ID: 46766000
- Website: http://www.ruzaregion.ru/

Ruzsky District (Russian: Ру́зский райо́н) is an administrative and municipal district (raion), one of the thirty-six in Moscow Oblast, Russia. It is located in the west of the oblast. The area of the district is 1,567.56 square kilometers (605.24 sq mi). Its administrative center is the town of Ruza. Population: 61,673 (2010 Census); 63,685 (2002 census); 67,533 (1989 Soviet census). The population of Ruza accounts for 21.9% of the district's total population.
