= Water polo at the 1967 Summer Universiade =

Water polo at the V Summer Universiade

Medalists
1st place, gold medalist(s)		Japan
2nd place, silver medalist(s)		United States
3rd place, bronze medalist(s)		Italy

Water polo was contested for men only at the 1967 Summer Universiade in Tokyo, Japan.

Event	Gold	Silver	Bronze
Men's	Japan (JPN)	United States (USA)	Italy (ITA)
