= Water polo at the 1983 Summer Universiade =

Water polo at the XII Summer Universiade

Medalists
1st place, gold medalist(s)		Soviet Union
2nd place, silver medalist(s)		United States
3rd place, bronze medalist(s)		Cuba

Water polo events were contested at the 1983 Summer Universiade in Edmonton, Alberta, Canada.

Event	Gold	Silver	Bronze
Men's	Soviet Union (URS)	United States (USA)	Cuba (CUB)
