= Water polo at the 1961 Summer Universiade =

Water polo at the II Summer Universiade

Medalists
| 1st place, gold medalist(s) | | Yugoslavia |
| 2nd place, silver medalist(s) | | Soviet Union |
| 3rd place, bronze medalist(s) | | Hungary |

Water polo events were contested at the 1961 Summer Universiade in Sofia, Bulgaria.

| Event | Gold | Silver | Bronze |
|---|---|---|---|
| Men's | Yugoslavia (YUG) | Soviet Union (URS) | Hungary (HUN) |
