= Water polo at the 2007 Summer Universiade =

Water polo at the XXIV Summer Universiade

Medalists
1st place, gold medalist(s)		Montenegro
2nd place, silver medalist(s)		Italy
3rd place, bronze medalist(s)		Hungary

The 2007 Men's Universiade Water Polo Tournament was the 22nd edition of the event at the Summer Universiade. The tournament was held from Friday, August 10 to Friday, August 17, 2007. It took place in Bangkok, Thailand.

== Preliminary round ==
=== Group A ===
	Team	Points	G	W	D	L	GF	GA	Diff
1.	Montenegro	6	3	3	0	0	65	17	+48
2.	Russia	4	3	2	0	1	39	25	+14
3.	Australia	2	3	1	0	2	36	31	+5
4.	Thailand	0	3	0	0	3	16	83	–67

=== Group B ===
	Team	Points	G	W	D	L	GF	GA	Diff
1.	Serbia	6	3	3	0	0	39	15	+24
2.	Great Britain	4	3	2	0	1	32	28	+4
3.	Japan	2	3	1	0	2	25	21	+4
4.	South Africa	0	3	0	0	3	15	47	–32

=== Group C ===
	Team	Points	G	W	D	L	GF	GA	Diff
1.	Hungary	5	3	2	1	0	46	25	+21
2.	France	5	3	2	1	0	45	28	+17
3.	Spain	2	3	1	0	2	35	26	+9
4.	China	0	3	0	0	3	16	63	–47

=== Group D ===
	Team	Points	G	W	D	L	GF	GA	Diff
1.	Italy	4	2	2	0	0	27	9	+18
2.	Turkey	2	2	1	0	1	13	16	–3
3.	Kazakhstan	0	2	0	0	2	9	24	–15

== Second round ==
=== Group E ===
	Team	Points	G	W	D	L	GF	GA	Diff
13.	China	4	2	2	0	0	29	21	+8
14.	South Africa	2	2	1	0	1	31	20	+11
15.	Thailand	0	2	0	0	2	16	35	–19

== Play-offs ==
Russia	4 – 7	Japan
Australia	6 – 5	Great Britain
France	16 – 4	Kazakhstan
Spain	14 – 5	Turkey

Russia	9 – 11	Kazakhstan
Great Britain	6 – 9	Turkey

Montenegro	9 – 6	France
Serbia	8 – 9	Spain
Hungary	11 – 6	Japan
Italy	19 – 7	Australia

France	6 – 7	Serbia
Japan	14 – 7	Australia

Montenegro	11 – 6	Spain
Hungary	6 – 14	Italy

== Finals ==
- 11th place

Russia	17 – 9	Great Britain

- 9th place

Kazakhstan	7 – 10	Turkey

- 7th place

France	12 – 8	Australia

- 5th place

Serbia	15 – 6	Japan

- Bronze medal match

Hungary	9 – 8	Spain

- Gold medal match

Montenegro	11 – 8	Italy

== Final ranking ==
Rank	Team
	Montenegro
	Italy
	Hungary
4.	Spain
5.	Serbia
6.	Japan
7.	France
8.	Australia
9.	Turkey
10.	Kazakhstan
11.	Russia
12.	Great Britain
13.	China
14.	South Africa
15.	Thailand

2007 Summer Universiade winners

Montenegro
First title

== Individual awards ==
- Most Valuable Player
- Best Goalkeeper
- Best Scorer
