= Hungarian water polo league system =

The Hungarian water polo league system, or Hungarian water polo league pyramid is a series of interconnected competitions for professional water polo clubs in Hungary. The system has a hierarchical format with a promotion and demotion system between competitions at different levels.

== Men ==
=== The tier levels ===
For the 2015–16 season, the Hungarian water polo league system is as follows:

Level Clubs	Divisions			
1; 16	Országos Bajnokság I (OB I) (e·on Férfi OB I Osztályú Országos Bajnokság); 2 groups of 8 teams – 1 relegation + 1 relegation playoff			
2; 20	Országos Bajnokság I/B (OB I/B); 2 groups of 10 teams – 1 promotion + 1 promotion playoff, 2 relegation			
3; 24	Országos Bajnokság II (OB II); West; 6 clubs – 1 promotion championship	Országos Bajnokság II (OB II); Middle; 6 clubs – 1 promotion championship	Országos Bajnokság II (OB II); North-east; 6 clubs – 1 promotion championship	Országos Bajnokság II (OB II); South-east; 7 clubs – 1 promotion championship

== Cup competitions ==
- Magyar Kupa (men's water polo) (Férfi Magyar Kupa)
- Magyar Kupa (women's water polo) (Női Magyar Kupa)
