= Water polo at the 1985 Summer Universiade =

Water polo at the XIII Summer Universiade

Medalists
1st place, gold medalist(s)		Soviet Union
2nd place, silver medalist(s)		Yugoslavia
3rd place, bronze medalist(s)		Cuba

Water polo events were contested at the 1985 Summer Universiade in Kobe, Japan.

Event	Gold	Silver	Bronze
Men's	Soviet Union (URS)	Yugoslavia (YUG)	Cuba (CUB)
