= Water polo at the 1977 Summer Universiade =

Water polo at the IX Summer Universiade

Medalists
1st place, gold medalist(s)		Romania
2nd place, silver medalist(s)		Hungary
3rd place, bronze medalist(s)		Italy

Water polo events were contested at the 1977 Summer Universiade in Sofia, Bulgaria.

Event	Gold	Silver	Bronze
Men's	Romania (ROU)	Hungary (HUN)	Italy (ITA)

== Final standings ==
1. Romania
2. Hungary
3. Italy
4. (Socialist Federal Republic of Yugoslavia) Yugoslavia
5. Bulgaria
6. United States
7. Soviet Union
8. Mexico
9. Cuba
10. West Germany
11. Canada
12. Brazil
13. Japan
