= Water polo at the 2005 Summer Universiade =

Water polo at the XXIII Summer Universiade

Medalists
1st place, gold medalist(s)		Serbia and Montenegro
2nd place, silver medalist(s)		Hungary
3rd place, bronze medalist(s)		Turkey

Water polo events were contested at the 2005 Summer Universiade in İzmir, Turkey.

Event	Gold	Silver	Bronze
Men's	Serbia and Montenegro (SCG)	Hungary (HUN)	Turkey (TUR)
