= Water polo at the 1999 Summer Universiade =

Water polo at the XX Summer Universiade

Medalists
1st place, gold medalist(s)		Spain
2nd place, silver medalist(s)		Italy
3rd place, bronze medalist(s)		Hungary

Water polo events were contested at the 1999 Summer Universiade in Palma de Mallorca, Spain.

Event	Gold	Silver	Bronze
Men's	Spain (ESP)	Italy (ITA)	Hungary (HUN)
