= Water polo at the 1963 Summer Universiade =

Water polo at the III Summer Universiade

Medalists
1st place, gold medalist(s)		Hungary
2nd place, silver medalist(s)		Soviet Union
3rd place, bronze medalist(s)		Brazil

Water polo events were contested at the 1963 Summer Universiade in Porto Alegre, Brazil.

Event	Gold	Silver	Bronze
Men's	Hungary (HUN)	Soviet Union (URS)	Brazil (BRA)
