= Water polo at the 1959 Summer Universiade =

Water polo at the I Summer Universiade
- Teams: 7

Medalists
1st place, gold medalist(s)		Yugoslavia
2nd place, silver medalist(s)		Hungary
3rd place, bronze medalist(s)		Italy

The water polo event was contested at the 1959 Summer Universiade in Turin, Italy. Seven teams competed in the event with Yugoslavia winning the gold medal after winning all three of their matches in the final group.

== Preliminary round ==
=== Group A ===
Team	Pld	W	D	L	GF	GA	GD	Pts
Hungary	3	2	1	0	31	15	+16	5
Italy	3	2	1	0	22	2	+20	5
Netherlands	3	1	0	2	19	6	+13	2
Ireland	3	0	0	3	0	52	−52	0

28 August; 18:00	Hungary	6–3	Netherlands

28 August; 22:15	Netherlands	20–0	Ireland

29 August; 08:00	Hungary	23–0	Ireland

29 August	Italy	W–L	Netherlands

30 August	Netherlands	16–0	Ireland

30 August	Hungary	2–2	Italy

=== Group B ===
Team	Pld	W	D	L	GF	GA	GD	Pts
Yugoslavia	2	2	0	0	6	1	+5	4
Germany	2	1	0	1	5	3	+2	2
Romania	2	0	0	2	3	5	−2	0

- Note: Spain was also included in this group but had to withdraw from the competition.

28 August; 11:00	Germany	5–3	Romania

29 August; 21:15	Yugoslavia	W–L	Romania

30 August	Yugoslavia	6–1	Germany

Event	Gold	Silver	Bronze
Men's	Yugoslavia (YUG)	Hungary (HUN)	Italy (ITA)
