= Ruza, Ruzsky District, Moscow Oblast =

Town in Moscow Oblast, Russia

Ruza Руза
- Town
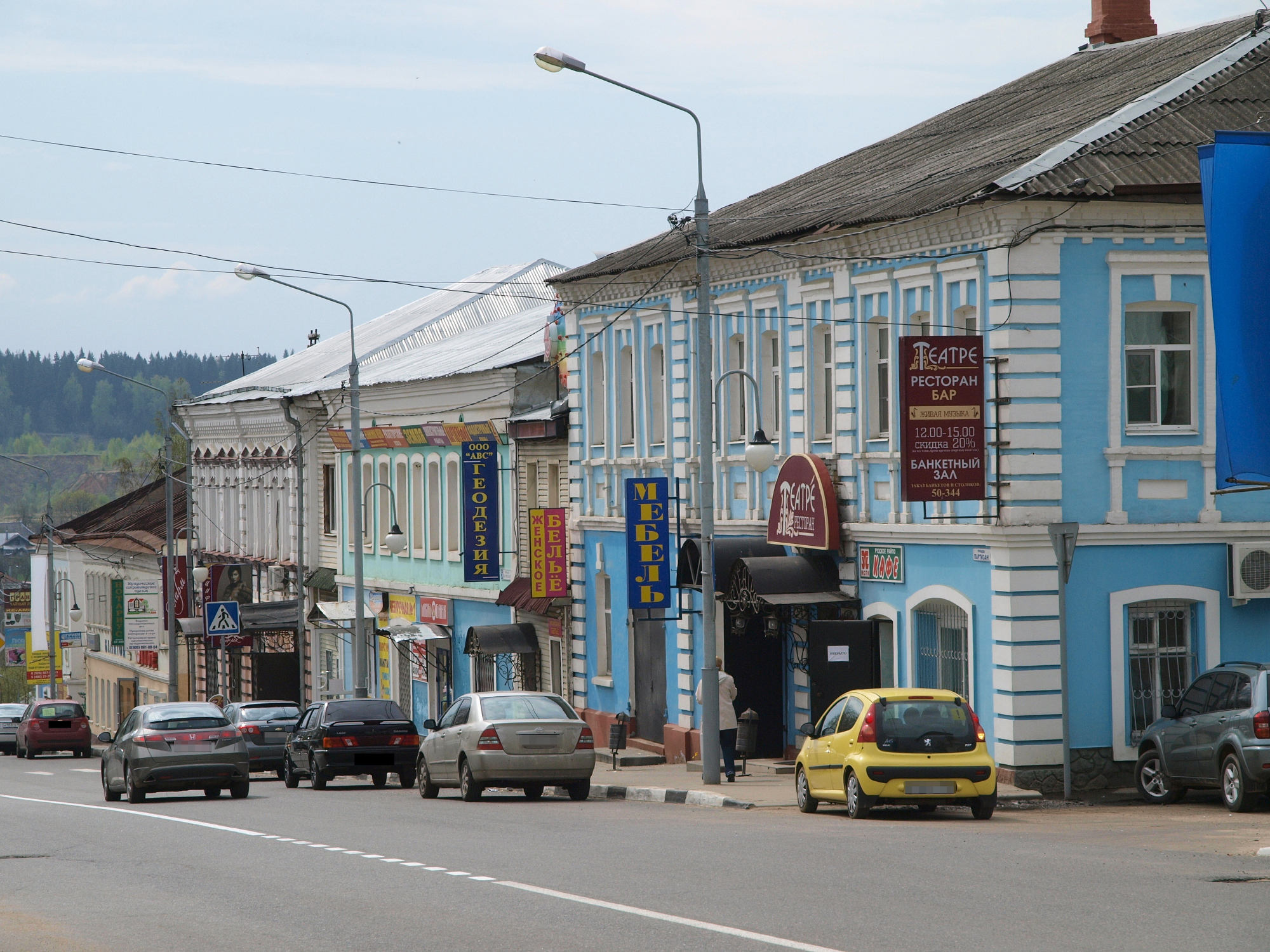
- Solntseva Street in Ruza

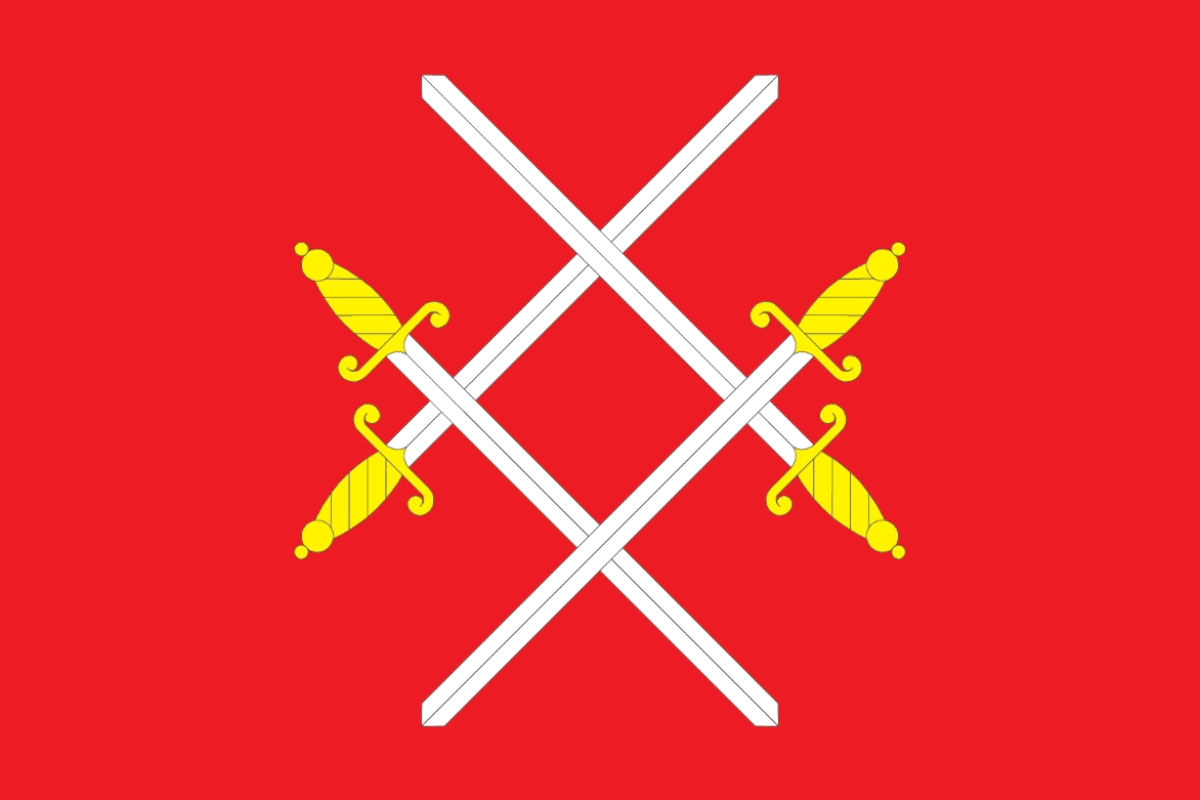
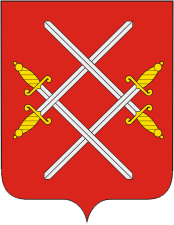
- Flag Coat of arms
- Interactive map of Ruza
- Location of Ruza Ruza (Moscow Oblast)
- Coordinates: 55°42′N 36°12′E
- Country: Russia
- Federal subject: Moscow Oblast
- Administrative district: Ruzsky District
- TownSelsoviet: Ruza
- First mentioned: 1339
- Elevation: 190 m (620 ft)

Population (2010 Census)
  - Total: 13,495
  - Estimate (2025): 15,071 (+11.7%)

Administrative status
  - Capital of: Ruzsky District, Town of Ruza

Municipal status
  - Municipal district: Ruzsky Municipal District
  - Urban settlement: Ruza Urban Settlement
  - Capital of: Ruzsky Municipal District, Ruza Urban Settlement
- Time zone: UTC+3 (MSK)
- Postal codes: 143100, 143103, 143108
- OKTMO ID: 46566000001
- Website: www.ruza-gp.ru

Ruza (Russian: Ру́за) is a town and the administrative center of Ruzsky District in Moscow Oblast, Russia, located on the Ruza River (a tributary of the Moskva River) 100 kilometers (62 mi) west of Moscow. Population: 13,495 (2010 census); 13,516 (2002 census); 14,643 (1989 Soviet census).

== History ==
It was first mentioned in 1339, as a part of the Principality of Zvenigorod. It became a part of the Grand Duchy of Moscow in the early 16th century. The town was a fortress which protected Moscow from the west. During World War II, Ruza was occupied by the Germans from October 25, 1941, to January 17, 1942.

== Administrative and municipal status ==
Within the framework of administrative divisions, Ruza serves as the administrative center of Ruzsky District. As an administrative division, it is incorporated within Ruzsky District as the Town of Ruza. As a municipal division, the Town of Ruza is incorporated within Ruzsky Municipal District as Ruza Urban Settlement.

== Notable people ==
- Sergey Ivanov (1864–1910), painter
- Aleksandr Shcherbakov (1901–1945), politician
