= Water polo at the 1991 Summer Universiade =

Water polo at the XVI Summer Universiade

Medalists
1st place, gold medalist(s)		United States
2nd place, silver medalist(s)		China
3rd place, bronze medalist(s)		Italy

Water polo events were contested at the 1991 Summer Universiade in Sheffield, England.

Event	Gold	Silver	Bronze
Men's	United States (USA)	China (CHN)	Italy (ITA)
