= Water polo at the 1965 Summer Universiade =

Water polo at the IV Summer Universiade

Medalists
1st place, gold medalist(s)		Hungary
2nd place, silver medalist(s)		Soviet Union
3rd place, bronze medalist(s)		Romania

Water polo events were contested at the 1965 Summer Universiade in Budapest, Hungary.

Event	Gold	Silver	Bronze
Men's	Hungary (HUN)	Soviet Union (URS)	Romania (ROU)
