= Water polo at the 2001 Summer Universiade =

Water polo at the XXI Summer Universiade

Medalists
1st place, gold medalist(s)		Italy
2nd place, silver medalist(s)		Russia
3rd place, bronze medalist(s)		Hungary

Water polo events were contested at the 2001 Summer Universiade in Beijing, China.

Event	Gold	Silver	Bronze
Men's	Italy (ITA)	Russia (RUS)	Hungary (HUN)
