= Mikhail Ryzhak =

Soviet water polo player

Personal information
- Nationality: Russian
- Born: 10 March 1927 Soviet Union
- Died: 25 March 2003 (aged 76)

Sport
- Sport: Water polo
Medal record
Men's Water polo
Representing Soviet Union
Summer Olympics
| Bronze medal – third place | 1956 Melbourne | Team competition |

Mikhail Mikhaylovich Ryzhak (Russian: Михаил Михайлович Рыжак, 10 March 1927 – 25 March 2003) was a Ukrainian water polo player who competed for the Soviet Union in the 1956 Summer Olympics. He was born in Kharkiv, Ukrainian SSR. Ryzhak was part of the Soviet team which won the bronze medal in the 1956 tournament. He played one match as goalkeeper.

== See also ==
- Soviet Union men's Olympic water polo team records and statistics
- List of Olympic medalists in water polo (men)
- List of men's Olympic water polo tournament goalkeepers
