= Sergey Lisunov =

Croatian water polo player

Personal information
- Nationality: Russian
- Born: 12 October 1986 (age 39) Volgograd, Soviet Union
- Height: 6 ft 6 in (1.98 m)
- Weight: 251 lb (114 kg)
- Spouse: Ekaterina

Sport
- Country: Russia
- Sport: Water polo
- Club: WPC Dynamo Moscow
Medal record
Men's water polo
Representing Russia
Universiade
Silver medal – second place	2011 Shenzhen	Team

Sergey Lisunov (born October 12, 1986) is a Russian professional water polo player. He is currently playing for WPC Dynamo Moscow. He is 6 ft 6 in (1.98 m) tall and weighs 251 lb (114 kg).

== Family ==
He is married to the water polo player Ekaterina Lisunova, they have a son.
