= 1997 FINA Men's Water Polo World Cup =

- League: FINA Water Polo World Cup
- Sport: Water polo
- Duration: 27 April - 1 May

Super Final
- Finals champions: United States
- Runners-up: Greece

FINA Water Polo World Cup seasons
- ← 1995 1999 →

The 1997 FINA Men's Water Polo World Cup was the tenth edition of the event, organised by the world's governing body in aquatics, the International Swimming Federation (FINA). The event took place in Athens, Greece. Eight teams participated to decide the winner of what would be a bi-annual event until 1999.

== Teams ==
The top eight teams from the previous Olympic Games have qualified.

Teams	Qualified as
Greece; Spain; Croatia; Italy; Hungary; Russia; United States; Yugoslavia	Host (6th 1996 Olympic Games); 1st 1996 Olympic Games; 2nd 1996 Olympic Games; 3rd 1996 Olympic Games; 4th 1996 Olympic Games; 5th 1996 Olympic Games; 7th 1996 Olympic Games; 8th 1996 Olympic Games

== Seeding ==
Following ranking of the 1996 Olympic Games

Pot 1	Pot 2	Pot 3	Pot 4
Spain (1); Croatia (2)	Italy (3); Hungary (4)	Russia (5); Greece (6) (H)	United States (7); FR Yugoslavia (8)

== Groups ==
Group A	Group B
Croatia; Hungary; Russia; Yugoslavia	Spain; Italy; Greece (H); United States

== Preliminary round ==
=== GROUP A ===
	Team	Points	G	W	D	L	GF	GA	Diff	Qualification
1.	Hungary	5	3	2	1	0	24	14	+10	Semi-finals
2.	Russia	3	3	1	1	1	20	17	+3	Semi-finals
3.	Croatia	2	3	1	0	2	16	24	–8	5th–8th place
4.	Yugoslavia	2	3	1	0	2	17	22	–5	5th–8th place

- Tuesday 27 May 1997

Hungary	11 – 6	Croatia
Yugoslavia	9 – 7	Russia

- Wednesday 28 May 1997

Hungary	10 – 5	Yugoslavia
Russia	10 – 5	Croatia

- Thursday 29 May 1997

Croatia	5 – 3	Yugoslavia
Hungary	3 – 3	Russia

=== GROUP B ===
	Team	Points	G	W	D	L	GF	GA	Diff	Qualification
1.	United States	5	3	2	1	0	25	21	+4	Semi-finals
2.	Greece	5	3	2	1	0	21	18	+3	Semi-finals
3.	Italy	1	3	0	1	2	18	21	–3	5th–8th place
4.	Spain	1	3	0	1	2	21	25	–4	5th–8th place

- Tuesday 27 May 1997

United States	10 – 7	Spain
Greece	6 – 4	Italy

- Wednesday 28 May 1997

United States	7 – 6	Italy
Greece	7 – 6	Spain

- Thursday 29 May 1997

Italy	8 – 8	Spain
United States	8 – 8	Spain

== 5th–8th place semifinals ==
- Saturday 31 May 1997

Croatia	9 – 10	Spain
Italy	10 – 9	Yugoslavia

== Semi-finals ==
- Saturday 31 May 1997

Hungary	4 – 8	Greece
United States	9 – 8	Russia

== Seventh place ==
- Sunday 1 June 1997

Croatia	5 – 6	Yugoslavia

== Fifth place ==
- Sunday 1 June 1997

Spain	5 – 9	Italy

== Third place ==
- Sunday 1 June 1997

Hungary	10 – 7	Russia

== FINAL ==
- Sunday 1 June 1997

Greece	5 – 8	United States

== Final ranking ==
RANK	TEAM
1st place, gold medalist(s)	United States
2nd place, silver medalist(s)	Greece
3rd place, bronze medalist(s)	Hungary
4.	Russia
5.	Italy
6.	Spain
7.	Yugoslavia
8.	Croatia

1997 Men's FINA World Cup winners

United States
Second title
