= Water polo at the 1981 Summer Universiade =

Water polo at the XI Summer Universiade

Medalists
1st place, gold medalist(s)		Cuba
2nd place, silver medalist(s)		United States
3rd place, bronze medalist(s)		Romania

Water polo events were contested at the 1981 Summer Universiade in Bucharest, Romania.

Event	Gold	Silver	Bronze
Men's	Cuba (CUB)	United States (USA)	Romania (ROU)
