= 1993 FINA Men's Water Polo World Cup =

- League: FINA Water Polo World Cup
- Sport: Water polo

Super Final

FINA Water Polo World Cup seasons
- ← 1991 1995 →

The 1993 FINA Men's Water Polo World Cup was the eighth edition of the event, organised by the world's governing body in aquatics, the International Swimming Federation (FINA). The event took place in Athens, Greece. Eight teams participated to decide the winner of what would be a bi-annual event until 1999.

== Teams ==
Host Greece and the top seven teams from the previous Olympic Games have qualified.

Teams	Qualified as
Greece; Italy (Spain); Russia; United States; Australia; Hungary; Germany; Cuba	Host (10th 1992 Olympics Games); 1st 1992 Olympics Games; 2nd 1992 Olympics Games; 3rd 1992 Olympics Games; 4th 1992 Olympics Games; 5th 1992 Olympics Games; 6th 1992 Olympics Games; 7th 1996 Olympics Games; 8th 1996 Olympics Games - replace Spain

== Seeding ==
Following ranking of the 1992 Olympics Games

Pot 1	Pot 2	Pot 3	Pot 4
Italy (1); Russia (3)	United States (4); Australia (5)	Hungary (6); Germany (7)	Cuba (8); Greece (10) (H)

== Groups ==
Group A	Group B
Italy; United States; Germany; Cuba	Russia; Australia; Hungary; Greece (H)

== Preliminary round ==
=== GROUP A ===
	Team	Points	G	W	D	L	GF	GA	Diff	Qualification
1.	Italy	6	3	3	0	0	29	15	+14	Semi-finals
2.	United States	3	3	1	1	1	20	24	–4	Semi-finals
3.	Cuba	2	3	1	0	2	18	21	–3	5th–8th place
4.	Germany	1	3	0	1	2	19	26	–7	5th–8th place

Italy	11 – 5	Germany
United States	7 – 6	Cuba

Italy	11 – 6	United States
Germany	7 – 8	Cuba

Italy	7 – 4	Cuba
United States	7 – 7	Germany

=== GROUP B ===
	Team	Points	G	W	D	L	GF	GA	Diff	Qualification
1.	Hungary	6	3	3	0	0	26	20	+6	Semi-finals
2.	Australia	4	3	2	0	1	23	22	+1	Semi-finals
3.	Greece	2	3	1	0	2	20	23	–3	5th–8th place
4.	Russia	0	3	0	0	3	23	27	–4	5th–8th place

Russia	8 – 10	Hungary
Australia	8 – 6	Greece

Russia	9 – 10	Australia
Hungary	9 – 7	Greece

Russia	6 – 7	Greece
Australia	5 – 7	Hungary

== Final ranking ==
RANK	TEAM
1st place, gold medalist(s)	Italy
2nd place, silver medalist(s)	Hungary
3rd place, bronze medalist(s)	Australia
4.	United States
5.	Russia
6.	Germany
7.	Greece
8.	Cuba

1993 Men's FINA World Cup winners

Italy
First title
