= 1995 Men's European Water Polo Championship =

Water sport competitions

The 1995 Men's European Water Polo Championship was the 22nd edition of the bi-annual event, organised by the Europe's governing body in aquatics, the Ligue Européenne de Natation. The event took place in Vienna, Austria from August 18 to August 27, 1995, as an integrated part of the European LC Championships 1995.

== Teams ==
Group A

- Netherlands
- Spain
- Ukraine

Group B

- Austria
- Croatia
- Hungary

Group C

- Bulgaria
- Romania
- Russia

Group D

- Germany
- Italy
- Greece

== First round ==
=== Group A ===
	Team	Points	G	W	D	L	GF	GA	Diff
1.	Spain	4	2	2	0	0	17	12	+5
2.	Ukraine	2	2	1	0	1	16	14	+2
3.	Netherlands	0	2	0	0	2	13	20	−7

Ukraine	6–7	Spain
Netherlands	6–10	Spain
Ukraine	10–7	Netherlands

=== Group B ===
	Team	Points	G	W	D	L	GF	GA	Diff
1.	Hungary	4	2	2	0	0	31	5	+26
2.	Croatia	2	2	1	0	1	31	13	+18
3.	Austria	0	2	0	0	2	2	46	−44

Hungary	20–0	Austria
Croatia	26–2	Austria
Hungary	11–5	Croatia

=== Group C ===
	Team	Points	G	W	D	L	GF	GA	Diff
1.	Russia	4	2	2	0	0	28	15	+13
2.	Bulgaria	1	2	0	1	1	14	18	−4
3.	Romania	1	2	0	1	1	9	18	−9

Russia	14–10	Bulgaria
Bulgaria	4–4	Romania
Romania	5–14	Russia

=== Group D ===
	Team	Points	G	W	D	L	GF	GA	Diff
1.	Italy	4	2	2	0	0	19	13	+6
2.	Germany	2	2	1	0	1	15	18	−3
3.	Greece	0	2	0	0	2	15	18	−3

Italy	9–7	Greece
Germany	6–10	Italy
Greece	8–9	Germany

== Second round ==
=== Group E ===
	Team	Points	G	W	D	L	GF	GA	Diff
1.	Hungary	6	3	3	0	0	45	30	+15
2.	Germany	4	3	2	0	1	33	33	0
3.	Spain	2	3	1	0	2	36	29	+7
4.	Bulgaria	0	3	0	0	3	17	39	−22

Germany	10–5	Bulgaria
Hungary	13–11	Spain

Hungary	14–7	Bulgaria
Spain	10–11	Germany

Hungary	18–12	Germany
Spain	15–5	Bulgaria

=== Group F ===
	Team	Points	G	W	D	L	GF	GA	Diff
1.	Italy	5	3	2	1	0	32	24	+8
2.	Croatia	4	3	1	2	0	29	23	+6
3.	Russia	3	3	1	1	1	30	26	+4
4.	Ukraine	0	3	0	0	3	23	41	−18

Croatia	14–8	Ukraine
Italy	11–9	Russia

Russia	7–7	Croatia
Italy	13–7	Ukraine

Italy	8–8	Croatia
Russia	14–8	Ukraine

=== Group G ===
	Team	Points	G	W	D	L	GF	GA	Diff
9.	Greece	6	3	3	0	0	33	18	+15
10.	Netherlands	4	3	1	1	1	41	19	+22
11.	Romania	2	3	1	0	2	34	27	+7
12.	Austria	0	3	0	0	3	12	56	−44

Netherlands	6–7	Greece
Austria	7–18	Romania

Netherlands	21–3	Austria
Romania	7–9	Greece

Netherlands	14–9	Romania
Austria	5–17	Greece

== Semifinals ==
Italy	10–9	Germany
Hungary	11–8	Croatia

== Finals ==
- August 26, 1995 — Seventh place

Bulgaria	7–9	Ukraine

- August 26, 1995 — Fifth place

Russia	7–10	Spain

- August 27, 1995 — Bronze Medal

Germany	11–10	Croatia

- August 27, 1995 — Gold Medal

Italy	10–8	Hungary

== Final ranking ==
RANK	TEAM
	Italy
	Hungary
	Germany
4.	Croatia
5.	Spain
6.	Russia
7.	Ukraine
8.	Bulgaria
9.	Greece
10.	Netherlands
11.	Romania
12.	Austria

1995 Men's European champion

Italy
Third title

== Individual awards ==
- Most Valuable Player
  - ???
- Best Goalkeeper
  - ???
- Topscorer
  - ???
