= 1995 FINA Men's Water Polo World Cup =

- League: FINA Water Polo World Cup
- Sport: Water polo

Super Final

FINA Water Polo World Cup seasons
- ← 1993 1997 →

The 1995 FINA Men's Water Polo World Cup was the ninth edition of the event, organised by the world's governing body in aquatics, the International Swimming Federation (FINA). The event took place in Atlanta, United States as test event for the 1996 Summer Olympics. Eight teams participated to decide the winner of what would be a bi-annual event until 1999.

== Teams ==
The top eight teams from the previous World Aquatic Championship have qualified.

Teams	Qualified as
United States; Italy; Spain; Russia; Croatia; Hungary; Greece; Netherlands	Host (6th 1994 World Championship); 1st 1994 World Championship; 2nd 1994 World Championship; 3rd 1994 World Championship; 4th 1994 World Championship; 5th 1994 World Championship; 7th 1994 World Championship; 8th 1994 World Championship

== Seeding ==
Following ranking of the 1994 World Championship

Pot 1	Pot 2	Pot 3	Pot 4
Italy (1); Spain (2)	Russia (3); Croatia (4)	Hungary (5); United States (6) (H)	Greece (7); Netherlands (8)

== Groups ==
Group A	Group B
Italy; Croatia; United States (H); Greece	Spain; Russia; Hungary; Netherlands

== Preliminary round ==
=== GROUP A ===
	Team	Points	G	W	D	L	GF	GA	Diff	Qualification
1.	Italy	4	3	2	0	1	24	19	+5	Semi-finals
2.	United States	4	3	2	0	1	20	12	–1	Semi-finals
3.	Croatia	2	3	1	0	2	14	17	–3	5th–8th place
4.	Greece	2	3	1	0	2	16	17	–1	5th–8th place

Italy	6 – 7	Greece
Croatia	5 – 6	United States

Italy	11 – 8	United States
Croatia	5 – 4	Greece

Italy	7 – 4	Croatia
United States	6 – 5	Greece

=== GROUP B ===
	Team	Points	G	W	D	L	GF	GA	Diff	Qualification
1.	Hungary	5	3	2	1	0	29	18	+11	Semi-finals
2.	Russia	4	3	2	0	1	22	22	0	Semi-finals
3.	Spain	3	3	1	1	1	22	21	+1	5th–8th place
4.	Netherlands	0	3	0	0	3	22	34	–12	5th–8th place

Spain	11 – 9	Netherlands
Russia	6 – 10	Hungary

Spain	7 – 7	Hungary
Russia	11 – 8	Netherlands

Spain	4 – 5	Russia
Hungary	12 – 5	Netherlands

== 5th–8th place semifinals ==
- Saturday 16 September 1995

Croatia	9 – 7	Netherlands
Spain	5 – 3	Greece

== Semi-finals ==
- Saturday 16 September 1995

Italy	6 – 5	Russia
Hungary	11 – 6	United States

== Seventh place ==
- Sunday 17 september 1995

Netherlands	13 – 8	Greece

== Fifth place ==
- Sunday 17 september 1995

Croatia	2 – 7	Spain

== Third place ==
- Sunday 17 september 1995

Russia	10 – 8	United States

== FINAL ==
- Sunday 17 september 1995

Italy	10 – 11	Hungary

== Final ranking ==
RANK	TEAM
1st place, gold medalist(s)	Hungary
2nd place, silver medalist(s)	Italy
3rd place, bronze medalist(s)	Russia
4.	United States
5.	Spain
6.	Croatia
7.	Netherlands
8.	Greece

1995 Men's FINA World Cup winners

Hungary
Second title
