= Water polo at the 1979 Summer Universiade =

Water polo at the X Summer Universiade

Medalists
1st place, gold medalist(s)		United States
2nd place, silver medalist(s)		Soviet Union
3rd place, bronze medalist(s)		Yugoslavia

Water polo events were contested at the 1979 Summer Universiade in Mexico City, Mexico.

Event	Gold	Silver	Bronze
Men's	United States (USA)	Soviet Union (URS)	Yugoslavia (YUG)
