= Water polo at the 1997 Summer Universiade =

Water polo at the XIX Summer Universiade

Medalists
1st place, gold medalist(s)		Italy
2nd place, silver medalist(s)		Hungary
3rd place, bronze medalist(s)		Australia

Water polo events were contested at the 1997 Summer Universiade in the island of Sicily, Italy.

Event	Gold	Silver	Bronze
Men's	Italy (ITA)	Hungary (HUN)	Australia (AUS)
