= Russia men's national water polo team =

Men's national water polo team representing Russia

Russia
- FINA code: RUS
- Association: Russian Water Polo Federation
- Confederation: LEN (Europe)
- Head coach: Sergey Yevstigneyev
- Asst coach: Marat Zakirov
- Captain: Sergey Lisunov

FINA ranking (since 2008)
- Current: 14 (as of 9 August 2021)

Olympic Games (team statistics)
- Appearances: 3 (first in 1996)
- Best result: (silver) (2000)

World Championship
- Appearances: 8 (first in 1994)
- Best result: (bronze) (1994, 2001)

World Cup
- Appearances: 6 (first in 1993)
- Best result: (gold) (2002)

World League
- Appearances: 16 (first in 2002)
- Best result: (gold) (2002)

European Championship
- Appearances: 13 (first in 1993)
- Best result: (bronze) (1997)

Media
- Website: waterpolo.ru

Russia men's national water polo team
Medal record

Representing Russia

Summer Universiade
| Silver medal – second place | 2001 Beijing | Team |
| Silver medal – second place | 2011 Shenzhen | Team |
| Silver medal – second place | 2013 Kazan | Team |
| Silver medal – second place | 2017 Taipei | Team |

Logo of the Water Polo Association of Russia

The Russia men's national water polo team is the representative for Russia in international men's water polo. The team is a successor of the Soviet water polo team.

== History ==
=== In the Russian Empire ===
Water polo in Russia dates back to 1910, when the sport was included into the national water sports programme. The Shuvalov school was opened back then, featuring rules that differed from the international rules. In 1913, the first water polo tournament was played between the Shuvalov school and Moscow, with the first winning 3–2. The new sport progressed in Russia, as all swimming organizations included this sport into their programme. P. Erofeev and A. Shemansky further populized water polo by publishing brochures with rules and hints.

=== In the Soviet Union ===
As previously, water polo was predominant in Moscow and Leningrad (formerly known as St. Petersburg). However, this changed when the water polo teams of the Black Sea Fleet, Baltic Fleet and Caspian Flotilla further spread water polo in Russia. In the early history, water polo was popular especially among sailors. The strongest teams were Delfin of Leningrad and the Moscow Life Saving Society and the Yacht-Club. Following the resolution by the organizing bureau of the Central Committee of the Communist Party of the Soviet Union in 1925, physical culture has been greatly propagated in Russia, stimulating water polo as well.

The first championship took place in 1925. Apart from the teams of Leningrad, Moscow and Kiev, the tournament featured teams from the Caucasus, Crimea, Ural, as well as the aforementioned fleet teams. Three years later, water polo was included in the All-Union Spartakiade (sports festival). The team of Leningrad dominated in Russian water polo until 1933, as the city had winter water pools and so had more training opportunities. In 1946, the USSR Water Polo Cup was introduced. One year later, the Soviet Union was selected into the FINA. The national water polo then debuted at the 1952 Winter Olympics in Helsinki.

== Results ==
=== Olympic Games ===
- 1996 – 5th place
- 2000 – (silver) Silver medal
- 2004 – (bronze) Bronze medal

=== World Championship ===
- 1994 – (bronze) Bronze medal
- 1998 – 6th place
- 2001 – (bronze) Bronze medal
- 2003 – 10th place
- 2005 – 7th place
- 2007 – 7th place
- 2015 – 14th place
- 2017 – 8th place
- 2022 – Disqualified

=== World Cup ===
- 1993 – 5th place
- 1995 – (bronze) Bronze medal
- 1997 – 4th place
- 1999 – 4th place
- 2002 – (gold) Gold medal
- 2006 – 8th place
- 2023 – 7th place

=== World League ===
- 2002 – (gold) Gold medal
- 2005 – 6th place
- 2006 – 14th place
- 2007 – 13th place
- 2008 – 13th place
- 2009 – 15th place
- 2010 – 13th place
- 2011 – 14th place
- 2012 – Preliminary round
- 2013 – 5th place
- 2014 – Preliminary round
- 2015 – Preliminary round
- 2016 – Preliminary round
- 2017 – 5th place
- 2018 – Preliminary round
- 2019 – Preliminary round
- 2020 – Preliminary round

=== European Championship ===
- 1993 – 6th place
- 1995 – 6th place
- 1997 – (bronze) Bronze medal
- 1999 – 5th place
- 2001 – 5th place
- 2003 – 4th place
- 2006 – 9th place
- 2008 – 10th place
- 2010 – 11th place
- 2014 – 11th place
- 2016 – 8th place
- 2018 – 7th place
- 2020 – 8th place
- 2022 – Disqualified

== Current squad ==
Roster for the 2020 Men's European Water Polo Championship.

Head coach: Sergey Yevstigneyev

| No | Name | Pos. | L/R | Date of birth | Height | Weight | Caps | Club |
|---|---|---|---|---|---|---|---|---|
| 1 | Pyotr Fedotov | GK | R | 2 July 1992 (age 34) | 1.88 m (6 ft 2 in) | 84 kg (185 lb) | 40 | (Russia) Spartak Volgograd |
| 2 | Ivan Suchkov | DF | R | 15 June 1995 (age 31) | 1.96 m (6 ft 5 in) | 97 kg (214 lb) | 56 | (Russia) Dynamo Moscow |
| 3 | Ivan Vasilev | W | R | 25 March 2000 (age 26) | 1.97 m (6 ft 6 in) | 80 kg (180 lb) | 23 | (Russia) Baltika Saint-Petersburg |
| 4 | Nikita Dereviankin | CF | L | 21 June 1994 (age 32) | 1.95 m (6 ft 5 in) | 109 kg (240 lb) | 60 | (Russia) Sintez Kazan |
| 5 | Artyom Ashayev | FP | R | 5 December 1988 (age 37) | 1.91 m (6 ft 3 in) | 96 kg (212 lb) | 45 | (Russia) Spartak Volgograd |
| 6 | Konstantin Kharkov | W | L | 23 February 1997 (age 29) | 1.97 m (6 ft 6 in) | 93 kg (205 lb) | 36 | (Croatia) HAVK Mladost |
| 7 | Daniil Merkulov | FP | R | 3 March 1997 (age 29) | 1.91 m (6 ft 3 in) | 105 kg (231 lb) | 73 | (Croatia) VK Jug |
| 8 | Ivan Nagayev | W | L | 30 November 1993 (age 32) | 1.90 m (6 ft 3 in) | 93 kg (205 lb) | 74 | (Germany) Waspo Hannover |
| 9 | Igor Bychkov | CF | R | 21 January 1994 (age 32) | 2.02 m (6 ft 8 in) | 110 kg (240 lb) | 45 | (Russia) Dynamo Moscow |
| 10 | Konstantin Kiselyov | DF | R | 16 May 1995 (age 31) | 1.93 m (6 ft 4 in) | 104 kg (229 lb) | 10 | (Russia) Spartak Volgograd |
| 11 | Sergey Lisunov (C) | CF | R | 12 October 1986 (age 40) | 1.97 m (6 ft 6 in) | 110 kg (240 lb) | 253 | (Russia) Dynamo Moscow |
| 12 | Roman Shepelev | FP | R | 3 August 1993 (age 33) | 1.90 m (6 ft 3 in) | 86 kg (190 lb) | 71 | (Russia) Dynamo Moscow |
| 13 | Vitaly Statsenko | GK | R | 21 July 1997 (age 29) | 1.84 m (6 ft 0 in) | 95 kg (209 lb) | 38 | (Russia) TSOP Moscow |

== See also ==
- Russia men's Olympic water polo team records and statistics
- Soviet Union men's national water polo team
- Russia women's national water polo team
