= Water polo at the 1995 Summer Universiade =

Water polo at the XVIII Summer Universiade

Medalists
1st place, gold medalist(s)		Yugoslavia
2nd place, silver medalist(s)		Hungary
3rd place, bronze medalist(s)		Australia

Water polo events were contested at the 1995 Summer Universiade in Fukuoka, Japan.

Event	Gold	Silver	Bronze
Men's	Yugoslavia (YUG)	Hungary (HUN)	Australia (AUS)
