= Hungary men's national water polo team =

Hungary
- FINA code: HUN
- Association: Hungarian Water Polo Federation
- Confederation: LEN (Europe)
- Head coach: Zsolt Varga
- Asst coach: András Gárdonyi; Gergely Lukács
- Captain: Krisztián Manhercz
- Most caps: Tibor Benedek (384)

FINA ranking (since 2008)
- Current: 2 (as of 31 July 2023)
- Highest: 1 (2008, 2013)
- Lowest: 7 (2011)

Olympic Games (team statistics)
- Appearances: 24 (first in 1912)
- Best result: (gold) (1932, 1936, 1952, 1956, 1964, 1976, 2000, 2004, 2008)
- 5-time Olympian(s): Dezső Gyarmati (1948–1964); Tibor Benedek (1992–2008); Tamás Kásás (1996–2012)
- Most medals: Dezső Gyarmati (5 medals, 3 gold, 1 silver, and 1 bronze)
- Top scorer(s): Tibor Benedek (65 goals, 1992–2008)
- Flag bearer(s): István Szívós Sr. (1980); Péter Biros (2012)

World Championship
- Appearances: 22 (first in 1973)
- Best result: (gold) (1973, 2003, 2013, 2023)
- Most titles: Norbert Madaras (2003, 2013)

World Cup
- Appearances: 16 (first in 1979)
- Best result: (gold) (1979, 1995, 1999, 2018)
- Most medals: Rajmund Fodor (6 medals, 2 gold, 3 silver, and 1 bronze)

World League
- Appearances: 10 (first in 2002)
- Best result: (gold) (2003, 2004)

European Championship
- Appearances: 36 (first in 1926)
- Best result: (gold) (1926, 1927, 1931, 1934, 1938, 1954, 1958, 1962, 1974, 1977, 1997, 1999, 2020)

Europa Cup
- Appearances: 2 (first in 2018)
- Best result: (gold) (2019)

Media
- Website: waterpolo.hu (in Hungarian)
Medal record
Olympic Games
Gold medal – first place	1932 Los Angeles	Team
Gold medal – first place	1936 Berlin	Team
Gold medal – first place	1952 Helsinki	Team
Gold medal – first place	1956 Melbourne	Team
Gold medal – first place	1964 Tokyo	Team
Gold medal – first place	1976 Montréal	Team
Gold medal – first place	2000 Sydney	Team
Gold medal – first place	2004 Athens	Team
Gold medal – first place	2008 Beijing	Team
Silver medal – second place	1928 Amsterdam	Team
Silver medal – second place	1948 London	Team
Silver medal – second place	1972 Munich	Team
Bronze medal – third place	1960 Rome	Team
Bronze medal – third place	1968 Mexico City	Team
Bronze medal – third place	1980 Moscow	Team
Bronze medal – third place	2020 Tokyo	Team
World Championships
Gold medal – first place	1973 Belgrade	Team
Gold medal – first place	2003 Barcelona	Team
Gold medal – first place	2013 Barcelona	Team
Gold medal – first place	2023 Fukuoka	Team
Silver medal – second place	1975 Cali	Team
Silver medal – second place	1978 Berlin	Team
Silver medal – second place	1982 Guayaquil	Team
Silver medal – second place	1998 Perth	Team
Silver medal – second place	2005 Montréal	Team
Silver medal – second place	2007 Melbourne	Team
Silver medal – second place	2017 Budapest	Team
Silver medal – second place	2025 Singapore	Team
Bronze medal – third place	1991 Perth	Team
World Cup
Gold medal – first place	1979 Belgrade
Gold medal – first place	1995 Atlanta
Gold medal – first place	1999 Sydney
Gold medal – first place	2018 Berlin
Silver medal – second place	1993 Athens
Silver medal – second place	2002 Belgrade
Silver medal – second place	2006 Budapest
Silver medal – second place	2014 Almaty
Silver medal – second place	2026 Sydney
Bronze medal – third place	1989 Berlin
Bronze medal – third place	1997 Athens
Bronze medal – third place	2025 Podgorica
World League
Gold medal – first place	2003 New York
Gold medal – first place	2004 Long Beach
Silver medal – second place	2005 Belgrade
Silver medal – second place	2007 Berlin
Silver medal – second place	2013 Chelyabinsk
Silver medal – second place	2014 Dubai
Silver medal – second place	2018 Budapest
Bronze medal – third place	2002 Patras
European Championship
Gold medal – first place	1926 Budapest
Gold medal – first place	1927 Bologna
Gold medal – first place	1931 Paris
Gold medal – first place	1934 Magdeburg
Gold medal – first place	1938 London
Gold medal – first place	1954 Turin
Gold medal – first place	1958 Budapest
Gold medal – first place	1962 Leipzig
Gold medal – first place	1974 Vienna
Gold medal – first place	1977 Jönköping
Gold medal – first place	1997 Seville
Gold medal – first place	1999 Florence
Gold medal – first place	2020 Budapest
Silver medal – second place	1970 Barcelona
Silver medal – second place	1983 Rome
Silver medal – second place	1993 Sheffield
Silver medal – second place	1995 Vienna
Silver medal – second place	2006 Belgrade
Silver medal – second place	2014 Budapest
Silver medal – second place	2022 Split
Silver medal – second place	2026 Belgrade
Bronze medal – third place	1981 Split
Bronze medal – third place	2001 Budapest
Bronze medal – third place	2003 Kranj
Bronze medal – third place	2008 Málaga
Bronze medal – third place	2012 Eindhoven
Bronze medal – third place	2016 Belgrade
Europa Cup
Gold medal – first place	2019 Zagreb
- Last updated: 25 January 2026

The Hungary men's national water polo team represents Hungary in international men's water polo competitions and is controlled by the Hungarian Water Polo Association. It is considered the world's top power in the history of water polo, having won 16 Olympic, 12 World Championship, 10 FINA World Cup, eight FINA World League, 26 European Championship and 17 Summer Universiade medals for a total of 91.

== Competitive record ==
=== Medals ===
Updated after 2023 World Championships

Competition	1st place, gold medalist(s)	2nd place, silver medalist(s)	3rd place, bronze medalist(s)	Total
Olympic Games	9	3	4	16
Friendship Games	0	1	0	1
World Championship	4	7	1	12
World Cup	4	5	2	11
World League	2	5	1	8
European Championship	13	7	6	26
Europa Cup	1	0	0	1
Mediterranean Games	0	0	0	0
Summer Universiade	5	6	6	17
Total	38	34	20	92

Champions Runners-up Third place Fourth place

=== Olympic Games ===
Hungary missed five Olympics, but they have won the title nine times, which is a record. As of today, there are only seven tournaments in which Hungary participated but did not receive a medal.

Games	Round	Position	Pld	W	D	L	GF	GA	GD
(France) 1900 Paris	did not participate								
(United States) 1904 St. Louis	did not participate								
(United Kingdom) 1908 London	did not participate								
(Sweden) 1912 Stockholm	First round	5th of 6	2	0	0	2	9	11	−2
(Belgium) 1920 Antwerp	did not participate								
(France) 1924 Paris	Quarter-finals	5th of 13	4	2	0	2	17	17	0
(Netherlands) 1928 Amsterdam	Runners-up	2nd of 14	4	3	0	1	26	8	+18
(United States) 1932 Los Angeles	Champions	1st of 5	3	3	0	0	31	2	+29
(Germany) 1936 Berlin	Champions	1st of 16	7	6	1	0	44	4	+40
(United Kingdom) 1948 London	Runners-up	2nd of 18	7	5	1	1	34	17	+17
(Finland) 1952 Helsinki	Champions	1st of 21	8	6	2	0	53	16	+37
(Australia) 1956 Melbourne	Champions	1st of 10	6	6	0	0	26	4	+22
(Italy) 1960 Rome	Third place	3rd of 16	7	4	2	1	37	18	+19
(Japan) 1964 Tokyo	Champions	1st of 13	6	5	1	0	34	13	+21
1968 Mexico City	Third place	3rd of 15	8	7	0	1	54	26	+28
(West Germany) 1972 Munich	Runners-up	2nd of 16	8	6	2	0	42	21	+21
(Canada) 1976 Montreal	Champions	1st of 12	8	7	1	0	45	32	+13
(Soviet Union) 1980 Moscow	Third place	3rd of 12	8	5	1	2	51	44	+7
(United States) 1984 Los Angeles	did not participate								
(South Korea) 1988 Seoul	5th–8th placement	5th of 12	7	3	2	2	72	57	+15
(Spain) 1992 Barcelona	5th–8th placement	6th of 12	7	3	2	2	65	62	+3
(United States) 1996 Atlanta	Fourth place	4th of 12	8	6	0	2	83	73	+10
(Australia) 2000 Sydney	Champions	1st of 12	8	6	0	2	78	57	+21
(Greece) 2004 Athens	Champions	1st of 12	7	7	0	0	59	39	+20
(China) 2008 Beijing	Champions	1st of 12	7	6	1	0	85	55	+30
(United Kingdom) 2012 London	Match for 5th place	5th of 12	8	5	0	3	98	80	+18
(Brazil) 2016 Rio de Janeiro	Match for 5th place	5th of 12	8	4	4	0	91	66	+25
(Japan) 2020 Tokyo	Third place	3rd of 12	8	5	1	2	94	60	+34
(France) 2024 Paris	Fourth place	4th of 12	8	3	2	3	87	80	+7
Total	24/29	9 Titles	162	113	23	26	1,315	862	+453

=== World Championships ===
Hungary has taken part in every World Championships. They have won this championship four times: in 1973, 2003, 2013 and 2023.

Year	Position	Pld	W	D	L	GF	GA	GD
(Socialist Federal Republic of Yugoslavia) 1973	Gold medal	8	7	1	0	58	24	+34
(Colombia) 1975	Silver medal	8	7	0	1	62	42	+20
(West Germany) 1978	Silver medal	8	5	3	0	49	33	+16
(Ecuador) 1982	Silver medal	7	5	2	0	70	49	+21
(Spain) 1986	9th	6	4	0	2	58	43	+15
(Australia) 1991	Bronze medal	7	5	1	1	83	62	+21
(Italy) 1994	5th	7	4	1	2	79	54	+25
(Australia) 1998	Silver medal	8	6	0	2	85	48	+37
(Japan) 2001	5th	8	6	0	2	67	51	+16
(Spain) 2003	Gold medal	6	5	1	0	62	37	+25
(Canada) 2005	Silver medal	6	5	0	1	57	29	+28
(Australia) 2007	Silver medal	6	5	0	1	84	43	+41
(Italy) 2009	5th	6	4	1	1	68	42	+26
(China) 2011	4th	6	4	0	2	73	60	+13
(Spain) 2013	Gold medal	7	5	1	1	76	54	+22
(Russia) 2015	6th	6	4	0	2	81	40	+41
(Hungary) 2017	Silver medal	6	4	1	1	62	37	+25
(South Korea) 2019	4th	6	4	0	2	87	51	+36
(Hungary) 2022	7th	6	4	1	1	79	56	+23
(Japan) 2023	Gold medal	6	5	1	0	84	64	+20
(Qatar) 2024	7th	6	2	2	2	86	54	+32
(Singapore) 2025	Silver medal	7	5	0	2	115	90	+25
Total	22/22	147	105	16	26	1625	1063	+562

=== World Cup ===
The Hungarian national team missed three editions of the World Cup, but they won it four times: in 1979, 1995, 1999 and 2018.

Year	Position	Pld	W	D	L	GF	GA	GD
(Socialist Federal Republic of Yugoslavia) 1979	Gold medal	7	5	1	1	37	28	+9
(United States) 1981	6th	7	3	0	4	64	56	+8
(United States) 1983	7th	7	0	4	3	57	64	−7
(West Germany) 1985	did not participate							
(Greece) 1987	did not participate							
(West Germany) 1989	Bronze medal	5	3	0	2	40	36	+4
(Spain) 1991	4th	5	2	1	2	48	42	+6
(Greece) 1993	Silver medal	5	4	0	1	39	30	+9
(United States) 1995	Gold medal	5	4	1	0	51	34	+17
(Greece) 1997	Bronze medal	5	3	1	1	38	29	+9
(Australia) 1999	Gold medal	5	4	0	1	44	24	+20
(Serbia and Montenegro) 2002	Silver medal	6	3	0	3	48	43	+5
(Hungary) 2006	Silver medal	5	4	0	1	57	35	+22
(Romania) 2010	did not participate							
(Kazakhstan) 2014	Silver medal	6	4	2	0	61	35	+26
(Germany) 2018	Gold medal	6	5	0	1	70	57	+13
(United States) 2023	4th	3	1	0	2	27	28	−1
(Montenegro) 2025	Bronze medal	5	4	0	1	77	56	+21
(Australia) 2026	Silver medal	3	2	0	1	43	38	+5
Total	16/19	85	51	10	24	801	635	+166

=== World League ===
Hungary has taken part in the first edition of the FINA Water Polo World League in 2002. They have won the gold medal one and two years later. In 2006 and from 2008 to 2012, Hungary did not participate in the World League.

Year	Position	Pld	W	D	L	GF	GA	GD
(Greece) 2002	Bronze medal	16	13	0	3	188	119	+69
(United States) 2003	Gold medal	5	5	0	0	56	35	+21
(United States) 2004	Gold medal	14	11	0	3	150	114	+36
(Serbia and Montenegro) 2005	Silver medal	14	11	0	3	178	113	+65
(Greece) 2006	did not participate							
(Germany) 2007	Silver medal	14	13	0	1	187	100	+87
(Italy) 2008	did not participate							
(Montenegro) 2009	did not participate							
(Serbia) 2010	did not participate							
(Italy) 2011	did not participate							
(Kazakhstan) 2012	did not participate							
(Russia) 2013	Silver medal	6	4	0	2	66	59	+7
(United Arab Emirates) 2014	Silver medal	10	8	0	2	103	73	+30
(Italy) 2015	6th	12	9	0	3	156	105	+51
(China) 2016	did not qualify							
(Russia) 2017	did not participate							
(Hungary) 2018	Silver medal	10	6	2	2	106	73	+33
(Serbia) 2019	5th	6	3	2	1	78	67	+11
(Georgia (country)) 2020	did not qualify							
(France) 2022	did not qualify							
Total	10/20	107	83	4	20	1,268	858	+410

=== European Championships ===
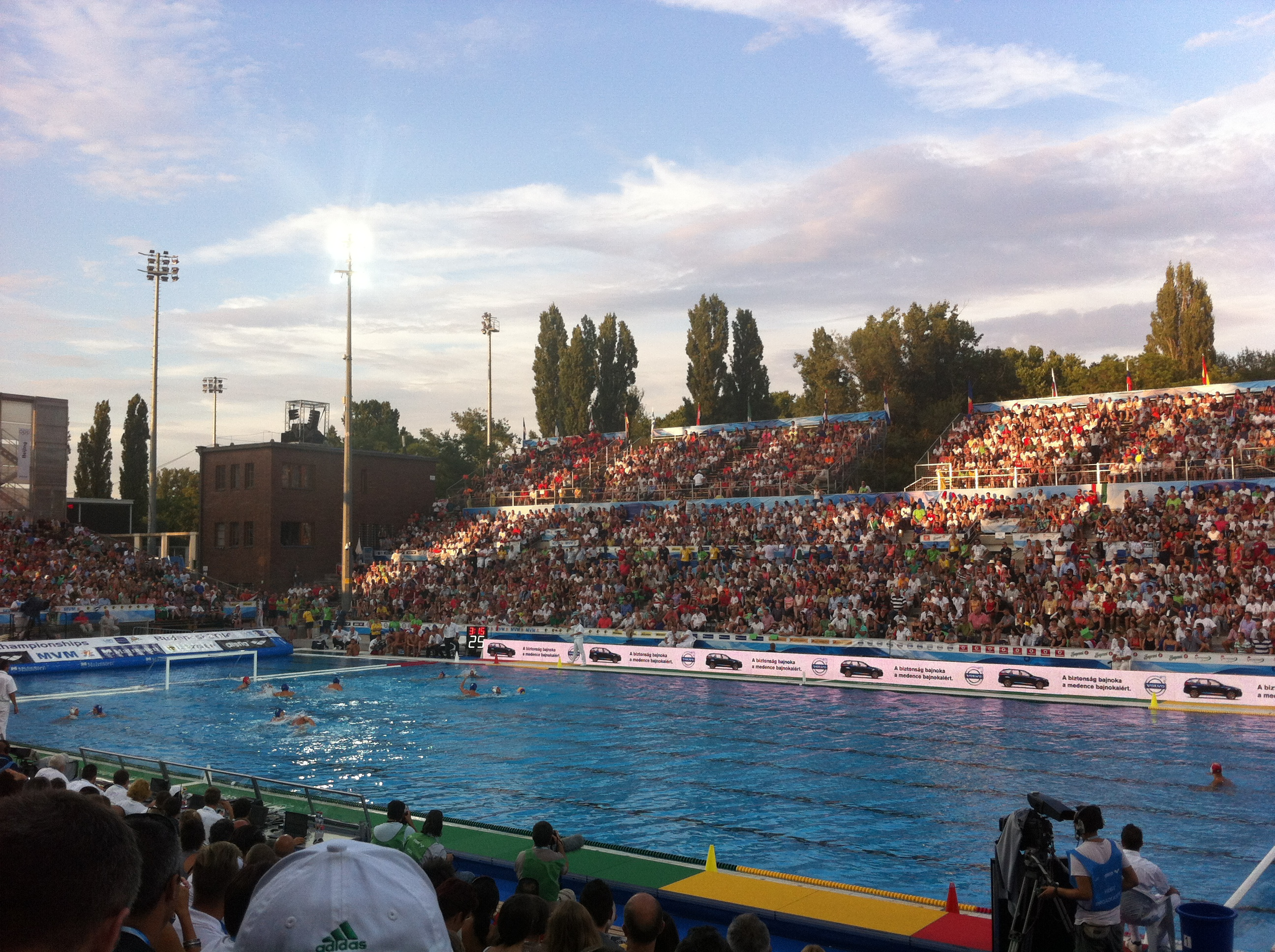
semi-final against Italy in 2014 Men's European Water Polo Championship

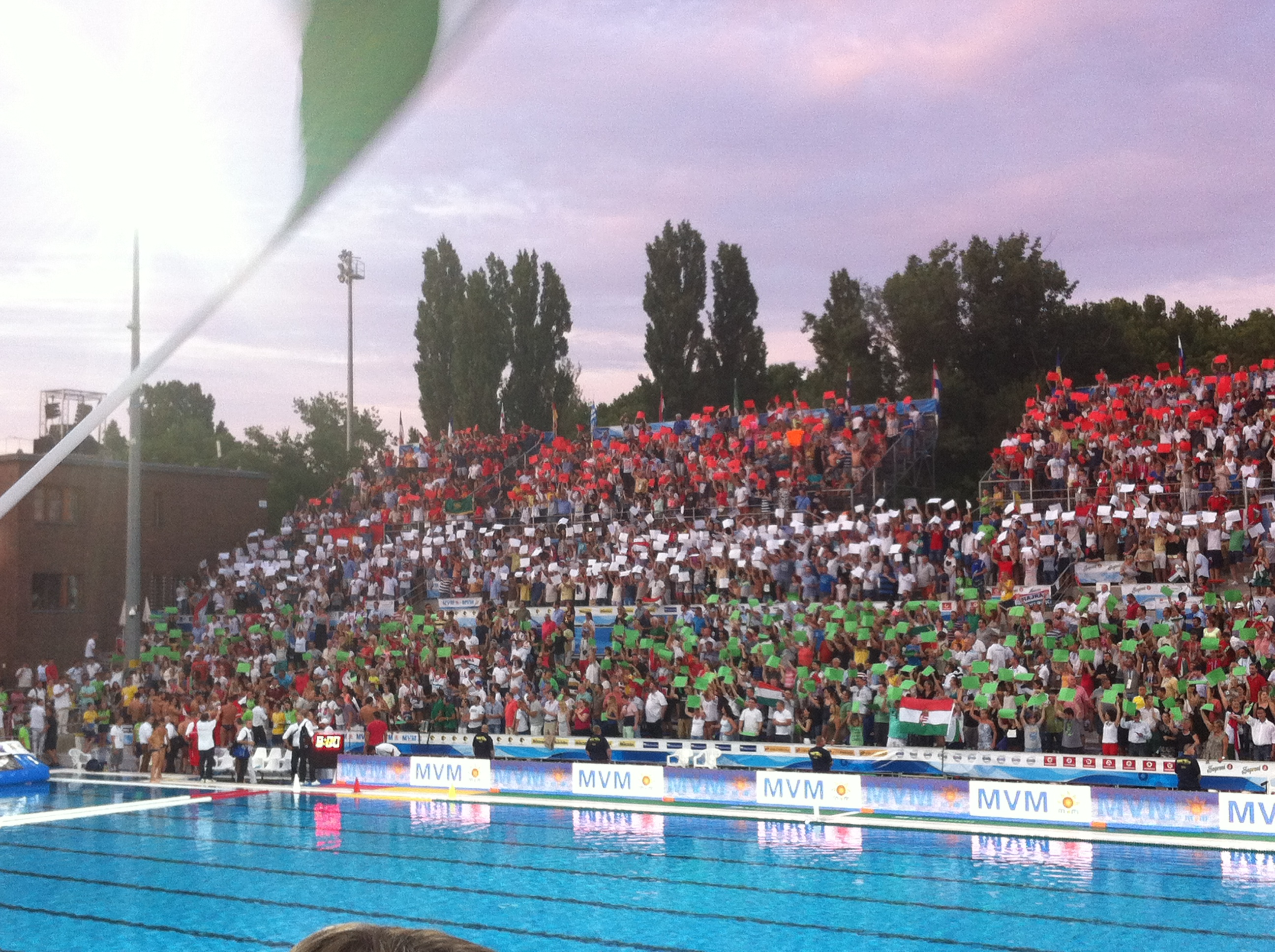
supporters celebrate the Hungarian team

Hungary missed only one European Championship, in 1950, and they have won the tournament 13 times, which is (as in the World Championships) a record. No team has a better result than Hungary in history of the European Championship.

Year	Position	Pld	W	D	L	GF	GA	GD
(Hungary) 1926	Gold medal	3	3	0	0	16	3	+13
(Italy) 1927	Gold medal	3	3	0	0	14	6	+8
(France) 1931	Gold medal	6	5	1	0	52	7	+45
(Germany) 1934	Gold medal	6	6	0	0	35	5	+30
(United Kingdom) 1938	Gold medal	6	6	0	0	35	3	+32
(Monaco) 1947	4th	4	2	1	1	16	12	+4
(Austria) 1950	did not participate							
(Italy) 1954	Gold medal							
(Hungary) 1958	Gold medal							
(East Germany) 1962	Gold medal							
(Netherlands) 1966	5th							
(Spain) 1970	Silver medal							
(Austria) 1974	Gold medal							
(Sweden) 1977	Gold medal							
(Socialist Federal Republic of Yugoslavia) 1981	Bronze medal							
(Italy) 1983	Silver medal							
(Bulgaria) 1985	5th							
(France) 1987	5th							
(West Germany) 1989	9th							
(Greece) 1991	5th							
(United Kingdom) 1993	Silver medal							
(Austria) 1995	Silver medal	7	6	0	1	95	53	+42
(Spain) 1997	Gold medal							
(Italy) 1999	Gold medal							
(Hungary) 2001	Bronze medal							
(Slovenia) 2003	Bronze medal							
(Serbia) 2006	Silver medal							
(Spain) 2008	Bronze medal							
(Croatia) 2010	4th							
(Netherlands) 2012	Bronze medal							
(Hungary) 2014	Silver medal							
(Serbia) 2016	Bronze medal	7	5	1	1	80	45	+35
(Spain) 2018	8th	7	2	1	4	52	54	−2
(Hungary) 2020	Gold medal	6	4	2	0	89	43	+46
(Croatia) 2022	Silver medal	6	5	0	1	92	44	+48
(Croatia) 2024	4th	6	2	1	3	58	59	−1
(Serbia) 2026	Silver medal	8	5	1	2	112	82	+30
Total	36/37							

=== Friendship Games ===
Year	Position	Pld	W	D	L	GF	GA	GD
(Cuba) 1984	Silver medal	5	3	1	1	68	43	+25
Total	2/6	5	3	1	1	68	43	+25

=== Europa Cup ===
- 2018 – 6th place
- 2019 – (gold) Gold medal

== Team ==
=== Current squad ===
Roster for the 2026 Men's European Water Polo Championship.

Head coach: Zsolt Varga

Name	Date of birth	Pos.	Club
Csoma Kristóf	26 January 1992 (age 34)	GK	(Hungary) Budapesti Honvéd SE
Dániel Angyal	29 March 1992 (age 34)	DF	(Greece) Olympiacos Piraeus
Krisztián Manhercz (C)	6 February 1997 (age 29)	W	(Hungary) FTC-Telekom
Nagy Ákos	15 April 2004 (age 22)	W	(Hungary) FTC-Telekom
Vince Vigvári	23 June 2003 (age 23)	W	(Spain) CN Barcelona
Ádám Nagy	19 May 1998 (age 28)	DF	(France) CN Marseille
Gergő Fekete	24 June 2000 (age 26)	W	(Hungary) FTC-Telekom
Tátrai Dávid	15 August 2003 (age 22)	W	(Hungary) BVSC Manna ABC
Péter Kovács	16 May 1991 (age 35)	CF	(Hungary) BVSC Manna ABC
Vigvári Vendel	10 September 2001 (age 24)	W	(Hungary) FTC-Telekom
Szilárd Jansik	6 April 1994 (age 32)	W	(Hungary) FTC-Telekom
Benedek Batizi	21 August 2001 (age 24)	CF	(Hungary) BVSC Manna ABC
Soma Vogel	7 July 1997 (age 29)	GK	(Hungary) FTC-Telekom
Vismeg Zsombor	14 March 2003 (age 23)	DF	(Hungary) FTC-Telekom
Vince Varga	16 August 2005 (age 20)	W	(Hungary) FTC-Telekom

=== Former squads ===
==== Olympic Games ====
Roster for the 2025 World Championships.

Head coach: Zsolt Varga

- 1 Kristóf Csoma GK
- 2 Dániel Angyal FP
- 3 Krisztián Manhercz FP
- 4 Erik Molnár FP
- 5 Márton Vámos FP
- 6 Ádám Nagy FP
- 7 Gergő Fekete FP
- 8 Gergely Burián FP
- 9 Péter Kovács FP
- 10 Vendel Vigvári FP
- 11 Szilárd Jansik FP
- 12 Vince Vigvári FP
- 13 Márton Mizsei GK
- 14 Ákos Nagy FP
- 15 Zsombor Vismeg FP

=== Individual all-time records ===
Still active players are highlighted.

==== Most appearances and goals ====
Total number of matches played in official competitions only.

#	Player	Years	Matches	Goals
1	Tibor Benedek	1990–2008	384	
2	ifj. István Szívós	1966–1980	308	
3	Dániel Varga	2005–2016	278	
4	Norbert Hosnyánszky	2005–2021	258	
4	Tamás Faragó	1970–1985	258	
6	Dénes Varga	2004–2024	246	
7	György Gerendás	1975–1986	230	
8	Zoltán Kósz	1986–2001, 2006	228	
9	Endre Molnár	1966–1980	189	
10	László Sárosi	1966–1978	634	

Statistics accurate as of matches played 18 January 2016

=== Olympic statistics ===
==== Five-time Olympians ====
- Dezső Gyarmati: 1948, 1952, 1956, 1960, 1964;
- Tibor Benedek: 1992, 1996, 2000, 2004, 2008;
- Tamás Kásás: 1996, 2000, 2004, 2008, 2012.

==== Olympians with four or more medals ====
- Dezső Gyarmati: 5 medals, 3 gold, 1 silver and 1 bronze (1948 (silver) , 1952 (gold) , 1956 (gold) , 1960 (bronze) , 1964 (gold) );
- György Kárpáti: 4 medals, 3 gold and 1 bronze (1952 (gold) , 1956 (gold) , 1960 (bronze) , 1964 (gold) ).
- András Bodnár: 4 medals, 1 gold, 1 silver and 2 bronze (1960 (bronze) , 1964 (gold) , 1968 (bronze) , 1972 (silver) ).
- ifj. István Szívós: 4 medals, 1 gold, 1 silver and 2 bronze (1968 (bronze) , 1972 (silver) , 1976 (gold) , 1980 (bronze) ).

==== Olympians with three gold medals ====
- Dezső Gyarmati: 1952 (gold) , 1956 (gold) , 1964 (gold) ;
- György Kárpáti: 1952 (gold) , 1956 (gold) , 1964 (gold) ;
- Tibor Benedek: 2000 (gold) , 2004 (gold) , 2008 (gold) ;
- Péter Biros: 2000 (gold) , 2004 (gold) , 2008 (gold) ;
- Tamás Kásás: 2000 (gold) , 2004 (gold) , 2008 (gold) ;
- Gergely Kiss: 2000 (gold) , 2004 (gold) , 2008 (gold) ;
- Tamás Molnár: 2000 (gold) , 2004 (gold) , 2008 (gold) ;
- Zoltán Szécsi: 2000 (gold) , 2004 (gold) , 2008 (gold) .

=== World Championship statistics ===
==== Players with four or more medals ====
- Norbert Madaras: 4 medals, 2 gold and 2 silver (2003 (gold) , 2005 (silver) , 2007 (silver) , 2013 (gold) );
- Rajmund Fodor: 4 medals, 1 gold and 3 silver (1998 (silver) , 2003 (gold) , 2005 (silver) , 2007 (silver) );
- Tamás Kásás: 4 medals, 1 gold and 3 silver (1998 (silver) , 2003 (gold) , 2005 (silver) , 2007 (silver) );
- Gergely Kiss: 4 medals, 1 gold and 3 silver (1998 (silver) , 2003 (gold) , 2005 (silver) , 2007 (silver) );
- Tamás Molnár: 4 medals, 1 gold and 3 silver (1998 (silver) , 2003 (gold) , 2005 (silver) , 2007 (silver) );
- Tibor Benedek: 4 medals, 1 gold, 2 silver and 1 bronze (1991 (bronze) , 1998 (silver) , 2003 (gold) , 2007 (silver) ).

==== Players with two gold medals ====
- Norbert Madaras: 2003 (gold) , 2013 (gold) .
- Dénes Varga: 2013 (gold) , 2023 (gold)
- Márton Vámos: 2013 (gold) , 2023 (gold)

=== World Cup statistics ===
==== Players with four or more medals ====
- Rajmund Fodor: 6 medals, 2 gold, 3 silver and 1 bronze (1993 (silver) , 1995 (gold) , 1997 (bronze) , 1999 (gold) , 2002 (silver) , 2006 (silver) );
- Tamás Kásás: 5 medals, 2 gold, 2 silver and 1 bronze (1995 (gold) , 1997 (bronze) , 1999 (gold) , 2002 (silver) , 2006 (silver) );
- Tibor Benedek: 4 medals, 1 gold, 2 silver and 1 bronze (1993 (silver) , 1995 (gold) , 1997 (bronze) , 2002 (silver) );
- Gergely Kiss: 4 medals, 1 gold, 2 silver and 1 bronze (1997 (bronze) , 1999 (gold) , 2002 (silver) , 2006 (silver) );
- Tamás Molnár: 4 medals, 1 gold, 2 silver and 1 bronze (1997 (bronze) , 1999 (gold) , 2002 (silver) , 2006 (silver) ).

==== Players with two gold medals ====
- Rajmund Fodor: 1995 (gold) , 1999 (gold) ;
- Tamás Kásás: 1995 (gold) , 1999 (gold) ;
- Zoltán Kósz: 1995 (gold) , 1999 (gold) ;
- Frank Tóth: 1995 (gold) , 1999 (gold) ;
- Balázs Vincze: 1995 (gold) , 1999 (gold) .

== Awards ==
- Hungarian Sport Team of the Year: 1958, 1961, 1962, 1973, 1974, 1976, 1977, 1993, 1997, 1999, 2000, 2003, 2004, 2008, 2013

== See also ==
- Blood in the Water match
- Hungary men's Olympic water polo team records and statistics
- Hungary women's national water polo team
- List of Olympic champions in men's water polo
- List of men's Olympic water polo tournament records and statistics
- List of world champions in men's water polo
- List of members of the International Swimming Hall of Fame
