= Serbia at the 2025 World Aquatics Championships =

- Flag of Serbia
- World Aquatics code: SRB
- National federation: Serbian Swimming Federation
- Website: serbia-swim.org.rs (in Serbian)

in Singapore
- Competitors: 21 in 3 sports
- Medals: Gold 0 Silver 0 Bronze 0 Total 0

World Aquatics Championships appearances
- 2007; 2009; 2011; 2013; 2015; 2017; 2019; 2022; 2023; 2024; 2025

Other related appearances
- Yugoslavia (1973–1991); Serbia and Montenegro (1998–2005)

Serbia competed at the 2025 World Aquatics Championships in Singapore from July 11 to August 3, 2025.

== Competitors ==
The following is the list of competitors in the Championships.

Sport	Men	Women	Total
Diving	1	0	0
Swimming	5	0	5
Water polo	15	0	15
Total	21	0	21

== Diving ==
Men

Athlete	Event	Preliminaries		Semifinals		Final	
Athlete	Event	Points	Rank	Points	Rank	Points	Rank
Aleksa Teofilović	10 m platform	307.05	39	Did not advance			

== Swimming ==
Serbia entered 5 swimmers.

Men

Athlete	Event	Heat		Semi-final		Final	
Athlete	Event	Time	Rank	Time	Rank	Time	Rank
Nikola Aćin	50 m backstroke	25.24 NR	32	Did not advance			
Andrej Barna	50 m freestyle	21.44 NR	1 Q	21.45	3 Q	21.60	6
Luka Jovanović	100 m butterfly	54.84	52	Did not advance			
Velimir Stjepanović	100 m freestyle	48.83	27	Did not advance			
Velimir Stjepanović	200 m freestyle	1:48.04	28	Did not advance			
Nikola Aćin; Velimir Stjepanović; Luka Jovanović; Justin Cvetkov	4 × 100 m freestyle relay	3:14.11	15	—		Did not advance	

== Water polo ==
Summary

Team	Event	Group stage				Playoff	Quarterfinal	Semi-final	Final / BM	
Team	Event	Opposition Score	Opposition Score	Opposition Score	Rank	Opposition Score	Opposition Score	Opposition Score	Opposition Score	Rank
Serbia	Men's tournament	South Africa; W 27–3	Italy; L 16–17	Romania; W 19–9	2 P/Off	Japan; W 21–14	United States; W 14–9	Hungary; L 18–19	Greece; L 7–16	4

=== Men's tournament ===
Team roster

The following is the Serbian roster.

Head coach: Uroš Stevanović

- 1 Radoslav Filipović GK
- 2 Dušan Mandić FP
- 3 Strahinja Rašović FP
- 4 Sava Ranđelović FP
- 5 Miloš Ćuk FP
- 6 Nikola Murišić FP
- 7 Đorđe Lazić FP
- 8 Nikola Jakšić FP
- 9 Nemanja Vico FP
- 10 Boris Vapenski FP
- 11 Petar Jakšić FP
- 12 Viktor Rašović FP
- 13 Lazar Dobožanov GK
- 14 Vasilije Martinović FP
- 15 Vuk Milojević FP

Group play

Pos	Team	Pld	W	PSW	PSL	L	GF	GA	GD	Pts	Qualification
1	Italy	3	2	1	0	0	58	22	+36	8	Quarterfinals
2	Serbia	3	2	0	1	0	59	25	+34	7	Playoffs
3	Romania	3	1	0	0	2	38	41	−3	3	Playoffs
4	South Africa	3	0	0	0	3	12	79	−67	0	13–16th place semifinals

Source: Omegatiming
Rules for classification: 1) points; 2) head-to-head points; 3) head-to-head goal difference; 4) head-to-head number of goals scored; 5) Goal difference.

12 July 2025; 09:00	Report	Serbia	27–3	South Africa	OCBC Aquatic Centre, Singapore; Referees: Yasser Mehalhel (EGY), Stanko Ivanovski (MNE)
12 July 2025; 09:00	Report	Score by quarters: 8–0, 6–3, 4–0, 9–0			OCBC Aquatic Centre, Singapore; Referees: Yasser Mehalhel (EGY), Stanko Ivanovski (MNE)
12 July 2025; 09:00	Report	Mandić 6	Goals	three players 1	OCBC Aquatic Centre, Singapore; Referees: Yasser Mehalhel (EGY), Stanko Ivanovski (MNE)

14 July 2025; 20:45	Report	Italy	17–16	Serbia	OCBC Aquatic Centre, Singapore; Referees: Scott Voltz (USA), Boris Margeta (SLO)
14 July 2025; 20:45	Report	Score by quarters: 3–2, 3–3, 4–4, 3–4 PSO: 4–3			OCBC Aquatic Centre, Singapore; Referees: Scott Voltz (USA), Boris Margeta (SLO)
14 July 2025; 20:45	Report	Cannella 3	Goals	Mandić 5	OCBC Aquatic Centre, Singapore; Referees: Scott Voltz (USA), Boris Margeta (SLO)

16 July 2025; 16:00	Report	Serbia	19–9	Romania	OCBC Aquatic Centre, Singapore; Referees: Stanko Ivanovski (MKD), Jennifer McCall (USA)
16 July 2025; 16:00	Report	Score by quarters: 5–1, 4–1, 5–3, 5–4			OCBC Aquatic Centre, Singapore; Referees: Stanko Ivanovski (MKD), Jennifer McCall (USA)
16 July 2025; 16:00	Report	Ranđelović 4	Goals	three players 2	OCBC Aquatic Centre, Singapore; Referees: Stanko Ivanovski (MKD), Jennifer McCall (USA)

Playoffs

18 July 2025; 16:00	Report	Serbia	21–14	Japan	OCBC Aquatic Centre, Singapore; Referees: David Gómez (ESP), Frank Ohme (GER)
18 July 2025; 16:00	Report	Score by quarters: 5–2, 4–3, 9–3, 3–6			OCBC Aquatic Centre, Singapore; Referees: David Gómez (ESP), Frank Ohme (GER)
18 July 2025; 16:00	Report	Vapenski 4	Goals	three players 3	OCBC Aquatic Centre, Singapore; Referees: David Gómez (ESP), Frank Ohme (GER)

Quarterfinals

20 July 2025; 19:10	Report	United States	9–14	Serbia	OCBC Aquatic Centre, Singapore; Referees: Georgios Stavridis (GRE), Frank Ohme (GER)
20 July 2025; 19:10	Report	Score by quarters: 1–3, 2–3, 2–4, 4–4			OCBC Aquatic Centre, Singapore; Referees: Georgios Stavridis (GRE), Frank Ohme (GER)
20 July 2025; 19:10	Report	three players 2	Goals	four players 2	OCBC Aquatic Centre, Singapore; Referees: Georgios Stavridis (GRE), Frank Ohme (GER)

Semifinals

22 July 2025; 21:35	Report	Serbia	18–19	Hungary	OCBC Aquatic Centre, Singapore; Referees: Andrej Franulović (CRO), Boris Margeta (SLO)
22 July 2025; 21:35	Report	Score by quarters: 3–6, 5–2, 4–8, 6–3			OCBC Aquatic Centre, Singapore; Referees: Andrej Franulović (CRO), Boris Margeta (SLO)
22 July 2025; 21:35	Report	Mandić 6	Goals	Fekete, Manhercz 4	OCBC Aquatic Centre, Singapore; Referees: Andrej Franulović (CRO), Boris Margeta (SLO)

Third place game

24 July 2025; 17:35	Report	Greece	16–7	Serbia	OCBC Aquatic Centre, Singapore; Referees: David Gómez (ESP), Tamás Kovács-Csatlós (HUN)
24 July 2025; 17:35	Report	Score by quarters: 2–2, 6–0, 3–3, 5–2			OCBC Aquatic Centre, Singapore; Referees: David Gómez (ESP), Tamás Kovács-Csatlós (HUN)
24 July 2025; 17:35	Report	Kalogeropoulos, Papanikolaou 2	Goals	Martinović 4	OCBC Aquatic Centre, Singapore; Referees: David Gómez (ESP), Tamás Kovács-Csatlós (HUN)
