= Serbia at the 2024 World Aquatics Championships =

- Flag of Serbia
- FINA code: SRB
- National federation: Serbian Swimming Federation
- Website: serbia-swim.org.rs (in Serbian)

in Doha, Qatar
- Competitors: 30 in 4 sports
- Medals: Gold 0 Silver 0 Bronze 0 Total 0

World Aquatics Championships appearances
- 2007; 2009; 2011; 2013; 2015; 2017; 2019; 2022; 2023; 2024

Other related appearances
- Yugoslavia (1973–1991); Serbia and Montenegro (1998–2005)

Serbia competed at the 2024 World Aquatics Championships in Doha, Qatar from 2 to 18 February.

== Competitors ==
The following is the list of competitors in the Championships.

Sport	Men	Women	Total
Artistic swimming	1	1	2
Diving	2	0	2
Swimming	6	5	11
Water polo	15	0	15
Total	24	6	30

== Artistic swimming ==
Mixed

Athlete	Event	Preliminaries		Final	
Athlete	Event	Points	Rank	Points	Rank
Jelena Kontić; Ivan Martinović	Duet technical routine	187.8333	10 Q	186.0100	10
Jelena Kontić; Ivan Martinović	Duet free routine	156.4125	5 Q	161.5540	6

== Diving ==
Men

Athlete	Event	Preliminaries		Semifinals		Final	
Athlete	Event	Points	Rank	Points	Rank	Points	Rank
Nikola Paraušić	1 m springboard	210.55	37	—		Did not advance	
Nikola Paraušić	3 m springboard	197.40	67	Did not advance			
Aleksa Teofilović	10 m platform	234.95	44	Did not advance			

== Swimming ==
Serbia entered 11 swimmers.

Men

Athlete	Event	Heat		Semifinal		Final	
Athlete	Event	Time	Rank	Time	Rank	Time	Rank
Andrej Barna	50 metre freestyle	22.05	15 Q	21.89 NR	13	Did not advance	
Andrej Barna	100 metre freestyle	48.31	7 Q	48.05	5 Q	48.02	6
Đorđe Matić	50 metre butterfly	23.97	29	Did not advance			
Đorđe Matić	100 metre butterfly	52.81	22	Did not advance			
Velimir Stjepanović	200 metre freestyle	1:47.55	21	Did not advance			
Uroš Živanović	50 metre breaststroke	28.27	26	Did not advance			
Velimir Stjepanović; Andrej Barna; Uroš Nikolić; Nikola Aćin	4 × 100 m freestyle relay	3:14.42	6 Q	—		3:13.88	7
Velimir Stjepanovic; Uros Zivanovic; Durde Matic; Andrej Barna	4 × 100 m medley relay	3:37.98 NR	18	—		Did not advance	

Women

Athlete	Event	Heat		Semifinal		Final	
Athlete	Event	Time	Rank	Time	Rank	Time	Rank
Martina Bukvić	100 metre breaststroke	Did not start		Did not advance			
Martina Bukvić	200 metre breaststroke	Did not start		Did not advance			
Anja Crevar	200 metre butterfly	2:11.63	10 Q	2:10.23	9	Did not advance	
Anja Crevar	400 metre individual medley	4:41.11	2 Q	—		4:38.93	4
Jana Marković	100 metre backstroke	1:03.70	30	Did not advance			
Katarina Milutinović	100 metre freestyle	Did not start		Did not advance			
Nina Stanisavljević	50 metre freestyle	25.55	25	Did not advance			
Nina Stanisavljević	50 metre backstroke	29.00	25	Did not advance			
Katarina Milutinović; Nina Stanisavljević; Jana Marković; Martina Bukvić	4 × 100 m freestyle relay	3:47.12	13	—		Did not advance	

== Water polo ==
Summary

Team	Event	Group stage				Playoff	Quarterfinal	Semifinal	Final / BM	
Team	Event	Opposition Score	Opposition Score	Opposition Score	Rank	Opposition Score	Opposition Score	Opposition Score	Opposition Score	Rank
Serbia	Men's tournament	Japan; W 17–10	Montenegro; W 14–6	United States; W 14–12	1 QF	—	Croatia; L 13–15	Hungary; W 11–10	Greece; L 11–15	6

=== Men's tournament ===
Team roster

The following is the Serbian roster.

Head coach: Uroš Stevanović

- 1 Radoslav Filipović GK
- 2 Dušan Mandić FP
- 3 Strahinja Rašović FP
- 4 Sava Ranđelović FP
- 5 Petar Jakšić FP
- 6 Đorđe Vučinić FP
- 7 Radomir Drašović FP
- 8 Nikola Jakšić FP
- 9 Nemanja Vico FP
- 10 Nemanja Ubović FP
- 11 Nikola Lukić FP
- 12 Viktor Rašović FP
- 13 Branislav Mitrović GK
- 14 Đorđe Lazić FP
- 15 Luka Gladović FP

Group play

Pos	Team	Pld	W	PSW	PSL	L	GF	GA	GD	Pts	Qualification
1	Serbia	3	3	0	0	0	45	28	+17	9	Quarterfinals
2	Montenegro	3	1	1	0	1	30	36	−6	5	Playoffs
3	United States	3	1	0	1	1	41	30	+11	4	Playoffs
4	Japan	3	0	0	0	3	26	48	−22	0	13–16th place semifinals

Source: World Aquatics
Rules for classification: 1) points; 2) head-to-head points; 3) head-to-head goal difference; 4) head-to-head number of goals scored; 5) Goal difference.

5 February 2024; 16:00	Report	Japan	10–17	Serbia	Aspire Dome, Doha; Referees: Georgios Stavridis (GRE), Andrej Franulović (CRO)
5 February 2024; 16:00	Report	Score by quarters: 3–4, 4–4, 1–5, 2–4			Aspire Dome, Doha; Referees: Georgios Stavridis (GRE), Andrej Franulović (CRO)
5 February 2024; 16:00	Report	three players 2	Goals	Jakšić 4	Aspire Dome, Doha; Referees: Georgios Stavridis (GRE), Andrej Franulović (CRO)

7 February 2024; 17:30	Report	Serbia	14–6	Montenegro	Aspire Dome, Doha; Referees: Michiel Zwart (NED), Andrej Franulović (CRO)
7 February 2024; 17:30	Report	Score by quarters: 4–1, 2–2, 5–3, 3–0			Aspire Dome, Doha; Referees: Michiel Zwart (NED), Andrej Franulović (CRO)
7 February 2024; 17:30	Report	Mandić 4	Goals	six players 1	Aspire Dome, Doha; Referees: Michiel Zwart (NED), Andrej Franulović (CRO)

9 February 2024; 17:30	Report	Serbia	14–12	United States	Aspire Dome, Doha; Referees: Boris Margeta (SLO), Georgios Stavridis (GRE)
9 February 2024; 17:30	Report	Score by quarters: 2–3, 3–4, 6–1, 3–4			Aspire Dome, Doha; Referees: Boris Margeta (SLO), Georgios Stavridis (GRE)
9 February 2024; 17:30	Report	three players 3	Goals	Daube 4	Aspire Dome, Doha; Referees: Boris Margeta (SLO), Georgios Stavridis (GRE)

Quarterfinals

13 February 2024; 19:00	Report	Serbia	13–15	Croatia	Aspire Dome, Doha; Referees: Georgios Stavridis (GRE), Frank Ohme (GER)
13 February 2024; 19:00	Report	Score by quarters: 4–4, 5–5, 1–2, 3–4			Aspire Dome, Doha; Referees: Georgios Stavridis (GRE), Frank Ohme (GER)
13 February 2024; 19:00	Report	S. Rašović 3	Goals	Fatović 4	Aspire Dome, Doha; Referees: Georgios Stavridis (GRE), Frank Ohme (GER)

5–8th place semifinals

15 February 2024; 14:30	Report	Serbia	11–10	Hungary	Aspire Dome, Doha; Referees: Andrei Franulovic (CRO), Darren Spiritosanto (USA)
15 February 2024; 14:30	Report	Score by quarters: 5–2, 2–5, 2–1, 2–2			Aspire Dome, Doha; Referees: Andrei Franulovic (CRO), Darren Spiritosanto (USA)
15 February 2024; 14:30	Report	S. Rašović 3	Goals	Zalánki 3	Aspire Dome, Doha; Referees: Andrei Franulovic (CRO), Darren Spiritosanto (USA)

Fifth place game

17 February 2024; 16:00	Report	Greece	15–11	Serbia	Aspire Dome, Doha; Referees: Andrei Franulovic (CRO), Matan Schwartz (ISR)
17 February 2024; 16:00	Report	Score by quarters: 5–2, 3–3, 2–4, 5–2			Aspire Dome, Doha; Referees: Andrei Franulovic (CRO), Matan Schwartz (ISR)
17 February 2024; 16:00	Report	Gkiouvetsis, Kakaris 3	Goals	Drašović 3	Aspire Dome, Doha; Referees: Andrei Franulovic (CRO), Matan Schwartz (ISR)
