= Serbia at the 2019 World Aquatics Championships =

- Flag of Serbia
- World Aquatics code: SRB
- National federation: Serbian Swimming Federation
- Website: serbia-swim.org.rs (in Serbian)

World Aquatics Championships appearances
- 2007; 2009; 2011; 2013; 2015; 2017; 2019; 2022; 2023; 2024; 2025

Other related appearances
- Yugoslavia (1973–1991); Serbia and Montenegro (1998–2005)

Serbia competed at the 2019 World Aquatics Championships in Gwangju, South Korea from 12 to 28 July.

== Artistic swimming ==
Serbia's artistic swimming team consisted of 2 athletes (2 female).

Women

Athlete	Event	Preliminaries		Final	
Athlete	Event	Points	Rank	Points	Rank
Nevena Dimitrijević	Solo free routine	75.4000	23	Did not advance	
Nevena Dimitrijević; Jelena Kontić	Duet technical routine	74.2928	34	Did not advance	
Nevena Dimitrijević; Jelena Kontić	Duet free routine	75.9000	30	Did not advance	

== Open water swimming ==
Serbia qualified one male open water swimmer.

Athlete	Event	Time	Rank
Tamás Farkas	Men's 5 km	53:44.5	27
Tamás Farkas	Men's 10 km	1:52:36.7	48

== Swimming ==
Serbia's swimming team consisted of 7 athletes (6 male, 1 female).

Men

Athlete	Event	Heat		Semifinal		Final	
Athlete	Event	Time	Rank	Time	Rank	Time	Rank
Andrej Barna	50 m freestyle	22.77	44	Did not advance			
Velimir Stjepanović	100 m freestyle	49.44	32	Did not advance			
Velimir Stjepanović	200 m freestyle	1:47.40	19	Did not advance			
Velimir Stjepanović	200 m butterfly	1:57.15	17	Did not advance			
Vuk Čelić	800 m freestyle	7:59.17	23	—		Did not advance	
Vuk Čelić	1500 m freestyle	15:17.79	24	—		Did not advance	
Velimir Stjepanović; Uroš Nikolić; Andrej Barna; Nikola Aćin	4 × 100 metre freestyle relay	3:15.72	15	—		Did not advance	
Velimir Stjepanović; Aleksa Bobar; Vuk Čelić; Andrej Barna	4 × 200 metre freestyle relay	7:15.31 NR	19	—		Did not advance	

Women

Athlete	Event	Heat		Final	
Athlete	Event	Time	Rank	Time	Rank
Anja Crevar	400 metre individual medley	4:41.59	12	Did not advance	

== Water polo ==
Summary

Key:

- PSO – Match decided by penalty-shootout.

Team	Event	Group Stage				Playoffs	Quarterfinals	5th–8th place semifinals	5th place game	
Team	Event	Opposition Score	Opposition Score	Opposition Score	Rank	Opposition Score	Opposition Score	Opposition Score	Opposition Score	Rank
Serbia	Men's tournament	Montenegro; D 10–10	South Korea; W 22–2	Greece; W 9–3	1	Bye	Spain; L 9–12	Germany; W 17–16 (PSO)	Australia; W 13–9	5

=== Men's tournament ===
Team roster

- Strajo Rističević
- Dušan Mandić
- Viktor Rašović
- Sava Ranđelović
- Miloš Ćuk
- Đorđe Lazić
- Nemanja Vico
- Nikola Dedović
- Nikola Jakšić
- Radomir Drašović
- Ognjen Stojanović
- Strahinja Rašović
- Lazar Dobožanov
- Coach: Dejan Savić

Group A

Pos	Team	Pld	W	D	L	GF	GA	GD	Pts	Qualification
1	Serbia	3	2	1	0	41	15	+26	5	Quarterfinals
2	Montenegro	3	1	2	0	44	26	+18	4	Playoffs
3	Greece	3	1	1	1	39	22	+17	3	Playoffs
4	South Korea (H)	3	0	0	3	11	72	−61	0	

Source: Sportresult
Rules for classification: 1) points; 2) head-to-head points; 3) head-to-head goal difference; 4) head-to-head number of goals scored; 5) Goal difference.
(H) Hosts

15 July 2019; 08:30	Report	Serbia	10–10	Montenegro	Nambu University Aquatics Center, Gwangju; Referees: Arkadi Voevodin (RUS), Michiel Zwart (NED)
15 July 2019; 08:30	Report	Score by quarters: 4–3, 2–2, 2–4, 2–1			Nambu University Aquatics Center, Gwangju; Referees: Arkadi Voevodin (RUS), Michiel Zwart (NED)
15 July 2019; 08:30	Report	S. Rašović 4	Goals	four players 2	Nambu University Aquatics Center, Gwangju; Referees: Arkadi Voevodin (RUS), Michiel Zwart (NED)

17 July 2019; 20:30	Report	Serbia	22–2	South Korea	Nambu University Aquatics Center, Gwangju; Referees: Ni Shi Wei (CHN), John Waldow (NZL)
17 July 2019; 20:30	Report	Score by quarters: 6–1, 5–0, 4–1, 7–0			Nambu University Aquatics Center, Gwangju; Referees: Ni Shi Wei (CHN), John Waldow (NZL)
17 July 2019; 20:30	Report	Jakšić 5	Goals	Han H., Lee Seong. 1	Nambu University Aquatics Center, Gwangju; Referees: Ni Shi Wei (CHN), John Waldow (NZL)

19 July 2019; 16:30	Report	Serbia	9–3	Greece	Nambu University Aquatics Center, Gwangju; Referees: Boris Margeta (SLO), Germán Moller (ARG)
19 July 2019; 16:30	Report	Score by quarters: 3–1, 3–2, 0–0, 3–0			Nambu University Aquatics Center, Gwangju; Referees: Boris Margeta (SLO), Germán Moller (ARG)
19 July 2019; 16:30	Report	Mandić 4	Goals	three players 1	Nambu University Aquatics Center, Gwangju; Referees: Boris Margeta (SLO), Germán Moller (ARG)

Quarterfinals

23 July 2019; 14:00	Report	Serbia	9–12	Spain	Nambu University Aquatics Center, Gwangju; Referees: Georgios Stavridis (GRE), Michiel Zwart (NED)
23 July 2019; 14:00	Report	Score by quarters: 1–2, 2–5, 4–3, 2–2			Nambu University Aquatics Center, Gwangju; Referees: Georgios Stavridis (GRE), Michiel Zwart (NED)
23 July 2019; 14:00	Report	S. Rašović 4	Goals	three players 2	Nambu University Aquatics Center, Gwangju; Referees: Georgios Stavridis (GRE), Michiel Zwart (NED)

5th–8th place semifinals

25 July 2019; 14:00	Report	Serbia	17–16	Germany	Nambu University Aquatics Center, Gwangju; Referees: Dion Willis (RSA), Sebastien Dervieux (FRA)
25 July 2019; 14:00	Report	Score by quarters: 3–3, 3–3, 2–3, 4–3 PSO: 5–4			Nambu University Aquatics Center, Gwangju; Referees: Dion Willis (RSA), Sebastien Dervieux (FRA)
25 July 2019; 14:00	Report	Mandić 5	Goals	three players 2	Nambu University Aquatics Center, Gwangju; Referees: Dion Willis (RSA), Sebastien Dervieux (FRA)

5th place game

27 July 2019; 15:30	Report	Serbia	13–9	Australia	Nambu University Aquatics Center, Gwangju; Referees: Dion Willis (RSA), Sebastien Dervieux (FRA)
27 July 2019; 15:30	Report	Score by quarters: 6–1, 3–2, 1–2, 3–4			Nambu University Aquatics Center, Gwangju; Referees: Dion Willis (RSA), Sebastien Dervieux (FRA)
27 July 2019; 15:30	Report	Ćuk, Rašović 4	Goals	Ford, Younger 2	Nambu University Aquatics Center, Gwangju; Referees: Dion Willis (RSA), Sebastien Dervieux (FRA)
