= Serbia at the 2017 World Aquatics Championships =

- Flag of Serbia
- FINA code: SRB
- National federation: Plivački Savez Srbije
- Website: www.serbia-swim.org.rs

in Budapest, Hungary
- Competitors: 28 in 5 sports
- Medals Ranked 26th: Gold 0 Silver 0 Bronze 1 Total 1

World Aquatics Championships appearances
- 2007; 2009; 2011; 2013; 2015; 2017; 2019; 2022; 2023; 2024

Other related appearances
- Yugoslavia (1973–1991); Serbia and Montenegro (1998–2005)

Serbia is scheduled to compete at the 2017 World Aquatics Championships in Budapest, Hungary from 14 July to 30 July.

== Medalists ==
Medal	Name	Sport	Event	Date
Bronze	Serbia men's national water polo team: Gojko Pijetlović; Dušan Mandić; Viktor Rašović; Sava Ranđelović; Miloš Ćuk; Duško Pijetlović; Nemanja Ubović; Milan Aleksić; Nikola Jakšić; Filip Filipović; Andrija Prlainović; Stefan Mitrović; Branislav Mitrović	Water polo	Men's tournament	29 July

== Diving ==
Serbia has entered 1 diver (one female).

Athlete	Event	Preliminaries		Final	
Athlete	Event	Points	Rank	Points	Rank
Jelena Baković	Women's 1 m springboard	188.50	40	did not advance	

== Open water swimming ==
Serbia has entered three open water swimmers (two male and one female).

Athlete	Event	Time	Rank
Bence Balzam	Men's 5 km	1:00:11.2	53
Bence Balzam	Men's 10 km	2:00:01.4	51
Tamás Farkas	Men's 5 km	55:14.4	28
Tamás Farkas	Men's 10 km	1:54:34.0	36
Jelena Ječanski	Women's 5 km	1:04:31.3	44
Jelena Ječanski	Women's 10 km	2:16:10.6	51

== Swimming ==
Serbian swimmers have achieved qualifying standards in the following events (up to a maximum of 2 swimmers in each event at the A-standard entry time, and 1 at the B-standard):

Men

Athlete	Event	Heat		Semifinal		Final	
Athlete	Event	Time	Rank	Time	Rank	Time	Rank
Andrej Barna	50 m freestyle	22.61	33	did not advance			
Vuk Čelić	200 m backstroke	2:00.27	25	did not advance			
Sebastian Sabo	50 m butterfly	23.51	12 Q	23.54	13	did not advance	
Sebastian Sabo	100 m butterfly	52.16	19	did not advance			
Čaba Silađi	50 m breaststroke	27.27	=13 Q	27.18	12	did not advance	
Čaba Silađi	100 m breaststroke	1:00.28	23	did not advance			
Stefan Šorak	200 m individual medley	2:03.45	29	did not advance			
Velimir Stjepanović	100 m freestyle	48.80	16 Q	48.66	12	did not advance	
Velimir Stjepanović	200 m freestyle	1:47.05	12 Q	1:46.82	12	did not advance	
Andrej Barna; Ivan Lenđer; Uroš Nikolić; Velimir Stjepanović	4×100 m freestyle relay	3:15.64	9	—		did not advance	
Ivan Lenđer; Uroš Nikolić; Stefan Šorak; Velimir Stjepanović	4×200 m freestyle relay	7:18.68	15	—		did not advance	

Women

Athlete	Event	Heat		Final	
Athlete	Event	Time	Rank	Time	Rank
Anja Crevar	400 m individual medley	4:48.53	22	did not advance	

== Synchronized swimming ==
Serbia's synchronized swimming team consisted of 2 athletes (2 female).

Athlete	Event	Preliminaries		Final	
Athlete	Event	Points	Rank	Points	Rank
Nevena Dimitrijević	Solo technical routine	69.8904	27	did not advance	
Nevena Dimitrijević	Solo free routine	72.7333	24	did not advance	
Nevena Dimitrijević; Jelena Kontić	Duet free routine	73.0667	33	did not advance	

== Water polo ==
Serbia qualified a men's team.

Summary

Key:

- PSO – Match decided by penalty-shootout.

Team	Event	Group Stage				Playoffs	Quarterfinals	Semifinals	Final / BM	
Team	Event	Opposition Score	Opposition Score	Opposition Score	Rank	Opposition Score	Opposition Score	Opposition Score	Opposition Score	Rank
Serbia	Men's tournament	South Africa; W 21–5	Spain; W 11–5	Greece; W 11–6	1	Bye	Australia; W 15–5	Croatia; L 11–12	Greece; W 11–8	3rd place, bronze medalist(s)

=== Men's tournament ===
Team roster

- Gojko Pijetlović
- Dušan Mandić
- Viktor Rašović
- Sava Ranđelović
- Miloš Ćuk
- Duško Pijetlović
- Nemanja Ubović
- Milan Aleksić
- Nikola Jakšić
- Filip Filipović (c)
- Andrija Prlainović
- Nenad Mitrović
- Branislav Mitrović

Group play

Pos	Team	Pld	W	D	L	GF	GA	GD	Pts	Qualification
1	Serbia	3	3	0	0	43	16	+27	6	Quarterfinals
2	Greece	3	2	0	1	32	20	+12	4	Playoffs
3	Spain	3	1	0	2	28	23	+5	2	Playoffs
4	South Africa	3	0	0	3	11	55	−44	0	

Source: Sportresult
Rules for classification: 1) points; 2) head-to-head points; 3) head-to-head goal difference; 4) head-to-head number of goals scored; 5) better result against higher placed team.

17 July 2017; 17:30	Report	Serbia	21–5	South Africa	Alfréd Hajós National Swimming Stadium, Budapest; Referees: Michael Brooks (NZL), Nader Ghafouri (IRI)
17 July 2017; 17:30	Report	Score by quarters: 6–1, 7–1, 5–1, 3–2			Alfréd Hajós National Swimming Stadium, Budapest; Referees: Michael Brooks (NZL), Nader Ghafouri (IRI)
17 July 2017; 17:30	Report	three players 3	Goals	Le Roux 2	Alfréd Hajós National Swimming Stadium, Budapest; Referees: Michael Brooks (NZL), Nader Ghafouri (IRI)

19 July 2017; 12:10	Report	Spain	5–11	Serbia	Alfréd Hajós National Swimming Stadium, Budapest; Referees: Adrian Alexandrescu (ROU), Mikhail Dykman (CAN)
19 July 2017; 12:10	Report	Score by quarters: 1–3, 0–2, 2–3, 2–3			Alfréd Hajós National Swimming Stadium, Budapest; Referees: Adrian Alexandrescu (ROU), Mikhail Dykman (CAN)
19 July 2017; 12:10	Report	Bustos 2	Goals	three players 2	Alfréd Hajós National Swimming Stadium, Budapest; Referees: Adrian Alexandrescu (ROU), Mikhail Dykman (CAN)

21 July 2017; 10:50	Report	Serbia	11–6	Greece	Alfréd Hajós National Swimming Stadium, Budapest; Referees: Péter Molnár (HUN), Frank Ohme (GER)
21 July 2017; 10:50	Report	Score by quarters: 2–1, 3–3, 3–0, 3–2			Alfréd Hajós National Swimming Stadium, Budapest; Referees: Péter Molnár (HUN), Frank Ohme (GER)
21 July 2017; 10:50	Report	Filipović 3	Goals	Delakas, Fountoulis 2	Alfréd Hajós National Swimming Stadium, Budapest; Referees: Péter Molnár (HUN), Frank Ohme (GER)

Quarterfinals

25 July 2017; 16:10	Report	Serbia	15–5	Australia	Alfréd Hajós National Swimming Stadium, Budapest; Referees: Sergey Naumov (RUS), Frank Ohme (GER)
25 July 2017; 16:10	Report	Score by quarters: 4–1, 4–2, 4–2, 3–0			Alfréd Hajós National Swimming Stadium, Budapest; Referees: Sergey Naumov (RUS), Frank Ohme (GER)
25 July 2017; 16:10	Report	Filipović 3	Goals	five players 1	Alfréd Hajós National Swimming Stadium, Budapest; Referees: Sergey Naumov (RUS), Frank Ohme (GER)

Semifinals

27 July 2017; 22:00	Report	Serbia	11–12	Croatia	Alfréd Hajós National Swimming Stadium, Budapest; Referees: Steven Rotsart (USA), Adrian Alexandrescu (ROU)
27 July 2017; 22:00	Report	Score by quarters: 1–1, 4–4, 4–4, 2–3			Alfréd Hajós National Swimming Stadium, Budapest; Referees: Steven Rotsart (USA), Adrian Alexandrescu (ROU)
27 July 2017; 22:00	Report	Prlainović 6	Goals	Joković, Sukno 3	Alfréd Hajós National Swimming Stadium, Budapest; Referees: Steven Rotsart (USA), Adrian Alexandrescu (ROU)

Third place game

29 July 2017; 15:00	Report	Greece	8–11	Serbia	Alfréd Hajós National Swimming Stadium, Budapest; Referees: Sergey Naumov (RUS), Benjamin Mercier (FRA)
29 July 2017; 15:00	Report	Score by quarters: 3–5, 1–2, 3–3, 1–1			Alfréd Hajós National Swimming Stadium, Budapest; Referees: Sergey Naumov (RUS), Benjamin Mercier (FRA)
29 July 2017; 15:00	Report	Fountoulis 3	Goals	D. Pijetlović, Ranđelović 2	Alfréd Hajós National Swimming Stadium, Budapest; Referees: Sergey Naumov (RUS), Benjamin Mercier (FRA)
