= Serbia at the 2015 World Aquatics Championships =

- Flag of Serbia
- World Aquatics code: SRB
- National federation: Plivački Savez Srbije
- Website: www.serbia-swim.org.rs

in Kazan, Russia
- Competitors: 27 in 3 sports
- Medals Ranked 15th: Gold 1 Silver 0 Bronze 0 Total 1

World Aquatics Championships appearances
- 2007; 2009; 2011; 2013; 2015; 2017; 2019; 2022; 2023; 2024; 2025

Other related appearances
- Yugoslavia (1973–1991); Serbia and Montenegro (1998–2005)

Serbia competed at the 2015 World Aquatics Championships in Kazan, Russia from 24 July to 9 August 2015.

== Medalists ==
Medal	Name	Sport	Event	Date
Gold	Serbia men's national water polo team: Milan Aleksić; Miloš Ćuk; Filip Filipović; Živko Gocić; Nikola Jakšić; Dušan Mandić; Branislav Mitrović; Stefan Mitrović; Slobodan Nikić; Duško Pijetlović; Gojko Pijetlović; Andrija Prlainović; Radomir Drašović	Water polo	Men's tournament	August 8

== Open water swimming ==
Serbia has nominated one swimmer to compete in the open water marathon.

Athlete	Event	Time	Rank
Tamás Farkas	Men's 5 km	55:38.6	30
Tamás Farkas	Men's 10 km	1:58:22.1	57

== Swimming ==
Serbian swimmers have achieved qualifying standards in the following events (up to a maximum of 2 swimmers in each event at the A-standard entry time, and 1 at the B-standard):

Men

Athlete	Event	Heat		Semifinal		Final	
Athlete	Event	Time	Rank	Time	Rank	Time	Rank
Vuk Čelić	800 m freestyle	8:05.68	29	—N/a		did not advance	
Vuk Čelić	1500 m freestyle	15:33.71	33	—N/a		did not advance	
Vuk Čelić	200 m backstroke	2:05.54	33	did not advance			
Ivan Lenđer	50 m butterfly	23.87	=21	did not advance			
Ivan Lenđer	100 m butterfly	53.04	31	did not advance			
Petar Petrović	100 m backstroke	57.44	45	did not advance			
Čaba Silađi	50 m breaststroke	27.19	6 Q	27.19	7 Q	27.45	8
Čaba Silađi	100 m breaststroke	1:00.35	16 Q	1:00.62	16	did not advance	
Velimir Stjepanović	100 m freestyle	50.07	41	did not advance			
Velimir Stjepanović	200 m freestyle	1:47.10	11 Q	1:46.85	10	did not advance	
Velimir Stjepanović	400 m freestyle	3:49.49	19	—N/a		did not advance	
Boris Stojanović	50 m freestyle	22.81	31	did not advance			
Ivan Lenđer; Uroš Nikolić; Andrej Barna; Boris Stojanović	4 × 100 m freestyle relay	3:21.21	21	—N/a		did not advance	
Stefan Šorak; Velimir Stjepanović; Uroš Nikolić; Vuk Čelić	4 × 200 m freestyle relay	7:20.29	18	—N/a		did not advance	

Women

Athlete	Event	Heat		Semifinal		Final	
Athlete	Event	Time	Rank	Time	Rank	Time	Rank
Jovana Bogdanović	200 m breaststroke	2:35.88	40	did not advance			
Anja Crevar	200 m individual medley	2:21.51	35	did not advance			
Anja Crevar	400 m individual medley	4:50.04	26	—N/a		did not advance	
Miroslava Najdanovski	50 m freestyle	26.89	56	did not advance			
Miroslava Najdanovski	100 m freestyle	57.34	47	did not advance			
Katarina Simonović	200 m freestyle	2:03.21	44	did not advance			
Katarina Simonović	400 m freestyle	4:20.94	35	—N/a		did not advance	

Mixed

Athlete	Event	Heat		Final	
Athlete	Event	Time	Rank	Time	Rank
Andrej Barna; Uroš Nikolić; Miroslava Najdanovski; Anja Crevar	4 × 100 m freestyle relay	3:38.66	16	did not advance	

== Water polo ==
=== Men's tournament ===
Team roster

- Gojko Pijetlović
- Dušan Mandić
- Živko Gocić
- Radomir Drašović
- Miloš Ćuk
- Duško Pijetlović
- Slobodan Nikić
- Milan Aleksić
- Nikola Jakšić
- Filip Filipović
- Andrija Prlainović
- Stefan Mitrović
- Branislav Mitrović

Group play

Pos	Team	Pld	W	D	L	GF	GA	GD	Pts	Qualification
1	Serbia	3	3	0	0	40	26	+14	6	Advanced to quarterfinals
2	Australia	3	1	1	1	24	19	+5	3	Advanced to playoffs
3	Montenegro	3	1	1	1	29	26	+3	3	Advanced to playoffs
4	Japan	3	0	0	3	23	45	−22	0	

Source: SportResult.com
Rules for classification: 1) points; 2) head-to-head points; 3) head-to-head goal difference; 4) head-to-head number of goals scored; 5) goal difference.

27 July 2015; 20:10	Report	Serbia	11–8	Montenegro	Kazan; Attendance: 2,279; Referees: Georgios Stavridis (GRE), Adrian Alexandrescu (ROU)
27 July 2015; 20:10	Report	Score by quarters: 2–1, 4–2, 3–4, 2–1			Kazan; Attendance: 2,279; Referees: Georgios Stavridis (GRE), Adrian Alexandrescu (ROU)
27 July 2015; 20:10	Report	Filipović 3	Goals	three players 2	Kazan; Attendance: 2,279; Referees: Georgios Stavridis (GRE), Adrian Alexandrescu (ROU)

29 July 2015; 17:30	Report	Serbia	19–9	Japan	Kazan; Attendance: 1,016; Referees: Masoud Rezvani (IRI), Stephane Roy (CAN)
29 July 2015; 17:30	Report	Score by quarters: 2–1, 6–2, 5–3, 6–3			Kazan; Attendance: 1,016; Referees: Masoud Rezvani (IRI), Stephane Roy (CAN)
29 July 2015; 17:30	Report	Nikić 6	Goals	Okawa, Takei 3	Kazan; Attendance: 1,016; Referees: Masoud Rezvani (IRI), Stephane Roy (CAN)

31 July 2015; 12:10	Report	Serbia	10–9	Australia	Kazan; Attendance: 890; Referees: Radosław Koryzna (POL), Georgios Stacridis (GRE)
31 July 2015; 12:10	Report	Score by quarters: 3–2, 2–2, 1–4, 4–1			Kazan; Attendance: 890; Referees: Radosław Koryzna (POL), Georgios Stacridis (GRE)
31 July 2015; 12:10	Report	three players 2	Goals	Younger 3	Kazan; Attendance: 890; Referees: Radosław Koryzna (POL), Georgios Stacridis (GRE)

Quarterfinals

4 August 2015; 21:30	Report	Serbia	12–7	United States	Kazan; Attendance: 455; Referees: Francesc Buch (ESP), Nenad Peris (CRO)
4 August 2015; 21:30	Report	Score by quarters: 4–2, 3–3, 2–1, 3–1			Kazan; Attendance: 455; Referees: Francesc Buch (ESP), Nenad Peris (CRO)
4 August 2015; 21:30	Report	Pijetlović 4	Goals	Bonanni 2	Kazan; Attendance: 455; Referees: Francesc Buch (ESP), Nenad Peris (CRO)

Semifinals

6 August 2015; 22:00	Report	Italy	6–10	Serbia	Kazan; Attendance: 1,859; Referees: Boris Margeta (SLO), Radosław Koryzna (POL)
6 August 2015; 22:00	Report	Score by quarters: 0–4, 2–4, 2–1, 2–1			Kazan; Attendance: 1,859; Referees: Boris Margeta (SLO), Radosław Koryzna (POL)
6 August 2015; 22:00	Report	Fondelli 2	Goals	S. Mitrovic 3	Kazan; Attendance: 1,859; Referees: Boris Margeta (SLO), Radosław Koryzna (POL)

Final

8 August 2015; 22:00	Report	Croatia	4–11	Serbia	Kazan; Attendance: 2,575; Referees: Boris Margeta (SLO), Georgios Stavridis (GRE)
8 August 2015; 22:00	Report	Score by quarters: 2–2, 0–3, 2–2, 0–4			Kazan; Attendance: 2,575; Referees: Boris Margeta (SLO), Georgios Stavridis (GRE)
8 August 2015; 22:00	Report	Sukno 2	Goals	Prlainović 3	Kazan; Attendance: 2,575; Referees: Boris Margeta (SLO), Georgios Stavridis (GRE)
