= Serbia at the 2023 World Aquatics Championships =

- Flag of Serbia
- World Aquatics code: SRB
- National federation: Serbian Swimming Federation
- Website: serbia-swim.org.rs (in Serbian)

in Fukuoka, Japan
- Competitors: 23 in 4 sports
- Medals: Gold 0 Silver 0 Bronze 0 Total 0

World Aquatics Championships appearances
- 2007; 2009; 2011; 2013; 2015; 2017; 2019; 2022; 2023; 2024; 2025

Other related appearances
- Yugoslavia (1973–1991); Serbia and Montenegro (1998–2005)

Serbia competed at the 2023 World Aquatics Championships in Fukuoka, Japan from 14 to 30 July.

== Artistic swimming ==
Serbia entered 2 artistic swimmers.

Mixed

Athlete	Event	Preliminaries		Final	
Athlete	Event	Points	Rank	Points	Rank
Jelena Kontić; Ivan Martinović	Duet technical routine	169.6216	11 Q	191.1167	9
Jelena Kontić; Ivan Martinović	Duet free routine	143.0189	8 Q	146.5708	6

== Open water swimming ==
Serbia entered 1 open water swimmer.

Men

Athlete	Event	Time	Rank
Tamás Farkas	Men's 5 km	56:53.5	25

== Swimming ==
Serbia entered 5 swimmers.

Men

Athlete	Event	Heat		Semifinal		Final	
Athlete	Event	Time	Rank	Time	Rank	Time	Rank
Andrej Barna	50 metre freestyle	22.52	40	Did not advance			
Andrej Barna	100 metre freestyle	48.20	12 Q	48.43	15	Did not advance	
Velimir Stjepanović	200 metre freestyle	1:47.93	27	Did not advance			
Velimir Stjepanović	400 metre freestyle	3:54.25	30	—N/a		Did not advance	
Velimir Stjepanović; Andrej Barna; Nikola Aćin; Uroš Nikolić	4 × 100 metre freestyle relay	3:14.36	10	—N/a		Did not advance	

Women

Athlete	Event	Heat		Semifinal		Final	
Athlete	Event	Time	Rank	Time	Rank	Time	Rank
Anja Crevar	200 metre butterfly	2:10.98	16 Q	2:11.65	16	Did not advance	
Anja Crevar	400 metre individual medley	4:46.26	22	—N/a		Did not advance	

== Water polo ==
Summary

Team	Event	Group stage				Playoff	Quarterfinal	Semifinal	Final / BM	
Team	Event	Opposition Score	Opposition Score	Opposition Score	Rank	Opposition Score	Opposition Score	Opposition Score	Opposition Score	Rank
Serbia	Men's tournament	Spain; L 14–16	South Africa; W 30–5	Montenegro; W 17–15	2 QP	Japan; W 16–10	Italy; W 15–14	Greece; L 7–13	Spain; L 6–9	4

=== Men's tournament ===
Team roster

The following is the Serbian roster.

Head coach: Uroš Stevanović

- 1 Vladimir Mišović GK
- 2 Marko Radulović FP
- 3 Strahinja Rašović FP
- 4 Sava Ranđelović FP
- 5 Đorđe Lazić FP
- 6 Vuk Milojević FP
- 7 Radomir Drašović FP
- 8 Nikola Jakšić FP
- 9 Filip Janković FP
- 10 Nemanja Ubović FP
- 11 Đorđe Vučinić FP
- 12 Vasilije Martinović FP
- 13 Branislav Mitrović GK
- Bogdan Gavrilović FP
- Marko Dimitrijević FP

Group play

Pos	Team	Pld	W	PSW	PSL	L	GF	GA	GD	Pts	Qualification
1	Spain	3	3	0	0	0	54	27	+27	9	Quarterfinals
2	Serbia	3	1	1	0	1	57	34	+23	5	Playoffs
3	Montenegro	3	1	0	1	1	55	34	+21	4	Playoffs
4	South Africa	3	0	0	0	3	21	92	−71	0	

Source: Sportresult
Rules for classification: 1) points; 2) head-to-head points; 3) head-to-head goal difference; 4) head-to-head number of goals scored; 5) Goal difference.

17 July 2023; 20:30	Report	Serbia	14–16	Spain	Marine Messe Fukuoka, Fukuoka; Referees: Boris Margeta (SLO), Raffaele Colombo (ITA)
17 July 2023; 20:30	Report	Score by quarters: 2–3, 3–5, 5–5, 4–3			Marine Messe Fukuoka, Fukuoka; Referees: Boris Margeta (SLO), Raffaele Colombo (ITA)
17 July 2023; 20:30	Report	Rašović 6	Goals	Granados 5	Marine Messe Fukuoka, Fukuoka; Referees: Boris Margeta (SLO), Raffaele Colombo (ITA)

19 July 2023; 16:00	Report	South Africa	5–30	Serbia	Marine Messe Fukuoka, Fukuoka; Referees: David Couper (NZL), Chisato Kurosaki (JPN)
19 July 2023; 16:00	Report	Score by quarters: 1–8, 1–9, 1–7, 2–6			Marine Messe Fukuoka, Fukuoka; Referees: David Couper (NZL), Chisato Kurosaki (JPN)
19 July 2023; 16:00	Report	Laurenson 2	Goals	Jakšić, Rašović 6	Marine Messe Fukuoka, Fukuoka; Referees: David Couper (NZL), Chisato Kurosaki (JPN)

21 July 2023; 12:00	Report	Serbia	17–15 (PSO)	Montenegro	Marine Messe Fukuoka, Fukuoka; Referees: Adrian-Tiberiu Alexandrescu (ROU), Darren Spiritsanto (USA)
21 July 2023; 12:00	Report	Score by quarters: 3–6, 4–2, 2–3, 4–2 PSO: 4–2			Marine Messe Fukuoka, Fukuoka; Referees: Adrian-Tiberiu Alexandrescu (ROU), Darren Spiritsanto (USA)
21 July 2023; 12:00	Report	Vučinić 5	Goals	Matković 3	Marine Messe Fukuoka, Fukuoka; Referees: Adrian-Tiberiu Alexandrescu (ROU), Darren Spiritsanto (USA)

Playoffs

23 July 2023; 18:30	Report	Japan	10–16	Serbia	Marine Messe Fukuoka, Fukuoka; Referees: Tamás Kovács-Csatlós (HUN), Veselin Mišković (MNE)
23 July 2023; 18:30	Report	Score by quarters: 3–3, 2–3, 2–7, 3–3			Marine Messe Fukuoka, Fukuoka; Referees: Tamás Kovács-Csatlós (HUN), Veselin Mišković (MNE)
23 July 2023; 18:30	Report	Inaba 4	Goals	Radulović, Rašović 3	Marine Messe Fukuoka, Fukuoka; Referees: Tamás Kovács-Csatlós (HUN), Veselin Mišković (MNE)

Quarterfinals

25 July 2023; 16:30	Report	Italy	14–15 (PSO)	Serbia	Marine Messe Fukuoka, Fukuoka; Referees: Michiel Zwartt (NED), Frank Ohme (GER)
25 July 2023; 16:30	Report	Score by quarters: 3–3, 2–2, 4–4, 2–2 PSO: 3–4			Marine Messe Fukuoka, Fukuoka; Referees: Michiel Zwartt (NED), Frank Ohme (GER)
25 July 2023; 16:30	Report	Di Fulvio 3	Goals	Rašović 4	Marine Messe Fukuoka, Fukuoka; Referees: Michiel Zwartt (NED), Frank Ohme (GER)

Semifinals

27 July 2023; 17:00	Report	Greece	13–7	Serbia	Marine Messe Fukuoka, Fukuoka; Referees: Nenad Peris (CRO), Raffaele Colombo (ITA)
27 July 2023; 17:00	Report	Score by quarters: 3–2, 3–0, 3–3, 4–2			Marine Messe Fukuoka, Fukuoka; Referees: Nenad Peris (CRO), Raffaele Colombo (ITA)
27 July 2023; 17:00	Report	Argyropoulos, Kakaris 3	Goals	Jakšić, Rašović 2	Marine Messe Fukuoka, Fukuoka; Referees: Nenad Peris (CRO), Raffaele Colombo (ITA)

Third place game

29 July 2023; 13:00	Report	Serbia	6–9	Spain	Marine Messe Fukuoka, Fukuoka; Referees: Frank Ohme (GER), Raffaele Colombo (ITA)
29 July 2023; 13:00	Report	Score by quarters: 3–3, 2–3, 0–2, 1–1			Marine Messe Fukuoka, Fukuoka; Referees: Frank Ohme (GER), Raffaele Colombo (ITA)
29 July 2023; 13:00	Report	Rašović 3	Goals	Granados 3	Marine Messe Fukuoka, Fukuoka; Referees: Frank Ohme (GER), Raffaele Colombo (ITA)
