= Serbia at the 2022 World Aquatics Championships =

- Flag of Serbia
- FINA code: SRB
- National federation: Serbian Swimming Federation
- Website: serbia-swim.org.rs (in Serbian)

in Budapest, Hungary
- Competitors: 20 in 4 sports
- Medals: Gold 0 Silver 0 Bronze 0 Total 0

World Aquatics Championships appearances
- 2007; 2009; 2011; 2013; 2015; 2017; 2019; 2022; 2023; 2024

Other related appearances
- Yugoslavia (1973–1991); Serbia and Montenegro (1998–2005)

Serbia competed at the 2022 World Aquatics Championships in Budapest, Hungary from 17 June to 3 July 2022.

== Artistic swimming ==
Serbia's artistic swimming team consisted of 2 athletes (2 female).

Women

Athlete	Event	Preliminaries		Final	
Athlete	Event	Points	Rank	Points	Rank
Sofija Džipković; Jelena Kontić	Duet technical routine	76.3368	17	Did not advance	
Sofija Džipković; Jelena Kontić	Duet free routine	76.5667	20	Did not advance	

== Open water swimming ==
Serbia qualified one male open water swimmer.

Athlete	Event	Time	Rank
Tamás Farkas	Men's 5 km	56:30.9	27
Tamás Farkas	Men's 10 km	1:57:19.2	27

== Swimming ==
Serbia's swimming team consisted of 4 male athletes.

Men

Athlete	Event	Heat		Semifinal		Final	
Athlete	Event	Time	Rank	Time	Rank	Time	Rank
Andrej Barna	50 m freestyle	22.30	22	Did not advance			
Andrej Barna	100 m freestyle	48.15	3 Q	47.97	10	Did not advance	
Velimir Stjepanović	200 m freestyle	1:47.94	23	Did not advance			
Velimir Stjepanović	200 m butterfly	1:59.44	26	Did not advance			
Velimir Stjepanović; Uroš Nikolić; Andrej Barna; Nikola Aćin	4 × 100 metre freestyle relay	3:14.26	8 Q	—		3:13.83	8

== Water polo ==
Summary

Team	Event	Group Stage				Playoffs	Quarterfinals	5th–8th place semifinals	5th place game	
Team	Event	Opposition Score	Opposition Score	Opposition Score	Rank	Opposition Score	Opposition Score	Opposition Score	Opposition Score	Rank
Serbia	Men's tournament	United States; W 17–13	Australia; W 6–5	Kazakhstan; W 22–3	1 Q	Bye	Croatia; L 12–14	Montenegro; W 10–7	United States; W 13–10	5

=== Men's tournament ===
Team roster

The following is Serbian roster in the Water polo at the 2022 World Aquatics Championships – Men's tournament.

Head coach: Dejan Savić

- 1 Lazar Dobožanov GK
- 2 Dušan Mandić FP
- 3 Gavril Subotić FP
- 4 Sava Ranđelović FP
- 5 Đorđe Lazić CF
- 6 Nemanja Vico CF
- 7 Strahinja Rašović FP
- 8 Nikola Lukić FP
- 9 Nikola Jakšić FP
- 10 Marko Radulović FP
- 11 Radomir Drašović FP
- 12 Viktor Rašović FP
- 13 Branislav Mitrović GK

Group play

Pos	Team	Pld	W	D	L	GF	GA	GD	Pts	Qualification
1	Serbia	3	3	0	0	45	21	+24	6	Quarterfinals
2	United States	3	2	0	1	44	30	+14	4	Playoffs
3	Australia	3	1	0	2	24	24	0	2	Playoffs
4	Kazakhstan	3	0	0	3	11	49	−38	0	

Source: Sportresult
Rules for classification: 1) points; 2) head-to-head points; 3) head-to-head goal difference; 4) head-to-head number of goals scored; 5) Goal difference.

21 June 2022; 19:30	Report	United States	13–17	Serbia	Szeged Tiszavirág Pool, Szeged; Referees: Georgios Stavridis (GRE), Raffaele Colombo (ITA)
21 June 2022; 19:30	Report	Score by quarters: 5–5, 2–3, 3–3, 3–6			Szeged Tiszavirág Pool, Szeged; Referees: Georgios Stavridis (GRE), Raffaele Colombo (ITA)
21 June 2022; 19:30	Report	Bowen 4	Goals	Mandić 4	Szeged Tiszavirág Pool, Szeged; Referees: Georgios Stavridis (GRE), Raffaele Colombo (ITA)

23 June 2022; 18:00	Report	Serbia	6–5	Australia	Szeged Tiszavirág Pool, Szeged; Referees: Raffaele Colombo (ITA), David Gómez (ESP)
23 June 2022; 18:00	Report	Score by quarters: 1–1, 2–2, 2–2, 1–0			Szeged Tiszavirág Pool, Szeged; Referees: Raffaele Colombo (ITA), David Gómez (ESP)
23 June 2022; 18:00	Report	Lukić, Mandić 2	Goals	Edwards, Power 2	Szeged Tiszavirág Pool, Szeged; Referees: Raffaele Colombo (ITA), David Gómez (ESP)

25 June 2022; 18:00	Report	Kazakhstan	3–22	Serbia	Szeged Tiszavirág Pool, Szeged; Referees: Raffaele Colombo (ITA), Fabio Toffoli (BRA)
25 June 2022; 18:00	Report	Score by quarters: 0–4, 1–8, 0–5, 2–5			Szeged Tiszavirág Pool, Szeged; Referees: Raffaele Colombo (ITA), Fabio Toffoli (BRA)
25 June 2022; 18:00	Report	Vuksanović 3	Goals	S. Rašović 6	Szeged Tiszavirág Pool, Szeged; Referees: Raffaele Colombo (ITA), Fabio Toffoli (BRA)

Quarterfinals

29 June 2022; 16:00	Report	Serbia	12–14	Croatia	Alfréd Hajós National Swimming Stadium, Budapest; Referees: Georgios Stavridis (GRE), György Kun (HUN)
29 June 2022; 16:00	Report	Score by quarters: 1–1, 3–4, 5–5, 3–4			Alfréd Hajós National Swimming Stadium, Budapest; Referees: Georgios Stavridis (GRE), György Kun (HUN)
29 June 2022; 16:00	Report	Mandić 4	Goals	four players 2	Alfréd Hajós National Swimming Stadium, Budapest; Referees: Georgios Stavridis (GRE), György Kun (HUN)

5–8th place semifinals

1 July 2022; 14:30	Report	Montenegro	7–10	Serbia	Alfréd Hajós National Swimming Stadium, Budapest; Referees: Georgios Stavridis (GRE), David Gómez (ESP)
1 July 2022; 14:30	Report	Score by quarters: 2–2, 2–3, 2–3, 1–2			Alfréd Hajós National Swimming Stadium, Budapest; Referees: Georgios Stavridis (GRE), David Gómez (ESP)
1 July 2022; 14:30	Report	Đurđić 3	Goals	Jakšić, S. Rašović 3	Alfréd Hajós National Swimming Stadium, Budapest; Referees: Georgios Stavridis (GRE), David Gómez (ESP)

Fifth place game

3 July 2022; 17:00	Report	United States	10–13	Serbia	Alfréd Hajós National Swimming Stadium, Budapest; Referees: György Kun (HUN), Raffaele Colombo (ITA)
3 July 2022; 17:00	Report	Score by quarters: 3–3, 3–5, 1–3, 3–2			Alfréd Hajós National Swimming Stadium, Budapest; Referees: György Kun (HUN), Raffaele Colombo (ITA)
3 July 2022; 17:00	Report	Bowen 4	Goals	S. Rašović 4	Alfréd Hajós National Swimming Stadium, Budapest; Referees: György Kun (HUN), Raffaele Colombo (ITA)
