= Serbia at the 2013 World Aquatics Championships =

- Flag of Serbia
- World Aquatics code: SRB
- National federation: Plivački Savez Srbije
- Website: www.serbia-swim.org.rs

in Barcelona, Spain
- Medals: Gold 0 Silver 0 Bronze 0 Total 0

World Aquatics Championships appearances
- 2007; 2009; 2011; 2013; 2015; 2017; 2019; 2022; 2023; 2024; 2025

Other related appearances
- Yugoslavia (1973–1991); Serbia and Montenegro (1998–2005)

Serbia is competing at the 2013 World Aquatics Championships in Barcelona, Spain between 19 July and 4 August 2013.

== Swimming ==
Serbian swimmers achieved qualifying standards in the following events (up to a maximum of 2 swimmers in each event at the A-standard entry time, and 1 at the B-standard):

Men

Athlete	Event	Heat		Semifinal		Final	
Athlete	Event	Time	Rank	Time	Rank	Time	Rank
Bogdan Knežević	200 m individual medley	2:03.72	=37	did not advance			
Bogdan Knežević	400 m individual medley	4:29.94	33	—N/a		did not advance	
Ivan Lenđer	50 m butterfly	23.58	17	did not advance			
Ivan Lenđer	100 m butterfly	51.95	4 Q	52.10	12	did not advance	
Čaba Silađi	50 m breaststroke	27.80	=25	did not advance			
Čaba Silađi	100 m breaststroke	1:01.78	36	did not advance			
Velimir Stjepanović	200 m freestyle	1:48.12	13 Q	1:47.53	13	did not advance	
Velimir Stjepanović	400 m freestyle	3:51.90	18	—N/a		did not advance	
Velimir Stjepanović	200 m butterfly	1:57.34	15 Q	1:56.60	13	did not advance	
Boris Stojanović	50 m freestyle	22.81	31	did not advance			
Boris Stojanović	100 m freestyle	51.11	41	did not advance			

Women

Athlete	Event	Heat		Semifinal		Final	
Athlete	Event	Time	Rank	Time	Rank	Time	Rank
Andrea Basaraba	800 m freestyle	8:58.04	29	—N/a		did not advance	
Miroslava Najdanovski	50 m freestyle	25.63	23	did not advance			
Miroslava Najdanovski	100 m freestyle	56.66	37	did not advance			

== Synchronized swimming ==
Serbia has qualified the following synchronized swimmers.

Athlete	Event	Preliminaries		Final	
Athlete	Event	Points	Rank	Points	Rank
Ana Cekić	Solo free routine	72.370	27	did not advance	
Ana Cekić	Solo technical routine	71.500	26	did not advance	
Tanja Bogdanović; Ana Cekić	Duet free routine	68.550	32	did not advance	
Ana Cekić; Jovana Petrović	Duet technical routine	70.000	25	did not advance	

== Water polo ==
=== Men's tournament ===
Team roster

- Milan Aleksić
- Miloš Ćuk
- Filip Filipović
- Živko Gocić
- Dušan Mandić
- Branislav Mitrović
- Stefan Mitrović
- Slobodan Nikić
- Duško Pijetlović
- Gojko Pijetlović
- Andrija Prlainović
- Nikola Rađen
- Vanja Udovičić

Group play

	Pld	W	D	L	GF	GA	GD	Pts
Serbia	3	3	0	0	39	26	+13	6
Hungary	3	1	1	1	32	27	+5	3
Australia	3	1	1	1	25	26	−1	3
China	3	0	0	3	21	38	−17	0

22 July 2013; 13:30	Report	Serbia	10–7	Australia	Piscines Bernat Picornell, Barcelona; Attendance: 300; Referees: Borrell (ESP), Stavridis (GRE)
22 July 2013; 13:30	Report	Score by quarters: 4–3, 2–0, 1–2, 3–2			Piscines Bernat Picornell, Barcelona; Attendance: 300; Referees: Borrell (ESP), Stavridis (GRE)
22 July 2013; 13:30	Report	Udovičić, Pijetlović 3	Goals	seven players 1	Piscines Bernat Picornell, Barcelona; Attendance: 300; Referees: Borrell (ESP), Stavridis (GRE)

24 July 2013; 13:30	Report	Serbia	13–10	Hungary	Piscines Bernat Picornell, Barcelona; Attendance: 1,000; Referees: Margeta (SLO), Koryzna (POL)
24 July 2013; 13:30	Report	Score by quarters: 2–3, 5–2, 2–2, 4–3			Piscines Bernat Picornell, Barcelona; Attendance: 1,000; Referees: Margeta (SLO), Koryzna (POL)
24 July 2013; 13:30	Report	Prlainović, Nikić 3	Goals	Dé. Varga 3	Piscines Bernat Picornell, Barcelona; Attendance: 1,000; Referees: Margeta (SLO), Koryzna (POL)

26 July 2013; 09:30	Report	Serbia	16–9	China	Piscines Bernat Picornell, Barcelona; Attendance: 350; Referees: Williams (NZL), Moller (ARG)
26 July 2013; 09:30	Report	Score by quarters: 4–3, 4–2, 5–3, 3–1			Piscines Bernat Picornell, Barcelona; Attendance: 350; Referees: Williams (NZL), Moller (ARG)
26 July 2013; 09:30	Report	Mitrović 4	Goals	three players 2	Piscines Bernat Picornell, Barcelona; Attendance: 350; Referees: Williams (NZL), Moller (ARG)

Round of 16

28 July 2013; 17:30	Report	Serbia	13–5	Romania	Piscines Bernat Picornell, Barcelona; Attendance: 600; Referees: Koganov (AZE), Naumov (RUS)
28 July 2013; 17:30	Report	Score by quarters: 2–1, 5–1, 3–1, 3–2			Piscines Bernat Picornell, Barcelona; Attendance: 600; Referees: Koganov (AZE), Naumov (RUS)
28 July 2013; 17:30	Report	five players 2	Goals	Diaconu 3	Piscines Bernat Picornell, Barcelona; Attendance: 600; Referees: Koganov (AZE), Naumov (RUS)

Quarterfinal

30 July 2013; 20:15	Report	Montenegro	9–8	Serbia	Piscines Bernat Picornell, Barcelona; Attendance: 4,500; Referees: Flahive (AUS), Margeta (SLO)
30 July 2013; 20:15	Report	Score by quarters: 2–3, 4–3, 1–2, 2–0			Piscines Bernat Picornell, Barcelona; Attendance: 4,500; Referees: Flahive (AUS), Margeta (SLO)
30 July 2013; 20:15	Report	Janović 3	Goals	Mitrović 2	Piscines Bernat Picornell, Barcelona; Attendance: 4,500; Referees: Flahive (AUS), Margeta (SLO)

5th–8th place semifinal

1 August 2013; 17:00	Report	Serbia	13–14 (OT)	Spain	Piscines Bernat Picornell, Barcelona; Attendance: 1,000; Referees: Koganov (AZE), Moller (ARG)
1 August 2013; 17:00	Report	Score by quarters: 2–2, 1–0, 2–3, 1–1 OT: 2–1, 0–1 pen. 5–6			Piscines Bernat Picornell, Barcelona; Attendance: 1,000; Referees: Koganov (AZE), Moller (ARG)
1 August 2013; 17:00	Report	Pijetlović, Filipović 2	Goals	three players 3	Piscines Bernat Picornell, Barcelona; Attendance: 1,000; Referees: Koganov (AZE), Moller (ARG)

Seventh place game

3 August 2013; 15:00	Report	Australia	7–13	Serbia	Piscines Bernat Picornell, Barcelona; Attendance: 500; Referees: Peris (CRO), Moller (ARG)
3 August 2013; 15:00	Report	Score by quarters: 2–3, 2–2, 2–4, 1–4			Piscines Bernat Picornell, Barcelona; Attendance: 500; Referees: Peris (CRO), Moller (ARG)
3 August 2013; 15:00	Report	Swift, Howden 2	Goals	Filipović 5	Piscines Bernat Picornell, Barcelona; Attendance: 500; Referees: Peris (CRO), Moller (ARG)
