= Swimming at the 2024 World Aquatics Championships – Men's 4 × 100 metre freestyle relay =

Men's 4 × 100 metre freestyle relay at the 2024 World Aquatics Championships
- Venue: Aspire Dome
- Location: Doha, Qatar
- Dates: 11 February (heats and final)
- Competitors: 80 from 19 nations
- Teams: 19
- Winning time: 3:11.08

Medalists
gold medal	Pan Zhanle; Ji Xinjie; Zhang Zhanshuo; Wang Haoyu	China
silver medal	Alessandro Miressi; Lorenzo Zazzeri; Paolo Conte Bonin; Manuel Frigo; Leonardo Deplano	Italy
bronze medal	Matt King; Shaine Casas; Luke Hobson; Carson Foster; Hunter Armstrong; Jack Aikins	United States

The Men's 4 × 100 metre freestyle relay competition at the 2024 World Aquatics Championships was held on 11 February 2024.

== Records ==
Prior to the competition, the existing world and championship records were as follows.

World record	United States	3:08.24	Beijing, China	11 August 2008
Competition record	United States	3:09.06	Gwangju, South Korea	21 July 2019

== Results ==
=== Heats ===
The heats were started on 11 February at 11:43.

Rank	Heat	Lane	Nation	Swimmers	Time	Notes
1	1	4	United States	Hunter Armstrong (48.37); Jack Aikins (48.42); Luke Hobson (47.70); Carson Foster (47.83)	3:12.32	Q
2	2	4	Italy	Lorenzo Zazzeri (48.33); Paolo Conte Bonin (48.16); Leonardo Deplano (48.59); Alessandro Miressi (47.88)	3:12.96	Q
3	2	0	Great Britain	Jacob Whittle (48.82); Tom Dean (49.13); Duncan Scott (48.25); Matt Richards (47.76)	3:13.96	Q
4	2	5	China	Wang Haoyu (48.08); Ji Xinjie (48.10); Zhang Zhanshuo (49.63); Pan Zhanle (48.26)	3:14.07	Q
5	2	7	Greece	Apostolos Christou (48.92); Stergios Bilas (48.81); Kristian Gkolomeev (47.86); Andreas Vazaios (48.74)	3:14.33	Q
6	2	6	Serbia	Velimir Stjepanović (48.87); Andrej Barna (47.63); Uroš Nikolić (49.60); Nikola Aćin (48.32)	3:14.42	Q
7	1	3	Spain	Luis Domínguez (49.02); Sergio de Celis (48.11); Mario Mollà (48.28); César Castro (49.30)	3:14.71	Q
8	1	6	Hungary	Szebasztián Szabó (49.32); Dániel Mészáros (48.69); Adam Jaszo (48.43); Nandor Nemeth (48.29)	3:14.73	Q
9	1	7	Sweden	Robin Hanson (49.27); Björn Seeliger (47.97); Isak Eliasson (49.09); Marcus Holmquist (49.04)	3:15.37	
10	2	2	Poland	Kamil Sieradzki (48.91); Ksawery Masiuk (48.47); Mateusz Chowaniec (48.76); Kacper Majchrzak (49.57)	3:15.71	
11	1	5	Canada	Javier Acevedo (48.99); Finlay Knox (47.96); Antoine Sauvé (49.38); Stephen Calkins (49.41)	3:15.74	
12	2	3	South Korea	Yang Jae-hoon (49.28); Ji Yu-chan (48.90); Lee Yoo-yeon (48.69); Kim Min-suk (50.24)	3:17.11	
13	1	1	Lithuania	Tomas Navikonis (49.00); Daniil Pancerevas (49.91); Tomas Lukminas (49.10); Rokas Jazdauskas (49.40)	3:17.41	
14	1	2	Singapore	Mikkel Lee (49.64); Jonathan Tan (48.87); Ardi Azman (49.52); Darren Lim (50.49)	3:18.52	
15	2	1	Mexico	Andres Dupont (48.81); Héctor Ruvalcaba (50.62); José Ángel Martínez (50.65); Jorge Iga (50.33)	3:20.41	
16	1	0	Bulgaria	Josif Miladinov (50.43); Kaloyan Bratanov (49.42); Petar Mitsin (51.08); Yordan Yanchev (49.60)	3:20.53	NR
17	2	9	Slovakia	Tibor Tistan (50.82); Matej Duša (50.35); Richard Nagy (52.29); Frantisek Jablcnik (51.24)	3:24.70	NR
18	1	8	Thailand	Dulyawat Kaewsriyong (50.88); Navaphat Wongcharoen (52.04); Ratthawit Thammananthachote (52.29); Tonnam Kanteemool (51.38)	3:26.59	
19	2	8	Vietnam	Trần Hưng Nguyên (51.32); Nguyễn Huy Hoàng (54.04); Ngô Đình Chuyền (51.98); Nguyễn Quang Thuấn (53.03)	3:30.37	

=== Final ===
The final was started at 20:32.

Rank	Lane	Nation	Swimmers	Time	Notes
1st place, gold medalist(s)	6	China	Pan Zhanle (46.80) WR; Ji Xinjie (48.18); Zhang Zhanshuo (48.63); Wang Haoyu (47.47)	3:11.08	
2nd place, silver medalist(s)	5	Italy	Alessandro Miressi (47.90); Lorenzo Zazzeri (47.99); Paolo Conte Bonin (47.83); Manuel Frigo (48.36)	3:12.08	
3rd place, bronze medalist(s)	4	United States	Matt King (48.02); Shaine Casas (48.47); Luke Hobson (47.68); Carson Foster (48.12)	3:12.29	
4	3	Great Britain	Matt Richards (48.19); Jacob Whittle (48.36); Tom Dean (48.63); Duncan Scott (47.37)	3:12.55	
5	8	Hungary	Nandor Nemeth (47.89); Szebasztián Szabó (48.27); Dániel Mészáros (49.06); Adam Jaszo (48.44)	3:13.66	
6	2	Greece	Apostolos Christou (48.95); Kristian Gkolomeev (48.17); Stergios Bilas (48.38); Andreas Vazaios (48.17)	3:13.67	
7	7	Serbia	Velimir Stjepanović (49.10); Andrej Barna (47.75); Uroš Nikolić (48.86); Nikola Aćin (48.17)	3:13.88	
8	1	Spain	Sergio de Celis (49.03); Luis Domínguez (48.16); Carles Coll (49.40); Mario Mollà (48.34)	3:14.93	
