= Serbia at the 2011 World Aquatics Championships =

- Flag of Serbia
- FINA code: SRB
- National federation: Plivački Savez Srbije
- Website: www.serbia-swim.org.rs

in Shanghai, China
- Medals Ranked 23rd: Gold 0 Silver 1 Bronze 0 Total 1

World Aquatics Championships appearances
- 2007; 2009; 2011; 2013; 2015; 2017; 2019; 2022; 2023; 2024

Other related appearances
- Yugoslavia (1973–1991); Serbia and Montenegro (1998–2005)

Serbia competed at the 2011 World Aquatics Championships in Shanghai, China.

== Medalists ==
Medal	Name	Sport	Event	Date
Silver	Slobodan Soro; Marko Avramović; Živko Gocić; Vanja Udovičić; Miloš Ćuk; Duško Pijetlović; Slobodan Nikić; Milan Aleksić; Nikola Rađen; Filip Filipović; Andrija Prlainović; Stefan Mitrović; Gojko Pijetlović	Water Polo	Men's Tournament	30 July

== Swimming ==
There will be 8 swimmers (6 men & 2 women) that will compete at the 2011 World Aquatics Championships.

=== Men ===
Milorad Čavić, Ivan Lenđer, Radovan Siljevski, Čaba Silađi, Velimir Stjepanović, Stefan Šorak.

=== Women ===
Nađa Higl, Miroslava Najdanovski.

=== Results ===
Men

Athlete	Event	Heats		Semifinals		Final	
Athlete	Event	Time	Rank	Time	Rank	Time	Rank
Velimir Stjepanović	Men's 100m Freestyle	50.14	37	did not advance			
Velimir Stjepanović	Men's 400m Freestyle	3:54.87	26			did not advance	
Velimir Stjepanović	Men's 200m Butterfly	1:57.40	19	did not advance			
Radovan Siljevski	Men's 200m Freestyle	1:51.42	35	did not advance			
Stefan Sorak	Men's 800m Freestyle	8:14.45	36			did not advance	
Čaba Silađi	Men's 50m Breaststroke	27.93	14 Q	27.89	16	did not advance	
Čaba Silađi	Men's 100m Breaststroke	1:01.59	31	did not advance			
Milorad Čavić	Men's 50m Butterfly	23.76	12 Q	23.59	12	did not advance	
Milorad Čavić	Men's 100m Butterfly	52.67	18	did not advance			
Ivan Lenđer	Men's 50m Butterfly	23.51	5 Q	23.54	11	did not advance	
Ivan Lenđer	Men's 100m Butterfly	53.14	24	did not advance			

Women

Athlete	Event	Heats		Semifinals		Final	
Athlete	Event	Time	Rank	Time	Rank	Time	Rank
Miroslava Najdanovski	Women's 50 metre freestyle	26.09	29	did not advance			
Miroslava Najdanovski	Women's 100 metre freestyle	56.42	36	did not advance			
Nađa Higl	Women's 200 metre breaststroke	2:27.39	11 Q	2:25.56	8 Q	2:25.93	6

== Water polo ==
=== Men ===
Team Roster

- Slobodan Soro
- Marko Avramovic
- Zivko Gocic
- Vanja Udovicic – Captain
- Marko Cuk
- Dusko Pijetlovic
- Slobodan Nikic
- Milan Aleksic
- Nikola Radjen
- Filip Filipovic
- Andrija Prlainovic
- Stefan Mitrovic
- Gojko Pijetlovic

==== Group B ====
Team	Pld	W	D	L	GF	GA	GD	Pts
Serbia	3	3	0	0	41	19	+22	6
Australia	3	2	0	1	30	27	+3	4
Romania	3	1	0	2	27	31	–4	2
China	3	0	0	3	22	43	–21	0

July 18, 2011; 21:00	Report	Serbia	17–5	China	Shanghai Oriental Sports Center, Shanghai; Attendance: 400; Referees: Flahive (AUS), Reemnet (NED)
July 18, 2011; 21:00	Report	Score by quarters: 5–1, 3–0, 2–2, 7–2			Shanghai Oriental Sports Center, Shanghai; Attendance: 400; Referees: Flahive (AUS), Reemnet (NED)
July 18, 2011; 21:00	Report	Filipović 4	Goals	Five players 1	Shanghai Oriental Sports Center, Shanghai; Attendance: 400; Referees: Flahive (AUS), Reemnet (NED)

July 20, 2011; 09:30	Report	Serbia	12–5	Romania	Shanghai Oriental Sports Center, Shanghai; Attendance: 350; Referees: Stavridis (GRE), Rotsart (USA)
July 20, 2011; 09:30	Report	Score by quarters: 3–1, 3–1, 3–1, 3–2			Shanghai Oriental Sports Center, Shanghai; Attendance: 350; Referees: Stavridis (GRE), Rotsart (USA)
July 20, 2011; 09:30	Report	Prlainović 4	Goals	Radu 2	Shanghai Oriental Sports Center, Shanghai; Attendance: 350; Referees: Stavridis (GRE), Rotsart (USA)

July 22, 2011; 19:40	Report	Serbia	12–9	Australia	Shanghai Oriental Sports Center, Shanghai; Attendance: 550; Referees: Caputi (ITA), Bock (GER)
July 22, 2011; 19:40	Report	Score by quarters: 5–3, 2–1, 3–2, 2–3			Shanghai Oriental Sports Center, Shanghai; Attendance: 550; Referees: Caputi (ITA), Bock (GER)
July 22, 2011; 19:40	Report	Filipović 5	Goals	three players 2	Shanghai Oriental Sports Center, Shanghai; Attendance: 550; Referees: Caputi (ITA), Bock (GER)

==== Quarterfinals ====
July 26, 2011; 15:20	Report	Serbia	9–4	Germany	Shanghai Oriental Sports Center, Shanghai; Attendance: 500; Referees: Koganov (AZE), Alexandrescu (ROU)
July 26, 2011; 15:20	Report	Score by quarters: 2–0, 0–1, 4–3, 3–0			Shanghai Oriental Sports Center, Shanghai; Attendance: 500; Referees: Koganov (AZE), Alexandrescu (ROU)
July 26, 2011; 15:20	Report	Filipović 4	Goals	four players 1	Shanghai Oriental Sports Center, Shanghai; Attendance: 500; Referees: Koganov (AZE), Alexandrescu (ROU)

==== Semifinals ====
July 28, 2011; 16:50	Report	Hungary	14–15	Serbia	Shanghai Oriental Sports Center, Shanghai; Attendance: 1,200; Referees: Margeta (SLO), Stavridis (GRE)
July 28, 2011; 16:50	Report	Score by quarters: 2–1, 7–5, 3–3, 1–4 OT: 1–2			Shanghai Oriental Sports Center, Shanghai; Attendance: 1,200; Referees: Margeta (SLO), Stavridis (GRE)
July 28, 2011; 16:50	Report	Madaras 4	Goals	Filipović, Prlainović 3	Shanghai Oriental Sports Center, Shanghai; Attendance: 1,200; Referees: Margeta (SLO), Stavridis (GRE)

==== Gold medal game ====
July 30, 2011; 21:00	Report	Serbia	7–8	Italy	Shanghai Oriental Sports Center, Shanghai; Attendance: 2,000; Referees: Tulga (TUR), Koganov (AZE)
July 30, 2011; 21:00	Report	Score by quarters: 0–1, 2–0, 1–4, 3–1 OT: 1–2			Shanghai Oriental Sports Center, Shanghai; Attendance: 2,000; Referees: Tulga (TUR), Koganov (AZE)
July 30, 2011; 21:00	Report	Filipović 3	Goals	Aicardi 3	Shanghai Oriental Sports Center, Shanghai; Attendance: 2,000; Referees: Tulga (TUR), Koganov (AZE)

== Medal table ==
Rank	Nation	Gold	Silver	Bronze	Total
1	Serbia (SRB)	0	1	0	1
Totals (1 entries)		0	1	0	1
