= Swimming at the 2014 European Aquatics Championships – Men's 200 metre freestyle =

Men's 200 metre freestyle at the Swimming at the 2014 European Aquatics Championships
- Dates: 19–20 August
- Competitors: 60 from 27 nations
- Winning time: 1:45.78

Medalists
gold medal	Velimir Stjepanović	Serbia
silver medal	Paul Biedermann	Germany
bronze medal	Yannick Agnel	France

The Men's 200 metre freestyle competition of the 2014 European Aquatics Championships was held on 19–20 August.

== Records ==
Prior to the competition, the existing world, European and championship records were as follows.

	Name	Nation	Time	Location	Date
World record	Paul Biedermann	Germany	1:42.00	Rome	28 July 2009
European record	Paul Biedermann	Germany	1:42.00	Rome	28 July 2009
Championship record	Pieter van den Hoogenband	Netherlands	1:44.89	Berlin	2 August 2002

== Results ==
=== Heats ===
The heats were held at 09:30.

Rank	Heat	Lane	Name	Nationality	Time	Notes
1	6	4	Paul Biedermann	Germany	1:46.62	Q
2	5	6	Artem Lobuzov	Russia	1:47.51	Q
3	5	5	Sebastiaan Verschuren	Netherlands	1:47.52	Q
4	7	6	Dominik Kozma	Hungary	1:47.99	Q
5	7	5	Velimir Stjepanović	Serbia	1:48.02	Q
6	6	2	Pieter Timmers	Belgium	1:48.06	Q
7	6	3	Clemens Rapp	Germany	1:48.08	Q
8	6	5	Andrea D'Arrigo	Italy	1:48.24	Q
9	7	4	Yannick Agnel	France	1:48.27	Q
10	7	7	Robin Backhaus	Germany	1:48.28	
11	5	3	Filippo Magnini	Italy	1:48.45	Q
12	6	6	Dion Dreesens	Netherlands	1:48.59	Q
13	5	2	Yannick Lebherz	Germany	1:48.70	
14	6	9	Matias Koski	Finland	1:48.73	Q
15	6	0	Anders Lie	Denmark	1:48.83	Q
16	5	9	David Brandl	Austria	1:48.87	Q
17	7	3	Alexandr Sukhorukov	Russia	1:48.88	Q
18	7	2	Viacheslav Andrusenko	Russia	1:48.96	
19	5	1	Glenn Surgeloose	Belgium	1:49.11	Q
20	7	9	Lorys Bourelly	France	1:49.17	
21	7	0	Louis Croenen	Belgium	1:49.25	
22	7	1	Jan Świtkowski	Poland	1:49.41	
23	5	8	Tom Kremer	Israel	1:49.46	
24	6	8	Clement Mignon	France	1:49.49	
25	5	4	Nikita Lobintsev	Russia	1:49.55	
26	6	7	Ferry Weertman	Netherlands	1:49.58	
27	5	0	Miguel Durán	Spain	1:49.66	
28	3	2	Christian Scherübl	Austria	1:49.79	
29	5	7	Grégory Mallet	France	1:49.85	
30	4	7	Joost Reijns	Netherlands	1:49.89	
31	6	1	Emmanuel Vanluchene	Belgium	1:49.93	
32	7	8	Victor Martin	Spain	1:50.03	
33	4	2	Felix Auböck	Austria	1:50.18	
34	4	0	Alexi Konovalov	Israel	1:50.21	
35	4	6	Christos Katranzis	Greece	1:50.29	
35	3	4	Simonas Bilis	Lithuania	1:50.29	
35	3	3	Jean-Baptiste Febo	Switzerland	1:50.29	
38	3	1	Doğa Çelik	Turkey	1:50.60	
39	4	4	Mattias Carlsson	Sweden	1:50.82	
40	4	9	Pawel Werner	Poland	1:50.93	
41	3	5	Oscar Ekström	Sweden	1:51.10	
42	3	9	Stefan Šorak	Serbia	1:51.19	
43	2	6	David Kunčar	Czech Republic	1:51.33	
43	3	6	Martin Bau	Slovenia	1:51.33	
45	4	1	Max Litchfield	Great Britain	1:51.38	
46	4	3	David Karasek	Switzerland	1:51.41	
47	3	0	Adam Paulsson	Sweden	1:51.42	
48	4	5	Dawid Zieliński	Poland	1:51.46	
49	3	7	Alexandre Haldemann	Switzerland	1:51.60	
50	2	2	Pit Brandenburger	Luxembourg	1:52.26	
51	2	7	Anton Goncharov	Ukraine	1:52.59	
52	1	5	Sergiy Varvaruk	Ukraine	1:52.78	
53	2	3	Gustav Aberg	Sweden	1:53.02	
54	2	4	Irakli Revishvili	Georgia	1:53.04	
55	1	4	Nezir Karap	Turkey	1:53.22	
56	4	8	Tomas Havránek	Czech Republic	1:53.71	
57	2	1	Brendan Hyland	Ireland	1:53.96	
58	1	3	Davit Sikharulidze	Georgia	1:54.22	
59	2	8	Uladzimir Zhyharau	Belarus	1:54.80	
60	2	5	Julien Henx	Luxembourg	1:55.83	
—	3	8	Kemal Arda Gürdal	Turkey		DNS

=== Semifinals ===
The semifinals were held at 19:15.

==== Semifinal 1 ====
Rank	Lane	Name	Nationality	Time	Notes
1	5	Dominik Kozma	Hungary	1:46.89	Q
2	4	Artem Lobuzov	Russia	1:47.43	Q
3	3	Pieter Timmers	Belgium	1:47.76	Q
4	2	Filippo Magnini	Italy	1:47.93	Q
5	6	Andrea D'Arrigo	Italy	1:47.94	
6	7	Matias Koski	Finland	1:48.06	
7	8	Glenn Surgeloose	Belgium	1:48.97	
8	1	David Brandl	Austria	1:49.19	

==== Semifinal 2 ====
Rank	Lane	Name	Nationality	Time	Notes
1	4	Paul Biedermann	Germany	1:46.69	Q
2	3	Velimir Stjepanović	Serbia	1:46.79	Q, NR
3	5	Sebastiaan Verschuren	Netherlands	1:47.88	Q
4	2	Yannick Agnel	France	1:47.90	Q
5	6	Clemens Rapp	Germany	1:48.07	
6	8	Alexandr Sukhorukov	Russia	1:48.29	
7	7	Dion Dreesens	Netherlands	1:48.40	
8	1	Anders Lie	Denmark	1:48.94	

=== Final ===
The final was held at 18.52.

Rank	Lane	Name	Nationality	Time	Notes
1st place, gold medalist(s)	5	Velimir Stjepanović	Serbia	1:45.78	NR
2nd place, silver medalist(s)	4	Paul Biedermann	Germany	1:45.80	
3rd place, bronze medalist(s)	1	Yannick Agnel	France	1:46.65	
4	3	Dominik Kozma	Hungary	1:46.78	
5	2	Pieter Timmers	Belgium	1:47.01	
6	7	Sebastiaan Verschuren	Netherlands	1:47.16	
7	6	Artem Lobuzov	Russia	1:47.27	
8	8	Filippo Magnini	Italy	1:47.42	
