= Đorđe Lazić =

Đorđe Lazić may refer to:

- Đorđe Lazić (footballer) (born 1983), Serbian footballer
- Đorđe Lazić (water polo) (born 1996), Serbian water polo player
