= Swimming at the 2026 European Aquatics Championships – Men's 50 metre freestyle =

Men's 50 metre freestyle at the 2026 European Aquatics Championships
- Venue: Paris Aquatic Centre
- Dates: 15 August (heats and semifinals); 16 August (final)
- Competitors: 77 from 35 nations
- Winning time: 21.13

Medalists
gold medal	Nikita Sheremet	Ukraine
silver medal	Egor Kornev
silver medal	Andrej Barna	Serbia

The Men's 50 metre freestyle competition of the 2026 European Aquatics Championships was held on 15 and 16 August 2026.

== Records ==
Prior to the competition, the existing world, European and championship records were as follows.

	Name	Time	Location	Date
World record	Cameron McEvoy (AUS)	20.88	Shenzhen	20 March 2026
European record	Frederick Bousquet (FRA)	20.94	Montpellier	26 April 2009
Championship record	Ben Proud (GBR)	21.11	Glasgow	8 August 2018

== Results ==
=== Heats ===
The heats were started on 15 August at 09:30.

Qualification Rules: The 16 fastest from the heats qualify to the semifinals.

Rank	Heat	Lane	Swimmer	Nation	Time	Notes
1	6	3	Nikita Sheremet	Ukraine	21.56	Q
2	8	2	Jere Hribar	Croatia	21.62	Q
3	8	4	Egor Kornev	Neutral Athletes B	21.67	Q
4	7	6	Nikita Baez	France	21.72	Q
5	8	6	Diogo Ribeiro	Portugal	21.77	Q
6	7	1	Giovanni Guatti	Italy	21.82	Q
7	6	5	Sean Niewold	Netherlands	21.84	Q
7	7	4	Andrej Barna	Serbia	21.84	Q
9	8	3	Tom Fannon	Ireland	21.85	Q
10	6	6	Kristóf Milák	Hungary	21.87	Q
10	8	5	Vladyslav Bukhov	Ukraine	21.87	Q
12	6	4	Maxime Grousset	France	21.91	Q
13	6	0	Lorenzo Ballarati	Italy	21.95	Q
14	7	3	Meiron Cheruti	Israel	21.96	Q
15	7	2	Matej Duša	Slovakia	22.01	Q
16	7	5	Leonardo Deplano	Italy	22.04	
17	5	4	Ralf Tribuntsov	Estonia	22.07	Q
18	8	7	Martin Kartavi	Israel	22.08	
19	5	1	Vincent Van Hooydonck	Belgium	22.10	
20	5	5	Luka Cvetko	Croatia	22.11	
21	8	1	Nikola Miljenić	Croatia	22.14	
22	6	2	Rémi Fabiani	Luxembourg	22.15	
23	6	1	Elias Persson	Sweden	22.16	
24	4	4	Nikola Aćin	Serbia	22.21	
24	8	9	Stergios Bilas	Greece	22.21	
26	7	7	Vasilii Kukushkin	Neutral Athletes B	22.25	
27	4	0	Nicholas Lia	Norway	22.27	
28	8	8	Luca Hoek	Spain	22.30	
29	2	2	Nooa Matela	Finland	22.31	
30	7	0	Roman Zhidkov	Neutral Athletes B	22.33	
31	7	9	Sergio de Celis	Spain	22.37	
32	6	9	Alexander Cohoon	Great Britain	22.41	
33	3	3	Daniel Zaitsev	Estonia	22.42	
33	4	6	Manuel Frigo	Italy	22.42	
33	6	7	Jacob Mills	Great Britain	22.42	
36	5	0	Brandon van den Berg	Netherlands	22.43	
37	6	8	Jokubas Keblys	Lithuania	22.45	
38	3	0	Julian Koch	Germany	22.48	
38	8	0	Piotr Ludwiczak	Poland	22.48	
40	1	3	Oliver Sogaard-Andersen	Denmark	22.49	
41	4	8	Jakob Austevoll Harlem	Norway	22.53	
42	4	2	Patrick Dinu	Romania	22.55	
42	4	9	Frederik Riedel Lentz	Denmark	22.55	
44	5	3	Illia Linnyk	Ukraine	22.56	
45	4	3	Max Halbeisen	Austria	22.57	
46	3	1	Matthew Hamilton	Ireland	22.61	
46	3	4	Erik Falk	Sweden	22.61	
48	2	1	Ralph Daleiden Ciuferri	Luxembourg	22.62	
49	5	6	Heiko Gigler	Austria	22.69	
50	5	9	Bjørnar Grytnes Laskerud	Norway	22.71	
50	7	8	Božo Puhalović	Croatia	22.71	
52	4	5	Jānis Deivs Dzirkalis	Latvia	22.72	
53	4	1	Justin Cvetkov	Serbia	22.76	
54	1	4	Alex Ahtiainen	Estonia	22.77	
55	3	5	Elias Nordeng Refstie	Norway	22.78	
56	1	5	Velimir Stjepanović	Serbia	22.80	
57	2	4	Simon Elias Statkevičius	Iceland	22.81	
58	2	6	Ondřej Slavík	Czech Republic	22.86	
59	3	7	Balint Ashton	Switzerland	22.87	
60	4	7	Robin Yeboah	Switzerland	22.89	
61	3	2	Szymon Mróz	Poland	22.90	
62	3	8	Floris Tanis	Netherlands	23.02	
62	5	8	Mateusz Chowaniec	Poland	23.02	
64	3	6	Andrea Poladashvili	Georgia	23.03	
65	3	9	Rio Daodu	Great Britain	23.04	
66	5	7	Tajus Juška	Lithuania	23.08	
67	2	5	Merlin Belmon	Netherlands	23.10	
68	2	7	Tiago Behar	Switzerland	23.16	
69	2	8	Tom Sela	Israel	23.17	
70	2	9	Viktor Kopf	Austria	23.21	
71	1	2	Arian Kadić	Bosnia and Herzegovina	23.26	
72	1	1	Valērijs Čurgelis	Latvia	23.33	
73	2	3	Siim Keskula	Estonia	23.34	
74	1	6	Dmitrijs Tolstihs	Latvia	23.59	
75	1	7	Davin Lindholm	Finland	23.68	
76	1	8	Krasniqi Dior	Kosovo	24.95	
77	1	0	Dion Daja	Albania	25.23	
	2	0	Thierry Bollin	Switzerland	Did not start	
	5	2	Tomas Lukminas	Lithuania	Did not start	

=== Semifinals ===
The semifinals were started on 15 August at 18:54.

Qualification Rules: The fastest 8 qualified competitors from the semifinals advance to the final.

Rank	Heat	Lane	Swimmer	Nation	Time	Notes
1	2	4	Nikita Sheremet	Ukraine	21.38	Q
2	2	5	Egor Kornev	Neutral Athletes B	21.44	Q
3	1	2	Vladyslav Bukhov	Ukraine	21.51	Q
4	2	6	Andrej Barna	Serbia	21.52	Q
5	2	7	Kristóf Milák	Hungary	21.58	Q
6	2	2	Tom Fannon	Ireland	21.65	Q
7	1	3	Giovanni Guatti	Italy	21.72	Q
7	2	3	Diogo Ribeiro	Portugal	21.72	Q
9	1	7	Maxime Grousset	France	21.76	
10	1	4	Jere Hribar	Croatia	21.77	
11	1	6	Sean Niewold	Netherlands	21.78	
12	2	1	Lorenzo Ballarati	Italy	21.81	
13	1	5	Nikita Baez	France	21.85	
14	1	1	Meiron Cheruti	Israel	21.87	
15	2	8	Matej Duša	Slovakia	21.89	
16	1	8	Ralf Tribuntsov	Estonia	21.91	

=== Final ===
The final was held on 16 August at 18:30.

Rank	Lane	Name	Nationality	Time	Notes
1st place, gold medalist(s)	4	Nikita Sheremet	Ukraine	21.13	
2nd place, silver medalist(s)	5	Egor Kornev	Neutral Athletes B	21.37	
2nd place, silver medalist(s)	6	Andrej Barna	Serbia	21.37	NR
4	2	Kristóf Milák	Hungary	21.46	
5	3	Vladyslav Bukhov	Ukraine	21.58	
6	7	Tom Fannon	Ireland	21.59	
6	8	Diogo Ribeiro	Portugal	21.59	NR
8	1	Giovanni Guatti	Italy	21.83	
