= Nikita Sheremet =

Ukrainian swimmer (born 2007)

Personal information
- Nationality: Ukrainian
- Born: 11 April 2007 (age 19)
- Height: 1.94 m (6 ft 4 in)

Sport
- Sport: Swimming
- Strokes: Freestyle
- College team: University of Louisville
Medal record
Men's swimming
Representing Ukraine
Event	1st	2nd	3rd
European Championships (LC)	1	0	0
European Championships (SC)	0	1	0
World Junior Championships	1	0	0
European Junior Championships	0	1	0
Total	2	2	0
European Championships (LC)
Gold medal – first place	2026 Paris	50 m freestyle
European Championships (SC)
Silver medal – second place	2025 Lublin	50 m freestyle
World Junior Championships
Gold medal – first place	2025 Otepemi	50 m freestyle
European Junior Championships
Silver medal – second place	2025 Šamorín	50 m freestyle
European Youth Olympic Festival
Silver medal – second place	2023 Maribor	50 m freestyle

Nikita Sheremet (Ukrainian: Никита Шеремет; born 11 April 2007) is a Ukrainian swimmer. He currently competes at the collegiate level for the Louisville Cardinals.

== Early life and education ==
Sheremet was born to Antonina and Sergei Sheremet. He competes at the collegiate level for the University of Louisville.

== Career ==
In August 2025, Sheremet competed at the 2025 World Aquatics Junior Swimming Championships and won a gold medal in the 50 metre freestyle event with a time of 21.99 seconds. During the semifinals he set a world junior record time of 21.75 seconds. In December 2025, he competed at the 2025 European Short Course Swimming Championships and set a world junior and national record in the 4×50 metre freestyle relay with a time of 20.84 seconds. He then won a silver medal in the 50 metre freestyle with a new world junior and short course national record time of 20.81 seconds.

In August 2026, he competed at the 2026 European Aquatics Championships and won a gold medal in the 50 metre freestyle with a long course national record time of 21.13 seconds. This was the seventh fastest 50 metre of all-time, and missed Ben Proud's European Championships record of 21.11 by 0.02 seconds.
