= List of Serbian records in swimming =

The Serbian Records in Swimming are the fastest time ever swum by a swimmer representing Serbia. These national records are kept/maintained by the Serbian Swimming Federation (Пливачки савез Србије / Plivački savez Srbije).

The federation keeps records for both for men and women, for both long course (50m) and short course (25m) events. Records are kept in the following events (by stroke):

- freestyle: 50, 100, 200, 400, 800 and 1500;
- backstroke: 50, 100 and 200;
- breaststroke: 50, 100 and 200;
- butterfly: 50, 100 and 200;
- individual medley: 100 (25m only), 200 and 400;
- relays: 200 free, 400 free, 800 free, 200 medley, and 400 medley.

All records swum in finals, unless noted otherwise.

== Long Course (50 m) ==
=== Men ===
Event	Time		Name	Club	Date	Meet	Location	Ref
50 m freestyle	21.37		Andrej Barna	Serbia	16 August 2026	European Championships	Paris, France	
100 m freestyle	47.66		Andrej Barna	Serbia	19 June 2024	European Championships	Belgrade, Serbia	
200 m freestyle	1:45.78		Velimir Stjepanović	Serbia	20 August 2014	European Championships	Berlin, Germany	
400 m freestyle	3:45.66		Velimir Stjepanović	Serbia	18 August 2014	European Championships	Berlin, Germany	
800 m freestyle	7:53.76		Vuk Čelić	Serbia	22 June 2019	Sette Colli Trophy	Rome, Italy	
1500 m freestyle	15:11.52	h	Vuk Čelić	Serbia	4 August 2018	European Championships	Glasgow, Great Britain	
50 m backstroke	25.24	h	Nikola Aćin	Serbia	2 August 2025	World Championships	Singapore, Singapore	
100 m backstroke	53.69		Arkady Vyatchanin	New York Athletics	16 May 2015	Arena Pro Swim Series	Charlotte, United States	
200 m backstroke	1:56.31		Arkady Vyatchanin	New York Athletics	17 May 2015	Arena Pro Swim Series	Charlotte, United States	
50m breaststroke	26.83		Čaba Silađi	Hodmezovhely SUVC	30 March 2019	Hungarian Championships	Debrecen, Hungary	
100m breaststroke	59.40		Čaba Silađi	Hodmezovhely SUVC	27 March 2019	Hungarian Championships	Debrecen, Hungary	
200m breaststroke	2:15.61		Čaba Silađi	Vojvodina	6 April 2019	11 April Grand Prix	Belgrade, Serbia	
50m butterfly	22.67		Milorad Čavić	Serbia	27 July 2009	World Championships	Rome, Italy	
100m butterfly	49.95		Milorad Čavić	Serbia	1 August 2009	World Championships	Rome, Italy	
200m butterfly	1:54.99	h	Velimir Stjepanović	Serbia	30 July 2012	Olympic Games	London, United Kingdom	
200m individual medley	2:03.41		Bogdan Knežević	Etobicoke Swim Club	6 April 2013	Canadian World Championships Trials	Saanich, Canada	
400m individual medley	4:24.08	h	Strahinja Maslo	Long Island Aquatic Club	1 August 2023	Speedo Junior National Championships	Irvine, United States	
4×50m freestyle relay	1:33.82		Aleksa Bodar (23.94); Uroš Nikolić (22.50); Stefan Sorak (23.81); Čaba Silađi (23.57)	Vojvodina	1 August 2021	Serbian Summer Championships	Belgrade, Serbia	
4×100m freestyle relay	3:12.90		Velimir Stjepanović (47.99); Nikola Aćin (48.64); Justin Cvetkov (49.41); Andrej Barna (46.86)	Serbia	20 June 2024	European Championships	Belgrade, Serbia	
4×200m freestyle relay	7:15.31	h	Velimir Stjepanović (1:47.79); Aleksa Bobar (1:49.43); Vuk Čelić (1:48.79); Andrej Barna (1:49.30)	Serbia	26 July 2019	World Championships	Gwangju, South Korea	
4×50m medley relay	1:43.32		Djordje Dragojlović (26.08); Jovan Bojicić (29.02); Aleksandr Slavin (25.95); Aleksa Dobrić (22.27)	11. April	17 December 2020	Serbian Championships	Belgrade, Serbia	
4×100m medley relay	3:37.98	h	Velimir Stjepanović (55.79); Uroš Živanović (1:02.42); Đurđe Matić (51.89); Andrej Barna (47.88)	Serbia	18 February 2024	World Championships	Doha, Qatar	

Legend: # – Record awaiting ratification by Serbian Swimming Federation; WR – World record; ER – European record;
Records not set in finals: h – heat; sf – semifinal; r – relay 1st leg; rh – relay heat 1st leg; b – B final; † – en route to final mark; so – swim-off; tt – time trial

=== Women ===
Event	Time		Name	Club	Date	Meet	Location	Ref
50m freestyle	25.16	r	Nina Stanisavljević	Dubocica	20 December 2020	Serbian Championships	Belgrade, Serbia	
100m freestyle	54.73	sf	Miroslava Najdanovski	Serbia	6 July 2009	Universiade	Belgrade, Serbia	
200m freestyle	1:58.87	h	Katarina Simonović	Serbia	26 June 2016	Trofeo Sette Colli	Rome, Italy	
400m freestyle	4:12.86		Anja Crevar	Dinamo Pancevo	8 April 2018	Spanish Championships	Málaga, Spain	
800m freestyle	8:39.52		Anja Crevar	Serbia	17 March 2018	Susret Reprezentacija Bih-Hr-Slo-Srb	Belgrade, Serbia	
1500m freestyle	16:37.61		Anja Crevar	Serbia	18 March 2018	Susret Reprezentacija Bih-Hr-Slo-Srb	Belgrade, Serbia	
50m backstroke	28.54	sf	Nina Stanisavljević	Serbia	9 July 2021	European Junior Championships	Rome, Italy	
100m backstroke	1:01.67	r	Marica Stražmešter	C.N. Alcorcon	24 July 2009	Spanish Championships	Las Palmas, Spain	
200m backstroke	2:15.23	sf	Giulia Viacava	Serbia	4 July 2024	European Junior Championships	Vilnius, Lithuania	
50m breaststroke	31.77		Martina Bukvic	Serbia	26 June 2025	European U23 Championships	Šamorín, Slovakia	
100m breaststroke	1:07.80		Nađa Higl	Serbia	7 July 2009	Universiade	Belgrade, Serbia	
200m breaststroke	2:21.62		Nađa Higl	Serbia	31 July 2009	World Championships	Rome, Italy	
50m butterfly	26.87	b	Nina Stanisavljević	Georgia Tech	7 March 2025	TYR Pro Swim Series	Westmont, United States	
100m butterfly	1:00.42		Nina Stanisavljević	Novi Sad	25 July 2026	Serbian Summer Championships	Požarevac, Serbia	
200m butterfly	2:10.02		Anja Crevar	Serbia	12 August 2023	European U-23 Championships	Dublin, Ireland	
200m individual medley	2:13.91		Anja Crevar	SC Dinamo	23 March 2019	Golden Tour	Marseille, France	
400m individual medley	4:38.72		Anja Crevar	Dinamo	10 April 2019	Spanish Championships	Sabadell, Spain	
4×50m freestyle relay	1:46.09		Nina Stanisavljević (25.75); Tanja Popović (25.60); Jana Marković (26.35); Iva Obradović (28.39)	Dubocica	1 August 2021	Serbian Summer Championships	Belgrade, Serbia	
4×100m freestyle relay	3:45.42	not ratified	Tanja Popović (55.95); Jana Marković (56.39); Sara Svorcan (58.23); Nina Stanisavljević (54.85)	Serbia	10 July 2021	European Junior Championships	Rome, Italy	
4×200m freestyle relay	8:33.84		Anja Kaljević (2:05.04); Helena Lalković (2:09.51); Tea Culibrk (2:08.66); Martina Bukvić (2:10.63)	11. April	12 June 2022	Serbian Championships	Belgrade, Serbia	
4×50m medley relay	1:56.87		I. Dimkić; M Bukvić; M. Kaljević; H. Lalković	11. April	9 April 2023	-	Belgrade, Serbia	
4×100m medley relay	4:09.24		Jana Marković (1:03.32); Martina Bukvić (1:09.94); Nina Stanisavljević (1:00.60); Tanja Popović (55.38)	Serbia	11 July 2021	European Junior Championships	Rome, Italy	

=== Mixed relay ===
Event	Time		Name	Club	Date	Meet	Location	Ref
4×100m freestyle relay	3:27.60		Velimir Stjepanović (48.60); Andrej Barna (47.32); Nina Stanisavljević (56.29); Katarina Milutinović (55.39)	Serbia	21 June 2024	European Championships	Belgrade, Serbia	
4×200m freestyle relay	7:53.18		Nikola Ratkov (1:51.54); Ognjen Pilipović (1:53.34); Giulia Viacava (2:05.08); Katarina Milutinović (2:03.22)	Serbia	22 June 2024	European Championships	Belgrade, Serbia	
4×100m medley relay	3:56.46	h	Djordje Dragojlović (56.52); Uros Zivanović (1:01.89); Anja Crevar (1:01.34); Nina Stanisavljević (56.51)	Serbia	11 August 2023	European U-23 Championships	Dublin, Ireland	

Legend: # – Record awaiting ratification by Serbian Swimming Federation; WR – World record; ER – European record;
Records not set in finals: h – heat; sf – semifinal; r – relay 1st leg; rh – relay heat 1st leg; b – B final; † – en route to final mark; so – swim-off; tt – time trial

Note 1: For the women's, long-course 50 Breast record, SSF lists the record as 32.10 by Nađa Higl swum July 8, 2008 in Belgrade. 32.10 is Higl's 50 split from the 100 breast Final at the 2009 World University Games on July 7, 2008 in Belgrade; however, her 50 split from semi-finals at the meet was 32.08, which is what is listed here.

== Short Course (25 m) ==
=== Men ===
Event	Time		Name	Club	Date	Meet	Location	Ref
50m freestyle	21.49		Milorad Čavić	Serbia & Montenegro	11 December 2003	European Championships	Dublin, Ireland	
100m freestyle	47.06	h	Nikola Aćin	Serbia	11 October 2025	World Cup	Carmel, United States	
200m freestyle	1:42.48		Velimir Stjepanović	Serbia	3 December 2014	World Championships	Doha, Qatar	
400m freestyle	3:38.17		Velimir Stjepanović	Serbia	5 December 2014	World Championships	Doha, Qatar	
800m freestyle	7:46.35	†	Vuk Čelić	Serbia	4 December 2015	European Championships	Netanya, Israel	
1500m freestyle	14:36.74	h	Vuk Čelić	Serbia	3 December 2015	European Championships	Netanya, Israel	
50m backstroke	23.78	h	Nikola Acin	Serbia	6 December 2025	European Championships	Lublin, Poland	
100m backstroke	50.37		Arkady Vyatchanin	Serbia	12 December 2015	Duel in the Pool	Indianapolis, United States	
200m backstroke	1:50.87		Arkady Vyatchanin	Serbia	11 December 2015	Duel in the Pool	Indianapolis, United States	
50m breaststroke	26.31		Čaba Silađi	Serbia	12 December 2009	European Championships	Istanbul, Turkey	
100m breaststroke	57.65	h	Čaba Silađi	Serbia	10 December 2009	European Championships	Istanbul, Turkey	
200m breaststroke	2:07.85		Čaba Silađi	Tamiš	27 December 2014	Serbian Championship	Novi Sad, Serbia	
50m butterfly	22.36		Milorad Čavić	Serbia	14 December 2008	European Championships	Rijeka, Croatia	
100m butterfly	49.19		Milorad Čavić	Serbia	12 December 2008	European Championships	Rijeka, Croatia	
200m butterfly	1:51.27		Velimir Stjepanović	Serbia	14 December 2013	European Championships	Herning, Denmark	
100m individual medley	53.86		Boris Stojanović	Serbia	31 August 2014	World Cup	Dubai, United Arab Emirates	
200m individual medley	1:56.41	h	Stefan Šorak	Serbia	15 December 2017	European Championships	Copenhagen, Denmark	
400m individual medley	4:14.56		Bogdan Knežević	Serbia	10 August 2013	World Cup	Berlin, Germany	
4×50m freestyle relay	1:25.55		Sebastian Sabo (21.89); Andrej Barna (21.01); Ivan Lenđer (21.45); Uroš Nikolić (21.20)	Serbia	13 December 2017	European Championships	Copenhagen, Denmark	
4×100m freestyle relay	3:15.70		Sebastian Sabo (48.37); Stefan Šorak (48.56); Boško Radulović (49.75); Uroš Nikolić (49.02)	Vojvodina Novi Sad	4 December 2016	Serbian Championships	Novi Sad, Serbia	
4×200m freestyle relay	7:22.18		Radovan Siljevski (1:45.91); Ivan Stepanov (1:54.32); Stefan Šorak (1:47.23); Igor Terzić (1:54.72)	Vojvodina Novi Sad	16 March 2013	Serbian Championships	Zrenjanin, Serbia	
4×50m medley relay	1:35.58		Ivan Lenđer (25.40); Čaba Silađi (26.07); Radovan Siljevski (22.60); Boris Stojanović (21.51)	Serbia	12 December 2013	European Championships	Herning, Denmark	
4×100m medley relay	3:35.54		Stefan Šorak (52.87); Kristian Lakatos (1:02.52); Sebastian Sabo (51.14); Uroš Nikolić (49.01)	Vojvodina Novi Sad	3 December 2016	Serbian Championships	Novi Sad, Serbia	

Legend: # – Record awaiting ratification by Serbian Swimming Federation; WR – World record; ER – European record;
Records not set in finals: h – heat; sf – semifinal; r – relay 1st leg; rh – relay heat 1st leg; b – B final; † – en route to final mark; so – swim-off; tt – time trial

=== Women ===
Event	Time		Name	Club	Date	Meet	Location	Ref
50m freestyle	24.72	sf	Miroslava Najdanovski	Serbia	13 December 2009	European Championships	Istanbul, Turkey	
100m freestyle	53.84	sf	Miroslava Najdanovski	Serbia	10 December 2009	European Championships	Istanbul, Turkey	
200m freestyle	1:57.90		Miroslava Najdanovski	Proleter	1 March 2009	Serbian Championships	Bečej, Serbia	
400m freestyle	4:07.49	h	Anja Crevar	Serbia	19 December 2021	World Championships	Abu Dhabi, United Arab Emirates	
800m freestyle	8:39.25	h	Anja Crevar	Dinamo Pancevo	4 November 2016	Serbia Grand Prix	Zrenjanin, Serbia	
1500m freestyle	16:28.48		Anja Crevar	Dinamo	4 December 2021	Serbian Championships	Zrenjanin, Serbia	
1500m freestyle	16:23.74	h, not ratified	Anja Crevar	Serbia	23 November 2022	Solidarity Games	Kazan, Russia	
50m backstroke	27.45	=	Marica Stražmešter	Serbia	29 December 2009	Christmas International	Ordizia, Spain	
50m backstroke	27.45	h, =	Nina Stanisavljević	Serbia	19 December 2021	World Championships	Abu Dhabi, United Arab Emirates	
100m backstroke	59.40	r	Marica Stražmešter	C.N. Alcorcon	19 April 2009	Spanish Team Championships	Castellón, Spain	
200m backstroke	2:09.99		Marica Stražmešter	C.N. Alcorcon	18 April 2009	Spanish Team Championships	Castellón, Spain	
50m breaststroke	31.20	h	Martina Bukvic	Serbia	6 December 2025	European Championships	Lublin, Poland	
100m breaststroke	1:06.41	sf	Nađa Higl	Serbia	12 December 2009	European Championships	Istanbul, Turkey	
200m breaststroke	2:17.52		Nađa Higl	Serbia	11 December 2009	European Championships	Istanbul, Turkey	
50m butterfly	26.68		Nina Stanisavljević	Dubocica	12 December 2025	Serbian Championships	Novi Sad, Serbia	
100m butterfly	59.17		Milica Opačić	Vojvodina	3 November 2019	Grand Prix	Zrenjanin, Serbia	
200m butterfly	2:09.33	h	Anja Crevar	Serbia	17 December 2021	World Championships	Abu Dhabi, United Arab Emirates	
100m individual medley	1:00.53	h	Nina Stanisavljević	Serbia	6 December 2023	European Championships	Otopeni, Romania	
200m individual medley	2:11.04	sf	Anja Crevar	Serbia	5 November 2021	European Championships	Kazan, Russia	
400m individual medley	4:30.47		Anja Crevar	Serbia	2 November 2021	European Championships	Kazan, Russia	
4×50m freestyle relay	1:43.38		Isidora Dimkić (25.66); Mina Kaljević (25.56); Anja Kaljević (26.02); Tea Culibrk (26.14)	11. April	5 December 2021	Serbian Championships	Zrenjanin, Serbia	
4×100m freestyle relay	3:46.72		Martina Bukvić (57.04); Anja Kaljević (56.50); Isidora Dimkić (56.87); Mina Kaljević (56.31)	11. April	2 December 2022	Serbian Championships	Novi Sad, Serbia	
4×200m freestyle relay	8:14.49		Helena Lalković (2:02.89); Anja Kaljević (2:01.21); Mina Kaljević (2:04.66); Martina Bukvić (2:05.73)	11. April	4 December 2022	Serbian Championships	Novi Sad, Serbia	
4×50m medley relay	1:54.77		Nina Masić (30.02); Anja Kaljević (31.90); Iva Martinović (27.81); Mina Kaljević (25.04)	11. April	13 December 2025	Serbian Championships	Novi Sad, Serbia	
4×100m medley relay	4:12.67		Isidora Dimkić (1:03.40); Martina Bukvić (1:09.27); Mina Kaljević (1:03.69); Anja Kaljević (56.31)	11. April	1 December 2022	Serbian Championships	Novi Sad, Serbia	

Legend: # – Record awaiting ratification by Serbian Swimming Federation; WR – World record; ER – European record;
Records not set in finals: h – heat; sf – semifinal; r – relay 1st leg; rh – relay heat 1st leg; b – B final; † – en route to final mark; so – swim-off; tt – time trial

=== Mixed relay ===
Event	Time		Name	Club	Date	Meet	Location	Ref
4×50m freestyle relay	1:32.73		Uros Zivanović (22.41); Nikola Acin (21.15); Nina Stanisavljević (24.51); Katarina Milutinović (24.66)	Serbia	9 December 2023	European Championships	Otopeni, Romania	
4×50m medley relay	1:42.01	h	Nikola Acin (24.23); Uros Zivanović (26.60); Nina Stanisavljević (26.48); Katarina Milutinović (24.70)	Serbia	10 December 2023	European Championships	Otopeni, Romania	

Legend: # – Record awaiting ratification by Serbian Swimming Federation;
Records not set in finals: h – heat; so – swim-off

== See also ==
- Serbian records in athletics
