= Petar Jakšić =

Serbian water polo player

Personal information
- Nationality: Serbian
- Born: 20 July 2001 (age 25) Belgrade, Serbia, Yugoslavia
- Height: 193 cm (76 in)

Sport
- Sport: Water polo
- Current club: Radnički Kragujevac

Senior clubs
- Years: Team
- –: Radnički Kragujevac
Medal record
Men's water polo
Representing Serbia
Olympic Games
Gold medal – first place	2024 Paris	Team
European Championship
Gold medal – first place	2026 Belgrade

Petar Jakšić (born 20 July 2001) is a Serbian water polo player for Radnički Kragujevac. He represented Serbia at the 2024 Summer Olympics.

His older brother, Nikola, also represents the Serbia men's national water polo team. They won a gold medal for the 2024 Summer Olympics as Serbia won 13–11 against Croatia.
