= Miroslava Najdanovski =

Serbian swimmer

Personal information
- Nationality: Serbia former: Serbia and Montenegro
- Born: 10 January 1988 (age 38) Zrenjanin, SR Serbia, SFR Yugoslavia
- Height: 1.83 m (6 ft 0 in)
- Weight: 68 kg (150 lb)

Sport
- Sport: Swimming
- Club: PK Proleter Zrenjanin
Medal record
Women's swimming
Representing Serbia
Mediterranean Games
Gold medal – first place	2009 Pescara	100 m freestyle
Universiade
Bronze medal – third place	2009 Belgrade	100 m freestyle

Miroslava Najdanovski (Serbian Cyrillic: Мирослава Најдановски, born 10 January 1988 in Zrenjanin, SR Serbia, SFR Yugoslavia) is a Serbian Olympic swimmer.

== Biography ==
Najdanovski, a native of Zrejnanin, graduated from the Faculty of Sport of the University Union – Nikola Tesla, represented Serbia and Montenegro at the 2004 Summer Olympics. At only 16 years of age, she was the youngest member of the Serbo-Montenegrin delegation and also one of the youngest athletes to compete at the 2004 Summer Olympics in Athens, Greece. Najdanovski participated in one event, the Women's 50 metre freestyle, in which she took 43rd place overall among 75 competitors with a time of 27.18.

Najdanovski qualified at the 2007 World Aquatics Championships in Melbourne, Australia. She took 36th place in the Women's 100 m freestyle with a time of 57.11. She also represented Serbia at the 2008 Summer Olympics in Beijing, China. Later in 2008, thanks to a time of 26.03, Najdanovski competed at a national cup in Belgrade and qualified for the Women's 50 m freestyle as well thanks to a time. Najdanovski competed in both events as a result. She competed in the women's 50m freestyle at the 2012 Summer Olympics in London, finishing with a time of 26.46 seconds, achieving 42nd place in the heats.

On 4 November 2017, it was announced Najdanovski retired from swimming.

== Personal life ==
Najdanovski is friends with tennis player Ana Ivanovic, whom she has known through Ivanovic's relationship with Bastian Schweinsteiger. In July 2020, she was on the list of Serbian Progressive Party in the Serbian local elections for Zrejnanin.

== See also ==
- List of swimmers
- List of Serbian records in swimming
