= Nemanja Ubović =

Serbian water polo player

Personal information
- Nationality: Serbian
- Born: 24 February 1991 (age 35) Belgrade, SR Serbia, SFR Yugoslavia
- Height: 194 cm (6 ft 4 in)
Medal record
Olympic Games
Gold medal – first place	2024 Paris	Team
World Championship
Bronze medal – third place	2017 Budapest	Team

Nemanja Ubović (born 24 February 1991) is a Serbian water polo player. He represented Serbia at the 2024 Summer Olympics.
