= Vuk Čelić =

Serbian swimmer (born 1996)

Personal information
- Born: 7 November 1996 (age 29) Novi Sad, FR Yugoslavia

Sport
- Sport: Swimming

Vuk Čelić (born 7 November 1996) is a Serbian swimmer. He competed in the men's 200 metre backstroke event at the 2017 World Aquatics Championships. He qualified to represent Serbia at the 2020 Summer Olympics in the men's 800 metre freestyle event.
