= Viktor Rašović =

Serbian water polo player

Personal information
- Nationality: Serbian
- Born: 13 August 1993 (age 33) Belgrade, Serbia, FR Yugoslavia
- Height: 1.90 m (6 ft 3 in)
- Weight: 90 kg (198 lb)

Sport
- Sport: Water polo
- Current club: Radnički Kragujevac

Senior clubs
- Years: Team
- –2010: VK Beograd
- 2010–2015: Crvena zvezda
- 2015–2017: Barceloneta
- 2017–2018: Jug Dubrovnik
- 2018–2020: Szolnoki
- 2020–2021: Noisy-le-Sec
- 2021–2023: Novi Beograd
- 2023–2024: Noisy-le-Sec
- 2024–2025: Panathinaikos
- 2025–present: Radnički Kragujevac
Medal record
Men's water polo
Representing Serbia
Olympic Games
Gold medal – first place	2024 Paris	Team
World Championship
Bronze medal – third place	2017 Budapest
European Championship
Gold medal – first place	2018 Barcelona
Gold medal – first place	2026 Belgrade
FINA World League
Gold medal – first place	2016 Huizhou
Gold medal – first place	2017 Ruza
FINA World Cup
Gold medal – first place	2014 Almaty
Bronze medal – third place	2018 Berlin
Mediterranean Games
Gold medal – first place	2018 Tarragona
Universiade
Gold medal – first place	2017 Taipei	Team

Viktor Rašović (Serbian Cyrillic: Виктор Рашовић; born 13 August 1993) is a Serbian water polo centre back who plays for Radnički Kragujevac. He also represents the Serbia men's national water polo team.

== Honours ==
=== Club ===
VK Crvena zvezda

- National Championship of Serbia: 2012–13, 2013–14
- National Cup of Serbia: 2012–13, 2013–14
- 2012–13 LEN Champions League
- 2013 LEN Super Cup

CN Atlètic-Barceloneta

- 2015–16 División de Honor de Waterpolo

VK Jug

- National Championship of Croatia: 2017-18
- National Cup of Croatia: 2017-18
- Adriatic Water Polo League: 2017-18

Szolnok

- National Championship of Hungary: 2020–21
- 2020–21 LEN Eurocup

== See also ==
- List of World Aquatics Championships medalists in water polo
