= Stefan Šorak =

Serbian swimmer

Personal information
- Born: 26 March 1992 (age 34)

Sport
- Sport: Swimming

Stefan Šorak (born 26 March 1992) is a Serbian swimmer. He competed in the men's 200 metre individual medley event at the 2017 World Aquatics Championships.
