= Sava Ranđelović =

Serbian water polo player

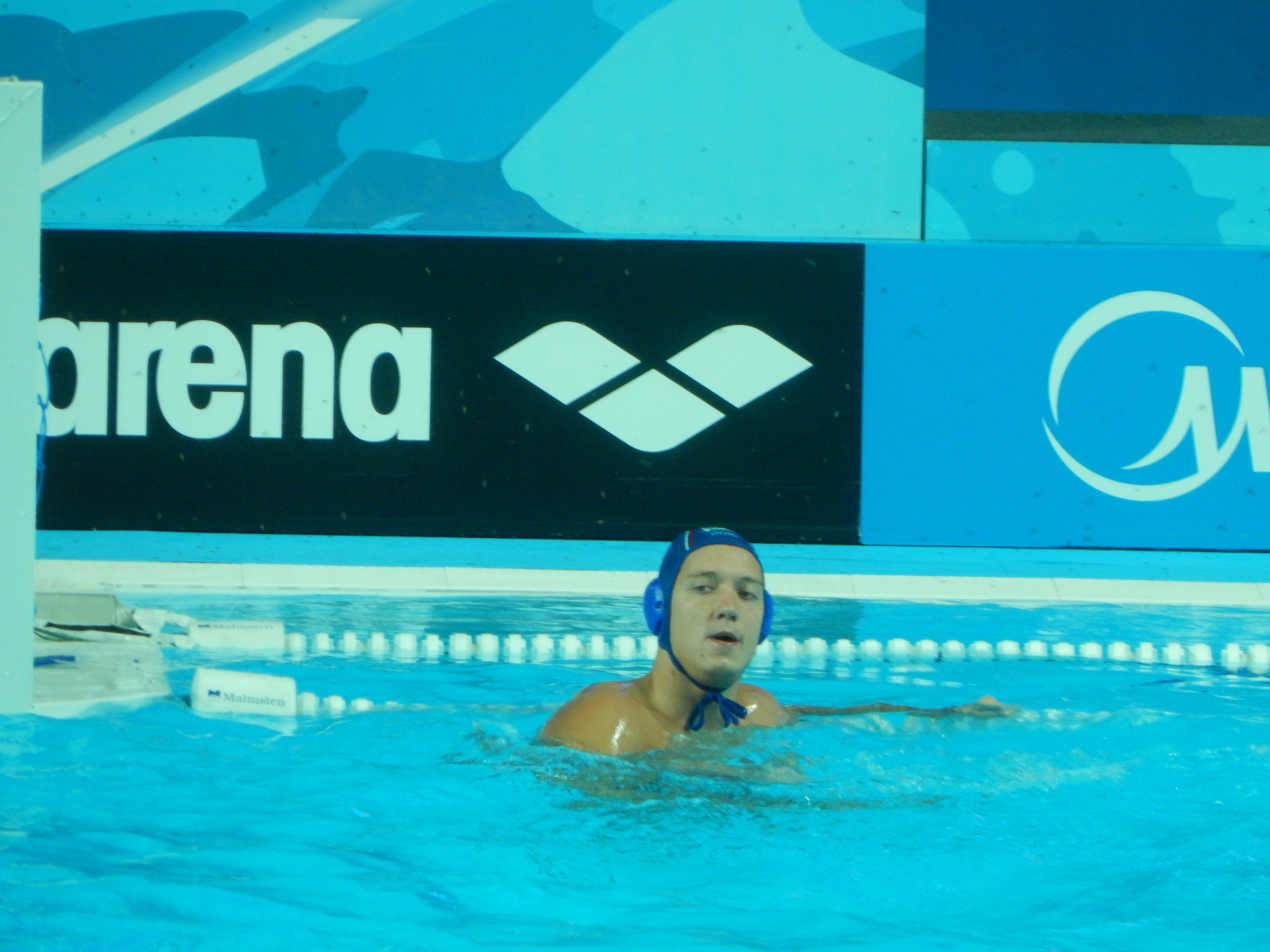
- Ranđelović at the 2015 World Championships final in Kazan in August 2015

Personal information
- Nationality: Serbian
- Born: 17 July 1993 (age 33) Niš, Serbia, FR Yugoslavia
- Height: 1.93 m (6 ft 4 in)
- Weight: 98 kg (216 lb)

Sport
- Sport: Water polo
- Current club: Radnički Kragujevac

Senior clubs
- Years: Team
- 2000–2010: VK Niš
- 2010–2011: VK ŽAK
- 2011–2015: Crvena zvezda
- 2015–2017: Brescia
- 2017–2020: OSC Budapest
- 2020–?: VasasPlaket
- ?–present: Radnički Kragujevac
Medal record
Men's water polo
Representing Serbia
Olympic Games
| Gold medal – first place | 2016 Rio de Janeiro | Team |
| Gold medal – first place | 2020 Tokyo | Team |
| Gold medal – first place | 2024 Paris | Team |
World Championship
| Bronze medal – third place | 2017 Budapest | Team |
European Championship
| Gold medal – first place | 2014 Budapest |
| Gold medal – first place | 2016 Belgrade |
| Gold medal – first place | 2018 Barcelona |
| Gold medal – first place | 2026 Belgrade |
World League
| Gold medal – first place | 2014 Dubai |
| Gold medal – first place | 2015 Bergamo |
| Gold medal – first place | 2016 Huizhou |
| Gold medal – first place | 2017 Ruza |
| Gold medal – first place | 2019 Belgrade |
World Cup
| Gold medal – first place | 2014 Almaty |
| Bronze medal – third place | 2018 Berlin |
Mediterranean Games
| Gold medal – first place | 2018 Tarragona |
Universiade
| Gold medal – first place | 2017 Taipei | Team |

Sava Ranđelović (Serbian Cyrillic: Сава Ранђеловић; born 17 July 1993) is a Serbian water polo player for Radnički Kragujevac and the Serbia men's national water polo team.

Representing Serbia, he won European Championship gold medals in 2014, 2016, and 2018. He also won a gold medal at the World Championships in 2015, and Olympic gold medals in 2016 and 2020.

== See also ==
- Serbia men's Olympic water polo team records and statistics
- List of Olympic champions in men's water polo
- List of Olympic medalists in water polo (men)
- List of world champions in men's water polo
- List of World Aquatics Championships medalists in water polo
