= Đorđe Lazić (water polo) =

Serbian water polo player

Personal information
- Nationality: Serbian
- Born: 19 May 1996 (age 30) Belgrade, FR Yugoslavia

Sport
- Sport: Water polo
- Current club: Jadran Herceg Novi

Senior clubs
- Years: Team
- 2014–2018: Partizan
- 2018–2020: Szolnoki Vízilabda
- 2020–?: Brescia
- ?–present: Jadran Herceg Novi
Medal record
Men's water polo
Representing Serbia
Olympic Games
Gold medal – first place	2020 Tokyo	Team
European Championship
Gold medal – first place	2026 Belgrade
Summer Universiade
Gold medal – first place	2017 Taipei	Team

Đorđe Lazić (Serbian Cyrillic: Ђорђе Лазић; born 19 May 1996) is a Serbian water polo player who plays for Jadran Herceg Novi. He was a member of the Serbia men's national water polo team that won a gold medal at the 2020 Summer Olympics.
