= Nikola Jakšić =

Serbian water polo player

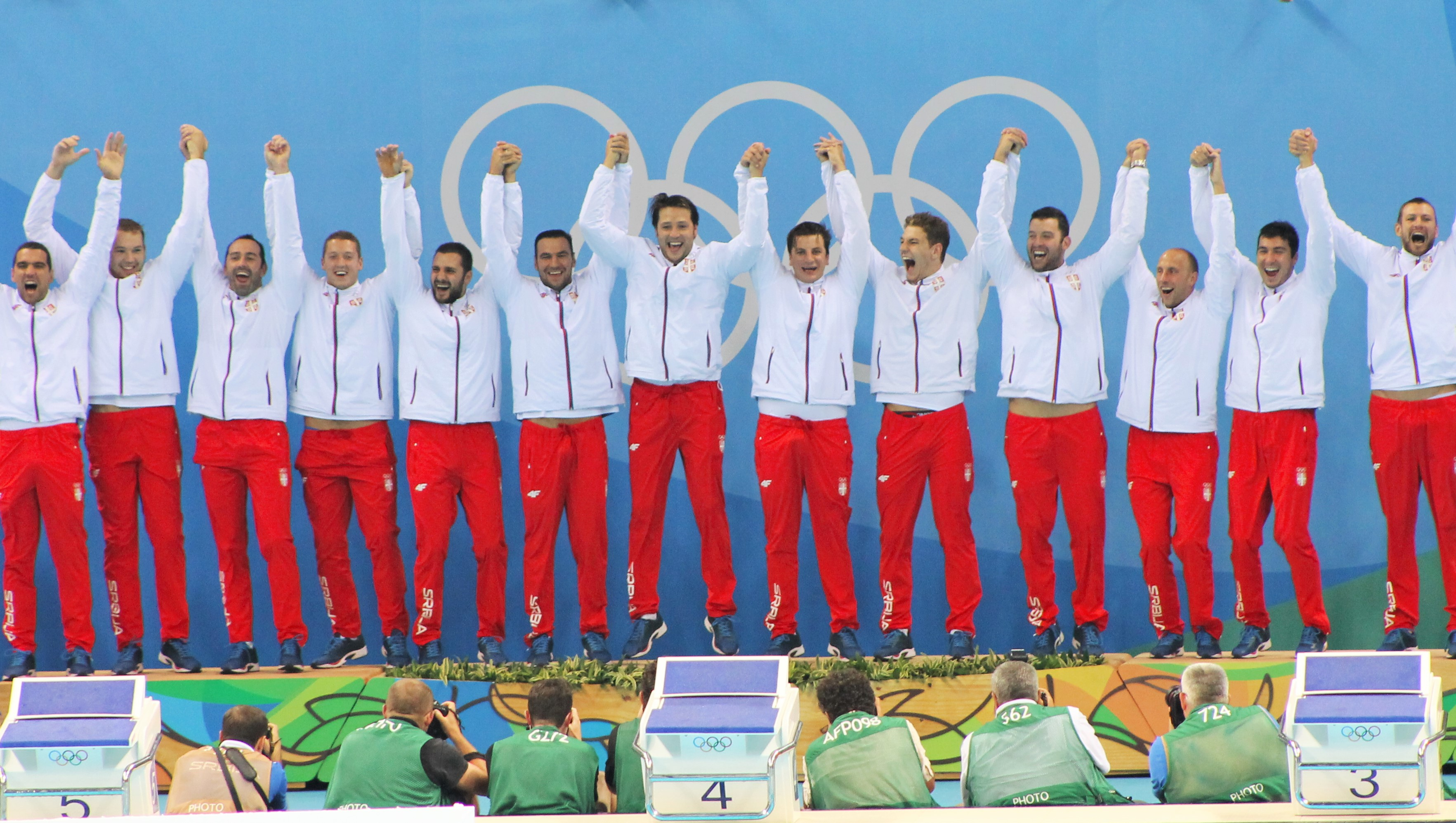

Personal information
- Nationality: Serbian
- Born: 17 January 1997 (age 29) Belgrade, Serbia, FR Yugoslavia
- Height: 1.97 m (6 ft 6 in)
- Weight: 105 kg (231 lb)

Sport
- Sport: Water polo
- Position: Centre-back
- Current club: Radnički Kragujevac

Senior clubs
- Years: Team
- 2013–2017: Partizan
- 2017–2021: Ferencvárosi
- 2021–2024: Novi Beograd
- 2024–present: Radnički Kragujevac
Medal record
Men's water polo
Representing Serbia
Olympic Games
Gold medal – first place	2016 Rio de Janeiro	Team
Gold medal – first place	2020 Tokyo	Team
Gold medal – first place	2024 Paris	Team
World Championship
Gold medal – first place	2015 Kazan	Team
Bronze medal – third place	2017 Budapest	Team
European Championships
Gold medal – first place	2016 Belgrade
Gold medal – first place	2018 Barcelona
Gold medal – first place	2026 Belgrade
World League
Gold medal – first place	2015 Bergamo
Gold medal – first place	2019 Belgrade
World Cup
Bronze medal – third place	2018 Berlin
Mediterranean Games
Gold medal – first place	2018 Tarragona
Summer Universiade
Gold medal – first place	2017 Taipei	Team

Nikola Jakšić (Serbian: Никола Јакшић; born 17 January 1997) is a Serbian water polo player who plays for Radnički Kragujevac. At the 2016 Summer Olympics, he competed for the Serbia men's national water polo team in the men's event.

His younger brother, Petar, also represents the Serbia men's national water polo team. They won a gold medal for the 2024 Summer Olympics as Serbia won 13–11 against Croatia.

== Honours ==
=== Club ===
VK Partizan

- Serbian Championship: 2014–15, 2015–16, 2016–17
- Serbian Cup: 2015–16, 2016–17

Ferencváros

- LEN Champions League: 2018–19; runner-up: 2020–21
- LEN Euro Cup: 2017–18
- LEN Super Cup: 2018, 2019
- Hungarian Championship: 2017–18, 2018–19
- Hungarian Cup: 2017–18, 2018–19, 2019–20, 2020–21
- Hungarian Super Cup: 2018

VK Novi Beograd

- LEN Champions League runners-up: 2021–22, 2022–23
- Adriatic League: 2021–22, 2023–24
- Serbian Championship: 2021–22, 2022–23
- Serbian Cup: 2023–24

== Awards ==
- Member of the World Teamby totalwaterpolo: 2021, 2023, 2024
- Sportsman of the Year of the JSD Partizan: 2015, 2016
- Young Athlete of The Year by the Serbian Olympic Committee: 2016
- Serbian Championship Defender of the Year: 2014–15, 2015–16, 2016–17, 2021–22, 2022–23
- Hungarian Championship Defender of the Year: 2017–18, 2018–19, 2020–21
- Adriatic League Defender of the Year: 2021–22
- LEN Champions League Defender of the Year: 2020–21

== See also ==
- Serbia men's Olympic water polo team records and statistics
- List of Olympic champions in men's water polo
- List of Olympic medalists in water polo (men)
- List of world champions in men's water polo
- List of World Aquatics Championships medalists in water polo
