= Andrej Barna =

Serbian swimmer (born 1998)

Personal information
- Born: 6 March 1998 (age 28) Subotica, Serbia, FR Yugoslavia
- Height: 1.86 m (6 ft 1 in)

Sport
- Sport: Swimming
- College team: University of Louisville
Medal record
Men's swimming
Representing Serbia
European Championships (LC)
Gold medal – first place	2024 Belgrade	4×100 m freestyle
Silver medal – second place	2026 Paris	50 m freestyle
Bronze medal – third place	2024 Belgrade	100 m freestyle
Mediterranean Games
Gold medal – first place	2018 Tarragona	4×100 m freestyle

Andrej Barna (Serbian Cyrillic: Андреј Барна; born 6 March 1998) is a Serbian swimmer. He represented Serbia at the 2019 World Aquatics Championships held in Gwangju, South Korea and he finished in 44th place in the heats in the men's 50 metre freestyle event. He also competed in the men's 4 × 200 metre freestyle relay event.

In 2018, he won the gold medal in the men's 4 × 100 metre freestyle relay event at the Mediterranean Games in Tarragona, Spain.

In June 2024, he won the bronze medal in 100m freestyle at the 2024 European Aquatics Championships, with time 47.66.

In 2019, Barna faced serious health problems when he was diagnosed with kidney cancer. However, his fight against illness and return to top form showed his extraordinary mental strength and dedication to the sport.

== Personal best times ==
=== Long course metres (50 m pool) ===
Event	Time	Meet	Location	Date	Notes	Ref
50 m freestyle	21.37	2026 European Aquatics Championships	Paris, France	16 August 2026	NR	
100 m freestyle	47.66	2024 European Aquatics Championships	Belgrade, Serbia	19 June 2024	NR	

Legend: NR – Serbian record;
Records not set in finals: h – heat; sf – semifinal; r – relay 1st leg; rh – relay heat 1st leg; b – B final; † – en route to final mark; so – swim-off; tt – time trial
