= Dušan Mandić =

Serbian water polo player

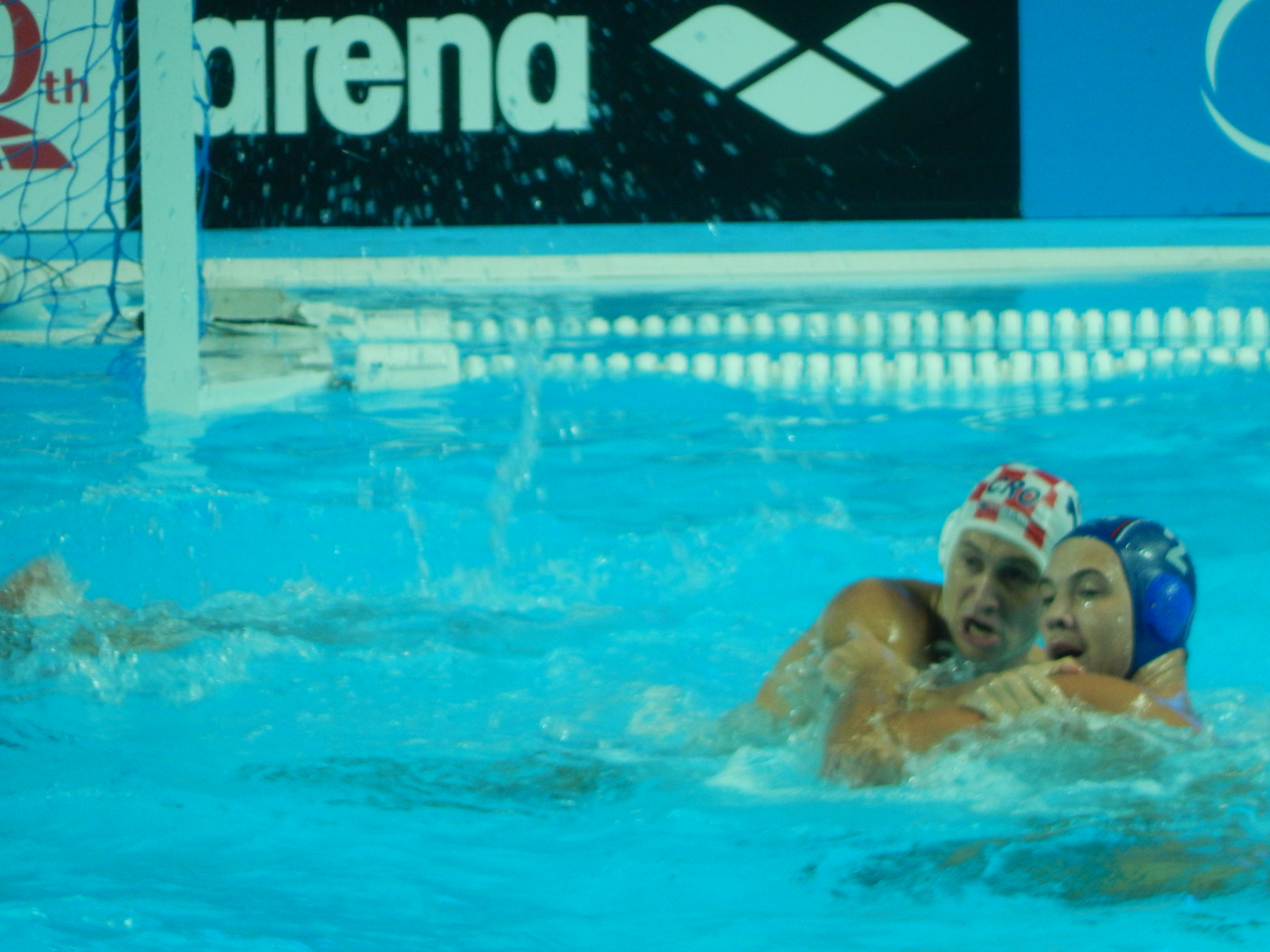
- Mandić in 2015

Personal information
- Nationality: Serbian
- Born: 16 June 1994 (age 32) Kotor, Montenegro, FR Yugoslavia
- Height: 2.02 m (6 ft 8 in)
- Weight: 105 kg (231 lb)

Sport
- Sport: Water polo
- Position: Right Wing/ Right Drive
- Current club: Ferencváros

Senior clubs
- Years: Team
- 2009–2010: Primorac Kotor
- 2010–2015: Partizan
- 2015–2021: Pro Recco
- 2021–2023: Novi Beograd
- 2023–present: Ferencváros
Medal record
Men's water polo
Representing Serbia
Olympic Games
| Gold medal – first place | 2016 Rio de Janeiro | Team |
| Gold medal – first place | 2020 Tokyo | Team |
| Gold medal – first place | 2024 Paris | Team |
| Bronze medal – third place | 2012 London | Team |
World Championship
| Gold medal – first place | 2015 Kazan | Team |
| Bronze medal – third place | 2017 Budapest | Team |
European Championships
| Gold medal – first place | 2014 Budapest |
| Gold medal – first place | 2016 Belgrade |
| Gold medal – first place | 2018 Barcelona |
| Gold medal – first place | 2026 Belgrade |
FINA World League
| Gold medal – first place | 2013 Chelyabinsk |
| Gold medal – first place | 2014 Dubai |
| Gold medal – first place | 2015 Bergamo |
| Gold medal – first place | 2019 Belgrade |
FINA World Cup
| Gold medal – first place | 2014 Almaty |
| Bronze medal – third place | 2018 Berlin |
Mediterranean Games
| Gold medal – first place | 2018 Tarragona |
Junior World Championship
| Bronze medal – third place | 2012 Perth |
Representing Montenegro
Youth World Championship
| Gold medal – first place | 2011 Volos |

Dušan Mandić (Serbian Cyrillic: Душан Мандић; born 16 June 1994) is a Serbian water polo player who plays for Ferencváros.

He was a part of the Montenegrin junior water polo team before opting to play for Serbia. With Serbian junior national team he won a gold medal at the 2011 Junior Water Polo World Championship. At the 2012 Summer Olympics, he competed for the Serbia men's national water polo team in the men's event, winning bronze.

He has won one bronze and three gold medals for Serbia at the Olympics, the most recent one coming in Paris in 2024. He was also named MVP of the tournament in Paris as well. Mandić is widely considered as one of the best water polo players worldwide.

== Honours ==
=== Club ===
Primorac Kotor

- LEN Champions League runners-up: 2009–10
- Montenegrin Cup: 2009–10

Partizan

- Serbian Championship: 2010–11, 2011–12, 2014–15
- Serbian Cup: 2010–11, 2011–12
- Eurointer League: 2011
- LEN Champions League: 2010–11
- LEN Super Cup: 2012

Pro Recco

- LEN Champions League: 2020–21; runners-up: 2017–18
- Serie A: 2015–16, 2016–17, 2017–18, 2018–19
- Coppa Italia: 2015–16, 2016–17, 2017–18, 2018–19, 2020–21

Novi Beograd

- LEN Champions League runners-up: 2021–22, 2022–23
- Adriatic League: 2021–22
- Serbian Championship: 2021–22, 2022–23

Ferencváros

- LEN Champions League: 2023–24, 2024–25
- Hungarian Championship: 2023–24
- Hungarian Cup: 2023–24

=== Individual ===
- World Aquatics Best Male Water Polo Player: 2020, 2024
- Swimming World Magazine's man water polo ''World Player of the Year " award: 2020
- Total-waterpolo magazine's man water polo "World Player of the Year" award: 2021, 2024
- Member of the World Team by total-waterpolo: 2018, 2021, 2024
- Summer Olympics MVP: 2024
- Summer Olympics Top Scorer: 2024
- Summer Olympics Best Right Drive of the Tournament: 2024
- LEN Champions League MVP: 2020–21, 2023–24
- LEN Champions League Final Four MVP: 2024
- LEN Champions League Final Eight MVP: 2021
- LEN Champions League Right Driver of the Year: 2017–18, 2020–21, 2021–22
- LEN Champions League Right Winger of the Year: 2023–24, 2024–25
- World Championship Team of the Tournament: 2019, 2025
- World League MVP: 2015 Bergamo
- Serie A MVP (2): 2016–17, 2020–21
- Serie A Right Driver of the Year (5): 2015–16, 2016–17, 2017–18, 2018–19, 2020–21
- Serbian Championship MVP (2): 2014–15, 2021–22
- Serbian Championship Top Scorer: 2014–15
- Serbian Championship Right Wing of the Year (7): 2010–11, 2011–12, 2012–13, 2013–14, 2014–15, 2021–22, 2022–23
- Serbian Championship Young Player of the Year (4): 2010–11, 2011–12, 2012–13, 2013–14
- "Young Athlete of the Year" by Olympic Committee of Serbia: 2012
- Serbian Water Polo Player of the Year: 2017
- 2026 Men's European Championship All Star team.
- 2026 Men's European Championship finals MVP.

== See also ==
- Serbia men's Olympic water polo team records and statistics
- List of Olympic champions in men's water polo
- List of Olympic medalists in water polo (men)
- Summer Olympics national flag bearers
- List of world champions in men's water polo
- List of World Aquatics Championships medalists in water polo

Olympic Games
| Preceded by Filip Filipović (with Sonja Vasić) | Flagbearer for Serbia (with Maja Ognjenović); Paris 2024 | Succeeded by Incumbent |
