= Uroš Nikolić (swimmer) =

Serbian swimmer (born 1996)

Personal information
- Nationality: Serbian
- Born: 20 July 1996 (age 29) Jagodina, FR Yugoslavia

Sport
- Sport: Swimming
Medal record
Men's swimming
Representing Serbia
Mediterranean Games
Gold medal – first place	2018 Tarragona	4×100 m freestyle
Silver medal – second place	2018 Tarragona	4×200 m freestyle

Uroš Nikolić (born 20 July 1996) is a Serbian swimmer. He competed in the men's 4 × 100 metre freestyle relay at the 2020 Summer Olympics and the same event at the 2024 Summer Olympics.

In July 2024 Nikolić was issued with a one year competition ban for anti-doping rule violation in relation to unintential use of ephedrine after testing positive at the 2024 World Aquatics Championships held in Doha. All of his results, including relays, were disqualified from 11 February 2024 onwards.
