= Velimir Stjepanović =

Serbian swimmer

Personal information
- Nickname: Velja
- Nationality: Serbian
- Born: August 7, 1993 (age 33) Abu Dhabi, UAE
- Height: 1.82 m (6 ft 0 in)
- Weight: 75 kg (165 lb)

Sport
- Sport: Swimming
- Strokes: butterfly, freestyle
- Club: DC Trident; Partizan
Medal record
World Championships (SC)
Bronze medal – third place	2014 Doha	400 m freestyle
European Championships (LC)
Gold medal – first place	2014 Berlin	200 m freestyle
Gold medal – first place	2014 Berlin	400 m freestyle
Gold medal – first place	2024 Belgrade	4×100 m freestyle relay
Silver medal – second place	2016 London	200 m freestyle
European Championships (SC)
Gold medal – first place	2013 Herning	200 m butterfly
Bronze medal – third place	2013 Herning	400 m freestyle
Mediterranean Games
Gold medal – first place	2013 Mersin	200 m freestyle
Gold medal – first place	2013 Mersin	400 m freestyle
Gold medal – first place	2013 Mersin	200 m butterfly
Gold medal – first place	2018 Tarragona	200 m freestyle
Gold medal – first place	2018 Tarragona	200 m butterfly
Gold medal – first place	2018 Tarragona	4×100 m freestyle
Silver medal – second place	2018 Tarragona	4×200 m freestyle
Silver medal – second place	2018 Tarragona	4×100 m medley
Youth Olympic Games
Silver medal – second place	2010 Singapore	100 m freestyle
Bronze medal – third place	2010 Singapore	100 m butterfly
European Junior Championships
Gold medal – first place	2011 Belgrade	100 m freestyle
Gold medal – first place	2011 Belgrade	100 m butterfly
European Youth Olympic Festival
Gold medal – first place	2009 Tampere	100 m butterfly
Silver medal – second place	2009 Tampere	100 m freestyle

Velimir Stjepanović (Serbian Cyrillic: Велимир Стјепановић; born 7 August 1993) is a Serbian professional swimmer currently representing DC Trident at the International Swimming League. He has won gold medals at the European Championships, European Short Course Championships and Mediterranean Games.

== Youth and Junior Career ==
Born in Abu Dhabi, to Bosnian Serb parents, he chose to represent Serbia in the international swimming competitions. The Serbian youngster started swimming when he was barely six, mainly for fitness. However, by the time he was 12 his path crossed with that of coach Chris Tidey, who had relocated to Dubai from Cambridge. After a brief six-month training regimen under Tidey, Stjepanović won his first medal, a bronze, at a competition in England. He also studied in one of GEMS schools.

Velimir competed at the 2009 European Youth Olympic Festival. He won a gold medal in 100m butterfly and silver in 100m Freestyle. At the 2010 Youth Olympic Games, he was a Serbian flagbearer and won 2 medals, silver in 100m Freestley and bronze in 100m butterfly therefore Olympic Committee of Serbia has declared him the best young athlete in 2010. Stjepanović won gold medals in the 100m freestyle and 100m butterfly at the 2011 European Junior Swimming Championships.

== Senior career ==
=== 2011 ===
He represented Serbia at the 2011 World Aquatics Championships in Shanghai, where he competed in 100 and 400n freestyle and 200m butterfly. At the European Short Course Swimming Championships held in Szczecin he came 5th in final of 200m butterfly.

=== 2012 ===
Stjepanović competed at the 2012 European Aquatics Championships and took 5th place in Men's 200m butterfly Final. At the 2012 Summer Olympics in London, he finished 6th of Men's 200m butterfly Final. In the preliminary round he broke the Serbian national record and qualified for the semi-finals with the 3rd time overall.

=== 2013 ===
At the 2013 Mediterranean Games held in Mersin, Turkey he won the gold medal in 200m and 400m freestyle and 200m butterfly. Stjepanović competed at the 2013 World Aquatics Championships and qualified for the semi-final of 200m freestyle and 200m butterfly while he finished 18th in the 400m freestyle. At the end of the year, Stjepanović won gold medal in 200m butterfly, bronze in 400m freestyle and finished 5th in 200m freestyle at the 2013 European Short Course Swimming Championships.

=== 2014 World Championships (25m) ===
At the 2014 FINA Short Course World Championships in Doha, Stjepanovic won a bronze medal in the 400m freestyle

== 2024 ==
As a member of the Serbian 4×100m freestyle relay team, he won a gold medal at the 2024 European Championships.

=== International Swimming League ===
Stjepanovic was a member of the inaugural International Swimming League (ISL) representing DC Trident. He competed at the first two matches held in Indianapolis, Indiana, and Naples, Italy, as well as in the American Derby held in College Park, Maryland.

== Career best times ==
Event	Time	Record	Meet
Long course
100 m freestyle	47.99		2024 European Championships
200 m freestyle	1:45.78	NR	2014 European Championships
400 m freestyle	3:45.66	NR	2014 European Championships
200m butterfly	1:54.99	NR	2012 Olympic Games

== See also ==
- List of Serbian records in swimming
