= Aleksandar Ivović =

Montenegrin water polo player

Personal information
- Nationality: Montenegrin
- Born: 24 February 1986 (age 40) Herceg Novi, SR Montenegro, SFR Yugoslavia
- Height: 1.98 m (6 ft 6 in)

Sport
- Sport: Water polo
- Handedness: Right
- Position: Centre-back
- Current club: Pro Recco
- Number: 9

Senior clubs
- Years: Team
- 2003—2010: PVK Jadran
- 2010—2012: Pro Recco
- 2012—2013: VK Jug
- 2013—present: Pro Recco
Medal record
Men's water polo
Representing Serbia and Montenegro
Mediterranean Games
Bronze medal – third place	2005 Almería	Team
Universiade
Gold medal – first place	2005 İzmir	Team
European Junior Championship
Gold medal – first place	2004 Valletta
Representing Montenegro
World Championships
Silver medal – second place	2013 Barcelona	Team
European Championship
Gold medal – first place	2008 Málaga
Silver medal – second place	2012 Eindhoven
Silver medal – second place	2016 Belgrade
Bronze medal – third place	2020 Budapest
FINA World League
Gold medal – first place	2020 Tbilisi
Gold medal – first place	2018 Budapest
Gold medal – first place	2009 Podgorica
Silver medal – second place	2010 Niš
Bronze medal – third place	2013 Chelyabinsk
Bronze medal – third place	2014 Dubai
Mediterranean Games
Bronze medal – third place	2018 Tarragona

Aleksandar Ivović (born 24 February 1986) is a Montenegrin professional water polo player. He started his career at PVK Jadran, which is his first senior team to compete for. He was a member of the Montenegro men's national water polo team at the 2008 Summer Olympics. The team reached the semifinals, where they were defeated by Hungary and then lost to Serbia in the bronze medal match. At the 2012 Summer Olympics, he was again a member of Montenegro's team, where they lost to Croatia in the semi-final, and then lost to Serbia again in the bronze medal match, this time 11–12. He is considered one of the best defenders of all time and by many the top in his position in the world as he can transform the entire defense of his team.

== Honours ==
=== Club ===
PVK Jadran

- Adriatic League: 2009–10
- Championship of Serbia & Montenegro: 2002–03, 2003–04, 2004–05, 2005–06, 2008–09
- Montenegrin Cup: 2006–07, 2007–08

Jug Dubrovnik

- Croatian Championship: 2012–13
- LEN Champions League; runners-up : 2012–13

Pro Recco

- LEN Champions League: 2011–12, 2014–15, 2020–21, 2021–22, 2022–23; runners-up: 2010–11, 2017–18
- LEN Super Cup: 2012, 2015, 2021, 2022
- Adriatic League: 2011 –12
- Serie A1: 2010–11, 2011–12, 2013–14, 2014–15, 2015–16, 2016–17, 2017–18, 2018–19, 2021–22, 2022–23
- Coppa Italia: 2010–11, 2013–14, 2014–15, 2015–16, 2016–17, 2017–18, 2018–19, 2020–21, 2021–22, 2022–23

== Awards ==
- Swimming World Magazine's man water polo "World Player of the Year" award: 2011, 2018
- LEN Champions League Defender of the Year: 2016–17, 2021–22
- Member of the Second World Team of the 2000–2020 by total-waterpolo
- Member of the World Team by total-waterpolo 2018, 2019
- Montenegrin Olympic Committee "Athlete of the Year": 2015, 2016
- MVP of the 2008–09 Adriatic League with PVK Jadran
- Top Scorer of the 2008–09 Adriatic League: 103 goals with PVK Jadran
- MVP of the 2009–10 Adriatic League with PVK Jadran
- Top Scorer of the 2009–10 Adriatic League: 68 goals with PVK Jadran
- Top Scorer of the 2010–11 Serie A1: 79 goals with Pro Recco
- Top Scorer of the 2012–13 Adriatic League: 66 goals with Jug Dubrovnik
- 2012 Olympic Games Team of the Tournament
- 2020 Olympic Games Team of the Tournament
- Top Scorer of the 2020 Olympic Games: 24 goals
- Top Scorer of the 2018 World League: 14 goals
- Top Scorer of the 2018 European Championship: 17 goals
- Top Scorer of the 2013 World Championship: 20 goals
- Top Scorer of the 2019 World Championship: 21 goals
- 2013 World Championship Team of the Tournament
- 2019 World Championship Team of the Tournament
- World League MVP: 2020 Tbilisi

== See also ==
- Montenegro men's Olympic water polo team records and statistics
- List of men's Olympic water polo tournament top goalscorers
- List of World Aquatics Championships medalists in water polo

Awards
Preceded by Katarina Bulatović and Mlađan Janović	Montenegrin Sportsperson of the Year; 2015; 2016 (with Marina Raković)	Succeeded by Vuko Borozan
Preceded by (Hungary) Márton Vámos	Swimming World Magazine; Water Polo Player of the Year; 2018	Succeeded by (Italy) Francesco Di Fulvio
