= 2014 FINA Men's Water Polo World Cup =

- League: FINA Water Polo World Cup
- Sport: Water polo
- Duration: 19 – 24 August

Super Final
- Finals champions: Serbia
- Runners-up: Hungary

FINA Water Polo World Cup seasons
- ← 2010 2018 →

The 15th edition of the Men's FINA Water Polo World Cup was held in Almaty, Kazakhstan from August 19 to August 24, 2014.

== Format ==
8 teams qualified for the 2014 FINA World Cup. They were split into two groups of 4 teams. After playing a Round-robin every team advanced to the quarterfinals. The best ranked team of Group A played against the fourth ranked team of Group B, the second ranked team of Group A against the third ranked team of Group B the third ranked team of Group A against the second ranked team of Group B and the fourth ranked team of Group A against the best ranked team of Group B. The winners of those quarterfinals advanced to the Semis and played out the champion while the losers of the quarterfinals competed in placement matches.

== Teams ==
The top three teams from the previous world championship qualify, with one guest per continent (the highest-ranked team from the previous world championship). Despite finishing 7th at 2013 World Championship, Serbia received an invitation from FINA as defending European champion instead of Italia ranked 4th at 2013 World Championship

| Teams | Qualified as |
|---|---|
| Kazakhstan; Hungary; Montenegro; Croatia (Italy); United States; Australia (Asian Host); South Africa; Serbia | Host (12th 2013 World Championship); 1st 2013 World Championship; 2nd 2013 World Championship; 3rd 2013 World Championship; 1st European team at 2013 World Championship; 1st American team at 2013 World Championship; 1st Oceanian team at 2013 World Championship; 1st Asian team at 2013 World Championship; 1st African team at 2013 World Championship replace Italy FINA decision |

== Groups ==
| Group A | Group B |
|---|---|
| Montenegro; Serbia; United States; South Africa | Hungary; Croatia; Australia; Kazakhstan (H) |

== Preliminary round ==
All times are EEST (UTC+3)

=== Group A ===
| | Team | G | W | D | L | GF | GA | Diff | Points | Qualification |
|---|---|---|---|---|---|---|---|---|---|---|
| 1. | Serbia | 3 | 3 | 0 | 0 | 37 | 13 | +24 | 6 | Quarter-finals |
| 2. | United States | 3 | 2 | 0 | 1 | 39 | 19 | +20 | 4 | Quarter-finals |
| 3. | Montenegro | 3 | 1 | 0 | 2 | 22 | 24 | -2 | 2 | Quarter-finals |
| 4. | South Africa | 3 | 0 | 0 | 3 | 6 | 48 | -42 | 0 | Quarter-finals |

| 19 August 2014; 13:00 | Montenegro | 3–9 | Serbia | Almaty, Kazakhstan; Referees: Gábor Vogel (HUN), Mark Maretzki (USA) |
| 19 August 2014; 13:00 | Score by quarters: 0–4, 1–1, 1–2, 1–2 | | | Almaty, Kazakhstan; Referees: Gábor Vogel (HUN), Mark Maretzki (USA) |
| 19 August 2014; 13:00 | three players 1 | Goals | Nikola Eškert 3 | Almaty, Kazakhstan; Referees: Gábor Vogel (HUN), Mark Maretzki (USA) |

| 19 August 2014; 15:40 | South Africa | 1–19 | United States | Almaty, Kazakhstan; Referees: Liang Zhang (CHN), Masoud Rezvani (IRI) |
| 19 August 2014; 15:40 | Score by quarters: 0–4, 0–6, 0–4, 1–5 | | | Almaty, Kazakhstan; Referees: Liang Zhang (CHN), Masoud Rezvani (IRI) |
| 19 August 2014; 15:40 | | Goals | Bret Bonnani 4 | Almaty, Kazakhstan; Referees: Liang Zhang (CHN), Masoud Rezvani (IRI) |

| 20 August 2014; 15:00 | Montenegro | 7–11 | United States | Almaty, Kazakhstan; Referees: Daniel Flahive (AUS), Nenad Periš (CRO) |
| 20 August 2014; 15:00 | Score by quarters: 0–3, 4–3, 0–3, 3-2 | | | Almaty, Kazakhstan; Referees: Daniel Flahive (AUS), Nenad Periš (CRO) |
| 20 August 2014; 15:00 | three players 2 | Goals | three players 2 | Almaty, Kazakhstan; Referees: Daniel Flahive (AUS), Nenad Periš (CRO) |

| 20 August 2014; 16:20 | South Africa | 1–17 | Serbia | Almaty, Kazakhstan; Referees: Viktor Salnichenko (KAZ), Liang Zhang (CHN) |
| 20 August 2014; 16:20 | Score by quarters: 0–4, 1–2, 0–5, 0–6 | | | Almaty, Kazakhstan; Referees: Viktor Salnichenko (KAZ), Liang Zhang (CHN) |
| 20 August 2014; 16:20 | Devon Card 1 | Goals | Gavril Subotić 4 | Almaty, Kazakhstan; Referees: Viktor Salnichenko (KAZ), Liang Zhang (CHN) |

| 21 August 2014; 13:40 | Montenegro | 12–4 | South Africa | Almaty, Kazakhstan; Referees: Masoud Rezvani (IRI), Nenad Periš (CRO) |
| 21 August 2014; 13:40 | Score by quarters: 3–0, 5–2, 3–1, 1–1 | | | Almaty, Kazakhstan; Referees: Masoud Rezvani (IRI), Nenad Periš (CRO) |
| 21 August 2014; 13:40 | two players 4 | Goals | Etienne Le Roux 2 | Almaty, Kazakhstan; Referees: Masoud Rezvani (IRI), Nenad Periš (CRO) |

| 21 August 2014; 16:20 | Serbia | 11–9 | United States | Almaty, Kazakhstan; Referees: Gábor Vogel (HUN), Daniel Flahive (AUS) |
| 21 August 2014; 16:20 | Score by quarters: 2–0, 1–4, 3–1, 5–4 | | | Almaty, Kazakhstan; Referees: Gábor Vogel (HUN), Daniel Flahive (AUS) |
| 21 August 2014; 16:20 | two players 3 | Goals | Bret Bonanni 5 | Almaty, Kazakhstan; Referees: Gábor Vogel (HUN), Daniel Flahive (AUS) |

=== Group B ===
| | Team | G | W | D | L | GF | GA | Diff | Points | Qualification |
|---|---|---|---|---|---|---|---|---|---|---|
| 1. | Hungary | 3 | 2 | 1 | 0 | 32 | 22 | +10 | 5 | Quarter-finals |
| 2. | Croatia | 3 | 2 | 0 | 1 | 25 | 19 | +6 | 4 | Quarter-finals |
| 3. | Australia | 3 | 1 | 1 | 1 | 22 | 22 | 0 | 3 | Quarter-finals |
| 4. | Kazakhstan (H) | 3 | 0 | 0 | 3 | 24 | 40 | -16 | 0 | Quarter-finals |

| 19 August 2014; 14:20 | Croatia | 5–9 | Hungary | Almaty, Kazakhstan; Referees: Doriel Terpenka (CAN), Fabio Toffoli (BRA) |
| 19 August 2014; 14:20 | Score by quarters: 2–3, 1–3, 1–1, 1–2 | | | Almaty, Kazakhstan; Referees: Doriel Terpenka (CAN), Fabio Toffoli (BRA) |
| 19 August 2014; 14:20 | Anđelo Šetka 2 | Goals | Balázs Hárai 2 | Almaty, Kazakhstan; Referees: Doriel Terpenka (CAN), Fabio Toffoli (BRA) |

| 19 August 2014; 17:40 | Kazakhstan | 8–11 | Australia | Almaty, Kazakhstan; Referees: Georgios Stavridis (GRE), Mihajlo Ćirić (SRB) |
| 19 August 2014; 17:40 | Score by quarters: 1–3, 2–1, 4–4, 1–3 | | | Almaty, Kazakhstan; Referees: Georgios Stavridis (GRE), Mihajlo Ćirić (SRB) |
| 19 August 2014; 17:40 | Vladimir Ushakov 3 | Goals | Aaron Younger 4 | Almaty, Kazakhstan; Referees: Georgios Stavridis (GRE), Mihajlo Ćirić (SRB) |

| 20 August 2014; 13:40 | Croatia | 6–3 | Australia | Almaty, Kazakhstan; Referees: Georgios Stavridis (GRE), Ian Melliar (RSA) |
| 20 August 2014; 13:40 | Score by quarters: 1–0, 0–1, 3–1, 1–0 | | | Almaty, Kazakhstan; Referees: Georgios Stavridis (GRE), Ian Melliar (RSA) |
| 20 August 2014; 13:40 | Anđelo Šetka 2 | Goals | Aidan Roach 2 | Almaty, Kazakhstan; Referees: Georgios Stavridis (GRE), Ian Melliar (RSA) |

| 20 August 2014; 17:40 | Kazakhstan | 9–15 | Hungary | Almaty, Kazakhstan; Referees: Dejan Adžić (MNE), Mark Maretzki (USA) |
| 20 August 2014; 17:40 | Score by quarters: 2–3, 2–4, 2–4, 3–4 | | | Almaty, Kazakhstan; Referees: Dejan Adžić (MNE), Mark Maretzki (USA) |
| 20 August 2014; 17:40 | Rustam Ukumanov 3 | Goals | Dénes Varga 4 | Almaty, Kazakhstan; Referees: Dejan Adžić (MNE), Mark Maretzki (USA) |

| 21 August 2014; 15:00 | Australia | 8–8 | Hungary | Almaty, Kazakhstan; Referees: Dejan Adžić (MNE), Fabio Toffoli (BRA) |
| 21 August 2014; 15:00 | Score by quarters: 2–2, 3–3, 3–1, 0–2 | | | Almaty, Kazakhstan; Referees: Dejan Adžić (MNE), Fabio Toffoli (BRA) |
| 21 August 2014; 15:00 | Aaron Younger 3 | Goals | Norbert Madaras 3 | Almaty, Kazakhstan; Referees: Dejan Adžić (MNE), Fabio Toffoli (BRA) |

| 21 August 2014; 17:40 | Kazakhstan | 7–14 | Croatia | Almaty, Kazakhstan; Referees: Doriel Terpenka (CAN), Mihailo Ćirić (SRB) |
| 21 August 2014; 17:40 | Score by quarters: 0–3, 3–2, 1–6, 3–3 | | | Almaty, Kazakhstan; Referees: Doriel Terpenka (CAN), Mihailo Ćirić (SRB) |
| 21 August 2014; 17:40 | Vladimir Ushakov 3 | Goals | two players 3 | Almaty, Kazakhstan; Referees: Doriel Terpenka (CAN), Mihailo Ćirić (SRB) |

== Knockout round ==
=== Championship ===
Quarter-finals
August 22 – Almaty
Serbia | 16
Kazakhstan | 10
August 22 – Almaty
Montenegro | 5
Croatia | 6
August 22 – Almaty
South Africa | 1
Hungary | 15
August 22 – Almaty
United States | 11 (4)
Australia | 9 (2)

Semi-finals
August 23 – Almaty
Serbia | 7
Croatia | 4
August 23 – Almaty
Hungary | 7
United States | 5

Final
August 24 – Almaty
Serbia | 11 (4)
Hungary | 9 (2)
Third place
August 24 – Almaty
Croatia | 8
United States | 6

==== Quarterfinals ====
All times are EEST (UTC+3)

| 22 August 2014; 14:30 | United States | 11–9 (pen.) (OT) | Australia | Almaty, Kazakhstan; Referees: Nenad Periš (CRO), Gábor Vogel (HUN) |
| 22 August 2014; 14:30 | Score by quarters: 3–2, 1–2, 3–1, 0–2 OT: 4–2 | | | Almaty, Kazakhstan; Referees: Nenad Periš (CRO), Gábor Vogel (HUN) |

| 22 August 2014; 15:50 | Montenegro | 5–6 | Croatia | Almaty, Kazakhstan; Referees: Daniel Flahive (AUS), Viktor Salnichenko (KAZ) |
| 22 August 2014; 15:50 | Score by quarters: 2–1, 1–1, 0–3, 2–1 | | | Almaty, Kazakhstan; Referees: Daniel Flahive (AUS), Viktor Salnichenko (KAZ) |

| 22 August 2014; 18:30 | Serbia | 16–10 | Kazakhstan | Almaty, Kazakhstan; Referees: Liang Zhang (CN), Ian Melliar (RSA). |
| 22 August 2014; 18:30 | Score by quarters: 6–2, 3–3, 4–3, 3–2 | | | Almaty, Kazakhstan; Referees: Liang Zhang (CN), Ian Melliar (RSA). |

| 22 August 2014; 17:10 | South Africa | 1–15 | Hungary | Almaty, Kazakhstan; Referees: Masoud Rezvani (IRI), Mark Maretzki (USA) |
| 22 August 2014; 17:10 | Score by quarters: 0–3, 0–5, 0–4, 1–3 | | | Almaty, Kazakhstan; Referees: Masoud Rezvani (IRI), Mark Maretzki (USA) |

==== Semifinals ====
All times are EEST (UTC+3)

| 23 August 2014; 16:20 | Hungary | 7–5 | United States | Almaty, Kazakhstan; Referees: Daniel Flahive (AUS), Liang Zhang (CHN). |
| 23 August 2014; 16:20 | Score by quarters: 3–1, 2–1, 2–2, 0–1 | | | Almaty, Kazakhstan; Referees: Daniel Flahive (AUS), Liang Zhang (CHN). |

| 23 August 2014; 17:40 | Serbia | 7–4 | Croatia | Almaty, Kazakhstan; Referees: Doriel Terpenka (CAN), Fabio Toffoli (BRA) |
| 23 August 2014; 17:40 | Score by quarters: 2–1, 2–0, 3–1, 0–2 | | | Almaty, Kazakhstan; Referees: Doriel Terpenka (CAN), Fabio Toffoli (BRA) |

=== Bronze medal game ===
All times are EEST (UTC+3)

| 24 August 2014; 13:50 | Croatia | 8–6 | United States | Almaty, Kazakhstan; Referees: Gábor Vogel (HUN), Dejan Adžić (MNE). |
| 24 August 2014; 13:50 | Score by quarters: 2–2, 3–1, 2–0, 1–3 | | | Almaty, Kazakhstan; Referees: Gábor Vogel (HUN), Dejan Adžić (MNE). |

=== Gold medal game ===
All times are EEST (UTC+3)

| 24 August 2014; 15:10 | Serbia | 11–9 (pen.) (OT) | Hungary | Almaty, Kazakhstan; Referees: Georgios Stavridis (GRE), Daniel Flahive (AUS). |
| 24 August 2014; 15:10 | Score by quarters: 1–2, 3–3, 1–1, 2–1 OT: 4-2 | | | Almaty, Kazakhstan; Referees: Georgios Stavridis (GRE), Daniel Flahive (AUS). |

=== 5th–8th playoffs ===
Semi-finals
August 23 – Almaty
Australia | 13
South Africa | 2
August 23 – Almaty
Montenegro | 8
Kazakhstan | 9

Fifth place
August 24 – Almaty
Australia | 12
Kazakhstan | 6
Seventh place
August 24 – Almaty
South Africa | 10
Montenegro | 13

==== 5th–8th semifinals ====
All times are EEST (UTC+3)

| 23 August 2014; 14:30 | Australia | 13–2 | South Africa | Almaty, Kazakhstan; Referees: Mihajlo Ćirić (SRB), Masoud Rezvani (IRI). |
| 23 August 2014; 14:30 | Score by quarters: 3–2, 3–0, 5–0, 2–0 | | | Almaty, Kazakhstan; Referees: Mihajlo Ćirić (SRB), Masoud Rezvani (IRI). |

| 23 August 2014; 15:50 | Montenegro | 8–9 | Kazakhstan | Almaty, Kazakhstan; Referees: Georgios Stavridis (GRE), Gábor Vogel (HUN). |
| 23 August 2014; 15:50 | Score by quarters: 2–3, 4–1, 1–1, 1–4 | | | Almaty, Kazakhstan; Referees: Georgios Stavridis (GRE), Gábor Vogel (HUN). |

==== 7th place playoff ====
All times are EEST (UTC+3)

| 24 August 2014; 14:30 | South Africa | 10–13 | Montenegro | Almaty, Kazakhstan; Referees: Mark Maretzki (USA), Viktor Salnichenko (KAZ) |
| 24 August 2014; 14:30 | Score by quarters: 2–3, 1–3, 4–4, 3–3 | | | Almaty, Kazakhstan; Referees: Mark Maretzki (USA), Viktor Salnichenko (KAZ) |

==== 5th place playoff ====
All times are EEST (UTC+3)

| 24 August 2014; 12:30 | Australia | 12–6 | Kazakhstan | Almaty, Kazakhstan; Referees: Nenad Periš (CRO), Ian Melliar (RSA). |
| 24 August 2014; 12:30 | Score by quarters: 1–1, 5–2, 4–2, 2–1 | | | Almaty, Kazakhstan; Referees: Nenad Periš (CRO), Ian Melliar (RSA). |

== Final standings ==
| RANK | TEAM |
|---|---|
| | Serbia |
| | Hungary |
| | Croatia |
| 4. | United States |
| 5. | Australia |
| 6. | Kazakhstan |
| 7. | Montenegro |
| 8. | South Africa |

2014 Men's FINA Water Polo World Cup

Serbia
Fifth title

Team roster

Stefan Živojinović (GK), Nemanja Ubović, Nikola Eškert, Dušan Mandić, Dušan Vasić, Gavril Subotić, Sava Ranđelović, Dimitrije Obradović, Dušan Marković, Strahinja Rašović, Viktor Rašović, Srđan Vuksanović, and Dimitrije Rističević (GK). Head coach: Dejan Savić.

- Serbia, Hungary, Croatia, United States and Australia qualified for the 2015 World Aquatics Championships.

== Individual awards ==
- Best Player
  - Dénes Varga (HUN)
- Best Goalkeeper
  - Stefan Živojinović (SRB)
- Defender
  - Jesse Smith (USA)
- Best Scorer
  - Bret Bonanni (USA)
