= 2009 FINA Men's Water Polo World League =

- League: FINA Water Polo World League
- Sport: Water Polo
- Duration: 22 May – 21 June 2009
- Number of teams: 19
- League champions: Montenegro

FINA Men's Water Polo World League seasons
- ← 2008 2010 →

The 2009 FINA Men's Water Polo World League was the eighth edition of the annual event, organised by the world's governing body in aquatics, the FINA. After a preliminary round organized by continent, the Super Final was held in Podgorica, Montenegro, from 16 to 21 June 2009.

The league consisted of 19 teams following the withdrawal of two teams. Two nations, South Africa and Libya, had their World League debut, with Libya competing in its first major international tournament.

== Preliminary round ==
Team qualifies for Super Final
Team eliminated from qualification

=== Africa ===
The African tournament will be held in Casablanca, Morocco, from 22 May to 24 May. One team from the group of four will advance. South Africa and Libya will make their World League debuts.

Team	G	W	OTW	OTL	L	GF	GA	Diff	Pts
South Africa	6	6	0	0	0	216	17	+199	18
Algeria	6	4	0	0	2	62	72	−10	12
Morocco	6	2	0	0	4	68	71	−3	6
Libya	6	0	0	0	6	4	190	−186	0

22 May

South Africa	23 – 3	Morocco
Algeria	26 – 1	Libya

23 May

Morocco	27 – 1	Libya
Algeria	6 – 25	South Africa
South Africa	42 – 0	Libya
Morocco	6 – 8	Algeria

24 May

South Africa	60 – 0	Libya
Morocco	5 – 6	Algeria
South Africa	34 – 2	Algeria
Morocco	21 – 1	Libya

25 May

South Africa	32 – 6	Morocco
Algeria	14 – 1	Libya

=== Americas ===
United States qualified without a qualification tournament.

=== Asia/Oceania ===
The Asia and Oceania region will feature a two-legged tournament, in Adelaide, Australia (22–24 May), and Auckland, New Zealand (29–31 May). The four teams will play a round robin in each location, with the results from both legs combined. The top two teams from the group of four will advance.

Team	G	W	OTW	OTL	L	GF	GA	Diff	Pts
Australia	6	6	0	0	0	94	27	+67	18
Japan	6	4	0	0	2	73	58	+15	12
Iran	6	1	1	0	4	49	86	−37	5
New Zealand	6	0	0	1	5	45	90	−45	1

22 May

Japan	15 – 7	New Zealand
Australia	13 – 1	Iran

23 May

Australia	12 – 3	New Zealand
Japan	18 – 9	Iran

24 May

Iran	12 – 8	New Zealand
Australia	15 – 8	Japan

29 May

Iran	6 – 14	Japan
New Zealand	5 – 22	Australia

30 May

Australia	20 – 7	Iran
New Zealand	9 – 15	Japan

31 May

New Zealand	13 – 14 (pen.)	Iran
Japan	3 – 12	Australia

=== Europe ===
Europe is divided into three groups, with qualifying spots for the winner of each group as well as Super Final host Montenegro. The initial plan was for each group to have four teams. However, Great Britain and Hungary have dropped out.

Rather than the condensed tournament style competition of the other continents, the European matches will be played in a home-and-away format over five months. The pool-based nature of the qualification process, however, continues to be used.

==== Europe A ====
Hungary was to have played in this group.

Team	G	W	OTW	OTL	L	GF	GA	Diff	Pts
Serbia	4	4	0	0	0	46	23	+23	12
Greece	4	2	0	0	2	41	37	+4	6
France	4	0	0	0	4	25	52	−27	0

21 January

Serbia	12 – 6	France

17 February

Greece	16 – 6	France

10 March

Greece	6 – 11	Serbia

29 April

France	4 – 12	Serbia

5 May

France	9 – 12	Greece

12 May

Serbia	11 – 7	Greece

==== Europe B ====
Great Britain was to have been the fourth member of this group, but withdrew.

Team	G	W	OTW	OTL	L	GF	GA	Diff	Pts
Montenegro	4	4	0	0	0	41	26	+15	12
Italy	4	1	0	0	3	30	31	– 1	3
Romania	4	1	0	0	3	30	44	−14	3

21 January

Italy	10 – 2	Romania

17 February

Montenegro	13 – 7	Romania

3 March

Italy	6 – 8	Montenegro

15 April

Romania	12 – 10	Italy

5 May

Romania	9 – 11	Montenegro

12 May

Montenegro	9 – 4	Italy

==== Europe C ====
Team	G	W	OTW	OTL	L	GF	GA	Diff	Pts
Croatia	6	5	0	0	1	69	48	+21	15
Spain	6	3	1	0	2	51	49	+2	11
Germany	6	2	0	0	4	46	57	−11	6
Russia	6	1	0	1	4	54	66	−12	4

21 January

Croatia	12 – 7	Russia
Spain	8 – 7	Germany

17 February

Croatia	13 – 7	Germany
Spain	14 – 13 (pen.)	Russia

10 March

Croatia	11 – 8	Spain
Russia	7 – 10	Germany

31 March

Germany	6 – 8	Spain

14 April

Russia	12 – 15	Croatia

5 May

Germany	5 – 11	Croatia

8 May

Russia	5 – 4	Spain

12 May

Germany	11 – 10	Russia
Spain	9 – 7	Croatia

== Super Final ==
The Super Final will be held in Podgorica, Montenegro, from 16 June to 21 June.

=== Group 1 ===
Team	G	W	OTW	OTL	L	GF	GA	Diff	Pts
Serbia	3	3	0	0	0	28	17	+11	9
United States	3	2	0	0	1	31	19	+12	6
Italy	3	1	0	0	2	24	22	+2	3
Japan	3	0	0	0	3	15	40	−25	0

16 June

United States	10 – 6	Italy
Serbia	12 – 6	Japan

17 June

Italy	4 – 6	Serbia
United States	14 – 3	Japan

18 June

Japan	6 – 14	Italy
Serbia	10 – 7	United States

=== Group 2 ===
Team	G	W	OTW	OTL	L	GF	GA	Diff	Pts
Montenegro	3	3	0	0	0	36	16	+20	9
Croatia	3	2	0	0	1	28	21	+7	6
Australia	3	1	0	0	2	23	19	+4	3
South Africa	3	0	0	0	3	12	43	−31	0

16 June

Australia	6 – 9	Croatia
Montenegro	18 – 5	South Africa

17 June

South Africa	4 – 13	Australia
Montenegro	12 – 7	Croatia

18 June

South Africa	3 – 12	Croatia
Montenegro	6 – 4	Australia

=== Quarterfinals ===
19 June

United States	10 – 6	Australia
Italy	6 – 8	Croatia
Serbia	16 – 2	South Africa
Montenegro	18 – 2	Japan

=== 5th-8th places ===
Semifinals
20 June
Australia	12
Japan	6
20 June
Italy	14
South Africa	3

5th place match
21 June
Australia	10
Italy	11
7th place match
21 June
Japan	11
South Africa	9

=== Medal round ===
Semifinals
20 June
United States	6
Montenegro	10
20 June
Croatia	7
Serbia	5

Final
21 June
Montenegro	8
Croatia	7
Bronze game
21 June
United States	7
Serbia	9

== Final ranking ==
RANK	TEAM
	Montenegro
	Croatia
	Serbia
4.	United States
5.	Italy
6.	Australia
7.	Japan
8.	South Africa

2009 FINA Men's World League

Montenegro
First title

=== Awards ===
Top Scorer
(Montenegro) Nikola Janović
