= 2010 FINA Men's Water Polo World League =

- League: FINA Water Polo World League
- Sport: Water Polo

FINA Men's Water Polo World League seasons
- ← 2009 2011 →

The 2010 FINA Men's Water Polo World League was the ninth edition of the annual event, organised by the world's governing body in aquatics, the FINA. After a preliminary round organized by continent, the Super Final was held in Niš, Serbia from July 13–18, 2010.
Serbia won this year's edition after a final victory over Montenegro 14–12.

== Preliminary round ==
Team qualified for Super Final

=== Africa ===
The African tournament was held in Tunis, Tunisia from June 17–20. One team from the group of four advanced.

Team	G	W	L	GF	GA	Diff	Pts
South Africa	6	6	0	97	25	+72	18
Tunisia	6	4	2	86	39	+47	12
Algeria	6	2	4	50	96	−46	5
Morocco	6	0	6	32	105	−73	1

June 17

Tunisia	18 – 3	Morocco
South Africa	19 – 3	Algeria

June 18

Morocco	2 – 21	South Africa
Algeria	4 – 25	Tunisia
Tunisia	8 – 11	South Africa
Morocco	14 – 15	Algeria

June 19

Morocco	4 – 16	Tunisia
South Africa	17 – 5	Algeria
South Africa	19 – 3	Morocco
Tunisia	15 – 7	Algeria

June 20

Algeria	16 – 6	Morocco
South Africa	10 – 4	Tunisia

=== Americas ===
The American tournament was held in Los Alamitos, California, United States from May 5–8. One team from the group of three advanced.

Team	G	W	L	GF	GA	Diff	Pts
United States	4	4	0	69	12	+57	12
Brazil	4	2	2	52	32	+20	6
Venezuela	4	0	4	8	85	−77	0

May 5

Brazil	21 – 2	Venezuela

May 6

Brazil	19 – 6	Venezuela
United States	24 – 0	Venezuela

May 7

United States	12 – 8	Brazil

May 8

United States	12 – 4	Brazil
United States	21 – 0	Venezuela

=== Asia/Oceania ===
The Asia and Oceania region was feature a two-legged tournament, in Osaka, Japan (May 19–23) and Tianjin, China (May 26–30). The four teams was play a round robin in each location, with the results from both legs combined. The top two teams from the group of six advanced.

Team	G	W	L	GF	GA	Diff	Pts
Australia	10	10	0	148	52	+96	30
China	10	8	2	117	86	+31	24
Kazakhstan	10	5	5	132	85	+47	15
Japan	10	5	5	125	83	+42	15
New Zealand	10	2	8	69	161	−92	6
Iran	10	0	10	59	183	−124	0

May 19

China	13 – 9	Kazakhstan
Iran	12 – 15	New Zealand
Japan	11 – 16	Australia

May 20

China	18 – 8	Iran
Australia	10 – 5	Kazakhstan
Japan	16 – 4	New Zealand

May 21

China	17 – 6	New Zealand
Australia	23 – 1	Iran
Japan	7 – 6	Kazakhstan

May 22

Kazakhstan	21 – 6	New Zealand
Australia	15 – 4	China
Japan	15 – 6	Iran

May 23

Australia	17 – 3	New Zealand
Iran	8 – 23	Kazakhstan
Japan	5 – 9	China

May 26

Australia	9 – 8	Japan
Kazakhstan	20 – 5	New Zealand
China	11 – 5	Iran

May 27

Australia	14 – 4	New Zealand
Kazakhstan	21 – 5	Iran
China	12 – 11	Japan

May 28

Australia	11 – 7	Kazakhstan
Japan	24 – 2	Iran
China	15 – 8	New Zealand

May 29

Australia	23 – 3	Iran
Japan	20 – 8	New Zealand
China	12 – 9	Kazakhstan

May 30

Australia	10 – 6	China
New Zealand	10 – 9	Iran
Kazakhstan	11 – 8	Japan

=== Europe ===
Europe is divided into three groups of four teams, with qualifying spots for the winner of each group as well as Super Final host Serbia. Rather than the condensed tournament style competition of the other continents, the European matches was played in a home-and-away format over five months.

==== Group A ====
Team	G	W	L	GF	GA	Diff	Pts
Montenegro	6	5	1	59	36	+23	15
Italy	6	5	1	54	34	+20	15
Germany	6	1	5	36	57	−21	3
France	6	1	5	38	60	−22	3

November 17

France	8 – 12	Montenegro	Bordeaux
Italy	8 – 5	Germany	Sori

December 8

France	7 – 11	Italy	Nancy
Germany	7 – 16	Montenegro	Stuttgart

January 26

Italy	8 – 7	Montenegro	Brescia
Germany	7 – 6	France	Magdeburg

February 23

Germany	4 – 11	Italy	Berlin
Montenegro	11 – 3	France	Kotor

March 16

Italy	11 – 5	France	Florence
Montenegro	7 – 5	Germany	Igalo

April 28

Montenegro	6 – 5	Italy	Budva

June 1

France	9 – 8	Germany	Marseille

==== Group B ====
Team	G	W	L	GF	GA	Diff	Pts
Croatia	6	5	1	71	53	+18	16
Russia	6	3	3	52	51	+1	9
Greece	6	3	3	53	57	−4	8
North Macedonia	6	1	5	40	55	−15	3

November 17

Russia	9 – 6	Greece	Kirishi
North Macedonia	7 – 9	Croatia	Skopje

December 8

Croatia	12 – 7	Russia	Makarska
Greece	8 – 6	North Macedonia	Athens

January 26

Greece	17 – 16	Croatia	Athens
North Macedonia	3 – 4	Russia	Skopje

February 23

Croatia	12 – 9	North Macedonia	Varaždin
Greece	10 – 9	Russia	Athens

March 16

North Macedonia	7 – 6	Greece	Skopje
Russia	7 – 8	Croatia	Kirishi

June 22

Russia	16 – 8	North Macedonia	Moscow

July 3

Croatia	10 – 6	Greece	Dubrovnik

==== Group C ====
Team	G	W	L	GF	GA	Diff	Pts
Serbia	6	6	0	79	33	+46	18
Spain	6	3	3	54	45	+9	9
Romania	6	3	3	55	59	−4	9
Turkey	6	0	6	36	87	−51	0

November 17

Romania	9 – 7	Spain	Oradea
Serbia	19 – 5	Turkey	Niš

December 8

Turkey	4 – 9	Spain	Istanbul
Romania	5 – 7	Serbia	Oradea

January 26

Serbia	7 – 6	Spain	Niš
Turkey	8 – 16	Romania	Istanbul

February 23

Turkey	3 – 16	Serbia	Istanbul
Spain	9 – 7	Romania	Pontevedra

March 16

Spain	14 – 6	Turkey	Pontevedra
Serbia	18 – 5	Romania	Belgrade

April 20

Romania	13 – 10	Turkey	Oradea

April 27

Spain	9 – 12	Serbia	Pontevedra

== Super Final ==
The Super Final was held in Niš, Serbia from July 13–18.

=== Group 1 ===
Team	G	W	L	GF	GA	Diff	Pts
Montenegro	3	3	0	38	20	+18	8
United States	3	2	1	27	19	+8	7
Spain	3	1	2	21	23	−2	3
China	3	0	3	14	38	−24	0

July 13

Montenegro	16 – 4	China
United States	7 – 3	Spain

July 14

United States	11 – 5	China
Montenegro	11 – 7	Spain

July 15

Montenegro	11 – 9	United States
China	5 – 11	Spain

=== Group 2 ===
Team	G	W	L	GF	GA	Diff	Pts
Serbia	3	3	0	39	14	+25	9
Australia	3	2	1	35	19	+16	6
Croatia	3	1	2	37	20	+17	3
South Africa	3	0	3	5	63	−58	0

July 13

Australia	10 – 7	Croatia
Serbia	22 – 0	South Africa

July 14

Australia	19 – 4	South Africa
Serbia	9 – 8	Croatia

July 15

South Africa	1 – 22	Croatia
Serbia	8 – 6	Australia

=== Quarter-finals ===
July 16

United States	11 – 13	Croatia
Spain	5 – 6	Australia
Montenegro	21 – 2	South Africa
China	4 – 17	Serbia

=== Medal round ===
Semi-finals
July 17
Croatia	11
Serbia	14
July 17
Australia	6
Montenegro	8

Final
July 18
Serbia	14
Montenegro	12
Bronze-final
July 18
Croatia	9
Australia	7

=== 5th–8th places ===
Semi-finals
July 17
United States	13
China	6
July 17
Spain	12
South Africa	1

5th place match
July 18
United States	7
Spain	6
7th place match
July 18
China	11
South Africa	5

== Final ranking ==
RANK	TEAM
	Serbia
	Montenegro
	Croatia
4.	Australia
5.	United States
6.	Spain
7.	China
8.	South Africa

2010 FINA Men's World League

Serbia
Fifth title

=== Awards ===
Top Scorer
(Montenegro) Nikola Janović
