= 2018 FINA Men's Water Polo World League =

- League: FINA Water Polo World League
- Sport: Water Polo
- Duration: 14 November 2017 to 23 June 2018

Super Final
- Finals champions: Montenegro (2nd title)
- Runners-up: Hungary

FINA Men's Water Polo World League seasons
- ← 2017 2019 →

The 2018 FINA Men's Water Polo World League is the 17th edition of the annual men's international water polo tournament. It will be played between November 2017 and June 2018 and opened to all men's water polo national teams. After participating in a preliminary round, eight teams qualify to play in a final tournament, called the Super Final from 18–23 June 2018. The top two teams also automatically qualify for the 2019 FINA World Aquatics Championships in 2019.

In the world league, there are specific rules that do not allow matches to end in a draw. If teams are level at the end of the 4th quarter of any world league match, the match will be decided by a penalty shootout. Teams earn points in the standings in group matches as follows:

- Match won in normal time – 3 points
- Match won in shootout – 2 points
- Match lost in shootout – 1 point
- Match lost in normal time – 0 points

== Preliminary rounds ==
=== European Preliminaries ===
- November 14, 2017 – April 10, 2018

==== Group A ====
Pos	Team	Pld	W	OTW	OTL	L	GF	GA	GD	Pts	Qualification	Montenegro	Serbia	Romania
1	Montenegro	4	3	0	0	1	40	21	+19	9	Super Final	—	11–8	13–2
2	Serbia	4	3	0	0	1	41	25	+16	9		7–4	—	12–3
3	Romania	4	0	0	0	4	16	51	−35	0		4–12	7–14	—

Source: FINA
Rules for classification: Only goals scored in regular time are counted.

==== Group B ====
Pos	Team	Pld	W	OTW	OTL	L	GF	GA	GD	Pts	Qualification	Croatia	Russia	Germany
1	Croatia	4	4	0	0	0	58	25	+33	12	Super Final	—	14–4	14–8
2	Russia	4	1	1	0	2	37	51	−14	5		9–17	—	16–12
3	Germany	4	0	0	1	3	32	51	−19	1		4–13	8–8 (3–4)	—

Source: FINA
Rules for classification: Only goals scored in regular time are counted.

==== Group C ====
Pos	Team	Pld	W	OTW	OTL	L	GF	GA	GD	Pts	Qualification	Hungary	Spain	Netherlands
1	Hungary	4	3	0	1	0	45	25	+20	10	Host Super Final	—	9–8	13–1
2	Spain	4	2	1	0	1	39	28	+11	8	Super Final	10–10 (5–3)	—	9–5
3	Netherlands	4	0	0	0	4	16	47	−31	0		6–13	4–12	—

Source: FINA
Rules for classification: Only goals scored in regular time are counted.

=== Inter-Continental Cup ===
- April 3–8, 2018, Auckland, New Zealand
- All times are New Zealand Standard Time (UTC+12:00)

==== Group A ====
Pos	Team	Pld	W	OTW	OTL	L	GF	GA	GD	Pts	Qualification	Australia	Kazakhstan	Canada	Argentina	New Zealand
1	Australia	3	3	0	0	0	52	21	+31	9	Super Final	—		15–8		
2	Kazakhstan	3	1	1	0	1	24	38	−14	5	Super Final	6–21	—	10–9	8–8 (4–1)	
3	Canada	3	1	0	0	2	27	28	−1	3				—		
4	Argentina	3	0	0	1	2	18	34	−16	1		7–16		3–10	—	
5	New Zealand 2 (Note: New Zealand was represented by 2nd team)	0	0	0	0	0	0	0	0	0 (Note: Matches of New Zealand 2 are not counted in the competition)		0–20	7–15	9–20	3–18	—

Source: FINA
Rules for classification: Only goals scored in regular time are counted.

==== Group B ====
Pos	Team	Pld	W	OTW	OTL	L	GF	GA	GD	Pts	Qualification	United States	Japan	New Zealand	People's Republic of China	Saudi Arabia
1	United States	4	4	0	0	0	62	18	+44	12	Super Final	—				18–3
2	Japan	4	3	0	0	1	62	31	+31	9	Super Final	10–12	—			18–5
3	New Zealand (H)	4	2	0	0	2	38	52	−14	6		3–18	10–18	—		15–9
4	China	4	1	0	0	3	26	45	−19	3		2–14	4–16	7–10	—	13–5
5	Saudi Arabia	4	0	0	0	4	22	64	−42	0						—

Source: FINA
Rules for classification: Only goals scored in regular time are counted.
(H) Host

==== Final round ====
9th Place

8 April 2018; 11:20	New Zealand 2 (Note: New Zealand was represented by 2nd team)	10–11 (Note: Match is not counted in the competition)	Saudi Arabia	Auckland, New Zealand
8 April 2018; 11:20	Score by quarters: 2–4, 3–2, 2–2, 3–3			Auckland, New Zealand

7th Place

8 April 2018; 12:40	Argentina	6–5	China	Auckland, New Zealand
8 April 2018; 12:40	Score by quarters: 1–1, 0–2, 0–1, 5–1			Auckland, New Zealand

5th Place

8 April 2018; 14:00	Canada	12–6	New Zealand	Auckland, New Zealand
8 April 2018; 14:00	Score by quarters: 1–1, 4–0, 2–2, 5–3			Auckland, New Zealand

3rd Place

8 April 2018; 15:20	Kazakhstan	7–12	Japan	Auckland, New Zealand
8 April 2018; 15:20	Score by quarters: 1–4, 1–3, 2–3, 3–2			Auckland, New Zealand

1st Place

8 April 2018; 19:40	Australia	6–9	United States	Auckland, New Zealand
8 April 2018; 19:40	Score by quarters: 2–3, 1–1, 2–3, 1–2			Auckland, New Zealand

==== Final ranking ====
Qualified to Super Final

Rank	Team
Gold medal	United States
Silver medal	Australia
Bronze medal	Japan
4	Kazakhstan
5	Canada
6	New Zealand
7	Argentina
8	China
9	Saudi Arabia

== Super Final ==
- June 18–23, 2018, Danube Arena, Budapest, Hungary
- All times are Central European Summer Time (UTC+02:00)

=== Qualified teams ===
Africa	Americas	Asia	Europe	Oceania
—	United States	Japan; Kazakhstan	Croatia; Hungary (re-Host); Montenegro; ~~Russia (Host)~~; Spain	Australia

=== Seeding ===
Group A	Group B
Australia (2nd ICC); Montenegro (1st Europe Group A); Japan (3rd ICC); Hungary (1st Europe Group C) (re-Host)	United States (1st ICC); Croatia (1st Europe Group B); Kazakhstan (4th ICC); ~~Russia (Host)~~; Spain (Replaced Russia)

=== Group A ===
Pos	Team	Pld	W	OTW	OTL	L	GF	GA	GD	Pts	Qualification
1	Montenegro	3	3	0	0	0	36	25	+11	9	Quarterfinals
2	Hungary (H)	3	2	0	0	1	35	24	+11	6	Quarterfinals
3	Australia	3	1	0	0	2	24	29	−5	3	Quarterfinals
4	Japan	3	0	0	0	3	22	39	−17	0	Quarterfinals

Source: FINA
Rules for classification: Only goals scored in regular time are counted.
(H) Host

18 June 2018; 16:45	Montenegro	14–8	Japan	Budapest, Hungary
18 June 2018; 16:45	Score by quarters: 4–1, 3–4, 5–2, 2–1			Budapest, Hungary

18 June 2018; 20:00	Australia	5–12	Hungary	Budapest, Hungary
18 June 2018; 20:00	Score by quarters: 1–3, 1–1, 2–5, 1–3			Budapest, Hungary

19 June 2018; 15:15	Australia	11–7	Japan	Budapest, Hungary
19 June 2018; 15:15	Score by quarters: 4–1, 2–2, 2–1, 3–3			Budapest, Hungary

19 June 2018; 18:15	Montenegro	12–9	Hungary	Budapest, Hungary
19 June 2018; 18:15	Score by quarters: 3–2, 3–5, 3–2, 3–0			Budapest, Hungary

20 June 2018; 16:45	Montenegro	10–8	Australia	Budapest, Hungary
20 June 2018; 16:45	Score by quarters: 3–2, 3–2, 3–2, 1–2			Budapest, Hungary

20 June 2018; 20:00	Japan	7–14	Hungary	Budapest, Hungary
20 June 2018; 20:00	Score by quarters: 1–5, 2–3, 2–3, 2–3			Budapest, Hungary

=== Group B ===
Pos	Team	Pld	W	OTW	OTL	L	GF	GA	GD	Pts	Qualification
1	United States	3	3	0	0	0	30	20	+10	9	Quarterfinals
2	Spain	3	1	1	0	1	26	20	+6	5	Quarterfinals
3	Croatia	3	1	0	1	1	34	25	+9	4	Quarterfinals
4	Kazakhstan	3	0	0	0	3	12	37	−25	0	Quarterfinals

Source: FINA
Rules for classification: Only goals scored in regular time are counted.

18 June 2018; 15:15	Croatia	15–5	Kazakhstan	Budapest, Hungary
18 June 2018; 15:15	Score by quarters: 3–1, 3–1, 4–3, 5–0			Budapest, Hungary

18 June 2018; 18:15	United States	8–6	Spain	Budapest, Hungary
18 June 2018; 18:15	Score by quarters: 2–3, 3–1, 1–1, 2–1			Budapest, Hungary

19 June 2018; 16:45	Croatia	10–13 (PSO)	Spain	Budapest, Hungary
19 June 2018; 16:45	Score by quarters: 4–4, 1–3, 3–2, 1–0 PSO: 1–4			Budapest, Hungary

19 June 2018; 19:45	United States	11–4	Kazakhstan	Budapest, Hungary
19 June 2018; 19:45	Score by quarters: 2–0, 3–2, 3–0, 3–2			Budapest, Hungary

20 June 2018; 15:15	Croatia	10–11	United States	Budapest, Hungary
20 June 2018; 15:15	Score by quarters: 1–2, 2–5, 5–4, 2–0			Budapest, Hungary

20 June 2018; 18:15	Kazakhstan	3–11	Spain	Budapest, Hungary
20 June 2018; 18:15	Score by quarters: 0–2, 1–2, 0–4, 2–3			Budapest, Hungary

=== Knockout stage ===
Quarterfinals
21 June 2018
Hungary (pen.)	6 (4)
Croatia	6 (2)
21 June 2018
Japan	11
United States	10
21 June 2018
Australia	4
Spain	9
21 June 2018
Montenegro	14
Kazakhstan	6

Semifinals
22 June 2018
Hungary	11
Japan	9
22 June 2018
Spain	8
Montenegro	10

Final
23 June 2018
Hungary	9 (2)
Montenegro (pen.)	9 (4)
Third place
23 June 2018
Japan	7
Spain	12

5th–8th Places

Semifinals
22 June 2018
Croatia	10
United States	7
22 June 2018
Australia	15
Kazakhstan	11

Fifth place
23 June 2018
Croatia	10
Australia	8
Seventh place
23 June 2018
United States	9
Kazakhstan	3

Quarterfinals

21 June 2018; 15:15	Montenegro	14–6	Kazakhstan	Budapest, Hungary
21 June 2018; 15:15	Score by quarters: 5–2, 2–2, 5–1, 2–1			Budapest, Hungary

21 June 2018; 16:45	Australia	4–9	Spain	Budapest, Hungary
21 June 2018; 16:45	Score by quarters: 2–1, 0–1, 0–2, 2–5			Budapest, Hungary

21 June 2018; 18:15	Hungary	10–8 (PSO)	Croatia	Budapest, Hungary
21 June 2018; 18:15	Score by quarters: 1–1, 1–1, 3–2, 1–2 PSO: 4–2			Budapest, Hungary

21 June 2018; 19:45	Japan	11–10	United States	Budapest, Hungary
21 June 2018; 19:45	Score by quarters: 2–3, 4–3, 2–1, 3–3			Budapest, Hungary

5th–8th Semifinals

22 June 2018; 15:15	Croatia	10–7	United States	Budapest, Hungary
22 June 2018; 15:15	Score by quarters: 3–2, 0–1, 3–1, 4–3			Budapest, Hungary

22 June 2018; 16:45	Australia	15–11	Kazakhstan	Budapest, Hungary
22 June 2018; 16:45	Score by quarters: 4–1, 5–4, 4–2, 2–4			Budapest, Hungary

Semifinals

22 June 2018; 18:15	Hungary	11–9	Japan	Budapest, Hungary
22 June 2018; 18:15	Score by quarters: 2–1, 0–4, 7–3, 2–1			Budapest, Hungary

22 June 2018; 19:45	Spain	8–10	Montenegro	Budapest, Hungary
22 June 2018; 19:45	Score by quarters: 2–3, 2–2, 1–3, 3–2			Budapest, Hungary

Seventh place

23 June 2018; 15:15	United States	9–3	Kazakhstan	Budapest, Hungary
23 June 2018; 15:15	Score by quarters: 4–0, 0–1, 3–1, 2–1			Budapest, Hungary

Fifth place

23 June 2018; 16:45	Croatia	10–8	Australia	Budapest, Hungary
23 June 2018; 16:45	Score by quarters: 3–2, 2–2, 4–3, 1–1			Budapest, Hungary

Third place

23 June 2018; 18:15	Japan	7–12	Spain	Budapest, Hungary
23 June 2018; 18:15	Score by quarters: 2–4, 3–3, 2–1, 0–4			Budapest, Hungary

Final

23 June 2018; 19:45	Hungary	11–13 (PSO)	Montenegro	Budapest, Hungary
23 June 2018; 19:45	Score by quarters: 2–2, 4–2, 2–3, 1–2 PSO: 2–4			Budapest, Hungary

=== Final ranking ===
Rank	Team
Gold medal	Montenegro
Silver medal	Hungary
Bronze medal	Spain
4	Japan
5	Croatia
6	Australia
7	United States
8	Kazakhstan

2018 FINA Men's Water Polo World League champions

Montenegro
Second title

==== Awards ====
MVP	Highest Scorer	Best Goalkeeper	Best Young Player
(Hungary) Márton Vámos	(Montenegro) Aleksandar Ivović (Montenegro) Mlađan Janović (Japan) Inada Yosuke (14 goals)	(Hungary) Viktor Nagy	(Montenegro) Đuro Radović
