= Algeria men's national water polo team =

Algeria
- FINA code: ALG
- Confederation: CANA (Africa)

World League
- Appearances: 1 (first in 2008)
- Best result: Preliminary round, 2008

The Algeria men's national water polo team is the representative for Algeria in international men's water polo.

== Results ==
=== FINA World League ===
- 2002 — Didn't participate
- 2003 — Didn't participate
- 2004 — Didn't participate
- 2005 — Didn't participate
- 2006 — Didn't participate
- 2007 — Didn't participate
- 2008 — Preliminary round
- 2009 — Preliminary round
- 2010 — Preliminary round
