= 2008 FINA Men's Water Polo World League =

- League: FINA Water Polo World League
- Sport: Water Polo
- Duration: 6 – 22 June 2008
- League champions: Serbia

FINA Men's Water Polo World League seasons
- ← 2007 2009 →

The 2008 FINA Men's Water Polo World League was the seventh edition of the annual event, organised by the world's governing body in aquatics, the FINA. After five preliminary rounds, the Super Final was held in Genoa, Italy from 16-22 June 2008.

== Preliminary round ==
=== Africa ===
- Held in Casablanca, Morocco

	Team	Pts	G	W	L
1	Egypt	9	3	3	0
2	Algeria	5	3	2	1
3	Morocco	4	3	1	2
4	Tunisia	0	3	0	3

June 6

Morocco	17 – 6	Tunisia
Egypt	16 – 6	Algeria

June 7

Tunisia	1 – 20	Egypt
Algeria	10 – 8 (p)	Morocco

June 8

Algeria	15 – 2	Tunisia
Egypt	23 – 5	Morocco

=== Americas ===
Canada and United States qualified without qualification tournament.

=== Asia/Oceania ===
- Held in Tokyo, Japan

	Team	Pts	G	W	L
1	Australia	24	8	8	0
2	China	18	8	6	2
3	Japan	12	8	4	4
4	New Zealand	5	8	2	6
5	Iran	1	8	0	8

May 26

Japan	9 – 2	Iran
New Zealand	0 – 25	Australia
China	18 – 3	Iran
Japan	5 – 10	Australia

May 27

New Zealand	5 – 13	China
Australia	18 – 2	Iran
New Zealand	17 – 11	Iran
Japan	6 – 9	China

May 28

China	6 – 14	Australia
Japan	14 – 7	New Zealand
China	16 – 2	Iran
Japan	15 – 8	New Zealand

May 29

New Zealand	11 – 10 (p)	Iran
Australia	19 – 6	China
Australia	20 – 1	Iran
Japan	7 – 11	China

May 30

Japan	6 – 13	Australia
China	14 – 8	New Zealand
New Zealand	4 – 16	Australia
Japan	9 – 4	Iran

=== Europe I ===
- Held in Budva, Montenegro and Athens, Greece.

	Team	Pts	G	W	L
1	Montenegro	14	6	5	1
2	Greece	12	6	4	2
3	Croatia	8	6	3	3
4	Italy	2	6	0	6

- Italy qualified as the hosting nation of the Super Final

May 23

Croatia	12 – 4	Greece
Montenegro	9 – 7	Italy

May 24

Italy	6 – 9	Croatia
Montenegro	14 – 6	Greece

May 25

Greece	13 – 7	Italy
Montenegro	13 – 11	Croatia

May 30

Croatia	15 – 14 (p)	Italy
Greece	11 – 10	Montenegro

May 31

Greece	13 – 5	Croatia
Montenegro	11 – 10 (p)	Italy

June 1

Croatia	9 – 13	Montenegro
Greece	10 – 8	Italy

=== Europe II ===
- Held in Novi Sad, Serbia and Portugalete, Spain.

	Team	Pts	G	W	L
1	Serbia	18	6	6	0
2	Spain	9	6	3	3
3	Russia	6	6	2	4
4	Romania	3	6	1	5

May 23

Serbia	10 – 6	Spain
Romania	10 – 6	Russia

May 24

Serbia	11 – 9	Romania
Russia	9 – 6	Spain

May 25

Serbia	12 – 4	Russia
Romania	10 – 12	Spain

May 30

Spain	11 – 8	Romania
Russia	8 – 13	Serbia

May 31

Serbia	11 – 3	Romania
Spain	14 – 8	Russia

June 1

Russia	14 – 13	Romania
Spain	5 – 11	Serbia

== Super Final ==
- Held in Genova, Italy

=== Group A ===
	Team	Pts	G	W	L
1	United States	10	4	3	1
2	Montenegro	8	4	3	1
3	Spain	6	4	2	2
4	Italy	5	4	2	2
5	China	0	4	0	4

June 16

Montenegro	15 – 7	Spain
United States	14 – 15 (p)	Italy

June 17

United States	13 – 9	China
Italy	8 – 9	Spain

June 18

Spain	8 – 6	China
Italy	15 – 16 (p)	Montenegro

June 19

China	7 – 13	Montenegro
Spain	4 – 11	United States

June 20

Montenegro	6 – 7	United States
China	8 – 15	Italy

=== Group B ===
	Team	Pts	G	W	L
1	Serbia	12	4	4	0
2	Australia	9	4	3	1
3	Canada	6	4	2	2
4	Greece	3	4	1	3
5	Egypt	0	4	0	4

June 16

Australia	21 – 0	Egypt
Serbia	10 – 9	Greece

June 17

Egypt	2 – 14	Greece
Australia	11 – 7	Canada

June 18

Greece	6 – 9	Canada
Egypt	0 – 31	Serbia

June 19

Canada	4 – 11	Serbia
Greece	9 – 13	Australia

June 20

Serbia	11 – 5	Australia
Canada	17 – 1	Egypt

=== 9th place match ===
June 21

China	23 – 5	Egypt

=== 5th-8th places ===
Semi-finals
June 21
Canada	10
Italy	8
June 21
Spain	11
Greece	10

5th place match
June 22
Canada	9
Spain	10
7th place match
June 22
Italy	11
Greece	7

=== Medal round ===
Semi-finals
June 21
Serbia	13
Montenegro	3
June 21
United States	11
Australia	10

Final
June 22
Serbia	7
United States	3
Bronze-final
June 22
Montenegro	7
Australia	8

== Final ranking ==
RANK	TEAM
	Serbia
	United States
	Australia
4.	Montenegro
5.	Spain
6.	Canada
7.	Italy
8.	Greece
9.	China
10.	Egypt

2008 FINA Men's World League

Serbia
Fourth title

=== Awards ===
Top Scorer
(Serbia) Aleksandar Šapić
