= Australia men's national water polo team =

Men's national water polo team representing Australia

Australia
- FINA code: AUS
- Nickname(s): Aussie Sharks
- Association: Water Polo Australia
- Confederation: OSA (Oceania)
- Head coach: Timothy Hamill
- Asst coach: Dean Semmens; Andrew Yanitsas
- Captain: Nathan Power

FINA ranking (since 2008)
- Current: 11 (as of 9 August 2021)
- Highest: 7 (2012)
- Lowest: 11 (2016, 2021)

Olympic Games (team statistics)
- Appearances: 18 (first in 1948)
- Best result: 5th place (1984, 1992)

World Championship
- Appearances: 22 (first in 1973)
- Best result: 4th place (1998)

World Cup
- Appearances: 10 (first in 1981)
- Best result: (silver) (2018)

World League
- Appearances: 17 (first in 2003)
- Best result: (bronze) (2007, 2008, 2019)

Commonwealth Championship
- Appearances: 3 (first in 1950)
- Best result: (gold) (1950, 2006)

Media
- Website: waterpoloaustralia.com.au

The Australian national water polo team represents Australia in men's international water polo competitions and is controlled by Water Polo Australia. The national men's team has the nickname of "The Sharks". It is organised into the Asia/Oceania regional group.

== History ==
Australia has competed internationally since the 1948 London Olympic Games, and has qualified for all subsequent Olympic tournaments except Atlanta in 1996, and although not achieving the success of European teams, has remained relatively competitive at international level since.

In 1968, the team qualified to compete at the Mexico Olympic Games, but was denied entry by the Australian Olympic Federation.

Australia scored their first point in Olympic competition when they drew with Bulgaria in the 1972 Summer Olympics in Munich.

The Australian team placed 5th in the 1984 Summer Olympics in Los Angeles, and in the 1992 Summer Olympics in Barcelona, the highest Olympic placing so far, and finished 4th in the World Championships at home in Perth in 1998.

Australia's best international water polo success came in 1996, when the Sharks won the six-nation Control Cup in Hungary, and followed it up with a bronze medal at an eight nation tournament in Italy in the same year. However, they failed to qualify for that year's Olympics for the first time since 1948.

A reinvigorated youthful team managed to finish second to Canada in an international tournament in England in 2002, and in 2003, they beat then world champions Serbia 12–11 in a FINA Water Polo World League match in Hungary, and followed it up by beating Croatia 10–6 at the 2003 Water polo world championship in Barcelona, Spain.

Australia finished 2nd at the 2018 World Cup in Berlin, Germany.

At the 2020 Summer Olympics, Australia surprisingly beat former champion Croatia. Yet, the Australians were not to able progress through to the quarter finals, but still managed to clinch two wins out of their five games.

== Tournament history ==
A red box around the year indicates tournaments played within Australia

=== Olympic Games ===
Olympic Games record
| Year | Round | Position | Pld | W | D | L |
|---|---|---|---|---|---|---|
| (France) 1900 | did not participate | | | | | |
| (United States) 1904 | did not participate | | | | | |
| (United Kingdom) 1908 | did not participate | | | | | |
| (Sweden) 1912 | did not participate | | | | | |
| (Belgium) 1920 | did not participate | | | | | |
| (France) 1924 | did not participate | | | | | |
| (Netherlands) 1928 | did not participate | | | | | |
| (United States) 1932 | did not participate | | | | | |
| (Germany) 1936 | did not participate | | | | | |
| (United Kingdom) 1948 | Group stages | 17th | 2 | 0 | 0 | 2 |
| (Finland) 1952 | Group stages | 17th | 2 | 0 | 0 | 2 |
| (Australia) 1956 | Group stages | 9th | 6 | 1 | 0 | 5 |
| (Italy) 1960 | Group stages | 15th | 3 | 0 | 0 | 3 |
| (Japan) 1964 | Group stages | 12th | 2 | 0 | 0 | 2 |
| (Mexico) 1968 | qualified but did not compete | | | | | |
| (Germany) 1972 | Group stages | 12th | 9 | 0 | 2 | 7 |
| (Canada) 1976 | Group stages | 11th | 8 | 1 | 1 | 6 |
| (Soviet Union) 1980 | Group stages | 7th | 8 | 5 | 1 | 2 |
| (United States) 1984 | Final Group stages | 5th | 8 | 2 | 2 | 4 |
| (South Korea) 1988 | Group stages | 8th | 8 | 3 | 0 | 5 |
| (Spain) 1992 | Group stages | 5th | 8 | 4 | 2 | 2 |
| (United States) 1996 | did not qualify | | | | | |
| (Australia) 2000 | Group stages | 8th | 8 | 1 | 2 | 5 |
| (Greece) 2004 | Group stages | 9th | 8 | 3 | 1 | 4 |
| (China) 2008 | Group stages | 8th | 7 | 3 | 1 | 3 |
| (United Kingdom) 2012 | Quarter-finals | 7th | 8 | 3 | 0 | 5 |
| (Brazil) 2016 | Group stage | 9th | 5 | 2 | 1 | 2 |
| (Japan) 2020 | Group stage | 9th | 5 | 2 | 0 | 3 |
| (France) 2024 | Quarterfinals | 8th | 8 | 3 | 1 | 4 |
| Total | 0 Titles | 18/28 | 113 | 33 | 14 | 66 |

=== World Championship ===
- 1973 – 14th place
- 1975 – 11th place
- 1978 – 9th place
- 1982 – 11th place
- 1986 – 10th place
- 1991 – 8th place
- 1994 – 10th place
- 1998 – 4th place
- 2001 – 10th place
- 2003 – 7th place
- 2005 – 10th place
- 2007 – 10th place
- 2009 – 10th place
- 2011 – 9th place
- 2013 – 8th place
- 2015 – 8th place
- 2017 – 7th place
- 2019 – 6th place
- 2022 – 11th place
- 2023 – 10th place
- 2024 – 11th place
- 2025 – 13th place

=== World Cup ===
- 1981 – 7th place
- 1985 – 7th place
- 1989 – 7th place
- 1991 – 7th place
- 1993 – (bronze) Bronze medal
- 1999 – 8th place
- 2010 – 6th place
- 2014 – 5th place
- 2018 – (silver) Silver medal
- 2026 – 4th place

=== World League ===
- 2003 – 7th place
- 2004 – 7th place
- 2005 – 11th place
- 2006 – 4th place
- 2007 – (bronze) Bronze medal
- 2008 – (bronze) Bronze medal
- 2009 – 6th place
- 2010 – 4th place
- 2011 – 6th place
- 2012 – 7th place
- 2014 – 4th place
- 2015 – 5th place
- 2016 – 5th place
- 2017 – 7th place
- 2018 – 6th place
- 2019 – (bronze) Bronze medal
- 2022 – 7th place

=== Commonwealth Championship ===
- 1950 – (gold) Gold medal
- 2002 – (silver) Silver medal
- 2006 – (gold) Gold medal
- 2014 – did not participate

== Team ==
=== Current squad ===
Roster for the 2025 World Championships.

Head coach: Timothy Hamill

- 1 Nick Porter GK
- 2 Angus Lambie FP
- 3 Miloš Maksimović FP
- 4 Charlie Negus FP
- 5 Nathan Power FP
- 6 Timothy Putt FP
- 7 Luka Krstic FP
- 8 Jacob Mercep FP
- 9 Matthew Byrnes FP
- 10 Marcus Berehulak FP
- 11 Sam Nangle FP
- 12 Tristan Glanznig FP
- 13 Laurence Barker GK
- 14 Andrej Grgurevic FP
- 15 Drew McJannett FP

=== Notable players ===
- Pietro Figlioli, 7x LEN Champions League winner
- Tom Hoad AM
- Thomas Whalan
- Nathan Thomas
- Aaron Younger, 4x LEN Champions League winner

== See also ==
- Australia men's Olympic water polo team records and statistics
- Australia women's national water polo team
