= South Africa men's national water polo team =

Men's national water polo team representing South Africa

South Africa
- FINA code: RSA
- Nickname(s): Black Mamba
- Association: Swimming South Africa
- Confederation: CANA (Africa)
- Head coach: Grant MacKenzie
- Asst coach: Thabang Madi; Khanyisa Mpumlwana
- Captain: Dylan Watt

FINA ranking (since 2008)
- Current: 15 (as of 9 August 2021)
- Highest: 15 (2021)

Biggest win
- South Africa 60–0 Libya (Casablanca, Morocco; 24 May 2009)

Biggest defeat
- Spain 28–2 South Africa (Budapest, Hungary; 23 June 2022)

Olympic Games
- Appearances: 2 (first in 1952)
- Best result: 9th place (1960)

World Championship
- Appearances: 14 (first in 1994)
- Best result: 12th place (2015, 2019, 2022)

World Cup
- Appearances: 2 (first in 2014)
- Best result: 8th place (2014, 2018)

World League
- Appearances: 2 (first in 2009)
- Best result: 8th place (2009, 2010)

Commonwealth Championship
- Appearances: 3 (first in 2002)
- Best result: 4th place (2006, 2014)

Media
- Website: swimsa.org
- Last updated: 1 May 2020

The South Africa men's national water polo team is the representative for South Africa in international men's water polo.

The team has competed in the Olympics three times; in 1952, 1960 and 2020. The team also qualified for the 2024 Olympics, but was controversially withdrawn by Swimming South Africa for not being realistic medal contenders.

== Results ==
=== Olympic Games ===
- 1952 – 14th place
- 1960 – 9th place
- 2020 – 12th place
- 2024 – Withdrew

=== World Championship ===
- 1994 – 15th place
- 1998 – 14th place
- 2005 – 15th place
- 2007 – 14th place
- 2009 – 15th place
- 2011 – 16th place
- 2013 – 15th place
- 2015 – 12th place
- 2017 – 16th place
- 2019 – 12th place
- 2022 – 12th place
- 2023 – 16th place
- 2024 – 15th place
- 2025 – 16th place

=== World Cup ===
- 2014 – 8th place
- 2018 – 8th place

=== World League ===
- 2009 – 8th place
- 2010 – 8th place

=== Commonwealth Championship ===
- 2002 – 7th place
- 2006 – 4th place
- 2014 – 4th place

== Current squad ==
Roster for the 2025 World Championships.

Head coach: Grant MacKenzie

- 1 Luka Rajak GK
- 2 Nathan Ward FP
- 3 Manqoba Bungane FP
- 4 Dean Sneddon FP
- 5 Calvin Kuperus FP
- 6 Carl Germishuys FP
- 7 Dylan Watt FP
- 8 Ryan Sneddon FP
- 9 Matthew Bowers FP
- 10 Corbett-Charles Strydom FP
- 11 Matthew Neser FP
- 12 Tristan Grimmett FP
- 13 Matthew Smith GK
- 14 Brett Sneddon FP
