= 2022 FINA Men's Water Polo World League =

- League: FINA Water Polo World League
- Sport: Water polo
- Duration: 8 January – 27 July 2022
- Games: 66
- Teams: 18

Super Final
- Finals champions: Italy (1st title)
- Runners-up: United States
- Finals MVP: (Italy) Giacomo Cannella

FINA Men's Water Polo World League seasons
- ← 2020 2023 (World Cup) →

The 2022 FINA Men's Water Polo World League was the 20th edition of the annual men's international water polo tournament.

Italy won the title for the first time after a win over the United States.

== European qualification round ==
The draw for the European qualification round was conducted in Lausanne, Switzerland on 17 November 2021.

=== First round ===
Each team played one home and one away game. After the group stage, the top two teams from each group advanced to the second round.

==== Group A ====
Pos	Team	Pld	W	OTW	OTL	L	GF	GA	GD	Pts	Qualification	Hungary	Montenegro	Romania
1	Hungary	2	2	0	0	0	30	20	+10	6	Second round	—	14–9	—
2	Montenegro	2	0	0	0	2	20	30	−10	0	Second round	11–16	—	—
3	Romania	0	0	0	0	0	0	0	0	0	Withdrawn	—	—	—

Source: FINA

==== Group B ====
Pos	Team	Pld	W	OTW	OTL	L	GF	GA	GD	Pts	Qualification	France	Spain	Germany
1	France	2	2	0	0	0	30	22	+8	6	Second round	—	14–11	—
2	Spain	2	1	0	0	1	27	21	+6	3	Second round	—	—	16–7
3	Germany	2	0	0	0	2	18	32	−14	0		11–16	—	—

Source: FINA

==== Group C ====
Pos	Team	Pld	W	OTW	OTL	L	GF	GA	GD	Pts	Qualification	Serbia	Italy	Slovakia
1	Serbia	2	2	0	0	0	30	18	+12	6	Second round	—	12–9	—
2	Italy	2	1	0	0	1	31	15	+16	3	Second round	—	—	22–3
3	Slovakia	2	0	0	0	2	12	40	−28	0		9–18	—	—

Source: FINA

==== Group D ====
Pos	Team	Pld	W	OTW	OTL	L	GF	GA	GD	Pts	Qualification	Croatia	Greece	Russia
1	Croatia	2	2	0	0	0	23	20	+3	6	Second round	—	—	11–9
2	Greece	1	0	0	0	1	11	12	−1	0	Second round	11–12	—	—
3	Russia (Note: Russia was excluded due to the 2022 Russian invasion of Ukraine.)	1	0	0	0	1	9	11	−2	0	Excluded	—	—	—

Source: FINA

=== Second round ===
- 28–30 April 2022, Podgorica, Montenegro

The top three teams, alongside host France, played at the World League Super Final.

Quarter-finals
28 April 2022
Croatia	6
Italy	8
28 April 2022
France	10
Montenegro	11
28 April 2022
Hungary	9
Spain	10
28 April 2022
Serbia	13
Greece	6

Semi-finals
29 April 2022
Italy	9
Montenegro	7
29 April 2022
Spain	10
Serbia	11

Final
30 April 2022
Italy	9
Serbia	12
Third place
30 April 2022
Montenegro	10
Spain	15

5th–8th place bracket

5th–8th place semifinals
29 April 2022
Croatia	13
France	12
29 April 2022
Hungary	14
Greece	13

Fifth place game
30 April 2022
Croatia	9
Hungary	14
Seventh place game
30 April 2022
France	12
Greece	18

=== Final ranking ===
Qualified to the Super Final

Rank	Team
Gold medal	Serbia
Silver medal	Italy
Bronze medal	Spain
4	Montenegro
5	Hungary
6	Croatia
7	Greece
8	France

== Intercontinental Cup ==
- 7–13 March 2022, Lima, Peru

=== Group stage ===
Pos	Team	Pld	W	OTW	OTL	L	GF	GA	GD	Pts	Qualification	Australia	United States	Canada	Brazil	Argentina	Colombia
1	Australia	5	4	0	1	0	70	48	+22	13	Qualified to the Super Final	—	—	18–19^{Pen.}	—	14–5	16–4
2	United States	5	4	0	0	1	69	45	+24	12	Qualified to the Super Final	11–12	—	—	14–9	—	—
3	Canada	5	2	2	0	1	70	59	+11	10	Qualified to the Super Final	—	9–10	—	11–10	17–16^{Pen.}	—
4	Brazil	5	2	0	0	3	61	51	+10	6	Qualified to the Super Final	9–10	—	—	—	12–11	21–5
5	Argentina	5	1	0	1	3	58	60	−2	4		—	7–13	—	—	—	19–4
6	Colombia	5	0	0	0	5	26	91	−65	0		—	8–21	5–14	—	—	—

Source: FINA

=== Knockout stage ===
Semi-finals
12 March
Australia	11
Brazil	6
12 March
United States	10
Canada	9

Final
13 March
Australia	6
United States	7
Third place
13 March
Brazil	11
Canada	8

Classification

Fifth place game
12 March
Argentina	15
Colombia	8

== Super Final ==
2022 FINA Men's Water Polo World League
Tournament details
- Host country: France
- Venue: 1 (in 1 host city)
- Dates: 22–27 July
- Teams: 8 (from 3 confederations)

Final positions
- Champions: Italy (1st title)
- Runners-up: United States
- Third place: Spain
- Fourth place: France

Tournament statistics
- Matches played: 24
- Goals scored: 517 (21.54 per match)
- Top scorers: (Italy) Giacomo Cannella (16 goals)

Awards
- Best player: (Italy) Giacomo Cannella
- Best goalkeeper: (France) Hugo Fontani

=== Teams ===
As host country

- France

Qualified teams

- Australia
- ~~Brazil~~
- Canada
- Italy
- Serbia
- Spain
- United States

Invited teams

- Montenegro

=== Preliminary round ===
==== Group A ====
Pos	Team	Pld	W	OTW	OTL	L	GF	GA	GD	Pts
1	Spain	3	2	1	0	0	41	33	+8	8
2	Montenegro (Note: Montenegro replaced Brazil, who withdrew.)	3	1	0	1	1	32	25	+7	4
3	Serbia	3	1	0	0	2	37	43	−6	3
4	Australia	3	1	0	0	2	26	35	−9	3

Source: FINA
Rules for classification: 1) points; 2) head-to-head points; 3) head-to-head goal difference; 4) head-to-head number of goals scored; 5) goal difference.
Notes:

22 July 2022; 16:00	Report	Australia	10–13	Spain	Piscine de la Kibitzenau, Strasbourg; Referees: Darren Spiritosanto (USA), Alessandro Severo (ITA)
22 July 2022; 16:00	Report	Score by quarters: 2–3, 3–4, 2–4, 3–2			Piscine de la Kibitzenau, Strasbourg; Referees: Darren Spiritosanto (USA), Alessandro Severo (ITA)
22 July 2022; 16:00	Report	Byrnes, Edwards 3	Goals	Barroso Macarro 4	Piscine de la Kibitzenau, Strasbourg; Referees: Darren Spiritosanto (USA), Alessandro Severo (ITA)

22 July 2022; 18:00	Report	Serbia	8–16	Montenegro	Piscine de la Kibitzenau, Strasbourg; Referees: Nenad Periš (CRO), Sébastien Dervieux (FRA)
22 July 2022; 18:00	Report	Score by quarters: 3–3, 0–5, 3–3, 2–5			Piscine de la Kibitzenau, Strasbourg; Referees: Nenad Periš (CRO), Sébastien Dervieux (FRA)
22 July 2022; 18:00	Report	Martinović, Stojanović 2	Goals	Mršić 6	Piscine de la Kibitzenau, Strasbourg; Referees: Nenad Periš (CRO), Sébastien Dervieux (FRA)

23 July 2022; 14:00	Report	Australia	9–8	Montenegro	Piscine de la Kibitzenau, Strasbourg; Referees: Nenad Periš (CRO), Hélène Painchaud (CAN)
23 July 2022; 14:00	Report	Score by quarters: 2–2, 1–1, 3–4, 3–1			Piscine de la Kibitzenau, Strasbourg; Referees: Nenad Periš (CRO), Hélène Painchaud (CAN)
23 July 2022; 14:00	Report	Pavillard 5	Goals	Averka 2	Piscine de la Kibitzenau, Strasbourg; Referees: Nenad Periš (CRO), Hélène Painchaud (CAN)

23 July 2022; 16:00	Report	Serbia	15–20	Spain	Piscine de la Kibitzenau, Strasbourg; Referees: Alessandro Severo (ITA), Sébastien Dervieux (FRA)
23 July 2022; 16:00	Report	Score by quarters: 5–4, 5–5, 4–5, 1–6			Piscine de la Kibitzenau, Strasbourg; Referees: Alessandro Severo (ITA), Sébastien Dervieux (FRA)
23 July 2022; 16:00	Report	Vučinić 5	Goals	four players 3	Piscine de la Kibitzenau, Strasbourg; Referees: Alessandro Severo (ITA), Sébastien Dervieux (FRA)

24 July 2022; 16:00	Report	Serbia	14–7	Australia	Piscine de la Kibitzenau, Strasbourg; Referees: Alessandro Severo (ITA), Diana Dutilh-Dumas (NED)
24 July 2022; 16:00	Report	Score by quarters: 4–3, 3–1, 2–3, 5–0			Piscine de la Kibitzenau, Strasbourg; Referees: Alessandro Severo (ITA), Diana Dutilh-Dumas (NED)
24 July 2022; 16:00	Report	Subotić 4	Goals	Edwards 3	Piscine de la Kibitzenau, Strasbourg; Referees: Alessandro Severo (ITA), Diana Dutilh-Dumas (NED)

24 July 2022; 18:00	Report	Montenegro	10–12 (PSO)	Spain	Piscine de la Kibitzenau, Strasbourg; Referees: Darren Spiritosanto (USA), Hélène Painchaud (CAN)
24 July 2022; 18:00	Report	Score by quarters: 2–1, 4–1, 2–3, 0–3 PSO: 2–4			Piscine de la Kibitzenau, Strasbourg; Referees: Darren Spiritosanto (USA), Hélène Painchaud (CAN)
24 July 2022; 18:00	Report	Radović 3	Goals	Barroso Macarro, Cabañas 2	Piscine de la Kibitzenau, Strasbourg; Referees: Darren Spiritosanto (USA), Hélène Painchaud (CAN)

==== Group B ====
Pos	Team	Pld	W	OTW	OTL	L	GF	GA	GD	Pts
1	United States	3	2	0	1	0	42	36	+6	7
2	Italy	3	2	0	0	1	35	26	+9	6
3	France (H)	3	1	1	0	1	34	31	+3	5
4	Canada	3	0	0	0	3	26	44	−18	0

Source: FINA
Rules for classification: 1) points; 2) head-to-head points; 3) head-to-head goal difference; 4) head-to-head number of goals scored; 5) goal difference.
(H) Host

22 July 2022; 14:00	Report	Italy	17–5	Canada	Piscine de la Kibitzenau, Strasbourg; Referees: Stanko Ivanovski (MNE), Diana Dutilh-Dumas (NED)
22 July 2022; 14:00	Report	Score by quarters: 3–1, 5–2, 4–0, 5–2			Piscine de la Kibitzenau, Strasbourg; Referees: Stanko Ivanovski (MNE), Diana Dutilh-Dumas (NED)
22 July 2022; 14:00	Report	Di Somma 5	Goals	D'Souza 2	Piscine de la Kibitzenau, Strasbourg; Referees: Stanko Ivanovski (MNE), Diana Dutilh-Dumas (NED)

22 July 2022; 20:00	Report	United States	17–19 (PSO)	France	Piscine de la Kibitzenau, Strasbourg; Referees: Vojin Putniković (SRB), Daniel Flahive (AUS)
22 July 2022; 20:00	Report	Score by quarters: 4–3, 3–5, 2–2, 5–4 PSO: 3–5			Piscine de la Kibitzenau, Strasbourg; Referees: Vojin Putniković (SRB), Daniel Flahive (AUS)
22 July 2022; 20:00	Report	Hallock 4	Goals	Vernoux 4	Piscine de la Kibitzenau, Strasbourg; Referees: Vojin Putniković (SRB), Daniel Flahive (AUS)

23 July 2022; 18:00	Report	United States	15–13	Canada	Piscine de la Kibitzenau, Strasbourg; Referees: Jaume Teixidó (ESP), Vojin Putniković (SRB)
23 July 2022; 18:00	Report	Score by quarters: 6–3, 4–1, 3–4, 2–5			Piscine de la Kibitzenau, Strasbourg; Referees: Jaume Teixidó (ESP), Vojin Putniković (SRB)
23 July 2022; 18:00	Report	Dodd, Irving 3	Goals	D'Souza 4	Piscine de la Kibitzenau, Strasbourg; Referees: Jaume Teixidó (ESP), Vojin Putniković (SRB)

23 July 2022; 20:00	Report	Italy	9–8	France	Piscine de la Kibitzenau, Strasbourg; Referees: Stanko Ivanovski (MNE), Daniel Flahive (AUS)
23 July 2022; 20:00	Report	Score by quarters: 2–2, 3–3, 3–2, 1–1			Piscine de la Kibitzenau, Strasbourg; Referees: Stanko Ivanovski (MNE), Daniel Flahive (AUS)
23 July 2022; 20:00	Report	Cannella 4	Goals	eight players 1	Piscine de la Kibitzenau, Strasbourg; Referees: Stanko Ivanovski (MNE), Daniel Flahive (AUS)

24 July 2022; 14:00	Report	Italy	9–13	United States	Piscine de la Kibitzenau, Strasbourg; Referees: Nenad Periš (CRO), Jaume Teixidó (ESP)
24 July 2022; 14:00	Report	Score by quarters: 2–3, 2–4, 2–5, 3–1			Piscine de la Kibitzenau, Strasbourg; Referees: Nenad Periš (CRO), Jaume Teixidó (ESP)
24 July 2022; 14:00	Report	three players 2	Goals	Stevenson 3	Piscine de la Kibitzenau, Strasbourg; Referees: Nenad Periš (CRO), Jaume Teixidó (ESP)

24 July 2022; 20:00	Report	Canada	8–12	France	Piscine de la Kibitzenau, Strasbourg; Referees: Vojin Putniković (SRB), Stanko Ivanovski (MNE)
24 July 2022; 20:00	Report	Score by quarters: 3–3, 1–2, 3–3, 1–4			Piscine de la Kibitzenau, Strasbourg; Referees: Vojin Putniković (SRB), Stanko Ivanovski (MNE)
24 July 2022; 20:00	Report	Djerkovic, Gardijan 2	Goals	Vernoux 3	Piscine de la Kibitzenau, Strasbourg; Referees: Vojin Putniković (SRB), Stanko Ivanovski (MNE)

=== Knockout stage ===
==== Bracket ====
Quarter-finals
25 July
Spain	13
Canada	6
25 July
Italy	14
Serbia	7
25 July
Montenegro	9
France	12
25 July
United States	12
Australia	11

Semi-finals
26 July
Spain	8
Italy	9
26 July
France	15
United States	16

Final
27 July
Italy	13
United States	9
Third place
27 July
Spain	11
France	8

==== Quarterfinals ====
25 July 2022; 14:00	Report	Serbia	7–14	Italy	Piscine de la Kibitzenau, Strasbourg; Referees: Daniel Flahive (AUS), Darren Spiritosanto (USA)
25 July 2022; 14:00	Report	Score by quarters: 2–3, 2–3, 2–4, 1–4			Piscine de la Kibitzenau, Strasbourg; Referees: Daniel Flahive (AUS), Darren Spiritosanto (USA)
25 July 2022; 14:00	Report	Subotić 2	Goals	Damonte, Di Somma 3	Piscine de la Kibitzenau, Strasbourg; Referees: Daniel Flahive (AUS), Darren Spiritosanto (USA)

25 July 2022; 16:00	Report	Spain	13–6	Canada	Piscine de la Kibitzenau, Strasbourg; Referees: Sébastien Dervieux (FRA), Diana Dutilh-Dumas (NED)
25 July 2022; 16:00	Report	Score by quarters: 1–2, 3–3, 4–0, 5–1			Piscine de la Kibitzenau, Strasbourg; Referees: Sébastien Dervieux (FRA), Diana Dutilh-Dumas (NED)
25 July 2022; 16:00	Report	Barroso Macarro, Paul García 3	Goals	Gardijan, Halajian 2	Piscine de la Kibitzenau, Strasbourg; Referees: Sébastien Dervieux (FRA), Diana Dutilh-Dumas (NED)

25 July 2022; 18:00	Report	Australia	11–12	United States	Piscine de la Kibitzenau, Strasbourg; Referees: Jaume Teixidó (ESP), Hélène Painchaud (CAN)
25 July 2022; 18:00	Report	Score by quarters: 2–1, 2–4, 5–4, 2–3			Piscine de la Kibitzenau, Strasbourg; Referees: Jaume Teixidó (ESP), Hélène Painchaud (CAN)
25 July 2022; 18:00	Report	Pavillard 5	Goals	Irving 3	Piscine de la Kibitzenau, Strasbourg; Referees: Jaume Teixidó (ESP), Hélène Painchaud (CAN)

25 July 2022; 20:00	Report	Montenegro	9–12	France	Piscine de la Kibitzenau, Strasbourg; Referees: Nenad Periš (CRO), Alessandro Severo (ITA)
25 July 2022; 20:00	Report	Score by quarters: 3–1, 2–4, 1–4, 3–3			Piscine de la Kibitzenau, Strasbourg; Referees: Nenad Periš (CRO), Alessandro Severo (ITA)
25 July 2022; 20:00	Report	Mršić 3	Goals	three players 3	Piscine de la Kibitzenau, Strasbourg; Referees: Nenad Periš (CRO), Alessandro Severo (ITA)

==== 5th–8th place bracket ====
5th–8th place semifinals
26 July
Canada	4
Serbia	12
26 July
Montenegro	9
Australia	6

Fifth place game
27 July
Serbia	8
Montenegro	6
Seventh place game
27 July
Canada	9
Australia	13

===== 5–8th place semifinals =====
26 July 2022; 14:00	Report	Montenegro	9–6	Australia	Piscine de la Kibitzenau, Strasbourg; Referees: Darren Spiritosanto (USA), Jaume Teixidó (ESP)
26 July 2022; 14:00	Report	Score by quarters: 2–2, 3–2, 1–1, 3–1			Piscine de la Kibitzenau, Strasbourg; Referees: Darren Spiritosanto (USA), Jaume Teixidó (ESP)
26 July 2022; 14:00	Report	Averka 4	Goals	six players 1	Piscine de la Kibitzenau, Strasbourg; Referees: Darren Spiritosanto (USA), Jaume Teixidó (ESP)

26 July 2022; 16:00	Report	Serbia	12–4	Canada	Piscine de la Kibitzenau, Strasbourg; Referees: Sébastien Dervieux (FRA), Alessandro Severo (ITA)
26 July 2022; 16:00	Report	Score by quarters: 2–0, 3–1, 5–2, 2–1			Piscine de la Kibitzenau, Strasbourg; Referees: Sébastien Dervieux (FRA), Alessandro Severo (ITA)
26 July 2022; 16:00	Report	Martinović, Stojanović 3	Goals	Cote 3	Piscine de la Kibitzenau, Strasbourg; Referees: Sébastien Dervieux (FRA), Alessandro Severo (ITA)

===== Seventh place game =====
27 July 2022; 14:00	Report	Australia	13–9	Canada	Piscine de la Kibitzenau, Strasbourg; Referees: Vojin Putniković (SRB), Stanko Ivanovski (MNE)
27 July 2022; 14:00	Report	Score by quarters: 3–1, 1–2, 6–3, 3–3			Piscine de la Kibitzenau, Strasbourg; Referees: Vojin Putniković (SRB), Stanko Ivanovski (MNE)
27 July 2022; 14:00	Report	Negus 4	Goals	D'Souza 4	Piscine de la Kibitzenau, Strasbourg; Referees: Vojin Putniković (SRB), Stanko Ivanovski (MNE)

===== Fifth place game =====
27 July 2022; 16:00	Report	Montenegro	6–8	Serbia	Piscine de la Kibitzenau, Strasbourg; Referees: Sébastien Dervieux (FRA), Hélène Painchaud (CAN)
27 July 2022; 16:00	Report	Score by quarters: 0–2, 2–1, 1–2, 3–3			Piscine de la Kibitzenau, Strasbourg; Referees: Sébastien Dervieux (FRA), Hélène Painchaud (CAN)
27 July 2022; 16:00	Report	Matković 3	Goals	Vučinić 3	Piscine de la Kibitzenau, Strasbourg; Referees: Sébastien Dervieux (FRA), Hélène Painchaud (CAN)

==== Semifinals ====
26 July 2022; 18:00	Report	Italy	9–8	Spain	Piscine de la Kibitzenau, Strasbourg; Referees: Nenad Periš (CRO), Diana Dutilh-Dumas (NED)
26 July 2022; 18:00	Report	Score by quarters: 2–2, 3–1, 2–2, 2–3			Piscine de la Kibitzenau, Strasbourg; Referees: Nenad Periš (CRO), Diana Dutilh-Dumas (NED)
26 July 2022; 18:00	Report	Cannella 3	Goals	García, Sanahuja 2	Piscine de la Kibitzenau, Strasbourg; Referees: Nenad Periš (CRO), Diana Dutilh-Dumas (NED)

26 July 2022; 20:00	Report	France	15–16	United States	Piscine de la Kibitzenau, Strasbourg; Referees: Vojin Putniković (SRB), Daniel Flahive (AUS)
26 July 2022; 20:00	Report	Score by quarters: 2–5, 5–4, 3–4, 5–3			Piscine de la Kibitzenau, Strasbourg; Referees: Vojin Putniković (SRB), Daniel Flahive (AUS)
26 July 2022; 20:00	Report	Marzouki 4	Goals	Irving 5	Piscine de la Kibitzenau, Strasbourg; Referees: Vojin Putniković (SRB), Daniel Flahive (AUS)

==== Third place game ====
27 July 2022; 18:00	Report	France	8–11	Spain	Piscine de la Kibitzenau, Strasbourg; Referees: Darren Spiritosanto (USA), Alessandro Severo (ITA)
27 July 2022; 18:00	Report	Score by quarters: 3–3, 1–2, 2–4, 2–2			Piscine de la Kibitzenau, Strasbourg; Referees: Darren Spiritosanto (USA), Alessandro Severo (ITA)
27 July 2022; 18:00	Report	three players 2	Goals	Tahull 3	Piscine de la Kibitzenau, Strasbourg; Referees: Darren Spiritosanto (USA), Alessandro Severo (ITA)

==== Final ====
27 July 2022; 20:00	Report	United States	9–13	Italy	Piscine de la Kibitzenau, Strasbourg; Referees: Nenad Periš (CRO), Diana Dutilh-Dumas (NED)
27 July 2022; 20:00	Report	Score by quarters: 2–1, 2–3, 1–6, 4–3			Piscine de la Kibitzenau, Strasbourg; Referees: Nenad Periš (CRO), Diana Dutilh-Dumas (NED)
27 July 2022; 20:00	Report	Bowen 4	Goals	three players 3	Piscine de la Kibitzenau, Strasbourg; Referees: Nenad Periš (CRO), Diana Dutilh-Dumas (NED)

=== Final ranking ===
Rank	Team
1	Italy
2	United States
3	Spain
4	France
5	Serbia
6	Montenegro
7	Australia
8	Canada
