= Water polo at the 2013 World Aquatics Championships – Men's tournament =

15th edition of the FINA Men's Water Polo World Cup

Tournament details
- Venue: Spain (in Barcelona host cities)
- Dates: 22 July – 3 August
- Teams: 16 (from 5 confederations)

Final positions
- Champions: Hungary (3rd title)
- Runners-up: Montenegro
- Third place: Croatia
- Fourth place: Italy

Tournament statistics
- Matches played: 44
- Goals scored: 777 (17.66 per match)
- Attendance: 55,790 (1,268 per match)
- Top scorers: (Croatia) Sandro Sukno (Montenegro) Aleksandar Ivović (20 goals)

Awards
- Best player: (Hungary) Dénes Varga

The men's water polo tournament at the 2013 World Aquatics Championships, organised by the FINA, was held in the Piscines Bernat Picornell in Barcelona, Spain from 23 July to 3 August 2013.

Hungary won their third title by defeating Montenegro 8–7 in the final match.

== Qualification ==
16 teams qualified for the world championships in 2013 as follows:

- The host nation
- The best 2 teams in the 2012 World League not already qualified as the host nation
- The best 4 teams in the 2012 Olympics not already qualified as the host nation or from the World League
- The best 3 teams in the 2012 European Championships not already qualified as the host nation, from the World League, or from the Olympics
- The best 2 teams in the 2013 Americas Qualification Tournament not already qualified as the host nation, from the World League, or from the Olympics
- The best 2 teams from Asia (qualification system yet to be organised) not already qualified as the host nation, from the World League, or from the Olympics
- The best team from Africa (qualification system yet to be organised) not already qualified as the host nation, from the World League, or from the Olympics
- The best team from Oceania (qualification system yet to be organised) not already qualified as the host nation, from the World League, or from the Olympics
- If no team enters from a continent or if a team qualified as the host nation, from the World League, or from the Olympics does not enter, then each vacancy shall be filled by the next highest placed team(s) from the continental qualification tournament with the following rotation: Americas, Europe, Host Continent (Europe), Asia, Oceania and Africa.

Event	Date	Location	Vacancies	Qualified
Host nation	–	–	1	Spain
2012 World League Finals	12–17 June 2012	(Kazakhstan) Almaty	2	Croatia; Italy
2012 Olympics	29 July–12 August 2012	(United Kingdom) London	4	Montenegro; Serbia; Hungary; Australia
2012 European Championships	16–29 January 2012	(Netherlands) Eindhoven	3	Germany; Greece; Romania
2013 Americas Qualification Tournament	January 2013	(Canada) Calgary	2	Canada; United States
Asia			2	China; Kazakhstan
Africa			1	South Africa
Oceania			1	New Zealand
TOTAL			16	

=== Groups formed ===
The draw resulted in the following groups:

Group A	Group B	Group C	Group D
Greece	Canada	Australia	Germany
Montenegro	Croatia	China	Italy
New Zealand	South Africa	Hungary	Kazakhstan
Spain	United States	Serbia	Romania

== Preliminary round ==
=== Group A ===
	Pld	W	D	L	GF	GA	GD	Pts
Greece	3	3	0	0	38	15	+23	6
Montenegro	3	2	0	1	34	12	+22	4
Spain	3	1	0	2	30	18	+12	2
New Zealand	3	0	0	3	8	65	−57	0

22 July 2013; 09:30	Match 1	Montenegro	4–6	Greece	Piscines Bernat Picornell, Barcelona; Attendance: 300; Referees: Alexandrescu (ROU), Naumov (RUS)
22 July 2013; 09:30	Match 1	Score by quarters: 0–0, 0–3, 1–2, 3–1			Piscines Bernat Picornell, Barcelona; Attendance: 300; Referees: Alexandrescu (ROU), Naumov (RUS)
22 July 2013; 09:30	Match 1	Ivović 3	Goals	Mylonakis 3	Piscines Bernat Picornell, Barcelona; Attendance: 300; Referees: Alexandrescu (ROU), Naumov (RUS)

22 July 2013; 21:30	Match 8	Spain	18–3	New Zealand	Piscines Bernat Picornell, Barcelona; Attendance: 900; Referees: Balfanbayev (KAZ), Gaber (EGY)
22 July 2013; 21:30	Match 8	Score by quarters: 3–0, 3–1, 7–1, 5–1			Piscines Bernat Picornell, Barcelona; Attendance: 900; Referees: Balfanbayev (KAZ), Gaber (EGY)
22 July 2013; 21:30	Match 8	Perrone 5	Goals	Lui-Fakaotimanava 2	Piscines Bernat Picornell, Barcelona; Attendance: 900; Referees: Balfanbayev (KAZ), Gaber (EGY)

24 July 2013; 20:10	Match 15	New Zealand	4–24	Greece	Piscines Bernat Picornell, Barcelona; Attendance: 1,000; Referees: Reemnet (NED), Gaber (EGY)
24 July 2013; 20:10	Match 15	Score by quarters: 2–5, 1–8, 0–6, 1–4			Piscines Bernat Picornell, Barcelona; Attendance: 1,000; Referees: Reemnet (NED), Gaber (EGY)
24 July 2013; 20:10	Match 15	four players 1	Goals	Fountoulis 6	Piscines Bernat Picornell, Barcelona; Attendance: 1,000; Referees: Reemnet (NED), Gaber (EGY)

24 July 2013; 21:30	Match 16	Montenegro	7–5	Spain	Piscines Bernat Picornell, Barcelona; Attendance: 800; Referees: Vogel (HUN), Alexandrescu (ROU)
24 July 2013; 21:30	Match 16	Score by quarters: 2–3, 2–2, 2–0, 1–0			Piscines Bernat Picornell, Barcelona; Attendance: 800; Referees: Vogel (HUN), Alexandrescu (ROU)
24 July 2013; 21:30	Match 16	Janović 5	Goals	Español 2	Piscines Bernat Picornell, Barcelona; Attendance: 800; Referees: Vogel (HUN), Alexandrescu (ROU)

26 July 2013; 17:30	Match 21	Montenegro	23–1	New Zealand	Piscines Bernat Picornell, Barcelona; Attendance: 550; Referees: Cardenuto (BRA), Gaber (EGY)
26 July 2013; 17:30	Match 21	Score by quarters: 5–0, 8–1, 6–0, 4–0			Piscines Bernat Picornell, Barcelona; Attendance: 550; Referees: Cardenuto (BRA), Gaber (EGY)
26 July 2013; 17:30	Match 21	Ivović 6	Goals	Pye 1	Piscines Bernat Picornell, Barcelona; Attendance: 550; Referees: Cardenuto (BRA), Gaber (EGY)

26 July 2013; 21:30	Match 24	Spain	7–8	Greece	Piscines Bernat Picornell, Barcelona; Attendance: 2,500; Referees: Koryzna (POL), Bianchi (ITA)
26 July 2013; 21:30	Match 24	Score by quarters: 1–1, 0–2, 2–3, 4–2			Piscines Bernat Picornell, Barcelona; Attendance: 2,500; Referees: Koryzna (POL), Bianchi (ITA)
26 July 2013; 21:30	Match 24	Molina, Minguell 3	Goals	Mylonakis 3	Piscines Bernat Picornell, Barcelona; Attendance: 2,500; Referees: Koryzna (POL), Bianchi (ITA)

=== Group B ===
	Pl	W	D	L	GF	GA	GD	Pts
Croatia	3	3	0	0	41	15	+26	6
United States	3	2	0	1	31	19	+12	4
Canada	3	1	0	2	32	32	0	2
South Africa	3	0	0	3	14	52	−38	0

22 July 2013; 10:50	Match 2	Croatia	9–7	United States	Piscines Bernat Picornell, Barcelona; Attendance: 1300; Referees: Bender (GER), Moller (ARG)
22 July 2013; 10:50	Match 2	Score by quarters: 1–1, 2–2, 3–1, 3–3			Piscines Bernat Picornell, Barcelona; Attendance: 1300; Referees: Bender (GER), Moller (ARG)
22 July 2013; 10:50	Match 2	three players 2	Goals	de Trane, Mann 2	Piscines Bernat Picornell, Barcelona; Attendance: 1300; Referees: Bender (GER), Moller (ARG)

22 July 2013; 12:10	Match 3	Canada	17–11	South Africa	Piscines Bernat Picornell, Barcelona; Attendance: 335; Referees: Golijanin (SRB), Rezvani (IRN)
22 July 2013; 12:10	Match 3	Score by quarters: 4–2, 2–3, 7–4, 4–2			Piscines Bernat Picornell, Barcelona; Attendance: 335; Referees: Golijanin (SRB), Rezvani (IRN)
22 July 2013; 12:10	Match 3	Constantin-Bicari 4	Goals	Card, Bell 3	Piscines Bernat Picornell, Barcelona; Attendance: 335; Referees: Golijanin (SRB), Rezvani (IRN)

24 July 2013; 09:30	Match 9	South Africa	3–16	United States	Piscines Bernat Picornell, Barcelona; Attendance: 600; Referees: Balfanbayev (KAZ), Ni (CHN)
24 July 2013; 09:30	Match 9	Score by quarters: 0–4, 1–5, 2–5, 0–2			Piscines Bernat Picornell, Barcelona; Attendance: 600; Referees: Balfanbayev (KAZ), Ni (CHN)
24 July 2013; 09:30	Match 9	Bell 2	Goals	Mann 5	Piscines Bernat Picornell, Barcelona; Attendance: 600; Referees: Balfanbayev (KAZ), Ni (CHN)

24 July 2013; 10:50	Match 10	Croatia	13–8	Canada	Piscines Bernat Picornell, Barcelona; Attendance: 1800; Referees: Koganov (AZE), Rezvani (IRN)
24 July 2013; 10:50	Match 10	Score by quarters: 3–0, 3–3, 4–3, 3–2			Piscines Bernat Picornell, Barcelona; Attendance: 1800; Referees: Koganov (AZE), Rezvani (IRN)
24 July 2013; 10:50	Match 10	Muslim, Sukno 3	Goals	Constantin-Bicari 2	Piscines Bernat Picornell, Barcelona; Attendance: 1800; Referees: Koganov (AZE), Rezvani (IRN)

26 July 2013; 18:50	Match 22	Croatia	19–0	South Africa	Piscines Bernat Picornell, Barcelona; Attendance: 1800; Referees: Ni (CHN), Rezvani (IRN)
26 July 2013; 18:50	Match 22	Score by quarters: 3–0, 4–0, 7–0, 5–0			Piscines Bernat Picornell, Barcelona; Attendance: 1800; Referees: Ni (CHN), Rezvani (IRN)
26 July 2013; 18:50	Match 22	Sukno 5	Goals		Piscines Bernat Picornell, Barcelona; Attendance: 1800; Referees: Ni (CHN), Rezvani (IRN)

26 July 2013; 20:10	Match 23	Canada	7–8	United States	Piscines Bernat Picornell, Barcelona; Attendance: 1,000; Referees: Golijanin (SRB), Flahive (AUS)
26 July 2013; 20:10	Match 23	Score by quarters: 2–2, 0–1, 1–2, 4–3			Piscines Bernat Picornell, Barcelona; Attendance: 1,000; Referees: Golijanin (SRB), Flahive (AUS)
26 July 2013; 20:10	Match 23	McElroy 3	Goals	Bowen 3	Piscines Bernat Picornell, Barcelona; Attendance: 1,000; Referees: Golijanin (SRB), Flahive (AUS)

=== Group C ===
	Pld	W	D	L	GF	GA	GD	Pts
Serbia	3	3	0	0	39	26	+13	6
Hungary	3	1	1	1	32	27	+5	3
Australia	3	1	1	1	25	26	−1	3
China	3	0	0	3	21	38	−17	0

22 July 2013; 13:30	Match 4	Serbia	10–7	Australia	Piscines Bernat Picornell, Barcelona; Attendance: 300; Referees: Borrell (ESP), Stavridis (GRE)
22 July 2013; 13:30	Match 4	Score by quarters: 4–3, 2–0, 1–2, 3–2			Piscines Bernat Picornell, Barcelona; Attendance: 300; Referees: Borrell (ESP), Stavridis (GRE)
22 July 2013; 13:30	Match 4	Udovičić, Pijetlović 3	Goals	seven players 1	Piscines Bernat Picornell, Barcelona; Attendance: 300; Referees: Borrell (ESP), Stavridis (GRE)

22 July 2013; 17:30	Match 5	Hungary	13–5	China	Piscines Bernat Picornell, Barcelona; Attendance: 500; Referees: Margeta (SLO), Mellirar (RSA)
22 July 2013; 17:30	Match 5	Score by quarters: 3–1, 4–1, 3–2, 3–1			Piscines Bernat Picornell, Barcelona; Attendance: 500; Referees: Margeta (SLO), Mellirar (RSA)
22 July 2013; 17:30	Match 5	Szivós 5	Goals	five players 1	Piscines Bernat Picornell, Barcelona; Attendance: 500; Referees: Margeta (SLO), Mellirar (RSA)

24 July 2013; 12:10	Match 11	China	7–9	Australia	Piscines Bernat Picornell, Barcelona; Attendance: 455; Referees: Naumov (RUS), Abramović (MNE)
24 July 2013; 12:10	Match 11	Score by quarters: 1–4, 1–2, 1–2, 4–1			Piscines Bernat Picornell, Barcelona; Attendance: 455; Referees: Naumov (RUS), Abramović (MNE)
24 July 2013; 12:10	Match 11	Zhang Jian 2	Goals	Howden 3	Piscines Bernat Picornell, Barcelona; Attendance: 455; Referees: Naumov (RUS), Abramović (MNE)

24 July 2013; 13:30	Match 12	Serbia	13–10	Hungary	Piscines Bernat Picornell, Barcelona; Attendance: 1,000; Referees: Margeta (SLO), Koryzna (POL)
24 July 2013; 13:30	Match 12	Score by quarters: 2–3, 5–2, 2–2, 4–3			Piscines Bernat Picornell, Barcelona; Attendance: 1,000; Referees: Margeta (SLO), Koryzna (POL)
24 July 2013; 13:30	Match 12	Prlainović, Nikić 3	Goals	Dé. Varga 3	Piscines Bernat Picornell, Barcelona; Attendance: 1,000; Referees: Margeta (SLO), Koryzna (POL)

26 July 2013; 09:30	Match 17	Serbia	16–9	China	Piscines Bernat Picornell, Barcelona; Attendance: 350; Referees: Williams (NZL), Moller (ARG)
26 July 2013; 09:30	Match 17	Score by quarters: 4–3, 4–2, 5–3, 3–1			Piscines Bernat Picornell, Barcelona; Attendance: 350; Referees: Williams (NZL), Moller (ARG)
26 July 2013; 09:30	Match 17	Mitrović 4	Goals	three players 2	Piscines Bernat Picornell, Barcelona; Attendance: 350; Referees: Williams (NZL), Moller (ARG)

26 July 2013; 10:50	Match 18	Hungary	9–9	Australia	Piscines Bernat Picornell, Barcelona; Attendance: 1,100; Referees: Margeta (SLO), Stavridis (GRE)
26 July 2013; 10:50	Match 18	Score by quarters: 3–3, 1–1, 3–3, 2–2			Piscines Bernat Picornell, Barcelona; Attendance: 1,100; Referees: Margeta (SLO), Stavridis (GRE)
26 July 2013; 10:50	Match 18	Vámos 3	Goals	Campbell 5	Piscines Bernat Picornell, Barcelona; Attendance: 1,100; Referees: Margeta (SLO), Stavridis (GRE)

=== Group D ===
	Pld	W	D	L	GF	GA	GD	Pts
Italy	3	3	0	0	32	18	+14	6
Germany	3	2	0	1	26	26	0	4
Kazakhstan	3	1	0	2	21	25	−4	2
Romania	3	0	0	3	16	26	−10	0

22 July 2013; 18:50	Match 6	Italy	10–4	Romania	Piscines Bernat Picornell, Barcelona; Attendance: 600; Referees: Peris (CRO), Koryzna (POL)
22 July 2013; 18:50	Match 6	Score by quarters: 4–1, 1–1, 2–2, 2–0			Piscines Bernat Picornell, Barcelona; Attendance: 600; Referees: Peris (CRO), Koryzna (POL)
22 July 2013; 18:50	Match 6	Aicardi 3	Goals	four players 1	Piscines Bernat Picornell, Barcelona; Attendance: 600; Referees: Peris (CRO), Koryzna (POL)

22 July 2013; 20:10	Match 7	Germany	9–8	Kazakhstan	Piscines Bernat Picornell, Barcelona; Attendance: 800; Referees: Terepenka (CAN), Koganov (AZE)
22 July 2013; 20:10	Match 7	Score by quarters: 3–3, 3–0, 3–1, 0–4			Piscines Bernat Picornell, Barcelona; Attendance: 800; Referees: Terepenka (CAN), Koganov (AZE)
22 July 2013; 20:10	Match 7	Nossek 3	Goals	Ushakov 3	Piscines Bernat Picornell, Barcelona; Attendance: 800; Referees: Terepenka (CAN), Koganov (AZE)

24 July 2013; 17:30	Match 13	Kazakhstan	7–4	Romania	Piscines Bernat Picornell, Barcelona; Attendance: 600; Referees: Peris (CRO), Stavridis (GRE)
24 July 2013; 17:30	Match 13	Score by quarters: 1–0, 2–2, 4–1, 0–1			Piscines Bernat Picornell, Barcelona; Attendance: 600; Referees: Peris (CRO), Stavridis (GRE)
24 July 2013; 17:30	Match 13	Shmider, Medvedev 2	Goals	four players 1	Piscines Bernat Picornell, Barcelona; Attendance: 600; Referees: Peris (CRO), Stavridis (GRE)

24 July 2013; 18:50	Match 14	Italy	10–8	Germany	Piscines Bernat Picornell, Barcelona; Attendance: 600; Referees: Borrell (ESP), Terepenka (CAN)
24 July 2013; 18:50	Match 14	Score by quarters: 3–1, 3–1, 3–3, 1–3			Piscines Bernat Picornell, Barcelona; Attendance: 600; Referees: Borrell (ESP), Terepenka (CAN)
24 July 2013; 18:50	Match 14	three players 2	Goals	Real, Schlotterbeck 2	Piscines Bernat Picornell, Barcelona; Attendance: 600; Referees: Borrell (ESP), Terepenka (CAN)

26 July 2013; 12:10	Match 19	Italy	12–6	Kazakhstan	Piscines Bernat Picornell, Barcelona; Attendance: 700; Referees: Peris (CRO), Abramović (MNE)
26 July 2013; 12:10	Match 19	Score by quarters: 3–0, 3–2, 2–1, 4–3			Piscines Bernat Picornell, Barcelona; Attendance: 700; Referees: Peris (CRO), Abramović (MNE)
26 July 2013; 12:10	Match 19	Figlioli 4	Goals	Koliadenko 2	Piscines Bernat Picornell, Barcelona; Attendance: 700; Referees: Peris (CRO), Abramović (MNE)

26 July 2013; 13:30	Match 20	Germany	9–8	Romania	Piscines Bernat Picornell, Barcelona; Attendance: 800; Referees: Naumov (RUS), Littlejohn (GBR)
26 July 2013; 13:30	Match 20	Score by quarters: 4–3, 3–0, 1–2, 1–3			Piscines Bernat Picornell, Barcelona; Attendance: 800; Referees: Naumov (RUS), Littlejohn (GBR)
26 July 2013; 13:30	Match 20	Schüler, Eidner 3	Goals	three players 2	Piscines Bernat Picornell, Barcelona; Attendance: 800; Referees: Naumov (RUS), Littlejohn (GBR)

== Knockout stage ==
=== Bracket ===
Round of 16
28 July
Greece	13
South Africa	5
28 July
Hungary	16
Kazakhstan	7
28 July
Croatia	21
New Zealand	4
28 July
Germany	4
Australia	8
28 July
Serbia	13
Romania	5
28 July
Montenegro	12
Canada	4
28 July
Italy	11
China	3
28 July
United States	6
Spain	10

Quarter-finals
30 July
Greece	3
Hungary	9
30 July
Croatia	7
Australia	6
30 July
Serbia	8
Montenegro	9
30 July
Italy	4
Spain	3

Semi-finals
1 August
Hungary	11
Croatia	10
1 August
Montenegro	10
Italy	8

Final
3 August
Hungary	8
Montenegro	7
Third place
3 August
Croatia	10
Italy	8

5th place bracket

5th–8th place semifinals
1 August
Greece	11
Australia	9
1 August
Serbia	13
Spain (pen.)	14

Fifth place game
3 August
Greece	8
Spain	10
Seventh place game
3 August
Australia	7
Serbia	13

=== Round of 16 ===
28 July 2013; 09:30	Match 25	Greece	13–5	South Africa	Piscines Bernat Picornell, Barcelona; Attendance: 300; Referees: Abramović (MNE), Cardenuto (BRA)
28 July 2013; 09:30	Match 25	Score by quarters: 3–2, 3–2, 4–0, 3–1			Piscines Bernat Picornell, Barcelona; Attendance: 300; Referees: Abramović (MNE), Cardenuto (BRA)
28 July 2013; 09:30	Match 25	Gounas 3	Goals	five players 1	Piscines Bernat Picornell, Barcelona; Attendance: 300; Referees: Abramović (MNE), Cardenuto (BRA)

28 July 2013; 10:50	Match 26	Montenegro	12–4	Canada	Piscines Bernat Picornell, Barcelona; Attendance: 800; Referees: Balfanbayev (KAZ), Vogel (HUN)
28 July 2013; 10:50	Match 26	Score by quarters: 2–1, 3–0, 3–3, 4–0			Piscines Bernat Picornell, Barcelona; Attendance: 800; Referees: Balfanbayev (KAZ), Vogel (HUN)
28 July 2013; 10:50	Match 26	Ivović 3	Goals	Kudaba 2	Piscines Bernat Picornell, Barcelona; Attendance: 800; Referees: Balfanbayev (KAZ), Vogel (HUN)

28 July 2013; 12:10	Match 27	Croatia	21–4	New Zealand	Piscines Bernat Picornell, Barcelona; Attendance: 1600; Referees: Drury (USA), Melliar (RSA)
28 July 2013; 12:10	Match 27	Score by quarters: 6–1, 4–2, 8–0, 3–1			Piscines Bernat Picornell, Barcelona; Attendance: 1600; Referees: Drury (USA), Melliar (RSA)
28 July 2013; 12:10	Match 27	Muslim, Sukno 5	Goals	four players 1	Piscines Bernat Picornell, Barcelona; Attendance: 1600; Referees: Drury (USA), Melliar (RSA)

28 July 2013; 13:30	Match 28	United States	6–10	Spain	Piscines Bernat Picornell, Barcelona; Attendance: 1,300; Referees: Peris (CRO), Alexandrescu (ROU)
28 July 2013; 13:30	Match 28	Score by quarters: 2–4, 2–1, 1–2, 1–3			Piscines Bernat Picornell, Barcelona; Attendance: 1,300; Referees: Peris (CRO), Alexandrescu (ROU)
28 July 2013; 13:30	Match 28	Wigo 3	Goals	Español 4	Piscines Bernat Picornell, Barcelona; Attendance: 1,300; Referees: Peris (CRO), Alexandrescu (ROU)

28 July 2013; 17:30	Match 29	Serbia	13–5	Romania	Piscines Bernat Picornell, Barcelona; Attendance: 600; Referees: Koganov (AZE), Naumov (RUS)
28 July 2013; 17:30	Match 29	Score by quarters: 2–1, 5–1, 3–1, 3–2			Piscines Bernat Picornell, Barcelona; Attendance: 600; Referees: Koganov (AZE), Naumov (RUS)
28 July 2013; 17:30	Match 29	five players 2	Goals	Diaconu 3	Piscines Bernat Picornell, Barcelona; Attendance: 600; Referees: Koganov (AZE), Naumov (RUS)

28 July 2013; 18:50	Match 30	Hungary	16–7	Kazakhstan	Piscines Bernat Picornell, Barcelona; Attendance: 700; Referees: Reemnet (NED), Koryzna (POL)
28 July 2013; 18:50	Match 30	Score by quarters: 2–4, 7–1, 6–1, 1–1			Piscines Bernat Picornell, Barcelona; Attendance: 700; Referees: Reemnet (NED), Koryzna (POL)
28 July 2013; 18:50	Match 30	five players 2	Goals	Gubarev 3	Piscines Bernat Picornell, Barcelona; Attendance: 700; Referees: Reemnet (NED), Koryzna (POL)

28 July 2013; 20:10	Match 31	Italy	11–3	China	Piscines Bernat Picornell, Barcelona; Attendance: 600; Referees: Margeta (SLO), Terepenka (CAN)
28 July 2013; 20:10	Match 31	Score by quarters: 3–1, 3–1, 3–0, 2–1			Piscines Bernat Picornell, Barcelona; Attendance: 600; Referees: Margeta (SLO), Terepenka (CAN)
28 July 2013; 20:10	Match 31	Giorgetti 4	Goals	three players 1	Piscines Bernat Picornell, Barcelona; Attendance: 600; Referees: Margeta (SLO), Terepenka (CAN)

28 July 2013; 21:30	Match 32	Germany	4–8	Australia	Piscines Bernat Picornell, Barcelona; Attendance: 900; Referees: Borrell (ESP), Bianchi (ITA)
28 July 2013; 21:30	Match 32	Score by quarters: 0–2, 2–2, 0–1, 2–3			Piscines Bernat Picornell, Barcelona; Attendance: 900; Referees: Borrell (ESP), Bianchi (ITA)
28 July 2013; 21:30	Match 32	Nossek 2	Goals	three players 2	Piscines Bernat Picornell, Barcelona; Attendance: 900; Referees: Borrell (ESP), Bianchi (ITA)

=== Quarterfinals ===
30 July 2013; 15:30	Match 33	Greece	3–9	Hungary	Piscines Bernat Picornell, Barcelona; Attendance: 900; Referees: Golijanin (SRB), Bender (GER)
30 July 2013; 15:30	Match 33	Score by quarters: 1–2, 1–1, 1–2, 0–4			Piscines Bernat Picornell, Barcelona; Attendance: 900; Referees: Golijanin (SRB), Bender (GER)
30 July 2013; 15:30	Match 33	three players 1	Goals	three players 2	Piscines Bernat Picornell, Barcelona; Attendance: 900; Referees: Golijanin (SRB), Bender (GER)

30 July 2013; 17:00	Match 34	Croatia	7–6 (OT)	Australia	Piscines Bernat Picornell, Barcelona; Attendance: 1800; Referees: Borrell (ESP), Bianchi (ITA)
30 July 2013; 17:00	Match 34	Score by quarters: 1–1, 1–1, 0–1, 3–2 OT: 1–1, 1–0			Piscines Bernat Picornell, Barcelona; Attendance: 1800; Referees: Borrell (ESP), Bianchi (ITA)
30 July 2013; 17:00	Match 34	Joković 2	Goals	Miller 2	Piscines Bernat Picornell, Barcelona; Attendance: 1800; Referees: Borrell (ESP), Bianchi (ITA)

30 July 2013; 20:15	Match 35	Montenegro	9–8	Serbia	Piscines Bernat Picornell, Barcelona; Attendance: 500; Referees: Flahive (AUS), Margeta (SLO)
30 July 2013; 20:15	Match 35	Score by quarters: 2–3, 4–3, 1–2, 2–0			Piscines Bernat Picornell, Barcelona; Attendance: 500; Referees: Flahive (AUS), Margeta (SLO)
30 July 2013; 20:15	Match 35	Janović 3	Goals	Mitrović 2	Piscines Bernat Picornell, Barcelona; Attendance: 500; Referees: Flahive (AUS), Margeta (SLO)

30 July 2013; 21:45	Match 36	Spain	3–4	Italy	Piscines Bernat Picornell, Barcelona; Attendance: 4,500; Referees: Stavridis (GRE), Alexandrescu (ROU)
30 July 2013; 21:45	Match 36	Score by quarters: 2–2, 1–1, 0–1, 0–0			Piscines Bernat Picornell, Barcelona; Attendance: 4,500; Referees: Stavridis (GRE), Alexandrescu (ROU)
30 July 2013; 21:45	Match 36	three players 1	Goals	Figlioli 2	Piscines Bernat Picornell, Barcelona; Attendance: 4,500; Referees: Stavridis (GRE), Alexandrescu (ROU)

=== 5th–8th place semifinals ===
1 August 2013; 15:30	Match 37	Greece	11–9	Australia	Piscines Bernat Picornell, Barcelona; Attendance: 600; Referees: Golijanin (SRB), Bianchi (ITA)
1 August 2013; 15:30	Match 37	Score by quarters: 3–1, 4–3, 2–4, 2–1			Piscines Bernat Picornell, Barcelona; Attendance: 600; Referees: Golijanin (SRB), Bianchi (ITA)
1 August 2013; 15:30	Match 37	Delakas, Vlachopoulos 3	Goals	Younger 3	Piscines Bernat Picornell, Barcelona; Attendance: 600; Referees: Golijanin (SRB), Bianchi (ITA)

1 August 2013; 17:00	Match 38	Serbia	13–14 (OT)	Spain	Piscines Bernat Picornell, Barcelona; Attendance: 1,000; Referees: Koganov (AZE), Moller (ARG)
1 August 2013; 17:00	Match 38	Score by quarters: 2–2, 1–0, 2–3, 1–1 OT: 2–1, 0–1 pen. 5–6			Piscines Bernat Picornell, Barcelona; Attendance: 1,000; Referees: Koganov (AZE), Moller (ARG)
1 August 2013; 17:00	Match 38	Pijetlović, Filipović 2	Goals	three players 3	Piscines Bernat Picornell, Barcelona; Attendance: 1,000; Referees: Koganov (AZE), Moller (ARG)

=== Semifinals ===
1 August 2013; 20:15	Match 39	Hungary	11–10	Croatia	Piscines Bernat Picornell, Barcelona; Attendance: 4,000; Referees: Flahive (AUS), Naumov (RUS)
1 August 2013; 20:15	Match 39	Score by quarters: 2–3, 4–2, 3–2, 2–3			Piscines Bernat Picornell, Barcelona; Attendance: 4,000; Referees: Flahive (AUS), Naumov (RUS)
1 August 2013; 20:15	Match 39	Vámos, Szivós 3	Goals	four players 2	Piscines Bernat Picornell, Barcelona; Attendance: 4,000; Referees: Flahive (AUS), Naumov (RUS)

1 August 2013; 21:44	Match 40	Montenegro	10–8	Italy	Piscines Bernat Picornell, Barcelona; Attendance: 2,500; Referees: Margeta (SLO), Koryzna (POL)
1 August 2013; 21:44	Match 40	Score by quarters: 3–1, 2–0, 4–3, 1–4			Piscines Bernat Picornell, Barcelona; Attendance: 2,500; Referees: Margeta (SLO), Koryzna (POL)
1 August 2013; 21:44	Match 40	Janović 3	Goals	Figlioli, Aicardi 3	Piscines Bernat Picornell, Barcelona; Attendance: 2,500; Referees: Margeta (SLO), Koryzna (POL)

=== Seventh place game ===
3 August 2013; 15:00	Match 41	Australia	7–13	Serbia	Piscines Bernat Picornell, Barcelona; Attendance: 500; Referees: Peris (CRO), Moller (ARG)
3 August 2013; 15:00	Match 41	Score by quarters: 2–3, 2–2, 2–4, 1–4			Piscines Bernat Picornell, Barcelona; Attendance: 500; Referees: Peris (CRO), Moller (ARG)
3 August 2013; 15:00	Match 41	Swift, Howden 2	Goals	Filipović 5	Piscines Bernat Picornell, Barcelona; Attendance: 500; Referees: Peris (CRO), Moller (ARG)

=== Fifth place game ===
3 August 2013; 20:45	Match 42	Greece	8–10	Spain	Piscines Bernat Picornell, Barcelona; Attendance: 4,000; Referees: Golijanin (SRB), Flahive (AUS)
3 August 2013; 20:45	Match 42	Score by quarters: 2–1, 2–5, 4–2, 0–2			Piscines Bernat Picornell, Barcelona; Attendance: 4,000; Referees: Golijanin (SRB), Flahive (AUS)
3 August 2013; 20:45	Match 42	Delakas 3	Goals	Español 5	Piscines Bernat Picornell, Barcelona; Attendance: 4,000; Referees: Golijanin (SRB), Flahive (AUS)

=== Third place game ===
3 August 2013; 16:30	Match 43	Croatia	10–8	Italy	Piscines Bernat Picornell, Barcelona; Attendance: 3,500; Referees: Stavridis (GRE), Alexandrescu (ROU)
3 August 2013; 16:30	Match 43	Score by quarters: 4–2, 4–1, 1–2, 1–3			Piscines Bernat Picornell, Barcelona; Attendance: 3,500; Referees: Stavridis (GRE), Alexandrescu (ROU)
3 August 2013; 16:30	Match 43	Sukno, Joković 3	Goals	Giorgetti 3	Piscines Bernat Picornell, Barcelona; Attendance: 3,500; Referees: Stavridis (GRE), Alexandrescu (ROU)

=== Final ===
3 August 2013; 22:15	Match 44	Hungary	8–7	Montenegro	Piscines Bernat Picornell, Barcelona; Attendance: 4,500; Referees: Borrell (ESP), Margeta (SLO)
3 August 2013; 22:15	Match 44	Score by quarters: 2–0, 1–2, 3–3, 2–2			Piscines Bernat Picornell, Barcelona; Attendance: 4,500; Referees: Borrell (ESP), Margeta (SLO)
3 August 2013; 22:15	Match 44	Szivós, Hárai 2	Goals	Ivović 3	Piscines Bernat Picornell, Barcelona; Attendance: 4,500; Referees: Borrell (ESP), Margeta (SLO)

== Final ranking ==
Rank	Team
1st place, gold medalist(s)	Hungary
2nd place, silver medalist(s)	Montenegro
3rd place, bronze medalist(s)	Croatia
4	Italy
5	Spain
6	Greece
7	Serbia
8	Australia
9	United States
10	Germany
11	Canada
12	Kazakhstan
13	Romania
14	China
15	South Africa
16	New Zealand

2013 FINA Men's World champions

Hungary
Third title

Team Roster

Attila Decker, Viktor Nagy, Bence Bátori, Krisztián Bedő, Ádám Decker, Miklós Gór-Nagy, Balázs Hárai, Norbert Hosnyánszky, Norbert Madaras, Márton Szivós, Dániel Varga, Dénes Varga, Márton Vámos
Head coach: Tibor Benedek

== Medalists ==
Gold	Silver	Bronze
Hungary Viktor Nagy; Miklós Gór-Nagy; Norbert Madaras; Bence Bátori; Márton Vámos; Norbert Hosnyánszky; Ádám Decker; Márton Szivós; Dániel Varga (c); Dénes Varga; Krisztián Bedő; Balázs Hárai; Attila Decker Head coach: Tibor Benedek	Montenegro Zdravko Radić; Draško Brguljan; Vjekoslav Paskovic; Antonio Petrović; Darko Brguljan; Ugo Crousillat; Mlađan Janović; Nikola Janović (c); Aleksandar Ivović; Saša Mišić; Filip Klikovać; Predrag Jokić; Miloš Šćepanović] Head coach: Vido Lompar	Croatia Josip Pavić (c); Luka Lončar; Ivan Milaković; Fran Paškvalin; Maro Joković; Luka Bukić; Petar Muslim; Andro Bušlje; Sandro Sukno; Nikša Dobud; Anđelo Šetka; Paulo Obradović; Marko Bijač Head coach: Ivica Tucak

== Individual awards ==
Most Valuable Player

- (Hungary) Dénes Varga

Best Goalscorer

- (Croatia) Sandro Sukno / (Montenegro) Aleksandar Ivović – 20 goals

Best Goalkeeper

- (Hungary) Viktor Nagy

Media All-Star Team

- (Hungary) Viktor Nagy – Goalkeeper
- (Serbia) Duško Pijetlović – Centre forward
- (Italy) Pietro Figlioli
- (Montenegro) Aleksandar Ivović
- (Montenegro) Mlađan Janović
- (Croatia) Sandro Sukno
- (Hungary) Dénes Varga
