= FINA Water Polo World League =

International water polo league organized by FINA

- Sport: Water Polo
- Founded: 2002
- Folded: 2022
- Replaced by: FINA Water Polo World Cup; FINA Women's Water Polo World Cup
- Continent: all (International)
- Last champions: Men's: Italy (1st title); Women's: Spain (1st title)
- Most titles: Men's: Serbia (12 titles); Women's: United States (14 titles)

The FINA Water Polo World League was an international water polo league organized by FINA (now World Aquatics), which played annually, typically from winter through to June. League play featured continental tournaments for men and women, from which the top teams emerged to play in the championship tournament (the Super Final) where the league champion team is crowned.

Men's league play began in 2002, to capitalize on increased worldwide popularity of water polo created by the 2000 Olympic Games, especially in Europe, North America, and Australia. The women's league was added in 2004, based on growing interest in women's play.

In October 2022, FINA announced that the tournament would be replaced with the FINA Water Polo World Cup and FINA Women's Water Polo World Cup from 2023 on.

== Play format ==
Matches consisted of four eight-minute quarters, with a five-minute half-time break. Tie games were decided by an immediate penalty shootout. The game venues had television requirements to bring the sport to the biggest audience possible. Rule changes were made to provide more spectacular play and yield higher scores.

Preliminary rounds of play were organized by continent: Americas, Asia-Pacific, and Europe. The structure of continental play varied within the league. For example, for 2012, the Americas had a single tournament for each sex, Asia/Oceania has two tournaments for each sex on consecutive weekends, and Europe has six weekends of play for men and two for women.

== Men ==
=== Summary ===
FINA Men's Water Polo World League
Year	Host	Champion	Score	Runner-up	3rd place
2002	Patras, Greece	Russia	10–8	Spain	Hungary
2003	New York, USA	Hungary	13–8	Italy	United States
2004	Long Beach, USA	Hungary	12–8	Serbia and Montenegro	Greece
2005	Belgrade, Serbia and Montenegro	Serbia and Montenegro	16–6	Hungary	Germany
2006	Athens, Greece	Serbia and Montenegro	6–4	Spain	Greece
2007	Berlin, Germany	Serbia	9–6	Hungary	Australia
2008	Genoa, Italy	Serbia	7–3	United States	Australia
2009	Podgorica, Montenegro	Montenegro	8–7	Croatia	Serbia
2010	Niš, Serbia	Serbia	10–10 ^{(4–2 PSO)}	Montenegro	Croatia
2011	Florence, Italy	Serbia	8–7	Italy	Croatia
2012	Almaty, Kazakhstan	Croatia	8–8 ^{(10–9 PSO)}	Spain	Italy
2013	Chelyabinsk, Russia	Serbia	12–7	Hungary	Montenegro
2014	Dubai, UAE	Serbia	10–6	Hungary	Montenegro
2015	Bergamo, Italy	Serbia	9–6	Croatia	Brazil
2016	Huizhou, China	Serbia	10–6	United States	Greece
2017	Ruza, Russia	Serbia	10–9	Italy	Croatia
2018	Budapest, Hungary	Montenegro	9–9 ^{(4–2 PSO)}	Hungary	Spain
2019	Belgrade, Serbia	Serbia	12–11	Croatia	Australia
2020	Tbilisi, Georgia	Montenegro	9–8	United States	Greece
2022	Strasbourg, France	Italy	13–9	United States	Spain

=== Medal table ===
Rank	Nation	Gold	Silver	Bronze	Total
1	Serbia^{[a]}	10	0	1	11
2	Montenegro	3	1	2	6
3	Hungary	2	5	1	8
4	Serbia and Montenegro^{[a]}	2	1	0	3
5	Croatia	1	3	3	7
6	Italy	1	3	1	5
7	Russia	1	0	0	1
8	United States	0	4	1	5
9	Spain	0	3	2	5
10	Greece	0	0	4	4
11	Australia	0	0	3	3
12	Brazil	0	0	1	1
12	Germany	0	0	1	1
Totals (13 entries)		20	20	20	60

- ^[a] matches played from Serbia and Montenegro are separated from Serbia.

=== Participation details ===
Legend

- 1st – Champions
- 2nd – Runners-up
- 3rd – Third place
- 4th – Fourth place
- QF – Quarterfinals
- × — Did not enter qualifications
- • — Did not qualify for the final tournament
- •• — Qualified but withdrew
- – Hosts
- ^{†} – Defunct team

Africa – CANA (6 teams)
Men's team	2002	2003	2004	2005	2006	2007	2008	2009	2010	2011	2012	2013	2014	2015	2016	2017	2018	2019	2020	2022	YQ / YP
Algeria	×	×	×	×	×	×	•	•	•	×	×	×	×	×	×	×	×	×	×	×	0/3
Egypt	×	×	×	×	×	×	10th	×	×	×	×	×	×	×	×	×	×	×	×	×	1/1
Libya	×	×	×	×	×	×	×	•	×	×	×	×	×	×	×	×	×	×	×	×	0/1
Morocco	×	×	×	×	×	×	•	•	•	×	×	×	×	×	×	×	×	×	×	×	0/3
South Africa	×	×	×	×	×	×	×	8th	8th	×	×	×	×	×	×	×	×	•	×	×	2/3
Tunisia	×	×	×	×	×	×	•	×	•	×	×	×	×	×	×	×	×	×	×	×	0/2
Americas – ASUA (7 teams)
Argentina	×	×	×	×	×	×	×	×	×	×	×	×	×	•	×	×	•	•	×	•	0/4
Brazil	•	•	•	•	•	×	×	×	•	×	8th	8th	7th	3rd	7th	×	×	×	×	••	6/12
Canada	×	×	×	•	•	7th	6th	×	×	7th	•	•	6th	•	×	×	•	8th	×	8th	6/12
Colombia	×	×	×	×	×	×	×	×	×	×	×	×	×	×	×	×	×	×	×	•	0/1
Mexico	×	×	×	×	×	•	×	×	×	×	×	×	×	×	×	×	×	×	×	×	0/1
Puerto Rico	×	×	×	×	×	•	×	×	×	×	×	×	×	×	×	×	×	×	×	×	0/1
United States	•	3rd	6th	•	5th	5th	2nd	4th	5th	4th	4th	4th	5th	4th	2nd	4th	7th	×	2nd	2nd	17/19
Venezuela	×	×	×	×	×	×	×	×	•	×	×	×	×	×	×	×	×	×	×	×	0/1
Asia – AASF (5 teams)
China	×	×	×	•	•	8th	9th	×	7th	8th	6th	6th	8th	8th	8th	•	•	•	×	×	9/14
Iran	×	×	×	×	×	×	•	•	•	×	×	×	×	×	×	×	×	×	×	×	0/3
Japan	×	×	×	×	•	•	•	7th	•	•	•	7th	•	•	6th	8th	4th	6th	5th	×	7/15
Kazakhstan	×	×	×	×	×	×	×	×	•	•	5th	×	•	•	•	6th	8th	7th	6th	×	5/10
Saudi Arabia	×	×	×	×	×	×	×	×	×	×	×	×	×	×	×	×	•	×	×	×	0/1
Europe – LEN (20 teams)
Croatia	•	×	×	4th	•	•	•	2nd	3rd	3rd	1st	•	•	2nd	•	3rd	5th	2nd	•	•	9/18
France	×	×	×	×	6th	×	×	•	•	×	×	×	×	•	•	•	×	•	7th	4th	3/9
Georgia	×	×	×	×	×	×	×	×	×	×	×	×	×	×	•	•	×	×	8th	×	1/3
Germany	×	×	×	3rd	•	4th	×	•	•	•	•	•	•	•	×	•	•	•	×	•	2/14
Great Britain	×	×	×	×	×	×	×	×	×	×	•	×	×	×	×	×	×	×	×	×	0/1
Greece	4th	5th	3rd	5th	3rd	•	8th	•	•	•	•	•	•	•	3rd	•	×	•	3rd	•	8/19
Hungary	3rd	1st	1st	2nd	×	2nd	×	×	×	×	×	2nd	2nd	6th	•	×	2nd	5th	•	•	10/13
Italy	•	2nd	4th	•	•	•	7th	5th	•	2nd	3rd	•	•	7th	4th	2nd	×	•	4th	1st	11/19
Malta	×	×	×	×	×	×	×	×	×	×	×	×	×	×	×	×	×	•	×	×	0/1
Montenegro	Part of SCG / FRY					•	4th	1st	2nd	5th	×	3rd	3rd	•	•	×	1st	•	1st	6th	9/13
Netherlands	×	6th	×	×	×	×	×	×	×	•	×	×	×	×	×	•	•	•	•	×	1/6
North Macedonia	×	×	×	×	×	×	×	×	•	•	•	×	×	×	×	×	×	×	×	×	0/3
Romania	×	×	×	•	•	6th	•	•	•	•	•	•	•	•	•	•	•	•	×	•	1/16
Russia	1st	×	×	6th	•	•	•	•	•	•	•	5th	•	•	•	5th	•	•	•	DQ	4/17
Serbia	Part of SCG / FRY					1st	1st	3rd	1st	1st	×	1st	1st	1st	1st	1st	•	1st	•	5th	12/14
Serbia and Montenegro^{†}	×	4th	2nd	1st	1st	Defunct															4/4
Slovakia	×	×	×	×	×	×	×	×	×	×	×	×	•	•	×	•	×	×	×	•	0/4
Spain	2nd	×	5th	•	2nd	•	5th	•	6th	•	2nd	•	×	•	•	×	3rd	4th	•	3rd	9/17
Turkey	×	×	×	×	×	×	×	×	•	•	•	•	×	•	•	×	×	×	×	×	0/6
Ukraine	×	×	×	×	×	×	×	×	×	×	×	×	×	×	×	×	×	•	•	×	0/2
Oceania – OSA (2 teams)
Australia	×	•	•	•	4th	3rd	3rd	6th	4th	6th	7th	×	4th	5th	5th	7th	6th	3rd	×	7th	14/17
New Zealand	×	×	×	×	×	×	•	•	•	•	×	•	×	×	×	•	•	•	×	×	0/8
Total teams	4	6	6	6	6	8	10	8	8	8	8	8	8	8	8	8	8	8	8	8	

=== Performance by team ===
After 2015 World League

National team	Total*					Super Final						
National team	App	W%	Pld	W**	L**	A%	App	F4	W%	Pld	W**	L**
Algeria	3	0.533	15	8	7	0.000	0	0	0.000	0	0	0
Argentina	1	0.000	6	0	6	0.000	0	0	0.000	0	0	0
Australia	12	0.645	141	91	50	0.750	9	5	0.418	55	23	32
Brazil	10	0.230	87	20	67	0.400	4	1	0.250	24	6	18
Canada	9	0.288	66	19	47	0.444	4	0	0.292	24	7	17
China	10	0.368	114	42	72	0.800	8	0	0.130	46	6	40
Croatia	12	0.645	121	78	43	0.500	6	6	0.706	34	24	10
Egypt	1	0.429	7	3	4	1.000	1	0	0.000	4	0	4
France	4	0.222	36	8	28	0.250	1	0	0.000	7	0	7
Germany	10	0.333	75	25	50	0.200	2	2	0.625	8	5	3
Great Britain	1	0.000	4	0	4	0.000	0	0	0.000	0	0	0
Greece	14	0.460	126	58	68	0.429	6	3	0.346	26	9	17
Hungary	8	0.825	97	80	17	1.000	8	7	0.694	36	25	11
Iran	3	0.083	24	2	22	0.000	0	0	0.000	0	0	0
Italy	14	0.598	132	79	53	0.500	7	4	0.559	34	19	15
Japan	10	0.387	75	29	46	0.200	2	0	0.250	12	3	9
Kazakhstan	5	0.293	41	12	29	0.200	1	0	0.333	6	2	4
Libya	1	0.000	6	0	6	0.000	0	0	0.000	0	0	0
North Macedonia	3	0.188	16	3	13	0.000	0	0	0.000	0	0	0
Mexico	1	0.333	3	1	2	0.000	0	0	0.000	0	0	0
Montenegro	8	0.767	86	66	20	0.750	6	5	0.694	36	25	11
Morocco	3	0.200	15	3	12	0.000	0	0	0.000	0	0	0
Netherlands	2	0.091	11	1	10	0.500	1	0	0.000	2	0	2
New Zealand	5	0.111	36	4	32	0.000	0	0	0.000	0	0	0
Puerto Rico	1	0.000	3	0	3	0.000	0	0	0.000	0	0	0
Romania	11	0.413	75	31	44	0.091	1	0	0.500	6	3	3
Russia	12	0.421	95	40	55	0.250	3	1	0.500	14	7	7
Serbia***	12	0.895	143	128	15	1.000	12	12	0.937	63	59	4
Slovakia	2	0.083	12	1	11	0.000	0	0	0.000	0	0	0
South Africa	2	0.500	24	12	12	1.000	2	0	0.000	12	0	12
Spain	12	0.581	124	72	52	0.500	6	3	0.567	30	17	13
Tunisia	2	0.444	9	4	5	0.000	0	0	0.000	0	0	0
Turkey	5	0.031	32	1	31	0.000	0	0	0.000	0	0	0
United States	14	0.572	138	79	59	0.857	12	7	0.485	66	32	34
Venezuela	1	0.000	4	0	4	0.000	0	0	0.000	0	0	0

- *Since 2007 Preliminary Round is played among teams from the same regions (Asia/Oceania, Americas or Asia/Oceania/Americas, Africa and Europe); Super Final statistic included
- **Wins/Defeats after penalty shootout counted as wins/defeats.
- ***Serbia's total includes appearances as Serbia and Montenegro.

== Women ==
=== Summary ===
FINA Women's Water Polo World League
Year	Host	Champion	Runner-up	3rd Place
2004	Long Beach, USA	United States	Hungary	Italy
2005	Kirishi, Russia	Greece	Russia	Australia
2006	Cosenza, Italy	United States	Italy	Russia
2007	Montreal, Canada	United States	Australia	Greece
2008	Santa Cruz, Spain	Russia	United States	Australia
2009	Kirishi, Russia	United States	Canada	Australia
2010	La Jolla, USA	United States	Australia	Greece
2011	Tianjin, China	United States	Italy	Australia
2012	Changshu, China	United States	Australia	Greece
2013	Beijing, China	China	Russia	United States
2014	Kunshan, China	United States	Italy	Australia
2015	Shanghai, China	United States	Australia	Netherlands
2016	Shanghai, China	United States	Spain	Australia
2017	Shanghai, China	United States	Canada	Russia
2018	Kunshan, China	United States	Netherlands	Russia
2019	Budapest, Hungary	United States	Italy	Russia
2020	Athens, Greece	United States	Hungary	Russia
2022	Santa Cruz de Tenerife, Spain	Spain	Hungary	United States

=== Medal table ===
Rank	Nation	Gold	Silver	Bronze	Total
1	United States	14	1	2	17
2	Russia	1	2	5	8
3	Spain	1	1	0	2
4	Greece	1	0	3	4
5	China	1	0	0	1
6	Australia	0	4	6	10
7	Italy	0	4	1	5
8	Hungary	0	3	0	3
9	Canada	0	2	0	2
10	Netherlands	0	1	1	2
Totals (10 entries)		18	18	18	54

=== Participation details ===
Legend

- 1st – Champions
- 2nd – Runners-up
- 3rd – Third place
- 4th – Fourth place
- QF – Quarterfinals
- × — Did not enter qualifications
- • — Did not qualify for the final tournament
- •• — Qualified but withdrew
- – Hosts

Africa – CANA (1 team)
Women's team	2004	2005	2006	2007	2008	2009	2010	2011	2012	2013	2014	2015	2016	2017	2018	2019	2021	2022	YQ / YP
South Africa	×	×	×	×	×	•	•	×	×	×	×	×	×	×	×	•	×	×	0/3
Americas – ASUA (5 teams)
Women's team	2004	2005	2006	2007	2008	2009	2010	2011	2012	2013	2014	2015	2016	2017	2018	2019	2021	2022	YQ / YP
Argentina	×	×	×	×	×	×	×	×	×	×	×	×	×	×	×	×	×	•	0/1
Brazil	×	•	•	×	×	×	•	×	•	×	8th	8th	8th	×	×	×	×	••	4/7
Canada	5th	6th	6th	4th	4th	2nd	8th	6th	7th	8th	6th	6th	7th	2nd	4th	7th	4th	7th	18/18
Colombia	×	×	×	×	×	×	×	×	×	×	×	×	×	×	×	×	×	•	0/1
Cuba	×	×	×	×	×	×	×	×	×	×	×	×	×	×	×	×	×	•	0/1
Puerto Rico	×	×	×	•	×	×	•	×	×	×	×	×	×	×	×	×	×	×	0/2
United States	1st	5th	1st	1st	2nd	1st	1st	1st	1st	3rd	1st	1st	1st	1st	1st	1st	1st	3rd	18/18
Venezuela	×	×	×	×	×	×	×	×	×	×	•	×	×	×	×	×	×	×	0/1
Asia – AASF (3 teams)
Women's team	2004	2005	2006	2007	2008	2009	2010	2011	2012	2013	2014	2015	2016	2017	2018	2019	2021	2022	YQ / YP
China	×	×	•	6th	5th	5th	5th	4th	4th	1st	4th	4th	4th	6th	6th	8th	×	×	13/14
Japan	×	×	×	•	•	•	•	•	•	•	•	•	•	8th	8th	•	7th	×	3/14
Kazakhstan	8th	×	×	×	×	×	•	×	×	×	•	•	×	•	•	•	8th	×	2/8
Europe – LEN (10 teams)
Women's team	2004	2005	2006	2007	2008	2009	2010	2011	2012	2013	2014	2015	2016	2017	2018	2019	2021	2022	YQ / YP
France	×	•	•	×	×	•	•	×	×	×	×	•	•	•	×	•	•	•	0/10
Germany	×	•	•	•	×	•	•	•	6th	×	×	•	•	×	×	×	×	×	1/9
Great Britain	×	×	×	×	×	•	•	•	•	×	•	×	×	×	×	×	×	×	0/5
Greece	6th	1st	•	3rd	•	7th	3rd	7th	3rd	•	•	•	•	•	×	•	6th	•	9/16
Hungary	2nd	4th	×	•	×	×	6th	•	•	4th	•	•	•	4th	•	6th	2nd	2nd	8/15
Israel	×	×	×	×	×	×	×	×	×	×	×	×	×	×	×	•	×	•	0/1
Italy	3rd	8th	2nd	×	•	8th	•	2nd	8th	6th	2nd	7th	5th	•	×	2nd	•	5th	12/16
Netherlands	×	7th	5th	•	×	×	7th	×	•	•	×	3rd	•	5th	2nd	4th	•	4th	8/13
Russia	4th	2nd	3rd	•	1st	6th	4th	5th	5th	2nd	7th	5th	6th	3rd	3rd	3rd	3rd	DQ	16/17
Spain	×	•	•	5th	6th	4th	•	8th	•	5th	5th	•	2nd	×	5th	•	5th	1st	10/16
Oceania – OSA (2 teams)
Women's team	2004	2005	2006	2007	2008	2009	2010	2011	2012	2013	2014	2015	2016	2017	2018	2019	2021	2022	YQ / YP
Australia	7th	3rd	4th	2nd	3rd	3rd	2nd	3rd	2nd	7th	3rd	2nd	3rd	7th	7th	5th	×	6th	17/17
New Zealand	×	×	•	•	×	•	×	•	×	•	×	•	×	×	•	•	×	8th	1/9
Total teams	8	8	6	6	6	8	8	8	8	8	8	8	8	8	8	8	8	8	

== See also ==
- List of water polo world medalists
- Major achievements in water polo by nation
