= Morocco men's national water polo team =

Morocco
- FINA code: MAR
- Confederation: CANA (Africa)

World League
- Appearances: 1 (first in 2008)
- Best result: Preliminary round (2008)

The Morocco men's national water polo team is the representative for Morocco in international men's water polo.

== Results ==
=== FINA World League ===
- 2008 — Preliminary round
