= New Zealand men's national water polo team =

Men's national water polo team representing New Zealand

New Zealand
- FINA code: NZL
- Association: Swimming New Zealand
- Confederation: OSA (Oceania)
- Head coach: Zoltan Boros
- Asst coach: Lionel Randall
- Team manager: Quentin Quin
- Captain: No current captain
- Most caps: Lachlan Tijsen
- Top scorer(s): Lachlan Tijsen
- Home venue: National Aquatic Centre

World Championship
- Appearances: 7 (first in 1982)
- Best result: 15th place (2007)

World League
- Appearances: 8 (first in 2008)
- Best result: Preliminary round (2008)

Media
- Website: www.waterpolo.org.nz

The New Zealand men's national water polo team is the representative for New Zealand in international men's water polo.

The team placed 5th at the 2014 Commonwealth Water Polo Championships in Aberdeen, Scotland. As of August 2026, the team is not ranked in the top 42 globally. The head coach is Joe Kayes. He was appointed Head Coach in June 2024. Kayes, an Australian, had an illustrious playing career.

In 2025, the Men's Senior team placed 6th at the World University Games. The team lost in the 2025 Oceania Challenge match to Australia 0-3.

== Results ==
=== World Championship ===
- 1982 – 16th place
- 1991 – 16th place
- 1994 – 16th place
- 1998 – 16th place
- 2007 – 15th place
- 2013 – 16th place
- 2019 – 16th place

=== FINA World League ===
- 2008 – Asia/Oceania round

== Current roster ==
Roster for the 2019 World Championships.

Head coach: Davor Carevic

№	Name	Pos.	Height	Weight	L/R	Date of birth	Club
1	Sid Dymond	GK			R	15 November 1994 (age 31)	(New Zealand) Waitakere Blue Devils
2	Matthew Lewis	FP			L	31 October 1994 (age 31)	(New Zealand) Marist Magic
3	Rowan Brown	FP			R	9 October 2000 (age 26)	(New Zealand) North Harbour Turtles
4	Ryan Pike	CF			R	27 June 1997 (age 29)	(New Zealand) Marist Magic
5	Nicholas Stankovich	FW			L	14 November 1998 (age 27)	(New Zealand) Waitakere Blue Devils
6	Matthew Small (C)	FW			R	2 April 1993 (age 33)	(New Zealand) Marist Magic
7	Anton Sunde	FW			R	13 February 1996 (age 30)	(New Zealand) Waitakere Blue Devils
8	Joshua Potaka	FP			R	1 May 1987 (age 39)	(New Zealand) Marist Magic
9	Sean Bryant	FP			R	30 November 1993 (age 32)	(New Zealand) Hutt Heat
10	Matthew Bryant	CB			R	15 February 1991 (age 35)	(New Zealand) Hutt Heat
11	Louis Clark	CF			R	21 August 2001 (age 25)	(New Zealand) Canterbury Water Polo
12	Sean Newcombe	FW			R	20 October 1994 (age 31)	(New Zealand) Waitakere Blue Devils
13	Bae Fountain	GK			R	10 January 2001 (age 25)	(New Zealand) Tauranga Body In Motion
