= Water polo at the 2012 Summer Olympics – Men's team rosters =

These are the rosters of all participating teams at the men's water polo tournament at the 2012 Summer Olympics in London.

Abbreviations
Pos.	Position	№	Cap number
CF	Centre forward	CB	Centre back
D	Defense	GK	Goalkeeper

== Pool A ==
=== Australia ===
The following is the Australian roster in the men's water polo tournament of the 2012 Summer Olympics.

№	Name	Pos.	Height	Weight	Date of birth	2012 club
1	Joel Dennerley	GK	194 cm (6 ft 4 in)	94 kg (207 lb)	25 June 1987	(Australia) UNSW Wests Magpies
2	Richie Campbell	CB	193 cm (6 ft 4 in)	99 kg (218 lb)	18 September 1987	(Australia) UNSW Wests Magpies
3	Tim Cleland	CB	195 cm (6 ft 5 in)	115 kg (254 lb)	15 December 1984	(Australia) Fremantle Mariners
4	Johnno Cotterill	D	193 cm (6 ft 4 in)	88 kg (194 lb)	27 October 1987	(Greece) Panionios Water Polo Club
5	Aaron Younger	D	193 cm (6 ft 4 in)	100 kg (220 lb)	25 September 1991	(Hungary) Szeged Beton
6	Jamie Beadsworth	CF	193 cm (6 ft 4 in)	114 kg (251 lb)	11 June 1985	(Australia) Fremantle Mariners
7	Aiden Roach	D	186 cm (6 ft 1 in)	88 kg (194 lb)	7 September 1990	(Australia) Drummoyne Devils
8	Sam McGregor	D	192 cm (6 ft 4 in)	95 kg (209 lb)	12 August 1984	(Australia) Victorian Tigers
9	Thomas Whalan	D	194 cm (6 ft 4 in)	90 kg (198 lb)	13 October 1980	(Australia) Sydney Uni Water Polo Club
10	Gavin Woods	CF	199 cm (6 ft 6 in)	95 kg (209 lb)	1 March 1978	(Australia) Balmain Tigers
11	Rhys Howden	D	188 cm (6 ft 2 in)	82 kg (181 lb)	2 April 1987	(Australia) Brisbane Barracudas
12	Billy Miller	D	188 cm (6 ft 2 in)	89 kg (196 lb)	21 February 1988	(Australia) Queensland Breakers
13	James Clark	GK	195 cm (6 ft 5 in)	95 kg (209 lb)	22 March 1991	(Australia) Balmain Water Polo Club

Head coach: John Fox

=== Croatia ===
The following is the Croatian roster in the men's water polo tournament of the 2012 Summer Olympics.

№	Name	Pos.	Height	Weight	Date of birth	2012 club
1	Josip Pavić	GK	1.95 m (6 ft 5 in)	90 kg (198 lb)	15 January 1982	(Croatia) HAVK Mladost
2	Damir Burić	CB	2.05 m (6 ft 9 in)	115 kg (254 lb)	2 December 1980	(Italy) Pro Recco
3	Miho Bošković	D	1.96 m (6 ft 5 in)	96 kg (212 lb)	11 January 1983	(Hungary) TEVA-Vasas-UNIQA
4	Nikša Dobud	CF	1.99 m (6 ft 6 in)	118 kg (260 lb)	5 August 1985	(Croatia) VK Jug Dubrovnik
5	Maro Joković	D	2.03 m (6 ft 8 in)	95 kg (209 lb)	1 October 1987	(Croatia) VK Jug Dubrovnik
6	Ivan Buljubašić	CB	1.98 m (6 ft 6 in)	108 kg (238 lb)	31 October 1987	(Croatia) Primorje EB
7	Petar Muslim	D	2.00 m (6 ft 7 in)	102 kg (225 lb)	26 March 1988	(Croatia) Primorje EB
8	Andro Bušlje	CB	2.00 m (6 ft 7 in)	115 kg (254 lb)	4 January 1986	(Croatia) VK Jug Dubrovnik
9	Sandro Sukno	D	2.00 m (6 ft 7 in)	93 kg (205 lb)	30 June 1990	(Italy) Pro Recco
10	Samir Barač	D	1.87 m (6 ft 2 in)	89 kg (196 lb)	2 November 1973	(Croatia) Primorje EB
11	Igor Hinić	CF	2.02 m (6 ft 8 in)	110 kg (243 lb)	4 December 1975	(Croatia) HAVK Mladost
12	Paulo Obradović	D	1.90 m (6 ft 3 in)	100 kg (220 lb)	9 March 1986	(Croatia) VK Jug Dubrovnik
13	Frano Vićan	GK	1.92 m (6 ft 4 in)	94 kg (207 lb)	24 January 1976	(Croatia) VK Jug Dubrovnik

Head coach: Ratko Rudić

=== Greece ===
The following is the Greek roster in the men's water polo tournament of the 2012 Summer Olympics.

№	Name	Pos.	Height	Weight	Date of birth	2012 club
1	Nikolaos Deligiannis	GK	1.90 m (6 ft 3 in)	95 kg (209 lb)	3 September 1976	(Greece) Olympiacos
2	Emmanouil Mylonakis	D	1.85 m (6 ft 1 in)	75 kg (165 lb)	9 April 1985	(Greece) NO Vouliagmeni
3	Andreas Miralis	D	1.83 m (6 ft 0 in)	89 kg (196 lb)	21 September 1987	(Greece) NO Patras
4	Konstantinos Kokkinakis	CB	1.93 m (6 ft 4 in)	107 kg (236 lb)	9 October 1975	(Greece) Panathinaikos
5	Theodoros Chatzitheodorou	D	1.90 m (6 ft 3 in)	100 kg (220 lb)	1 October 1976	(Greece) NC Chios
6	Argyris Theodoropoulos	D	1.87 m (6 ft 2 in)	95 kg (209 lb)	13 January 1981	(Greece) NC Chios
7	Christos Afroudakis	D	1.88 m (6 ft 2 in)	88 kg (194 lb)	23 May 1984	(Greece) NO Vouliagmeni
8	Evangelos Delakas	CB	1.90 m (6 ft 3 in)	88 kg (194 lb)	8 February 1985	(Greece) Olympiacos
9	Georgios Afroudakis	CF	1.94 m (6 ft 4 in)	103 kg (227 lb)	17 October 1976	(Greece) Panathinaikos
10	Ioannis Fountoulis	D	1.87 m (6 ft 2 in)	86 kg (190 lb)	25 May 1988	(Greece) Olympiacos
11	Konstantinos Mourikis	CF	1.98 m (6 ft 6 in)	115 kg (254 lb)	11 July 1988	(Greece) Olympiacos
12	Manthos Voulgarakis	CF	1.88 m (6 ft 2 in)	104 kg (229 lb)	14 March 1980	(Greece) NO Vouliagmeni
13	Filippos Karampetsos	GK	1.92 m (6 ft 4 in)	95 kg (209 lb)	22 October 1974	(Greece) NC Chios

Head coach: Dragan Andrić

=== Italy ===
The following is the Italian roster in the men's water polo tournament of the 2012 Summer Olympics.

№	Name	Pos.	Height	Weight	Date of birth	2012 club
1	Stefano Tempesti	GK	2.05 m (6 ft 9 in)	99 kg (218 lb)	9 June 1979	(Italy) Pro Recco
2	Amaurys Pérez	CB	1.94 m (6 ft 4 in)	98 kg (216 lb)	18 March 1976	(Italy) Posillipo
3	Niccolò Gitto	CB	1.85 m (6 ft 1 in)	82 kg (181 lb)	12 October 1986	(Italy) Pro Recco
4	Pietro Figlioli	D	1.92 m (6 ft 4 in)	98 kg (216 lb)	29 May 1984	(Italy) Pro Recco
5	Alex Giorgetti	D	1.87 m (6 ft 2 in)	78 kg (172 lb)	24 December 1987	(Italy) Pro Recco
6	Maurizio Felugo	D	1.89 m (6 ft 2 in)	86 kg (190 lb)	4 March 1981	(Italy) Pro Recco
7	Massimo Giacoppo	CB	1.84 m (6 ft 0 in)	90 kg (198 lb)	10 May 1983	(Italy) Pro Recco
8	Valentino Gallo	D	1.93 m (6 ft 4 in)	93 kg (205 lb)	17 July 1985	(Italy) Posillipo
9	Christian Presciutti	D	1.85 m (6 ft 1 in)	85 kg (187 lb)	27 November 1982	(Italy) AN Brescia
10	Deni Fiorentini	CB	1.91 m (6 ft 3 in)	86 kg (190 lb)	5 June 1984	(Italy) Pro Recco
11	Matteo Aicardi	CF	1.92 m (6 ft 4 in)	104 kg (229 lb)	19 April 1986	(Italy) RN Savona
12	Danijel Premuš	CF	1.86 m (6 ft 1 in)	98 kg (216 lb)	15 April 1981	(Montenegro) PVK Jadran
13	Giacomo Pastorino	GK	1.91 m (6 ft 3 in)	89 kg (196 lb)	7 June 1980	(Italy) Pro Recco

Head coach: Alessandro Campagna

=== Kazakhstan ===
The following is the Kazakh roster in the men's water polo tournament of the 2012 Summer Olympics.

№	Name	Pos.	Height	Weight	Date of birth	2012 club
1	Nikolay Maximov	GK	1.90 m (6 ft 3 in)	95 kg (209 lb)	15 November 1972	(Kazakhstan) SK Astana
2	Sergey Gubarev	D	1.83 m (6 ft 0 in)	90 kg (198 lb)	30 October 1978	(Russia) Dynamo Moscow
3	Murat Shakenov	D	1.83 m (6 ft 0 in)	71 kg (157 lb)	23 September 1990	(Kazakhstan) SK Astana
4	Sergey Gorovoy	CB	1.92 m (6 ft 4 in)	105 kg (231 lb)	6 August 1975	(Kazakhstan) SK Astana
5	Alexey Panfili	CB	1.98 m (6 ft 6 in)	98 kg (216 lb)	5 January 1974	(Russia) Spartak Volgograd
6	Alexey Shmider	CB	1.83 m (6 ft 0 in)	80 kg (176 lb)	19 March 1990	(Kazakhstan) SK Astana
7	Vladimir Ushakov	D	1.95 m (6 ft 5 in)	94 kg (207 lb)	16 March 1982	(Russia) Dynamo Moscow
8	Rustam Ukumanov	D	1.92 m (6 ft 4 in)	86 kg (190 lb)	22 March 1986	(Kazakhstan) SK Astana
9	Yevgeniy Zhilyayev	CB	1.91 m (6 ft 3 in)	93 kg (205 lb)	13 July 1973	(Kazakhstan) SK Astana
10	Mikhail Ruday	CF	1.93 m (6 ft 4 in)	95 kg (209 lb)	4 May 1988	(Kazakhstan) SK Astana
11	Ravil Manafov	CF	1.94 m (6 ft 4 in)	98 kg (216 lb)	22 June 1988	(Kazakhstan) SK Astana
12	Nikita Kokorin	D	1.91 m (6 ft 3 in)	77 kg (170 lb)	22 July 1989	(Kazakhstan) SK Astana
13	Alexandr Shvedov	GK	1.97 m (6 ft 6 in)	85 kg (187 lb)	11 April 1973	(Kazakhstan) SK Astana

Head coach: Sergey Drozdov

=== Spain ===
The following is the Spanish roster in the men's water polo tournament of the 2012 Summer Olympics.

№	Name	Pos.	Height	Weight	Date of birth	2012 club
1	Iñaki Aguilar	GK	1.89 m (6 ft 2 in)	82 kg (181 lb)	9 September 1983	(Spain) CN Sabadell
2	Mario José García	D	1.90 m (6 ft 3 in)	91 kg (201 lb)	15 July 1983	(Spain) Real Canoe
3	David Martín	D	1.77 m (5 ft 10 in)	78 kg (172 lb)	2 January 1977	(Spain) CN Atlètic-Barceloneta
4	Balázs Szirányi	CF	1.96 m (6 ft 5 in)	108 kg (238 lb)	10 January 1983	(Spain) Real Canoe
5	Guillermo Molina	CF	1.94 m (6 ft 4 in)	108 kg (238 lb)	16 March 1984	(Italy) Pro Recco
6	Marc Minguell	CF	1.86 m (6 ft 1 in)	95 kg (209 lb)	14 January 1985	(Italy) Posillipo
7	Blai Mallarach	CF	1.87 m (6 ft 2 in)	87 kg (192 lb)	21 August 1987	(Croatia) HAVK Mladost
8	Albert Español	D	1.89 m (6 ft 2 in)	86 kg (190 lb)	29 October 1986	(Spain) CN Atlètic-Barceloneta
9	Xavier Vallès	CF	1.91 m (6 ft 3 in)	94 kg (207 lb)	4 September 1979	(Spain) CN Atlètic-Barceloneta
10	Felipe Perrone	D	1.83 m (6 ft 0 in)	95 kg (209 lb)	27 February 1986	(Italy) Pro Recco
11	Iván Pérez	CF	1.97 m (6 ft 6 in)	109 kg (240 lb)	29 June 1971	(Spain) CN Sabadell
12	Xavier García	CF	1.98 m (6 ft 6 in)	92 kg (203 lb)	5 January 1984	(Croatia) VK Primorje Rijeka
13	Daniel López	GK	1.91 m (6 ft 3 in)	87 kg (192 lb)	16 July 1980	(Spain) CN Atlètic-Barceloneta

Head coach: Rafael Aguilar

== Pool B ==
=== Great Britain ===
The following is the British roster in the men's water polo tournament of the 2012 Summer Olympics.

№	Name	Pos.	Height	Weight	Date of birth	2012 club
1	Edward Scott	GK	1.97 m (6 ft 6 in)	85 kg (187 lb)	28 May 1988	(Spain) CE Mediterrani
2	Ciaran James	D	1.93 m (6 ft 4 in)	93 kg (205 lb)	5 July 1991	(Germany) SV Cannstatt
3	Glen Robinson	D	1.88 m (6 ft 2 in)	90 kg (198 lb)	26 January 1989	(Germany) SV Wurzburg 05
4	Sean King	D	1.93 m (6 ft 4 in)	91 kg (201 lb)	3 May 1989	(Germany) SV Weiden
5	Craig Figes	D	1.83 m (6 ft 0 in)	90 kg (198 lb)	14 August 1978	(Italy) Pescara
6	Jack Waller	CF	1.87 m (6 ft 2 in)	95 kg (209 lb)	6 October 1989	(Spain) CN Sant Andreu
7	Alexander Parsonage	D	1.80 m (5 ft 11 in)	87 kg (192 lb)	30 April 1985	(Netherlands) UZSC
8	Jake Vincent	CB	1.97 m (6 ft 6 in)	98 kg (216 lb)	24 June 1989	(Germany) SV Bayer Uerdingen
9	Robert Parker	CB	2.00 m (6 ft 7 in)	100 kg (220 lb)	4 December 1987	(Spain) CN Terrassa
10	Adam Scholefield	CF	1.89 m (6 ft 2 in)	99 kg (218 lb)	24 May 1985	(Hungary) PVSK
11	Sean Ryder	D	1.88 m (6 ft 2 in)	94 kg (207 lb)	18 June 1987	(Germany) SV Weiden
12	Joseph O’Regan	CB	2.03 m (6 ft 8 in)	104 kg (229 lb)	22 June 1991	(Hungary) PVSK
13	Matthew Holland	GK	1.94 m (6 ft 4 in)	96 kg (212 lb)	22 June 1989	(France) Aix-en-Provence

Head coach: Cristian Iordache

=== Hungary ===
The following is the Hungarian roster in the men's water polo tournament of the 2012 Summer Olympics.

№	Name	Pos.	Height	Weight	Date of birth	2012 club
1	Zoltán Szécsi	GK	1.98 m (6 ft 6 in)	96 kg (212 lb)	22 December 1977	(Hungary) ZF-Eger
2	Tamás Varga	CB	2.01 m (6 ft 7 in)	105 kg (231 lb)	14 July 1975	(Hungary) Debreceni VSE
3	Norbert Madaras	D	1.91 m (6 ft 3 in)	91 kg (201 lb)	1 December 1979	(Italy) Pro Recco
4	Dénes Varga	D	1.93 m (6 ft 4 in)	95 kg (209 lb)	29 March 1987	(Croatia) Primorje EB
5	Tamás Kásás	D	2.00 m (6 ft 7 in)	97 kg (214 lb)	20 July 1976	(Italy) Pro Recco
6	Norbert Hosnyánszky	D	1.96 m (6 ft 5 in)	102 kg (225 lb)	4 March 1984	(Hungary) ZF-Eger
7	Gergely Kiss	D	1.98 m (6 ft 6 in)	112 kg (247 lb)	27 September 1977	(Hungary) TEVA-Vasas-UNIQA
8	Márton Szivós	CB	1.93 m (6 ft 4 in)	91 kg (201 lb)	19 August 1981	(Hungary) Grupama Honvéd
9	Dániel Varga	CB	2.01 m (6 ft 7 in)	95 kg (209 lb)	25 September 1983	(Croatia) Primorje EB
10	Péter Biros	D	1.96 m (6 ft 5 in)	102 kg (225 lb)	5 April 1976	(Hungary) ZF-Eger
11	Ádám Steinmetz	CF	1.98 m (6 ft 6 in)	104 kg (229 lb)	11 August 1980	(Hungary) TEVA-Vasas-UNIQA
12	Balázs Hárai	CF	2.02 m (6 ft 8 in)	110 kg (243 lb)	5 April 1987	(Hungary) Grupama Honvéd
13	Viktor Nagy	GK	1.98 m (6 ft 6 in)	94 kg (207 lb)	24 July 1984	(Hungary) TEVA-Vasas-UNIQA

Head coach: Dénes Kemény

=== Montenegro ===
The following is the Montenegrin roster in the men's water polo tournament of the 2012 Summer Olympics.

№	Name	Pos.	Height	Weight	Date of birth	2012 club
1	Denis Sefik	D	1.98 m (6 ft 6 in)	115 kg (254 lb)	20 September 1976	(Italy) ASD Civitavecchia
2	Draško Brguljan	D	1.94 m (6 ft 4 in)	88 kg (194 lb)	27 December 1984	(Hungary) TEVA-Vasas-UNIQA
3	Vjekoslav Pasković	D	1.81 m (5 ft 11 in)	85 kg (187 lb)	23 March 1985	(Italy) Posillipo
4	Antonio Petrović	CB	1.93 m (6 ft 4 in)	95 kg (209 lb)	24 September 1982	(Italy) RN Savona
5	Dragan Drasković	D	1.92 m (6 ft 4 in)	94 kg (207 lb)	1 September 1988	(Italy) RN Bogliasco
6	Aleksandar Radović	D	1.91 m (6 ft 3 in)	95 kg (209 lb)	24 February 1987	(Serbia) VK Partizan
7	Mlađan Janović	D	1.91 m (6 ft 3 in)	94 kg (207 lb)	11 June 1984	(Italy) RN Savona
8	Nikola Janović	D	1.91 m (6 ft 3 in)	100 kg (220 lb)	22 March 1980	(Croatia) VK Jug Dubrovnik
9	Aleksandar Ivović	CB	1.97 m (6 ft 6 in)	105 kg (231 lb)	24 February 1986	(Montenegro) PVK Jadran
10	Boris Zloković	CF	1.97 m (6 ft 6 in)	100 kg (220 lb)	16 March 1983	(Italy) Pro Recco
11	Vladimir Gojković	D	1.88 m (6 ft 2 in)	92 kg (203 lb)	29 January 1981	(Montenegro) PVK Jadran
12	Predrag Jokić	CF	1.88 m (6 ft 2 in)	96 kg (212 lb)	3 February 1983	(Montenegro) VK Budva
13	Miloš Šćepanović	GK	1.85 m (6 ft 1 in)	89 kg (196 lb)	9 October 1982	(Montenegro) PVK Jadran

Head coach: Ranko Perović

=== Romania ===
The following is the Romanian roster in the men's water polo tournament of the 2012 Summer Olympics.

№	Name	Pos.	Height	Weight	Date of birth	2012 club
1	Dragoș Stoenescu	GK	1.96 m (6 ft 5 in)	96 kg (212 lb)	30 May 1979	(Romania) CS Dinamo București
2	Cosmin Radu	CF	1.93 m (6 ft 4 in)	110 kg (243 lb)	9 November 1981	(Croatia) HAVK Mladost
3	Tiberiu Negrean	D	1.87 m (6 ft 2 in)	85 kg (187 lb)	1 September 1988	(Hungary) Szolnoki Vizilabda SC
4	Nicolae Diaconu	D	1.80 m (5 ft 11 in)	88 kg (194 lb)	4 September 1980	(Romania) CSM Oradea
5	Andrei Iosep	D	1.95 m (6 ft 5 in)	99 kg (218 lb)	20 September 1977	(Spain) CW Havarra
6	Andrei Bușilă	CB	1.91 m (6 ft 3 in)	92 kg (203 lb)	10 November 1980	(Romania) CSM Oradea
7	Alexandru Matei	D	1.95 m (6 ft 5 in)	95 kg (209 lb)	31 December 1980	(Romania) CS Dinamo București
8	Mihnea Chioveanu	CF	1.98 m (6 ft 6 in)	115 kg (254 lb)	21 August 1987	(Romania) CSM Oradea
9	Dimitri Goantă	CB	2.02 m (6 ft 8 in)	113 kg (249 lb)	17 July 1987	(Switzerland) SC Horgen
10	Ramiro Georgescu	D	1.93 m (6 ft 4 in)	93 kg (205 lb)	27 November 1982	(Hungary) Szolnoki Vizilabda SC
11	Alexandru Ghiban	CB	1.96 m (6 ft 5 in)	96 kg (212 lb)	12 October 1986	(Romania) CSM Oradea
12	Kalman Kadar	CB	1.90 m (6 ft 3 in)	84 kg (185 lb)	11 June 1979	(Romania) CSM Oradea
13	Mihai Drăgușin	GK	1.88 m (6 ft 2 in)	85 kg (187 lb)	5 January 1984	(Romania) CSA Steaua București

Head coach: István Kovács

=== Serbia ===
The following is the Serbian roster in the men's water polo tournament of the 2012 Summer Olympics.

№	Name	Pos.	Height	Weight	Date of birth	2012 club
1	Slobodan Soro	GK	1.96 m (6 ft 5 in)	100 kg (220 lb)	23 December 1978	(Serbia) VK Partizan
2	Aleksa Šaponjić	D	2.05 m (6 ft 9 in)	92 kg (203 lb)	4 June 1992	(United States) CA Golden Bears
3	Živko Gocić	D	1.93 m (6 ft 4 in)	100 kg (220 lb)	22 August 1982	(Hungary) Szolnoki Vízilabda SC
4	Vanja Udovičić	CB	1.95 m (6 ft 5 in)	102 kg (225 lb)	12 September 1982	(Serbia) Radnicki
5	Dušan Mandić	D	1.90 m (6 ft 3 in)	91 kg (201 lb)	16 June 1994	(Serbia) VK Partizan
6	Duško Pijetlović	CF	1.86 m (6 ft 1 in)	95 kg (209 lb)	25 April 1985	(Serbia) Crvena Zvezda
7	Slobodan Nikić	CF	1.96 m (6 ft 5 in)	94 kg (207 lb)	25 January 1983	(Turkey) Galatasaray Waterpolo
8	Milan Aleksić	CB	1.97 m (6 ft 6 in)	100 kg (220 lb)	13 May 1986	(Hungary) Szolnoki Vízilabda SC
9	Nikola Rađen	CB	1.95 m (6 ft 5 in)	103 kg (227 lb)	29 January 1985	(Serbia) Crvena Zvezda
10	Filip Filipović	D	1.97 m (6 ft 6 in)	100 kg (220 lb)	2 May 1987	(Serbia) Radnički
11	Andrija Prlainović	D	1.87 m (6 ft 2 in)	94 kg (207 lb)	28 April 1987	(Serbia) Crvena Zvezda
12	Stefan Mitrović	D	1.94 m (6 ft 4 in)	85 kg (187 lb)	29 March 1988	(Serbia) VK Partizan
13	Gojko Pijetlović	GK	1.94 m (6 ft 4 in)	100 kg (220 lb)	7 August 1983	(Hungary) Ferencvárosi

Head coach: Dejan Udovičić

=== United States ===
The following is the American roster in the men's water polo tournament of the 2012 Summer Olympics.

№	Name	Pos.	Height	Weight	Date of birth	2012 club
1	Merrill Moses	GK	1.91 m (6 ft 3 in)	98 kg (216 lb)	13 August 1977	(United States) New York Athletic Club
2	Peter Varellas	D	1.91 m (6 ft 3 in)	88 kg (194 lb)	2 October 1984	(United States) The Olympic Club
3	Peter Hudnut	CB	1.96 m (6 ft 5 in)	102 kg (225 lb)	16 February 1980	(United States) Los Angeles WP Club
4	Jeff Powers	CF	2.01 m (6 ft 7 in)	108 kg (238 lb)	21 January 1980	(United States) Newport WP Foundation
5	Adam Wright	D	1.91 m (6 ft 3 in)	88 kg (194 lb)	1 March 1978	(United States) New York Athletic Club
6	Shea Buckner	D	1.93 m (6 ft 4 in)	98 kg (216 lb)	12 December 1986	(United States) New York Athletic Club
7	Layne Beaubien	D	1.96 m (6 ft 5 in)	100 kg (220 lb)	4 July 1976	(United States) New York Athletic Club
8	Tony Azevedo	D	1.85 m (6 ft 1 in)	91 kg (201 lb)	21 November 1981	(United States) New York Athletic Club
9	Ryan Bailey	CF	1.96 m (6 ft 5 in)	111 kg (245 lb)	28 August 1975	(United States) Newport WP Foundation
10	Tim Hutten	CB	1.96 m (6 ft 5 in)	100 kg (220 lb)	11 June 1985	(United States) Newport WP Foundation
11	Jesse Smith	CB	1.93 m (6 ft 4 in)	104 kg (229 lb)	27 April 1983	(United States) New York Athletic Club
12	John Mann	CF	1.98 m (6 ft 6 in)	113 kg (249 lb)	27 January 1978	(United States) New York Athletic Club
13	Chay Lapin	GK	1.96 m (6 ft 5 in)	93 kg (205 lb)	25 February 1987	(United States) Long Beach Shore Aquatics

Head coach: Terry Schroeder

== See also ==
- Water polo at the 2012 Summer Olympics – Women's team rosters
