= Water polo at the 2012 Summer Olympics – Men's tournament =

Men's water polo at the Games of the XXX Olympiad

Tournament details
- Host country: United Kingdom
- City: London
- Venue(s): Water Polo Arena
- Dates: 29 July – 12 August 2012
- Teams: 12 (from 4 confederations)
- Competitors: 155

Final positions
- Champions: Croatia (1st title)
- Runners-up: Italy
- Third place: Serbia
- Fourth place: Montenegro

Tournament statistics
- Matches: 42
- Goals scored: 763 (18.17 per match)
- Multiple appearances: 5-time Olympian(s): 3 players 4-time Olympian(s): 14 players
- Multiple medalists: 3-time medalist(s): 5 players
- Top scorer(s): (Serbia) Andrija Prlainović (22 goals in 8 matches)
- Most saves: (Italy) Stefano Tempesti (87 saves in 8 matches)
- Top sprinter(s): (Italy) Pietro Figlioli (Australia) Rhys Howden (19 sprints won in 8 matches)
- MVP: (Croatia) Josip Pavić

The men's tournament of water polo at the 2012 Summer Olympics at London, Great Britain, began on 29 July and lasted until 12 August 2012. All games were held at the Water Polo Arena.

Teams from twelve nations competed in the tournament and were seeded into two groups for the preliminary round. A total of 42 games were played, 30 of them in the preliminary round.

== Format ==
The format of water polo at the 2012 Summer Olympics:

- Twelve teams were divided into two preliminary groups, composed of six teams each, and played a single round robin in each group.
- The top 4 teams from each group played against each other in a cross-group format in the Quarterfinals.
- Winners from the Quarterfinal progressed to the Semifinals and played against another winner from the Quarterfinal round. Losers went on to play classification games.
- Winners of the Semifinals contested the gold medal game and the losers the bronze medal game.

== Preliminary round ==
=== Group A ===
Team	Pld	W	D	L	GF	GA	GD	Pts	Qualification
Croatia	5	5	0	0	50	29	+21	10	Quarterfinals
Italy	5	3	1	1	40	36	+4	7	Quarterfinals
Spain	5	3	0	2	52	42	+10	6	Quarterfinals
Australia	5	2	0	3	40	44	−4	4	Quarterfinals
Greece	5	1	1	3	41	43	−2	3	
Kazakhstan	5	0	0	5	24	53	−29	0	

All times are British Summer Time (UTC+1).

29 July 2012; 10:00	Report	Greece	6–8	Croatia	Water Polo Arena, London; Referees: Adrian Alexandrescu (ROU), György Juhász (HUN)
29 July 2012; 10:00	Report	Score by quarters: 2–1, 1–2, 2–2, 1–3			Water Polo Arena, London; Referees: Adrian Alexandrescu (ROU), György Juhász (HUN)
29 July 2012; 10:00	Report	Fountoulis, Mourikis 2	Goals	three players 2	Water Polo Arena, London; Referees: Adrian Alexandrescu (ROU), György Juhász (HUN)

29 July 2012; 11:20	Report	Kazakhstan	6–14	Spain	Water Polo Arena, London; Referees: Marijo Brguljan (MNE), Ulrich Spiegel (GER)
29 July 2012; 11:20	Report	Score by quarters: 2–4, 1–5, 1–3, 2–2			Water Polo Arena, London; Referees: Marijo Brguljan (MNE), Ulrich Spiegel (GER)
29 July 2012; 11:20	Report	Gubarev, Ushakov 2	Goals	Perrone 5	Water Polo Arena, London; Referees: Marijo Brguljan (MNE), Ulrich Spiegel (GER)

29 July 2012; 14:10	Report	Italy	8–5	Australia	Water Polo Arena, London; Referees: Boris Margeta (SLO), Radoslaw Koryzna (POL)
29 July 2012; 14:10	Report	Score by quarters: 3–0, 2–2, 0–1, 3–2			Water Polo Arena, London; Referees: Boris Margeta (SLO), Radoslaw Koryzna (POL)
29 July 2012; 14:10	Report	Felugo, Giorgetti 2	Goals	five players 1	Water Polo Arena, London; Referees: Boris Margeta (SLO), Radoslaw Koryzna (POL)

31 July 2012; 11:20	Report	Croatia	8–7	Spain	Water Polo Arena, London; Referees: Boris Margeta (SLO), Radoslaw Koryzna (POL)
31 July 2012; 11:20	Report	Score by quarters: 2–1, 3–2, 2–4, 1–0			Water Polo Arena, London; Referees: Boris Margeta (SLO), Radoslaw Koryzna (POL)
31 July 2012; 11:20	Report	Sukno, Dobud 2	Goals	Español 4	Water Polo Arena, London; Referees: Boris Margeta (SLO), Radoslaw Koryzna (POL)

31 July 2012; 14:10	Report	Australia	7–4	Kazakhstan	Water Polo Arena, London; Referees: Adrian Alexandrescu (ROU), Ulrich Spiegel (GER)
31 July 2012; 14:10	Report	Score by quarters: 2–1, 2–0, 2–2, 1–1			Water Polo Arena, London; Referees: Adrian Alexandrescu (ROU), Ulrich Spiegel (GER)
31 July 2012; 14:10	Report	Howden 2	Goals	four players 1	Water Polo Arena, London; Referees: Adrian Alexandrescu (ROU), Ulrich Spiegel (GER)

31 July 2012; 15:30	Report	Greece	7–7	Italy	Water Polo Arena, London; Referees: Marijo Brguljan (MNE), Mihajlo Ćirić (SRB)
31 July 2012; 15:30	Report	Score by quarters: 2–1, 1–2, 2–3, 2–1			Water Polo Arena, London; Referees: Marijo Brguljan (MNE), Mihajlo Ćirić (SRB)
31 July 2012; 15:30	Report	Fountoulis, Afroudakis 2	Goals	Presciutti 2	Water Polo Arena, London; Referees: Marijo Brguljan (MNE), Mihajlo Ćirić (SRB)

2 August 2012; 10:00	Report	Spain	13–9	Australia	Water Polo Arena, London; Referees: Mihajlo Ćirić (SRB), Steven Rotsart (USA)
2 August 2012; 10:00	Report	Score by quarters: 2–1, 3–3, 4–1, 4–4			Water Polo Arena, London; Referees: Mihajlo Ćirić (SRB), Steven Rotsart (USA)
2 August 2012; 10:00	Report	three players 2	Goals	Miller 5	Water Polo Arena, London; Referees: Mihajlo Ćirić (SRB), Steven Rotsart (USA)

2 August 2012; 19:40	Report	Italy	6–11	Croatia	Water Polo Arena, London; Referees: Gyorgy Juhasz (HUN), Adrian Alexandrescu (ROU)
2 August 2012; 19:40	Report	Score by quarters: 3–4, 1–1, 1–3, 1–3			Water Polo Arena, London; Referees: Gyorgy Juhasz (HUN), Adrian Alexandrescu (ROU)
2 August 2012; 19:40	Report	Figlioli, Gallo 2	Goals	Bošković, Sukno 3	Water Polo Arena, London; Referees: Gyorgy Juhasz (HUN), Adrian Alexandrescu (ROU)

2 August 2012; 11:20	Report	Kazakhstan	4–11	Greece	Water Polo Arena, London; Referees: Ulrich Spiegel (GER), Brian Littlejohn (GBR)
2 August 2012; 11:20	Report	Score by quarters: 1–2, 0–4, 1–3, 2–2			Water Polo Arena, London; Referees: Ulrich Spiegel (GER), Brian Littlejohn (GBR)
2 August 2012; 11:20	Report	Ukumanov 2	Goals	Fountoulis 5	Water Polo Arena, London; Referees: Ulrich Spiegel (GER), Brian Littlejohn (GBR)

4 August 2012; 11:20	Report	Croatia	11–6	Australia	Water Polo Arena, London; Referees: Ulrich Spiegel (GER), Gyorgy Juhasz (HUN)
4 August 2012; 11:20	Report	Score by quarters: 2–1, 3–1, 3–2, 3–2			Water Polo Arena, London; Referees: Ulrich Spiegel (GER), Gyorgy Juhasz (HUN)
4 August 2012; 11:20	Report	Joković 3	Goals	Whalan 3	Water Polo Arena, London; Referees: Ulrich Spiegel (GER), Gyorgy Juhasz (HUN)

4 August 2012; 14:10	Report	Greece	9–11	Spain	Water Polo Arena, London; Referees: Marijo Brguljan (MNE), Adrian Alexandrescu (ROU)
4 August 2012; 14:10	Report	Score by quarters: 3–4, 2–4, 2–1, 2–2			Water Polo Arena, London; Referees: Marijo Brguljan (MNE), Adrian Alexandrescu (ROU)
4 August 2012; 14:10	Report	Delakas 3	Goals	three players 3	Water Polo Arena, London; Referees: Marijo Brguljan (MNE), Adrian Alexandrescu (ROU)

4 August 2012; 15:30	Report	Italy	9–6	Kazakhstan	Water Polo Arena, London; Referees: Anton Bervoets (NED), Cory Williams (NZL)
4 August 2012; 15:30	Report	Score by quarters: 4–2, 4–2, 1–1, 0–1			Water Polo Arena, London; Referees: Anton Bervoets (NED), Cory Williams (NZL)
4 August 2012; 15:30	Report	four players 2	Goals	Shmider, Zhilyayev 2	Water Polo Arena, London; Referees: Anton Bervoets (NED), Cory Williams (NZL)

6 August 2012; 10:00	Report	Kazakhstan	4–12	Croatia	Water Polo Arena, London; Referees: German Moller (ARG), Brian Littlejohn (GBR)
6 August 2012; 10:00	Report	Score by quarters: 0–4, 1–1, 2–4, 1–3			Water Polo Arena, London; Referees: German Moller (ARG), Brian Littlejohn (GBR)
6 August 2012; 10:00	Report	Zhilyayev 2	Goals	Dobud 5	Water Polo Arena, London; Referees: German Moller (ARG), Brian Littlejohn (GBR)

6 August 2012; 11:20	Report	Greece	8–13	Australia	Water Polo Arena, London; Referees: Mihajlo Ćirić (SRB), Sergi Sanchez (ESP)
6 August 2012; 11:20	Report	Score by quarters: 2–3, 3–5, 1–3, 2–2			Water Polo Arena, London; Referees: Mihajlo Ćirić (SRB), Sergi Sanchez (ESP)
6 August 2012; 11:20	Report	Chatzitheodorou 3	Goals	Howden 3	Water Polo Arena, London; Referees: Mihajlo Ćirić (SRB), Sergi Sanchez (ESP)

6 August 2012; 19:40	Report	Spain	7–10	Italy	Water Polo Arena, London; Referees: Adrian Alexandrescu (ROU), Dragan Stampalija (CRO)
6 August 2012; 19:40	Report	Score by quarters: 0–2, 3–4, 1–2, 3–2			Water Polo Arena, London; Referees: Adrian Alexandrescu (ROU), Dragan Stampalija (CRO)
6 August 2012; 19:40	Report	Español 3	Goals	Premuš 3	Water Polo Arena, London; Referees: Adrian Alexandrescu (ROU), Dragan Stampalija (CRO)

=== Group B ===
Team	Pld	W	D	L	GF	GA	GD	Pts	Qualification
Serbia	5	4	1	0	69	38	+31	9	Quarterfinals
Montenegro	5	3	1	1	54	41	+13	7	Quarterfinals
Hungary	5	3	0	2	65	52	+13	6	Quarterfinals
United States	5	3	0	2	43	44	−1	6	Quarterfinals
Romania	5	1	0	4	48	55	−7	2	
Great Britain	5	0	0	5	28	77	−49	0	

29 July 2012; 15:30	Report	Hungary	10–14	Serbia	Water Polo Arena, London; Referees: Sergi Sanchez (ESP), Massimiliano Caputi (ITA)
29 July 2012; 15:30	Report	Score by quarters: 2–2, 1–3, 3–5, 4–4			Water Polo Arena, London; Referees: Sergi Sanchez (ESP), Massimiliano Caputi (ITA)
29 July 2012; 15:30	Report	three players 2	Goals	Prlainović 5	Water Polo Arena, London; Referees: Sergi Sanchez (ESP), Massimiliano Caputi (ITA)

29 July 2012; 18:20	Report	Romania	13–4	Great Britain	Water Polo Arena, London; Referees: German Moller (ARG), Anton Bervoets (NED)
29 July 2012; 18:20	Report	Score by quarters: 2–1, 4–0, 3–2, 4–1			Water Polo Arena, London; Referees: German Moller (ARG), Anton Bervoets (NED)
29 July 2012; 18:20	Report	Diaconu 4	Goals	Parker 2	Water Polo Arena, London; Referees: German Moller (ARG), Anton Bervoets (NED)

29 July 2012; 19:40	Report	Montenegro	7–8	United States	Water Polo Arena, London; Referees: Georgios Stavridis (GRE), Daniel Flahive (AUS)
29 July 2012; 19:40	Report	Score by quarters: 1–1, 1–3, 2–2, 3–2			Water Polo Arena, London; Referees: Georgios Stavridis (GRE), Daniel Flahive (AUS)
29 July 2012; 19:40	Report	Ivović 3	Goals	Varellas 3	Water Polo Arena, London; Referees: Georgios Stavridis (GRE), Daniel Flahive (AUS)

31 July 2012; 10:00	Report	Hungary	10–11	Montenegro	Water Polo Arena, London; Referees: Sergi Sanchez (ESP), Daniel Flahive (AUS)
31 July 2012; 10:00	Report	Score by quarters: 2–2, 3–4, 3–3, 2–2			Water Polo Arena, London; Referees: Sergi Sanchez (ESP), Daniel Flahive (AUS)
31 July 2012; 10:00	Report	Biros 3	Goals	Brguljan 3	Water Polo Arena, London; Referees: Sergi Sanchez (ESP), Daniel Flahive (AUS)

31 July 2012; 18:20	Report	Serbia	21–7	Great Britain	Water Polo Arena, London; Referees: Gus Pinker (RSA), Kazuhiko Makita (JPN)
31 July 2012; 18:20	Report	Score by quarters: 3–3, 7–2, 6–1, 5–1			Water Polo Arena, London; Referees: Gus Pinker (RSA), Kazuhiko Makita (JPN)
31 July 2012; 18:20	Report	Prlainović 5	Goals	Figes 3	Water Polo Arena, London; Referees: Gus Pinker (RSA), Kazuhiko Makita (JPN)

31 July 2012; 19:40	Report	United States	10–8	Romania	Water Polo Arena, London; Referees: Dragan Stampalija (CRO), Massimiliano Caputi (ITA)
31 July 2012; 19:40	Report	Score by quarters: 3–3, 1–2, 3–0, 3–3			Water Polo Arena, London; Referees: Dragan Stampalija (CRO), Massimiliano Caputi (ITA)
31 July 2012; 19:40	Report	Varellas, Bailey 3	Goals	Radu 4	Water Polo Arena, London; Referees: Dragan Stampalija (CRO), Massimiliano Caputi (ITA)

2 August 2012; 14:10	Report	Montenegro	11–11	Serbia	Water Polo Arena, London; Referees: Georgios Stavridis (GRE), Massimiliano Caputi (ITA)
2 August 2012; 14:10	Report	Score by quarters: 1–3, 2–1, 5–4, 3–3			Water Polo Arena, London; Referees: Georgios Stavridis (GRE), Massimiliano Caputi (ITA)
2 August 2012; 14:10	Report	Ivović 3	Goals	Prlainović 5	Water Polo Arena, London; Referees: Georgios Stavridis (GRE), Massimiliano Caputi (ITA)

2 August 2012; 15:30	Report	Romania	15–17	Hungary	Water Polo Arena, London; Referees: Massimiliano Balfanbayev (KAZ), Sergi Sanchez (ESP)
2 August 2012; 15:30	Report	Score by quarters: 4–5, 5–4, 2-5, 4-3			Water Polo Arena, London; Referees: Massimiliano Balfanbayev (KAZ), Sergi Sanchez (ESP)
2 August 2012; 15:30	Report	Bușilă, Ghiban 3	Goals	Madaras 5	Water Polo Arena, London; Referees: Massimiliano Balfanbayev (KAZ), Sergi Sanchez (ESP)

2 August 2012; 18:20	Report	Great Britain	7–13	United States	Water Polo Arena, London; Referees: Cory Williams (NZL), Ni Shiwei (CHN)
2 August 2012; 18:20	Report	Score by quarters: 0–5, 3–3, 3–2, 1–3			Water Polo Arena, London; Referees: Cory Williams (NZL), Ni Shiwei (CHN)
2 August 2012; 18:20	Report	Parker 3	Goals	Azevedo 4	Water Polo Arena, London; Referees: Cory Williams (NZL), Ni Shiwei (CHN)

4 August 2012; 10:00	Report	Montenegro	12–8	Romania	Water Polo Arena, London; Referees: Daniel Flahive (AUS), Alan Balfanbayev (KAZ)
4 August 2012; 10:00	Report	Score by quarters: 3–1, 2–1, 3–2, 4–4			Water Polo Arena, London; Referees: Daniel Flahive (AUS), Alan Balfanbayev (KAZ)
4 August 2012; 10:00	Report	Ivović 3	Goals	Diaconu 3	Water Polo Arena, London; Referees: Daniel Flahive (AUS), Alan Balfanbayev (KAZ)

4 August 2012; 18:20	Report	Hungary	17–6	Great Britain	Water Polo Arena, London; Referees: German Moller (ARG), Denis Danelon (BRA)
4 August 2012; 18:20	Report	Score by quarters: 6–1, 5–4, 4–0, 2–1			Water Polo Arena, London; Referees: German Moller (ARG), Denis Danelon (BRA)
4 August 2012; 18:20	Report	Kásás, Madaras 3	Goals	six players 1	Water Polo Arena, London; Referees: German Moller (ARG), Denis Danelon (BRA)

4 August 2012; 19:40	Report	Serbia	11–6	United States	Water Polo Arena, London; Referees: Sergi Sanchez (ESP), Massimiliano Caputi (ITA)
4 August 2012; 19:40	Report	Score by quarters: 4–1, 1–2, 3–1, 3–2			Water Polo Arena, London; Referees: Sergi Sanchez (ESP), Massimiliano Caputi (ITA)
4 August 2012; 19:40	Report	Udovičić 3	Goals	Bailey 2	Water Polo Arena, London; Referees: Sergi Sanchez (ESP), Massimiliano Caputi (ITA)

6 August 2012; 14:10	Report	Romania	4–12	Serbia	Water Polo Arena, London; Referees: Ulrich Spiegel (GER), Steven Rotsart (USA)
6 August 2012; 14:10	Report	Score by quarters: 0–3, 1–3, 0–4, 3–2			Water Polo Arena, London; Referees: Ulrich Spiegel (GER), Steven Rotsart (USA)
6 August 2012; 14:10	Report	four players 1	Goals	Nikić, Mitrović 3	Water Polo Arena, London; Referees: Ulrich Spiegel (GER), Steven Rotsart (USA)

6 August 2012; 15:30	Report	Hungary	11–6	United States	Water Polo Arena, London; Referees: Daniel Flahive (AUS), Georgios Stavridis (GRE)
6 August 2012; 15:30	Report	Score by quarters: 1–0, 5–2, 4–1, 1–3			Water Polo Arena, London; Referees: Daniel Flahive (AUS), Georgios Stavridis (GRE)
6 August 2012; 15:30	Report	Hosnyánszky 3	Goals	six players 1	Water Polo Arena, London; Referees: Daniel Flahive (AUS), Georgios Stavridis (GRE)

6 August 2012; 18:20	Report	Great Britain	4–13	Montenegro	Water Polo Arena, London; Referees: Ni Shiwei (CHN), Kazuhiko Makita (JPN)
6 August 2012; 18:20	Report	Score by quarters: 1–4, 2–4, 1–2, 0–3			Water Polo Arena, London; Referees: Ni Shiwei (CHN), Kazuhiko Makita (JPN)
6 August 2012; 18:20	Report	four players 1	Goals	Zloković 3	Water Polo Arena, London; Referees: Ni Shiwei (CHN), Kazuhiko Makita (JPN)

== Medal round ==
Bracket

Quarter-finals
A1	Croatia	8
B4	United States	2
A3	Spain	9
B2	Montenegro	11
A2	Italy	11
B3	Hungary	9
A4	Australia	8
B1	Serbia	11

Semi-finals
A1	Croatia	7
B2	Montenegro	5
A2	Italy	9
B1	Serbia	7

Gold medal match
A1	Croatia	8
A2	Italy	6
Bronze medal match
B2	Montenegro	11
B1	Serbia	12

=== Quarter-finals ===
8 August 2012; 14:30	Report	Spain	9–11	Montenegro	Water Polo Arena, London; Referees: Adrian Alexandrescu (ROU), Ulrich Spiegel (GER)
8 August 2012; 14:30	Report	Score by quarters: 4–4, 1–3, 1–3, 3–1			Water Polo Arena, London; Referees: Adrian Alexandrescu (ROU), Ulrich Spiegel (GER)
8 August 2012; 14:30	Report	Vallès, Minguell 2	Goals	Zloković 4	Water Polo Arena, London; Referees: Adrian Alexandrescu (ROU), Ulrich Spiegel (GER)

8 August 2012; 15:50	Report	Australia	8–11	Serbia	Water Polo Arena, London; Referees: Sergi Sanchez (ESP), Steven Rotsart (USA)
8 August 2012; 15:50	Report	Score by quarters: 3–2, 4–2, 1–2, 0–5			Water Polo Arena, London; Referees: Sergi Sanchez (ESP), Steven Rotsart (USA)
8 August 2012; 15:50	Report	Campbell, Beadsworth 2	Goals	Filipović 3	Water Polo Arena, London; Referees: Sergi Sanchez (ESP), Steven Rotsart (USA)

8 August 2012; 18:40	Report	Italy	11–9	Hungary	Water Polo Arena, London; Referees: Georgios Stavridis (GRE), Alan Balfanbayev (KAZ)
8 August 2012; 18:40	Report	Score by quarters: 2–2, 3–2, 3–1, 3–4			Water Polo Arena, London; Referees: Georgios Stavridis (GRE), Alan Balfanbayev (KAZ)
8 August 2012; 18:40	Report	three players 3	Goals	Madaras 3	Water Polo Arena, London; Referees: Georgios Stavridis (GRE), Alan Balfanbayev (KAZ)

8 August 2012; 20:00	Report	Croatia	8–2	United States	Water Polo Arena, London; Referees: Massimiliano Caputi (ITA), György Juhász (HUN)
8 August 2012; 20:00	Report	Score by quarters: 2–0, 3–0, 2–2, 1–0			Water Polo Arena, London; Referees: Massimiliano Caputi (ITA), György Juhász (HUN)
8 August 2012; 20:00	Report	Bošković, Obradović 2	Goals	Bailey, Varellas 1	Water Polo Arena, London; Referees: Massimiliano Caputi (ITA), György Juhász (HUN)

=== Semi-finals ===
10 August 2012; 15:40	Report	Croatia	7–5	Montenegro	Water Polo Arena, London; Referees: Daniel Flahive (AUS), Georgios Stavridis (GRE)
10 August 2012; 15:40	Report	Score by quarters: 3–1, 2–0, 2–2, 0–2			Water Polo Arena, London; Referees: Daniel Flahive (AUS), Georgios Stavridis (GRE)
10 August 2012; 15:40	Report	Sukno 2	Goals	Ivović, Gojković 2	Water Polo Arena, London; Referees: Daniel Flahive (AUS), Georgios Stavridis (GRE)

10 August 2012; 19:50	Report	Italy	9–7	Serbia	Water Polo Arena, London; Referees: Sergi Sanchez (ESP), Adrian Alexandrescu (ROU)
10 August 2012; 19:50	Report	Score by quarters: 4–2, 2–2, 2–1, 1–2			Water Polo Arena, London; Referees: Sergi Sanchez (ESP), Adrian Alexandrescu (ROU)
10 August 2012; 19:50	Report	Gallo 3	Goals	Udovičić 3	Water Polo Arena, London; Referees: Sergi Sanchez (ESP), Adrian Alexandrescu (ROU)

=== Bronze medal match ===
12 August 2012; 14:30	Report	Montenegro	11–12	Serbia (bronze)	Water Polo Arena, London; Referees: Massimiliano Caputi (ITA), Georgios Stavridis (GRE)
12 August 2012; 14:30	Report	Score by quarters: 2–3, 3–1, 5–4, 1–4			Water Polo Arena, London; Referees: Massimiliano Caputi (ITA), Georgios Stavridis (GRE)
12 August 2012; 14:30	Report	Ivović 3	Goals	Filipović 3	Water Polo Arena, London; Referees: Massimiliano Caputi (ITA), Georgios Stavridis (GRE)

=== Gold medal match ===
12 August 2012; 15:50	Report	(gold) Croatia	8–6	Italy (silver)	Water Polo Arena, London; Referees: Sergi Sancherz (ESP), Gyorgy Juhasz (HUN)
12 August 2012; 15:50	Report	Score by quarters: 1–2, 2–0, 2–1, 3–3			Water Polo Arena, London; Referees: Sergi Sancherz (ESP), Gyorgy Juhasz (HUN)
12 August 2012; 15:50	Report	Joković 3	Goals	Felugo 3	Water Polo Arena, London; Referees: Sergi Sancherz (ESP), Gyorgy Juhasz (HUN)

== Classification ==
Bracket

Semi-finals
United States	7
Spain	8
Hungary	10
Australia	9

5th–6th place
Spain	8
Hungary	14
7th–8th place
United States	9
Australia	10

=== 5th–8th place semi-finals ===
10 August 2012; 14:20	Report	United States	7–8	Spain	Water Polo Arena, London; Referees: Marijo Brguljan (CRO), Gyorgy Juhasz (HUN)
10 August 2012; 14:20	Report	Score by quarters: 1–3, 1–2, 2–1, 3–2			Water Polo Arena, London; Referees: Marijo Brguljan (CRO), Gyorgy Juhasz (HUN)
10 August 2012; 14:20	Report	Powers, Beaubien 2	Goals	Perrone 3	Water Polo Arena, London; Referees: Marijo Brguljan (CRO), Gyorgy Juhasz (HUN)

10 August 2012; 18:30	Report	Hungary	10–9	Australia	Water Polo Arena, London; Referees: Mihajlo Ćirić (SRB), German Moller (ARG)
10 August 2012; 18:30	Report	Score by quarters: 4–2, 2–4, 1–0, 3–3			Water Polo Arena, London; Referees: Mihajlo Ćirić (SRB), German Moller (ARG)
10 August 2012; 18:30	Report	Madaras, Biros 3	Goals	three players 2	Water Polo Arena, London; Referees: Mihajlo Ćirić (SRB), German Moller (ARG)

=== 7th–8th place match ===
12 August 2012; 10:20	Report	United States	9–10	Australia	Water Polo Arena, London; Referees: Dragan Stampalija (CRO), Ulrich Spiegel (GER)
12 August 2012; 10:20	Report	Score by quarters: 1–3, 2–2, 1–3, 5–2			Water Polo Arena, London; Referees: Dragan Stampalija (CRO), Ulrich Spiegel (GER)
12 August 2012; 10:20	Report	four players 2	Goals	Miller, Campbell 3	Water Polo Arena, London; Referees: Dragan Stampalija (CRO), Ulrich Spiegel (GER)

=== 5th–6th place match ===
12 August 2012; 11:40	Report	Spain	8–14	Hungary	Water Polo Arena, London; Referees: Marijo Brguljan (MNE), Alan Balfanbayev (KAZ)
12 August 2012; 11:40	Report	Score by quarters: 1–4, 2–3, 1–5, 4–2			Water Polo Arena, London; Referees: Marijo Brguljan (MNE), Alan Balfanbayev (KAZ)
12 August 2012; 11:40	Report	Minguell 3	Goals	six players 2	Water Polo Arena, London; Referees: Marijo Brguljan (MNE), Alan Balfanbayev (KAZ)

== Final ranking ==
Rank	Team
1st place, gold medalist(s)	Croatia
2nd place, silver medalist(s)	Italy
3rd place, bronze medalist(s)	Serbia
4	Montenegro
5	Hungary
6	Spain
7	Australia
8	United States
9	Greece
10	Romania
11	Kazakhstan
12	Great Britain

2012 Men's Olympic champions

Croatia
First title

== Medalists ==
Gold	Silver	Bronze
Croatia Josip Pavić (GK); Damir Burić; Miho Bošković; Nikša Dobud; Maro Joković (LH); Ivan Buljubašić; Petar Muslim; Andro Bušlje; Sandro Sukno; Samir Barać (C); Igor Hinić; Paulo Obradović; Frano Vićan (GK) Head coach: Ratko Rudić	Italy Stefano Tempesti (C, GK); Amaurys Pérez; Niccolò Gitto; Pietro Figlioli; Alex Giorgetti; Maurizio Felugo; Massimo Giacoppo; Valentino Gallo (LH); Christian Presciutti; Deni Fiorentini; Matteo Aicardi; Danijel Premuš; Giacomo Pastorino (GK) Head coach: Alessandro Campagna	Serbia Slobodan Soro (GK); Aleksa Šaponjić; Živko Gocić; Vanja Udovičić (C); Dušan Mandić (LH); Duško Pijetlović; Slobodan Nikić; Milan Aleksić; Nikola Rađen; Filip Filipović (LH); Andrija Prlainović; Stefan Mitrović; Gojko Pijetlović (GK) Head coach: Dejan Udovičić

== Statistics ==
=== Multi-time Olympians ===
Five-time Olympian(s): 3 players

- Croatia: Igor Hinić
- Greece: Georgios Afroudakis
- Hungary: Tamás Kásás

Four-time Olympian(s): 14 players

- Australia: Thomas Whalan, Gavin Woods
- Croatia: Samir Barać, Frano Vićan (GK)
- Greece: Theodoros Chatzitheodorou, Nikolaos Deligiannis (GK)
- Hungary: Péter Biros, Gergely Kiss, Zoltán Szécsi (GK)
- Italy: Stefano Tempesti (GK)
- Kazakhstan: Nikolay Maksimov (GK)
- Spain: Iván Pérez
- United States: Tony Azevedo, Ryan Bailey

=== Multiple medalists ===
Three-time Olympic medalist(s): 5 players

- Hungary: Péter Biros, Tamás Kásás, Gergely Kiss, Zoltán Szécsi (GK)
- Serbia: Vanja Udovičić

=== Leading goalscorers ===
Rank	Player	Team	Goals	Matches played	Goals per match	Shots	%
1	Andrija Prlainović	Serbia	22	8	2.750	40	55.0%
2	Aleksandar Ivović	Montenegro	19	8	2.375	43	44.2%
3	Filip Filipović	Serbia	18	8	2.250	42	42.9%
3	Norbert Madaras	Hungary	18	8	2.250	37	48.6%
5	Péter Biros	Hungary	16	8	2.000	38	42.1%
5	Felipe Perrone	Spain	16	8	2.000	33	48.5%
7	Miho Bošković	Croatia	15	8	1.875	33	45.5%
7	Vanja Udovičić	Serbia	15	8	1.875	41	36.6%
9	Albert Español	Spain	14	8	1.750	30	46.7%
9	Norbert Hosnyánszky	Hungary	14	8	1.750	23	60.9%
9	Marc Minguell	Spain	14	8	1.750	31	45.2%
9	Sandro Sukno	Croatia	14	8	1.750	30	46.7%
9	Boris Zloković	Montenegro	14	8	1.750	30	46.7%

Source: Official Results Book (page 466)

=== Leading goalkeepers ===
Rank	Goalkeeper	Team	Saves	Matches played	Saves per match	Shots	%
1	Stefano Tempesti	Italy	87	8	10.875	147	59.2%
2	Josip Pavić	Croatia	85	8	10.625	121	70.2%
3	Slobodan Soro	Serbia	75	8	9.375	135	55.6%
4	Merrill Moses	United States	72	8	9.000	135	53.3%
5	Miloš Šćepanović	Montenegro	59	8	7.375	122	48.4%
6	Iñaki Aguilar	Spain	52	8	6.500	98	53.1%
7	Joel Dennerley	Australia	51	8	6.375	104	49.0%
8	Nikolay Maksimov	Kazakhstan	50	5	10.000	103	48.5%
9	Dragoș Stoenescu	Romania	48	5	9.600	97	49.5%
10	Nikolaos Deligiannis	Greece	45	5	9.000	83	54.2%

Source: Official Results Book (page 462)

=== Leading sprinters ===
Rank	Sprinter	Team	Sprints won	Matches played	Sprints won per match	Sprints contested	%
1	Pietro Figlioli	Italy	19	8	2.375	21	90.5%
1	Rhys Howden	Australia	19	8	2.375	24	79.2%
3	Albert Español	Spain	15	8	1.875	25	60.0%
4	Sandro Sukno	Croatia	11	8	1.375	16	68.8%
5	Deni Fiorentini	Italy	10	8	1.250	10	100%
5	Peter Varellas	United States	10	8	1.250	15	66.7%
7	Vjekoslav Pasković	Montenegro	8	8	1.000	17	47.1%
8	Maro Joković	Croatia	7	8	0.875	13	53.8%
8	Tamás Kásás	Hungary	7	8	0.875	9	77.8%
8	Aleksa Šaponjić	Serbia	7	8	0.875	11	63.6%

Source: Official Results Book (page 465)

== Awards ==
The men's all-star team was announced on 12 August 2012.

Most Valuable Player

- (Croatia) Josip Pavić (85 saves)

Media All-Star Team

- Goalkeeper
  - (Croatia) Josip Pavić (85 saves)
- Field players
  - (Croatia) Nikša Dobud (centre forward, 12 goals)
  - (Italy) Maurizio Felugo (12 goals)
  - (Serbia) Filip Filipović (left-handed, 18 goals, 2 sprints won)
  - (Montenegro) Aleksandar Ivović (centre back, 19 goals)
  - (Spain) Felipe Perrone (16 goals)
  - (Serbia) Andrija Prlainović (22 goals)

== See also ==
- Water polo at the 2012 Summer Olympics – Women's tournament

== Sources ==
- PDF documents on the FINA website:
  - Official Results Book – 2012 Olympic Games – Diving, Swimming, Synchronised Swimming, Water Polo (archive) (pp. 284–507)
- Water polo on the Olympedia website
  - Water polo at the 2012 Summer Olympics (men's tournament)
- Water polo on the Sports Reference website
  - Water polo at the 2012 Summer Games (men's tournament) (archived)
