= Jack Waller =

Jack Waller may refer to:

- Jack Waller (water polo) (born 1989), British water polo player
- Jack Waller (field hockey) (born 1997), English field hockey player
