= Adam Scholefield =

British water polo player and researcher

Personal information
- Born: 24 May 1985 (age 41) Leeds, Great Britain
- Education: Imperial College London

Sport
- Sport: Water polo
Medal record
Representing England
Commonwealth Championships
Gold medal – first place	2014 Aberdeen	Team competition

Adam James Scholefield (born 24 May 1985) is a researcher and British water polo player.

He graduated from Imperial College London with a degree in electrical engineering and a Ph.D in image processing. He is 1.89 metres (6 ft 2 in) tall and weighs 99 kilograms (218 lb). He is coached by Cristian Iordache, Petik Attila and Norman Leighton.

Scholefield competed for Great Britain at the 2012 Summer Olympics in London in the men's tournament at the Water Polo Arena. It was the first time the Great Britain men's national water polo team appeared at an Olympics since the 1956 Games held in Melbourne, Australia. In 2014, he won a gold medal at the Commonwealth Water Polo Championships in Aberdeen.

Since June 2015, and as of March 2017, Scholefield is working, with Prof. Martin Vetterli, as a postdoctoral researcher at the École Polytechnique Fédérale de Lausanne.
