= Water polo at the 2016 Summer Olympics – Men's tournament =

Men's water polo at the Games of the XXXI Olympiad
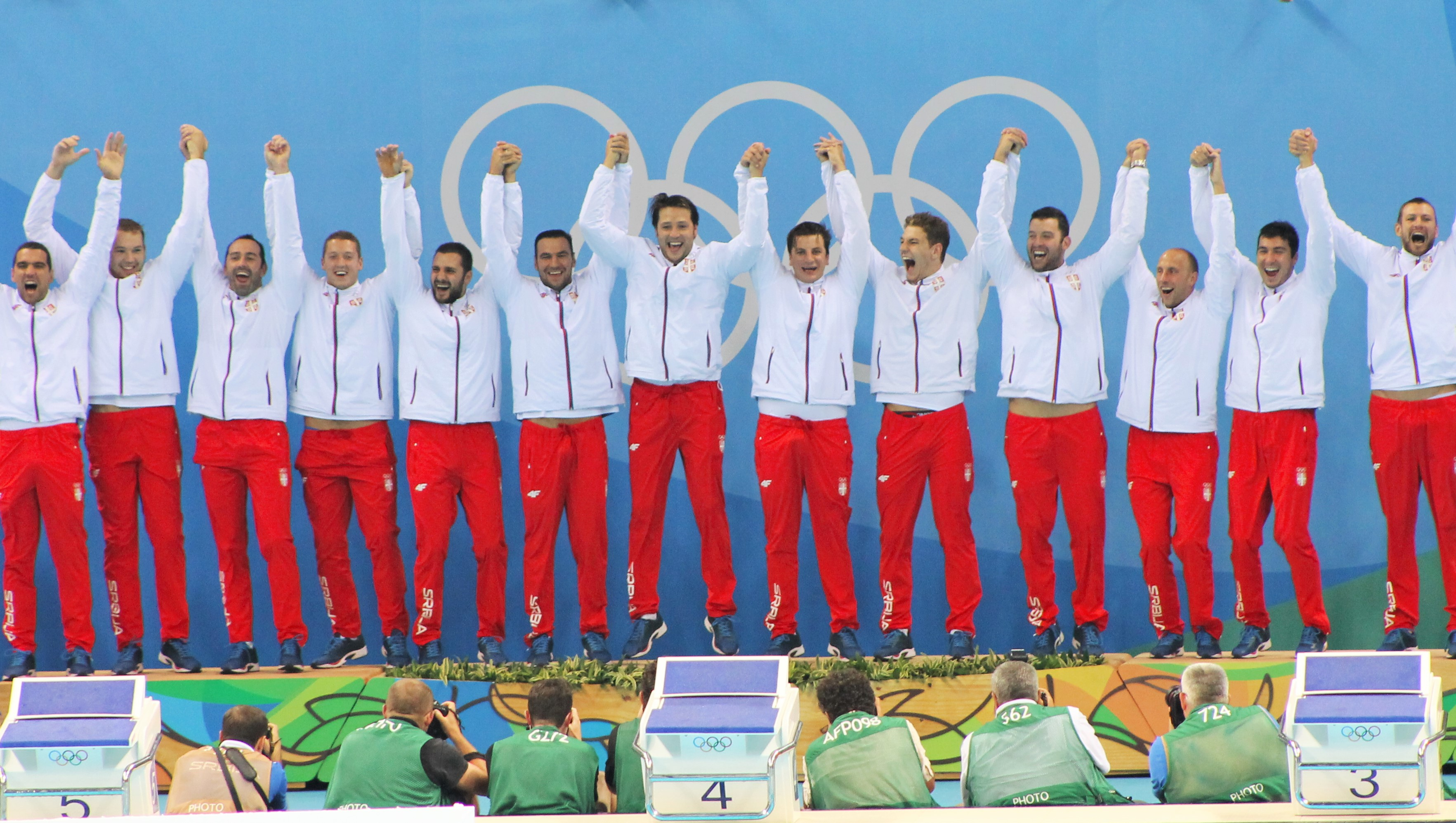
- Serbia national team celebrates after the gold medal match

Tournament details
- Host country: Brazil
- City: Rio de Janeiro
- Venue(s): Maria Lenk Aquatics Centre, Olympic Aquatics Stadium
- Dates: 6–20 August 2016
- Teams: 12 (from 4 confederations)
- Competitors: 154

Final positions
- Champions: Serbia (4th title)
- Runners-up: Croatia
- Third place: Italy
- Fourth place: Montenegro

Tournament statistics
- Matches: 42
- Goals scored: 704 (16.76 per match)
- Multiple appearances: 5-time Olympian(s): 2 players 4-time Olympian(s): 7 players
- Multiple medalists: 3-time medalist(s): 5 players
- Top scorer(s): (Serbia) Filip Filipović (Spain) Guillermo Molina (19 goals in 8 matches)
- Most saves: (Brazil) Slobodan Soro (81 saves in 8 matches)
- Top sprinter(s): (Australia) Rhys Howden (18 sprints won in 5 matches)
- MVP: (Serbia) Filip Filipović

The men's tournament of Water polo at the 2016 Summer Olympics at Rio de Janeiro, Brazil, began on 6 August and ended on 20 August 2016. Games were held at the Maria Lenk Aquatics Centre and the Olympic Aquatics Stadium.

Serbia won the gold medal by defeating Croatia in the final. Bronze was won by Italy after beating Montenegro. After the Rio Olympics, Serbia national team held Olympic Games, World Championship, European Championship, World Cup and World League titles simultaneously.

== Competition schedule ==
G	Group stage	¼	Quarter-finals	½	Semi-finals	B	Bronze medal match	F	Final

Sat 6	Sun 7	Mon 8	Tue 9	Wed 10	Thu 11	Fri 12	Sat 13	Sun 14	Mon 15	Tue 16	Wed 17	Thu 18	Fri 19	Sat 20	
G		G		G		G		G		¼		½		B	F

== Qualification ==
Qualification	Date	Host	Berths	Qualified
Host nation	2 October 2009	(Denmark) Copenhagen	1	Brazil
2015 FINA World League	23–28 June 2015	(Italy) Bergamo	1	Serbia
2015 Pan American Games	7–15 July 2015	(Canada) Toronto	1	United States
2015 FINA World Championships	27 July – 8 August 2015	(Russia) Kazan	2	Croatia
2015 FINA World Championships	27 July – 8 August 2015	(Russia) Kazan	2	Greece
Oceanian Continental Selection	19 October 2015	(Australia) Perth	1	Australia
2015 Asian Championship	16–20 December 2015	(China) Foshan	1	Japan
2016 European Championships	10–23 January 2016	(Serbia) Belgrade	1	Montenegro
World Qualification Tournament	3–10 April 2016	(Italy) Trieste	4	Hungary
World Qualification Tournament	3–10 April 2016	(Italy) Trieste	4	Italy
World Qualification Tournament	3–10 April 2016	(Italy) Trieste	4	Spain
World Qualification Tournament	3–10 April 2016	(Italy) Trieste	4	France
Total			12	

== Draw ==
The draw was held on 10 April 2016.

Teams from twelve nations compete in the tournament and were seeded into two groups for the preliminary round. The top four teams advance to the quarterfinals.

=== Seeding ===
The seeding was announced on 10 April 2016.

Pot 1	Pot 2	Pot 3	Pot 4	Pot 5	Pot 6
Serbia; Croatia	Greece; Montenegro	United States; Australia	France; Japan	Hungary; Italy	Spain; Brazil

== Referees ==
The following referees were selected for the tournament.

- (Argentina) German Moller
- (Australia) Daniel Flahive
- (Azerbaijan) Mark Koganov
- (Brazil) Fabio Toffoli
- (Canada) Marie-Claude Deslières
- (China) Ni Shi Wei
- (Croatia) Nenad Peris
- (Egypt) Hatem Gaber
- (France) Benjamin Mercier
- (Greece) Georgios Stavridis
- (Hungary) Péter Molnár
- (Iran) Masoud Rezvani
- (Italy) Filippo Gomez
- (Japan) Tadao Tahara
- (Montenegro) Stanko Ivanovski
- (Netherlands) Diana Dutilh-Dumas
- (Poland) Radosław Koryzna
- (Romania) Adrian Alexandrescu
- (Russia) Sergey Naumov
- (Serbia) Vojin Putniković
- (Slovenia) Boris Margeta
- (South Africa) Dion Willis
- (Spain) Francesc Buch
- (United States) Joseph Peila

== Group stage ==
=== Group A ===
Pos	Team	Pld	W	D	L	GF	GA	GD	Pts	Qualification
1	Hungary	5	2	3	0	57	43	+14	7	Quarter-finals
2	Greece	5	2	2	1	41	40	+1	6	Quarter-finals
3	Brazil (H)	5	3	0	2	40	39	+1	6	Quarter-finals
4	Serbia	5	2	2	1	49	44	+5	6	Quarter-finals
5	Australia	5	2	1	2	44	40	+4	5	
6	Japan	5	0	0	5	36	61	−25	0	

Source: Rio2016
Rules for classification: 1) Points; 2) Head-to-head points; 3) Head-to-head goal difference; 4) Head-to-head goals scored; 5) Goal difference.
(H) Hosts

6 August 2016; 09:00	Report	Serbia	13–13	Hungary	Maria Lenk Aquatic Center, Rio de Janeiro; Referees: Adrian Alexandrescu (ROU), Radosław Koryzna (POL)
6 August 2016; 09:00	Report	Score by quarters: 3–5, 3–4, 3–2, 4–2			Maria Lenk Aquatic Center, Rio de Janeiro; Referees: Adrian Alexandrescu (ROU), Radosław Koryzna (POL)
6 August 2016; 09:00	Report	Filipović 3	Goals	Hosnyánszky 3	Maria Lenk Aquatic Center, Rio de Janeiro; Referees: Adrian Alexandrescu (ROU), Radosław Koryzna (POL)

6 August 2016; 13:00	Report	Greece	8–7	Japan	Maria Lenk Aquatic Center, Rio de Janeiro; Referees: Sergey Naumov (RUS), Stanko Ivanovski (MNE)
6 August 2016; 13:00	Report	Score by quarters: 2–2, 2–1, 0–4, 4–0			Maria Lenk Aquatic Center, Rio de Janeiro; Referees: Sergey Naumov (RUS), Stanko Ivanovski (MNE)
6 August 2016; 13:00	Report	Vlachopoulos 3	Goals	three players 2	Maria Lenk Aquatic Center, Rio de Janeiro; Referees: Sergey Naumov (RUS), Stanko Ivanovski (MNE)

6 August 2016; 20:50	Report	Brazil	8–7	Australia	Maria Lenk Aquatic Center, Rio de Janeiro; Referees: Filippo Gomez (ITA), Francesc Buch (ESP)
6 August 2016; 20:50	Report	Score by quarters: 3–2, 2–1, 2–2, 1–2			Maria Lenk Aquatic Center, Rio de Janeiro; Referees: Filippo Gomez (ITA), Francesc Buch (ESP)
6 August 2016; 20:50	Report	Delgado 3	Goals	Campbell, Cotterill 2	Maria Lenk Aquatic Center, Rio de Janeiro; Referees: Filippo Gomez (ITA), Francesc Buch (ESP)

8 August 2016; 09:00	Report	Serbia	9–9	Greece	Maria Lenk Aquatic Center, Rio de Janeiro; Referees: Mark Koganov (AZE), Joseph Peila (USA)
8 August 2016; 09:00	Report	Score by quarters: 1–2, 0–2, 4–3, 4–2			Maria Lenk Aquatic Center, Rio de Janeiro; Referees: Mark Koganov (AZE), Joseph Peila (USA)
8 August 2016; 09:00	Report	Filipović 2	Goals	Fountoulis 4	Maria Lenk Aquatic Center, Rio de Janeiro; Referees: Mark Koganov (AZE), Joseph Peila (USA)

8 August 2016; 13:00	Report	Hungary	9–9	Australia	Maria Lenk Aquatic Center, Rio de Janeiro; Referees: Boris Margeta (SLO), Filippo Gomez (ITA)
8 August 2016; 13:00	Report	Score by quarters: 4–3, 2–2, 1–3, 2–1			Maria Lenk Aquatic Center, Rio de Janeiro; Referees: Boris Margeta (SLO), Filippo Gomez (ITA)
8 August 2016; 13:00	Report	three players 2	Goals	Campbell 4	Maria Lenk Aquatic Center, Rio de Janeiro; Referees: Boris Margeta (SLO), Filippo Gomez (ITA)

8 August 2016; 19:30	Report	Japan	8–16	Brazil	Maria Lenk Aquatic Center, Rio de Janeiro; Referees: Nenad Peris (CRO), Francesc Buch (ESP)
8 August 2016; 19:30	Report	Score by quarters: 2–5, 1–3, 4–4, 1–4			Maria Lenk Aquatic Center, Rio de Janeiro; Referees: Nenad Peris (CRO), Francesc Buch (ESP)
8 August 2016; 19:30	Report	three players 2	Goals	Vrlić 5	Maria Lenk Aquatic Center, Rio de Janeiro; Referees: Nenad Peris (CRO), Francesc Buch (ESP)

10 August 2016; 09:00	Report	Australia	8–6	Japan	Maria Lenk Aquatic Center, Rio de Janeiro; Referees: Francesc Buch (ESP), Joseph Peila (USA)
10 August 2016; 09:00	Report	Score by quarters: 1–2, 2–1, 3–2, 2–1			Maria Lenk Aquatic Center, Rio de Janeiro; Referees: Francesc Buch (ESP), Joseph Peila (USA)
10 August 2016; 09:00	Report	Kayes 4	Goals	Okawa, Takei 2	Maria Lenk Aquatic Center, Rio de Janeiro; Referees: Francesc Buch (ESP), Joseph Peila (USA)

10 August 2016; 10:20	Report	Greece	8–8	Hungary	Maria Lenk Aquatic Center, Rio de Janeiro; Referees: Nenad Peris (CRO), Mark Koganov (AZE)
10 August 2016; 10:20	Report	Score by quarters: 1–2, 1–1, 4–2, 2–3			Maria Lenk Aquatic Center, Rio de Janeiro; Referees: Nenad Peris (CRO), Mark Koganov (AZE)
10 August 2016; 10:20	Report	Vlachopoulos 3	Goals	Hárai 3	Maria Lenk Aquatic Center, Rio de Janeiro; Referees: Nenad Peris (CRO), Mark Koganov (AZE)

10 August 2016; 19:30	Report	Brazil	6–5	Serbia	Maria Lenk Aquatic Center, Rio de Janeiro; Referees: Benjamin Mercier (FRA), Ni Shi Wei (CHN)
10 August 2016; 19:30	Report	Score by quarters: 0–2, 3–1, 2–0, 1–2			Maria Lenk Aquatic Center, Rio de Janeiro; Referees: Benjamin Mercier (FRA), Ni Shi Wei (CHN)
10 August 2016; 19:30	Report	Vrlić 2	Goals	five players 1	Maria Lenk Aquatic Center, Rio de Janeiro; Referees: Benjamin Mercier (FRA), Ni Shi Wei (CHN)

12 August 2016; 09:00	Report	Hungary	17–7	Japan	Maria Lenk Aquatic Center, Rio de Janeiro; Referees: Stanko Ivanovski (MNE), Masoud Rezvani (IRI)
12 August 2016; 09:00	Report	Score by quarters: 5–1, 6–2, 2–2, 4–2			Maria Lenk Aquatic Center, Rio de Janeiro; Referees: Stanko Ivanovski (MNE), Masoud Rezvani (IRI)
12 August 2016; 09:00	Report	Kis 5	Goals	Takei 3	Maria Lenk Aquatic Center, Rio de Janeiro; Referees: Stanko Ivanovski (MNE), Masoud Rezvani (IRI)

12 August 2016; 19:30	Report	Greece	9–4	Brazil	Maria Lenk Aquatic Center, Rio de Janeiro; Referees: Boris Margeta (SLO), Sergey Naumov (RUS)
12 August 2016; 19:30	Report	Score by quarters: 3–1, 1–1, 3–2, 2–0			Maria Lenk Aquatic Center, Rio de Janeiro; Referees: Boris Margeta (SLO), Sergey Naumov (RUS)
12 August 2016; 19:30	Report	three players 2	Goals	Silva 2	Maria Lenk Aquatic Center, Rio de Janeiro; Referees: Boris Margeta (SLO), Sergey Naumov (RUS)

12 August 2016; 22:10	Report	Serbia	10–8	Australia	Maria Lenk Aquatic Center, Rio de Janeiro; Referees: Adrian Alexandrescu (ROU), Francesc Buch (ESP)
12 August 2016; 22:10	Report	Score by quarters: 2–2, 2–3, 2–1, 4–2			Maria Lenk Aquatic Center, Rio de Janeiro; Referees: Adrian Alexandrescu (ROU), Francesc Buch (ESP)
12 August 2016; 22:10	Report	three players 2	Goals	Cotterill 2	Maria Lenk Aquatic Center, Rio de Janeiro; Referees: Adrian Alexandrescu (ROU), Francesc Buch (ESP)

14 August 2016; 14:10	Report	Australia	12–7	Greece	Olympic Aquatics Stadium, Rio de Janeiro; Referees: Filippo Gomez (ITA), Joseph Peila (USA)
14 August 2016; 14:10	Report	Score by quarters: 5–3, 5–1, 0–1, 2–2			Olympic Aquatics Stadium, Rio de Janeiro; Referees: Filippo Gomez (ITA), Joseph Peila (USA)
14 August 2016; 14:10	Report	Cotterill, Howden 3	Goals	Fountoulis 3	Olympic Aquatics Stadium, Rio de Janeiro; Referees: Filippo Gomez (ITA), Joseph Peila (USA)

14 August 2016; 19:30	Report	Serbia	12–8	Japan	Olympic Aquatics Stadium, Rio de Janeiro; Referees: Nenad Peris (CRO), Benjamin Mercier (FRA)
14 August 2016; 19:30	Report	Score by quarters: 2–5, 3–0, 4–2, 3–1			Olympic Aquatics Stadium, Rio de Janeiro; Referees: Nenad Peris (CRO), Benjamin Mercier (FRA)
14 August 2016; 19:30	Report	Filipović 6	Goals	Takei 5	Olympic Aquatics Stadium, Rio de Janeiro; Referees: Nenad Peris (CRO), Benjamin Mercier (FRA)

14 August 2016; 20:50	Report	Brazil	6–10	Hungary	Olympic Aquatics Stadium, Rio de Janeiro; Referees: Francesc Buch (ESP), Stanko Ivanovski (MNE)
14 August 2016; 20:50	Report	Score by quarters: 0–3, 1–2, 3–3, 2–2			Olympic Aquatics Stadium, Rio de Janeiro; Referees: Francesc Buch (ESP), Stanko Ivanovski (MNE)
14 August 2016; 20:50	Report	Gomes, Perrone 2	Goals	three players 2	Olympic Aquatics Stadium, Rio de Janeiro; Referees: Francesc Buch (ESP), Stanko Ivanovski (MNE)

=== Group B ===
Pos	Team	Pld	W	D	L	GF	GA	GD	Pts	Qualification
1	Spain	5	3	1	1	46	35	+11	7	Quarter-finals
2	Croatia	5	3	0	2	37	37	0	6	Quarter-finals
3	Italy	5	3	0	2	40	41	−1	6	Quarter-finals
4	Montenegro	5	2	1	2	36	32	+4	5	Quarter-finals
5	United States	5	2	0	3	35	35	0	4	
6	France	5	1	0	4	28	42	−14	2	

Source: Rio2016
Rules for classification: 1) Points; 2) Head-to-head points; 3) Head-to-head goal difference; 4) Head-to-head goals scored; 5) Goal difference.

6 August 2016; 10:20	Report	United States	5–7	Croatia	Maria Lenk Aquatic Center, Rio de Janeiro; Referees: Boris Margeta (SLO), Daniel Flahive (AUS)
6 August 2016; 10:20	Report	Score by quarters: 2–2, 1–1, 1–2, 1–2			Maria Lenk Aquatic Center, Rio de Janeiro; Referees: Boris Margeta (SLO), Daniel Flahive (AUS)
6 August 2016; 10:20	Report	Azevedo 2	Goals	Joković, Šetka 2	Maria Lenk Aquatic Center, Rio de Janeiro; Referees: Boris Margeta (SLO), Daniel Flahive (AUS)

6 August 2016; 11:40	Report	Spain	8–9	Italy	Maria Lenk Aquatic Center, Rio de Janeiro; Referees: Vojin Putniković (SRB), Georgios Stavridis (GRE)
6 August 2016; 11:40	Report	Score by quarters: 3–2, 2–1, 1–2, 2–4			Maria Lenk Aquatic Center, Rio de Janeiro; Referees: Vojin Putniković (SRB), Georgios Stavridis (GRE)
6 August 2016; 11:40	Report	Molina 4	Goals	Figlioli, Presciutti 3	Maria Lenk Aquatic Center, Rio de Janeiro; Referees: Vojin Putniković (SRB), Georgios Stavridis (GRE)

6 August 2016; 19:30	Report	France	4–7	Montenegro	Maria Lenk Aquatic Center, Rio de Janeiro; Referees: Mark Koganov (AZE), Péter Molnár (HUN)
6 August 2016; 19:30	Report	Score by quarters: 0–2, 0–3, 1–0, 3–2			Maria Lenk Aquatic Center, Rio de Janeiro; Referees: Mark Koganov (AZE), Péter Molnár (HUN)
6 August 2016; 19:30	Report	four players 1	Goals	Radović 3	Maria Lenk Aquatic Center, Rio de Janeiro; Referees: Mark Koganov (AZE), Péter Molnár (HUN)

8 August 2016; 10:20	Report	Italy	11–8	France	Maria Lenk Aquatic Center, Rio de Janeiro; Referees: Radosław Koryzna (POL), Sergey Naumov (RUS)
8 August 2016; 10:20	Report	Score by quarters: 4–3, 4–1, 1–2, 2–2			Maria Lenk Aquatic Center, Rio de Janeiro; Referees: Radosław Koryzna (POL), Sergey Naumov (RUS)
8 August 2016; 10:20	Report	Aicardi 4	Goals	three players 2	Maria Lenk Aquatic Center, Rio de Janeiro; Referees: Radosław Koryzna (POL), Sergey Naumov (RUS)

8 August 2016; 11:40	Report	United States	9–10	Spain	Maria Lenk Aquatic Center, Rio de Janeiro; Referees: Adrian Alexandrescu (ROU), Péter Molnár (HUN)
8 August 2016; 11:40	Report	Score by quarters: 2–4, 3–1, 2–3, 2–2			Maria Lenk Aquatic Center, Rio de Janeiro; Referees: Adrian Alexandrescu (ROU), Péter Molnár (HUN)
8 August 2016; 11:40	Report	Bonanni 4	Goals	Echenique 3	Maria Lenk Aquatic Center, Rio de Janeiro; Referees: Adrian Alexandrescu (ROU), Péter Molnár (HUN)

8 August 2016; 20:50	Report	Croatia	8–7	Montenegro	Maria Lenk Aquatic Center, Rio de Janeiro; Referees: Georgios Stavridis (GRE), Daniel Flahive (AUS)
8 August 2016; 20:50	Report	Score by quarters: 2–2, 2–1, 1–2, 3–2			Maria Lenk Aquatic Center, Rio de Janeiro; Referees: Georgios Stavridis (GRE), Daniel Flahive (AUS)
8 August 2016; 20:50	Report	three players 2	Goals	Brguljan, Janović 2	Maria Lenk Aquatic Center, Rio de Janeiro; Referees: Georgios Stavridis (GRE), Daniel Flahive (AUS)

10 August 2016; 11:40	Report	France	3–6	United States	Maria Lenk Aquatic Center, Rio de Janeiro; Referees: German Moller (ARG), Adrian Alexandrescu (ROU)
10 August 2016; 11:40	Report	Score by quarters: 1–1, 0–4, 0–0, 2–1			Maria Lenk Aquatic Center, Rio de Janeiro; Referees: German Moller (ARG), Adrian Alexandrescu (ROU)
10 August 2016; 11:40	Report	three players 1	Goals	Samuels 3	Maria Lenk Aquatic Center, Rio de Janeiro; Referees: German Moller (ARG), Adrian Alexandrescu (ROU)

10 August 2016; 13:00	Report	Montenegro	5–6	Italy	Maria Lenk Aquatic Center, Rio de Janeiro; Referees: Péter Molnár (HUN), Georgios Stavridis (GRE)
10 August 2016; 13:00	Report	Score by quarters: 1–2, 1–1, 0–1, 3–2			Maria Lenk Aquatic Center, Rio de Janeiro; Referees: Péter Molnár (HUN), Georgios Stavridis (GRE)
10 August 2016; 13:00	Report	Brguljan 2	Goals	Di Fulvio 3	Maria Lenk Aquatic Center, Rio de Janeiro; Referees: Péter Molnár (HUN), Georgios Stavridis (GRE)

10 August 2016; 20:50	Report	Spain	9–4	Croatia	Maria Lenk Aquatic Center, Rio de Janeiro; Referees: Boris Margeta (SLO), Radosław Koryzna (POL)
10 August 2016; 20:50	Report	Score by quarters: 2–0, 2–1, 1–2, 4–1			Maria Lenk Aquatic Center, Rio de Janeiro; Referees: Boris Margeta (SLO), Radosław Koryzna (POL)
10 August 2016; 20:50	Report	Echenique 4	Goals	four players 1	Maria Lenk Aquatic Center, Rio de Janeiro; Referees: Boris Margeta (SLO), Radosław Koryzna (POL)

12 August 2016; 10:20	Report	Croatia	10–7	Italy	Maria Lenk Aquatic Center, Rio de Janeiro; Referees: Mark Koganov (AZE), Daniel Flahive (AUS)
12 August 2016; 10:20	Report	Score by quarters: 1–1, 4–3, 3–2, 2–1			Maria Lenk Aquatic Center, Rio de Janeiro; Referees: Mark Koganov (AZE), Daniel Flahive (AUS)
12 August 2016; 10:20	Report	Sukno 5	Goals	Gallo 2	Maria Lenk Aquatic Center, Rio de Janeiro; Referees: Mark Koganov (AZE), Daniel Flahive (AUS)

12 August 2016; 11:40	Report	United States	5–8	Montenegro	Maria Lenk Aquatic Center, Rio de Janeiro; Referees: Radosław Koryzna (POL), Georgios Stavridis (GRE)
12 August 2016; 11:40	Report	Score by quarters: 1–2, 0–0, 2–2, 2–4			Maria Lenk Aquatic Center, Rio de Janeiro; Referees: Radosław Koryzna (POL), Georgios Stavridis (GRE)
12 August 2016; 11:40	Report	Samuels 2	Goals	Da. Brguljan 2	Maria Lenk Aquatic Center, Rio de Janeiro; Referees: Radosław Koryzna (POL), Georgios Stavridis (GRE)

12 August 2016; 20:50	Report	Spain	10–4	France	Maria Lenk Aquatic Center, Rio de Janeiro; Referees: Fabio Toffoli (BRA), Péter Molnár (HUN)
12 August 2016; 20:50	Report	Score by quarters: 3–1, 3–0, 1–1, 3-2			Maria Lenk Aquatic Center, Rio de Janeiro; Referees: Fabio Toffoli (BRA), Péter Molnár (HUN)
12 August 2016; 20:50	Report	Echenique 3	Goals	Crousillat 2	Maria Lenk Aquatic Center, Rio de Janeiro; Referees: Fabio Toffoli (BRA), Péter Molnár (HUN)

14 August 2016; 12:50	Report	Montenegro	9–9	Spain	Olympic Aquatics Stadium, Rio de Janeiro; Referees: Sergey Naumov (RUS), Radosław Koryzna (POL)
14 August 2016; 12:50	Report	Score by quarters: 2–2, 3–2, 2–4, 2–1			Olympic Aquatics Stadium, Rio de Janeiro; Referees: Sergey Naumov (RUS), Radosław Koryzna (POL)
14 August 2016; 12:50	Report	three players 2	Goals	Molina 2	Olympic Aquatics Stadium, Rio de Janeiro; Referees: Sergey Naumov (RUS), Radosław Koryzna (POL)

14 August 2016; 15:30	Report	United States	10–7	Italy	Olympic Aquatics Stadium, Rio de Janeiro; Referees: Boris Margeta (SLO), Vojin Putniković (SRB)
14 August 2016; 15:30	Report	Score by quarters: 2–4, 3–2, 3–1, 2–0			Olympic Aquatics Stadium, Rio de Janeiro; Referees: Boris Margeta (SLO), Vojin Putniković (SRB)
14 August 2016; 15:30	Report	four players 2	Goals	Di Fulvio, Figlioli 2	Olympic Aquatics Stadium, Rio de Janeiro; Referees: Boris Margeta (SLO), Vojin Putniković (SRB)

14 August 2016; 16:50	Report	France	9–8	Croatia	Olympic Aquatics Stadium, Rio de Janeiro; Referees: Ni Shi Wei (CHN), Hatem Gaber (EGY)
14 August 2016; 16:50	Report	Score by quarters: 3–2, 3–3, 2–1, 1–2			Olympic Aquatics Stadium, Rio de Janeiro; Referees: Ni Shi Wei (CHN), Hatem Gaber (EGY)
14 August 2016; 16:50	Report	Marzouki 3	Goals	Sukno 3	Olympic Aquatics Stadium, Rio de Janeiro; Referees: Ni Shi Wei (CHN), Hatem Gaber (EGY)

== Knockout stage ==
=== Bracket ===
Quarter-finals
16 August
Hungary	9 (2)
Montenegro (pen.)	9 (4)
16 August
Brazil	6
Croatia	10
16 August
Greece	5
Italy	9
16 August
Serbia	10
Spain	7

Semi-finals
18 August
Montenegro	8
Croatia	12
18 August
Italy	8
Serbia	10

Gold medal
20 August
Croatia	7
Serbia	11
Bronze medal
20 August
Montenegro	10
Italy	12

5th place bracket

5–8th place semifinals
18 August
Hungary	13
Brazil	4
18 August
Greece	9
Spain	7

Fifth place
20 August
Hungary	12
Greece	10
Seventh place
20 August
Brazil	8
Spain	9

=== Quarter-finals ===
16 August 2016; 11:00	Report	Hungary	9–9; PSO: 2–4	Montenegro	Olympic Aquatics Stadium, Rio de Janeiro; Referees: Mark Koganov (AZE), Joseph Peila (USA)
16 August 2016; 11:00	Report	Score by quarters: 1–2, 2–3, 3–3, 3–1			Olympic Aquatics Stadium, Rio de Janeiro; Referees: Mark Koganov (AZE), Joseph Peila (USA)
16 August 2016; 11:00	Report	Erdélyi, Vámos 3	Goals	Ivović 3	Olympic Aquatics Stadium, Rio de Janeiro; Referees: Mark Koganov (AZE), Joseph Peila (USA)

16 August 2016; 12:20	Report	Serbia	10–7	Spain	Olympic Aquatics Stadium, Rio de Janeiro; Referees: Radosław Koryzna (POL), Daniel Flahive (AUS)
16 August 2016; 12:20	Report	Score by quarters: 3–1, 4–2, 0–2, 3–2			Olympic Aquatics Stadium, Rio de Janeiro; Referees: Radosław Koryzna (POL), Daniel Flahive (AUS)
16 August 2016; 12:20	Report	Mandić 4	Goals	Molina 3	Olympic Aquatics Stadium, Rio de Janeiro; Referees: Radosław Koryzna (POL), Daniel Flahive (AUS)

16 August 2016; 15:10	Report	Brazil	6–10	Croatia	Olympic Aquatics Stadium, Rio de Janeiro; Referees: Adrian Alexandrescu (ROU), Benjamin Mercier (FRA)
16 August 2016; 15:10	Report	Score by quarters: 2–3, 1–4, 3–1, 0–2			Olympic Aquatics Stadium, Rio de Janeiro; Referees: Adrian Alexandrescu (ROU), Benjamin Mercier (FRA)
16 August 2016; 15:10	Report	Gomes 3	Goals	García, Joković 3	Olympic Aquatics Stadium, Rio de Janeiro; Referees: Adrian Alexandrescu (ROU), Benjamin Mercier (FRA)

16 August 2016; 16:30	Report	Greece	5–9	Italy	Olympic Aquatics Stadium, Rio de Janeiro; Referees: Sergey Naumov (RUS), Boris Margeta (SLO)
16 August 2016; 16:30	Report	Score by quarters: 0–2, 2–2, 1–2, 2–3			Olympic Aquatics Stadium, Rio de Janeiro; Referees: Sergey Naumov (RUS), Boris Margeta (SLO)
16 August 2016; 16:30	Report	Fountoulis, Mourikis 2	Goals	Figlioli 3	Olympic Aquatics Stadium, Rio de Janeiro; Referees: Sergey Naumov (RUS), Boris Margeta (SLO)

=== 5–8th place semifinals ===
18 August 2016; 11:00	Report	Hungary	13–4	Brazil	Olympic Aquatics Stadium, Rio de Janeiro; Referees: Filippo Gomez (ITA), Masoud Rezvani (IRI)
18 August 2016; 11:00	Report	Score by quarters: 4–1, 3–0, 4–3, 2–0			Olympic Aquatics Stadium, Rio de Janeiro; Referees: Filippo Gomez (ITA), Masoud Rezvani (IRI)
18 August 2016; 11:00	Report	Erdélyi 4	Goals	Delgado 2	Olympic Aquatics Stadium, Rio de Janeiro; Referees: Filippo Gomez (ITA), Masoud Rezvani (IRI)

18 August 2016; 15:10	Report	Greece	9–7	Spain	Olympic Aquatics Stadium, Rio de Janeiro; Referees: Boris Margeta (SLO), Nenad Peris (CRO)
18 August 2016; 15:10	Report	Score by quarters: 1–0, 2–1, 4–3, 2–3			Olympic Aquatics Stadium, Rio de Janeiro; Referees: Boris Margeta (SLO), Nenad Peris (CRO)
18 August 2016; 15:10	Report	Afroudakis, Mourikis 2	Goals	Molina 4	Olympic Aquatics Stadium, Rio de Janeiro; Referees: Boris Margeta (SLO), Nenad Peris (CRO)

=== Semi-finals ===
18 August 2016; 12:20	Report	Montenegro	8–12	Croatia	Olympic Aquatics Stadium, Rio de Janeiro; Referees: Adrian Alexandrescu (ROU), Joseph Peila (USA)
18 August 2016; 12:20	Report	Score by quarters: 3–4, 2–3, 1–1, 2–4			Olympic Aquatics Stadium, Rio de Janeiro; Referees: Adrian Alexandrescu (ROU), Joseph Peila (USA)
18 August 2016; 12:20	Report	Brguljan, Ivović 3	Goals	Bušlje 4	Olympic Aquatics Stadium, Rio de Janeiro; Referees: Adrian Alexandrescu (ROU), Joseph Peila (USA)

18 August 2016; 16:30	Report	Italy	8–10	Serbia	Olympic Aquatics Stadium, Rio de Janeiro; Referees: Georgios Stavridis (GRE), Daniel Flahive (AUS)
18 August 2016; 16:30	Report	Score by quarters: 0–3, 2–3, 0–1, 6–3			Olympic Aquatics Stadium, Rio de Janeiro; Referees: Georgios Stavridis (GRE), Daniel Flahive (AUS)
18 August 2016; 16:30	Report	three players 2	Goals	three players 2	Olympic Aquatics Stadium, Rio de Janeiro; Referees: Georgios Stavridis (GRE), Daniel Flahive (AUS)

=== Seventh place game ===
20 August 2016; 11:40	Report	Brazil	8–9	Spain	Olympic Aquatics Stadium, Rio de Janeiro; Referees: Vojin Putniković (SRB), Stanko Ivanovski (MNE)
20 August 2016; 11:40	Report	Score by quarters: 1–3, 2–1, 1–2, 4–3			Olympic Aquatics Stadium, Rio de Janeiro; Referees: Vojin Putniković (SRB), Stanko Ivanovski (MNE)
20 August 2016; 11:40	Report	three players 2	Goals	three players 2	Olympic Aquatics Stadium, Rio de Janeiro; Referees: Vojin Putniković (SRB), Stanko Ivanovski (MNE)

=== Fifth place game ===
20 August 2016; 16:30	Report	Hungary	12–10	Greece	Olympic Aquatics Stadium, Rio de Janeiro; Referees: Mark Koganov (AZE), Joseph Peila (USA)
20 August 2016; 16:30	Report	Score by quarters: 2–1, 4–4, 3–3, 3–2			Olympic Aquatics Stadium, Rio de Janeiro; Referees: Mark Koganov (AZE), Joseph Peila (USA)
20 August 2016; 16:30	Report	Kis, Zalánki 3	Goals	four players 2	Olympic Aquatics Stadium, Rio de Janeiro; Referees: Mark Koganov (AZE), Joseph Peila (USA)

=== Bronze medal game ===
20 August 2016; 13:00	Report	Montenegro	10–12	Italy	Olympic Aquatics Stadium, Rio de Janeiro; Referees: Boris Margeta (SLO), Sergey Naumov (RUS)
20 August 2016; 13:00	Report	Score by quarters: 1–2, 3–3, 2–4, 4–3			Olympic Aquatics Stadium, Rio de Janeiro; Referees: Boris Margeta (SLO), Sergey Naumov (RUS)
20 August 2016; 13:00	Report	Janović 3	Goals	C. Presciutti 4	Olympic Aquatics Stadium, Rio de Janeiro; Referees: Boris Margeta (SLO), Sergey Naumov (RUS)

=== Gold medal game ===
20 August 2016; 17:50	Report	Croatia	7–11	Serbia	Olympic Aquatics Stadium, Rio de Janeiro; Referees: Georgios Stavridis (GRE), Péter Molnár (HUN)
20 August 2016; 17:50	Report	Score by quarters: 2–3, 1–3, 2–3, 2–2			Olympic Aquatics Stadium, Rio de Janeiro; Referees: Georgios Stavridis (GRE), Péter Molnár (HUN)
20 August 2016; 17:50	Report	Sukno 3	Goals	Mandić 4	Olympic Aquatics Stadium, Rio de Janeiro; Referees: Georgios Stavridis (GRE), Péter Molnár (HUN)

== Final ranking ==
Rank	Team
1st place, gold medalist(s)	Serbia
2nd place, silver medalist(s)	Croatia
3rd place, bronze medalist(s)	Italy
4	Montenegro
5	Hungary
6	Greece
7	Spain
8	Brazil
9	Australia
10	United States
11	France
12	Japan

2016 Men's Olympic champions

Serbia
Fourth title

== Medalists ==
Gold	Silver	Bronze
Serbia Gojko Pijetlović (GK); Dušan Mandić (LH); Živko Gocić (C); Sava Ranđelović; Miloš Ćuk; Duško Pijetlović; Slobodan Nikić; Milan Aleksić; Nikola Jakšić; Filip Filipović (LH); Andrija Prlainović; Stefan Mitrović; Branislav Mitrović (GK) Head coach: Dejan Savić	Croatia Josip Pavić (C, GK); Damir Burić; Antonio Petković; Luka Lončar; Maro Joković (LH); Luka Bukić; Marko Macan; Andro Bušlje; Sandro Sukno; Ivan Krapić; Anđelo Šetka; Xavier García (LH); Marko Bijač (GK) Head coach: Ivica Tucak	Italy Stefano Tempesti (C, GK); Francesco Di Fulvio; Niccolò Gitto; Pietro Figlioli; Andrea Fondelli; Alessandro Velotto; Alessandro Nora (LH); Valentino Gallo (LH); Christian Presciutti; Michaël Bodegas; Matteo Aicardi; Nicholas Presciutti; Marco Del Lungo (GK) Head coach: Alessandro Campagna

== Statistics ==
=== Multi-time Olympians ===
Five-time Olympian(s): 2 players

- Italy: Stefano Tempesti (GK)
- United States: Tony Azevedo

Four-time Olympian(s): 7 players

- Croatia: Damir Burić, Xavier García
- Greece: Christos Afroudakis
- Italy: Pietro Figlioli
- Montenegro: Predrag Jokić
- Spain: Guillermo Molina
- United States: Jesse Smith

=== Multiple medalists ===
Three-time Olympic medalist(s): 5 players

- Serbia: Filip Filipović, Živko Gocić, Slobodan Nikić, Duško Pijetlović, Andrija Prlainović

=== Leading goalscorers ===
Rank	Player	Team	Goals	Matches played	Goals per match	Shots	%
1	Filip Filipović	Serbia	19	8	2.375	44	43.2%
1	Guillermo Molina	Spain	19	8	2.375	50	38.0%
3	Sandro Sukno	Croatia	17	8	2.125	45	37.8%
4	Draško Brguljan	Montenegro	15	8	1.875	32	46.9%
5	Pietro Figlioli	Italy	14	8	1.750	38	36.8%
5	Ioannis Fountoulis	Greece	14	8	1.750	40	35.0%
5	Christian Presciutti	Italy	14	8	1.750	31	45.2%
5	Koji Takei	Japan	14	5	2.800	42	33.3%
5	Márton Vámos	Hungary	14	8	1.750	30	46.7%
5	Dénes Varga	Hungary	14	8	1.750	35	40.0%

Source: Official Results Book (page 100)

=== Leading goalkeepers ===
Rank	Goalkeeper	Team	Saves	Matches played	Saves per match	Shots	%
1	Slobodan Soro	Brazil	81	8	10.125	152	53.3%
2	Viktor Nagy	Hungary	67	8	8.375	118	56.8%
3	Daniel López	Spain	63	8	7.875	115	54.8%
4	Branislav Mitrović	Serbia	60	8	7.500	119	50.4%
5	Marko Bijač	Croatia	57	8	7.125	98	58.2%
6	Konstantinos Flegkas	Greece	56	8	7.000	120	46.7%
7	Miloš Šćepanović	Montenegro	52	8	6.500	102	51.0%
7	Katsuyuki Tanamura	Japan	52	5	10.400	113	46.0%
9	Stefano Tempesti	Italy	51	8	6.375	101	50.5%
10	Rémi Garsau	France	46	5	9.200	88	52.3%

Source: Official Results Book (page 102)

=== Leading sprinters ===
Rank	Sprinter	Team	Sprints won	Matches played	Sprints won per match	Sprints contested	%
1	Rhys Howden	Australia	18	5	3.600	19	94.7%
2	Francesco Di Fulvio	Italy	16	8	2.000	17	94.1%
3	Pietro Figlioli	Italy	14	8	1.750	15	93.3%
4	Balázs Erdélyi	Hungary	12	8	1.500	17	70.6%
5	Vjekoslav Pasković	Montenegro	10	8	1.250	18	55.6%
6	Gonzalo Echenique	Spain	8	8	1.000	14	57.1%
6	Konstantinos Genidounias	Greece	8	8	1.000	18	44.4%
6	Anđelo Šetka	Croatia	8	8	1.000	14	57.1%
9	Krisztián Manhercz	Hungary	7	8	0.875	10	70.0%
9	Josh Samuels	United States	7	5	1.400	12	58.3%

Source: Official Results Book (page 99)

== Awards ==
The men's all-star team was announced on 20 August 2016.

Most Valuable Player

- (Serbia) Filip Filipović (left-handed, 19 goals)

Media All-Star Team

- Goalkeeper
  - (Croatia) Marko Bijač (57 saves)
- Field players
  - (Montenegro) Darko Brguljan (15 goals)
  - (Serbia) Filip Filipović (left-handed, 19 goals)
  - (Spain) Guillermo Molina (19 goals, 1 sprints won)
  - (Serbia) Slobodan Nikić (centre forward, 10 goals)
  - (Italy) Christian Presciutti (14 goals)
  - (Croatia) Sandro Sukno (17 goals, 3 sprints won)

== See also ==
- Water polo at the 2016 Summer Olympics – Women's tournament

== Sources ==
- PDF documents in the Olympic World Library:
  - Official Results Book – 2016 Olympic Games – Water Polo (archive)
- Water polo on the Olympedia website
  - Water polo at the 2016 Summer Olympics (men's tournament)
- Water polo on the Sports Reference website
  - Water polo at the 2016 Summer Games (men's tournament) (archived)
