= Bernardo Gomes (water polo) =

Brazilian water polo player

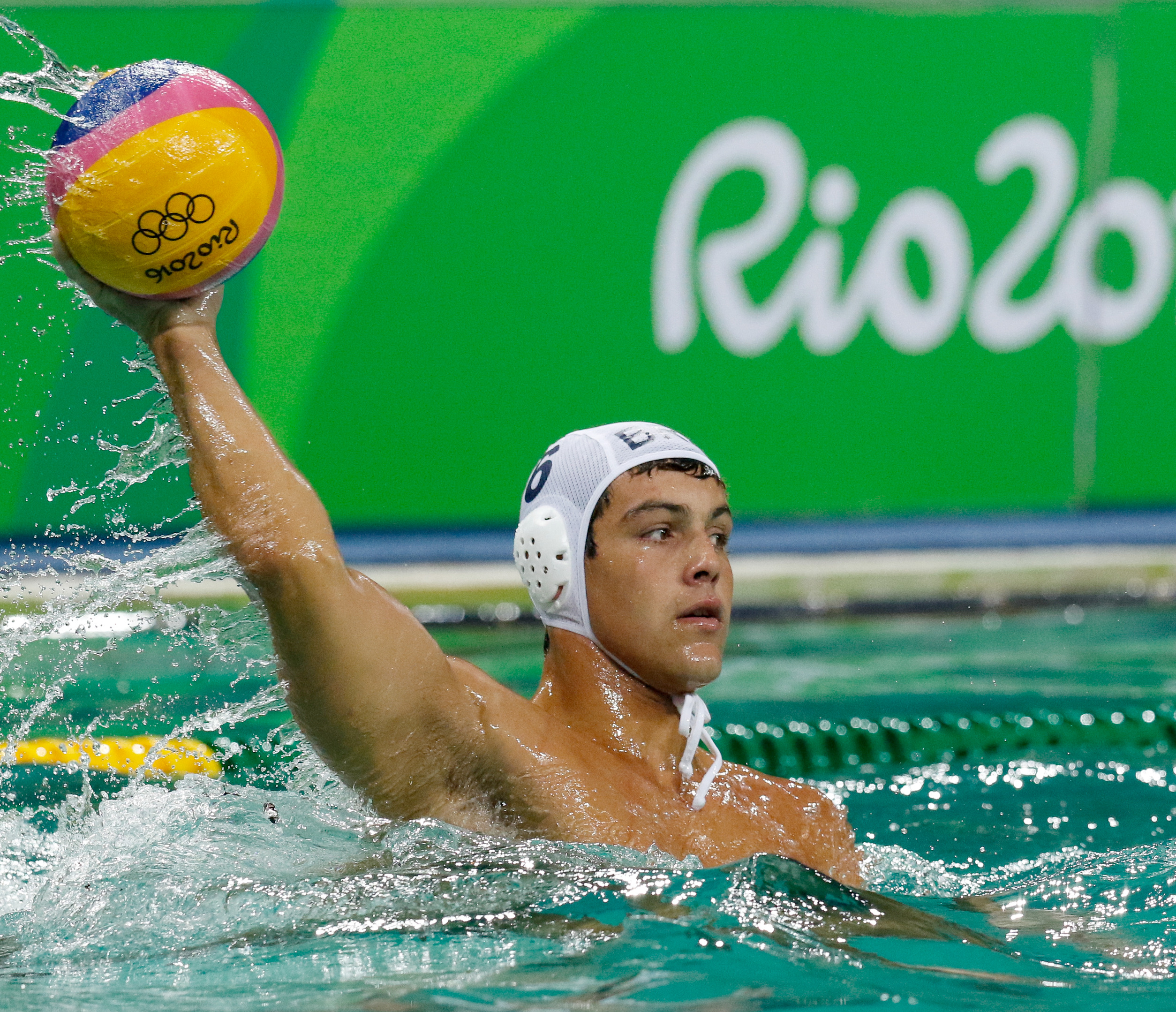
- Gomes in 2016

Personal information
- Born: 12 November 1993 (age 32)
- Height: 191 cm (6 ft 3 in)
- Weight: 98 kg (216 lb)

Sport
- Sport: Water polo
- Club: Botafogo
Medal record
Representing Brazil
Pan American Games
Silver medal – second place	2015 Toronto	Team

Bernardo Oneto Gomes (born 12 November 1993) is a water polo player from Brazil. He was part of the Brazilian team at the 2016 Summer Olympics, where the team was eliminated in the quarterfinals.
