= Great Britain men's national water polo team =

Great Britain
- FINA code: GBR
- Association: British Swimming
- Confederation: LEN (Europe)
- Head coach: (Romania) Cristian Iordache

FINA ranking (since 2008)
- Highest: 12 (2012)

Olympic Games (team statistics)
- Appearances: 11 (first in 1900)
- Best result: (gold) (1908, 1912, 1920)

World Championship
- Appearances: 1 (first in 1973)
- Best result: 15th place (1973)

Media
- Website: britishswimming.org

The Great Britain men's national water polo team is the representative for Great Britain in international men's water polo. The team has participated in eleven tournaments at the Summer Olympics, being the dominant team in the sport in the early twentieth century, with four Olympic titles. The only major competition they have ever qualified for was the first world championships in 1973. They qualified for the London 2012 Olympics by virtue of their representing the host country.

== Results ==
=== Olympic Games ===
- 1900 —
- 1908 — (gold) Gold medal
- 1912 — (gold) Gold medal
- 1920 — (gold) Gold medal
- 1924 — 1st round (8th place)
- 1928 — 4th place
- 1936 — 8th place
- 1948 — First round (13th place)
- 1952 — Second round (12th place)
- 1956 — 7th place
- 2012 — 12th place

=== World Championship ===
- 1973 — 15th place

== Current roster ==
The following is the British roster in the men's water polo tournament of the 2012 Summer Olympics.

| № | Name | Pos. | Height | Weight | Date of birth | 2012 club |
|---|---|---|---|---|---|---|
| 1 | Edward Scott | GK | 1.97 m (6 ft 6 in) | 85 kg (187 lb) | 28 May 1988 | (Spain) CE Mediterrani |
| 2 | Ciaran James | D | 1.93 m (6 ft 4 in) | 93 kg (205 lb) | 5 July 1991 | (Germany) SV Cannstatt |
| 3 | Glen Robinson | D | 1.88 m (6 ft 2 in) | 90 kg (198 lb) | 26 January 1989 | (Germany) SV Wurzburg 05 |
| 4 | Sean King | D | 1.93 m (6 ft 4 in) | 91 kg (201 lb) | 3 May 1989 | (Germany) SV Weiden |
| 5 | Craig Figes | D | 1.83 m (6 ft 0 in) | 90 kg (198 lb) | 14 August 1978 | (Italy) Pescara |
| 6 | Jack Waller | CF | 1.87 m (6 ft 2 in) | 95 kg (209 lb) | 6 October 1989 | (Spain) CN Sant Andreu |
| 7 | Alexander Parsonage | D | 1.80 m (5 ft 11 in) | 87 kg (192 lb) | 30 April 1985 | (Netherlands) UZSC |
| 8 | Jake Vincent | CB | 1.97 m (6 ft 6 in) | 98 kg (216 lb) | 24 June 1989 | (Germany) SV Bayer Uerdingen |
| 9 | Robert Parker | CB | 2.00 m (6 ft 7 in) | 100 kg (220 lb) | 4 December 1987 | (Spain) CN Terrassa |
| 10 | Adam Scholefield | CF | 1.89 m (6 ft 2 in) | 99 kg (218 lb) | 24 May 1985 | (Hungary) PVSK |
| 11 | Sean Ryder | D | 1.88 m (6 ft 2 in) | 94 kg (207 lb) | 18 June 1987 | (Germany) SV Weiden |
| 12 | Joseph O’Regan | CB | 2.03 m (6 ft 8 in) | 104 kg (229 lb) | 22 June 1991 | (Hungary) PVSK |
| 13 | Matthew Holland | GK | 1.94 m (6 ft 4 in) | 96 kg (212 lb) | 22 June 1989 | (France) Aix-en-Provence |

Head coach: Cristian Iordache

  - Harry Fitton of SV Bayer Uerdingen withdrew from the squad on game day 1 due to shoulder injury**

== See also ==
- Great Britain men's Olympic water polo team records and statistics
- List of Olympic champions in men's water polo
- List of men's Olympic water polo tournament records and statistics
- Great Britain women's national water polo team
- Great Britain Water Polo Juniors
