= Alexander Parsonage (water polo) =

British water polo player

Personal information
- Born: 30 May 1985 (age 40); Dudley, Great Britain

Sport
- Sport: Water polo

Alexander Parsonage (born 30 May 1985) is a British water polo player. At the 2012 Summer Olympics, he competed for the Great Britain men's national water polo team in the men's event. He is 5 feet 11 inches (1.80 metres) tall and weighs 192 pounds (87 kilograms).

== Personal life ==
Alexander Parsonage was born on 30 April or May 1985 in Dudley, West Midlands, England. He is 5 feet 11 inches (1.80 metres) tall. Parsonage weighs 192 pounds (87 kilograms). Multiple sources show his date of birth as 30 April 1985 or 30 May 1985.

== Water polo ==
Parsonage begun to play water polo at the age of fifteen after he joined the Warley Wasps in Warley, West Midlands. His career highlight was when he finished as the England National Water Polo League top scorer in 2009 with a team from Lancaster, Lancashire. He currently plays for the Lancaster water polo club and the UZSC Utrecht, a water polo club in Utrecht, the Netherlands. He played his first senior international match in Switzerland against Egypt in 2004.

=== Domestic championships ===
Parsonage has played in one domestic championship, the British Water Polo Championships of 2009. There were held in 2009, where he finished in gold medal position.

=== International championships ===
In 2007, he finished in sixth position at the LEN European B Nations, a continent club competition held in Manchester. However, he won the LEN European B Nations Trophy for the "Most Valuable Goalkeeper." In 2008, he played at the LEN European A Qualifiers in Dubrovnik, Croatia, and finished in fourth position. In 2008, along with his team, he played at the LEN European A Qualifiers in Dubrovnik, Croatia, and finished in fourth position. He later participated in the LEN European B Championships for water polo in 2009, which were held in Lugano, Switzerland. In this event, Parsonage finished in fourth position.

Parsonage has participated in three international championships. Along with his team, in 2007, he finished in twelfth position at the World University Game in the water polo event in Bangkok, Thailand. At the Comen Cup in the water polo event in 2008, he also finished in fourth position. The 2008 Comen Cup was held in Malta. At the Mithat Hantel Memorial Water Polo Tournament there was a victory in 2008. He finished in gold medal position in Istanbul, Turkey. At the 2012 Summer Olympics in London, he participated in the water polo event for Great Britain men's national water polo team.

=== School championships ===
Parsonage played in the water polo event at the World University Games held in Bangkok, Thailand, where he finished in twelfth position in 2009.
