= Great Britain Water Polo Juniors =

The Great Britain Water Polo junior teams are the national teams that represent Great Britain at youth level in the sport of Water Polo. There are male and female national junior teams, which compete internationally at the U-17 and U-20 level.

On March 15, 2015, the Great Britain U-17 women's water polo team qualified to compete in the 2015 European Games, after succeeding in the qualifying tournament held in Nice, France. The Great Britain U-17 men's water polo team failed to qualify, losing out by one goal to Malta.

== Results ==
=== Baku 2015 European Games Qualifying Tournament Results ===
Opposing Team	1st quarter	2nd quarter	3rd quarter	Final score	Result
Portugal	7-1	14-2	18-2	26-3	Win
Czech Republic	3-4	4-4	8-6	8-8	Draw
France	2-2	6-4	8-7	13-12	Loss
Switzerland	5-0	9-0	20-0	30-0	Win

The Great Britain U-17 Women's Team Qualified for the 2015 European Games.

=== Baku 2015 European Games Results ===
In the 2015 European Games, the GB U-17 women's team came 11th, beating Israel twice and narrowly losing to Germany.

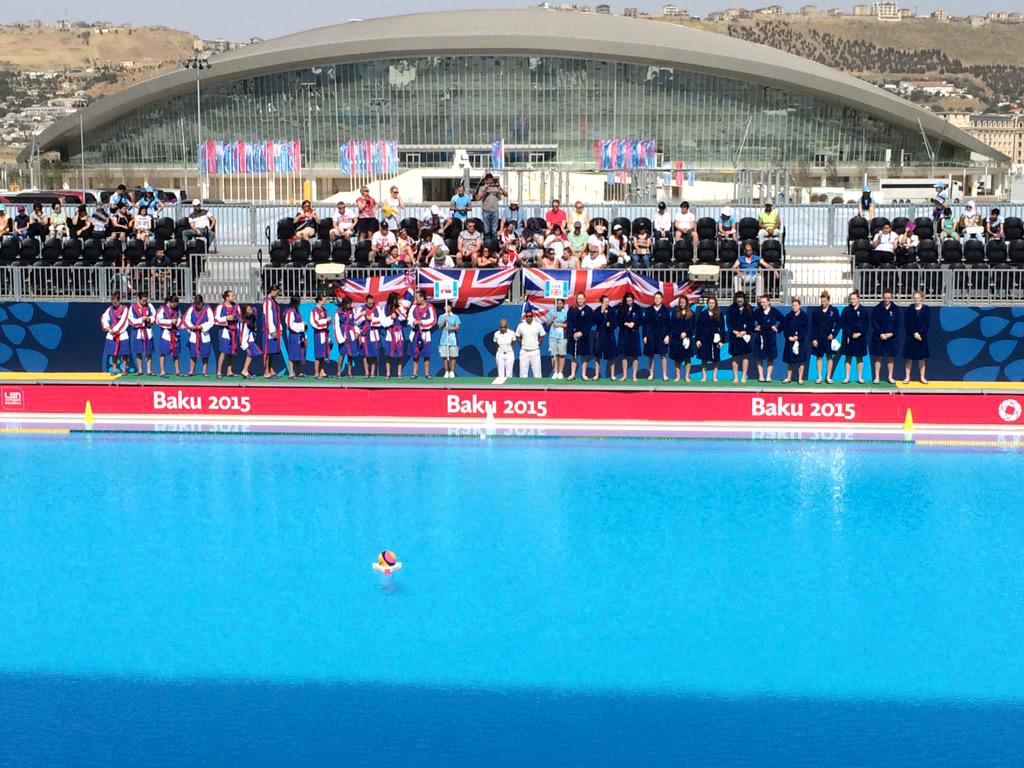
Great Britain v Serbia. Water Polo at the 2015 European Games

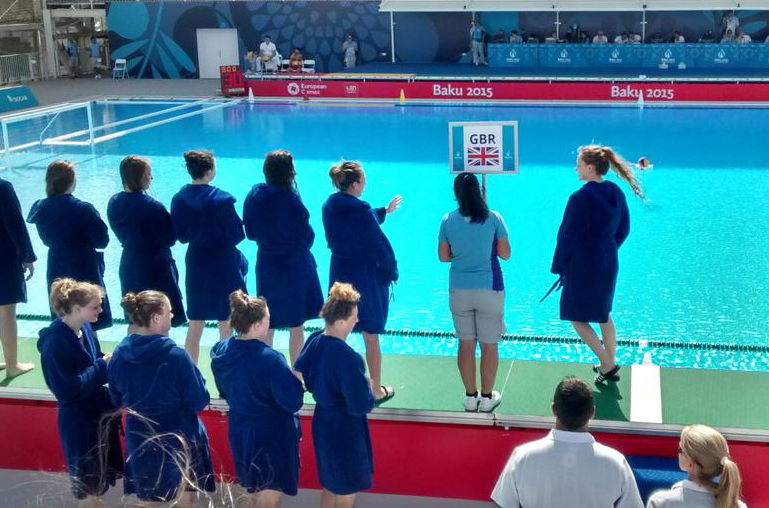
Great Britain U17 Water Polo Captain Izzy Dean leads the team out during the 2015 European Games

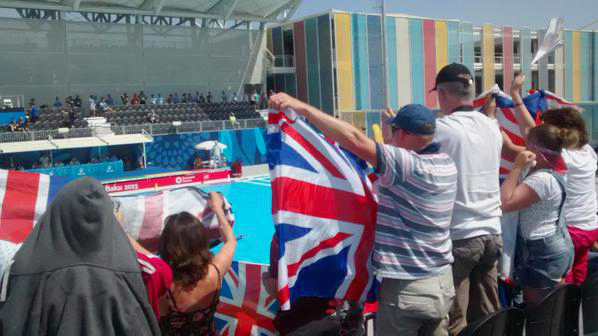
Great Britain U17 Women's Water Polo Fans at European Games 2015

== Roster ==
The following is the Great Britain U-17 women's water polo roster of the 2015 European Games.

Hat Number	Name	Position	Height	Handedness	Club
1	Hayley Price	Goalkeeper	165 cm; 5 ft 5 in	R	Tyldesley Swimming and Water Polo Club
2	Lucy Shaw	Driver	175 cm; 5 ft 9 in	R	Liverpool Water Polo Club
3	Bethany Ward	Driver	169 cm; 5 ft 7 in	R	Devonport Royal Swimming Association
4	Lara Partridge	Centre-back	165 cm; 5 ft 5 in	R	Mid Sussex Marlins
5	Grace Rowland	Driver	161 cm; 5 ft 3 in	R	Liverpool Water Polo Club
6	Fleur Kennedy	Centre-forward	178 cm; 5 ft 10 in	R	Warley Wasps
7	Hannah Edwards	Driver	167 cm; 5 ft 6 in	L	Menziehill Whitehall Swimming and Water Polo Club
8	Mhairi Nurthen	Driver	160 cm; 5 ft 3 in	R	London Otter Swimming and Water Polo Club
9	Izzy Dean (Captain)	Driver	170 cm; 5 ft 7 in	R	London Otter Swimming and Water Polo Club
10	Kathy Rodgers	Centre-back	168 cm; 5 ft 6 in	R	London Otter Swimming and Water Polo Club
11	Verity McCoy (Vice-captain)	Centre-back	175 cm; 5 ft 9 in	R	City of Liverpool
12	Dani Brazier	Centre-forward	178 cm; 5 ft 10 in	R	Chelmsford Swimming Club
13	Sophie Jackson	Goalkeeper	176 cm; 5 ft 9 in	R	Leeds Water Polo Club

- Head Coach: Nick Buller.
- Assistant Coach: Ant McGuinness.
- Team Manager: Sue Webb.
- Team Doctor: Adrian Lim.
- Team Physio: Victoria O'Donnell.

=== Video Highlights ===
Long-range goal by Lucy Shaw against Israel

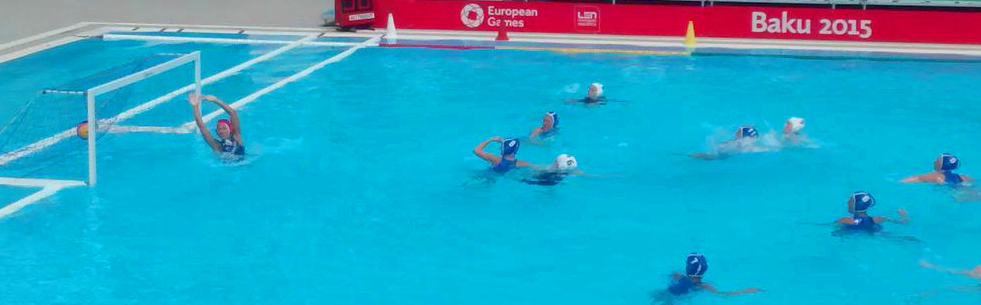
Great Britain's Hannah Edwards scores a cross-cage goal against Israel during the 2015 European Games

== GB U-17 Men's Team ==
=== Results ===
==== 2015 European Games Qualifying Tournament Results ====
Opposing Team	1st quarter	2nd quarter	3rd quarter	Final score	Result
Germany				7-19	Loss
Latvia	16-0	30-0	41-0	53-0	Win
Switzerland	2-0	3-0	7-1	12-1	Win
Malta	3-2	4-5	5-7	6-7	Loss

The Great Britain U-17 Men's Team did not qualify for the 2015 European Games. It is noted that this was the Great Britain U-17 men's team's first international competition as a team.
