= Sean King (water polo) =

British water polo player

Personal information
- Born: 3 May 1989 (age 36) Farnborough, Great Britain

Sport
- Sport: Water polo

Sean King (born 3 May 1989) is a British water polo player. At the 2012 Summer Olympics, he competed for Great Britain's men's national water polo team in the men's event. He is currently the head of aquatics at Trinity School, Croydon and the water polo coach. He is also a trainer with the Swim England national academy. He has led the school water polo teams to a number of national titles. He is 6 feet 4 inches (193 cm) tall.

== See also ==
- Great Britain men's Olympic water polo team records and statistics
