= Maurizio Felugo =

Italian water polo player

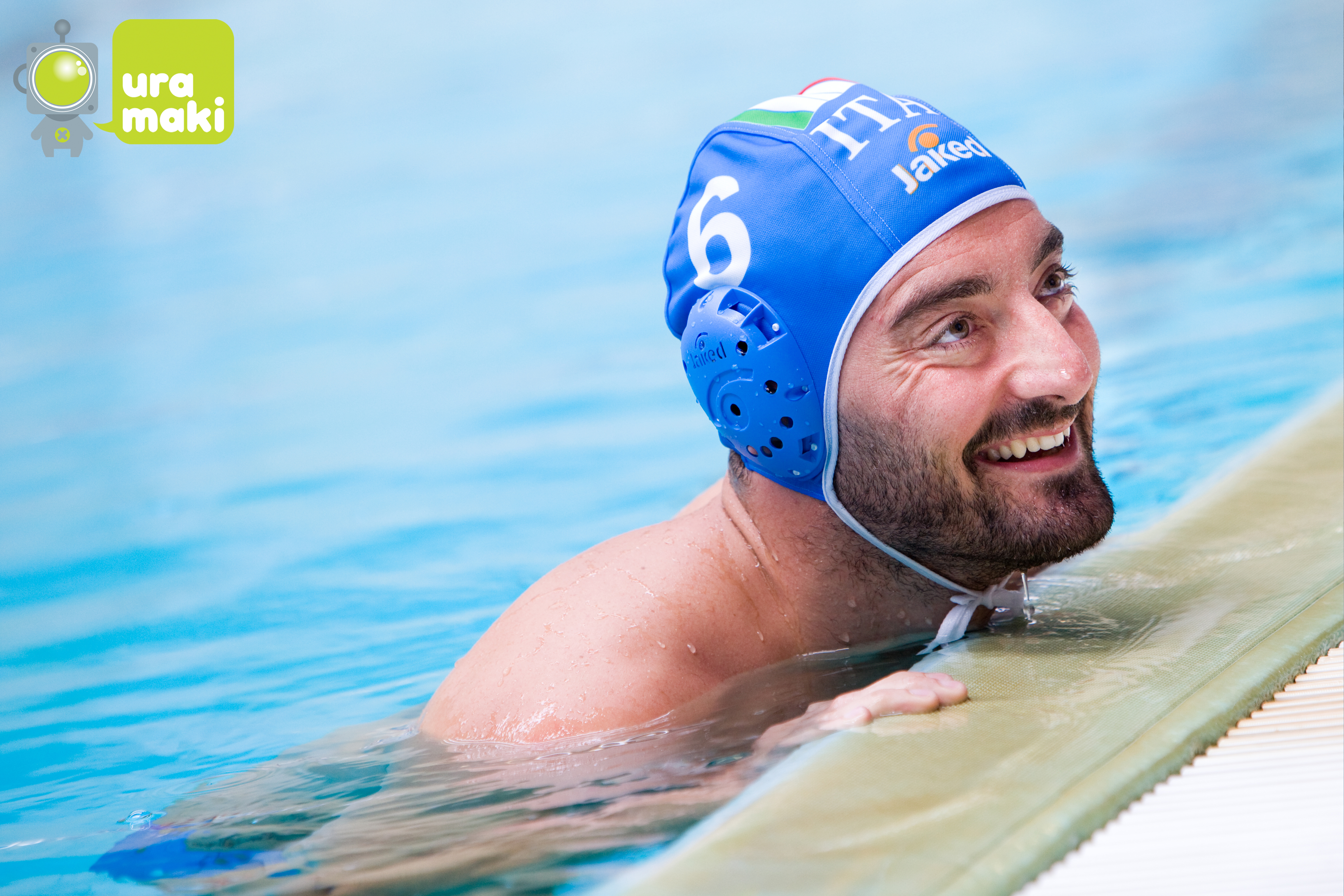

Personal information
- Born: 4 March 1981 (age 45) Rapallo, Italy

Sport
- Sport: Water polo
Medal record
Representing Italy
Olympic Games
Silver medal – second place	2012 London	Team competition
World Championships
Gold medal – first place	2011 Shanghai	Team competition
Silver medal – second place	2003 Barcelona	Team competition
World League
Silver medal – second place	2003 New York	Team competition
Silver medal – second place	2011 Florence	Team competition
European Championships
Silver medal – second place	2010 Zagreb	Team competition

Maurizio Felugo (born 4 March 1981) is an Italian male water polo player. He was a member of the Italy men's national water polo team, playing as a driver.

== Biography ==
Born at Rapallo, he currently plays for Pro Recco and the Italian water polo national team as a defender. Felugo debuted in the youth team of Chiavari Nuoto, and in 1998 he was acquired by Rari Nantes Savona. During his stay there, he received his first cap with the Italian national team. Moving to Posillipo after five years, he won there the Italian top division title and a LEN Euroleague. He is 1.89m and weighs 82 kg.

In 2006 he moved to Pro Recco. He won the gold medal at the 2011 FINA World Aquatics Championships in Shanghai.

He was part of the Italian team that won the silver medal at the 2012 Summer Olympics.

== See also ==
- Italy men's Olympic water polo team records and statistics
- List of Olympic medalists in water polo (men)
- List of men's Olympic water polo tournament top goalscorers
- List of world champions in men's water polo
- List of World Aquatics Championships medalists in water polo
