= Sean Ryder =

British water polo player (born 1987)

Personal information
- Born: 18 June 1987 (age 38) Nottingham, England

Sport
- Sport: Water polo

Sean Ryder (born 18 June 1987) is an English water polo player.

Born in Nottingham, Ryder has been playing water polo since he was 14. He has competed for Rapid Bucharest, SV Weiden and the Great Britain National Team. In 2012 he was selected to represent Great Britain in the 2012 London Olympics, the first British Olympic water polo team since 1956.
