= Joseph O'Regan =

British water polo player

Joe O'Regan
Personal information
- Full name: Joseph O'Regan
- Nationality: United Kingdom
- Born: 22 June 1991 (age 35)
- Height: 203 cm (80 in)
- Weight: 105 kg (231 lb)

Sport
- Sport: Water polo

Joseph "Joe" O'Regan (born 22 June 1991) is a British water polo player. At the 2012 Summer Olympics, he competed for the Great Britain men's national water polo team in the men's event. He is 6 ft 8 inches tall.

== Career ==
O'Regan took up water polo after an invitation from a local coach who spotted him swimming in Royton. After playing in local leagues, he joined Manchester Water Polo Club and made his international debut aged 18.

After being selected for Team GB's 2012 Olympic squad, O'Regan was assigned to play for Hungarian club Pecs. He also represented Britain in the 2011 FINA Men's Water Polo World League.

He continued to play after the Olympics, turning out for Manchester in the British championships. He helped England to a gold medal win in the 2014 Commonwealth Water Polo Championships, scoring a hattrick in the final against Malta.

== Personal life ==
Outside of water polo, O'Regan works as a primary school teacher.
