= Aleksa Šaponjić =

Serbian water polo player

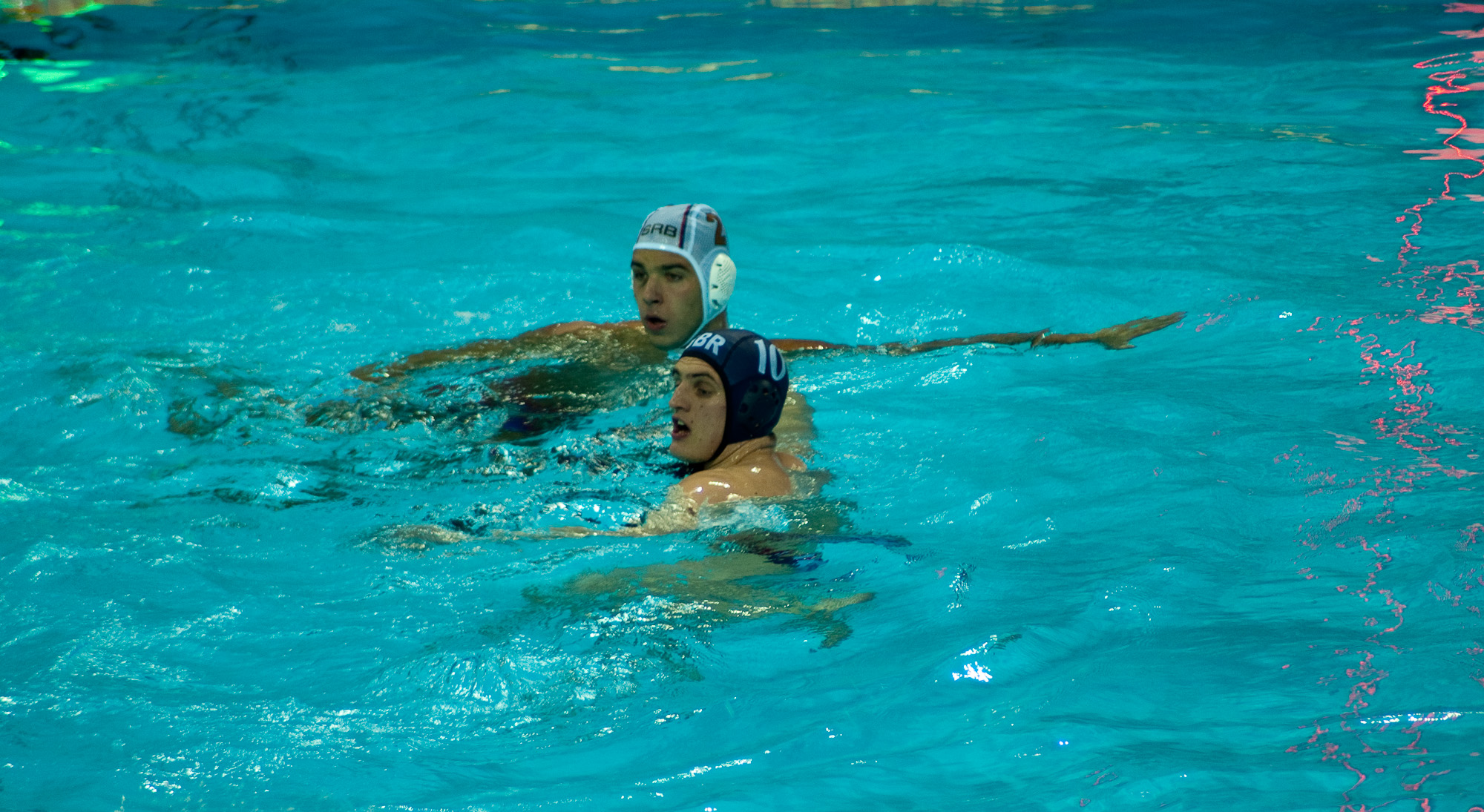
- Adam Scholefield and Aleksa Šaponjić

Personal information
- Born: 4 June 1992 (age 34) Belgrade, Serbia
Medal record
Men's water polo
Representing Serbia
Olympic Games
Bronze medal – third place	2012 London
European Championship
Gold medal – first place	2012 Eindhoven
FINA World League
Gold medal – first place	2013 Chelyabinsk
Universiade
Gold medal – first place	2011 Shenzhen	Team

Aleksa Šaponjić (Serbian Cyrillic: Алекса Шапоњић, born 4 June 1992) is a Serbian water polo player, and a member of the Serbia men's national water polo team. His first notable competition with his national team was the 2012 European Championship in Eindhoven, the outcome was a win. He currently attends the University of California, Berkeley and plays for the CA Golden Bears water polo team.

== Club career ==
- 2011–____ CA Golden Bears

== National career ==
=== 2012 Eindhoven ===
On 21 January in the fourth match of the European Championship, Šaponjić scored his first goal ever for his national team in professional competition match. It was in a routine victory against Romania 14–5. On 27 January Šaponjić scored a goal in a semifinal 12–8 victory over Italy. On 29 January, Šaponjić won the European Championship with his national team beating in the final Montenegro by 9–8. This was his first medal with the national team.

Šaponjić was a member of the bronze medal winning Serbian team in water polo at the 2012 Summer Olympics.

== See also ==
- Serbia men's Olympic water polo team records and statistics
- List of Olympic medalists in water polo (men)
