= Valentino Gallo =

Italian water polo player (born 1985)

Personal information
- Nationality: Italian
- Born: 17 July 1985 (age 40) Syracuse, Italy
- Height: 1.97 m (6 ft 6 in)
- Weight: 95 kg (209 lb)

Sport
- Country: Italy
- Sport: Water polo
Medal record
Olympic Games
Silver medal – second place	2012 London	Team
Bronze medal – third place	2016 Rio de Janeiro	Team
World Championships
Gold medal – first place	2011 Shanghai	Team
European Championships
Bronze medal – third place	2014 Budapest

Valentino Gallo (born 17 July 1985) is an Italian water polo player who competed in the 2008 Summer Olympics and 2012 Summer Olympics. He was part of the silver medal-winning team at the 2012 Summer Olympics. He is currently playing with AN Brescia in Italy.

== See also ==
- Italy men's Olympic water polo team records and statistics
- List of Olympic medalists in water polo (men)
- List of men's Olympic water polo tournament top goalscorers
- List of world champions in men's water polo
- List of World Aquatics Championships medalists in water polo
