= Ciaran James =

British water polo player (born 1991)

Personal information
- Born: 5 July 1991 (age 33); Bristol, Great Britain

Sport
- Sport: Water polo

Ciaran James (born 5 July 1991) is a British water polo player. At the 2012 Summer Olympics, he competed for the Great Britain men's national water polo team in the men's event. He is 6 ft 4 inches tall. Ciaran was born in Bristol but lives and plays for Lancaster when in the UK. Ciaran has played abroad for German club SV Cannstatt.

Since the Olympics, Ciaran has played for Catalunya in Spain (2012–13) and Sete in France (2013–14). He now plays for Dinamo Bucharest in Romania. In 2014, Ciaran was part of the gold medal-winning English team at the Commonwealth Water Polo tournament in Aberdeen and won the Most Valuable Player award.
