= Rhys Howden =

Australian water polo player

Personal information
- Born: 2 April 1987 (age 38); Brisbane, Australia

Sport
- Sport: Water polo

Rhys Howden (born 2 April 1987) is an Australian water polo player who competed in the 2008, 2012, 2016 & 2020 Summer Olympics. He was the joint top sprinter at the 2012 Olympics, with 19 sprints won. He was also the top sprinter at the 2016 Olympics, with 18 sprints won.

Howden was picked in the water polo Sharks squad to compete in the men's water polo tournament at the 2020 Summer Olympics. The team finished joint fourth on points in their pool but their inferior goal average meant they finished fifth overall and out of medal contention. They were able to upset Croatia in a group stage match 11–8.

== See also ==
- Australia men's Olympic water polo team records and statistics
