= Glen Robinson (water polo) =

British water polo player (born 1989)

Personal information
- Born: 26 January 1989 (age 37) Kendal, Great Britain

Sport
- Sport: Water polo
Medal record
Representing England
Commonwealth Championships
Gold medal – first place	2014 Aberdeen	Team competition

Glen Robinson (born 26 January 1989) is a British water polo player. At the 2012 Summer Olympics, he competed for the Great Britain men's national water polo team in the men's event. He is 6-foot-2-inch (1.88 m) inches tall.

== Career ==
Robinson began his career with Kendal, originally swimming with future Olympic water polo player Chloe Wilcox. Robinson later moved to play for Lancaster where he was selected for England's junior squad, helping them to a Home Nations tournament win in 2006. Following this, he was invited to join the Great Britain junior squad and travelled to a tournament in Canada.

In 2008, he scored against Spain to take Britain into the European Junior Championships.

In 2010, he relocated to Romania where he played for CS Rapid București. He later represented German club SV Würzburg 05.

He was selected for Great Britain's 2012 Olympic squad. He described the experience as his "pinnacle achievement".

In 2014, he was part of England's gold medal winning squad for the 2014 edition of the Commonwealth Water Polo Championships.

In 2015, he was again playing for Lancaster Water Polo Club and was still there by 2018.

== Personal life ==
Robinson is a supporter of Liverpool.
