= Cristian Iordache =

Romanian water polo player and coach

Sport
- Sport: Water polo

Cristian Iordache is a Romanian water polo coach. He was the head coach of the Great Britain men's national water polo team at the 2012 Summer Olympics.
