= Danijel Premuš =

Croatian-Italian water polo player

Personal information
- Born: 15 April 1981 (age 45) Rijeka, Yugoslavia
- Height: 6 ft 1 in (185 cm)

Sport
- Sport: Water polo
Medal record
Representing Italy
Olympic Games
Silver medal – second place	2012 London	Team competition

Danijel Premuš (born 15 April 1981) is a former water polo player. Premuš is a Croat who has dual Croatian and Italian citizenship and used to play for Croatia, going as far as being part of the Croatia men's national water polo team at 2004 Summer Olympics in the men's event. At the 2012 Summer Olympics, he competed for the Italy men's national water polo team in the men's event, losing to Croatia in the finals 8–6. He is 6 ft 1 inches tall. After retirement from water polo he returned to School of medicine Rijeka and earned degree in medicine (MD).

== See also ==
- List of Olympic medalists in water polo (men)
- List of sportspeople who competed for more than one nation
