= Jake Vincent =

British water polo player (born 1989)

Personal information
- Born: 24 June 1989 (age 37) Solihull, Great Britain

Sport
- Sport: Water polo
Medal record
Representing England
Commonwealth Championships
Gold medal – first place	2014 Aberdeen	Team competition

Jake Vincent (born 24 June 1989) is a British water polo player. At the 2012 Summer Olympics, he competed for the Great Britain men's national water polo team in the men's event. He is 6 ft 5.5 inches tall.

== Career ==
He made his senior international debut in 2008, at the Presidents Cup. Before his Olympic squad call up, he was playing in Germany with SV Bayer Uerdingen 08 and was still there as of 2013. He was part of Great Britain's squad for the 2014 Euro Championship qualification campaign. He helped England to a gold medal in the 2014 Commonwealth Water Polo Championships.

In 2016, he was playing for Cheltenham. In 2018, he helped Solihull to the British League Division One title. He was called up to England's squad for a game against Scotland in 2018.
