= Matthew Holland (water polo) =

British water polo player

Personal information
- Born: 22 June 1989 (age 35); Carshalton, Great Britain
- Height: 6 ft 4 in (1.93 m)

Sport
- Sport: Water polo

Matthew Holland (born 22 June 1989) is a British water polo goalkeeper. At the 2012 Summer Olympics, he competed for the Great Britain men's national water polo team in the men's event. He is 6 ft 4 in (1.93 m) tall.

At club level, he played with Spanish team Navarra in División de Honor. He also played in Holland and France before competing for Sutton & Cheam.

== See also ==
- Great Britain men's Olympic water polo team records and statistics
- List of men's Olympic water polo tournament goalkeepers
