= Edward Scott (water polo) =

British water polo player (born 1988)

Personal information
- Born: 28 May 1988 (age 36); Leeds, Great Britain

Sport
- Sport: Water polo

Edward "Ed" Scott (born 28 May 1988) is a British water polo goalkeeper. At the 2012 Summer Olympics, he competed for the Great Britain men's national water polo team in the men's event. He is 6 ft 5 inches tall. He played in the Spanish División De Honor for CE Mediterrani.

Scott continued to play the game at the highest level, competing for City of Manchester.

== See also ==
- Great Britain men's Olympic water polo team records and statistics
- List of men's Olympic water polo tournament goalkeepers
