= Jack Waller (water polo) =

British water polo player (born 1989)

Personal information
- Born: 6 October 1989 (age 35); Welwyn Garden City, Great Britain

Sport
- Sport: Water polo

Jack David Waller (born 6 October 1989) is a British water polo player who plays as a centre forward. At the 2012 Summer Olympics, he competed for the Great Britain men's national water polo team in the men's event. He is 6 ft 1.5 inches tall.

== Career ==
Waller began playing water polo at the age of 11, initially with Invictia in Kent, winning the Junior National Championship before helping the team into Division One of the National League. Following this, he relocated to Manchester to join Great Britain's elite water polo set up. He later played in Australia with Brisbane Barracudas, Germany with SV Wieden and Spain with Sant Andreu.

A member of Great Britain's national team since 2007, Waller was included in the country's 2012 Olympic squad. He scored in the team's first game, a 13–4 defeat to Romania.

In 2015, he was playing for Bexley.

In 2016, he was top scorer in the Kent Men's League, scoring 42 goals in a season for Beckenham.
