= Craig Figes =

British water polo player from Bristol

Personal information
- Born: 1978 (age 47–48) Bristol, Great Britain

Sport
- Sport: Water polo

Craig Figes (born 1978) is a British water polo player from Bristol. Figes went to Sir Bernard Lovell School in Oldland Common at the same time as Marcus Trescothick. At the 2012 Summer Olympics, he competed for the Great Britain men's national water polo team in the men's event. Figes is a former geography teacher at Manchester Grammar School. He also formally taught geography at Sidcot School in North Somerset before returning to water polo as a coach in the Great Britain Water Polo high performance Programme!
