= Billy Miller (water polo) =

Australian water polo player (born 1988)

Personal information
- Born: 21 February 1988 (age 38) Brisbane, Australia

Sport
- Sport: Water polo

Billy Miller (born 21 February 1988) is an Australian water polo player. At the 2012 Summer Olympics, he competed for the Australia men's national water polo team in the men's event. He is 188 cm (6 ft 2 in) tall and plays for the North Brisbane Polo Bears and the Queensland Breakers.

His brother was Cole Miller, who was also a water polo player for Brisbane Barracudas, before being killed in a king hit attack on Brisbane Chinatown Mall on January 4, 2016.
