= Robert Parker (water polo) =

British water polo player

Personal information
- Born: 4 December 1987 (age 37); Cheltenham, Great Britain

Sport
- Sport: Water polo

Robert Parker (born 4 December 1987) is a British water polo player. At the 2012 Summer Olympics, he competed for the Great Britain men's national water polo team in the men's event. He is 6 ft 6 inches tall. He was the top goal scorer for Team GB with 8 goals in the London Olympics.
