= South Africa at the 2023 World Aquatics Championships =

- Flag of South Africa
- FINA code: RSA
- National federation: Swimming South Africa
- Website: swimsa.org

in Fukuoka, Japan
- Competitors: 51 in 5 sports
- Medals Ranked 17th: Gold 1 Silver 1 Bronze 0 Total 2

World Aquatics Championships appearances
- 1973; 1975; 1978; 1982; 1986; 1991; 1994; 1998; 2001; 2003; 2005; 2007; 2009; 2011; 2013; 2015; 2017; 2019; 2022; 2023; 2024

South Africa competed at the 2023 World Aquatics Championships in Fukuoka, Japan from 14 to 30 July.

== Medalists ==
Medal	Name	Sport	Event	Date
Gold	Tatjana Schoenmaker	Swimming	Women's 200 m breaststroke	July 28
Silver	Tatjana Schoenmaker	Swimming	Women's 100 m breaststroke	July 25

== Athletes by discipline ==
The following is the list of number of competitors participating at the Championships per discipline.

Sport	Men	Women	Total
Artistic swimming	0	3	3
Diving	1	3	4
Open water swimming	3	3	6
Swimming	4	7	11
Water polo	14	13	27
Total	22	29	51

== Artistic swimming ==
South Africa entered 3 artistic swimmers.

Women

Athlete	Event	Preliminaries		Final	
Athlete	Event	Points	Rank	Points	Rank
Skye MacDonald	Solo technical routine	158.9600	26	Did not advance	
Skye MacDonald	Solo free routine	122.4375	22	Did not advance	
Jess Hayes-Hill Laura Strugnell	Duet technical routine	126.7933	38	Did not advance	
Jess Hayes-Hill Laura Strugnell	Duet free routine	121.1624	28	Did not advance	

== Diving ==
South Africa entered 4 divers.

Men

Athlete	Event	Preliminaries		Semifinal		Final	
Athlete	Event	Points	Rank	Points	Rank	Points	Rank
Stefan Steenkamp	1 m springboard	219.30	61	—		Did not advance	

Women

Athlete	Event	Preliminaries		Semifinal		Final	
Athlete	Event	Points	Rank	Points	Rank	Points	Rank
Bailey Heydra	1 m springboard	202.00	36	—		Did not advance	
Bailey Heydra	3 m springboard	188.40	49	Did not advance			
Julia Vincent	1 m springboard	242.25	6 Q	—		227.05	11
Julia Vincent	3 m springboard	277.70	14 Q	295.95	11 Q	297.30	10
Bailey Heydra; Zalika Methula	3 m synchro springboard	220.14	17	—		Did not advance	

== Open water swimming ==
South Africa entered 6 open water swimmers.

Men

Athlete	Event	Time	Rank
Joshua Ashley	Men's 10 km	2:04:53.6	52
Connor Buck	Men's 5 km	56:52.4	23
Connor Buck	Men's 10 km	2:01:34.7	43
Matthew Caldwell	Men's 5 km	DNF	

Women

Athlete	Event	Time	Rank
Kate Beavon	Women's 5 km	1:02:46.5	42
Amica de Jager	Women's 5 km	1:01:28.9	24
Amica de Jager	Women's 10 km	2:10:31.9	40
Tory Earle	Women's 10 km	2:19:27.7	51

Mixed

Athlete	Event	Time	Rank
Amica de Jager; Kate Beavon; Matthew Caldwell; Connor Buck	Team relay	1:16:12.1	14

== Swimming ==
South Africa entered 11 swimmers. Chad Le Clos was originally named in the team, however withdrew due to illness.

Men

Athlete	Event	Heat		Semifinal		Final	
Athlete	Event	Time	Rank	Time	Rank	Time	Rank
Michael Houlie	50 m breaststroke	27.31	14 Q	27.57	16	Did not advance	
Michael Houlie	100 m breaststroke	1:01.58	30	Did not advance			
Clayton Jimmie	100 m freestyle	49.95	43	Did not advance			
Clayton Jimmie	50 m backstroke	25.97	37	Did not advance			
Righardt Muller	200 m freestyle	1:52.25	44	Did not advance			
Righardt Muller	800 m freestyle	8:07.08	31	—		Did not advance	
Righardt Muller	1500 m freestyle	15:33.82	23	—		Did not advance	
Roland Schoeman	50 m freestyle	22.87	50	Did not advance			
Roland Schoeman	50 m butterfly	24.02	44	Did not advance			

Women

Athlete	Event	Heat		Semifinal		Final	
Athlete	Event	Time	Rank	Time	Rank	Time	Rank
Aimee Canny	100 m freestyle	54.60	14 Q	54.87	16	Did not advance	
Aimee Canny	200 m freestyle	1:59.30	24	Did not advance			
Emma Chelius	50 m freestyle	25.34	23	Did not advance			
Milla Drakopoulos	50 m backstroke	29.31	37	Did not advance			
Milla Drakopoulos	100 m backstroke	1:02.77	35	Did not advance			
Trinity Hearne	100 m butterfly	1:00.27	29	Did not advance			
Trinity Hearne	200 m butterfly	2:14.78	26	Did not advance			
Rebecca Meder	200 m individual medley	2:10.95 NR	11 Q	2:11.16	10	Did not advance	
Rebecca Meder	400 m individual medley	4:45.68	21	—		Did not advance	
Tatjana Schoenmaker	50 m breaststroke	30.70	14	Withdraw			
Tatjana Schoenmaker	100 m breaststroke	1:05.56	3 Q	1:05.53	3 Q	1:05.84	2nd place, silver medalist(s)
Tatjana Schoenmaker	200 m breaststroke	2:22.92	2 Q	2:21.31	1 Q	2:20.80	1st place, gold medalist(s)
Lara van Niekerk	50 m breaststroke	30.76	17 Q	29.91	3 Q	30.09	4
Lara van Niekerk	100 m breaststroke	1:07.03	18	Did not advance			
Aimee Canny; Emma Chelius; Milla Drakopoulos; Trinity Hearne	4 × 100 m freestyle relay	3:45.54	17	—		Did not advance	

Mixed

Athlete	Event	Heat		Final	
Athlete	Event	Time	Rank	Time	Rank
Clayton Jimmie; Aimee Canny; Roland Schoeman; Rebecca Meder	4 × 100 m freestyle relay	3:30.16 AF	18	Did not advance	

== Water polo ==
Summary

Team	Event	Group stage				Playoff	Quarterfinal	Semifinal	Final / BM	
Team	Event	Opposition Score	Opposition Score	Opposition Score	Rank	Opposition Score	Opposition Score	Opposition Score	Opposition Score	Rank
South Africa	Men's tournament	Montenegro; L 10–35	Serbia; L 5–30	Spain; L 6–27	4	—	—	Argentina; L 6–15	China; L 8–16	16
South Africa	Women's tournament	Greece; L 2–24	Italy; L 2–24	Argentina; W 12–9	3 QP	Canada; L 6–21	—	France; L 6–20	New Zealand; L 6–25	12

=== Men's tournament ===
Team roster

The following is the South African roster.

Head coach: Vaughn Marlow

- 1 Lwazi Madi GK
- 2 Chad Roman FP
- 3 Niall Wheeler FP
- 4 Ignardus Badenhorst FP
- 5 Cameron Laurenson FP
- 6 Ross Stone FP
- 7 Dane Tucker FP
- 8 Manqoba Bungane FP
- 9 Dylan Cronje FP
- 10 Joshua Faber FP
- 11 Todd Howard FP
- 12 Jonathan Swanepoel FP
- 13 Gareth May GK
- Sven van Zyl FP

Group play

Pos	Team	Pld	W	PSW	PSL	L	GF	GA	GD	Pts	Qualification
1	Spain	3	3	0	0	0	54	27	+27	9	Quarterfinals
2	Serbia	3	1	1	0	1	57	34	+23	5	Playoffs
3	Montenegro	3	1	0	1	1	55	34	+21	4	Playoffs
4	South Africa	3	0	0	0	3	21	92	−71	0	

Source: Sportresult
Rules for classification: 1) points; 2) head-to-head points; 3) head-to-head goal difference; 4) head-to-head number of goals scored; 5) Goal difference.

17 July 2023; 17:30	Report	Montenegro	35–10	South Africa	Marine Messe Fukuoka, Fukuoka; Referees: Sebastien Dervieux (FRA), Georgios Stavridis (GRE)
17 July 2023; 17:30	Report	Score by quarters: 6–1, 10–0, 9–5, 10–4			Marine Messe Fukuoka, Fukuoka; Referees: Sebastien Dervieux (FRA), Georgios Stavridis (GRE)
17 July 2023; 17:30	Report	Radović 7	Goals	four players 2	Marine Messe Fukuoka, Fukuoka; Referees: Sebastien Dervieux (FRA), Georgios Stavridis (GRE)

19 July 2023; 16:00	Report	South Africa	5–30	Serbia	Marine Messe Fukuoka, Fukuoka; Referees: David Couper (NZL), Chisato Kurosaki (JPN)
19 July 2023; 16:00	Report	Score by quarters: 1–8, 1–9, 1–7, 2–6			Marine Messe Fukuoka, Fukuoka; Referees: David Couper (NZL), Chisato Kurosaki (JPN)
19 July 2023; 16:00	Report	Laurenson 2	Goals	Jakšić, Rašović 6	Marine Messe Fukuoka, Fukuoka; Referees: David Couper (NZL), Chisato Kurosaki (JPN)

21 July 2023; 10:30	Report	South Africa	6–27	Spain	Marine Messe Fukuoka, Fukuoka; Referees: Sebastien Dervieux (FRA), Natalia Markopoulou (GRE)
21 July 2023; 10:30	Report	Score by quarters: 2–8, 2–7, 2–8, 0–4			Marine Messe Fukuoka, Fukuoka; Referees: Sebastien Dervieux (FRA), Natalia Markopoulou (GRE)
21 July 2023; 10:30	Report	Badenhorst 2	Goals	Valera 5	Marine Messe Fukuoka, Fukuoka; Referees: Sebastien Dervieux (FRA), Natalia Markopoulou (GRE)

13–16th place semifinals

23 July 2023; 10:30	Report	Argentina	15–6	South Africa	Marine Messe Fukuoka, Fukuoka; Referees: Nóra Debreceni (HUN), David Couper (NZL)
23 July 2023; 10:30	Report	Score by quarters: 3–0, 4–2, 5–1, 3–3			Marine Messe Fukuoka, Fukuoka; Referees: Nóra Debreceni (HUN), David Couper (NZL)
23 July 2023; 10:30	Report	Camnasio 4	Goals	Wheeler 2	Marine Messe Fukuoka, Fukuoka; Referees: Nóra Debreceni (HUN), David Couper (NZL)

15th place game

25 July 2023; 09:00	Report	China	16–8	South Africa	Marine Messe Fukuoka, Fukuoka; Referees: Germán Moller (ARG), Hélène Painchaud (CAN)
25 July 2023; 09:00	Report	Score by quarters: 3–2, 4–2, 4–1, 5–3			Marine Messe Fukuoka, Fukuoka; Referees: Germán Moller (ARG), Hélène Painchaud (CAN)
25 July 2023; 09:00	Report	Chen Z. 7	Goals	Badenhorst, Howard 2	Marine Messe Fukuoka, Fukuoka; Referees: Germán Moller (ARG), Hélène Painchaud (CAN)

=== Women's tournament ===
Team roster

The following is the South African roster.

Head coach: Nicola Barrett

- 1 Meghan Maartens GK
- 2 Tumi Macdonell FP
- 3 Annie Thornton-Dibb FP
- 4 Boati Motau FP
- 5 Megan Sileno FP
- 6 Hanna Muller FP
- 7 Shakira January FP
- 8 Esihle Zondo FP
- 9 Ruby Versfeld FP
- 10 Nicola Macleod FP
- 11 Chloe Meecham FP
- 12 Kelsey White FP
- 13 Olufunke Gando GK

Group play

Pos	Team	Pld	W	PSW	PSL	L	GF	GA	GD	Pts	Qualification
1	Greece	3	3	0	0	0	61	16	+45	9	Quarterfinals
2	Italy	3	2	0	0	1	63	19	+44	6	Playoffs
3	South Africa	3	1	0	0	2	16	57	−41	3	Playoffs
4	Argentina	3	0	0	0	3	12	60	−48	0	

Source: Sportresult
Rules for classification: 1) points; 2) head-to-head points; 3) head-to-head goal difference; 4) head-to-head number of goals scored; 5) Goal difference.

16 July 2023; 17:30	Report	Greece	24–2	South Africa	Marine Messe Fukuoka, Fukuoka; Referees: Nicola Johnson (AUS), Darren Spiritsanto (USA)
16 July 2023; 17:30	Report	Score by quarters: 7–1, 6–1, 6–0, 5–0			Marine Messe Fukuoka, Fukuoka; Referees: Nicola Johnson (AUS), Darren Spiritsanto (USA)
16 July 2023; 17:30	Report	Fountotou, E. Plevritou 4	Goals	Sileno, Zondo 1	Marine Messe Fukuoka, Fukuoka; Referees: Nicola Johnson (AUS), Darren Spiritsanto (USA)

18 July 2023; 12:00	Report	South Africa	2–24	Italy	Marine Messe Fukuoka, Fukuoka; Referees: Jennifer McCall (USA), Chisato Kurosaki (JPN)
18 July 2023; 12:00	Report	Score by quarters: 1–2, 0–7, 1–7, 0–8			Marine Messe Fukuoka, Fukuoka; Referees: Jennifer McCall (USA), Chisato Kurosaki (JPN)
18 July 2023; 12:00	Report	MacDonell, Meecham 1	Goals	Bettini, Giustini 4	Marine Messe Fukuoka, Fukuoka; Referees: Jennifer McCall (USA), Chisato Kurosaki (JPN)

20 July 2023; 09:00	Report	Argentina	9–12	South Africa	Marine Messe Fukuoka, Fukuoka; Referees: David Gómez (ESP), Jennifer McCall (USA),
20 July 2023; 09:00	Report	Score by quarters: 2–2, 3–5, 2–2, 2–3			Marine Messe Fukuoka, Fukuoka; Referees: David Gómez (ESP), Jennifer McCall (USA),
20 July 2023; 09:00	Report	Auliel 4	Goals	Meecham 3	Marine Messe Fukuoka, Fukuoka; Referees: David Gómez (ESP), Jennifer McCall (USA),

Playoffs

22 July 2023; 18:30	Report	South Africa	6–21	Canada	Marine Messe Fukuoka, Fukuoka; Referees: Nicola Johnson (AUS), David Couper (NZL)
22 July 2023; 18:30	Report	Score by quarters: 1–6, 1–4, 1–4, 3–7			Marine Messe Fukuoka, Fukuoka; Referees: Nicola Johnson (AUS), David Couper (NZL)
22 July 2023; 18:30	Report	Thornton-Dibb 2	Goals	Wright 4	Marine Messe Fukuoka, Fukuoka; Referees: Nicola Johnson (AUS), David Couper (NZL)

9–12th place semifinals

24 July 2023; 13:30	Report	France	20–6	South Africa	Marine Messe Fukuoka, Fukuoka; Referees: Hélène Painchaud (CAN), Germán Moller (ARG)
24 July 2023; 13:30	Report	Score by quarters: 4–1, 6–0, 5–4, 5–1			Marine Messe Fukuoka, Fukuoka; Referees: Hélène Painchaud (CAN), Germán Moller (ARG)
24 July 2023; 13:30	Report	Vernoux 6	Goals	Thornton-Dibb 3	Marine Messe Fukuoka, Fukuoka; Referees: Hélène Painchaud (CAN), Germán Moller (ARG)

Eleventh place game

26 July 2023; 09:00	Report	New Zealand	25–6	South Africa	Marine Messe Fukuoka, Fukuoka; Referees: Chisato Kurosaki (JPN), Adil Aimbetov (KAZ)
26 July 2023; 09:00	Report	Score by quarters: 7–0, 6–3, 6–1, 6–2			Marine Messe Fukuoka, Fukuoka; Referees: Chisato Kurosaki (JPN), Adil Aimbetov (KAZ)
26 July 2023; 09:00	Report	Houghton 7	Goals	Meecham, Versfeld 2	Marine Messe Fukuoka, Fukuoka; Referees: Chisato Kurosaki (JPN), Adil Aimbetov (KAZ)
