= 2023 Pan American Water Polo Championships =

- Venue: Bauru, Brazil
- Dates: 3–8 April 2023
- Website: www.panamaquatics.com

Medalists
gold medal	Men: Canada
gold medal	Women: Canada

The 2023 Pan American Water Polo Championships was the 10th edition of the continental championship, organized by the Swimming Union of the Americas. The competition was the 10th for men and 8th for women. This is the first tournament since being renamed as the 2023 Pan American Water Polo Championships. The event was held in Bauru, Brazil.

This tournament acted as the continental qualification for the Water Polo at the 2023 World Aquatics Championships, and men's and women's FINA Water Polo World Cup Division 2, with the top two from each gender qualifying for both tournaments. However, in regards to the FINA Water Polo World Cup Division 2, each team that qualified declined the invitation.

== Participating teams ==
=== Men's tournament ===
- Argentina
- Brazil (hosts)
- Canada

=== Women's tournament ===
- Argentina
- Brazil (hosts)
- Canada
- Peru

== Venue ==
The tournament was held in the Brazilian city of Bauru.

== Men's tournament ==
Men's tournament
Tournament details
- Venue: 1 (in 1 host city)
- Dates: 3–8 April 2023
- Teams: 3

Final positions
- Champions: Canada
- Runners-up: Brazil
- Third place: Argentina

Tournament statistics
- Matches played: 6

In the men's event, Canada won the trophy, by finishing first in the group. Canada and, originally, Brazil, qualified for the Water polo at the 2023 World Aquatics Championships – Men's tournament by finishing top two in the tournament. But after the championship ended, Brazil had to withdraw due to financial constraints and were replaced by Argentina.

=== Format ===
The three teams played each other twice, with the winners of the group being crowned champions.

=== Table ===
Pos	Team	Pld	W	PSW	PSL	L	GF	GA	GD	Pts	Final result	CAN	BRA	ARG
1	Canada (C)	4	2	0	1	1	47	45	+2	7	Gold	—	13–12	10–10 (3–4p)
2	Brazil (H)	4	2	0	0	2	48	46	+2	6	Silver	10–12	—	12–9
3	Argentina	4	1	1	0	2	44	48	−4	5	Bronze	13–12	12–14	—

Source: www.panamaquatics.com
(C) Champion; (H) Host

3 April 2023; 21:00	Canada	13–12	Brazil	Bauru, Brazil
3 April 2023; 21:00	Score by quarters: 3–1, 4–6, 3–3, 3–2			Bauru, Brazil

4 April 2023; 21:00	Argentina	13–12	Canada	Bauru, Brazil
4 April 2023; 21:00	Score by quarters: 3–4, 1–3, 4–1, 4–3			Bauru, Brazil

5 April 2023; 21:00	Brazil	12–9	Argentina	Bauru, Brazil
5 April 2023; 21:00	Score by quarters: 2–1, 4–2, 6–1, 2–5			Bauru, Brazil

6 April 2023; 21:00	Brazil	10–12	Canada	Bauru, Brazil
6 April 2023; 21:00	Score by quarters: 4–4, 0–2, 3–3, 3–3			Bauru, Brazil

7 April 2023; 20:30	Canada	10–10; PSO: 3–4	Argentina	Bauru, Brazil
7 April 2023; 20:30	Score by quarters: 1–4, 4–3, 4–2, 1–1			Bauru, Brazil

8 April 2023; 16:00	Argentina	12–14	Brazil	Brazil, Bauru
8 April 2023; 16:00	Score by quarters: 2–4, 3–4, 4–4, 3–2			Brazil, Bauru

=== Final standings ===
Rank	Team
1st place, gold medalist(s)	Canada
2nd place, silver medalist(s)	Brazil
3rd place, bronze medalist(s)	Argentina

Qualified for the Water polo at the 2023 World Aquatics Championships – Men's tournament

Note: Brazil withdrew from the World Championship

== Women's tournament ==
Women's tournament
Tournament details
- Venue: 1 (in 1 host city)
- Dates: 3–7 April 2023
- Teams: 4

Final positions
- Champions: Canada
- Runners-up: Brazil
- Third place: Argentina
- Fourth place: Peru

Tournament statistics
- Matches played: 10

In the women's event, Canada won the trophy, beating Brazil in the final. Canada and, originally, Brazil, qualified for the Water polo at the 2023 World Aquatics Championships – Women's tournament by finishing top two in the tournament. But after the championship ended, Brazil had to withdraw due to financial constraints and were replaced by Argentina.

=== Format ===
The four teams played each other once, with first playing fourth and second playing third in the semifinals. The winners of the semifinals advanced to the final, while the losers competed for bronze.

=== Table ===
Pos	Team	Pld	W	PSW	PSL	L	GF	GA	GD	Pts	CAN	BRA	ARG	PER
1	Canada	3	3	0	0	0	61	20	+41	9	—	16–12		
2	Brazil (H)	3	2	0	0	1	47	28	+19	6		—		26–4
3	Argentina	3	1	0	0	2	27	34	−7	3	6–19	8–9	—	
4	Peru	3	0	0	0	3	12	65	−53	0	2–26		6–13	—

Source: www.panamaquatics.com
(H) Host

3 April 2023; 16:00	Brazil	26–4	Peru	Bauru, Brazil
3 April 2023; 16:00	Score by quarters: 7–0, 10–0, 3–1, 7–3			Bauru, Brazil

3 April 2023; 17:15	Argentina	6–19	Canada	Bauru, Brazil
3 April 2023; 17:15	Score by quarters: 2–4, 1–7, 1–3, 2–5			Bauru, Brazil

4 April 2023; 16:00	Canada	16–12	Brazil	Bauru, Brazil
4 April 2023; 16:00	Score by quarters: 4–3, 6–2, 3–2, 3–5			Bauru, Brazil

4 April 2023; 17:15	Peru	6–13	Argentina	Bauru, Brazil
4 April 2023; 17:15	Score by quarters: 1–1, 2–5, 2–2, 1–5			Bauru, Brazil

5 April 2023; 16:00	Argentina	8–9	Brazil	Bauru, Brazil
5 April 2023; 16:00	Score by quarters: 2–3, 3–2, 1–2, 2–2			Bauru, Brazil

5 April 2023; 17:15	Peru	2–26	Canada	Bauru, Brazil
5 April 2023; 17:15	Score by quarters: 0–4, 0–7, 1–8, 1–7			Bauru, Brazil

=== Knockout stage ===
==== Bracket ====
Semifinals
7 April 2023
Canada	25
Peru	2
7 April 2023
Brazil	19
Argentina	11

Final
8 April 2023
Canada	16
Brazil	11
Third place game
8 April 2023
Peru	10
Argentina	14

==== Semifinals ====
6 April 2023; 13:00	Canada	25–2	Peru	Bauru, Brazil
6 April 2023; 13:00	Score by quarters: 8–0, 5–1, 6–1, 6–0			Bauru, Brazil

6 April 2023; 14:15	Brazil	19–11	Argentina	Bauru, Brazil
6 April 2023; 14:15	Score by quarters: 5–2, 3–1, 4–4, 7–4			Bauru, Brazil

==== Third place game ====
7 April 2023; 13:00	Peru	10–14	Argentina	Bauru, Brazil
7 April 2023; 13:00	Score by quarters: 2–3, 1–3, 4–5, 3–3			Bauru, Brazil

==== Final ====
7 April 2023; 14:15	Canada	16–11	Brazil	Bauru, Brazil
7 April 2023; 14:15	Score by quarters: 2–2, 3–1, 6–4, 5–4			Bauru, Brazil

=== Final standings ===
Rank	Team
1st place, gold medalist(s)	Canada
2nd place, silver medalist(s)	Brazil
3rd place, bronze medalist(s)	Argentina
4	Peru

Qualified for the Water polo at the 2023 World Aquatics Championships – Women's tournament

Note: Brazil withdrew from the World Championship

== See also ==
- Water polo at the 2023 World Aquatics Championships – Men's tournament
- Water polo at the 2023 World Aquatics Championships – Women's tournament
- 2022 Asian Water Polo Championship
- 2022 Men's European Water Polo Championship
- 2022 Women's European Water Polo Championship
