= Pan American Championship =

International sports competition

Countries usually participating in Pan American championships

A Pan American Championship is a top-level international sports competition between athletes or sports teams representing their respective countries or professional sports clubs in the Americas. Typically these championships are recurring, the most common formats being annual, biennial, and quadrennial. It should not be confused with the Pan American Games, which is the highest level sporting competition for the region. It is common for there to be sport-specific governing bodies to organise these regional competitions, such as the Pan American Judo Confederation.

== Major tournaments ==
Sport	Name	Continents/Nations	First edition
Archery	Pan American Archery Championships	Americas	1972
Artistic swimming	Pan American Artistic Swimming Championships	Americas	2010
Athletics	Pan American Race Walking Cup; Pan American Combined Events Cup; Pan American Cross Country Cup	Americas	1984; 2005; 2015
Badminton	Pan American Badminton Championships	Americas	1977
Baseball	Pan American Baseball Championship / Copa América	Americas	1985
Basketball	FIBA AmeriCup; FIBA Women's AmeriCup	Americas	1980
Beach handball	Pan American Beach Handball Championship	Americas	1998
Boxing	Pan American Boxing Championships	Americas	1990
Brazilian jiu-jitsu	Pan IBJJF Jiu-Jitsu Championship; Pan IBJJF Jiu-Jitsu No-Gi Championship	Americas	1996; 2007
Chess	Pan American Chess Championship	Americas	1945
Checkers	Pan American Draughts Championship	Americas	1980
Cricket	ICC Americas Championship	Americas	2000
Cycling	Pan American Cycling Championships; Pan American Mountain Bike Championships	Americas	1974; 1996
Fencing	Pan American Fencing Championships	Americas	2006
Field hockey	Men's Pan American Cup; Women's Pan American Cup	Americas	2000; 2001
Football (soccer)	Panamerican Championship	Americas	1952
Gymnastics	Pan American Gymnastics Championships	Americas	1997
Handball	Pan American Men's Handball Championship; Pan American Women's Handball Championship	Americas	1980; 1986
Ice hockey	Pan American Ice Hockey Tournament	Americas	2014
Indoor hockey	Men's Indoor Pan American Cup; Women's Indoor Pan American Cup	Americas	2002
Judo	Pan American Judo Championships	Americas	1952
Karate	Pan American Karate Championships	Americas	2019
Korfball	Pan-American Korfball Championship	Americas	2014
Racquetball	Pan American Racquetball Championships	Americas	1987
Rink hockey	Rink Hockey American Cup	Americas	2007
Rugby union	PARA Pan American Championship; Americas Rugby Championship (top 6 rugby union teams)	Americas	1995; 2009
Squash	Pan American Squash Championships	Americas	2002
Table tennis	Pan American Table Tennis Championships	Americas	2017
Taekwondo	Pan American Taekwondo Championships	Americas	1978
Tennis	Pan American Championships	Americas	1943–1969
Triathlon	Pan American Triathlon Championships	Americas	1991
Volleyball	Volleyball America's Cup; Women's Pan-American Volleyball Cup; Men's Pan-American Volleyball Cup	Americas	1998; 2002; 2006
Water polo	Pan American Water Polo Championships	Americas	2006
Weightlifting	Pan American Weightlifting Championships	Americas	1982
Wheelchair rugby	IWRF Americas Championship	Americas	2009
Wrestling	Pan American Wrestling Championships	Americas	1984
Wushu	Pan American Wushu Championships	Americas	1996

== See also ==
- Pan American Games, a multi-sport event between competitors from all nations in the Americas
- Championship
- World championship
  - African Championship
  - Asian Championship
  - Central American Championships (disambiguation)
  - European Championship
    - European Junior Championships (disambiguation)
  - North American Championship
    - Canadian Championships
  - Oceania Championship
  - South American Championship
