= Pan American Water Polo Championships =

International water polo competition

The Pan American Water Polo Championships, formerly the UANA Water Polo Cup (ASUA Water Polo Cup), is an international water polo tournament for national water polo teams from North and South America, organized by PanAm Aquatics (UANA or ASUA). It is the continental qualification for the World Aquatics Championships.

== Men's competition ==
| Year | Host | Champion | Runner-up | Third place | Fourth place | Qualification for | Ref |
|---|---|---|---|---|---|---|---|
| 2001 | La Romana, Dominican Republic | United States | Brazil | Canada | Cuba | 2001 World Aquatics Championships | |
| 2005 | Mexico City, Mexico | United States | Canada | Cuba | Brazil | 2005 World Aquatics Championships | |
| 2006 | Rio de Janeiro, Brazil | United States | Canada | Brazil | Colombia | 2007 World Aquatics Championships | |
| 2009 | Calgary, Canada | Cancelled due to only two teams (Brazil and Canada) entered | | | | 2009 World Aquatics Championships | |
| 2011 | Victoria, Canada | Canada | Brazil | Argentina | — | 2011 World Aquatics Championships | |
| 2013 | Calgary, Canada | Canada | United States | Brazil | Argentina | 2013 World Aquatics Championships | |
| 2013* | Costa Mesa, United States | United States | Canada | | | 2014 FINA World Cup | |
| 2015 | Markham, Canada | Canada | Brazil | Argentina | — | 2015 World Aquatics Championships | |
| 2017 | Couva, Trinidad and Tobago | Brazil | Canada | Argentina | Trinidad and Tobago | 2017 World Aquatics Championships | |
| 2018* | Cochabamba, Bolivia | Colombia | Argentina | Chile | Bolivia | 2018 FINA World Cup | |
| 2019 | São Paulo, Brazil | Brazil | United States | Canada | Argentina | 2019 World Aquatics Championships | |
| 2023 | Bauru, Brazil | Canada | Brazil | Argentina | — | 2023 World Aquatics Championship | |
| 2024 | Ibagué, Colombia | Brazil | Canada | Argentina | Colombia | 2025 World Aquatics Championship | |

(*): World Cup qualifiers event

== Women's competition ==
| Year | Host | Champion | Runner-up | Third place | Fourth place | Qualification for | Ref |
|---|---|---|---|---|---|---|---|
| 2001 | La Romana, Dominican Republic | Cuba | Brazil | — | — | 2001 World Aquatics Championships | |
| 2005 | Mexico City, Mexico | Canada | Cuba | Brazil | Venezuela | 2005 World Aquatics Championships | |
| 2006 | Rio de Janeiro, Brazil | Brazil | Cuba | Puerto Rico | Venezuela | 2007 World Aquatics Championships | |
| 2009 | Calgary, Canada | Cancelled due to only two teams (Brazil and Canada) entered | | | | 2009 World Aquatics Championships | |
| 2011 | São Paulo, Brazil | Cuba | Brazil | Argentina | — | 2011 World Aquatics Championships | |
| 2013 | Calgary, Canada | Canada | Brazil | Venezuela | Argentina | 2013 World Aquatics Championships | |
| 2013* | Costa Mesa, United States | United States | Canada | | | 2014 FINA Women's World Cup | |
| 2015 | Markham, Canada | Canada | Brazil | — | — | 2015 World Aquatics Championships | |
| 2017 | Not scheduled | | | | | 2017 World Aquatics Championships | |
| 2019 | São Paulo, Brazil | Canada | Cuba | Brazil | — | 2019 World Aquatics Championships | |
| 2023 | Bauru, Brazil | Canada | Brazil | Argentina | Peru | 2023 World Aquatics Championships | |
| 2024 | Ibagué, Colombia | United States | Argentina | Brazil | Colombia | 2025 World Aquatics Championship | |

(*): World Cup qualifiers event

== See also ==
- Water polo at the Pan American Games
- Swimming Union of the Americas
