= Beach water polo at the 2023 World Beach Games =

- Location: Bali, Indonesia
- Dates: 6–12 August
- Competitors: 168 from TBD nations
- Teams: 24

The Beach water polo tournaments at the 2023 World Beach Games, the first edition of the Games, will be held from 6 to 12 August 2023 in Bali, Indonesia and organised by the Association of National Olympic Committees (ANOC).

Two events will take place: the men's tournament and the women's tournament. A total of 24 teams will participate (12 in the men's competition and 12 in the women's). Both the men's and women's squads can consist of up to 7 players, meaning a total of 168 athletes are expected to take part.

== Competition schedule ==
The tournament will begin on 6 August and end on 12 August.Further details TBA.

== Qualification ==
Each National Olympic Committee (NOC) is allowed to enter one men's team and one women's team into the competition. In order to play at the Games, these teams need to qualify.

=== Men's qualification ===
Event	Dates	Hosts	Quota	Qualifier(s)
Host nation	—N/a	—N/a	1	Indonesia
2022 World Aquatics Championships	21 June – 3 July 2022	(Hungary) Budapest	3	Spain; Italy; Greece
World Beach Water Polo Qualification Tournament	12 – 15 May 2023	(Egypt) Soma Bay	3	Serbia; Hungary; Montenegro
2023 Pan Am Championships	22 – 27 March 2023	(Puerto Rico) Punta Santiago	1	Puerto Rico
2022 Asian Championships	7–14 November 2022	(Thailand) Samut Prakan	1	Japan
2022 European Championships	29 August – 10 September 2022	(Croatia) Split	1	Croatia
African Selection	—N/a	—N/a	1	South Africa
Oceanian Selection	—N/a	—N/a	1	Australia
Total			12	

=== Women's qualification ===
Event	Dates	Hosts	Quota	Qualifier(s)
Host nation	—N/a	—N/a	1	Indonesia
2022 World Aquatics Championships	20 June – 2 July 2022	(Hungary) Budapest	3	United States; Hungary; Netherlands
World Beach Water Polo Qualification Tournament	12 – 15 May 2023	(Egypt) Soma Bay	3	Greece; Czech Republic; South Africa
2023 Pan Am Championships	22 – 27 March 2023	(Puerto Rico) Punta Santiago	1	Puerto Rico
2022 Asian Championships	7–14 November 2022	(Thailand) Samut Prakan	1	China
2022 European Championships	29 August – 10 September 2022	(Croatia) Split	1	Spain
African Selection	—N/a	—N/a	1	
Oceanian Selection	—N/a	—N/a	1	Australia
Total			12	

== Participating NOCs ==
The following National Olympic Committees (NOCs), as per the outcome of qualification events, will participate (the number of expected participating athletes of each NOC are shown in parentheses).

- Indonesia (14)
- Hungary (14)
- Puerto Rico (14)
- Australia (14)
- Spain (14)
- Greece (14)
- South Africa (14)
- United States (7)
- Serbia (7)
- Montenegro (7)
- Japan (7)
- China (7)
- Croatia (7)
- Italy (7)
- Czech Republic (7)
- Netherlands (7)

== Medal summary ==
=== Medal table ===
Rank	Nation	Gold	Silver	Bronze	Total
Totals (0 entries)		0	0	0	0

=== Medalists ===
Event	Gold	Silver	Bronze
Men's tournament			
Women's tournament			

== See also ==
- 2022 World Water polo Championships
- 2022 Men's European Water Polo Championship
- 2022 Women's European Water Polo Championship
