= Water polo at the 2023 World Aquatics Championships – Women's tournament =

Women's tournament

Tournament details
- Host country: Japan
- Venue(s): Marine Messe, Fukuoka
- Dates: 16–28 July
- Teams: 16 (from 5 confederations)

Final positions
- Champions: Netherlands (2nd title)
- Runners-up: Spain
- Third place: Italy
- Fourth place: Australia

Tournament statistics
- Matches played: 48
- Goals scored: 1,157 (24.1 per match)
- Top scorer(s): (Spain) Judith Forca (23 goals)

Awards
- Best player: (Spain) Elena Ruiz
- Best goalkeeper: (Netherlands) Laura Aarts

The women's water polo tournament at the 2023 World Aquatics Championships was held from 16 to 28 July 2023. This was the 16th time that the women's water polo tournament has been played since the first edition in 1986. Netherlands won their second title after defeating Spain in the final.

== Qualification ==
Event	Dates	Hosts	Quota	Qualifier(s)
Host nation	—	—	1	Japan
2022 World League	25 January – 6 November 2022	(Spain) Santa Cruz de Tenerife	2	Spain; Hungary
2022 World Championships	20 June – 2 July 2022	(Hungary) Budapest	4	United States; Netherlands; Italy; Australia
2022 European Championship	27 August – 10 September 2022	(Croatia) Split	3	Greece; Israel; France
2022 Asian Championship	7–14 November 2022	(Thailand) Samut Prakan	2	China; Kazakhstan
2023 Pan American Water Polo Championships	3–8 April 2023	(Brazil) Bauru	2	Canada; ~~Brazil~~; Argentina
African Wildcard	—	—	1	South Africa
Oceanian Wildcard	—	—	1	New Zealand
Total			16	

Due the limited budget and the proximity of the date of the championship with the 2023 Pan American Games, Brazil withdrew before the tournament and was replaced by Argentina.

== Draw ==
The draw was held on 18 April 2023.

=== Seeding ===
The pots were announced on 12 April 2023.

Pot 1	Pot 2	Pot 3	Pot 4
United States; Hungary; Netherlands; Italy	Spain; Australia; Canada; Greece	Argentina; Israel; France; New Zealand	South Africa; Japan; China; Kazakhstan

The draw resulted in the following groups:

Group A	Group B	Group C	Group D
China	Spain	Argentina	Canada
France	Israel	Greece	New Zealand
United States	Netherlands	Italy	Hungary
Australia	Kazakhstan	South Africa	Japan

== Preliminary round ==
All times are local (UTC+9).

=== Group A ===
Pos	Team	Pld	W	PSW	PSL	L	GF	GA	GD	Pts	Qualification
1	United States	3	3	0	0	0	40	16	+24	9	Quarterfinals
2	Australia	3	2	0	0	1	26	24	+2	6	Playoffs
3	France	3	1	0	0	2	25	37	−12	3	Playoffs
4	China	3	0	0	0	3	24	38	−14	0	

Source: Sportresult
Rules for classification: 1) points; 2) head-to-head points; 3) head-to-head goal difference; 4) head-to-head number of goals scored; 5) Goal difference.

16 July 2023; 09:00	Report	United States	15–6	China	Marine Messe Fukuoka, Fukuoka; Referees: Nóra Debreceni (HUN), Frank Ohme (GER)
16 July 2023; 09:00	Report	Score by quarters: 1–0, 6–2, 3–1, 5–3			Marine Messe Fukuoka, Fukuoka; Referees: Nóra Debreceni (HUN), Frank Ohme (GER)
16 July 2023; 09:00	Report	Musselman 4	Goals	Zhang Jin. 3	Marine Messe Fukuoka, Fukuoka; Referees: Nóra Debreceni (HUN), Frank Ohme (GER)

16 July 2023; 10:30	Report	France	8–10	Australia	Marine Messe Fukuoka, Fukuoka; Referees: Hélène Painchaud (CAN), Germán Moller (ARG)
16 July 2023; 10:30	Report	Score by quarters: 3–3, 2–4, 2–1, 1–2			Marine Messe Fukuoka, Fukuoka; Referees: Hélène Painchaud (CAN), Germán Moller (ARG)
16 July 2023; 10:30	Report	Bouloukbachi 3	Goals	Andrews, Fasala 2	Marine Messe Fukuoka, Fukuoka; Referees: Hélène Painchaud (CAN), Germán Moller (ARG)

18 July 2023; 17:30	Report	Australia	5–9	United States	Marine Messe Fukuoka, Fukuoka; Referees: Natalia Markopoulou (GRE), Nóra Debreceni (HUN)
18 July 2023; 17:30	Report	Score by quarters: 3–5, 0–0, 1–3, 1–1			Marine Messe Fukuoka, Fukuoka; Referees: Natalia Markopoulou (GRE), Nóra Debreceni (HUN)
18 July 2023; 17:30	Report	Williams 3	Goals	three players 2	Marine Messe Fukuoka, Fukuoka; Referees: Natalia Markopoulou (GRE), Nóra Debreceni (HUN)

18 July 2023; 20:30	Report	China	11–12	France	Marine Messe Fukuoka, Fukuoka; Referees: Tamás Kovács-Csatlós (HUN), Alessia Ferrari (ITA)
18 July 2023; 20:30	Report	Score by quarters: 4–3, 1–3, 4–1, 2–5			Marine Messe Fukuoka, Fukuoka; Referees: Tamás Kovács-Csatlós (HUN), Alessia Ferrari (ITA)
18 July 2023; 20:30	Report	Wang H. 3	Goals	Dhalluin 4	Marine Messe Fukuoka, Fukuoka; Referees: Tamás Kovács-Csatlós (HUN), Alessia Ferrari (ITA)

20 July 2023; 13:00	Report	China	7–11	Australia	Marine Messe Fukuoka, Fukuoka; Referees: Raffaele Colombo (ITA), Hélène Painchaud (CAN)
20 July 2023; 13:00	Report	Score by quarters: 1–4, 3–2, 1–3, 2–2			Marine Messe Fukuoka, Fukuoka; Referees: Raffaele Colombo (ITA), Hélène Painchaud (CAN)
20 July 2023; 13:00	Report	Lu, Zhang Jin. 2	Goals	five players 2	Marine Messe Fukuoka, Fukuoka; Referees: Raffaele Colombo (ITA), Hélène Painchaud (CAN)

20 July 2023; 16:00	Report	France	5–16	United States	Marine Messe Fukuoka, Fukuoka; Referees: Chisato Kurosaki (JPN), Alessia Ferrari (ITA)
20 July 2023; 16:00	Report	Score by quarters: 1–5, 1–2, 0–4, 3–5			Marine Messe Fukuoka, Fukuoka; Referees: Chisato Kurosaki (JPN), Alessia Ferrari (ITA)
20 July 2023; 16:00	Report	Bouloukbachi 2	Goals	Prentice 4	Marine Messe Fukuoka, Fukuoka; Referees: Chisato Kurosaki (JPN), Alessia Ferrari (ITA)

=== Group B ===
Pos	Team	Pld	W	PSW	PSL	L	GF	GA	GD	Pts	Qualification
1	Netherlands	3	3	0	0	0	61	16	+45	9	Quarterfinals
2	Spain	3	2	0	0	1	52	17	+35	6	Playoffs
3	Israel	3	1	0	0	2	30	52	−22	3	Playoffs
4	Kazakhstan	3	0	0	0	3	13	71	−58	0	

Source: Sportresult
Rules for classification: 1) points; 2) head-to-head points; 3) head-to-head goal difference; 4) head-to-head number of goals scored; 5) Goal difference.

16 July 2023; 12:00	Report	Netherlands	7–6	Spain	Marine Messe Fukuoka, Fukuoka; Referees: Alessia Ferrari (ITA), Nenad Peris (CRO)
16 July 2023; 12:00	Report	Score by quarters: 1–2, 1–1, 3–2, 2–1			Marine Messe Fukuoka, Fukuoka; Referees: Alessia Ferrari (ITA), Nenad Peris (CRO)
16 July 2023; 12:00	Report	three players 2	Goals	E. Ruiz 3	Marine Messe Fukuoka, Fukuoka; Referees: Alessia Ferrari (ITA), Nenad Peris (CRO)

16 July 2023; 13:30	Report	Israel	17–6	Kazakhstan	Marine Messe Fukuoka, Fukuoka; Referees: Natalia Markopoulou (GRE), Lee-Anne Stewart (RSA)
16 July 2023; 13:30	Report	Score by quarters: 5–3, 6–1, 2–2, 4–0			Marine Messe Fukuoka, Fukuoka; Referees: Natalia Markopoulou (GRE), Lee-Anne Stewart (RSA)
16 July 2023; 13:30	Report	three players 4	Goals	Khritankova, Mirshina 2	Marine Messe Fukuoka, Fukuoka; Referees: Natalia Markopoulou (GRE), Lee-Anne Stewart (RSA)

18 July 2023; 09:00	Report	Kazakhstan	2–30	Netherlands	Marine Messe Fukuoka, Fukuoka; Referees: Hélène Painchaud (CAN), Germán Moller (ARG)
18 July 2023; 09:00	Report	Score by quarters: 0–10, 1–7, 1–9, 0–4			Marine Messe Fukuoka, Fukuoka; Referees: Hélène Painchaud (CAN), Germán Moller (ARG)
18 July 2023; 09:00	Report	Mirshina, Pochinok 1	Goals	Van de Kraats 8	Marine Messe Fukuoka, Fukuoka; Referees: Hélène Painchaud (CAN), Germán Moller (ARG)

18 July 2023; 10:30	Report	Spain	22–5	Israel	Marine Messe Fukuoka, Fukuoka; Referees: Lee-Anne Stewart (RSA), David Couper (NZL)
18 July 2023; 10:30	Report	Score by quarters: 5–2, 5–1, 5–0, 7–2			Marine Messe Fukuoka, Fukuoka; Referees: Lee-Anne Stewart (RSA), David Couper (NZL)
18 July 2023; 10:30	Report	Camus, A. Ruiz 4	Goals	five players 1	Marine Messe Fukuoka, Fukuoka; Referees: Lee-Anne Stewart (RSA), David Couper (NZL)

20 July 2023; 17:30	Report	Spain	24–5	Kazakhstan	Marine Messe Fukuoka, Fukuoka; Referees: Nóra Debreceni (HUN), Lee-Anne Stewart (RSA)
20 July 2023; 17:30	Report	Score by quarters: 5–3, 8–1, 5–0, 6–1			Marine Messe Fukuoka, Fukuoka; Referees: Nóra Debreceni (HUN), Lee-Anne Stewart (RSA)
20 July 2023; 17:30	Report	Peña 4	Goals	Novikova, Tsoy 2	Marine Messe Fukuoka, Fukuoka; Referees: Nóra Debreceni (HUN), Lee-Anne Stewart (RSA)

20 July 2023; 20:30	Report	Israel	8–24	Netherlands	Marine Messe Fukuoka, Fukuoka; Referees: Natalia Markopoulou (GRE), David Couper (NZL)
20 July 2023; 20:30	Report	Score by quarters: 1–7, 1–6, 2–5, 4–6			Marine Messe Fukuoka, Fukuoka; Referees: Natalia Markopoulou (GRE), David Couper (NZL)
20 July 2023; 20:30	Report	Futorian 3	Goals	Joustra 5	Marine Messe Fukuoka, Fukuoka; Referees: Natalia Markopoulou (GRE), David Couper (NZL)

=== Group C ===
Pos	Team	Pld	W	PSW	PSL	L	GF	GA	GD	Pts	Qualification
1	Greece	3	3	0	0	0	61	16	+45	9	Quarterfinals
2	Italy	3	2	0	0	1	63	19	+44	6	Playoffs
3	South Africa	3	1	0	0	2	16	57	−41	3	Playoffs
4	Argentina	3	0	0	0	3	12	60	−48	0	

Source: Sportresult
Rules for classification: 1) points; 2) head-to-head points; 3) head-to-head goal difference; 4) head-to-head number of goals scored; 5) Goal difference.

16 July 2023; 16:00	Report	Italy	27–1	Argentina	Marine Messe Fukuoka, Fukuoka; Referees: Adil Aimbetov (KAZ), Sébastien Dervieux (FRA)
16 July 2023; 16:00	Report	Score by quarters: 3–1, 7–0, 6–0, 11–0			Marine Messe Fukuoka, Fukuoka; Referees: Adil Aimbetov (KAZ), Sébastien Dervieux (FRA)
16 July 2023; 16:00	Report	Avegno 4	Goals	Leonard 1	Marine Messe Fukuoka, Fukuoka; Referees: Adil Aimbetov (KAZ), Sébastien Dervieux (FRA)

16 July 2023; 17:30	Report	Greece	24–2	South Africa	Marine Messe Fukuoka, Fukuoka; Referees: Nicola Johnson (AUS), Darren Spiritsanto (USA)
16 July 2023; 17:30	Report	Score by quarters: 7–1, 6–1, 6–0, 5–0			Marine Messe Fukuoka, Fukuoka; Referees: Nicola Johnson (AUS), Darren Spiritsanto (USA)
16 July 2023; 17:30	Report	Fountotou, E. Plevritou 4	Goals	Sileno, Zondo 1	Marine Messe Fukuoka, Fukuoka; Referees: Nicola Johnson (AUS), Darren Spiritsanto (USA)

18 July 2023; 12:00	Report	South Africa	2–24	Italy	Marine Messe Fukuoka, Fukuoka; Referees: Jennifer McCall (USA), Chisato Kurosaki (JPN)
18 July 2023; 12:00	Report	Score by quarters: 1–2, 0–7, 1–7, 0–8			Marine Messe Fukuoka, Fukuoka; Referees: Jennifer McCall (USA), Chisato Kurosaki (JPN)
18 July 2023; 12:00	Report	MacDonell, Meecham 1	Goals	Bettini, Giustini 4	Marine Messe Fukuoka, Fukuoka; Referees: Jennifer McCall (USA), Chisato Kurosaki (JPN)

18 July 2023; 13:30	Report	Argentina	2–21	Greece	Marine Messe Fukuoka, Fukuoka; Referees: Adil Aimbetov (KAZ), Nicola Johnson (AUS)
18 July 2023; 13:30	Report	Score by quarters: 1–6, 0–5, 1–6, 0–4			Marine Messe Fukuoka, Fukuoka; Referees: Adil Aimbetov (KAZ), Nicola Johnson (AUS)
18 July 2023; 13:30	Report	Bacigalupo, Hatcher 1	Goals	three players 3	Marine Messe Fukuoka, Fukuoka; Referees: Adil Aimbetov (KAZ), Nicola Johnson (AUS)

20 July 2023; 09:00	Report	Argentina	9–12	South Africa	Marine Messe Fukuoka, Fukuoka; Referees: David Gómez (ESP), Jennifer McCall (USA),
20 July 2023; 09:00	Report	Score by quarters: 2–2, 3–5, 2–2, 2–3			Marine Messe Fukuoka, Fukuoka; Referees: David Gómez (ESP), Jennifer McCall (USA),
20 July 2023; 09:00	Report	Auliel 4	Goals	Meecham 3	Marine Messe Fukuoka, Fukuoka; Referees: David Gómez (ESP), Jennifer McCall (USA),

20 July 2023; 10:30	Report	Greece	16–12	Italy	Marine Messe Fukuoka, Fukuoka; Referees: Nenad Peris (CRO), Matan Schwartz (ISR)
20 July 2023; 10:30	Report	Score by quarters: 6–4, 4–1, 3–2, 3–5			Marine Messe Fukuoka, Fukuoka; Referees: Nenad Peris (CRO), Matan Schwartz (ISR)
20 July 2023; 10:30	Report	four players 3	Goals	four players 2	Marine Messe Fukuoka, Fukuoka; Referees: Nenad Peris (CRO), Matan Schwartz (ISR)

=== Group D ===
Pos	Team	Pld	W	PSW	PSL	L	GF	GA	GD	Pts	Qualification
1	Hungary	3	3	0	0	0	60	36	+24	9	Quarterfinals
2	Canada	3	2	0	0	1	40	34	+6	6	Playoffs
3	New Zealand	3	1	0	0	2	33	52	−19	3	Playoffs
4	Japan (H)	3	0	0	0	3	49	60	−11	0	

Source: Sportresult
Rules for classification: 1) points; 2) head-to-head points; 3) head-to-head goal difference; 4) head-to-head number of goals scored; 5) Goal difference.
(H) Host

16 July 2023; 19:00	Report	New Zealand	17–16	Japan	Marine Messe Fukuoka, Fukuoka; Referees: Jennifer McCall (USA), Matan Schwartz (ISR)
16 July 2023; 19:00	Report	Score by quarters: 5–5, 4–3, 4–5, 4–3			Marine Messe Fukuoka, Fukuoka; Referees: Jennifer McCall (USA), Matan Schwartz (ISR)
16 July 2023; 19:00	Report	Doyle 5	Goals	Ura 5	Marine Messe Fukuoka, Fukuoka; Referees: Jennifer McCall (USA), Matan Schwartz (ISR)

16 July 2023; 20:30	Report	Hungary	11–10	Canada	Marine Messe Fukuoka, Fukuoka; Referees: Marta Cabanas (ESP), Zhang Liang (CHN)
16 July 2023; 20:30	Report	Score by quarters: 5–3, 2–2, 1–2, 3–3			Marine Messe Fukuoka, Fukuoka; Referees: Marta Cabanas (ESP), Zhang Liang (CHN)
16 July 2023; 20:30	Report	Keszthelyi 4	Goals	four players 2	Marine Messe Fukuoka, Fukuoka; Referees: Marta Cabanas (ESP), Zhang Liang (CHN)

18 July 2023; 16:00	Report	Canada	13–11	New Zealand	Marine Messe Fukuoka, Fukuoka; Referees: Marta Cabanas (ESP), Darren Spiritsanto (USA)
18 July 2023; 16:00	Report	Score by quarters: 7–4, 1–3, 3–0, 2–4			Marine Messe Fukuoka, Fukuoka; Referees: Marta Cabanas (ESP), Darren Spiritsanto (USA)
18 July 2023; 16:00	Report	La Roche 3	Goals	Howarth 4	Marine Messe Fukuoka, Fukuoka; Referees: Marta Cabanas (ESP), Darren Spiritsanto (USA)

18 July 2023; 19:00	Report	Japan	21–26	Hungary	Marine Messe Fukuoka, Fukuoka; Referees: Matan Schwartz (ISR), Frank Ohme (GER)
18 July 2023; 19:00	Report	Score by quarters: 4–5, 6–8, 5–7, 6–6			Marine Messe Fukuoka, Fukuoka; Referees: Matan Schwartz (ISR), Frank Ohme (GER)
18 July 2023; 19:00	Report	Arima 7	Goals	Hajdú 5	Marine Messe Fukuoka, Fukuoka; Referees: Matan Schwartz (ISR), Frank Ohme (GER)

20 July 2023; 12:00	Report	New Zealand	5–23	Hungary	Marine Messe Fukuoka, Fukuoka; Referees: Veselin Mišković (MNE), Marta Cabanas (ESP),
20 July 2023; 12:00	Report	Score by quarters: 3–6, 0–3, 2–9, 0–5			Marine Messe Fukuoka, Fukuoka; Referees: Veselin Mišković (MNE), Marta Cabanas (ESP),
20 July 2023; 12:00	Report	Doyle, Houghton 2	Goals	Szilágyi 5	Marine Messe Fukuoka, Fukuoka; Referees: Veselin Mišković (MNE), Marta Cabanas (ESP),

20 July 2023; 19:00	Report	Canada	17–12	Japan	Marine Messe Fukuoka, Fukuoka; Referees: Adil Aimbetov (KAZ), Nicola Johnson (AUS)
20 July 2023; 19:00	Report	Score by quarters: 5–1, 3–3, 5–4, 4–4			Marine Messe Fukuoka, Fukuoka; Referees: Adil Aimbetov (KAZ), Nicola Johnson (AUS)
20 July 2023; 19:00	Report	Lemay-Lavoie 5	Goals	Arima, Kawaguchi 4	Marine Messe Fukuoka, Fukuoka; Referees: Adil Aimbetov (KAZ), Nicola Johnson (AUS)

== Knockout stage ==
=== Bracket ===
Championship bracket

Playoffs
22 July
Italy	14
New Zealand	7
22 July
South Africa	6
Canada	21
22 July
Australia	16
Israel	7
22 July
France	9
Spain	16

Quarter-finals
24 July
United States	7
Italy	8
24 July
Netherlands	17
Canada	10
24 July
Greece	8
Australia	9
24 July
Hungary	9
Spain	12

Semi-finals
26 July
Italy	8
Netherlands	9
26 July
Australia	10
Spain	12

Final
28 July
Netherlands (PSO)	12 (5)
Spain	12 (4)
Third place
28 July
Italy	16
Australia	14

5th place bracket

5th–8th place semifinals
26 July
United States	16
Canada	4
26 July
Greece	9
Hungary	10

Fifth place game
28 July
United States (PSO)	11 (4)
Hungary	11 (2)
Seventh place game
28 July
Canada (PSO)	10 (4)
Greece	10 (2)

9th place bracket

9th–12th place semifinals
24 July
Israel	15
New Zealand	12
24 July
France	20
South Africa	6

Ninth place game
26 July
Israel	7
France	11
Eleventh place game
26 July
New Zealand	25
South Africa	6

13th place bracket

13th–16th place semifinals
22 July
China	16
Kazakhstan	6
22 July
Argentina	11
Japan	21

13th place game
24 July
China	18
Japan	10
15th place game
24 July
Kazakhstan	10
Argentina	8

=== Playoffs ===
22 July 2023; 14:00	Report	Australia	16–7	Israel	Marine Messe Fukuoka, Fukuoka; Referees: Marta Cabanas (ESP), Adil Aimbetov (KAZ)
22 July 2023; 14:00	Report	Score by quarters: 7–2, 4–1, 3–1, 2–3			Marine Messe Fukuoka, Fukuoka; Referees: Marta Cabanas (ESP), Adil Aimbetov (KAZ)
22 July 2023; 14:00	Report	Armit 4	Goals	Kordonskaia 3	Marine Messe Fukuoka, Fukuoka; Referees: Marta Cabanas (ESP), Adil Aimbetov (KAZ)

22 July 2023; 15:30	Report	France	9–16	Spain	Marine Messe Fukuoka, Fukuoka; Referees: Matan Schwartz (ISR), Raffaele Colombo (ITA)
22 July 2023; 15:30	Report	Score by quarters: 1–3, 4–4, 2–5, 2–4			Marine Messe Fukuoka, Fukuoka; Referees: Matan Schwartz (ISR), Raffaele Colombo (ITA)
22 July 2023; 15:30	Report	Bouloukbachi, Dhalluin 2	Goals	Forca 5	Marine Messe Fukuoka, Fukuoka; Referees: Matan Schwartz (ISR), Raffaele Colombo (ITA)

22 July 2023; 17:00	Report	Italy	14–7	New Zealand	Marine Messe Fukuoka, Fukuoka; Referees: Germán Moller (ARG), Chisato Kurosaki (JPN)
22 July 2023; 17:00	Report	Score by quarters: 4–1, 6–2, 1–3, 3–1			Marine Messe Fukuoka, Fukuoka; Referees: Germán Moller (ARG), Chisato Kurosaki (JPN)
22 July 2023; 17:00	Report	Bettini 3	Goals	Doyle 2	Marine Messe Fukuoka, Fukuoka; Referees: Germán Moller (ARG), Chisato Kurosaki (JPN)

22 July 2023; 18:30	Report	South Africa	6–21	Canada	Marine Messe Fukuoka, Fukuoka; Referees: Nicola Johnson (AUS), David Couper (NZL)
22 July 2023; 18:30	Report	Score by quarters: 1–6, 1–4, 1–4, 3–7			Marine Messe Fukuoka, Fukuoka; Referees: Nicola Johnson (AUS), David Couper (NZL)
22 July 2023; 18:30	Report	Thornton-Dibb 2	Goals	Wright 4	Marine Messe Fukuoka, Fukuoka; Referees: Nicola Johnson (AUS), David Couper (NZL)

=== Quarterfinals ===
24 July 2023; 15:00	Report	United States	7–8	Italy	Marine Messe Fukuoka, Fukuoka; Referees: Matan Schwartz (ISR), Zhang Liang (CHN)
24 July 2023; 15:00	Report	Score by quarters: 2–3, 2–1, 2–2, 1–2			Marine Messe Fukuoka, Fukuoka; Referees: Matan Schwartz (ISR), Zhang Liang (CHN)
24 July 2023; 15:00	Report	Steffens 4	Goals	Giustini 3	Marine Messe Fukuoka, Fukuoka; Referees: Matan Schwartz (ISR), Zhang Liang (CHN)

24 July 2023; 16:30	Report	Netherlands	17–10	Canada	Marine Messe Fukuoka, Fukuoka; Referees: Marta Cabanas (ESP), Natalia Markopoulou (GRE)
24 July 2023; 16:30	Report	Score by quarters: 6–2, 5–3, 3–4, 3–1			Marine Messe Fukuoka, Fukuoka; Referees: Marta Cabanas (ESP), Natalia Markopoulou (GRE)
24 July 2023; 16:30	Report	three players 3	Goals	McKelvey 4	Marine Messe Fukuoka, Fukuoka; Referees: Marta Cabanas (ESP), Natalia Markopoulou (GRE)

24 July 2023; 18:00	Report	Greece	8–9	Australia	Marine Messe Fukuoka, Fukuoka; Referees: Jennifer McCall (USA), Sébastien Dervieux (FRA)
24 July 2023; 18:00	Report	Score by quarters: 4–3, 1–4, 3–2, 0–0			Marine Messe Fukuoka, Fukuoka; Referees: Jennifer McCall (USA), Sébastien Dervieux (FRA)
24 July 2023; 18:00	Report	Xenaki 3	Goals	four players 2	Marine Messe Fukuoka, Fukuoka; Referees: Jennifer McCall (USA), Sébastien Dervieux (FRA)

24 July 2023; 19:30	Report	Hungary	9–12	Spain	Marine Messe Fukuoka, Fukuoka; Referees: Alessia Ferrari (ITA), Nenad Peris (CRO)
24 July 2023; 19:30	Report	Score by quarters: 2–3, 2–3, 3–4, 2–2			Marine Messe Fukuoka, Fukuoka; Referees: Alessia Ferrari (ITA), Nenad Peris (CRO)
24 July 2023; 19:30	Report	Garda 4	Goals	Forca 5	Marine Messe Fukuoka, Fukuoka; Referees: Alessia Ferrari (ITA), Nenad Peris (CRO)

=== 13–16th place semifinals ===
22 July 2023; 09:00	Report	China	16–6	Kazakhstan	Marine Messe Fukuoka, Fukuoka; Referees: Jennifer McCall (USA), Hélène Painchaud (CAN)
22 July 2023; 09:00	Report	Score by quarters: 3–1, 6–2, 3–2, 4–1			Marine Messe Fukuoka, Fukuoka; Referees: Jennifer McCall (USA), Hélène Painchaud (CAN)
22 July 2023; 09:00	Report	Yan S., Zhang J. 4	Goals	Kaplun 3	Marine Messe Fukuoka, Fukuoka; Referees: Jennifer McCall (USA), Hélène Painchaud (CAN)

22 July 2023; 10:30	Report	Argentina	11–21	Japan	Marine Messe Fukuoka, Fukuoka; Referees: Alessia Ferrari (ITA), Lee-Anne Stewart (RSA)
22 July 2023; 10:30	Report	Score by quarters: 0–8, 3–4, 5–4, 3–5			Marine Messe Fukuoka, Fukuoka; Referees: Alessia Ferrari (ITA), Lee-Anne Stewart (RSA)
22 July 2023; 10:30	Report	Bacigalupo 3	Goals	Arima, Nishiyama 4	Marine Messe Fukuoka, Fukuoka; Referees: Alessia Ferrari (ITA), Lee-Anne Stewart (RSA)

=== 9–12th place semifinals ===
24 July 2023; 12:00	Report	Israel	15–12	New Zealand	Marine Messe Fukuoka, Fukuoka; Referees: Nóra Debreceni (HUN), Chisato Kurosaki (JPN)
24 July 2023; 12:00	Report	Score by quarters: 3–1, 5–3, 5–2, 2–6			Marine Messe Fukuoka, Fukuoka; Referees: Nóra Debreceni (HUN), Chisato Kurosaki (JPN)
24 July 2023; 12:00	Report	Strugo 4	Goals	Houghton, Nicholson 3	Marine Messe Fukuoka, Fukuoka; Referees: Nóra Debreceni (HUN), Chisato Kurosaki (JPN)

24 July 2023; 13:30	Report	France	20–6	South Africa	Marine Messe Fukuoka, Fukuoka; Referees: Hélène Painchaud (CAN), Germán Moller (ARG)
24 July 2023; 13:30	Report	Score by quarters: 4–1, 6–0, 5–4, 5–1			Marine Messe Fukuoka, Fukuoka; Referees: Hélène Painchaud (CAN), Germán Moller (ARG)
24 July 2023; 13:30	Report	Vernoux 6	Goals	Thornton-Dibb 3	Marine Messe Fukuoka, Fukuoka; Referees: Hélène Painchaud (CAN), Germán Moller (ARG)

=== 5–8th place semifinals ===
26 July 2023; 14:00	Report	United States	16–4	Canada	Marine Messe Fukuoka, Fukuoka; Referees: Alessia Ferrari (ITA), Lee-Anne Stewart (RSA)
26 July 2023; 14:00	Report	Score by quarters: 5–1, 2–1, 6–1, 3–1			Marine Messe Fukuoka, Fukuoka; Referees: Alessia Ferrari (ITA), Lee-Anne Stewart (RSA)
26 July 2023; 14:00	Report	Flynn 5	Goals	Browne 2	Marine Messe Fukuoka, Fukuoka; Referees: Alessia Ferrari (ITA), Lee-Anne Stewart (RSA)

26 July 2023; 15:30	Report	Greece	9–10	Hungary	Marine Messe Fukuoka, Fukuoka; Referees: Matan Schwartz (ISR), Zhang Liang (CHN)
26 July 2023; 15:30	Report	Score by quarters: 1–2, 2–2, 4–5, 2–1			Marine Messe Fukuoka, Fukuoka; Referees: Matan Schwartz (ISR), Zhang Liang (CHN)
26 July 2023; 15:30	Report	Ninou 3	Goals	Garda, Keszthelyi 3	Marine Messe Fukuoka, Fukuoka; Referees: Matan Schwartz (ISR), Zhang Liang (CHN)

=== Semifinals ===
26 July 2023; 17:00	Report	Italy	8–9	Netherlands	Marine Messe Fukuoka, Fukuoka; Referees: Sébastien Dervieux (FRA), Nóra Debreceni (HUN)
26 July 2023; 17:00	Report	Score by quarters: 2–4, 3–2, 2–2, 1–1			Marine Messe Fukuoka, Fukuoka; Referees: Sébastien Dervieux (FRA), Nóra Debreceni (HUN)
26 July 2023; 17:00	Report	Marletta 3	Goals	L. Rogge, Wolves 2	Marine Messe Fukuoka, Fukuoka; Referees: Sébastien Dervieux (FRA), Nóra Debreceni (HUN)

26 July 2023; 18:30	Report	Australia	10–12	Spain	Marine Messe Fukuoka, Fukuoka; Referees: Georgios Stavridis (GRE), Jennifer McCall (USA)
26 July 2023; 18:30	Report	Score by quarters: 2–5, 4–3, 2–2, 2–2			Marine Messe Fukuoka, Fukuoka; Referees: Georgios Stavridis (GRE), Jennifer McCall (USA)
26 July 2023; 18:30	Report	Kearns 3	Goals	E. Ruiz 4	Marine Messe Fukuoka, Fukuoka; Referees: Georgios Stavridis (GRE), Jennifer McCall (USA)

=== 15th place game ===
24 July 2023; 09:00	Report	Kazakhstan	10–8	Argentina	Marine Messe Fukuoka, Fukuoka; Referees: Raffaele Colombo (ITA), Nicola Johnson (AUS)
24 July 2023; 09:00	Report	Score by quarters: 3–0, 3–3, 2–4, 2–1			Marine Messe Fukuoka, Fukuoka; Referees: Raffaele Colombo (ITA), Nicola Johnson (AUS)
24 July 2023; 09:00	Report	Khritankova, Novikova 3	Goals	Bacigalupo 4	Marine Messe Fukuoka, Fukuoka; Referees: Raffaele Colombo (ITA), Nicola Johnson (AUS)

=== 13th place game ===
24 July 2023; 10:30	Report	China	18–10	Japan	Marine Messe Fukuoka, Fukuoka; Referees: Adil Aimbetov (KAZ), Lee-Anne Stewart (RSA)
24 July 2023; 10:30	Report	Score by quarters: 4–3, 5–3, 4–3, 5–1			Marine Messe Fukuoka, Fukuoka; Referees: Adil Aimbetov (KAZ), Lee-Anne Stewart (RSA)
24 July 2023; 10:30	Report	Lu, Yan J. 3	Goals	Ura 3	Marine Messe Fukuoka, Fukuoka; Referees: Adil Aimbetov (KAZ), Lee-Anne Stewart (RSA)

=== Eleventh place game ===
26 July 2023; 09:00	Report	New Zealand	25–6	South Africa	Marine Messe Fukuoka, Fukuoka; Referees: Chisato Kurosaki (JPN), Adil Aimbetov (KAZ)
26 July 2023; 09:00	Report	Score by quarters: 7–0, 6–3, 6–1, 6–2			Marine Messe Fukuoka, Fukuoka; Referees: Chisato Kurosaki (JPN), Adil Aimbetov (KAZ)
26 July 2023; 09:00	Report	Houghton 7	Goals	Meecham, Versfeld 2	Marine Messe Fukuoka, Fukuoka; Referees: Chisato Kurosaki (JPN), Adil Aimbetov (KAZ)

=== Ninth place game ===
26 July 2023; 10:30	Report	Israel	7–11	France	Marine Messe Fukuoka, Fukuoka; Referees: Nicola Johnson (AUS), Natalia Markopoulou (GRE)
26 July 2023; 10:30	Report	Score by quarters: 2–3, 1–4, 1–4, 3–0			Marine Messe Fukuoka, Fukuoka; Referees: Nicola Johnson (AUS), Natalia Markopoulou (GRE)
26 July 2023; 10:30	Report	Bogachenko 4	Goals	Millot 3	Marine Messe Fukuoka, Fukuoka; Referees: Nicola Johnson (AUS), Natalia Markopoulou (GRE)

=== Seventh place game ===
28 July 2023; 11:30	Report	Canada	14–12 (PSO)	Greece	Marine Messe Fukuoka, Fukuoka; Referees: Nóra Debreceni (HUN), Nicola Johnson (AUS)
28 July 2023; 11:30	Report	Score by quarters: 4–1, 1–4, 4–1, 1–4 PSO: 4–2			Marine Messe Fukuoka, Fukuoka; Referees: Nóra Debreceni (HUN), Nicola Johnson (AUS)
28 July 2023; 11:30	Report	Wright 3	Goals	Xenaki 3	Marine Messe Fukuoka, Fukuoka; Referees: Nóra Debreceni (HUN), Nicola Johnson (AUS)

=== Fifth place game ===
28 July 2023; 16:30	Report	United States	15–13 (PSO)	Hungary	Marine Messe Fukuoka, Fukuoka; Referees: Zhang Liang (CHN), Marta Cabanas (ESP)
28 July 2023; 16:30	Report	Score by quarters: 4–2, 1–3, 5–4, 1–2 PSO: 4–2			Marine Messe Fukuoka, Fukuoka; Referees: Zhang Liang (CHN), Marta Cabanas (ESP)
28 July 2023; 16:30	Report	Raney 3	Goals	Keszthelyi 4	Marine Messe Fukuoka, Fukuoka; Referees: Zhang Liang (CHN), Marta Cabanas (ESP)

=== Third place game ===
28 July 2023; 13:00	Report	Italy	16–14	Australia	Marine Messe Fukuoka, Fukuoka; Referees: Darren Spiritosanto (USA), Matan Schwartz (ISR)
28 July 2023; 13:00	Report	Score by quarters: 5–4, 5–6, 3–1, 3–3			Marine Messe Fukuoka, Fukuoka; Referees: Darren Spiritosanto (USA), Matan Schwartz (ISR)
28 July 2023; 13:00	Report	Bianconi 6	Goals	Williams 3	Marine Messe Fukuoka, Fukuoka; Referees: Darren Spiritosanto (USA), Matan Schwartz (ISR)

=== Final ===
28 July 2023; 18:00	Report	Netherlands	17–16 (PSO)	Spain	Marine Messe Fukuoka, Fukuoka; Referees: Nenad Peris (CRO), Alessia Ferrari (ITA)
28 July 2023; 18:00	Report	Score by quarters: 4–3, 2–3, 3–1, 3–5 PSO: 5–4			Marine Messe Fukuoka, Fukuoka; Referees: Nenad Peris (CRO), Alessia Ferrari (ITA)
28 July 2023; 18:00	Report	Van de Kraats, Sleeking 3	Goals	Forca 5	Marine Messe Fukuoka, Fukuoka; Referees: Nenad Peris (CRO), Alessia Ferrari (ITA)

== Final ranking ==
Rank	Team
1st place, gold medalist(s)	Netherlands
2nd place, silver medalist(s)	Spain
3rd place, bronze medalist(s)	Italy
4	Australia
5	United States
6	Hungary
7	Canada
8	Greece
9	France
10	Israel
11	New Zealand
12	South Africa
13	China
14	Japan
15	Kazakhstan
16	Argentina

Qualified for the 2024 Summer Olympics

2023 Women's Water Polo World Champions

Netherlands
Second title

== Statistics and awards ==
=== Top goalscorers ===
Rank	Name	Goals	Shots	%
1	(Spain) Judith Forca	23	45	51
2	(Netherlands) Simone van de Kraats	20	33	61
3	(Hungary) Rita Keszthelyi	19	39	49
3	(Japan) Yumi Arima	19	40	48
5	(New Zealand) Emmerson Houghton	18	32	56
6	(Italy) Roberta Bianconi	16	37	43
6	(Italy) Sofia Giustini	16	33	48
8	(Italy) Claudia Marletta	15	27	56
8	(Spain) Elena Ruiz	15	30	50
10	(Australia) Alice Williams	14	39	36
10	(Greece) Eirini Ninou	14	30	47
10	(Japan) Eruna Ura	14	23	61
10	(New Zealand) Bernadette Doyle	14	34	41

=== Awards ===
The awards were announced on 29 July 2023.

All-star team
Goalkeeper	(Netherlands) Laura Aarts
Field player	(Japan) Yumi Arima
Field player	(Italy) Roberta Bianconi
Field player	(Spain) Judith Forca
Field player	(Spain) Elena Ruiz
Field player	(Netherlands) Simone van de Kraats
Field player	(Australia) Alice Williams
Other awards
MVP	(Spain) Elena Ruiz
Best goalkeeper	(Netherlands) Laura Aarts
