= Water polo at the 2023 World Aquatics Championships – Men's tournament =

Tournament details
- Host country: Japan
- Venue(s): Marine Messe, Fukuoka
- Dates: 17–29 July
- Teams: 16 (from 5 confederations)

Final positions
- Champions: Hungary (4th title)
- Runners-up: Greece
- Third place: Spain
- Fourth place: Serbia

Tournament statistics
- Matches played: 48
- Goals scored: 1,177 (24.52 per match)
- Top scorers: (Serbia) Strahinja Rašović (25 goals)

Awards
- Best player: (Hungary) Gergő Zalánki
- Best goalkeeper: (Greece) Emmanouil Zerdevas

The men's water polo tournament at the 2023 World Aquatics Championships was held from 17 to 29 July 2023. This was the 20th time that the men's water polo tournament has been played since the first edition in 1973.

Hungary claimed their fourth title by defeating Greece in the final.

== Qualification ==
Event	Dates	Hosts	Quota	Qualifier(s)
Host nation	—N/a	—N/a	1	Japan
2022 World League	8 January – 27 July 2022	(France) Strasbourg	2	Italy; United States
2022 World Championships	21 June – 3 July 2022	(Hungary) Budapest	4	Spain; Greece; Croatia; Serbia
2022 European Championship	29 August – 10 September 2022	(Croatia) Split	3	Hungary; France; Montenegro
2022 Asian Championship	7–14 November 2022	(Thailand) Samut Prakan	2	China; Kazakhstan
2023 Pan American Water Polo Championships	3–8 April 2023	(Brazil) Bauru	2	Canada; ~~Brazil~~; Argentina
African Wildcard	—N/a	—N/a	1	South Africa
Oceanian Wildcard	—N/a	—N/a	1	Australia
Total			16	

Due the limited budget and the proximity of the date of the championship with the 2023 Pan American Games, Brazil opted for the withdrawal before the tournament and was replaced by Argentina.

== Draw ==
The draw was held on 18 April 2023.

=== Seeding ===
The pots were announced on 12 April 2023.

Pot 1	Pot 2	Pot 3	Pot 4
Spain; Greece; Croatia; Italy	Serbia; United States; Canada; Hungary	Argentina; Montenegro; France; Australia	South Africa; Japan; China; Kazakhstan

The draw resulted in the following groups:

Group A	Group B	Group C	Group D
United States	China	Croatia	South Africa
Australia	France	Hungary	Serbia
Kazakhstan	Canada	Argentina	Montenegro
Greece	Italy	Japan	Spain

== Preliminary round ==
All times are local (UTC+9).

=== Group A ===
Pos	Team	Pld	W	PSW	PSL	L	GF	GA	GD	Pts	Qualification
1	Greece	3	3	0	0	0	46	25	+21	9	Quarterfinals
2	United States	3	2	0	0	1	48	28	+20	6	Playoffs
3	Australia	3	1	0	0	2	39	35	+4	3	Playoffs
4	Kazakhstan	3	0	0	0	3	13	58	−45	0	

Source: Sportresult
Rules for classification: 1) points; 2) head-to-head points; 3) head-to-head goal difference; 4) head-to-head number of goals scored; 5) Goal difference.

17 July 2023; 09:00	Report	Kazakhstan	5–18	United States	Marine Messe Fukuoka, Fukuoka; Referees: Chisato Kurosaki (JPN), David Gómez (ESP)
17 July 2023; 09:00	Report	Score by quarters: 1–5, 4–4, 0–4, 0–5			Marine Messe Fukuoka, Fukuoka; Referees: Chisato Kurosaki (JPN), David Gómez (ESP)
17 July 2023; 09:00	Report	Markovich 3	Goals	Abramson 5	Marine Messe Fukuoka, Fukuoka; Referees: Chisato Kurosaki (JPN), David Gómez (ESP)

17 July 2023; 10:30	Report	Australia	9–13	Greece	Marine Messe Fukuoka, Fukuoka; Referees: Adrian-Tiberiu Alexandrescu (ROU), Veselin Mišković (MNE)
17 July 2023; 10:30	Report	Score by quarters: 2–2, 1–3, 3–3, 3–5			Marine Messe Fukuoka, Fukuoka; Referees: Adrian-Tiberiu Alexandrescu (ROU), Veselin Mišković (MNE)
17 July 2023; 10:30	Report	Power 4	Goals	Argyropoulos 3	Marine Messe Fukuoka, Fukuoka; Referees: Adrian-Tiberiu Alexandrescu (ROU), Veselin Mišković (MNE)

19 July 2023; 17:30	Report	Greece	18–2	Kazakhstan	Marine Messe Fukuoka, Fukuoka; Referees: Raffaele Colombo (ITA), Germán Moller (ARG)
19 July 2023; 17:30	Report	Score by quarters: 6–1, 5–0, 4–1, 3–0			Marine Messe Fukuoka, Fukuoka; Referees: Raffaele Colombo (ITA), Germán Moller (ARG)
19 July 2023; 17:30	Report	three players 3	Goals	Akhmetov, Ruday 1	Marine Messe Fukuoka, Fukuoka; Referees: Raffaele Colombo (ITA), Germán Moller (ARG)

19 July 2023; 20:30	Report	United States	16–8	Australia	Marine Messe Fukuoka, Fukuoka; Referees: Boris Margeta (SLO), Vojin Putniković (SRB)
19 July 2023; 20:30	Report	Score by quarters: 3–4, 3–2, 4–1, 6–1			Marine Messe Fukuoka, Fukuoka; Referees: Boris Margeta (SLO), Vojin Putniković (SRB)
19 July 2023; 20:30	Report	Daube 5	Goals	Pavillard, Power 3	Marine Messe Fukuoka, Fukuoka; Referees: Boris Margeta (SLO), Vojin Putniković (SRB)

21 July 2023; 13:30	Report	United States	14–15	Greece	Marine Messe Fukuoka, Fukuoka; Referees: Boris Margeta (SLO), Frank Ohme (GER)
21 July 2023; 13:30	Report	Score by quarters: 3–3, 6–1, 2–4, 3–7			Marine Messe Fukuoka, Fukuoka; Referees: Boris Margeta (SLO), Frank Ohme (GER)
21 July 2023; 13:30	Report	Irving 6	Goals	Genidounias, Papanastasiou 4	Marine Messe Fukuoka, Fukuoka; Referees: Boris Margeta (SLO), Frank Ohme (GER)

21 July 2023; 16:00	Report	Australia	22–6	Kazakhstan	Marine Messe Fukuoka, Fukuoka; Referees: Tamás Kovács-Csatlós (HUN), David Gómez (ESP)
21 July 2023; 16:00	Report	Score by quarters: 7–2, 3–0, 4–2, 8–2			Marine Messe Fukuoka, Fukuoka; Referees: Tamás Kovács-Csatlós (HUN), David Gómez (ESP)
21 July 2023; 16:00	Report	Negus, Poot 4	Goals	Artyukh 2	Marine Messe Fukuoka, Fukuoka; Referees: Tamás Kovács-Csatlós (HUN), David Gómez (ESP)

=== Group B ===
Pos	Team	Pld	W	PSW	PSL	L	GF	GA	GD	Pts	Qualification
1	Italy	3	3	0	0	0	55	17	+38	9	Quarterfinals
2	France	3	2	0	0	1	38	32	+6	6	Playoffs
3	Canada	3	1	0	0	2	30	49	−19	3	Playoffs
4	China	3	0	0	0	3	23	48	−25	0	

Source: Sportresult
Rules for classification: 1) points; 2) head-to-head points; 3) head-to-head goal difference; 4) head-to-head number of goals scored; 5) Goal difference.

17 July 2023; 12:00	Report	Canada	13–10	China	Marine Messe Fukuoka, Fukuoka; Referees: Tamás Kovács-Csatlós (HUN), Nenad Peris (CRO)
17 July 2023; 12:00	Report	Score by quarters: 4–0, 3–6, 4–4, 2–0			Marine Messe Fukuoka, Fukuoka; Referees: Tamás Kovács-Csatlós (HUN), Nenad Peris (CRO)
17 July 2023; 12:00	Report	Constantin-Bicari, Gardijan 3	Goals	Peng 4	Marine Messe Fukuoka, Fukuoka; Referees: Tamás Kovács-Csatlós (HUN), Nenad Peris (CRO)

17 July 2023; 13:30	Report	France	6–13	Italy	Marine Messe Fukuoka, Fukuoka; Referees: Vojin Putniković (SRB), Michiel Zwartt (NED)
17 July 2023; 13:30	Report	Score by quarters: 3–2, 2–3, 0–3, 1–5			Marine Messe Fukuoka, Fukuoka; Referees: Vojin Putniković (SRB), Michiel Zwartt (NED)
17 July 2023; 13:30	Report	Crousillat, Khasz 2	Goals	Fondelli 4	Marine Messe Fukuoka, Fukuoka; Referees: Vojin Putniković (SRB), Michiel Zwartt (NED)

19 July 2023; 09:00	Report	Italy	24–6	Canada	Marine Messe Fukuoka, Fukuoka; Referees: Tamás Kovács-Csatlós (HUN), David Gómez (ESP)
19 July 2023; 09:00	Report	Score by quarters: 6–0, 4–2, 8–4, 6–0			Marine Messe Fukuoka, Fukuoka; Referees: Tamás Kovács-Csatlós (HUN), David Gómez (ESP)
19 July 2023; 09:00	Report	three players 4	Goals	Constantin-Bicari 3	Marine Messe Fukuoka, Fukuoka; Referees: Tamás Kovács-Csatlós (HUN), David Gómez (ESP)

19 July 2023; 10:30	Report	China	8–17	France	Marine Messe Fukuoka, Fukuoka; Referees: Michiel Zwartt (NED), Veselin Mišković (MNE)
19 July 2023; 10:30	Report	Score by quarters: 1–4, 4–6, 0–4, 3–3			Marine Messe Fukuoka, Fukuoka; Referees: Michiel Zwartt (NED), Veselin Mišković (MNE)
19 July 2023; 10:30	Report	Chen R., Xie 2	Goals	Marzouki 4	Marine Messe Fukuoka, Fukuoka; Referees: Michiel Zwartt (NED), Veselin Mišković (MNE)

21 July 2023; 17:30	Report	China	5–18	Italy	Marine Messe Fukuoka, Fukuoka; Referees: Veselin Mišković (MNE), Germán Moller (ARG)
21 July 2023; 17:30	Report	Score by quarters: 2–2, 1–7, 2–6, 0–3			Marine Messe Fukuoka, Fukuoka; Referees: Veselin Mišković (MNE), Germán Moller (ARG)
21 July 2023; 17:30	Report	Chen Z. 2	Goals	Condemi, Di Fulvio 4	Marine Messe Fukuoka, Fukuoka; Referees: Veselin Mišković (MNE), Germán Moller (ARG)

21 July 2023; 20:30	Report	France	15–11	Canada	Marine Messe Fukuoka, Fukuoka; Referees: Nenad Peris (CRO), Vojin Putniković (SRB)
21 July 2023; 20:30	Report	Score by quarters: 5–4, 5–3, 3–2, 2–2			Marine Messe Fukuoka, Fukuoka; Referees: Nenad Peris (CRO), Vojin Putniković (SRB)
21 July 2023; 20:30	Report	three players 3	Goals	three players 3	Marine Messe Fukuoka, Fukuoka; Referees: Nenad Peris (CRO), Vojin Putniković (SRB)

=== Group C ===
Pos	Team	Pld	W	PSW	PSL	L	GF	GA	GD	Pts	Qualification
1	Hungary	3	3	0	0	0	49	31	+18	9	Quarterfinals
2	Croatia	3	2	0	0	1	51	29	+22	6	Playoffs
3	Japan (H)	3	1	0	0	2	40	42	−2	3	Playoffs
4	Argentina	3	0	0	0	3	27	65	−38	0	

Source: Sportresult
Rules for classification: 1) points; 2) head-to-head points; 3) head-to-head goal difference; 4) head-to-head number of goals scored; 5) Goal difference.
(H) Host

17 July 2023; 16:00	Report	Argentina	5–24	Croatia	Marine Messe Fukuoka, Fukuoka; Referees: David Couper (NZL), Jennifer McCall (USA)
17 July 2023; 16:00	Report	Score by quarters: 2–8, 1–4, 0–7, 2–5			Marine Messe Fukuoka, Fukuoka; Referees: David Couper (NZL), Jennifer McCall (USA)
17 July 2023; 16:00	Report	five players 1	Goals	Marinić Kragić 5	Marine Messe Fukuoka, Fukuoka; Referees: David Couper (NZL), Jennifer McCall (USA)

17 July 2023; 19:00	Report	Hungary	16–8	Japan	Marine Messe Fukuoka, Fukuoka; Referees: Zhang Liang (CHN), Nicola Johnson (AUS)
17 July 2023; 19:00	Report	Score by quarters: 4–4, 3–2, 3–1, 6–1			Marine Messe Fukuoka, Fukuoka; Referees: Zhang Liang (CHN), Nicola Johnson (AUS)
17 July 2023; 19:00	Report	Jansik, Zalánki 4	Goals	Suzuki, Takata 2	Marine Messe Fukuoka, Fukuoka; Referees: Zhang Liang (CHN), Nicola Johnson (AUS)

19 July 2023; 12:00	Report	Croatia	10–12	Hungary	Marine Messe Fukuoka, Fukuoka; Referees: Adrian-Tiberiu Alexandrescu (ROU), Frank Ohme (GER)
19 July 2023; 12:00	Report	Score by quarters: 1–3, 2–2, 3–3, 4–4			Marine Messe Fukuoka, Fukuoka; Referees: Adrian-Tiberiu Alexandrescu (ROU), Frank Ohme (GER)
19 July 2023; 12:00	Report	three players 2	Goals	Zalánki 3	Marine Messe Fukuoka, Fukuoka; Referees: Adrian-Tiberiu Alexandrescu (ROU), Frank Ohme (GER)

19 July 2023; 19:00	Report	Japan	20–9	Argentina	Marine Messe Fukuoka, Fukuoka; Referees: Zhang Liang (CHN), Darren Spiritsanto (USA)
19 July 2023; 19:00	Report	Score by quarters: 6–1, 4–2, 4–2, 6–4			Marine Messe Fukuoka, Fukuoka; Referees: Zhang Liang (CHN), Darren Spiritsanto (USA)
19 July 2023; 19:00	Report	Watanabe 5	Goals	Martino 3	Marine Messe Fukuoka, Fukuoka; Referees: Zhang Liang (CHN), Darren Spiritsanto (USA)

21 July 2023; 09:00	Report	Hungary	21–13	Argentina	Marine Messe Fukuoka, Fukuoka; Referees: Zhang Liang (CHN), Alessia Ferrari (ITA)
21 July 2023; 09:00	Report	Score by quarters: 7–1, 5–4, 4–4, 5–4			Marine Messe Fukuoka, Fukuoka; Referees: Zhang Liang (CHN), Alessia Ferrari (ITA)
21 July 2023; 09:00	Report	Vigvári 4	Goals	Camnasio, Corsi 3	Marine Messe Fukuoka, Fukuoka; Referees: Zhang Liang (CHN), Alessia Ferrari (ITA)

21 July 2023; 19:00	Report	Croatia	17–12	Japan	Marine Messe Fukuoka, Fukuoka; Referees: Georgios Stavridis (GRE), Michiel Zwartt (NED)
21 July 2023; 19:00	Report	Score by quarters: 4–3, 3–3, 8–3, 2–3			Marine Messe Fukuoka, Fukuoka; Referees: Georgios Stavridis (GRE), Michiel Zwartt (NED)
21 July 2023; 19:00	Report	Kharkov 4	Goals	Adachi 4	Marine Messe Fukuoka, Fukuoka; Referees: Georgios Stavridis (GRE), Michiel Zwartt (NED)

=== Group D ===
Pos	Team	Pld	W	PSW	PSL	L	GF	GA	GD	Pts	Qualification
1	Spain	3	3	0	0	0	54	27	+27	9	Quarterfinals
2	Serbia	3	1	1	0	1	57	34	+23	5	Playoffs
3	Montenegro	3	1	0	1	1	55	34	+21	4	Playoffs
4	South Africa	3	0	0	0	3	21	92	−71	0	

Source: Sportresult
Rules for classification: 1) points; 2) head-to-head points; 3) head-to-head goal difference; 4) head-to-head number of goals scored; 5) Goal difference.

17 July 2023; 17:30	Report	Montenegro	35–10	South Africa	Marine Messe Fukuoka, Fukuoka; Referees: Sebastien Dervieux (FRA), Georgios Stavridis (GRE)
17 July 2023; 17:30	Report	Score by quarters: 6–1, 10–0, 9–5, 10–4			Marine Messe Fukuoka, Fukuoka; Referees: Sebastien Dervieux (FRA), Georgios Stavridis (GRE)
17 July 2023; 17:30	Report	Radović 7	Goals	four players 2	Marine Messe Fukuoka, Fukuoka; Referees: Sebastien Dervieux (FRA), Georgios Stavridis (GRE)

17 July 2023; 20:30	Report	Serbia	14–16	Spain	Marine Messe Fukuoka, Fukuoka; Referees: Boris Margeta (SLO), Raffaele Colombo (ITA)
17 July 2023; 20:30	Report	Score by quarters: 2–3, 3–5, 5–5, 4–3			Marine Messe Fukuoka, Fukuoka; Referees: Boris Margeta (SLO), Raffaele Colombo (ITA)
17 July 2023; 20:30	Report	Rašović 6	Goals	Granados 5	Marine Messe Fukuoka, Fukuoka; Referees: Boris Margeta (SLO), Raffaele Colombo (ITA)

19 July 2023; 13:30	Report	Spain	11–7	Montenegro	Marine Messe Fukuoka, Fukuoka; Referees: Georgios Stavridis (GRE), Sebastien Dervieux (FRA)
19 July 2023; 13:30	Report	Score by quarters: 2–2, 3–2, 4–2, 2–1			Marine Messe Fukuoka, Fukuoka; Referees: Georgios Stavridis (GRE), Sebastien Dervieux (FRA)
19 July 2023; 13:30	Report	Perrone 5	Goals	Đurđić 2	Marine Messe Fukuoka, Fukuoka; Referees: Georgios Stavridis (GRE), Sebastien Dervieux (FRA)

19 July 2023; 16:00	Report	South Africa	5–30	Serbia	Marine Messe Fukuoka, Fukuoka; Referees: David Couper (NZL), Chisato Kurosaki (JPN)
19 July 2023; 16:00	Report	Score by quarters: 1–8, 1–9, 1–7, 2–6			Marine Messe Fukuoka, Fukuoka; Referees: David Couper (NZL), Chisato Kurosaki (JPN)
19 July 2023; 16:00	Report	Laurenson 2	Goals	Jakšić, Rašović 6	Marine Messe Fukuoka, Fukuoka; Referees: David Couper (NZL), Chisato Kurosaki (JPN)

21 July 2023; 10:30	Report	South Africa	6–27	Spain	Marine Messe Fukuoka, Fukuoka; Referees: Sebastien Dervieux (FRA), Natalia Markopoulou (GRE)
21 July 2023; 10:30	Report	Score by quarters: 2–8, 2–7, 2–8, 0–4			Marine Messe Fukuoka, Fukuoka; Referees: Sebastien Dervieux (FRA), Natalia Markopoulou (GRE)
21 July 2023; 10:30	Report	Badenhorst 2	Goals	Valera 5	Marine Messe Fukuoka, Fukuoka; Referees: Sebastien Dervieux (FRA), Natalia Markopoulou (GRE)

21 July 2023; 12:00	Report	Serbia	17–15 (PSO)	Montenegro	Marine Messe Fukuoka, Fukuoka; Referees: Adrian-Tiberiu Alexandrescu (ROU), Darren Spiritsanto (USA)
21 July 2023; 12:00	Report	Score by quarters: 3–6, 4–2, 2–3, 4–2 PSO: 4–2			Marine Messe Fukuoka, Fukuoka; Referees: Adrian-Tiberiu Alexandrescu (ROU), Darren Spiritsanto (USA)
21 July 2023; 12:00	Report	Vučinić 5	Goals	Matković 3	Marine Messe Fukuoka, Fukuoka; Referees: Adrian-Tiberiu Alexandrescu (ROU), Darren Spiritsanto (USA)

== Knockout stage ==
=== Bracket ===
Championship bracket

Playoffs
23 July
Croatia	12
Montenegro	13
23 July
Japan	10
Serbia	16
23 July
United States	13
Canada	10
23 July
Australia	8
France	11

Quarter-finals
25 July
Greece	10
Montenegro	9
25 July
Italy	11 (3)
Serbia (PSO)	11 (4)
25 July
Hungary	13
United States	12
25 July
Spain	7
France	6

Semi-finals
27 July
Greece	13
Serbia	7
27 July
Hungary	12
Spain	11

Final
29 July
Greece	10 (3)
Hungary (PSO)	10 (4)
Third place
29 July
Serbia	6
Spain	9

5th place bracket

5th–8th place semifinals
27 July
Montenegro	6
Italy	10
27 July
United States	13 (3)
France (PSO)	13 (5)

Fifth place game
29 July
Italy	16
France	9
Seventh place game
29 July
Montenegro	12 (3)
United States (PSO)	12 (5)

9th place bracket

9th–12th place semifinals
25 July
Canada	5
Croatia	13
25 July
Australia	16
Japan	15

Ninth place game
27 July
Croatia	17
Australia	10
Eleventh place game
27 July
Canada	11
Japan	23

13th place bracket

13th–16th place semifinals
23 July
Kazakhstan	12
China	5
23 July
Argentina	15
South Africa	6

13th place game
25 July
Kazakhstan	7
Argentina	11
15th place game
25 July
China	16
South Africa	8

=== Playoffs ===
23 July 2023; 14:00	Report	United States	13–10	Canada	Marine Messe Fukuoka, Fukuoka; Referees: Sebastien Dervieux (FRA), David Gómez (ESP)
23 July 2023; 14:00	Report	Score by quarters: 3–1, 3–4, 2–1, 5–4			Marine Messe Fukuoka, Fukuoka; Referees: Sebastien Dervieux (FRA), David Gómez (ESP)
23 July 2023; 14:00	Report	Daube 7	Goals	Constantin-Bicari 4	Marine Messe Fukuoka, Fukuoka; Referees: Sebastien Dervieux (FRA), David Gómez (ESP)

23 July 2023; 15:30	Report	Australia	8–11	France	Marine Messe Fukuoka, Fukuoka; Referees: Adrian-Tiberiu Alexandrescu (ROU), Darren Spiritsanto (USA)
23 July 2023; 15:30	Report	Score by quarters: 0–4, 5–2, 2–4, 1–1			Marine Messe Fukuoka, Fukuoka; Referees: Adrian-Tiberiu Alexandrescu (ROU), Darren Spiritsanto (USA)
23 July 2023; 15:30	Report	Negus, Pavillard 2	Goals	Vernoux 4	Marine Messe Fukuoka, Fukuoka; Referees: Adrian-Tiberiu Alexandrescu (ROU), Darren Spiritsanto (USA)

23 July 2023; 17:00	Report	Croatia	12–13	Montenegro	Marine Messe Fukuoka, Fukuoka; Referees: Boris Margeta (SLO), Michiel Zwartt (NED)
23 July 2023; 17:00	Report	Score by quarters: 3–2, 0–3, 5–4, 4–4			Marine Messe Fukuoka, Fukuoka; Referees: Boris Margeta (SLO), Michiel Zwartt (NED)
23 July 2023; 17:00	Report	Marinić Kragić 4	Goals	Matković, Radović 4	Marine Messe Fukuoka, Fukuoka; Referees: Boris Margeta (SLO), Michiel Zwartt (NED)

23 July 2023; 18:30	Report	Japan	10–16	Serbia	Marine Messe Fukuoka, Fukuoka; Referees: Tamás Kovács-Csatlós (HUN), Veselin Mišković (MNE)
23 July 2023; 18:30	Report	Score by quarters: 3–3, 2–3, 2–7, 3–3			Marine Messe Fukuoka, Fukuoka; Referees: Tamás Kovács-Csatlós (HUN), Veselin Mišković (MNE)
23 July 2023; 18:30	Report	Inaba 4	Goals	Radulović, Rašović 3	Marine Messe Fukuoka, Fukuoka; Referees: Tamás Kovács-Csatlós (HUN), Veselin Mišković (MNE)

=== Quarterfinals ===
25 July 2023; 15:00	Report	Greece	10–9	Montenegro	Marine Messe Fukuoka, Fukuoka; Referees: Boris Margeta (SLO), Tamás Kovács-Csatlós (HUN)
25 July 2023; 15:00	Report	Score by quarters: 2–1, 4–3, 1–3, 3–2			Marine Messe Fukuoka, Fukuoka; Referees: Boris Margeta (SLO), Tamás Kovács-Csatlós (HUN)
25 July 2023; 15:00	Report	Genidounias 5	Goals	Radović 3	Marine Messe Fukuoka, Fukuoka; Referees: Boris Margeta (SLO), Tamás Kovács-Csatlós (HUN)

25 July 2023; 16:30	Report	Italy	14–15 (PSO)	Serbia	Marine Messe Fukuoka, Fukuoka; Referees: Michiel Zwartt (NED), Frank Ohme (GER)
25 July 2023; 16:30	Report	Score by quarters: 3–3, 2–2, 4–4, 2–2 PSO: 3–4			Marine Messe Fukuoka, Fukuoka; Referees: Michiel Zwartt (NED), Frank Ohme (GER)
25 July 2023; 16:30	Report	Di Fulvio 3	Goals	Rašović 4	Marine Messe Fukuoka, Fukuoka; Referees: Michiel Zwartt (NED), Frank Ohme (GER)

25 July 2023; 18:00	Report	Hungary	13–12	United States	Marine Messe Fukuoka, Fukuoka; Referees: Adrian-Tiberiu Alexandrescu (ROU), Vojin Putniković (SRB)
25 July 2023; 18:00	Report	Score by quarters: 4–4, 3–1, 3–2, 3–5			Marine Messe Fukuoka, Fukuoka; Referees: Adrian-Tiberiu Alexandrescu (ROU), Vojin Putniković (SRB)
25 July 2023; 18:00	Report	Zalánki 6	Goals	Bowen 4	Marine Messe Fukuoka, Fukuoka; Referees: Adrian-Tiberiu Alexandrescu (ROU), Vojin Putniković (SRB)

25 July 2023; 19:30	Report	Spain	7–6	France	Marine Messe Fukuoka, Fukuoka; Referees: Georgios Stavridis (GRE), Raffaele Colombo (ITA)
25 July 2023; 19:30	Report	Score by quarters: 1–2, 1–2, 2–1, 3–1			Marine Messe Fukuoka, Fukuoka; Referees: Georgios Stavridis (GRE), Raffaele Colombo (ITA)
25 July 2023; 19:30	Report	Tahull 2	Goals	Bouet, Crousillat 2	Marine Messe Fukuoka, Fukuoka; Referees: Georgios Stavridis (GRE), Raffaele Colombo (ITA)

=== 13–16th place semifinals ===
23 July 2023; 09:00	Report	Kazakhstan	12–5	China	Marine Messe Fukuoka, Fukuoka; Referees: Chisato Kurosaki (JPN), Vojin Putniković (SRB)
23 July 2023; 09:00	Report	Score by quarters: 1–1, 4–0, 3–1, 4–3			Marine Messe Fukuoka, Fukuoka; Referees: Chisato Kurosaki (JPN), Vojin Putniković (SRB)
23 July 2023; 09:00	Report	Markovich 4	Goals	Xie Z. 3	Marine Messe Fukuoka, Fukuoka; Referees: Chisato Kurosaki (JPN), Vojin Putniković (SRB)

23 July 2023; 10:30	Report	Argentina	15–6	South Africa	Marine Messe Fukuoka, Fukuoka; Referees: Nóra Debreceni (HUN), David Couper (NZL)
23 July 2023; 10:30	Report	Score by quarters: 3–0, 4–2, 5–1, 3–3			Marine Messe Fukuoka, Fukuoka; Referees: Nóra Debreceni (HUN), David Couper (NZL)
23 July 2023; 10:30	Report	Camnasio 4	Goals	Wheeler 2	Marine Messe Fukuoka, Fukuoka; Referees: Nóra Debreceni (HUN), David Couper (NZL)

=== 9–12th place semifinals ===
25 July 2023; 12:00	Report	Canada	5–13	Croatia	Marine Messe Fukuoka, Fukuoka; Referees: Veselin Mišković (MNE), Zhang Liang (CHN)
25 July 2023; 12:00	Report	Score by quarters: 2–3, 1–3, 1–5, 1–2			Marine Messe Fukuoka, Fukuoka; Referees: Veselin Mišković (MNE), Zhang Liang (CHN)
25 July 2023; 12:00	Report	five players 1	Goals	Butić, Lazić 3	Marine Messe Fukuoka, Fukuoka; Referees: Veselin Mišković (MNE), Zhang Liang (CHN)

25 July 2023; 13:30	Report	Australia	16–15	Japan	Marine Messe Fukuoka, Fukuoka; Referees: David Gómez (ESP), Darren Spiritsanto (USA)
25 July 2023; 13:30	Report	Score by quarters: 5–3, 4–7, 4–3, 3–2			Marine Messe Fukuoka, Fukuoka; Referees: David Gómez (ESP), Darren Spiritsanto (USA)
25 July 2023; 13:30	Report	Pavillard 4	Goals	Adachi, Takata 4	Marine Messe Fukuoka, Fukuoka; Referees: David Gómez (ESP), Darren Spiritsanto (USA)

=== 5–8th place semifinals ===
27 July 2023; 14:00	Report	Montenegro	6–10	Italy	Marine Messe Fukuoka, Fukuoka; Referees: Adrian-Tiberiu Alexandrescu (ROU), Tamás Kovács-Csatlós (HUN)
27 July 2023; 14:00	Report	Score by quarters: 1–1, 1–3, 2–3, 2–3			Marine Messe Fukuoka, Fukuoka; Referees: Adrian-Tiberiu Alexandrescu (ROU), Tamás Kovács-Csatlós (HUN)
27 July 2023; 14:00	Report	Perković 3	Goals	Damonte 3	Marine Messe Fukuoka, Fukuoka; Referees: Adrian-Tiberiu Alexandrescu (ROU), Tamás Kovács-Csatlós (HUN)

27 July 2023; 15:30	Report	United States	16–18 (PSO)	France	Marine Messe Fukuoka, Fukuoka; Referees: Michiel Zwartt (NED), David Gómez (ESP)
27 July 2023; 15:30	Report	Score by quarters: 3–1, 3–3, 5–4, 2–5 PSO: 3–5			Marine Messe Fukuoka, Fukuoka; Referees: Michiel Zwartt (NED), David Gómez (ESP)
27 July 2023; 15:30	Report	Bowen 5	Goals	Crousillat, Vernoux 3	Marine Messe Fukuoka, Fukuoka; Referees: Michiel Zwartt (NED), David Gómez (ESP)

=== Semifinals ===
27 July 2023; 17:00	Report	Greece	13–7	Serbia	Marine Messe Fukuoka, Fukuoka; Referees: Nenad Peris (CRO), Raffaele Colombo (ITA)
27 July 2023; 17:00	Report	Score by quarters: 3–2, 3–0, 3–3, 4–2			Marine Messe Fukuoka, Fukuoka; Referees: Nenad Peris (CRO), Raffaele Colombo (ITA)
27 July 2023; 17:00	Report	Argyropoulos, Kakaris 3	Goals	Jakšić, Rašović 2	Marine Messe Fukuoka, Fukuoka; Referees: Nenad Peris (CRO), Raffaele Colombo (ITA)

27 July 2023; 18:30	Report	Hungary	12–11	Spain	Marine Messe Fukuoka, Fukuoka; Referees: Boris Margeta (SLO), Frank Ohme (GER)
27 July 2023; 18:30	Report	Score by quarters: 3–3, 1–3, 3–2, 5–3			Marine Messe Fukuoka, Fukuoka; Referees: Boris Margeta (SLO), Frank Ohme (GER)
27 July 2023; 18:30	Report	Manhercz 3	Goals	three players 2	Marine Messe Fukuoka, Fukuoka; Referees: Boris Margeta (SLO), Frank Ohme (GER)

=== 15th place game ===
25 July 2023; 09:00	Report	China	16–8	South Africa	Marine Messe Fukuoka, Fukuoka; Referees: Germán Moller (ARG), Hélène Painchaud (CAN)
25 July 2023; 09:00	Report	Score by quarters: 3–2, 4–2, 4–1, 5–3			Marine Messe Fukuoka, Fukuoka; Referees: Germán Moller (ARG), Hélène Painchaud (CAN)
25 July 2023; 09:00	Report	Chen Z. 7	Goals	Badenhorst, Howard 2	Marine Messe Fukuoka, Fukuoka; Referees: Germán Moller (ARG), Hélène Painchaud (CAN)

=== 13th place game ===
25 July 2023; 10:30	Report	Kazakhstan	7–11	Argentina	Marine Messe Fukuoka, Fukuoka; Referees: Marta Cabanas (ESP), Lee-Anne Stewart (RSA)
25 July 2023; 10:30	Report	Score by quarters: 1–5, 1–1, 3–3, 2–2			Marine Messe Fukuoka, Fukuoka; Referees: Marta Cabanas (ESP), Lee-Anne Stewart (RSA)
25 July 2023; 10:30	Report	Markovich, Vuksanovich 2	Goals	Corsi 4	Marine Messe Fukuoka, Fukuoka; Referees: Marta Cabanas (ESP), Lee-Anne Stewart (RSA)

=== Eleventh place game ===
27 July 2023; 09:00	Report	Canada	11–23	Japan	Marine Messe Fukuoka, Fukuoka; Referees: Vojin Putniković (SRB), Darren Spiritosanto (USA)
27 July 2023; 09:00	Report	Score by quarters: 3–6, 3–6, 2–8, 3–3			Marine Messe Fukuoka, Fukuoka; Referees: Vojin Putniković (SRB), Darren Spiritosanto (USA)
27 July 2023; 09:00	Report	Djerkovic 3	Goals	Inaba 5	Marine Messe Fukuoka, Fukuoka; Referees: Vojin Putniković (SRB), Darren Spiritosanto (USA)

=== Ninth place game ===
27 July 2023; 10:30	Report	Croatia	17–10	Australia	Marine Messe Fukuoka, Fukuoka; Referees: Georgios Stavridis (GRE), Veselin Mišković (MNE)
27 July 2023; 10:30	Report	Score by quarters: 3–2, 5–4, 6–2, 3–2			Marine Messe Fukuoka, Fukuoka; Referees: Georgios Stavridis (GRE), Veselin Mišković (MNE)
27 July 2023; 10:30	Report	Vukičević 5	Goals	Poot 3	Marine Messe Fukuoka, Fukuoka; Referees: Georgios Stavridis (GRE), Veselin Mišković (MNE)

=== Seventh place game ===
29 July 2023; 11:30	Report	Montenegro	15–17 (PSO)	United States	Marine Messe Fukuoka, Fukuoka; Referees: Matan Schwartz (ISR), Zhang Liang (CHN)
29 July 2023; 11:30	Report	Score by quarters: 3–3, 4–4, 3–3, 2–2 PSO: 3–5			Marine Messe Fukuoka, Fukuoka; Referees: Matan Schwartz (ISR), Zhang Liang (CHN)
29 July 2023; 11:30	Report	three players 2	Goals	Hallock 4	Marine Messe Fukuoka, Fukuoka; Referees: Matan Schwartz (ISR), Zhang Liang (CHN)

=== Fifth place game ===
29 July 2023; 16:30	Report	Italy	16–9	France	Marine Messe Fukuoka, Fukuoka; Referees: Tamás Kovács-Csatlós (HUN), Veselin Mišković (MNE)
29 July 2023; 16:30	Report	Score by quarters: 1–2, 3–2, 7–3, 5–2			Marine Messe Fukuoka, Fukuoka; Referees: Tamás Kovács-Csatlós (HUN), Veselin Mišković (MNE)
29 July 2023; 16:30	Report	Di Fulvio 5	Goals	Crousillat 3	Marine Messe Fukuoka, Fukuoka; Referees: Tamás Kovács-Csatlós (HUN), Veselin Mišković (MNE)

=== Third place game ===
29 July 2023; 13:00	Report	Serbia	6–9	Spain	Marine Messe Fukuoka, Fukuoka; Referees: Frank Ohme (GER), Raffaele Colombo (ITA)
29 July 2023; 13:00	Report	Score by quarters: 3–3, 2–3, 0–2, 1–1			Marine Messe Fukuoka, Fukuoka; Referees: Frank Ohme (GER), Raffaele Colombo (ITA)
29 July 2023; 13:00	Report	Rašović 3	Goals	Granados 3	Marine Messe Fukuoka, Fukuoka; Referees: Frank Ohme (GER), Raffaele Colombo (ITA)

=== Final ===
29 July 2023; 18:00	Report	Greece	13–14 (PSO)	Hungary	Marine Messe Fukuoka, Fukuoka; Referees: Michiel Zwartt (NED), Vojin Putniković (SRB)
29 July 2023; 18:00	Report	Score by quarters: 2–4, 2–1, 3–2, 3–3 PSO: 3–4			Marine Messe Fukuoka, Fukuoka; Referees: Michiel Zwartt (NED), Vojin Putniković (SRB)
29 July 2023; 18:00	Report	Genidounias 4	Goals	Manhercz, Zalánki 3	Marine Messe Fukuoka, Fukuoka; Referees: Michiel Zwartt (NED), Vojin Putniković (SRB)

== Final ranking ==
Rank	Team
1st place, gold medalist(s)	Hungary
2nd place, silver medalist(s)	Greece
3rd place, bronze medalist(s)	Spain
4	Serbia
5	Italy
6	France
7	United States
8	Montenegro
9	Croatia
10	Australia
11	Japan
12	Canada
13	Argentina
14	Kazakhstan
15	China
16	South Africa

Qualified for the 2024 Summer Olympics

2023 Men's Water Polo World Champions

Hungary
Fourth title

== Statistics and awards ==
=== Top goalscorers ===
Rank	Name	Goals	Shots	%
1	(Serbia) Strahinja Rašović	25	45	56
2	(United States) Hannes Daube	22	48	46
3	(Serbia) Nikola Jakšić	20	43	47
4	(Hungary) Gergő Zalánki	19	36	53
5	(Greece) Konstantinos Genidounias	18	39	46
5	(Montenegro) Đuro Radović	18	35	51
7	(Italy) Francesco Di Fulvio	17	34	50
7	(Japan) Yusuke Inaba	17	45	38
9	(France) Ugo Crousillat	16	34	47
9	(Japan) Taiyo Watanabe	16	33	48

=== Awards ===
The awards were announced on 29 July 2023.

All-star team
Goalkeeper	(Greece) Emmanouil Zerdevas
Field player	(United States) Hannes Daube
Field player	(Hungary) Krisztián Manhercz
Field player	(Greece) Alexandros Papanastasiou
Field player	(Spain) Felipe Perrone
Field player	(Serbia) Strahinja Rašović
Field player	(Hungary) Gergő Zalánki
Other awards
MVP	(Hungary) Gergő Zalánki
Best goalkeeper	(Greece) Emmanouil Zerdevas
