= Central American Championships =

Central American Championships may refer to:

- Central American Cricket Championship, an international cricket regional competition
- Central American Handball Championship
- Central American Championships in Athletics
- Central American Junior and Youth Championships in Athletics
- Centrobasket

== See also ==
- Pan American Championship
- North American Championship
- South American Championship
