= Pan American Artistic Swimming Championships =

The Swimming Union of the Americas organizes Pan American Championships for the sport of artistic swimming (formerly, synchronized swimming). These are considered the official continental championships for the Americas (comprising North America, South America, Central America and the Caribbean).

== Senior editions ==
Year	Event	Location	Ref.
2010	2010 Pan American Synchronized Swimming Championships	(Peru) Lima	
2011	2011 Pan American Synchronized Swimming Championships	(Canada) Montreal	
2012	2012 Pan American Synchronized Swimming Championships	(Colombia) Cali	
2013	2013 Pan American Synchronized Swimming Championships	(Puerto Rico) San Juan	
2014	2014 Pan American Synchronized Swimming Championships	(United States) Riverside, California	
2015	2015 Pan American Synchronized Swimming Championships	(Canada) Calgary	
2016	2016 Pan American Synchronized Swimming Championships	(Puerto Rico) San Juan	
2017	2017 Pan American Synchronized Swimming Championships	(Chile) Santiago	
2018	2018 Pan American Artistic Swimming Championships	(United States) Riverside, California	
2019	2019 Pan American Artistic Swimming Championships	(Canada) Windsor	

== All-time medal table ==
2010–2019; Senior and combined events
Rank	Nation	Gold	Silver	Bronze	Total
1	Mexico (MEX)	14	14	4	32
2	United States (USA)	10	3	2	15
3	Canada (CAN)	7	7	6	20
4	Argentina (ARG)	7	0	7	14
5	Brazil (BRA)	5	4	2	11
6	Chile (CHI)	4	2	3	9
7	Colombia (COL)	4	1	4	9
8	Aruba (ARU)	2	0	1	3
9	Puerto Rico (PUR)	1	4	2	7
10	Peru (PER)	0	5	2	7
11	Costa Rica (CRC)	0	3	3	6
12	Uruguay (URU)	0	2	2	4
13	Panama (PAN)	0	1	1	2
14	Venezuela (VEN)	0	1	0	1
15	Guatemala (GUA)	0	0	2	2
Totals (15 entries)		54	47	41	142

== See also ==
- Artistic swimming at the Pan American Games
