= Megan Sileno =

South African water polo player

Personal information
- Nationality: South African
- Born: May 1, 1989 (age 37) Cape Town, South Africa

Sport
- Sport: Water polo

Megan Sileno (born May 1, 1989) is a South African water polo player, and coach. She is a member of the South Africa women's national water polo team. She was part of the team in the women's water polo tournament at the 2020 Summer Olympics.

She coaches at St. Anne's Diocesan College.
