= Chloe Meecham =

South African water polo player

Personal information
- Nationality: South Africa
- Born: Chloe Meecham; 16 February 1999 (age 27) East London, South Africa

Sport
- Sport: Water polo

Chloe Meecham (born 16 February 1999) is a South African water polo player.

She was a member of the South Africa women's national water polo team at the 2020 Tokyo Summer Olympics, where they ranked 10th.
