= Cameron Laurenson =

South African water polo player

Personal information
- Full name: Cameron Bain Laurenson
- Nationality: South African
- Born: 28 April 1998 (age 26)

Sport
- Country: South Africa
- Sport: Water polo

Cameron Bain Laurenson (born 28 April 1998) is a South African water polo player. He competed in the 2020 Summer Olympics, held July–August 2021 in Tokyo.
