= Ignardus Badenhorst =

South African water polo player

Personal information
- Nationality: South Africa
- Born: 26 August 1990 (age 34); Pretoria, South Africa

Sport
- Sport: Water polo

Ignardus Badenhorst (born 26 August 1990) is a South African water polo player. He competed in the 2020 Summer Olympics.
