= Argentina women's national water polo team =

Women's national water polo team representing Germany

Argentina
- FINA code: ARG
- Association: Confederación Argentina de Deportes Acuáticos
- Confederation: UANA (Americas)
- Head coach: Guillermo Setti; Fabio Lombardo
- Captain: Maria Canda

FINA ranking (since 2008)
- Current: 24 (as of 9 August 2021)

World Championship
- Appearances: 3 (first in 2022)
- Best result: 12th place (2022)

Media
- Website: cadda.org.ar

The Argentina women's national water polo team represents Argentina in international women's water polo competitions and friendly matches.

== Results ==
=== World Championship ===
- 2022 – 12th place
- 2023 – 16th place
- 2025 – 14th place

== Current squad ==
Roster for the 2025 World Championships.

Head coach: Guillermo Setti
Fabio Lombardo

- 1 Nahir Stegmayer GK
- 2 Maitena Romano FP
- 3 Bianca Perasso FP
- 4 Isabella Mastronardi FP
- 5 Manuela Tamagnone Werbach FP
- 6 Maylen Sampedro FP
- 7 Julieta Auliel FP
- 8 Carla Comba FP
- 9 María Canda FP
- 10 Ana Agnesina FP
- 11 Anahi Bacigalupo FP
- 12 Isabel Riley FP
- 13 Lola Canales GK
- 14 Agustina Todoroff FP
