= 2022 Asian Water Polo Championship =

International water polo competition

- Host city: Samut Prakan, Thailand
- Dates: 7–14 November 2022
- Main venue: Assumption University Aquatic Center

The 2022 Asian Water Polo Championship was held from 7–14 November 2022 in Bang Sao Thong district, Samut Prakan province, Thailand. It was the Asian continental qualification for the 2023 World Aquatics Championships.

== Men's tournament ==
=== Preliminary round ===
==== Group A ====
Pos	Team	Pld	W	D	L	GF	GA	GD	Pts
1	Iran	4	4	0	0	62	25	+37	8
2	Kazakhstan	4	3	0	1	48	24	+24	6
3	South Korea	4	2	0	2	45	35	+10	4
4	Thailand	4	0	1	3	27	57	−30	1
5	India	4	0	1	3	22	63	−41	1

Source: Thailand Swimming

7 November; 14:00	India	3–16	South Korea	Assumption University Aquatic Center, Samut Prakan
7 November; 14:00	Score by quarters: 1–4, 0–3, 1–4, 1–5			Assumption University Aquatic Center, Samut Prakan

7 November; 18:00	Kazakhstan	15–4	Thailand	Assumption University Aquatic Center, Samut Prakan
7 November; 18:00	Score by quarters: 4–1, 3–1, 4–1, 4–1			Assumption University Aquatic Center, Samut Prakan

8 November; 16:40	India	4–19	Iran	Assumption University Aquatic Center, Samut Prakan
8 November; 16:40	Score by quarters: 2–5, 1–3, 0–6, 1–5			Assumption University Aquatic Center, Samut Prakan

8 November; 18:00	South Korea	16–9	Thailand	Assumption University Aquatic Center, Samut Prakan
8 November; 18:00	Score by quarters: 3–2, 2–2, 4–1, 7–4			Assumption University Aquatic Center, Samut Prakan

9 November; 14:00	Iran	17–8	South Korea	Assumption University Aquatic Center, Samut Prakan
9 November; 14:00	Score by quarters: 5–1, 1–2, 5–3, 6–2			Assumption University Aquatic Center, Samut Prakan

9 November; 15:20	Kazakhstan	17–4	India	Assumption University Aquatic Center, Samut Prakan
9 November; 15:20	Score by quarters: 2–2, 7–1, 2–0, 6–1			Assumption University Aquatic Center, Samut Prakan

10 November; 16:40	Iran	11–10	Kazakhstan	Assumption University Aquatic Center, Samut Prakan
10 November; 16:40	Score by quarters: 2–4, 2–1, 3–3, 4–2			Assumption University Aquatic Center, Samut Prakan

10 November; 18:00	India	11–11	Thailand	Assumption University Aquatic Center, Samut Prakan
10 November; 18:00	Score by quarters: 2–3, 3–4, 4–0, 2–4			Assumption University Aquatic Center, Samut Prakan

11 November; 14:00	Kazakhstan	6–5	South Korea	Assumption University Aquatic Center, Samut Prakan
11 November; 14:00	Score by quarters: 1–1, 2–1, 2–2, 1–1			Assumption University Aquatic Center, Samut Prakan

11 November; 18:00	Thailand	3–15	Iran	Assumption University Aquatic Center, Samut Prakan
11 November; 18:00	Score by quarters: 0–3, 2–6, 1–3, 0–3			Assumption University Aquatic Center, Samut Prakan

==== Group B ====
Pos	Team	Pld	W	D	L	GF	GA	GD	Pts
1	Japan	4	4	0	0	79	23	+56	8
2	China	4	3	0	1	82	24	+58	6
3	Singapore	4	2	0	2	48	66	−18	4
4	Hong Kong	4	1	0	3	25	75	−50	2
5	Kuwait	4	0	0	4	27	73	−46	0

Source: Thailand Swimming

7 November; 15:20	Singapore	17–8	Kuwait	Assumption University Aquatic Center, Samut Prakan
7 November; 15:20	Score by quarters: 4–1, 3–1, 7–3, 3–3			Assumption University Aquatic Center, Samut Prakan

7 November; 16:40	China	26–2	Hong Kong	Assumption University Aquatic Center, Samut Prakan
7 November; 16:40	Score by quarters: 6–0, 5–0, 8–0, 7–2			Assumption University Aquatic Center, Samut Prakan

8 November; 14:00	Hong Kong	11–19	Singapore	Assumption University Aquatic Center, Samut Prakan
8 November; 14:00	Score by quarters: 3–3, 3–6, 3–6, 2–4			Assumption University Aquatic Center, Samut Prakan

8 November; 15:20	Japan	14–9	China	Assumption University Aquatic Center, Samut Prakan
8 November; 15:20	Score by quarters: 4–1, 5–2, 3–4, 2–2			Assumption University Aquatic Center, Samut Prakan

9 November; 16:40	Kuwait	10–11	Hong Kong	Assumption University Aquatic Center, Samut Prakan
9 November; 16:40	Score by quarters: 3–5, 4–2, 0–2, 3–2			Assumption University Aquatic Center, Samut Prakan

9 November; 18:00	Singapore	6–22	Japan	Assumption University Aquatic Center, Samut Prakan
9 November; 18:00	Score by quarters: 0–11, 1–4, 2–6, 3–1			Assumption University Aquatic Center, Samut Prakan

10 November; 14:00	Japan	23–7	Kuwait	Assumption University Aquatic Center, Samut Prakan
10 November; 14:00	Score by quarters: 6–0, 7–1, 5–2, 5–4			Assumption University Aquatic Center, Samut Prakan

10 November; 15:20	China	25–6	Singapore	Assumption University Aquatic Center, Samut Prakan
10 November; 15:20	Score by quarters: 6–0, 7–1, 4–3, 8–2			Assumption University Aquatic Center, Samut Prakan

11 November; 15:20	Japan	20–1	Hong Kong	Assumption University Aquatic Center, Samut Prakan
11 November; 15:20	Score by quarters: 7–0, 5–1, 5–0, 3–0			Assumption University Aquatic Center, Samut Prakan

11 November; 16:40	Kuwait	2–22	China	Assumption University Aquatic Center, Samut Prakan
11 November; 16:40	Score by quarters: 1–7, 1–4, 0–5, 0–6			Assumption University Aquatic Center, Samut Prakan

=== 9th place match ===
12 November; 13:20	Kuwait	9–13	India	Assumption University Aquatic Center, Samut Prakan
12 November; 13:20	Score by quarters: 0–3, 2–2, 5–4, 2–4			Assumption University Aquatic Center, Samut Prakan

=== Final round ===
Quarterfinals
12 November
Iran	19
Hong Kong	2
12 November
South Korea	8
China	18
12 November
Kazakhstan	18
Singapore	8
12 November
Thailand	5
Japan	33

Semifinals
13 November
Iran	10
China	11
13 November
Kazakhstan	4
Japan	20

Final
14 November
China	7
Japan	10
Bronze medal match
14 November
Iran	5
Kazakhstan	8

Classification 5th–8th
13 November
Hong Kong	3
South Korea	13
13 November
Singapore	12
Thailand	9

5th place match
14 November
South Korea	14
Singapore	7
7th place match
14 November
Hong Kong	7
Thailand	12

==== Quarterfinals ====
12 November; 14:40	Iran	19–2	Hong Kong	Assumption University Aquatic Center, Samut Prakan
12 November; 14:40	Score by quarters: 9–0, 4–1, 1–0, 5–1			Assumption University Aquatic Center, Samut Prakan

12 November; 16:00	Kazakhstan	18–8	Singapore	Assumption University Aquatic Center, Samut Prakan
12 November; 16:00	Score by quarters: 5–3, 5–1, 4–2, 4–2			Assumption University Aquatic Center, Samut Prakan

12 November; 17:20	South Korea	8–18	China	Assumption University Aquatic Center, Samut Prakan
12 November; 17:20	Score by quarters: 3–4, 2–5, 2–5, 1–4			Assumption University Aquatic Center, Samut Prakan

12 November; 18:50	Thailand	5–33	Japan	Assumption University Aquatic Center, Samut Prakan
12 November; 18:50	Score by quarters: 1–8, 2–7, 0–11, 2–7			Assumption University Aquatic Center, Samut Prakan

==== Classification 5th–8th ====
13 November; 15:50	Singapore	12–9	Thailand	Assumption University Aquatic Center, Samut Prakan
13 November; 15:50	Score by quarters: 2–0, 5–5, 4–2, 1–2			Assumption University Aquatic Center, Samut Prakan

13 November; 17:10	Hong Kong	3–13	South Korea	Assumption University Aquatic Center, Samut Prakan
13 November; 17:10	Score by quarters: 0–4, 0–1, 1–3, 2–5			Assumption University Aquatic Center, Samut Prakan

==== Semifinals ====
13 November; 14:30	Iran	10–11	China	Assumption University Aquatic Center, Samut Prakan
13 November; 14:30	Score by quarters: 3–3, 3–1, 2–5, 2–2			Assumption University Aquatic Center, Samut Prakan

13 November; 18:30	Kazakhstan	4–20	Japan	Assumption University Aquatic Center, Samut Prakan
13 November; 18:30	Score by quarters: 1–6, 1–3, 1–6, 1–5			Assumption University Aquatic Center, Samut Prakan

==== 7th place match ====
14 November; 13:00	Hong Kong	7–12	Thailand	Assumption University Aquatic Center, Samut Prakan
14 November; 13:00	Score by quarters: 0–1, 4–3, 3–3, 0–5			Assumption University Aquatic Center, Samut Prakan

==== 5th place match ====
14 November; 14:20	South Korea	14–7	Singapore	Assumption University Aquatic Center, Samut Prakan
14 November; 14:20	Score by quarters: 4–3, 5–0, 0–1, 5–3			Assumption University Aquatic Center, Samut Prakan

==== Bronze medal match ====
14 November; 15:40	Iran	5–8	Kazakhstan	Assumption University Aquatic Center, Samut Prakan
14 November; 15:40	Score by quarters: 1–1, 1–1, 3–4, 0–2			Assumption University Aquatic Center, Samut Prakan

==== Final ====
14 November; 17:00	China	7–10	Japan	Assumption University Aquatic Center, Samut Prakan
14 November; 17:00	Score by quarters: 3–3, 1–5, 2–2, 1–0			Assumption University Aquatic Center, Samut Prakan

== Women's tournament ==
=== Preliminary round ===
Pos	Team	Pld	W	D	L	GF	GA	GD	Pts
1	China	5	5	0	0	126	27	+99	10
2	Japan	5	4	0	1	133	39	+94	8
3	Kazakhstan	5	3	0	2	76	58	+18	6
4	Thailand	5	2	0	3	57	78	−21	4
5	Singapore	5	1	0	4	51	96	−45	2
6	South Korea	5	0	0	5	19	164	−145	0

Source: Thailand Swimming

8 November; 9:00	China	32–3	Singapore	Assumption University Aquatic Center, Samut Prakan
8 November; 9:00	Score by quarters: 7–0, 9–0, 5–2, 11–1			Assumption University Aquatic Center, Samut Prakan

8 November; 10:20	Kazakhstan	25–5	South Korea	Assumption University Aquatic Center, Samut Prakan
8 November; 10:20	Score by quarters: 7–0, 8–1, 7–3, 3–1			Assumption University Aquatic Center, Samut Prakan

8 November; 11:40	Japan	28–4	Thailand	Assumption University Aquatic Center, Samut Prakan
8 November; 11:40	Score by quarters: 5–2, 9–1, 6–1, 8–0			Assumption University Aquatic Center, Samut Prakan

9 November; 9:00	South Korea	3–40	Japan	Assumption University Aquatic Center, Samut Prakan
9 November; 9:00	Score by quarters: 0–15, 2–9, 0–9, 1–7			Assumption University Aquatic Center, Samut Prakan

9 November; 10:20	China	16–5	Kazakhstan	Assumption University Aquatic Center, Samut Prakan
9 November; 10:20	Score by quarters: 3–2, 2–1, 5–1, 6–1			Assumption University Aquatic Center, Samut Prakan

9 November; 11:40	Singapore	9–13	Thailand	Assumption University Aquatic Center, Samut Prakan
9 November; 11:40	Score by quarters: 2–4, 3–3, 2–4, 2–2			Assumption University Aquatic Center, Samut Prakan

10 November; 9:00	Kazakhstan	18–9	Singapore	Assumption University Aquatic Center, Samut Prakan
10 November; 9:00	Score by quarters: 6–3, 3–4, 5–2, 4–0			Assumption University Aquatic Center, Samut Prakan

10 November; 10:20	Japan	15–16	China	Assumption University Aquatic Center, Samut Prakan
10 November; 10:20	Score by quarters: 3–7, 4–4, 5–3, 3–2			Assumption University Aquatic Center, Samut Prakan

10 November; 11:40	Thailand	32–4	South Korea	Assumption University Aquatic Center, Samut Prakan
10 November; 11:40	Score by quarters: 8–1, 9–0, 8–1, 7–2			Assumption University Aquatic Center, Samut Prakan

11 November; 9:00	China	22–3	Thailand	Assumption University Aquatic Center, Samut Prakan
11 November; 9:00	Score by quarters: 6–0, 6–1, 4–1, 6–1			Assumption University Aquatic Center, Samut Prakan

11 November; 10:20	Singapore	27–6	South Korea	Assumption University Aquatic Center, Samut Prakan
11 November; 10:20	Score by quarters: 6–3, 6–1, 6–1, 9–1			Assumption University Aquatic Center, Samut Prakan

11 November; 11:40	Kazakhstan	13–23	Japan	Assumption University Aquatic Center, Samut Prakan
11 November; 11:40	Score by quarters: 3–7, 5–5, 3–5, 2–6			Assumption University Aquatic Center, Samut Prakan

12 November; 9:00	Japan	27–3	Singapore	Assumption University Aquatic Center, Samut Prakan
12 November; 9:00	Score by quarters: 9–1, 6–0, 7–1, 5–1			Assumption University Aquatic Center, Samut Prakan

12 November; 10:20	South Korea	1–40	China	Assumption University Aquatic Center, Samut Prakan
12 November; 10:20	Score by quarters: 0–10, 0–14, 1–9, 0–7			Assumption University Aquatic Center, Samut Prakan

12 November; 11:40	Thailand	6–15	Kazakhstan	Assumption University Aquatic Center, Samut Prakan
12 November; 11:40	Score by quarters: 2–4, 1–4, 0–1, 3–6			Assumption University Aquatic Center, Samut Prakan

=== 5th place match ===
14 November; 8:30	Singapore	18–4	South Korea	Assumption University Aquatic Center, Samut Prakan
14 November; 8:30	Score by quarters: 3–1, 4–1, 6–0, 5–2			Assumption University Aquatic Center, Samut Prakan

=== Final round ===
Semifinals
13 November
Japan	16
Kazakhstan	12
13 November
China	27
Thailand	2

Final
14 November
Japan	5
China	17
Bronze medal match
14 November
Kazakhstan	14
Thailand	5

==== Semifinals ====
13 November; 11:00	Japan	16–12	Kazakhstan	Assumption University Aquatic Center, Samut Prakan
13 November; 11:00	Score by quarters: 5–3, 3–1, 5–4, 3–4			Assumption University Aquatic Center, Samut Prakan

13 November; 12:20	China	27–2	Thailand	Assumption University Aquatic Center, Samut Prakan
13 November; 12:20	Score by quarters: 6–0, 4–0, 7–1, 10–1			Assumption University Aquatic Center, Samut Prakan

==== Bronze medal match ====
14 November; 9:50	Kazakhstan	14–5	Thailand	Assumption University Aquatic Center, Samut Prakan
14 November; 9:50	Score by quarters: 4–0, 5–1, 2–4, 3–0			Assumption University Aquatic Center, Samut Prakan

==== Final ====
14 November; 11:10	Japan	5–17	China	Assumption University Aquatic Center, Samut Prakan
14 November; 11:10	Score by quarters: 1–2, 1–6, 1–5, 2–4			Assumption University Aquatic Center, Samut Prakan

== See also ==
- Water polo at the 2023 World Aquatics Championships – Men's tournament
- Water polo at the 2023 World Aquatics Championships – Women's tournament
