= PanAm Aquatics =

Swimming association for the Americas

- Sport: Aquatic Sports
- Membership: 52 federations
- Founded: 1927; 99 years ago
- Affiliation: World Aquatics

Official website
- panamaquatics.com

PanAm Aquatics or PAQ, (formerly Spanish: Unión Americana de Natación, English: Swimming Union of the Americas, popularly known by its acronym UANA or ASUA) is the swimming continental association for the Americas (i.e. it oversees international aquatics competition within North and South America).

ASUA was founded during the 1948 Olympics in London, United Kingdom.

== Organization ==
ASUA is divided into five zones, each responsible for organizing competitions through its own governing body, with Zones 2 and 3 sharing a single organization.

The bodies that oversees these Zones, are:

- Zone 1: CONSANAT—the South American Swimming Confederation (Confederación Sudamericana de Natación).
- Zone 2 and 3: Each zone consists of members of the CCCAN—the Central American and Caribbean Swimming Confederation (Confederación Centroamericana y del Caribe de Natación).
- Zone 4: United States Aquatic Sports (USAS)
- Zone 5: Aquatic Federation of Canada

Member countries (with FINA abbreviations), by zone:

| Zone | Confederation | Countries |
|---|---|---|
| 1 | CONSANAT (12) | Argentina; Bolivia; Brazil; Colombia / Chile; Ecuador; Guyana; Paraguay / Peru; Suriname; Uruguay; Venezuela |
| 2 | CCCAN (21) | Anguilla; Antigua and Barbuda; Aruba; Bahamas; Barbados; Belize; Bermuda; British Virgin Islands; Cayman Islands; Curacao; Dominica Grenada; Haiti; Jamaica; St. Kitts and Nevis; Saint Lucia; Saint Vincent and the Grenadines; Sint Maarten; Trinidad and Tobago; Turks and Caicos Islands; US Virgin Islands |
| 3 | CCCAN (10) | Costa Rica; Cuba; Dominican Republic; El Salvador / Guatemala; Honduras; Mexico / Nicaragua; Panama; Puerto Rico |
| 4 | USAS (1) | USA |
| 5 | AFC (1) | Canada |

== Competitions ==
- Pan American Aquatics Championships
- Artistic Swimming: Pan American Artistic Swimming Championships
- Water Polo: Pan American Water Polo Championships
- Swimming: UANA Swimming Cup (defunct)

== See also ==
- World Aquatics
