= Fukuoka Convention Center =

Convention center complex in Fukuoka, Japan

Coordinates: 33.603998°N 130.403857°E

Fukuoka Convention Center (福岡国際会議場, Fukuoka kokusai kaigijou) in Hakata-ku, Fukuoka, Japan is a collection of three separate buildings operated by the Fukuoka Convention Center Foundation.

== Fukuoka Kokusai Center ==
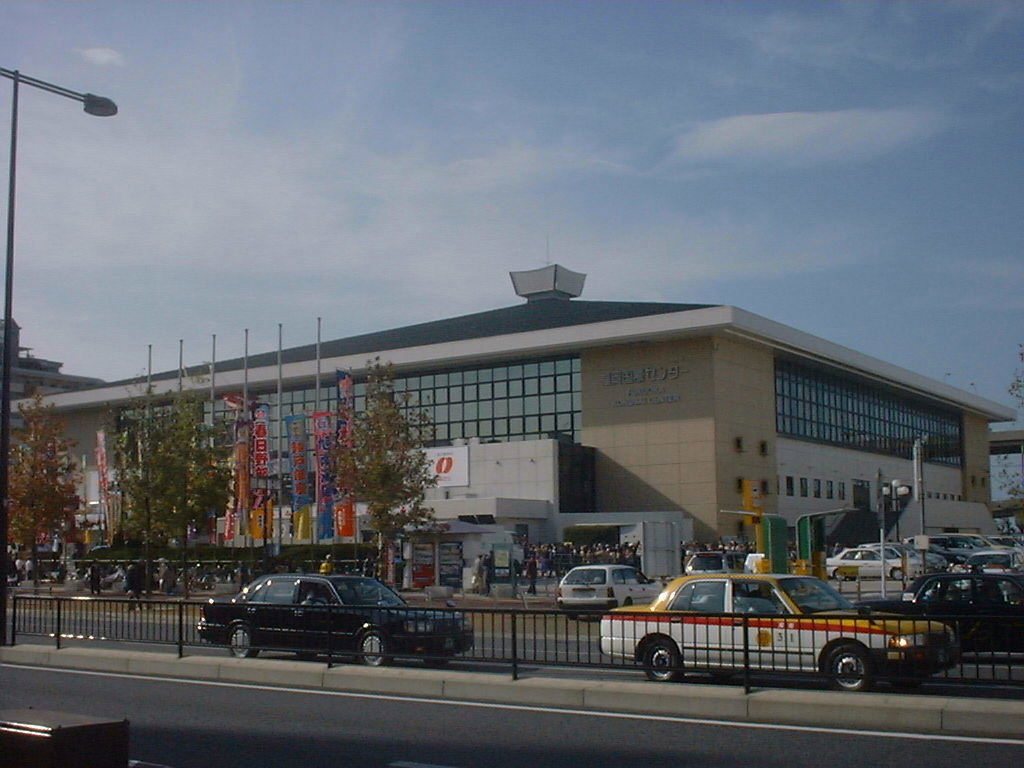
Fukuoka Kokusai Center, Nov. 2005 honbasho

The Fukuoka Kokusai Center opened in 1981 (45 years ago). A Sumo tournament is held here every November.

== Marine Messe Fukuoka ==
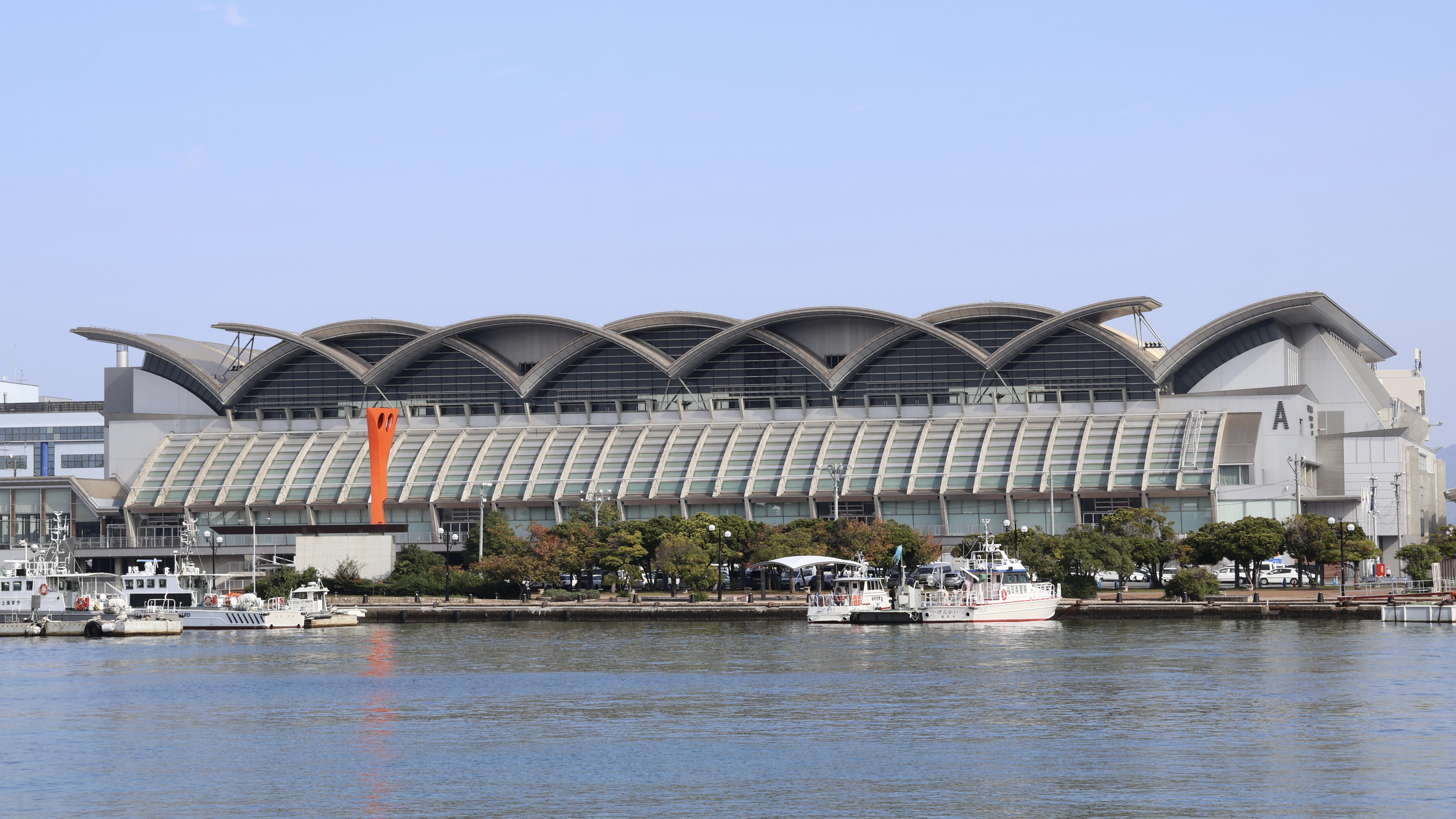
Marine Messe Fukuoka

Marine Messe Fukuoka opened in 1995 (31 years ago) for the 1995 Summer Universiade. One of its main uses is as an indoor sporting arena. The capacity of the arena is up to 15,000 people for sports events and up to 13,000 people for concerts. It hosted the 1999 Asian Basketball Championship, the 2001 World Aquatics Championships and the preliminary rounds during the 2006 Volleyball World Championship

Japanese musicians Misia, Koda Kumi, and Ayumi Hamasaki commonly play here for arena tours.

== Fukuoka International Congress Center ==
The Fukuoka International Congress Center opened in 2003 (23 years ago).

== Events ==
=== Past events ===
- 1997 - Celine Dion - Falling into You: Around the World
- 1999 - 1999 Asian Basketball Championship
- 2001 - 2001 World Aquatics Championships
- 2003 - Mariah Carey - Charmbracelet World Tour
- 2004 - BoA - Live Tour 2004: Love & Honesty
- 2005 - BoA - Arena Tour 2005: Best Of Soul
- 2006 - International Political Science Association world congresses
- 2011 - Girls' Generation - The First Japan Arena Tour (Girls' Generation)
- 2012 - BIGBANG - Alive Galaxy Tour
- 2013 - 2pm - Japan Arena Tour 2013: Legend of 2PM
- 2013 - Girls' Generation - Girls & Peace: 2nd Japan Tour
- 2014 - Girls' Generation Japan 3rd Tour
- 2015 - Exo Planet #2 – The Exo'luxion
- 2016 - Exo Planet #3 – The Exo'rdium
- 2016 - iKON Japan Tour 2016-2017
- 2017 - Exo Planet #4 – The EℓyXiOn
- 2017 - iKON Japan Dome Tour 2017
- 2017 - BTS Live Trilogy Episode III: The Wings Tour
- 2018 - Blackpink Arena Tour 2018
- 2018 - Aqours 3rd LoveLive! Tour ～WONDERFUL STORIES～
- 2019 - Red Velvet 2nd Concert "Redmare"
- 2019 - Seventeen - Seventeen 2019 Japan Tour 'HARU'
- 2019 - Iz*One - IZ*ONE 1st Concert "Eyes On Me"
- 2020 - NCT 127 - NCT 127 1st Tour 'NEO CITY – The Origin'
- 2020 - Twice - Twice World Tour "Twicelights"
- 2022 - NCT Dream - NCT Dream Tour "The Dream Show 2: In A Dream"
- 2022 - Treasure – Treasure Japan Arena Tour 2022–2023 "Hello"
- 2023 - 2023 World Aquatics Championships
- 2025 - Babymonster - Hello Monsters World Tour
- 2026 - Babymonster - Choom World Tour
- 2026 - Le Sserafim - Pureflow Tour
