= 2016 Men's European Water Polo Championship =

- Official logo

Tournament details
- Country: Serbia
- City: Belgrade
- Venue: Belgrade Arena (in 1 host city)
- Dates: 10 January 2016– 23 January 2016
- Teams: 16 (from 1 confederation)

Final positions
- Champions: Serbia (7th title)
- Runners-up: Montenegro
- Third place: Hungary
- Fourth place: Greece

Tournament statistics
- Matches played: 56
- Goals scored: 1,076 (19.21 per match)
- Top scorer: (Malta) Stevie Camilleri (21 goals)

Awards
- Best player: (Serbia) Andrija Prlainović
- Best goalkeeper: (Hungary) Viktor Nagy

Official website
- belgrade2016.rs (archived)

The 2016 Men's European Water Polo Championship was held in Belgrade, Serbia.

Serbia won their seventh, and third straight, title by defeating the Montenegro 10–8 in the final. Hungary captured the bronze medal after a 13–10 win over Greece.

== Qualification ==
For the first time, the tournament will be contested by 16 countries (12 previously). The 16 teams qualified as follows:

- The host nation
- The best seven teams from the 2014 European Championships not already qualified as the host nation
- eight qualifiers

Event	Date	Location	Vacancies	Qualified
Host nation	–	–	1	Serbia
2014 European Championships	14–27 July 2014	(Hungary) Budapest	7	Hungary; Italy; Montenegro; Croatia; Greece; Spain; Romania
Qualifiers		–	8	Netherlands; Georgia; France; Slovakia; Germany; Malta; Russia; Turkey

== Format ==
The 16 teams were split into four groups of four teams. All teams advance to the knockout stage, from which on a knockout-system will be used to determine the final positions.

== Draw ==
The draw was held on 4 October 2015.

Pot 1	Pot 2	Pot 3	Pot 4
Serbia; Italy; Montenegro; Hungary	Croatia; Spain; Greece; Romania	Netherlands; France; Russia; Germany	Georgia; Malta; Turkey; Slovakia

== Preliminary round ==
All times are local (UTC+1).

=== Group A ===
Pos	Team	Pld	W	D	L	GF	GA	GD	Pts
1	Spain	3	2	1	0	36	16	+20	7
2	Montenegro	3	2	1	0	36	20	+16	7
3	Netherlands	3	1	0	2	16	33	−17	3
4	Slovakia	3	0	0	3	15	34	−19	0

Source: wpbelgrade2016.com
Rules for classification: 1) points; 2) head-to-head points; 3) head-to-head goal difference; 4) head-to-head number of goals scored; 5) goal difference.

10 January 2016; 09:30	Report	Spain	13–4	Slovakia	Kombank Arena, Belgrade; Referees: Alessandro Severo (ITA), Frank Ohme (GER)
10 January 2016; 09:30	Report	Score by quarters: 4–0, 6–2, 2–1, 1–1			Kombank Arena, Belgrade; Referees: Alessandro Severo (ITA), Frank Ohme (GER)
10 January 2016; 09:30	Report	Molina 4	Goals	Faměra 2	Kombank Arena, Belgrade; Referees: Alessandro Severo (ITA), Frank Ohme (GER)

10 January 2016; 18:15	Report	Montenegro	13–6	Netherlands	Kombank Arena, Belgrade; Referees: Matan Schwartz (ISR), György Kun (HUN)
10 January 2016; 18:15	Report	Score by quarters: 5–0, 3–1, 3–2, 2–3			Kombank Arena, Belgrade; Referees: Matan Schwartz (ISR), György Kun (HUN)
10 January 2016; 18:15	Report	Radović 4	Goals	Lindhout 2	Kombank Arena, Belgrade; Referees: Matan Schwartz (ISR), György Kun (HUN)

12 January 2016; 09:30	Report	Slovakia	5–6	Netherlands	Kombank Arena, Belgrade; Referees: Radosław Koryzna (POL), Adrian Alexandrescu (ROU)
12 January 2016; 09:30	Report	Score by quarters: 1–2, 1–2, 1–0, 2–2			Kombank Arena, Belgrade; Referees: Radosław Koryzna (POL), Adrian Alexandrescu (ROU)
12 January 2016; 09:30	Report	Seman 3	Goals	Frauenfelder 3	Kombank Arena, Belgrade; Referees: Radosław Koryzna (POL), Adrian Alexandrescu (ROU)

12 January 2016; 18:45	Report	Montenegro	8–8	Spain	Kombank Arena, Belgrade; Referees: Mark Koganov (AZE), Sergey Naumov (RUS)
12 January 2016; 18:45	Report	Score by quarters: 3–3, 1–2, 2–2, 2–1			Kombank Arena, Belgrade; Referees: Mark Koganov (AZE), Sergey Naumov (RUS)
12 January 2016; 18:45	Report	Ivović, Janović 2	Goals	Español 3	Kombank Arena, Belgrade; Referees: Mark Koganov (AZE), Sergey Naumov (RUS)

14 January 2016; 17:15	Report	Spain	15–4	Netherlands	Kombank Arena, Belgrade; Referees: Haldun Toygarlı (TUR), Luís Santos (POR)
14 January 2016; 17:15	Report	Score by quarters: 5–0, 2–1, 3–2, 5–1			Kombank Arena, Belgrade; Referees: Haldun Toygarlı (TUR), Luís Santos (POR)
14 January 2016; 17:15	Report	Español 6	Goals	Lindhout 3	Kombank Arena, Belgrade; Referees: Haldun Toygarlı (TUR), Luís Santos (POR)

14 January 2016; 18:45	Report	Montenegro	15–6	Slovakia	Kombank Arena, Belgrade; Referees: Georgios Stavridis (GRE), Frank Ohme (GER)
14 January 2016; 18:45	Report	Score by quarters: 6–3, 6–0, 1–2, 2–1			Kombank Arena, Belgrade; Referees: Georgios Stavridis (GRE), Frank Ohme (GER)
14 January 2016; 18:45	Report	Janović, Radović 4	Goals	six players 1	Kombank Arena, Belgrade; Referees: Georgios Stavridis (GRE), Frank Ohme (GER)

=== Group B ===
Pos	Team	Pld	W	D	L	GF	GA	GD	Pts
1	Serbia	3	3	0	0	49	16	+33	9
2	Croatia	3	2	0	1	48	20	+28	6
3	France	3	1	0	2	30	43	−13	3
4	Malta	3	0	0	3	11	59	−48	0

Source: wpbelgrade2016.com
Rules for classification: 1) points; 2) head-to-head points; 3) head-to-head goal difference; 4) head-to-head number of goals scored; 5) goal difference.

10 January 2016; 17:15	Report	France	17–7	Malta	Kombank Arena, Belgrade; Referees: Sergey Naumov (RUS), Georgios Stavridis (GRE)
10 January 2016; 17:15	Report	Score by quarters: 3–0, 7–4, 5–1, 2–2			Kombank Arena, Belgrade; Referees: Sergey Naumov (RUS), Georgios Stavridis (GRE)
10 January 2016; 17:15	Report	Crousillat 5	Goals	S. Camilleri 5	Kombank Arena, Belgrade; Referees: Sergey Naumov (RUS), Georgios Stavridis (GRE)

10 January 2016; 20:30	Report	Croatia	6–13	Serbia	Kombank Arena, Belgrade; Attendance: 11,000; Referees: Mark Koganov (AZE), Adrian Alexandrescu (ROU)
10 January 2016; 20:30	Report	Score by quarters: 1–3, 2–4, 1–5, 2–1			Kombank Arena, Belgrade; Attendance: 11,000; Referees: Mark Koganov (AZE), Adrian Alexandrescu (ROU)
10 January 2016; 20:30	Report	Šetka 2	Goals	Mandić, Prlainović 3	Kombank Arena, Belgrade; Attendance: 11,000; Referees: Mark Koganov (AZE), Adrian Alexandrescu (ROU)

12 January 2016; 17:15	Report	France	5–20	Croatia	Kombank Arena, Belgrade; Referees: Frank Ohme (GER), Luís Santos (POR)
12 January 2016; 17:15	Report	Score by quarters: 0–7, 1–1, 2–8, 2–4			Kombank Arena, Belgrade; Referees: Frank Ohme (GER), Luís Santos (POR)
12 January 2016; 17:15	Report	Camarasa 2	Goals	Joković 4	Kombank Arena, Belgrade; Referees: Frank Ohme (GER), Luís Santos (POR)

12 January 2016; 20:15	Report	Serbia	20–2	Malta	Kombank Arena, Belgrade; Attendance: 8,000; Referees: Haldun Toygarlı (TUR), Irakli Kikalishvili (GEO)
12 January 2016; 20:15	Report	Score by quarters: 6–0, 5–1, 4–1, 5–0			Kombank Arena, Belgrade; Attendance: 8,000; Referees: Haldun Toygarlı (TUR), Irakli Kikalishvili (GEO)
12 January 2016; 20:15	Report	Nikić 5	Goals	S. Camilleri 2	Kombank Arena, Belgrade; Attendance: 8,000; Referees: Haldun Toygarlı (TUR), Irakli Kikalishvili (GEO)

14 January 2016; 09:30	Report	Croatia	22–2	Malta	Kombank Arena, Belgrade; Referees: György Kun (HUN), Sergey Naumov (RUS)
14 January 2016; 09:30	Report	Score by quarters: 7–1, 5–1, 5–0, 5–0			Kombank Arena, Belgrade; Referees: György Kun (HUN), Sergey Naumov (RUS)
14 January 2016; 09:30	Report	Bušlje, Sukno 4	Goals	Gabarretta, Meli 1	Kombank Arena, Belgrade; Referees: György Kun (HUN), Sergey Naumov (RUS)

14 January 2016; 20:15	Report	France	8–16	Serbia	Kombank Arena, Belgrade; Attendance: 10,249; Referees: Alessandro Svero (ITA), Radosław Koryzna (POL)
14 January 2016; 20:15	Report	Score by quarters: 4–3, 2–4, 1–3, 1–6			Kombank Arena, Belgrade; Attendance: 10,249; Referees: Alessandro Svero (ITA), Radosław Koryzna (POL)
14 January 2016; 20:15	Report	Camarasa, Crousillat 2	Goals	Prlainović 3	Kombank Arena, Belgrade; Attendance: 10,249; Referees: Alessandro Svero (ITA), Radosław Koryzna (POL)

=== Group C ===
Pos	Team	Pld	W	D	L	GF	GA	GD	Pts
1	Italy	3	3	0	0	48	11	+37	9
2	Romania	3	2	0	1	31	30	+1	6
3	Germany	3	1	0	2	29	39	−10	3
4	Georgia	3	0	0	3	16	44	−28	0

Source: wpbelgrade2016.com
Rules for classification: 1) points; 2) head-to-head points; 3) head-to-head goal difference; 4) head-to-head number of goals scored; 5) goal difference.

11 January 2016; 09:30	Report	Georgia	6–12	Romania	Kombank Arena, Belgrade; Referees: Mario Dalli (MLT), Xavier Buch (ESP)
11 January 2016; 09:30	Report	Score by quarters: 1–2, 3–2, 1–5, 1–3			Kombank Arena, Belgrade; Referees: Mario Dalli (MLT), Xavier Buch (ESP)
11 January 2016; 09:30	Report	Baghaturia, Tsrepulia 2	Goals	Gheorghe 4	Kombank Arena, Belgrade; Referees: Mario Dalli (MLT), Xavier Buch (ESP)

11 January 2016; 18:45	Report	Germany	5–16	Italy	Kombank Arena, Belgrade; Referees: Benjamin Mercier (FRA), Vojin Putniković (SRB)
11 January 2016; 18:45	Report	Score by quarters: 0–2, 1–6, 3–4, 1–4			Kombank Arena, Belgrade; Referees: Benjamin Mercier (FRA), Vojin Putniković (SRB)
11 January 2016; 18:45	Report	five players 1	Goals	Aicardi, Bodegas 3	Kombank Arena, Belgrade; Referees: Benjamin Mercier (FRA), Vojin Putniković (SRB)

13 January 2016; 09:30	Report	Germany	11–9	Georgia	Kombank Arena, Belgrade; Referees: Dragan Štampalija (CRO), Matan Schwartz (ISR)
13 January 2016; 09:30	Report	Score by quarters: 1–3, 4–3, 3–2, 3–1			Kombank Arena, Belgrade; Referees: Dragan Štampalija (CRO), Matan Schwartz (ISR)
13 January 2016; 09:30	Report	Nossek 3	Goals	Elez, Tsrepulia 3	Kombank Arena, Belgrade; Referees: Dragan Štampalija (CRO), Matan Schwartz (ISR)

13 January 2016; 18:45	Report	Romania	5–11	Italy	Kombank Arena, Belgrade; Referees: Stanko Ivanovski (MNE), Radosław Koryzna (POL)
13 January 2016; 18:45	Report	Score by quarters: 0–2, 1–4, 1–3, 3–2			Kombank Arena, Belgrade; Referees: Stanko Ivanovski (MNE), Radosław Koryzna (POL)
13 January 2016; 18:45	Report	Radu 3	Goals	Bodegas 3	Kombank Arena, Belgrade; Referees: Stanko Ivanovski (MNE), Radosław Koryzna (POL)

15 January 2016; 17:15	Report	Georgia	1–21	Italy	Kombank Arena, Belgrade; Referees: Xavier Buch (ESP), Radosław Koryzna (POL)
15 January 2016; 17:15	Report	Score by quarters: 1–5, 0–6, 0–6, 0–4			Kombank Arena, Belgrade; Referees: Xavier Buch (ESP), Radosław Koryzna (POL)
15 January 2016; 17:15	Report	Baghaturia 1	Goals	Di Fulvio 4	Kombank Arena, Belgrade; Referees: Xavier Buch (ESP), Radosław Koryzna (POL)

15 January 2016; 18:45	Report	Germany	13–14	Romania	Kombank Arena, Belgrade; Referees: Mark Koganov (AZE), Benjamin Mercier (FRA)
15 January 2016; 18:45	Report	Score by quarters: 3–3, 2–3, 5–5, 3–3			Kombank Arena, Belgrade; Referees: Mark Koganov (AZE), Benjamin Mercier (FRA)
15 January 2016; 18:45	Report	Cuk, Real 4	Goals	Radu 4	Kombank Arena, Belgrade; Referees: Mark Koganov (AZE), Benjamin Mercier (FRA)

=== Group D ===
Pos	Team	Pld	W	D	L	GF	GA	GD	Pts
1	Hungary	3	2	1	0	40	19	+21	7
2	Russia	3	2	0	1	32	28	+4	6
3	Greece	3	1	1	1	37	23	+14	4
4	Turkey	3	0	0	3	19	58	−39	0

Source: wpbelgrade2016.com
Rules for classification: 1) points; 2) head-to-head points; 3) head-to-head goal difference; 4) head-to-head number of goals scored; 5) goal difference.

11 January 2016; 15:45	Report	Russia	17–8	Turkey	Kombank Arena, Belgrade; Referees: Radosław Koryzna (POL), Stanko Ivanovski (MNE)
11 January 2016; 15:45	Report	Score by quarters: 4–3, 4–0, 3–3, 6–2			Kombank Arena, Belgrade; Referees: Radosław Koryzna (POL), Stanko Ivanovski (MNE)
11 January 2016; 15:45	Report	Bugaychuk 4	Goals	Aksentijević, Šutalo 2	Kombank Arena, Belgrade; Referees: Radosław Koryzna (POL), Stanko Ivanovski (MNE)

11 January 2016; 20:15	Report	Hungary	8–8	Greece	Kombank Arena, Belgrade; Referees: Mark Koganov (AZE), Dragan Štampalija (CRO)
11 January 2016; 20:15	Report	Score by quarters: 3–2, 2–3, 2–1, 1–2			Kombank Arena, Belgrade; Referees: Mark Koganov (AZE), Dragan Štampalija (CRO)
11 January 2016; 20:15	Report	Dé. Varga, Hárai 3	Goals	three players 2	Kombank Arena, Belgrade; Referees: Mark Koganov (AZE), Dragan Štampalija (CRO)

13 January 2016; 15:45	Report	Turkey	6–21	Greece	Kombank Arena, Belgrade; Referees: Luís Santos (POR), Mario Dalli (MLT)
13 January 2016; 15:45	Report	Score by quarters: 1–2, 3–6, 1–6, 1–7			Kombank Arena, Belgrade; Referees: Luís Santos (POR), Mario Dalli (MLT)
13 January 2016; 15:45	Report	Ozbakis 2	Goals	Gounas 6	Kombank Arena, Belgrade; Referees: Luís Santos (POR), Mario Dalli (MLT)

13 January 2016; 20:15	Report	Hungary	12–6	Russia	Kombank Arena, Belgrade; Referees: Xavier Buch (ESP), Benjamin Mercier (FRA)
13 January 2016; 20:15	Report	Score by quarters: 1–4, 3–1, 3–0, 5–1			Kombank Arena, Belgrade; Referees: Xavier Buch (ESP), Benjamin Mercier (FRA)
13 January 2016; 20:15	Report	Bátori 5	Goals	Kholod 3	Kombank Arena, Belgrade; Referees: Xavier Buch (ESP), Benjamin Mercier (FRA)

15 January 2016; 09:30	Report	Hungary	20–5	Turkey	Kombank Arena, Belgrade; Referees: Stanko Ivanovski (MNE), Matan Schwartz (ISR)
15 January 2016; 09:30	Report	Score by quarters: 4–0, 4–1, 5–1, 7–3			Kombank Arena, Belgrade; Referees: Stanko Ivanovski (MNE), Matan Schwartz (ISR)
15 January 2016; 09:30	Report	Dé. Varga 6	Goals	Šutalo 2	Kombank Arena, Belgrade; Referees: Stanko Ivanovski (MNE), Matan Schwartz (ISR)

15 January 2016; 20:15	Report	Russia	9–8	Greece	Kombank Arena, Belgrade; Referees: Vojin Putniković (SRB), Boris Margeta (SLO)
15 January 2016; 20:15	Report	Score by quarters: 2–2, 2–2, 2–4, 3–0			Kombank Arena, Belgrade; Referees: Vojin Putniković (SRB), Boris Margeta (SLO)
15 January 2016; 20:15	Report	Bugaychuk 3	Goals	Genidounias, Vlachopoulos 2	Kombank Arena, Belgrade; Referees: Vojin Putniković (SRB), Boris Margeta (SLO)

== Knockout stage ==
Round of 16
Spain	14
Malta	3
Romania	9
Greece	15
Serbia	10
Slovakia	5
Russia	9
Germany	6
Italy	16
Turkey	2
Montenegro	11
France	6
Hungary	14
Georgia	3
Croatia	16
Netherlands	9

Quarterfinals
Spain	2
Greece	6
Serbia	15
Russia	5
Italy	7
Montenegro	10
Hungary	8
Croatia	5

Semifinals
Greece	7
Serbia	13
Montenegro	8
Hungary	5

Final
Serbia	10
Montenegro	8
Third place
Greece	10
Hungary	13

5th place bracket

5–8th place semifinals
Spain	10
Russia	9
Italy	8
Croatia	6

Fifth place
Spain	8
Italy	7
Seventh place
Russia	5
Croatia	13

9th place bracket

9–16th place quarterfinals
Malta	7
Romania	12
Slovakia	8 (7)
Germany (pen.)	8 (8)
Turkey	9
France	14
Georgia	9 (6)
Netherlands (pen.)	9 (7)

9–12th place semifinals
Romania (pen.)	10 (4)
Germany	10 (3)
France	11
Netherlands	8

Ninth place
Romania	6
France	12
Eleventh place
Germany	9
Netherlands	7

13th place bracket

13–16th place semifinals
Malta	9
Slovakia	17
Turkey	11
Georgia	12

13th place
Slovakia	10
Georgia	9
15th place
Malta (pen.)	10 (4)
Turkey	10 (3)

=== Round of 16 ===
16 January 2016; 09:30	Report	Spain	14–3	Malta	Kombank Arena, Belgrade; Referees: Radosław Koryzna (POL), Mark Koganov (AZE)
16 January 2016; 09:30	Report	Score by quarters: 3–1, 3–0, 7–1, 1–1			Kombank Arena, Belgrade; Referees: Radosław Koryzna (POL), Mark Koganov (AZE)
16 January 2016; 09:30	Report	Español, Tahull 3	Goals	three players 1	Kombank Arena, Belgrade; Referees: Radosław Koryzna (POL), Mark Koganov (AZE)

16 January 2016; 17:15	Report	Montenegro	11–6	France	Kombank Arena, Belgrade; Referees: Adrian Alexandrescu (ROU), Haldun Toygarlı (TUR)
16 January 2016; 17:15	Report	Score by quarters: 6–3, 1–0, 2–1, 2–2			Kombank Arena, Belgrade; Referees: Adrian Alexandrescu (ROU), Haldun Toygarlı (TUR)
16 January 2016; 17:15	Report	Vukčević 3	Goals	three players 2	Kombank Arena, Belgrade; Referees: Adrian Alexandrescu (ROU), Haldun Toygarlı (TUR)

16 January 2016; 18:45	Report	Serbia	10–5	Slovakia	Kombank Arena, Belgrade; Attendance: 8,419; Referees: György Kun (HUN), Luís Santos (POR)
16 January 2016; 18:45	Report	Score by quarters: 3–3, 3–1, 2–1, 2–0			Kombank Arena, Belgrade; Attendance: 8,419; Referees: György Kun (HUN), Luís Santos (POR)
16 January 2016; 18:45	Report	four players 2	Goals	Hrosik, Faměra 2	Kombank Arena, Belgrade; Attendance: 8,419; Referees: György Kun (HUN), Luís Santos (POR)

16 January 2016; 20:15	Report	Croatia	16–9	Netherlands	Kombank Arena, Belgrade; Referees: Matan Schwartz (ISR), Boris Margeta (SLO)
16 January 2016; 20:15	Report	Score by quarters: 4–1, 3–2, 4–3, 5–3			Kombank Arena, Belgrade; Referees: Matan Schwartz (ISR), Boris Margeta (SLO)
16 January 2016; 20:15	Report	Joković, Sukno 5	Goals	Lindhout 3	Kombank Arena, Belgrade; Referees: Matan Schwartz (ISR), Boris Margeta (SLO)

17 January 2016; 09:30	Report	Italy	16–2	Turkey	Kombank Arena, Belgrade; Referees: Frank Ohme (GER), Luís Santos (POR)
17 January 2016; 09:30	Report	Score by quarters: 4–0, 3–0, 5–1, 4–1			Kombank Arena, Belgrade; Referees: Frank Ohme (GER), Luís Santos (POR)
17 January 2016; 09:30	Report	three players 3	Goals	Beskardesler, Okman 1	Kombank Arena, Belgrade; Referees: Frank Ohme (GER), Luís Santos (POR)

17 January 2016; 17:15	Report	Hungary	14–3	Georgia	Kombank Arena, Belgrade; Referees: Mario Dalli (MLT), Boris Margeta (SLO)
17 January 2016; 17:15	Report	Score by quarters: 4–1, 4–1, 3–1, 3–0			Kombank Arena, Belgrade; Referees: Mario Dalli (MLT), Boris Margeta (SLO)
17 January 2016; 17:15	Report	Dé. Varga 3	Goals	Rurua 2	Kombank Arena, Belgrade; Referees: Mario Dalli (MLT), Boris Margeta (SLO)

17 January 2016; 18:45	Report	Romania	9–15	Greece	Kombank Arena, Belgrade; Referees: Alessandro Severo (ITA), Dragan Štampalija (CRO)
17 January 2016; 18:45	Report	Score by quarters: 3–5, 3–5, 1–4, 2–1			Kombank Arena, Belgrade; Referees: Alessandro Severo (ITA), Dragan Štampalija (CRO)
17 January 2016; 18:45	Report	Gheorghe 5	Goals	Fountoulis 6	Kombank Arena, Belgrade; Referees: Alessandro Severo (ITA), Dragan Štampalija (CRO)

17 January 2016; 20:15	Report	Russia	9–6	Germany	Kombank Arena, Belgrade; Referees: Stanko Ivanovski (MNE), György Kun (HUN)
17 January 2016; 20:15	Report	Score by quarters: 2–2, 3–1, 2–1, 2–2			Kombank Arena, Belgrade; Referees: Stanko Ivanovski (MNE), György Kun (HUN)
17 January 2016; 20:15	Report	three players 2	Goals	Nossek 2	Kombank Arena, Belgrade; Referees: Stanko Ivanovski (MNE), György Kun (HUN)

=== 9–16th place quarterfinals ===
18 January 2016; 09:30	Report	Malta	7–12	Romania	Kombank Arena, Belgrade; Referees: Benjamin Mercier (FRA), Xavier Buch (ESP)
18 January 2016; 09:30	Report	Score by quarters: 2–4, 2–5, 1–1, 2–2			Kombank Arena, Belgrade; Referees: Benjamin Mercier (FRA), Xavier Buch (ESP)
18 January 2016; 09:30	Report	S. Camilleri 4	Goals	Negrean 5	Kombank Arena, Belgrade; Referees: Benjamin Mercier (FRA), Xavier Buch (ESP)

18 January 2016; 11:00	Report	Slovakia	8–8; PSO: 7–8	Germany	Kombank Arena, Belgrade; Referees: Dragan Štampalija (CRO), Georgios Stavridis (GRE)
18 January 2016; 11:00	Report	Score by quarters: 3–1, 1–1, 2–4, 2–2			Kombank Arena, Belgrade; Referees: Dragan Štampalija (CRO), Georgios Stavridis (GRE)
18 January 2016; 11:00	Report	Tkáč, Zaťovič 2	Goals	three players 2	Kombank Arena, Belgrade; Referees: Dragan Štampalija (CRO), Georgios Stavridis (GRE)

19 January 2016; 09:30	Report	Turkey	9–14	France	Kombank Arena, Belgrade; Referees: Dragan Štampalija (CRO), Boris Margeta (SLO)
19 January 2016; 09:30	Report	Score by quarters: 3–4, 3–4, 0–4, 3–2			Kombank Arena, Belgrade; Referees: Dragan Štampalija (CRO), Boris Margeta (SLO)
19 January 2016; 09:30	Report	Beskardesler 3	Goals	Khasz, Simon 3	Kombank Arena, Belgrade; Referees: Dragan Štampalija (CRO), Boris Margeta (SLO)

19 January 2016; 11:00	Report	Georgia	9–9; PSO: 6–7	Netherlands	Kombank Arena, Belgrade; Referees: Radosław Koryzna (POL), Vojin Putniković (SRB)
19 January 2016; 11:00	Report	Score by quarters: 2–1, 3–4, 2–4, 2–0			Kombank Arena, Belgrade; Referees: Radosław Koryzna (POL), Vojin Putniković (SRB)
19 January 2016; 11:00	Report	Tsrepulia 4	Goals	Gielen 3	Kombank Arena, Belgrade; Referees: Radosław Koryzna (POL), Vojin Putniković (SRB)

=== Quarterfinals ===
18 January 2016; 18:45	Report	Spain	2–6	Greece	Kombank Arena, Belgrade; Referees: György Kun (HUN), Boris Margeta (SLO)
18 January 2016; 18:45	Report	Score by quarters: 0–2, 1–1, 1–2, 0–1			Kombank Arena, Belgrade; Referees: György Kun (HUN), Boris Margeta (SLO)
18 January 2016; 18:45	Report	Mallarach 2	Goals	Fountoulis 3	Kombank Arena, Belgrade; Referees: György Kun (HUN), Boris Margeta (SLO)

18 January 2016; 20:15	Report	Serbia	15–5	Russia	Kombank Arena, Belgrade; Attendance: 11,000; Referees: Alessandro Severo (ITA), Matan Schwartz (ISR)
18 January 2016; 20:15	Report	Score by quarters: 3–2, 4–1, 4–2, 4–0			Kombank Arena, Belgrade; Attendance: 11,000; Referees: Alessandro Severo (ITA), Matan Schwartz (ISR)
18 January 2016; 20:15	Report	Mandić, Prlainović 3	Goals	five players 1	Kombank Arena, Belgrade; Attendance: 11,000; Referees: Alessandro Severo (ITA), Matan Schwartz (ISR)

19 January 2016; 18:45	Report	Italy	7–10	Montenegro	Kombank Arena, Belgrade; Referees: Matan Schwartz (ISR), Adrian Alexandrescu (ROU)
19 January 2016; 18:45	Report	Score by quarters: 2–3, 0–1, 3–4, 2–2			Kombank Arena, Belgrade; Referees: Matan Schwartz (ISR), Adrian Alexandrescu (ROU)
19 January 2016; 18:45	Report	Di Fulvio 2	Goals	N. Janović 4	Kombank Arena, Belgrade; Referees: Matan Schwartz (ISR), Adrian Alexandrescu (ROU)

19 January 2016; 20:15	Report	Hungary	8–5	Croatia	Kombank Arena, Belgrade; Referees: Sergey Naumov (RUS), Xavier Buch (ESP)
19 January 2016; 20:15	Report	Score by quarters: 2–1, 3–2, 1–1, 2–1			Kombank Arena, Belgrade; Referees: Sergey Naumov (RUS), Xavier Buch (ESP)
19 January 2016; 20:15	Report	Dé. Varga 3	Goals	Vukicević 2	Kombank Arena, Belgrade; Referees: Sergey Naumov (RUS), Xavier Buch (ESP)

=== 13–16th place semifinals ===
20 January 2016; 09:00	Report	Malta	9–17	Slovakia	Kombank Arena, Belgrade; Referees: Luís Santos (POR), Boris Margeta (SLO)
20 January 2016; 09:00	Report	Score by quarters: 1–4, 2–3, 4–5, 2–5			Kombank Arena, Belgrade; Referees: Luís Santos (POR), Boris Margeta (SLO)
20 January 2016; 09:00	Report	S. Camilleri 6	Goals	Faměra 5	Kombank Arena, Belgrade; Referees: Luís Santos (POR), Boris Margeta (SLO)

21 January 2016; 09:00	Report	Turkey	11–12	Georgia	Kombank Arena, Belgrade; Referees: Matan Schwartz (ISR), György Kun (HUN)
21 January 2016; 09:00	Report	Score by quarters: 2–5, 2–3, 3–3, 4–1			Kombank Arena, Belgrade; Referees: Matan Schwartz (ISR), György Kun (HUN)
21 January 2016; 09:00	Report	Korolija 3	Goals	Baghaturia 3	Kombank Arena, Belgrade; Referees: Matan Schwartz (ISR), György Kun (HUN)

=== 9–12th place semifinals ===
20 January 2016; 10:30	Report	Romania	10–10; PSO: 4–3	Germany	Kombank Arena, Belgrade; Referees: Stanko Ivanovski (MNE), Sergey Naumov (RUS)
20 January 2016; 10:30	Report	Score by quarters: 5–2, 1–1, 0–4, 4–3			Kombank Arena, Belgrade; Referees: Stanko Ivanovski (MNE), Sergey Naumov (RUS)
20 January 2016; 10:30	Report	Negrean 4	Goals	Bukowsi 3	Kombank Arena, Belgrade; Referees: Stanko Ivanovski (MNE), Sergey Naumov (RUS)

21 January 2016; 10:30	Report	France	11–8	Netherlands	Kombank Arena, Belgrade; Referees: Haldun Toygarlı (TUR), Stanko Ivanovski (MNE)
21 January 2016; 10:30	Report	Score by quarters: 5–1, 2–5, 3–1, 1–1			Kombank Arena, Belgrade; Referees: Haldun Toygarlı (TUR), Stanko Ivanovski (MNE)
21 January 2016; 10:30	Report	four players 2	Goals	Gielen 2	Kombank Arena, Belgrade; Referees: Haldun Toygarlı (TUR), Stanko Ivanovski (MNE)

=== 5–8th place semifinals ===
20 January 2016; 18:45	Report	Spain	10–9	Russia	Kombank Arena, Belgrade; Referees: Radosław Koryzna (POL), Vojin Putniković (SRB)
20 January 2016; 18:45	Report	Score by quarters: 2–1, 4–2, 2–2, 2–4			Kombank Arena, Belgrade; Referees: Radosław Koryzna (POL), Vojin Putniković (SRB)
20 January 2016; 18:45	Report	three players 2	Goals	Magomaev 3	Kombank Arena, Belgrade; Referees: Radosław Koryzna (POL), Vojin Putniković (SRB)

21 January 2016; 18:45	Report	Italy	8–6	Croatia	Kombank Arena, Belgrade; Referees: Boris Margeta (SLO), Georgios Stavridis (GRE)
21 January 2016; 18:45	Report	Score by quarters: 6–1, 0–1, 2–1, 0–3			Kombank Arena, Belgrade; Referees: Boris Margeta (SLO), Georgios Stavridis (GRE)
21 January 2016; 18:45	Report	three players 2	Goals	Sukno 2	Kombank Arena, Belgrade; Referees: Boris Margeta (SLO), Georgios Stavridis (GRE)

=== Semifinals ===
20 January 2016; 20:15	Report	Greece	7–13	Serbia	Kombank Arena, Belgrade; Attendance: 11,000; Referees: Dragan Štampalija (CRO), Adrian Alexandrescu (ROU)
20 January 2016; 20:15	Report	Score by quarters: 3–4, 0–2, 1–4, 3–3			Kombank Arena, Belgrade; Attendance: 11,000; Referees: Dragan Štampalija (CRO), Adrian Alexandrescu (ROU)
20 January 2016; 20:15	Report	Gounas, Vlachopoulos 2	Goals	Filipović, Pijetlović 3	Kombank Arena, Belgrade; Attendance: 11,000; Referees: Dragan Štampalija (CRO), Adrian Alexandrescu (ROU)

21 January 2016; 20:15	Report	Montenegro	8–5	Hungary	Kombank Arena, Belgrade; Referees: Alessandro Severo (ITA), Radosław Koryzna (POL)
21 January 2016; 20:15	Report	Score by quarters: 2–2, 2–1, 1–1, 3–1			Kombank Arena, Belgrade; Referees: Alessandro Severo (ITA), Radosław Koryzna (POL)
21 January 2016; 20:15	Report	Ivović, N. Janović 2	Goals	Manhercz, Dé. Varga 2	Kombank Arena, Belgrade; Referees: Alessandro Severo (ITA), Radosław Koryzna (POL)

=== 15th place game ===
22 January 2016; 09:00	Report	Malta	10–10; PSO: 4–3	Turkey	Kombank Arena, Belgrade; Referees: Benjamin Mercier (FRA), Frank Ohme (GER)
22 January 2016; 09:00	Report	Score by quarters: 3–3, 2–0, 3–5, 2–2			Kombank Arena, Belgrade; Referees: Benjamin Mercier (FRA), Frank Ohme (GER)
22 January 2016; 09:00	Report	S. Camilleri 4	Goals	Aksentijević 3	Kombank Arena, Belgrade; Referees: Benjamin Mercier (FRA), Frank Ohme (GER)

=== 13th place game ===
22 January 2016; 10:30	Report	Slovakia	10–9	Georgia	Kombank Arena, Belgrade; Referees: Stanko Ivanovski (MNE), Mario Dalli (MLT)
22 January 2016; 10:30	Report	Score by quarters: 2–2, 1–2, 4–4, 3–1			Kombank Arena, Belgrade; Referees: Stanko Ivanovski (MNE), Mario Dalli (MLT)
22 January 2016; 10:30	Report	Zaťovič 3	Goals	Jelaca, Kavtaradze 2	Kombank Arena, Belgrade; Referees: Stanko Ivanovski (MNE), Mario Dalli (MLT)

=== Eleventh place game ===
23 January 2016; 09:00	Report	Germany	9–7	Netherlands	Kombank Arena, Belgrade; Referees: Dragan Štampalija (CRO), Xavier Buch (ESP)
23 January 2016; 09:00	Report	Score by quarters: 2–1, 3–4, 2–1, 2–1			Kombank Arena, Belgrade; Referees: Dragan Štampalija (CRO), Xavier Buch (ESP)
23 January 2016; 09:00	Report	three players 2	Goals	Lindhout, Koopman 2	Kombank Arena, Belgrade; Referees: Dragan Štampalija (CRO), Xavier Buch (ESP)

=== Ninth place game ===
23 January 2016; 10:30	Report	Romania	6–12	France	Kombank Arena, Belgrade; Referees: Radosław Koryzna (POL), György Kun (HUN)
23 January 2016; 10:30	Report	Score by quarters: 1–6, 1–2, 1–2, 3–2			Kombank Arena, Belgrade; Referees: Radosław Koryzna (POL), György Kun (HUN)
23 January 2016; 10:30	Report	Radu 2	Goals	Marzouki 5	Kombank Arena, Belgrade; Referees: Radosław Koryzna (POL), György Kun (HUN)

=== Seventh place game ===
23 January 2016; 12:00	Report	Russia	5–13	Croatia	Kombank Arena, Belgrade; Referees: Adrian Alexandrescu (ROU), Alessandro Svero (ITA)
23 January 2016; 12:00	Report	Score by quarters: 0–2, 3–3, 1–4, 1–4			Kombank Arena, Belgrade; Referees: Adrian Alexandrescu (ROU), Alessandro Svero (ITA)
23 January 2016; 12:00	Report	Bychkov, Kholod 2	Goals	Bukić, Šetka 3	Kombank Arena, Belgrade; Referees: Adrian Alexandrescu (ROU), Alessandro Svero (ITA)

=== Fifth place game ===
23 January 2016; 13:30	Report	Spain	8–7	Italy	Kombank Arena, Belgrade; Referees: Vojin Putniković (SRB), Stanko Ivanovski (MNE)
23 January 2016; 13:30	Report	Score by quarters: 2–1, 4–2, 1–3, 1–1			Kombank Arena, Belgrade; Referees: Vojin Putniković (SRB), Stanko Ivanovski (MNE)
23 January 2016; 13:30	Report	Molina Rios, Munarriz 2	Goals	Giorgetti 3	Kombank Arena, Belgrade; Referees: Vojin Putniković (SRB), Stanko Ivanovski (MNE)

=== Third place game ===
23 January 2016; 16:15	Report	Greece	10–13	Hungary	Kombank Arena, Belgrade; Referees: Matan Schwartz (ISR), Mark Koganov (AZE)
23 January 2016; 16:15	Report	Score by quarters: 2–4, 2–4, 1–2, 5–3			Kombank Arena, Belgrade; Referees: Matan Schwartz (ISR), Mark Koganov (AZE)
23 January 2016; 16:15	Report	Vlachopoulos 4	Goals	Vámos 3	Kombank Arena, Belgrade; Referees: Matan Schwartz (ISR), Mark Koganov (AZE)

=== Final ===
23 January 2016; 17:45	Report	Serbia	10–8	Montenegro	Kombank Arena, Belgrade; Attendance: 18,473; Referees: Boris Margeta (SLO), Georgios Stavridis (GRE)
23 January 2016; 17:45	Report	Score by quarters: 1–3, 2–1, 3–2, 4–2			Kombank Arena, Belgrade; Attendance: 18,473; Referees: Boris Margeta (SLO), Georgios Stavridis (GRE)
23 January 2016; 17:45	Report	three players 2	Goals	three players 2	Kombank Arena, Belgrade; Attendance: 18,473; Referees: Boris Margeta (SLO), Georgios Stavridis (GRE)

== Final ranking ==
Qualified for the Summer Olympics
Already qualified for the Summer Olympics
Qualified for the Summer Olympics final qualification tournament

Rank	Team
1st place, gold medalist(s)	Serbia
2nd place, silver medalist(s)	Montenegro
3rd place, bronze medalist(s)	Hungary
4	Greece
5	Spain
6	Italy
7	Croatia
8	Russia
9	France
10	Romania
11	Germany
12	Netherlands
13	Slovakia
14	Georgia
15	Malta
16	Turkey

=== Top goalscorers ===
Rank	Name	Goals	Shots	%
1	(Malta) Steven Camilleri	21	55	38
2	(Hungary) Dénes Varga	19	39	49
3	(Serbia) Andrija Prlainović	18	37	49
4	(Greece) Ioannis Fountoulis	17	42	41
4	(Romania) Tiberiu Negrean	17	43	40
6	(Montenegro) Aleksandar Radović	16	30	53
7	(Croatia) Sandro Sukno	15	39	39
7	(Romania) Cosmin Radu	15	25	60
9	(France) Ugo Crousillat	14	34	41
9	(France) Mehdi Marzouki	14	37	38
9	(Slovakia) Martin Faměra	14	45	31
9	(Spain) Albert Español	14	38	37
9	(Spain) Guillermo Molina Rios	14	36	39

Source: wpbelgrade2016.microplustiming.com

== Awards ==
Top Goalscorer	Player of the Tournament	Goalkeeper of the Tournament
(Malta) Steven Camilleri	(Serbia) Andrija Prlainović	(Hungary) Viktor Nagy
