= 2018 Men's European Water Polo Championship =

- Official logo

Tournament details
- Host country: Spain
- Venue: 1 (in 1 host city)
- Dates: 16–28 July
- Teams: 16 (from 1 confederation)

Final positions
- Champions: Serbia (8th title)
- Runners-up: Spain
- Third place: Croatia
- Fourth place: Italy

Tournament statistics
- Matches played: 48
- Goals scored: 863 (17.98 per match)
- Top scorers: (Greece) Ioannis Fountoulis (Montenegro) Aleksandar Ivović (17 goals)

Awards
- Best player: (Serbia) Filip Filipović

The 2018 Men's European Water Polo Championship was held in Barcelona, Spain from 16 to 28 July 2018.

Serbia won their fourth consecutive and eighth overall title by defeating Spain in the final.

== Qualification ==
Sixteen teams will be allowed to the tournament. The qualification is as follows:

- The host nation
- The best seven teams from the 2016 European Championships not already qualified as the host nation
- Eight teams from the qualifiers

Event	Date	Location	Vacancies	Qualified
Host nation	–	–	1	Spain
2016 European Championships	10–23 January 2016	(Serbia) Belgrade	7	Croatia; Greece; Hungary; Italy; Montenegro; Russia; Serbia
Qualifiers	17 March 2017 – 3 March 2018	–	8	France; Romania; Germany; Netherlands; Slovakia; Georgia; Malta; Turkey

== Format ==
The sixteen teams were split in four groups with four teams each. The first classified team of each group qualified directly for the quarterfinals, the second and third teams played each other in cross group format to qualify for the quarterfinals.

== Draw ==
The draw of the tournament took take place on 7 March in Barcelona. The first batch consisted of the teams ranked 1st to 4th in the 2016 European Championships, the second batch consisted of the teams ranked 5th to eight. The third batch was filled with teams that qualified in the qualifiers.

Pot 1

Serbia
Montenegro
Hungary
Greece

Pot 2

Spain
Italy
Croatia
Russia

Pot 3

France	Slovakia
Romania	Georgia
Germany	Malta
Netherlands	Turkey

== Preliminary round ==
All times are local (UTC+2).

=== Group A ===
Pos	Team	Pld	W	D	L	GF	GA	GD	Pts	Qualification
1	Italy	3	3	0	0	40	9	+31	9	Quarterfinals
2	Hungary	3	1	1	1	21	21	0	4 (Note: Germany 4–4 Hungary)	Play-offs
3	Germany	3	1	1	1	15	27	−12	4	Play-offs
4	Georgia	3	0	0	3	17	36	−19	0	13th place classification

Source: Wp2018bcn.com
Rules for classification: 1) points; 2) head-to-head points; 3) head-to-head goal difference; 4) head-to-head number of goals scored; 5) goal difference.
Notes:

16 July 2018; 15:30	Report	Georgia	5–12	Hungary	Piscines Bernat Picornell, Barcelona; Referees: Boris Margeta (SLO), Luis Santos (POR)
16 July 2018; 15:30	Report	Score by quarters: 1–3, 2–2, 2–3, 0–4			Piscines Bernat Picornell, Barcelona; Referees: Boris Margeta (SLO), Luis Santos (POR)
16 July 2018; 15:30	Report	Tsrepulia 2	Goals	Bátori 3	Piscines Bernat Picornell, Barcelona; Referees: Boris Margeta (SLO), Luis Santos (POR)

16 July 2018; 18:30	Report	Germany	1–14	Italy	Piscines Bernat Picornell, Barcelona; Referees: Stanko Ivanovski (MNE), Ivan Raković (SRB)
16 July 2018; 18:30	Report	Score by quarters: 0–2, 0–4, 0–2, 1–6			Piscines Bernat Picornell, Barcelona; Referees: Stanko Ivanovski (MNE), Ivan Raković (SRB)
16 July 2018; 18:30	Report	Zech 1	Goals	four players 2	Piscines Bernat Picornell, Barcelona; Referees: Stanko Ivanovski (MNE), Ivan Raković (SRB)

18 July 2018; 12:30	Report	Germany	10–9	Georgia	Piscines Bernat Picornell, Barcelona; Referees: Boris Margeta (SLO), Adrian Alexandrescu (ROU)
18 July 2018; 12:30	Report	Score by quarters: 1–3, 3–2, 3–2, 3–2			Piscines Bernat Picornell, Barcelona; Referees: Boris Margeta (SLO), Adrian Alexandrescu (ROU)
18 July 2018; 12:30	Report	Real 4	Goals	Baghaturia, Rurua 2	Piscines Bernat Picornell, Barcelona; Referees: Boris Margeta (SLO), Adrian Alexandrescu (ROU)

18 July 2018; 20:30	Report	Hungary	5–12	Italy	Piscines Bernat Picornell, Barcelona; Referees: Georgios Stavridis (GRE), Sergey Naumov (RUS)
18 July 2018; 20:30	Report	Score by quarters: 0–5, 4–2, 0–2, 1–3			Piscines Bernat Picornell, Barcelona; Referees: Georgios Stavridis (GRE), Sergey Naumov (RUS)
18 July 2018; 20:30	Report	Manhercz 2	Goals	four players 2	Piscines Bernat Picornell, Barcelona; Referees: Georgios Stavridis (GRE), Sergey Naumov (RUS)

20 July 2018; 12:30	Report	Germany	4–4	Hungary	Piscines Bernat Picornell, Barcelona; Referees: Benjamin Mercier (FRA), Ivan Raković (SRB)
20 July 2018; 12:30	Report	Score by quarters: 1–0, 0–1, 2–2, 1–1			Piscines Bernat Picornell, Barcelona; Referees: Benjamin Mercier (FRA), Ivan Raković (SRB)
20 July 2018; 12:30	Report	Real 3	Goals	four players 1	Piscines Bernat Picornell, Barcelona; Referees: Benjamin Mercier (FRA), Ivan Raković (SRB)

20 July 2018; 15:30	Report	Georgia	3–14	Italy	Piscines Bernat Picornell, Barcelona; Referees: Stanko Ivanovski (MNE), Xavier Buch (ESP)
20 July 2018; 15:30	Report	Score by quarters: 0–3, 1–3, 1–5, 1–3			Piscines Bernat Picornell, Barcelona; Referees: Stanko Ivanovski (MNE), Xavier Buch (ESP)
20 July 2018; 15:30	Report	Rurua 2	Goals	six players 2	Piscines Bernat Picornell, Barcelona; Referees: Stanko Ivanovski (MNE), Xavier Buch (ESP)

=== Group B ===
Pos	Team	Pld	W	D	L	GF	GA	GD	Pts	Qualification
1	Spain (H)	3	2	1	0	35	15	+20	7 (Note: Montenegro 7–7 Spain)	Quarterfinals
2	Montenegro	3	2	1	0	32	18	+14	7	Play-offs
3	France	3	1	0	2	22	21	+1	3	Play-offs
4	Malta	3	0	0	3	15	50	−35	0	13th place classification

Source: Wp2018bcn.com
Rules for classification: 1) points; 2) head-to-head points; 3) head-to-head goal difference; 4) head-to-head number of goals scored; 5) goal difference.
(H) Hosts
Notes:

16 July 2018; 11:00	Report	Montenegro	8–6	France	Piscines Bernat Picornell, Barcelona; Referees: Adrian Alexandrescu (ROU), Haldun Toygarli (TUR)
16 July 2018; 11:00	Report	Score by quarters: 3–1, 1–1, 2–2, 2–2			Piscines Bernat Picornell, Barcelona; Referees: Adrian Alexandrescu (ROU), Haldun Toygarli (TUR)
16 July 2018; 11:00	Report	Ivović 3	Goals	Crousillat 3	Piscines Bernat Picornell, Barcelona; Referees: Adrian Alexandrescu (ROU), Haldun Toygarli (TUR)

16 July 2018; 22:15	Report	Malta	4–21	Spain	Piscines Bernat Picornell, Barcelona; Referees: Sergey Naumov (RUS), Irakli Kikalishvili (GEO)
16 July 2018; 22:15	Report	Score by quarters: 1–4, 0–5, 2–8, 1–4			Piscines Bernat Picornell, Barcelona; Referees: Sergey Naumov (RUS), Irakli Kikalishvili (GEO)
16 July 2018; 22:15	Report	S. Camilleri 2	Goals	Granados, Tahull 4	Piscines Bernat Picornell, Barcelona; Referees: Sergey Naumov (RUS), Irakli Kikalishvili (GEO)

18 July 2018; 17:00	Report	Montenegro	17–5	Malta	Piscines Bernat Picornell, Barcelona; Referees: Gabriella Várkonyi (HUN), Irakli Kikalishvili (GEO)
18 July 2018; 17:00	Report	Score by quarters: 4–1, 7–0, 4–2, 2–2			Piscines Bernat Picornell, Barcelona; Referees: Gabriella Várkonyi (HUN), Irakli Kikalishvili (GEO)
18 July 2018; 17:00	Report	Ivović, Radović 3	Goals	Zammit 2	Piscines Bernat Picornell, Barcelona; Referees: Gabriella Várkonyi (HUN), Irakli Kikalishvili (GEO)

18 July 2018; 22:00	Report	Spain	7–4	France	Piscines Bernat Picornell, Barcelona; Referees: Matan Schwartz (ISR), Attilio Paoletti (ITA)
18 July 2018; 22:00	Report	Score by quarters: 1–0, 4–1, 2–2, 0–1			Piscines Bernat Picornell, Barcelona; Referees: Matan Schwartz (ISR), Attilio Paoletti (ITA)
18 July 2018; 22:00	Report	Munarriz 4	Goals	Guillaume 2	Piscines Bernat Picornell, Barcelona; Referees: Matan Schwartz (ISR), Attilio Paoletti (ITA)

20 July 2018; 18:30	Report	Malta	6–12	France	Piscines Bernat Picornell, Barcelona; Referees: Nenad Periš (CRO), Diana Dutilh-Dumas (NED)
20 July 2018; 18:30	Report	Score by quarters: 0–3, 1–2, 3–3, 2–4			Piscines Bernat Picornell, Barcelona; Referees: Nenad Periš (CRO), Diana Dutilh-Dumas (NED)
20 July 2018; 18:30	Report	Plumpton 2	Goals	Crousillat 4	Piscines Bernat Picornell, Barcelona; Referees: Nenad Periš (CRO), Diana Dutilh-Dumas (NED)

20 July 2018; 22:00	Report	Montenegro	7–7	Spain	Piscines Bernat Picornell, Barcelona; Referees: Boris Margeta (SLO), Georgios Stavridis (GRE)
20 July 2018; 22:00	Report	Score by quarters: 3–2, 2–1, 0–3, 2–1			Piscines Bernat Picornell, Barcelona; Referees: Boris Margeta (SLO), Georgios Stavridis (GRE)
20 July 2018; 22:00	Report	Ivović 4	Goals	Perrone, Tahull 2	Piscines Bernat Picornell, Barcelona; Referees: Boris Margeta (SLO), Georgios Stavridis (GRE)

=== Group C ===
Pos	Team	Pld	W	D	L	GF	GA	GD	Pts	Qualification
1	Croatia	3	3	0	0	49	17	+32	9	Quarterfinals
2	Greece	3	2	0	1	46	19	+27	6	Play-offs
3	Netherlands	3	1	0	2	37	32	+5	3	Play-offs
4	Turkey	3	0	0	3	8	72	−64	0	13th place classification

Source: Wp2018bcn.com
Rules for classification: 1) points; 2) head-to-head points; 3) head-to-head goal difference; 4) head-to-head number of goals scored; 5) goal difference.

16 July 2018; 14:00	Report	Turkey	1–27	Greece	Piscines Bernat Picornell, Barcelona; Referees: Gabriella Várkonyi (HUN), Massimo Angileri (MLT)
16 July 2018; 14:00	Report	Score by quarters: 1–5, 0–7, 0–6, 0–9			Piscines Bernat Picornell, Barcelona; Referees: Gabriella Várkonyi (HUN), Massimo Angileri (MLT)
16 July 2018; 14:00	Report	Sönmez 1	Goals	Fountoulis 6	Piscines Bernat Picornell, Barcelona; Referees: Gabriella Várkonyi (HUN), Massimo Angileri (MLT)

16 July 2018; 17:00	Report	Croatia	15–8	Netherlands	Piscines Bernat Picornell, Barcelona; Referees: Benjamin Mercier (FRA), Radosław Koryzna (POL)
16 July 2018; 17:00	Report	Score by quarters: 4–2, 3–1, 4–1, 4–4			Piscines Bernat Picornell, Barcelona; Referees: Benjamin Mercier (FRA), Radosław Koryzna (POL)
16 July 2018; 17:00	Report	Vukičević 4	Goals	Lindhout 3	Piscines Bernat Picornell, Barcelona; Referees: Benjamin Mercier (FRA), Radosław Koryzna (POL)

18 July 2018; 11:00	Report	Croatia	23–2	Turkey	Piscines Bernat Picornell, Barcelona; Referees: Marcela Mauss (GER), Massimo Angileri (MLT)
18 July 2018; 11:00	Report	Score by quarters: 4–0, 7–1, 6–1, 6–0			Piscines Bernat Picornell, Barcelona; Referees: Marcela Mauss (GER), Massimo Angileri (MLT)
18 July 2018; 11:00	Report	Miloš 6	Goals	Düzenli, Özbek 1	Piscines Bernat Picornell, Barcelona; Referees: Marcela Mauss (GER), Massimo Angileri (MLT)

18 July 2018; 15:30	Report	Greece	12–7	Netherlands	Piscines Bernat Picornell, Barcelona; Referees: Xavier Buch (ESP), Ivan Raković (SRB)
18 July 2018; 15:30	Report	Score by quarters: 6–3, 3–2, 2–2, 1–0			Piscines Bernat Picornell, Barcelona; Referees: Xavier Buch (ESP), Ivan Raković (SRB)
18 July 2018; 15:30	Report	Vlachopoulos 6	Goals	Janssen, Lindhout 2	Piscines Bernat Picornell, Barcelona; Referees: Xavier Buch (ESP), Ivan Raković (SRB)

20 July 2018; 14:00	Report	Turkey	5–22	Netherlands	Piscines Bernat Picornell, Barcelona; Referees: Ursula Wengenroth (SUI), Luis Santos (POR)
20 July 2018; 14:00	Report	Score by quarters: 1–6, 1–5, 1–7, 2–4			Piscines Bernat Picornell, Barcelona; Referees: Ursula Wengenroth (SUI), Luis Santos (POR)
20 July 2018; 14:00	Report	Yılmaz 2	Goals	Janssen 4	Piscines Bernat Picornell, Barcelona; Referees: Ursula Wengenroth (SUI), Luis Santos (POR)

20 July 2018; 20:30	Report	Croatia	11–7	Greece	Piscines Bernat Picornell, Barcelona; Referees: Sergey Naumov (RUS), Adrian Alexandrescu (ROU)
20 July 2018; 20:30	Report	Score by quarters: 2–0, 5–4, 3–1, 1–2			Piscines Bernat Picornell, Barcelona; Referees: Sergey Naumov (RUS), Adrian Alexandrescu (ROU)
20 July 2018; 20:30	Report	García 4	Goals	three players 2	Piscines Bernat Picornell, Barcelona; Referees: Sergey Naumov (RUS), Adrian Alexandrescu (ROU)

=== Group D ===
Pos	Team	Pld	W	D	L	GF	GA	GD	Pts	Qualification
1	Serbia	3	3	0	0	35	19	+16	9	Quarterfinals
2	Russia	3	2	0	1	33	24	+9	6	Play-offs
3	Romania	3	1	0	2	21	28	−7	3	Play-offs
4	Slovakia	3	0	0	3	16	34	−18	0	13th place classification

Source: Wp2018bcn.com
Rules for classification: 1) points; 2) head-to-head points; 3) head-to-head goal difference; 4) head-to-head number of goals scored; 5) goal difference.

16 July 2018; 12:30	Report	Russia	12–6	Slovakia	Piscines Bernat Picornell, Barcelona; Referees: Attilio Paoletti (ITA), Georgios Stavridis (GRE)
16 July 2018; 12:30	Report	Score by quarters: 3–1, 2–1, 5–1, 2–3			Piscines Bernat Picornell, Barcelona; Referees: Attilio Paoletti (ITA), Georgios Stavridis (GRE)
16 July 2018; 12:30	Report	Andryukov, Nagaev 4	Goals	Mare. Tkáč 2	Piscines Bernat Picornell, Barcelona; Referees: Attilio Paoletti (ITA), Georgios Stavridis (GRE)

16 July 2018; 20:30	Report	Serbia	11–5	Romania	Piscines Bernat Picornell, Barcelona; Referees: Matan Schwartz (ISR), Xavier Buch (ESP)
16 July 2018; 20:30	Report	Score by quarters: 3–1, 3–1, 3–2, 2–1			Piscines Bernat Picornell, Barcelona; Referees: Matan Schwartz (ISR), Xavier Buch (ESP)
16 July 2018; 20:30	Report	Ćuk 3	Goals	Negrean 3	Piscines Bernat Picornell, Barcelona; Referees: Matan Schwartz (ISR), Xavier Buch (ESP)

18 July 2018; 14:00	Report	Romania	9–5	Slovakia	Piscines Bernat Picornell, Barcelona; Referees: Stanko Ivanovski (MNE), Nenad Periš (CRO)
18 July 2018; 14:00	Report	Score by quarters: 4–1, 2–0, 2–1, 1–3			Piscines Bernat Picornell, Barcelona; Referees: Stanko Ivanovski (MNE), Nenad Periš (CRO)
18 July 2018; 14:00	Report	Gheorghe 3	Goals	five players 1	Piscines Bernat Picornell, Barcelona; Referees: Stanko Ivanovski (MNE), Nenad Periš (CRO)

18 July 2018; 18:30	Report	Russia	9–11	Serbia	Piscines Bernat Picornell, Barcelona; Referees: Radosław Koryzna (POL), Benjamin Mercier (FRA)
18 July 2018; 18:30	Report	Score by quarters: 2–3, 3–3, 1–3, 3–2			Piscines Bernat Picornell, Barcelona; Referees: Radosław Koryzna (POL), Benjamin Mercier (FRA)
18 July 2018; 18:30	Report	three players 2	Goals	three players 2	Piscines Bernat Picornell, Barcelona; Referees: Radosław Koryzna (POL), Benjamin Mercier (FRA)

20 July 2018; 11:00	Report	Serbia	13–5	Slovakia	Piscines Bernat Picornell, Barcelona; Referees: Attilio Paoletti (ITA), Irakli Kikalishvili (GEO)
20 July 2018; 11:00	Report	Score by quarters: 5–1, 3–3, 2–1, 3–0			Piscines Bernat Picornell, Barcelona; Referees: Attilio Paoletti (ITA), Irakli Kikalishvili (GEO)
20 July 2018; 11:00	Report	six players 2	Goals	Úradník 2	Piscines Bernat Picornell, Barcelona; Referees: Attilio Paoletti (ITA), Irakli Kikalishvili (GEO)

20 July 2018; 17:00	Report	Russia	12–7	Romania	Piscines Bernat Picornell, Barcelona; Referees: Matan Schwartz (ISR), Radosław Koryzna (POL)
20 July 2018; 17:00	Report	Score by quarters: 1–3, 4–2, 3–1, 4–1			Piscines Bernat Picornell, Barcelona; Referees: Matan Schwartz (ISR), Radosław Koryzna (POL)
20 July 2018; 17:00	Report	Merkulov 5	Goals	Ghiban 2	Piscines Bernat Picornell, Barcelona; Referees: Matan Schwartz (ISR), Radosław Koryzna (POL)

== Knockout stage ==
Play-offs
22 July
Hungary	12
Netherlands	9
22 July
Montenegro	15
Romania	5
22 July
Germany	5
Greece	13
22 July
France	9
Russia	12

Quarterfinals
24 July
Serbia	8
Hungary	5
24 July
Croatia	9
Montenegro	7
24 July
Spain	10
Greece	6
24 July
Italy	11
Russia	1

Semifinals
26 July
Serbia	9
Croatia	7
26 July
Spain	8
Italy	7

Final
28 July
Serbia (PSO)	7 (5)
Spain	7 (3)
Third place
28 July
Croatia	10
Italy	8

5th place bracket

5–8th place semifinals
26 July
Hungary	6
Montenegro	7
26 July
Greece	12
Russia	11

Fifth place
28 July
Montenegro	6
Greece	8
Seventh place
28 July
Hungary	8
Russia	9

9th place bracket

9–12th place semifinals
24 July
Netherlands	12
Romania	7
24 July
Germany	12
France	5

Ninth place
26 July
Netherlands	11
Germany	12
Eleventh place
26 July
Romania	10
France	6

13th place bracket

13–16th place semifinals
22 July
Georgia	15
Turkey	10
22 July
Malta	6
Slovakia	11

13th place
24 July
Georgia	8
Slovakia	6
15th place
24 July
Turkey (PSO)	7 (6)
Malta	7 (5)

=== Play-offs ===
22 July 2018; 17:00	Report	Hungary	12–9	Netherlands	Piscines Bernat Picornell, Barcelona; Referees: Attilio Paoletti (ITA), Radosław Koryzna (POL)
22 July 2018; 17:00	Report	Score by quarters: 5–4, 4–2, 2–1, 1–2			Piscines Bernat Picornell, Barcelona; Referees: Attilio Paoletti (ITA), Radosław Koryzna (POL)
22 July 2018; 17:00	Report	Vámos 4	Goals	Filipović, Koopman 2	Piscines Bernat Picornell, Barcelona; Referees: Attilio Paoletti (ITA), Radosław Koryzna (POL)

22 July 2018; 18:30	Report	Germany	5–13	Greece	Piscines Bernat Picornell, Barcelona; Referees: Matan Schwartz (ISR), Ivan Raković (SRB)
22 July 2018; 18:30	Report	Score by quarters: 3–5, 0–3, 1–2, 1–3			Piscines Bernat Picornell, Barcelona; Referees: Matan Schwartz (ISR), Ivan Raković (SRB)
22 July 2018; 18:30	Report	Stamm 3	Goals	four players 2	Piscines Bernat Picornell, Barcelona; Referees: Matan Schwartz (ISR), Ivan Raković (SRB)

22 July 2018; 20:30	Report	Montenegro	15–5	Romania	Piscines Bernat Picornell, Barcelona; Referees: Xavier Buch (ESP), Georgios Stavridis (GRE)
22 July 2018; 20:30	Report	Score by quarters: 3–1, 3–1, 4–2, 5–1			Piscines Bernat Picornell, Barcelona; Referees: Xavier Buch (ESP), Georgios Stavridis (GRE)
22 July 2018; 20:30	Report	Petković, Radović 3	Goals	Negrean 2	Piscines Bernat Picornell, Barcelona; Referees: Xavier Buch (ESP), Georgios Stavridis (GRE)

22 July 2018; 22:00	Report	France	9–12	Russia	Piscines Bernat Picornell, Barcelona; Referees: Boris Margeta (SLO), Adrian Alexandrescu (ROU)
22 July 2018; 22:00	Report	Score by quarters: 1–4, 1–4, 4–2, 3–2			Piscines Bernat Picornell, Barcelona; Referees: Boris Margeta (SLO), Adrian Alexandrescu (ROU)
22 July 2018; 22:00	Report	Crousillat, Khasz 2	Goals	Lisunov 3	Piscines Bernat Picornell, Barcelona; Referees: Boris Margeta (SLO), Adrian Alexandrescu (ROU)

=== Quarterfinals ===
24 July 2018; 17:00	Report	Serbia	8–5	Hungary	Piscines Bernat Picornell, Barcelona; Referees: Attilio Paoletti (ITA), Sergey Naumov (RUS)
24 July 2018; 17:00	Report	Score by quarters: 4–0, 1–1, 2–2, 1–2			Piscines Bernat Picornell, Barcelona; Referees: Attilio Paoletti (ITA), Sergey Naumov (RUS)
24 July 2018; 17:00	Report	Jakšić 3	Goals	Bedő 2	Piscines Bernat Picornell, Barcelona; Referees: Attilio Paoletti (ITA), Sergey Naumov (RUS)

24 July 2018; 18:30	Report	Croatia	9–7	Montenegro	Piscines Bernat Picornell, Barcelona; Referees: Georgios Stavridis (GRE), Xavier Buch (ESP)
24 July 2018; 18:30	Report	Score by quarters: 1–2, 1–2, 4–2, 3–1			Piscines Bernat Picornell, Barcelona; Referees: Georgios Stavridis (GRE), Xavier Buch (ESP)
24 July 2018; 18:30	Report	Buljubašić 2	Goals	three players 2	Piscines Bernat Picornell, Barcelona; Referees: Georgios Stavridis (GRE), Xavier Buch (ESP)

24 July 2018; 20:30	Report	Italy	11–1	Russia	Piscines Bernat Picornell, Barcelona; Referees: Nenad Periš (CRO), Adrian Alexandrescu (ROU)
24 July 2018; 20:30	Report	Score by quarters: 2–0, 4–0, 1–1, 4–0			Piscines Bernat Picornell, Barcelona; Referees: Nenad Periš (CRO), Adrian Alexandrescu (ROU)
24 July 2018; 20:30	Report	Figlioli 4	Goals	Andryukov 1	Piscines Bernat Picornell, Barcelona; Referees: Nenad Periš (CRO), Adrian Alexandrescu (ROU)

24 July 2018; 22:00	Report	Spain	10–6	Greece	Piscines Bernat Picornell, Barcelona; Referees: Boris Margeta (SLO), Matan Schwartz (ISR)
24 July 2018; 22:00	Report	Score by quarters: 2–1, 2–2, 4–0, 2–3			Piscines Bernat Picornell, Barcelona; Referees: Boris Margeta (SLO), Matan Schwartz (ISR)
24 July 2018; 22:00	Report	three players 2	Goals	Genidounias 2	Piscines Bernat Picornell, Barcelona; Referees: Boris Margeta (SLO), Matan Schwartz (ISR)

=== 13–16th place semifinals ===
22 July 2018; 13:30	Report	Georgia	15–10	Turkey	Piscines Bernat Picornell, Barcelona; Referees: Stanko Ivanovski (MNE), Gabriella Várkonyi (HUN)
22 July 2018; 13:30	Report	Score by quarters: 6–3, 1–1, 3–3, 5–3			Piscines Bernat Picornell, Barcelona; Referees: Stanko Ivanovski (MNE), Gabriella Várkonyi (HUN)
22 July 2018; 13:30	Report	Bitadze 4	Goals	Bıyık, Ergin 4	Piscines Bernat Picornell, Barcelona; Referees: Stanko Ivanovski (MNE), Gabriella Várkonyi (HUN)

22 July 2018; 15:00	Report	Malta	6–11	Slovakia	Piscines Bernat Picornell, Barcelona; Referees: Benjamin Mercier (FRA), Luis Santos (POR)
22 July 2018; 15:00	Report	Score by quarters: 2–3, 1–4, 3–2, 0–2			Piscines Bernat Picornell, Barcelona; Referees: Benjamin Mercier (FRA), Luis Santos (POR)
22 July 2018; 15:00	Report	Zammit 2	Goals	Ďurík, Kolárik 3	Piscines Bernat Picornell, Barcelona; Referees: Benjamin Mercier (FRA), Luis Santos (POR)

=== 9–12th place semifinals ===
24 July 2018; 13:30	Report	Netherlands	12–7	Romania	Piscines Bernat Picornell, Barcelona; Referees: Ivan Raković (SRB), Gabriella Várkonyi (HUN)
24 July 2018; 13:30	Report	Score by quarters: 2–2, 4–1, 3–3, 3–1			Piscines Bernat Picornell, Barcelona; Referees: Ivan Raković (SRB), Gabriella Várkonyi (HUN)
24 July 2018; 13:30	Report	Koopman, Winkelhorst 3	Goals	Ghiban 2	Piscines Bernat Picornell, Barcelona; Referees: Ivan Raković (SRB), Gabriella Várkonyi (HUN)

24 July 2018; 15:00	Report	Germany	12–5	France	Piscines Bernat Picornell, Barcelona; Referees: Radosław Koryzna (POL), Stanko Ivanovski (MNE)
24 July 2018; 15:00	Report	Score by quarters: 4–2, 3–1, 1–1, 4–1			Piscines Bernat Picornell, Barcelona; Referees: Radosław Koryzna (POL), Stanko Ivanovski (MNE)
24 July 2018; 15:00	Report	Van der Bosch 3	Goals	Vanpeperstraete 2	Piscines Bernat Picornell, Barcelona; Referees: Radosław Koryzna (POL), Stanko Ivanovski (MNE)

=== 5–8th place semifinals ===
26 July 2018; 16:45	Report	Hungary	6–7	Montenegro	Piscines Bernat Picornell, Barcelona; Referees: Attilio Paoletti (ITA), Xavier Buch (ESP)
26 July 2018; 16:45	Report	Score by quarters: 1–2, 1–2, 2–2, 2–1			Piscines Bernat Picornell, Barcelona; Referees: Attilio Paoletti (ITA), Xavier Buch (ESP)
26 July 2018; 16:45	Report	Zalánki 2	Goals	Radović 3	Piscines Bernat Picornell, Barcelona; Referees: Attilio Paoletti (ITA), Xavier Buch (ESP)

26 July 2018; 18:15	Report	Greece	12–11	Russia	Piscines Bernat Picornell, Barcelona; Referees: Adrian Alexandrescu (ROU), Matan Schwartz (ISR)
26 July 2018; 18:15	Report	Score by quarters: 5–1, 4–4, 2–4, 1–2			Piscines Bernat Picornell, Barcelona; Referees: Adrian Alexandrescu (ROU), Matan Schwartz (ISR)
26 July 2018; 18:15	Report	Fountoulis 7	Goals	Bychkov 3	Piscines Bernat Picornell, Barcelona; Referees: Adrian Alexandrescu (ROU), Matan Schwartz (ISR)

=== Semifinals ===
26 July 2018; 20:30	Report	Serbia	9–7	Croatia	Piscines Bernat Picornell, Barcelona; Referees: Sergey Naumov (RUS), Radosław Koryzna (POL)
26 July 2018; 20:30	Report	Score by quarters: 5–3, 1–1, 1–1, 2–2			Piscines Bernat Picornell, Barcelona; Referees: Sergey Naumov (RUS), Radosław Koryzna (POL)
26 July 2018; 20:30	Report	Ćuk, Mandić 3	Goals	Vukičević 3	Piscines Bernat Picornell, Barcelona; Referees: Sergey Naumov (RUS), Radosław Koryzna (POL)

26 July 2018; 22:00	Report	Spain	8–7	Italy	Piscines Bernat Picornell, Barcelona; Referees: Boris Margeta (SLO), Georgios Stavridis (GRE)
26 July 2018; 22:00	Report	Score by quarters: 1–1, 3–2, 1–3, 3–1			Piscines Bernat Picornell, Barcelona; Referees: Boris Margeta (SLO), Georgios Stavridis (GRE)
26 July 2018; 22:00	Report	Tahull, Mallarach 2	Goals	Di Fulvio 3	Piscines Bernat Picornell, Barcelona; Referees: Boris Margeta (SLO), Georgios Stavridis (GRE)

=== 15th place game ===
24 July 2018; 10:30	Report	Turkey	13–12 (PSO)	Malta	Piscines Bernat Picornell, Barcelona; Referees: Irakli Kikalishvili (GEO), Diana Dutilh-Dumas (NED)
24 July 2018; 10:30	Report	Score by quarters: 3–1, 2–1, 0–2, 2–3 PSO: 6–5			Piscines Bernat Picornell, Barcelona; Referees: Irakli Kikalishvili (GEO), Diana Dutilh-Dumas (NED)
24 July 2018; 10:30	Report	Özbek 3	Goals	Bugelli, Zammit 2	Piscines Bernat Picornell, Barcelona; Referees: Irakli Kikalishvili (GEO), Diana Dutilh-Dumas (NED)

=== 13th place game ===
24 July 2018; 12:00	Report	Georgia	8–6	Slovakia	Piscines Bernat Picornell, Barcelona; Referees: Benjamin Mercier (FRA), Luis Santos (POR)
24 July 2018; 12:00	Report	Score by quarters: 1–1, 3–3, 3–2, 1–0			Piscines Bernat Picornell, Barcelona; Referees: Benjamin Mercier (FRA), Luis Santos (POR)
24 July 2018; 12:00	Report	Rurua 3	Goals	Kolárik 2	Piscines Bernat Picornell, Barcelona; Referees: Benjamin Mercier (FRA), Luis Santos (POR)

=== Eleventh place game ===
26 July 2018; 13:15	Report	Romania	10–6	France	Piscines Bernat Picornell, Barcelona; Referees: Haldun Taygarli (TUR), Stanko Ivanovski (MNE)
26 July 2018; 13:15	Report	Score by quarters: 2–1, 3–3, 4–1, 1–1			Piscines Bernat Picornell, Barcelona; Referees: Haldun Taygarli (TUR), Stanko Ivanovski (MNE)
26 July 2018; 13:15	Report	Radu 4	Goals	Crousillat 3	Piscines Bernat Picornell, Barcelona; Referees: Haldun Taygarli (TUR), Stanko Ivanovski (MNE)

=== Ninth place game ===
26 July 2018; 14:45	Report	Netherlands	11–12	Germany	Piscines Bernat Picornell, Barcelona; Referees: Luis Santos (POR), Benjamin Mercier (FRA)
26 July 2018; 14:45	Report	Score by quarters: 1–5, 4–4, 4–3, 2–0			Piscines Bernat Picornell, Barcelona; Referees: Luis Santos (POR), Benjamin Mercier (FRA)
26 July 2018; 14:45	Report	Winkelhorst 3	Goals	Real, Van der Bosch 3	Piscines Bernat Picornell, Barcelona; Referees: Luis Santos (POR), Benjamin Mercier (FRA)

=== Seventh place game ===
28 July 2018; 16:45	Report	Hungary	8–9	Russia	Piscines Bernat Picornell, Barcelona; Referees: Xavier Buch (ESP), Ivan Raković (SRB)
28 July 2018; 16:45	Report	Score by quarters: 1–2, 2–3, 1–3, 4–1			Piscines Bernat Picornell, Barcelona; Referees: Xavier Buch (ESP), Ivan Raković (SRB)
28 July 2018; 16:45	Report	Vámos 3	Goals	Kholod 3	Piscines Bernat Picornell, Barcelona; Referees: Xavier Buch (ESP), Ivan Raković (SRB)

=== Fifth place game ===
28 July 2018; 18:15	Report	Montenegro	6–8	Greece	Piscines Bernat Picornell, Barcelona; Referees: Sergey Naumov (RUS), Radosław Koryzna (POL)
28 July 2018; 18:15	Report	Score by quarters: 1–2, 3–3, 1–1, 1–2			Piscines Bernat Picornell, Barcelona; Referees: Sergey Naumov (RUS), Radosław Koryzna (POL)
28 July 2018; 18:15	Report	Ivović 3	Goals	four players 2	Piscines Bernat Picornell, Barcelona; Referees: Sergey Naumov (RUS), Radosław Koryzna (POL)

=== Third place game ===
28 July 2018; 20:30	Report	Croatia	10–8	Italy	Piscines Bernat Picornell, Barcelona; Referees: Georgios Stavridis (GRE), Matan Schwartz (ISR)
28 July 2018; 20:30	Report	Score by quarters: 4–0, 3–5, 2–1, 1–2			Piscines Bernat Picornell, Barcelona; Referees: Georgios Stavridis (GRE), Matan Schwartz (ISR)
28 July 2018; 20:30	Report	Fatović 3	Goals	Di Fulvio, Gallo 2	Piscines Bernat Picornell, Barcelona; Referees: Georgios Stavridis (GRE), Matan Schwartz (ISR)

=== Final ===
28 July 2018; 22:15	Report	Serbia	12–10 (PSO)	Spain	Piscines Bernat Picornell, Barcelona; Referees: Boris Margeta (SLO), Adrian Alexandrescu (ROU)
28 July 2018; 22:15	Report	Score by quarters: 0–1, 3–3, 3–2, 1–1 PSO: 5–3			Piscines Bernat Picornell, Barcelona; Referees: Boris Margeta (SLO), Adrian Alexandrescu (ROU)
28 July 2018; 22:15	Report	Prlainović 2	Goals	Mallarach, Perrone 2	Piscines Bernat Picornell, Barcelona; Referees: Boris Margeta (SLO), Adrian Alexandrescu (ROU)

== Final ranking ==
Qualified for the 2019 Fina World Championships from FINA World League
Qualified for the 2019 Fina World Championships from FINA World Cup
Qualified for the 2019 Fina World Championships

Rank	Team
1st place, gold medalist(s)	Serbia
2nd place, silver medalist(s)	Spain
3rd place, bronze medalist(s)	Croatia
4	Italy
5	Greece
6	Montenegro
7	Russia
8	Hungary
9	Germany
10	Netherlands
11	Romania
12	France
13	Georgia
14	Slovakia
15	Turkey
16	Malta

== Awards and statistics ==
=== Awards ===
Top Goalscorer	Player of the Tournament	Goalkeeper of the Tournament
(Montenegro) Aleksandar Ivović (Greece) Ioannis Fountoulis (17 goals)	(Serbia) Filip Filipović	(Spain) Daniel López

=== Top goalscorers ===
Rank	Name	Team	Goals	Shots	%
1	Ioannis Fountoulis	Greece	17	42	41
1	Aleksandar Ivović	Montenegro	17	39	44
3	Angelos Vlachopoulos	Greece	15	36	42
4	Ugo Crousillat	France	14	37	38
4	Ante Vukičević	Croatia	14	27	52
6	Ivan Nagaev	Russia	12	35	34
7	Francesco Di Fulvio	Italy	11	33	33
7	Loren Fatović	Croatia	11	19	58
7	Pietro Figlioli	Italy	11	20	55
7	Alexandros Gounas	Greece	11	29	38
7	Robin Lindhout	Netherlands	11	28	40
7	Julian Real	Germany	11	32	34
7	Roger Tahull	Spain	11	19	58

Source: wp2018bcn.microplustiming.com

=== Top goalkeepers ===
Rank	Name	Team	%	Saves	Shots
1	Ivan Marcelić	Croatia	83	5	6
2	Marco Del Lungo	Italy	71	55	77
2	Gojko Pijetlović	Serbia	71	10	14
4	Soma Vogel	Hungary	69	27	39
5	Milan de Koff	Netherlands	67	6	9
5	Eduardo Lorrio	Spain	67	6	9
7	Daniel López	Spain	64	57	89
8	Dejan Lazović	Montenegro	62	60	97
9	Gianmarco Nicosia	Italy	62	8	13
10	Branislav Mitrović	Serbia	58	45	78

Source: wp2018bcn.microplustiming.com
