= 2016 Men's European Water Polo Championship Qualifiers =

2016 Men's European Water Polo Championship Qualifiers are series of qualification tournaments to decide the participants of the 2016 Men's European Water Polo Championship.

== Teams directly qualified to the 2016 EWPC ==
- Serbia (Hosts, Winners of 2014 Men's European Water Polo Championship)
- Hungary (Runners-up, 2014 Men's European Water Polo Championship)
- Italy (3rd Place, 2014 Men's European Water Polo Championship)
- Montenegro (4th Place, 2014 Men's European Water Polo Championship)
- Croatia (5th Place, 2014 Men's European Water Polo Championship)
- Greece (6th Place, 2014 Men's European Water Polo Championship)
- Spain (7th Place, 2014 Men's European Water Polo Championship)
- Romania (8th Place, 2014 Men's European Water Polo Championship)

== Qualifying round 1 ==
=== Group A ===
Team	Pld	W	D	L	GF	GA	GD	Pts
Slovakia	3	3	0	0	51	22	+29	9
Georgia	3	2	0	1	52	23	+29	6
Portugal	3	1	0	2	22	43	-21	3
Switzerland	3	0	0	3	22	59	-37	0

6 February 2015; 16:45	Report	Georgia	10–11	Slovakia	Olympic Pool, Tbilisi; Referees: Andras Nemeth (HUN), Mehmet Sungu (TUR)
6 February 2015; 16:45	Report	Score by quarters: 1–1, 4–5, 2–2, 3–3			Olympic Pool, Tbilisi; Referees: Andras Nemeth (HUN), Mehmet Sungu (TUR)
6 February 2015; 16:45	Report	five players 1	Goals	Durik 4	Olympic Pool, Tbilisi; Referees: Andras Nemeth (HUN), Mehmet Sungu (TUR)

6 February 2015; 18:00	Report	Portugal	13–7	Switzerland	Olympic Pool, Tbilisi; Referees: Peter van der Loo (NED), Eduard Vasenin (RUS)
6 February 2015; 18:00	Report	Score by quarters: 1–2, 1–1, 5–2, 6–2			Olympic Pool, Tbilisi; Referees: Peter van der Loo (NED), Eduard Vasenin (RUS)

7 February 2015; 15:00	Report	Portugal	6–15	Slovakia	Olympic Pool, Tbilisi; Referees: Andras Nemeth (HUN), Eduard Vasenin (RUS)
7 February 2015; 15:00	Report	Score by quarters: 2–4, 1–3, 0–4, 3–4			Olympic Pool, Tbilisi; Referees: Andras Nemeth (HUN), Eduard Vasenin (RUS)

7 February 2015; 16:40	Report	Georgia	21–9	Switzerland	Olympic Pool, Tbilisi; Referees: Mehmet Sungu (TUR), Peter van der Loo (NED)
7 February 2015; 16:40	Report	Score by quarters: 6–1, 5–2, 4–3, 6–3			Olympic Pool, Tbilisi; Referees: Mehmet Sungu (TUR), Peter van der Loo (NED)

8 February 2015; 08:00	Report	Slovakia	25–6	Switzerland	Olympic Pool, Tbilisi; Referees: Andras Nemeth (HUN), Mehmet Sungu (TUR)
8 February 2015; 08:00	Report	Score by quarters: 6–0, 7–2, 9–3, 3–1			Olympic Pool, Tbilisi; Referees: Andras Nemeth (HUN), Mehmet Sungu (TUR)

8 February 2015; 09:45	Report	Georgia	21–3	Portugal	Olympic Pool, Tbilisi; Referees: Peter van der Loo (NED), Eduard Vasenin (RUS)
8 February 2015; 09:45	Report	Score by quarters: 4–1, 7–1, 4–0, 6–1			Olympic Pool, Tbilisi; Referees: Peter van der Loo (NED), Eduard Vasenin (RUS)

=== Group B ===
Team	Pld	W	D	L	GF	GA	GD	Pts
Russia	3	3	0	0	59	14	+45	9
Poland	3	2	0	1	30	31	-1	6
Israel	3	1	0	2	24	48	-24	3
Ukraine	3	0	0	3	20	40	-20	0

6 February 2015; 18:00	Report	Ukraine	9–12	Israel	Basen Słowianka, Gorzów Wielkopolski; Referees: Irakli Kikalishvili (GEO), Martina Kunikova (SVK), Hendrik Schop (GER)
6 February 2015; 18:00	Report	Score by quarters: 3–3, 3–5, 2–3, 1–1			Basen Słowianka, Gorzów Wielkopolski; Referees: Irakli Kikalishvili (GEO), Martina Kunikova (SVK), Hendrik Schop (GER)
6 February 2015; 18:00	Report	Abramov 2	Goals	Goldschmidt 5	Basen Słowianka, Gorzów Wielkopolski; Referees: Irakli Kikalishvili (GEO), Martina Kunikova (SVK), Hendrik Schop (GER)

6 February 2015; 19:30	Report	Poland	6–16	Russia	Basen Słowianka, Gorzów Wielkopolski; Referees: Philipp Golosoun (BLR), Hendrik Schop (GER)
6 February 2015; 19:30	Report	Score by quarters: 1–5, 1–3, 2–5, 2–3			Basen Słowianka, Gorzów Wielkopolski; Referees: Philipp Golosoun (BLR), Hendrik Schop (GER)
6 February 2015; 19:30	Report	Leszek 2	Goals	Nagaev 4	Basen Słowianka, Gorzów Wielkopolski; Referees: Philipp Golosoun (BLR), Hendrik Schop (GER)

7 February 2015; 18:00	Report	Russia	16–3	Ukraine	Basen Słowianka, Gorzów Wielkopolski; Referees: Martina Kunikova (SVK), Hendrik Schop (GER)
7 February 2015; 18:00	Report	Score by quarters: 1–1, 5–0, 4–1, 6–1			Basen Słowianka, Gorzów Wielkopolski; Referees: Martina Kunikova (SVK), Hendrik Schop (GER)
7 February 2015; 18:00	Report	Stepanyuk 5	Goals	three players 1	Basen Słowianka, Gorzów Wielkopolski; Referees: Martina Kunikova (SVK), Hendrik Schop (GER)

7 February 2015; 19:30	Report	Poland	12–7	Israel	Basen Słowianka, Gorzów Wielkopolski; Referees: Philipp Golosoun (BLR), Irakli Kikalishvili (GEO)
7 February 2015; 19:30	Report	Score by quarters: 4–1, 1–4, 4–0, 3–2			Basen Słowianka, Gorzów Wielkopolski; Referees: Philipp Golosoun (BLR), Irakli Kikalishvili (GEO)
7 February 2015; 19:30	Report	two players 3	Goals	two players 2	Basen Słowianka, Gorzów Wielkopolski; Referees: Philipp Golosoun (BLR), Irakli Kikalishvili (GEO)

8 February 2015; 10:00	Report	Russia	27–5	Israel	Basen Słowianka, Gorzów Wielkopolski; Referees: Hendrik Schop (GER), Philipp Golosoun (BLR)
8 February 2015; 10:00	Report	Score by quarters: 8–0, 5–3, 7–2, 7–0			Basen Słowianka, Gorzów Wielkopolski; Referees: Hendrik Schop (GER), Philipp Golosoun (BLR)
8 February 2015; 10:00	Report	two players 5	Goals	Goldschmidt 2	Basen Słowianka, Gorzów Wielkopolski; Referees: Hendrik Schop (GER), Philipp Golosoun (BLR)

8 February 2015; 10:00	Report	Poland	12–8	Ukraine	Basen Słowianka, Gorzów Wielkopolski; Referees: Irakli Kikalishvili (GEO), Martina Kunikova (SVK)
8 February 2015; 10:00	Report	Score by quarters: 2–2, 4–3, 3–1, 3–2			Basen Słowianka, Gorzów Wielkopolski; Referees: Irakli Kikalishvili (GEO), Martina Kunikova (SVK)
8 February 2015; 10:00	Report	two players 3	Goals	Dyadyura 5	Basen Słowianka, Gorzów Wielkopolski; Referees: Irakli Kikalishvili (GEO), Martina Kunikova (SVK)

=== Group C ===
Team	Pld	W	D	L	GF	GA	GD	Pts
Netherlands	3	3	0	0	83	20	+63	9
France	3	2	0	1	69	16	+53	6
Malta	3	1	0	2	51	41	+10	3
Latvia	3	0	0	3	1	127	-126	0

6 February 2015; 21:00	Report	Netherlands	52–0	Latvia	Zwembad De Krommerijn, Utrecht; Referees: Byelyevtsov Vyacheslav (UKR), Maciej Michalak (POL), Andreas Moiralis (GRE), Luís Santos (POR)
6 February 2015; 21:00	Report	Score by quarters: 15–0, 14–0, 9–0, 14–0			Zwembad De Krommerijn, Utrecht; Referees: Byelyevtsov Vyacheslav (UKR), Maciej Michalak (POL), Andreas Moiralis (GRE), Luís Santos (POR)
6 February 2015; 21:00	Report	Lindhout 12	Goals	none	Zwembad De Krommerijn, Utrecht; Referees: Byelyevtsov Vyacheslav (UKR), Maciej Michalak (POL), Andreas Moiralis (GRE), Luís Santos (POR)

6 February 2015; 22:30	Report	France	21–4	Malta	Zwembad De Krommerijn, Utrecht; Referees: Andreas Moiralis (GRE), Luís Santos (POR)
6 February 2015; 22:30	Report	Score by quarters: 4–0, 7–1, 5–2, 5–1			Zwembad De Krommerijn, Utrecht; Referees: Andreas Moiralis (GRE), Luís Santos (POR)
6 February 2015; 22:30	Report	Jablonski 6	Goals	Zammit 2	Zwembad De Krommerijn, Utrecht; Referees: Andreas Moiralis (GRE), Luís Santos (POR)

7 February 2015; 16:30	Report	Netherlands	19–11	Malta	Zwembad De Krommerijn, Utrecht; Referees: Luís Santos (POR), Byelyevtsov Vyacheslav (UKR)
7 February 2015; 16:30	Report	Score by quarters: 4–2, 3–4, 8–4, 4–1			Zwembad De Krommerijn, Utrecht; Referees: Luís Santos (POR), Byelyevtsov Vyacheslav (UKR)
7 February 2015; 16:30	Report	Lindhout 5	Goals	Camilleri 4	Zwembad De Krommerijn, Utrecht; Referees: Luís Santos (POR), Byelyevtsov Vyacheslav (UKR)

7 February 2015; 18:00	Report	France	39–0	Latvia	Zwembad De Krommerijn, Utrecht; Referees: Andreas Moiralis (GRE), Maciej Michalak (POL)
7 February 2015; 18:00	Report	Score by quarters: 8–0, 11–0, 9–0, 11–0			Zwembad De Krommerijn, Utrecht; Referees: Andreas Moiralis (GRE), Maciej Michalak (POL)
7 February 2015; 18:00	Report	Camarasa 11	Goals	none	Zwembad De Krommerijn, Utrecht; Referees: Andreas Moiralis (GRE), Maciej Michalak (POL)

8 February 2015; 13:30	Report	Malta	36–1	Latvia	Zwembad De Krommerijn, Utrecht; Referees: Andreas Moiralis (GRE), Byelyevtsov Vyacheslav (UKR)
8 February 2015; 13:30	Report	Score by quarters: 8–0, 11–0, 7–0, 10–1			Zwembad De Krommerijn, Utrecht; Referees: Andreas Moiralis (GRE), Byelyevtsov Vyacheslav (UKR)
8 February 2015; 13:30	Report	Camilleri 13	Goals	Vasiļonoks 1	Zwembad De Krommerijn, Utrecht; Referees: Andreas Moiralis (GRE), Byelyevtsov Vyacheslav (UKR)

8 February 2015; 15:00	Report	Netherlands	12–9	France	Zwembad De Krommerijn, Utrecht; Referees: Luís Santos (POR), Maciej Michalak (POL)
8 February 2015; 15:00	Report	Score by quarters: 7–2, 3–3, 1–2, 1–2			Zwembad De Krommerijn, Utrecht; Referees: Luís Santos (POR), Maciej Michalak (POL)
8 February 2015; 15:00	Report	Lindhout 5	Goals	three players 2	Zwembad De Krommerijn, Utrecht; Referees: Luís Santos (POR), Maciej Michalak (POL)

=== Group D ===
Team	Pld	W	D	L	GF	GA	GD	Pts
Germany	3	3	0	0	52	17	+35	9
Turkey	3	2	0	1	32	23	+9	6
Belarus	3	1	0	2	19	29	-10	3
Lithuania	3	0	0	3	11	45	-34	0

6 February 2015; 18:00	Report	Germany	20–2	Lithuania	Türkiye Sutopu Federasyonu Ataköy Olimpik Yüzme Havuzu, Istanbul; Referees: Massimo Angileri (MLT); Goran Kramer (SUI)
6 February 2015; 18:00	Report	Score by quarters: 5–0, 3–1, 7–0, 5–1			Türkiye Sutopu Federasyonu Ataköy Olimpik Yüzme Havuzu, Istanbul; Referees: Massimo Angileri (MLT); Goran Kramer (SUI)
6 February 2015; 18:00	Report	Nossek 5	Goals	Bakulo 2	Türkiye Sutopu Federasyonu Ataköy Olimpik Yüzme Havuzu, Istanbul; Referees: Massimo Angileri (MLT); Goran Kramer (SUI)

6 February 2015; 20:30	Report	Turkey	9–2	Belarus	Türkiye Sutopu Federasyonu Ataköy Olimpik Yüzme Havuzu, Istanbul; Referees: Benjamin Mercier (FRA), Valery Fogel (ISR)
6 February 2015; 20:30	Report	Score by quarters: 2–0, 2–0, 3–1, 2–1			Türkiye Sutopu Federasyonu Ataköy Olimpik Yüzme Havuzu, Istanbul; Referees: Benjamin Mercier (FRA), Valery Fogel (ISR)
6 February 2015; 20:30	Report	Bebiç 3	Goals	two players 2	Türkiye Sutopu Federasyonu Ataköy Olimpik Yüzme Havuzu, Istanbul; Referees: Benjamin Mercier (FRA), Valery Fogel (ISR)

7 February 2015; 19:00	Report	Turkey	14–6	Lithuania	Türkiye Sutopu Federasyonu Ataköy Olimpik Yüzme Havuzu, Istanbul; Referees: Goran Kramer (SUI), Valery Fogel (ISR)
7 February 2015; 19:00	Report	Score by quarters: 5–1, 3–0, 3–2, 3–3			Türkiye Sutopu Federasyonu Ataköy Olimpik Yüzme Havuzu, Istanbul; Referees: Goran Kramer (SUI), Valery Fogel (ISR)
7 February 2015; 19:00	Report	Bebiç 3	Goals	Bakulo 3	Türkiye Sutopu Federasyonu Ataköy Olimpik Yüzme Havuzu, Istanbul; Referees: Goran Kramer (SUI), Valery Fogel (ISR)

7 February 2015; 19:30	Report	Belarus	6–17	Germany	Türkiye Sutopu Federasyonu Ataköy Olimpik Yüzme Havuzu, Istanbul; Referees: Benjamin Mercier (FRA), Massimo Angileri (MLT)
7 February 2015; 19:30	Report	Score by quarters: 0–3, 2–4, 2–4, 2–6			Türkiye Sutopu Federasyonu Ataköy Olimpik Yüzme Havuzu, Istanbul; Referees: Benjamin Mercier (FRA), Massimo Angileri (MLT)
7 February 2015; 19:30	Report	two players 2	Goals	Bukowski 5	Türkiye Sutopu Federasyonu Ataköy Olimpik Yüzme Havuzu, Istanbul; Referees: Benjamin Mercier (FRA), Massimo Angileri (MLT)

8 February 2015; 13:00	Report	Lithuania	3–11	Belarus	Türkiye Sutopu Federasyonu Ataköy Olimpik Yüzme Havuzu, Istanbul; Referees: Benjamin Mercier (FRA), Goran Kramer (SUI)
8 February 2015; 13:00	Report	Score by quarters: 1–1, 0–2, 1–1, 1–7			Türkiye Sutopu Federasyonu Ataköy Olimpik Yüzme Havuzu, Istanbul; Referees: Benjamin Mercier (FRA), Goran Kramer (SUI)
8 February 2015; 13:00	Report	Sutkus 2	Goals	Kuzmenko 5	Türkiye Sutopu Federasyonu Ataköy Olimpik Yüzme Havuzu, Istanbul; Referees: Benjamin Mercier (FRA), Goran Kramer (SUI)

8 February 2015; 13:30	Report	Turkey	9–15	Germany	Türkiye Sutopu Federasyonu Ataköy Olimpik Yüzme Havuzu, Istanbul; Referees: Massimo Angileri (MLT), Valery Fogel (ISR)
8 February 2015; 13:30	Report	Score by quarters: 2–3, 4–3, 2–4, 1–5			Türkiye Sutopu Federasyonu Ataköy Olimpik Yüzme Havuzu, Istanbul; Referees: Massimo Angileri (MLT), Valery Fogel (ISR)
8 February 2015; 13:30	Report	Bebiç 3	Goals	Oeler 4	Türkiye Sutopu Federasyonu Ataköy Olimpik Yüzme Havuzu, Istanbul; Referees: Massimo Angileri (MLT), Valery Fogel (ISR)

== Qualifying round 2 ==
=== Group E ===
Team	Pld	W	D	L	GF	GA	GD	Pts
Netherlands	3	2	1	0	44	10	34	16
Georgia	3	2	1	0	40	17	23	13
Lithuania	3	1	0	2	20	51	-31	3
Israel	3	0	0	3	16	42	-26	3

25 September 2015; 16:30	Report	Netherlands	5–5	Georgia	Netanya, Israel; Referees: Gernot Haentschel (GER), Benjamin Mercier (FRA)
25 September 2015; 16:30	Report	Score by quarters: 1–1, 2–0, 1–2, 1–2			Netanya, Israel; Referees: Gernot Haentschel (GER), Benjamin Mercier (FRA)
25 September 2015; 16:30	Report	Lindhout 3	Goals	Tsrepulia, Baghaturia 2	Netanya, Israel; Referees: Gernot Haentschel (GER), Benjamin Mercier (FRA)

25 September 2015; 18:00	Report	Israel	8–11	Lithuania	Netanya, Israel; Referees: Serghei Melnicov (MDA), Luis Santos (POR)
25 September 2015; 18:00	Report	Score by quarters: 1–2, 3–2, 2–4, 2–3			Netanya, Israel; Referees: Serghei Melnicov (MDA), Luis Santos (POR)
25 September 2015; 18:00	Report	Eros 3	Goals	Bakulo 4	Netanya, Israel; Referees: Serghei Melnicov (MDA), Luis Santos (POR)

26 September 2015; 16:30	Report	Lithuania	3–25	Netherlands	Netanya, Israel; Referees: Gernot Haentschel (GER), Luis Santos (POR)
26 September 2015; 16:30	Report	Score by quarters: 0–5, 2–5, 0–7, 1–8			Netanya, Israel; Referees: Gernot Haentschel (GER), Luis Santos (POR)
26 September 2015; 16:30	Report	Bakulo 2	Goals	Winkelhorst, Gielen 5	Netanya, Israel; Referees: Gernot Haentschel (GER), Luis Santos (POR)

26 September 2015; 18:00	Report	Israel	6–17	Georgia	Netanya, Israel; Referees: Serghei Melnicov (MDA), Benjamin Mercier (FRA)
26 September 2015; 18:00	Report	Score by quarters: 1–5, 2–2, 1–5, 2–5			Netanya, Israel; Referees: Serghei Melnicov (MDA), Benjamin Mercier (FRA)
26 September 2015; 18:00	Report	Zonanstern 2	Goals	three players 3	Netanya, Israel; Referees: Serghei Melnicov (MDA), Benjamin Mercier (FRA)

27 September 2015; 9:30	Report	Georgia	18–6	Lithuania	Netanya, Israel; Referees: Gernot Haentschel (GER), Serghei Melnicov (MDA)
27 September 2015; 9:30	Report	Score by quarters: 5–1, 2–1, 6–1, 5–3			Netanya, Israel; Referees: Gernot Haentschel (GER), Serghei Melnicov (MDA)
27 September 2015; 9:30	Report	Khvedeliani, Gegelashvili 3	Goals	Bakulo 5	Netanya, Israel; Referees: Gernot Haentschel (GER), Serghei Melnicov (MDA)

27 September 2015; 11:00	Report	Israel	2–14	Netherlands	Netanya, Israel; Referees: Benjamin Mercier (FRA), Luis Santos (POR)
27 September 2015; 11:00	Report	Score by quarters: 0–4, 2–3, 0–3, 0–4			Netanya, Israel; Referees: Benjamin Mercier (FRA), Luis Santos (POR)
27 September 2015; 11:00	Report	Keren, Golan 1	Goals	Lucas 4	Netanya, Israel; Referees: Benjamin Mercier (FRA), Luis Santos (POR)

=== Group F ===
Team	Pld	W	D	L	GF	GA	GD	Pts
France	3	3	0	0	44	19	25	15
Slovakia	3	2	0	1	39	18	21	15
Belarus	3	0	1	2	18	43	-25	4
Ukraine	3	0	1	2	18	39	-21	1

25 September 2015; 18:00	Report	Ukraine	3–13	Slovakia	Chalons-en-Champagne, France; Referees: Mario Dalli (MLT), Valery Fogel (ISR)
25 September 2015; 18:00	Report	Score by quarters: 1–3, 0–4, 1–4, 1–2			Chalons-en-Champagne, France; Referees: Mario Dalli (MLT), Valery Fogel (ISR)
25 September 2015; 18:00	Report	–	Goals	–	Chalons-en-Champagne, France; Referees: Mario Dalli (MLT), Valery Fogel (ISR)

25 September 2015; 20:00	Report	France	17–4	Belarus	Chalons-en-Champagne, France; Referees: Irfan Sadekov (RUS), Krysztof Garbolewski (POL)
25 September 2015; 20:00	Report	Score by quarters: 4–1, 6–0, 5–2, 2–1			Chalons-en-Champagne, France; Referees: Irfan Sadekov (RUS), Krysztof Garbolewski (POL)
25 September 2015; 20:00	Report	Croussilat 4	Goals	–	Chalons-en-Champagne, France; Referees: Irfan Sadekov (RUS), Krysztof Garbolewski (POL)

26 September 2015; 18:00	Report	Belarus	9–9	Ukraine	Chalons-en-Champagne, France; Referees: Krysztof Garbolewski (POL), Valery Fogel (ISR)
26 September 2015; 18:00	Report	Score by quarters: 3–3, 2–2, 2–3, 2–1			Chalons-en-Champagne, France; Referees: Krysztof Garbolewski (POL), Valery Fogel (ISR)
26 September 2015; 18:00	Report	Ivanov 6	Goals	Dyadyura, Abramov 2	Chalons-en-Champagne, France; Referees: Krysztof Garbolewski (POL), Valery Fogel (ISR)

26 September 2015; 20:00	Report	France	10–9	Slovakia	Chalons-en-Champagne, France; Referees: Mario Dalli (MLT), Irfan Sadekov (RUS)
26 September 2015; 20:00	Report	Score by quarters: 3–3, 3–3, 1–0, 3–3			Chalons-en-Champagne, France; Referees: Mario Dalli (MLT), Irfan Sadekov (RUS)
26 September 2015; 20:00	Report	–	Goals	–	Chalons-en-Champagne, France; Referees: Mario Dalli (MLT), Irfan Sadekov (RUS)

27 September 2015; 9:00	Report	Slovakia	17–5	Belarus	Chalons-en-Champagne, France; Referees: Krysztof Garbolewski (POL), Irfan Sadekov (RUS)
27 September 2015; 9:00	Report	Score by quarters: 4–2, 4–0, 5–1, 4–2			Chalons-en-Champagne, France; Referees: Krysztof Garbolewski (POL), Irfan Sadekov (RUS)
27 September 2015; 9:00	Report	Famera, Tkac 3	Goals	Shalamitski 2	Chalons-en-Champagne, France; Referees: Krysztof Garbolewski (POL), Irfan Sadekov (RUS)

27 September 2015; 10:30	Report	France	17–6	Ukraine	Chalons-en-Champagne, France; Referees: Mario Dalli (MLT), Valery Fogel (ISR)
27 September 2015; 10:30	Report	Score by quarters: 6–1, 5–2, 3–2, 3–1			Chalons-en-Champagne, France; Referees: Mario Dalli (MLT), Valery Fogel (ISR)
27 September 2015; 10:30	Report	Laversanne 4	Goals	Voitenko 3	Chalons-en-Champagne, France; Referees: Mario Dalli (MLT), Valery Fogel (ISR)

=== Group G ===
Team	Pld	W	D	L	GF	GA	GD	Pts
Germany	3	3	0	0	55	6	49	18
Malta	3	2	0	1	36	40	-4	9
Poland	3	1	0	2	24	35	-11	9
Switzerland	3	0	0	3	20	54	-34	0

25 September 2015; 18:00	Report	Germany	10–3	Poland	Gzira, Malta; Referees: Mehmet Sungu (TUR), Martina Kunikova (SVK)
25 September 2015; 18:00	Report	Score by quarters: 1–0, 4–0, 2–2, 3–1			Gzira, Malta; Referees: Mehmet Sungu (TUR), Martina Kunikova (SVK)
25 September 2015; 18:00	Report	Nossek, Schlotterbeck 2	Goals	three players 1	Gzira, Malta; Referees: Mehmet Sungu (TUR), Martina Kunikova (SVK)

25 September 2015; 19:15	Report	Switzerland	8–20	Malta	Gzira, Malta; Referees: Irakli Kikalishvili (GEO), Constantin Siarov (BLR)
25 September 2015; 19:15	Report	Score by quarters: 5–3, 0–7, 1–6, 2–4			Gzira, Malta; Referees: Irakli Kikalishvili (GEO), Constantin Siarov (BLR)
25 September 2015; 19:15	Report	Pleyer 4	Goals	Lanzon 7	Gzira, Malta; Referees: Irakli Kikalishvili (GEO), Constantin Siarov (BLR)

26 September 2015; 18:00	Report	Germany	21–0	Switzerland	Gzira, Malta; Referees: Martina Kunikova (SVK), Constantin Siarov (BLR)
26 September 2015; 18:00	Report	Score by quarters: 4–0, 7–0, 6–0, 4–0			Gzira, Malta; Referees: Martina Kunikova (SVK), Constantin Siarov (BLR)
26 September 2015; 18:00	Report	Eidner 6	Goals		Gzira, Malta; Referees: Martina Kunikova (SVK), Constantin Siarov (BLR)

26 September 2015; 19:15	Report	Poland	8–13	Malta	Gzira, Malta; Referees: Mehmet Sungu (TUR), Irakli Kikalishvili (GEO)
26 September 2015; 19:15	Report	Score by quarters: 0–3, 2–5, 3–3, 3–2			Gzira, Malta; Referees: Mehmet Sungu (TUR), Irakli Kikalishvili (GEO)
26 September 2015; 19:15	Report	Leszek 3	Goals	Camilleri 4	Gzira, Malta; Referees: Mehmet Sungu (TUR), Irakli Kikalishvili (GEO)

27 September 2015; 9:00	Report	Poland	13–12	Switzerland	Gzira, Malta; Referees: Martina Kunikova (SVK), Irakli Kikalishvili (GEO)
27 September 2015; 9:00	Report	Score by quarters: 4–3, 2–1, 4–2, 3–6			Gzira, Malta; Referees: Martina Kunikova (SVK), Irakli Kikalishvili (GEO)
27 September 2015; 9:00	Report	Michalski 5	Goals	Pleyer 4	Gzira, Malta; Referees: Martina Kunikova (SVK), Irakli Kikalishvili (GEO)

27 September 2015; 10:15	Report	Germany	24–3	Malta	Gzira, Malta; Referees: Mehmet Sungu (TUR), Constantin Siarov (BLR)
27 September 2015; 10:15	Report	Score by quarters: 5–2, 5–1, 6–0, 8–0			Gzira, Malta; Referees: Mehmet Sungu (TUR), Constantin Siarov (BLR)
27 September 2015; 10:15	Report	Real, Stamm 4	Goals	three players 1	Gzira, Malta; Referees: Mehmet Sungu (TUR), Constantin Siarov (BLR)

=== Group H ===
Team	Pld	W	D	L	GF	GA	GD	Pts
Russia	3	3	0	0	64	12	52	18
Turkey	3	2	0	1	51	20	31	12
Portugal	3	1	0	2	43	30	13	6
Latvia	3	0	0	3	0	96	-96	0

25 September 2015; 17:00	Report	Turkey	14–9	Portugal	Astrakhan, Russia; Referees: Han Butz (NED), Volodymyr Kapinus (UKR)
25 September 2015; 17:00	Report	Score by quarters: 4–2, 4–2, 4–1, 2–4			Astrakhan, Russia; Referees: Han Butz (NED), Volodymyr Kapinus (UKR)
25 September 2015; 17:00	Report	Beskardesler 4	Goals	Rodrigues 5	Astrakhan, Russia; Referees: Han Butz (NED), Volodymyr Kapinus (UKR)

25 September 2015; 18:30	Report	Russia	37–0	Latvia	Astrakhan, Russia; Referees: Philipp Golosoun (BLR), Massimo Castrilli (SUI)
25 September 2015; 18:30	Report	Score by quarters: 9–0, 8–0, 9–0, 11–0			Astrakhan, Russia; Referees: Philipp Golosoun (BLR), Massimo Castrilli (SUI)
25 September 2015; 18:30	Report	Krasnov 9	Goals		Astrakhan, Russia; Referees: Philipp Golosoun (BLR), Massimo Castrilli (SUI)

26 September 2015; 17:00	Report	Latvia	0–30	Portugal	Astrakhan, Russia; Referees: Philipp Golosoun (BLR), Volodymyr Kapinus (UKR)
26 September 2015; 17:00	Report	Score by quarters: 0–6, 0–8, 0–7, 0–9			Astrakhan, Russia; Referees: Philipp Golosoun (BLR), Volodymyr Kapinus (UKR)
26 September 2015; 17:00	Report		Goals	three players 5	Astrakhan, Russia; Referees: Philipp Golosoun (BLR), Volodymyr Kapinus (UKR)

26 September 2015; 18:30	Report	Russia	11–8	Turkey	Astrakhan, Russia; Referees: Han Butz (NED), Massimo Castrilli (SUI)
26 September 2015; 18:30	Report	Score by quarters: 4–3, 1–0, 4–1, 2–4			Astrakhan, Russia; Referees: Han Butz (NED), Massimo Castrilli (SUI)
26 September 2015; 18:30	Report	four players 2	Goals	Korolija, Beskardesler 2	Astrakhan, Russia; Referees: Han Butz (NED), Massimo Castrilli (SUI)

27 September 2015; 17:00	Report	Turkey	29–0	Latvia	Astrakhan, Russia; Referees: Massimo Castrilli (SUI), Volodymyr Kapinus (UKR)
27 September 2015; 17:00	Report	Score by quarters: 7–0, 10–0, 5–0, 7–0			Astrakhan, Russia; Referees: Massimo Castrilli (SUI), Volodymyr Kapinus (UKR)
27 September 2015; 17:00	Report	Sutalo, Ozbakis 7	Goals		Astrakhan, Russia; Referees: Massimo Castrilli (SUI), Volodymyr Kapinus (UKR)

27 September 2015; 18:30	Report	Portugal	4–16	Russia	Astrakhan, Russia; Referees: Han Butz (NED), Philipp Golosoun (BLR)
27 September 2015; 18:30	Report	Score by quarters: 1–7, 1–2, 1–3, 1–4			Astrakhan, Russia; Referees: Han Butz (NED), Philipp Golosoun (BLR)
27 September 2015; 18:30	Report	Secrieru 3	Goals	Latypov 3	Astrakhan, Russia; Referees: Han Butz (NED), Philipp Golosoun (BLR)
