= Water polo at the 2016 Summer Olympics – Men's qualification =

2016 Men's Water Polo Olympic Games Qualification Tournament
Tournament details
- Host country: Italy
- Venue(s): 1 (in 1 host city)
- Dates: 3–10 April
- Teams: 12 (from 4 confederations)

Final positions
- Champions: Hungary
- Runners-up: Italy
- Third place: Spain
- Fourth place: France

Tournament statistics
- Matches played: 42
- Goals scored: 785 (18.69 per match)

The 2016 Men's Water Polo Olympic Qualification Tournament was held in Trieste, Italy, from 3 to 10 April 2016, at the Polo Natatorio "Bruno Bianchi". The top four teams advanced to the Olympics.

== Participants ==
There were 12 places originally allocated to continental associations in the tournament not already directly qualified to the Olympics – 9 from Europe, 1 from the Americas, 1 from Asia, and 1 from Africa.

| Continent | How qualified |
| Europe | |
|---|---|
| Italy | Host country |
| Hungary | 2016 European Championship bronze medalists |
| Spain | 2016 European Championship 5th place |
| Russia | 2016 European Championship 8th place |
| France | 2016 European Championship 9th place |
| Romania | 2016 European Championship 10th place |
| Germany | 2016 European Championship 11th place |
| Netherlands | 2016 European Championship 12th place |
| Slovakia | 2016 European Championship 13th place |
| Americas | |
| Canada | 2015 Pan American Games bronze medalists |
| Asia | |
| Kazakhstan | 2015 Asian Championship bronze medalists |
| Africa | |
| South Africa | African Continental Selection |

== Draw ==
The draw took place on 23 January 2016 in Belgrade, after the final of the 2016 European Championship.

== Preliminary round ==
All times are local (UTC+2).

=== Group A ===
| Pos | Team | Pld | W | D | L | GF | GA | GD | Pts | Qualification |
|---|---|---|---|---|---|---|---|---|---|---|
| 1 | Hungary | 5 | 4 | 1 | 0 | 73 | 44 | +29 | 9 | Advanced to quarterfinals |
| 2 | Canada | 5 | 3 | 2 | 0 | 55 | 44 | +11 | 8 | Advanced to quarterfinals |
| 3 | France | 5 | 3 | 0 | 2 | 46 | 56 | −10 | 6 | Advanced to quarterfinals |
| 4 | Romania | 5 | 1 | 2 | 2 | 50 | 53 | −3 | 4 | Advanced to quarterfinals |
| 5 | Russia | 5 | 1 | 1 | 3 | 40 | 49 | −9 | 3 | |
| 6 | Slovakia | 5 | 0 | 0 | 5 | 39 | 57 | −18 | 0 | |

Source: FINA
Rules for classification: 1) points; 2) head-to-head points; 3) head-to-head goal difference; 4) head-to-head number of goals scored; 5) goal difference.

| 3 April 2016; 13:50 | Report | Russia | 6–7 | Canada | Polo Natatorio Bruno Bianchi, Trieste; Attendance: 200; Referees: Georgios Stavridis (GRE), Sergio Galindo (ESP) |
| 3 April 2016; 13:50 | Report | Score by quarters: 1–1, 2–2, 2–1, 1–3 | | | Polo Natatorio Bruno Bianchi, Trieste; Attendance: 200; Referees: Georgios Stavridis (GRE), Sergio Galindo (ESP) |
| 3 April 2016; 13:50 | Report | Khalturin 3 | Goals | Boyd, Conway 2 | Polo Natatorio Bruno Bianchi, Trieste; Attendance: 200; Referees: Georgios Stavridis (GRE), Sergio Galindo (ESP) |

| 3 April 2016; 15:10 | Report | France | 7–13 | Hungary | Polo Natatorio Bruno Bianchi, Trieste; Attendance: 300; Referees: Filippo Gomez (ITA), Viktor Salnichenko (KAZ) |
| 3 April 2016; 15:10 | Report | Score by quarters: 0–6, 4–2, 0–3, 3–2 | | | Polo Natatorio Bruno Bianchi, Trieste; Attendance: 300; Referees: Filippo Gomez (ITA), Viktor Salnichenko (KAZ) |
| 3 April 2016; 15:10 | Report | Iždinský 3 | Goals | Vámos, Dá. Varga 3 | Polo Natatorio Bruno Bianchi, Trieste; Attendance: 300; Referees: Filippo Gomez (ITA), Viktor Salnichenko (KAZ) |

| 3 April 2016; 16:30 | Report | Slovakia | 11–13 | Romania | Polo Natatorio Bruno Bianchi, Trieste; Attendance: 350; Referees: Radosław Koryzna (POL), Henk Smit (NED) |
| 3 April 2016; 16:30 | Report | Score by quarters: 4–3, 2–5, 3–2, 2–3 | | | Polo Natatorio Bruno Bianchi, Trieste; Attendance: 350; Referees: Radosław Koryzna (POL), Henk Smit (NED) |
| 3 April 2016; 16:30 | Report | four players 2 | Goals | Negrean 6 | Polo Natatorio Bruno Bianchi, Trieste; Attendance: 350; Referees: Radosław Koryzna (POL), Henk Smit (NED) |

| 4 April 2016; 16:30 | Report | Canada | 14–14 | Hungary | Polo Natatorio Bruno Bianchi, Trieste; Attendance: 200; Referees: Joe Peila (USA), Dion Willis (RSA) |
| 4 April 2016; 16:30 | Report | Score by quarters: 3–4, 4–4, 4–5, 3–1 | | | Polo Natatorio Bruno Bianchi, Trieste; Attendance: 200; Referees: Joe Peila (USA), Dion Willis (RSA) |
| 4 April 2016; 16:30 | Report | Constantin-Bicari 4 | Goals | Manhercz, Dá. Varga 3 | Polo Natatorio Bruno Bianchi, Trieste; Attendance: 200; Referees: Joe Peila (USA), Dion Willis (RSA) |

| 4 April 2016; 17:50 | Report | Romania | 11–12 | France | Polo Natatorio Bruno Bianchi, Trieste; Attendance: 350; Referees: Georgios Stavridis (GRE), Gernot Häntschel (GER) |
| 4 April 2016; 17:50 | Report | Score by quarters: 4–3, 3–3, 3–4, 1–2 | | | Polo Natatorio Bruno Bianchi, Trieste; Attendance: 350; Referees: Georgios Stavridis (GRE), Gernot Häntschel (GER) |
| 4 April 2016; 17:50 | Report | Szabo 3 | Goals | Crousillat 5 | Polo Natatorio Bruno Bianchi, Trieste; Attendance: 350; Referees: Georgios Stavridis (GRE), Gernot Häntschel (GER) |

| 4 April 2016; 19:10 | Report | Russia | 7–4 | Slovakia | Polo Natatorio Bruno Bianchi, Trieste; Attendance: 400; Referees: Vojin Putniković (SRB), Filippo Gomez (ITA) |
| 4 April 2016; 19:10 | Report | Score by quarters: 2–0, 3–3, 0–1, 2–0 | | | Polo Natatorio Bruno Bianchi, Trieste; Attendance: 400; Referees: Vojin Putniković (SRB), Filippo Gomez (ITA) |
| 4 April 2016; 19:10 | Report | three players 2 | Goals | Kolárik 3 | Polo Natatorio Bruno Bianchi, Trieste; Attendance: 400; Referees: Vojin Putniković (SRB), Filippo Gomez (ITA) |

| 5 April 2016; 13:50 | Report | Hungary | 12–8 | Romania | Polo Natatorio Bruno Bianchi, Trieste; Attendance: 200; Referees: Filippo Gomez (ITA), Henk Smit (NED) |
| 5 April 2016; 13:50 | Report | Score by quarters: 4–2, 2–3, 4–1, 2–2 | | | Polo Natatorio Bruno Bianchi, Trieste; Attendance: 200; Referees: Filippo Gomez (ITA), Henk Smit (NED) |
| 5 April 2016; 13:50 | Report | Szívós 4 | Goals | Negrean 3 | Polo Natatorio Bruno Bianchi, Trieste; Attendance: 200; Referees: Filippo Gomez (ITA), Henk Smit (NED) |

| 5 April 2016; 15:10 | Report | Slovakia | 9–11 | Canada | Polo Natatorio Bruno Bianchi, Trieste; Attendance: 300; Referees: Radosław Koryzna (POL), Gernot Häntschel (GER) |
| 5 April 2016; 15:10 | Report | Score by quarters: 2–2, 1–5, 3–2, 3–2 | | | Polo Natatorio Bruno Bianchi, Trieste; Attendance: 300; Referees: Radosław Koryzna (POL), Gernot Häntschel (GER) |
| 5 April 2016; 15:10 | Report | three players 2 | Goals | four players 2 | Polo Natatorio Bruno Bianchi, Trieste; Attendance: 300; Referees: Radosław Koryzna (POL), Gernot Häntschel (GER) |

| 5 April 2016; 16:30 | Report | France | 12–11 | Russia | Polo Natatorio Bruno Bianchi, Trieste; Attendance: 300; Referees: Joe Peila (USA), Sergio Galindo (ESP) |
| 5 April 2016; 16:30 | Report | Score by quarters: 3–3, 5–4, 2–2, 2–2 | | | Polo Natatorio Bruno Bianchi, Trieste; Attendance: 300; Referees: Joe Peila (USA), Sergio Galindo (ESP) |
| 5 April 2016; 16:30 | Report | Crousillat 4 | Goals | Khalturin 4 | Polo Natatorio Bruno Bianchi, Trieste; Attendance: 300; Referees: Joe Peila (USA), Sergio Galindo (ESP) |

| 6 April 2016; 16:30 | Report | Canada | 10–10 | Romania | Polo Natatorio Bruno Bianchi, Trieste; Attendance: 300; Referees: Georgios Stavridis (GRE), Sergio Galindo (ESP) |
| 6 April 2016; 16:30 | Report | Score by quarters: 1–1, 6–4, 3–4, 0–1 | | | Polo Natatorio Bruno Bianchi, Trieste; Attendance: 300; Referees: Georgios Stavridis (GRE), Sergio Galindo (ESP) |
| 6 April 2016; 16:30 | Report | Boyd 5 | Goals | Negrean 3 | Polo Natatorio Bruno Bianchi, Trieste; Attendance: 300; Referees: Georgios Stavridis (GRE), Sergio Galindo (ESP) |

| 6 April 2016; 17:50 | Report | Russia | 8–18 | Hungary | Polo Natatorio Bruno Bianchi, Trieste; Attendance: 300; Referees: Vojin Putniković (SRB), Dion Willis (RSA) |
| 6 April 2016; 17:50 | Report | Score by quarters: 2–6, 3–5, 1–4, 2–3 | | | Polo Natatorio Bruno Bianchi, Trieste; Attendance: 300; Referees: Vojin Putniković (SRB), Dion Willis (RSA) |
| 6 April 2016; 17:50 | Report | Kharkov 4 | Goals | four players 3 | Polo Natatorio Bruno Bianchi, Trieste; Attendance: 300; Referees: Vojin Putniković (SRB), Dion Willis (RSA) |

| 6 April 2016; 19:10 | Report | Slovakia | 8–10 | France | Polo Natatorio Bruno Bianchi, Trieste; Attendance: 700; Referees: Filippo Gomez (ITA), Viktor Salnichenko (KAZ) |
| 6 April 2016; 19:10 | Report | Score by quarters: 2–0, 2–4, 3–4, 1–2 | | | Polo Natatorio Bruno Bianchi, Trieste; Attendance: 700; Referees: Filippo Gomez (ITA), Viktor Salnichenko (KAZ) |
| 6 April 2016; 19:10 | Report | Ďurík, Úradník 2 | Goals | Blary, Crousillat 3 | Polo Natatorio Bruno Bianchi, Trieste; Attendance: 700; Referees: Filippo Gomez (ITA), Viktor Salnichenko (KAZ) |

| 7 April 2016; 13:50 | Report | France | 5–13 | Canada | Polo Natatorio Bruno Bianchi, Trieste; Referees: Filippo Gomez (ITA), Vojin Putniković (SRB) |
| 7 April 2016; 13:50 | Report | Score by quarters: 0–1, 1–2, 2–4, 2–6 | | | Polo Natatorio Bruno Bianchi, Trieste; Referees: Filippo Gomez (ITA), Vojin Putniković (SRB) |
| 7 April 2016; 13:50 | Report | Crousillat 2 | Goals | Lapins 4 | Polo Natatorio Bruno Bianchi, Trieste; Referees: Filippo Gomez (ITA), Vojin Putniković (SRB) |

| 7 April 2016; 15:10 | Report | Hungary | 16–7 | Slovakia | Polo Natatorio Bruno Bianchi, Trieste; Referees: Henk Smit (NED), Viktor Salnichenko (KAZ) |
| 7 April 2016; 15:10 | Report | Score by quarters: 5–4, 5–1, 2–1, 4–1 | | | Polo Natatorio Bruno Bianchi, Trieste; Referees: Henk Smit (NED), Viktor Salnichenko (KAZ) |
| 7 April 2016; 15:10 | Report | Dá. Varga 4 | Goals | Kolárik 2 | Polo Natatorio Bruno Bianchi, Trieste; Referees: Henk Smit (NED), Viktor Salnichenko (KAZ) |

| 7 April 2016; 16:30 | Report | Russia | 8–8 | Romania | Polo Natatorio Bruno Bianchi, Trieste; Attendance: 300; Referees: Gernot Häntschel (GER), Georgios Stavridis (GRE) |
| 7 April 2016; 16:30 | Report | Score by quarters: 3–1, 1–3, 3–3, 1–1 | | | Polo Natatorio Bruno Bianchi, Trieste; Attendance: 300; Referees: Gernot Häntschel (GER), Georgios Stavridis (GRE) |
| 7 April 2016; 16:30 | Report | Khalturin 3 | Goals | Goanță 3 | Polo Natatorio Bruno Bianchi, Trieste; Attendance: 300; Referees: Gernot Häntschel (GER), Georgios Stavridis (GRE) |

=== Group B ===
| Pos | Team | Pld | W | D | L | GF | GA | GD | Pts | Qualification |
|---|---|---|---|---|---|---|---|---|---|---|
| 1 | Italy (H) | 5 | 4 | 0 | 1 | 67 | 26 | +41 | 8 | Advanced to quarterfinals |
| 2 | Netherlands | 5 | 4 | 0 | 1 | 46 | 36 | +10 | 8 | Advanced to quarterfinals |
| 3 | Spain | 5 | 4 | 0 | 1 | 55 | 25 | +30 | 8 | Advanced to quarterfinals |
| 4 | Germany | 5 | 1 | 1 | 3 | 53 | 46 | +7 | 3 | Advanced to quarterfinals |
| 5 | Kazakhstan | 5 | 1 | 1 | 3 | 34 | 55 | −21 | 3 | |
| 6 | South Africa | 5 | 0 | 0 | 5 | 21 | 88 | −67 | 0 | |

Source: FINA
Rules for classification: 1) points; 2) head-to-head points; 3) head-to-head goal difference; 4) head-to-head number of goals scored; 5) goal difference.
(H) Hosts

| 3 April 2016; 17:50 | Report | Spain | 5–7 | Netherlands | Polo Natatorio Bruno Bianchi, Trieste; Attendance: 300; Referees: Joe Peila (USA), Balázs Székely (HUN) |
| 3 April 2016; 17:50 | Report | Score by quarters: 3–2, 0–2, 0–2, 2–1 | | | Polo Natatorio Bruno Bianchi, Trieste; Attendance: 300; Referees: Joe Peila (USA), Balázs Székely (HUN) |
| 3 April 2016; 17:50 | Report | Munarriz 2 | Goals | Lindhout, Spijker 2 | Polo Natatorio Bruno Bianchi, Trieste; Attendance: 300; Referees: Joe Peila (USA), Balázs Székely (HUN) |

| 3 April 2016; 19:10 | Report | South Africa | 4–23 | Germany | Polo Natatorio Bruno Bianchi, Trieste; Attendance: 400; Referees: Doriel Terpenka (CAN), Pascal Bouchez (FRA) |
| 3 April 2016; 19:10 | Report | Score by quarters: 0–6, 2–4, 1–8, 1–5 | | | Polo Natatorio Bruno Bianchi, Trieste; Attendance: 400; Referees: Doriel Terpenka (CAN), Pascal Bouchez (FRA) |
| 3 April 2016; 19:10 | Report | four players 1 | Goals | Bukowski, Preuss 4 | Polo Natatorio Bruno Bianchi, Trieste; Attendance: 400; Referees: Doriel Terpenka (CAN), Pascal Bouchez (FRA) |

| 3 April 2016; 20:30 | Report | Italy | 14–3 | Kazakhstan | Polo Natatorio Bruno Bianchi, Trieste; Attendance: 900; Referees: Vojin Putniković (SRB), Sergey Naumov (RUS) |
| 3 April 2016; 20:30 | Report | Score by quarters: 4–1, 3–0, 4–1, 3–1 | | | Polo Natatorio Bruno Bianchi, Trieste; Attendance: 900; Referees: Vojin Putniković (SRB), Sergey Naumov (RUS) |
| 3 April 2016; 20:30 | Report | Nora 4 | Goals | three players 1 | Polo Natatorio Bruno Bianchi, Trieste; Attendance: 900; Referees: Vojin Putniković (SRB), Sergey Naumov (RUS) |

| 4 April 2016; 13:50 | Report | Kazakhstan | 5–8 | Netherlands | Polo Natatorio Bruno Bianchi, Trieste; Attendance: 100; Referees: Adrian Alexandrescu (ROU), Doriel Terpenka (CAN) |
| 4 April 2016; 13:50 | Report | Score by quarters: 0–3, 2–2, 2–2, 1–1 | | | Polo Natatorio Bruno Bianchi, Trieste; Attendance: 100; Referees: Adrian Alexandrescu (ROU), Doriel Terpenka (CAN) |
| 4 April 2016; 13:50 | Report | Shmider 2 | Goals | Gielen, Lindhout 3 | Polo Natatorio Bruno Bianchi, Trieste; Attendance: 100; Referees: Adrian Alexandrescu (ROU), Doriel Terpenka (CAN) |

| 4 April 2016; 15:10 | Report | Germany | 5–10 | Spain | Polo Natatorio Bruno Bianchi, Trieste; Attendance: 200; Referees: Balázs Székely (HUN), Sergey Naumov (RUS) |
| 4 April 2016; 15:10 | Report | Score by quarters: 1–1, 1–0, 2–4, 1–5 | | | Polo Natatorio Bruno Bianchi, Trieste; Attendance: 200; Referees: Balázs Székely (HUN), Sergey Naumov (RUS) |
| 4 April 2016; 15:10 | Report | Nossek, Real 2 | Goals | Molina 4 | Polo Natatorio Bruno Bianchi, Trieste; Attendance: 200; Referees: Balázs Székely (HUN), Sergey Naumov (RUS) |

| 4 April 2016; 20:30 | Report | Italy | 22–3 | South Africa | Polo Natatorio Bruno Bianchi, Trieste; Attendance: 800; Referees: Radosław Koryzna (POL), Pascal Bouchez (FRA) |
| 4 April 2016; 20:30 | Report | Score by quarters: 5–1, 6–0, 7–1, 4–1 | | | Polo Natatorio Bruno Bianchi, Trieste; Attendance: 800; Referees: Radosław Koryzna (POL), Pascal Bouchez (FRA) |
| 4 April 2016; 20:30 | Report | Velotto 4 | Goals | three players 1 | Polo Natatorio Bruno Bianchi, Trieste; Attendance: 800; Referees: Radosław Koryzna (POL), Pascal Bouchez (FRA) |

| 5 April 2016; 17:50 | Report | Netherlands | 9–8 | Germany | Polo Natatorio Bruno Bianchi, Trieste; Attendance: 350; Referees: Adrian Alexandrescu (ROU), Sergey Naumov (RUS) |
| 5 April 2016; 17:50 | Report | Score by quarters: 2–1, 2–2, 3–3, 2–2 | | | Polo Natatorio Bruno Bianchi, Trieste; Attendance: 350; Referees: Adrian Alexandrescu (ROU), Sergey Naumov (RUS) |
| 5 April 2016; 17:50 | Report | three players 2 | Goals | Nossek 2 | Polo Natatorio Bruno Bianchi, Trieste; Attendance: 350; Referees: Adrian Alexandrescu (ROU), Sergey Naumov (RUS) |

| 5 April 2016; 19:10 | Report | South Africa | 6–11 | Kazakhstan | Polo Natatorio Bruno Bianchi, Trieste; Attendance: 400; Referees: Doriel Terpenka (CAN), Balázs Székely (HUN) |
| 5 April 2016; 19:10 | Report | Score by quarters: 3–2, 2–3, 1–4, 0–2 | | | Polo Natatorio Bruno Bianchi, Trieste; Attendance: 400; Referees: Doriel Terpenka (CAN), Balázs Székely (HUN) |
| 5 April 2016; 19:10 | Report | Evezard 2 | Goals | Peković 4 | Polo Natatorio Bruno Bianchi, Trieste; Attendance: 400; Referees: Doriel Terpenka (CAN), Balázs Székely (HUN) |

| 5 April 2016; 20:30 | Report | Spain | 9–8 | Italy | Polo Natatorio Bruno Bianchi, Trieste; Attendance: 1,200; Referees: Vojin Putniković (SRB), Georgios Stavridis (GRE) |
| 5 April 2016; 20:30 | Report | Score by quarters: 4–1, 2–2, 1–3, 2–2 | | | Polo Natatorio Bruno Bianchi, Trieste; Attendance: 1,200; Referees: Vojin Putniković (SRB), Georgios Stavridis (GRE) |
| 5 April 2016; 20:30 | Report | Molina 3 | Goals | Di Fulvio 3 | Polo Natatorio Bruno Bianchi, Trieste; Attendance: 1,200; Referees: Vojin Putniković (SRB), Georgios Stavridis (GRE) |

| 6 April 2016; 13:50 | Report | Kazakhstan | 11–11 | Germany | Polo Natatorio Bruno Bianchi, Trieste; Referees: Joe Peila (USA), Balázs Székely (HUN) |
| 6 April 2016; 13:50 | Report | Score by quarters: 2–2, 3–3, 4–2, 2–4 | | | Polo Natatorio Bruno Bianchi, Trieste; Referees: Joe Peila (USA), Balázs Székely (HUN) |
| 6 April 2016; 13:50 | Report | Ushakov 3 | Goals | Cuk 4 | Polo Natatorio Bruno Bianchi, Trieste; Referees: Joe Peila (USA), Balázs Székely (HUN) |

| 6 April 2016; 15:10 | Report | South Africa | 1–15 | Spain | Polo Natatorio Bruno Bianchi, Trieste; Referees: Doriel Terpenka (CAN), Sergey Naumov (RUS) |
| 6 April 2016; 15:10 | Report | Score by quarters: 1–3, 0–6, 0–4, 0–2 | | | Polo Natatorio Bruno Bianchi, Trieste; Referees: Doriel Terpenka (CAN), Sergey Naumov (RUS) |
| 6 April 2016; 15:10 | Report | Rumbelow 1 | Goals | Molina 5 | Polo Natatorio Bruno Bianchi, Trieste; Referees: Doriel Terpenka (CAN), Sergey Naumov (RUS) |

| 6 April 2016; 20:30 | Report | Italy | 11–5 | Netherlands | Polo Natatorio Bruno Bianchi, Trieste; Attendance: 1,000; Referees: Radosław Koryzna (POL), Adrian Alexandrescu (ROU) |
| 6 April 2016; 20:30 | Report | Score by quarters: 3–1, 5–3, 2–0, 1–1 | | | Polo Natatorio Bruno Bianchi, Trieste; Attendance: 1,000; Referees: Radosław Koryzna (POL), Adrian Alexandrescu (ROU) |
| 6 April 2016; 20:30 | Report | Figlioli 4 | Goals | Lindhout 3 | Polo Natatorio Bruno Bianchi, Trieste; Attendance: 1,000; Referees: Radosław Koryzna (POL), Adrian Alexandrescu (ROU) |

| 7 April 2016; 17:50 | Report | Spain | 16–4 | Kazakhstan | Polo Natatorio Bruno Bianchi, Trieste; Referees: Pascal Bouchez (FRA), Radosław Koryzna (POL) |
| 7 April 2016; 17:50 | Report | Score by quarters: 3–2, 3–1, 7–0, 3–1 | | | Polo Natatorio Bruno Bianchi, Trieste; Referees: Pascal Bouchez (FRA), Radosław Koryzna (POL) |
| 7 April 2016; 17:50 | Report | Echenique 4 | Goals | Gubarev 2 | Polo Natatorio Bruno Bianchi, Trieste; Referees: Pascal Bouchez (FRA), Radosław Koryzna (POL) |

| 7 April 2016; 19:10 | Report | Netherlands | 17–7 | South Africa | Polo Natatorio Bruno Bianchi, Trieste; Attendance: 600; Referees: Sergey Naumov (RUS), Balázs Székely (HUN) |
| 7 April 2016; 19:10 | Report | Score by quarters: 4–2, 3–3, 4–0, 6–2 | | | Polo Natatorio Bruno Bianchi, Trieste; Attendance: 600; Referees: Sergey Naumov (RUS), Balázs Székely (HUN) |
| 7 April 2016; 19:10 | Report | Lindhout 4 | Goals | Brown 2 | Polo Natatorio Bruno Bianchi, Trieste; Attendance: 600; Referees: Sergey Naumov (RUS), Balázs Székely (HUN) |

| 7 April 2016; 20:30 | Report | Italy | 12–6 | Germany | Polo Natatorio Bruno Bianchi, Trieste; Attendance: 1,100; Referees: Doriel Terpenka (CAN), Joe Peila (USA) |
| 7 April 2016; 20:30 | Report | Score by quarters: 1–1, 4–1, 4–1, 3–3 | | | Polo Natatorio Bruno Bianchi, Trieste; Attendance: 1,100; Referees: Doriel Terpenka (CAN), Joe Peila (USA) |
| 7 April 2016; 20:30 | Report | Figlioli 4 | Goals | Cuk, Stamm 2 | Polo Natatorio Bruno Bianchi, Trieste; Attendance: 1,100; Referees: Doriel Terpenka (CAN), Joe Peila (USA) |

== Knockout stage ==
All times are local (UTC+2).

=== Bracket ===
Quarterfinals
Hungary | 8
Germany | 7
France (pen.) | 8 (4)
Netherlands | 8 (3)
Canada | 7
Spain | 8
Romania | 7
Italy | 8

Semifinals
Hungary | 15
France | 9
Spain | 5
Italy | 6

Final
Hungary | 10
Italy | 8
Third place
France | 4
Spain | 16

5th place bracket

Semifinals
Germany | 7
Netherlands | 8
Canada | 14
Romania | 7

Fifth place
Netherlands | 9
Canada | 8
Seventh place
Germany | 9
Romania | 10

=== Quarterfinals ===
The winners qualify for the 2016 Olympics.

| 8 April 2016; 16:00 | Report | Hungary | 8–7 | Germany | Polo Natatorio Bruno Bianchi, Trieste; Attendance: 400; Referees: Joe Peila (USA), Adrian Alexandrescu (ROU) |
| 8 April 2016; 16:00 | Report | Score by quarters: 1–0, 4–2, 2–1, 1–4 | | | Polo Natatorio Bruno Bianchi, Trieste; Attendance: 400; Referees: Joe Peila (USA), Adrian Alexandrescu (ROU) |
| 8 April 2016; 16:00 | Report | Dé. Varga 3 | Goals | Bukowski, Nossek 2 | Polo Natatorio Bruno Bianchi, Trieste; Attendance: 400; Referees: Joe Peila (USA), Adrian Alexandrescu (ROU) |

| 8 April 2016; 17:30 | Report | Canada | 7–8 | Spain | Polo Natatorio Bruno Bianchi, Trieste; Attendance: 1,000; Referees: Vojin Putniković (SRB), Balázs Székely (HUN) |
| 8 April 2016; 17:30 | Report | Score by quarters: 1–2, 2–2, 0–3, 4–1 | | | Polo Natatorio Bruno Bianchi, Trieste; Attendance: 1,000; Referees: Vojin Putniković (SRB), Balázs Székely (HUN) |
| 8 April 2016; 17:30 | Report | Boyd, McElroy 2 | Goals | Molina 3 | Polo Natatorio Bruno Bianchi, Trieste; Attendance: 1,000; Referees: Vojin Putniković (SRB), Balázs Székely (HUN) |

| 8 April 2016; 19:00 | Report | France | 8–8 | Netherlands | Polo Natatorio Bruno Bianchi, Trieste; Attendance: 600; Referees: Radosław Koryzna (POL), Filippo Gomez (ITA) |
| 8 April 2016; 19:00 | Report | Score by quarters: 1–3, 2–1, 2–2, 3–2 PSO: 4–3 | | | Polo Natatorio Bruno Bianchi, Trieste; Attendance: 600; Referees: Radosław Koryzna (POL), Filippo Gomez (ITA) |
| 8 April 2016; 19:00 | Report | Camarasa 3 | Goals | three players 2 | Polo Natatorio Bruno Bianchi, Trieste; Attendance: 600; Referees: Radosław Koryzna (POL), Filippo Gomez (ITA) |

| 8 April 2016; 20:30 | Report | Romania | 7–8 | Italy | Polo Natatorio Bruno Bianchi, Trieste; Attendance: 1,500; Referees: Georgios Stavridis (GRE), Sergey Naumov (RUS) |
| 8 April 2016; 20:30 | Report | Score by quarters: 0–2, 3–2, 3–3, 1–1 | | | Polo Natatorio Bruno Bianchi, Trieste; Attendance: 1,500; Referees: Georgios Stavridis (GRE), Sergey Naumov (RUS) |
| 8 April 2016; 20:30 | Report | Gheorghe 3 | Goals | Di Fulvio, Figlioli 2 | Polo Natatorio Bruno Bianchi, Trieste; Attendance: 1,500; Referees: Georgios Stavridis (GRE), Sergey Naumov (RUS) |

=== 5–8th place semifinals ===
| 9 April 2016; 16:00 | Report | Germany | 7–8 | Netherlands | Polo Natatorio Bruno Bianchi, Trieste; Referees: Pascal Bouchez (FRA), Viktor Salnichenko (KAZ) |
| 9 April 2016; 16:00 | Report | Score by quarters: 2–1, 3–0, 2–3, 0–4 | | | Polo Natatorio Bruno Bianchi, Trieste; Referees: Pascal Bouchez (FRA), Viktor Salnichenko (KAZ) |
| 9 April 2016; 16:00 | Report | Jüngling 3 | Goals | three players 2 | Polo Natatorio Bruno Bianchi, Trieste; Referees: Pascal Bouchez (FRA), Viktor Salnichenko (KAZ) |

| 9 April 2016; 17:30 | Report | Canada | 14–7 | Romania | Polo Natatorio Bruno Bianchi, Trieste; Referees: Vojin Putniković (SRB), Sergio Galindo (ESP) |
| 9 April 2016; 17:30 | Report | Score by quarters: 5–3, 4–0, 2–1, 3–3 | | | Polo Natatorio Bruno Bianchi, Trieste; Referees: Vojin Putniković (SRB), Sergio Galindo (ESP) |
| 9 April 2016; 17:30 | Report | Boyd, Constantin-Bicari 4 | Goals | Gheorghe 3 | Polo Natatorio Bruno Bianchi, Trieste; Referees: Vojin Putniković (SRB), Sergio Galindo (ESP) |

=== Semifinals ===
| 9 April 2016; 19:00 | Report | Hungary | 15–9 | France | Polo Natatorio Bruno Bianchi, Trieste; Attendance: 800; Referees: Adrian Alexandrescu (ROU), Dion Willis (RSA) |
| 9 April 2016; 19:00 | Report | Score by quarters: 4–2, 4–4, 2–1, 5–2 | | | Polo Natatorio Bruno Bianchi, Trieste; Attendance: 800; Referees: Adrian Alexandrescu (ROU), Dion Willis (RSA) |
| 9 April 2016; 19:00 | Report | Vámos 4 | Goals | four players 2 | Polo Natatorio Bruno Bianchi, Trieste; Attendance: 800; Referees: Adrian Alexandrescu (ROU), Dion Willis (RSA) |

| 9 April 2016; 20:30 | Report | Spain | 5–6 | Italy | Polo Natatorio Bruno Bianchi, Trieste; Attendance: 1,500; Referees: Joe Peila (USA), Gernot Häntschel (GER) |
| 9 April 2016; 20:30 | Report | Score by quarters: 1–0, 0–1, 2–1, 2–4 | | | Polo Natatorio Bruno Bianchi, Trieste; Attendance: 1,500; Referees: Joe Peila (USA), Gernot Häntschel (GER) |
| 9 April 2016; 20:30 | Report | Español, Mallarach 2 | Goals | Nora 2 | Polo Natatorio Bruno Bianchi, Trieste; Attendance: 1,500; Referees: Joe Peila (USA), Gernot Häntschel (GER) |

=== Seventh place game ===
| 10 April 2016; 11:00 | Report | Germany | 9–10 | Romania | Polo Natatorio Bruno Bianchi, Trieste; Referees: Henk Smit (NED), Doriel Terpenka (CAN) |
| 10 April 2016; 11:00 | Report | Score by quarters: 2–3, 2–2, 1–3, 4–2 | | | Polo Natatorio Bruno Bianchi, Trieste; Referees: Henk Smit (NED), Doriel Terpenka (CAN) |
| 10 April 2016; 11:00 | Report | three players 2 | Goals | Radu 3 | Polo Natatorio Bruno Bianchi, Trieste; Referees: Henk Smit (NED), Doriel Terpenka (CAN) |

=== Fifth place game ===
| 10 April 2016; 12:30 | Report | Netherlands | 9–8 | Canada | Polo Natatorio Bruno Bianchi, Trieste; Referees: Filippo Gomez (ITA), Dion Willis (RSA) |
| 10 April 2016; 12:30 | Report | Score by quarters: 1–2, 2–2, 4–3, 2–1 | | | Polo Natatorio Bruno Bianchi, Trieste; Referees: Filippo Gomez (ITA), Dion Willis (RSA) |
| 10 April 2016; 12:30 | Report | Lindhout 4 | Goals | Conway 3 | Polo Natatorio Bruno Bianchi, Trieste; Referees: Filippo Gomez (ITA), Dion Willis (RSA) |

=== Third place game ===
| 10 April 2016; 15:30 | Report | France | 4–16 | Spain | Polo Natatorio Bruno Bianchi, Trieste; Referees: Adrian Alexandrescu (ROU), Sergey Naumov (RUS) |
| 10 April 2016; 15:30 | Report | Score by quarters: 1–4, 2–5, 0–4, 1–3 | | | Polo Natatorio Bruno Bianchi, Trieste; Referees: Adrian Alexandrescu (ROU), Sergey Naumov (RUS) |
| 10 April 2016; 15:30 | Report | four players 1 | Goals | Tahull 5 | Polo Natatorio Bruno Bianchi, Trieste; Referees: Adrian Alexandrescu (ROU), Sergey Naumov (RUS) |

=== Final ===
| 10 April 2016; 17:00 | Report | Hungary | 10–8 | Italy | Polo Natatorio Bruno Bianchi, Trieste; Attendance: 1,500; Referees: Georgios Stavridis (GRE), Radosław Koryzna (POL) |
| 10 April 2016; 17:00 | Report | Score by quarters: 2–3, 4–2, 3–1, 1–2 | | | Polo Natatorio Bruno Bianchi, Trieste; Attendance: 1,500; Referees: Georgios Stavridis (GRE), Radosław Koryzna (POL) |
| 10 April 2016; 17:00 | Report | Dé. Varga 3 | Goals | Aicardi, Di Fulvio 2 | Polo Natatorio Bruno Bianchi, Trieste; Attendance: 1,500; Referees: Georgios Stavridis (GRE), Radosław Koryzna (POL) |

== Final ranking ==
| Qualified for the Summer Olympics |

| Rank | Team |
|---|---|
| Gold medal | Hungary |
| Silver medal | Italy |
| Bronze medal | Spain |
| 4 | France |
| 5 | Netherlands |
| 6 | Canada |
| 7 | Romania |
| 8 | Germany |
| 9 | Russia |
| 10 | Kazakhstan |
| 11 | Slovakia |
| 12 | South Africa |

== See also ==
- 2016 Women's Water Polo Olympic Games Qualification Tournament
