= Rurua =

Rurua (Georgian: რურუა) is a Georgian surname. Notable people with the surname include:

- Nika Rurua (born 1968), Georgian politician
- Roman Rurua (born 1942), Georgian wrestler
- Zurab Rurua (born 1987), Georgian water polo player
