= Malta men's national water polo team =

Malta
- FINA code: MLT
- Association: Aquatic Sports Association of Malta
- Confederation: LEN (Europe)
- Head coach: Milan Ćirović
- Asst coach: Jonathan Valletta
- Captain: Steven Camilleri

FINA ranking (since 2008)
- Current: 19 (as of 9 August 2021)

Olympic Games
- Appearances: 2 (first in 1928)
- Best result: Quarter-finals (1928)

European Championship
- Appearances: 6 (first in 2016)
- Best result: 13th place (2026)

The Malta men's national water polo team is the representative for Malta in international men's water polo.

== Results ==
=== Olympic Games ===
- 1928 – Quarterfinals
- 1936 – First round

=== European Championship ===
- 2016 – 15th place
- 2018 – 16th place
- 2020 – 16th place
- 2022 – 14th place
- 2024 – 15th place
- 2026 – 13th place

== Team ==
=== Current squad ===
Roster for the 2026 Men's European Water Polo Championship.

Head coach: (Montenegro) Milan Ćirović

Name	Date of birth	Pos.	Club
Jake Tanti	12 June 1998 (age 28)	GK	(Spain) CN Mataro
Ivan Nagaev	30 November 1993 (age 32)	W	(Croatia) HAVK Mladost
Liam Galea	28 November 2001 (age 24)	DF	(Malta) Sliema ASC
Ben Plumpton	16 February 1998 (age 28)	DF	(Malta) San Giljian ASC
Benjamin Cachia	12 February 2002 (age 24)	DF	(Malta) Sliema ASC
Matthew Zammit	1 October 1987 (age 39)	CF	(Malta) San Giljian ASC
Stevie Camilleri (C)	4 July 1987 (age 39)	W	(Malta) Neptunes WPSC
Jayden Cutajar	22 August 2007 (age 19)	W	(Serbia) VK Partizan
Jake Muscat	8 February 2003 (age 23)	W	(Italy) Telimar Palermo
Nikolai Zammit	19 April 2001 (age 25)	W	(Malta) San Giljian ASC
Darren Zammit	1 January 1999 (age 27)	GK	(Malta) San Giljian ASC
Alec Fenech	8 November 2005 (age 20)	W	(Romania) CSA Steaua București
Nicholas Grixti	13 October 1995 (age 31)	GK	(Malta) Sirens ASC
Elijah Schembri	24 February 2006 (age 20)	DF	(Malta) Sliema ASC
Jake Bonavia	23 March 2003 (age 23)	W	(Malta) San Giljian ASC

=== Notable players ===
- Stevie Camilleri – best scorer at the 2016 European Championship
