= Mikheil Baghaturia =

Georgian water polo player

Personal information
- Nationality: Georgian
- Born: 9 May 1987 (age 39)
- Height: 1.83 m (6 ft 0 in)
- Weight: 85 kg (187 lb)

Sport
- Sport: Water polo
- Handedness: Right
- Position: Wing
- Current club: Dinamo Tbilisi

Senior clubs
- Years: Team
- Dinamo Tbilisi
National team
- Years: Team
- (Georgia (country)) Georgia

Mikheil Baghaturia (born 9 May 1987) is a Georgian water polo player for Dinamo Tbilisi and the Georgian national team.

He participated at the 2018 Men's European Water Polo Championship.
