= Damir Crepulja =

Montenegrin water polo player

Personal information
- Nationality: Georgian
- Born: 16 January 1984 (age 42) Montenegro
- Height: 6 ft 3 in (1.91 m)
- Weight: 245 lb (111 kg)

Sport
- Country: Georgia
- Sport: Water polo
- Club: VK Primorac Kotor; Georgia men's national water polo team

Damir Crepulja (Damir Tsrepulia) (born 16 January 1984) is a Georgian professional water polo player. He is currently playing for Georgia men's national water polo team. He is 6 ft 3 in (1.91 m) tall and weighs 245 lb (111 kg).
