= Zurab Rurua =

Georgian water polo player

Personal information
- Nationality: Georgian
- Born: 8 June 1987 (age 39)
- Height: 1.86 m (6 ft 1 in)
- Weight: 87 kg (192 lb)

Sport
- Sport: Water polo
- Handedness: Right
- Position: Wing
- Current club: Dinamo Tbilisi

Zurab Rurua (born 8 June 1987) is a Georgian water polo player for Dinamo Tbilisi and the Georgian national team.

He participated at the 2018 Men's European Water Polo Championship.
