= Heiko Nossek =

German water polo player

Personal information
- Born: March 14, 1982 (age 43); Esslingen, West Germany

Sport
- Sport: Water polo

Heiko Nossek (born 14 March 1982) is a German water polo player who competed in the 2004 Summer Olympics and in the 2008 Summer Olympics. He played for various teams in Europe. For the 2006-07 season, Nossek played for Greek traditional club, Ethnikos.
