= Stevie Camilleri =

Maltese water polo player

Personal information
- Born: Malta

Sport
- Sport: Water polo

Stevie Camilleri is a Maltese water polo player for Neptunes.

Camilleri has been playing regularly with the Neptunes WPSC first team since he was 15 years old. At international level, he also stood out for Malta several times, most notably in July 2007, finishing in the 3rd position of the top-scorers list of the European 'B' championships held in Manchester. He also won the award of best Maltese First Division player three times. He can play in every position but he is best when playing at the 4m position because he has a deadly shot and can feed his teammates well since he is a player with great vision. He also had some great games in 2006 when he scored two goals in a game although being marked by three-time world best player Tibor Benedek.

In winter 2007–2008, he went on a six-month loan deal to Serbian squad VK Partizan with the recommendation of Vladimir Vujasinovic. After the loan, he improved tremendously and he impressed all the VK Partizan staff but due to the limit of foreign players in the Serbian league, the club couldn't hold on to him. In winter 2008–2009 he joined Italian club Rari Nantes Bogliasco. Vujasinovic again recommended Camilleri to Rari Nantes Bogliasco and the team also were in touch with Neptunes WPSC coach Sergio Afric to get more detailed information about Camilleri.
