= Alexandre Camarasa =

French water polo player (born 1987)

Personal information
- Born: 10 June 1987 (age 39) Marseille, France
- Height: 1.93 m (6 ft 4 in)
- Weight: 100 kg (220 lb)

Sport
- Country: France
- Sport: Water polo

Alexandre Camarasa (born 10 June 1987) is a French water polo player. He competed in the men's tournament at the 2016 Summer Olympics.
