= Tiberiu Negrean =

Romanian water polo player

Personal information
- Nationality: Romanian
- Born: 1 September 1988 (age 38) Cluj-Napoca, Romania
- Height: 187 cm (74 in)
- Weight: 93 kg (205 lb)

Sport
- Sport: Water polo
- Current club: CSM Digi Oradea
- Number: 3
National team
- Years: Team
- 2005-2019: Romania

Tiberiu Negrean (born 1 September 1988 in Cluj-Napoca) is a Romanian water polo player. At the 2012 Summer Olympics, he competed for the Romania men's national water polo team in the men's event. He is 6 ft 2 inches tall.
