= 2025 Men's European U-16 Water Polo Championship Division I =

Youth men's water polo tournament

Tournament details
- Host country: Slovenia
- City: Ljubljana
- Venue: 1 (in 1 host city)
- Dates: 7–13 July 2025
- Teams: 12 (from 1 confederation)

Final positions
- Champions: France (1st title)
- Runners-up: Bulgaria
- Third place: Bosnia and Herzegovina
- Fourth place: Ukraine

Official website
- European Aquatics

The 2025 Men's European U-16 Water Polo Championship Division I was the inaugural edition of the second tier of the Men's European U-16 Water Polo Championships, organized by the European Aquatics. The tournament was played in Ljubljana, Slovenia, from 7 to 13 July 2025.

France won the tournament and, along with second-placed Bulgaria, promoted to the 2027 Elite Division.

== Participating teams ==
Teams that have registered their U16 national team but didn't compete in the 2023 U15 European Championship took part in the tournament.

Teams
Bosnia and Herzegovina
Bulgaria
Cyprus
Czech Republic
France
Latvia
Lithuania
Portugal
Slovakia
Slovenia
Switzerland
Ukraine

== Group stage ==
All times are local (Central European Summer Time; UTC+2).

=== Group A ===
Pos	Team	Pld	W	PSW	PSL	L	GF	GA	GD	Pts	Qualification
1	Bulgaria	5	5	0	0	0	70	51	+19	15	Semifinals
2	France	5	4	0	0	1	81	56	+25	12	Semifinals
3	Slovenia (H)	5	3	0	0	2	77	71	+6	9	5th–8th place playoffs
4	Cyprus	5	2	0	0	3	64	64	0	6	5th–8th place playoffs
5	Slovakia	5	1	0	0	4	66	84	−18	3	9th–12th place playoffs
6	Portugal	5	0	0	0	5	55	87	−32	0	9th–12th place playoffs

Source: microplustimingservices.com
(H) Host

7 July 2025; 9:00	Report	Bulgaria	15–9	Slovakia	Ilirija Sports Center, Ljubljana
7 July 2025; 9:00	Report	Score by quarters: 3–3, 4–4, 3–1, 5–1			Ilirija Sports Center, Ljubljana

7 July 2025; 13:00	Report	France	17–11	Portugal	Ilirija Sports Center, Ljubljana
7 July 2025; 13:00	Report	Score by quarters: 3–3, 7–4, 3–3, 4–1			Ilirija Sports Center, Ljubljana

7 July 2025; 19:30	Report	Slovenia	14–12	Cyprus	Ilirija Sports Center, Ljubljana
7 July 2025; 19:30	Report	Score by quarters: 4–2, 3–2, 5–5, 2–3			Ilirija Sports Center, Ljubljana

8 July 2025; 11:00	Report	Portugal	14–18	Slovakia	Ilirija Sports Center, Ljubljana
8 July 2025; 11:00	Report	Score by quarters: 2–5, 2–4, 4–7, 6–2			Ilirija Sports Center, Ljubljana

8 July 2025; 15:00	Report	Cyprus	11–18	France	Ilirija Sports Center, Ljubljana
8 July 2025; 15:00	Report	Score by quarters: 2–5, 4–2, 3–5, 2–6			Ilirija Sports Center, Ljubljana

8 July 2025; 19:00	Report	Bulgaria	15–14	Slovenia	Ilirija Sports Center, Ljubljana
8 July 2025; 19:00	Report	Score by quarters: 2–2, 4–3, 6–4, 3–5			Ilirija Sports Center, Ljubljana

9 July 2025; 9:00	Report	Portugal	6–17	Cyprus	Ilirija Sports Center, Ljubljana
9 July 2025; 9:00	Report	Score by quarters: 3–1, 0–6, 2–4, 1–6			Ilirija Sports Center, Ljubljana

9 July 2025; 17:00	Report	France	9–10	Bulgaria	Ilirija Sports Center, Ljubljana
9 July 2025; 17:00	Report	Score by quarters: 3–2, 1–1, 3–4, 2–3			Ilirija Sports Center, Ljubljana

9 July 2025; 19:00	Report	Slovakia	16–17	Slovenia	Ilirija Sports Center, Ljubljana
9 July 2025; 19:00	Report	Score by quarters: 3–4, 5–4, 5–6, 3–3			Ilirija Sports Center, Ljubljana

10 July 2025; 11:00	Report	Cyprus	15–10	Slovakia	Ilirija Sports Center, Ljubljana
10 July 2025; 11:00	Report	Score by quarters: 4–3, 2–2, 6–2, 3–3			Ilirija Sports Center, Ljubljana

10 July 2025; 15:00	Report	Bulgaria	14–10	Portugal	Ilirija Sports Center, Ljubljana
10 July 2025; 15:00	Report	Score by quarters: 2–4, 4–0, 4–5, 4–1			Ilirija Sports Center, Ljubljana

10 July 2025; 19:00	Report	Slovenia	11–14	France	Ilirija Sports Center, Ljubljana
10 July 2025; 19:00	Report	Score by quarters: 5–4, 0–3, 2–5, 4–2			Ilirija Sports Center, Ljubljana

11 July 2025; 9:00	Report	Bulgaria	16–9	Cyprus	Ilirija Sports Center, Ljubljana
11 July 2025; 9:00	Report	Score by quarters: 4–3, 4–3, 2–1, 6–2			Ilirija Sports Center, Ljubljana

11 July 2025; 13:00	Report	France	23–13	Slovakia	Ilirija Sports Center, Ljubljana
11 July 2025; 13:00	Report	Score by quarters: 8–4, 7–2, 3–6, 5–1			Ilirija Sports Center, Ljubljana

11 July 2025; 19:00	Report	Portugal	14–21	Slovenia	Ilirija Sports Center, Ljubljana
11 July 2025; 19:00	Report	Score by quarters: 5–6, 1–4, 3–7, 5–4			Ilirija Sports Center, Ljubljana

=== Group B ===
Pos	Team	Pld	W	PSW	PSL	L	GF	GA	GD	Pts	Qualification
1	Ukraine	5	4	1	0	0	92	39	+53	14	Semifinals
2	Bosnia and Herzegovina	5	4	0	0	1	83	45	+38	12	Semifinals
3	Switzerland	5	3	0	1	1	77	46	+31	10	5th–8th place playoffs
4	Lithuania	5	2	0	0	3	57	50	+7	6	5th–8th place playoffs
5	Czech Republic	5	1	0	0	4	42	61	−19	3	9th–12th place playoffs
6	Latvia	5	0	0	0	5	20	130	−110	0	9th–12th place playoffs

Source: microplustimingservices.com

7 July 2025; 11:00	Report	Czech Republic	9–21	Bosnia and Herzegovina	Ilirija Sports Center, Ljubljana
7 July 2025; 11:00	Report	Score by quarters: 1–3, 3–6, 3–8, 2–4			Ilirija Sports Center, Ljubljana

7 July 2025; 15:00	Report	Ukraine	41–4	Latvia	Ilirija Sports Center, Ljubljana
7 July 2025; 15:00	Report	Score by quarters: 11–0, 8–3, 9–0, 13–1			Ilirija Sports Center, Ljubljana

7 July 2025; 17:00	Report	Switzerland	11–9	Lithuania	Ilirija Sports Center, Ljubljana
7 July 2025; 17:00	Report	Score by quarters: 2–2, 3–3, 4–1, 2–3			Ilirija Sports Center, Ljubljana

8 July 2025; 9:00	Report	Latvia	2–27	Bosnia and Herzegovina	Ilirija Sports Center, Ljubljana
8 July 2025; 9:00	Report	Score by quarters: 0–5, 0–5, 0–8, 2–9			Ilirija Sports Center, Ljubljana

8 July 2025; 13:00	Report	Lithuania	12–13	Ukraine	Ilirija Sports Center, Ljubljana
8 July 2025; 13:00	Report	Score by quarters: 2–3, 6–5, 1–5, 3–0			Ilirija Sports Center, Ljubljana

8 July 2025; 17:00	Report	Czech Republic	9–15	Switzerland	Ilirija Sports Center, Ljubljana
8 July 2025; 17:00	Report	Score by quarters: 2–2, 0–4, 3–3, 4–6			Ilirija Sports Center, Ljubljana

9 July 2025; 11:00	Report	Latvia	4–21	Lithuania	Ilirija Sports Center, Ljubljana
9 July 2025; 11:00	Report	Score by quarters: 1–6, 2–4, 0–4, 1–7			Ilirija Sports Center, Ljubljana

9 July 2025; 13:00	Report	Ukraine	10–4	Czech Republic	Ilirija Sports Center, Ljubljana
9 July 2025; 13:00	Report	Score by quarters: 1–0, 3–3, 3–1, 3–0			Ilirija Sports Center, Ljubljana

9 July 2025; 15:00	Report	Bosnia and Herzegovina	13–11	Switzerland	Ilirija Sports Center, Ljubljana
9 July 2025; 15:00	Report	Score by quarters: 4–2, 1–1, 5–5, 3–3			Ilirija Sports Center, Ljubljana

10 July 2025; 9:00	Report	Lithuania	6–14	Bosnia and Herzegovina	Ilirija Sports Center, Ljubljana
10 July 2025; 9:00	Report	Score by quarters: 2–3, 2–3, 1–5, 1–3			Ilirija Sports Center, Ljubljana

10 July 2025; 13:00	Report	Czech Republic	12–6	Latvia	Ilirija Sports Center, Ljubljana
10 July 2025; 13:00	Report	Score by quarters: 2–2, 4–1, 4–2, 2–1			Ilirija Sports Center, Ljubljana

10 July 2025; 17:00	Report	Switzerland	19–20 (PSO)	Ukraine	Ilirija Sports Center, Ljubljana
10 July 2025; 17:00	Report	Score by quarters: 1–2, 5–4, 2–2, 3–3 PSO: 8–9			Ilirija Sports Center, Ljubljana

11 July 2025; 11:00	Report	Czech Republic	8–9	Lithuania	Ilirija Sports Center, Ljubljana
11 July 2025; 11:00	Report	Score by quarters: 2–2, 2–2, 1–4, 3–1			Ilirija Sports Center, Ljubljana

11 July 2025; 15:00	Report	Ukraine	17–8	Bosnia and Herzegovina	Ilirija Sports Center, Ljubljana
11 July 2025; 15:00	Report	Score by quarters: 6–2, 1–1, 5–2, 5–3			Ilirija Sports Center, Ljubljana

11 July 2025; 17:00	Report	Latvia	4–29	Switzerland	Ilirija Sports Center, Ljubljana
11 July 2025; 17:00	Report	Score by quarters: 0–9, 1–6, 2–6, 1–8			Ilirija Sports Center, Ljubljana

== 9th–12th place playoffs ==
9th–12th place semifinals
12 July
A5 Slovakia	25
B6 Latvia	2
12 July
B5 Czech Republic	11
A6 Portugal	12

Ninth place game
13 July
A5 Slovakia	10
A6 Portugal	11
Eleventh place game
13 July
B6 Latvia	2
B5 Czech Republic	19

=== 9th–12th place semifinals ===
12 July 2025; 9:00	Report	Slovakia	25–2	Latvia	Ilirija Sports Center, Ljubljana
12 July 2025; 9:00	Report	Score by quarters: 4–1, 6–0, 7–1, 8–0			Ilirija Sports Center, Ljubljana

12 July 2025; 11:00	Report	Czech Republic	11–12	Portugal	Ilirija Sports Center, Ljubljana
12 July 2025; 11:00	Report	Score by quarters: 4–5, 3–3, 1–2, 3–2			Ilirija Sports Center, Ljubljana

==== Eleventh place game ====
13 July 2025; 9:00	Report	Latvia	2–19	Czech Republic	Ilirija Sports Center, Ljubljana
13 July 2025; 9:00	Report	Score by quarters: 0–7, 0–2, 0–7, 2–3			Ilirija Sports Center, Ljubljana

==== Ninth place game ====
13 July 2025; 11:00	Report	Slovakia	10–11	Portugal	Ilirija Sports Center, Ljubljana
13 July 2025; 11:00	Report	Score by quarters: 0–3, 2–1, 4–4, 4–3			Ilirija Sports Center, Ljubljana

== 5th–8th place playoffs ==
5th–8th place semifinals
12 July
A3 Slovenia	12
B4 Lithuania	11
12 July
B3 Switzerland	9
A4 Cyprus	7

Fifth place game
13 July
A3 Slovenia	8
B3 Switzerland	9
Seventh place game
13 July
B4 Lithuania	8
A4 Cyprus	13

=== 5th–8th place semifinals ===
12 July 2025; 13:00	Report	Slovenia	12–11	Lithuania	Ilirija Sports Center, Ljubljana
12 July 2025; 13:00	Report	Score by quarters: 3–3, 2–1, 4–4, 3–3			Ilirija Sports Center, Ljubljana

12 July 2025; 15:00	Report	Switzerland	9–7	Cyprus	Ilirija Sports Center, Ljubljana
12 July 2025; 15:00	Report	Score by quarters: 1–2, 3–3, 2–1, 3–1			Ilirija Sports Center, Ljubljana

==== Seventh place game ====
13 July 2025; 13:00	Report	Lithuania	8–13	Cyprus	Ilirija Sports Center, Ljubljana
13 July 2025; 13:00	Report	Score by quarters: 2–2, 2–4, 3–3, 1–4			Ilirija Sports Center, Ljubljana

==== Fifth place game ====
13 July 2025; 15:00	Report	Slovenia	8–9	Switzerland	Ilirija Sports Center, Ljubljana
13 July 2025; 15:00	Report	Score by quarters: 1–1, 5–3, 1–2, 1–3			Ilirija Sports Center, Ljubljana

== Championship playoffs ==
Semifinals
12 July
A1 Bulgaria	11
B2 Bosnia and Herzegovina	8
12 July
B1 Ukraine	9
A2 France	16

Final
13 July
A1 Bulgaria	16
A2 France	17
Third place game
13 July
B2 Bosnia and Herzegovina	13
B1 Ukraine	11

=== Semifinals ===
12 July 2025; 17:00	Report	Bulgaria	11–8	Bosnia and Herzegovina	Ilirija Sports Center, Ljubljana
12 July 2025; 17:00	Report	Score by quarters: 3–0, 3–1, 2–2, 3–5			Ilirija Sports Center, Ljubljana

12 July 2025; 19:00	Report	Ukraine	9–16	France	Ilirija Sports Center, Ljubljana
12 July 2025; 19:00	Report	Score by quarters: 3–4, 1–3, 3–4, 2–5			Ilirija Sports Center, Ljubljana

==== Third place game ====
13 July 2025; 17:00	Report	Bosnia and Herzegovina	13–11 (PSO)	Ukraine	Ilirija Sports Center, Ljubljana
13 July 2025; 17:00	Report	Score by quarters: 3–1, 2–2, 1–4, 3–2 PSO: 4–2			Ilirija Sports Center, Ljubljana

==== Final ====
13 July 2025; 19:00	Report	Bulgaria	16–17 (PSO)	France	Ilirija Sports Center, Ljubljana
13 July 2025; 19:00	Report	Score by quarters: 1–3, 5–2, 4–4, 2–3 PSO: 4–5			Ilirija Sports Center, Ljubljana

== Final standings ==
Rank	Team
1st place, gold medalist(s)	France
2nd place, silver medalist(s)	Bulgaria
3rd place, bronze medalist(s)	Bosnia and Herzegovina
4	Ukraine
5	Switzerland
6	Slovenia
7	Cyprus
8	Lithuania
9	Portugal
10	Slovakia
11	Czech Republic
12	Latvia

Promoted to the 2027 Men's European U-16 Water Polo Championship (Elite)

== See also ==
- 2025 Men's European U-16 Water Polo Championship
- 2025 Women's European U-16 Water Polo Championship
