= 2024 Men's European U-19 Water Polo Championship Qualifiers =

The tournaments for the qualification for the 2024 Men's European U-19 Water Polo Championship was held between 14 and 17 March 2024.

== Format ==
The 19 teams were split into four groups of four or five teams. The tournament was played at a single venue with the group winners and the runners-ups qualifying for the final tournament, with group the exception of group C where only one teams qualified.

== Draw ==
The draw took place on 15 March 2024. The seeding was based on the teams' previous European Championship performance. Bold text indicates who qualified.

=== Seeding ===
| Pot 1 | Pot 2 | Pot 3 | Pot 4 | Pot 5 |
|---|---|---|---|---|
| **Netherlands**; **Malta**; **France**; Georgia | **Turkey**; **Romania**; **Czech Republic**; Slovakia | Ukraine; Great Britain; Bulgaria; **Slovenia** | Lithuania; Switzerland; Finland; Poland | ~~Ireland~~; Cyprus; Bosnia and Herzegovina; Sweden |

== Groups ==
=== Group A ===
Held in Trebinje, Bosnia and Herzegovina

| Pos | Team | Pld | W | PSW | PSL | L | GF | GA | GD | Pts | Qualification |
|---|---|---|---|---|---|---|---|---|---|---|---|
| 1 | France | 4 | 4 | 0 | 0 | 0 | 88 | 14 | +74 | **12** | Final tournament |
| 2 | Czech Republic | 4 | 3 | 0 | 0 | 1 | 42 | 31 | +11 | **9** | Final tournament |
| 3 | Bosnia and Herzegovina (H) | 4 | 2 | 0 | 0 | 2 | 42 | 48 | −6 | **6** | |
| 4 | Great Britain | 4 | 1 | 0 | 0 | 3 | 38 | 50 | −12 | **3** | |
| 5 | Finland | 4 | 0 | 0 | 0 | 4 | 23 | 90 | −67 | **0** | |

Source: Report
Rules for classification: 1) points; 2) head-to-head points; 3) head-to-head goal difference; 4) head-to-head number of goals scored; 5) Goal difference.
(H) Host

| 14 March 2024; 17:15 | Report | **Czech Republic** | **9**–6 | Great Britain | Trebinje, Bosnia and Herzegovina; Referees: Levan Berishvili (GEO), Jurjaj Mudroch (SUI) |
| 14 March 2024; 17:15 | Report | Score by quarters: **3**–1, **2**–1, **2**–0, 2–**4** | | | Trebinje, Bosnia and Herzegovina; Referees: Levan Berishvili (GEO), Jurjaj Mudroch (SUI) |

| 14 March 2024; 19:30 | Report | **Bosnia and Herzegovina** | **20**–10 | Finland | Trebinje, Bosnia and Herzegovina; Referees: Tomi Kavcic (SLO), Gokhan Can Ciger (TUR) |
| 14 March 2024; 19:30 | Report | Score by quarters: 3–3, **4**–2, 3–3, **10**–2 | | | Trebinje, Bosnia and Herzegovina; Referees: Tomi Kavcic (SLO), Gokhan Can Ciger (TUR) |

| 15 March 2024; 09:45 | Report | Great Britain | 3–**22** | **France** | Trebinje, Bosnia and Herzegovina; Referees: Alexandros Vlastos (SWE), Gokhan Can Ciger (TUR) |
| 15 March 2024; 09:45 | Report | Score by quarters: 1–1, 0–**6**, 1–**7**, 1–**8** | | | Trebinje, Bosnia and Herzegovina; Referees: Alexandros Vlastos (SWE), Gokhan Can Ciger (TUR) |

| 15 March 2024; 12:00 | Report | **Czech Republic** | **20**–2 | Finland | Trebinje, Bosnia and Herzegovina; Referees: Jurjaj Mudroch (SUI), Tomi Kavcic (SLO) |
| 15 March 2024; 12:00 | Report | Score by quarters: **3**–0, **8**–0, **4**–0, **5**–2 | | | Trebinje, Bosnia and Herzegovina; Referees: Jurjaj Mudroch (SUI), Tomi Kavcic (SLO) |

| 15 March 2024; 17:15 | Report | **Bosnia and Herzegovina** | **12**–9 | Great Britain | Trebinje, Bosnia and Herzegovina; Referees: Gokhan Can Ciger (TUR), Levan Berishvili (GEO) |
| 15 March 2024; 17:15 | Report | Score by quarters: 1–**3**, **5**–3, **2**–1, **4**–2 | | | Trebinje, Bosnia and Herzegovina; Referees: Gokhan Can Ciger (TUR), Levan Berishvili (GEO) |

| 15 March 2024; 19:30 | Report | **France** | **17**–3 | Czech Republic | Trebinje, Bosnia and Herzegovina; Referees: Tomi Kavcic (SLO), Alexandros Vlastos (SWE) |
| 15 March 2024; 19:30 | Report | Score by quarters: **3**–1, **2**–0, **7**–1, **5**–1 | | | Trebinje, Bosnia and Herzegovina; Referees: Tomi Kavcic (SLO), Alexandros Vlastos (SWE) |

| 16 March 2024; 17:15 | Report | **France** | **30**–4 | Finland | Trebinje, Bosnia and Herzegovina; Referees: Alexandros Vlastos (SWE), Jurjaj Mudroch (SUI) |
| 16 March 2024; 17:15 | Report | Score by quarters: **9**–0, **7**–2, **7**–1, **7**–1 | | | Trebinje, Bosnia and Herzegovina; Referees: Alexandros Vlastos (SWE), Jurjaj Mudroch (SUI) |

| 16 March 2024; 19:30 | Report | Bosnia and Herzegovina | 6–**10** | **Czech Republic** | Trebinje, Bosnia and Herzegovina; Referees: Levan Berishvili (GEO), Tomi Kavcic (SLO) |
| 16 March 2024; 19:30 | Report | Score by quarters: 1–**2**, 1–1, 3–3, 1–**4** | | | Trebinje, Bosnia and Herzegovina; Referees: Levan Berishvili (GEO), Tomi Kavcic (SLO) |

| 17 March 2024; 09:45 | Report | Finland | 7–**20** | **Great Britain** | Trebinje, Bosnia and Herzegovina; Referees: Levan Berishvili (GEO), Alexandros Vlastos (SWE) |
| 17 March 2024; 09:45 | Report | Score by quarters: 2–**5**, 2–**3**, 2–**7**, 1–**5** | | | Trebinje, Bosnia and Herzegovina; Referees: Levan Berishvili (GEO), Alexandros Vlastos (SWE) |

| 17 March 2024; 12:00 | Report | Bosnia and Herzegovina | 4–**19** | **France** | Trebinje, Bosnia and Herzegovina; Referees: Jurjaj Mudroch (SUI), Gokhan Can Ciger (TUR) |
| 17 March 2024; 12:00 | Report | Score by quarters: 1–**3**, 1–**4**, 2–**3**, 0–**9** | | | Trebinje, Bosnia and Herzegovina; Referees: Jurjaj Mudroch (SUI), Gokhan Can Ciger (TUR) |

=== Group B ===
Held in Maribor, Slovenia

| Pos | Team | Pld | W | PSW | PSL | L | GF | GA | GD | Pts | Qualification |
|---|---|---|---|---|---|---|---|---|---|---|---|
| 1 | Turkey | 4 | 4 | 0 | 0 | 0 | 74 | 39 | +35 | **12** | Final tournament |
| 2 | Slovenia (H) | 4 | 2 | 0 | 0 | 2 | 54 | 59 | −5 | **6 (Note: Head-to-head goal difference: Slovenia +4, Georgia +3, Sweden –7.)** | Final tournament |
| 3 | Georgia | 4 | 2 | 0 | 0 | 2 | 57 | 49 | +8 | **6** | |
| 4 | Sweden | 4 | 2 | 0 | 0 | 2 | 50 | 54 | −4 | **6** | |
| 5 | Switzerland | 4 | 0 | 0 | 0 | 4 | 38 | 72 | −34 | **0** | |

Source: Report
Rules for classification: 1) points; 2) head-to-head points; 3) head-to-head goal difference; 4) head-to-head number of goals scored; 5) Goal difference.
(H) Host
Notes:

| 14 March 2024; 18:00 | Report | **Georgia** | **22**–11 | Switzerland | Maribor, Slovenia; Referees: Karel Dvoracek (CZE), Filippou Polidoros (CYP) |
| 14 March 2024; 18:00 | Report | Score by quarters: **4**–2, **9**–3, **5**–3, **4**–3 | | | Maribor, Slovenia; Referees: Karel Dvoracek (CZE), Filippou Polidoros (CYP) |

| 14 March 2024; 20:00 | Report | **Slovenia** | **18**–10 | Sweden | Maribor, Slovenia; Referees: Alexandru Mustata (ROU), Tomas Kaseta (LTU) |
| 14 March 2024; 20:00 | Report | Score by quarters: **7**–3, **4**–2, **3**–2, **4**–3 | | | Maribor, Slovenia; Referees: Alexandru Mustata (ROU), Tomas Kaseta (LTU) |

| 15 March 2024; 10:00 | Report | Switzerland | 9–**10** | **Slovenia** | Maribor, Slovenia; Referees: Filippou Polidoros (CYP) |
| 15 March 2024; 10:00 | Report | Score by quarters: **4**–2, 1–**3**, 1–**3**, **3**–2 | | | Maribor, Slovenia; Referees: Filippou Polidoros (CYP) |

| 15 March 2024; 12:00 | Report | **Turkey** | **13**–7 | Georgia | Maribor, Slovenia; Referees: Karel Dvoracek (CZE), Alexandru Mustata (ROU) |
| 15 March 2024; 12:00 | Report | Score by quarters: **4**–1, 1–1, **4**–3, **4**–2 | | | Maribor, Slovenia; Referees: Karel Dvoracek (CZE), Alexandru Mustata (ROU) |

| 15 March 2024; 18:00 | Report | **Sweden** | **16**–11 | Switzerland | Maribor, Slovenia; Referees: Tomas Kaseta (LTU), Filippou Polidoros (CYP) |
| 15 March 2024; 18:00 | Report | Score by quarters: **5**–2, **4**–3, 3–3, **4**–3 | | | Maribor, Slovenia; Referees: Tomas Kaseta (LTU), Filippou Polidoros (CYP) |

| 15 March 2024; 20:00 | Report | Slovenia | 12–**22** | **Turkey** | Maribor, Slovenia; Referees: Karel Dvoracek (CZE) |
| 15 March 2024; 20:00 | Report | Score by quarters: 4–**9**, 2–**4**, 2–**4**, 4–**5** | | | Maribor, Slovenia; Referees: Karel Dvoracek (CZE) |

| 16 March 2024; 17:00 | Report | Switzerland | 7–**24** | **Turkey** | Maribor, Slovenia; Referees: Alexandru Mustata (ROU), Tomas Kaseta (LTU) |
| 16 March 2024; 17:00 | Report | Score by quarters: 2–**5**, 2–**6**, 1–**8**, 2–**5** | | | Maribor, Slovenia; Referees: Alexandru Mustata (ROU), Tomas Kaseta (LTU) |

| 16 March 2024; 19:00 | Report | **Sweden** | **11**–10 | Georgia | Maribor, Slovenia; Referees: Filippou Polidoros (CYP) |
| 16 March 2024; 19:00 | Report | Score by quarters: 0–**1**, **5**–4, 2–**3**, **4**–2 | | | Maribor, Slovenia; Referees: Filippou Polidoros (CYP) |

| 17 March 2024; 09:30 | Report | **Turkey** | **15**–13 | Sweden | Maribor, Slovenia; Referees: Alexandru Mustata (ROU), Tomas Kaseta (LTU) |
| 17 March 2024; 09:30 | Report | Score by quarters: 3–3, **4**–2, **5**–3, 3–**5** | | | Maribor, Slovenia; Referees: Alexandru Mustata (ROU), Tomas Kaseta (LTU) |

| 17 March 2024; 11:30 | Report | **Georgia** | **18**–14 | Slovenia | Maribor, Slovenia; Referees: Karel Dvoracek (CZE) |
| 17 March 2024; 11:30 | Report | Score by quarters: **3**–2, **6**–3, 5–5, 4–4 | | | Maribor, Slovenia; Referees: Karel Dvoracek (CZE) |

=== Group C ===
Held in Łódź, Poland

| Pos | Team | Pld | W | PSW | PSL | L | GF | GA | GD | Pts | Qualification |
|---|---|---|---|---|---|---|---|---|---|---|---|
| 1 | Malta | 3 | 3 | 0 | 0 | 0 | 42 | 21 | +21 | **9** | Final tournament |
| 2 | Poland (H) | 3 | 2 | 0 | 0 | 1 | 26 | 26 | 0 | **6** | |
| 3 | Slovakia | 3 | 1 | 0 | 0 | 2 | 26 | 35 | −9 | **3** | |
| 4 | Bulgaria | 3 | 0 | 0 | 0 | 3 | 31 | 43 | −12 | **0** | Final tournament as host |
| 5 | Ireland | 0 | 0 | 0 | 0 | 0 | 0 | 0 | 0 | **0** | Withdrew |

Source: Report
Rules for classification: 1) points; 2) head-to-head points; 3) head-to-head goal difference; 4) head-to-head number of goals scored; 5) Goal difference.
(H) Host

| 15 March 2024; 18:30 | Report | **Malta** | **15**–7 | Slovakia | Łódź, Poland; Referees: Maxim Gerasimov (GBR), George Makharadze (UKR) |
| 15 March 2024; 18:30 | Report | Score by quarters: **4**–1, **5**–4, **3**–1, **3**–1 | | | Łódź, Poland; Referees: Maxim Gerasimov (GBR), George Makharadze (UKR) |

| 15 March 2024; 20:30 | Report | **Poland** | **14**–9 | Bulgaria | Łódź, Poland; Referees: Alban David (FRA), Jarkko Virtanen (FIN) |
| 15 March 2024; 20:30 | Report | Score by quarters: **2**–0, **5**–3, **5**–4, 2–2 | | | Łódź, Poland; Referees: Alban David (FRA), Jarkko Virtanen (FIN) |

| 16 March 2024; 16:30 | Report | **Slovakia** | **13**–12 | Bulgaria | Łódź, Poland; Referees: Jarkko Virtanen (FIN), George Makharadze (UKR) |
| 16 March 2024; 16:30 | Report | Score by quarters: 1–**4**, **3**–2, **4**–2, **5**–4 | | | Łódź, Poland; Referees: Jarkko Virtanen (FIN), George Makharadze (UKR) |

| 16 March 2024; 18:30 | Report | Poland | 4–**11** | **Malta** | Łódź, Poland; Referees: Alban David (FRA), Maxim Gerasimov (GBR) |
| 16 March 2024; 18:30 | Report | Score by quarters: 0–**3**, 1–**3**, 2–**3**, 1–**2** | | | Łódź, Poland; Referees: Alban David (FRA), Maxim Gerasimov (GBR) |

| 17 March 2024; 09:30 | Report | Bulgaria | 10–**16** | **Malta** | Łódź, Poland; Referees: Jarkko Virtanen (FIN), Maxim Gerasimov (GBR) |
| 17 March 2024; 09:30 | Report | Score by quarters: 1–**4**, 4–**5**, **3**–2, 2–**5** | | | Łódź, Poland; Referees: Jarkko Virtanen (FIN), Maxim Gerasimov (GBR) |

| 17 March 2024; 11:30 | Report | '**Poland** | **8**–6 | Slovakia | Łódź, Poland; Referees: Alban David (FRA), George Makharadze (UKR) |
| 17 March 2024; 11:30 | Report | Score by quarters: **3**–0, 1–1, 4–4, 0–**1** | | | Łódź, Poland; Referees: Alban David (FRA), George Makharadze (UKR) |

=== Group D ===
Held in Bucharest, Romania

| Pos | Team | Pld | W | PSW | PSL | L | GF | GA | GD | Pts | Qualification |
|---|---|---|---|---|---|---|---|---|---|---|---|
| 1 | Netherlands | 4 | 4 | 0 | 0 | 0 | 78 | 24 | +54 | **12** | Final tournament |
| 2 | Romania (H) | 4 | 3 | 0 | 0 | 1 | 63 | 32 | +31 | **9** | Final tournament |
| 3 | Ukraine | 4 | 2 | 0 | 0 | 2 | 53 | 37 | +16 | **6** | |
| 4 | Cyprus | 4 | 1 | 0 | 0 | 3 | 27 | 70 | −43 | **3** | |
| 5 | Lithuania | 4 | 0 | 0 | 0 | 4 | 18 | 76 | −58 | **0** | |

Source: Report
Rules for classification: 1) points; 2) head-to-head points; 3) head-to-head goal difference; 4) head-to-head number of goals scored; 5) Goal difference.
(H) Host

| 14 March 2024; 17:00 | Report | **Netherlands** | **25**–2 | Lithuania | Bucharest, Romania; Referees: Alex De Raffaele (MLT), Erik Kolar (SVK) |
| 14 March 2024; 17:00 | Report | Score by quarters: **5**–1, **7**–0, **7**–1, **6**–0 | | | Bucharest, Romania; Referees: Alex De Raffaele (MLT), Erik Kolar (SVK) |

| 14 March 2024; 19:00 | Report | **Romania** | **27**–4 | Cyprus | Bucharest, Romania; Referees: Nikola Nanov (BUL), Lukasz Kroz (POL) |
| 14 March 2024; 19:00 | Report | Score by quarters: **7**–1, **6**–2, **6**–1, **8**–0 | | | Bucharest, Romania; Referees: Nikola Nanov (BUL), Lukasz Kroz (POL) |

| 15 March 2024; 09:00 | Report | Lithuania | 8–**15** | **Cyprus** | Bucharest, Romania; Referees: Erik Kolar (SVK), Neven Spoljaric (BIH) |
| 15 March 2024; 09:00 | Report | Score by quarters: 1–**5**, 3–**5**, **3**–1, 1–**4** | | | Bucharest, Romania; Referees: Erik Kolar (SVK), Neven Spoljaric (BIH) |

| 15 March 2024; 11:00 | Report | Ukraine | 8–**13** | **Netherlands** | Bucharest, Romania; Referees: Alex De Raffaele (MLT), Lukasz Kroz (POL) |
| 15 March 2024; 11:00 | Report | Score by quarters: **4**–2, 1–**3**, 2–**4**, 1–**4** | | | Bucharest, Romania; Referees: Alex De Raffaele (MLT), Lukasz Kroz (POL) |

| 15 March 2024; 18:00 | Report | **Ukraine** | **25**–5 | Lithuania | Bucharest, Romania; Referees: Neven Spoljaric (BIH), Lukasz Kroz (POL) |
| 15 March 2024; 18:00 | Report | Score by quarters: **6**–2, **5**–1, **8**–8, **6**–2 | | | Bucharest, Romania; Referees: Neven Spoljaric (BIH), Lukasz Kroz (POL) |

| 15 March 2024; 20:00 | Report | Romania | 11–**19** | **Netherlands** | Bucharest, Romania; Referees: Nikola Nanov (BUL), Erik Kolar (SVK) |
| 15 March 2024; 20:00 | Report | Score by quarters: 2–2, **5**–1, 2–**9**, 2–**7** | | | Bucharest, Romania; Referees: Nikola Nanov (BUL), Erik Kolar (SVK) |

| 16 March 2024; 16:30 | Report | Cyprus | 3–**21** | **Netherlands** | Bucharest, Romania; Referees: Neven Spoljaric (BIH), Nikola Nanov (BUL) |
| 16 March 2024; 16:30 | Report | Score by quarters: 1–**4**, 0–**6**, 1–**6**, 1–**5** | | | Bucharest, Romania; Referees: Neven Spoljaric (BIH), Nikola Nanov (BUL) |

| 16 March 2024; 18:30 | Report | Ukraine | 6–**14** | **Romania** | Bucharest, Romania; Referees: Erik Kolar (SVK), Alex De Raffaele (MLT) |
| 16 March 2024; 18:30 | Report | Score by quarters: 3–**6**, 0–**5**, 2–2, 1–1 | | | Bucharest, Romania; Referees: Erik Kolar (SVK), Alex De Raffaele (MLT) |

| 17 March 2024; 09:00 | Report | Cyprus | 5–**14** | **Ukraine** | Bucharest, Romania; Referees: Neven Spoljaric (BIH), Nikola Nanov (BUL) |
| 17 March 2024; 09:00 | Report | Score by quarters: 1–**3**, 2–**3**, 1–**5**, 1–**3** | | | Bucharest, Romania; Referees: Neven Spoljaric (BIH), Nikola Nanov (BUL) |

| 17 March 2024; 11:00 | Report | Lithuania | 3–**11** | **Romania** | Bucharest, Romania; Referees: Lukasz Kroz (POL), Alex De Raffaele (MLT) |
| 17 March 2024; 11:00 | Report | Score by quarters: 0–**3**, 0–**3**, 1–**3**, 2–2 | | | Bucharest, Romania; Referees: Lukasz Kroz (POL), Alex De Raffaele (MLT) |
