= 2028 Men's European Water Polo Championship Qualifiers =

Water Polo Championship Qualifiers

Tournament details
- Host country: (Georgia (country)) Tbilisi
- Dates: TBD – 20 June
- Teams: 22

The 2028 Men's European Water Polo Championship Qualifiers are organised by European Aquatics and held between a date to be announced and 20 June 2027. The qualifiers will determine the eight men's water polo national teams that would join the eight automatically qualified teams, at the final tournament.

== Format ==
The format will be changed this time. 18 teams will start in the first part of the qualification. They will be divided into three groups of six teams, with the top-four placed teams advancing to the final qualifiers. Team ranked ninth to 12th from the last edition are already qualified for the final qualifiers. Those 16 teams will then play out the eight qualifying teams for the final tournament.

== Draw ==
The draw was scheduled to take place on 3 November 2026.

== Phase 1 ==
18 teams are split into three groups of six, with the top-four advancing to the final round.

Teams

- Azerbaijan
- Belarus
- Bulgaria
- Czech Republic
- Finland
- Germany
- Ireland
- Israel
- Lithuania
- Malta
- Poland
- Portugal
- Russia
- Slovakia
- Slovenia
- Sweden
- Switzerland

== Phase 2 ==
16 teams play out the final eight teams.

Teams

Entrance/qualification method	Team(s)
Ranked 9–12th in the 2026 edition	France; Georgia; Netherlands; Turkey
Advancing from Phase 1	

== Qualified teams ==
Event	Location	Vacancies	Qualified
Host nation	TBD		TBD
2026 European Championships	(Serbia) Belgrade	8	Serbia; Hungary; Greece; Italy; Spain; Croatia; Montenegro; Romania
Qualifiers	(Georgia (country)) Tbilisi	8	
