= 2018 Men's European Water Polo Championship Qualifiers =

2018 Men's European Water Polo Championship Qualifiers are series of qualification tournaments to decide the participants of the 2018 Men's European Water Polo Championship.

== Qualified teams ==
Teams directly qualified to the 2018 European Water Polo Championship:

- Serbia – winners of the 2016 Men's European Water Polo Championship
- Montenegro – runners-up of the 2016 Men's European Water Polo Championship
- Hungary – 3rd place of the 2016 Men's European Water Polo Championship
- Greece – 4th place of the 2016 Men's European Water Polo Championship
- Spain – Host nation and 5th place of the 2016 Men's European Water Polo Championship
- Italy – 6th place of the 2016 Men's European Water Polo Championship
- Croatia – 7th place of the 2016 Men's European Water Polo Championship
- Russia – 8th place of the 2016 Men's European Water Polo Championship

== Qualifying round 1 ==
Team	Pld	W	D	L	GF	GA	GD	Pts
Switzerland	3	3	0	0	29	22	+7	9
Czech Republic	3	2	0	1	28	24	+4	6
Austria	3	1	0	2	34	27	+7	3
Bulgaria	3	0	0	3	20	38	–18	0

17 March 2017; 19:15	Bulgaria	7–16	Austria	Prague

17 March 2017; 21:00	Czech Republic	7–8	Switzerland	Prague

18 March 2017; 18:00	Switzerland	12–7	Bulgaria	Prague

18 March 2017; 20:00	Czech Republic	11–10	Austria	Prague

19 March 2017; 09:30	Switzerland	9–8	Austria	Prague

19 March 2017; 11:30	Czech Republic	10–6	Bulgaria	Prague

== Qualifying round 2 ==
=== Group A ===
Team	Pld	W	D	L	GF	GA	GD	Pts
Ukraine	3	3	0	0	39	22	+17	9
Portugal	3	2	0	1	43	27	+16	6
Lithuania	3	1	0	2	27	42	–15	3
Czech Republic	3	0	0	3	22	40	–18	0

6 October 2017; 16:30	Ukraine	18–7	Lithuania	Rio Maior

6 October 2017; 18:30	Portugal	17–9	Czech Republic	Rio Maior

7 October 2017; 16:00	Lithuania	13–8	Czech Republic	Rio Maior

7 October 2017; 18:00	Portugal	10–11	Ukraine	Rio Maior

8 October 2017; 09:30	Czech Republic	5–10	Ukraine	Rio Maior

8 October 2017; 11:30	Portugal	16–7	Lithuania	Rio Maior

=== Group B ===
Team	Pld	W	D	L	GF	GA	GD	Pts
Belarus	3	3	0	0	32	14	+18	9
Israel	3	2	0	1	22	19	+3	6
Poland	3	0	1	2	19	24	–5	1
Switzerland	3	0	1	2	15	31	–16	1

6 October 2017; 17:00	Belarus	14–5	Switzerland	Gorzów Wielkopolski

6 October 2017; 18:30	Poland	7–8	Israel	Gorzów Wielkopolski

7 October 2017; 17:00	Belarus	9–4	Israel	Gorzów Wielkopolski

7 October 2017; 18:30	Poland	7–7	Switzerland	Gorzów Wielkopolski

8 October 2017; 08:30	Poland	5–9	Belarus	Gorzów Wielkopolski

8 October 2017; 10:00	Switzerland	3–10	Israel	Gorzów Wielkopolski

== Qualifying round 3 ==
No teams were eliminated in round 2, but their results determined the matches of the following round (play-off format with home and away games) held in 2018. These eight teams faced the teams classified 9 to 16 in the 2016 Men's European Water Polo Championship.

Seeded	Unseeded
From the 2016 European Championship
France	Slovakia
Romania	Georgia
Germany	Malta
Netherlands	Turkey
From the Qualifying round 2
Ukraine	Lithuania
Belarus	Poland
Portugal	Czech Republic
Israel	Switzerland

=== Playoffs ===
- 1st leg: 24 February 2018
- 2nd leg: 3 March 2018

Team 1	Agg.	Team 2	1st leg	2nd leg
France	30–6	Switzerland	18–1	12–5
Romania	37–11	Czech Republic	20–5	17–6
Poland	8–44	Germany	2–21	6–23
Netherlands	42–13	Lithuania	28–7	14–6
Portugal	6–25	Slovakia	4–16	2–9
Georgia	23–11	Israel	12–1	11–10
Belarus	17–23	Malta	8–7	9–16
Ukraine	15–18	Turkey	8–8	7–10
