= 2014 Men's European Water Polo Championship Qualifiers =

2014 Men's European Water Polo Championship Qualifiers are series of qualification tournaments to decide the participants of the 2014 Men's European Water Polo Championship, running from 4 April 2013 to 12 April 2014.

== Teams directly qualified to the 2014 EWPC ==
- Serbia (Winners, 2012 Men's European Water Polo Championship)
- Montenegro (Runners-up, 2012 Men's European Water Polo Championship)
- Hungary Hosts, (3rd Place, 2012 Men's European Water Polo Championship)
- Italy (4th Place, 2012 Men's European Water Polo Championship)
- Germany (5th Place, 2012 Men's European Water Polo Championship)
- Greece (6th Place, 2012 Men's European Water Polo Championship)

== Teams received byes to the qualifying round 3 ==
- Spain (7th Place, 2012 Men's European Water Polo Championship)
- Romania (8th Place, 2012 Men's European Water Polo Championship)
- Croatia (9th Place, 2012 Men's European Water Polo Championship)
- Netherlands (10th Place, 2012 Men's European Water Polo Championship)
- North Macedonia (11th Place, 2012 Men's European Water Polo Championship)
- Turkey (12th Place, 2012 Men's European Water Polo Championship)

== Qualifying round 1 ==
=== Group A ===
Team	Pld	W	D	L	GF	GA	GD	Pts
Georgia	4	3	1	0	51	25	+26	10
Slovakia	4	2	2	0	35	16	+19	8
Great Britain	4	2	1	1	36	24	+12	7
Poland	4	1	0	3	22	43	−21	3
Czech Republic	4	0	0	4	17	53	−36	0

4 April 2013; 17:30	Report	Slovakia	11–1	Poland

4 April 2013; 19:00	Report	Georgia	12–3	Great Britain

5 April 2013; 10:00	Report	Czech Republic	3–12	Slovakia

5 April 2013; 11:30	Report	Poland	3–11	Great Britain

5 April 2013; 18:30	Report	Czech Republic	5–8	Poland

5 April 2013; 20:00	Report	Georgia	7–7	Slovakia

6 April 2013; 17:30	Report	Great Britain	17–4	Czech Republic

6 April 2013; 19:00	Report	Georgia	16–10	Poland

7 April 2013; 11:30	Report	Great Britain	5–5	Slovakia

7 April 2013; 13:00	Report	Georgia	16–5	Czech Republic

=== Group B ===
Team	Pld	W	D	L	GF	GA	GD	Pts
France	5	5	0	0	80	22	+58	15
Slovenia	5	4	0	1	70	35	+35	12
Ukraine	5	2	1	2	49	55	−6	7
Moldova	5	1	1	3	38	63	−25	4
Belarus	5	1	0	4	27	57	−30	3
Switzerland	5	1	0	4	38	70	−32	3

30 May 2013; 16:00	Report	Switzerland	9–8	Moldova

30 May 2013; 17:30	Report	Belarus	4–13	Slovenia

30 May 2013; 19:00	Report	France	14–7	Ukraine

31 May 2013; 9:00	Report	Ukraine	14–8	Switzerland

31 May 2013; 10:30	Report	Slovenia	19–5	Moldova

31 May 2013; 12:00	Report	Belarus	0–18	France

31 May 2013; 17:00	Report	Ukraine	10–10	Moldova

31 May 2013; 18:30	Report	France	9–4	Slovenia

31 May 2013; 20:00	Report	Switzerland	7–9	Belarus

1 June 2013; 16:00	Report	France	22–5	Switzerland

1 June 2013; 17:30	Report	Slovenia	17–8	Ukraine

1 June 2013; 19:00	Report	Belarus	8–9	Moldova

2 June 2013; 9:00	Report	Moldova	6–17	France

2 June 2013; 10:30	Report	Switzerland	9–17	Slovenia

2 June 2013; 12:00	Report	Ukraine	10–6	Belarus

=== Group C ===
Team	Pld	W	D	L	GF	GA	GD	Pts
Russia	5	5	0	0	122	26	+94	15
Malta	5	3	1	1	65	51	+14	10
Portugal	5	3	0	2	50	57	−7	9
Israel	5	2	1	2	47	50	−3	7
Denmark	5	1	0	4	46	67	−21	3
Bulgaria	5	0	0	5	35	114	−79	0

4 April 2013; 15:00	Report	Bulgaria	6–17	Israel

4 April 2013; 17:00	Report	Malta	16–8	Portugal

4 April 2013; 19:00	Report	Denmark	4–22	Russia

5 April 2013; 8:30	Report	Israel	6–9	Portugal

5 April 2013; 10:30	Report	Denmark	19–11	Bulgaria

5 April 2013; 12:30	Report	Russia	20–8	Malta

5 April 2013; 16:00	Report	Bulgaria	7–18	Portugal

5 April 2013; 18:00	Report	Israel	5–23	Russia

5 April 2013; 20:00	Report	Denmark	10–11	Malta

6 April 2013; 16:00	Report	Malta	24–7	Bulgaria

6 April 2013; 18:00	Report	Portugal	5–21	Russia

6 April 2013; 20:00	Report	Denmark	6–13	Israel

7 April 2013; 9:00	Report	Malta	6–6	Israel

7 April 2013; 11:00	Report	Russia	36–4	Bulgaria

7 April 2013; 13:00	Report	Denmark	7–10	Portugal

== Qualifying round 2 ==
=== Group D ===
Team	Pld	W	D	L	GF	GA	GD	Pts QR2	Pts Total
Georgia	4	4	0	0	68	35	+33	12	22
Ukraine	4	3	0	1	40	35	+5	9	16
Malta	4	1	0	3	41	41	−0	3	13
Israel	4	1	0	3	35	36	−1	3	10
Belarus	4	1	0	3	26	63	−37	3	6

11 July 2013; 19:00	Report	Georgia	13–8	Israel

11 July 2013; 20:15	Report	Malta	10–11	Belarus

12 July 2013; 19:00	Report	Ukraine	13–5	Belarus

12 July 2013; 20:15	Report	Israel	4–11	Malta

13 July 2013; 9:30	Report	Belarus	3–16	Israel

13 July 2013; 10:45	Report	Georgia	15–8	Ukraine

13 July 2013; 17:30	Report	Belarus	7–24	Georgia

13 July 2013; 18:45	Report	Ukraine	10–8	Malta

14 July 2013; 9:30	Report	Israel	7–9	Ukraine

14 July 2013; 10:45	Report	Malta	12–16	Georgia

=== Group E ===
Team	Pld	W	D	L	GF	GA	GD	Pts QR2	Pts Total
France	5	4	1	0	81	36	+45	13	28
Slovakia	5	4	0	1	85	32	+53	12	20
Great Britain	5	3	1	1	64	35	+29	10	17
Denmark	5	2	0	3	44	78	−34	6	9
Moldova	5	1	0	4	48	85	−37	3	7
Switzerland	5	0	0	5	34	90	−56	0	3

11 July 2013; 16:00	Report	France	21–9	Moldova

11 July 2013; 17:30	Report	Great Britain	18–6	Switzerland

11 July 2013; 19:00	Report	Slovakia	21–4	Denmark

12 July 2013; 9:00	Report	Denmark	15–12	Moldova

12 July 2013; 10:30	Report	Slovakia	26–7	Switzerland

12 July 2013; 12:00	Report	France	8–8	Great Britain

12 July 2013; 16:00	Report	Switzerland	6–14	Denmark

12 July 2013; 17:30	Report	Great Britain	18–7	Moldova

12 July 2013; 19:00	Report	Slovakia	9–10	France

13 July 2013; 16:00	Report	France	24–6	Denmark

13 July 2013; 17:30	Report	Moldova	14–11	Switzerland

13 July 2013; 19:00	Report	Slovakia	9–5	Great Britain

14 July 2013; 8:30	Report	France	18–4	Switzerland

14 July 2013; 10:00	Report	Denmark	5–15	Great Britain

14 July 2013; 11:30	Report	Slovakia	20–6	Moldova

=== Group F ===
Team	Pld	W	D	L	GF	GA	GD	Pts QR2	Pts Total
Russia	5	4	1	0	59	20	+39	13	28
Slovenia	5	4	1	0	55	25	+30	13	25
Portugal	5	2	0	3	41	45	−4	6	15
Poland	5	3	0	2	43	35	+8	9	12
Czech Republic	5	1	0	4	35	58	−23	3	3
Bulgaria	5	0	0	5	0	50	−50	0	0

11 July 2013	Bulgaria	0–10 w.o.	Czech Republic

11 July 2013; 18:30	Report	Russia	16–4	Portugal

11 July 2013; 20:00	Report	Poland	6–11	Slovenia

12 July 2013	Bulgaria	0–10 w.o.	Portugal

12 July 2013; 18:30	Report	Russia	6–6	Slovenia

12 July 2013; 20:00	Report	Poland	12–5	Czech Republic

13 July 2013; 9:30	Report	Russia	17–5	Czech Republic

13 July 2013; 11:00	Report	Portugal	7–10	Slovenia

13 July 2013	Poland	10–0 w.o.	Bulgaria

13 July 2013; 17:00	Report	Czech Republic	6–18	Slovenia

13 July 2013	Bulgaria	0–10 w.o.	Russia

13 July 2013; 20:00	Report	Poland	10–9	Portugal

14 July 2013	Bulgaria	0–10 w.o.	Slovenia

14 July 2013; 10:30	Report	Czech Republic	9–11	Portugal

14 July 2013; 12:00	Report	Poland	5–10	Russia

== Qualifying round 3 ==
A home-and-away aggregate-goals playoff round was arranged between the six pre-qualified teams and the best six teams from the Round 2, played on February 15 and April 12, 2014. The winners of the playoffs qualified for the 2014 Men's European Water Polo Championship.

Team 1	Agg.	Team 2	1st leg	2nd leg
Ukraine	11 – 42	Spain	5 – 17	6 – 25
France	40 – 14	Malta	20 – 8	20 – 6
Georgia	17 – 16	Turkey	8 – 4	9 – 12
Slovakia	14 – 30	Croatia	8 – 16	6 – 14
Romania	36 – 15	Great Britain	18 – 7	18 – 8
Netherlands	19 – 23	Russia	9 – 11	10 – 12
