= 2024 Men's European U-19 Water Polo Championship =

Youth men's water polo tournament

Tournament details
- Host country: Bulgaria
- Venue: 1 (in 1 host city)
- Dates: 1–7 September 2024
- Teams: 16 (from 1 confederation)

Final positions
- Champions: Croatia (1st title)
- Runners-up: Montenegro
- Third place: Spain
- Fourth place: Hungary

Tournament statistics
- Matches played: 48

The 2024 Men's European U-19 Water Polo Championship was the 28th edition of the Men's European U-19 Water Polo Championship. The tournament was played in Burgas, Bulgaria from 1 to 7 September 2024. Serbia were the defending champions, but were eliminated in quarterfinals. Croatia won the tournament for the first time.

== Host selection ==
Burgas was given the hosting rights on 11 October 2023.

== Format ==
For the first time, the 16 teams are sorted into two Divisions, based on the last edition and the qualifiers. The top eight teams made Division 1 and the other eight teams Division 2. Both divisions were split into two groups of four teams. The top two teams from each group of Division 1 advanced directly to the quarterfinals, while the other two teams from each group played against one of the top two sides from each group in Division 2 in a play-off round. Starting with quarterfinals onward, the regular knock-out system was used.

== Qualification ==
Sixteen teams will compete at the main event.

- The host nation
- The top eight teams from the 2022 European Championship not already qualified as host nation
- Best seven teams from the qualifiers.

Event	Date	Location	Quotas	Nation(s)
Host	11 October 2023	–	1	Bulgaria
2022 European Championship	18–25 September 2022	(Montenegro) Podgorica	8	Serbia; Spain; Hungary; Greece; Croatia; Italy; Montenegro; Germany
Qualifiers	14–17 March 2024	Various	7	France; Turkey; Malta; Netherlands; Czech Republic; Slovenia; Romania

== Venue ==
2024 Men's European U-19 Water Polo Championship is located in Bulgaria	Burgas
2024 Men's European U-19 Water Polo Championship is located in Bulgaria	Capacity:

== Draw ==
The draw was held on 26 March 2024 in Barcelona, Spain.

Division 1

The pots for Division 1 were decided by the rankings of the 2022 U-19 European Championship.

Pot 1	Pot 2	Pot 3	Pot 4
Serbia; Spain	Hungary; Greece	Croatia; Italy	Montenegro; Germany

Division 2

The seeding for Division 2 was decided by who finished first and second in the qualifiers (excluding Bulgaria).

Pot 1	Pot 2
France; Turkey; Malta; Netherlands	Czech Republic; Slovenia; Bulgaria; Romania

== Preliminary round ==
All times are local (Eastern European Summer Time – UTC+3).

=== Division 1 ===
==== Group A ====
Pos	Team	Pld	W	PSW	PSL	L	GF	GA	GD	Pts	Qualification
1	Spain	3	2	0	0	1	33	28	+5	6 (Note: Head-to-head goal difference: Spain +3, Croatia +1, Hungary –4. Although, Hungary is ranked higher due to win over Croatia.)	Quarterfinals
2	Hungary	3	2	0	0	1	34	34	0	6	Quarterfinals
3	Croatia	3	2	0	0	1	28	26	+2	6	Playoffs
4	Montenegro	3	0	0	0	3	22	29	−7	0	Playoffs

Source: LEN
Rules for classification: 1) points; 2) head-to-head points; 3) head-to-head goal difference; 4) head-to-head number of goals scored; 5) Goal difference.
Notes:

1 September 2024; 14:15	Report	Croatia	9–10	Hungary	Park Arena OZK, Burgas
1 September 2024; 14:15	Report	Score by quarters: 3–3, 3–1, 1–2, 2–4			Park Arena OZK, Burgas

1 September 2024; 16:00	Report	Spain	8–6	Montenegro	Park Arena OZK, Burgas
1 September 2024; 16:00	Report	Score by quarters: 1–3, 2–1, 2–2, 3–0			Park Arena OZK, Burgas

2 September 2024; 14:15	Report	Montenegro	9–13	Hungary	Park Arena OZK, Burgas
2 September 2024; 14:15	Report	Score by quarters: 3–4, 2–3, 2–3, 2–3			Park Arena OZK, Burgas

2 September 2024; 21:15	Report	Croatia	11–9	Spain	Park Arena OZK, Burgas
2 September 2024; 21:15	Report	Score by quarters: 3–1, 1–4, 5–3, 2–1			Park Arena OZK, Burgas

3 September 2024; 17:45	Report	Croatia	8–7	Montenegro	Park Arena OZK, Burgas
3 September 2024; 17:45	Report	Score by quarters: 2–3, 2–0, 2–3, 2–1			Park Arena OZK, Burgas

3 September 2024; 21:15	Report	Spain	16–11	Hungary	Park Arena OZK, Burgas
3 September 2024; 21:15	Report	Score by quarters: 3–3, 3–2, 4–3, 6–3			Park Arena OZK, Burgas

==== Group B ====
Pos	Team	Pld	W	PSW	PSL	L	GF	GA	GD	Pts	Qualification
1	Serbia	3	3	0	0	0	39	27	+12	9	Quarterfinals
2	Greece	3	2	0	0	1	37	34	+3	6	Quarterfinals
3	Germany	3	1	0	0	2	23	32	−9	3	Playoffs
4	Italy	3	0	0	0	3	30	36	−6	0	Playoffs

Source: LEN
Rules for classification: 1) points; 2) head-to-head points; 3) head-to-head goal difference; 4) head-to-head number of goals scored; 5) Goal difference.

1 September 2024; 17:45	Report	Greece	9–14	Serbia	Park Arena OZK, Burgas
1 September 2024; 17:45	Report	Score by quarters: 4–3, 3–3, 1–6, 1–2			Park Arena OZK, Burgas

1 September 2024; 21:15	Report	Germany	9–6	Italy	Park Arena OZK, Burgas
1 September 2024; 21:15	Report	Score by quarters: 2–1, 2–3, 4–1, 1–1			Park Arena OZK, Burgas

2 September 2024; 16:00	Report	Greece	16–10	Germany	Park Arena OZK, Burgas
2 September 2024; 16:00	Report	Score by quarters: 3–6, 6–0, 3–1, 4–3			Park Arena OZK, Burgas

2 September 2024; 17:45	Report	Italy	14–15	Serbia	Park Arena OZK, Burgas
2 September 2024; 17:45	Report	Score by quarters: 4–4, 3–3, 4–4, 3–4			Park Arena OZK, Burgas

3 September 2024; 14:15	Report	Greece	12–10	Italy	Park Arena OZK, Burgas
3 September 2024; 14:15	Report	Score by quarters: 6–3, 0–2, 3–2, 3–3			Park Arena OZK, Burgas

3 September 2024; 16:00	Report	Germany	4–10	Serbia	Park Arena OZK, Burgas
3 September 2024; 16:00	Report	Score by quarters: 1–3, 1–1, 1–2, 1–4			Park Arena OZK, Burgas

=== Division 2 ===
==== Group C ====
Pos	Team	Pld	W	PSW	PSL	L	GF	GA	GD	Pts	Qualification
1	Netherlands	3	3	0	0	0	46	28	+18	9	Playoffs
2	Turkey	3	2	0	0	1	36	34	+2	6	Playoffs
3	France	3	1	0	0	2	35	41	−6	3	Classification round
4	Malta	3	0	0	0	3	28	42	−14	0	Classification round

Source: LEN
Rules for classification: 1) points; 2) head-to-head points; 3) head-to-head goal difference; 4) head-to-head number of goals scored; 5) Goal difference.

1 September 2024; 9:00	Report	France	9–15	Turkey	Park Arena OZK, Burgas
1 September 2024; 9:00	Report	Score by quarters: 2–5, 3–2, 2–3, 2–5			Park Arena OZK, Burgas

1 September 2024; 10:45	Report	Netherlands	15–8	Malta	Park Arena OZK, Burgas
1 September 2024; 10:45	Report	Score by quarters: 3–2, 5–4, 3–1, 4–1			Park Arena OZK, Burgas

2 September 2024; 10:45	Report	Malta	9–12	Turkey	Park Arena OZK, Burgas
2 September 2024; 10:45	Report	Score by quarters: 3–2, 1–2, 3–5, 2–3			Park Arena OZK, Burgas

2 September 2024; 12:30	Report	France	11–15	Netherlands	Park Arena OZK, Burgas
2 September 2024; 12:30	Report	Score by quarters: 2–4, 2–3, 4–4, 3–4			Park Arena OZK, Burgas

3 September 2024; 9:00	Report	France	15–11	Malta	Park Arena OZK, Burgas
3 September 2024; 9:00	Report	Score by quarters: 6–1, 2–3, 4–2, 3–5			Park Arena OZK, Burgas

3 September 2024; 10:45	Report	Netherlands	16–9	Turkey	Park Arena OZK, Burgas
3 September 2024; 10:45	Report	Score by quarters: 4–3, 5–3, 4–2, 3–1			Park Arena OZK, Burgas

==== Group D ====
Pos	Team	Pld	W	PSW	PSL	L	GF	GA	GD	Pts	Qualification
1	Romania	3	3	0	0	0	52	30	+22	9	Playoffs
2	Bulgaria (H)	3	2	0	0	1	42	41	+1	6	Playoffs
3	Slovenia	3	1	0	0	2	35	49	−14	3	Classification round
4	Czech Republic	3	0	0	0	3	34	43	−9	0	Classification round

Source: LEN
Rules for classification: 1) points; 2) head-to-head points; 3) head-to-head goal difference; 4) head-to-head number of goals scored; 5) Goal difference.
(H) Host

1 September 2024; 12:30	Report	Romania	14–8	Czech Republic	Park Arena OZK, Burgas
1 September 2024; 12:30	Report	Score by quarters: 3–1, 4–2, 4–3, 3–2			Park Arena OZK, Burgas

1 September 2024; 19:30	Report	Slovenia	11–15	Bulgaria	Park Arena OZK, Burgas
1 September 2024; 19:30	Report	Score by quarters: 3–3, 5–5, 2–4, 1–3			Park Arena OZK, Burgas

2 September 2024; 9:00	Report	Slovenia	8–20	Romania	Park Arena OZK, Burgas
2 September 2024; 9:00	Report	Score by quarters: 1–5, 6–5, 1–5, 0–5			Park Arena OZK, Burgas

2 September 2024; 19:30	Report	Czech Republic	12–13	Bulgaria	Park Arena OZK, Burgas
2 September 2024; 19:30	Report	Score by quarters: 2–3, 3–4, 2–2, 5–4			Park Arena OZK, Burgas

3 September 2024; 12:30	Report	Slovenia	16–14	Czech Republic	Park Arena OZK, Burgas
3 September 2024; 12:30	Report	Score by quarters: 4–5, 3–3, 6–4, 3–2			Park Arena OZK, Burgas

3 September 2024; 19:30	Report	Romania	18–14	Bulgaria	Park Arena OZK, Burgas
3 September 2024; 19:30	Report	Score by quarters: 4–3, 3–4, 6–3, 5–4			Park Arena OZK, Burgas

== Knockout stage ==
=== Main bracket ===
Playoffs
4 September
Montenegro	16
Netherlands	15
4 September
Germany	24
Bulgaria	9
4 September
Italy	17
Romania	7
4 September
Croatia	14
Turkey	7

Quarterfinals
5 September
Serbia	17
Montenegro	18
5 September
Hungary	11
Germany	10
5 September
Spain	9
Italy	8
5 September
Greece	10
Croatia	11

Semifinals
6 September
Montenegro	6
Hungary	5
6 September
Spain	10
Croatia	14

Final
7 September
Montenegro	8
Croatia	10
Third place game
7 September
Hungary	14
Spain	16

=== Playoffs ===
4 September 2024; 13:30	Report	Montenegro	16–15 (PSO)	Netherlands	Park Arena OZK, Burgas
4 September 2024; 13:30	Report	Score by quarters: 2–1, 3–2, 5–4, 1–4 PSO: 5–4			Park Arena OZK, Burgas

4 September 2024; 15:15	Report	Italy	17–7	Romania	Park Arena OZK, Burgas
4 September 2024; 15:15	Report	Score by quarters: 4–1, 6–3, 3–2, 4–1			Park Arena OZK, Burgas

4 September 2024; 17:00	Report	Germany	24–9	Bulgaria	Park Arena OZK, Burgas
4 September 2024; 17:00	Report	Score by quarters: 5–2, 6–3, 6–2, 7–2			Park Arena OZK, Burgas

4 September 2024; 18:45	Report	Croatia	14–7	Turkey	Park Arena OZK, Burgas
4 September 2024; 18:45	Report	Score by quarters: 1–2, 6–1, 4–1, 3–3			Park Arena OZK, Burgas

=== 13th–16th place bracket ===
13th–16th place semifinals
4 September
Slovenia	8
Malta	16
4 September
Czech Republic	4
France	16

13th place game
5 September
Malta	8
France	9
15th place game
5 September
Slovenia	9
Czech Republic	11

==== 13th–16th place semifinals ====
4 September 2024; 10:00	Report	Slovenia	8–16	Malta	Park Arena OZK, Burgas
4 September 2024; 10:00	Report	Score by quarters: 2–6, 4–2, 0–3, 2–5			Park Arena OZK, Burgas

4 September 2024; 11:45	Report	Czech Republic	4–16	France	Park Arena OZK, Burgas
4 September 2024; 11:45	Report	Score by quarters: 1–7, 3–4, 0–1, 0–4			Park Arena OZK, Burgas

==== 15th place game ====
5 September 2024; 9:00	Report	Slovenia	9–11	Czech Republic	Park Arena OZK, Burgas
5 September 2024; 9:00	Report	Score by quarters: 2–3, 3–2, 2–3, 2–3			Park Arena OZK, Burgas

==== 13th place game ====
5 September 2024; 10:45	Report	Malta	8–9	France	Park Arena OZK, Burgas
5 September 2024; 10:45	Report	Score by quarters: 1–3, 2–5, 2–1, 3–0			Park Arena OZK, Burgas

=== 9th–12th place bracket ===
9th–12th place semifinals
5 September
Netherlands	22
Bulgaria	6
5 September
Romania	18
Turkey	19

Ninth place game
6 September
Netherlands	12
Turkey	10
Eleventh place game
6 September
Bulgaria	13
Romania	18

==== 9th–12th place semifinals ====
5 September 2024; 12:30	Report	Netherlands	22–6	Bulgaria	Park Arena OZK, Burgas
5 September 2024; 12:30	Report	Score by quarters: 7–2, 6–0, 4–0, 5–4			Park Arena OZK, Burgas

5 September 2024; 14:15	Report	Romania	18–19 (PSO)	Turkey	Park Arena OZK, Burgas
5 September 2024; 14:15	Report	Score by quarters: 4–1, 2–3, 6–4, 0–4 PSO: 6–7			Park Arena OZK, Burgas

==== Eleventh place game ====
6 September 2024; 10:00	Report	Bulgaria	13–18	Romania	Park Arena OZK, Burgas
6 September 2024; 10:00	Report	Score by quarters: 2–2, 4–3, 4–7, 3–6			Park Arena OZK, Burgas

==== Ninth place game ====
6 September 2024; 11:45	Report	Netherlands	12–10	Turkey	Park Arena OZK, Burgas
6 September 2024; 11:45	Report	Score by quarters: 4–2, 4–3, 1–1, 3–4			Park Arena OZK, Burgas

=== Quarterfinals ===
5 September 2024; 16:00	Report	Serbia	17–18 (PSO)	Montenegro	Park Arena OZK, Burgas
5 September 2024; 16:00	Report	Score by quarters: 4–1, 2–4, 4–5, 3–3 PSO: 4–5			Park Arena OZK, Burgas

5 September 2024; 17:45	Report	Spain	9–8	Italy	Park Arena OZK, Burgas
5 September 2024; 17:45	Report	Score by quarters: 2–2, 3–1, 2–1, 2–4			Park Arena OZK, Burgas

5 September 2024; 19:30	Report	Hungary	11–10	Germany	Park Arena OZK, Burgas
5 September 2024; 19:30	Report	Score by quarters: 1–5, 3–1, 4–2, 3–2			Park Arena OZK, Burgas

5 September 2024; 21:15	Report	Greece	10–11	Croatia	Park Arena OZK, Burgas
5 September 2024; 21:15	Report	Score by quarters: 3–4, 2–2, 3–2, 2–3			Park Arena OZK, Burgas

=== 5th–8th place bracket ===
5th–8th place semifinals
6 September
Serbia	10
Germany	13
6 September
Italy	19
Greece	18

Fifth place game
7 September
Germany	11
Italy	6
Seventh place game
7 September
Serbia	15
Greece	10

==== 5th–8th place semifinals ====
6 September 2024; 13:30	Report	Serbia	10–13	Germany	Park Arena OZK, Burgas
6 September 2024; 13:30	Report	Score by quarters: 2–3, 2–2, 3–5, 3–3			Park Arena OZK, Burgas

6 September 2024; 15:15	Report	Italy	19–18 (PSO)	Greece	Park Arena OZK, Burgas
6 September 2024; 15:15	Report	Score by quarters: 4–4, 4–4, 4–3, 2–3 PSO: 5–4			Park Arena OZK, Burgas

==== Seventh place game ====
7 September 2024; 14:00	Report	Serbia	15–10	Greece	Park Arena OZK, Burgas
7 September 2024; 14:00	Report	Score by quarters: 5–3, 2–1, 3–2, 5–4			Park Arena OZK, Burgas

==== Fifth place game ====
7 September 2024; 15:45	Report	Germany	11–6	Italy	Park Arena OZK, Burgas
7 September 2024; 15:45	Report	Score by quarters: 2–0, 3–3, 3–1, 3–2			Park Arena OZK, Burgas

=== Semifinals ===
6 September 2024; 17:00	Report	Montenegro	6–5	Hungary	Park Arena OZK, Burgas
6 September 2024; 17:00	Report	Score by quarters: 2–1, 1–2, 3–0, 0–2			Park Arena OZK, Burgas

6 September 2024; 18:45	Report	Spain	10–14	Croatia	Park Arena OZK, Burgas
6 September 2024; 18:45	Report	Score by quarters: 2–4, 2–3, 3–5, 3–2			Park Arena OZK, Burgas

=== Third place game ===
7 September 2024; 17:30	Report	Hungary	14–16 (PSO)	Spain	Park Arena OZK, Burgas
7 September 2024; 17:30	Report	Score by quarters: 4–1, 1–3, 3–4, 3–3 PSO: 3–5			Park Arena OZK, Burgas

=== Final ===
7 September 2024; 19:15	Report	Montenegro	8–10 (PSO)	Croatia	Park Arena OZK, Burgas
7 September 2024; 19:15	Report	Score by quarters: 0–1, 1–2, 3–1, 3–3 PSO: 1–3			Park Arena OZK, Burgas

== Final standings ==
Rank	Team
1st place, gold medalist(s)	Croatia
2nd place, silver medalist(s)	Montenegro
3rd place, bronze medalist(s)	Spain
4	Hungary
5	Germany
6	Italy
7	Serbia
8	Greece
9	Netherlands
10	Turkey
11	Romania
12	Bulgaria
13	France
14	Malta
15	Czech Republic
16	Slovenia
