= European Aquatics U16 Water Polo Championship =

International youth water polo competition

- Sport: Water polo
- Founded: 2019
- Organizing body: European Aquatics
- Divisions: 2
- No. of teams: 16 (Elite division)
- Continent: Europe
- Most recent champions: Men: Italy (1st title); Women: Spain (3rd title)
- Most titles: Men: Hungary (3 titles); Women: Spain (3 titles)
- Related competitions: European Aquatics U18 Water Polo Championship; European Aquatics U20 Water Polo Championship

The European Aquatics U16 Water Polo Championship, previously known as the LEN European U15 Water Polo Championship, is a continental water polo tournament held every two years for the players under the age of 16. In 2025, the age category was changed from U15 to U16.

== Age categories ==
- European U15 Championships : 2019–2023
- European U16 Championships : 2025–

== Men's tournament ==
=== History ===
Year	Host	(gold) Gold	(silver) Silver	(bronze) Bronze
Men's European U-15 Water Polo Championship
2019; Details	Burgas, Bulgaria	Hungary	Montenegro	Italy
2021; Details	Loulé, Portugal	Hungary	Spain	Greece
2023; Details	Podgorica, Montenegro	Hungary	Montenegro	Greece
Men's European U-16 Water Polo Championship
2025; Details	Istanbul, Turkey	Italy	Hungary	Montenegro
2026; Details	Zagreb, Croatia			

=== Medal table ===
Rank	Nation	Gold	Silver	Bronze	Total
1	Hungary	3	1	0	4
2	Italy	1	0	1	2
3	Montenegro	0	2	1	3
4	Spain	0	1	0	1
5	Greece	0	0	2	2
Totals (5 entries)		4	4	4	12

=== Division I ===
Year	Host	(gold) Gold	(silver) Silver	(bronze) Bronze
2025; Details	Ljubljana, Slovenia	France	Bulgaria	Bosnia and Herzegovina

== Women's tournament ==
=== History ===
Year	Host	(gold) Gold	(silver) Silver	(bronze) Bronze
Women's European U-15 Water Polo Championship
2019; Details	Kirishi, Russia	Spain	Russia	Greece
2021; Details	Szentes, Hungary	Hungary	Russia	Spain
2023; Details	Zagreb, Croatia	Spain	Greece	Hungary
Women's European U-16 Water Polo Championship
2025; Details	Istanbul, Turkey	Spain	Greece	Hungary

=== Medal table ===
Rank	Nation	Gold	Silver	Bronze	Total
1	Spain	3	0	1	4
2	Hungary	1	0	2	3
3	Greece	0	2	1	3
4	Russia	0	2	0	2
Totals (4 entries)		4	4	4	12

== See also ==
- European Aquatics U18 Water Polo Championship
- European Aquatics U20 Water Polo Championship
