= Jan Bakulo =

Lithuanian water polo player (born 1991)

Personal information
- Full name: Jan Bakulo
- Born: April 1, 1991 (age 35) Vilnius, Lithuania

Sport
- Country: Lithuania
- Sport: Water Polo
- League: Lithuanian Water Polo League
- Club: EVK Zaibas
- Team: Lithuanian national team
- Updated on 25 November 2020

Jan Bakulo, Jan Bakuło (born 1 April 1991 in Vilnius, Lithuania) is a Lithuanian professional water polo player of Lithuanian nationality.

== Clubs ==
In 2008 Bakulo won German Junior cup and U-17 for Hellas- Hildesheim Club. In 2009 Bakulo won Lithuanian Junior Cup with Vilnius Sports School team.

In 2011-2012 Bakulo played for German club White Sharks Hannover. During 2014–2015 season he played for Polish club Legia Warszawa.

He moved to Poland after he graduated from High School. He became the top scorer of the Polish league and received a Polish citizenship. He debuted with Polish National Team.

Since 2015 Bakulo was playing for German club ASC Duisburg and 2016 win 2 place in German Bundesliga. 2017 Place 3 in German Bundesliga Played Champions League 2016, 2018, 2020 with ASC Duisburg. Played Euro Cup 2021 with ASC Duisburg.

He is currently playing for EVK Zaibas from Lithuania and finished second in the 2024–25 European Aquatics Challenger Cup.

== National team ==
Jan Bakulo started competing on international level with Lithuanian National Junior and senior Team.

As of 2014 Bakulo is a captain of Lithuania men's national water polo team.

== Personal life ==
In 2014 Jan started dating Lithuanian professional dancer and social media influencer Monika Šalčiūnaitė.
