= 2025 Men's European U-16 Water Polo Championship =

Youth men's water polo tournament

Tournament details
- Host country: Turkey
- City: Istanbul
- Venue: 1 (in 1 host city)
- Dates: 7–13 July 2025
- Teams: 15 (from 1 confederation)

Final positions
- Champions: Italy (1st title)
- Runners-up: Hungary
- Third place: Montenegro
- Fourth place: Croatia

Official website
- European Aquatics

The 2025 Men's European U-16 Water Polo Championship was the fourth edition of the Men's European U-16 Water Polo Championship, organized by the European Aquatics. The tournament was played in Istanbul, Turkey from 7 to 13 July 2025. Starting this edition, the age level has changed from U15 to U16. Hungary were the three-times defending champions; Italy became the European champions for the first time.

== Host selection ==
Manisa was given the hosting rights on 13 November 2024, however, the host city was later changed to Istanbul.

== Participating teams ==
No qualification round took place; the top sixteen teams from the 2023 edition automatically qualified for the championship while the remaining registered teams competed in the newly formed Division I. Israel later withdrew from the tournament, leaving the championship with only 15 participating teams.

Teams
Hungary (1st)
Montenegro (2nd)
Greece (3rd)
Serbia (4th)
Spain (5th)
Italy (6th)
Croatia (7th)
Turkey (8th)
Germany (9th)
Malta (10th)
Romania (11th)
Netherlands (12th)
Georgia (13th)
~~Israel~~ (14th)
Poland (15th)
Moldova (16th)

== Venue ==
2025 Men's European U-16 Water Polo Championship is located in Turkey	Istanbul
2025 Men's European U-16 Water Polo Championship is located in Turkey	Beylikdüzü Swimming Pool

== Draw ==
The draw was held on 7 February 2025 in Zagreb, Croatia. The seeding was based on the results of the previous edition.

Sub-division 1

Pot 1	Pot 2	Pot 3	Pot 4
Hungary; Montenegro	Greece; Serbia	Spain; Italy	Croatia; Turkey

Sub-division 2

Pot 5	Pot 6	Pot 7	Pot 8
Germany; Malta	Romania; Netherlands	Georgia; ~~Israel~~	Poland; Moldova

== Preliminary round ==
All times are local (Turkey Time; UTC+3).

=== Sub-division 1 ===
==== Group A ====
Pos	Team	Pld	W	PSW	PSL	L	GF	GA	GD	Pts	Qualification
1	Serbia	3	3	0	0	0	39	31	+8	9	Quarterfinals
2	Spain	3	2	0	0	1	42	36	+6	6	Quarterfinals
3	Hungary	3	1	0	0	2	36	40	−4	3	Crossovers
4	Turkey	3	0	0	0	3	32	42	−10	0	Crossovers

Source: microplustimingservices.com
Rules for classification: 1) points; 2) head-to-head points; 3) head-to-head goal difference; 4) head-to-head number of goals scored; 5) Goal difference.

7 July 2025; 15:30	Report	Hungary	10–16	Spain	Beylikdüzü Swimming Pool, Istanbul; Referees: Sander Gransjean (NED), Luka Barbakadze (GEO)
7 July 2025; 15:30	Report	Score by quarters: 3–2, 4–4, 3–6, 0–4			Beylikdüzü Swimming Pool, Istanbul; Referees: Sander Gransjean (NED), Luka Barbakadze (GEO)
7 July 2025; 15:30	Report	Szaka, Tidrenczel 3	Goals	three players 3	Beylikdüzü Swimming Pool, Istanbul; Referees: Sander Gransjean (NED), Luka Barbakadze (GEO)

7 July 2025; 20:45	Report	Serbia	11–10	Turkey	Beylikdüzü Swimming Pool, Istanbul; Referees: Alex de Raffaele (MLT), Miklos Ferenc Toth (ROU)
7 July 2025; 20:45	Report	Score by quarters: 4–2, 2–2, 3–4, 2–2			Beylikdüzü Swimming Pool, Istanbul; Referees: Alex de Raffaele (MLT), Miklos Ferenc Toth (ROU)
7 July 2025; 20:45	Report	Jakovljevic 3	Goals	Yildiz 4	Beylikdüzü Swimming Pool, Istanbul; Referees: Alex de Raffaele (MLT), Miklos Ferenc Toth (ROU)

8 July 2025; 19:00	Report	Hungary	9–14	Serbia	Beylikdüzü Swimming Pool, Istanbul
8 July 2025; 19:00	Report	Score by quarters: 3–4, 4–3, 2–3, 0–4			Beylikdüzü Swimming Pool, Istanbul

8 July 2025; 20:45	Report	Turkey	12–14	Spain	Beylikdüzü Swimming Pool, Istanbul
8 July 2025; 20:45	Report	Score by quarters: 4–2, 4–5, 2–3, 2–4			Beylikdüzü Swimming Pool, Istanbul

9 July 2025; 19:00	Report	Serbia	14–12	Spain	Beylikdüzü Swimming Pool, Istanbul
9 July 2025; 19:00	Report	Score by quarters: 3–4, 3–1, 4–2, 4–5			Beylikdüzü Swimming Pool, Istanbul

9 July 2025; 20:45	Report	Hungary	17–10	Turkey	Beylikdüzü Swimming Pool, Istanbul
9 July 2025; 20:45	Report	Score by quarters: 4–5, 3–0, 5–3, 5–2			Beylikdüzü Swimming Pool, Istanbul

==== Group B ====
Pos	Team	Pld	W	PSW	PSL	L	GF	GA	GD	Pts	Qualification
1	Italy	3	3	0	0	0	54	40	+14	9	Quarterfinals
2	Greece	3	2	0	0	1	48	40	+8	6	Quarterfinals
3	Montenegro	3	0	1	0	2	34	45	−11	2	Crossovers
4	Croatia	3	0	0	1	2	36	47	−11	1	Crossovers

Source: microplustimingservices.com
Rules for classification: 1) points; 2) head-to-head points; 3) head-to-head goal difference; 4) head-to-head number of goals scored; 5) Goal difference.

7 July 2025; 17:15	Report	Montenegro	11–17	Italy	Beylikdüzü Swimming Pool, Istanbul
7 July 2025; 17:15	Report	Score by quarters: 4–3, 3–5, 1–3, 3–6			Beylikdüzü Swimming Pool, Istanbul

7 July 2025; 19:00	Report	Greece	17–10	Croatia	Beylikdüzü Swimming Pool, Istanbul
7 July 2025; 19:00	Report	Score by quarters: 2–1, 6–3, 3–3, 6–3			Beylikdüzü Swimming Pool, Istanbul

8 July 2025; 15:30	Report	Croatia	14–18	Italy	Beylikdüzü Swimming Pool, Istanbul
8 July 2025; 15:30	Report	Score by quarters: 3–4, 1–4, 7–3, 3–7			Beylikdüzü Swimming Pool, Istanbul

8 July 2025; 17:15	Report	Montenegro	11–16	Greece	Beylikdüzü Swimming Pool, Istanbul
8 July 2025; 17:15	Report	Score by quarters: 3–5, 5–4, 1–3, 2–4			Beylikdüzü Swimming Pool, Istanbul

9 July 2025; 15:30	Report	Montenegro	17–16 (PSO)	Croatia	Beylikdüzü Swimming Pool, Istanbul
9 July 2025; 15:30	Report	Score by quarters: 3–3, 4–4, 3–2, 2–3 PSO: 5–4			Beylikdüzü Swimming Pool, Istanbul

9 July 2025; 17:15	Report	Greece	15–19	Italy	Beylikdüzü Swimming Pool, Istanbul
9 July 2025; 17:15	Report	Score by quarters: 4–5, 5–6, 4–3, 2–5			Beylikdüzü Swimming Pool, Istanbul

=== Sub-division 2 ===
==== Group C ====
Pos	Team	Pld	W	PSW	PSL	L	GF	GA	GD	Pts	Qualification
1	Netherlands	3	3	0	0	0	57	35	+22	9	Crossovers
2	Georgia	3	2	0	0	1	36	35	+1	6	Crossovers
3	Malta	3	1	0	0	2	36	44	−8	3	13th–15th place classification
4	Moldova	3	0	0	0	3	35	50	−15	0	13th–15th place classification

Source: microplustimingservices.com
Rules for classification: 1) points; 2) head-to-head points; 3) head-to-head goal difference; 4) head-to-head number of goals scored; 5) Goal difference.

7 July 2025; 10:00	Report	Malta	8–11	Georgia	Beylikdüzü Swimming Pool, Istanbul
7 July 2025; 10:00	Report	Score by quarters: 0–1, 5–3, 0–4, 3–3			Beylikdüzü Swimming Pool, Istanbul

7 July 2025; 11:45	Report	Netherlands	19–13	Moldova	Beylikdüzü Swimming Pool, Istanbul
7 July 2025; 11:45	Report	Score by quarters: 4–5, 4–3, 6–3, 5–2			Beylikdüzü Swimming Pool, Istanbul

8 July 2025; 11:45	Report	Moldova	11–17	Georgia	Beylikdüzü Swimming Pool, Istanbul
8 July 2025; 11:45	Report	Score by quarters: 3–4, 1–4, 3–4, 4–5			Beylikdüzü Swimming Pool, Istanbul

8 July 2025; 13:30	Report	Malta	14–22	Netherlands	Beylikdüzü Swimming Pool, Istanbul
8 July 2025; 13:30	Report	Score by quarters: 3–6, 4–5, 2–6, 5–5			Beylikdüzü Swimming Pool, Istanbul

9 July 2025; 10:00	Report	Malta	14–11	Moldova	Beylikdüzü Swimming Pool, Istanbul
9 July 2025; 10:00	Report	Score by quarters: 4–2, 2–3, 4–2, 4–4			Beylikdüzü Swimming Pool, Istanbul

9 July 2025; 11:45	Report	Netherlands	16–8	Georgia	Beylikdüzü Swimming Pool, Istanbul
9 July 2025; 11:45	Report	Score by quarters: 4–1, 4–4, 4–2, 4–1			Beylikdüzü Swimming Pool, Istanbul

==== Group D ====
Pos	Team	Pld	W	PSW	PSL	L	GF	GA	GD	Pts	Qualification
1	Germany	2	2	0	0	0	43	17	+26	6	Crossovers
2	Romania	2	1	0	0	1	29	23	+6	3	Crossovers
3	Poland	2	0	0	0	2	13	45	−32	0	13th–15th place classification

Source: microplustimingservices.com
Rules for classification: 1) points; 2) head-to-head points; 3) head-to-head goal difference; 4) head-to-head number of goals scored; 5) Goal difference.

7 July 2025; 13:30	Report	Germany	27–6	Poland	Beylikdüzü Swimming Pool, Istanbul
7 July 2025; 13:30	Report	Score by quarters: 3–3, 7–2, 8–1, 9–0			Beylikdüzü Swimming Pool, Istanbul

8 July 2025; 10:00	Report	Romania	18–7	Poland	Beylikdüzü Swimming Pool, Istanbul
8 July 2025; 10:00	Report	Score by quarters: 4–2, 2–3, 8–1, 4–1			Beylikdüzü Swimming Pool, Istanbul

9 July 2025; 13:30	Report	Germany	16–11	Romania	Beylikdüzü Swimming Pool, Istanbul
9 July 2025; 13:30	Report	Score by quarters: 2–3, 4–3, 6–3, 4–2			Beylikdüzü Swimming Pool, Istanbul

== 13th–15th place classification ==
Pos	Team	Pld	W	PSW	PSL	L	GF	GA	GD	Pts
13	Poland	2	1	0	0	1	28	27	+1	3
14	Malta	2	1	0	0	1	27	27	0	3
15	Moldova	2	1	0	0	1	22	23	−1	3

Source: microplustimingservices.com
Rules for classification: 1) points; 2) head-to-head points; 3) head-to-head goal difference; 4) head-to-head number of goals scored; 5) Goal difference.

11 July 2025; 10:00	Report	Malta	14–18	Poland	Beylikdüzü Swimming Pool, Istanbul
11 July 2025; 10:00	Report	Score by quarters: 2–6, 5–5, 5–5, 2–2			Beylikdüzü Swimming Pool, Istanbul

12 July 2025; 10:00	Report	Moldova	13–10	Poland	Beylikdüzü Swimming Pool, Istanbul
12 July 2025; 10:00	Report	Score by quarters: 4–2, 2–3, 4–2, 3–3			Beylikdüzü Swimming Pool, Istanbul

13 July 2025; 13:30	Report	Malta	13–9	Moldova	Beylikdüzü Swimming Pool, Istanbul
13 July 2025; 13:30	Report	Score by quarters: 1–2, 4–0, 4–5, 4–2			Beylikdüzü Swimming Pool, Istanbul

== Brackets ==
=== Main bracket ===
Crossovers
10 July
A4 Turkey	15
C1 Netherlands	12
10 July
B3 Montenegro	13
D2 Romania	7
10 July
A3 Hungary	14
C2 Georgia	4
10 July
B4 Croatia	17
D1 Germany	11

Quarterfinals
11 July
B1 Italy	22
A4 Turkey	9
11 July
A2 Spain	14
B3 Montenegro	18
11 July
B2 Greece	9
A3 Hungary	13
11 July
A1 Serbia	13
B4 Croatia	15

Semifinals
12 July
B1 Italy	13
B3 Montenegro	12
12 July
A3 Hungary	16
B4 Croatia	14

Final
13 July
B1 Italy	20
A3 Hungary	12
Third place game
13 July
B3 Montenegro	12
B4 Croatia	7

=== 5th place bracket ===
5th–8th place semifinals
12 July
A4 Turkey	11
A2 Spain	17
12 July
B2 Greece	19
A1 Serbia	18

Fifth place game
13 July
A2 Spain	11
B2 Greece	14
Seventh place game
13 July
A4 Turkey	12
A1 Serbia	21

=== 9th place bracket ===
9th–12th place semifinals
11 July
C1 Netherlands	15
D2 Romania	8
11 July
C2 Georgia	6
D1 Germany	17

Ninth place game
12 July
C1 Netherlands	9
D1 Germany	17
Eleventh place game
12 July
D2 Romania	10
C2 Georgia	7

== Knockout stage ==
=== Crossovers ===
10 July 2025; 14:30	Report	Croatia	17–11	Germany	Beylikdüzü Swimming Pool, Istanbul
10 July 2025; 14:30	Report	Score by quarters: 5–2, 5–2, 3–4, 4–3			Beylikdüzü Swimming Pool, Istanbul

10 July 2025; 16:15	Report	Montenegro	13–7	Romania	Beylikdüzü Swimming Pool, Istanbul
10 July 2025; 16:15	Report	Score by quarters: 3–2, 4–0, 4–2, 2–3			Beylikdüzü Swimming Pool, Istanbul

10 July 2025; 18:00	Report	Hungary	14–4	Georgia	Beylikdüzü Swimming Pool, Istanbul
10 July 2025; 18:00	Report	Score by quarters: 2–2, 5–1, 3–1, 4–0			Beylikdüzü Swimming Pool, Istanbul

10 July 2025; 19:45	Report	Turkey	15–12	Netherlands	Beylikdüzü Swimming Pool, Istanbul
10 July 2025; 19:45	Report	Score by quarters: 3–1, 4–2, 4–3, 4–6			Beylikdüzü Swimming Pool, Istanbul

=== 9th–12th place semifinals ===
11 July 2025; 11:45	Report	Netherlands	15–8	Romania	Beylikdüzü Swimming Pool, Istanbul
11 July 2025; 11:45	Report	Score by quarters: 4–3, 3–2, 3–1, 5–2			Beylikdüzü Swimming Pool, Istanbul

11 July 2025; 13:30	Report	Georgia	6–17	Germany	Beylikdüzü Swimming Pool, Istanbul
11 July 2025; 13:30	Report	Score by quarters: 0–2, 3–3, 2–7, 1–5			Beylikdüzü Swimming Pool, Istanbul

==== Eleventh place game ====
12 July 2025; 11:45	Report	Romania	10–7	Georgia	Beylikdüzü Swimming Pool, Istanbul
12 July 2025; 11:45	Report	Score by quarters: 1–2, 3–2, 3–1, 3–2			Beylikdüzü Swimming Pool, Istanbul

==== Ninth place game ====
12 July 2025; 13:30	Report	Netherlands	9–17	Germany	Beylikdüzü Swimming Pool, Istanbul
12 July 2025; 13:30	Report	Score by quarters: 2–6, 2–3, 1–5, 4–3			Beylikdüzü Swimming Pool, Istanbul

=== Quarterfinals ===
11 July 2025; 15:30	Report	Italy	22–9	Turkey	Beylikdüzü Swimming Pool, Istanbul
11 July 2025; 15:30	Report	Score by quarters: 5–2, 6–3, 5–1, 6–3			Beylikdüzü Swimming Pool, Istanbul

11 July 2025; 17:15	Report	Greece	9–13	Hungary	Beylikdüzü Swimming Pool, Istanbul
11 July 2025; 17:15	Report	Score by quarters: 2–2, 0–2, 3–6, 4–3			Beylikdüzü Swimming Pool, Istanbul

11 July 2025; 19:00	Report	Serbia	13–15	Croatia	Beylikdüzü Swimming Pool, Istanbul
11 July 2025; 19:00	Report	Score by quarters: 4–4, 4–3, 2–4, 3–4			Beylikdüzü Swimming Pool, Istanbul

11 July 2025; 20:45	Report	Spain	14–18	Montenegro	Beylikdüzü Swimming Pool, Istanbul
11 July 2025; 20:45	Report	Score by quarters: 4–4, 2–5, 5–3, 3–6			Beylikdüzü Swimming Pool, Istanbul

=== 5th–8th place semifinals ===
12 July 2025; 15:30	Report	Turkey	11–17	Spain	Beylikdüzü Swimming Pool, Istanbul
12 July 2025; 15:30	Report	Score by quarters: 3–5, 3–5, 3–4, 2–3			Beylikdüzü Swimming Pool, Istanbul

12 July 2025; 17:15	Report	Greece	19–18 (PSO)	Serbia	Beylikdüzü Swimming Pool, Istanbul
12 July 2025; 17:15	Report	Score by quarters: 4–3, 1–4, 2–2, 7–5 PSO: 5–4			Beylikdüzü Swimming Pool, Istanbul

==== Seventh place game ====
13 July 2025; 15:15	Report	Turkey	12–21	Serbia	Beylikdüzü Swimming Pool, Istanbul
13 July 2025; 15:15	Report	Score by quarters: 3–6, 2–2, 1–6, 6–7			Beylikdüzü Swimming Pool, Istanbul

==== Fifth place game ====
13 July 2025; 17:00	Report	Spain	11–14	Greece	Beylikdüzü Swimming Pool, Istanbul
13 July 2025; 17:00	Report	Score by quarters: 2–3, 4–4, 4–3, 1–4			Beylikdüzü Swimming Pool, Istanbul

=== Semifinals ===
12 July 2025; 19:00	Report	Italy	13–12	Montenegro	Beylikdüzü Swimming Pool, Istanbul
12 July 2025; 19:00	Report	Score by quarters: 6–5, 3–3, 3–2, 1–2			Beylikdüzü Swimming Pool, Istanbul

12 July 2025; 20:45	Report	Hungary	16–14 (PSO)	Croatia	Beylikdüzü Swimming Pool, Istanbul
12 July 2025; 20:45	Report	Score by quarters: 5–2, 4–5, 0–3, 2–1 PSO: 5–3			Beylikdüzü Swimming Pool, Istanbul

==== Third place game ====
13 July 2025; 18:45	Report	Montenegro	12–7	Croatia	Beylikdüzü Swimming Pool, Istanbul
13 July 2025; 18:45	Report	Score by quarters: 4–2, 3–2, 2–1, 3–2			Beylikdüzü Swimming Pool, Istanbul

==== Final ====
13 July 2025; 20:30	Report	Italy	20–12	Hungary	Beylikdüzü Swimming Pool, Istanbul
13 July 2025; 20:30	Report	Score by quarters: 6–1, 6–3, 2–3, 6–5			Beylikdüzü Swimming Pool, Istanbul

== Final standings ==
Rank	Team
1st place, gold medalist(s)	Italy
2nd place, silver medalist(s)	Hungary
3rd place, bronze medalist(s)	Montenegro
4	Croatia
5	Greece
6	Spain
7	Serbia
8	Turkey
9	Germany
10	Netherlands
11	Romania
12	Georgia
13	Poland
14	Malta
15	Moldova
WD	~~Israel~~

Relegated to the 2027 Men's European U-16 Water Polo Championship Division I

== See also ==
- 2025 Women's European U-16 Water Polo Championship
- 2025 Men's European U-18 Water Polo Championship
- 2025 Women's European U-18 Water Polo Championship
- 2025 Men's European U-18 Water Polo Championship Division I
