= 2014 Men's European Water Polo Championship =

Season of the European Water Polo Championship

- Official logo

Tournament details
- Host country: Hungary
- Venue: 1 (in 1 host city)
- Dates: 14–27 July
- Teams: 12 (from 1 confederation)

Final positions
- Champions: Serbia
- Runners-up: Hungary
- Third place: Italy
- Fourth place: Montenegro

Tournament statistics
- Matches played: 44
- Goals scored: 819 (18.61 per match)
- Top scorers: (Spain) Albert Español (24 goals)

Awards
- Best player: (Hungary) Denes Varga

The 2014 Men's European Water Polo Championship was held in Budapest from 14–27 July 2014.

== Qualification ==
There were 12 teams in the 2014 championships. They qualified as follows:

- The host nation
- The best five teams from the 2012 European Championships not already qualified as the host nation
- six qualifiers

Event	Date	Location	Vacancies	Qualified
Host nation	–	–	1	Hungary
2012 European Championships	16–29 January 2012	(Netherlands) Eindhoven	5	Serbia; Montenegro; Italy; Germany; Greece
Qualifiers	November 2012 – April 2014	–	6	Croatia; France; Georgia; Romania; Russia; Spain

== Championships ==
The structure of the championships is that there were two groups of six teams followed by a knockout phase. The first three teams in each group qualified to compete for the championship, with the first-place teams given a bye to the semifinals. The last three teams in each group played a classification tournament for 7th–12th place.

== Draw ==
The draw was held on 9 March 2014.

=== Groups ===
Group A	Group B
Montenegro; Italy; Greece; Romania; Russia; Georgia	Serbia; Hungary; Germany; Croatia; France; Spain

== Preliminary round ==
The schedule was announced on 10 May 2014.

Team advances to Semifinals
Team advances to Quarterfinals
Team competes in placement matches

=== Group A ===
Team	G	W	D	L	GF	GA	Diff	Points
Montenegro	5	4	1	0	62	29	+33	13
Italy	5	3	2	0	52	30	+22	11
Greece	5	3	1	1	52	41	+11	10
Romania	5	2	0	3	43	46	−3	6
Russia	5	1	0	4	43	63	−20	3
Georgia	5	0	0	5	31	74	−43	0

14 July 2014; 13:00	Report	Romania	11–6	Georgia	Alfréd Hajós National Swimming Stadium, Budapest; Referees: Ćirić (SRB), Taylor (GBR)
14 July 2014; 13:00	Report	Score by quarters: 3–4, 3–1, 2–0, 3–1			Alfréd Hajós National Swimming Stadium, Budapest; Referees: Ćirić (SRB), Taylor (GBR)
14 July 2014; 13:00	Report	Radu, Negrean 3	Goals	Jelača 3	Alfréd Hajós National Swimming Stadium, Budapest; Referees: Ćirić (SRB), Taylor (GBR)

14 July 2014; 16:00	Report	Montenegro	11–6	Greece	Alfréd Hajós National Swimming Stadium, Budapest; Referees: Bender (GER), Fekete (HUN)
14 July 2014; 16:00	Report	Score by quarters: 1–1, 4–1, 3–2, 3–2			Alfréd Hajós National Swimming Stadium, Budapest; Referees: Bender (GER), Fekete (HUN)
14 July 2014; 16:00	Report	Ivović 3	Goals	Fountoulis, Vlachopoulos 2	Alfréd Hajós National Swimming Stadium, Budapest; Referees: Bender (GER), Fekete (HUN)

14 July 2014; 19:00	Report	Italy	13–6	Russia	Alfréd Hajós National Swimming Stadium, Budapest; Referees: Koryzna (POL), Teixidó (ESP)
14 July 2014; 19:00	Report	Score by quarters: 3–1, 4–3, 4–1, 2–1			Alfréd Hajós National Swimming Stadium, Budapest; Referees: Koryzna (POL), Teixidó (ESP)
14 July 2014; 19:00	Report	Giorgetti 4	Goals	Stepanyuk, Shepelev 2	Alfréd Hajós National Swimming Stadium, Budapest; Referees: Koryzna (POL), Teixidó (ESP)

15 July 2014; 11:30	Report	Georgia	6–15	Greece	Alfréd Hajós National Swimming Stadium, Budapest; Referees: Galindo (ESP), Dutilh-Dumas (NED)
15 July 2014; 11:30	Report	Score by quarters: 1–4, 1–6, 3–3, 1–2			Alfréd Hajós National Swimming Stadium, Budapest; Referees: Galindo (ESP), Dutilh-Dumas (NED)
15 July 2014; 11:30	Report	Franičević 2	Goals	Fountoulis 6	Alfréd Hajós National Swimming Stadium, Budapest; Referees: Galindo (ESP), Dutilh-Dumas (NED)

15 July 2014; 14:30	Report	Russia	7–15	Montenegro	Alfréd Hajós National Swimming Stadium, Budapest; Referees: Koryzna (POL), Mercier (FRA)
15 July 2014; 14:30	Report	Score by quarters: 1–5, 2–3, 2–4, 2–3			Alfréd Hajós National Swimming Stadium, Budapest; Referees: Koryzna (POL), Mercier (FRA)
15 July 2014; 14:30	Report	Timakov 3	Goals	Ivović, Klikovac 3	Alfréd Hajós National Swimming Stadium, Budapest; Referees: Koryzna (POL), Mercier (FRA)

15 July 2014; 16:00	Report	Romania	4–9	Italy	Alfréd Hajós National Swimming Stadium, Budapest; Referees: Margeta (SLO), Franulović (CRO)
15 July 2014; 16:00	Report	Score by quarters: 1–1, 1–3, 1–4, 1–1			Alfréd Hajós National Swimming Stadium, Budapest; Referees: Margeta (SLO), Franulović (CRO)
15 July 2014; 16:00	Report	Gheorghe 2	Goals	Giorgetti, Luongo 2	Alfréd Hajós National Swimming Stadium, Budapest; Referees: Margeta (SLO), Franulović (CRO)

17 July 2014; 11:30	Report	Italy	15–5	Georgia	Alfréd Hajós National Swimming Stadium, Budapest; Referees: Taylor (GBR), Bender (GER)
17 July 2014; 11:30	Report	Score by quarters: 3–2, 5–1, 5–1, 2–1			Alfréd Hajós National Swimming Stadium, Budapest; Referees: Taylor (GBR), Bender (GER)
17 July 2014; 11:30	Report	Figari, Aicardi 3	Goals	Jelača 2	Alfréd Hajós National Swimming Stadium, Budapest; Referees: Taylor (GBR), Bender (GER)

17 July 2014; 16:00	Report	Greece	12–6	Russia	Alfréd Hajós National Swimming Stadium, Budapest; Referees: Koryzna (POL), Margeta (SLO)
17 July 2014; 16:00	Report	Score by quarters: 3–1, 3–3, 1–1, 5–1			Alfréd Hajós National Swimming Stadium, Budapest; Referees: Koryzna (POL), Margeta (SLO)
17 July 2014; 16:00	Report	Mourikis 3	Goals	Stepanyuk 4	Alfréd Hajós National Swimming Stadium, Budapest; Referees: Koryzna (POL), Margeta (SLO)

17 July 2014; 19:00	Report	Montenegro	13–8	Romania	Alfréd Hajós National Swimming Stadium, Budapest; Referees: Koganov (AZE), Galindo (ESP)
17 July 2014; 19:00	Report	Score by quarters: 2–2, 3–0, 5–2, 3–4			Alfréd Hajós National Swimming Stadium, Budapest; Referees: Koganov (AZE), Galindo (ESP)
17 July 2014; 19:00	Report	M. Janović, N. Janović 3	Goals	Negrean 4	Alfréd Hajós National Swimming Stadium, Budapest; Referees: Koganov (AZE), Galindo (ESP)

19 July 2014; 13:00	Report	Georgia	12–16	Russia	Alfréd Hajós National Swimming Stadium, Budapest; Referees: Mercier (FRA), Bender (GER)
19 July 2014; 13:00	Report	Score by quarters: 3–3, 1–4, 7–4, 1–5			Alfréd Hajós National Swimming Stadium, Budapest; Referees: Mercier (FRA), Bender (GER)
19 July 2014; 13:00	Report	Tsrepulia, Elez 4	Goals	Nagaev, Stepanyuk 4	Alfréd Hajós National Swimming Stadium, Budapest; Referees: Mercier (FRA), Bender (GER)

19 July 2014; 14:30	Report	Romania	9–10	Greece	Alfréd Hajós National Swimming Stadium, Budapest; Referees: Koganov (AZE), Fekete (HUN)
19 July 2014; 14:30	Report	Score by quarters: 3–2, 2–3, 2–2, 2–3			Alfréd Hajós National Swimming Stadium, Budapest; Referees: Koganov (AZE), Fekete (HUN)
19 July 2014; 14:30	Report	Diaconu 4	Goals	three players 2	Alfréd Hajós National Swimming Stadium, Budapest; Referees: Koganov (AZE), Fekete (HUN)

19 July 2014; 19:00	Report	Italy	6–6	Montenegro	Alfréd Hajós National Swimming Stadium, Budapest; Referees: Koryzna (POL), Schwartz (ISR)
19 July 2014; 19:00	Report	Score by quarters: 2–0, 0–1, 2–3, 2–2			Alfréd Hajós National Swimming Stadium, Budapest; Referees: Koryzna (POL), Schwartz (ISR)
19 July 2014; 19:00	Report	Fondelli 3	Goals	N. Janović, Ivović 2	Alfréd Hajós National Swimming Stadium, Budapest; Referees: Koryzna (POL), Schwartz (ISR)

21 July 2014; 11:30	Report	Montenegro	17–2	Georgia	Alfréd Hajós National Swimming Stadium, Budapest; Referees: Varkonyi (HUN), Mercier (FRA)
21 July 2014; 11:30	Report	Score by quarters: 4–0, 4–0, 4–1, 5–1			Alfréd Hajós National Swimming Stadium, Budapest; Referees: Varkonyi (HUN), Mercier (FRA)
21 July 2014; 11:30	Report	Ivović 6	Goals	Elez 2	Alfréd Hajós National Swimming Stadium, Budapest; Referees: Varkonyi (HUN), Mercier (FRA)

21 July 2014; 13:00	Report	Russia	8–11	Romania	Alfréd Hajós National Swimming Stadium, Budapest; Referees: Franulović (CRO), Fekete (HUN)
21 July 2014; 13:00	Report	Score by quarters: 2–3, 1–3, 2–3, 3–2			Alfréd Hajós National Swimming Stadium, Budapest; Referees: Franulović (CRO), Fekete (HUN)
21 July 2014; 13:00	Report	Kholod 3	Goals	Negrean 5	Alfréd Hajós National Swimming Stadium, Budapest; Referees: Franulović (CRO), Fekete (HUN)

21 July 2014; 19:00	Report	Greece	9–9	Italy	Alfréd Hajós National Swimming Stadium, Budapest; Referees: Teixidó (ESP), Margeta (SLO)
21 July 2014; 19:00	Report	Score by quarters: 4–2, 0–4, 3–2, 2–1			Alfréd Hajós National Swimming Stadium, Budapest; Referees: Teixidó (ESP), Margeta (SLO)
21 July 2014; 19:00	Report	Vlachopoulos 3	Goals	three players 2	Alfréd Hajós National Swimming Stadium, Budapest; Referees: Teixidó (ESP), Margeta (SLO)

=== Group B ===
Team	G	W	D	L	GF	GA	Diff	Points
Hungary	5	5	0	0	55	36	+19	15
Serbia	5	3	1	1	50	34	+16	10
Croatia	5	2	2	1	46	39	+7	8
Spain	5	2	1	2	47	41	+6	7
France	5	1	0	4	36	62	−26	3
Germany	5	0	0	5	35	57	−22	0

14 July 2014; 11:30	Report	Croatia	10–5	Germany	Alfréd Hajós National Swimming Stadium, Budapest; Referees: Schwartz (ISR), Bianchi (ITA)
14 July 2014; 11:30	Report	Score by quarters: 4–3, 2–0, 3–0, 1–2			Alfréd Hajós National Swimming Stadium, Budapest; Referees: Schwartz (ISR), Bianchi (ITA)
14 July 2014; 11:30	Report	three players 2	Goals	Schüler 2	Alfréd Hajós National Swimming Stadium, Budapest; Referees: Schwartz (ISR), Bianchi (ITA)

14 July 2014; 14:30	Report	France	5–16	Serbia	Alfréd Hajós National Swimming Stadium, Budapest; Referees: Toygarli (TUR), Alexandrescu (ROU)
14 July 2014; 14:30	Report	Score by quarters: 1–4, 1–3, 0–3, 3–6			Alfréd Hajós National Swimming Stadium, Budapest; Referees: Toygarli (TUR), Alexandrescu (ROU)
14 July 2014; 14:30	Report	Bodegas, Camarasa 2	Goals	Nikić 4	Alfréd Hajós National Swimming Stadium, Budapest; Referees: Toygarli (TUR), Alexandrescu (ROU)

14 July 2014; 20:30	Report	Spain	9–12	Hungary	Alfréd Hajós National Swimming Stadium, Budapest; Referees: Naumov (RUS), Abramović (MNE)
14 July 2014; 20:30	Report	Score by quarters: 2–2, 2–4, 2–3, 3–3			Alfréd Hajós National Swimming Stadium, Budapest; Referees: Naumov (RUS), Abramović (MNE)
14 July 2014; 20:30	Report	Mallarach 3	Goals	Varga 5	Alfréd Hajós National Swimming Stadium, Budapest; Referees: Naumov (RUS), Abramović (MNE)

15 July 2014; 13:00	Report	Germany	7–12	Serbia	Alfréd Hajós National Swimming Stadium, Budapest; Referees: Taccini (ITA), Stavridis (GRE)
15 July 2014; 13:00	Report	Score by quarters: 2–3, 1–3, 2–3, 2–3			Alfréd Hajós National Swimming Stadium, Budapest; Referees: Taccini (ITA), Stavridis (GRE)
15 July 2014; 13:00	Report	Real, Nossek 2	Goals	Filipović 4	Alfréd Hajós National Swimming Stadium, Budapest; Referees: Taccini (ITA), Stavridis (GRE)

15 July 2014; 19:00	Report	Croatia	8–8	Spain	Alfréd Hajós National Swimming Stadium, Budapest; Referees: Koganov (AZE), Naumov (RUS)
15 July 2014; 19:00	Report	Score by quarters: 3–2, 2–2, 1–2, 2–2			Alfréd Hajós National Swimming Stadium, Budapest; Referees: Koganov (AZE), Naumov (RUS)
15 July 2014; 19:00	Report	Joković 3	Goals	Minguell 4	Alfréd Hajós National Swimming Stadium, Budapest; Referees: Koganov (AZE), Naumov (RUS)

15 July 2014; 20:30	Report	Hungary	12–7	France	Alfréd Hajós National Swimming Stadium, Budapest; Referees: Kikalishvili (GEO), Toygarli (TUR)
15 July 2014; 20:30	Report	Score by quarters: 2–2, 2–1, 5–1, 3–3			Alfréd Hajós National Swimming Stadium, Budapest; Referees: Kikalishvili (GEO), Toygarli (TUR)
15 July 2014; 20:30	Report	Varga 3	Goals	Bodegas 3	Alfréd Hajós National Swimming Stadium, Budapest; Referees: Kikalishvili (GEO), Toygarli (TUR)

17 July 2014; 13:00	Report	France	11–14	Croatia	Alfréd Hajós National Swimming Stadium, Budapest; Referees: Dreval (RUS), Abramović (MNE)
17 July 2014; 13:00	Report	Score by quarters: 3–5, 2–3, 3–2, 3–4			Alfréd Hajós National Swimming Stadium, Budapest; Referees: Dreval (RUS), Abramović (MNE)
17 July 2014; 13:00	Report	Simon, Bodegas 3	Goals	Joković 5	Alfréd Hajós National Swimming Stadium, Budapest; Referees: Dreval (RUS), Abramović (MNE)

17 July 2014; 14:30	Report	Spain	11–8	Germany	Alfréd Hajós National Swimming Stadium, Budapest; Referees: Schwartz (ISR), Stavropoulos (GRE)
17 July 2014; 14:30	Report	Score by quarters: 2–1, 3–2, 3–4, 3–1			Alfréd Hajós National Swimming Stadium, Budapest; Referees: Schwartz (ISR), Stavropoulos (GRE)
17 July 2014; 14:30	Report	Minguell 3	Goals	Nossek 4	Alfréd Hajós National Swimming Stadium, Budapest; Referees: Schwartz (ISR), Stavropoulos (GRE)

17 July 2014; 20:30	Report	Serbia	6–8	Hungary	Alfréd Hajós National Swimming Stadium, Budapest; Referees: Bianchi (ITA), Alexandrescu (ROU)
17 July 2014; 20:30	Report	Score by quarters: 0–2, 3–3, 2–2, 1–1			Alfréd Hajós National Swimming Stadium, Budapest; Referees: Bianchi (ITA), Alexandrescu (ROU)
17 July 2014; 20:30	Report	Filipović, Mitrović 2	Goals	three players 2	Alfréd Hajós National Swimming Stadium, Budapest; Referees: Bianchi (ITA), Alexandrescu (ROU)

19 July 2014; 11:30	Report	Spain	13–5	France	Alfréd Hajós National Swimming Stadium, Budapest; Referees: Abramović (MNE), Bianchi (ITA)
19 July 2014; 11:30	Report	Score by quarters: 2–0, 3–3, 4–2, 4–0			Alfréd Hajós National Swimming Stadium, Budapest; Referees: Abramović (MNE), Bianchi (ITA)
19 July 2014; 11:30	Report	Español 5	Goals	Bodegas 2	Alfréd Hajós National Swimming Stadium, Budapest; Referees: Abramović (MNE), Bianchi (ITA)

19 July 2014; 16:00	Report	Croatia	8–8	Serbia	Alfréd Hajós National Swimming Stadium, Budapest; Referees: Naumov (RUS), Stavridis (GRE)
19 July 2014; 16:00	Report	Score by quarters: 2–3, 3–2, 1–2, 2–1			Alfréd Hajós National Swimming Stadium, Budapest; Referees: Naumov (RUS), Stavridis (GRE)
19 July 2014; 16:00	Report	Sukno 3	Goals	Filipović 4	Alfréd Hajós National Swimming Stadium, Budapest; Referees: Naumov (RUS), Stavridis (GRE)

19 July 2014; 20:30	Report	Germany	8–16	Hungary	Alfréd Hajós National Swimming Stadium, Budapest; Referees: Toygaru (TUR), Margeta (SLO)
19 July 2014; 20:30	Report	Score by quarters: 3–4, 4–5, 0–3, 1–4			Alfréd Hajós National Swimming Stadium, Budapest; Referees: Toygaru (TUR), Margeta (SLO)
19 July 2014; 20:30	Report	three players 2	Goals	Varga 5	Alfréd Hajós National Swimming Stadium, Budapest; Referees: Toygaru (TUR), Margeta (SLO)

21 July 2014; 14:30	Report	France	8–7	Germany	Alfréd Hajós National Swimming Stadium, Budapest; Referees: Alexandrescu (ROU), Bianchi (ITA)
21 July 2014; 14:30	Report	Score by quarters: 1–0, 0–2, 4–4, 3–1			Alfréd Hajós National Swimming Stadium, Budapest; Referees: Alexandrescu (ROU), Bianchi (ITA)
21 July 2014; 14:30	Report	Marzouki 3	Goals	Nossek, Schüler 2	Alfréd Hajós National Swimming Stadium, Budapest; Referees: Alexandrescu (ROU), Bianchi (ITA)

21 July 2014; 16:00	Report	Serbia	8–6	Spain	Alfréd Hajós National Swimming Stadium, Budapest; Referees: Naumov (RUS), Koryzna (POL)
21 July 2014; 16:00	Report	Score by quarters: 2–2, 1–0, 1–1, 4–3			Alfréd Hajós National Swimming Stadium, Budapest; Referees: Naumov (RUS), Koryzna (POL)
21 July 2014; 16:00	Report	Ćuk 2	Goals	Español 4	Alfréd Hajós National Swimming Stadium, Budapest; Referees: Naumov (RUS), Koryzna (POL)

21 July 2014; 20:30	Report	Hungary	7–6	Croatia	Alfréd Hajós National Swimming Stadium, Budapest; Referees: Stavropoulos (GRE), Koganov (AZE)
21 July 2014; 20:30	Report	Score by quarters: 0–2, 4–2, 1–1, 2–1			Alfréd Hajós National Swimming Stadium, Budapest; Referees: Stavropoulos (GRE), Koganov (AZE)
21 July 2014; 20:30	Report	seven players 1	Goals	Sukno 2	Alfréd Hajós National Swimming Stadium, Budapest; Referees: Stavropoulos (GRE), Koganov (AZE)

== Final round ==
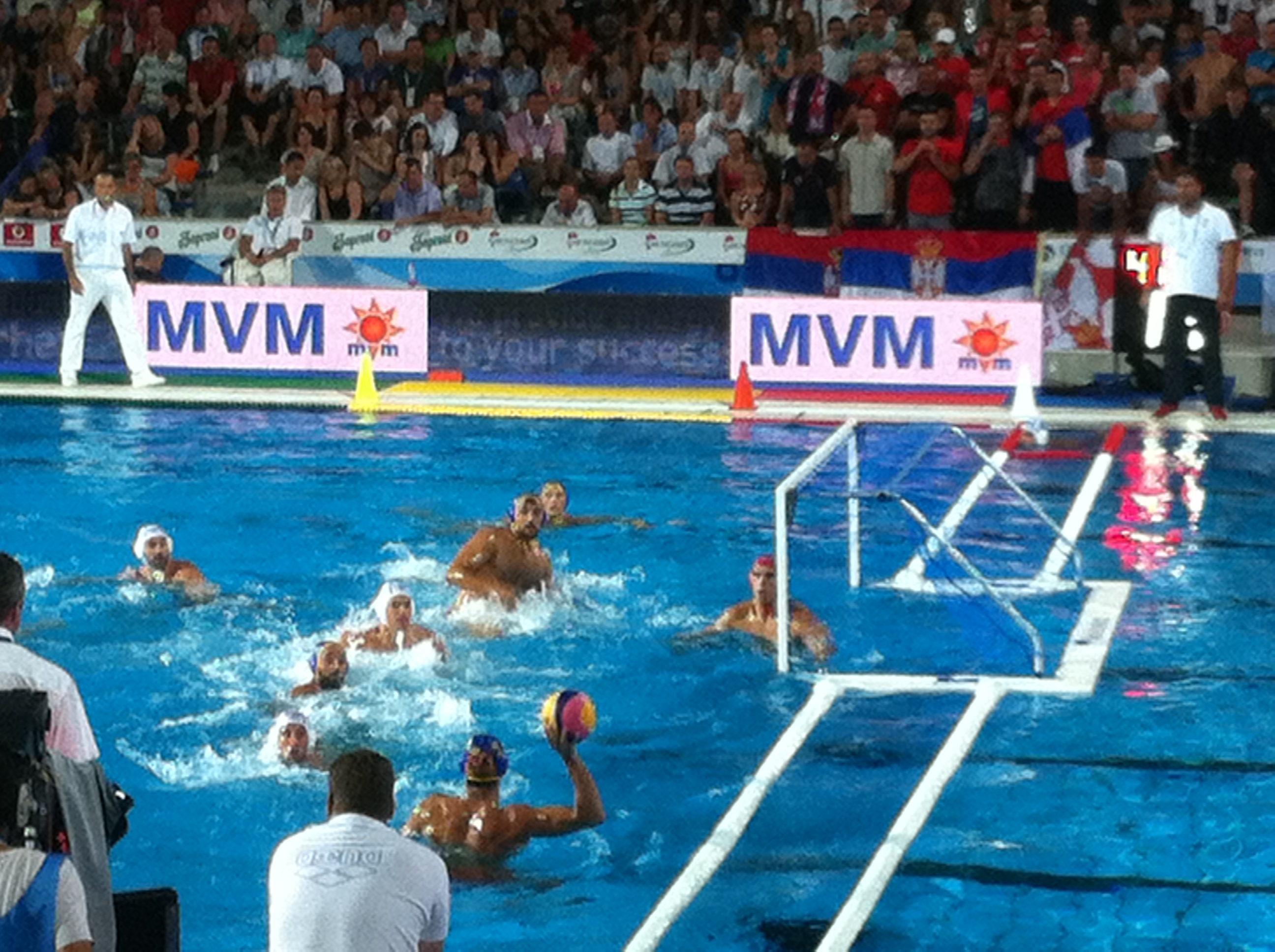
Serbia vs Montenegro semifinal game

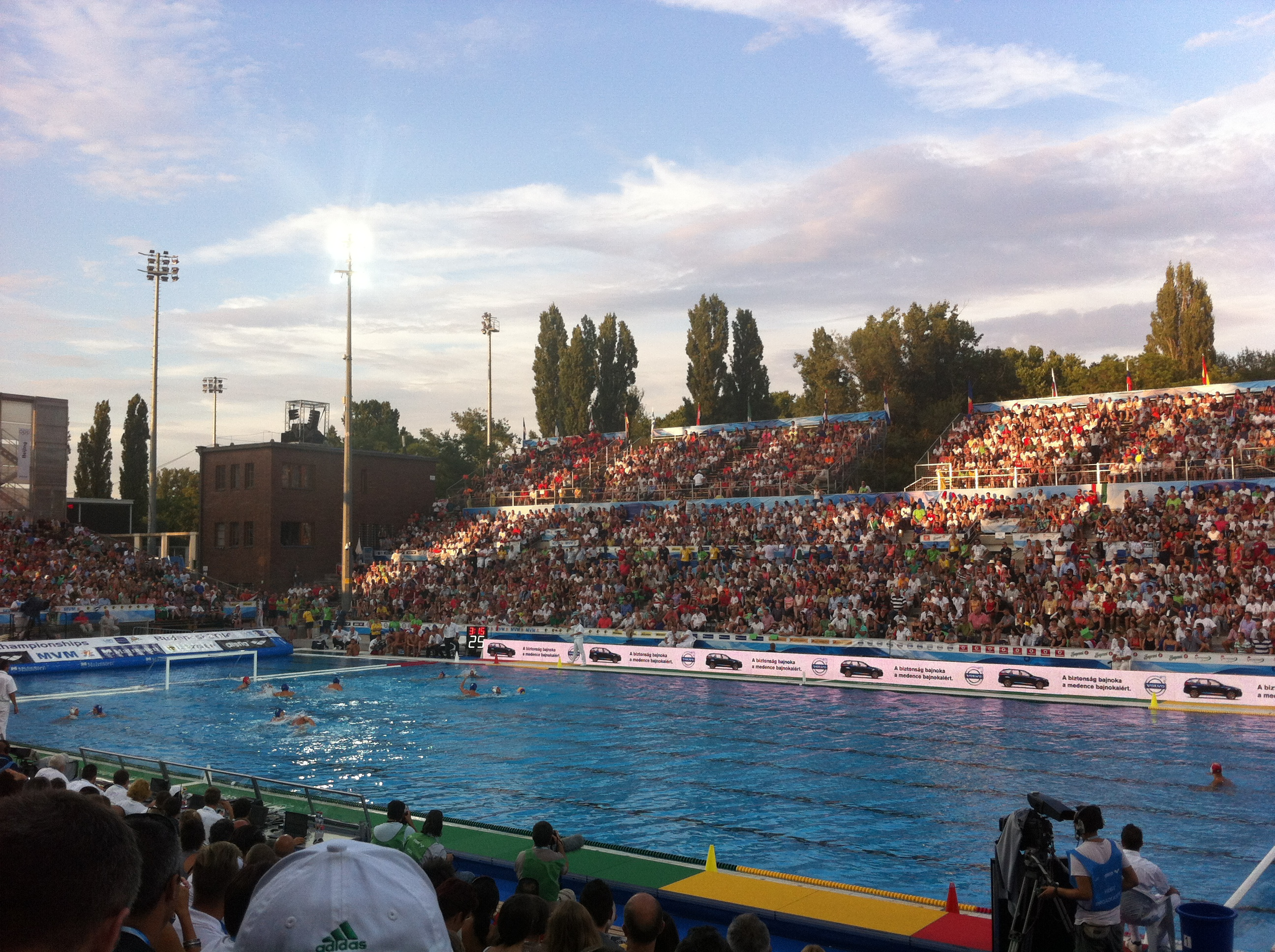
Hungary vs Italy semifinal game

=== Bracket ===
Quarterfinals
A3	Greece	9
B2	Serbia	13
A2	Italy	8
B3	Croatia	7

Semifinals
A1	Montenegro	9
B2	Serbia	10
B1	Hungary	8
A2	Italy	7
5th–6th
A3	Greece	7
B3	Croatia	11

Gold medal game
B2	Serbia	12
B1	Hungary	7
Bronze medal game
A1	Montenegro	9
A2	Italy	11

=== Quarterfinals ===
23 July 2014; 19:00	Report	Italy	8–7	Croatia	Alfréd Hajós National Swimming Stadium, Budapest; Referees: Koganov (AZE), Stavridis (GRE)
23 July 2014; 19:00	Report	Score by quarters: 1–1, 3–2, 2–2, 2–2			Alfréd Hajós National Swimming Stadium, Budapest; Referees: Koganov (AZE), Stavridis (GRE)
23 July 2014; 19:00	Report	Figlioli, Giorgetti 2	Goals	Sukno 3	Alfréd Hajós National Swimming Stadium, Budapest; Referees: Koganov (AZE), Stavridis (GRE)

23 July 2014; 20:30	Report	Greece	9–13	Serbia	Alfréd Hajós National Swimming Stadium, Budapest; Referees: Bender (GER), Koryzna (POL)
23 July 2014; 20:30	Report	Score by quarters: 2–3, 3–4, 2–4, 2–2			Alfréd Hajós National Swimming Stadium, Budapest; Referees: Bender (GER), Koryzna (POL)
23 July 2014; 20:30	Report	Vlachopoulos 4	Goals	five players 2	Alfréd Hajós National Swimming Stadium, Budapest; Referees: Bender (GER), Koryzna (POL)

=== Semifinals ===
25 July 2014; 19:00	Report	Italy	7–8	Hungary	Alfréd Hajós National Swimming Stadium, Budapest; Referees: Alexandrescu (ROU), Margeta (SLO)
25 July 2014; 19:00	Report	Score by quarters: 1–3, 3–2, 1–1, 2–2			Alfréd Hajós National Swimming Stadium, Budapest; Referees: Alexandrescu (ROU), Margeta (SLO)
25 July 2014; 19:00	Report	Gallo 2	Goals	Hosnyánszky 3	Alfréd Hajós National Swimming Stadium, Budapest; Referees: Alexandrescu (ROU), Margeta (SLO)

25 July 2014; 20:30	Report	Serbia	11–9	Montenegro	Alfréd Hajós National Swimming Stadium, Budapest; Referees: Stavridis (GRE), Naumov (RUS)
25 July 2014; 20:30	Report	Score by quarters: 3–5, 1–2, 3–2, 4–0			Alfréd Hajós National Swimming Stadium, Budapest; Referees: Stavridis (GRE), Naumov (RUS)
25 July 2014; 20:30	Report	Mitrović 3	Goals	Janović 3	Alfréd Hajós National Swimming Stadium, Budapest; Referees: Stavridis (GRE), Naumov (RUS)

=== Fifth place game ===
26 July 2014; 13:30	Report	Croatia	11–7	Greece	Alfréd Hajós National Swimming Stadium, Budapest; Referees: Bianchi (ITA), Fekete (HUN)
26 July 2014; 13:30	Report	Score by quarters: 2–3, 3–0, 3–2, 3–2			Alfréd Hajós National Swimming Stadium, Budapest; Referees: Bianchi (ITA), Fekete (HUN)
26 July 2014; 13:30	Report	Joković 3	Goals	Fountoulis 3	Alfréd Hajós National Swimming Stadium, Budapest; Referees: Bianchi (ITA), Fekete (HUN)

=== Bronze medal game ===
27 July 2014; 18:30	Report	Italy	11–9	Montenegro	Alfréd Hajós National Swimming Stadium, Budapest; Referees: Stavridis (GRE), Koganov (AZE)
27 July 2014; 18:30	Report	Score by quarters: 1–3, 5–3, 2–2, 3–1			Alfréd Hajós National Swimming Stadium, Budapest; Referees: Stavridis (GRE), Koganov (AZE)
27 July 2014; 18:30	Report	Giorgetti 4	Goals	M. Janović 3	Alfréd Hajós National Swimming Stadium, Budapest; Referees: Stavridis (GRE), Koganov (AZE)

=== Final ===
27 July 2014; 20:30	Report	Hungary	7–12	Serbia	Alfréd Hajós National Swimming Stadium, Budapest; Referees: Margeta (SLO), Alexandrescu (ROU)
27 July 2014; 20:30	Report	Score by quarters: 1–3, 1–4, 4–2, 1–3			Alfréd Hajós National Swimming Stadium, Budapest; Referees: Margeta (SLO), Alexandrescu (ROU)
27 July 2014; 20:30	Report	Vámos 3	Goals	Gocić 3	Alfréd Hajós National Swimming Stadium, Budapest; Referees: Margeta (SLO), Alexandrescu (ROU)

== 7th–12th Classification ==
=== Bracket ===
Quarterfinals
A6	Georgia	6
B5	France	10
A5	Russia	8
B6	Germany	9

Semifinals
A4	Romania	15
B5	France	8
B4	Spain	16
B6	Germany	8
11th–12th
A6	Georgia	8
A5	Russia	9

7th–8th
A4	Romania	7
B4	Spain	8
9th–10th
B5	France	13
B6	Germany	14

=== 7th–12th Quarterfinals ===
23 July 2014; 16:00	Report	Russia	8–9	Germany	Alfréd Hajós National Swimming Stadium, Budapest; Referees: Franulović (CRO), Bianchi (ITA)
23 July 2014; 16:00	Report	Score by quarters: 1–1, 4–2, 1–3, 2–3			Alfréd Hajós National Swimming Stadium, Budapest; Referees: Franulović (CRO), Bianchi (ITA)
23 July 2014; 16:00	Report	Stepanyuk 3	Goals	Real 2	Alfréd Hajós National Swimming Stadium, Budapest; Referees: Franulović (CRO), Bianchi (ITA)

23 July 2014; 17:30	Report	Georgia	6–10	France	Alfréd Hajós National Swimming Stadium, Budapest; Referees: Fekete (HUN), Ćirić (SRB)
23 July 2014; 17:30	Report	Score by quarters: 2–2, 1–3, 2–3, 1–2			Alfréd Hajós National Swimming Stadium, Budapest; Referees: Fekete (HUN), Ćirić (SRB)
23 July 2014; 17:30	Report	six players 1	Goals	Bodegas 4	Alfréd Hajós National Swimming Stadium, Budapest; Referees: Fekete (HUN), Ćirić (SRB)

=== 7th–12th Semifinals ===
25 July 2014; 14:30	Report	Germany	8–16	Spain	Alfréd Hajós National Swimming Stadium, Budapest; Referees: Fekete (HUN), Koryzna (POL)
25 July 2014; 14:30	Report	Score by quarters: 3–5, 1–4, 2–3, 2–4			Alfréd Hajós National Swimming Stadium, Budapest; Referees: Fekete (HUN), Koryzna (POL)
25 July 2014; 14:30	Report	three players 2	Goals	Español 7	Alfréd Hajós National Swimming Stadium, Budapest; Referees: Fekete (HUN), Koryzna (POL)

25 July 2014; 16:00	Report	France	8–15	Romania	Alfréd Hajós National Swimming Stadium, Budapest; Referees: Toygaru (TUR), Franulović (CRO)
25 July 2014; 16:00	Report	Score by quarters: 3–3, 1–3, 1–6, 3–3			Alfréd Hajós National Swimming Stadium, Budapest; Referees: Toygaru (TUR), Franulović (CRO)
25 July 2014; 16:00	Report	Bodegas 3	Goals	Negrean 5	Alfréd Hajós National Swimming Stadium, Budapest; Referees: Toygaru (TUR), Franulović (CRO)

=== Eleventh place game ===
25 July 2014; 17:30	Report	Russia	9–8	Georgia	Alfréd Hajós National Swimming Stadium, Budapest; Referees: Galindo (ESP), Schwartz (ISR)
25 July 2014; 17:30	Report	Score by quarters: 2–2, 2–2, 2–1, 3–3			Alfréd Hajós National Swimming Stadium, Budapest; Referees: Galindo (ESP), Schwartz (ISR)
25 July 2014; 17:30	Report	Stepanyuk 4	Goals	Elez, Jelaca 2	Alfréd Hajós National Swimming Stadium, Budapest; Referees: Galindo (ESP), Schwartz (ISR)

=== Ninth place game ===
26 July 2014; 10:30	Report	Germany	14–13	France	Alfréd Hajós National Swimming Stadium, Budapest; Referees: Ćirić (SRB), Koryzna (POL)
26 July 2014; 10:30	Report	Score by quarters: 4–3, 4–6, 4–3, 2–1			Alfréd Hajós National Swimming Stadium, Budapest; Referees: Ćirić (SRB), Koryzna (POL)
26 July 2014; 10:30	Report	Nossek 4	Goals	Camarasa 5	Alfréd Hajós National Swimming Stadium, Budapest; Referees: Ćirić (SRB), Koryzna (POL)

=== Seventh place game ===
26 July 2014; 12:00	Report	Spain	8–7	Romania	Alfréd Hajós National Swimming Stadium, Budapest; Referees: Bender (GER), Naumov (RUS)
26 July 2014; 12:00	Report	Score by quarters: 3–1, 1–3, 2–1, 2–2			Alfréd Hajós National Swimming Stadium, Budapest; Referees: Bender (GER), Naumov (RUS)
26 July 2014; 12:00	Report	García 3	Goals	Radu 3	Alfréd Hajós National Swimming Stadium, Budapest; Referees: Bender (GER), Naumov (RUS)

== Statistics ==
=== Final ranking ===
Rank	Team
1st place, gold medalist(s)	Serbia
2nd place, silver medalist(s)	Hungary
3rd place, bronze medalist(s)	Italy
4	Montenegro
5	Croatia
6	Greece
7	Spain
8	Romania
9	Germany
10	France
11	Russia
12	Georgia

2014 Men's European champion

Serbia
Sixth title

Team roster

Gojko Pijetlović, Dušan Mandić, Živko Gocić, Sava Ranđelović, Miloš Ćuk, Duško Pijetlović, Slobodan Nikić, Milan Aleksić, Nikola Rađen, Filip Filipović, Andrija Prlainović, Stefan Mitrović, and Branislav Mitrović
Head coach: Dejan Savić

=== Top goalscorers ===
Rank	Name	Team	Goals	Shots	%
1	Albert Español	Spain	24	51	47.1%
2	Mickael Bodegas	France	20	38	52.6%
2	Konstantin Stepanyuk	Russia	20	38	52.6%
4	Aleksandar Ivović	Montenegro	19	40	47.5%
5	Tiberiu Negrean	Romania	18	41	43.9%
6	Filip Filipović	Serbia	17	34	50%
6	Heiko Nossek	Germany	17	43	39.5%
6	Alex Giorgetti	Italy	17	44	38.6%
9	Ioannis Fountoulis	Greece	16	37	43.2%
10	Cosmin Radu	Romania	14	27	51.9%
10	Sandro Sukno	Croatia	14	38	36.8%
10	Maro Joković	Croatia	14	41	34.1%

== Awards ==
Top Scorer	Player of the Tournament
(Spain) Albert Español	(Hungary) Denes Varga
