= Latvia men's national water polo team =

Latvia
- FINA code: LAT
- Confederation: LEN (Europe)

The Latvia men's national water polo team is the representative for Latvia in international men's water polo.

== History ==
In 2014 during Baltic Water Polo Championships in Vilnius, Lithuania Latvia men's national water polo team won over Ukraine with result 14:10. It was a first Latvia's victory in international matches in 50 years.
