= Bosnia and Herzegovina men's national water polo team =

Bosnia and Herzegovina
- FINA code: BIH
- Association: Water Polo Federation of Bosnia and Herzegovina (est. 2013)
- Confederation: LEN (Europe)
- Head coach: Faris Đugum
- Home venue: Olimpijski Bazen Otoka

The Bosnia and Herzegovina men's national water polo team represents Bosnia and Herzegovina in international water polo competitions and friendly matches. It is governed by the Water Polo Federation of Bosnia and Herzegovina since 2013.

The Bosnia and Herzegovina men's national team's historic first game took place during Sarajevo Champions Challenge 2016 on 23 September 2016.

The player roster is composed of players from clubs from BiH's only coastal city of Neum, and the two largest cities - Sarajevo and Banja Luka. Neum is the only city to be situated along Bosnia and Herzegovina's 20 km (12 mi) of coastline, making it the country's only access to the Adriatic Sea and marking an ideal location for sport expansion.

The Bosnia and Herzegovina national team made its international debut at the 2026 Mediterranean Games in Taranto.

== Results ==
=== First international matches ===
Date	Competition	Round	Venue	Team 1	Result	Team 2
16 Jan. 2009	Unofficial friendly match		Sarajevo, BiH	Bosnia and Herzegovina	12:16	Japan
23 Sep. 2016	Sarajevo Champions Challenge 2016	Group	Sarajevo, BiH	Bosnia and Herzegovina	3:31	(Croatia) VK Jadran Split
24 Sep. 2016	Sarajevo Champions Challenge 2016	Group	Sarajevo, BiH	Bosnia and Herzegovina	3:23	(Montenegro) VK Primorac Kotor
25 Sep. 2016	Sarajevo Champions Challenge 2016	Group	Sarajevo, BiH	Bosnia and Herzegovina	5:22	(Serbia) VK Crvena zvezda

=== Mediterranean Games ===
Year	Position
(Italy) 2026 Taranto	9th

== Current squad ==
Players called up on for 2026 Mediterranean Games.

Bosnia and Herzegovina men's national water polo team at the Mediterranean Games in Taranto.

Head coach: (Bosnia and Herzegovina) Slobodan Grahovac

Assistant Coach: (Bosnia and Herzegovina) Faris Đugum

No.	Name	Pos.
1	Dino Mahovkić	GK
2	Nedim Prašović	
3	Žarko Tomić	
4	Bakir Hadžić	
5	Harun Kazagić	
6	Viktor Glavić	
7	Nikola Hrgović	
8	Stefan Glavić	D
9	Petar Kojčinović	CF
10	Ivo Bačić	
11	Karlo Krmek	
12	Zarije Miladinović	
13	Luka Jagodić	GK
	Harun Beglerović	GK

== Previous squads ==
Players called up on 16 July 2023.

Head coach: (Bosnia and Herzegovina) Dino Džehović

No.	Name	Pos.
1	Harun Beglerović	GK
2	Mato Lovrić	CB
3	Stefan Peter Rost Cvijić	CB
4	Emir Redžepagić	D
5	Isak Zrno	CF
6	Dominik Grbešić	D
7	Luka Glišić	D
8	Stefan Glavić	D
9	Marko Grgurević	D
10	Petar Kojčinović (c)	CF
11	Rijad Čarković	D
12	Matija Rajić	D
13	Milan Čikić	GK
14	Danis Bašić	CB
15	Hamza Pita	D
16	Matija Krupljanin	CF

== Head coaches and Saff ==
Information updated as of 16 July 2023

Assistant Coach: (Bosnia and Herzegovina) Kristian Njavro

Team Doctor: (Bosnia and Herzegovina) Slobodan Grahovac

Secretary: (Bosnia and Herzegovina) Enis Džihanić

Manager: (Bosnia and Herzegovina) Ali Tanović

Head Coaches:

- (Bosnia and Herzegovina) Ivica Bačić (2009)
- (Bosnia and Herzegovina) Slobodan Grahovac (2016–2020)
- (Bosnia and Herzegovina) Dino Džehović (2021-Present)

== Gallery ==
Bosnia and Herzegovina's three main courts for water polo are Olimpijski Bazen Otoka (Sarajevo), Gradski Olimpijski Bazen (Banja Luka), and a water polo court inside the Adriatic Sea water in Neum.

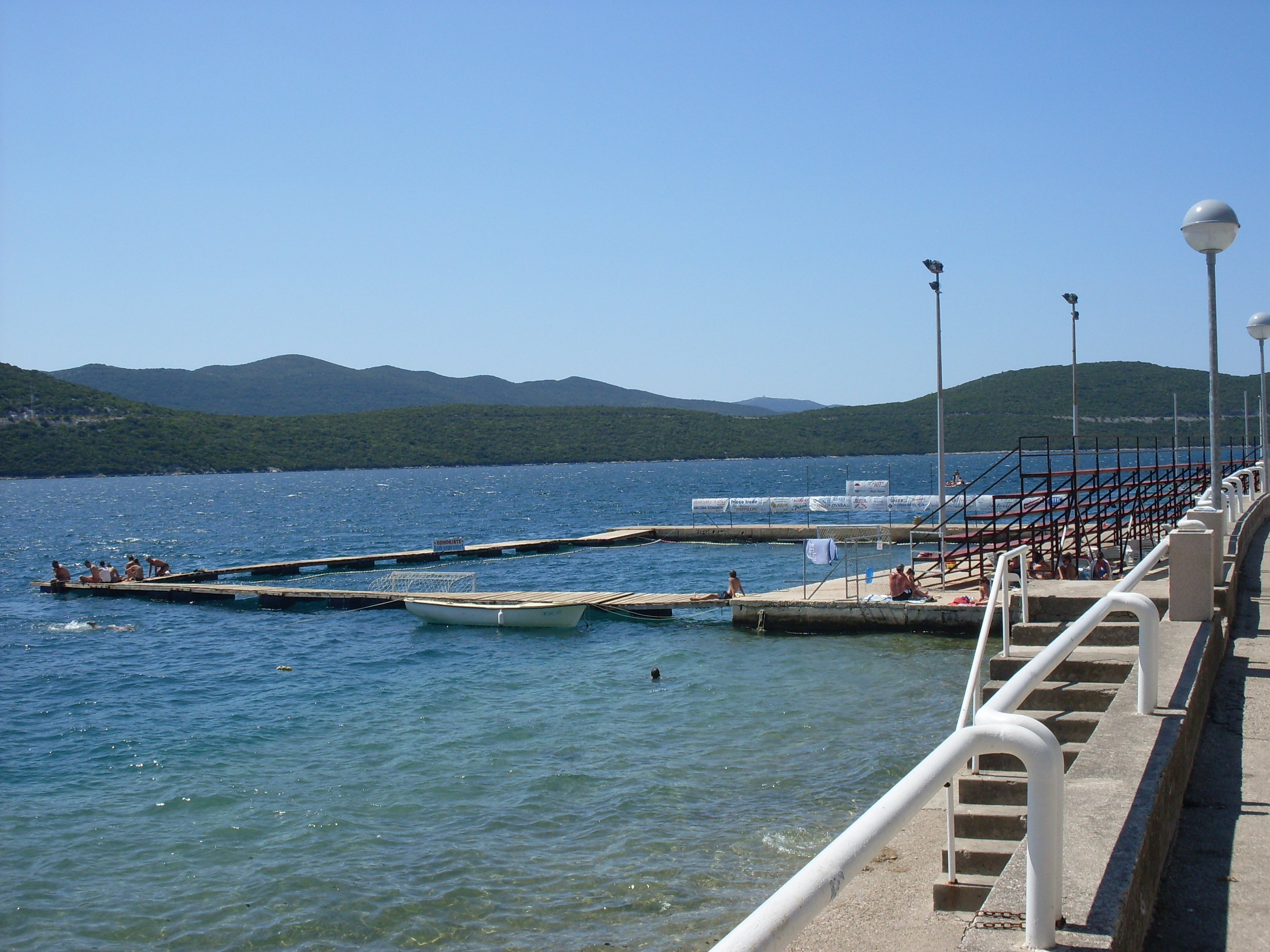
Water polo court in Neum in Herzegovina, home to HVK Jadran Neum

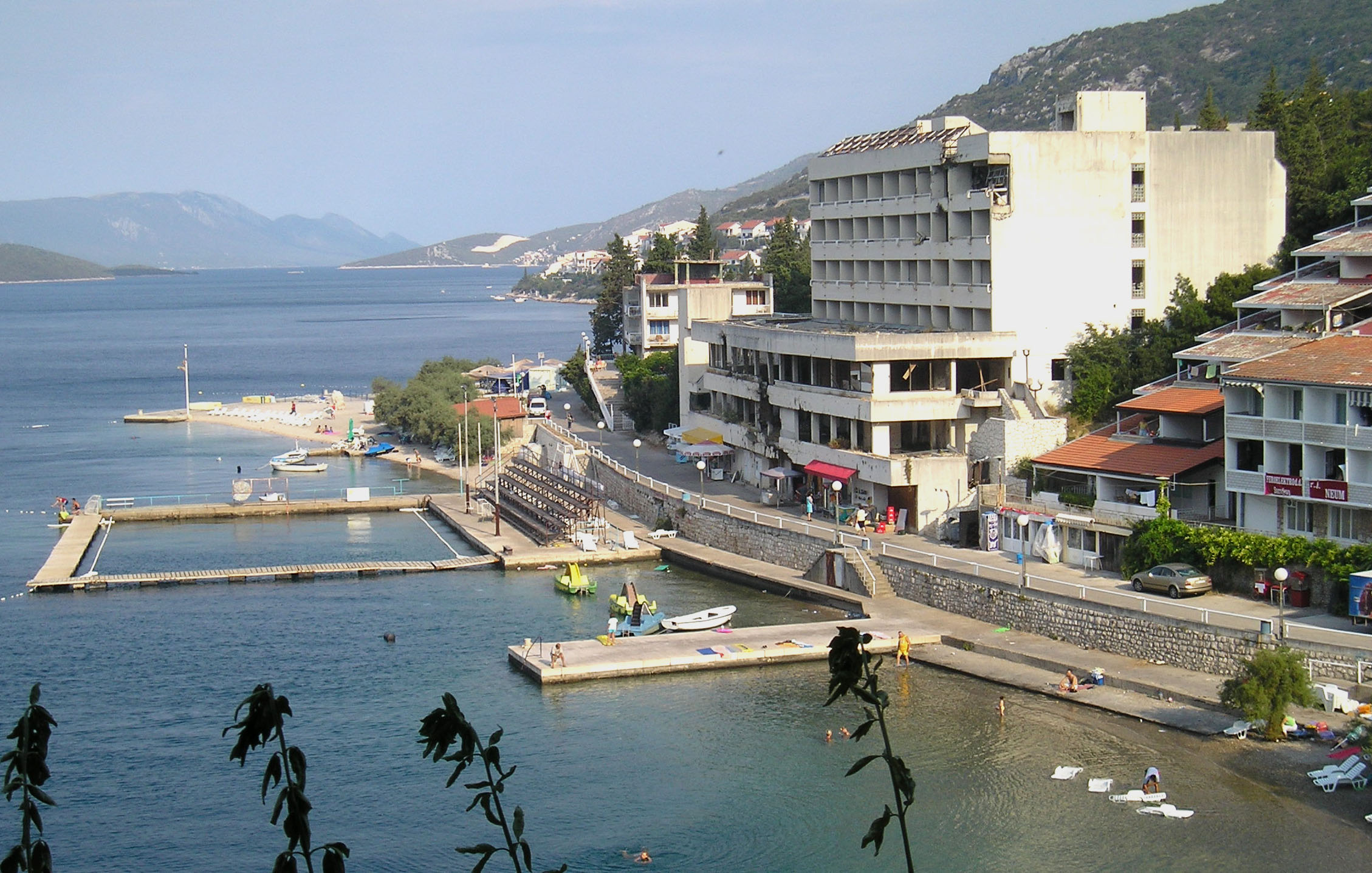
Water polo court in Neum

== See also ==
- Yugoslavia men's national water polo team
- VK Bosna
- Swimming Association of Bosnia and Herzegovina
