= Czech Republic men's national water polo team =

The Czech Republic men's national water polo team represents the Czech Republic in international men's water polo competitions and friendly matches.

The team participated in the first round of the 2018 Men's European Water Polo Championship Qualifiers, held in the Czech Republic. After advancing from the first group, in which Austria, Bulgaria, and Switzerland also competed, they played in the second round of qualifying and subsequent playoffs. The team next entered the qualifiers in 2025 as part of the 2026 Men's European Water Polo Championship Qualifiers.

== Competitions ==
- 2014 Men's European Water Polo Championship Qualifiers
- 2018 Men's European Water Polo Championship Qualifiers
