= Lithuania men's national water polo team =

Lithuania
- FINA code: LTU
- Association: Lietuvos vandensvydžio federacija
- Confederation: LEN (Europe)
- Captain: Jan Bakulo

The Lithuania men's national water polo team is the representative for Lithuania in international men's water polo.

Lithuania men's national water polo team regularly competes in annual Baltic Water Polo Championships.
