= Switzerland men's national water polo team =

Men's national water polo team representing Switzerland

Switzerland
- FINA code: SUI
- Association: Schweizerischer Schwimmverband
- Confederation: LEN (Europe)
- Head coach: Uwe Sterzik
- Captain: Marc Herzog

Olympic Games
- Appearances: 5 (first in 1920)
- Best result: 11th place (1920)

The Switzerland men's national water polo team is the representative for Switzerland in international men's water polo.

== Results ==
=== Olympic Games ===
- 1920 — 11th place
- 1924 — 12th place
- 1928 — 12th place
- 1936 — 12th place
- 1948 — 14th place
