= 2026 Men's European Water Polo Championship Qualifiers =

Tournament details
- Host country: (Slovenia) Kranj (Turkey) Istanbul (Georgia (country)) Tbilisi (Malta) Gzira
- Dates: 8–11 June
- Teams: 18

Tournament statistics
- Matches played: 32
- Goals scored: 953 (29.78 per match)

The 2026 Men's European Water Polo Championship Qualifiers were organised by European Aquatics and held between 8 and 11 June 2025 in four different centralised locations. The qualifiers determined the eight men's water polo national teams that would join the eight automatically qualified teams, including hosts, Serbia, at the final tournament.

== Qualified teams ==
Team	Qualification method	Date of qualification	Appearance(s)				Previous best performance (Note: bold text indicates they hosted that edition.)	Rank
Team	Qualification method	Date of qualification	Total	First	Last	Streak	Previous best performance	Rank
Serbia	Host nation	13 May 2022	31th	1927^{a}	2024	16	Champions (Eight times) (Note: Serbia and Montenegro and Serbia have won in 1991, 2001, 2003, 2006, 2012, 2014, 2016 and 2018)	7
Croatia	Top eight in 2024	8 January 2024	17th	1993	2024	17	Champions (2010, 2022)	2
Hungary	Top eight in 2024	8 January 2024	36th	1926	2024	30	Champions (Thirteen times) (Note: Hungary have won in 1926, 1927, 1931, 1934, 1938, 1954, 1958, 1962, 1974, 1977, 1997, 1999 and 2020.)	3
Italy	Top eight in 2024	8 January 2024	35th	1927	2024	34	Champions (1947, 1993, 1995)	4
Spain	Top eight in 2024	8 January 2024	31st	1927	2024	27	Champions (2024)	1
Montenegro	Top eight in 2024	10 January 2024	10th	2008	2024	10	Champions (2008)	5
Greece	Top eight in 2024	11 January 2024	21st	1970	2024	19	Fourth place (1999, 2016)	6
Romania	Top eight in 2024	11 January 2024	27th	1954	2024	14	Fourth place (1993, 2006)	9
Slovakia	Top two in Group B	9 June 2025	12th	1993	2024	6	Seventh place (2003)	15
Georgia	Top two in Group C	10 June 2025	6th	2016	2024	6	Eighth place (2022)	12
Israel	Top two in Group C	10 June 2025	3rd	2022	2024	3	Twelfth place (2022)	17
Netherlands	Top two in Group A	10 June 2025	31st	1927	2024	6	Champions (1950)	11
Slovenia	Top two in Group A	10 June 2025	6th	1999	2024	3	Eleventh place (1999)	16
France	Top two in Group D	10 June 2025	20th	1927	2024	7	Runners-up (1927)	8
Malta	Top two in Group D	10 June 2025	6th	2016	2024	6	Fourteenth place (2022)	13
Turkey	Top two in Group B	11 June 2025	8th	2016	2020	1	Twelfth place (2020)	14

^{a} Competed as SFR Yugoslavia from 1956 to 1970 and as Serbia and Montenegro from 1998 to 2006, 11 appearances as Serbia since 2006.

== Format ==
The 18 teams were split into four groups of four or five teams. The tournament was played at a single venue with the group winners and the second-ranked teams qualified for the final tournament.

== Draw ==
The draw took place on 3 March 2025 in Zagreb.

=== Seeding ===
Pot 1	Pot 2	Pot 3	Pot 4
France; Georgia **(H)**; Netherlands **(H)**; Germany	Slovakia; Slovenia; Malta **(H)**; Israel	Portugal; Turkey **(H)**; Switzerland; Ukraine; Poland; Finland; Bulgaria; Great Britain	Czechia; Sweden

- Pot 1 with teams ranked from 9th to 12th at 2024 Men's European Water Polo Championship
- Pot 2 with teams ranked from 13th to 16th at 2024 Men's European Water Polo Championship
- Pot 3 with teams eliminated in 2024 Men's European Water Polo Championship Qualifiers
- Pot 4 with teams did not participated to 2024 Men's European Water Polo Championship Qualifiers

=== Draw results ===
Bold text indicates who qualified.

Group A
Team
**Netherlands**
**Slovenia**
Poland
Great Britain
Czechia

Group B
Team
Germany
**Slovakia**
**Turkey**
Finland
Sweden

Group C
Team
**Georgia**
**Israel**
Switzerland
Bulgaria

Group D
Team
**France**
**Malta**
Ukraine
Portugal

== Referees ==
Thirteen referees were selected to officiate at the Qualifiers.

Group A
Referees
Georgia	Levan Berishvili
Israel	Tal Shildan
North Macedonia	Risto Damchevski
Sweden	Fredrik Månsson
Switzerland	Ruben Garcia

Group B
Referees
Czechia	Karel Dvořáček
France	Aurely Blanchard
Malta	Massimo Angileri
Portugal	Eurico Silva
Ukraine	George Makharadze

Group C
Referees
Finland	Jarkko Virtanen
Germany	Ralf Müller
Slovakia	Peter Radič
Turkey	Akif Uz

Group D
Referees
United Kingdom	Maxim Gerasimov
Netherlands	Rik Evers
Poland	Lukasz Król
Slovenia	Tomaž Kavčič

== Summary ==
Group winners and runners-up qualified directly for 2026 Men's European Water Polo Championship
Other teams were eliminated

Group A	Group B	Group C	Group D
Netherlands Slovenia	Slovakia Turkey	Georgia Israel	France Malta
Great Britain	Germany	Bulgaria	Ukraine
Poland	Sweden	Switzerland	Portugal
Czechia	Finland		

== Groups ==
All times are local.

=== Group A ===
- 8–11 June, Kranj, Slovenia.

Pos	Team	Pld	W	PSW	PSL	L	GF	GA	GD	Pts	Qualification
1	Netherlands	4	4	0	0	0	110	19	+91	12	Final tournament
2	Slovenia (H)	4	3	0	0	1	57	44	+13	9	Final tournament
3	Great Britain	4	2	0	0	2	33	57	−24	6	
4	Poland	4	1	0	0	3	40	63	−23	3	
5	Czechia	4	0	0	0	4	27	84	−57	0	

Source: European Aquatics
Rules for classification: 1) points; 2) head-to-head points; 3) head-to-head goal difference; 4) head-to-head number of goals scored; 5) Goal difference.
(H) Host

8 June 2025; 17:00	Report	Great Britain	3–27	Netherlands	Aquatic Centre, Kranj; Referees: Risto Damchevski (MKD), Fredrik Månsson (SWE)
8 June 2025; 17:00	Report	Score by quarters: 0–6, 0–4, 1–8, 2–9			Aquatic Centre, Kranj; Referees: Risto Damchevski (MKD), Fredrik Månsson (SWE)
8 June 2025; 17:00	Report	three players 1	Goals	S. Hessels, Te Riele 4	Aquatic Centre, Kranj; Referees: Risto Damchevski (MKD), Fredrik Månsson (SWE)

8 June 2025; 19:00	Report	Slovenia	19–8	Czechia	Aquatic Centre, Kranj; Referees: Tal Shildan (ISR), Ruben Garcia (SUI)
8 June 2025; 19:00	Report	Score by quarters: 6–0, 5–1, 3–4, 5–3			Aquatic Centre, Kranj; Referees: Tal Shildan (ISR), Ruben Garcia (SUI)
8 June 2025; 19:00	Report	Troppan 5	Goals	Bohutínský, Dittmer 3	Aquatic Centre, Kranj; Referees: Tal Shildan (ISR), Ruben Garcia (SUI)

9 June 2025; 17:00	Report	Great Britain	13–5	Czechia	Aquatic Centre, Kranj; Referees: Fredrik Månsson (SWE), Tal Shildan (ISR)
9 June 2025; 17:00	Report	Score by quarters: 3–3, 5–2, 1–0, 4–0			Aquatic Centre, Kranj; Referees: Fredrik Månsson (SWE), Tal Shildan (ISR)
9 June 2025; 17:00	Report	Blenkinship 4	Goals	Rameš 3	Aquatic Centre, Kranj; Referees: Fredrik Månsson (SWE), Tal Shildan (ISR)

9 June 2025; 19:00	Report	Slovenia	13–11	Poland	Aquatic Centre, Kranj; Referees: Levan Berishvili (GEO), Ruben Garcia (SUI)
9 June 2025; 19:00	Report	Score by quarters: 4–2, 1–4, 4–1, 4–4			Aquatic Centre, Kranj; Referees: Levan Berishvili (GEO), Ruben Garcia (SUI)
9 June 2025; 19:00	Report	Troppan 4	Goals	Kowalewski 4	Aquatic Centre, Kranj; Referees: Levan Berishvili (GEO), Ruben Garcia (SUI)

10 June 2025; 10:00	Report	Great Britain	11–9	Poland	Aquatic Centre, Kranj; Referees: Ruben Garcia (SUI), Risto Damchevski (MKD)
10 June 2025; 10:00	Report	Score by quarters: 1–4, 4–3, 3–1, 3–1			Aquatic Centre, Kranj; Referees: Ruben Garcia (SUI), Risto Damchevski (MKD)
10 June 2025; 10:00	Report	Blenkinship 4	Goals	Ozga 3	Aquatic Centre, Kranj; Referees: Ruben Garcia (SUI), Risto Damchevski (MKD)

10 June 2025; 12:00	Report	Netherlands	35–4	Czechia	Aquatic Centre, Kranj; Referees: Fredrik Månsson (SWE), Levan Berishvili (GEO)
10 June 2025; 12:00	Report	Score by quarters: 10–1, 6–1, 9–0, 10–2			Aquatic Centre, Kranj; Referees: Fredrik Månsson (SWE), Levan Berishvili (GEO)
10 June 2025; 12:00	Report	Van der Weijden 6	Goals	Pechman 2	Aquatic Centre, Kranj; Referees: Fredrik Månsson (SWE), Levan Berishvili (GEO)

10 June 2025; 18:00	Report	Slovenia	16–6	Great Britain	Aquatic Centre, Kranj; Referees: Levan Berishvili (GEO), Risto Damchevski (MKD)
10 June 2025; 18:00	Report	Score by quarters: 5–2, 3–0, 4–3, 4–1			Aquatic Centre, Kranj; Referees: Levan Berishvili (GEO), Risto Damchevski (MKD)
10 June 2025; 18:00	Report	Troppan 4	Goals	Hunt 3	Aquatic Centre, Kranj; Referees: Levan Berishvili (GEO), Risto Damchevski (MKD)

10 June 2025; 20:00	Report	Netherlands	29–3	Poland	Aquatic Centre, Kranj; Referees: Tal Shildan (ISR), Fredrik Månsson (SWE)
10 June 2025; 20:00	Report	Score by quarters: 5–0, 10–1, 7–1, 7–1			Aquatic Centre, Kranj; Referees: Tal Shildan (ISR), Fredrik Månsson (SWE)
10 June 2025; 20:00	Report	S. Hessels 6	Goals	Maciejewski 2	Aquatic Centre, Kranj; Referees: Tal Shildan (ISR), Fredrik Månsson (SWE)

11 June 2025; 17:00	Report	Czechia	10–17	Poland	Aquatic Centre, Kranj; Referees: Ruben Garcia (SUI), Levan Berishvili (GEO)
11 June 2025; 17:00	Report	Score by quarters: 2–4, 4–5, 1–3, 3–5			Aquatic Centre, Kranj; Referees: Ruben Garcia (SUI), Levan Berishvili (GEO)
11 June 2025; 17:00	Report	Rameš 3	Goals	Maciejewski 6	Aquatic Centre, Kranj; Referees: Ruben Garcia (SUI), Levan Berishvili (GEO)

11 June 2025; 19:00	Report	Slovenia	9–19	Netherlands	Aquatic Centre, Kranj; Referees: Tal Shildan (ISR), Risto Damchevski (MKD)
11 June 2025; 19:00	Report	Score by quarters: 0–4, 4–7, 2–4, 3–4			Aquatic Centre, Kranj; Referees: Tal Shildan (ISR), Risto Damchevski (MKD)
11 June 2025; 19:00	Report	Troppan 3	Goals	Ten Broek 5	Aquatic Centre, Kranj; Referees: Tal Shildan (ISR), Risto Damchevski (MKD)

=== Group B ===
- 8–11 June, Istanbul, Turkey.

Pos	Team	Pld	W	PSW	PSL	L	GF	GA	GD	Pts	Qualification
1	Slovakia	4	4	0	0	0	70	39	+31	12	Final tournament
2	Turkey (H)	4	3	0	0	1	92	42	+50	9	Final tournament
3	Germany	4	2	0	0	2	84	38	+46	6	
4	Sweden	4	1	0	0	3	37	94	−57	3	
5	Finland	4	0	0	0	4	32	102	−70	0	

Source: European Aquatics
Rules for classification: 1) points; 2) head-to-head points; 3) head-to-head goal difference; 4) head-to-head number of goals scored; 5) Goal difference.
(H) Host

8 June 2025; 18:30	Report	Finland	6–33	Turkey	Maltepe University, Istanbul; Referees: Karel Dvořáček (CZE), Massimo Angileri (MLT)
8 June 2025; 18:30	Report	Score by quarters: 0–8, 4–8, 1–7, 1–10			Maltepe University, Istanbul; Referees: Karel Dvořáček (CZE), Massimo Angileri (MLT)
8 June 2025; 18:30	Report	Johnsson, Strontsev 2	Goals	Alkan, Kuloğlu 7	Maltepe University, Istanbul; Referees: Karel Dvořáček (CZE), Massimo Angileri (MLT)

8 June 2025; 20:30	Report	Slovakia	21–11	Sweden	Maltepe University, Istanbul; Referees: Aurely Blanchard (FRA), George Makharadze (UKR)
8 June 2025; 20:30	Report	Score by quarters: 8–2, 4–3, 4–1, 5–5			Maltepe University, Istanbul; Referees: Aurely Blanchard (FRA), George Makharadze (UKR)
8 June 2025; 20:30	Report	Baláž 6	Goals	Zdolsek 5	Maltepe University, Istanbul; Referees: Aurely Blanchard (FRA), George Makharadze (UKR)

9 June 2025; 10:30	Report	Germany	8–13	Slovakia	Maltepe University, Istanbul; Referees: Eurico Silva (POR), Massimo Angileri (MLT)
9 June 2025; 10:30	Report	Score by quarters: 1–3, 1–4, 3–1, 3–5			Maltepe University, Istanbul; Referees: Eurico Silva (POR), Massimo Angileri (MLT)
9 June 2025; 10:30	Report	Küppers 3	Goals	Bielik 4	Maltepe University, Istanbul; Referees: Eurico Silva (POR), Massimo Angileri (MLT)

9 June 2025; 12:30	Report	Sweden	16–13	Finland	Maltepe University, Istanbul; Referees: Massimo Angileri (MLT), George Makharadze (UKR)
9 June 2025; 12:30	Report	Score by quarters: 4–4, 5–3, 4–2, 3–4			Maltepe University, Istanbul; Referees: Massimo Angileri (MLT), George Makharadze (UKR)
9 June 2025; 12:30	Report	Todorovic 3	Goals	Johnsson 4	Maltepe University, Istanbul; Referees: Massimo Angileri (MLT), George Makharadze (UKR)

9 June 2025; 18:30	Report	Turkey	12–13	Slovakia	Maltepe University, Istanbul; Referees: Karel Dvořáček (CZE), Aurely Blanchard (FRA)
9 June 2025; 18:30	Report	Score by quarters: 0–4, 3–2, 5–3, 4–4			Maltepe University, Istanbul; Referees: Karel Dvořáček (CZE), Aurely Blanchard (FRA)
9 June 2025; 18:30	Report	Naipoğlu 4	Goals	Furman, Tisaj 4	Maltepe University, Istanbul; Referees: Karel Dvořáček (CZE), Aurely Blanchard (FRA)

9 June 2025; 20:30	Report	Germany	30–3	Sweden	Maltepe University, Istanbul; Referees: Eurico Silva (POR), Massimo Angileri (MLT)
9 June 2025; 20:30	Report	Score by quarters: 9–1, 3–0, 9–0, 9–2			Maltepe University, Istanbul; Referees: Eurico Silva (POR), Massimo Angileri (MLT)
9 June 2025; 20:30	Report	Küppers 6	Goals	Kuchler 2	Maltepe University, Istanbul; Referees: Eurico Silva (POR), Massimo Angileri (MLT)

10 June 2025; 19:00	Report	Finland	5–30	Germany	Maltepe University, Istanbul; Referees: Karel Dvořáček (CZE), George Makharadze (UKR)
10 June 2025; 19:00	Report	Score by quarters: 0–4, 1–10, 1–10, 3–6			Maltepe University, Istanbul; Referees: Karel Dvořáček (CZE), George Makharadze (UKR)
10 June 2025; 19:00	Report	Lönnqvist, Ollila 2	Goals	Bozic 7	Maltepe University, Istanbul; Referees: Karel Dvořáček (CZE), George Makharadze (UKR)

10 June 2025; 20:00	Report	Sweden	7–30	Turkey	Maltepe University, Istanbul; Referees: Aurely Blanchard (FRA), Eurico Silva (POR)
10 June 2025; 20:00	Report	Score by quarters: 2–7, 2–8, 3–6, 0–9			Maltepe University, Istanbul; Referees: Aurely Blanchard (FRA), Eurico Silva (POR)
10 June 2025; 20:00	Report	Kuchler, Zdolsek 2	Goals	Yutmaz 5	Maltepe University, Istanbul; Referees: Aurely Blanchard (FRA), Eurico Silva (POR)

11 June 2025; 10:30	Report	Slovakia	23–8	Finland	Maltepe University, Istanbul; Referees: Massimo Angileri (MLT), Karel Dvořáček (CZE)
11 June 2025; 10:30	Report	Score by quarters: 7–0, 6–3, 7–2, 3–3			Maltepe University, Istanbul; Referees: Massimo Angileri (MLT), Karel Dvořáček (CZE)
11 June 2025; 10:30	Report	Juhász 6	Goals	Ollila 4	Maltepe University, Istanbul; Referees: Massimo Angileri (MLT), Karel Dvořáček (CZE)

11 June 2025; 12:30	Report	Turkey	17–16	Germany	Maltepe University, Istanbul; Referees: Eurico Silva (POR), George Makharadze (UKR)
11 June 2025; 12:30	Report	Score by quarters: 5–4, 3–3, 3–5, 6–4			Maltepe University, Istanbul; Referees: Eurico Silva (POR), George Makharadze (UKR)
11 June 2025; 12:30	Report	Caner 5	Goals	Strelezkij 9	Maltepe University, Istanbul; Referees: Eurico Silva (POR), George Makharadze (UKR)

=== Group C ===
- 9–11 June, Tbilisi, Georgia.

Pos	Team	Pld	W	PSW	PSL	L	GF	GA	GD	Pts	Qualification
1	Georgia (H)	3	3	0	0	0	89	24	+65	9	Final tournament
2	Israel	3	2	0	0	1	48	41	+7	6	Final tournament
3	Bulgaria	3	1	0	0	2	33	70	−37	3	
4	Switzerland	3	0	0	0	3	31	66	−35	0	

Source: European Aquatics
Rules for classification: 1) points; 2) head-to-head points; 3) head-to-head goal difference; 4) head-to-head number of goals scored; 5) Goal difference.
(H) Host

9 June 2025; 15:00	Report	Switzerland	13–23	Israel	Olympic swimming complex, Tbilisi; Referees: Ralf Müller (GER), Jarkko Virtanen (FIN)
9 June 2025; 15:00	Report	Score by quarters: 4–6, 2–6, 2–3, 5–8			Olympic swimming complex, Tbilisi; Referees: Ralf Müller (GER), Jarkko Virtanen (FIN)
9 June 2025; 15:00	Report	Roscio 3	Goals	Buzaglo 4	Olympic swimming complex, Tbilisi; Referees: Ralf Müller (GER), Jarkko Virtanen (FIN)

9 June 2025; 17:00	Report	Georgia	41–10	Bulgaria	Olympic swimming complex, Tbilisi; Referees: Akif Uz (TUR), Peter Radič (SVK)
9 June 2025; 17:00	Report	Score by quarters: 10–3, 11–3, 10–2, 10–2			Olympic swimming complex, Tbilisi; Referees: Akif Uz (TUR), Peter Radič (SVK)
9 June 2025; 17:00	Report	Magrakvelidze 6	Goals	Ganchev, Venov 4	Olympic swimming complex, Tbilisi; Referees: Akif Uz (TUR), Peter Radič (SVK)

10 June 2025; 15:00	Report	Israel	16–9	Bulgaria	Olympic swimming complex, Tbilisi; Referees: Akif Uz (TUR), Jarkko Virtanen (FIN)
10 June 2025; 15:00	Report	Score by quarters: 3–1, 5–0, 4–5, 4–3			Olympic swimming complex, Tbilisi; Referees: Akif Uz (TUR), Jarkko Virtanen (FIN)
10 June 2025; 15:00	Report	Klarfeld 3	Goals	Ganchev 4	Olympic swimming complex, Tbilisi; Referees: Akif Uz (TUR), Jarkko Virtanen (FIN)

10 June 2025; 17:00	Report	Georgia	28–5	Switzerland	Olympic swimming complex, Tbilisi; Referees: Ralf Müller (GER), Peter Radič (SVK)
10 June 2025; 17:00	Report	Score by quarters: 7–1, 8–1, 9–1, 4–2			Olympic swimming complex, Tbilisi; Referees: Ralf Müller (GER), Peter Radič (SVK)
10 June 2025; 17:00	Report	Dadvani 5	Goals	Domonkos 4	Olympic swimming complex, Tbilisi; Referees: Ralf Müller (GER), Peter Radič (SVK)

11 June 2025; 13:00	Report	Bulgaria	14–13	Switzerland	Olympic swimming complex, Tbilisi; Referees: Ralf Müller (GER), Jarkko Virtanen (FIN)
11 June 2025; 13:00	Report	Score by quarters: 4–3, 4–3, 4–4, 2–3			Olympic swimming complex, Tbilisi; Referees: Ralf Müller (GER), Jarkko Virtanen (FIN)
11 June 2025; 13:00	Report	Venov 5	Goals	Herzog 3	Olympic swimming complex, Tbilisi; Referees: Ralf Müller (GER), Jarkko Virtanen (FIN)

11 June 2025; 17:00	Report	Georgia	19–9	Israel	Olympic swimming complex, Tbilisi; Referees: Peter Radič (SVK), Akif Uz (TUR)
11 June 2025; 17:00	Report	Score by quarters: 4–2, 4–2, 4–2, 7–3			Olympic swimming complex, Tbilisi; Referees: Peter Radič (SVK), Akif Uz (TUR)
11 June 2025; 17:00	Report	Dadvani 4	Goals	Arazi 3	Olympic swimming complex, Tbilisi; Referees: Peter Radič (SVK), Akif Uz (TUR)

=== Group D ===
- 9–11 June, Gzira, Malta.

Pos	Team	Pld	W	PSW	PSL	L	GF	GA	GD	Pts	Qualification
1	France	3	2	1	0	0	58	31	+27	8	Final tournament
2	Malta (H)	3	2	0	1	0	44	39	+5	7	Final tournament
3	Ukraine	3	1	0	0	2	35	50	−15	3	
4	Portugal	3	0	0	0	3	33	50	−17	0	

Source: European Aquatics
Rules for classification: 1) points; 2) head-to-head points; 3) head-to-head goal difference; 4) head-to-head number of goals scored; 5) Goal difference.
(H) Host

9 June 2025; 18:00	Report	France	19–7	Portugal	Tal-Qroqq Sports Complex, Gzira; Referees: Rik Evers (NED), Tomaž Kavčič (SLO)
9 June 2025; 18:00	Report	Score by quarters: 4–1, 3–2, 7–2, 5–2			Tal-Qroqq Sports Complex, Gzira; Referees: Rik Evers (NED), Tomaž Kavčič (SLO)
9 June 2025; 18:00	Report	Bouet 6	Goals	P. Sousa 3	Tal-Qroqq Sports Complex, Gzira; Referees: Rik Evers (NED), Tomaž Kavčič (SLO)

9 June 2025; 19:30	Report	Malta	13–11	Ukraine	Tal-Qroqq Sports Complex, Gzira; Referees: Maxim Gerasimov (GBR), Łukasz Król (POL)
9 June 2025; 19:30	Report	Score by quarters: 5–2, 2–3, 2–4, 4–2			Tal-Qroqq Sports Complex, Gzira; Referees: Maxim Gerasimov (GBR), Łukasz Król (POL)
9 June 2025; 19:30	Report	Camilleri 4	Goals	Ashanin 5	Tal-Qroqq Sports Complex, Gzira; Referees: Maxim Gerasimov (GBR), Łukasz Król (POL)

10 June 2025; 18:00	Report	Ukraine	10–24	France	Tal-Qroqq Sports Complex, Gzira; Referees: Rik Evers (NED), Lukasz Król (POL)
10 June 2025; 18:00	Report	Score by quarters: 3–7, 2–3, 3–5, 2–9			Tal-Qroqq Sports Complex, Gzira; Referees: Rik Evers (NED), Lukasz Król (POL)
10 June 2025; 18:00	Report	Labyk, Veklyuk 3	Goals	Bouet, Vernoux 4	Tal-Qroqq Sports Complex, Gzira; Referees: Rik Evers (NED), Lukasz Król (POL)

10 June 2025; 19:30	Report	Portugal	13–17	Malta	Tal-Qroqq Sports Complex, Gzira; Referees: Rik Evers (NED), Maxim Gerasimov (GBR)
10 June 2025; 19:30	Report	Score by quarters: 0–4, 3–6, 5–3, 5–4			Tal-Qroqq Sports Complex, Gzira; Referees: Rik Evers (NED), Maxim Gerasimov (GBR)
10 June 2025; 19:30	Report	P. Sousa 3	Goals	Camilleri 4	Tal-Qroqq Sports Complex, Gzira; Referees: Rik Evers (NED), Maxim Gerasimov (GBR)

11 June 2025; 18:00	Report	Ukraine	14–13	Portugal	Tal-Qroqq Sports Complex, Gzira; Referees: Maxim Gerasimov (GBR), Lukasz Król (POL)
11 June 2025; 18:00	Report	Score by quarters: 2–4, 3–4, 3–3, 6–2			Tal-Qroqq Sports Complex, Gzira; Referees: Maxim Gerasimov (GBR), Lukasz Król (POL)
11 June 2025; 18:00	Report	Ashanin 5	Goals	Ramos 5	Tal-Qroqq Sports Complex, Gzira; Referees: Maxim Gerasimov (GBR), Lukasz Król (POL)

11 June 2025; 19:30	Report	Malta	14–15 (PSO)	France	Tal-Qroqq Sports Complex, Gzira; Referees: Tomi Kavčič (SLO), Rik Evers (NED)
11 June 2025; 19:30	Report	Score by quarters: 2–1, 4–2, 2–3, 2–4 PSO: 4–5			Tal-Qroqq Sports Complex, Gzira; Referees: Tomi Kavčič (SLO), Rik Evers (NED)
11 June 2025; 19:30	Report	Camilleri 3	Goals	Bouet 3	Tal-Qroqq Sports Complex, Gzira; Referees: Tomi Kavčič (SLO), Rik Evers (NED)
