= 2026 Men's European Water Polo Championship final =

International water-polo match

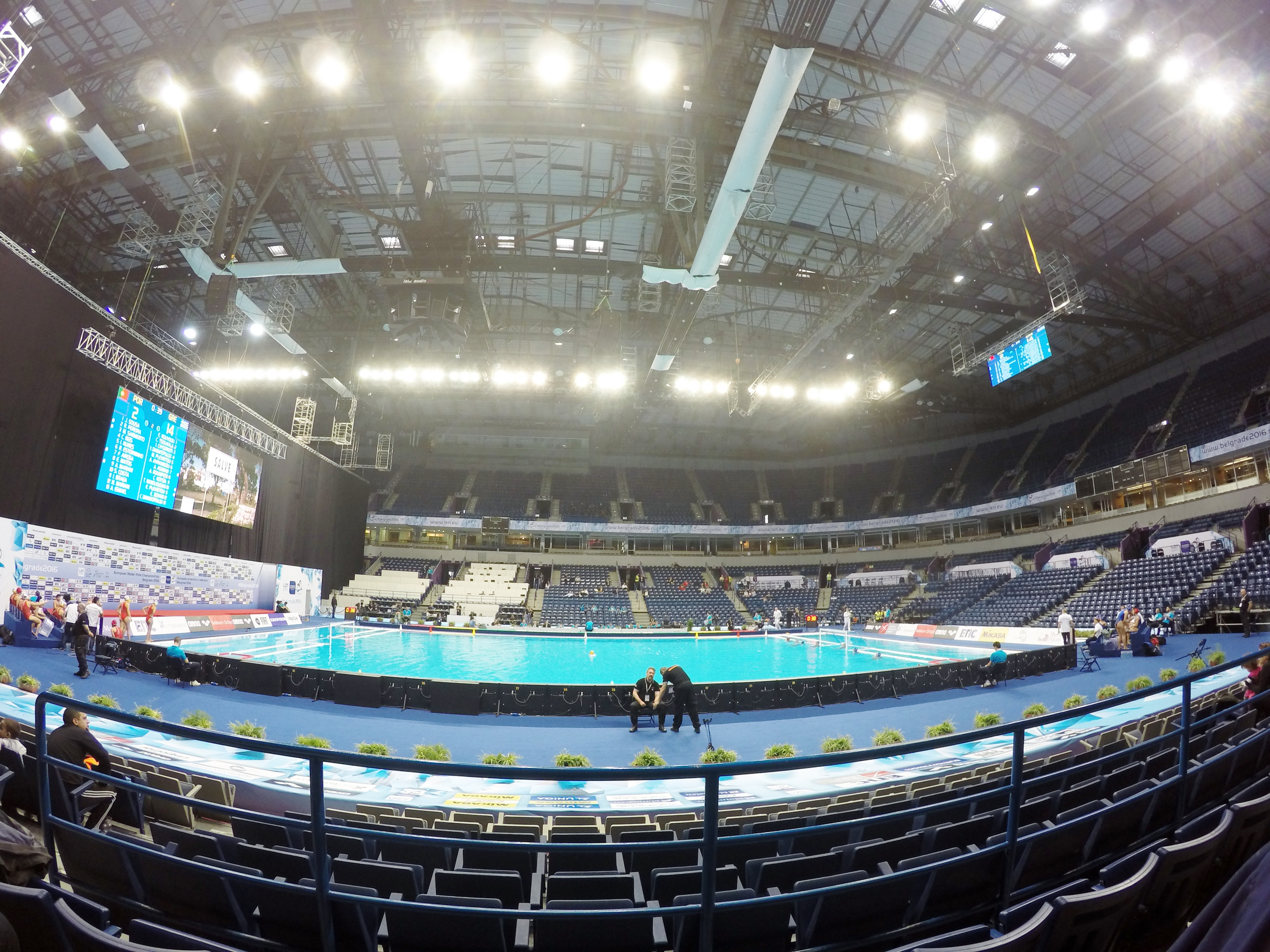
- The Belgrade Arena hosted the final.
- Event: 2026 Men's European Water Polo Championship
Serbia	Hungary
10	7
- Date: 25 January 2026
- Venue: Belgrade Arena, Belgrade
- Man of the Match: (Serbia) Dušan Mandić
- Referee: Frank Ohme (GER); Julien Bourges (FRA)

The 2026 Men's European Water Polo Championship final was the final match of the 2026 Men's European Water Polo Championship, the 37th edition of the biannual continental tournament in men's national water polo teams, organised by Europe's governing aquatics body, European Aquatics. The match was played at Belgrade Arena in Belgrade, Serbia, on 25 January 2026, and was contested by hosts Serbia and Hungary.

The tournament comprised hosts Serbia and 15 other teams. The 16 teams competed in a group stage, from which 12 teams qualified for the main round and 4 later advanced to the semifinals.

For Serbia, it is their seventh final (as Serbia) and it is the 21st final for the Hungarians. This is the third time they have met each other in a European Championship final after 2006 and 2014, with the Serbians winning both times. Both sides had already met each other earlier in the tournament, with the Serbs winning 15–14. Their last appearances for Serbia and Hungary in the final were in 2016 and 2022 respectively.

Serbia won their ninth title after beating the Hungarians 10–7 in the final.

== Background ==
The 2026 Men's European Water Polo Championship is the 37th edition of the biannual continental tournament in men's national water polo teams, organised by Europe's governing aquatics body, European Aquatics. The tournament takes place from 10 to 25 January 2026. This edition marks the 100 year anniversary of the championships. This edition is the first one ever to have a 25 meter swimming pool, down from 30 meters.

The competition was held in Serbia's capital, Belgrade, for the third time. This was the second edition to have different hosts for both genders after European Aquatics made the change permanent in March 2025. This edition will also witness a new format, introducing a second group stage.

== Route to the final ==
Note: In all results below, the score of the finalist is given first.

Serbia
Round
Hungary
Opponent
Result
Preliminary round
Opponent
Result
Netherlands
18–16 PSO
Match 1
France
15–7
Spain
12–11
Match 2
Montenegro
13–10
Israel
19–9
Match 3
Malta
21–6
Group C placement

Pos	Team	Pld	Pts
1	Serbia (H)	3	8
2	Spain	3	6
3	Netherlands	3	4
4	Israel	3	0

Source: EuropeanAquatics
(H) Host
Final standings
Group A placement

Pos	Team	Pld	Pts
1	Hungary	3	9
2	Montenegro	3	6
3	France	3	3
4	Malta	3	0

Source: EuropeanAquatics
Opponent
Result
Main round
Opponent
Result
France
14–10
Match 4
Netherlands
16–11
Hungary
15–14
Match 5
Serbia
14–15
Montenegro
13–15
Match 6
Spain
15–14 PSO
Group E placement

Pos	Team	Pld	Pts
1	Serbia (H)	5	11
2	Hungary	5	11
3	Spain	5	10
4	Montenegro	5	9
5	France	5	3
6	Netherlands	5	1

Source: EuropeanAquatics
(H) Host
Final standings
Group E placement

Pos	Team	Pld	Pts
1	Serbia (H)	5	11
2	Hungary	5	11
3	Spain	5	10
4	Montenegro	5	9
5	France	5	3
6	Netherlands	5	1

Source: EuropeanAquatics
(H) Host
Opponent
Result
Knockout stage
Opponent
Result
Italy
17–13
Semifinals
Greece
15–12

== Venue ==
The Belgrade Arena hosted the final. This will be the second time they host the final after 2016.

2026 Men's European Water Polo Championship final is located in Serbia	Belgrade
2026 Men's European Water Polo Championship final is located in Serbia	Belgrade Arena
2026 Men's European Water Polo Championship final is located in Serbia	Capacity: 18,386
2026 Men's European Water Polo Championship final is located in Serbia	Venue for the 2026 Men's European Water Polo Championships

== Match ==
25 January 2026; 20:30	Report	Serbia	10–7	Hungary	Belgrade Arena, Belgrade; Referees: Frank Ohme (GER), Julien Bourges (FRA)
25 January 2026; 20:30	Report	Score by quarters: 3–2, 2–3, 2–1, 3–1			Belgrade Arena, Belgrade; Referees: Frank Ohme (GER), Julien Bourges (FRA)
25 January 2026; 20:30	Report	Mandić 4	Goals	Vígvári 3	Belgrade Arena, Belgrade; Referees: Frank Ohme (GER), Julien Bourges (FRA)

Serbia
Pos	Num	Player	Goals	Min	Ast	Spr
W	2	Dušan Mandić	4/8	20:50	1	
W	3	Strahinja Rašović	0/2	10:13	1	
DF	4	Sava Ranđelović	0/1	7:23	0	
W	5	Miloš Ćuk	DNP			
CF	6	Đorđe Lazić	1/2	12:12	0	
W	7	Radomir Drašović	1/2	3:41	0	
W	8	Nikola Jakšić	0/2	27:21	1	
CF	9	Nemanja Vico	1/1	9:51	0	
W	10	Nikola Dedović	0/2	9:52	0	
DF	11	Petar Jakšić	0	6:42	0	
DF	12	Viktor Rašović	0/1	22:57	1	
W	14	Vasilije Martinović	1/4	29:56	1	1/4
W	15	Nikola Lukić	2/7	26:39	1	
Goalkeepers
Num	Player		Save		Min	Goals
1	Radoslav Filipović		DNP			
13	Milan Glušac		11/18 (61.1%)		32:00	0
Head coach
Uroš Stevanović

Serbia	Statistics	Hungary
10/32	Goals	7/34
6	Assists	5
1/4	Sprints	3/4

Timeouts
Team	Q1	Q2	Q3	Q4
Serbia	0	1	0	1
Hungary	0	0	1	1

Hungary
Pos	Num	Player	Goals	Min	Ast	Spr
DF	2	Dániel Angyal	DNP			
W	3	Krisztián Manhercz	0/6	23:09	0	
W	4	Nagy Ákos	1/4	11:12	0	
W	5	Vince Vigvári	0/1	19:16	3	
DF	6	Ádám Nagy	0/5	19:03	1	
W	7	Gergő Fekete	1/3	18:25	1	
W	8	Tátrai Dávid	0/2	12:36	0	
CF	9	Péter Kovács	0	13:02	0	
W	10	Vigvári Vendel	3/4	19:19	0	3/3
W	11	Szilárd Jansik	1/5	19:46	0	
CF	12	Benedek Batizi	DNP			
DF	14	Vismeg Zsombor	0/1	9:07	0	
W	15	Vince Varga	1/3	19:06	0	0/1
Goalkeepers
Num	Player		Save		Min	Goals
1	Csoma Kristóf		DNP			
13	Soma Vogel		6/16 (37.5%)		31:21	0
Head coach
Zsolt Varga

Assistant referees:
(Malta) Alexander de Raffaele
(Netherlands) Peter de Jong
Video assistant referee:
(Portugal) Eurico Silva
Timekeepers:
(Italy) Raffaele Colombo
(Romania) Mihai Balanescu
TWPC Delegates:
(Italy) Filippo Gomez
(Croatia) Milivoj Bebić

Match rules

- Four quarters of eight minutes (32 minutes in total).
- Penalty shoot-out if scores still level.

== Squads ==
Serbia
Name	Date of birth	Pos.	Club
Radoslav Filipović	19 August 1997 (aged 28)	GK	(Serbia) Radnički Kragujevac
Dušan Mandić	16 June 1994 (aged 31)	W	(Hungary) FTC-Telekom
Strahinja Rašović	9 March 1992 (aged 33)	W	(Serbia) Radnički Kragujevac
Sava Ranđelović	17 July 1993 (aged 32)	DF	(Serbia) Radnički Kragujevac
Miloš Ćuk	21 December 1990 (aged 35)	W	(Serbia) VK Novi Beograd
Đorđe Lazić	19 May 1996 (aged 29)	CF	(Montenegro) Jadran m:tel Herceg Novi
Radomir Drašović	22 July 1997 (aged 28)	W	(France) CN Marseille
Nikola Jakšić (C)	17 January 1997 (aged 28)	W	(Serbia) Radnički Kragujevac
Nemanja Vico	19 November 1994 (aged 31)	CF	(Montenegro) VK Primorac Kotor
Nikola Dedović	25 January 1992 (aged 33)	W	(Serbia) Radnički Kragujevac
Petar Jakšić	20 July 2001 (aged 24)	DF	(Serbia) Radnički Kragujevac
Viktor Rašović	13 August 1993 (aged 32)	DF	(Serbia) Radnički Kragujevac
Milan Glusac	30 September 2002 (aged 23)	GK	(Serbia) VK Novi Beograd
Vasilije Martinović	13 January 1993 (aged 32)	W	(Serbia) VK Novi Beograd
Nikola Lukić	14 April 1998 (aged 27)	W	(Serbia) VK Novi Beograd

Hungary
Name	Date of birth	Pos.	Club
Csoma Kristóf	26 January 1992 (aged 33)	GK	(Hungary) Budapesti Honvéd SE
Dániel Angyal	29 March 1992 (aged 33)	DF	(Greece) Olympiacos Piraeus
Krisztián Manhercz (C)	6 February 1997 (aged 28)	W	(Hungary) FTC-Telekom
Nagy Ákos	15 April 2004 (aged 21)	W	(Hungary) FTC-Telekom
Vince Vigvári	23 June 2003 (aged 22)	W	(Spain) CN Barcelona
Ádám Nagy	19 May 1998 (aged 27)	DF	(France) CN Marseille
Gergő Fekete	24 June 2000 (aged 25)	W	(Hungary) FTC-Telekom
Tátrai Dávid	15 August 2003 (aged 22)	W	(Hungary) BVSC Manna ABC
Péter Kovács	16 May 1991 (aged 34)	CF	(Hungary) BVSC Manna ABC
Vigvári Vendel	10 September 2001 (aged 24)	W	(Hungary) FTC-Telekom
Szilárd Jansik	6 April 1994 (aged 31)	W	(Hungary) FTC-Telekom
Benedek Batizi	21 August 2001 (aged 24)	CF	(Hungary) BVSC Manna ABC
Soma Vogel	7 July 1997 (aged 28)	GK	(Hungary) FTC-Telekom
Vismeg Zsombor	14 March 2003 (aged 22)	DF	(Hungary) FTC-Telekom
Vince Varga	16 August 2005 (aged 20)	W	(Hungary) FTC-Telekom
