= 2026 Men's European Water Polo Championship =

Water polo tournament held in Belgrade, Serbia

Европско првенство у ватерполу 2026 (in Serbian)
- Power that unites

Tournament details
- Country: Serbia
- City: Belgrade
- Venue: Belgrade Arena
- Dates: 10–25 January
- Teams: 16 (from 1 confederation)

Final positions
- Champions: Serbia (9th title)
- Runners-up: Hungary
- Third place: Greece
- Fourth place: Italy

Tournament statistics
- Matches played: 56
- Goals scored: 1,490 (26.61 per match)
- Top scorer: (France) Thomas Vernoux (Greece) Stylianos Argyropoulos (26 goals)
- Most saves: (France) Hugo Fontani (30 saves)

Official website
- Belgrade 2026

The 2026 Men's European Water Polo Championship was the 37th edition of the biannual continental tournament in men's national water polo teams, organised by Europe's governing aquatics body, European Aquatics. The tournament took place from 10 to 25 January 2026. This edition marked the 100 year anniversary of the championships. This edition was the first one ever to have a 25 meter swimming pool, down from 30 meters.

The competition was held in Serbia's capital, Belgrade, for the third time. This was the second edition to have different hosts for both genders after European Aquatics made the change permanent in March 2025. This edition also witnessed a new format, introducing a second group stage as opposed to an extended knockout round.

16 teams took part for the sixth time. The top eight teams, including hosts Serbia, from the 2024 version qualified automatically, while the remaining eights teams progressed via qualification. Turkey qualified after a 6-year drought, while Germany failed to qualify on merit for the first time.

This tournament acted as a qualifier for the 2027 World Aquatics Championships in Budapest and 2028 European Championship.

Spain was the defending champions, beating Croatia, 11–10, in the final in Zagreb. However, they failed to defend their title after missing out on the semifinals. Host Serbia won their ninth title after beating Hungary 10–7 in the final. Greece managed to be on the podium for the first time after beating Italy in the bronze medal game with an score of 12–5. Greece and Malta achieved their best placements, finishing 3rd and 13th respectively.

== Host selection ==
- (Serbia) Belgrade

Belgrade was given the hosting rights on 13 May 2022. This will be Serbia's third time hosting after 2006 and 2016. Serbia had originally been given the women's event as well, but decided not to host it in order to focus on the men's championship.

== Preparations ==
- A dedicated website was created on 25 August 2025.
- During the 14th Great Sports Fair of Serbia from 26 to 28 September 2025, at Ada Ciganlija, the slogan for the tournament was unveiled, being the phrase "Power that unites".
- On 11 December 2025, Uniqa was announced as a sponsor for the tournament.

=== Tickets ===
Tickets went on sale on 2 October 2025.

=== Partners and sponsors ===
- 5 Stepeni
- Asee
- AdmiralBet
- Alta Banka
- Delfina
- Epam
- Fluidra
- Kap Seven
- Malmsten
- Metalfer Group
- Nike
- Uniqa

== Format ==
A new system will be used for this tournament. The new format was unveiled in March 2025. This is the third different format in three editions. Despite some slight changes, the format is very adjacent to the format previously used for the European Handball Championship when the tournament still had 16 teams (the format has been discontinued due to the European Handball Championship expanding to 24 teams). Head coach of Croatia, Ivica Tucak, supports the format change, saying it gives teams a second chance to come back if they stumble earlier in the tournament.

- Group stage

In each group there will be two teams from the last tournament and two teams from the qualifiers. They will play a round-robin in their groups. The top three teams of each group will advance to the main round (Group A & Group C in Group E and Group B & Group D in Group F) with all results are carried over. The four-bottom ranked-teams will play in placement games.

- Main round

The advancing teams will play the opponents from the other group in the main round. From the main round, the top-two ranked teams of each group advance to the semifinals, all other teams will play in placement games.

- Knockout stage

In the knockout stage, the four remaining teams progress to the knockout stage. Two semifinals and a final will determine who wins the championship.

== Qualification ==
Map of qualifiers for the 2026 Men's European Water Polo Championship: Team qualified for 2026 Men's European Water Polo Championship Team failed to qualify Team banned from competition Did not enter

For the sixth time, sixteen teams will take part after the expansion in 2016. Overall, 18 teams took part in qualification. Qualification took place in 8–11 June 2025. Qualification is broken up as follows:

- The host nation
- The top seven teams from the 2024 European Championship not already qualified as host nation
- Final eight from the qualifiers.

Regarding the teams, there is one change to the line-up, with Turkey returning after a six year drought. The Turks replaced two-time champions, Germany, who missed out for the first time since 1962 and failed to qualify for the first time ever. Slovenia qualified for the third consecutive time for the first time.

The lowest ranked team to qualify was Israel, ranked 17th, while Germany is the highest ranked team to not qualify, placed 10th.

Event	Date	Location	Quotas	Nation(s)
Host	13 May 2022		1	Serbia
2024 European Championship	4–16 January	Croatia	7	Spain; Croatia; Italy; Hungary; Greece; Montenegro; Romania
Qualifiers	8–11 June 2025	(Slovenia) Kranj	2	Netherlands; Slovenia
Qualifiers	8–11 June 2025	(Turkey) Istanbul	2	Slovakia; Turkey
Qualifiers	8–11 June 2025	(Georgia (country)) Tbilisi	2	Georgia; Israel
Qualifiers	8–11 June 2025	(Malta) Gzira	2	France; Malta

=== Summary of qualified teams ===
Team	Qualification method	Date of qualification	Appearance(s)				Previous best performance (Note: bold text indicates they hosted that edition.)	Rank
Team	Qualification method	Date of qualification	Total	First	Last	Streak	Previous best performance	Rank
Serbia	Host nation	13 May 2022	31th	1927^{a}	2024	16	Champions (Eight times) (Note: Serbia and Montenegro and Serbia have won in 1991, 2001, 2003, 2006, 2012, 2014, 2016 and 2018)	7
Croatia	Top eight in 2024	8 January 2024	17th	1993	2024	17	Champions (2010, 2022)	2
Hungary	Top eight in 2024	8 January 2024	36th	1926	2024	30	Champions (Thirteen times) (Note: Hungary have won in 1926, 1927, 1931, 1934, 1938, 1954, 1958, 1962, 1974, 1977, 1997, 1999 and 2020.)	3
Italy	Top eight in 2024	8 January 2024	35th	1927	2024	34	Champions (1947, 1993, 1995)	4
Spain	Top eight in 2024	8 January 2024	31st	1927	2024	27	Champions (2024)	1
Montenegro	Top eight in 2024	10 January 2024	10th	2008	2024	10	Champions (2008)	5
Greece	Top eight in 2024	11 January 2024	21st	1970	2024	19	Fourth place (1999, 2016)	6
Romania	Top eight in 2024	11 January 2024	27th	1954	2024	14	Fourth place (1993, 2006)	9
Slovakia	Top two in Group B	9 June 2025	12th	1993	2024	6	Seventh place (2003)	15
Georgia	Top two in Group C	10 June 2025	6th	2016	2024	6	Eighth place (2022)	12
Israel	Top two in Group C	10 June 2025	3rd	2022	2024	3	Twelfth place (2022)	17
Netherlands	Top two in Group A	10 June 2025	31st	1927	2024	6	Champions (1950)	11
Slovenia	Top two in Group A	10 June 2025	6th	1999	2024	3	Eleventh place (1999)	16
France	Top two in Group D	10 June 2025	20th	1927	2024	7	Runners-up (1927)	8
Malta	Top two in Group D	10 June 2025	6th	2016	2024	6	Fourteenth place (2022)	13
Turkey	Top two in Group B	11 June 2025	8th	2016	2020	1	Twelfth place (2020)	14

^{a} Competed as SFR Yugoslavia from 1956 to 1970 and as Serbia and Montenegro from 1998 to 2006, 11 appearances as Serbia since 2006.

== Venue ==
Similar to 2016, the Belgrade Arena will be used for the entire competition. Built in 2004, it is the biggest indoor arena in Serbia with a capacity of 18,386. Due to the pool having to be raised, the capacity was reduced to 12,500.

2026 Men's European Water Polo Championship is located in Serbia	Belgrade
2026 Men's European Water Polo Championship is located in Serbia	Belgrade Arena
2026 Men's European Water Polo Championship is located in Serbia	Capacity: 12,500
2026 Men's European Water Polo Championship is located in Serbia	Venue for the 2026 Men's European Water Polo Championships

== Draw ==
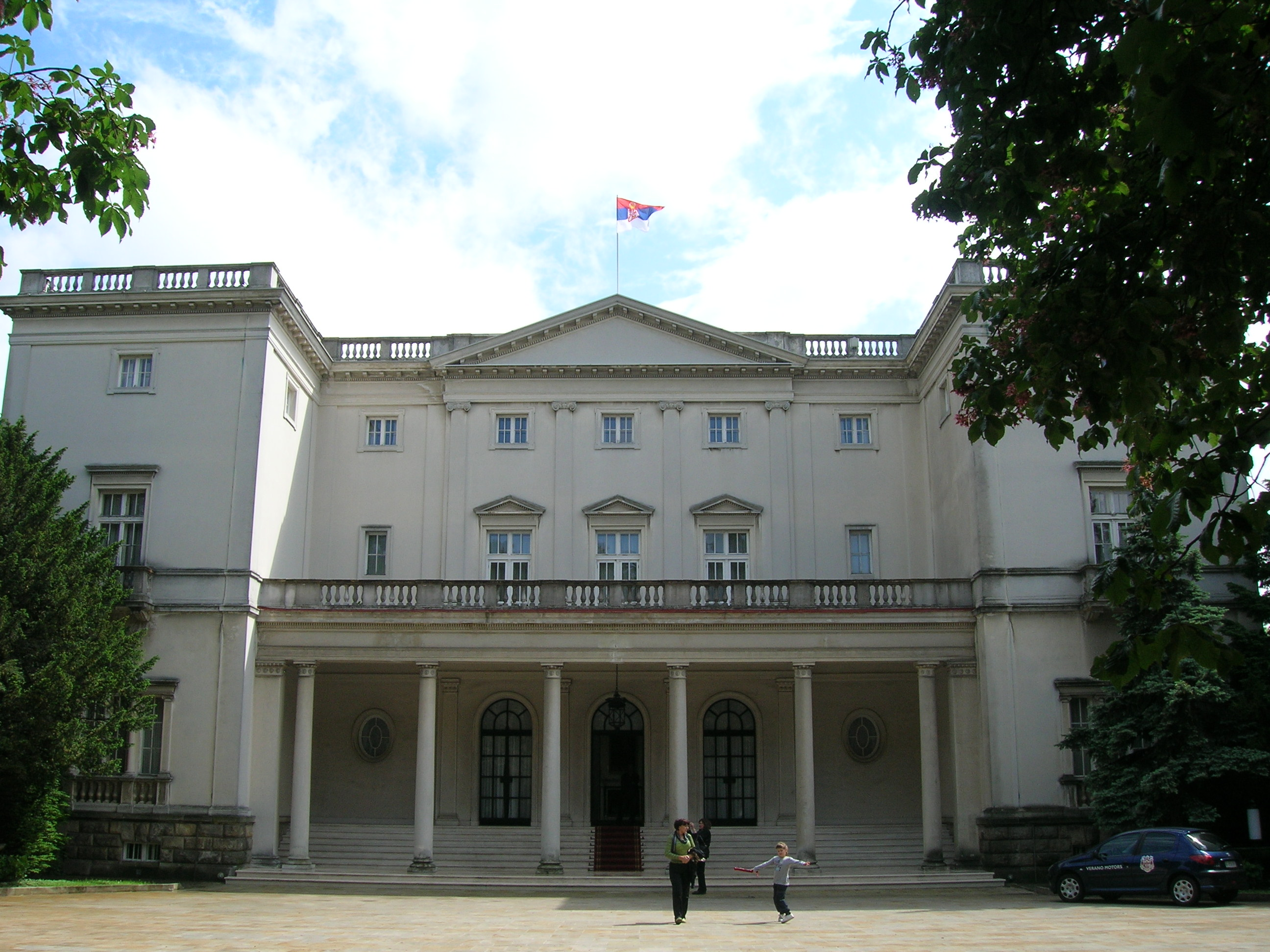
The Beli dvor in Belgrade hosted the draw.

The draw was held at 19:00 CET on 13 September 2025 at the Beli dvor in Belgrade, Serbia. Serbian journalist, Marija Kilibarda, was the host for the draw. Before the draw began, speeches were done by Serbian water polo federation president and local organising committee chair, Viktor Jelenić, and European Aquatics president, Antonio Silva. The guests were Serbian Olympic water polo players, Filip Filipović and Milan Aleksić, who assisted with the draw. The draw started with, in order, pots 1, 2, 3 and 4 being drawn, with each team selected then allocated into the first available group alphabetically. The position for the team within the group would then be drawn (for the purpose of the schedule).

=== Seeding ===
The pots were decided by the rankings of the 2024 European Championship and also of the 2026 Qualifiers.

- Pot 1 consisted of the teams positioned 1–4 in the 2024 Men's European Water Polo Championship
- Pot 2 consisted of the teams positioned 5–8 in the 2024 Men's European Water Polo Championship
- Pot 3 consisted of the group winners of the 2026 Men's European Water Polo Championship Qualifiers
- Pot 4 consisted of the group runners-up of the 2026 Men's European Water Polo Championship Qualifiers

Pot 1
Team	Rank
Spain	1
Croatia	2
Italy	3
Hungary	4

Pot 2
Team	Rank
Greece	5
Montenegro	6
Serbia (H)	7
Romania	8

Pot 3
Team	Group
Netherlands	A
Slovakia	B
Georgia	C
France	D

Pot 4
Team	Group
Slovenia	A
Turkey	B
Israel	C
Malta	D

- 2026 Men's European Water Polo Championship – Draw
- Draw Live Streaming

=== Draw results ===
Group A
Pos	Team
A1	Malta
A2	France
A3	Montenegro
A4	Hungary

Group B
Pos	Team
B1	Slovenia
B2	Greece
B3	Croatia
B4	Georgia

Group C
Pos	Team
C1	Netherlands
C2	Israel
C3	Serbia (H)
C4	Spain

Group D
Pos	Team
D1	Turkey
D2	Romania
D3	Italy
D4	Slovakia

=== Schedule ===
Schedule
Round	Matchday	Date
Group stage	Matchday 1	10–11 January 2026
Group stage	Matchday 2	12–13 January 2026
Group stage	Matchday 3	14–15 January 2026
Classification round	Matchday 1	16 January 2026
Classification round	Matchday 2	17 January 2026
Classification round	Matchday 3	18 January 2026
Main round	Matchday 4	16–17 January 2026
Main round	Matchday 5	18–19 January 2026
Main round	Matchday 6	20–21 January 2026
5–12 placement games	All games	22 January 2026
Knockout stage	Semi-finals	23 January 2026
Knockout stage	Final	25 January 2026

== Referees ==
On 24 November, the following 18 referees were selected for the tournament. The referees represent 18 countries, including the 16 participating teams alongside match officials from Germany and Portugal.

- (Croatia) Andrej Franulović
- (France) Julien Bourges
- (Germany) Frank Ohme
- (Georgia (country)) Levan Berishvili
- (Greece) Georgios Stavridis
- (Hungary) Tamás Kovács-Csatlós
- (Israel) Matan Schwartz
- (Italy) Raffaele Colombo
- (Malta) Alex De Raffaele
- (Montenegro) Veselin Mišković
- (Netherlands) Peter de Jong
- (Portugal) Eurico Silva
- (Romania) Mihai Balanescu
- (Serbia) Ivan Raković
- (Slovakia) Peter Radič
- (Slovenia) Boris Margeta
- (Spain) David Gómez
- (Turkey) Erkan Turkkan

== Squads ==
Each nation has to submit a list of 15 players.

== Preliminary round ==
Map of final standings for the 2026 Men's European Water Polo Championship: Winner Runner-up / Third place Fourth place / Main round Classification round

=== Tiebreakers ===
Teams are ranked according to points (3 points for a win, 2 points for a penalty shootout win, 1 point for a penalty shootout loss, 0 points for a loss), and if tied on points, the following tiebreaking criteria are applied, in the order given, to determine the rankings:

1. Points in head-to-head matches among tied teams;
2. Goal difference in head-to-head matches among tied teams;
3. Goals scored in head-to-head matches among tied teams;
4. Goal difference in all group matches;
5. Goals scored in all group matches.

If the ranking of one of these teams is determined, the above criteria are consecutively followed until the ranking of all teams is determined. If no ranking can be determined, a drawing of lots will decide the outcome.

All times are local (UTC+1).

=== Group A ===
Pos	Team	Pld	W	PSW	PSL	L	GF	GA	GD	Pts	Qualification
1	Hungary	3	3	0	0	0	49	23	+26	9	Main round
2	Montenegro	3	2	0	0	1	44	37	+7	6	Main round
3	France	3	1	0	0	2	41	41	0	3	Main round
4	Malta	3	0	0	0	3	31	64	−33	0	Classification round

Source: EuropeanAquatics
Rules for classification: 1) points; 2) head-to-head points; 3) head-to-head goal difference; 4) head-to-head number of goals scored; 5) Goal difference.

10 January 2026; 15:15	Report	France	7–15	Hungary	Belgrade Arena, Belgrade; Referees: Boris Margeta (SLO), Andrej Franulović (CRO)
10 January 2026; 15:15	Report	Score by quarters: 1–4, 4–6, 0–2, 2–3			Belgrade Arena, Belgrade; Referees: Boris Margeta (SLO), Andrej Franulović (CRO)
10 January 2026; 15:15	Report	Vernoux 5	Goals	Manhercz 4	Belgrade Arena, Belgrade; Referees: Boris Margeta (SLO), Andrej Franulović (CRO)

10 January 2026; 18:00	Report	Malta	12–21	Montenegro	Belgrade Arena, Belgrade; Referees: Georgios Stavridis (GRE), Eurico Silva (POR)
10 January 2026; 18:00	Report	Score by quarters: 5–6, 0–5, 4–5, 3–5			Belgrade Arena, Belgrade; Referees: Georgios Stavridis (GRE), Eurico Silva (POR)
10 January 2026; 18:00	Report	Camilleri 4	Goals	Gojković 4	Belgrade Arena, Belgrade; Referees: Georgios Stavridis (GRE), Eurico Silva (POR)

12 January 2026; 12:45	Report	Malta	13–22	France	Belgrade Arena, Belgrade; Referees: Frank Ohme (GER), Erkan Turkkan (TUR)
12 January 2026; 12:45	Report	Score by quarters: 4–6, 2–5, 3–6, 4–5			Belgrade Arena, Belgrade; Referees: Frank Ohme (GER), Erkan Turkkan (TUR)
12 January 2026; 12:45	Report	Camilleri 3	Goals	Vernoux 5	Belgrade Arena, Belgrade; Referees: Frank Ohme (GER), Erkan Turkkan (TUR)

12 January 2026; 15:15	Report	Hungary	13–10	Montenegro	Belgrade Arena, Belgrade; Referees: Raffaele Colombo (ITA), Matan Schwartz (ISR)
12 January 2026; 15:15	Report	Score by quarters: 4–3, 4–1, 3–1, 2–5			Belgrade Arena, Belgrade; Referees: Raffaele Colombo (ITA), Matan Schwartz (ISR)
12 January 2026; 15:15	Report	Angyal 3	Goals	Matković 3	Belgrade Arena, Belgrade; Referees: Raffaele Colombo (ITA), Matan Schwartz (ISR)

14 January 2026; 12:30	Report	Malta	6–21	Hungary	Belgrade Arena, Belgrade; Referees: Levan Berishvili (GEO), Erkan Turkkan (TUR)
14 January 2026; 12:30	Report	Score by quarters: 2–4, 2–7, 2–5, 0–5			Belgrade Arena, Belgrade; Referees: Levan Berishvili (GEO), Erkan Turkkan (TUR)
14 January 2026; 12:30	Report	Galea 2	Goals	four players 3	Belgrade Arena, Belgrade; Referees: Levan Berishvili (GEO), Erkan Turkkan (TUR)

14 January 2026; 18:00	Report	France	12–13	Montenegro	Belgrade Arena, Belgrade; Referees: Georgios Stavridis (GRE), Mihai Balanescu (ROU)
14 January 2026; 18:00	Report	Score by quarters: 3–3, 3–7, 2–2, 4–1			Belgrade Arena, Belgrade; Referees: Georgios Stavridis (GRE), Mihai Balanescu (ROU)
14 January 2026; 18:00	Report	Canovas 5	Goals	Vučković 5	Belgrade Arena, Belgrade; Referees: Georgios Stavridis (GRE), Mihai Balanescu (ROU)

=== Group B ===
Pos	Team	Pld	W	PSW	PSL	L	GF	GA	GD	Pts	Qualification
1	Greece	3	3	0	0	0	54	24	+30	9	Main round
2	Croatia	3	2	0	0	1	48	22	+26	6	Main round
3	Georgia	3	1	0	0	2	35	49	−14	3	Main round
4	Slovenia	3	0	0	0	3	23	65	−42	0	Classification round

Source: EuropeanAquatics
Rules for classification: 1) points; 2) head-to-head points; 3) head-to-head goal difference; 4) head-to-head number of goals scored; 5) Goal difference.

11 January 2026; 18:00	Report	Slovenia	4–20	Croatia	Belgrade Arena, Belgrade; Referees: David Gómez (ESP), Alex De Raffaele (MLT)
11 January 2026; 18:00	Report	Score by quarters: 1–3, 1–5, 1–7, 1–5			Belgrade Arena, Belgrade; Referees: David Gómez (ESP), Alex De Raffaele (MLT)
11 January 2026; 18:00	Report	four players 1	Goals	Butić 4	Belgrade Arena, Belgrade; Referees: David Gómez (ESP), Alex De Raffaele (MLT)

11 January 2026; 20:30	Report	Greece	20–6	Georgia	Belgrade Arena, Belgrade; Referees: Matan Schwartz (ISR), Veselin Mišković (MNE)
11 January 2026; 20:30	Report	Score by quarters: 3–0, 9–2, 3–2, 5–2			Belgrade Arena, Belgrade; Referees: Matan Schwartz (ISR), Veselin Mišković (MNE)
11 January 2026; 20:30	Report	Kakaris 4	Goals	Vasić 2	Belgrade Arena, Belgrade; Referees: Matan Schwartz (ISR), Veselin Mišković (MNE)

13 January 2026; 12:45	Report	Georgia	7–18	Croatia	Belgrade Arena, Belgrade; Referees: Julien Bourges (FRA), Peter de Jong (NED)
13 January 2026; 12:45	Report	Score by quarters: 2–3, 0–4, 2–5, 3–6			Belgrade Arena, Belgrade; Referees: Julien Bourges (FRA), Peter de Jong (NED)
13 January 2026; 12:45	Report	Bitadze, Shushiashvili 2	Goals	Kharkov 4	Belgrade Arena, Belgrade; Referees: Julien Bourges (FRA), Peter de Jong (NED)

13 January 2026; 15:15	Report	Slovenia	8–23	Greece	Belgrade Arena, Belgrade; Referees: Veselin Mišković (MNE), Alex De Raffaele (MLT)
13 January 2026; 15:15	Report	Score by quarters: 2–7, 1–5, 2–7, 3–4			Belgrade Arena, Belgrade; Referees: Veselin Mišković (MNE), Alex De Raffaele (MLT)
13 January 2026; 15:15	Report	Potočnik 2	Goals	Argyropoulos, Nikolaidis 4	Belgrade Arena, Belgrade; Referees: Veselin Mišković (MNE), Alex De Raffaele (MLT)

15 January 2026; 18:00	Report	Slovenia	11–22	Georgia	Belgrade Arena, Belgrade; Referees: David Gómez (ESP), Eurico Silva (POR)
15 January 2026; 18:00	Report	Score by quarters: 3–4, 5–4, 2–6, 1–8			Belgrade Arena, Belgrade; Referees: David Gómez (ESP), Eurico Silva (POR)
15 January 2026; 18:00	Report	Troppan 5	Goals	three players 3	Belgrade Arena, Belgrade; Referees: David Gómez (ESP), Eurico Silva (POR)

15 January 2026; 20:30	Report	Greece	11–10	Croatia	Belgrade Arena, Belgrade; Referees: Tamás Kovács-Csatlós (HUN), Matan Schwartz (ISR)
15 January 2026; 20:30	Report	Score by quarters: 3–2, 2–1, 3–4, 3–3			Belgrade Arena, Belgrade; Referees: Tamás Kovács-Csatlós (HUN), Matan Schwartz (ISR)
15 January 2026; 20:30	Report	Argyropoulos 4	Goals	Fatović 3	Belgrade Arena, Belgrade; Referees: Tamás Kovács-Csatlós (HUN), Matan Schwartz (ISR)

=== Group C ===
Pos	Team	Pld	W	PSW	PSL	L	GF	GA	GD	Pts	Qualification
1	Serbia (H)	3	2	1	0	0	44	33	+11	8	Main round
2	Spain	3	2	0	0	1	53	22	+31	6	Main round
3	Netherlands	3	1	0	1	1	39	38	+1	4	Main round
4	Israel	3	0	0	0	3	23	66	−43	0	Classification round

Source: EuropeanAquatics
Rules for classification: 1) points; 2) head-to-head points; 3) head-to-head goal difference; 4) head-to-head number of goals scored; 5) Goal difference.
(H) Host

10 January 2026; 12:45	Report	Israel	3–28	Spain	Belgrade Arena, Belgrade; Referees: Raffaele Colombo (ITA), Mihai Balanescu (ROU)
10 January 2026; 12:45	Report	Score by quarters: 0–9, 3–6, 0–6, 0–7			Belgrade Arena, Belgrade; Referees: Raffaele Colombo (ITA), Mihai Balanescu (ROU)
10 January 2026; 12:45	Report	three players 1	Goals	Granados 6	Belgrade Arena, Belgrade; Referees: Raffaele Colombo (ITA), Mihai Balanescu (ROU)

10 January 2026; 20:30	Report	Netherlands	13–13; PSO: 3–5	Serbia	Belgrade Arena, Belgrade; Referees: Frank Ohme (GER), Levan Berishvili (GEO)
10 January 2026; 20:30	Report	Score by quarters: 5–4, 3–2, 2–3, 3–4			Belgrade Arena, Belgrade; Referees: Frank Ohme (GER), Levan Berishvili (GEO)
10 January 2026; 20:30	Report	Te Riele 5	Goals	Mandić 6	Belgrade Arena, Belgrade; Referees: Frank Ohme (GER), Levan Berishvili (GEO)

12 January 2026; 18:00	Report	Netherlands	19–11	Israel	Belgrade Arena, Belgrade; Referees: Andrej Franulović (CRO), Peter Radič (SVK)
12 January 2026; 18:00	Report	Score by quarters: 4–3, 5–0, 5–5, 5–3			Belgrade Arena, Belgrade; Referees: Andrej Franulović (CRO), Peter Radič (SVK)
12 January 2026; 18:00	Report	Van der Weijden 4	Goals	Goldschmidt, Schlein 3	Belgrade Arena, Belgrade; Referees: Andrej Franulović (CRO), Peter Radič (SVK)

12 January 2026; 20:30	Report	Spain	11–12	Serbia	Belgrade Arena, Belgrade; Referees: Boris Margeta (SLO), Georgios Stavridis (GRE)
12 January 2026; 20:30	Report	Score by quarters: 3–3, 2–3, 2–3, 4–3			Belgrade Arena, Belgrade; Referees: Boris Margeta (SLO), Georgios Stavridis (GRE)
12 January 2026; 20:30	Report	Munarriz 4	Goals	Rašović 4	Belgrade Arena, Belgrade; Referees: Boris Margeta (SLO), Georgios Stavridis (GRE)

14 January 2026; 15:15	Report	Netherlands	7–14	Spain	Belgrade Arena, Belgrade; Referees: Frank Ohme (GER), Andrej Franulović (CRO)
14 January 2026; 15:15	Report	Score by quarters: 2–3, 2–4, 2–5, 1–2			Belgrade Arena, Belgrade; Referees: Frank Ohme (GER), Andrej Franulović (CRO)
14 January 2026; 15:15	Report	Te Riele 4	Goals	Munarriz 4	Belgrade Arena, Belgrade; Referees: Frank Ohme (GER), Andrej Franulović (CRO)

14 January 2026; 20:30	Report	Israel	9–19	Serbia	Belgrade Arena, Belgrade; Referees: Raffaele Colombo (ITA), Peter Radič (SVK)
14 January 2026; 20:30	Report	Score by quarters: 3–4, 3–5, 1–3, 2–7			Belgrade Arena, Belgrade; Referees: Raffaele Colombo (ITA), Peter Radič (SVK)
14 January 2026; 20:30	Report	three players 2	Goals	Rašović 4	Belgrade Arena, Belgrade; Referees: Raffaele Colombo (ITA), Peter Radič (SVK)

=== Group D ===
Pos	Team	Pld	W	PSW	PSL	L	GF	GA	GD	Pts	Qualification
1	Italy	3	3	0	0	0	56	26	+30	9	Main round
2	Romania	3	2	0	0	1	42	47	−5	6	Main round
3	Turkey	3	1	0	0	2	44	55	−11	3	Main round
4	Slovakia	3	0	0	0	3	36	50	−14	0	Classification round

Source: EuropeanAquatics
Rules for classification: 1) points; 2) head-to-head points; 3) head-to-head goal difference; 4) head-to-head number of goals scored; 5) Goal difference.

11 January 2026; 12:45	Report	Turkey	8–19	Italy	Belgrade Arena, Belgrade; Referees: Julien Bourges (FRA), Peter de Jong (NED)
11 January 2026; 12:45	Report	Score by quarters: 1–7, 2–4, 3–4, 2–4			Belgrade Arena, Belgrade; Referees: Julien Bourges (FRA), Peter de Jong (NED)
11 January 2026; 12:45	Report	Kuloğlu 2	Goals	Condemi 4	Belgrade Arena, Belgrade; Referees: Julien Bourges (FRA), Peter de Jong (NED)

11 January 2026; 15:15	Report	Romania	16–8	Slovakia	Belgrade Arena, Belgrade; Referees: Tamás Kovács-Csatlós (HUN), Ivan Raković (SRB)
11 January 2026; 15:15	Report	Score by quarters: 5–3, 4–2, 2–0, 5–3			Belgrade Arena, Belgrade; Referees: Tamás Kovács-Csatlós (HUN), Ivan Raković (SRB)
11 January 2026; 15:15	Report	Georgescu, Belényesi 3	Goals	Seman, Tkáč 2	Belgrade Arena, Belgrade; Referees: Tamás Kovács-Csatlós (HUN), Ivan Raković (SRB)

13 January 2026; 18:00	Report	Slovakia	12–17	Italy	Belgrade Arena, Belgrade; Referees: Ivan Raković (SRB), Eurico Silva (POR)
13 January 2026; 18:00	Report	Score by quarters: 2–5, 3–3, 4–5, 3–4			Belgrade Arena, Belgrade; Referees: Ivan Raković (SRB), Eurico Silva (POR)
13 January 2026; 18:00	Report	Baláž 3	Goals	Di Somma 4	Belgrade Arena, Belgrade; Referees: Ivan Raković (SRB), Eurico Silva (POR)

13 January 2026; 20:30	Report	Romania	20–19	Turkey	Belgrade Arena, Belgrade; Referees: David Gómez (ESP), Tamás Kovács-Csatlós (HUN)
13 January 2026; 20:30	Report	Score by quarters: 4–5, 7–5, 7–5, 2–4			Belgrade Arena, Belgrade; Referees: David Gómez (ESP), Tamás Kovács-Csatlós (HUN)
13 January 2026; 20:30	Report	Georgescu 5	Goals	Düzenli 5	Belgrade Arena, Belgrade; Referees: David Gómez (ESP), Tamás Kovács-Csatlós (HUN)

15 January 2026; 12:45	Report	Turkey	17–16	Slovakia	Belgrade Arena, Belgrade; Referees: Julien Bourges (FRA), Veselin Mišković (MNE)
15 January 2026; 12:45	Report	Score by quarters: 4–2, 1–4, 7–3, 5–7			Belgrade Arena, Belgrade; Referees: Julien Bourges (FRA), Veselin Mišković (MNE)
15 January 2026; 12:45	Report	Naipoğlu 4	Goals	Baláž, Ďurík 6	Belgrade Arena, Belgrade; Referees: Julien Bourges (FRA), Veselin Mišković (MNE)

15 January 2026; 15:15	Report	Romania	6–20	Italy	Belgrade Arena, Belgrade; Referees: Boris Margeta (SLO), Peter de Jong (NED)
15 January 2026; 15:15	Report	Score by quarters: 1–5, 3–4, 0–4, 2–7			Belgrade Arena, Belgrade; Referees: Boris Margeta (SLO), Peter de Jong (NED)
15 January 2026; 15:15	Report	Georgescu, Vancsik 2	Goals	Del Basso 4	Belgrade Arena, Belgrade; Referees: Boris Margeta (SLO), Peter de Jong (NED)

== Classification round ==
Pos	Team	Pld	W	PSW	PSL	L	GF	GA	GD	Pts
13	Malta	3	3	0	0	0	49	38	+11	9
14	Slovakia	3	1	0	1	1	32	38	−6	4
15	Slovenia	3	0	1	1	1	34	35	−1	3
16	Israel	3	0	1	0	2	33	37	−4	2

Source: EuropeanAquatics
Rules for classification: 1) points; 2) head-to-head points; 3) head-to-head goal difference; 4) head-to-head number of goals scored; 5) goal difference.

16 January 2026; 10:15	Report	Malta	15–14	Israel	Belgrade Arena, Belgrade; Referees: Ivan Raković (SRB), Julien Bourges (FRA)
16 January 2026; 10:15	Report	Score by quarters: 5–5, 4–2, 3–4, 3–3			Belgrade Arena, Belgrade; Referees: Ivan Raković (SRB), Julien Bourges (FRA)
16 January 2026; 10:15	Report	Nagaev 6	Goals	Buzaglo, Shafrir 3	Belgrade Arena, Belgrade; Referees: Ivan Raković (SRB), Julien Bourges (FRA)

16 January 2026; 12:45	Report	Slovenia	10–10; PSO: 4–3	Slovakia	Belgrade Arena, Belgrade; Referees: Peter de Jong (NED), Erkan Turkkan (TUR)
16 January 2026; 12:45	Report	Score by quarters: 3–3, 3–3, 3–3, 1–1			Belgrade Arena, Belgrade; Referees: Peter de Jong (NED), Erkan Turkkan (TUR)
16 January 2026; 12:45	Report	three players 2	Goals	Ďurík, Tkáč 3	Belgrade Arena, Belgrade; Referees: Peter de Jong (NED), Erkan Turkkan (TUR)

17 January 2026; 10:15	Report	Slovenia	11–11; PSO: 3–4	Israel	Belgrade Arena, Belgrade; Referees: Veselin Mišković (MNE), Levan Berishvili (GEO)
17 January 2026; 10:15	Report	Score by quarters: 3–2, 1–3, 4–3, 3–3			Belgrade Arena, Belgrade; Referees: Veselin Mišković (MNE), Levan Berishvili (GEO)
17 January 2026; 10:15	Report	Štromajer 4	Goals	three players 3	Belgrade Arena, Belgrade; Referees: Veselin Mišković (MNE), Levan Berishvili (GEO)

17 January 2026; 12:45	Report	Slovakia	11–20	Malta	Belgrade Arena, Belgrade; Referees: Andrej Franulović (CRO), Tamás Kovács-Csatlós (HUN)
17 January 2026; 12:45	Report	Score by quarters: 4–4, 4–7, 1–3, 2–6			Belgrade Arena, Belgrade; Referees: Andrej Franulović (CRO), Tamás Kovács-Csatlós (HUN)
17 January 2026; 12:45	Report	Furman, Caraj 3	Goals	Camilleri 6	Belgrade Arena, Belgrade; Referees: Andrej Franulović (CRO), Tamás Kovács-Csatlós (HUN)

18 January 2026; 10:15	Report	Malta	14–13	Slovenia	Belgrade Arena, Belgrade; Referees: Frank Ohme (GER), Eurico Silva (POR)
18 January 2026; 10:15	Report	Score by quarters: 3–4, 5–4, 3–3, 3–2			Belgrade Arena, Belgrade; Referees: Frank Ohme (GER), Eurico Silva (POR)
18 January 2026; 10:15	Report	Nagaev 5	Goals	Potočnik 4	Belgrade Arena, Belgrade; Referees: Frank Ohme (GER), Eurico Silva (POR)

18 January 2026; 12:45	Report	Slovakia	11–8	Israel	Belgrade Arena, Belgrade; Referees: David Gómez (ESP), Levan Berishvili (GEO)
18 January 2026; 12:45	Report	Score by quarters: 3–2, 3–1, 3–2, 2–3			Belgrade Arena, Belgrade; Referees: David Gómez (ESP), Levan Berishvili (GEO)
18 January 2026; 12:45	Report	Balaz 4	Goals	three players 2	Belgrade Arena, Belgrade; Referees: David Gómez (ESP), Levan Berishvili (GEO)

== Main round ==
All points obtained in the preliminary round against teams that advance as well are carried over.

=== Group E ===
Pos	Team	Pld	W	PSW	PSL	L	GF	GA	GD	Pts	Qualification
1	Serbia (H)	5	3	1	0	1	67	63	+4	11 (Note: Hungary 14–15 Serbia)	Semifinals
2	Hungary	5	3	1	0	1	69	54	+15	11	Semifinals
3	Spain	5	3	0	1	1	64	44	+20	10	
4	Montenegro	5	3	0	0	2	59	63	−4	9	
5	France	5	1	0	0	4	51	66	−15	3	
6	Netherlands	5	0	0	1	4	52	72	−20	1	

Source: EuropeanAquatics
Rules for classification: 1) points; 2) head-to-head points; 3) head-to-head goal difference; 4) head-to-head number of goals scored; 5) goal difference.
(H) Host
Notes:

16 January 2026; 15:30	Report	Montenegro	6–14	Spain	Belgrade Arena, Belgrade; Referees: Boris Margeta (SLO), Raffaele Colombo (ITA)
16 January 2026; 15:30	Report	Score by quarters: 1–4, 2–5, 2–5, 1–0			Belgrade Arena, Belgrade; Referees: Boris Margeta (SLO), Raffaele Colombo (ITA)
16 January 2026; 15:30	Report	Perković 2	Goals	Granados 4	Belgrade Arena, Belgrade; Referees: Boris Margeta (SLO), Raffaele Colombo (ITA)

16 January 2026; 18:00	Report	Hungary	16–11	Netherlands	Belgrade Arena, Belgrade; Referees: Georgios Stavridis (GRE), Levan Berishvili (GEO)
16 January 2026; 18:00	Report	Score by quarters: 4–4, 4–2, 3–4, 5–1			Belgrade Arena, Belgrade; Referees: Georgios Stavridis (GRE), Levan Berishvili (GEO)
16 January 2026; 18:00	Report	Fekete 5	Goals	Te Riele, Van der Weijden 3	Belgrade Arena, Belgrade; Referees: Georgios Stavridis (GRE), Levan Berishvili (GEO)

16 January 2026; 20:30	Report	France	10–14	Serbia	Belgrade Arena, Belgrade; Referees: Frank Ohme (GER), Mihai Balanescu (ROU)
16 January 2026; 20:30	Report	Score by quarters: 2–4, 2–5, 2–3, 4–2			Belgrade Arena, Belgrade; Referees: Frank Ohme (GER), Mihai Balanescu (ROU)
16 January 2026; 20:30	Report	Vernoux 4	Goals	Drašović 3	Belgrade Arena, Belgrade; Referees: Frank Ohme (GER), Mihai Balanescu (ROU)

18 January 2026; 15:30	Report	France	8–14	Spain	Belgrade Arena, Belgrade; Referees: Georgios Stavridis (GRE), Andrej Franulović (CRO)
18 January 2026; 15:30	Report	Score by quarters: 1–2, 2–3, 3–5, 2–4			Belgrade Arena, Belgrade; Referees: Georgios Stavridis (GRE), Andrej Franulović (CRO)
18 January 2026; 15:30	Report	Bouet 3	Goals	six players 2	Belgrade Arena, Belgrade; Referees: Georgios Stavridis (GRE), Andrej Franulović (CRO)

18 January 2026; 18:00	Report	Montenegro	15–11	Netherlands	Belgrade Arena, Belgrade; Referees: Raffaele Colombo (ITA), Mihai Balanescu (ROU)
18 January 2026; 18:00	Report	Score by quarters: 1–3, 6–6, 3–1, 5–1			Belgrade Arena, Belgrade; Referees: Raffaele Colombo (ITA), Mihai Balanescu (ROU)
18 January 2026; 18:00	Report	Vučković 4	Goals	Hessels 4	Belgrade Arena, Belgrade; Referees: Raffaele Colombo (ITA), Mihai Balanescu (ROU)

18 January 2026; 20:30	Report	Hungary	14–15	Serbia	Belgrade Arena, Belgrade; Referees: Boris Margeta (SLO), Matan Schwartz (ISR)
18 January 2026; 20:30	Report	Score by quarters: 4–4, 3–4, 1–5, 6–2			Belgrade Arena, Belgrade; Referees: Boris Margeta (SLO), Matan Schwartz (ISR)
18 January 2026; 20:30	Report	Nagy 4	Goals	Jakšić, Mandić 3	Belgrade Arena, Belgrade; Referees: Boris Margeta (SLO), Matan Schwartz (ISR)

20 January 2026; 15:30	Report	Netherlands	10–14	France	Belgrade Arena, Belgrade; Referees: Andrej Franulović (CRO), Eurico Silva (POR)
20 January 2026; 15:30	Report	Score by quarters: 1–3, 2–2, 2–4, 5–5			Belgrade Arena, Belgrade; Referees: Andrej Franulović (CRO), Eurico Silva (POR)
20 January 2026; 15:30	Report	Gbadamassi, de Weerd 2	Goals	Vernoux 6	Belgrade Arena, Belgrade; Referees: Andrej Franulović (CRO), Eurico Silva (POR)

20 January 2026; 18:00	Report	Spain	11–11; PSO: 3–4	Hungary	Belgrade Arena, Belgrade; Referees: Frank Ohme (GER), Peter de Jong (NED)
20 January 2026; 18:00	Report	Score by quarters: 3–3, 2–2, 3–3, 3–3			Belgrade Arena, Belgrade; Referees: Frank Ohme (GER), Peter de Jong (NED)
20 January 2026; 18:00	Report	Cabanas 4	Goals	Nagy 3	Belgrade Arena, Belgrade; Referees: Frank Ohme (GER), Peter de Jong (NED)

20 January 2026; 20:30	Report	Serbia	13–15	Montenegro	Belgrade Arena, Belgrade; Referees: Mihai Balanescu (ROU), Levan Berishvili (GEO)
20 January 2026; 20:30	Report	Score by quarters: 6–5, 4–3, 2–4, 1–3			Belgrade Arena, Belgrade; Referees: Mihai Balanescu (ROU), Levan Berishvili (GEO)
20 January 2026; 20:30	Report	Mandić 3	Goals	Vučković 4	Belgrade Arena, Belgrade; Referees: Mihai Balanescu (ROU), Levan Berishvili (GEO)

=== Group F ===
Pos	Team	Pld	W	PSW	PSL	L	GF	GA	GD	Pts	Qualification
1	Greece	5	5	0	0	0	84	46	+38	15	Semifinals
2	Italy	5	4	0	0	1	81	53	+28	12	Semifinals
3	Croatia	5	3	0	0	2	77	49	+28	9	
4	Romania	5	2	0	0	3	59	84	−25	6	
5	Georgia	5	1	0	0	4	51	80	−29	3	
6	Turkey	5	0	0	0	5	55	95	−40	0	

Source: EuropeanAquatics
Rules for classification: 1) points; 2) head-to-head points; 3) head-to-head goal difference; 4) head-to-head number of goals scored; 5) goal difference.

17 January 2026; 15:30	Report	Georgia	14–16	Italy	Belgrade Arena, Belgrade; Referees: David Gómez (ESP), Alex De Raffaele (MLT)
17 January 2026; 15:30	Report	Score by quarters: 2–2, 4–6, 4–6, 4–2			Belgrade Arena, Belgrade; Referees: David Gómez (ESP), Alex De Raffaele (MLT)
17 January 2026; 15:30	Report	Dadvani, Pjesivac 3	Goals	Bruni 5	Belgrade Arena, Belgrade; Referees: David Gómez (ESP), Alex De Raffaele (MLT)

17 January 2026; 18:00	Report	Greece	20–8	Turkey	Belgrade Arena, Belgrade; Referees: Peter de Jong (NED), Eurico Silva (POR)
17 January 2026; 18:00	Report	Score by quarters: 6–3, 6–1, 4–3, 4–1			Belgrade Arena, Belgrade; Referees: Peter de Jong (NED), Eurico Silva (POR)
17 January 2026; 18:00	Report	Papanastasiou 6	Goals	Düzenli 3	Belgrade Arena, Belgrade; Referees: Peter de Jong (NED), Eurico Silva (POR)

17 January 2026; 20:30	Report	Croatia	17–9	Romania	Belgrade Arena, Belgrade; Referees: Frank Ohme (GER), Julien Bourges (FRA)
17 January 2026; 20:30	Report	Score by quarters: 5–1, 1–2, 5–3, 6–3			Belgrade Arena, Belgrade; Referees: Frank Ohme (GER), Julien Bourges (FRA)
17 January 2026; 20:30	Report	Kharkov 5	Goals	Neamtu 4	Belgrade Arena, Belgrade; Referees: Frank Ohme (GER), Julien Bourges (FRA)

19 January 2026; 15:30	Report	Georgia	10–15	Romania	Belgrade Arena, Belgrade; Referees: Tamás Kovács-Csatlós (HUN), Peter de Jong (NED)
19 January 2026; 15:30	Report	Score by quarters: 2–2, 4–4, 1–2, 3–7			Belgrade Arena, Belgrade; Referees: Tamás Kovács-Csatlós (HUN), Peter de Jong (NED)
19 January 2026; 15:30	Report	Vasić 5	Goals	three players 4	Belgrade Arena, Belgrade; Referees: Tamás Kovács-Csatlós (HUN), Peter de Jong (NED)

19 January 2026; 18:00	Report	Greece	15–13	Italy	Belgrade Arena, Belgrade; Referees: Ivan Raković (SRB), Julien Bourges (FRA)
19 January 2026; 18:00	Report	Score by quarters: 2–1, 4–3, 4–3, 5–6			Belgrade Arena, Belgrade; Referees: Ivan Raković (SRB), Julien Bourges (FRA)
19 January 2026; 18:00	Report	Argyropoulos 4	Goals	Iocchi 5	Belgrade Arena, Belgrade; Referees: Ivan Raković (SRB), Julien Bourges (FRA)

19 January 2026; 20:30	Report	Croatia	22–9	Turkey	Belgrade Arena, Belgrade; Referees: David Gómez (ESP), Peter Radič (SVK)
19 January 2026; 20:30	Report	Score by quarters: 6–1, 5–2, 6–4, 5–2			Belgrade Arena, Belgrade; Referees: David Gómez (ESP), Peter Radič (SVK)
19 January 2026; 20:30	Report	Žuvela 5	Goals	Oğuzcan, Yutmaz 2	Belgrade Arena, Belgrade; Referees: David Gómez (ESP), Peter Radič (SVK)

21 January 2026; 15:30	Report	Turkey	11–14	Georgia	Belgrade Arena, Belgrade; Referees: Boris Margeta (SLO), Raffaele Colombo (ITA)
21 January 2026; 15:30	Report	Score by quarters: 3–1, 3–5, 3–2, 2–6			Belgrade Arena, Belgrade; Referees: Boris Margeta (SLO), Raffaele Colombo (ITA)
21 January 2026; 15:30	Report	Düzenli 6	Goals	Vasić 4	Belgrade Arena, Belgrade; Referees: Boris Margeta (SLO), Raffaele Colombo (ITA)

21 January 2026; 18:00	Report	Italy	13–10	Croatia	Belgrade Arena, Belgrade; Referees: Georgios Stavridis (GRE), Tamás Kovács-Csatlós (HUN)
21 January 2026; 18:00	Report	Score by quarters: 3–3, 2–0, 2–4, 6–3			Belgrade Arena, Belgrade; Referees: Georgios Stavridis (GRE), Tamás Kovács-Csatlós (HUN)
21 January 2026; 18:00	Report	Ferrero 4	Goals	Burić, Fatović 3	Belgrade Arena, Belgrade; Referees: Georgios Stavridis (GRE), Tamás Kovács-Csatlós (HUN)

21 January 2026; 20:30	Report	Romania	9–18	Greece	Belgrade Arena, Belgrade; Referees: Peter de Jong (NED), Erkan Turkkan (TUR)
21 January 2026; 20:30	Report	Score by quarters: 0–5, 1–4, 4–4, 4–5			Belgrade Arena, Belgrade; Referees: Peter de Jong (NED), Erkan Turkkan (TUR)
21 January 2026; 20:30	Report	Georgescu 4	Goals	Genidounias 4	Belgrade Arena, Belgrade; Referees: Peter de Jong (NED), Erkan Turkkan (TUR)

== Knockout stage ==
Semi-finals
23 January
Serbia	17
Italy	13
23 January
Greece	12
Hungary	15

Final
25 January
Serbia	10
Hungary	7
Third place
25 January
Italy	5
Greece	12

=== Semifinals ===
23 January 2026; 17:00	Report	Greece	12–15	Hungary	Belgrade Arena, Belgrade; Referees: Andrej Franulović (CRO), Julien Bourges (FRA)
23 January 2026; 17:00	Report	Score by quarters: 5–4, 3–4, 2–4, 2–3			Belgrade Arena, Belgrade; Referees: Andrej Franulović (CRO), Julien Bourges (FRA)
23 January 2026; 17:00	Report	Kakaris 3	Goals	Manhercz 4	Belgrade Arena, Belgrade; Referees: Andrej Franulović (CRO), Julien Bourges (FRA)

23 January 2026; 20:30	Report	Serbia	17–13	Italy	Belgrade Arena, Belgrade; Attendance: 12,000; Referees: Boris Margeta (SLO), David Gómez (ESP)
23 January 2026; 20:30	Report	Score by quarters: 5–3, 4–4, 6–3, 2–3			Belgrade Arena, Belgrade; Attendance: 12,000; Referees: Boris Margeta (SLO), David Gómez (ESP)
23 January 2026; 20:30	Report	Mandić, Rašović 4	Goals	three players 3	Belgrade Arena, Belgrade; Attendance: 12,000; Referees: Boris Margeta (SLO), David Gómez (ESP)

=== Eleventh place game ===
22 January 2026; 12:45	Report	Netherlands	25–8	Turkey	Belgrade Arena, Belgrade; Referees: Ivan Raković (SRB), Alex De Raffaele (MLT)
22 January 2026; 12:45	Report	Score by quarters: 8–2, 5–2, 5–3, 7–1			Belgrade Arena, Belgrade; Referees: Ivan Raković (SRB), Alex De Raffaele (MLT)
22 January 2026; 12:45	Report	Ten Broek 7	Goals	Caner 4	Belgrade Arena, Belgrade; Referees: Ivan Raković (SRB), Alex De Raffaele (MLT)

=== Ninth place game ===
22 January 2026; 15:15	Report	France	16–13	Georgia	Belgrade Arena, Belgrade; Referees: David Gómez (ESP), Veselin Mišković (MNE)
22 January 2026; 15:15	Report	Score by quarters: 4–2, 6–4, 4–4, 2–3			Belgrade Arena, Belgrade; Referees: David Gómez (ESP), Veselin Mišković (MNE)
22 January 2026; 15:15	Report	Bouet 4	Goals	Shushiashvili, Tkeshelashvili 3	Belgrade Arena, Belgrade; Referees: David Gómez (ESP), Veselin Mišković (MNE)

=== Seventh place game ===
22 January 2026; 18:00	Report	Montenegro	21–15	Romania	Belgrade Arena, Belgrade; Referees: Matan Schwartz (ISR), Peter Radič (SVK)
22 January 2026; 18:00	Report	Score by quarters: 4–3, 6–3, 5–4, 6–5			Belgrade Arena, Belgrade; Referees: Matan Schwartz (ISR), Peter Radič (SVK)
22 January 2026; 18:00	Report	Vučković 6	Goals	Georgescu 5	Belgrade Arena, Belgrade; Referees: Matan Schwartz (ISR), Peter Radič (SVK)

=== Fifth place game ===
22 January 2026; 20:30	Report	Spain	17–9	Croatia	Belgrade Arena, Belgrade; Referees: Raffaele Colombo (ITA), Mihai Balanescu (ROU)
22 January 2026; 20:30	Report	Score by quarters: 3–0, 4–2, 6–5, 4–2			Belgrade Arena, Belgrade; Referees: Raffaele Colombo (ITA), Mihai Balanescu (ROU)
22 January 2026; 20:30	Report	Sanahuja 5	Goals	Kharkov 3	Belgrade Arena, Belgrade; Referees: Raffaele Colombo (ITA), Mihai Balanescu (ROU)

=== Third place game ===
25 January 2026; 17:00	Report	Italy	5–12	Greece	Belgrade Arena, Belgrade; Referees: Matan Schwartz (ISR), Tamás Kovács-Csatlós (HUN)
25 January 2026; 17:00	Report	Score by quarters: 1–4, 1–3, 2–3, 1–2			Belgrade Arena, Belgrade; Referees: Matan Schwartz (ISR), Tamás Kovács-Csatlós (HUN)
25 January 2026; 17:00	Report	Condemi, Ferrero 2	Goals	Argyropoulos 4	Belgrade Arena, Belgrade; Referees: Matan Schwartz (ISR), Tamás Kovács-Csatlós (HUN)

=== Final ===
25 January 2026; 20:30	Report	Serbia	10–7	Hungary	Belgrade Arena, Belgrade; Referees: Frank Ohme (GER), Julien Bourges (FRA)
25 January 2026; 20:30	Report	Score by quarters: 3–2, 2–3, 2–1, 3–1			Belgrade Arena, Belgrade; Referees: Frank Ohme (GER), Julien Bourges (FRA)
25 January 2026; 20:30	Report	Mandić 4	Goals	Vígvári 3	Belgrade Arena, Belgrade; Referees: Frank Ohme (GER), Julien Bourges (FRA)

== Final standings ==
=== Best results ===
Team	Previous	New
Greece	4th (1999, 2016)	3rd
Malta	14th (2022)	13th

=== Rankings table ===
Pos	Team	Pld	W	PSW	PSL	L	GF	GA	GD	Pts	Final result
1	Serbia (H)	8	6	1	0	1	113	92	+21	20	Champions
2	Hungary	8	5	1	0	2	112	82	+30	17	Runners-up
3	Greece	8	7	0	0	1	131	74	+57	21	Third place
4	Italy	8	5	0	0	3	116	94	+22	15	Fourth place
5	Spain	7	5	0	1	1	109	56	+53	16	Fifth place game
6	Croatia	7	4	0	0	3	106	70	+36	12	Fifth place game
7	Montenegro	7	5	0	0	2	101	90	+11	15	Seventh place game
8	Romania	7	3	0	0	4	90	113	−23	9	Seventh place game
9	France	7	3	0	0	4	89	92	−3	9	Ninth place game
10	Georgia	7	2	0	0	5	86	107	−21	6	Ninth place game
11	Netherlands	7	2	0	1	4	96	91	+5	7	Eleventh place game
12	Turkey	7	1	0	0	6	80	136	−56	3	Eleventh place game
13	Malta	6	3	0	0	3	80	102	−22	9	Classification round
14	Slovakia	6	1	0	1	4	68	88	−20	4	Classification round
15	Slovenia	6	0	1	1	4	57	100	−43	3	Classification round
16	Israel	6	0	1	0	5	56	103	−47	2	Classification round

Updated to match(es) played on 25 January 2026. Source: EuropeanAquatics
Rules for classification: 1) points; 2) head-to-head points; 3) head-to-head goal difference; 4) head-to-head number of goals scored; 5) Goal difference.
(H) Host

=== Qualification table ===
Rank	Team	Qualification	
Rank	Team	WC	EC
1st place, gold medalist(s)	Serbia	Q	Q
2nd place, silver medalist(s)	Hungary	Q	Q
3rd place, bronze medalist(s)	Greece	Q	Q
4	Italy		Q
5	Spain		Q
6	Croatia		Q
7	Montenegro		Q
8	Romania		Q
9	France		
10	Georgia		
11	Netherlands		
12	Turkey		
13	Malta		
14	Slovakia		
15	Slovenia		
16	Israel		

Q	Qualified directly to a main tournament

Method of qualification

Qualified for the phase indicated based on this tournament

2026 Men's European Water Polo Championship

Serbia
Ninth title

Team roster: Radoslav Filipović, Dušan Mandić, Strahinja Rašović, Sava Ranđelović, Miloš Ćuk, Đorđe Lazić, Radomir Drašović, Nikola Jakšić, Nemanja Vico, Nikola Dedović, Petar Jakšić, Viktor Rašović, Milan Glušac, Vasilije Martinović, Nikola Lukić.
Head Coach: Uroš Stevanović

=== All Star Team ===
The all-star team was announced on 25 January 2026.

Position	Player
Goalkeeper	(Serbia) Milan Glušac
Field player	(Serbia) Dušan Mandić
Field player	(Serbia) Strahinja Rašović
Field player	(Hungary) Krisztián Manhercz
Field player	(Hungary) Ádám Nagy
Field player	(Greece) Stylianos Argyropoulos
Field player	(Greece) Konstantinos Kakaris

== Statistics ==
=== Top goalscorers ===
Rank	Name	Goals	Shots	%
1	(Greece) Stylianos Argyropoulos	26	38	68
1	(France) Thomas Vernoux	26	53	49
3	(Romania) Vlad-Luca Georgescu	24	43	56
4	(Malta) Steven Camilleri	22	45	49
5	(Serbia) Dušan Mandić	20	35	57
5	(Montenegro) Balsa Vučković	20	35	57
5	(Netherlands) Kas te Riele	20	37	54
8	(Montenegro) Dušan Matković	19	32	59
8	(Serbia) Strahinja Rašović	19	37	51
8	(Romania) Andrei-Radu-Ionuț Neamțu	19	38	50
8	(Turkey) Yuşa Han Düzenli	19	42	45

=== Top scoring teams ===
Rank	Name	Goals	Shots	%
1	Greece	131	273	48
2	Italy	116	286	40.6
3	Serbia	113	270	41.9
4	Hungary	112	274	45.3
5	Spain	109	240	45.4
6	Croatia	106	241	44
7	Montenegro	101	241	41.9
8	Netherlands	96	248	38.7
9	Romania	90	203	44.3
10	France	89	208	42.8
11	Georgia	86	228	37.7
12	Malta	80	194	41.2
13	Turkey	80	208	38.5
14	Slovakia	68	176	38.6
15	Slovenia	57	183	31.1
16	Israel	56	186	30.1

=== Top assisting teams ===
Rank	Team	Assists
1	Serbia	60
2	Hungary	58
3	Spain	57
4	Greece	54
4	Italy	54
6	Croatia	42
7	France	35
8	Turkey	33
9	Slovakia	32
10	Romania	29
11	Montenegro	28
12	Netherlands	24
13	Georgia	20
14	Malta	19
15	Israel	16
16	Slovenia	8

=== Top sprinting teams ===
Rank	Name	Sprints	%
1	Croatia	23/28	82.1
2	Netherlands	22/28	78.5
2	Hungary	22/32	68.7
2	Italy	22/32	68.7
5	Greece	18/32	56.2
6	Serbia	16/32	50
7	Montenegro	15/28	53.5
8	Georgia	12/28	42.8
9	France	11/28	39.2
9	Spain	11/28	39.2
11	Slovenia	10/24	41.6
11	Romania	10/28	35.7
11	Turkey	10/28	35.7
14	Slovakia	9/24	37.5
15	Malta	8/24	33.3
16	Israel	5/24	20.8

=== Discipline ===
The following suspensions were served during the tournament:

Player	Offence(s)	Suspension(s)	Ref
(Serbia) Dušan Mandić	(red card) in Group C vs Spain (matchday 2; 12 January)	Group C vs Israel (matchday 3; 14 January), Group E vs France (matchday 4; 16 January)	
(Spain) Álvaro Granados	(red card) in Group C vs Serbia (matchday 2; 12 January)	Group C vs Netherlands (matchday 3; 14 January)	
(Greece) Dinos Genidounias	(red card) in Group B vs Croatia (matchday 3; 15 January)	Group F vs Turkey (matchday 4; 17 January), Group F vs Italy (matchday 5; 19 January)	

=== Player of the match ===
For the first time, player of the match awards will be given during the knockout stage. A player of the match award is given to the player deemed as playing the best in each match.

Round	Team	Match	Team	Player	Ref
Semifinals	Serbia	17–13	Italy	(Serbia) Milan Glušac	
Semifinals	Greece	12–15	Hungary	(Hungary) Krisztián Manhercz	
Third place game	Italy	5–12	Greece	(Greece) Konstantinos Kakaris	
Final	Serbia	10–7	Hungary	(Serbia) Dušan Mandić	

==== Notable statistics ====
- Most goals in a game: 39 (Romania 20–19 Turkey, 13 January)
- Least goals in a game: 17 (Italy 5–12 Greece, 25 January; Serbia 10–7 Hungary, 25 January)
- Most goals by a team in a game: 28 (Spain 28–3 Israel, 10 January)
- Least goals by a team in a game: 3 (Israel 3–28 Spain, 10 January)
- Biggest goal difference in a game: 25 (Israel 3–28 Spain, 10 January)
- Biggest half time deficit in a game: 12 (Israel 3–15 Spain, 10 January)
- Most goals scored by a player in a game: 7 ( (Netherlands) Lars ten Broek vs Turkey, 22 January)

== Controversies ==
=== Schedule change ===
The championship was originally slated for the summer of 2026. However, European Aquatics announced in March 2025 that this edition would actually take place in January 2026, in a timeslot that clashes significantly with the 2026 European Men's Handball Championship. Reportedly, sources close to the European Handball Federation stated that they were surprised with this decision as the European Men's Handball Championship has always been in January without any competition from other sports and now they might have fight for prime-time slots with water polo.

French handball legend, Nikola Karabatić also said this about the situation:

“We’ve built the Handball EURO as a January tradition for decades. And now water polo suddenly appeared in the same window… it changes everything.”

=== Maltese match-fixing scandal ===
On 16 January 2026, players from Malta were accused of placing bets on their own games. Around four players are being suspected, with the match against Montenegro being investigated particularly. Speaking about the situation, Karl Izzo, president of the Aquatic Sports Association of Malta, said the following:

“God forbid they are true, because that would tarnish the hard work that the association has done to push the sport forward over the past years. The ASA firmly upholds the principles of integrity, transparency, and fair play, which are fundamental to sport at all levels. While we take any allegation of this nature seriously, it is imperative to emphasise that allegations remain allegations unless and until established through due process by the competent authorities. The ASA reiterates its full commitment to cooperate openly and fully with all relevant national and international authorities should any investigation be formally initiated or any request for assistance be made.

On 1 April 2026, European Aquatics announced a full investigation regarding the incident. On 20 July 2026, European Aquatics sanctioned 10 Maltese players and 1 coach due breaching the betting rules.

== Broadcasting rights ==
The television channels broadcasting the event is as follows:

Territory	Rights holder
Bulgaria	BNT
Croatia	HRT
Cyprus	CyBC
Georgia	GPB
Greece	ERT
Hungary	MTVA
Israel	The Sports Channel
Italy	RAI
Lithuania	LRT
Malta	PBS
Montenegro	RTCG
Netherlands	NOS
Poland	TVP
Romania	TVR
Serbia	RTS
Spain	RTVE
Rest of World	Eurovision Sports

== Notes ==
Reference
Matchday 1 Day 1
Matchday 1 Day 2
Matchday 2 Day 3
Matchday 2 Day 4
Matchday 3 Day 5
Matchday 3 Day 6
Matchday 4 Day 7
Matchday 4 Day 8
Matchday 5 Day 9
Matchday 5 Day 10
Matchday 6 Day 11
Matchday 6 Day 12
Matchday 7 Day 13
Matchday 7 Day 14
Matchday 8

Reference
Matchday 1 Day 1
Matchday 1 Day 2
Matchday 2 Day 3
Matchday 2 Day 4
Matchday 3 Day 5
Matchday 3 Day 6
Matchday 4 Day 7
Matchday 4 Day 8
Matchday 5 Day 9
Matchday 5 Day 10
Matchday 6 Day 11
Matchday 6 Day 12
Matchday 7 Day 13
Matchday 7 Day 14
Matchday 8
