= Water polo at the 2000 Summer Olympics – Men's qualification =

The 2000 Men's Olympic Water Polo Qualifying Tournament was held at the Stadionbad indoor-pool in Hanover, Germany, from May 6 to May 14, 2000. The competition decided the remaining five competing teams at the 2000 Summer Olympics in Sydney, Australia. Fifteen teams entered the competition. Africa did not send a team.

== Teams ==
GROUP A

- France
- Greece
- Romania
- Uzbekistan

GROUP B

- Brazil
- Netherlands
- Slovenia
- Yugoslavia

GROUP C

- Cuba
- Poland
- Russia

GROUP D

- Canada
- Colombia
- Germany
- Slovakia

== Preliminary round ==
=== GROUP A ===
	Team	Points	G	W	D	L	GF	GA	Diff
1.	France	4	3	2	0	1	27	10	+17
2.	Greece	4	3	2	0	1	27	17	+10
3.	Romania	4	3	2	0	1	23	15	+8
4.	Uzbekistan	0	3	0	0	3	14	49	–35

- May 6, 2000

Greece	3 – 8	France
Romania	15 – 6	Uzbekistan

- May 7, 2000

France	3 – 4	Romania
Greece	18 – 5	Uzbekistan

- May 8, 2000

France	16 – 3	Uzbekistan
Greece	6 – 4	Romania

=== GROUP B ===
	Team	Points	G	W	D	L	GF	GA	Diff
1.	Yugoslavia	6	3	3	0	0	37	13	+24
2.	Netherlands	4	3	2	0	1	28	25	+3
3.	Brazil	2	3	1	0	2	21	36	–15
4.	Slovenia	0	3	0	0	3	23	35	–12

- May 6, 2000

Slovenia	4 – 13	Yugoslavia
Netherlands	12 – 6	Brazil

- May 7, 2000

Yugoslavia	10 – 5	Netherlands
Slovenia	10 – 11	Brazil

- May 8, 2000

Yugoslavia	14 – 4	Brazil
Slovenia	9 – 11	Netherlands

=== GROUP C ===
	Team	Points	G	W	D	L	GF	GA	Diff
1.	Russia	4	2	2	0	0	23	12	+11
2.	Cuba	1	2	0	1	1	14	16	–2
3.	Poland	1	2	0	1	1	12	21	–9

- May 6, 2000

Russia	9 – 7	Cuba

- May 7, 2000

Poland	5 – 14	Russia

- May 8, 2000

Poland	7 – 7	Cuba

=== GROUP D ===
	Team	Points	G	W	D	L	GF	GA	Diff
1.	Slovakia	6	3	3	0	0	34	20	+14
2.	Germany	4	3	2	0	1	36	19	+17
3.	Canada	2	3	1	0	2	19	25	–6
4.	Colombia	0	3	0	0	3	14	39	–25

- May 6, 2000

Colombia	2 – 8	Canada
Slovakia	9 – 7	Germany

- May 7, 2000

Canada	6 – 16	Slovakia
Colombia	5 – 22	Germany

- May 8, 2000

Colombia	7 – 9	Slovakia
Canada	5 – 7	Germany

== Second round ==
=== GROUP E ===
	Team	Points	G	W	D	L	GF	GA	Diff
1.	Yugoslavia	9	5	4	1	0	—	—	—
2.	Greece	7	5	3	1	1	—	—	—
3.	Netherlands	6	5	3	0	2	—	—	—
4.	Romania	4	5	2	0	3	—	—	—
5.	Brazil	2	5	1	0	4	—	—	—
6.	France	2	5	1	0	4	—	—	—

- May 10, 2000

Brazil	6 – 4	France
Greece	8 – 8	Yugoslavia
Netherlands	11 – 10	Romania

- May 11, 2000

Yugoslavia	8 – 4	Romania
Greece	9 – 7	Brazil
Netherlands	7 – 6	France

- May 12, 2000

Greece	6 – 3	Netherlands
Romania	11 – 8	Brazil
France	5 – 12	Yugoslavia

=== GROUP F ===
	Team	Points	G	W	D	L	GF	GA	Diff
1.	Russia	10	5	5	0	0	—	—	—
2.	Slovakia	8	5	4	0	1	—	—	—
3.	Germany	6	5	3	0	2	—	—	—
4.	Cuba	3	5	1	1	3	—	—	—
5.	Poland	3	5	1	1	3	—	—	—
6.	Canada	0	5	0	0	5	—	—	—

- May 10, 2000

Russia	11 – 7	Canada
Slovakia	11 – 4	Poland
Germany	12 – 8	Cuba

- May 11, 2000

Slovakia	10 – 4	Cuba
Poland	7 – 5	Canada
Russia	10 – 7	Germany

- May 12, 2000

Poland	3 – 6	Germany
Cuba	7 – 3	Canada
Russia	10 – 4	Slovakia

=== GROUP G ===
	Team	Points	G	W	D	L	GF	GA	Diff
13.	Slovenia	4	2	2	0	0	30	10	+20
14.	Colombia	2	2	1	0	1	18	20	–2
15.	Uzbekistan	0	2	0	0	2	12	30	–18

- May 10, 2000

Colombia	11 – 9	Uzbekistan

- May 11, 2000

Slovenia	19 – 3	Uzbekistan

- May 12, 2000

Slovenia	11 – 7	Colombia

== Play-Offs ==
- May 13, 2000 — 9th/12th place

Poland	9 – 7	France
Brazil	8 – 7	Canada

- May 13, 2000 — 5th/8th place

Romania	10 – 8	Germany
Netherlands	8 – 7	Cuba

- May 13, 2000 — 1st/4th place

Russia	11 – 5	Greece
Yugoslavia	14 – 5	Slovakia

== Finals ==
- May 14, 2000 — Eleventh place

France	9 – 6	Canada

- May 14, 2000 — Ninth place

Brazil	9 – 4	Poland

- May 14, 2000 — Seventh place

Germany	13 – 6	Cuba

- May 14, 2000 — Fifth place

Netherlands	7 – 5	Romania

- May 14, 2000 — Third place

Greece	9 – 7	Slovakia

- May 14, 2000 — First place

Yugoslavia	10 – 7	Russia

== Final ranking ==
Rank	Team
1.	Yugoslavia
2.	Russia
3.	Greece
4.	Slovakia
5.	Netherlands
6.	Romania
7.	Germany
8.	Cuba
9.	Brazil
10.	Poland
11.	France
12.	Canada
13.	Slovenia
14.	Colombia
15.	Uzbekistan

- Yugoslavia, Russia, Greece, Slovakia and the Netherlands qualified for the 2000 Summer Olympics in Sydney, Australia

== Individual awards ==
- Most Valuable Player
- Best Goalkeeper
- Best Scorer

== See also ==
- 2000 Women's Water Polo Olympic Qualifier
