= 2005 FINA Men's World Water Polo Championship Qualifier =

The 2005 FINA Men's World Water Polo Championship Qualifier was a tournament to decide the remaining three competing nations from Europe for the eleventh edition of FINA Men's World Water Polo Championship, held in Montreal, Canada later that year. The event was staged in Imperia, Italy from January 4 to January 9, 2005.

== Teams ==
GROUP A

- Belarus
- Croatia
- Romania
- Slovenia

GROUP B

- France
- Italy
- Netherlands
- Slovakia

== Preliminary round ==
=== Group A ===
	Team	Points	G	W	D	L	GF	GA	Diff
1.	Croatia	6	3	3	0	0	39	20	+19
2.	Romania	4	3	2	0	1	30	21	+9
3.	Slovenia	2	3	1	0	2	27	26	+1
4.	Belarus	0	3	0	0	3	11	40	–29

- Tuesday January 4, 2005

Croatia	15 – 3	Belarus
Romania	10 – 5	Slovenia

- Wednesday January 5, 2005

Croatia	13 – 8	Slovenia
Romania	11 – 5	Belarus

- Thursday January 6, 2005

Croatia	11 – 9	Romania
Slovenia	14 – 3	Belarus

=== Group B ===
	Team	Points	G	W	D	L	GF	GA	Diff
1.	Italy	6	3	3	0	0	32	16	+16
2.	Slovakia	4	3	2	0	1	27	29	–2
3.	Netherlands	2	3	1	0	2	20	21	–1
4.	France	0	3	0	0	3	20	33	–13

- Tuesday January 4, 2005

Slovakia	11 – 9	France
Italy	7 – 3	Netherlands

- Wednesday January 5, 2005

Italy	14 – 7	France
Netherlands	9 – 10	Slovakia

- Thursday January 6, 2005

Italy	11 – 6	Slovakia
Netherlands	8 – 4	France

== Quarterfinals ==
- Friday January 7, 2005

Slovenia	5 – 7	Slovakia
Netherlands	5 – 8	Romania

== Semifinals ==
- Saturday January 8, 2005

Croatia	11 – 6	Slovakia
Italy	9 – 7	Romania

== Finals ==
- Friday January 7, 2005 — 7th place

France	13 – 8	Belarus

- Saturday January 8, 2005 — 5th place

Netherlands	10 – 5	Slovenia

- Sunday January 9, 2005 — 3rd place

Romania	7 – 6	Slovakia

- Sunday January 9, 2005 — 1st place

Italy	4 – 5	Croatia

== Final ranking ==
RANK	TEAM
1.	Croatia
2.	Italy
3.	Romania
4.	Slovakia
5.	Netherlands
6.	Slovenia
7.	France
8.	Belarus

Croatia, Italy and Romania qualified for the FINA Men's World Water Polo Championship, held in Montréal, Canada, joining Australia, Canada, Germany, Greece, Hungary, Russia, Serbia and Montenegro, Spain, and the United States.

== Individual awards ==
- Most Valuable Player
  - ???
- Best Goalkeeper
  - ???
- Topscorer
  - ???
