= Israel national water polo team =

Israel national water polo team may refer to:

- Israel men's national water polo team
- Israel women's national water polo team
