= Milan Glušac (water polo) =

Serbian water polo player

Personal information
- Nationality: Serbian
- Born: 30 September 2002 (age 24) Belgrade, FR Yugoslavia

Sport
- Sport: Water polo
- Current club: Novi Beograd

Senior clubs
- Years: Team
- 2024–present: Novi Beograd
Medal record
Men's water polo
Representing Serbia
European Championship
Gold medal – first place	2026 Belgrade
Mediterranean Games
Bronze medal – third place	2026 Taranto	Team

Milan Glušac (born 30 September 2002) is a Serbian water polo player who plays as goalkeeper for Novi Beograd. He also represents the Serbia men's national water polo team at international level.

== Biography ==
Glušac took his first steps in water polo at Partizan Belgrade. He played for NBG Vukovi, and then in 2024 he moved to Novi Beograd.

Glušac also represents the Serbia men's national water polo team at international level, with whom he won the gold medal at the 2026 Men's European Water Polo Championship.

== Honours ==
=== Club ===
Novi Beograd

- Serbian Cup: 2024–25

== Awards ==
- Best Goalkeeper of 2026 European Championship
