= Slovakia men's national water polo team =

Men's national water polo team representing Slovakia

Slovakia
- FINA code: SVK
- Nickname(s): Repre (The National team)
- Association: Slovak Swimming Federation
- Confederation: LEN (Europe)
- Head coach: Roman Polačik
- Asst coach: Karol Bačo
- Captain: Samuel Baláž
- Top scorer(s): Karol Bačo
- Home venue: NVPC Nováky

FINA ranking (since 2008)
- Current: 17 (as of 31 July 2023)
- Highest: 17 (2023)
- Lowest: 27 (2019)

Olympic Games
- Appearances: 1 (first in 2000)
- Best result: 12th place (2000)

World Championship
- Appearances: 3 (first in 1998)
- Best result: 8th place (2003)

World Cup
- Appearances: 0

World League
- Appearances: 4 (first in 2014)

European Championship
- Appearances: 14 (first in 1993)
- Best result: 7th place (2003)

The Slovakia men's national water polo team is the representative for Slovakia in international men's water polo. The governing body is from 2017 Slovak Swimming Federation (Slovak: Slovenská plavecká federácia). It was established in 1993 as the successor state of the Czechoslovakia, so all its results fully belong to it.

== History ==
=== History before 1993 ===
During Second World War in the years 1939 to 1945, when there was First Slovak Republic, the then national team played several friendly international matches. They completed their first match in 1942 in Zagreb, where they lost 2 : 3 to the Croatian men's national water polo team.

=== After Independence in 1993 ===
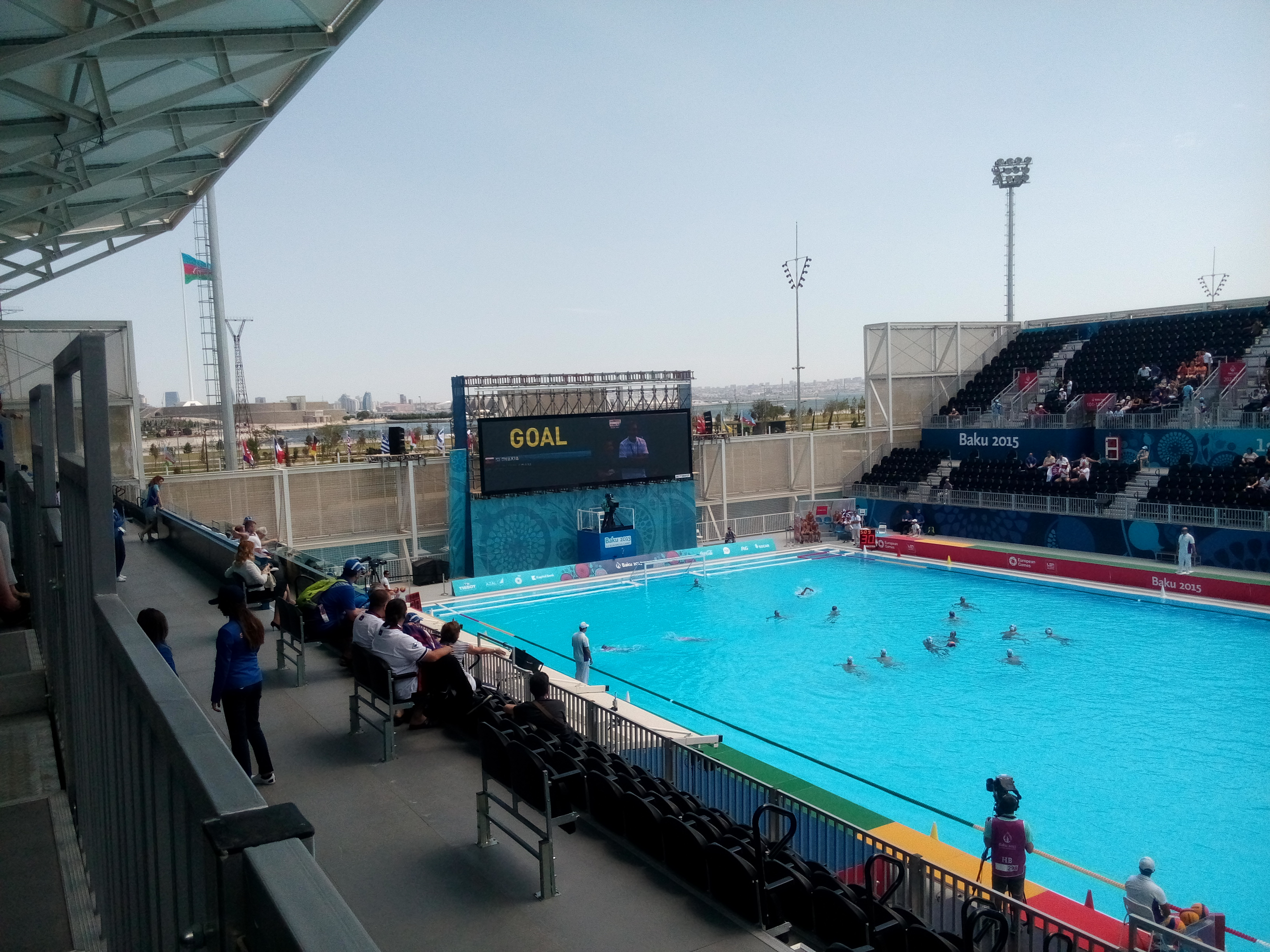
Slovak team at the 2015 European Games in the match against Serbia

=== Olympic Games ===
At the Olympic Games, the Slovak team qualified only once, in Sydney for the Summer Olympics 2000. They completed 4 qualifications, but only that qualification from Hannover in 2000 was able to fight her way to the Olympics. In the games themselves, they lost all matches and finished in last place.

=== World Championship ===
The team qualified 3 times for the World Championships. They first qualified for the 1998 World Championships in Perth, Australia, where they advanced from the preliminary to the second round and later to the 9th to 12th place fights. After 4 victories in the tournament, they took 10th place overall.

Three years later, in Fukuoka, Japan, it finished worse when it was able to score in only two matches: in the basic group with Brazil and in the match for 11th place with Kazakhstan.

At the World Championships 2003, organized by the Spanish Barcelona and where the competition system changed, the team advanced to the round of 16. Surprisingly, they went through Germany and made it his biggest success. In subsequent placement matches, it was no longer enough for USA and then for Australia to finish 8th overall.

In 2005, a European qualification took place in Italy for the World Championships 2005, where the team advanced to the semi-finals. The first 3 teams advanced to the World Cup, but after losing to Croatia and then also in the battle for 3rd place with Romania they took 4th place, first non-promotive.

=== European Championship ===
At the European Championships, the team advanced from qualification right after its establishment in 1993 to its first European Water Polo Championship, where it was won by coach Karol Schmuck 10th place. From the B tournament of the European Championships in 1994, the team did not make it to the 1995 Men's European Water Polo Championship.

2 years later, yes, and at the 1997 European Championships, after 3 wins in the basic group, they took the overall 8th place in the tournament. From 1996 to 2001, Ladislav Bottlik led the men's national team. In 1999, in Florence, Italy, under his leadership, the team did not advance from the basic group to the quarterfinals and lost to Romania by 9th place in overtime. At the 2001 European Championships in Budapest, they made it to the quarterfinals, in which she narrowly lost to Yugoslavia – the later winner of the 7: 8 championship, and finally took 8th place. In 2001, coach Ondrej Gajdáč joined the team.

In 2003, Slovakia organized one of the qualification groups on its territory, from which the team qualified for the 2003 European Championships in Kranj, Slovenia. After advancing from the basic group, after defeat in the quarterfinals with Croatia and in the match for the 5th Spain. In the match for the final 7th place, however, they defeated Greece and won its best position at the European Championships.

In 2005, Ladislav Vidumanský took over the national team, and in 2006 he managed to advance to the European Championship again. At the 2006 European Championships in Belgrade, Serbia, after a draw in the basic group with the Netherlands and the victory for the final position over Slovenia, the Slovak team took the penultimate 11th place. For the first time since 2007, the head coach was a foreign coach – 65-year-old Croatian Ante Nakič, nicknamed Mile. The Slovak team fought its way to the 2008 European Championships, which took place in Málaga, Spain, but after seven losses it took the last place.

In 2009, Roman Poláčik took over the coaching bench, who also led the national team in qualifying for the 2010 European Championships, which took place in the Turkish Istanbul, and the Slovak team failed to make it to the continental championship for the first time. After a surprising loss in the first match with the home Turkey came a close second loss to Spain and even a high victory in the third match with Malta did not help to advance from the group.

Two years later in the European Championship 2012 qualification, the team advanced from 2nd place in the group to the draw, but after two clear losses with Greece did not advance to the European Championship again. The national team was already led by a former three-time assistant national team coach Pavol Sirotný. The team, which was then led by the Spanish coach Antonio Esteller Serrahima, did not make it to its eighth European Championship until 2016. In the tournament, they lost all 3 matches in the basic group, as well as the first 2 matches in the elimination round. After the subsequent victories over Malta and Georgia, they finished 13th, guaranteeing them the last possible promotion to the World Olympic Qualifying Tournament. They did not advance to the Rio 2016 Summer Olympics in this tournament and ended up in a non-promotion 11th place. In these tournaments, the team was led by Spanish coach Antonio Esteller Serrahima.

Recently, the team qualified for the 2018 Men's European Water Polo Championship and 2020 European Championships, finishing both in 14th place. The national team coach is a former slovak water polo player Peter Nižný.

== Results ==
=== Olympic Games ===
- 2000 – 12th place

=== World Championship ===
- 1998 – 10th place
- 2001 – 11th place
- 2003 – 8th place

=== European Championship ===
- 1993 – 10th place
- 1997 – 8th place
- 1999 – 10th place
- 2001 – 8th place
- 2003 – 7th place
- 2006 – 11th place
- 2008 – 12th place
- 2016 – 13th place
- 2018 – 14th place
- 2020 – 14th place
- 2022 – 15th place
- 2024 – 13th place
- 2026 – 14th place

=== European Games ===
- 2015: 12th

== Team ==
=== Current squad ===
Roster for the 2026 Men's European Water Polo Championship.

Head coach: Roman Polačik

Name	Date of birth	Pos.	Club
Lukáš Kozmér	6 December 1993 (age 32)	GK	(France) Olympic Nice Natation
Marek Tkáč	9 March 1995 (age 31)	GK	(Germany) Spandau 04
Maroš Tkáč	13 July 1996 (age 30)	W	(Italy) Muri Antichi
Lukáš Seman	6 October 1987 (age 39)	CF	(Croatia) VK Primorje
Lukáš Ďurík	2 December 1992 (age 33)	CF	(Italy) Pro Recco
Matej Čaraj	20 September 2000 (age 26)	CF	(Germany) Spandau 04
Marco Mihal	4 February 2002 (age 24)	DF	(Hungary) One Eger
Patrik Tisaj	12 October 2002 (age 24)	DF	(France) Olympic Nice Natation
Marek Molnar	31 October 1991 (age 34)	DF	(Germany) White Sharks Hannover
Boris Juhasz	19 October 2001 (age 25)	CF	(Slovakia) ŠK Hornets Košice
Tomas Bielik	19 November 1993 (age 32)	DF	(Slovakia) KVP Nováky
Samuel Baláž (C)	5 January 1994 (age 32)	W	(France) Olympic Nice Natation
Filip Balogh	4 July 2005 (age 21)	GK	(Slovakia) CH Košice
Adam Furman	16 May 1999 (age 27)	W	(France) Team Strasbourg

=== Notable players ===
- Karol Bačo
- Lukáš Ďurík
- Martin Faměra
- Alexander Nagy
- Lukáš Seman
- Juraj Zaťovič
