= Malmsten =

Malmsten or Malmstén is a Swedish-language surname which may refer to:

- Bengt Malmsten (1922–1996), Swedish Olympic speed skater
- Birger Malmsten (1920–1991), Swedish actor
- Bodil Malmsten (1944–2016), Swedish poet and novelist
- Carl Malmsten (1888–1972), Swedish furniture designer, architect and educator
- Carl Johan Malmsten (1814–1886), Swedish mathematician
- Eugen Malmstén (1907–1993), Swedish-Finnish musician and orchestra director
- Georg Malmstén (1902–1981), Swedish-Finnish singer and musician
- Gustaf Malmsten (1889–1976), Swedish Olympic athlete
- Mait Malmsten (born 1972), Estonian actor
- Staffan Malmsten (born 1970), Swedish sprint canoer

== See also ==
- Yngwie Malmsteen
