= Andrej Franulović =

Croatian water polo referee

- Born: 1976 (age 49–50); Rijeka, Croatia
- Years active: since 2010
- Known for: water polo refereeing

Andrej Franulović (Rijeka, 1976) is a Croatian international water polo referee, who has officiated in top European and global tournaments, being currently ranked as an A+ category referee in Europe.

He started his international water polo refereeing career in 2006. He has been officiating at FINA/World Aquatics events since at least 2012, including the Perth 2012 World Youth Championships, where he officiated multiple matches.

He was selected to officiate at the 2024 Summer Olympics. Also, he officiated at the Water Polo Champions League 2024-2025. In April 2025, Franulović was named among the European referees for the men's tournament at the 2025 World Aquatics Championships in Singapore, officiating several key matches, including the Italy vs Greece quarter-final on 20 July 2025. In May–June 2025, Franulović served as one of six referees at the 2024–25 European Aquatics Champions League Final Four in Gżira, Malta.
