= Frank Ohme =

German water polo referee (born 1983)

- Born: 2 August 1983 (age 43); Thuringia
- Occupation: Water polo referee
- Years active: 2011–present

Frank Ohme (born 2 August 1983) is a German water polo referee, who has officiated at top-level international competitions, including the Tokyo 2020 Summer Olympics and the Paris 2024 Olympic Games.

== Career ==
Ohme officiated multiple matches during the Tokyo 2020 Olympics. He also took charge in World Championships and World League Super Finals, earning recognition in the British Water Polo League.

He has also officiated in FINA World Championships and World League finals in 2021. In January 25, 2026, he was the leading referee at the final game of the 2026 Men's European Water Polo Championship.

== Personal life ==
He is married and has two children. In addition, Ohme balances his refereeing career with his research work as a senior researcher - astrophysicist, and research group leader at the Albert Einstein Institute in Hannover.
