= Radoslav Filipović =

Serbian water polo player

Personal information
- Nationality: Serbian
- Born: 19 August 1997 (age 29) Novi Sad, Yugoslavia
- Height: 196 cm (77 in)

Sport
- Sport: Water polo
- Current club: Radnički Kragujevac

Senior clubs
- Years: Team
- 2024–present: Radnički Kragujevac
Medal record
Men's water polo
Representing Serbia
Olympic Games
Gold medal – first place	2024 Paris	Team
European Championship
Gold medal – first place	2026 Belgrade

Radoslav Filipović (born 19 August 1997) is a Serbian water polo player who plays for Radnički Kragujevac. He also represents the Serbia men's national water polo team internationally, with whom he won the gold medal at the 2024 Summer Olympics.
