= 1926 Men's European Water Polo Championship =

Water sport competitions

Tournament details
- Host country: Hungary
- Venue(s): 1 (in 1 host city)
- Dates: 18–22 August
- Teams: 4 (from 1 confederation)

Final positions
- Champions: Hungary (1st title)
- Runners-up: Sweden
- Third place: Germany
- Fourth place: Belgium

Tournament statistics
- Matches played: 6
- Goals scored: 44 (7.33 per match)

The 1926 Men's European Water Polo Championship was the 1st edition of the event, organised by the Europe's governing body in aquatics, the Ligue Européenne de Natation. The event took place between 18 and 22 August in Budapest, Hungary as an integrated part of the 1926 European Aquatics Championships.

== Teams ==
- Belgium
- Germany
- Hungary
- Sweden

== Main round ==
	Team	G	W	D	L	GF	GA	Diff	Points
1.	Hungary	3	3	0	0	16	3	+13	6
2.	Sweden	3	1	1	1	10	10	0	3
3.	Germany	3	1	0	2	11	17	−6	2
4.	Belgium	3	0	1	2	7	14	−7	1

- First round

18 August 1926	Hungary	8–1	Germany

- Second round

19 August 1926	Germany	6–4	Belgium

- Third round

20 August 1926	Hungary	5–0	Belgium

20 August 1926	Sweden	5–4	Germany

- Fourth round

21 August 1926	Belgium	3–3	Sweden

- Fifth round

22 August 1926	Hungary	3–2	Sweden

== Final ranking ==
RANK	TEAM
	Hungary
	Sweden
	Germany
4.	Belgium

1926 Men's European champion

Hungary
First title

István Barta, Tibor Fazekas, Márton Homonnai, Alajos Keserű, Ferenc Keserű, József Vértesy, János Wenk
