= 1999 Men's European Water Polo Championship =

The 1999 Men's European Water Polo Championship took place in Florence, Italy from September 2 to September 11, 1999. It was organised by the Ligue Européenne de Natation.

== Teams ==
GROUP A

- Croatia
- Greece
- Hungary
- Italy
- Slovakia
- Slovenia

GROUP B

- Germany
- Netherlands
- Romania
- Russia
- Spain
- Yugoslavia

== Preliminary round ==
=== GROUP A ===
	Team	Points	G	W	D	L	GF	GA	Diff
1.	Hungary	9	5	4	1	0	46	25	+21
2.	Croatia	8	5	4	0	1	40	30	+10
3.	Italy	7	5	3	1	1	35	32	+3
4.	Greece	4	5	2	0	3	32	32	0
5.	Slovakia	2	5	1	0	4	29	43	−14
6.	Slovenia	0	5	0	0	5	26	46	−20

- Thursday September 2, 1999

Greece	9–5	Slovenia
Slovakia	7–9	Croatia
Italy	7–7	Hungary

- Friday September 3, 1999

Greece	8–3	Slovakia
Slovenia	3–11	Hungary
Croatia	7–6	Italy

- Saturday September 4, 1999

Slovakia	8–7	Slovenia
Hungary	7–6	Croatia
Italy	7–6	Greece

- Sunday September 5, 1999

Slovenia	4–9	Croatia
Greece	3–8	Hungary
Slovakia	5–6	Italy

- Monday September 6, 1999

Hungary	13–6	Slovakia
Croatia	9–6	Greece
Italy	9–7	Slovenia

=== GROUP B ===
	Team	Points	G	W	D	L	GF	GA	Diff
1.	Spain	8	5	4	0	1	44	33	+11
2.	Russia	6	5	3	0	2	37	35	+2
3.	Yugoslavia	5	5	2	1	2	36	33	+3
4.	Germany	5	5	2	1	2	26	29	−3
5.	Romania	3	5	1	1	3	29	32	−3
6.	Netherlands	3	5	1	1	3	33	43	−10

- Thursday September 2, 1999

Germany	4–9	Spain
Netherlands	7–10	Russia
Romania	5–7	Yugoslavia

- Friday September 3, 1999

Romania	3–5	Germany
Yugoslavia	8–9	Russia
Spain	11–8	Netherlands

- Saturday September 4, 1999

Netherlands	4–4	Romania
Russia	4–6	Spain
Germany	3–3	Yugoslavia

- Sunday September 5, 1999

Germany	7–8	Netherlands
Romania	7–8	Russia
Yugoslavia	7–10	Spain

- Monday September 6, 1999

Netherlands	6–11	Yugoslavia
Spain	8–10	Romania
Russia	6–7	Germany

== Quarterfinals ==
- Wednesday September 8, 1999

Russia	6–7	Italy
Croatia	9 – 7 [aet]	Yugoslavia
Spain	6–7	Greece
Hungary	15–4	Germany

== Semifinals ==
- Thursday September 9, 1999 — Winners Round

Greece	7–10	Croatia
Hungary	7–5	Italy

- Thursday September 9, 1999 — Losers Round

Germany	7–8	Russia
Yugoslavia	5–8	Spain

== Finals ==
- Wednesday September 8, 1999 — Eleventh Place Match

Netherlands	7–8	Slovenia

- Wednesday September 8, 1999 — Ninth Place Match

Romania	9 – 8 [aet]	Slovakia

- Friday September 10, 1999 — Seventh Place Match

Germany	5–8	Yugoslavia

- Friday September 10, 1999 — Fifth Place Match

Russia	14–12	Spain

- Saturday September 11, 1999 — Bronze Medal Match

Italy	7–6	Greece

- Saturday September 11, 1999 — Gold Medal Match

Hungary	15–12	Croatia

== Final ranking ==
RANK	TEAM
	Hungary
	Croatia
	Italy
4.	Greece
5.	Russia
6.	Spain
7.	Yugoslavia
8.	Germany
9.	Romania
10.	Slovakia
11.	Slovenia
12.	Netherlands

1999 Men's European champion

Hungary
Twelfth title

== Individual awards ==
- Most Valuable Player
  - ???
- Best Goalkeeper
  - ???

RANK	TOPSCORERS	GOALS
1.	Salvador Gómez (ESP)	16
2.	Manuel Estiarte (ESP)	14
2.	Tamás Kásás (HUN)	14
2.	Revaz Tchomakhidze (RUS)	14
5.	Alexander Yerishev (RUS)	13
5.	Sven Reinhardt (GER)	13
7.	Georgios Afroudakis (GRE)	12
7.	Géza Gyurcsi (SVK)	12
7.	Juan Perez (ESP)	12
7.	Carlo Silipo (ITA)	12
7.	Irek Zinnourov (RUS)	12
