= 2003 Men's European Water Polo Championship =

Season 26 of Europe championship of water ball

The 2003 Men's European Water Polo Championship was the 26th edition of the event, organised by the Europe's governing body in aquatics, the Ligue Européenne de Natation. The event took place in the Aquatic Centre in Kranj, Slovenia from June 6 to June 15, 2003.

There were two qualification tournaments ahead of the event, held from April 9 to April 13, 2003 in Kyiv, Ukraine (with Belarus, Spain, Germany, Netherlands, France and Ukraine competing) and Bratislava, Slovakia (Greece, Slovakia, Romania, Poland, Malta and Turkey).

Serbia and Montenegro won their third title by defeating Croatia in the final, meanwhile Hungary beat Russia to secure the bronze medal.

After the end of final match Croatian fans started a massive riot.

== Teams ==
GROUP A

- Hungary
- Netherlands
- Romania
- Russia
- Serbia and Montenegro
- Slovakia

GROUP B

- Croatia
- Germany
- Greece
- Italy
- Slovenia
- Spain

== Preliminary round ==
=== GROUP A ===
	Team	Points	G	W	D	L	GF	GA	Diff
1.	Serbia and Montenegro	8	5	4	0	1	56	33	+23
2.	Hungary	8	5	4	0	1	46	30	+16
3.	Russia	6	5	3	0	2	44	41	+3
4.	Slovakia	4	5	2	0	3	41	51	−10
5.	Netherlands	2	5	1	0	4	37	48	−11
6.	Romania	2	5	1	0	4	28	49	−21

=== GROUP B ===
	Team	Points	G	W	D	L	GF	GA	Diff
1.	Croatia	8	5	4	0	1	38	31	+7
2.	Greece	6	5	3	0	2	34	31	+3
3.	Spain	6	5	3	0	2	37	35	+2
4.	Germany	4	5	2	0	3	39	41	−2
5.	Italy	4	5	2	0	3	33	33	0
6.	Slovenia	2	5	1	0	4	39	49	−10

== Quarterfinals ==
- Thiursday June 12, 2003

Croatia	10–6	Slovakia
Hungary	10–2	Spain
Russia	10–8	Greece
Serbia and Montenegro	9–2	Germany

== Semifinals ==
- Friday June 13, 2003

Croatia	10–9	Hungary
Serbia and Montenegro	11–7	Russia

== Finals ==
- Sunday June 15, 2003 — Bronze Medal

Hungary	12–6	Russia

- Sunday June 15, 2003 — Gold Medal

Serbia and Montenegro	9 – 8 [aet]	Croatia

== Final ranking ==
RANK	TEAM
	Serbia and Montenegro
	Croatia
	Hungary
4.	Russia
5.	Spain
6.	Germany
7.	Slovakia
8.	Greece
9.	Italy
10.	Romania
11.	Netherlands
12.	Slovenia

2003 Men's European champion

Serbia and Montenegro
Third title

== Individual awards ==
- Most Valuable Player
  - Alexander Yeryshov (RUS)

- Best Goalkeeper
  - Denis Šefik (SCG)

- Topscorer
  - Aleksandar Šapić (SCG)— 24 goals
