= Israel men's national water polo team =

Men's national water polo team representing Israel

Israel
- FINA code: ISR
- Association: Israel Swimming Association
- Confederation: LEN (Europe)
- Head coach: Tal Grodman
- Asst coach: Rotem Zukerman
- Captain: Ido Goldschmidt
- Home venue: Wingate Institute

World Championship
- Appearances: 3 (first in 1973)
- Best result: 15th (1986)

European Championship
- Appearances: 3 (first in 2022)
- Best result: 12th (2022)

The Israel men's national water polo team is the representative for Israel in international men's water polo.

== Results ==
=== World Championship ===
- 1973 – 16th place
- 1978 – 16th place
- 1986 – 15th place

=== European Championship ===
- 2022 – 12th place
- 2024 – 16th place
- 2026 – 16th place

== Current squad ==
Squad for the 2026 Men's European Water Polo Championship.

Head coach: Tal Grodman

Name	Date of birth	Pos.	Club
Yahav Fire	14 July 1997 (age 28)	GK	(Israel) Hapoel Palram Zvulun
Or Schlein	21 May 2002 (age 23)	W	(Australia) Drummoyne
Ronen Gros	8 December 1991 (age 34)	W	(Israel) Hapoel Palram Zvulun
Gil Natan Gvishi	28 July 2003 (age 22)	W	(Italy) Chiavari Nuoto
Tomer Arazi	13 November 2006 (age 19)	CF	(Israel) Givat Haim
Amir Shafrir	2 February 2006 (age 20)	DF	(Israel) Hapoel Palram Zvulun
Vlad Begin	6 May 1998 (age 27)	DF	(Israel) Gush Zvulun
Ido Goldschmidt (C)	28 December 1993 (age 32)	W	(Israel) Hapoel Palram Zvulun
Itai Roth	11 April 2001 (age 24)	W	(United States) Long Beach State University
Yoav Rendler	5 February 2002 (age 24)	W	(United States) University Of The Pacific
Ori Buzaglo	4 February 2003 (age 23)	CF	(United States) University Of The Pacific
Yuval Klarfeld	12 September 1999 (age 26)	W	(Israel) Hapoel Palram Zvulun
Maxim Smirnov	23 March 2003 (age 22)	GK	(United States) Pepperdine University
Nadav Carnon	5 July 2003 (age 22)	DF	(United States) Wagner College
Raz Segere Sharir	17 April 2006 (age 19)	W	(Israel) Hapoel Givat Haim
