= Slovenia men's national water polo team =

Men's national water polo team representing Slovenia

Slovenia
- FINA code: SLO
- Association: Federation of Water polo clubs Slovenia
- Confederation: LEN (Europe)
- Head coach: Mirko Vičević
- Asst coach: Teo Galić

European Championship
- Appearances: 6 (first in 1999)
- Best result: 11th place (1999)

Slovenia men's national water polo team represents Slovenia in international water polo competitions and friendly matches, and is governed by the Federation of Water polo clubs Slovenia.

The team has participated in the European Water Polo Championship six times. Their highest ranking is 11th place, achieved in their first appearance in 1999.

== Competitive record ==
=== European Championship record ===
- 1999 – 11th place
- 2003 – 12th place
- 2006 – 12th place
- 2022 – 16th place
- 2024 – 14th place
- 2026 – 15th place

=== Mediterranean Games ===
- 2022 – 6th place
- 2026 – 8th place

== Current squad ==
Squad for the 2026 Men's European Water Polo Championship.

Head coach: (Montenegro) Mirko Vičević

No.	Name	Date of birth (age)	Pos.	Club
1	Jure Beton	23 April 1997 (age 29)	GK	(Slovenia) VK Ljubljana Slovan
2	Vukasin Stefanović	11 October 2002 (age 24)	W	(Germany) ASC Duisburg
3	Jaša Kadivec (C)	13 November 1993 (age 32)	CF	(Slovenia) AVK Triglav Kranj
4	Matija Bernard Čanč	27 December 2004 (age 21)	CF	(Slovenia) VK Ljubljana Slovan
5	Miha Šantak	7 April 2006 (age 20)	DF	(Slovenia) AVK Branik Maribor
6	Marcel Lipnik	5 April 2008 (age 18)	W	(Slovenia) VK Ljubljana Slovan
7	Nace Štromajer	3 December 2007 (age 18)	W	(Spain) CN Sabadell
8	Aleksander Paunović	25 February 2004 (age 22)	DF	(Slovenia) AVK Triglav Kranj
9	Gašper Fičur	30 January 2004 (age 22)	CF	(Slovenia) VD Koper 1958
10	Aleksander Cerar	3 January 2004 (age 22)	DF	(Slovenia) AVK Triglav Kranj
11	Aljaž Troppan	17 May 2002 (age 24)	CF	(Slovenia) AVK Triglav Kranj
12	Enej Potočnik	1 August 2003 (age 23)	DF	(Slovenia) VK Ljubljana Slovan
13	Milan Bulajić	4 May 2000 (age 26)	GK	(Serbia) VK Zemun
14	Nikola Miletić	24 December 2005 (age 20)	W	(Slovenia) AVK Branik Maribor
15	Bine Štromajer	7 January 2010 (age 16)	W	(Spain) CN Sabadell
