= 2020 Men's European Water Polo Championship Qualifiers =

The 2020 Men's European Water Polo Championship Qualifiers are a series of tournaments aimed to establish the participants of the 2020 Men's European Water Polo Championship. The matches were played from 11 to 13 October 2019.

== Pools composition ==
The draw of the pools was held on 8 June 2019. The city selected as host were Tbilisi (Georgia), Nováky (Slovakia), Valletta (Malta) and Utrecht (Netherlands). The best two teams of each group qualified for the European Championship main round.

Group A	Group B	Group C	Group D
Georgia (H)	Belarus	Malta (H)	Lithuania
Germany	France	Portugal	Netherlands (H)
Switzerland	Slovakia (H)	Romania	Turkey
	Ukraine		

== Group A ==
Team	Pts	Pld	W	D	L	GF	GA	GD
Georgia	6	2	2	0	0	33	14	+19
Germany	3	2	1	0	1	25	16	+9
Switzerland	0	2	0	0	2	14	42	-28

11 October 2019; 19:30	Report	Switzerland	7–18	Germany	Olympic Pool (Tbilisi); Referees: Siarou (BLR), Zwart (NED)
11 October 2019; 19:30	Report	Score by quarters: 0–4, 2–3, 1–4, 4–7			Olympic Pool (Tbilisi); Referees: Siarou (BLR), Zwart (NED)
11 October 2019; 19:30	Report	3: Pleyer; J. Herzog	Goals	3: Korbel, Preuss, Restović, Zech	Olympic Pool (Tbilisi); Referees: Siarou (BLR), Zwart (NED)

12 October 2019; 19:30	Report	Georgia	9–7	Germany	Olympic Pool (Tbilisi); Referees: Siarou (BLR), Balanescu (ROU)
12 October 2019; 19:30	Report	Score by quarters: 5–2, 0–1, 1–2, 3–2			Olympic Pool (Tbilisi); Referees: Siarou (BLR), Balanescu (ROU)
12 October 2019; 19:30	Report	2: Tsrepulia, Bitadze. Jakhaia, Adeishvili	Goals	2: Real, Jüngling, Restović	Olympic Pool (Tbilisi); Referees: Siarou (BLR), Balanescu (ROU)

13 October 2019; 11:00	Report	Georgia	24–7	Switzerland	Olympic Pool (Tbilisi); Referees: Zwart (NED), Balanescu (ROU)
13 October 2019; 11:00	Report	Score by quarters: 6–1, 6–0, 6–4, 6–2			Olympic Pool (Tbilisi); Referees: Zwart (NED), Balanescu (ROU)
13 October 2019; 11:00	Report	7: Shushiashvili; 3: Bitadze, Jelaca, Adeishvili	Goals	3: Pleyer; 2: P. Herzog	Olympic Pool (Tbilisi); Referees: Zwart (NED), Balanescu (ROU)

== Group B ==
Team	Pts	Pld	W	D	L	GF	GA	GD
Slovakia	9	3	3	0	0	44	15	+29
France	6	3	2	0	1	47	20	+27
Belarus	3	3	1	0	2	20	48	-28
Ukraine	0	3	0	0	3	17	46	-29

11 October 2019; 17:30	Report	France	20–5	Ukraine	Národné centrum vodného póla (Nováky); Referees: Häntschel (GER), Berishvili (GEO)
11 October 2019; 17:30	Report	Score by quarters: 3–2, 7–2, 5–1, 5–0			Národné centrum vodného póla (Nováky); Referees: Häntschel (GER), Berishvili (GEO)
11 October 2019; 17:30	Report	5: Marzouki; 4: Vernoux	Goals	2: Dyadyura	Národné centrum vodného póla (Nováky); Referees: Häntschel (GER), Berishvili (GEO)

11 October 2019; 19:00	Report	Slovakia	19–4	Belarus	Národné centrum vodného póla (Nováky); Referees: Balzan (MLT), Uz (TUR)
11 October 2019; 19:00	Report	Score by quarters: 4–0, 7–0, 4–1, 4–3			Národné centrum vodného póla (Nováky); Referees: Balzan (MLT), Uz (TUR)
11 October 2019; 19:00	Report	3: Čaraj, Molnár, Kolárik; 2: Marek Tkáč, Baláž	Goals	1: Khrypakou, Radzko, Padziarun, Kuzmenko	Národné centrum vodného póla (Nováky); Referees: Balzan (MLT), Uz (TUR)

12 October 2019; 17:00	Report	Belarus	6–22	France	Národné centrum vodného póla (Nováky); Referees: Häntschl (GER), Uz (TUR)
12 October 2019; 17:00	Report	Score by quarters: 2–7, 2–6, 1–3, 1–6			Národné centrum vodného póla (Nováky); Referees: Häntschl (GER), Uz (TUR)
12 October 2019; 17:00	Report	3: Shalamitski, 2: Dzikhtsiarienka	Goals	5: Marion-Vernoux; Bachelier, Cannone, Camarasa	Národné centrum vodného póla (Nováky); Referees: Häntschl (GER), Uz (TUR)

12 October 2019; 18:30	Report	Slovakia	16–5	Ukraine	Národné centrum vodného póla (Nováky); Referees: Balzan (MLT), Berishvili (GEO)
12 October 2019; 18:30	Report	Score by quarters: 3–0, 5–3, 2–1, 6–1			Národné centrum vodného póla (Nováky); Referees: Balzan (MLT), Berishvili (GEO)
12 October 2019; 18:30	Report	4: Baláž; 3: Marek Tkáč	Goals	2: Kryvolapov, Dyadyura	Národné centrum vodného póla (Nováky); Referees: Balzan (MLT), Berishvili (GEO)

13 October 2019; 10:00	Report	Ukraine	7–10	Belarus	Národné centrum vodného póla (Nováky); Referees: Balzan (MLT), Häntschel (GER)
13 October 2019; 10:00	Report	Score by quarters: 1–4, 2–1, 4–3, 0–2			Národné centrum vodného póla (Nováky); Referees: Balzan (MLT), Häntschel (GER)
13 October 2019; 10:00	Report	3: Dyadyura; 2: Yuriy Memetyev	Goals	3: Velichka; 2: Shalamitski	Národné centrum vodného póla (Nováky); Referees: Balzan (MLT), Häntschel (GER)

13 October 2019; 11:30	Report	Slovakia	9–5	France	Národné centrum vodného póla (Nováky); Referees: Berishvili (GEO), Uz (TUR)
13 October 2019; 11:30	Report	Score by quarters: 3–2, 2–3, 3–0, 1–1			Národné centrum vodného póla (Nováky); Referees: Berishvili (GEO), Uz (TUR)
13 October 2019; 11:30	Report	3: Maroš Tkáč; 2: Čaraj	Goals	2: Kalinić, Marzouki	Národné centrum vodného póla (Nováky); Referees: Berishvili (GEO), Uz (TUR)

== Group C ==
Team	Pts	Pld	W	D	L	GF	GA	GD
Romania	6	2	2	0	0	28	14	+14
Malta	3	2	1	0	1	19	23	-4
Portugal	0	2	0	0	2	17	27	-10

11 October 2019; 17:30	Report	Romania	15–7	Portugal	National Swimming Pool (Valletta); Referees: Papaurelis (LTU), Garcia (SUI)
11 October 2019; 17:30	Report	Score by quarters: 4–1, 2–2, 3–2, 6–2			National Swimming Pool (Valletta); Referees: Papaurelis (LTU), Garcia (SUI)
11 October 2019; 17:30	Report	5: Negrean; 3: Gheorghe	Goals	3: Moreira; 2: Sousa	National Swimming Pool (Valletta); Referees: Papaurelis (LTU), Garcia (SUI)

12 October 2019; 17:30	Report	Malta	12–10	Portugal	National Swimming Pool (Valletta); Referees: Dervieux (FRA), Papaurelis (LTU)
12 October 2019; 17:30	Report	Score by quarters: 6–4, 3–1, 3–4, 0–'1			National Swimming Pool (Valletta); Referees: Dervieux (FRA), Papaurelis (LTU)
12 October 2019; 17:30	Report	5: S. Camileri; 2: M. Zammit, Cousin, D. Zammit	Goals	4: Sousa; Ramos	National Swimming Pool (Valletta); Referees: Dervieux (FRA), Papaurelis (LTU)

13 October 2019; 10:00	Report	Malta	7–13	Romania	National Swimming Pool (Valletta); Referees: Dervieux (FRA), Garcia (SUI)
13 October 2019; 10:00	Report	Score by quarters: 2–3, 2–3, 2–4, 1–3			National Swimming Pool (Valletta); Referees: Dervieux (FRA), Garcia (SUI)
13 October 2019; 10:00	Report	3: S. Camileri; 2: M. Zammit	Goals	4: Gheorghe; 3: Negrean	National Swimming Pool (Valletta); Referees: Dervieux (FRA), Garcia (SUI)

== Group D ==
Team	Pts	Pld	W	D	L	GF	GA	GD
Turkey	4	2	1	1	0	32	15	+17
Netherlands	4	2	1	1	0	29	12	+17
Lithuania	0	2	0	0	2	11	45	-24

11 October 2019; 19:30	Report	Netherlands	21–4	Lithuania	Zwembad De Krommerijn (Utrecht); Referees: Santos (POR), Byelyevtsov (UKR)
11 October 2019; 19:30	Report	Score by quarters: 6–2, 3–0, 8–2, 4–0			Zwembad De Krommerijn (Utrecht); Referees: Santos (POR), Byelyevtsov (UKR)
11 October 2019; 19:30	Report	3: Lindhout, Gottemaker; 2: seven players	Goals	2: Goštautas	Zwembad De Krommerijn (Utrecht); Referees: Santos (POR), Byelyevtsov (UKR)

12 October 2019; 19:30	Report	Turkey	24–7	Lithuania	Zwembad De Krommerijn (Utrecht); Referees: Horvath (SVK), Santos (POR)
12 October 2019; 19:30	Report	Score by quarters: 8–4, 7–2, 5–1, 4–0			Zwembad De Krommerijn (Utrecht); Referees: Horvath (SVK), Santos (POR)
12 October 2019; 19:30	Report	5: Bıyık; 4: Ozbek	Goals	2: Vadvilavičius, Jonkus, Bakulo	Zwembad De Krommerijn (Utrecht); Referees: Horvath (SVK), Santos (POR)

13 October 2019; 12:30	Report	Netherlands	8–8	Turkey	Zwembad De Krommerijn (Utrecht); Referees: Horvath (SVK), Byelyevtsov (UKR)
13 October 2019; 12:30	Report	Score by quarters: 3–1, 2–2, 2–2, 1–3			Zwembad De Krommerijn (Utrecht); Referees: Horvath (SVK), Byelyevtsov (UKR)
13 October 2019; 12:30	Report	2: van Ijperen	Goals	3: Bıyık; 2: Kahraman	Zwembad De Krommerijn (Utrecht); Referees: Horvath (SVK), Byelyevtsov (UKR)

== Qualified teams ==
- Georgia
- Germany
- Slovakia
- France
- Romania
- Malta
- Turkey
- Netherlands

Teams already qualified through the 2018 European Championship:

- Hungary – Host nation
- Serbia – Winners of the 2018 European Championship
- Spain – Runners-up of the 2018 European Championship
- Croatia – 3rd place at the 2018 European Championship
- Italy – 4th place at the 2018 European Championship
- Greece – 5th place at the 2018 European Championship
- Montenegro – 6th place at the 2018 European Championship
- Russia – 7th place at the 2018 European Championship

== See also ==
- 2020 Women's European Water Polo Championship Qualifiers
