= 2022 Men's European Water Polo Championship =

Tournament details
- Host country: Croatia
- Venue: 1 (in 1 host city)
- Dates: 29 August – 10 September
- Teams: 16 (from 1 confederation)

Final positions
- Champions: Croatia (2nd title)
- Runners-up: Hungary
- Third place: Spain
- Fourth place: Italy

Tournament statistics
- Matches played: 48
- Goals scored: 1,032 (21.5 per match)
- Top scorers: (Romania) Tudor Fulea (19 goals)

Awards
- Best player: (Hungary) Szilárd Jansik

The 2022 Men's European Water Polo Championship was the 35th running of the tournament. It was held in the Spaladium Arena in Split, Croatia from 29 August to 10 September 2022.

Croatia won their second title by defeating Hungary in the final, meanwhile Spain beat Italy to secure the bronze medal.

== Venues ==
LEN announced on 28 August 2020 that Split, Croatia would host the 2022 edition of the competition. All games will be played at the Spaladium Arena.

| Split | 2022 Men's European Water Polo Championship (Europe) |
| Spaladium Arena | 2022 Men's European Water Polo Championship (Europe) |
| Capacity: 9,000 | 2022 Men's European Water Polo Championship (Europe) |
| Spaladium Arena 1 | 2022 Men's European Water Polo Championship (Europe) |

== Qualification ==
Sixteen teams were able to compete at the main event. They are broken up as follows:

- The host nation
- The top seven teams from the 2020 European Championship not already qualified as host nation
- Final eight from the qualifiers.

| Event | Date | Location | Quotas | Nation(s) |
|---|---|---|---|---|
| Host | 28 August 2020 | – | 1 | Croatia |
| 2020 European Championship | 14–26 January 2020 | (Hungary) Budapest | 6 | Greece; Hungary; Italy; Montenegro; ~~Russia~~; Serbia; Spain |
| Qualifiers | 17–20 February 2022 | Various | 8 | France; Georgia; Germany; Israel; Malta; Netherlands; Romania; Slovakia |
| Wild card | 10 April 2022 | | 1 | Slovenia |

Russia was excluded due to the 2022 Russian invasion of Ukraine.

== Format ==
The sixteen teams were split in four groups with four teams each. From there on, a knockout system was used. The first classified team of each group directly qualified for the quarterfinals, the second and third teams played each other in cross group format to qualify for the quarterfinals.

== Draw ==
The draw was held in Budapest on 23 April 2022.

| Pot 1 | Pot 2 | Pot 3 | Pot 4 |
|---|---|---|---|
| Hungary; Spain; Montenegro; Croatia | Serbia; Italy; Greece | France; Georgia; Romania; Netherlands | Germany; Slovakia; Malta; Israel; Slovenia |

== Preliminary round ==
All times are local (UTC+2).

=== Group A ===
| Pos | Team | Pld | W | D | L | GF | GA | GD | Pts | Qualification |
|---|---|---|---|---|---|---|---|---|---|---|
| 1 | Italy | 3 | 3 | 0 | 0 | 52 | 25 | +27 | 9 | Quarterfinals |
| 2 | Montenegro | 3 | 2 | 0 | 1 | 40 | 34 | +6 | 6 | Playoffs |
| 3 | Georgia | 3 | 1 | 0 | 2 | 35 | 43 | −8 | 3 | Playoffs |
| 4 | Slovakia | 3 | 0 | 0 | 3 | 30 | 55 | −25 | 0 | 13th place classification |

Source: Split2022
Rules for classification: 1) points; 2) head-to-head points; 3) head-to-head goal difference; 4) head-to-head number of goals scored; 5) Goal difference.

| 29 August 2022; 10:30 | Report | Georgia | 11–14 | Montenegro | Spaladium Arena, Split; Referees: Boris Margeta (SLO), Tamás Kovács (HUN) |
| 29 August 2022; 10:30 | Report | Score by quarters: 3–5, 2–4, 3–4, 3–1 | | | Spaladium Arena, Split; Referees: Boris Margeta (SLO), Tamás Kovács (HUN) |
| 29 August 2022; 10:30 | Report | Jelaca 5 | Goals | Averka 4 | Spaladium Arena, Split; Referees: Boris Margeta (SLO), Tamás Kovács (HUN) |

| 29 August 2022; 15:30 | Report | Italy | 21–9 | Slovakia | Spaladium Arena, Split; Referees: Matan Schwartz (ISR), Peter Balzan (MLT) |
| 29 August 2022; 15:30 | Report | Score by quarters: 6–3, 6–2, 4–2, 5–2 | | | Spaladium Arena, Split; Referees: Matan Schwartz (ISR), Peter Balzan (MLT) |
| 29 August 2022; 15:30 | Report | Di Somma 5 | Goals | Čaraj 3 | Spaladium Arena, Split; Referees: Matan Schwartz (ISR), Peter Balzan (MLT) |

| 31 August 2022; 14:00 | Report | Montenegro | 18–10 | Slovakia | Spaladium Arena, Split; Referees: Nenad Periš (CRO), Peter Balzan (MLT) |
| 31 August 2022; 14:00 | Report | Score by quarters: 4–1, 5–6, 6–1, 3–2 | | | Spaladium Arena, Split; Referees: Nenad Periš (CRO), Peter Balzan (MLT) |
| 31 August 2022; 14:00 | Report | Averka 5 | Goals | Seman 3 | Spaladium Arena, Split; Referees: Nenad Periš (CRO), Peter Balzan (MLT) |

| 31 August 2022; 17:00 | Report | Italy | 18–8 | Georgia | Spaladium Arena, Split; Referees: Tamás Kovács (HUN), Sébastien Dervieux (FRA) |
| 31 August 2022; 17:00 | Report | Score by quarters: 4–1, 5–2, 6–4, 3–1 | | | Spaladium Arena, Split; Referees: Tamás Kovács (HUN), Sébastien Dervieux (FRA) |
| 31 August 2022; 17:00 | Report | Alesiani 4 | Goals | Saric, Vapenski 2 | Spaladium Arena, Split; Referees: Tamás Kovács (HUN), Sébastien Dervieux (FRA) |

| 2 September 2022; 10:30 | Report | Georgia | 16–11 | Slovakia | Spaladium Arena, Split; Referees: Vojin Putniković (SRB), Michiel Zwart (NED) |
| 2 September 2022; 10:30 | Report | Score by quarters: 5–1, 4–3, 4–3, 3–4 | | | Spaladium Arena, Split; Referees: Vojin Putniković (SRB), Michiel Zwart (NED) |
| 2 September 2022; 10:30 | Report | Vasic 4 | Goals | four players 2 | Spaladium Arena, Split; Referees: Vojin Putniković (SRB), Michiel Zwart (NED) |

| 2 September 2022; 19:00 | Report | Italy | 13–8 | Montenegro | Spaladium Arena, Split; Referees: Tamás Kovács (HUN), Frank Ohme (GER) |
| 2 September 2022; 19:00 | Report | Score by quarters: 1–0, 3–3, 6–2, 3–3 | | | Spaladium Arena, Split; Referees: Tamás Kovács (HUN), Frank Ohme (GER) |
| 2 September 2022; 19:00 | Report | Cannella, Dolce 3 | Goals | Đurđić, Radović 2 | Spaladium Arena, Split; Referees: Tamás Kovács (HUN), Frank Ohme (GER) |

=== Group B ===
| Pos | Team | Pld | W | D | L | GF | GA | GD | Pts | Qualification |
|---|---|---|---|---|---|---|---|---|---|---|
| 1 | Croatia (H) | 3 | 2 | 1 | 0 | 37 | 17 | +20 | 7 | Quarterfinals |
| 2 | Greece | 3 | 1 | 2 | 0 | 42 | 23 | +19 | 5 | Playoffs |
| 3 | France | 3 | 1 | 1 | 1 | 34 | 33 | +1 | 4 | Playoffs |
| 4 | Malta | 3 | 0 | 0 | 3 | 19 | 59 | −40 | 0 | 13th place classification |

Source: Split2022
Rules for classification: 1) points; 2) head-to-head points; 3) head-to-head goal difference; 4) head-to-head number of goals scored; 5) Goal difference.
(H) Hosts

| 29 August 2022; 19:00 | Report | Greece | 12–12 | France | Spaladium Arena, Split; Referees: Filippo Gomez (ITA), Jaume Teixidó (ESP) |
| 29 August 2022; 19:00 | Report | Score by quarters: 3–3, 4–5, 4–2, 1–2 | | | Spaladium Arena, Split; Referees: Filippo Gomez (ITA), Jaume Teixidó (ESP) |
| 29 August 2022; 19:00 | Report | four players 2 | Goals | Crousillat, Vernoux 3 | Spaladium Arena, Split; Referees: Filippo Gomez (ITA), Jaume Teixidó (ESP) |

| 29 August 2022; 21:00 | Report | Malta | 5–19 | Croatia | Spaladium Arena, Split; Referees: Stanko Ivanovski (MNE), Erkan Turkkan (TUR) |
| 29 August 2022; 21:00 | Report | Score by quarters: 0–2, 1–3, 2–7, 2–7 | | | Spaladium Arena, Split; Referees: Stanko Ivanovski (MNE), Erkan Turkkan (TUR) |
| 29 August 2022; 21:00 | Report | M. Zammit 3 | Goals | Fatović 5 | Spaladium Arena, Split; Referees: Stanko Ivanovski (MNE), Erkan Turkkan (TUR) |

| 31 August 2022; 10:30 | Report | Greece | 25–6 | Malta | Spaladium Arena, Split; Referees: Radosław Koryzna (POL), Robert Horváth (SVK) |
| 31 August 2022; 10:30 | Report | Score by quarters: 8–1, 6–2, 4–1, 7–2 | | | Spaladium Arena, Split; Referees: Radosław Koryzna (POL), Robert Horváth (SVK) |
| 31 August 2022; 10:30 | Report | Argyropoulos 7 | Goals | M. Zammit 3 | Spaladium Arena, Split; Referees: Radosław Koryzna (POL), Robert Horváth (SVK) |

| 31 August 2022; 20:30 | Report | Croatia | 13–7 | France | Spaladium Arena, Split; Referees: Adrian Alexandrescu (ROU), Jaume Teixidó (ESP) |
| 31 August 2022; 20:30 | Report | Score by quarters: 2–3, 2–1, 5–1, 4–2 | | | Spaladium Arena, Split; Referees: Adrian Alexandrescu (ROU), Jaume Teixidó (ESP) |
| 31 August 2022; 20:30 | Report | Bukic 3 | Goals | Bouet, Crousillat 2 | Spaladium Arena, Split; Referees: Adrian Alexandrescu (ROU), Jaume Teixidó (ESP) |

| 2 September 2022; 15:30 | Report | Malta | 8–15 | France | Spaladium Arena, Split; Referees: Nora Debreceni (HUN), Robert Horváth (SVK) |
| 2 September 2022; 15:30 | Report | Score by quarters: 1–1, 2–4, 4–3, 1–7 | | | Spaladium Arena, Split; Referees: Nora Debreceni (HUN), Robert Horváth (SVK) |
| 2 September 2022; 15:30 | Report | three players 2 | Goals | Marion-Vernoux 3 | Spaladium Arena, Split; Referees: Nora Debreceni (HUN), Robert Horváth (SVK) |

| 2 September 2022; 20:30 | Report | Greece | 5–5 | Croatia | Spaladium Arena, Split; Referees: Jaume Teixidó (ESP), Filippo Gomez (ITA) |
| 2 September 2022; 20:30 | Report | Score by quarters: 2–0, 0–0, 1–3, 2–2 | | | Spaladium Arena, Split; Referees: Jaume Teixidó (ESP), Filippo Gomez (ITA) |
| 2 September 2022; 20:30 | Report | Papanastasiou, Vlachopoulos 2 | Goals | five players 1 | Spaladium Arena, Split; Referees: Jaume Teixidó (ESP), Filippo Gomez (ITA) |

=== Group C ===
| Pos | Team | Pld | W | D | L | GF | GA | GD | Pts | Qualification |
|---|---|---|---|---|---|---|---|---|---|---|
| 1 | Spain | 3 | 3 | 0 | 0 | 44 | 25 | +19 | 9 | Quarterfinals |
| 2 | Netherlands | 3 | 1 | 1 | 1 | 35 | 29 | +6 | 4 | Playoffs |
| 3 | Romania | 3 | 1 | 1 | 1 | 32 | 32 | 0 | 4 | Playoffs |
| 4 | Germany | 3 | 0 | 0 | 3 | 16 | 41 | −25 | 0 | 13th place classification |

Source: Split2022
Rules for classification: 1) points; 2) head-to-head points; 3) head-to-head goal difference; 4) head-to-head number of goals scored; 5) Goal difference.

| 29 August 2022; 09:00 | Report | Romania | 9–16 | Spain | Spaladium Arena, Split; Referees: Vojin Putniković (SRB), Radosław Koryzna (POL) |
| 29 August 2022; 09:00 | Report | Score by quarters: 1–4, 2–4, 4–5, 2–3 | | | Spaladium Arena, Split; Referees: Vojin Putniković (SRB), Radosław Koryzna (POL) |
| 29 August 2022; 09:00 | Report | three players 2 | Goals | Granados 5 | Spaladium Arena, Split; Referees: Vojin Putniković (SRB), Radosław Koryzna (POL) |

| 29 August 2022; 17:00 | Report | Germany | 6–13 | Netherlands | Spaladium Arena, Split; Referees: Nenad Periš (CRO), Georgios Stavridis (GRE) |
| 29 August 2022; 17:00 | Report | Score by quarters: 1–3, 1–2, 2–4, 2–4 | | | Spaladium Arena, Split; Referees: Nenad Periš (CRO), Georgios Stavridis (GRE) |
| 29 August 2022; 17:00 | Report | Bozic, Strelezkij 2 | Goals | Koopman, Te Riele 3 | Spaladium Arena, Split; Referees: Nenad Periš (CRO), Georgios Stavridis (GRE) |

| 31 August 2022; 12:00 | Report | Netherlands | 10–11 | Spain | Spaladium Arena, Split; Referees: Matan Schwartz (ISR), Stanko Ivanovski (MNE) |
| 31 August 2022; 12:00 | Report | Score by quarters: 3–3, 0–4, 4–2, 3–2 | | | Spaladium Arena, Split; Referees: Matan Schwartz (ISR), Stanko Ivanovski (MNE) |
| 31 August 2022; 12:00 | Report | Gielen 3 | Goals | Perrone 3 | Spaladium Arena, Split; Referees: Matan Schwartz (ISR), Stanko Ivanovski (MNE) |

| 31 August 2022; 15:30 | Report | Romania | 11–4 | Germany | Spaladium Arena, Split; Referees: Georgios Stavridis (GRE), Vojin Putniković (SRB) |
| 31 August 2022; 15:30 | Report | Score by quarters: 2–2, 3–1, 3–0, 3–1 | | | Spaladium Arena, Split; Referees: Georgios Stavridis (GRE), Vojin Putniković (SRB) |
| 31 August 2022; 15:30 | Report | Fulea 5 | Goals | Ćuk 2 | Spaladium Arena, Split; Referees: Georgios Stavridis (GRE), Vojin Putniković (SRB) |

| 2 September 2022; 14:00 | Report | Germany | 6–17 | Spain | Spaladium Arena, Split; Referees: Sebastien Dervieux (FRA), Matan Schwartz (ISR) |
| 2 September 2022; 14:00 | Report | Score by quarters: 1–5, 1–7, 4–3, 0–2 | | | Spaladium Arena, Split; Referees: Sebastien Dervieux (FRA), Matan Schwartz (ISR) |
| 2 September 2022; 14:00 | Report | Stamm 2 | Goals | Tahull 4 | Spaladium Arena, Split; Referees: Sebastien Dervieux (FRA), Matan Schwartz (ISR) |

| 2 September 2022; 17:00 | Report | Romania | 12–12 | Netherlands | Spaladium Arena, Split; Referees: Nenad Periš (CRO), Radoslaw Koryzna (POL) |
| 2 September 2022; 17:00 | Report | Score by quarters: 3–3, 2–3, 3–4, 4–2 | | | Spaladium Arena, Split; Referees: Nenad Periš (CRO), Radoslaw Koryzna (POL) |
| 2 September 2022; 17:00 | Report | Fulea 6 | Goals | Janssen 3 | Spaladium Arena, Split; Referees: Nenad Periš (CRO), Radoslaw Koryzna (POL) |

=== Group D ===
| Pos | Team | Pld | W | D | L | GF | GA | GD | Pts | Qualification |
|---|---|---|---|---|---|---|---|---|---|---|
| 1 | Hungary | 3 | 3 | 0 | 0 | 62 | 18 | +44 | 9 | Quarterfinals |
| 2 | Serbia | 3 | 2 | 0 | 1 | 42 | 25 | +17 | 6 | Playoffs |
| 3 | Israel | 3 | 1 | 0 | 2 | 16 | 46 | −30 | 3 | Playoffs |
| 4 | Slovenia | 3 | 0 | 0 | 3 | 18 | 49 | −31 | 0 | 13th place classification |

Source: Split2022
Rules for classification: 1) points; 2) head-to-head points; 3) head-to-head goal difference; 4) head-to-head number of goals scored; 5) Goal difference.

| 29 August 2022; 12:00 | Report | Serbia | 18–3 | Israel | Spaladium Arena, Split; Referees: Michiel Zwart (NED), Irakli Sanadze (GEO) |
| 29 August 2022; 12:00 | Report | Score by quarters: 3–0, 8–1, 3–1, 4–1 | | | Spaladium Arena, Split; Referees: Michiel Zwart (NED), Irakli Sanadze (GEO) |
| 29 August 2022; 12:00 | Report | Drašović, Radulović 4 | Goals | three players 1 | Spaladium Arena, Split; Referees: Michiel Zwart (NED), Irakli Sanadze (GEO) |

| 29 August 2022; 14:00 | Report | Hungary | 23–7 | Slovenia | Spaladium Arena, Split; Referees: Sébastien Dervieux (FRA), Robert Horváth (SVK) |
| 29 August 2022; 14:00 | Report | Score by quarters: 4–3, 6–2, 6–0, 7–2 | | | Spaladium Arena, Split; Referees: Sébastien Dervieux (FRA), Robert Horváth (SVK) |
| 29 August 2022; 14:00 | Report | Zalánki 4 | Goals | Popovič 3 | Spaladium Arena, Split; Referees: Sébastien Dervieux (FRA), Robert Horváth (SVK) |

| 31 August 2022; 09:00 | Report | Slovenia | 5–9 | Israel | Spaladium Arena, Split; Referees: Filippo Gomez (ITA), Frank Ohme (GER) |
| 31 August 2022; 09:00 | Report | Score by quarters: 2–4, 0–0, 2–2, 1–3 | | | Spaladium Arena, Split; Referees: Filippo Gomez (ITA), Frank Ohme (GER) |
| 31 August 2022; 09:00 | Report | five players 1 | Goals | Gros 3 | Spaladium Arena, Split; Referees: Filippo Gomez (ITA), Frank Ohme (GER) |

| 31 August 2022; 19:00 | Report | Serbia | 7–16 | Hungary | Spaladium Arena, Split; Referees: Boris Margeta (SLO), Michiel Zwart (NED) |
| 31 August 2022; 19:00 | Report | Score by quarters: 2–3, 0–4, 2–4, 3–5 | | | Spaladium Arena, Split; Referees: Boris Margeta (SLO), Michiel Zwart (NED) |
| 31 August 2022; 19:00 | Report | Drašović, S. Rašović 2 | Goals | Manhercz 4 | Spaladium Arena, Split; Referees: Boris Margeta (SLO), Michiel Zwart (NED) |

| 2 September 2022; 09:00 | Report | Hungary | 23–4 | Israel | Spaladium Arena, Split; Referees: Marta Cabañas (ESP), Erkan Turkkan (TUR) |
| 2 September 2022; 09:00 | Report | Score by quarters: 4–0, 7–2, 6–1, 6–1 | | | Spaladium Arena, Split; Referees: Marta Cabañas (ESP), Erkan Turkkan (TUR) |
| 2 September 2022; 09:00 | Report | Manhercz 6 | Goals | Gros 2 | Spaladium Arena, Split; Referees: Marta Cabañas (ESP), Erkan Turkkan (TUR) |

| 2 September 2022; 12:00 | Report | Serbia | 17–6 | Slovenia | Spaladium Arena, Split; Referees: Alessia Ferrari (ITA), Stanko Ivanovksi (MNE) |
| 2 September 2022; 12:00 | Report | Score by quarters: 5–2, 2–3, 6–1, 4–0 | | | Spaladium Arena, Split; Referees: Alessia Ferrari (ITA), Stanko Ivanovksi (MNE) |
| 2 September 2022; 12:00 | Report | S. Rašović 4 | Goals | Popovič 2 | Spaladium Arena, Split; Referees: Alessia Ferrari (ITA), Stanko Ivanovksi (MNE) |

== Placement games ==
=== 13–16th place bracket ===
13–16th place semifinals
4 September
Slovakia | 7
Germany | 18
4 September
Malta | 13
Slovenia | 9

13th place
6 September
Germany | 14
Malta | 11
15th place
6 September
Slovakia | 11
Slovenia | 5

==== 13–16th place semifinals ====
| 4 September 2022; 10:00 | Report | Slovakia | 7–18 | Germany | Spaladium Arena, Split; Referees: Filippo Gomez (ITA), Vojin Putniković (SRB) |
| 4 September 2022; 10:00 | Report | Score by quarters: 1–4, 2–6, 0–3, 4–5 | | | Spaladium Arena, Split; Referees: Filippo Gomez (ITA), Vojin Putniković (SRB) |
| 4 September 2022; 10:00 | Report | Čaraj 3 | Goals | three players 3 | Spaladium Arena, Split; Referees: Filippo Gomez (ITA), Vojin Putniković (SRB) |

| 4 September 2022; 11:30 | Report | Malta | 13–9 | Slovenia | Spaladium Arena, Split; Referees: Nenad Periš (CRO), Erkan Turkkan (TUR) |
| 4 September 2022; 11:30 | Report | Score by quarters: 3–2, 2–3, 3–3, 5–1 | | | Spaladium Arena, Split; Referees: Nenad Periš (CRO), Erkan Turkkan (TUR) |
| 4 September 2022; 11:30 | Report | D. Zammit 3 | Goals | Justin, Kadivec 2 | Spaladium Arena, Split; Referees: Nenad Periš (CRO), Erkan Turkkan (TUR) |

==== 15th place game ====
| 6 September 2022; 09:00 | Report | Slovakia | 11–5 | Slovenia | Spaladium Arena, Split; Referees: Irakli Sanadze (GEO), Peter Balzan (MLT) |
| 6 September 2022; 09:00 | Report | Score by quarters: 3–2, 3–1, 2–2, 3–0 | | | Spaladium Arena, Split; Referees: Irakli Sanadze (GEO), Peter Balzan (MLT) |
| 6 September 2022; 09:00 | Report | Baláž 6 | Goals | Stele 2 | Spaladium Arena, Split; Referees: Irakli Sanadze (GEO), Peter Balzan (MLT) |

==== 13th place game ====
| 6 September 2022; 10:30 | Report | Germany | 14–11 | Malta | Spaladium Arena, Split; Referees: Eurico Silva (POR), Robert Horváth (SVK) |
| 6 September 2022; 10:30 | Report | Score by quarters: 3–3, 3–1, 3–5, 5–2 | | | Spaladium Arena, Split; Referees: Eurico Silva (POR), Robert Horváth (SVK) |
| 6 September 2022; 10:30 | Report | Küppers, Schütze 3 | Goals | D. Zammit 5 | Spaladium Arena, Split; Referees: Eurico Silva (POR), Robert Horváth (SVK) |

== Knockout stage ==
=== Bracket ===
Play-offs
4 September
Montenegro | 13
Romania | 8
4 September
Greece | 22
Israel | 9
4 September
France | 10
Serbia | 9
4 September
Georgia | 12
Netherlands | 8

Quarter-finals
6 September
Hungary | 11
Montenegro | 8
6 September
Spain | 9
Greece | 5
6 September
Italy | 16
France | 8
6 September
Croatia | 15
Georgia | 5

Semi-finals
8 September
Hungary | 10
Spain | 8
8 September
Italy | 10
Croatia | 11

Final
10 September
Hungary | 9
Croatia | 10
Third place
10 September
Spain | 7
Italy | 6

=== Playoffs ===
| 4 September 2022; 15:00 | Report | Montenegro | 13–8 | Romania | Spaladium Arena, Split; Referees: Boris Margeta (SLO), Sebastien Dervieux (FRA) |
| 4 September 2022; 15:00 | Report | Score by quarters: 2–3, 4–2, 3–2, 4–1 | | | Spaladium Arena, Split; Referees: Boris Margeta (SLO), Sebastien Dervieux (FRA) |
| 4 September 2022; 15:00 | Report | Đurđić, Petković 3 | Goals | Neamtu 3 | Spaladium Arena, Split; Referees: Boris Margeta (SLO), Sebastien Dervieux (FRA) |

| 4 September 2022; 16:30 | Report | Georgia | 12–8 | Netherlands | Spaladium Arena, Split; Referees: Adrian Alexandrescu (ROU), Stanko Ivanovski (MNE) |
| 4 September 2022; 16:30 | Report | Score by quarters: 2–3, 5–1, 2–2, 3–2 | | | Spaladium Arena, Split; Referees: Adrian Alexandrescu (ROU), Stanko Ivanovski (MNE) |
| 4 September 2022; 16:30 | Report | Jelaca 3 | Goals | Van Ijperen, Winkelhorst 2 | Spaladium Arena, Split; Referees: Adrian Alexandrescu (ROU), Stanko Ivanovski (MNE) |

| 4 September 2022; 19:00 | Report | Greece | 22–9 | Israel | Spaladium Arena, Split; Referees: Michiel Zwart (NED), Radoslaw Koryzna (POL) |
| 4 September 2022; 19:00 | Report | Score by quarters: 6–0, 6–4, 5–3, 5–2 | | | Spaladium Arena, Split; Referees: Michiel Zwart (NED), Radoslaw Koryzna (POL) |
| 4 September 2022; 19:00 | Report | five players 3 | Goals | four players 2 | Spaladium Arena, Split; Referees: Michiel Zwart (NED), Radoslaw Koryzna (POL) |

| 4 September 2022; 20:30 | Report | France | 10–9 | Serbia | Spaladium Arena, Split; Referees: Georgios Stavridis (GRE), Matan Schwartz (ISR) |
| 4 September 2022; 20:30 | Report | Score by quarters: 3–1, 1–1, 5–4, 1–3 | | | Spaladium Arena, Split; Referees: Georgios Stavridis (GRE), Matan Schwartz (ISR) |
| 4 September 2022; 20:30 | Report | Crousillat 4 | Goals | Mandić, S. Rašović 3 | Spaladium Arena, Split; Referees: Georgios Stavridis (GRE), Matan Schwartz (ISR) |

=== 9–12th place bracket ===
9–12th place semifinals
6 September
Romania (PSO) | 8 (3)
Israel | 8 (2)
6 September
Netherlands | 6 (5)
Serbia (PSO) | 6 (6)

Ninth place
8 September
Romania | 1
Serbia | 17
Eleventh place
8 September
Israel | 7
Netherlands | 17

==== 9–12th place semifinals ====
| 6 September 2022; 12:00 | Report | Romania | 11–10 (PSO) | Israel | Spaladium Arena, Split; Referees: Jaume Teixido (ESP), Filippo Gomez (ITA) |
| 6 September 2022; 12:00 | Report | Score by quarters: 2–2, 2–2, 2–2, 2–2 PSO: 3–2 | | | Spaladium Arena, Split; Referees: Jaume Teixido (ESP), Filippo Gomez (ITA) |
| 6 September 2022; 12:00 | Report | Fulea 5 | Goals | Gros 5 | Spaladium Arena, Split; Referees: Jaume Teixido (ESP), Filippo Gomez (ITA) |

| 6 September 2022; 13:30 | Report | Netherlands | 11–12 (PSO) | Serbia | Spaladium Arena, Split; Referees: Sebastien Dervieux (FRA), Erkan Turkkan (TUR) |
| 6 September 2022; 13:30 | Report | Score by quarters: 1–2, 1–3, 4–1, 0–0 PSO: 5–6 | | | Spaladium Arena, Split; Referees: Sebastien Dervieux (FRA), Erkan Turkkan (TUR) |
| 6 September 2022; 13:30 | Report | Gielen 3 | Goals | Drašović, Stojanović 2 | Spaladium Arena, Split; Referees: Sebastien Dervieux (FRA), Erkan Turkkan (TUR) |

==== Eleventh place game ====
| 8 September 2022; 10:00 | Report | Israel | 7–17 | Netherlands | Spaladium Arena, Split; Referees: Sebastien Dervieux (FRA), Stanko Ivanovski (MNE) |
| 8 September 2022; 10:00 | Report | Score by quarters: 1–4, 1–2, 3–7, 2–4 | | | Spaladium Arena, Split; Referees: Sebastien Dervieux (FRA), Stanko Ivanovski (MNE) |
| 8 September 2022; 10:00 | Report | Frid, Goldschmidt 2 | Goals | three players 3 | Spaladium Arena, Split; Referees: Sebastien Dervieux (FRA), Stanko Ivanovski (MNE) |

==== Ninth place game ====
| 8 September 2022; 11:30 | Report | Romania | 1–17 | Serbia | Spaladium Arena, Split; Referees: Jaume Teixido (ESP), Tamás Kovács (HUN) |
| 8 September 2022; 11:30 | Report | Score by quarters: 1–6, 0–3, 0–4, 0–4 | | | Spaladium Arena, Split; Referees: Jaume Teixido (ESP), Tamás Kovács (HUN) |
| 8 September 2022; 11:30 | Report | Colodrovschi 1 | Goals | Drašović, Martinović 4 | Spaladium Arena, Split; Referees: Jaume Teixido (ESP), Tamás Kovács (HUN) |

=== Quarterfinals ===
| 6 September 2022; 15:00 | Report | Hungary | 11–8 | Montenegro | Spaladium Arena, Split; Referees: Nenad Periš (CRO), Michiel Zwart (NED) |
| 6 September 2022; 15:00 | Report | Score by quarters: 3–1, 2–3, 2–1, 4–3 | | | Spaladium Arena, Split; Referees: Nenad Periš (CRO), Michiel Zwart (NED) |
| 6 September 2022; 15:00 | Report | Jansik 5 | Goals | three players 2 | Spaladium Arena, Split; Referees: Nenad Periš (CRO), Michiel Zwart (NED) |

| 6 September 2022; 16:30 | Report | Italy | 16–8 | France | Spaladium Arena, Split; Referees: Georgios Stavridis (GRE), Tamás Kovács (HUN) |
| 6 September 2022; 16:30 | Report | Score by quarters: 2–3, 5–2, 4–1, 5–2 | | | Spaladium Arena, Split; Referees: Georgios Stavridis (GRE), Tamás Kovács (HUN) |
| 6 September 2022; 16:30 | Report | Di Fulvio 4 | Goals | Vernoux 3 | Spaladium Arena, Split; Referees: Georgios Stavridis (GRE), Tamás Kovács (HUN) |

| 6 September 2022; 19:00 | Report | Spain | 9–5 | Greece | Spaladium Arena, Split; Referees: Boris Margeta (SLO), Vojin Putniković (SRB) |
| 6 September 2022; 19:00 | Report | Score by quarters: 4–2, 1–1, 2–1, 2–1 | | | Spaladium Arena, Split; Referees: Boris Margeta (SLO), Vojin Putniković (SRB) |
| 6 September 2022; 19:00 | Report | three players 2 | Goals | Vlachopoulos 2 | Spaladium Arena, Split; Referees: Boris Margeta (SLO), Vojin Putniković (SRB) |

| 6 September 2022; 20:30 | Report | Croatia | 15–5 | Georgia | Spaladium Arena, Split; Referees: Adrian Alexandrescu (ROU), Frank Ohme (GER) |
| 6 September 2022; 20:30 | Report | Score by quarters: 4–0, 2–2, 6–1, 3–2 | | | Spaladium Arena, Split; Referees: Adrian Alexandrescu (ROU), Frank Ohme (GER) |
| 6 September 2022; 20:30 | Report | Bukić 4 | Goals | Shushiashvili 3 | Spaladium Arena, Split; Referees: Adrian Alexandrescu (ROU), Frank Ohme (GER) |

=== 5–8th place bracket ===
5–8th place semifinals
8 September
Montenegro | 12
Greece | 14
8 September
France | 7
Georgia | 5

Fifth place
10 September
Greece | 10
France | 8
Seventh place
10 September
Montenegro | 14
Georgia | 11

==== 5–8th place semifinals ====
| 8 September 2022; 14:00 | Report | Montenegro | 12–14 | Greece | Spaladium Arena, Split; Referees: Matan Schwartz (ISR), Frank Ohme (GER) |
| 8 September 2022; 14:00 | Report | Score by quarters: 2–1, 3–2, 2–6, 5–5 | | | Spaladium Arena, Split; Referees: Matan Schwartz (ISR), Frank Ohme (GER) |
| 8 September 2022; 14:00 | Report | Petković 3 | Goals | Genidounias 5 | Spaladium Arena, Split; Referees: Matan Schwartz (ISR), Frank Ohme (GER) |

| 8 September 2022; 15:30 | Report | Georgia | 5–7 | France | Spaladium Arena, Split; Referees: Nenad Periš (CRO), Filippo Gomez (ITA) |
| 8 September 2022; 15:30 | Report | Score by quarters: 1–1, 1–2, 1–2, 2–2 | | | Spaladium Arena, Split; Referees: Nenad Periš (CRO), Filippo Gomez (ITA) |
| 8 September 2022; 15:30 | Report | Shushiashvili 3 | Goals | Khasz 2 | Spaladium Arena, Split; Referees: Nenad Periš (CRO), Filippo Gomez (ITA) |

==== Seventh place game ====
| 10 September 2022; 14:00 | Report | Montenegro | 14–11 | Georgia | Spaladium Arena, Split; Referees: Georgios Stavridis (GRE), Sébastien Dervieux (FRA) |
| 10 September 2022; 14:00 | Report | Score by quarters: 6–4, 2–1, 4–3, 2–3 | | | Spaladium Arena, Split; Referees: Georgios Stavridis (GRE), Sébastien Dervieux (FRA) |
| 10 September 2022; 14:00 | Report | Averka, Petković 3 | Goals | three players 2 | Spaladium Arena, Split; Referees: Georgios Stavridis (GRE), Sébastien Dervieux (FRA) |

==== Fifth place game ====
| 10 September 2022; 15:30 | Report | Greece | 10–8 | France | Spaladium Arena, Split; Referees: Filippo Gomez (ITA), Vojin Putniković (SRB) |
| 10 September 2022; 15:30 | Report | Score by quarters: 3–2, 4–1, 2–2, 1–3 | | | Spaladium Arena, Split; Referees: Filippo Gomez (ITA), Vojin Putniković (SRB) |
| 10 September 2022; 15:30 | Report | three players 2 | Goals | Khasz 3 | Spaladium Arena, Split; Referees: Filippo Gomez (ITA), Vojin Putniković (SRB) |

=== Semifinals ===
| 8 September 2022; 18:00 | Report | Hungary | 10–8 | Spain | Spaladium Arena, Split; Referees: Boris Margeta (SLO), Michiel Zwart (NED) |
| 8 September 2022; 18:00 | Report | Score by quarters: 2–3, 5–2, 0–2, 3–1 | | | Spaladium Arena, Split; Referees: Boris Margeta (SLO), Michiel Zwart (NED) |
| 8 September 2022; 18:00 | Report | Nagy 3 | Goals | Granados 3 | Spaladium Arena, Split; Referees: Boris Margeta (SLO), Michiel Zwart (NED) |

| 8 September 2022; 20:30 | Report | Italy | 10–11 | Croatia | Spaladium Arena, Split; Referees: Georgios Stavridis (GRE), Vojin Putniković (SRB) |
| 8 September 2022; 20:30 | Report | Score by quarters: 2–3, 3–3, 3–3, 2–2 | | | Spaladium Arena, Split; Referees: Georgios Stavridis (GRE), Vojin Putniković (SRB) |
| 8 September 2022; 20:30 | Report | Di Fulvio 3 | Goals | Marinić Kragić 4 | Spaladium Arena, Split; Referees: Georgios Stavridis (GRE), Vojin Putniković (SRB) |

=== Third place game ===
| 10 September 2022; 18:00 | Report | Spain | 7–6 | Italy | Spaladium Arena, Split; Referees: Nenad Periš (CRO), Michiel Zwart (NED) |
| 10 September 2022; 18:00 | Report | Score by quarters: 3–1, 0–2, 3–1, 1–2 | | | Spaladium Arena, Split; Referees: Nenad Periš (CRO), Michiel Zwart (NED) |
| 10 September 2022; 18:00 | Report | seven players 1 | Goals | Damonte 2 | Spaladium Arena, Split; Referees: Nenad Periš (CRO), Michiel Zwart (NED) |

=== Final ===
| 10 September 2022; 20:30 | Report | Hungary | 9–10 | Croatia | Spaladium Arena, Split; Referees: Boris Margeta (SLO), Adrian Alexandrescu (ROU) |
| 10 September 2022; 20:30 | Report | Score by quarters: 3–3, 0–1, 4–4, 2–2 | | | Spaladium Arena, Split; Referees: Boris Margeta (SLO), Adrian Alexandrescu (ROU) |
| 10 September 2022; 20:30 | Report | Jansik, Molnár 2 | Goals | Burić, Kharkov 3 | Spaladium Arena, Split; Referees: Boris Margeta (SLO), Adrian Alexandrescu (ROU) |

== Final standings ==
| Rank | Team |
|---|---|
| 1st place, gold medalist(s) | Croatia |
| 2nd place, silver medalist(s) | Hungary |
| 3rd place, bronze medalist(s) | Spain |
| 4 | Italy |
| 5 | Greece |
| 6 | France |
| 7 | Montenegro |
| 8 | Georgia |
| 9 | Serbia |
| 10 | Romania |
| 11 | Netherlands |
| 12 | Israel |
| 13 | Germany |
| 14 | Malta |
| 15 | Slovakia |
| 16 | Slovenia |

| Qualified for the 2023 World Championships |

== Awards and statistics ==
=== Top goalscorers ===
| Rank | Name | Goals | Shots | % |
|---|---|---|---|---|
| 1 | (Romania) Tudor Fulea | 19 | 40 | 48 |
| 2 | (Montenegro) Kanstantsin Averka | 18 | 37 | 49 |
| 3 | (Hungary) Krisztián Manhercz | 17 | 26 | 65 |
| 4 | (Spain) Álvaro Granados | 16 | 39 | 41 |
| 5 | (Greece) Stylianos Argyropoulos | 15 | 31 | 48 |
| 5 | (Italy) Francesco Di Fulvio | 15 | 37 | 41 |
| 5 | (Serbia) Radomir Drašović | 15 | 26 | 58 |
| 8 | (Croatia) Jerko Marinić Kragić | 14 | 32 | 44 |
| 8 | (France) Ugo Crousillat | 14 | 36 | 36 |
| 8 | (Israel) Ronen Gros | 14 | 33 | 42 |

=== Awards ===
The awards were announced on 9 September 2022.

| Position | Player |
|---|---|
| Best goalkeeper | (Croatia) Marko Bijač |
| Most Valuable Player | (Hungary) Szilárd Jansik |
