= Water polo at the 2020 Summer Olympics – Women's qualification =

The qualification for the 2020 women's Olympic water polo tournament (postponed to 2021 due to the COVID-19 pandemic) allocated ten teams quota spots: the hosts, the top team in the World League, the top team in the World Championships, five continental Olympic qualification tournament champions, and the two top teams at an Olympic qualifying tournament.

== Qualification summary ==
Event	Dates	Hosts	Quota	Qualifier(s)
Host nation	—	—	1	Japan
2019 FINA World League	4–9 June 2019	Hungary	1	United States
2019 FINA World Championships	14–26 July 2019	(South Korea) Gwangju	1	Spain
2019 Pan American Games	4–10 August 2019	(Peru) Lima	1	Canada
Oceanian Continental Selection	—	—	1	Australia
African Continental Selection	—	—	1	South Africa
2020 European Championships	12–25 January 2020	(Hungary) Budapest	1	ROC
2018 Asian Games	16–21 August 2018	(Indonesia) Jakarta	1	China
World Qualification Tournament	19–24 January 2021	(Italy) Trieste	2	Hungary
World Qualification Tournament	19–24 January 2021	(Italy) Trieste	2	Netherlands
Total			10	

== 2019 FINA World League ==
The best team in the 2019 World League qualified for the Olympics.

Rank	Team
Gold medal	United States
Silver medal	Italy
Bronze medal	Russia
4	Netherlands
5	Australia
6	Hungary
7	Canada
8	China

== 2019 World Championships ==
The top team in the 2019 World Championships qualified for the Olympics.

Rank	Team
1st place, gold medalist(s)	United States^{1}
2nd place, silver medalist(s)	Spain
3rd place, bronze medalist(s)	Australia
4	Hungary
5	Russia
6	Italy
7	Netherlands
8	Greece
9	Canada
10	Kazakhstan
11	China
12	New Zealand
13	Japan
14	South Africa
15	Cuba
16	South Korea

^{1} The United States qualified for the Olympics by winning the 2019 World League.

== Continental tournaments ==
One team from each continental qualifying event qualifies for the Olympics.

=== Asia ===
Nur-Sultan, Kazakhstan, was supposed to host the Asian continental tournament from 12 to 16 February. In late January the event was cancelled as the Kazakh Government suspended all flights and visas from China due to concerns about the coronavirus pandemic in the Eastern part of the country. In mid-February AASF decided to use the final ranking of 2018 Asian Games to allocate its continental quotas to the winners and the slots in the WQT to the following teams in said ranking. The decision was later made official by FINA and the berths for the Olympic Games and for the WQT went to China and Kazakhstan respectively; since the remaining eligible teams from the Asian Games (Thailand, Indonesia and Hong Kong) all declined to participate in the WQT, FINA invited Uzbekistan.

Rank	Team
1st place, gold medalist(s)	China
2nd place, silver medalist(s)	Kazakhstan
3rd place, bronze medalist(s)	Japan^{1}
4	Thailand
5	Indonesia
6	Hong Kong

^{1}Japan qualified for the Olympics as host.

=== Europe ===
Rank	Team
1st place, gold medalist(s)	Spain^{1}
2nd place, silver medalist(s)	Russia
3rd place, bronze medalist(s)	Hungary
4	Netherlands
5	Italy
6	Greece
7	France
8	Slovakia
9	Israel
10	Croatia
11	Germany
12	Serbia

^{1} Spain qualified for the Olympics by finishing second in the 2019 World Championships.

=== Americas ===
Rank	Team
1st place, gold medalist(s)	United States^{1}
2nd place, silver medalist(s)	Canada
3rd place, bronze medalist(s)	Brazil
4	Cuba
5	Puerto Rico
6	Mexico
7	Venezuela
8	Peru

^{1} The United States qualified for the Olympics by winning the 2019 World League.

== World Qualification Tournament ==
The tournament was scheduled to be contested in Trieste, Italy, from 17 to 24 May but was postponed due to the COVID-19 pandemic. The draw of pools was held at FINA headquarters in Lausanne, Switzerland, on 11 February 2020. The top two teams qualified for the Olympics. It now takes place from 19 to 24 January 2021.

=== Participating teams ===
The draw took place on 11 February 2020 in Lausanne, Switzerland.

Group A	Group B
Netherlands; France; Italy; ~~Uzbekistan~~; Slovakia	Greece; Hungary; Israel; ~~New Zealand~~; Kazakhstan

=== Final ranking ===
Qualified for the Summer Olympics

Rank	Team
1st place, gold medalist(s)	Hungary
2nd place, silver medalist(s)	Netherlands
3rd place, bronze medalist(s)	Greece
4	Italy
5	France
6	Kazakhstan
7	Israel
8	Slovakia

== See also ==
- Water polo at the 2020 Summer Olympics – Men's qualification
