= Water polo at the 2020 Summer Olympics – Men's qualification =

The qualification for the 2020 men's Olympic water polo tournament allocated twelve teams quota spots: the hosts, the top team in the World League, the top two teams in the World Championships, five continental Olympic qualification tournament champions, and the three top teams at an Olympic qualifying tournament.

== Qualification summary ==
Event	Dates	Hosts	Quota	Qualifier(s)
Host nation	—	—	1	Japan
2019 FINA World League	18–23 June 2019	(Serbia) Belgrade	1	Serbia
2019 FINA World Championships	15–27 July 2019	(South Korea) Gwangju	2	Italy
2019 FINA World Championships	15–27 July 2019	(South Korea) Gwangju	2	Spain
2019 Pan American Games	4–10 August 2019	(Peru) Lima	1	United States
Oceanian Continental Selection	—	—	1	Australia
African Continental Selection	—	—	1	South Africa
2020 European Championships	14–26 January 2020	(Hungary) Budapest	1	Hungary
2018 Asian Games	25 August – 1 September 2018	(Indonesia) Jakarta	1	Kazakhstan
World Qualification Tournament	14–21 February 2021	(Netherlands) Rotterdam	3	Croatia
World Qualification Tournament	14–21 February 2021	(Netherlands) Rotterdam	3	Greece
World Qualification Tournament	14–21 February 2021	(Netherlands) Rotterdam	3	Montenegro
Total			12	

== 2019 FINA World League ==
The best team in the 2019 World League qualified for the Olympics.

Rank	Team
Gold medal	Serbia
Silver medal	Croatia
Bronze medal	Australia
4	Spain
5	Hungary
6	Japan
7	Kazakhstan
8	Canada

== 2019 World Championships ==
The top two teams in the 2019 World Championships qualified for the Olympics.

Rank	Team
1st place, gold medalist(s)	Italy
2nd place, silver medalist(s)	Spain
3rd place, bronze medalist(s)	Croatia
4	Hungary
5	Serbia
6	Australia
7	Greece
8	Germany
9	United States
10	Montenegro
11	Japan
12	South Africa
13	Brazil
14	Kazakhstan
15	South Korea
16	New Zealand

== Continental tournaments ==
One team from each continental qualifying event qualifies for the Olympics.

=== Asia ===
Nur-Sultan, Kazakhstan, was supposed to host the Asian continental tournament from 12 to 16 February. In late January the event was cancelled as the Kazakh Government suspended all flights and visas from China due to concerns about the coronavirus pandemic in the Eastern part of the country. In mid-February AASF decided to use the final ranking of 2018 Asian Games to allocate its continental quotas to the winners and the slots in WQT to the following teams in said ranking; the decision must yet be made official by FINA and IOC before the World Qualification Tournament, scheduled from 22 to 29 March.

=== Europe ===
Rank	Team
1st place, gold medalist(s)	Hungary
2nd place, silver medalist(s)	Spain
3rd place, bronze medalist(s)	Montenegro
4	Croatia
5	Serbia
6	Italy
7	Greece
8	Russia
9	Germany
10	Georgia
11	Romania
12	Turkey
13	France
14	Slovakia
15	Netherlands
16	Malta

=== Americas ===
Rank	Team
1st place, gold medalist(s)	United States
2nd place, silver medalist(s)	Canada
3rd place, bronze medalist(s)	Brazil
4	Argentina
5	Cuba
6	Puerto Rico
7	Mexico
8	Peru

== World Qualification Tournament ==
The tournament was scheduled to be contested in Rotterdam, Netherlands, from 31 May to 7 June but was postponed to 14 to 21 February 2021 due to the COVID-19 pandemic. The draw of pools was held at FINA headquarters in Lausanne, Switzerland, on 11 February 2020. The top three teams qualified for the Olympics. It than took place from 21 to 28 February 2021.

=== Participating teams ===
The draw took place on 11 February 2020 in Lausanne, Switzerland.

Group A	Group B
Georgia; ~~Turkey~~; Canada; Brazil; Montenegro; Greece	Croatia; Netherlands; France; Russia; Germany; Romania^{1}

^{1} Argentina withdrew from the tournament in mid-February. FINA replaced the South-American team with Romania

=== Final ranking ===
Qualified for the Summer Olympics

Rank	Team
1st place, gold medalist(s)	Montenegro
2nd place, silver medalist(s)	Greece
3rd place, bronze medalist(s)	Croatia
4	Russia
5	Netherlands
6	France
7	Georgia
8	Canada
9	Romania
10	Brazil
11	Germany
DSQ	Turkey

== See also ==
- Water polo at the 2020 Summer Olympics – Women's qualification
