= Danube Arena =

Aquatics complex in Budapest, Hungary

Danube Arena (Duna Aréna)
- Dagály Budapest Aquatics Complex
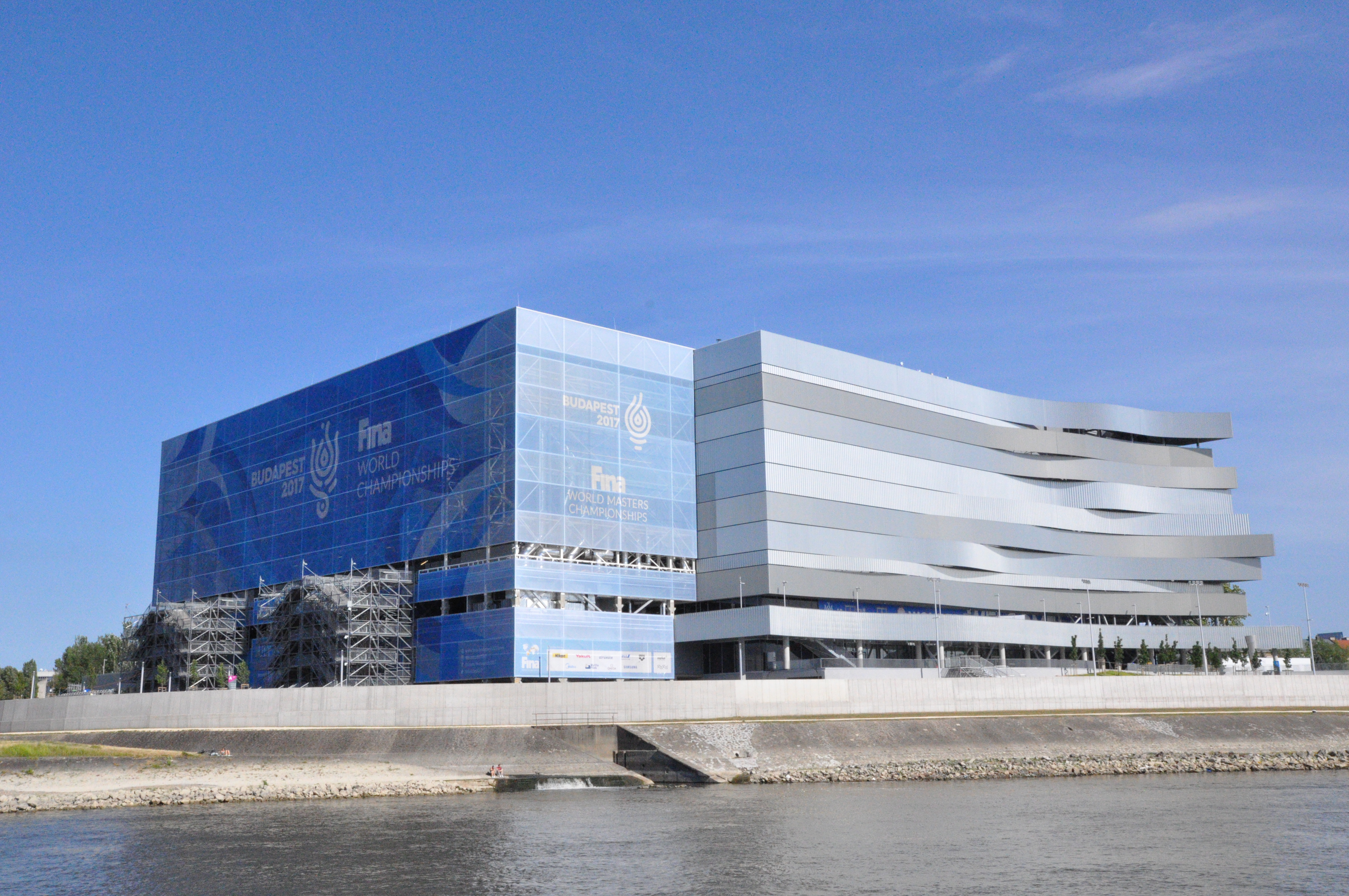
- Interactive map of Danube Arena (Duna Aréna)
- Location: Budapest, Hungary
- Coordinates: 47°32′27″N 19°3′44″E
- Capacity: 5,000 (permanent) and 8,000 (temporary) (13,000 total)

Construction
- Groundbreaking: May 2015
- Built: February 2017
- Architect: Marcell Ferenc

The Danube Arena (in Hungarian: Duna Aréna, unofficially Dagály Budapest Aquatics Complex) is an aquatics complex located in Budapest, Hungary. It was designed by Marcell Ferenc and built between 2015 and 2017.

== Design and construction ==
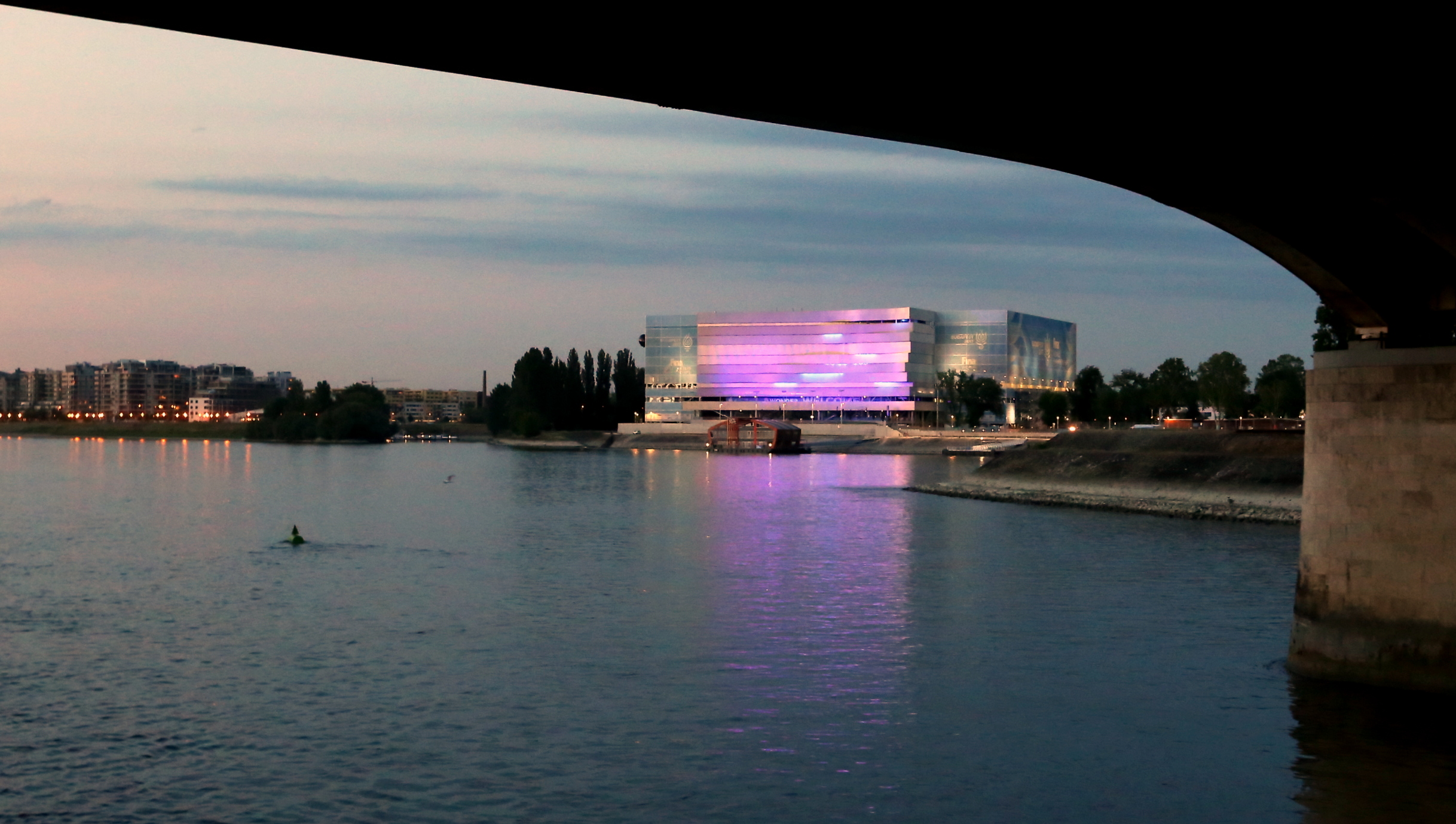
Danube Arena, 2017

Originally, the arena was intended to be the home of the World Aquatics Championships in 2021, but after the original host venue for the 2017 Championships in Guadalajara withdrew in February 2015, Budapest, including the Danube Arena, was announced as the host for the 2017 Championships instead. Following the decision to move Budapest's hosting duties four years earlier, the building was re-designed, partially due to the originally-planned building being too small to be a potential venue for the 2024 Summer Olympics and also because of the advanced deadline.

== Technical features ==
The facility has two Olympic-size swimming pools, a diving pool and a short course training pool.

In terms of seating capacity, there are 5,000 permanent seats plus an additional 8,000 temporary seats, which were used for the 2017 World Aquatics Championships and dismantled afterwards.

== Gallery ==
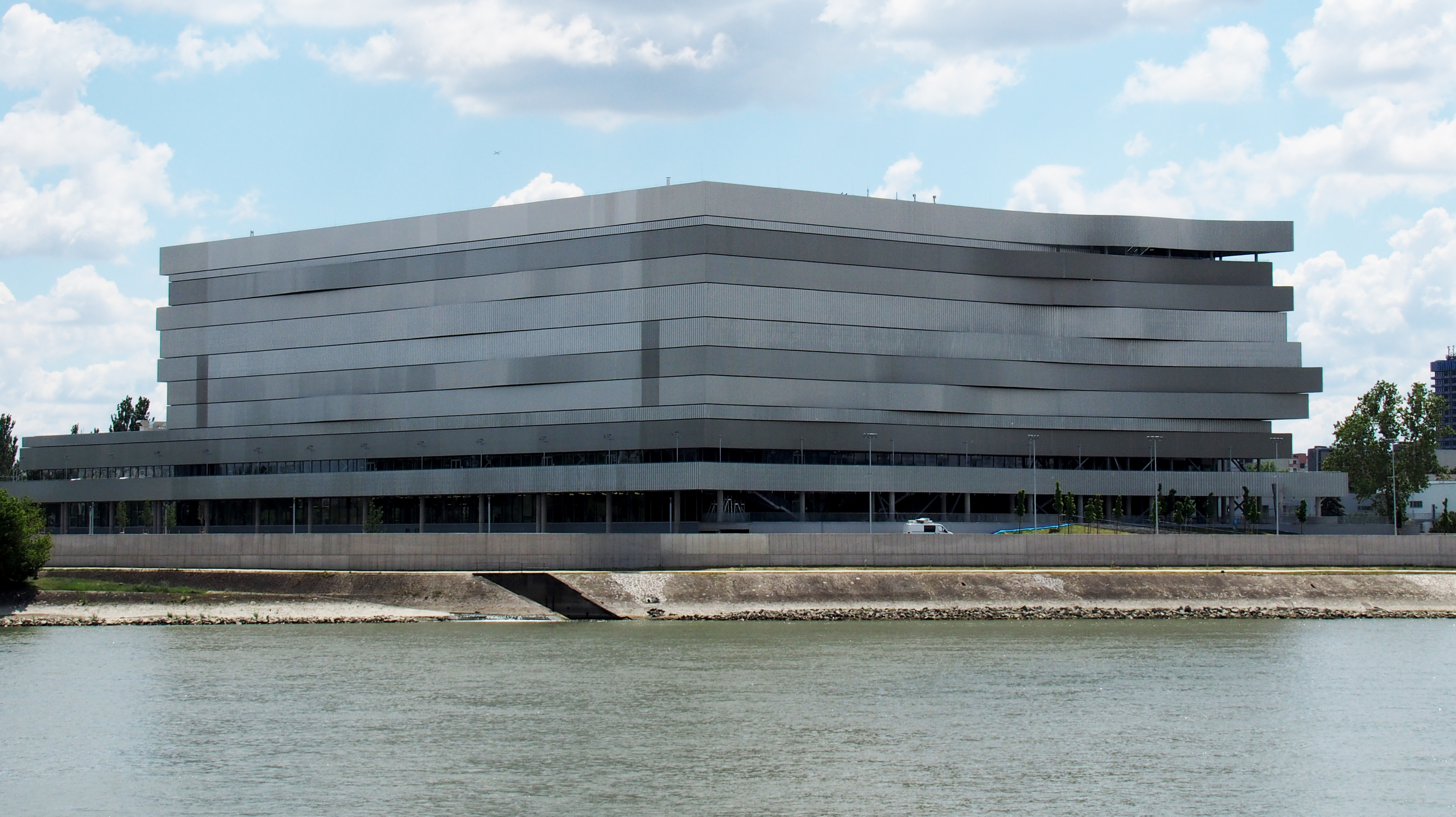
Exterior view of the arena

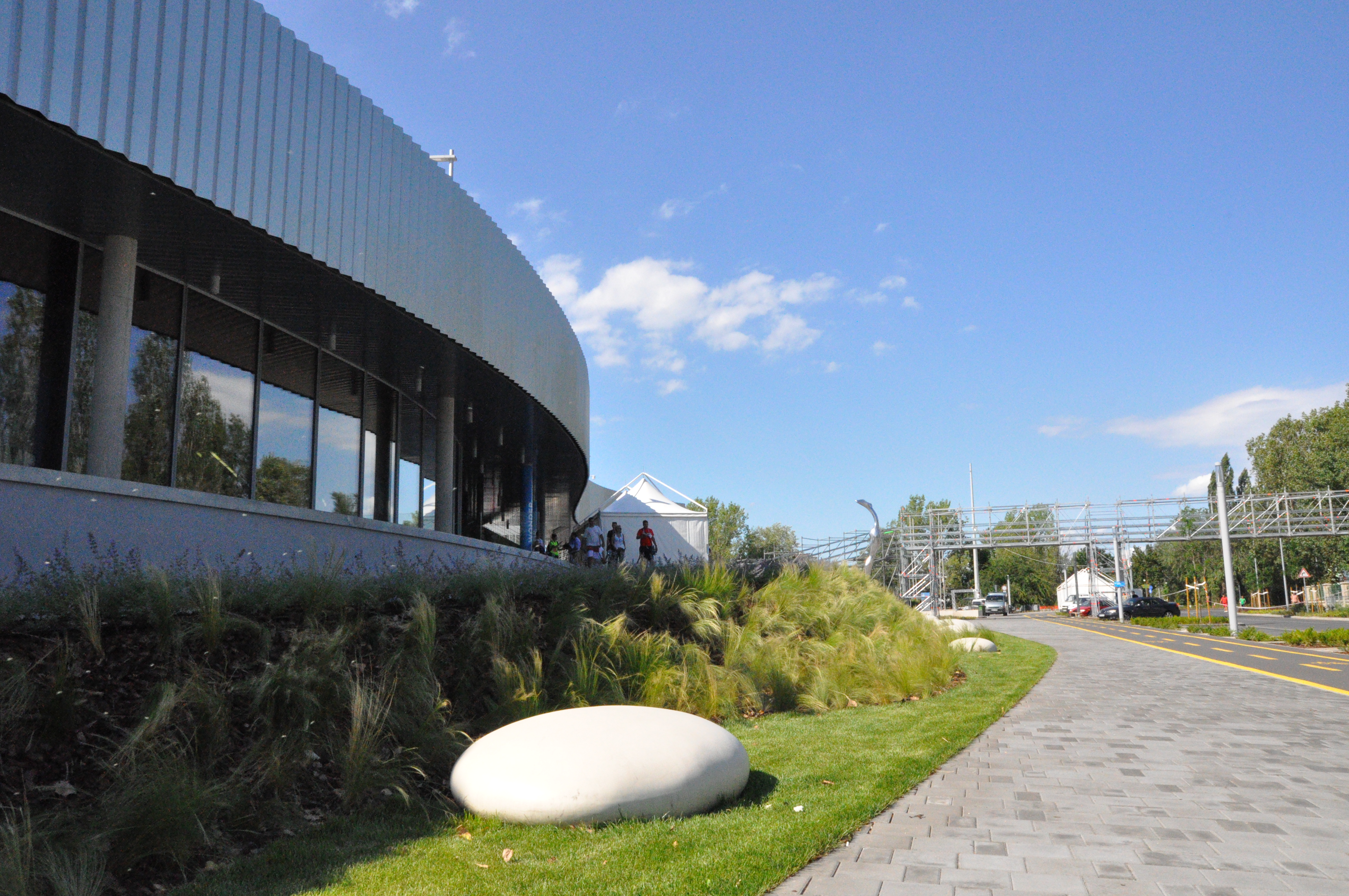
The Danube Arena in Budapest

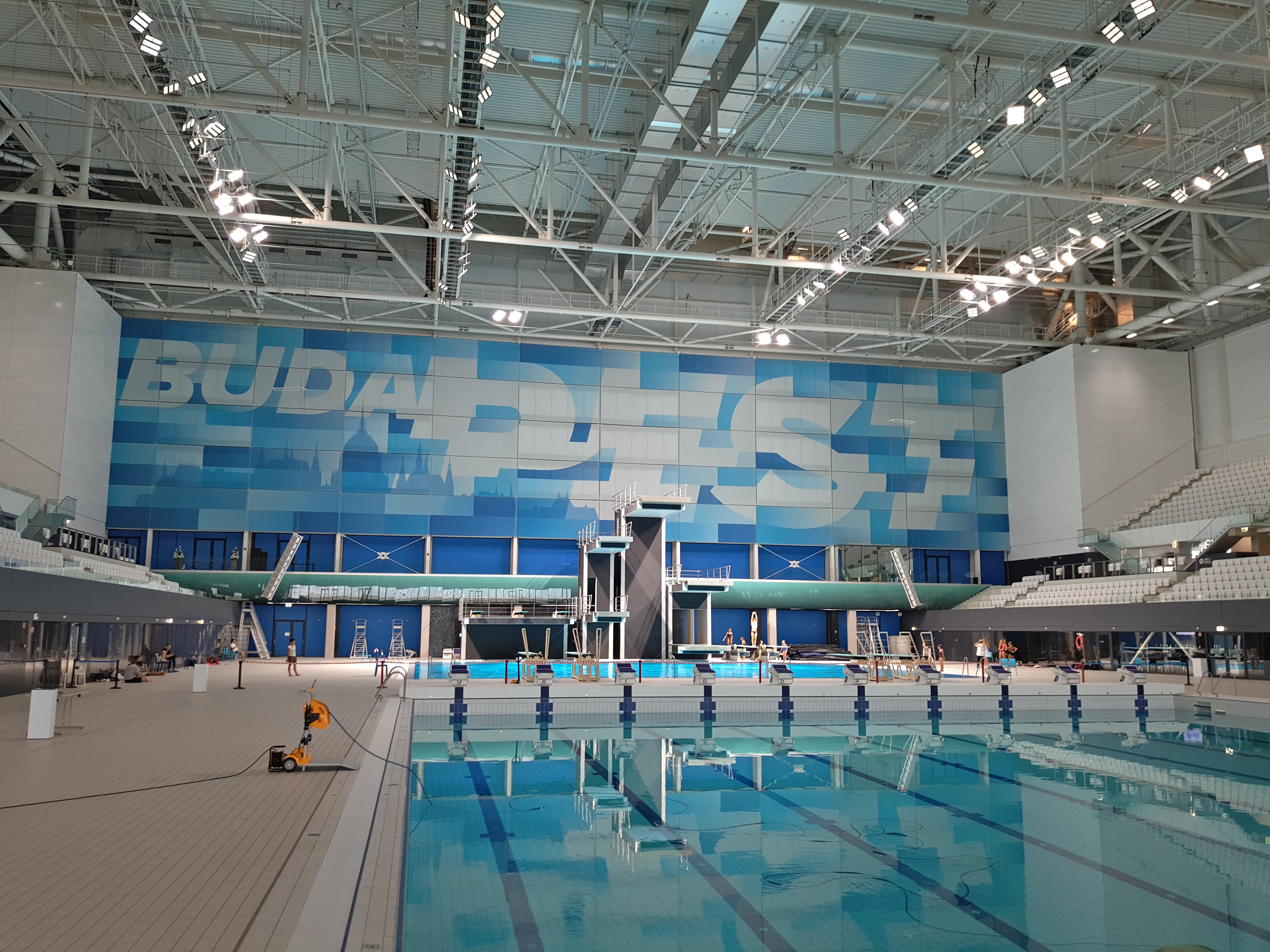
Inside the arena

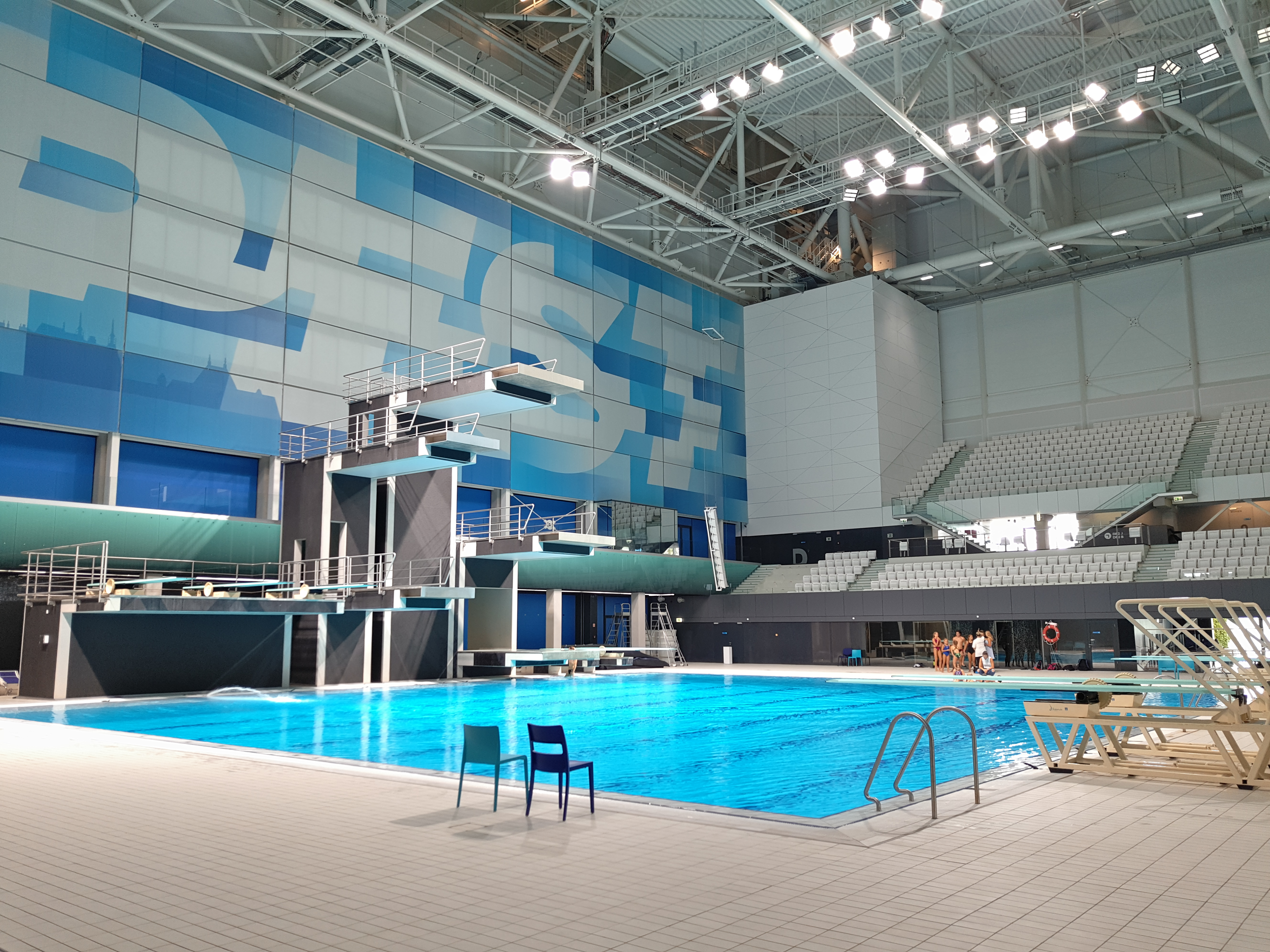
The diving tower

== Notable events ==
- European Aquatics Championships: 2020
- European Water Polo Championship: 2020 Men's, 2020 Women's
- FINA Swimming World Cup: 2018, 2019, 2021
- FINA Water Polo World League: 2018 Men's, 2019 Women's
- International Swimming League: 2019, 2020
- LEN Champions League: 2016–2017, 2020–21
- World Aquatics Championships: 2017, 2022
- World Junior Artistic Swimming Championships: 2018
- World Junior Swimming Championships: 2019
