= 2022 Men's European Water Polo Championship Qualifiers =

2022 Water Polo Euro Qualifiers

The tournaments of the qualifications for the 2022 Men's European Water Polo Championship were held between 17 and 20 February 2022. 17 teams, split into four groups, participated in the qualifications. The top two teams from each group advanced to the final tournament.

== Group A ==
Pos	Team	Pld	W	D	L	GF	GA	GD	Pts	Qualification
1	France	4	3	1	0	80	27	+53	10 (Note: France 9–9 Germany)	Final tournament
2	Germany	4	3	1	0	64	20	+44	10	Final tournament
3	Slovenia (H)	4	2	0	2	42	61	−19	6	
4	Switzerland	4	1	0	3	24	66	−42	3	
5	Belgium	4	0	0	4	30	66	−36	0	

Source: LEN
Rules for classification: 1) points; 2) head-to-head points; 3) head-to-head goal difference; 4) head-to-head number of goals scored; 5) goal difference.
(H) Hosts
Notes:

All times are (UTC+1).

17 February 2022; 18:00	Report	Switzerland	3–25	France	Indoor Olympic Swimming Pool Kranj, Kranj; Referees: Matan Schwartz (ISR), Declan McKerr (IRL)
17 February 2022; 18:00	Report	Score by quarters: 1–7, 1–5, 0–8, 1–5			Indoor Olympic Swimming Pool Kranj, Kranj; Referees: Matan Schwartz (ISR), Declan McKerr (IRL)
17 February 2022; 18:00	Report	three players 1	Goals	Bouet 7	Indoor Olympic Swimming Pool Kranj, Kranj; Referees: Matan Schwartz (ISR), Declan McKerr (IRL)

17 February 2022; 20:30	Report	Slovenia	15–10	Belgium	Indoor Olympic Swimming Pool Kranj, Kranj; Referees: Vyacheslav Byelyevtsov (UKR), Haldun Toygarlı (TUR)
17 February 2022; 20:30	Report	Score by quarters: 4–3, 3–1, 5–3, 3–3			Indoor Olympic Swimming Pool Kranj, Kranj; Referees: Vyacheslav Byelyevtsov (UKR), Haldun Toygarlı (TUR)
17 February 2022; 20:30	Report	Kadivec, Pus 3	Goals	Dulin 3	Indoor Olympic Swimming Pool Kranj, Kranj; Referees: Vyacheslav Byelyevtsov (UKR), Haldun Toygarlı (TUR)

18 February 2022; 10:00	Report	France	20–4	Belgium	Indoor Olympic Swimming Pool Kranj, Kranj; Referees: Vyacheslav Byelyevtsov (UKR), Declan McKerr (IRL)
18 February 2022; 10:00	Report	Score by quarters: 6–2, 6–1, 4–1, 4–0			Indoor Olympic Swimming Pool Kranj, Kranj; Referees: Vyacheslav Byelyevtsov (UKR), Declan McKerr (IRL)
18 February 2022; 10:00	Report	Caumette 5	Goals	four players 1	Indoor Olympic Swimming Pool Kranj, Kranj; Referees: Vyacheslav Byelyevtsov (UKR), Declan McKerr (IRL)

18 February 2022; 12:00	Report	Switzerland	1–19	Germany	Indoor Olympic Swimming Pool Kranj, Kranj; Referees: Matan Schwartz (ISR), Haldun Toygarlı (TUR)
18 February 2022; 12:00	Report	Score by quarters: 1–3, 0–5, 0–4, 0–7			Indoor Olympic Swimming Pool Kranj, Kranj; Referees: Matan Schwartz (ISR), Haldun Toygarlı (TUR)
18 February 2022; 12:00	Report	Melet 1	Goals	Restović 6	Indoor Olympic Swimming Pool Kranj, Kranj; Referees: Matan Schwartz (ISR), Haldun Toygarlı (TUR)

18 February 2022; 18:00	Report	France	9–9	Germany	Indoor Olympic Swimming Pool Kranj, Kranj; Referees: Boris Margeta (SLO), Matan Schwartz (ISR)
18 February 2022; 18:00	Report	Score by quarters: 2–2, 2–0, 2–4, 3–3			Indoor Olympic Swimming Pool Kranj, Kranj; Referees: Boris Margeta (SLO), Matan Schwartz (ISR)
18 February 2022; 18:00	Report	Crousillat 3	Goals	Cuk 3	Indoor Olympic Swimming Pool Kranj, Kranj; Referees: Boris Margeta (SLO), Matan Schwartz (ISR)

18 February 2022; 20:00	Report	Slovenia	11–5	Switzerland	Indoor Olympic Swimming Pool Kranj, Kranj; Referees: Vyacheslav Byelyevtsov (UKR), Haldun Toygarlı (TUR)
18 February 2022; 20:00	Report	Score by quarters: 2–0, 3–1, 5–1, 1–3			Indoor Olympic Swimming Pool Kranj, Kranj; Referees: Vyacheslav Byelyevtsov (UKR), Haldun Toygarlı (TUR)
18 February 2022; 20:00	Report	Popovič 3	Goals	Alfano 2	Indoor Olympic Swimming Pool Kranj, Kranj; Referees: Vyacheslav Byelyevtsov (UKR), Haldun Toygarlı (TUR)

19 February 2022; 18:00	Report	Belgium	11–15	Switzerland	Indoor Olympic Swimming Pool Kranj, Kranj; Referees: Vyacheslav Byelyevtsov (UKR), Declan McKerr (IRL)
19 February 2022; 18:00	Report	Score by quarters: 1–2, 3–3, 2–5, 5–5			Indoor Olympic Swimming Pool Kranj, Kranj; Referees: Vyacheslav Byelyevtsov (UKR), Declan McKerr (IRL)
19 February 2022; 18:00	Report	Dulin, Van der Jeugt 3	Goals	Carballo, Herzog 4	Indoor Olympic Swimming Pool Kranj, Kranj; Referees: Vyacheslav Byelyevtsov (UKR), Declan McKerr (IRL)

19 February 2022; 20:00	Report	Slovenia	5–20	Germany	Indoor Olympic Swimming Pool Kranj, Kranj; Referees: Haldun Toygarlı (TUR), Matan Schwartz (ISR)
19 February 2022; 20:00	Report	Score by quarters: 1–4, 2–5, 0–5, 2–6			Indoor Olympic Swimming Pool Kranj, Kranj; Referees: Haldun Toygarlı (TUR), Matan Schwartz (ISR)
19 February 2022; 20:00	Report	Lah 2	Goals	Küppers 6	Indoor Olympic Swimming Pool Kranj, Kranj; Referees: Haldun Toygarlı (TUR), Matan Schwartz (ISR)

20 February 2022; 09:30	Report	Belgium	5–16	Germany	Indoor Olympic Swimming Pool Kranj, Kranj; Referees: Vyacheslav Byelyevtsov (UKR), Haldun Toygarlı (TUR)
20 February 2022; 09:30	Report	Score by quarters: 1–3, 1–6, 2–4, 1–3			Indoor Olympic Swimming Pool Kranj, Kranj; Referees: Vyacheslav Byelyevtsov (UKR), Haldun Toygarlı (TUR)
20 February 2022; 09:30	Report	Van der Linden 2	Goals	Schütze 5	Indoor Olympic Swimming Pool Kranj, Kranj; Referees: Vyacheslav Byelyevtsov (UKR), Haldun Toygarlı (TUR)

20 February 2022; 11:30	Report	Slovenia	11–26	France	Indoor Olympic Swimming Pool Kranj, Kranj; Referees: Matan Schwartz (ISR), Declan McKerr (IRL)
20 February 2022; 11:30	Report	Score by quarters: 2–7, 2–5, 4–5, 3–9			Indoor Olympic Swimming Pool Kranj, Kranj; Referees: Matan Schwartz (ISR), Declan McKerr (IRL)
20 February 2022; 11:30	Report	Kadivec, Nastran 3	Goals	Bouet 10	Indoor Olympic Swimming Pool Kranj, Kranj; Referees: Matan Schwartz (ISR), Declan McKerr (IRL)

== Group B ==
Pos	Team	Pld	W	D	L	GF	GA	GD	Pts	Qualification
1	Georgia (H)	3	3	0	0	65	22	+43	9	Final tournament
2	Slovakia	3	2	0	1	60	32	+28	6	Final tournament
3	Belarus	3	1	0	2	30	54	−24	3	
4	Poland	3	0	0	3	17	64	−47	0	

Source: LEN
Rules for classification: 1) points; 2) head-to-head points; 3) head-to-head goal difference; 4) head-to-head number of goals scored; 5) goal difference.
(H) Hosts

All times are (UTC+4).

18 February 2022; 17:00	Report	Poland	6–25	Slovakia	Tbilisi; Referees: Ghislain Dehon (FRA), Alain D'Hossche (BEL)
18 February 2022; 17:00	Report	Score by quarters: 1–5, 3–6, 2–7, 0–7			Tbilisi; Referees: Ghislain Dehon (FRA), Alain D'Hossche (BEL)
18 February 2022; 17:00	Report	Rudzińsk, Szymonik 2	Goals	Baláž 6	Tbilisi; Referees: Ghislain Dehon (FRA), Alain D'Hossche (BEL)

18 February 2022; 19:00	Report	Georgia	25–5	Belarus	Tbilisi; Referees: Nerijus Papaurėlis (LTU), Stefan Seidel (GER)
18 February 2022; 19:00	Report	Score by quarters: 7–1, 7–1, 5–1, 6–2			Tbilisi; Referees: Nerijus Papaurėlis (LTU), Stefan Seidel (GER)
18 February 2022; 19:00	Report	Shushiahvili 6	Goals	five players 1	Tbilisi; Referees: Nerijus Papaurėlis (LTU), Stefan Seidel (GER)

19 February 2022; 17:00	Report	Belarus	8–19	Slovakia	Tbilisi; Referees: Alain D'Hossche (BEL), Stefan Seidel (GER)
19 February 2022; 17:00	Report	Score by quarters: 2–5, 1–5, 3–5, 2–4			Tbilisi; Referees: Alain D'Hossche (BEL), Stefan Seidel (GER)
19 February 2022; 17:00	Report	Filimonau 3	Goals	Tkáč 6	Tbilisi; Referees: Alain D'Hossche (BEL), Stefan Seidel (GER)

19 February 2022; 19:00	Report	Georgia	22–1	Poland	Tbilisi; Referees: Ghislain Dehon (FRA), Nerijus Papaurėlis (LTU)
19 February 2022; 19:00	Report	Score by quarters: 8–0, 7–1, 2–0, 5–0			Tbilisi; Referees: Ghislain Dehon (FRA), Nerijus Papaurėlis (LTU)
19 February 2022; 19:00	Report	four players 3	Goals	Ożga 1	Tbilisi; Referees: Ghislain Dehon (FRA), Nerijus Papaurėlis (LTU)

20 February 2022; 11:00	Report	Poland	10–17	Belarus	Tbilisi; Referees: Alain D'Hossche (BEL), Nerijus Papaurėlis (LTU)
20 February 2022; 11:00	Report	Score by quarters: 2–3, 4–6, 2–4, 2–4			Tbilisi; Referees: Alain D'Hossche (BEL), Nerijus Papaurėlis (LTU)
20 February 2022; 11:00	Report	Maciejewski 4	Goals	Filimonau 4	Tbilisi; Referees: Alain D'Hossche (BEL), Nerijus Papaurėlis (LTU)

20 February 2022; 13:00	Report	Georgia	18–16	Slovakia	Tbilisi; Referees: Ghislain Dehon (FRA), Stefan Seidel (GER)
20 February 2022; 13:00	Report	Score by quarters: 7–5, 5–3, 3–6, 3–2			Tbilisi; Referees: Ghislain Dehon (FRA), Stefan Seidel (GER)
20 February 2022; 13:00	Report	Shushiashvili 3	Goals	Čaraj, Zaťovič 3	Tbilisi; Referees: Ghislain Dehon (FRA), Stefan Seidel (GER)

== Group C ==
Pos	Team	Pld	W	D	L	GF	GA	GD	Pts	Qualification
1	Romania	3	3	0	0	73	10	+63	9	Final tournament
2	Malta (H)	3	2	0	1	51	27	+24	6	Final tournament
3	Lithuania	3	1	0	2	23	38	−15	3	
4	Ireland	3	0	0	3	14	86	−72	0	

Source: LEN
Rules for classification: 1) points; 2) head-to-head points; 3) head-to-head goal difference; 4) head-to-head number of goals scored; 5) goal difference.
(H) Hosts

All times are (UTC+1).

18 February 2022; 17:00	Report	Romania	14–1	Lithuania	Tal-Qroqq Sports Complex, Msida; Referees: Peter Radič (SVK), Łukasz Król (POL)
18 February 2022; 17:00	Report	Score by quarters: 1–0, 5–0, 4–1, 4–0			Tal-Qroqq Sports Complex, Msida; Referees: Peter Radič (SVK), Łukasz Król (POL)
18 February 2022; 17:00	Report	Fulea 4	Goals	Galinok 1	Tal-Qroqq Sports Complex, Msida; Referees: Peter Radič (SVK), Łukasz Król (POL)

18 February 2022; 18:30	Report	Malta	28–4	Ireland	Tal-Qroqq Sports Complex, Msida; Referees: Erwin Schapers (NED), Tomaž Kavčič (SLO)
18 February 2022; 18:30	Report	Score by quarters: 5–0, 8–0, 7–1, 8–3			Tal-Qroqq Sports Complex, Msida; Referees: Erwin Schapers (NED), Tomaž Kavčič (SLO)
18 February 2022; 18:30	Report	Muscat, M. Zammit 6	Goals	McMahon 3	Tal-Qroqq Sports Complex, Msida; Referees: Erwin Schapers (NED), Tomaž Kavčič (SLO)

19 February 2022; 17:00	Report	Romania	41–5	Ireland	Tal-Qroqq Sports Complex, Msida; Referees: Peter Radič (SVK), Erwin Schapers (NED)
19 February 2022; 17:00	Report	Score by quarters: 10–0, 12–1, 11–1, 8–3			Tal-Qroqq Sports Complex, Msida; Referees: Peter Radič (SVK), Erwin Schapers (NED)
19 February 2022; 17:00	Report	Georgescu 6	Goals	Walshe 2	Tal-Qroqq Sports Complex, Msida; Referees: Peter Radič (SVK), Erwin Schapers (NED)

19 February 2022; 18:30	Report	Malta	19–5	Lithuania	Tal-Qroqq Sports Complex, Msida; Referees: Tomaž Kavčič (SLO), Łukasz Król (POL)
19 February 2022; 18:30	Report	Score by quarters: 5–2, 4–3, 2–0, 8–0			Tal-Qroqq Sports Complex, Msida; Referees: Tomaž Kavčič (SLO), Łukasz Król (POL)
19 February 2022; 18:30	Report	Muscat, M. Zammit 5	Goals	Tomaševski 2	Tal-Qroqq Sports Complex, Msida; Referees: Tomaž Kavčič (SLO), Łukasz Król (POL)

20 February 2022; 09:00	Report	Ireland	5–17	Lithuania	Tal-Qroqq Sports Complex, Msida; Referees: Łukasz Król (POL), Peter Radič (SVK)
20 February 2022; 09:00	Report	Score by quarters: 1–2, 0–2, 4–7, 0–6			Tal-Qroqq Sports Complex, Msida; Referees: Łukasz Król (POL), Peter Radič (SVK)
20 February 2022; 09:00	Report	Connolly, Fitzgerald 2	Goals	four players 3	Tal-Qroqq Sports Complex, Msida; Referees: Łukasz Król (POL), Peter Radič (SVK)

20 February 2022; 10:30	Report	Malta	4–18	Romania	Tal-Qroqq Sports Complex, Msida; Referees: Tomaž Kavčič (SLO), Erwin Schapers (NED)
20 February 2022; 10:30	Report	Score by quarters: 1–5, 0–2, 2–3, 1–8			Tal-Qroqq Sports Complex, Msida; Referees: Tomaž Kavčič (SLO), Erwin Schapers (NED)
20 February 2022; 10:30	Report	Galea 2	Goals	Fulea, Georgescu 4	Tal-Qroqq Sports Complex, Msida; Referees: Tomaž Kavčič (SLO), Erwin Schapers (NED)

== Group D ==
Pos	Team	Pld	W	D	L	GF	GA	GD	Pts	Qualification
1	Netherlands	3	3	0	0	48	22	+26	9	Final tournament
2	Israel (H)	3	2	0	1	20	23	−3	6	Final tournament
3	Turkey	3	0	1	2	24	34	−10	1 (Note: Turkey 7–7 Ukraine)	
4	Ukraine	3	0	1	2	21	34	−13	1	

Source: LEN
Rules for classification: 1) points; 2) head-to-head points; 3) head-to-head goal difference; 4) head-to-head number of goals scored; 5) goal difference.
(H) Hosts
Notes:

All times are (UTC+2).

18 February 2022; 16:30	Report	Turkey	7–7	Ukraine	Netanya; Referees: Massimo Kastrilli (SUI), Mihnea Alexandrescu (ROU)
18 February 2022; 16:30	Report	Score by quarters: 1–1, 2–1, 1–1, 3–4			Netanya; Referees: Massimo Kastrilli (SUI), Mihnea Alexandrescu (ROU)
18 February 2022; 16:30	Report	Albayrak 2	Goals	three players 2	Netanya; Referees: Massimo Kastrilli (SUI), Mihnea Alexandrescu (ROU)

18 February 2022; 18:00	Report	Israel	4–10	Netherlands	Netanya; Referees: Peter Balzan (MLT), Philipp Golosoun (BLR)
18 February 2022; 18:00	Report	Score by quarters: 2–2, 0–4, 0–2, 2–2			Netanya; Referees: Peter Balzan (MLT), Philipp Golosoun (BLR)
18 February 2022; 18:00	Report	four players 1	Goals	Janssen 3	Netanya; Referees: Peter Balzan (MLT), Philipp Golosoun (BLR)

19 February 2022; 17:00	Report	Turkey	10–18	Netherlands	Netanya; Referees: Mihnea Alexandrescu (ROU), Philipp Golosoun (BLR)
19 February 2022; 17:00	Report	Score by quarters: 2–3, 4–3, 1–6, 3–6			Netanya; Referees: Mihnea Alexandrescu (ROU), Philipp Golosoun (BLR)
19 February 2022; 17:00	Report	Sönmez 4	Goals	Koopman, Te Riele 4	Netanya; Referees: Mihnea Alexandrescu (ROU), Philipp Golosoun (BLR)

19 February 2022; 18:30	Report	Israel	7–6	Ukraine	Netanya; Referees: Peter Balzan (MLT), Massimo Kastrilli (SUI)
19 February 2022; 18:30	Report	Score by quarters: 3–1, 2–3, 0–1, 2–1			Netanya; Referees: Peter Balzan (MLT), Massimo Kastrilli (SUI)
19 February 2022; 18:30	Report	Fried 3	Goals	Ashanin 2	Netanya; Referees: Peter Balzan (MLT), Massimo Kastrilli (SUI)

20 February 2022; 09:30	Report	Israel	9–7	Turkey	Netanya
20 February 2022; 09:30	Report	Score by quarters: 3–1, 4–1, 2–4, 0–1			Netanya
20 February 2022; 09:30	Report	Gros 4	Goals	Acar 2	Netanya

20 February 2022; 11:00	Report	Ukraine	8–20	Netherlands	Netanya; Referees: Philipp Golosoun (BLR), Massimo Kastrilli (SUI)
20 February 2022; 11:00	Report	Score by quarters: 2–3, 2–8, 4–6, 0–3			Netanya; Referees: Philipp Golosoun (BLR), Massimo Kastrilli (SUI)
20 February 2022; 11:00	Report	eight players 1	Goals	three players 3	Netanya; Referees: Philipp Golosoun (BLR), Massimo Kastrilli (SUI)

== See also ==
- 2022 Women's European Water Polo Championship Qualifiers
