= 2020 Men's European Water Polo Championship =

Water polo tournament

Tournament details
- Host country: Hungary
- Venue: 1 (in 1 host city)
- Dates: 14–26 January
- Teams: 16 (from 1 confederation)

Final positions
- Champions: Hungary (13th title)
- Runners-up: Spain
- Third place: Montenegro
- Fourth place: Croatia

Tournament statistics
- Matches played: 48
- Goals scored: 988 (20.58 per match)
- Top scorers: (Russia) Konstantin Kharkov (21 goals)

Awards
- Best player: (Hungary) Dénes Varga

The 2020 Men's European Water Polo Championship was the 34th edition of the major European water polo tournament for national teams. It was held at the Danube Arena in Budapest, Hungary, from 14 to 26 January 2020.

Hungary claimed their 13th title by defeating Spain in the final.

== Host ==
LEN announced the choice of Budapest as host for the competition on 9 July 2016. All the matches were played at the Danube Arena.

Budapest	2020 Men's European Water Polo Championship (Europe)
Danube Arena	2020 Men's European Water Polo Championship (Europe)
Capacity: 6,600	2020 Men's European Water Polo Championship (Europe)

== Qualification ==
Sixteen teams were allowed to the tournament. The qualification was as follows:

- The host nation
- The best seven teams from the 2018 European Championships not already qualified as the host nation
- Eight teams from the qualifiers

Event	Date	Location	Vacancies	Qualified
Host nation	9 July 2016	–	1	Hungary
2018 European Championships	16–28 July 2018	(Spain) Barcelona	7	Serbia; Spain; Croatia; Italy; Greece; Montenegro; Russia
Qualifiers	11–13 October 2019	Various	8	Georgia; Germany; Slovakia; France; Romania; Malta; Turkey; Netherlands

== Format ==
The sixteen teams were split in four groups with four teams each. The first classified team of each group directly qualified for the quarterfinals, the second and third teams played each other in cross group format to qualify for the quarterfinals.

== Draw ==
The draw of the preliminary round's pools was held in Budapest on 22 October 2019. The teams were divided into four groups of four teams each; according to LEN rules the first batch for the draw was composed by the best four teams of the previous edition, the second batch by the teams ranked from fifth to eighth in 2018, while the third and fourth batch were composed respectively by the teams ranked first and second in the four qualification groups.

Pot 1	Pot 2	Pot 3	Pot 4
Serbia; Spain; Croatia; Italy	Greece; Montenegro; Russia; Hungary	Georgia; Slovakia; Romania; Turkey	Germany; France; Malta; Netherlands

The draw resulted in the following groups:

Group A	Group B	Group C	Group D
Croatia	Netherlands	Hungary	France
Germany	Romania	Malta	Georgia
Montenegro	Russia	Spain	Greece
Slovakia	Serbia	Turkey	Italy

== Preliminary round ==
All times are local (UTC+1).

=== Group A ===
Pos	Team	Pld	W	D	L	GF	GA	GD	Pts	Qualification
1	Croatia	3	3	0	0	44	23	+21	9	Quarterfinals
2	Montenegro	3	2	0	1	35	18	+17	6	Play-offs
3	Germany	3	1	0	2	20	32	−12	3	Play-offs
4	Slovakia	3	0	0	3	13	39	−26	0	13th place classification

Source: WP2020Budapest
Rules for classification: 1) points; 2) head-to-head points; 3) head-to-head goal difference; 4) head-to-head number of goals scored; 5) goal difference.

14 January 2020; 11:30	Report	Slovakia	4–15	Montenegro	Danube Arena, Budapest; Referees: Levan Berishvili (GEO), Sébastien Dervieux (FRA)
14 January 2020; 11:30	Report	Score by quarters: 2–1, 0–6, 1–4, 1–4			Danube Arena, Budapest; Referees: Levan Berishvili (GEO), Sébastien Dervieux (FRA)
14 January 2020; 11:30	Report	four players 1	Goals	Ivović 4	Danube Arena, Budapest; Referees: Levan Berishvili (GEO), Sébastien Dervieux (FRA)

14 January 2020; 14:30	Report	Germany	9–17	Croatia	Danube Arena, Budapest; Referees: Sergey Naumov (RUS), Raffaele Colombo (ITA)
14 January 2020; 14:30	Report	Score by quarters: 2–1, 2–6, 1–6, 4–4			Danube Arena, Budapest; Referees: Sergey Naumov (RUS), Raffaele Colombo (ITA)
14 January 2020; 14:30	Report	Restović 3	Goals	Miloš 3	Danube Arena, Budapest; Referees: Sergey Naumov (RUS), Raffaele Colombo (ITA)

16 January 2020; 10:00	Report	Germany	8–5	Slovakia	Danube Arena, Budapest; Referees: Levan Berishvili (GEO), Ivan Raković (SRB)
16 January 2020; 10:00	Report	Score by quarters: 4–1, 1–2, 3–2, 0–0			Danube Arena, Budapest; Referees: Levan Berishvili (GEO), Ivan Raković (SRB)
16 January 2020; 10:00	Report	Real 3	Goals	five players 1	Danube Arena, Budapest; Referees: Levan Berishvili (GEO), Ivan Raković (SRB)

16 January 2020; 20:30	Report	Montenegro	10–11	Croatia	Danube Arena, Budapest; Referees: Sergey Naumov (RUS), Raffaele Colombo (ITA)
16 January 2020; 20:30	Report	Score by quarters: 1–2, 2–4, 2–4, 5–1			Danube Arena, Budapest; Referees: Sergey Naumov (RUS), Raffaele Colombo (ITA)
16 January 2020; 20:30	Report	four players 2	Goals	Bukić 3	Danube Arena, Budapest; Referees: Sergey Naumov (RUS), Raffaele Colombo (ITA)

18 January 2020; 16:00	Report	Slovakia	4–16	Croatia	Danube Arena, Budapest; Referees: Svetlana Dreval (RUS), Georgios Stavridis (GRE)
18 January 2020; 16:00	Report	Score by quarters: 0–3, 2–4, 1–4, 1–5			Danube Arena, Budapest; Referees: Svetlana Dreval (RUS), Georgios Stavridis (GRE)
18 January 2020; 16:00	Report	four players 1	Goals	Bušlje 5	Danube Arena, Budapest; Referees: Svetlana Dreval (RUS), Georgios Stavridis (GRE)

18 January 2020; 17:30	Report	Germany	3–10	Montenegro	Danube Arena, Budapest; Referees: Raffaele Colombo (ITA), Matan Schwartz (ISR)
18 January 2020; 17:30	Report	Score by quarters: 1–2, 0–3, 1–3, 1–2			Danube Arena, Budapest; Referees: Raffaele Colombo (ITA), Matan Schwartz (ISR)
18 January 2020; 17:30	Report	Gielen 2	Goals	four players 2	Danube Arena, Budapest; Referees: Raffaele Colombo (ITA), Matan Schwartz (ISR)

=== Group B ===
Pos	Team	Pld	W	D	L	GF	GA	GD	Pts	Qualification
1	Serbia	3	3	0	0	39	20	+19	9	Quarterfinals
2	Russia	3	1	0	2	34	33	+1	3 (Note: Russia 3 Pts, +5 GD; Romania 3 Pts, 0 GD; Netherlands 3 Pts, −5 GD)	Play-offs
3	Romania	3	1	0	2	26	34	−8	3	Play-offs
4	Netherlands	3	1	0	2	22	34	−12	3	13th place classification

Source: WP2020Budapest
Rules for classification: 1) points; 2) head-to-head points; 3) head-to-head goal difference; 4) head-to-head number of goals scored; 5) goal difference.
Notes:

14 January 2020; 10:00	Report	Romania	8–9	Netherlands	Danube Arena, Budapest; Referees: Robert Tiozzo (CRO), Gernot Häntschel (GER)
14 January 2020; 10:00	Report	Score by quarters: 2–2, 2–3, 4–1, 0–3			Danube Arena, Budapest; Referees: Robert Tiozzo (CRO), Gernot Häntschel (GER)
14 January 2020; 10:00	Report	Gheorghe 3	Goals	Winkelhorst 3	Danube Arena, Budapest; Referees: Robert Tiozzo (CRO), Gernot Häntschel (GER)

14 January 2020; 17:30	Report	Serbia	13–9	Russia	Danube Arena, Budapest; Referees: Carlos Ortega (ESP), Róbert Horváth (SVK)
14 January 2020; 17:30	Report	Score by quarters: 3–1, 4–3, 2–3, 4–2			Danube Arena, Budapest; Referees: Carlos Ortega (ESP), Róbert Horváth (SVK)
14 January 2020; 17:30	Report	Prlainović 4	Goals	Merkulov 3	Danube Arena, Budapest; Referees: Carlos Ortega (ESP), Róbert Horváth (SVK)

16 January 2020; 13:00	Report	Romania	7–15	Serbia	Danube Arena, Budapest; Referees: Erkan Turkkan (TUR), Peter Balzan (MLT)
16 January 2020; 13:00	Report	Score by quarters: 3–5, 1–1, 1–5, 2–4			Danube Arena, Budapest; Referees: Erkan Turkkan (TUR), Peter Balzan (MLT)
16 January 2020; 13:00	Report	Oanta, Radu 2	Goals	Mandić 4	Danube Arena, Budapest; Referees: Erkan Turkkan (TUR), Peter Balzan (MLT)

16 January 2020; 14:30	Report	Russia	15–9	Netherlands	Danube Arena, Budapest; Referees: Gernot Häntschel (GER), Matan Schwartz (ISR)
16 January 2020; 14:30	Report	Score by quarters: 3–2, 5–1, 3–2, 4–4			Danube Arena, Budapest; Referees: Gernot Häntschel (GER), Matan Schwartz (ISR)
16 January 2020; 14:30	Report	Kharkov 6	Goals	three players 2	Danube Arena, Budapest; Referees: Gernot Häntschel (GER), Matan Schwartz (ISR)

18 January 2020; 11:30	Report	Romania	11–10	Russia	Danube Arena, Budapest; Referees: Boris Margeta (SLO), Veselin Mišković (MNE)
18 January 2020; 11:30	Report	Score by quarters: 3–3, 3–2, 2–0, 3–5			Danube Arena, Budapest; Referees: Boris Margeta (SLO), Veselin Mišković (MNE)
18 January 2020; 11:30	Report	Gheorghe 4	Goals	Lisunov 3	Danube Arena, Budapest; Referees: Boris Margeta (SLO), Veselin Mišković (MNE)

18 January 2020; 20:30	Report	Serbia	11–4	Netherlands	Danube Arena, Budapest; Referees: Gernot Häntschel (GER), Erkan Turkkan (TUR)
18 January 2020; 20:30	Report	Score by quarters: 0–1, 3–1, 5–2, 3–0			Danube Arena, Budapest; Referees: Gernot Häntschel (GER), Erkan Turkkan (TUR)
18 January 2020; 20:30	Report	Mandić 3	Goals	Lindhout 2	Danube Arena, Budapest; Referees: Gernot Häntschel (GER), Erkan Turkkan (TUR)

=== Group C ===
Pos	Team	Pld	W	D	L	GF	GA	GD	Pts	Qualification
1	Hungary (H)	3	2	1	0	56	16	+40	7 (Note: Hungary 11–11 Spain)	Quarterfinals
2	Spain	3	2	1	0	58	25	+33	7	Play-offs
3	Turkey	3	1	0	2	25	53	−28	3	Play-offs
4	Malta	3	0	0	3	17	62	−45	0	13th place classification

Source: WP2020Budapest
Rules for classification: 1) points; 2) head-to-head points; 3) head-to-head goal difference; 4) head-to-head number of goals scored; 5) goal difference.
(H) Hosts
Notes:

14 January 2020; 13:00	Report	Malta	7–23	Spain	Danube Arena, Budapest; Referees: Diana Dutilh-Dumas (NED), Georgios Stavridis (GRE)
14 January 2020; 13:00	Report	Score by quarters: 3–4, 2–6, 0–7, 2–6			Danube Arena, Budapest; Referees: Diana Dutilh-Dumas (NED), Georgios Stavridis (GRE)
14 January 2020; 13:00	Report	S. Camilleri 3	Goals	Munarriz 5	Danube Arena, Budapest; Referees: Diana Dutilh-Dumas (NED), Georgios Stavridis (GRE)

14 January 2020; 19:00	Report	Turkey	5–19	Hungary	Danube Arena, Budapest; Referees: Luis Santos (POR), Ivan Raković (SRB)
14 January 2020; 19:00	Report	Score by quarters: 4–4, 0–4, 1–3, 0–8			Danube Arena, Budapest; Referees: Luis Santos (POR), Ivan Raković (SRB)
14 January 2020; 19:00	Report	Özbek, Yenigün 2	Goals	Manhercz 4	Danube Arena, Budapest; Referees: Luis Santos (POR), Ivan Raković (SRB)

16 January 2020; 11:30	Report	Malta	10–13	Turkey	Danube Arena, Budapest; Referees: Georgios Stavridis (GRE), Sébastien Dervieux (FRA)
16 January 2020; 11:30	Report	Score by quarters: 1–5, 3–4, 2–1, 4–3			Danube Arena, Budapest; Referees: Georgios Stavridis (GRE), Sébastien Dervieux (FRA)
16 January 2020; 11:30	Report	Plumpton 5	Goals	Sönmez 3	Danube Arena, Budapest; Referees: Georgios Stavridis (GRE), Sébastien Dervieux (FRA)

16 January 2020; 19:00	Report	Hungary	11–11	Spain	Danube Arena, Budapest; Referees: Adrian Alexandrescu (ROU), Michiel Zwart (NED)
16 January 2020; 19:00	Report	Score by quarters: 4–2, 1–2, 3–4, 3–3			Danube Arena, Budapest; Referees: Adrian Alexandrescu (ROU), Michiel Zwart (NED)
16 January 2020; 19:00	Report	Vámos 3	Goals	Perrone 4	Danube Arena, Budapest; Referees: Adrian Alexandrescu (ROU), Michiel Zwart (NED)

18 January 2020; 10:00	Report	Turkey	7–24	Spain	Danube Arena, Budapest; Referees: Levan Berishvili (GEO), Radosław Koryzna (POL)
18 January 2020; 10:00	Report	Score by quarters: 3–5, 1–6, 1–8, 2–5			Danube Arena, Budapest; Referees: Levan Berishvili (GEO), Radosław Koryzna (POL)
18 January 2020; 10:00	Report	Yutmaz 3	Goals	Munarriz 5	Danube Arena, Budapest; Referees: Levan Berishvili (GEO), Radosław Koryzna (POL)

18 January 2020; 19:00	Report	Malta	0–26	Hungary	Danube Arena, Budapest; Referees: Ivan Raković (SRB), Diana Dutilh-Dumas (NED)
18 January 2020; 19:00	Report	Score by quarters: 0–6, 0–7, 0–8, 0–5			Danube Arena, Budapest; Referees: Ivan Raković (SRB), Diana Dutilh-Dumas (NED)
18 January 2020; 19:00	Report		Goals	Zalánki 7	Danube Arena, Budapest; Referees: Ivan Raković (SRB), Diana Dutilh-Dumas (NED)

=== Group D ===
Pos	Team	Pld	W	D	L	GF	GA	GD	Pts	Qualification
1	Italy	3	3	0	0	38	19	+19	9	Quarterfinals
2	Greece	3	2	0	1	35	30	+5	6	Play-offs
3	Georgia	3	1	0	2	25	42	−17	3	Play-offs
4	France	3	0	0	3	24	31	−7	0	13th place classification

Source: WP2020Budapest
Rules for classification: 1) points; 2) head-to-head points; 3) head-to-head goal difference; 4) head-to-head number of goals scored; 5) goal difference.

14 January 2020; 16:00	Report	France	7–9	Georgia	Danube Arena, Budapest; Referees: Radosław Koryzna (POL), Erkan Turkkan (TUR)
14 January 2020; 16:00	Report	Score by quarters: 3–2, 2–3, 1–2, 1–2			Danube Arena, Budapest; Referees: Radosław Koryzna (POL), Erkan Turkkan (TUR)
14 January 2020; 16:00	Report	Izdinsky, Vernoux 2	Goals	Vapenski 3	Danube Arena, Budapest; Referees: Radosław Koryzna (POL), Erkan Turkkan (TUR)

14 January 2020; 20:30	Report	Italy	10–6	Greece	Danube Arena, Budapest; Referees: György Kun (HUN), Veselin Mišković (MNE)
14 January 2020; 20:30	Report	Score by quarters: 1–2, 3–2, 3–1, 3–1			Danube Arena, Budapest; Referees: György Kun (HUN), Veselin Mišković (MNE)
14 January 2020; 20:30	Report	three players 2	Goals	six players 1	Danube Arena, Budapest; Referees: György Kun (HUN), Veselin Mišković (MNE)

16 January 2020; 16:00	Report	Greece	17–10	Georgia	Danube Arena, Budapest; Referees: Gabriella Várkonyi (HUN), Robert Tiozzo (CRO)
16 January 2020; 16:00	Report	Score by quarters: 5–1, 6–1, 2–4, 4–4			Danube Arena, Budapest; Referees: Gabriella Várkonyi (HUN), Robert Tiozzo (CRO)
16 January 2020; 16:00	Report	Fountoulis 4	Goals	Rurua, Vapenski 2	Danube Arena, Budapest; Referees: Gabriella Várkonyi (HUN), Robert Tiozzo (CRO)

16 January 2020; 17:30	Report	France	7–10	Italy	Danube Arena, Budapest; Referees: Carlos Ortega (ESP), Luis Santos (POR)
16 January 2020; 17:30	Report	Score by quarters: 2–3, 1–3, 2–3, 2–1			Danube Arena, Budapest; Referees: Carlos Ortega (ESP), Luis Santos (POR)
16 January 2020; 17:30	Report	Vernoux 2	Goals	Di Fulvio, Figlioli 3	Danube Arena, Budapest; Referees: Carlos Ortega (ESP), Luis Santos (POR)

18 January 2020; 13:00	Report	France	10–12	Greece	Danube Arena, Budapest; Referees: György Kun (HUN), Carlos Ortega (ESP)
18 January 2020; 13:00	Report	Score by quarters: 1–3, 1–3, 6–3, 2–3			Danube Arena, Budapest; Referees: György Kun (HUN), Carlos Ortega (ESP)
18 January 2020; 13:00	Report	Crousillat, Marzouki 2	Goals	Vlachopoulos 5	Danube Arena, Budapest; Referees: György Kun (HUN), Carlos Ortega (ESP)

18 January 2020; 14:30	Report	Italy	18–6	Georgia	Danube Arena, Budapest; Referees: Róbert Horváth (SVK), Robert Tiozzo (CRO)
18 January 2020; 14:30	Report	Score by quarters: 4–1, 3–2, 5–3, 6–0			Danube Arena, Budapest; Referees: Róbert Horváth (SVK), Robert Tiozzo (CRO)
18 January 2020; 14:30	Report	three players 3	Goals	Magrakvelidze 2	Danube Arena, Budapest; Referees: Róbert Horváth (SVK), Robert Tiozzo (CRO)

== Knockout stage ==
=== Bracket ===
Play-offs
20 January
Montenegro	17
Turkey	6
20 January
Russia	14
Georgia	13
20 January
Germany	6
Spain	12
20 January
Romania	7
Greece	14

Quarterfinals
22 January
Italy	8
Montenegro	10
22 January
Hungary	14
Russia	10
22 January
Serbia	6 (3)
Spain (PSO)	6 (4)
22 January
Croatia	14
Greece	11

Semifinals
24 January
Montenegro	8
Hungary	10
24 January
Spain	9
Croatia	8

Final
26 January
Hungary (PSO)	9 (5)
Spain	9 (4)
Third place
26 January
Montenegro	10
Croatia	9

5th place bracket

5–8th place semifinals
24 January
Italy	14
Russia	12
24 January
Serbia	12
Greece	9

Fifth place
26 January
Italy	7
Serbia	8
Seventh place
26 January
Russia	9
Greece	11

9th place bracket

9–12th place semifinals
22 January
Turkey	6
Georgia	12
22 January
Germany	15
Romania	10

Ninth place
24 January
Georgia	8
Germany	9
Eleventh place
24 January
Turkey	3
Romania	20

13th place bracket

13–16th place semifinals
20 January
Slovakia	8
Malta	4
20 January
Netherlands	8
France	9

13th place
22 January
Slovakia	6
France	9
15th place
22 January
Malta	9
Netherlands	19

=== Play-offs ===
20 January 2020; 14:30	Report	Montenegro	17–6	Turkey	Danube Arena, Budapest; Referees: Georgios Stavridis (GRE), Gabriella Várkonyi (HUN)
20 January 2020; 14:30	Report	Score by quarters: 3–1, 5–1, 5–0, 4–4			Danube Arena, Budapest; Referees: Georgios Stavridis (GRE), Gabriella Várkonyi (HUN)
20 January 2020; 14:30	Report	Ivović 3	Goals	Özbek, Yenigün 2	Danube Arena, Budapest; Referees: Georgios Stavridis (GRE), Gabriella Várkonyi (HUN)

20 January 2020; 16:00	Report	Germany	6–12	Spain	Danube Arena, Budapest; Referees: Svetlana Dreval (RUS), Boris Margeta (SLO)
20 January 2020; 16:00	Report	Score by quarters: 1–1, 3–6, 0–3, 2–2			Danube Arena, Budapest; Referees: Svetlana Dreval (RUS), Boris Margeta (SLO)
20 January 2020; 16:00	Report	Real 2	Goals	Granados 5	Danube Arena, Budapest; Referees: Svetlana Dreval (RUS), Boris Margeta (SLO)

20 January 2020; 17:30	Report	Russia	14–13	Georgia	Danube Arena, Budapest; Referees: Michiel Zwart (NED), Sébastien Dervieux (FRA)
20 January 2020; 17:30	Report	Score by quarters: 6–4, 3–2, 2–4, 3–3			Danube Arena, Budapest; Referees: Michiel Zwart (NED), Sébastien Dervieux (FRA)
20 January 2020; 17:30	Report	Bychkov 5	Goals	Baraldi, Jelaca 3	Danube Arena, Budapest; Referees: Michiel Zwart (NED), Sébastien Dervieux (FRA)

20 January 2020; 19:00	Report	Romania	7–14	Greece	Danube Arena, Budapest; Referees: Sergey Naumov (RUS), Raffaele Colombo (ITA)
20 January 2020; 19:00	Report	Score by quarters: 3–1, 2–3, 0–6, 2–4			Danube Arena, Budapest; Referees: Sergey Naumov (RUS), Raffaele Colombo (ITA)
20 January 2020; 19:00	Report	Negrean 2	Goals	Genidounias 6	Danube Arena, Budapest; Referees: Sergey Naumov (RUS), Raffaele Colombo (ITA)

=== Quarterfinals ===
22 January 2020; 16:00	Report	Italy	8–10	Montenegro	Danube Arena, Budapest; Referees: Michiel Zwart (NED), Georgios Stavridis (GRE)
22 January 2020; 16:00	Report	Score by quarters: 3–3, 3–4, 1–2, 1–1			Danube Arena, Budapest; Referees: Michiel Zwart (NED), Georgios Stavridis (GRE)
22 January 2020; 16:00	Report	Figari 2	Goals	Petković 4	Danube Arena, Budapest; Referees: Michiel Zwart (NED), Georgios Stavridis (GRE)

22 January 2020; 17:30	Report	Serbia	9–10 (PSO)	Spain	Danube Arena, Budapest; Referees: Adrian Alexandrescu (ROU), Raffaele Colombo (ITA)
22 January 2020; 17:30	Report	Score by quarters: 2–1, 1–4, 2–1, 1–0 PSO: 3–4			Danube Arena, Budapest; Referees: Adrian Alexandrescu (ROU), Raffaele Colombo (ITA)
22 January 2020; 17:30	Report	Mandić 3	Goals	Perrone, Sanahuja 2	Danube Arena, Budapest; Referees: Adrian Alexandrescu (ROU), Raffaele Colombo (ITA)

22 January 2020; 19:00	Report	Hungary	14–10	Russia	Danube Arena, Budapest; Referees: Radosław Koryzna (POL), Matan Schwartz (ISR)
22 January 2020; 19:00	Report	Score by quarters: 3–2, 3–3, 4–3, 4–2			Danube Arena, Budapest; Referees: Radosław Koryzna (POL), Matan Schwartz (ISR)
22 January 2020; 19:00	Report	Manhercz, Varga 3	Goals	Kiselev, Merkulov 3	Danube Arena, Budapest; Referees: Radosław Koryzna (POL), Matan Schwartz (ISR)

22 January 2020; 20:30	Report	Croatia	14–11	Greece	Danube Arena, Budapest; Referees: Boris Margeta (SLO), Sébastien Dervieux (FRA)
22 January 2020; 20:30	Report	Score by quarters: 6–3, 4–3, 3–3, 1–2			Danube Arena, Budapest; Referees: Boris Margeta (SLO), Sébastien Dervieux (FRA)
22 January 2020; 20:30	Report	Joković 4	Goals	Vlachopoulos 3	Danube Arena, Budapest; Referees: Boris Margeta (SLO), Sébastien Dervieux (FRA)

=== 13–16th place semifinals ===
20 January 2020; 11:30	Report	Slovakia	8–4	Malta	Danube Arena, Budapest; Referees: Adrian Alexandrescu (ROU), György Kun (HUN)
20 January 2020; 11:30	Report	Score by quarters: 3–1, 2–1, 1–2, 2–0			Danube Arena, Budapest; Referees: Adrian Alexandrescu (ROU), György Kun (HUN)
20 January 2020; 11:30	Report	Zaťovič 4	Goals	S. Camilleri 4	Danube Arena, Budapest; Referees: Adrian Alexandrescu (ROU), György Kun (HUN)

20 January 2020; 13:00	Report	Netherlands	8–9	France	Danube Arena, Budapest; Referees: Giuliana Nicolosi (ITA), Ivan Raković (SRB)
20 January 2020; 13:00	Report	Score by quarters: 3–3, 2–2, 1–2, 2–2			Danube Arena, Budapest; Referees: Giuliana Nicolosi (ITA), Ivan Raković (SRB)
20 January 2020; 13:00	Report	Gottemaker, Winkelhorst 2	Goals	Marzouki 4	Danube Arena, Budapest; Referees: Giuliana Nicolosi (ITA), Ivan Raković (SRB)

=== 9–12th place semifinals ===
22 January 2020; 13:00	Report	Turkey	6–12	Georgia	Danube Arena, Budapest; Referees: Carlos Ortega (ESP), Sergey Naumov (RUS)
22 January 2020; 13:00	Report	Score by quarters: 1–4, 2–2, 1–4, 2–2			Danube Arena, Budapest; Referees: Carlos Ortega (ESP), Sergey Naumov (RUS)
22 January 2020; 13:00	Report	Acar, Yenigün 2	Goals	Bagaturia, Bitadze 3	Danube Arena, Budapest; Referees: Carlos Ortega (ESP), Sergey Naumov (RUS)

22 January 2020; 14:30	Report	Germany	15–10	Romania	Danube Arena, Budapest; Referees: Veselin Mišković (MNE), György Kun (HUN)
22 January 2020; 14:30	Report	Score by quarters: 5–1, 2–5, 5–1, 3–3			Danube Arena, Budapest; Referees: Veselin Mišković (MNE), György Kun (HUN)
22 January 2020; 14:30	Report	Stamm, Strelezkij 4	Goals	three players 2	Danube Arena, Budapest; Referees: Veselin Mišković (MNE), György Kun (HUN)

=== 5–8th place semifinals ===
24 January 2020; 14:30	Report	Italy	14–12	Russia	Danube Arena, Budapest; Referees: Levan Berishvili (GEO), Sébastien Dervieux (FRA)
24 January 2020; 14:30	Report	Score by quarters: 5–3, 4–4, 3–1, 2–4			Danube Arena, Budapest; Referees: Levan Berishvili (GEO), Sébastien Dervieux (FRA)
24 January 2020; 14:30	Report	Aicardi 3	Goals	Bychkov, Kharkov 3	Danube Arena, Budapest; Referees: Levan Berishvili (GEO), Sébastien Dervieux (FRA)

24 January 2020; 16:00	Report	Serbia	12–9	Greece	Danube Arena, Budapest; Referees: Radosław Koryzna (POL), Carlos Ortega (ESP)
24 January 2020; 16:00	Report	Score by quarters: 3–3, 3–2, 4–2, 2–2			Danube Arena, Budapest; Referees: Radosław Koryzna (POL), Carlos Ortega (ESP)
24 January 2020; 16:00	Report	Dedović, S. Mitrović 3	Goals	Vlachopoulos 3	Danube Arena, Budapest; Referees: Radosław Koryzna (POL), Carlos Ortega (ESP)

=== Semifinals ===
24 January 2020; 17:30	Report	Croatia	8–9	Spain	Danube Arena, Budapest; Referees: Boris Margeta (SLO), Sergey Naumov (RUS)
24 January 2020; 17:30	Report	Score by quarters: 1–0, 3–4, 2–2, 2–3			Danube Arena, Budapest; Referees: Boris Margeta (SLO), Sergey Naumov (RUS)
24 January 2020; 17:30	Report	Munarriz 3	Goals	Bukić 2	Danube Arena, Budapest; Referees: Boris Margeta (SLO), Sergey Naumov (RUS)

24 January 2020; 19:00	Report	Montenegro	8–10	Hungary	Danube Arena, Budapest; Referees: Adrian Alexandrescu (ROU), Raffaele Colombo (ITA)
24 January 2020; 19:00	Report	Score by quarters: 2–1, 1–3, 2–4, 3–2			Danube Arena, Budapest; Referees: Adrian Alexandrescu (ROU), Raffaele Colombo (ITA)
24 January 2020; 19:00	Report	Radović 3	Goals	Varga 4	Danube Arena, Budapest; Referees: Adrian Alexandrescu (ROU), Raffaele Colombo (ITA)

=== 15th place game ===
22 January 2020; 10:00	Report	Malta	9–19	Netherlands	Danube Arena, Budapest; Referees: Robert Tiozzo (CRO), Levan Berishvili (GEO)
22 January 2020; 10:00	Report	Score by quarters: 2–5, 2–5, 2–4, 3–5			Danube Arena, Budapest; Referees: Robert Tiozzo (CRO), Levan Berishvili (GEO)
22 January 2020; 10:00	Report	S. Camilleri 5	Goals	Van Yperen 6	Danube Arena, Budapest; Referees: Robert Tiozzo (CRO), Levan Berishvili (GEO)

=== 13th place game ===
22 January 2020; 11:30	Report	Slovakia	6–9	France	Danube Arena, Budapest; Referees: Gernot Häntschel (GER), Ivan Raković (SRB)
22 January 2020; 11:30	Report	Score by quarters: 0–2, 1–4, 3–1, 2–2			Danube Arena, Budapest; Referees: Gernot Häntschel (GER), Ivan Raković (SRB)
22 January 2020; 11:30	Report	Mare. Tkáč 2	Goals	Kalinić 3	Danube Arena, Budapest; Referees: Gernot Häntschel (GER), Ivan Raković (SRB)

=== Eleventh place game ===
24 January 2020; 11:30	Report	Turkey	3–20	Romania	Danube Arena, Budapest; Referees: Luis Santos (POR), Róbert Horváth (SVK)
24 January 2020; 11:30	Report	Score by quarters: 1–5, 0–6, 1–6, 1–3			Danube Arena, Budapest; Referees: Luis Santos (POR), Róbert Horváth (SVK)
24 January 2020; 11:30	Report	three players 1	Goals	Fulea 5	Danube Arena, Budapest; Referees: Luis Santos (POR), Róbert Horváth (SVK)

=== Ninth place game ===
24 January 2020; 13:00	Report	Georgia	8–9	Germany	Danube Arena, Budapest; Referees: György Kun (HUN), Matan Schwartz (ISR)
24 January 2020; 13:00	Report	Score by quarters: 3–2, 2–0, 2–3, 1–4			Danube Arena, Budapest; Referees: György Kun (HUN), Matan Schwartz (ISR)
24 January 2020; 13:00	Report	Vapenski 2	Goals	three players 2	Danube Arena, Budapest; Referees: György Kun (HUN), Matan Schwartz (ISR)

=== Seventh place game ===
26 January 2020; 14:30	Report	Russia	9–11	Greece	Danube Arena, Budapest; Referees: Robert Tiozzo (CRO), Carlos Ortega (ESP)
26 January 2020; 14:30	Report	Score by quarters: 2–2, 2–3, 3–3, 2–3			Danube Arena, Budapest; Referees: Robert Tiozzo (CRO), Carlos Ortega (ESP)
26 January 2020; 14:30	Report	Kharkov 4	Goals	Argyropoulos 3	Danube Arena, Budapest; Referees: Robert Tiozzo (CRO), Carlos Ortega (ESP)

=== Fifth place game ===
26 January 2020; 16:00	Report	Italy	7–8	Serbia	Danube Arena, Budapest; Referees: Michiel Zwart (NED), György Kun (HUN)
26 January 2020; 16:00	Report	Score by quarters: 2–3, 4–1, 0–2, 1–2			Danube Arena, Budapest; Referees: Michiel Zwart (NED), György Kun (HUN)
26 January 2020; 16:00	Report	Di Fulvio 3	Goals	Aleksić, Filipović 2	Danube Arena, Budapest; Referees: Michiel Zwart (NED), György Kun (HUN)

=== Third place game ===
26 January 2020; 17:30	Report	Montenegro	10–9	Croatia	Danube Arena, Budapest; Referees: Sergey Naumov (RUS), Raffaele Colombo (ITA)
26 January 2020; 17:30	Report	Score by quarters: 1–3, 2–4, 4–1, 3–1			Danube Arena, Budapest; Referees: Sergey Naumov (RUS), Raffaele Colombo (ITA)
26 January 2020; 17:30	Report	Ivović 5	Goals	three players 2	Danube Arena, Budapest; Referees: Sergey Naumov (RUS), Raffaele Colombo (ITA)

=== Final ===
26 January 2020; 19:00	Report	Hungary	14–13 (PSO)	Spain	Danube Arena, Budapest; Attendance: 6,600; Referees: Boris Margeta (SLO), Georgios Stavridis (GRE)
26 January 2020; 19:00	Report	Score by quarters: 1–3, 3–0, 2–2, 3–4 PSO: 5–4			Danube Arena, Budapest; Attendance: 6,600; Referees: Boris Margeta (SLO), Georgios Stavridis (GRE)
26 January 2020; 19:00	Report	three players 2	Goals	Munarriz 3	Danube Arena, Budapest; Attendance: 6,600; Referees: Boris Margeta (SLO), Georgios Stavridis (GRE)

== Final standing ==
Qualified for the 2020 Summer Olympics
Qualified for the 2020 Summer Olympics World qualification tournament

Rank	Team
1st place, gold medalist(s)	Hungary
2nd place, silver medalist(s)	Spain^{3}
3rd place, bronze medalist(s)	Montenegro
4	Croatia
5	Serbia^{1}
6	Italy^{2}
7	Greece
8	Russia
9	Germany
10	Georgia
11	Romania
12	Turkey
13	France
14	Slovakia
15	Netherlands^{4}
16	Malta

- ^{1} Serbia qualified for the 2020 Summer Olympics as the winner of 2019 World League
- ^{2} Italy qualified for the 2020 Summer Olympics as the winner of 2019 World Championships
- ^{3} Spain qualified for the 2020 Summer Olympics as the runners-up of 2019 World Championships
- ^{4} The Netherlands qualified for the 2020 Summer Olympics World qualification tournament as the host of the tournament

== Statistics and awards ==
=== Top goalscorers ===
Rank	Name	Team	Goals	Shots	%
1	Konstantin Kharkov	Russia	21	32	66
2	Alberto Munarriz	Spain	20	43	47
3	Álvaro Granados	Spain	18	40	45
4	Konstantinos Genidounias	Greece	17	38	45
4	Dénes Varga	Hungary	17	30	57
6	Felipe Perrone	Spain	16	32	50
6	Gergő Zalánki	Hungary	16	27	59
8	Aleksandar Ivović	Montenegro	16	43	35
8	Angelos Vlachopoulos	Greece	16	37	41
10	Dušan Mandić	Serbia	14	29	48

Source: wp2020budapest.microplustiming.com

=== Top goalkeepers ===
Rank	Name	Team	Saves	Shots	%
1	Daniel López	Spain	60	108	56
2	Moritz Schenkel	Germany	56	113	50
3	Tomáš Hoferica	Slovakia	52	95	55
4	Dejan Lazović	Montenegro	50	91	55
5	Marco Del Lungo	Italy	47	92	51
6	Eelco Wagenaar	Netherlands	46	90	51
7	Marko Bijač	Croatia	45	81	56
8	Marius Tic	Romania	42	105	40
9	Irakli Razmadze	Georgia	39	87	45
10	Emmanouil Zerdevas	Greece	38	87	44

Source: wp2020budapest.microplustiming.com

=== Awards ===
The awards were announced on 26 January 2020.

Award	Player
Most Valuable Player	(Hungary) Dénes Varga
Best Goalkeeper	(Spain) Daniel López
Topscorer	(Russia) Konstantin Kharkov (21 goals)
