= Mehdi Marzouki =

French water polo player (born 1988)

Mehdi Thomas Marzouki
Personal information
- Born: 26 May 1987 (age 39)
- Height: 192 cm (6 ft 4 in)
- Weight: 103 kg (227 lb)

Sport
- Sport: Water polo
- Club: Spandau 04

Mehdi Marzouki (born 16 May 1988) is a water polo player from France. He was part of the French team at the 2016 Summer Olympics, where the team was eliminated in the group stage.
