= List of world champions in men's water polo =

This is a list of world champions in men's water polo since the inaugural official edition in 1973.

== Abbreviations ==
| # | Ordering by name or by tournament | Cap No. | Cap number | Rk | Rank |
| (C) | Captain | L/R | Handedness | Ref | Reference |
| Pos | Playing position | FP | Field player | GK | Goalkeeper |
| CB | Center back | CF | Center forward | D | Driver |
| ISHOF | International Swimming Hall of Fame | p. | page | pp. | pages |

== History ==
The 1973 Men's World Water Polo Championship was the first edition of the men's water polo tournament at the World Aquatics Championships, organized by the world governing body in aquatics, the FINA.

As of 2025, men's water polo teams from eight European countries won all 22 tournaments.

Spain is current world champion.

Legend

- D – Debut
- C – Champion
- C – Winning streak (winning three or more world championships in a row)
- – Hosts
- ^{†} – Defunct team

| Champion | 1973 | 1975 | 1978 | 1982 | 1986 | 1991 | 1994 | 1998 | 2001 | 2003 | 2005 | 2007 | 2009 | 2011 | 2013 | 2015 | 2017 | 2019 | 2022 | 2023 | 2024 | 2025 | Total |
|---|---|---|---|---|---|---|---|---|---|---|---|---|---|---|---|---|---|---|---|---|---|---|---|
| Croatia | Part of Yugoslavia^{†} | | | | | | D | | | | | C | | | | | C | | | | C | | 3 |
| Hungary | C | | | | | | | | | C | | | | | C | | | | | C | | | 4 |
| Italy | D | | C | | | | C | | | | | | | C | | | | C | | | | | 4 |
| Serbia | Part of Yugoslavia^{†}, then of FR Yugoslavia^{†}, and Serbia and Montenegro^{†} (Note: After the breakup of Yugoslavia, FR Yugoslavia men's national water polo team participated at the 1998 and 2001 World Aquatics Championships. In 2003, after the country was renamed from FR Yugoslavia to Serbia and Montenegro, the team was also renamed to Serbia and Montenegro men's national water polo team.) | | | | | | | | | | | D | C | | | C | | | | | | | 2 |
| Serbia and Montenegro^{†} | Part of Yugoslavia^{†} | | | | | | | D | | | C | Defunct | | | | | | | | | | | 1 |
| Soviet Union^{†} | D | C | | C | | | Defunct | | | | | | | | | | | | | | | | 2 |
| Spain | D | | | | | | | C | C | | | | | | | | | | C | | | C | 4 |
| Yugoslavia^{†} | D | | | | C | C | Defunct | | | | | | | | | | | | | | | | 2 |
| Champion | 1973 | 1975 | 1978 | 1982 | 1986 | 1991 | 1994 | 1998 | 2001 | 2003 | 2005 | 2007 | 2009 | 2011 | 2013 | 2015 | 2017 | 2019 | 2022 | 2023 | 2024 | 2025 | (22) |

== Team statistics ==
=== Results ===
The following table shows results of world champions in men's water polo by tournament.

Legend

- 6 – Winning 6 matches during the tournament
- 4 – Drawing 4 matches during the tournament
- 2 – Losing 2 matches during the tournament
- 100.0% – Winning all matches during the tournament
- team – Winning streak (winning three or more world championships in a row)
- – Host team
- ^{†} – Defunct team

Abbreviation

- MP – Matches played
- W – Won
- D – Drawn
- L – Lost
- GF – Goals for
- GA – Goals against
- GD – Goals difference
- GF/MP – Goals for per match
- GA/MP – Goals against per match
- GD/MP – Goals difference per match

Results of champions by tournament
| # | Men's tournament | Champion | MP | W | D | L | Win % | GF | GA | GD | GF/MP | GA/MP | GD/MP |
|---|---|---|---|---|---|---|---|---|---|---|---|---|---|
| 1 | Belgrade 1973 | Hungary (1st title) | 8 | 7 | 1 | 0 | 87.5% | 58 | 24 | 34 | 7.250 | 3.000 | 4.250 |
| 2 | Cali 1975 | Soviet Union^{†} (1st title) | 8 | 6 | 2 | 0 | 75.0% | 49 | 26 | 23 | 6.125 | 3.250 | 2.875 |
| 3 | West Berlin 1978 | Italy (1st title) | 8 | 5 | 3 | 0 | 62.5% | 41 | 31 | 10 | 5.125 | 3.875 | 1.250 |
| 4 | Guayaquil 1982 | Soviet Union^{†} (2nd title) | 7 | 6 | 1 | 0 | 85.7% | 68 | 41 | 27 | 9.714 | 5.857 | 3.857 |
| 5 | Madrid 1986 | Yugoslavia^{†} (1st title) | 6 | 5 | 1 | 0 | 83.3% | 61 | 43 | 18 | 10.167 | 7.167 | 3.000 |
| 6 | Perth 1991 | Yugoslavia^{†} (2nd title) | 7 | 6 | 0 | 1 | 85.7% | 81 | 46 | 35 | 11.571 | 6.571 | 5.000 |
| 7 | Rome 1994 | Italy (2nd title) | 7 | 7 | 0 | 0 | 100.0% | 65 | 39 | 26 | 9.286 | 5.571 | 3.714 |
| 8 | Perth 1998 | Spain (1st title) | 8 | 8 | 0 | 0 | 100.0% | 65 | 35 | 30 | 8.125 | 4.375 | 3.750 |
| 9 | Fukuoka 2001 | Spain (2nd title) | 8 | 8 | 0 | 0 | 100.0% | 63 | 27 | 36 | 7.875 | 3.375 | 4.500 |
| 10 | Barcelona 2003 | Hungary (2nd title) | 6 | 5 | 1 | 0 | 83.3% | 62 | 37 | 25 | 10.333 | 6.167 | 4.167 |
| 11 | Montreal 2005 | Serbia and Montenegro^{†} (1st title) | 6 | 6 | 0 | 0 | 100.0% | 69 | 29 | 40 | 11.500 | 4.833 | 6.667 |
| 12 | Melbourne 2007 | Croatia (1st title) | 6 | 6 | 0 | 0 | 100.0% | 65 | 40 | 25 | 10.833 | 6.667 | 4.167 |
| 13 | Rome 2009 | Serbia (1st title) | 7 | 5 | 1 | 1 | 71.4% | 80 | 60 | 20 | 11.429 | 8.571 | 2.857 |
| 14 | Shanghai 2011 | Italy (3rd title) | 6 | 6 | 0 | 0 | 100.0% | 59 | 33 | 26 | 9.833 | 5.500 | 4.333 |
| 15 | Barcelona 2013 | Hungary (3rd title) | 7 | 5 | 1 | 1 | 71.4% | 76 | 54 | 22 | 10.857 | 7.714 | 3.143 |
| 16 | Kazan 2015 | Serbia (2nd title) | 6 | 6 | 0 | 0 | 100.0% | 73 | 43 | 30 | 12.167 | 7.167 | 5.000 |
| 17 | Budapest 2017 | Croatia (2nd title) | 6 | 6 | 0 | 0 | 100.0% | 70 | 47 | 23 | 11.667 | 7.833 | 3.833 |
| 18 | Gwangju 2019 | Italy (4th title) | 6 | 6 | 0 | 0 | 100.0% | 60 | 40 | 20 | 10.000 | 6.667 | 3.333 |
| 19 | Budapest 2022 | Spain (3rd title) | 5 | 4 | 1 | 0 | 80.0% | 68 | 34 | 34 | 13.600 | 6.800 | 6.800 |
| 20 | Fukuoka 2023 | Hungary (4th title) | 6 | 5 | 1 | 0 | 83.3% | 84 | 64 | 20 | 14.000 | 10.667 | 3.333 |
| 21 | Doha 2024 | Croatia (3rd title) | 7 | 4 | 2 | 1 | 57.1% | 107 | 63 | 44 | 15.286 | 9.000 | 6.286 |
| 22 | Singapore 2025 | Spain (4th title) | 6 | 5 | 1 | 0 | 83.3% | 78 | 57 | 21 | 13.000 | 9.500 | 3.500 |
| # | Men's tournament | Total | 147 | 127 | 16 | 4 | 86.4% | 1502 | 913 | 589 | 10.218 | 6.211 | 4.007 |
| # | Men's tournament | Champion | MP | W | D | L | Win % | GF | GA | GD | GF/MP | GA/MP | GD/MP |

Sources:

- Official Reports (FINA) (PDF): "World Championship" (p. 15);
- Todor66: "Men's Water Polo World Championship".

The following table shows men's teams that won all matches during the tournament.

Winning all matches during the tournament
| # | Year | Champion | MP | W | D | L | Win % |
|---|---|---|---|---|---|---|---|
| 1 | 1994 | Italy (2nd title) | 7 | 7 | 0 | 0 | 100.0% |
| 2 | 1998 | Spain (1st title) | 8 | 8 | 0 | 0 | 100.0% |
| 3 | 2001 | Spain (2nd title) | 8 | 8 | 0 | 0 | 100.0% |
| 4 | 2005 | Serbia and Montenegro^{†} (1st title) | 6 | 6 | 0 | 0 | 100.0% |
| 5 | 2007 | Croatia (1st title) | 6 | 6 | 0 | 0 | 100.0% |
| 6 | 2011 | Italy (3rd title) | 6 | 6 | 0 | 0 | 100.0% |
| 7 | 2015 | Serbia (2nd title) | 6 | 6 | 0 | 0 | 100.0% |
| 8 | 2017 | Croatia (2nd title) | 6 | 6 | 0 | 0 | 100.0% |
| 9 | 2019 | Italy (4th title) | 6 | 6 | 0 | 0 | 100.0% |
| # | Year | Champion | MP | W | D | L | Win % |

The following tables show records of goals for per match.

Top 5 most goals for per match
| Rk | Year | Champion | MP | GF | GF/MP |
|---|---|---|---|---|---|
| 1 | 2024 | Croatia (3rd title) | 7 | 107 | 15.286 |
| 2 | 2023 | Hungary (4th title) | 6 | 84 | 14.000 |
| 3 | 2022 | Spain (3rd title) | 5 | 68 | 13.600 |
| 4 | 2025 | Spain (4th title) | 6 | 78 | 13.000 |
| 5 | 2015 | Serbia (2nd title) | 6 | 73 | 12.167 |

Top 5 fewest goals for per match
| Rk | Year | Champion | MP | GF | GF/MP |
|---|---|---|---|---|---|
| 1 | 1978 | Italy (1st title) | 8 | 41 | 5.125 |
| 2 | 1975 | Soviet Union^{†} (1st title) | 8 | 49 | 6.125 |
| 3 | 1973 | Hungary (1st title) | 8 | 58 | 7.250 |
| 4 | 2001 | Spain (2nd title) | 8 | 63 | 7.875 |
| 5 | 1998 | Spain (1st title) | 8 | 65 | 8.125 |

Historical progression of records – goals for per match
| Goals for per match | Achievement | Year | Champion | Date of winning gold | Duration of record |
|---|---|---|---|---|---|
| 7.250 | Set record | 1973 | Hungary (1st title) | 9 September 1973 | 8 years, 332 days |
| 9.714 | Broke record | 1982 | Soviet Union^{†} (2nd title) | 7 August 1982 | 4 years, 15 days |
| 10.167 | Broke record | 1986 | Yugoslavia^{†} (1st title) | 22 August 1986 | 4 years, 144 days |
| 11.571 | Broke record | 1991 | Yugoslavia^{†} (2nd title) | 13 January 1991 | 24 years, 207 days |
| 12.167 | Broke record | 2015 | Serbia (2nd title) | 8 August 2015 | 6 years, 329 days |
| 13.600 | Broke record | 2022 | Spain (3rd title) | 3 July 2022 | 1 year, 26 days |
| 14.000 | Broke record | 2023 | Hungary (4th title) | 29 July 2023 | 203 days |
| 15.286 | Broke record | 2024 | Croatia (3rd title) | 17 February 2024 | 2 years, 71 days |

The following tables show records of goals against per match.

Top 5 most goals against per match
| Rk | Year | Champion | MP | GA | GA/MP |
|---|---|---|---|---|---|
| 1 | 2023 | Hungary (4th title) | 6 | 64 | 10.667 |
| 2 | 2025 | Spain (3rd title) | 6 | 57 | 9.500 |
| 3 | 2024 | Croatia (3rd title) | 7 | 63 | 9.000 |
| 4 | 2009 | Serbia (1st title) | 7 | 60 | 8.571 |
| 5 | 2017 | Croatia (2nd title) | 6 | 47 | 7.833 |

Top 5 fewest goals against per match
| Rk | Year | Champion | MP | GA | GA/MP |
|---|---|---|---|---|---|
| 1 | 1973 | Hungary (1st title) | 8 | 24 | 3.000 |
| 2 | 1975 | Soviet Union^{†} (1st title) | 8 | 26 | 3.250 |
| 3 | 2001 | Spain (2nd title) | 8 | 27 | 3.375 |
| 4 | 1978 | Italy (1st title) | 8 | 31 | 3.875 |
| 5 | 1998 | Spain (1st title) | 8 | 35 | 4.375 |

The following tables show records of goals difference per match.

Top 5 most goals difference per match
| Rk | Year | Champion | MP | GD | GD/MP |
|---|---|---|---|---|---|
| 1 | 2022 | Spain (3rd title) | 5 | 34 | 6.800 |
| 2 | 2005 | Serbia and Montenegro^{†} (1st title) | 6 | 40 | 6.667 |
| 3 | 2024 | Croatia (3rd title) | 7 | 44 | 6.286 |
| 4 | 1991 | Yugoslavia^{†} (2nd title) | 7 | 35 | 5.000 |
| 4 | 2015 | Serbia (2nd title) | 6 | 30 | 5.000 |

Top 5 fewest goals difference per match
| Rk | Year | Champion | MP | GD | GD/MP |
|---|---|---|---|---|---|
| 1 | 1978 | Italy (1st title) | 8 | 10 | 1.250 |
| 2 | 2009 | Serbia (1st title) | 7 | 20 | 2.857 |
| 3 | 1975 | Soviet Union^{†} (1st title) | 8 | 23 | 2.875 |
| 4 | 1986 | Yugoslavia^{†} (1st title) | 6 | 18 | 3.000 |
| 5 | 2013 | Hungary (3rd title) | 7 | 22 | 3.143 |

=== Olympic and world champions (teams) ===
The following table is pre-sorted by number of Olympic titles (in descending order), number of world titles (in descending order), name of the team (in ascending order), respectively. Last updated: 24 July 2025.

As of the 2020 Summer Olympics, there are seven men's national water polo teams that won gold medals at the Summer Olympics and the World Aquatics Championships.

Legend

- Year^{*} – As host team
- Team^{†} – Defunct team

| # | Champions | Olympic title | World title | Total | First | Last |
|---|---|---|---|---|---|---|
| 1 | Hungary | 9 (1932–1936, 1952–1956, 1964, 1976, 2000–2004–2008) | 4 (1973, 2003, 2013, 2023) | 13 | 1932 | 2023 |
| 2 | Italy | 3 (1948, 1960^{*}, 1992) | 4 (1978, 1994^{*}, 2011, 2019) | 7 | 1948 | 2019 |
| 3 | Serbia | 3 (2016–2020–2024) | 2 (2009, 2015) | 5 | 2009 | 2024 |
| 3 | Yugoslavia^{†} | 3 (1968, 1984–1988) | 2 (1986–1991) | 5 | 1968 | 1991 |
| 5 | Soviet Union^{†} | 2 (1972, 1980^{*}) | 2 (1975, 1982) | 4 | 1972 | 1982 |
| 6 | Spain | 1 (1996) | 4 (1998–2001, 2022, 2025) | 5 | 1996 | 2025 |
| 7 | Croatia | 1 (2012) | 3 (2007, 2017, 2024) | 4 | 2007 | 2024 |

== Player statistics ==
=== Age records ===
The following tables show the oldest and youngest male world champions in water polo.

Legend

- – Host team

Top 10 oldest male world champions in water polo
| Rk | Player | Age of winning gold | Men's team | Pos | Date of birth | Date of winning gold |
|---|---|---|---|---|---|---|
| 1 | Felipe Perrone | 39 years, 147 days | Spain | FP | 27 February 1986 | 24 July 2025 |
| 2 | Josip Vrlić | 37 years, 298 days | Croatia | FP | 25 April 1986 | 17 February 2024 |
| 3 | Luka Lončar | 36 years, 236 days | Croatia | FP | 26 June 1987 | 17 February 2024 |
| 4 | Felipe Perrone | 36 years, 126 days | Spain | FP | 27 February 1986 | 3 July 2022 |
| 5 | Dénes Varga | 36 years, 122 days | Hungary | FP | 29 March 1987 | 29 July 2023 |
| 6 | Manuel Estiarte | 36 years, 84 days | Spain | FP | 26 October 1961 | 18 January 1998 |
| 7 | Zdeslav Vrdoljak | 36 years, 17 days | Croatia | FP | 15 March 1971 | 1 April 2007 |
| 8 | Amaurys Pérez | 35 years, 134 days | Italy | FP | 18 March 1976 | 30 July 2011 |
| 9 | Pietro Figlioli | 35 years, 59 days | Italy | FP | 29 May 1984 | 27 July 2019 |
| 10 | Ivan Krapić | 35 years, 3 days | Croatia | FP | 14 February 1989 | 17 February 2024 |
| Rk | Player | Age of winning gold | Men's team | Pos | Date of birth | Date of winning gold |

Top 10 youngest male world champions in water polo
| Rk | Player | Age of winning gold | Men's team | Pos | Date of birth | Date of winning gold |
|---|---|---|---|---|---|---|
| 1 | Guillermo Molina | 17 years, 135 days | Spain | FP | 16 March 1984 | 29 July 2001 |
| 2 | Mirko Vičević | 18 years, 53 days | Yugoslavia | FP | 30 June 1968 | 22 August 1986 |
| 3 | Nikola Jakšić | 18 years, 203 days | Serbia | FP | 17 January 1997 | 8 August 2015 |
| 4 | Aleksey Vdovin | 19 years, 51 days | Soviet Union | FP | 17 June 1963 | 7 August 1982 |
| 5 | Biel Gomila | 19 years, 150 days | Spain | FP | 24 February 2006 | 24 July 2025 |
| 6 | Maro Joković | 19 years, 182 days | Croatia | FP | 1 October 1987 | 1 April 2007 |
| 7 | Dubravko Šimenc | 19 years, 293 days | Yugoslavia | FP | 2 November 1966 | 22 August 1986 |
| 8 | Unai Aguirre | 19 years, 354 days | Spain | GK | 14 July 2002 | 3 July 2022 |
| 9 | Erik Molnár | 20 years, 35 days | Hungary | FP | 24 June 2003 | 29 July 2023 |
| 10 | Vince Vigvári | 20 years, 36 days | Hungary | FP | 23 June 2003 | 29 July 2023 |
| Rk | Player | Age of winning gold | Men's team | Pos | Date of birth | Date of winning gold |

=== Multiple gold medalists ===
The following tables are pre-sorted by date of receiving the last gold medal (in ascending order), date of receiving the first gold medal (in ascending order), name of the player (in ascending order), respectively.

There is only one male athlete who won three gold medals in water polo at the World Aquatics Championships.

Legend

- ^{*} – Host team

Male athletes who won three gold medals in water polo at the World Aquatics Championships
| Year | Player | Date of birth | Height | Men's team | Pos | World titles | Age of first/last |
|---|---|---|---|---|---|---|---|
| 2015 | Slobodan Nikić | 25 January 1983 | 1.97 m (6 ft 6 in) | Serbia and Montenegro | FP | 2005 | 22/32 |
| 2015 | Slobodan Nikić | 25 January 1983 | 1.97 m (6 ft 6 in) | Serbia | FP | 2009, 2015 | 22/32 |

There are forty six male athletes who won two gold medals in water polo at the World Aquatics Championships.

Legend

- ^{*} – Host team

Male athletes who won two gold medals in water polo at the World Aquatics Championships
| Year | Player | Date of birth | Height | Men's team | Pos | World titles | Age of first/last |
|---|---|---|---|---|---|---|---|
| 1982 | Aleksandr Kabanov | 11 June 1948 | 1.81 m (5 ft 11 in) | Soviet Union | FP | 1975, 1982 | 27/34 |
| 1991 | Perica Bukić | 20 February 1966 | 1.98 m (6 ft 6 in) | Yugoslavia | FP | 1986–1991 | 20/24 |
| 1991 | Igor Milanović | 18 December 1965 | 1.95 m (6 ft 5 in) | Yugoslavia | FP | 1986–1991 | 20/25 |
| 1991 | Dubravko Šimenc | 2 November 1966 | 2.01 m (6 ft 7 in) | Yugoslavia | FP | 1986–1991 | 19/24 |
| 1991 | Anto Vasović | | | Yugoslavia | FP | 1986–1991 | |
| 1991 | Mirko Vičević | 30 June 1968 | 1.92 m (6 ft 4 in) | Yugoslavia | FP | 1986–1991 | 18/22 |
| 2001 | Daniel Ballart | 17 March 1973 | 1.78 m (5 ft 10 in) | Spain | FP | 1998–2001 | 24/28 |
| 2001 | Salvador Gómez | 11 March 1968 | 1.94 m (6 ft 4 in) | Spain | FP | 1998–2001 | 29/33 |
| 2001 | Gustavo Marcos | 23 December 1972 | 1.80 m (5 ft 11 in) | Spain | FP | 1998–2001 | 25/28 |
| 2001 | Iván Moro | 25 December 1974 | 1.86 m (6 ft 1 in) | Spain | FP | 1998–2001 | 23/26 |
| 2001 | Sergi Pedrerol | 16 December 1969 | 1.90 m (6 ft 3 in) | Spain | FP | 1998–2001 | 28/31 |
| 2001 | Iván Pérez | 29 June 1971 | 1.97 m (6 ft 6 in) | Spain | FP | 1998–2001 | 26/30 |
| 2001 | Jesús Rollán | 4 April 1968 | 1.87 m (6 ft 2 in) | Spain | GK | 1998–2001 | 29/33 |
| 2001 | Carles Sanz | 25 May 1975 | 1.77 m (5 ft 10 in) | Spain | FP | 1998–2001 | 22/26 |
| 2009 | Vanja Udovičić | 12 September 1982 | 1.93 m (6 ft 4 in) | Serbia and Montenegro | FP | 2005 | 22/26 |
| 2009 | Vanja Udovičić | 12 September 1982 | 1.93 m (6 ft 4 in) | Serbia | FP | 2009 | 22/26 |
| 2013 | Norbert Madaras | 1 December 1979 | 1.91 m (6 ft 3 in) | Hungary | FP | 2003, 2013 | 23/33 |
| 2015 | Milan Aleksić | 13 May 1986 | 1.92 m (6 ft 4 in) | Serbia | FP | 2009, 2015 | 23/29 |
| 2015 | Filip Filipović | 2 May 1987 | 1.96 m (6 ft 5 in) | Serbia | FP | 2009, 2015 | 22/28 |
| 2015 | Živko Gocić | 22 August 1982 | 1.93 m (6 ft 4 in) | Serbia | FP | 2009, 2015 | 26/32 |
| 2015 | Stefan Mitrović | 29 March 1988 | 1.95 m (6 ft 5 in) | Serbia | FP | 2009, 2015 | 21/27 |
| 2015 | Duško Pijetlović | 25 April 1985 | 1.97 m (6 ft 6 in) | Serbia | FP | 2009, 2015 | 24/30 |
| 2015 | Gojko Pijetlović | 7 August 1983 | 1.94 m (6 ft 4 in) | Serbia | GK | 2009, 2015 | 25/32 |
| 2015 | Andrija Prlainović | 28 April 1987 | 1.87 m (6 ft 2 in) | Serbia | FP | 2009, 2015 | 22/28 |
| 2017 | Andro Bušlje | 4 January 1986 | 2.00 m (6 ft 7 in) | Croatia | FP | 2007, 2017 | 21/31 |
| 2017 | Maro Joković | 1 October 1987 | 2.03 m (6 ft 8 in) | Croatia | FP | 2007, 2017 | 19/29 |
| 2019 | Matteo Aicardi | 19 April 1986 | 1.92 m (6 ft 4 in) | Italy | FP | 2011, 2019 | 25/33 |
| 2019 | Niccolò Figari | 24 January 1988 | 1.97 m (6 ft 6 in) | Italy | FP | 2011, 2019 | 23/31 |
| 2019 | Pietro Figlioli | 29 May 1984 | 1.92 m (6 ft 4 in) | Italy | FP | 2011, 2019 | 27/35 |
| 2023 | Márton Vámos | 24 June 1992 | 2.02 m (6 ft 8 in) | Hungary | FP | 2013, 2023 | 21/31 |
| 2023 | Dénes Varga | 29 March 1987 | 1.93 m (6 ft 4 in) | Hungary | FP | 2013, 2023 | 26/36 |
| 2024 | Marko Bijač | 12 January 1991 | 2.01 m (6 ft 7 in) | Croatia | GK | 2017, 2024 | 26/33 |
| 2024 | Loren Fatović | 16 November 1996 | 1.86 m (6 ft 1 in) | Croatia | FP | 2017, 2024 | 20/27 |
| 2024 | Ivan Krapić | 14 February 1989 | 1.94 m (6 ft 4 in) | Croatia | FP | 2017, 2024 | 28/35 |
| 2024 | Luka Lončar | 26 June 1987 | 1.95 m (6 ft 5 in) | Croatia | FP | 2017, 2024 | 30/36 |
| 2024 | Ante Vukičević | 24 February 1993 | 1.86 m (6 ft 1 in) | Croatia | FP | 2017, 2024 | 24/30 |
| 2025 | Unai Aguirre | 14 July 2002 | 1.92 m (6 ft 4 in) | Spain | GK | 2022, 2025 | 19/23 |
| 2025 | Alejandro Bustos | 17 March 1997 | 1.93 m (6 ft 4 in) | Spain | FP | 2022, 2025 | 25/28 |
| 2025 | Sergi Cabañas | 10 February 1996 | 1.91 m (6 ft 3 in) | Spain | FP | 2022, 2025 | 26/29 |
| 2025 | Miguel de Toro | 16 August 1993 | 2.02 m (6 ft 8 in) | Spain | FP | 2022, 2025 | 28/31 |
| 2025 | Álvaro Granados | 8 October 1998 | 1.92 m (6 ft 4 in) | Spain | FP | 2022, 2025 | 23/26 |
| 2025 | Marc Larumbe | 30 May 1994 | 1.93 m (6 ft 4 in) | Spain | FP | 2022, 2025 | 28/31 |
| 2025 | Eduardo Lorrio | 25 September 1993 | 1.93 m (6 ft 4 in) | Spain | GK | 2022, 2025 | 28/31 |
| 2025 | Alberto Munárriz | 19 May 1994 | 1.95 m (6 ft 5 in) | Spain | FP | 2022, 2025 | 28/31 |
| 2025 | Felipe Perrone | 27 February 1986 | 1.83 m (6 ft 0 in) | Spain | FP | 2022, 2025 | 36/39 |
| 2025 | Bernat Sanahuja | 21 October 2000 | 1.92 m (6 ft 4 in) | Spain | FP | 2022, 2025 | 21/24 |
| 2025 | Roger Tahull | 11 May 1997 | 1.95 m (6 ft 5 in) | Spain | FP | 2022, 2025 | 25/28 |
| Year | Player | Date of birth | Height | Men's team | Pos | World titles | Age of first/last |

=== Olympic and world champions (players) ===
The following tables are pre-sorted by number of Olympic titles (in descending order), number of world titles (in descending order), year of receiving the last gold medal (in ascending order), year of receiving the first gold medal (in ascending order), name of the player (in ascending order), respectively. Last updated: 11 August 2023.

As of the 2020 Summer Olympics, there are ninety-six male athletes who won gold medals in water polo at the Summer Olympics and the World Aquatics Championships.

Legend

- Year^{*} – As host team

Male water polo players who won three Olympic titles and one or more world titles
| # | Player | Birth | Height | Pos | Summer Olympics | | | World Aquatics Championships | | | Total titles | ISHOF member |
| # | Player | Birth | Height | Pos | Age | Men's team | Title | Age | Men's team | Title | Total titles | ISHOF member |
|---|---|---|---|---|---|---|---|---|---|---|---|---|
| 1 | Tibor Benedek | 1972 | 1.90 m (6 ft 3 in) | FP | 28–32–36 | Hungary | 2000–2004–2008 | 31 | Hungary | 2003 | 4 | 2016 |
| 1 | Péter Biros | 1976 | 1.94 m (6 ft 4 in) | FP | 24–28–32 | Hungary | 2000–2004–2008 | 27 | Hungary | 2003 | 4 | 2016 |
| 1 | Tamás Kásás | 1976 | 2.00 m (6 ft 7 in) | FP | 24–28–32 | Hungary | 2000–2004–2008 | 27 | Hungary | 2003 | 4 | 2016 |
| 1 | Gergely Kiss | 1977 | 1.99 m (6 ft 6 in) | FP | 23–26–30 | Hungary | 2000–2004–2008 | 25 | Hungary | 2003 | 4 | 2016 |
| 1 | Tamás Molnár | 1975 | 1.93 m (6 ft 4 in) | FP | 25–29–33 | Hungary | 2000–2004–2008 | 27 | Hungary | 2003 | 4 | 2016 |
| 1 | Zoltán Szécsi | 1977 | 1.98 m (6 ft 6 in) | GK | 22–26–30 | Hungary | 2000–2004–2008 | 25 | Hungary | 2003 | 4 | 2016 |

Male water polo players who won two Olympic titles and two or more world titles
| # | Player | Birth | Height | Pos | Summer Olympics | | | World Aquatics Championships | | | Total titles | ISHOF member |
| # | Player | Birth | Height | Pos | Age | Men's team | Title | Age | Men's team | Title | Total titles | ISHOF member |
|---|---|---|---|---|---|---|---|---|---|---|---|---|
| 7 | Aleksandr Kabanov | 1948 | 1.81 m (5 ft 11 in) | FP | 24, 32 | Soviet Union | 1972, 1980^{*} | 27, 34 | Soviet Union | 1975, 1982 | 4 | 2001 |
| 8 | Perica Bukić | 1966 | 1.98 m (6 ft 6 in) | FP | 18–22 | Yugoslavia | 1984–1988 | 20–24 | Yugoslavia | 1986–1991 | 4 | 2008 |
| 8 | Igor Milanović | 1965 | 1.95 m (6 ft 5 in) | FP | 18–22 | Yugoslavia | 1984–1988 | 20–25 | Yugoslavia | 1986–1991 | 4 | 2006 |
| 10 | Norbert Madaras | 1979 | 1.91 m (6 ft 3 in) | FP | 24–28 | Hungary | 2004–2008 | 23, 33 | Hungary | 2003, 2013 | 4 | |
| 11 | Milan Aleksić | 1986 | 1.93 m (6 ft 4 in) | FP | 30–35 | Serbia | 2016–2020 | 23, 29 | Serbia | 2009, 2015 | 4 | |
| 11 | Filip Filipović | 1987 | 1.96 m (6 ft 5 in) | FP | 29–34 | Serbia | 2016–2020 | 22, 28 | Serbia | 2009, 2015 | 4 | |
| 11 | Stefan Mitrović | 1988 | 1.95 m (6 ft 5 in) | FP | 28–33 | Serbia | 2016–2020 | 21, 27 | Serbia | 2009, 2015 | 4 | |
| 11 | Duško Pijetlović | 1985 | 1.97 m (6 ft 6 in) | FP | 31–36 | Serbia | 2016–2020 | 24, 30 | Serbia | 2009, 2015 | 4 | |
| 11 | Gojko Pijetlović | 1983 | 1.94 m (6 ft 4 in) | GK | 33–38 | Serbia | 2016–2020 | 25, 32 | Serbia | 2009, 2015 | 4 | |
| 11 | Andrija Prlainović | 1987 | 1.87 m (6 ft 2 in) | FP | 29–34 | Serbia | 2016–2020 | 22, 28 | Serbia | 2009, 2015 | 4 | |
| # | Player | Birth | Height | Pos | Age | Men's team | Title | Age | Men's team | Title | Total titles | ISHOF member |
| # | Player | Birth | Height | Pos | Summer Olympics | | | World Aquatics Championships | | | Total titles | ISHOF member |

Male water polo players who won two Olympic titles and a world title
| # | Player | Birth | Height | Pos | Summer Olympics | | | World Aquatics Championships | | | Total titles | ISHOF member |
| # | Player | Birth | Height | Pos | Age | Men's team | Title | Age | Men's team | Title | Total titles | ISHOF member |
|---|---|---|---|---|---|---|---|---|---|---|---|---|
| 17 | Aleksei Barkalov | 1946 | 1.80 m (5 ft 11 in) | FP | 26, 34 | Soviet Union | 1972, 1980^{*} | 29 | Soviet Union | 1975 | 3 | 1993 |
| 18 | Dragan Andrić | 1962 | 1.92 m (6 ft 4 in) | FP | 22–26 | Yugoslavia | 1984–1988 | 24 | Yugoslavia | 1986 | 3 | |
| 18 | Veselin Đuho | 1960 | 1.87 m (6 ft 2 in) | FP | 24–28 | Yugoslavia | 1984–1988 | 26 | Yugoslavia | 1986 | 3 | |
| 18 | Deni Lušić | 1962 | 1.90 m (6 ft 3 in) | FP | 22–26 | Yugoslavia | 1984–1988 | 24 | Yugoslavia | 1986 | 3 | |
| 18 | Tomislav Paškvalin | 1961 | 2.04 m (6 ft 8 in) | FP | 22–27 | Yugoslavia | 1984–1988 | 24 | Yugoslavia | 1986 | 3 | |
| 22 | Rajmund Fodor | 1976 | 1.90 m (6 ft 3 in) | FP | 24–28 | Hungary | 2000–2004 | 27 | Hungary | 2003 | 3 | |
| 22 | Barnabás Steinmetz | 1975 | 1.96 m (6 ft 5 in) | FP | 24–28 | Hungary | 2000–2004 | 27 | Hungary | 2003 | 3 | |
| 22 | Attila Vári | 1976 | 2.00 m (6 ft 7 in) | FP | 24–28 | Hungary | 2000–2004 | 27 | Hungary | 2003 | 3 | |
| 25 | István Gergely | 1976 | 2.01 m (6 ft 7 in) | GK | 28–32 | Hungary | 2004–2008 | 26 | Hungary | 2003 | 3 | |
| 25 | Tamás Varga | 1975 | 2.01 m (6 ft 7 in) | FP | 29–33 | Hungary | 2004–2008 | 28 | Hungary | 2003 | 3 | |
| 27 | Nikola Jakšić | 1997 | 1.97 m (6 ft 6 in) | FP | 19–24 | Serbia | 2016–2020 | 18 | Serbia | 2015 | 3 | |
| 27 | Dušan Mandić | 1994 | 2.02 m (6 ft 8 in) | FP | 22–27 | Serbia | 2016–2020 | 21 | Serbia | 2015 | 3 | |
| 27 | Branislav Mitrović | 1985 | 2.01 m (6 ft 7 in) | GK | 31–36 | Serbia | 2016–2020 | 30 | Serbia | 2015 | 3 | |
| 27 | Sava Ranđelović | 1993 | 1.93 m (6 ft 4 in) | FP | 23–28 | Serbia | 2016–2020 | 22 | Serbia | 2015 | 3 | |
| # | Player | Birth | Height | Pos | Age | Men's team | Title | Age | Men's team | Title | Total titles | ISHOF member |
| # | Player | Birth | Height | Pos | Summer Olympics | | | World Aquatics Championships | | | Total titles | ISHOF member |

Male water polo players who won an Olympic title and two or more world titles
| # | Player | Birth | Height | Pos | Summer Olympics | | | World Aquatics Championships | | | Total titles | ISHOF member |
| # | Player | Birth | Height | Pos | Age | Men's team | Title | Age | Men's team | Title | Total titles | ISHOF member |
|---|---|---|---|---|---|---|---|---|---|---|---|---|
| 31 | Slobodan Nikić | 1983 | 1.97 m (6 ft 6 in) | FP | 33 | Serbia | 2016 | 22 | Serbia and Montenegro | 2005 | 4 | |
| 31 | Slobodan Nikić | 1983 | 1.97 m (6 ft 6 in) | FP | 33 | Serbia | 2016 | 26, 32 | Serbia | 2009, 2015 | 4 | |
| 32 | Dubravko Šimenc | 1966 | 2.01 m (6 ft 7 in) | FP | 21 | Yugoslavia | 1988 | 19–24 | Yugoslavia | 1986–1991 | 3 | |
| 32 | Mirko Vičević | 1968 | 1.92 m (6 ft 4 in) | FP | 20 | Yugoslavia | 1988 | 18–22 | Yugoslavia | 1986–1991 | 3 | 2022 |
| 34 | Daniel Ballart | 1973 | 1.78 m (5 ft 10 in) | FP | 23 | Spain | 1996 | 24–28 | Spain | 1998–2001 | 3 | |
| 34 | Salvador Gómez | 1968 | 1.94 m (6 ft 4 in) | FP | 28 | Spain | 1996 | 29–33 | Spain | 1998–2001 | 3 | |
| 34 | Iván Moro | 1974 | 1.86 m (6 ft 1 in) | FP | 21 | Spain | 1996 | 23–26 | Spain | 1998–2001 | 3 | |
| 34 | Sergi Pedrerol | 1969 | 1.90 m (6 ft 3 in) | FP | 26 | Spain | 1996 | 28–31 | Spain | 1998–2001 | 3 | |
| 34 | Jesús Rollán | 1968 | 1.87 m (6 ft 2 in) | GK | 28 | Spain | 1996 | 29–33 | Spain | 1998–2001 | 3 | 2012 |
| 34 | Carles Sanz | 1975 | 1.77 m (5 ft 10 in) | FP | 21 | Spain | 1996 | 22–26 | Spain | 1998–2001 | 3 | |
| 40 | Živko Gocić | 1982 | 1.93 m (6 ft 4 in) | FP | 33 | Serbia | 2016 | 26, 32 | Serbia | 2009, 2015 | 3 | |
| 41 | Andro Bušlje | 1986 | 2.00 m (6 ft 7 in) | FP | 26 | Croatia | 2012 | 21, 31 | Croatia | 2007, 2017 | 3 | |
| 41 | Maro Joković | 1987 | 2.03 m (6 ft 8 in) | FP | 24 | Croatia | 2012 | 19, 29 | Croatia | 2007, 2017 | 3 | |
| 43 | Dénes Varga | 1987 | 1.93 m (6 ft 4 in) | FP | 21 | Hungary | 2008 | 26, 36 | Hungary | 2013, 2023 | 3 | |
| # | Player | Birth | Height | Pos | Age | Men's team | Title | Age | Men's team | Title | Total titles | ISHOF member |
| # | Player | Birth | Height | Pos | Summer Olympics | | | World Aquatics Championships | | | Total titles | ISHOF member |

Male water polo players who won an Olympic title and a world title (part 1/3)
| # | Player | Birth | Height | Pos | Summer Olympics | | | World Aquatics Championships | | | Total titles | ISHOF member |
| # | Player | Birth | Height | Pos | Age | Men's team | Title | Age | Men's team | Title | Total titles | ISHOF member |
|---|---|---|---|---|---|---|---|---|---|---|---|---|
| 44 | András Bodnár | 1942 | 1.80 m (5 ft 11 in) | FP | 22 | Hungary | 1964 | 31 | Hungary | 1973 | 2 | 2017 |
| 45 | Aleksandr Dolgushin | 1946 | 1.87 m (6 ft 2 in) | FP | 26 | Soviet Union | 1972 | 29 | Soviet Union | 1975 | 2 | 2010 |
| 45 | Aleksandr Dreval | 1944 | 1.90 m (6 ft 3 in) | FP | 28 | Soviet Union | 1972 | 31 | Soviet Union | 1975 | 2 | |
| 45 | Nikolay Melnikov | 1948 | 1.84 m (6 ft 0 in) | FP | 24 | Soviet Union | 1972 | 27 | Soviet Union | 1975 | 2 | |
| 48 | Gábor Csapó | 1950 | 1.98 m (6 ft 6 in) | FP | 25 | Hungary | 1976 | 22 | Hungary | 1973 | 2 | |
| 48 | Tibor Cservenyák | 1948 | 1.85 m (6 ft 1 in) | FP | 27 | Hungary | 1976 | 25 | Hungary | 1973 | 2 | |
| 48 | Tamás Faragó | 1952 | 1.94 m (6 ft 4 in) | FP | 23 | Hungary | 1976 | 21 | Hungary | 1973 | 2 | 1993 |
| 48 | Ferenc Konrád | 1945 | 1.83 m (6 ft 0 in) | FP | 31 | Hungary | 1976 | 28 | Hungary | 1973 | 2 | |
| 48 | Endre Molnár | 1945 | 1.85 m (6 ft 1 in) | GK | 31 | Hungary | 1976 | 28 | Hungary | 1973 | 2 | |
| 48 | László Sárosi | 1946 | 1.83 m (6 ft 0 in) | FP | 29 | Hungary | 1976 | 26 | Hungary | 1973 | 2 | |
| 48 | István Szívós Jr. | 1948 | 2.02 m (6 ft 8 in) | FP | 28 | Hungary | 1976 | 25 | Hungary | 1973 | 2 | 1996 |
| 55 | Vladimir Ivanovich Akimov | 1953 | 1.84 m (6 ft 0 in) | FP | 27 | Soviet Union | 1980^{*} | 29 | Soviet Union | 1982 | 2 | |
| 55 | Mikhail Ivanov | 1958 | 1.88 m (6 ft 2 in) | FP | 22 | Soviet Union | 1980^{*} | 24 | Soviet Union | 1982 | 2 | |
| 55 | Sergey Kotenko | 1956 | 1.76 m (5 ft 9 in) | FP | 23 | Soviet Union | 1980^{*} | 25 | Soviet Union | 1982 | 2 | |
| 55 | Giorgi Mshvenieradze | 1960 | 1.88 m (6 ft 2 in) | FP | 19 | Soviet Union | 1980^{*} | 21 | Soviet Union | 1982 | 2 | |
| 55 | Erkin Shagaev | 1959 | 1.78 m (5 ft 10 in) | FP | 21 | Soviet Union | 1980^{*} | 23 | Soviet Union | 1982 | 2 | |
| 55 | Yevgeny Sharonov | 1958 | 1.89 m (6 ft 2 in) | GK | 21 | Soviet Union | 1980^{*} | 23 | Soviet Union | 1982 | 2 | 2003 |
| # | Player | Birth | Height | Pos | Age | Men's team | Title | Age | Men's team | Title | Total titles | ISHOF member |
| # | Player | Birth | Height | Pos | Summer Olympics | | | World Aquatics Championships | | | Total titles | ISHOF member |

Male water polo players who won an Olympic title and a world title (part 2/3)
| # | Player | Birth | Height | Pos | Summer Olympics | | | World Aquatics Championships | | | Total titles | ISHOF member |
| # | Player | Birth | Height | Pos | Age | Men's team | Title | Age | Men's team | Title | Total titles | ISHOF member |
|---|---|---|---|---|---|---|---|---|---|---|---|---|
| 61 | Milorad Krivokapić | 1956 | 1.87 m (6 ft 2 in) | GK | 28 | Yugoslavia | 1984 | 30 | Yugoslavia | 1986 | 2 | |
| 61 | Zoran Petrović | 1960 | 2.03 m (6 ft 8 in) | FP | 23 | Yugoslavia | 1984 | 26 | Yugoslavia | 1986 | 2 | |
| 61 | Andrija Popović | 1959 | 1.93 m (6 ft 4 in) | GK | 24 | Yugoslavia | 1984 | 26 | Yugoslavia | 1986 | 2 | |
| 61 | Goran Sukno | 1959 | 1.88 m (6 ft 2 in) | FP | 25 | Yugoslavia | 1984 | 27 | Yugoslavia | 1986 | 2 | |
| 65 | Mislav Bezmalinović | 1967 | 1.97 m (6 ft 6 in) | FP | 21 | Yugoslavia | 1988 | 23 | Yugoslavia | 1991 | 2 | |
| 65 | Renco Posinković | 1964 | 1.97 m (6 ft 6 in) | GK | 24 | Yugoslavia | 1988 | 27 | Yugoslavia | 1991 | 2 | |
| 65 | Goran Rađenović | 1966 | 1.97 m (6 ft 6 in) | FP | 21 | Yugoslavia | 1988 | 24 | Yugoslavia | 1991 | 2 | |
| 65 | Aleksandar Šoštar | 1964 | 1.96 m (6 ft 5 in) | GK | 24 | Yugoslavia | 1988 | 26 | Yugoslavia | 1991 | 2 | 2011 |
| 69 | Francesco Attolico | 1963 | 1.93 m (6 ft 4 in) | FP | 29 | Italy | 1992 | 31 | Italy | 1994^{*} | 2 | |
| 69 | Gianni Averaimo | 1964 | 1.83 m (6 ft 0 in) | GK | 27 | Italy | 1992 | 30 | Italy | 1994^{*} | 2 | |
| 69 | Alessandro Bovo | 1969 | 1.85 m (6 ft 1 in) | FP | 23 | Italy | 1992 | 25 | Italy | 1994^{*} | 2 | |
| 69 | Sandro Campagna | 1963 | 1.82 m (6 ft 0 in) | FP | 29 | Italy | 1992 | 31 | Italy | 1994^{*} | 2 | 2019 |
| 69 | Marco D'Altrui | 1964 | 1.80 m (5 ft 11 in) | FP | 28 | Italy | 1992 | 30 | Italy | 1994^{*} | 2 | 2010 |
| 69 | Massimiliano Ferretti | 1966 | 1.94 m (6 ft 4 in) | FP | 26 | Italy | 1992 | 28 | Italy | 1994^{*} | 2 | |
| 69 | Mario Fiorillo | 1962 | 1.79 m (5 ft 10 in) | FP | 29 | Italy | 1992 | 31 | Italy | 1994^{*} | 2 | |
| 69 | Ferdinando Gandolfi | 1967 | | FP | 25 | Italy | 1992 | 27 | Italy | 1994^{*} | 2 | |
| 69 | Amedeo Pomilio | 1967 | 1.78 m (5 ft 10 in) | FP | 25 | Italy | 1992 | 27 | Italy | 1994^{*} | 2 | |
| 69 | Francesco Porzio | 1966 | 1.85 m (6 ft 1 in) | FP | 26 | Italy | 1992 | 28 | Italy | 1994^{*} | 2 | |
| 69 | Pino Porzio | 1967 | | FP | 25 | Italy | 1992 | 27 | Italy | 1994^{*} | 2 | |
| 69 | Carlo Silipo | 1971 | 1.99 m (6 ft 6 in) | FP | 20 | Italy | 1992 | 23 | Italy | 1994^{*} | 2 | |
| # | Player | Birth | Height | Pos | Age | Men's team | Title | Age | Men's team | Title | Total titles | ISHOF member |
| # | Player | Birth | Height | Pos | Summer Olympics | | | World Aquatics Championships | | | Total titles | ISHOF member |

Male water polo players who won an Olympic title and a world title (part 3/3)
| # | Player | Birth | Height | Pos | Summer Olympics | | | World Aquatics Championships | | | Total titles | ISHOF member |
| # | Player | Birth | Height | Pos | Age | Men's team | Title | Age | Men's team | Title | Total titles | ISHOF member |
|---|---|---|---|---|---|---|---|---|---|---|---|---|
| 81 | Manuel Estiarte | 1961 | 1.78 m (5 ft 10 in) | FP | 34 | Spain | 1996 | 36 | Spain | 1998 | 2 | 2007 |
| 81 | Pedro García | 1968 | 1.93 m (6 ft 4 in) | FP | 27 | Spain | 1996 | 29 | Spain | 1998 | 2 | |
| 81 | Jordi Sans | 1965 | 1.80 m (5 ft 11 in) | FP | 30 | Spain | 1996 | 32 | Spain | 1998 | 2 | |
| 84 | Ángel Andreo | 1972 | 1.91 m (6 ft 3 in) | GK | 23 | Spain | 1996 | 28 | Spain | 2001 | 2 | |
| 85 | Zsolt Varga | 1972 | 1.93 m (6 ft 4 in) | FP | 28 | Hungary | 2000 | 31 | Hungary | 2003 | 2 | |
| 86 | Samir Barać | 1973 | 1.87 m (6 ft 2 in) | FP | 38 | Croatia | 2012 | 33 | Croatia | 2007 | 2 | |
| 86 | Miho Bošković | 1983 | 1.96 m (6 ft 5 in) | FP | 29 | Croatia | 2012 | 24 | Croatia | 2007 | 2 | |
| 86 | Damir Burić | 1980 | 2.05 m (6 ft 9 in) | FP | 31 | Croatia | 2012 | 26 | Croatia | 2007 | 2 | |
| 86 | Igor Hinić | 1975 | 2.02 m (6 ft 8 in) | FP | 36 | Croatia | 2012 | 31 | Croatia | 2007 | 2 | |
| 86 | Josip Pavić | 1982 | 1.95 m (6 ft 5 in) | GK | 30 | Croatia | 2012 | 25 | Croatia | 2007 | 2 | |
| 86 | Frano Vićan | 1976 | 1.92 m (6 ft 4 in) | GK | 36 | Croatia | 2012 | 31 | Croatia | 2007 | 2 | |
| 92 | Norbert Hosnyánszky | 1984 | 1.96 m (6 ft 5 in) | FP | 24 | Hungary | 2008 | 29 | Hungary | 2013 | 2 | |
| 92 | Dániel Varga | 1983 | 2.01 m (6 ft 7 in) | FP | 24 | Hungary | 2008 | 29 | Hungary | 2013 | 2 | |
| 94 | Miloš Ćuk | 1990 | 1.91 m (6 ft 3 in) | FP | 25 | Serbia | 2016 | 24 | Serbia | 2015 | 2 | |
| 95 | Ivan Buljubašić | 1987 | 1.98 m (6 ft 6 in) | FP | 24 | Croatia | 2012 | 29 | Croatia | 2017 | 2 | |
| 95 | Sandro Sukno | 1990 | 2.00 m (6 ft 7 in) | FP | 22 | Croatia | 2012 | 27 | Croatia | 2017 | 2 | |
| # | Player | Birth | Height | Pos | Age | Men's team | Title | Age | Men's team | Title | Total titles | ISHOF member |
| # | Player | Birth | Height | Pos | Summer Olympics | | | World Aquatics Championships | | | Total titles | ISHOF member |

=== World champion families ===
The following tables are pre-sorted by date of receiving the gold medal (in ascending order), name of the player (in ascending order), respectively.

Legend

- ^{*} – Host team

| Relationship | Family | Player | Date of birth | Height | Men's team | Pos | World Title | Age | Note | Ref |
|---|---|---|---|---|---|---|---|---|---|---|
| Two brothers | Porzio | Francesco Porzio | 26 January 1966 | 1.85 m (6 ft 1 in) | Italy | FP | 1994^{*} | 28 | Two brothers in a tournament | |
| Two brothers | Porzio | Pino Porzio | 26 February 1967 | | Italy | FP | 1994^{*} | 27 | Two brothers in a tournament | |
| Two brothers | Moro | Iván Moro | 25 December 1974 | 1.86 m (6 ft 1 in) | Spain | FP | 1998 | 23 | | |
| Two brothers | Moro | Iván Moro | 25 December 1974 | 1.86 m (6 ft 1 in) | Spain | FP | 2001 | 26 | Two brothers in a tournament | |
| Two brothers | Moro | Daniel Moro | 8 August 1973 | 1.88 m (6 ft 2 in) | Spain | FP | 2001 | 27 | Two brothers in a tournament | |
| Two brothers | Varga | Tamás Varga | 14 July 1975 | 2.01 m (6 ft 7 in) | Hungary | FP | 2003 | 28 | Two brothers in a tournament | |
| Two brothers | Varga | Zsolt Varga | 24 May 1978 | 1.97 m (6 ft 6 in) | Hungary | FP | 2003 | 25 | Two brothers in a tournament | |
| Two brothers | Pijetlović | Duško Pijetlović | 25 April 1985 | 1.97 m (6 ft 6 in) | Serbia | FP | 2009, 2015 | 24, 30 | Two brothers in a tournament | |
| Two brothers | Pijetlović | Gojko Pijetlović | 7 August 1983 | 1.94 m (6 ft 4 in) | Serbia | GK | 2009, 2015 | 25, 32 | Two brothers in a tournament | |
| Two brothers | Decker | Ádám Decker | 29 February 1984 | 2.03 m (6 ft 8 in) | Hungary | FP | 2013 | 29 | Two brothers in a tournament | |
| Two brothers | Decker | Attila Decker | 25 August 1987 | 1.97 m (6 ft 6 in) | Hungary | GK | 2013 | 25 | Two brothers in a tournament | |
| Two brothers | Varga | Dániel Varga | 25 September 1983 | 2.01 m (6 ft 7 in) | Hungary | FP | 2013 | 29 | Two brothers in a tournament | |
| Two brothers | Varga | Dénes Varga | 29 March 1987 | 1.93 m (6 ft 4 in) | Hungary | FP | 2013, 2023 | 26, 36 | Two brothers in a tournament | |
| Relationship | Family | Player | Date of birth | Height | Men's team | Pos | World Title | Age | Note | Ref |

| Relationship | Family | Player | Date of birth | Height | Men's team | Pos | World Title | Age | Ref |
|---|---|---|---|---|---|---|---|---|---|
| Father and son | Kásás | Zoltán Kásás | 15 September 1946 | 1.90 m (6 ft 3 in) | Hungary | FP | 1973 | 26 | |
| Father and son | Kásás | Tamás Kásás | 20 July 1976 | 2.00 m (6 ft 7 in) | Hungary | FP | 2003 | 27 | |
| Father and son | Szívós | István Szívós Jr. | 24 April 1948 | 2.02 m (6 ft 8 in) | Hungary | FP | 1973 | 25 | |
| Father and son | Szívós | Márton Szívós | 19 August 1981 | 1.93 m (6 ft 4 in) | Hungary | FP | 2013 | 31 | |
| Father and son | Sukno | Goran Sukno | 6 April 1959 | 1.88 m (6 ft 2 in) | Yugoslavia | FP | 1986 | 27 | |
| Father and son | Sukno | Sandro Sukno | 30 June 1990 | 2.00 m (6 ft 7 in) | Croatia | FP | 2017 | 27 | |

== Coach statistics ==
=== Most successful coaches ===
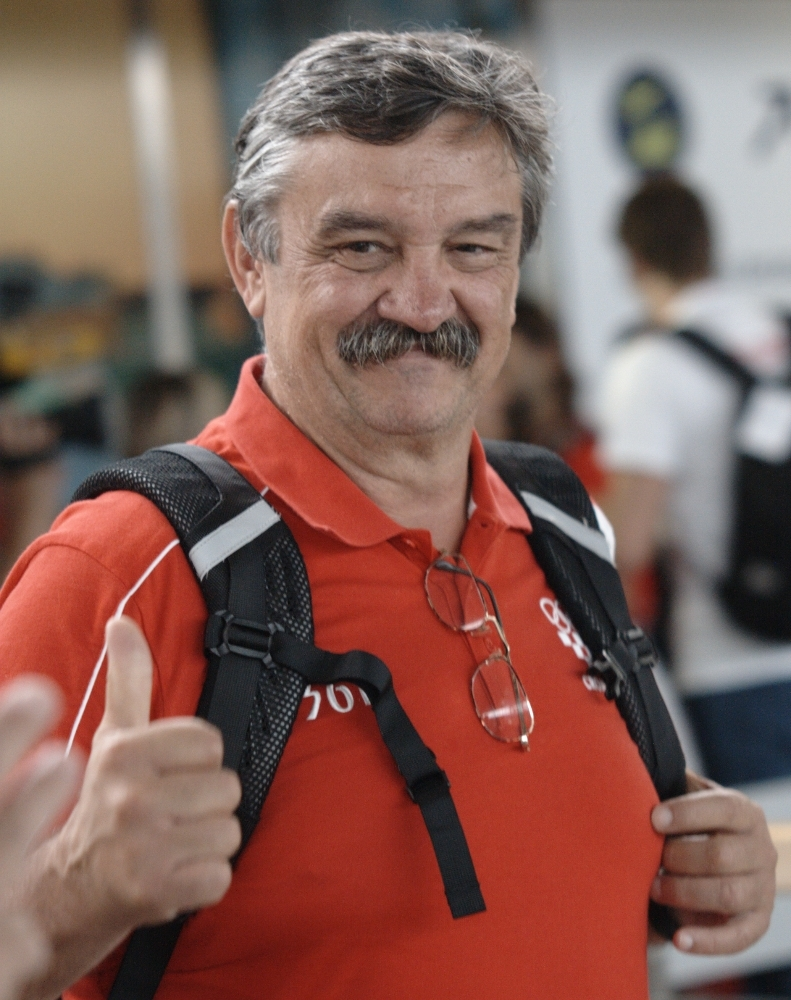
Ratko Rudić coached three men's national teams to the world titles.

The following table is pre-sorted by number of gold medals (in descending order), date of winning the last gold medal (in ascending order), name of the coach (in ascending order), respectively.

There are four coaches who led men's national water polo teams to win two or more gold medals at the World Aquatics Championships.

Ratko Rudić led three men's national water polo teams to win gold medals at the World Aquatics Championships. He guided Yugoslavia men's national team to a gold medal in 1986, Italy men's national team to a gold medal in 1994, and Croatia men's national team to a gold medal in 2007, making him the first and only coach to lead three different men's national water polo teams to the world titles.

Spaniard Juan Jané coached the Spain men's national team to two consecutive gold medals at the World Aquatics Championships in 1998 and 2001.

Alessandro Campagna and Ivica Tucak are other coaches who led men's national water polo teams to win two gold medals. Under Campagna's leadership, the Italy men's national team won two world titles in 2011 and 2019. Tucak guided Croatia men's national team to win gold medals in 2017 and 2024.

Legend

- ^{*} – Host team

Head coaches who led men's national teams to win two or more gold medals at the World Aquatics Championships
| Rk | Head coach | Nationality | Birth | Age | Men's team | World titles | Total | Ref |
|---|---|---|---|---|---|---|---|---|
| 1 | Ratko Rudić | Yugoslavia | 1948 | 38 | Yugoslavia | 1986 | 3 | |
| 1 | Ratko Rudić | Croatia | 1948 | 46 | Italy | 1994 | 3 | |
| 1 | Ratko Rudić | Croatia | 1948 | 58 | Croatia | 2007 | 3 | |
| 2 | Juan Jané | Spain | 1953 | 44–48 | Spain | 1998–2001 | 2 | |
| 2 | Alessandro Campagna | Italy | 1963 | 48, 56 | Italy | 2011, 2019 | 2 | |
| 2 | Ivica Tucak | Croatia | 1970 | 47, 54 | Croatia | 2017, 2024 | 2 | |

=== Champions as coach and player ===
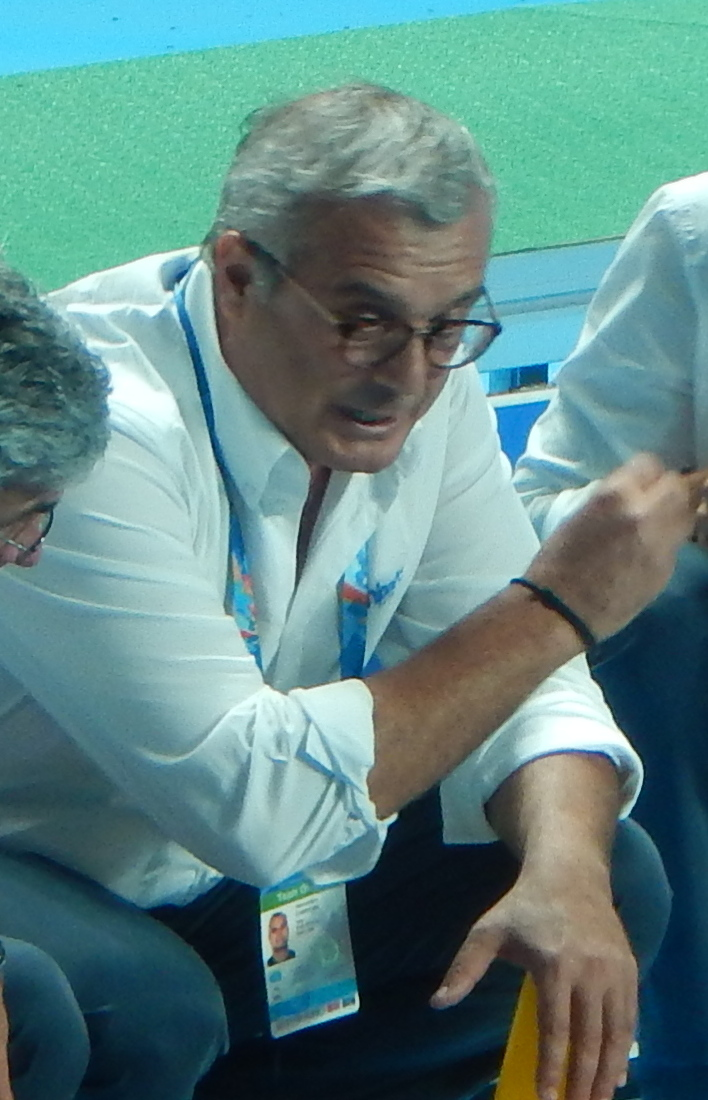
Alessandro Campagna of Italy is a dual world champion as coach and player.

The following table is pre-sorted by number of gold medals (in descending order), date of winning the last gold medal (in ascending order), name of the person (in ascending order), respectively.

Three water polo players won gold medals at the World Aquatics Championships and then guided men's national water polo teams to the world titles as head coaches.

Tibor Benedek of Hungary won a gold medal at the 2003 World Aquatics Championships. Ten years later, he coached the Hungary men's national team to the world title in 2013.

Italian Alessandro Campagna won a gold medal at the 1994 World Aquatics Championships in Rome, coached by Ratko Rudić. As a head coach, he led Italy men's national team to win two gold in 2011 and 2019.

Dejan Savić, representing Serbia and Montenegro, won a gold medal in 2005. He then guided Serbia men's national team to the world title in 2015.

Legend

- ^{*} – Host team

| Rk | Person | Birth | Height | Player | | | | Head coach | | | Total titles | Ref |
| Rk | Person | Birth | Height | Age | Men's team | Pos | Title | Age | Men's team | Title | Total titles | Ref |
|---|---|---|---|---|---|---|---|---|---|---|---|---|
| 1 | Alessandro Campagna | 1963 | 1.82 m (6 ft 0 in) | 31 | Italy | FP | 1994^{*} | 48, 56 | Italy | 2011, 2019 | 3 | |
| 2 | Tibor Benedek | 1972 | 1.90 m (6 ft 3 in) | 31 | Hungary | D | 2003 | 41 | Hungary | 2013 | 2 | |
| 2 | Dejan Savić | 1975 | 1.90 m (6 ft 3 in) | 30 | Serbia and Montenegro | CB | 2005 | 40 | Serbia | 2015 | 2 | |

=== Olympic and world champions (coaches) ===
The following table is pre-sorted by number of Olympic titles (in descending order), number of world titles (in descending order), year of winning the last gold medal (in ascending order), year of winning the first gold medal (in ascending order), name of the coach (in ascending order), respectively. Last updated: 12 September 2021.

As of the 2020 Summer Olympics, there are six head coaches who led men's national teams to win gold medals in water polo at the Summer Olympics and the World Aquatics Championships.

Legend

- Year^{*} – As host team

Head coaches who led men's national teams to win gold medals in water polo at the Summer Olympics and the World Aquatics Championships
| # | Coach | Nationality | Birth | Summer Olympics | | | World Aquatics Championships | | | Total titles | ISHOF member | Ref |
| # | Coach | Nationality | Birth | Age | Men's team | Title | Age | Men's team | Title | Total titles | ISHOF member | Ref |
|---|---|---|---|---|---|---|---|---|---|---|---|---|
| 1 | Ratko Rudić | Yugoslavia | 1948 | 36–40 | Yugoslavia | 1984–1988 | 38 | Yugoslavia | 1986 | 7 | 2007 | |
| 1 | Ratko Rudić | Croatia | 1948 | 44 | Italy | 1992 | 46 | Italy | 1994^{*} | 7 | 2007 | |
| 1 | Ratko Rudić | Croatia | 1948 | 64 | Croatia | 2012 | 58 | Croatia | 2007 | 7 | 2007 | |
| 2 | Dénes Kemény | Hungary | 1954 | 46–54 | Hungary | 2000–2004–2008 | 49 | Hungary | 2003 | 4 | 2011 | |
| 3 | Dejan Savić | Serbia | 1975 | 41–46 | Serbia | 2016–2020 | 40 | Serbia | 2015 | 3 | | |
| 4 | Juan Jané | Spain | 1953 | 43 | Spain | 1996 | 44–48 | Spain | 1998–2001 | 3 | | |
| 5 | Dezső Gyarmati | Hungary | 1927 | 48 | Hungary | 1976 | 45 | Hungary | 1973 | 2 | 1976 | |
| 5 | Boris Popov | Soviet Union | 1941 | 39 | Soviet Union | 1980^{*} | 41 | Soviet Union | 1982 | 2 | 2019 | |

== Champions by tournament ==
=== 2019 (Italy, 4th title) ===
- Edition of men's tournament: 18th
- Host city: Gwangju, South Korea
- Number of participating teams: 16
- Competition format: Round-robin pools advanced teams to classification matches
- Champion: Italy (4th title; 1st place in preliminary D group)

Results
| Match | Round | Date | Cap color | Opponent | Result | Goals for | Goals against | Goals diff. |
|---|---|---|---|---|---|---|---|---|
| Match 1/6 | Preliminary round – Group D | 15 July 2019 | Blue | Brazil | Won | 14 | 5 | 9 |
| Match 2/6 | Preliminary round – Group D | 17 July 2019 | Blue | Japan | Won | 9 | 7 | 2 |
| Match 3/6 | Preliminary round – Group D | 19 July 2019 | Blue | Germany | Won | 8 | 7 | 1 |
| Match 4/6 | Quarter-finals | 23 July 2019 | White | Greece | Won | 7 | 6 | 1 |
| Match 5/6 | Semi-finals | 25 July 2019 | Blue | Hungary | Won | 12 | 10 | 2 |
| Match 6/6 | Gold medal match | 27 July 2019 | Blue | Spain | Won | 10 | 5 | 5 |
| Total | Matches played: 6 • Wins: 6 • Ties: 0 • Defeats: 0 • Win %: 100% | | | | | 60 | 40 | 20 |

Source: Official Results Books (PDF): 2019 (Men's Competition Schedule, Men's Round Summary).

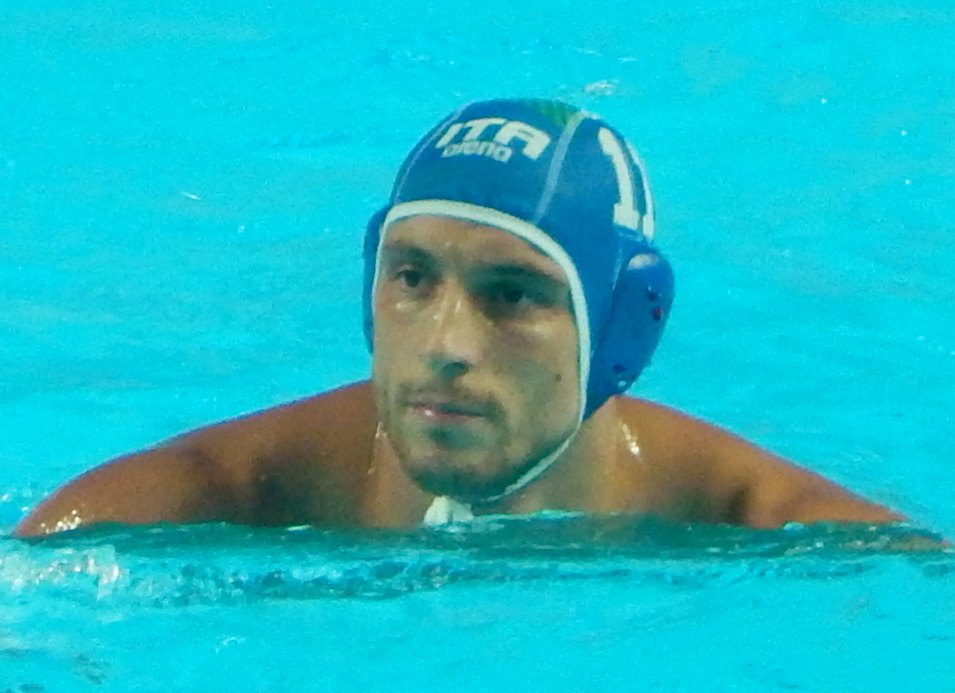
Matteo Aicardi, the center forward of the Italy team, won his second world title in 2019.

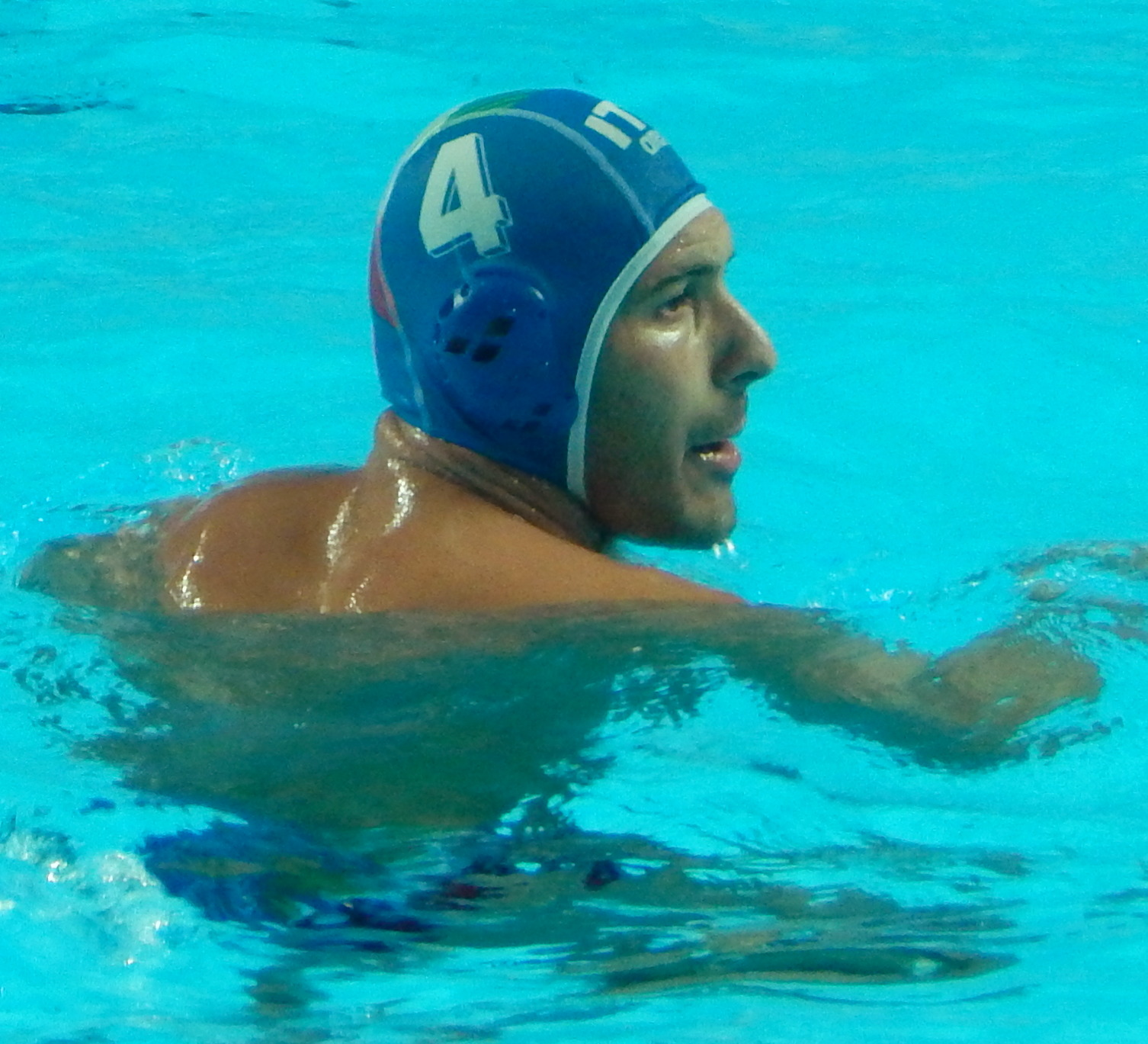
Pietro Figlioli, the captain of Italy, won his second world title in 2019.

- Head coach: (Italy) Alessandro Campagna (2nd title as head coach)
- Assistant coaches: (Italy) Amedeo Pomilio, (Italy) Alessandro Duspiva

Roster
| Cap No. | Player | Pos | L/R | Height | Weight | Date of birth | Age of winning gold | ISHOF member |
|---|---|---|---|---|---|---|---|---|
| 1 | Marco Del Lungo | GK | R | 1.90 m (6 ft 3 in) | | 1 March 1990 | 29 years, 148 days | |
| 2 | Francesco Di Fulvio | D | R | 1.88 m (6 ft 2 in) | | 15 August 1993 | 25 years, 346 days | |
| 3 | Stefano Luongo | FP | R | 1.80 m (5 ft 11 in) | | 5 January 1990 | 29 years, 203 days | |
| 4 | Pietro Figlioli (C) | D | R | 1.92 m (6 ft 4 in) | | 29 May 1984 | 35 years, 59 days | |
| 5 | Edoardo Di Somma | FP | | | | 30 September 1996 | 22 years, 300 days | |
| 6 | Alessandro Velotto | CB | R | 1.85 m (6 ft 1 in) | | 12 February 1995 | 24 years, 165 days | |
| 7 | Vincenzo Renzuto | FP | R | 1.85 m (6 ft 1 in) | | 8 April 1993 | 26 years, 110 days | |
| 8 | Gonzalo Echenique | FP | L | 1.90 m (6 ft 3 in) | | 27 April 1990 | 29 years, 91 days | |
| 9 | Niccolò Figari | CB | R | 1.97 m (6 ft 6 in) | | 24 January 1988 | 31 years, 184 days | |
| 10 | Michaël Bodegas | CF | R | 1.92 m (6 ft 4 in) | | 3 May 1987 | 32 years, 85 days | |
| 11 | Matteo Aicardi | CF | R | 1.92 m (6 ft 4 in) | | 19 April 1986 | 33 years, 99 days | |
| 12 | Vincenzo Dolce | FP | R | 1.95 m (6 ft 5 in) | | 11 May 1995 | 24 years, 77 days | |
| 13 | Gianmarco Nicosia | GK | R | 1.87 m (6 ft 2 in) | | 12 February 1998 | 21 years, 165 days | |
| Average | | | | 1.89 m (6 ft 2 in) (Note: Average height of 12 players.) | | 13 June 1991 | 28 years, 44 days | |
| Coach | Alessandro Campagna | | | 1.82 m (6 ft 0 in) | | 26 June 1963 | 56 years, 31 days | 2019 |

Sources:

- Official Results Books (PDF): 2019 (Team Roster – Italy);
- ISHOF: "Honorees by Country".

Abbreviation

- MP – Matches played
- Min – Minutes
- G – Goals
- Sh – Shots
- TF – Turnover fouls
- ST – Steals
- RB – Rebounds
- BL – Blocked shots
- SP – Sprints
- 20S – 20 seconds exclusion
- DE – Double exclusion
- Pen – Penalty
- EX – Exclusion

Statistics
| Cap No. | Player | Pos | MP | Minutes played | | Goals/Shots | | | TF | ST | RB | BL | Sprints | | | Personal fouls | | | |
| Cap No. | Player | Pos | MP | Min | % | G | Sh | % | TF | ST | RB | BL | Won | SP | % | 20S | DE | Pen | EX |
|---|---|---|---|---|---|---|---|---|---|---|---|---|---|---|---|---|---|---|---|
| 1 | Marco Del Lungo | GK | 6 | 192 | 100% | | | | | 5 | 5 | | | | | | | 1 | |
| 2 | Francesco Di Fulvio | D | 6 | 154 | 80.2% | 10 | 39 | 25.6% | 7 | 3 | 3 | 2 | 4 | 4 | 100% | 5 | | 1 | |
| 3 | Stefano Luongo | FP | 6 | 136 | 70.8% | 11 | 29 | 37.9% | 6 | 2 | 6 | 3 | 2 | 3 | 66.7% | 4 | 1 | | |
| 4 | Pietro Figlioli (C) | D | 6 | 139 | 72.4% | 9 | 35 | 25.7% | 5 | 2 | 5 | 3 | 13 | 14 | 92.9% | 3 | | 1 | |
| 5 | Edoardo Di Somma | FP | 6 | 51 | 26.6% | 0 | 6 | 0.0% | 2 | 1 | 2 | 1 | | | | 7 | | 1 | 2 |
| 6 | Alessandro Velotto | CB | 6 | 116 | 60.4% | 5 | 12 | 41.7% | 3 | 4 | 5 | 1 | 3 | 3 | 100% | 13 | | | 2 |
| 7 | Vincenzo Renzuto | FP | 6 | 101 | 52.6% | 3 | 9 | 33.3% | 1 | 4 | | | | | | 7 | | 1 | 1 |
| 8 | Gonzalo Echenique | FP | 5 | 111 | 57.8% | 5 | 16 | 31.3% | 3 | 3 | 5 | 4 | | | | 2 | | | 1 |
| 9 | Niccolò Figari | CB | 6 | 80 | 41.7% | 4 | 8 | 50.0% | 1 | 2 | 2 | 2 | | | | 9 | | 1 | 2 |
| 10 | Michaël Bodegas | CF | 6 | 92 | 47.9% | 5 | 10 | 50.0% | 9 | 3 | | 2 | | | | 6 | | | |
| 11 | Matteo Aicardi | CF | 6 | 105 | 54.7% | 5 | 20 | 25.0% | 14 | 1 | 1 | 3 | | | | 3 | | | |
| 12 | Vincenzo Dolce | FP | 6 | 64 | 33.3% | 3 | 6 | 50.0% | 7 | 1 | 1 | | | | | 6 | | | |
| 13 | Gianmarco Nicosia | GK | 6 | 0 | 0.0% | | | | | | | | | | | | | | |
| Team | | | | | | | | | 5 | | | | | | | | | | |
| Total | | | 6 | 192 | 100% | 60 | 190 | 31.6% | 63 | 31 | 35 | 21 | 22 | 24 | 91.7% | 65 | 1 | 6 | 8 |
| Against | | | | | | 40 | 165 | 24.2% | 69 | 25 | 37 | 19 | 2 | 24 | 8.3% | 75 | 1 | 4 | 7 |

| Cap No. | Player | Pos | Saves/Shots | | |
| Cap No. | Player | Pos | Saves | Shots | % |
|---|---|---|---|---|---|
| 1 | Marco Del Lungo | GK | 67 | 107 | 62.6% |
| 13 | Gianmarco Nicosia | GK | | | |
| Total | | | 67 | 107 | 62.6% |

Source: Official Results Books (PDF): 2019 (Cumulative Statistics – Italy, p. 3).

=== 2017 (Croatia, 2nd title) ===
- Edition of men's tournament: 17th
- Host city: Budapest, Hungary
- Number of participating teams: 16
- Competition format: Round-robin pools advanced teams to classification matches
- Champion: Croatia (2nd title; 1st place in preliminary D group)

Results
| Match | Round | Date | Cap color | Opponent | Result | Goals for | Goals against | Goals diff. |
|---|---|---|---|---|---|---|---|---|
| Match 1/6 | Preliminary round – Group D | 17 July 2017 | Blue | United States | Won | 12 | 7 | 5 |
| Match 2/6 | Preliminary round – Group D | 19 July 2017 | Blue | Russia | Won | 10 | 8 | 2 |
| Match 3/6 | Preliminary round – Group D | 21 July 2017 | Blue | Japan | Won | 16 | 6 | 10 |
| Match 4/6 | Quarter-finals | 25 July 2017 | White | Italy | Won | 12 | 9 | 3 |
| Match 5/6 | Semi-finals | 27 July 2017 | Blue | Serbia | Won | 12 | 11 | 1 |
| Match 6/6 | Gold medal match | 29 July 2017 | Blue | Hungary | Won | 8 | 6 | 2 |
| Total | Matches played: 6 • Wins: 6 • Ties: 0 • Defeats: 0 • Win %: 100% | | | | | 70 | 47 | 23 |

Source: Official Results Books (PDF): 2017 (Men's Competition Schedule, Men's Round Summary).

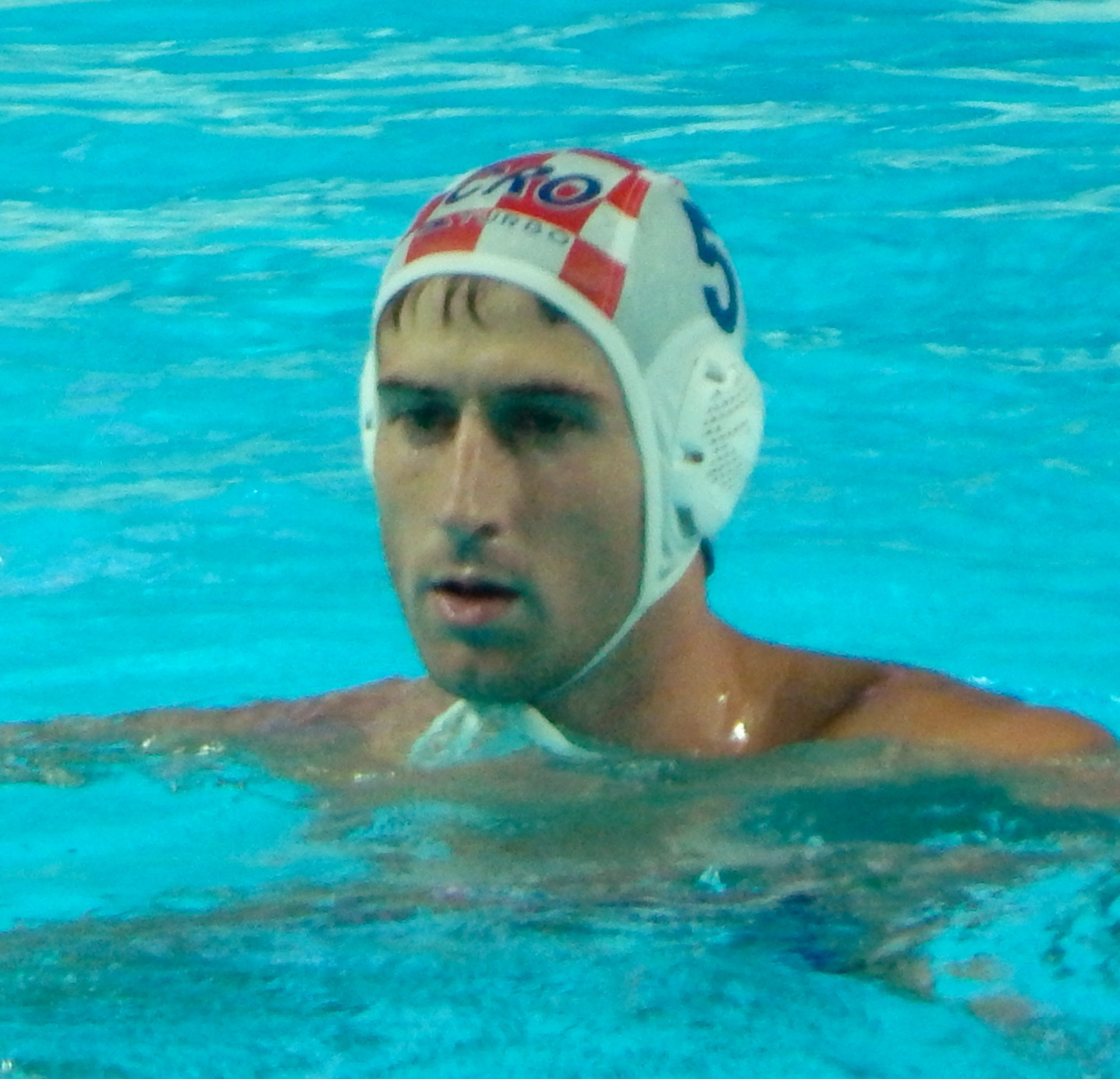
Left-hander Maro Joković of Croatia won his second world title in 2017, with 12 goals.

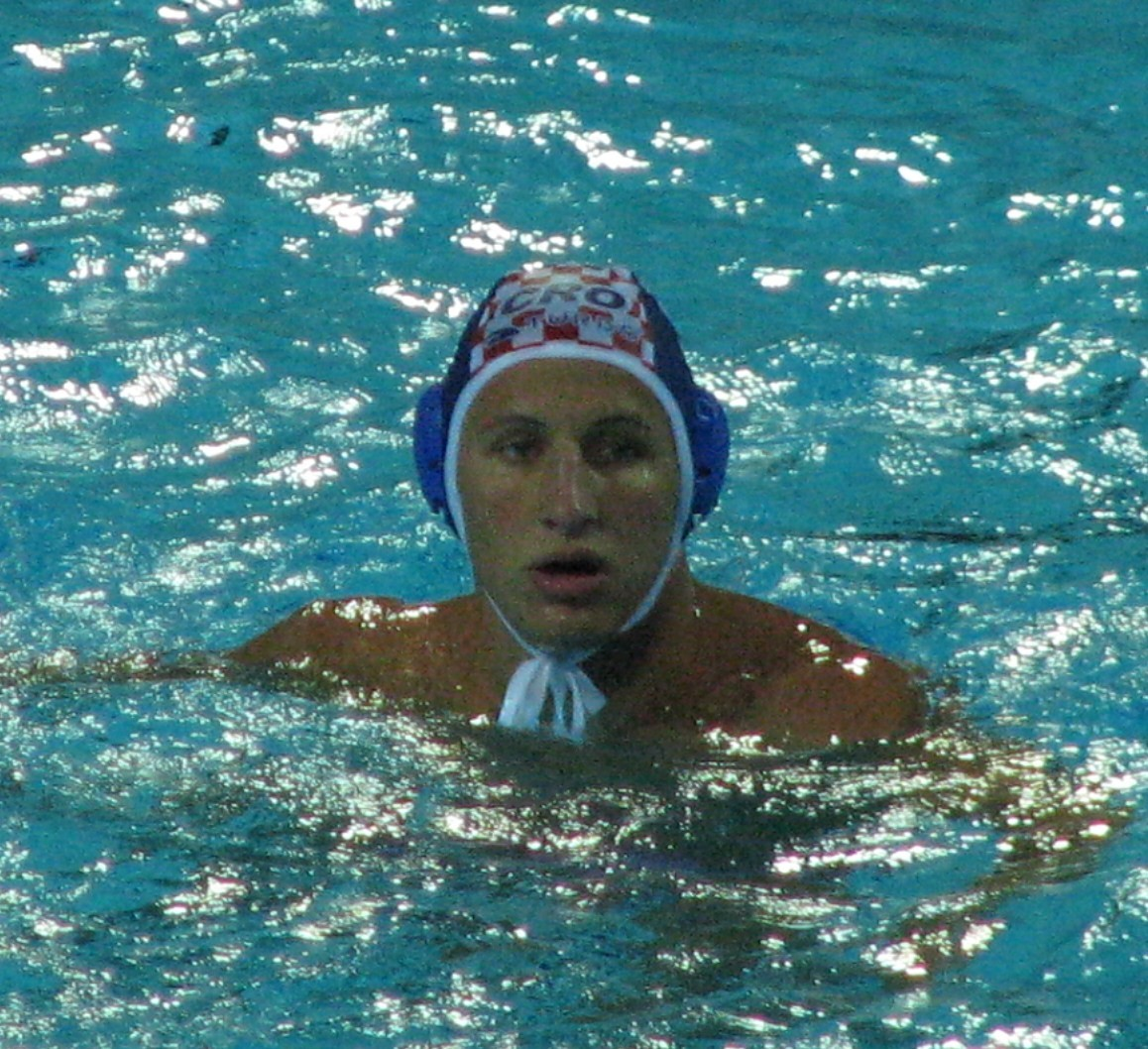
Sandro Sukno, the captain of Croatia, netted 16 goals at the 2017 World Aquatics Championships, becoming the team-leading scorer for the tournament.

- Head coach: (Croatia) Ivica Tucak (1st title as head coach)
- Assistant coaches: (Croatia) Mile Smodlaka, (Croatia) Pero Kuterovac

Roster
| Cap No. | Player | Pos | L/R | Height | Weight | Date of birth | Age of winning gold | ISHOF member |
|---|---|---|---|---|---|---|---|---|
| 1 | Marko Bijač | GK | R | 2.01 m (6 ft 7 in) | 85 kg (187 lb) | 12 January 1991 | 26 years, 198 days | |
| 2 | Marko Macan | CB | R | 1.95 m (6 ft 5 in) | 110 kg (243 lb) | 26 April 1993 | 24 years, 94 days | |
| 3 | Loren Fatović | D | R | 1.85 m (6 ft 1 in) | 84 kg (185 lb) | 16 November 1996 | 20 years, 255 days | |
| 4 | Luka Lončar | CF | R | 1.95 m (6 ft 5 in) | 107 kg (236 lb) | 26 June 1987 | 30 years, 33 days | |
| 5 | Maro Joković | D | L | 2.03 m (6 ft 8 in) | 95 kg (209 lb) | 1 October 1987 | 29 years, 301 days | |
| 6 | Ivan Buljubašić | CB | R | 1.98 m (6 ft 6 in) | 108 kg (238 lb) | 31 October 1987 | 29 years, 271 days | |
| 7 | Ante Vukičević | D | R | 1.86 m (6 ft 1 in) | 93 kg (205 lb) | 24 February 1993 | 24 years, 155 days | |
| 8 | Andro Bušlje | CF | R | 2.00 m (6 ft 7 in) | 115 kg (254 lb) | 4 January 1986 | 31 years, 206 days | |
| 9 | Sandro Sukno (C) | D | R | 2.00 m (6 ft 7 in) | 93 kg (205 lb) | 30 June 1990 | 27 years, 29 days | |
| 10 | Ivan Krapić | CF | R | 1.96 m (6 ft 5 in) | 105 kg (231 lb) | 14 February 1989 | 28 years, 165 days | |
| 11 | Anđelo Šetka | D | R | 1.86 m (6 ft 1 in) | 87 kg (192 lb) | 14 September 1985 | 31 years, 318 days | |
| 12 | Xavier García | D | L | 1.98 m (6 ft 6 in) | 92 kg (203 lb) | 5 January 1984 | 33 years, 205 days | |
| 13 | Ivan Marcelić | GK | R | 1.90 m (6 ft 3 in) | 90 kg (198 lb) | 18 February 1994 | 23 years, 161 days | |
| Average | | | | 1.95 m (6 ft 5 in) | 97 kg (214 lb) | 6 October 1989 | 27 years, 296 days | |
| Coach | Ivica Tucak | | | | | 8 February 1970 | 47 years, 171 days | |

Sources:

- Official Results Books (PDF): 2017 (Team Roster – Croatia);
- ISHOF: "Honorees by Country".

Abbreviation

- MP – Matches played
- Min – Minutes
- G – Goals
- Sh – Shots
- AS – Rebounds
- TF – Turnover fouls
- ST – Steals
- BL – Blocked shots
- SP – Sprints
- 20S – 20 seconds exclusion
- DE – Double exclusion
- Pen – Penalty
- EX – Exclusion

Statistics
| Cap No. | Player | Pos | MP | Minutes played | | Goals/Shots | | | AS | TF | ST | BL | Sprints | | | Personal fouls | | | |
| Cap No. | Player | Pos | MP | Min | % | G | Sh | % | AS | TF | ST | BL | Won | SP | % | 20S | DE | Pen | EX |
|---|---|---|---|---|---|---|---|---|---|---|---|---|---|---|---|---|---|---|---|
| 1 | Marko Bijač | GK | 6 | 168 | 87.5% | | | | 1 | | 8 | | | | | | | | |
| 2 | Marko Macan | CB | 6 | 70 | 36.5% | 1 | 3 | 33.3% | 1 | 1 | 2 | | | | | 12 | | | 2 |
| 3 | Loren Fatović | D | 6 | 79 | 41.1% | 5 | 9 | 55.6% | 3 | 3 | 3 | 1 | 1 | 7 | 14.3% | 9 | 1 | | |
| 4 | Luka Lončar | CF | 6 | 109 | 56.8% | 11 | 17 | 64.7% | 1 | 10 | 2 | 2 | | | | 3 | | | 2 |
| 5 | Maro Joković | D | 6 | 157 | 81.8% | 12 | 30 | 40.0% | 8 | 2 | 6 | 5 | 1 | 6 | 16.7% | 3 | | | |
| 6 | Ivan Buljubašić | CB | 6 | 50 | 26.0% | 1 | 4 | 25.0% | 1 | 2 | 3 | | | | | 12 | | | 1 |
| 7 | Ante Vukičević | D | 6 | 114 | 59.4% | 6 | 11 | 54.5% | 3 | 5 | | 1 | 1 | 1 | 100% | 3 | | | |
| 8 | Andro Bušlje | CF | 6 | 92 | 47.9% | 4 | 12 | 33.3% | 1 | 3 | 5 | 3 | | | | 10 | 1 | 1 | 1 |
| 9 | Sandro Sukno (C) | D | 6 | 132 | 68.8% | 16 | 28 | 57.1% | 12 | 6 | 11 | 3 | 0 | 2 | 0.0% | 3 | | | |
| 10 | Ivan Krapić | CF | 6 | 72 | 37.5% | 0 | 3 | 0.0% | | 11 | 2 | 2 | | | | 2 | | 1 | |
| 11 | Anđelo Šetka | D | 6 | 121 | 63.0% | 3 | 17 | 17.6% | 2 | 3 | 1 | | 3 | 8 | 37.5% | 5 | | | |
| 12 | Xavier García | D | 6 | 155 | 80.7% | 11 | 26 | 42.3% | 13 | 5 | 1 | 3 | | | | 7 | | | |
| 13 | Ivan Marcelić | GK | 6 | 24 | 12.5% | | | | | | | | | | | | | | |
| Team | | | | | | | | | | 8 | | | | | | | | | |
| Total | | | 6 | 192 | 100% | 70 | 160 | 43.8% | 46 | 59 | 44 | 20 | 6 | 24 | 25.0% | 69 | 2 | 2 | 6 |
| Against | | | | | | 47 | 156 | 30.1% | 39 | 71 | 34 | 10 | 18 | 24 | 75.0% | 67 | 2 | 2 | 7 |

| Cap No. | Player | Pos | Saves/Shots | | |
| Cap No. | Player | Pos | Saves | Shots | % |
|---|---|---|---|---|---|
| 1 | Marko Bijač | GK | 49 | 89 | 55.1% |
| 13 | Ivan Marcelić | GK | 6 | 13 | 46.2% |
| Total | | | 55 | 102 | 53.9% |

Source: Official Results Books (PDF): 2017 (Cumulative Statistics – Croatia, p. 3).

=== 2015 (Serbia, 2nd title) ===
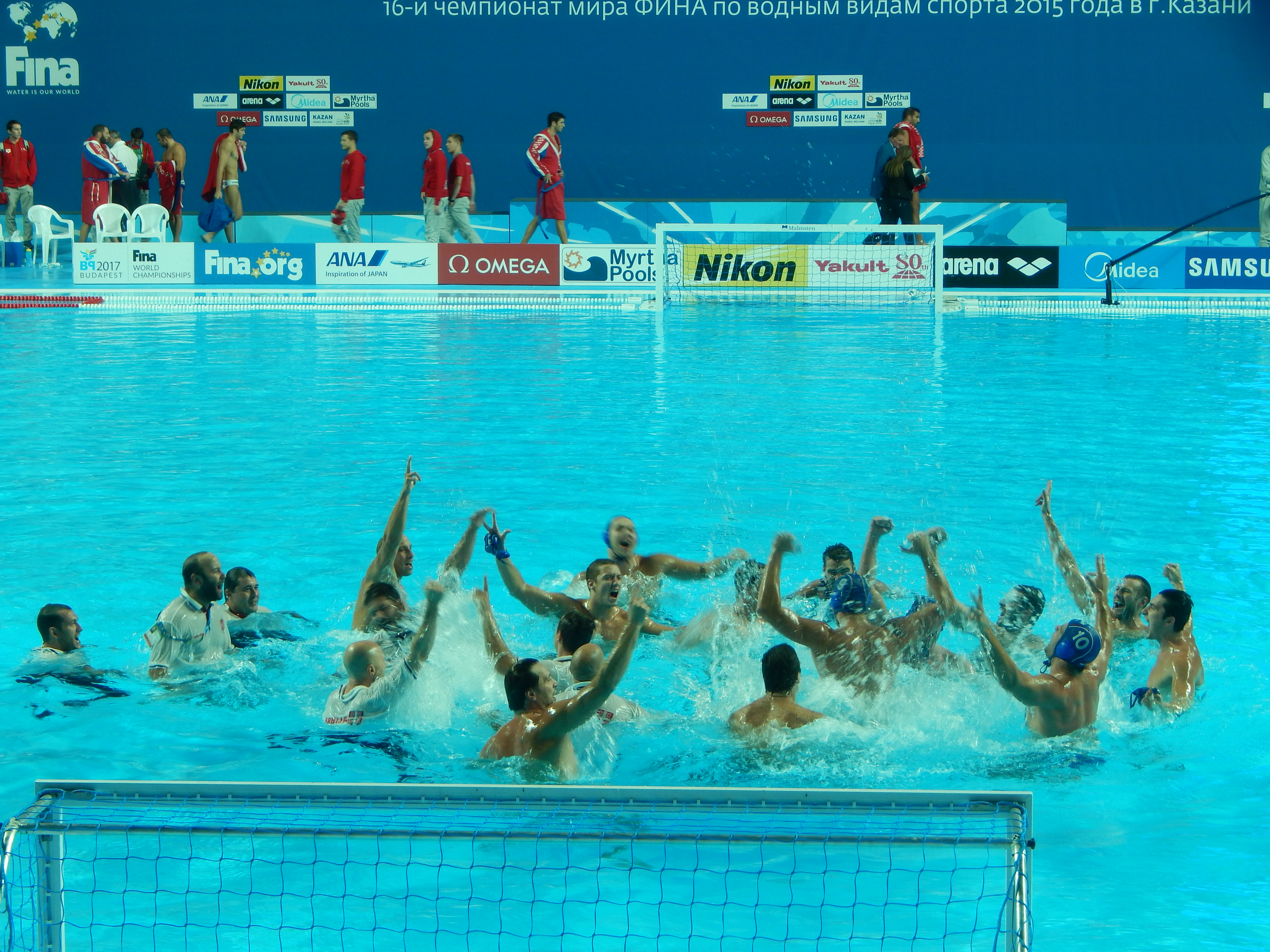
Serbia men's national water polo team celebrated after the gold medal match of the 2015 World Aquatics Championships.

- Edition of men's tournament: 16th
- Host city: Kazan, Russia
- Number of participating teams: 16
- Competition format: Round-robin pools advanced teams to classification matches
- Champion: Serbia (2nd title; 1st place in preliminary D group)

Results
| Match | Round | Date | Cap color | Opponent | Result | Goals for | Goals against | Goals diff. |
|---|---|---|---|---|---|---|---|---|
| Match 1/6 | Preliminary round – Group D | 27 July 2015 | White | Montenegro | Won | 11 | 8 | 3 |
| Match 2/6 | Preliminary round – Group D | 29 July 2015 | White | Japan | Won | 19 | 9 | 10 |
| Match 3/6 | Preliminary round – Group D | 31 July 2015 | White | Australia | Won | 10 | 9 | 1 |
| Match 4/6 | Quarter-finals | 4 August 2015 | White | United States | Won | 12 | 7 | 5 |
| Match 5/6 | Semi-finals | 6 August 2015 | Blue | Italy | Won | 10 | 6 | 4 |
| Match 6/6 | Gold medal match | 8 August 2015 | Blue | Croatia | Won | 11 | 4 | 7 |
| Total | Matches played: 6 • Wins: 6 • Ties: 0 • Defeats: 0 • Win %: 100% | | | | | 73 | 43 | 30 |

Source: Official Results Books (PDF): 2015 (Men's Competition Schedule, Men's Round Summary).

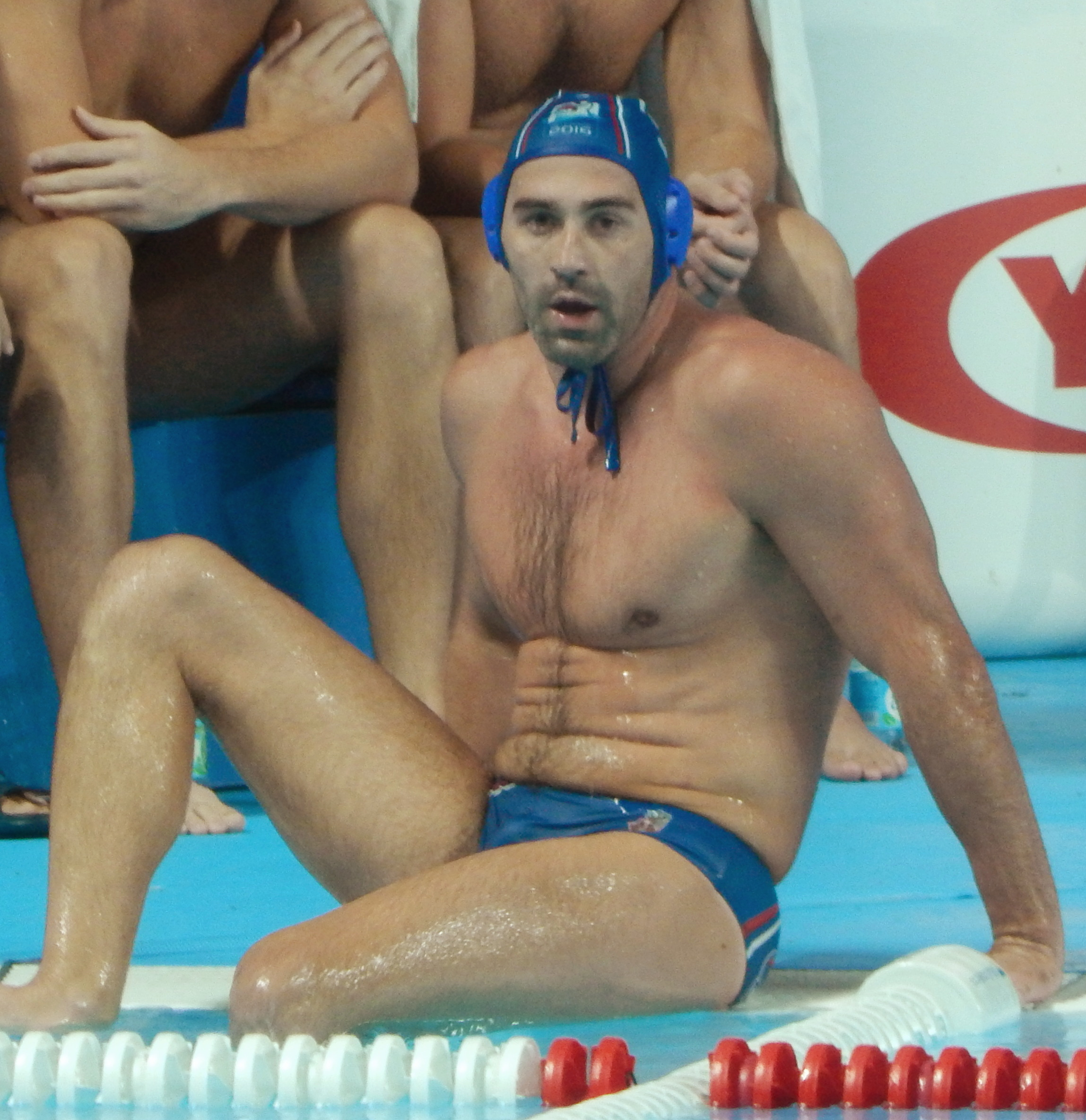
Živko Gocić, the captain of Serbia, won his second world title in 2015.

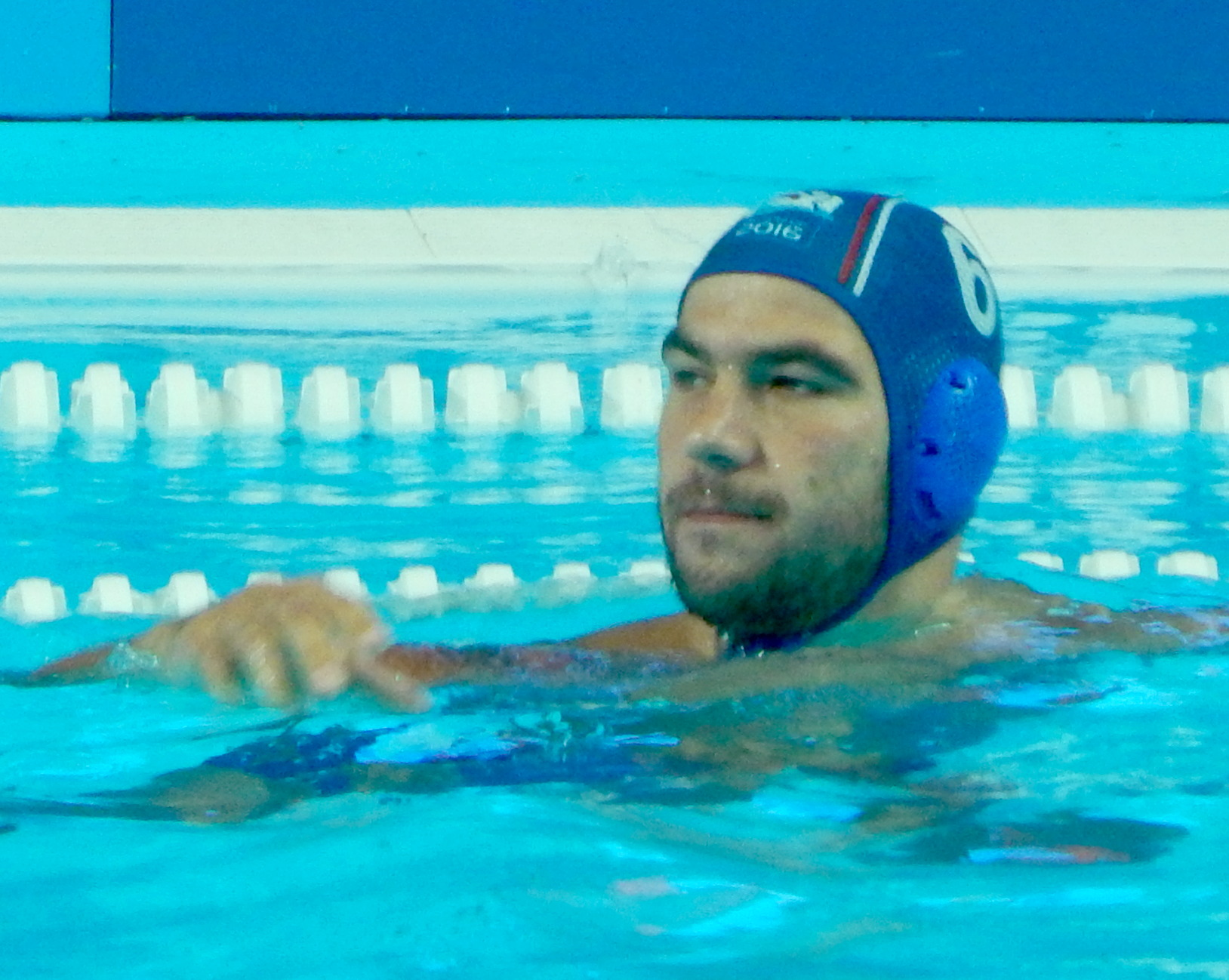
Duško Pijetlović, the center forward of the Serbia team, won his second world title in 2015. He was the team-leading scorer for the tournament.

- Head coach: (Serbia) Dejan Savić (1st title as head coach)
- Assistant coaches: (Serbia) Zarko Petrovic, (Serbia) Uros Stevanovic

Roster
| Cap No. | Player | Pos | L/R | Height | Weight | Date of birth | Age of winning gold | ISHOF member |
|---|---|---|---|---|---|---|---|---|
| 1 | Gojko Pijetlović | GK | R | 1.94 m (6 ft 4 in) | 100 kg (220 lb) | 7 August 1983 | 32 years, 1 day | |
| 2 | Dušan Mandić | D | L | 2.02 m (6 ft 8 in) | 115 kg (254 lb) | 16 June 1994 | 21 years, 53 days | |
| 3 | Živko Gocić (C) | D | R | 1.93 m (6 ft 4 in) | 100 kg (220 lb) | 22 August 1982 | 32 years, 351 days | |
| 4 | Sava Ranđelović | CB | R | 1.93 m (6 ft 4 in) | 104 kg (229 lb) | 17 July 1993 | 22 years, 22 days | |
| 5 | Miloš Ćuk | D | R | 1.90 m (6 ft 3 in) | 85 kg (187 lb) | 21 December 1990 | 24 years, 230 days | |
| 6 | Duško Pijetlović | CF | R | 1.97 m (6 ft 6 in) | 105 kg (231 lb) | 25 April 1985 | 30 years, 105 days | |
| 7 | Slobodan Nikić | CF | R | 1.97 m (6 ft 6 in) | 107 kg (236 lb) | 25 January 1983 | 32 years, 195 days | |
| 8 | Milan Aleksić | CB | R | 1.92 m (6 ft 4 in) | 103 kg (227 lb) | 13 May 1986 | 29 years, 87 days | |
| 9 | Nikola Jakšić | CB | R | 1.97 m (6 ft 6 in) | 99 kg (218 lb) | 17 January 1997 | 18 years, 203 days | |
| 10 | Filip Filipović | D | L | 1.96 m (6 ft 5 in) | 106 kg (234 lb) | 2 May 1987 | 28 years, 98 days | |
| 11 | Andrija Prlainović | D | R | 1.87 m (6 ft 2 in) | 96 kg (212 lb) | 28 April 1987 | 28 years, 102 days | |
| 12 | Stefan Mitrović | D | R | 1.95 m (6 ft 5 in) | 91 kg (201 lb) | 29 March 1988 | 27 years, 132 days | |
| 13 | Branislav Mitrović | GK | R | 2.01 m (6 ft 7 in) | 102 kg (225 lb) | 30 January 1985 | 30 years, 190 days | |
| Average | | | | 1.95 m (6 ft 5 in) | 101 kg (223 lb) | 28 January 1988 | 27 years, 192 days | |
| Coach | Dejan Savić | | | 1.90 m (6 ft 3 in) | | 24 April 1975 | 40 years, 106 days | |

Note: Duško Pijetlović and Gojko Pijetlović are brothers.
Sources:

- Official Results Books (PDF): 2015 (Team Roster – Serbia);
- ISHOF: "Honorees by Country".

Abbreviation

- MP – Matches played
- Min – Minutes
- G – Goals
- Sh – Shots
- AS – Assists
- TF – Turnover fouls
- ST – Steals
- BL – Blocked shots
- SP – Sprints
- 20S – 20 seconds exclusion
- DE – Double exclusion
- Pen – Penalty
- EX – Exclusion

Statistics
| Cap No. | Player | Pos | MP | Minutes played | | Goals/Shots | | | AS | TF | ST | BL | SP won | Personal fouls | | | |
| Cap No. | Player | Pos | MP | Min | % | G | Sh | % | AS | TF | ST | BL | SP won | 20S | DE | Pen | EX |
|---|---|---|---|---|---|---|---|---|---|---|---|---|---|---|---|---|---|
| 1 | Gojko Pijetlović | GK | 6 | 84 | 43.8% | | | | | | 2 | | | | | | |
| 2 | Dušan Mandić | D | 6 | 111 | 57.8% | 7 | 15 | 46.7% | 6 | 6 | 5 | 1 | | 6 | | | |
| 3 | Živko Gocić (C) | D | 6 | 116 | 60.4% | 3 | 8 | 37.5% | 2 | 3 | 5 | | 1 | 5 | | | |
| 4 | Sava Ranđelović | CB | 6 | 60 | 31.3% | 1 | 7 | 14.3% | 2 | 2 | 3 | 3 | | 13 | | | 2 |
| 5 | Miloš Ćuk | D | 6 | 98 | 51.0% | 6 | 17 | 35.3% | 2 | 4 | | 3 | 1 | 2 | | 1 | |
| 6 | Duško Pijetlović | CF | 6 | 97 | 50.5% | 11 | 17 | 64.7% | 2 | 4 | 2 | 3 | | 6 | | | 1 |
| 7 | Slobodan Nikić | CF | 6 | 98 | 51.0% | 9 | 18 | 50.0% | | 2 | 2 | 2 | | 3 | | | |
| 8 | Milan Aleksić | CB | 6 | 85 | 44.3% | 7 | 18 | 38.9% | 5 | 6 | 2 | | | 9 | | | |
| 9 | Nikola Jakšić | CB | 6 | 68 | 35.4% | 4 | 8 | 50.0% | | 3 | | | | 8 | | | |
| 10 | Filip Filipović | D | 6 | 137 | 71.4% | 7 | 26 | 26.9% | 7 | 8 | 5 | 2 | | 5 | | 1 | |
| 11 | Andrija Prlainović | D | 6 | 155 | 80.7% | 9 | 23 | 39.1% | 6 | 11 | 9 | 2 | | 2 | | 1 | |
| 12 | Stefan Mitrović | D | 6 | 126 | 65.6% | 9 | 19 | 47.4% | 3 | 5 | 5 | 2 | 2 | 1 | | | |
| 13 | Branislav Mitrović | GK | 6 | 108 | 56.3% | | | | | | 2 | | | | | | |
| Total | | | 6 | 192 | 100% | 73 | 176 | 41.5% | 35 | 54 | 42 | 18 | 4 | 60 | 0 | 3 | 3 |
| Against | | | | | | 43 | 153 | 28.1% | 6 | 86 | 21 | 11 | 20 | 50 | 0 | 1 | 5 |

| Cap No. | Player | Pos | Saves/Shots | | |
| Cap No. | Player | Pos | Saves | Shots | % |
|---|---|---|---|---|---|
| 1 | Gojko Pijetlović | GK | 18 | 42 | 42.9% |
| 13 | Branislav Mitrović | GK | 35 | 54 | 64.8% |
| Total | | | 53 | 96 | 55.2% |

Source: Official Results Books (PDF): 2015 (Cumulative Statistics – Serbia, p. 2).

=== 2013 (Hungary, 3rd title) ===
- Edition of men's tournament: 15th
- Host city: Barcelona, Spain
- Number of participating teams: 16
- Competition format: Round-robin pools advanced teams to classification matches
- Champion: Hungary (3rd title;2nd place in preliminary C group)

Results
| Match | Round | Date | Cap color | Opponent | Result | Goals for | Goals against | Goals diff. |
|---|---|---|---|---|---|---|---|---|
| Match 1/7 | Preliminary round – Group C | 22 July 2013 | White | China | Won | 13 | 5 | 8 |
| Match 2/7 | Preliminary round – Group C | 24 July 2013 | Blue | Serbia | Lost | 10 | 13 | -3 |
| Match 3/7 | Preliminary round – Group C | 26 July 2013 | White | Australia | Drawn | 9 | 9 | 0 |
| Match 4/7 | Quarter-final qualification | 28 July 2013 | White | Kazakhstan | Won | 16 | 7 | 9 |
| Match 5/7 | Quarter-finals | 30 July 2013 | Blue | Greece | Won | 9 | 3 | 6 |
| Match 6/7 | Semi-finals | 1 August 2013 | White | Croatia | Won | 11 | 10 | 1 |
| Match 7/7 | Gold medal match | 3 August 2013 | White | Montenegro | Won | 8 | 7 | 1 |
| Total | Matches played: 7 • Wins: 5 • Ties: 1 • Defeats: 1 • Win %: 71.4% | | | | | 76 | 54 | 22 |

Source: Official Results Books (PDF): 2013 (Men's Competition Schedule, Men's Round Summary).

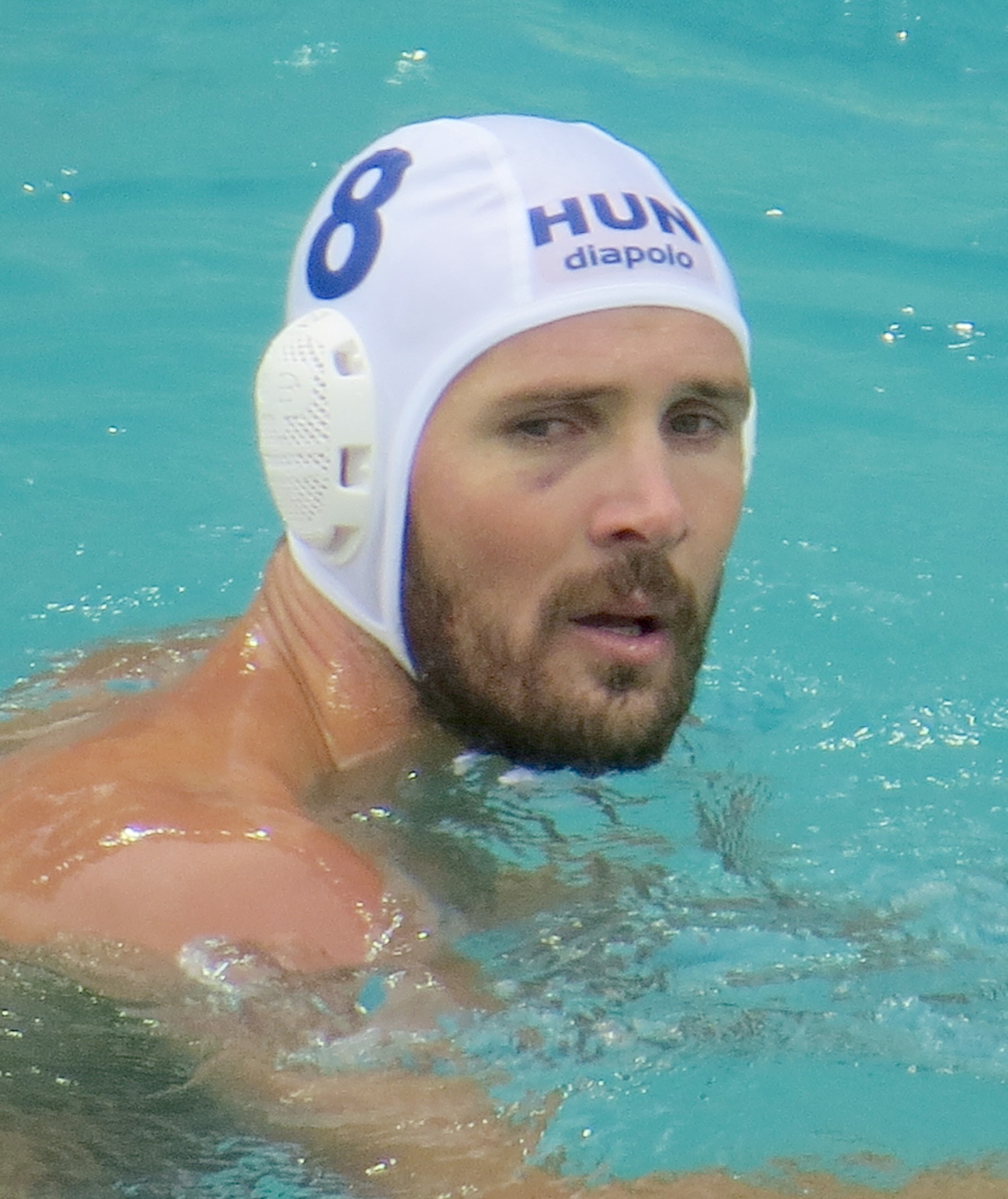
Márton Szívós scored 12 goals at the 2013 World Aquatics Championships, helping Hungary win gold.

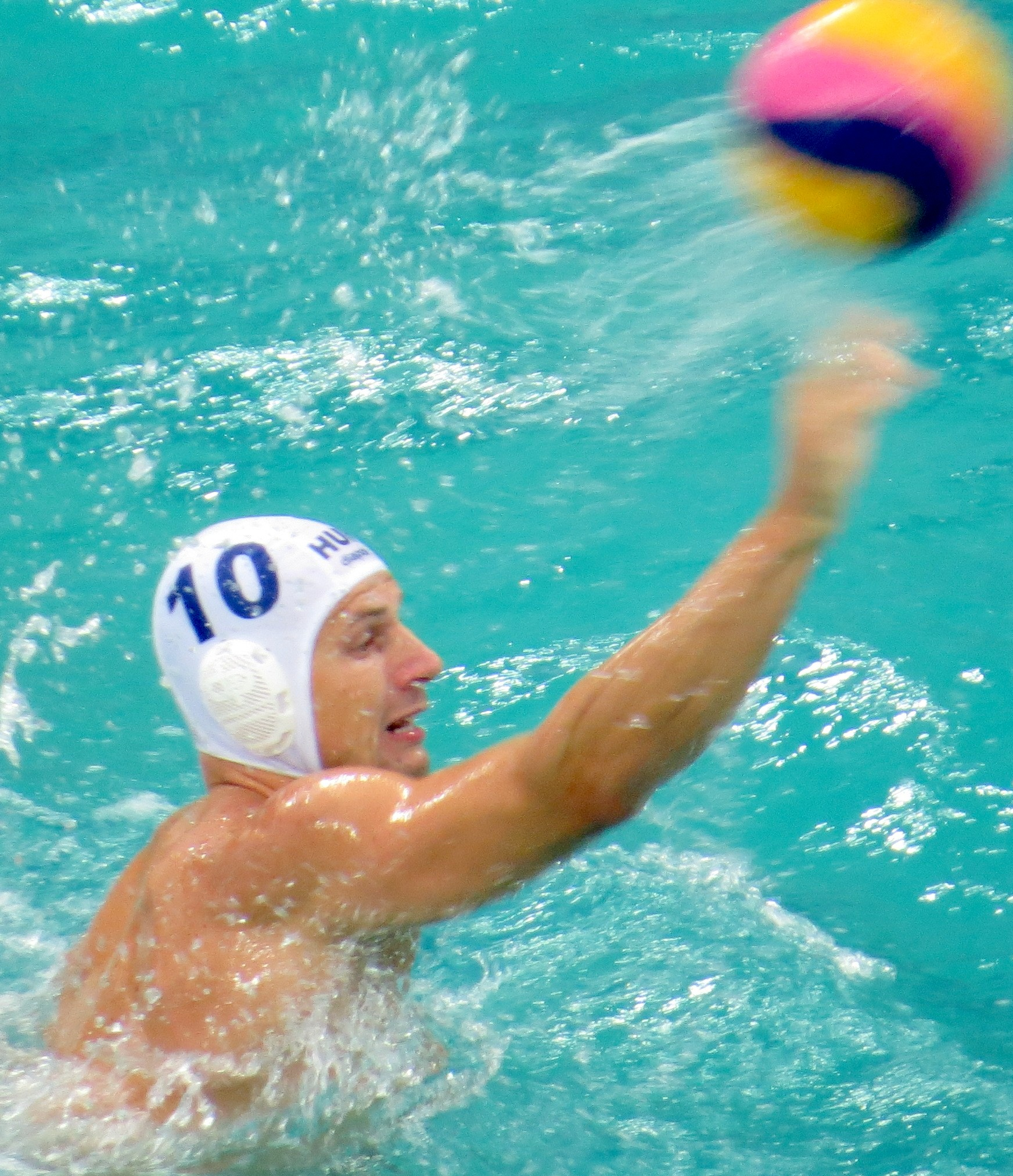
Dénes Varga of Hungary netted 13 goals at the 2013 World Championship, becoming the team-leading scorer for the tournament.

- Head coach: (Hungary) Tibor Benedek (1st title as head coach)
- Assistant coach: (Hungary) Norbert Dabrowski

Roster
| Cap No. | Player | Pos | L/R | Height | Weight | Date of birth | Age of winning gold | ISHOF member |
|---|---|---|---|---|---|---|---|---|
| 1 | Viktor Nagy | GK | R | 1.98 m (6 ft 6 in) | 94 kg (207 lb) | 24 July 1984 | 29 years, 10 days | |
| 2 | Miklós Gór-Nagy | CB | R | 1.92 m (6 ft 4 in) | 100 kg (220 lb) | 8 January 1983 | 30 years, 207 days | |
| 3 | Norbert Madaras | D | L | 1.91 m (6 ft 3 in) | 91 kg (201 lb) | 1 December 1979 | 33 years, 245 days | |
| 4 | Bence Bátori | D | R | | | 28 December 1991 | 21 years, 218 days | |
| 5 | Márton Vámos | D | L | 2.02 m (6 ft 8 in) | 105 kg (231 lb) | 24 June 1992 | 21 years, 40 days | |
| 6 | Norbert Hosnyánszky | D | R | 1.96 m (6 ft 5 in) | 102 kg (225 lb) | 4 March 1984 | 29 years, 152 days | |
| 7 | Ádám Decker | CB | R | 2.03 m (6 ft 8 in) | 98 kg (216 lb) | 29 February 1984 | 29 years, 156 days | |
| 8 | Márton Szívós | D | R | 1.93 m (6 ft 4 in) | 91 kg (201 lb) | 19 August 1981 | 31 years, 349 days | |
| 9 | Dániel Varga (C) | D | R | 2.01 m (6 ft 7 in) | 95 kg (209 lb) | 25 September 1983 | 29 years, 312 days | |
| 10 | Dénes Varga | D | R | 1.93 m (6 ft 4 in) | 95 kg (209 lb) | 29 March 1987 | 26 years, 127 days | |
| 11 | Krisztián Bedő | CF | R | 1.93 m (6 ft 4 in) | 107 kg (236 lb) | 4 May 1993 | 20 years, 91 days | |
| 12 | Balázs Hárai | CF | R | 2.02 m (6 ft 8 in) | 110 kg (243 lb) | 5 April 1987 | 26 years, 120 days | |
| 13 | Attila Decker | GK | R | 1.97 m (6 ft 6 in) | 94 kg (207 lb) | 25 August 1987 | 25 years, 343 days | |
| Average | | | | 1.97 m (6 ft 6 in) | 99 kg (218 lb) (Note: Average weight of 12 players.) | 30 March 1986 | 27 years, 126 days | |
| Coach | Tibor Benedek | | | 1.90 m (6 ft 3 in) | | 12 July 1972 | 41 years, 22 days | 2016 |

Note: Ádám Decker and Attila Decker are brothers; Dániel Varga and Dénes Varga are brothers.
Sources:

- Official Results Books (PDF): 2013 (Team Roster – Hungary);
- ISHOF: "Honorees by Country".

Abbreviation

- MP – Matches played
- Min – Minutes
- G – Goals
- Sh – Shots
- AS – Assists
- TF – Turnover fouls
- ST – Steals
- BL – Blocked shots
- SP – Sprints
- 20S – 20 seconds exclusion
- DE – Double exclusion
- Pen – Penalty
- EX – Exclusion

Statistics
| Cap No. | Player | Pos | MP | Minutes played | | Goals/Shots | | | AS | TF | ST | BL | Sprints | | | Personal fouls | | | |
| Cap No. | Player | Pos | MP | Min | % | G | Sh | % | AS | TF | ST | BL | Won | SP | % | 20S | DE | Pen | EX |
|---|---|---|---|---|---|---|---|---|---|---|---|---|---|---|---|---|---|---|---|
| 1 | Viktor Nagy | GK | 7 | 192 | 85.7% | | | | 1 | 1 | 6 | | | | | | | 1 | |
| 2 | Miklós Gór-Nagy | CB | 7 | 80 | 35.7% | 2 | 8 | 25.0% | 1 | 1 | 2 | 1 | | | | 14 | | | 3 |
| 3 | Norbert Madaras | D | 7 | 164 | 73.2% | 6 | 32 | 18.8% | 10 | 4 | 2 | 4 | 0 | 1 | 0.0% | 3 | | | |
| 4 | Bence Bátori | D | 7 | 72 | 32.1% | 3 | 7 | 42.9% | | 5 | 2 | | 3 | 10 | 30.0% | 1 | | 1 | |
| 5 | Márton Vámos | D | 7 | 134 | 59.8% | 12 | 16 | 75.0% | 3 | 2 | 4 | 3 | 3 | 7 | 42.9% | 7 | | 1 | |
| 6 | Norbert Hosnyánszky | D | 7 | 119 | 53.1% | 7 | 16 | 43.8% | 3 | 3 | 3 | 3 | | | | 10 | 1 | | 1 |
| 7 | Ádám Decker | CB | 7 | 70 | 31.3% | 2 | 3 | 66.7% | 1 | 4 | | | | | | 14 | 1 | 1 | 5 |
| 8 | Márton Szívós | D | 7 | 148 | 66.1% | 12 | 25 | 48.0% | 3 | 5 | 6 | 4 | 0 | 1 | 0.0% | 7 | | | 1 |
| 9 | Dániel Varga (C) | D | 7 | 165 | 73.7% | 5 | 21 | 23.8% | 9 | 3 | 6 | 4 | 0 | 1 | 0.0% | 8 | | | |
| 10 | Dénes Varga | D | 7 | 174 | 77.7% | 13 | 25 | 52.0% | 4 | 4 | 5 | 3 | 4 | 8 | 50.0% | 5 | | | 1 |
| 11 | Krisztián Bedő | CF | 7 | 91 | 40.6% | 6 | 13 | 46.2% | 1 | 15 | 1 | 1 | | | | 5 | | | |
| 12 | Balázs Hárai | CF | 7 | 126 | 56.3% | 8 | 15 | 53.3% | 1 | 26 | 2 | 4 | | | | 5 | | | |
| 13 | Attila Decker | GK | 7 | 32 | 14.3% | | | | | 1 | 1 | | | | | | | | |
| Team | | | | | | | | | | 4 | | | | | | | | | |
| Total | | | 7 | 224 | 100% | 76 | 181 | 42.0% | 37 | 78 | 40 | 27 | 10 | 28 | 35.7% | 79 | 2 | 4 | 11 |
| Against | | | | | | 54 | 186 | 29.0% | 28 | 85 | 40 | 17 | 18 | 28 | 64.3% | 70 | 2 | 3 | 8 |

| Cap No. | Player | Pos | Saves/Shots | | |
| Cap No. | Player | Pos | Saves | Shots | % |
|---|---|---|---|---|---|
| 1 | Viktor Nagy | GK | 54 | 99 | 54.5% |
| 13 | Attila Decker | GK | 11 | 20 | 55.0% |
| Total | | | 65 | 119 | 54.6% |

Source: Official Results Books (PDF): 2013 (Cumulative Statistics – Hungary, p. 2).

=== 2011 (Italy, 3rd title) ===
- Edition of men's tournament: 14th
- Host city: Shanghai, China
- Number of participating teams: 16
- Competition format: Round-robin pools advanced teams to classification matches
- Champion: Italy (3rd title; 1st place in preliminary D group)

Results
| Match | Round | Date | Cap color | Opponent | Result | Goals for | Goals against | Goals diff. |
|---|---|---|---|---|---|---|---|---|
| Match 1/6 | Preliminary round – Group D | 18 July 2011 | White | South Africa | Won | 17 | 1 | 16 |
| Match 2/6 | Preliminary round – Group D | 20 July 2011 | Blue | United States | Won | 8 | 5 | 3 |
| Match 3/6 | Preliminary round – Group D | 22 July 2011 | White | Germany | Won | 7 | 6 | 1 |
| Match 4/6 | Quarter-finals | 26 July 2011 | White | Spain | Won | 10 | 6 | 4 |
| Match 5/6 | Semi-finals | 28 July 2011 | Blue | Croatia | Won | 9 | 8 | 1 |
| Match 6/6 | Gold medal match | 30 July 2011 | Blue | Serbia | Won | 8 | 7 | 1 |
| Total | Matches played: 6 • Wins: 6 • Ties: 0 • Defeats: 0 • Win %: 100% | | | | | 59 | 33 | 26 |

Source: Official Results Books (PDF): 2011 (Men's Competition Schedule, Men's Round Summary).

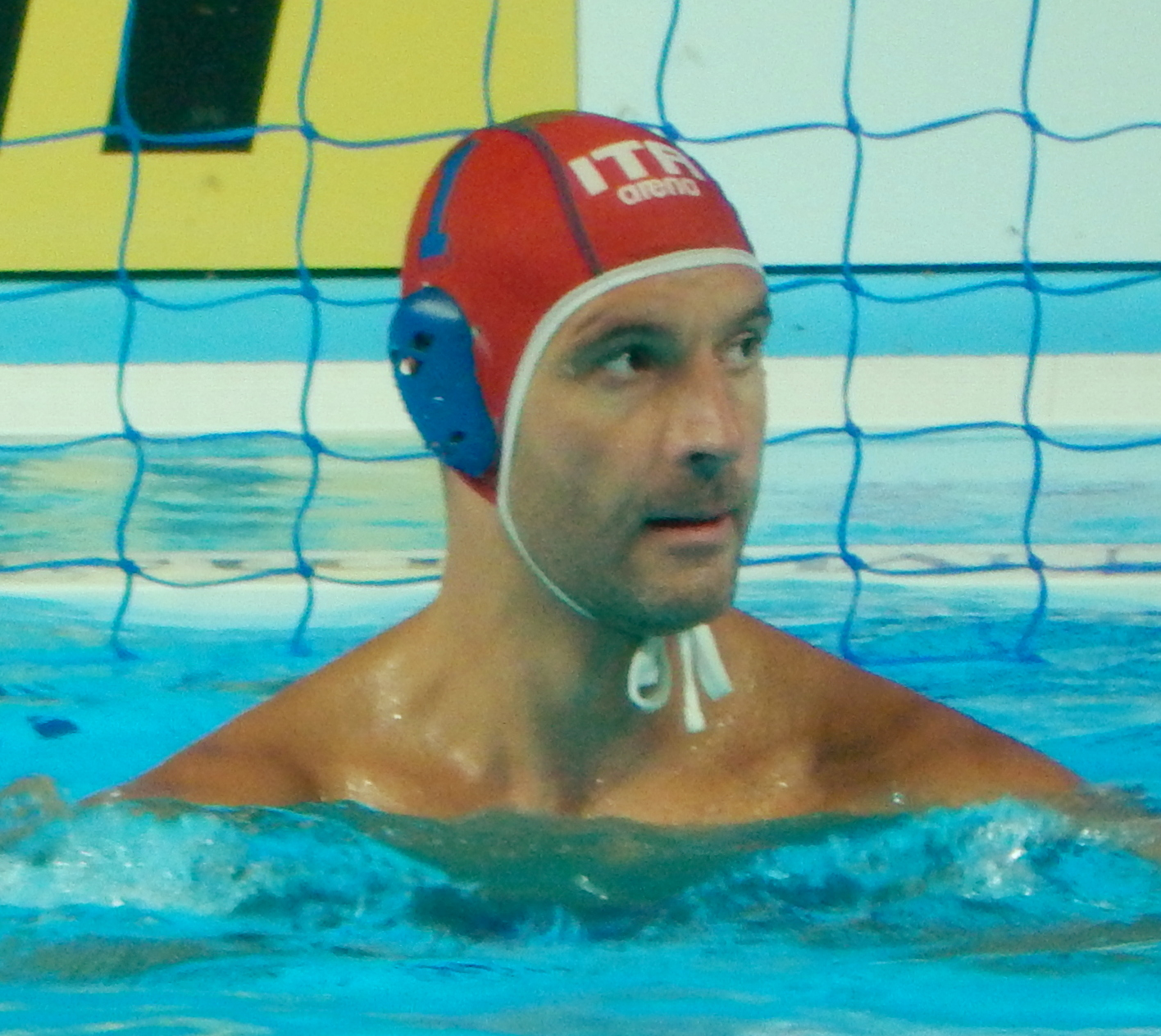
Stefano Tempesti, the captain of Italy, saved 64 shots at the 2011 World Aquatics Championships.

- Head coach: (Italy) Alessandro Campagna (1st title as head coach)

Roster
| Cap No. | Player | Pos | L/R | Height | Weight | Date of birth | Age of winning gold | ISHOF member |
|---|---|---|---|---|---|---|---|---|
| 1 | Stefano Tempesti (C) | GK | R | 2.05 m (6 ft 9 in) | 99 kg (218 lb) | 9 June 1979 | 32 years, 51 days | |
| 2 | Amaurys Pérez | CB | R | 1.94 m (6 ft 4 in) | 80 kg (176 lb) | 18 March 1976 | 35 years, 134 days | |
| 3 | Niccolò Gitto | CB | R | 1.85 m (6 ft 1 in) | 82 kg (181 lb) | 12 October 1986 | 24 years, 291 days | |
| 4 | Pietro Figlioli | D | R | 1.92 m (6 ft 4 in) | 98 kg (216 lb) | 29 May 1984 | 27 years, 62 days | |
| 5 | Alex Giorgetti | D | R | 1.85 m (6 ft 1 in) | 83 kg (183 lb) | 24 December 1987 | 23 years, 218 days | |
| 6 | Maurizio Felugo | D | R | 1.89 m (6 ft 2 in) | 86 kg (190 lb) | 4 March 1981 | 30 years, 148 days | |
| 7 | Niccolò Figari | CB | R | 1.97 m (6 ft 6 in) | 95 kg (209 lb) | 24 January 1988 | 23 years, 187 days | |
| 8 | Valentino Gallo | D | L | 1.93 m (6 ft 4 in) | 93 kg (205 lb) | 17 July 1985 | 26 years, 13 days | |
| 9 | Christian Presciutti | D | R | 1.85 m (6 ft 1 in) | 85 kg (187 lb) | 27 November 1982 | 28 years, 245 days | |
| 10 | Deni Fiorentini | CB | R | 1.91 m (6 ft 3 in) | 86 kg (190 lb) | 5 June 1984 | 27 years, 55 days | |
| 11 | Matteo Aicardi | CF | R | 1.92 m (6 ft 4 in) | 104 kg (229 lb) | 19 April 1986 | 25 years, 102 days | |
| 12 | Arnaldo Deserti | FP | R | 1.89 m (6 ft 2 in) | 100 kg (220 lb) | 18 April 1979 | 32 years, 103 days | |
| 13 | Giacomo Pastorino | GK | R | 1.91 m (6 ft 3 in) | 89 kg (196 lb) | 7 June 1980 | 31 years, 53 days | |
| Average | | | | 1.91 m (6 ft 3 in) | 91 kg (201 lb) | 22 April 1983 | 28 years, 99 days | |
| Coach | Alessandro Campagna | | | 1.82 m (6 ft 0 in) | | 26 June 1963 | 48 years, 34 days | 2019 |

Sources:

- Official Results Books (PDF): 2011 (Team Roster – Italy);
- ISHOF: "Honorees by Country".

Abbreviation

- MP – Matches played
- Min – Minutes
- G – Goals
- Sh – Shots
- AS – Assists
- TF – Turnover fouls
- ST – Steals
- BL – Blocked shots
- SP – Sprints
- 20S – 20 seconds exclusion
- Pen – Penalty
- EX – Exclusion

Statistics
| Cap No. | Player | Pos | MP | Minutes played | | Goals/Shots | | | AS | TF | ST | BL | Sprints | | | Personal fouls | | |
| Cap No. | Player | Pos | MP | Min | % | G | Sh | % | AS | TF | ST | BL | Won | SP | % | 20S | Pen | EX |
|---|---|---|---|---|---|---|---|---|---|---|---|---|---|---|---|---|---|---|
| 1 | Stefano Tempesti (C) | GK | 6 | 198 | 100% | | | | | | 9 | | | | | | 1 | |
| 2 | Amaurys Pérez | CB | 6 | 80 | 40.4% | 2 | 9 | 22.2% | 1 | 2 | | 2 | | | | 10 | | 1 |
| 3 | Niccolò Gitto | CB | 6 | 89 | 44.9% | 3 | 9 | 33.3% | 1 | 3 | 1 | 2 | | | | 9 | 1 | 2 |
| 4 | Pietro Figlioli | D | 6 | 134 | 67.7% | 7 | 27 | 25.9% | 7 | 9 | 3 | 4 | 15 | 15 | 100% | 3 | | |
| 5 | Alex Giorgetti | D | 6 | 111 | 56.1% | 8 | 20 | 40.0% | 2 | 3 | 7 | 1 | 1 | 2 | 50.0% | 3 | | |
| 6 | Maurizio Felugo | D | 6 | 141 | 71.2% | 6 | 19 | 31.6% | 2 | 8 | 7 | 1 | | | | 1 | | |
| 7 | Niccolò Figari | CB | 6 | 61 | 30.8% | 2 | 5 | 40.0% | 2 | 4 | 1 | 3 | | | | 8 | | 1 |
| 8 | Valentino Gallo | D | 6 | 130 | 65.7% | 7 | 24 | 29.2% | 5 | 6 | 1 | 5 | | | | 2 | | |
| 9 | Christian Presciutti | D | 6 | 152 | 76.8% | 8 | 13 | 61.5% | 4 | 5 | 5 | 1 | | | | 3 | | |
| 10 | Deni Fiorentini | CB | 6 | 102 | 51.5% | 3 | 8 | 37.5% | | 2 | 2 | 1 | 8 | 9 | 88.9% | 5 | 1 | |
| 11 | Matteo Aicardi | CF | 6 | 97 | 49.0% | 9 | 24 | 37.5% | | 21 | 4 | 1 | | | | 4 | | |
| 12 | Arnaldo Deserti | FP | 6 | 91 | 46.0% | 4 | 13 | 30.8% | | 10 | | 1 | | | | 7 | 1 | 1 |
| 13 | Giacomo Pastorino | GK | 6 | 0 | 0.0% | | | | | | | | | | | | | 1 |
| Team | | | | | | | | | | 2 | | | | | | | | |
| Total | | | 6 | 198 | 100% | 59 | 171 | 34.5% | 24 | 75 | 40 | 22 | 24 | 26 | 92.3% | 55 | 4 | 6 |
| Against | | | | | | 33 | 145 | 22.8% | 15 | 103 | 33 | 20 | 2 | 26 | 7.7% | 53 | 3 | 3 |

| Cap No. | Player | Pos | Saves/Shots | | |
| Cap No. | Player | Pos | Saves | Shots | % |
|---|---|---|---|---|---|
| 1 | Stefano Tempesti (C) | GK | 64 | 97 | 66.0% |
| 13 | Giacomo Pastorino | GK | | | |
| Total | | | 64 | 97 | 66.0% |

Source: Official Results Books (PDF): 2011 (Cumulative Statistics – Italy, p. 3).

=== 2009 (Serbia, 1st title) ===
- Edition of men's tournament: 13th
- Host city: Rome, Italy
- Number of participating teams: 16
- Competition format: Round-robin pools advanced teams to classification matches
- Champion: Serbia (1st title; 2nd place in preliminary C group)

Results
| Match | Round | Date | Cap color | Opponent | Result | Goals for | Goals against | Goals diff. |
|---|---|---|---|---|---|---|---|---|
| Match 1/7 | Preliminary round – Group C | 20 July 2009 | White | Spain | Lost | 9 | 11 | -2 |
| Match 2/7 | Preliminary round – Group C | 22 July 2009 | Blue | Kazakhstan | Won | 20 | 3 | 17 |
| Match 3/7 | Preliminary round – Group C | 24 July 2009 | White | Australia | Drawn | 8 | 8 | 0 |
| Match 4/7 | Quarter-final qualification | 26 July 2009 | White | Italy | Won | 7 | 5 | 2 |
| Match 5/7 | Quarter-finals | 28 July 2009 | Blue | Hungary | Won | 10 | 9 | 1 |
| Match 6/7 | Semi-finals | 30 July 2009 | White | Croatia | Won | 12 | 11 | 1 |
| Match 7/7 | Gold medal match | 1 August 2009 | White | Spain | Won | 14 | 13 | 1 |
| Total | Matches played: 7 • Wins: 5 • Ties: 1 • Defeats: 1 • Win %: 71.4% | | | | | 80 | 60 | 20 |

Source: Official Results Books (PDF): 2009 (Men's Competition Schedule, Men's Round Summary).

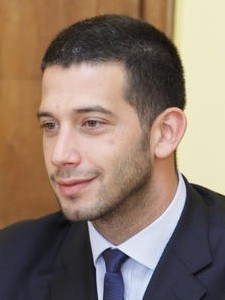
Vanja Udovičić, the captain of Serbia, won his second world title in 2009.

- Head coach: (Serbia) Dejan Udovičić (1st title as head coach)
- Assistant coach: (Serbia) Dejan Stanojević

Roster
| Cap No. | Player | Pos | L/R | Height | Weight | Date of birth | Age of winning gold | ISHOF member |
|---|---|---|---|---|---|---|---|---|
| 1 | Slobodan Soro | GK | R | 1.98 m (6 ft 6 in) | 100 kg (220 lb) | 23 December 1978 | 30 years, 221 days | |
| 2 | Marko Avramović | D | R | 1.88 m (6 ft 2 in) | 90 kg (198 lb) | 24 August 1986 | 22 years, 342 days | |
| 3 | Živko Gocić | D | R | 1.93 m (6 ft 4 in) | 96 kg (212 lb) | 22 August 1982 | 26 years, 344 days | |
| 4 | Vanja Udovičić (C) | CB | R | 1.93 m (6 ft 4 in) | 97 kg (214 lb) | 12 September 1982 | 26 years, 323 days | |
| 5 | Slavko Gak | D | R | 1.93 m (6 ft 4 in) | 95 kg (209 lb) | 9 June 1980 | 29 years, 53 days | |
| 6 | Duško Pijetlović | CF | R | 1.94 m (6 ft 4 in) | 93 kg (205 lb) | 25 April 1985 | 24 years, 98 days | |
| 7 | Slobodan Nikić | CF | R | 1.95 m (6 ft 5 in) | 103 kg (227 lb) | 25 January 1983 | 26 years, 188 days | |
| 8 | Milan Aleksić | CB | R | 1.92 m (6 ft 4 in) | 105 kg (231 lb) | 13 May 1986 | 23 years, 80 days | |
| 9 | Nikola Rađen | CB | R | 1.95 m (6 ft 5 in) | 99 kg (218 lb) | 29 January 1985 | 24 years, 184 days | |
| 10 | Filip Filipović | D | L | 1.95 m (6 ft 5 in) | 97 kg (214 lb) | 2 May 1987 | 22 years, 91 days | |
| 11 | Andrija Prlainović | D | R | 1.87 m (6 ft 2 in) | 92 kg (203 lb) | 28 April 1987 | 22 years, 95 days | |
| 12 | Stefan Mitrović | D | R | 1.90 m (6 ft 3 in) | 90 kg (198 lb) | 29 March 1988 | 21 years, 125 days | |
| 13 | Gojko Pijetlović | GK | R | 1.94 m (6 ft 4 in) | 95 kg (209 lb) | 7 August 1983 | 25 years, 359 days | |
| Average | | | | 1.93 m (6 ft 4 in) | 96 kg (212 lb) | 9 June 1984 | 25 years, 53 days | |
| Coach | Dejan Udovičić | | | | | 27 July 1970 | 39 years, 5 days | |

Note: Duško Pijetlović and Gojko Pijetlović are brothers.
Sources:

- Official Results Books (PDF): 2009 (Team Roster – Serbia);
- ISHOF: "Honorees by Country".

Abbreviation

- MP – Matches played
- Min – Minutes
- G – Goals
- Sh – Shots
- AS – Assists
- TF – Turnover fouls
- ST – Steals
- BL – Blocked shots
- SP – Sprints
- 20S – 20 seconds exclusion
- Pen – Penalty
- EX – Exclusion

Statistics
| Cap No. | Player | Pos | MP | Minutes played | | Goals/Shots | | | AS | TF | ST | BL | Sprints | | | Personal fouls | | |
| Cap No. | Player | Pos | MP | Min | % | G | Sh | % | AS | TF | ST | BL | Won | SP | % | 20S | Pen | EX |
|---|---|---|---|---|---|---|---|---|---|---|---|---|---|---|---|---|---|---|
| 1 | Slobodan Soro | GK | 7 | 220 | 93.2% | | | | | | 2 | | | | | | | |
| 2 | Marko Avramović | D | 7 | 63 | 26.7% | 0 | 4 | 0.0% | 1 | 1 | 1 | 2 | 1 | 1 | 100% | 3 | | |
| 3 | Živko Gocić | D | 7 | 188 | 79.7% | 4 | 16 | 25.0% | 9 | 6 | 11 | 6 | 2 | 6 | 33.3% | 9 | | 3 |
| 4 | Vanja Udovičić (C) | CB | 7 | 194 | 82.2% | 18 | 41 | 43.9% | 2 | 14 | 7 | 2 | | | | 12 | | 3 |
| 5 | Slavko Gak | D | 7 | 136 | 57.6% | 3 | 11 | 27.3% | 2 | 7 | 4 | | 10 | 17 | 58.8% | 10 | | |
| 6 | Duško Pijetlović | CF | 7 | 127 | 53.8% | 9 | 20 | 45.0% | | 18 | 3 | 3 | | | | 5 | 1 | 1 |
| 7 | Slobodan Nikić | CF | 7 | 104 | 44.1% | 2 | 11 | 18.2% | | 21 | 1 | 1 | | | | 6 | 2 | 1 |
| 8 | Milan Aleksić | CB | 7 | 101 | 42.8% | 8 | 15 | 53.3% | | 1 | 2 | 1 | | | | 11 | 3 | 2 |
| 9 | Nikola Rađen | CB | 7 | 95 | 40.3% | 2 | 7 | 28.6% | 1 | 4 | 3 | | | | | 12 | 2 | 1 |
| 10 | Filip Filipović | D | 7 | 184 | 78.0% | 20 | 47 | 42.6% | 13 | 12 | 7 | 2 | 3 | 5 | 60.0% | 7 | | |
| 11 | Andrija Prlainović | D | 7 | 210 | 89.0% | 12 | 33 | 36.4% | 4 | 11 | 8 | 2 | | | | 5 | 1 | |
| 12 | Stefan Mitrović | D | 7 | 14 | 5.9% | 2 | 3 | 66.7% | | | | | 0 | 3 | 0.0% | | | |
| 13 | Gojko Pijetlović | GK | 7 | 16 | 6.8% | | | | | 1 | | | | | | | | |
| Team | | | | | | | | | | 3 | | | | | | | | |
| Total | | | 7 | 236 | 100% | 80 | 208 | 38.5% | 32 | 99 | 49 | 19 | 16 | 32 | 50.0% | 80 | 9 | 11 |
| Against | | | | | | 60 | 204 | 29.4% | 15 | 112 | 45 | 11 | 16 | 32 | 50.0% | 76 | 5 | 6 |

| Cap No. | Player | Pos | Saves/Shots | | |
| Cap No. | Player | Pos | Saves | Shots | % |
|---|---|---|---|---|---|
| 1 | Slobodan Soro | GK | 77 | 136 | 56.6% |
| 13 | Gojko Pijetlović | GK | 5 | 6 | 83.3% |
| Total | | | 82 | 142 | 57.7% |

Source: Official Results Books (PDF): 2009 (Cumulative Statistics – Serbia, p. 2).

=== 2007 (Croatia, 1st title) ===
- Edition of men's tournament: 12th
- Host city: Melbourne, Australia
- Number of participating teams: 16
- Competition format: Round-robin pools advanced teams to classification matches
- Champion: Croatia (1st title; 1st place in preliminary B group)

Results
| Match | Round | Date | Cap color | Opponent | Result | Goals for | Goals against | Goals diff. |
|---|---|---|---|---|---|---|---|---|
| Match 1/6 | Preliminary round – Group B | 20 March 2007 | White | South Africa | Won | 13 | 5 | 8 |
| Match 2/6 | Preliminary round – Group B | 22 March 2007 | White | Australia | Won | 10 | 9 | 1 |
| Match 3/6 | Preliminary round – Group B | 24 March 2007 | White | United States | Won | 10 | 8 | 2 |
| Match 4/6 | Quarter-finals | 28 March 2007 | White | Russia | Won | 13 | 3 | 10 |
| Match 5/6 | Semi-finals | 30 March 2007 | Blue | Serbia | Won | 10 | 7 | 3 |
| Match 6/6 | Gold medal match | 1 April 2007 | White | Hungary | Won | 9 | 8 | 1 |
| Total | Matches played: 6 • Wins: 6 • Ties: 0 • Defeats: 0 • Win %: 100% | | | | | 65 | 40 | 25 |

Source: Official Results Books (PDF): 2007 (Men's Round Summary).

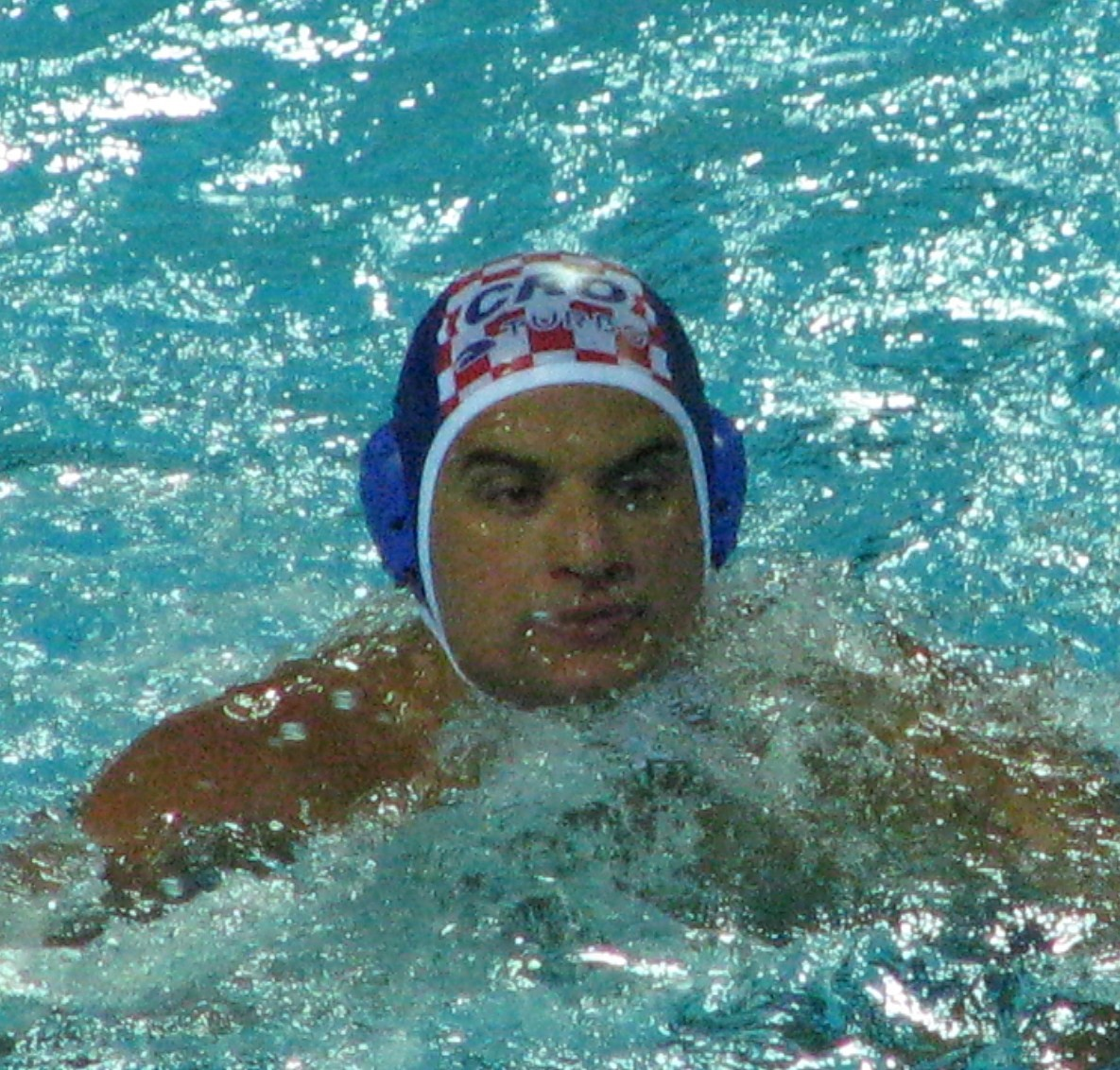
Miho Bošković scored 11 goals at the 2007 World Aquatics Championships, helping Croatia win gold.

- Head coach: (Croatia) Ratko Rudić (3rd title as head coach)
- Assistant coaches: (Croatia) Milorad Damjanić

Roster
| Cap No. | Player | Pos | L/R | Height | Weight | Date of birth | Age of winning gold | ISHOF member |
|---|---|---|---|---|---|---|---|---|
| 1 | Frano Vićan | GK | R | 1.92 m (6 ft 4 in) | 94 kg (207 lb) | 24 January 1976 | 31 years, 67 days | |
| 2 | Damir Burić | CB | R | 2.05 m (6 ft 9 in) | 115 kg (254 lb) | 2 December 1980 | 26 years, 120 days | |
| 3 | Andro Bušlje | CB | R | 1.99 m (6 ft 6 in) | 115 kg (254 lb) | 4 January 1986 | 21 years, 87 days | |
| 4 | Zdeslav Vrdoljak (C) | D | R | 1.89 m (6 ft 2 in) | 96 kg (212 lb) | 15 March 1971 | 36 years, 17 days | |
| 5 | Aljoša Kunac | CB | R | 1.97 m (6 ft 6 in) | 100 kg (220 lb) | 18 August 1980 | 26 years, 226 days | |
| 6 | Maro Joković | D | L | 2.03 m (6 ft 8 in) | 95 kg (209 lb) | 1 October 1987 | 19 years, 182 days | |
| 7 | Mile Smodlaka | CF | R | 1.98 m (6 ft 6 in) | 115 kg (254 lb) | 1 January 1976 | 31 years, 90 days | |
| 8 | Teo Đogaš | D | R | 1.87 m (6 ft 2 in) | 90 kg (198 lb) | 19 February 1977 | 30 years, 41 days | |
| 9 | Pavo Marković | D | R | 1.90 m (6 ft 3 in) | 92 kg (203 lb) | 20 April 1985 | 21 years, 346 days | |
| 10 | Samir Barać | D | R | 1.88 m (6 ft 2 in) | 95 kg (209 lb) | 2 November 1973 | 33 years, 150 days | |
| 11 | Igor Hinić | CF | R | 2.02 m (6 ft 8 in) | 110 kg (243 lb) | 4 December 1975 | 31 years, 118 days | |
| 12 | Miho Bošković | D | R | 1.96 m (6 ft 5 in) | 96 kg (212 lb) | 11 January 1983 | 24 years, 80 days | |
| 13 | Josip Pavić | GK | R | 1.95 m (6 ft 5 in) | 90 kg (198 lb) | 15 January 1982 | 25 years, 76 days | |
| Average | | | | 1.95 m (6 ft 5 in) | 100 kg (220 lb) | 6 September 1979 | 27 years, 207 days | |
| Coach | Ratko Rudić | | | 1.88 m (6 ft 2 in) | | 7 June 1948 | 58 years, 298 days | 2007 |

Sources:

- Official Results Books (PDF): 2007 (Start Lists – Croatia: match 02, match 16, match 19, match 36, match 43, match 48);
- ISHOF: "Honorees by Country".

Abbreviation

- MP – Matches played
- Min – Minutes
- G – Goals
- Sh – Shots
- AS – Assists
- TF – Turnover fouls
- ST – Steals
- BL – Blocked shots
- SP – Sprints
- 20S – 20 seconds exclusion
- Pen – Penalty
- EX – Exclusion

Statistics
| Cap No. | Player | Pos | MP | Minutes played | | Goals/Shots | | | AS | TF | ST | BL | Sprints | | | Personal fouls | | |
| Cap No. | Player | Pos | MP | Min | % | G | Sh | % | AS | TF | ST | BL | Won | SP | % | 20S | Pen | EX |
|---|---|---|---|---|---|---|---|---|---|---|---|---|---|---|---|---|---|---|
| 1 | Frano Vićan | GK | 6 | 182 | 91.9% | | | | 1 | | 1 | | | | | | | |
| 2 | Damir Burić | CB | 6 | 109 | 55.1% | 6 | 16 | 37.5% | 4 | 6 | 7 | 2 | | | | 9 | | 1 |
| 3 | Andro Bušlje | CB | 6 | 85 | 42.9% | 2 | 11 | 18.2% | | 4 | 6 | 2 | | | | 10 | | 1 |
| 4 | Zdeslav Vrdoljak (C) | D | 6 | 116 | 58.6% | 12 | 19 | 63.2% | 9 | 4 | 7 | 6 | | | | 7 | | |
| 5 | Aljoša Kunac | CB | 6 | 85 | 42.9% | 1 | 11 | 9.1% | 6 | 4 | 5 | 3 | | | | 6 | 2 | 1 |
| 6 | Maro Joković | D | 6 | 114 | 57.6% | 8 | 17 | 47.1% | 8 | 2 | 2 | 2 | 5 | 15 | 33.3% | 4 | | |
| 7 | Mile Smodlaka | CF | 6 | 89 | 44.9% | 5 | 11 | 45.5% | | 18 | 1 | 1 | | | | 5 | | 1 |
| 8 | Teo Đogaš | D | 6 | 116 | 58.6% | 7 | 14 | 50.0% | 8 | 3 | 4 | 2 | 1 | 2 | 50.0% | 1 | 1 | |
| 9 | Pavo Marković | D | 6 | 115 | 58.1% | 5 | 11 | 45.5% | 4 | 7 | 2 | 2 | 0 | 4 | 0.0% | 11 | | 1 |
| 10 | Samir Barać | D | 6 | 130 | 65.7% | 7 | 24 | 29.2% | 6 | 2 | 5 | 1 | | | | 6 | | |
| 11 | Igor Hinić | CF | 6 | 105 | 53.0% | 1 | 6 | 16.7% | 2 | 22 | 5 | 1 | | | | 5 | 1 | |
| 12 | Miho Bošković | D | 6 | 101 | 51.0% | 11 | 26 | 42.3% | 6 | 5 | 5 | 3 | 4 | 5 | 80.0% | 3 | | |
| 13 | Josip Pavić | GK | 6 | 16 | 8.1% | | | | | | | | | | | | | |
| Team | | | | | | | | | | 6 | | | | | | | | |
| Total | | | 6 | 198 | 100% | 65 | 166 | 39.2% | 54 | 83 | 50 | 25 | 10 | 26 | 38.5% | 67 | 4 | 5 |
| Against | | | | | | 40 | 153 | 26.1% | 23 | 102 | 36 | 13 | 16 | 26 | 61.5% | 65 | 1 | 5 |

| Cap No. | Player | Pos | Saves/Shots | | |
| Cap No. | Player | Pos | Saves | Shots | % |
|---|---|---|---|---|---|
| 1 | Frano Vićan | GK | 45 | 81 | 55.6% |
| 13 | Josip Pavić | GK | 8 | 12 | 66.7% |
| Total | | | 53 | 93 | 57.0% |

Source: Official Results Books (PDF): 2007 (Results – Croatia: match 02, match 16, match 19, match 36, match 43, match 48).

=== 2005 (Serbia and Montenegro, 1st title) ===
- Edition of men's tournament: 11th
- Host city: Montreal, Canada
- Number of participating teams: 16
- Competition format: Round-robin pools advanced teams to classification matches
- Champion: Serbia and Montenegro (1st title; 1st place in preliminary B group)

Results
| Match | Round | Date | Opponent | Result | Goals for | Goals against | Goals diff. |
|---|---|---|---|---|---|---|---|
| Match 1/6 | Preliminary round – Group B | 18 July 2005 | Cuba | Won | 21 | 1 | 20 |
| Match 2/6 | Preliminary round – Group B | 20 July 2005 | Japan | Won | 17 | 5 | 12 |
| Match 3/6 | Preliminary round – Group B | 22 July 2005 | United States | Won | 8 | 4 | 4 |
| Match 4/6 | Quarter-finals | 26 July 2005 | Romania | Won | 10 | 8 | 2 |
| Match 5/6 | Semi-finals | 28 July 2005 | Croatia | Won | 5 | 4 | 1 |
| Match 6/6 | Gold medal match | 30 July 2005 | Hungary | Won | 8 | 7 | 1 |
| Total | Matches played: 6 • Wins: 6 • Ties: 0 • Defeats: 0 • Win %: 100% | | | | 69 | 29 | 40 |

Sources:

- Official Reports (FINA) (PDF): "World Championship" (p. 15);
- Todor66: "2005 World Championship (men's tournament)".

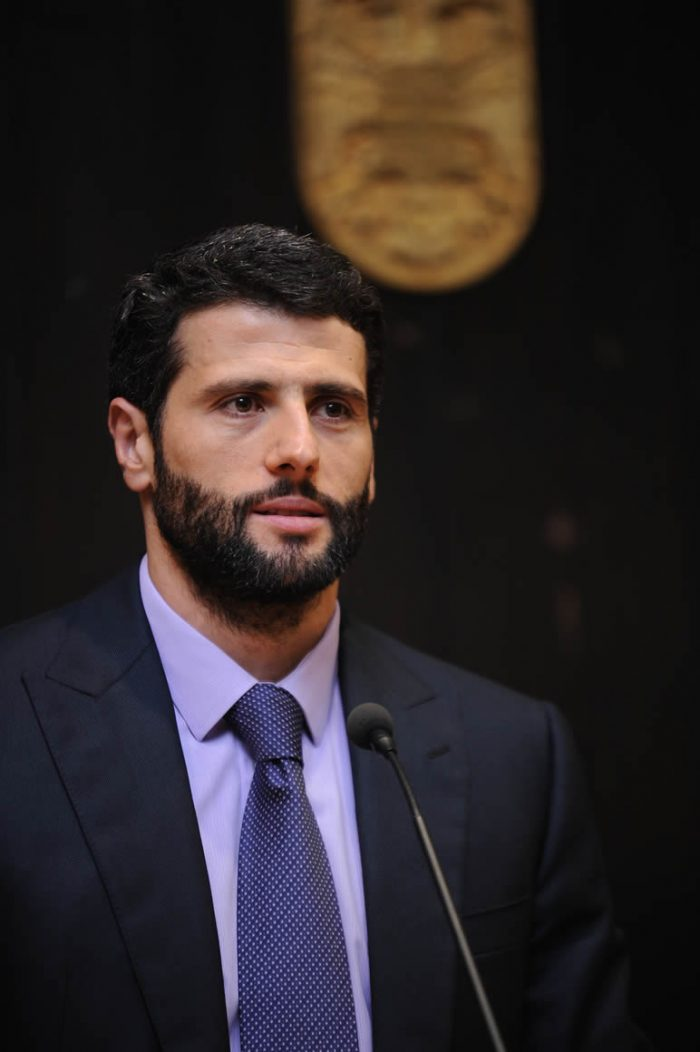
Aleksandar Šapić, representing Serbia and Montenegro, won world title in 2005.

- Head coach: (Serbia and Montenegro) Petar Porobić (1st title as head coach)
- Assistant coaches: (Serbia and Montenegro) Mirko Blazedic

Roster
| Cap No. | Player | Pos | L/R | Height | Weight | Date of birth | Age of winning gold | ISHOF member |
|---|---|---|---|---|---|---|---|---|
| 1 | Denis Šefik | GK | R | 1.98 m (6 ft 6 in) | 96 kg (212 lb) | 20 September 1976 | 28 years, 313 days | |
| 2 | Petar Trbojević | D | R | 1.97 m (6 ft 6 in) | 94 kg (207 lb) | 9 September 1973 | 31 years, 324 days | |
| 3 | Nikola Janović | D | R | 1.91 m (6 ft 3 in) | 100 kg (220 lb) | 22 March 1980 | 25 years, 130 days | |
| 4 | Vanja Udovičić | D | R | 1.93 m (6 ft 4 in) | 94 kg (207 lb) | 12 September 1982 | 22 years, 321 days | |
| 5 | Dejan Savić | CB | R | 1.90 m (6 ft 3 in) | 104 kg (229 lb) | 24 April 1975 | 30 years, 97 days | |
| 6 | Danilo Ikodinović | D | R | 1.88 m (6 ft 2 in) | 89 kg (196 lb) | 4 October 1976 | 28 years, 299 days | |
| 7 | Slobodan Nikić | CF | R | 1.95 m (6 ft 5 in) | 94 kg (207 lb) | 25 January 1983 | 22 years, 186 days | |
| 8 | Vladimir Gojković | D | R | 1.88 m (6 ft 2 in) | 92 kg (203 lb) | 29 January 1981 | 24 years, 182 days | |
| 9 | Boris Zloković | CF | R | 1.97 m (6 ft 6 in) | 100 kg (220 lb) | 16 March 1983 | 22 years, 136 days | |
| 10 | Aleksandar Šapić | D | R | 1.88 m (6 ft 2 in) | 96 kg (212 lb) | 1 June 1978 | 27 years, 59 days | |
| 11 | Vladimir Vujasinović (C) | CB | R | 1.87 m (6 ft 2 in) | 98 kg (216 lb) | 14 August 1973 | 31 years, 350 days | |
| 12 | Predrag Jokić | CB | R | 1.88 m (6 ft 2 in) | 81 kg (179 lb) | 3 February 1983 | 22 years, 177 days | |
| 13 | Zdravko Radić | GK | R | 1.93 m (6 ft 4 in) | 95 kg (209 lb) | 24 June 1979 | 26 years, 36 days | |
| Average | | | | 1.92 m (6 ft 4 in) | 95 kg (209 lb) | 10 January 1979 | 26 years, 201 days | |
| Coach | Petar Porobić | | | | | 28 May 1957 | 48 years, 63 days | |

Sources:

- Official Reports (FINA) (PDF): "World Champions–Team Line-up" (p. 17);
- Olympedia: "Olympians Who Won a Medal at the World Aquatics Championships";
- ISHOF: "Honorees by Country".

=== 2003 (Hungary, 2nd title) ===
- Edition of men's tournament: 10th
- Host city: Barcelona, Spain
- Number of participating teams: 16
- Competition format: Round-robin pools advanced teams to classification matches
- Champion: Hungary (2nd title; 1st place in preliminary A group)

Results
| Match | Round | Date | Opponent | Result | Goals for | Goals against | Goals diff. |
|---|---|---|---|---|---|---|---|
| Match 1/6 | Preliminary round – Group A | 14 July 2003 | Croatia | Drawn | 7 | 7 | 0 |
| Match 2/6 | Preliminary round – Group A | 16 July 2003 | Romania | Won | 9 | 5 | 4 |
| Match 3/6 | Preliminary round – Group A | 18 July 2003 | Canada | Won | 13 | 3 | 10 |
| Match 4/6 | Quarter-finals | 22 July 2003 | Slovakia | Won | 13 | 5 | 8 |
| Match 5/6 | Semi-finals | 24 July 2003 | Greece | Won | 9 | 8 | 1 |
| Match 6/6 | Gold medal match | 26 July 2003 | Italy | Won | 11 | 9 | 2 |
| Total | Matches played: 6 • Wins: 5 • Ties: 1 • Defeats: 0 • Win %: 83.3% | | | | 62 | 37 | 25 |

Sources:

- Official Reports (FINA) (PDF): "World Championship" (p. 15);
- Todor66: "2003 World Championship (men's tournament)".
- Head coach: (Hungary) Dénes Kemény (1st title as head coach)

Roster
| Cap No. | Player | Pos | L/R | Height | Weight | Date of birth | Age of winning gold | ISHOF member |
|---|---|---|---|---|---|---|---|---|
| 1 | Zoltán Szécsi | GK | R | 1.98 m (6 ft 6 in) | 93 kg (205 lb) | 22 December 1977 | 25 years, 216 days | 2016 |
| 2 | Tamás Varga | CB | R | 2.01 m (6 ft 7 in) | 105 kg (231 lb) | 14 July 1975 | 28 years, 12 days | |
| 3 | Norbert Madaras | D | L | 1.91 m (6 ft 3 in) | 87 kg (192 lb) | 1 December 1979 | 23 years, 237 days | |
| 4 | Zsolt Varga | CF | R | 1.97 m (6 ft 6 in) | | 24 May 1978 | 25 years, 63 days | |
| 5 | Tamás Kásás | D | R | 2.00 m (6 ft 7 in) | 90 kg (198 lb) | 20 July 1976 | 27 years, 6 days | 2016 |
| 6 | Attila Vári | CB | R | 2.00 m (6 ft 7 in) | 93 kg (205 lb) | 26 February 1976 | 27 years, 150 days | |
| 7 | Gergely Kiss | D | L | 1.99 m (6 ft 6 in) | 100 kg (220 lb) | 21 September 1977 | 25 years, 308 days | 2016 |
| 8 | Tibor Benedek (C) | D | L | 1.90 m (6 ft 3 in) | 96 kg (212 lb) | 12 July 1972 | 31 years, 14 days | 2016 |
| 9 | Rajmund Fodor | D | R | 1.90 m (6 ft 3 in) | 94 kg (207 lb) | 21 February 1976 | 27 years, 155 days | |
| 10 | István Gergely | GK | R | 2.01 m (6 ft 7 in) | 110 kg (243 lb) | 20 August 1976 | 26 years, 340 days | |
| 11 | Barnabás Steinmetz | CB | R | 1.96 m (6 ft 5 in) | 98 kg (216 lb) | 6 October 1975 | 27 years, 293 days | |
| 12 | Tamás Molnár | CF | R | 1.93 m (6 ft 4 in) | 98 kg (216 lb) | 2 August 1975 | 27 years, 358 days | 2016 |
| 13 | Péter Biros | D | R | 1.94 m (6 ft 4 in) | 95 kg (209 lb) | 5 April 1976 | 27 years, 112 days | 2016 |
| Average | | | | 1.96 m (6 ft 5 in) | 97 kg (214 lb) | 27 January 1976 | 27 years, 180 days | |
| Coach | Dénes Kemény | | | | | 14 June 1954 | 49 years, 42 days | 2011 |

Sources:

- Official Reports (FINA) (PDF): "World Champions–Team Line-up" (p. 17);
- Olympedia: "Olympians Who Won a Medal at the World Aquatics Championships";
- ISHOF: "Honorees by Country".

=== 2001 (Spain, 2nd title) ===
- Edition of men's tournament: 9th
- Host city: Fukuoka, Japan
- Number of participating teams: 16
- Competition format: Round-robin pools advanced teams to the round-robin quarter-final pool; round-robin quarter-final pools advanced teams to classification matches
- Champion: Spain (2nd title; 1st place in preliminary D group; 1st place in quarter-final F group)

Results
| Match | Round | Date | Opponent | Result | Goals for | Goals against | Goals diff. |
|---|---|---|---|---|---|---|---|
| Match 1/8 | Preliminary round – Group D | 19 July 2001 | Australia | Won | 8 | 1 | 7 |
| Match 2/8 | Preliminary round – Group D | 21 July 2001 | Japan | Won | 12 | 1 | 11 |
| Match 3/8 | Preliminary round – Group D | 22 July 2001 | Croatia | Won | 6 | 4 | 2 |
| Match 4/8 | Quarter-final round – Group F | 24 July 2001 | United States | Won | 10 | 4 | 6 |
| Match 5/8 | Quarter-final round – Group F | 25 July 2001 | Netherlands | Won | 10 | 5 | 5 |
| Match 6/8 | Quarter-final round – Group F | 26 July 2001 | Russia | Won | 9 | 8 | 1 |
| Match 7/8 | Semi-finals | 28 July 2001 | Italy | Won | 4 | 2 | 2 |
| Match 8/8 | Gold medal match | 29 July 2001 | Yugoslavia | Won | 4 | 2 | 2 |
| Total | Matches played: 8 • Wins: 8 • Ties: 0 • Defeats: 0 • Win %: 100% | | | | 63 | 27 | 36 |

Sources:

- Official Reports (FINA) (PDF): "World Championship" (p. 15);
- Todor66: "2001 World Championship (men's tournament)".
- Head coach: (Spain) Juan Jané (2nd title as head coach)

Roster
| # | Player | Pos | L/R | Height | Weight | Date of birth | Age of winning gold | ISHOF member |
|---|---|---|---|---|---|---|---|---|
| P1 | Ángel Andreo | GK | R | 1.91 m (6 ft 3 in) | 83 kg (183 lb) | 3 December 1972 | 28 years, 238 days | |
| P2 | Daniel Ballart | CB | R | 1.78 m (5 ft 10 in) | 73 kg (161 lb) | 17 March 1973 | 28 years, 134 days | |
| P3 | Salvador Gómez | CB | R | 1.94 m (6 ft 4 in) | 96 kg (212 lb) | 11 March 1968 | 33 years, 140 days | |
| P4 | Gabriel Hernández | D | R | 1.85 m (6 ft 1 in) | 84 kg (185 lb) | 2 January 1975 | 26 years, 208 days | |
| P5 | Gustavo Marcos | CB | R | 1.80 m (5 ft 11 in) | 95 kg (209 lb) | 23 December 1972 | 28 years, 218 days | |
| P6 | Guillermo Molina | D | R | 1.95 m (6 ft 5 in) | 90 kg (198 lb) | 16 March 1984 | 17 years, 135 days | |
| P7 | Daniel Moro | D | R | 1.88 m (6 ft 2 in) | 86 kg (190 lb) | 8 August 1973 | 27 years, 355 days | |
| P8 | Iván Moro | CB | R | 1.86 m (6 ft 1 in) | 84 kg (185 lb) | 25 December 1974 | 26 years, 216 days | |
| P9 | Sergi Pedrerol | D | L | 1.90 m (6 ft 3 in) | 78 kg (172 lb) | 16 December 1969 | 31 years, 225 days | |
| P10 | Iván Pérez | CF | L | 1.97 m (6 ft 6 in) | 109 kg (240 lb) | 29 June 1971 | 30 years, 30 days | |
| P11 | Jesús Rollán (C) | GK | R | 1.87 m (6 ft 2 in) | 87 kg (192 lb) | 4 April 1968 | 33 years, 116 days | 2012 |
| P12 | Javier Sánchez | CF | R | 1.93 m (6 ft 4 in) | 85 kg (187 lb) | 16 June 1975 | 26 years, 43 days | |
| P13 | Carles Sanz | D | | 1.77 m (5 ft 10 in) | 88 kg (194 lb) | 25 May 1975 | 26 years, 65 days | |
| Average | | | | 1.88 m (6 ft 2 in) | 88 kg (194 lb) | 6 July 1973 | 28 years, 23 days | |
| Coach | Juan Jané | | | 1.87 m (6 ft 2 in) | | 31 May 1953 | 48 years, 59 days | |

Note: Daniel Moro and Iván Moro are brothers.
Sources:

- Official Reports (FINA) (PDF): "World Champions–Team Line-up" (p. 17);
- Olympedia: "Olympians Who Won a Medal at the World Aquatics Championships";
- ISHOF: "Honorees by Country".

=== 1998 (Spain, 1st title) ===
- Edition of men's tournament: 8th
- Host city: Perth, Australia
- Number of participating teams: 16
- Competition format: Round-robin pools advanced teams to the round-robin quarter-final pool; round-robin quarter-final pools advanced teams to classification matches
- Champion: Spain (1st title; 1st place in preliminary C group; 1st place in quarter-final F group)

Results
| Match | Round | Date | Opponent | Result | Goals for | Goals against | Goals diff. |
|---|---|---|---|---|---|---|---|
| Match 1/8 | Preliminary round – Group C | 9 January 1998 | South Africa | Won | 13 | 3 | 10 |
| Match 2/8 | Preliminary round – Group C | 10 January 1998 | Greece | Won | 7 | 6 | 1 |
| Match 3/8 | Preliminary round – Group C | 11 January 1998 | Brazil | Won | 9 | 3 | 6 |
| Match 4/8 | Quarter-final round – Group F | 13 January 1998 | Slovakia | Won | 15 | 8 | 7 |
| Match 5/8 | Quarter-final round – Group F | 14 January 1998 | United States | Won | 5 | 4 | 1 |
| Match 6/8 | Quarter-final round – Group F | 15 January 1998 | Australia | Won | 5 | 4 | 1 |
| Match 7/8 | Semi-finals | 17 January 1998 | Yugoslavia | Won | 5 | 3 | 2 |
| Match 8/8 | Gold medal match | 18 January 1998 | Hungary | Won | 6 | 4 | 2 |
| Total | Matches played: 8 • Wins: 8 • Ties: 0 • Defeats: 0 • Win %: 100% | | | | 65 | 35 | 30 |

Sources:

- Official Reports (FINA) (PDF): "World Championship" (p. 15);
- Todor66: "1998 World Championship (men's tournament)".

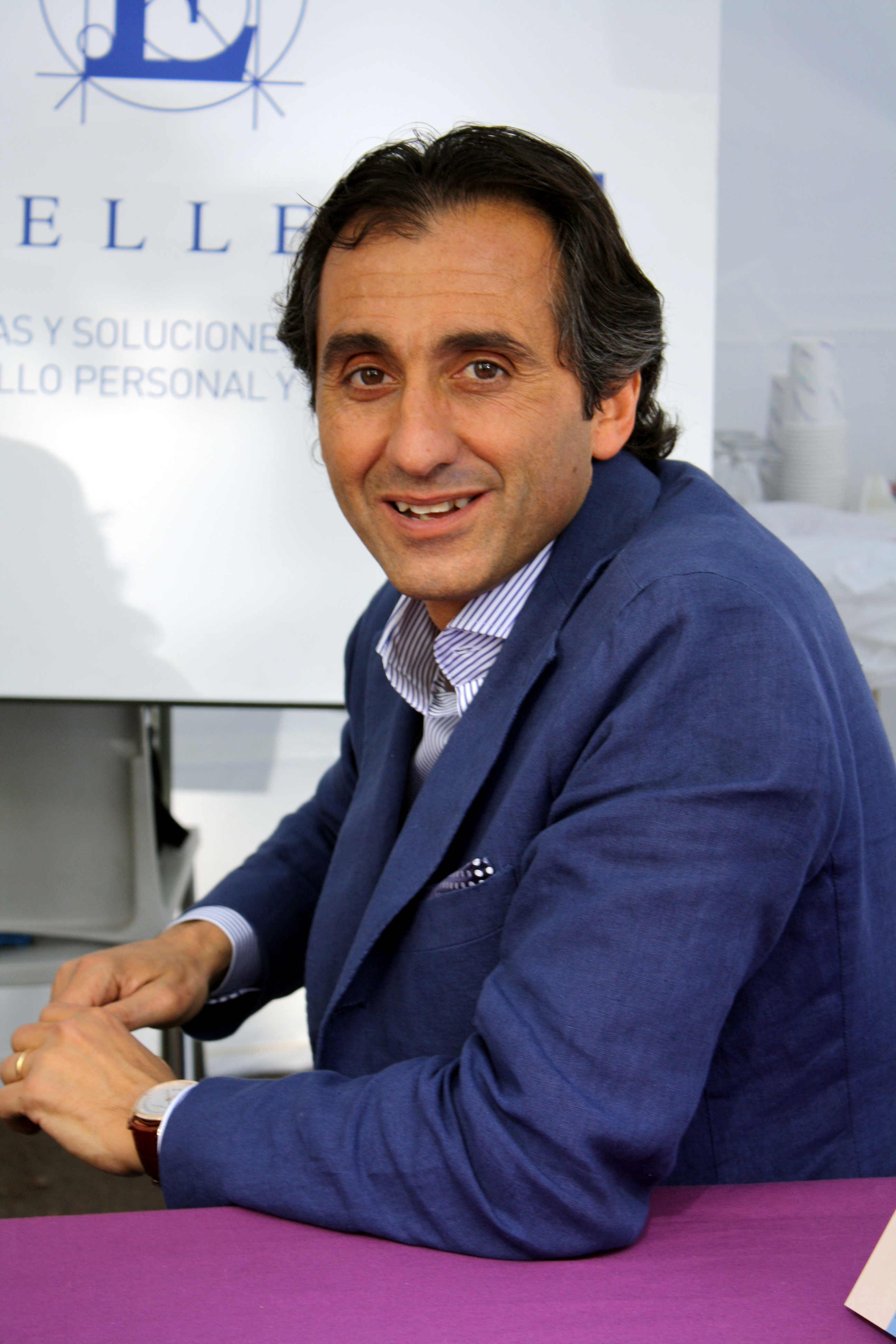
36-year-old Manuel Estiarte, the captain of Spain, won world title in 1998.

- Head coach: (Spain) Juan Jané (1st title as head coach)

Roster
| # | Player | Pos | L/R | Height | Weight | Date of birth | Age of winning gold | ISHOF member |
|---|---|---|---|---|---|---|---|---|
| P1 | Daniel Ballart | CB | R | 1.78 m (5 ft 10 in) | 73 kg (161 lb) | 17 March 1973 | 24 years, 307 days | |
| P2 | Manuel Estiarte (C) | D | R | 1.78 m (5 ft 10 in) | 62 kg (137 lb) | 26 October 1961 | 36 years, 84 days | 2007 |
| P3 | Pedro García | D | | 1.93 m (6 ft 4 in) | 83 kg (183 lb) | 9 December 1968 | 29 years, 40 days | |
| P4 | Salvador Gómez | CB | R | 1.94 m (6 ft 4 in) | 96 kg (212 lb) | 11 March 1968 | 29 years, 313 days | |
| P5 | Miguel Gonzales | GK | | | | | | |
| P6 | Gustavo Marcos | CB | R | 1.80 m (5 ft 11 in) | 95 kg (209 lb) | 23 December 1972 | 25 years, 26 days | |
| P7 | Rubén Michavila | FP | | | | 11 May 1970 | 27 years, 252 days | |
| P8 | Iván Moro | CB | R | 1.86 m (6 ft 1 in) | 84 kg (185 lb) | 25 December 1974 | 23 years, 24 days | |
| P9 | Sergi Pedrerol | D | L | 1.90 m (6 ft 3 in) | 78 kg (172 lb) | 16 December 1969 | 28 years, 33 days | |
| P10 | Iván Pérez | CF | L | 1.97 m (6 ft 6 in) | 109 kg (240 lb) | 29 June 1971 | 26 years, 203 days | |
| P11 | Jesús Rollán | GK | R | 1.87 m (6 ft 2 in) | 87 kg (192 lb) | 4 April 1968 | 29 years, 289 days | 2012 |
| P12 | Jordi Sans | CF | | 1.80 m (5 ft 11 in) | 70 kg (154 lb) | 3 August 1965 | 32 years, 168 days | |
| P13 | Carles Sanz | D | | 1.77 m (5 ft 10 in) | 88 kg (194 lb) | 25 May 1975 | 22 years, 238 days | |
| Average | | | | 1.85 m (6 ft 1 in) (Note: Average height of 11 players.) | 84 kg (185 lb) (Note: Average weight of 11 players.) | 5 February 1970 | 27 years, 347 days (Note: Average age of 12 players.) | |
| Coach | Juan Jané | | | 1.87 m (6 ft 2 in) | | 31 May 1953 | 44 years, 232 days | |

Sources:

- Official Reports (FINA) (PDF): "World Champions–Team Line-up" (p. 17);
- Olympedia: "Olympians Who Won a Medal at the World Aquatics Championships";
- ISHOF: "Honorees by Country".

=== 1994 (Italy, 2nd title) ===
- Edition of men's tournament: 7th
- Host city: Rome, Italy
- Number of participating teams: 16
- Competition format: Round-robin pools advanced teams to the round-robin quarter-final pool; round-robin quarter-final pools advanced teams to classification matches
- Champion: Italy (2nd title; 1st place in preliminary D group; 1st place in quarter-final F group)

Results
| Match | Round | Date | Opponent | Result | Goals for | Goals against | Goals diff. |
|---|---|---|---|---|---|---|---|
| Match 1/7 | Preliminary round – Group D | 2 September 1994 | Kazakhstan | Won | 13 | 7 | 6 |
| Match 2/7 | Preliminary round – Group D | 3 September 1994 | Hungary | Won | 11 | 10 | 1 |
| Match 3/7 | Preliminary round – Group D | 4 September 1994 | Canada | Won | 9 | 2 | 7 |
| Match 4/7 | Quarter-final round – Group F | 6 September 1994 | Russia | Won | 7 | 6 | 1 |
| Match 5/7 | Quarter-final round – Group F | 7 September 1994 | Greece | Won | 7 | 4 | 3 |
| Match 6/7 | Semi-finals | 9 September 1994 | Croatia | Won | 8 | 5 | 3 |
| Match 7/7 | Gold medal match | 10 September 1994 | Spain | Won | 10 | 5 | 5 |
| Total | Matches played: 7 • Wins: 7 • Ties: 0 • Defeats: 0 • Win %: 100% | | | | 65 | 39 | 26 |

Sources:

- Official Reports (FINA) (PDF): "World Championship" (p. 15);
- Todor66: "1994 World Championship (men's tournament)".
- Head coach: (Croatia) Ratko Rudić (2nd title as head coach)

Roster
| Cap No. | Player | Pos | L/R | Height | Weight | Date of birth | Age of winning gold | Goals | ISHOF member |
|---|---|---|---|---|---|---|---|---|---|
| 1 | Francesco Attolico | GK | | 1.93 m (6 ft 4 in) | 85 kg (187 lb) | 23 March 1963 | 31 years, 171 days | 0 | |
| 2 | Marco D'Altrui | FP | | 1.80 m (5 ft 11 in) | 72 kg (159 lb) | 25 April 1964 | 30 years, 138 days | 2 | 2010 |
| 3 | Alessandro Bovo | FP | | 1.85 m (6 ft 1 in) | 78 kg (172 lb) | 1 January 1969 | 25 years, 252 days | 2 | |
| 4 | Pino Porzio | FP | | | | 26 February 1967 | 27 years, 196 days | 7 | |
| 5 | Alessandro Campagna | FP | R | 1.82 m (6 ft 0 in) | 80 kg (176 lb) | 26 June 1963 | 31 years, 76 days | 10 | 2019 |
| 6 | Roberto Calcaterra | FP | | 1.86 m (6 ft 1 in) | 90 kg (198 lb) | 6 February 1972 | 22 years, 216 days | 1 | |
| 7 | Mario Fiorillo | FP | | 1.79 m (5 ft 10 in) | 70 kg (154 lb) | 16 December 1962 | 31 years, 268 days | 2 | |
| 8 | Francesco Porzio | FP | L | 1.85 m (6 ft 1 in) | 83 kg (183 lb) | 26 January 1966 | 28 years, 227 days | 12 | |
| 9 | Amedeo Pomilio | FP | L | 1.78 m (5 ft 10 in) | 74 kg (163 lb) | 11 February 1967 | 27 years, 211 days | 9 | |
| 10 | Ferdinando Gandolfi | FP | | | | 5 January 1967 | 27 years, 248 days | 8 | |
| 11 | Massimiliano Ferretti | FP | | 1.94 m (6 ft 4 in) | 85 kg (187 lb) | 22 June 1966 | 28 years, 80 days | 6 | |
| 12 | Carlo Silipo | FP | R | 1.99 m (6 ft 6 in) | 95 kg (209 lb) | 10 September 1971 | 23 years, 0 days | 6 | |
| 13 | Gianni Averaimo | GK | | 1.83 m (6 ft 0 in) | 84 kg (185 lb) | 10 September 1964 | 30 years, 0 days | 0 | |
| Average | | | | 1.86 m (6 ft 1 in) | 81 kg (179 lb) | 24 July 1966 | 28 years, 48 days | 65 | |
| Coach | Ratko Rudić | | | 1.88 m (6 ft 2 in) | | 7 June 1948 | 46 years, 95 days | | 2007 |

Note: Francesco Porzio and Pino Porzio are brothers.
Sources:

- Official Reports (FINA) (PDF): "World Champions–Team Line-up" (p. 17);
- Olympedia: "Olympians Who Won a Medal at the World Aquatics Championships";
- Todor66: "1994 World Championship (men's tournament)";
- ISHOF: "Honorees by Country".

=== 1991 (Yugoslavia, 2nd title) ===
- Edition of men's tournament: 6th
- Host city: Perth, Australia
- Number of participating teams: 16
- Competition format: Round-robin pools advanced teams to the round-robin quarter-final pool; round-robin quarter-final pools advanced teams to classification matches
- Champion: Yugoslavia (2nd title; 1st place in preliminary B group; 1st place in quarter-final E group)

Results
| Match | Round | Date | Opponent | Result | Goals for | Goals against | Goals diff. |
|---|---|---|---|---|---|---|---|
| Match 1/7 | Preliminary round – Group B | 5 January 1991 | Spain | Won | 8 | 3 | 5 |
| Match 2/7 | Preliminary round – Group B | 6 January 1991 | Romania | Won | 16 | 6 | 10 |
| Match 3/7 | Preliminary round – Group B | 7 January 1991 | China | Won | 25 | 9 | 16 |
| Match 4/7 | Quarter-final round – Group E | 9 January 1991 | Soviet Union | Lost | 8 | 9 | -1 |
| Match 5/7 | Quarter-final round – Group E | 10 January 1991 | Italy | Won | 9 | 6 | 3 |
| Match 6/7 | Semi-finals | 12 January 1991 | United States | Won | 7 | 6 | 1 |
| Match 7/7 | Gold medal match | 13 January 1991 | Spain | Won | 8 | 7 | 1 |
| Total | Matches played: 7 • Wins: 6 • Ties: 0 • Defeats: 1 • Win %: 85.7% | | | | 81 | 46 | 35 |

Sources:

- Official Reports (FINA) (PDF): "World Championship" (p. 15);
- Todor66: "1991 World Championship (men's tournament)".
- Head coach: (Socialist Federal Republic of Yugoslavia) Nikola Stamenić (1st title as head coach)

Roster
| # | Player | Pos | L/R | Height | Weight | Date of birth | Age of winning gold | ISHOF member |
|---|---|---|---|---|---|---|---|---|
| P1 | Mislav Bezmalinović | FP | | 1.97 m (6 ft 6 in) | 88 kg (194 lb) | 11 May 1967 | 23 years, 247 days | |
| P2 | Perica Bukić | FP | | 1.98 m (6 ft 6 in) | 85 kg (187 lb) | 20 February 1966 | 24 years, 327 days | 2008 |
| P3 | Viktor Jelenić | FP | R | 2.03 m (6 ft 8 in) | 104 kg (229 lb) | 31 October 1970 | 20 years, 74 days | |
| P4 | Igor Milanović | FP | | 1.95 m (6 ft 5 in) | 97 kg (214 lb) | 18 December 1965 | 25 years, 26 days | 2006 |
| P5 | Vitomir Padovan | FP | | | | | | |
| P6 | Dušan Popović | FP | | | | 15 June 1970 | 20 years, 212 days | |
| P7 | Renco Posinković | GK | | 1.97 m (6 ft 6 in) | 91 kg (201 lb) | 4 January 1964 | 27 years, 9 days | |
| P8 | Goran Rađenović | FP | | 1.97 m (6 ft 6 in) | 95 kg (209 lb) | 4 November 1966 | 24 years, 70 days | |
| P9 | Dubravko Šimenc | FP | R | 2.01 m (6 ft 7 in) | 115 kg (254 lb) | 2 November 1966 | 24 years, 72 days | |
| P10 | Aleksandar Šoštar | GK | | 1.96 m (6 ft 5 in) | 102 kg (225 lb) | 21 January 1964 | 26 years, 357 days | 2011 |
| P11 | Vaso Subotić | FP | | | | 29 April 1969 | 21 years, 259 days | |
| P12 | Anto Vasović | FP | | | | | | |
| P13 | Mirko Vičević | FP | | 1.92 m (6 ft 4 in) | 82 kg (181 lb) | 30 June 1968 | 22 years, 197 days | |
| Average | | | | 1.97 m (6 ft 6 in) (Note: Average height of 9 players.) | 95 kg (209 lb) (Note: Average weight of 9 players.) | 20 April 1967 | 23 years, 268 days (Note: Average age of 11 players.) | |
| Coach | Nikola Stamenić | | | | | 17 April 1949 | 41 years, 271 days | |

Sources:

- Official Reports (FINA) (PDF): "World Champions–Team Line-up" (p. 17);
- Olympedia: "Olympians Who Won a Medal at the World Aquatics Championships";
- ISHOF: "Honorees by Country".

=== 1986 (Yugoslavia, 1st title) ===
- Edition of men's tournament: 5th
- Host city: Madrid, Spain
- Number of participating teams: 15
- Competition format: Round-robin pools advanced teams to the round-robin quarter-final pool; round-robin quarter-final pools advanced teams to classification matches
- Champion: Yugoslavia (1st title; 1st place in preliminary B group; 1st place in quarter-final E group)

Results
| Match | Round | Date | Opponent | Result | Goals for | Goals against | Goals diff. |
|---|---|---|---|---|---|---|---|
| Match 1/6 | Preliminary round – Group B | 14 August 1986 | Australia | Won | 12 | 4 | 8 |
| Match 2/6 | Preliminary round – Group B | 16 August 1986 | Cuba | Drawn | 11 | 11 | 0 |
| Match 3/6 | Quarter-final round – Group E | 18 August 1986 | Spain | Won | 10 | 6 | 4 |
| Match 4/6 | Quarter-final round – Group E | 19 August 1986 | Italy | Won | 8 | 5 | 3 |
| Match 5/6 | Semi-finals | 21 August 1986 | Soviet Union | Won | 8 | 6 | 2 |
| Match 6/6 | Gold medal match | 22 August 1986 | Italy | Won | 12 | 11 | 1 |
| Total | Matches played: 6 • Wins: 5 • Ties: 1 • Defeats: 0 • Win %: 83.3% | | | | 61 | 43 | 18 |

Sources:

- Official Reports (FINA) (PDF): "World Championship" (p. 15);
- Todor66: "1986 World Championship (men's tournament)".
- Head coach: (Socialist Federal Republic of Yugoslavia) Ratko Rudić (1st title as head coach)

Roster
| Cap No. | Player | Pos | L/R | Height | Weight | Date of birth | Age of winning gold | ISHOF member |
|---|---|---|---|---|---|---|---|---|
| 1 | Milorad Krivokapić | GK | | 1.87 m (6 ft 2 in) | 85 kg (187 lb) | 8 January 1956 | 30 years, 226 days | |
| 2 | Deni Lušić | FP | | 1.90 m (6 ft 3 in) | 95 kg (209 lb) | 14 April 1962 | 24 years, 130 days | |
| 3 | Zoran Petrović | FP | | 2.03 m (6 ft 8 in) | 98 kg (216 lb) | 22 August 1960 | 26 years, 0 days | |
| 4 | Perica Bukić | FP | | 1.98 m (6 ft 6 in) | 85 kg (187 lb) | 20 February 1966 | 20 years, 183 days | 2008 |
| 5 | Veselin Đuho | FP | | 1.87 m (6 ft 2 in) | 95 kg (209 lb) | 5 January 1960 | 26 years, 229 days | |
| 6 | Dragan Andrić | FP | | 1.92 m (6 ft 4 in) | 91 kg (201 lb) | 6 June 1962 | 24 years, 77 days | |
| 7 | Mirko Vičević | FP | | 1.92 m (6 ft 4 in) | 82 kg (181 lb) | 30 June 1968 | 18 years, 53 days | |
| 8 | Dubravko Šimenc | FP | | 2.01 m (6 ft 7 in) | 115 kg (254 lb) | 2 November 1966 | 19 years, 293 days | |
| 9 | Goran Sukno | FP | | 1.88 m (6 ft 2 in) | 86 kg (190 lb) | 6 April 1959 | 27 years, 138 days | |
| 10 | Tomislav Paškvalin | FP | L | 2.04 m (6 ft 8 in) | 105 kg (231 lb) | 29 August 1961 | 24 years, 358 days | |
| 11 | Igor Milanović | FP | | 1.95 m (6 ft 5 in) | 97 kg (214 lb) | 18 December 1965 | 20 years, 247 days | 2006 |
| 12 | Anto Vasović | FP | | | | | | |
| 13 | Andrija Popović | GK | | 1.93 m (6 ft 4 in) | 86 kg (190 lb) | 22 September 1959 | 26 years, 334 days | |
| Average | | | | 1.94 m (6 ft 4 in) | 93 kg (205 lb) | 16 June 1962 | 24 years, 67 days | |
| Coach | Ratko Rudić | | | 1.88 m (6 ft 2 in) | | 7 June 1948 | 38 years, 76 days | 2007 |

Sources:

- Official Reports (FINA) (PDF): "World Champions–Team Line-up" (p. 17);
- Olympedia: "Olympians Who Won a Medal at the World Aquatics Championships";
- ISHOF: "Honorees by Country".

=== 1982 (Soviet Union, 2nd title) ===
- Edition of men's tournament: 4th
- Host city: Guayaquil, Ecuador
- Number of participating teams: 16
- Competition format: Round-robin pools advanced teams to the round-robin semi-final pool; round-robin semi-final pools advanced teams to the round-robin final pool
- Champion: Soviet Union (2nd title; 1st place in preliminary B group; 1st place in semi-final E group)

Results
| Match | Round | Date | Opponent | Result | Goals for | Goals against | Goals diff. |
|---|---|---|---|---|---|---|---|
| Match 1/7 | Preliminary round – Group B | 29 July 1982 | Australia | Won | 11 | 8 | 3 |
| Match 2/7 | Preliminary round – Group B | 30 July 1982 | United States | Won | 8 | 5 | 3 |
| Match 3/7 | Preliminary round – Group B | 31 July 1982 | Egypt | Won | 16 | 1 | 15 |
| Match 4/7 | Semi-final round – Group E | 3 August 1982 | Spain | Won | 8 | 7 | 1 |
| Match 5/7 | Semi-final round – Group E | 4 August 1982 | West Germany | Won | 11 | 8 | 3 |
| Match 6/7 | Final round – Group | 6 August 1982 | Netherlands | Won | 7 | 5 | 2 |
| Match 7/7 | Final round – Group | 7 August 1982 | Hungary | Drawn | 7 | 7 | 0 |
| Total | Matches played: 7 • Wins: 6 • Ties: 1 • Defeats: 0 • Win %: 85.7% | | | | 68 | 41 | 27 |

Sources:

- Official Reports (FINA) (PDF): "World Championship" (p. 15);
- Todor66: "1982 World Championship (men's tournament)".
- Head coach: (Soviet Union) Boris Popov (1st title as head coach)

Roster
| Cap No. | Player | Pos | Height | Weight | Date of birth | Age of winning gold | ISHOF member |
|---|---|---|---|---|---|---|---|
| P1 | Vladimir Akimov | FP | 1.84 m (6 ft 0 in) | 80 kg (176 lb) | 20 July 1953 | 29 years, 18 days | |
| P2 | Mikhail Ivanov | FP | 1.88 m (6 ft 2 in) | 98 kg (216 lb) | 18 April 1958 | 24 years, 111 days | |
| P3 | Aleksandr Kabanov | FP | 1.81 m (5 ft 11 in) | 84 kg (185 lb) | 11 June 1948 | 34 years, 57 days | 2001 |
| P4 | Alexander Kleymenov | GK | | | | | |
| P5 | Sergey Kotenko | FP | 1.76 m (5 ft 9 in) | 78 kg (172 lb) | 2 December 1956 | 25 years, 248 days | |
| P6 | Nurlan Mendygaliyev | FP | 1.92 m (6 ft 4 in) | 95 kg (209 lb) | 5 April 1961 | 21 years, 124 days | |
| P7 | Giorgi Mshvenieradze | FP | 1.88 m (6 ft 2 in) | 104 kg (229 lb) | 12 August 1960 | 21 years, 360 days | |
| P8 | Erkin Shagaev | FP | 1.78 m (5 ft 10 in) | 74 kg (163 lb) | 12 February 1959 | 23 years, 176 days | |
| P9 | Yevgeny Sharonov | GK | 1.89 m (6 ft 2 in) | 96 kg (212 lb) | 11 December 1958 | 23 years, 239 days | 2003 |
| P10 | Nikolai Smirnov | FP | 1.82 m (6 ft 0 in) | 85 kg (187 lb) | 27 February 1961 | 21 years, 161 days | |
| P11 | Aleksey Vdovin | FP | | | 17 June 1963 | 19 years, 51 days | |
| Average | | | 1.84 m (6 ft 0 in) | 88 kg (194 lb) | 6 March 1958 | 24 years, 154 days (Note: Average age of 10 players.) | |
| Coach | Boris Popov | | 1.81 m (5 ft 11 in) | | 21 March 1941 | 41 years, 139 days | 2019 |

Sources:

- Official Reports (FINA) (PDF): "World Champions–Team Line-up" (p. 17);
- Olympedia: "Olympians Who Won a Medal at the World Aquatics Championships";
- ISHOF: "Honorees by Country".

=== 1978 (Italy, 1st title) ===
- Edition of men's tournament: 3rd
- Host city: West Berlin, West Germany
- Number of participating teams: 16
- Competition format: Round-robin pools advanced teams to the round-robin semi-final pool; round-robin semi-final pools advanced teams to the round-robin final pool
- Champion: Italy (1st title; 2nd place in preliminary A group; 1st place in semi-final E group)

Results
| Match | Round | Date | Opponent | Result | Goals for | Goals against | Goals diff. |
|---|---|---|---|---|---|---|---|
| Match 1/8 | Preliminary round – Group A | 19 August 1978 | Australia | Won | 6 | 5 | 1 |
| Match 2/8 | Preliminary round – Group A | 20 August 1978 | Soviet Union | Drawn | 5 | 5 | 0 |
| Match 3/8 | Preliminary round – Group A | 21 August 1978 | Canada | Won | 4 | 2 | 2 |
| Match 4/8 | Semi-final round – Group E | 22 August 1978 | Romania | Won | 7 | 2 | 5 |
| Match 5/8 | Semi-final round – Group E | 23 August 1978 | United States | Drawn | 4 | 4 | 0 |
| Match 6/8 | Final round – Group | 25 August 1978 | Yugoslavia | Won | 6 | 5 | 1 |
| Match 7/8 | Final round – Group | 26 August 1978 | Soviet Union | Won | 5 | 4 | 1 |
| Match 8/8 | Final round – Group | 27 August 1978 | Hungary | Drawn | 4 | 4 | 0 |
| Total | Matches played: 8 • Wins: 5 • Ties: 3 • Defeats: 0 • Win %: 62.5% | | | | 41 | 31 | 10 |

Sources:

- Official Reports (FINA) (PDF): "World Championship" (p. 15);
- Todor66: "1978 World Championship (men's tournament)".

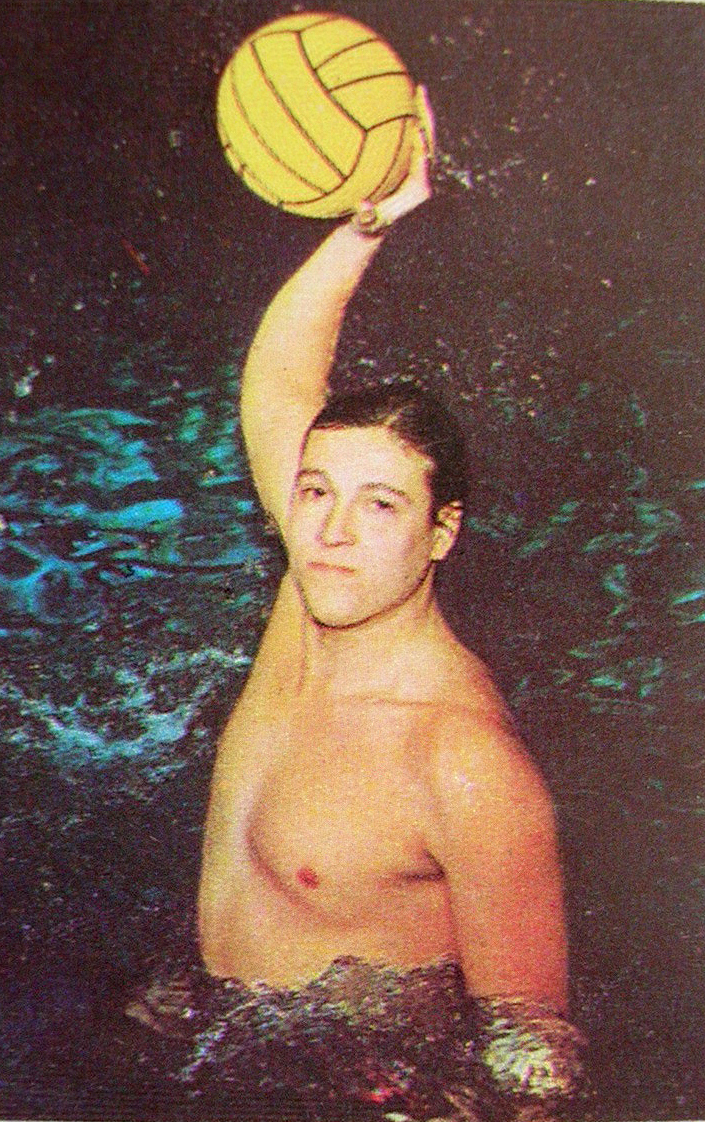
Gianni De Magistris of Italy won world title in 1978.

- Head coach: (Italy) Gianni Lonzi (1st title as head coach)

Roster
| Cap No. | Player | Pos | Height | Weight | Date of birth | Age of winning gold | ISHOF member |
|---|---|---|---|---|---|---|---|
| 1 | Alberto Alberani | GK | 1.92 m (6 ft 4 in) | 82 kg (181 lb) | 22 May 1947 | 31 years, 97 days | |
| 2 | Roldano Simeoni | FP | 1.82 m (6 ft 0 in) | 82 kg (181 lb) | 7 June 1953 | 25 years, 81 days | |
| 3 | Silvio Baracchini | FP | 1.76 m (5 ft 9 in) | 77 kg (170 lb) | 28 August 1950 | 27 years, 364 days | |
| 4 | Sante Marsili | FP | 1.81 m (5 ft 11 in) | 82 kg (181 lb) | 31 October 1950 | 27 years, 300 days | |
| 5 | Massimo Fondelli | FP | 1.83 m (6 ft 0 in) | 75 kg (165 lb) | 9 February 1954 | 24 years, 199 days | |
| 6 | Gianni De Magistris | FP | 1.85 m (6 ft 1 in) | 82 kg (181 lb) | 3 December 1950 | 27 years, 267 days | 1995 |
| 7 | Alessandro Ghibellini | FP | 1.82 m (6 ft 0 in) | 75 kg (165 lb) | 15 October 1947 | 30 years, 316 days | |
| 8 | Marco Galli | FP | 1.85 m (6 ft 1 in) | 80 kg (176 lb) | 5 March 1957 | 21 years, 175 days | |
| 9 | Paolo Ragosa | FP | 1.83 m (6 ft 0 in) | 83 kg (183 lb) | 11 September 1954 | 23 years, 350 days | |
| 10 | Romeo Collina | FP | 1.96 m (6 ft 5 in) | 94 kg (207 lb) | 7 June 1953 | 25 years, 81 days | |
| 11 | Mario Scotti-Galletta | GK | | | | | |
| Average | | | 1.85 m (6 ft 1 in) (Note: Average height of 10 players.) | 81 kg (179 lb) (Note: Average weight of 10 players.) | 16 January 1952 | 26 years, 223 days | |
| Coach | Gianni Lonzi | | 1.82 m (6 ft 0 in) | | 4 August 1938 | 40 years, 23 days | 2009 |

Sources:

- Official Reports (FINA) (PDF): "World Champions–Team Line-up" (p. 17);
- Olympedia: "Olympians Who Won a Medal at the World Aquatics Championships";
- ISHOF: "Honorees by Country".

=== 1975 (Soviet Union, 1st title) ===
- Edition of men's tournament: 2nd
- Host city: Cali, Colombia
- Number of participating teams: 16
- Competition format: Round-robin pools advanced teams to the round-robin semi-final pool; round-robin semi-final pools advanced teams to the round-robin final pool
- Champion: Soviet Union (1st title; 1st place in preliminary C group; 1st place in semi-final F group)

Results
| Match | Round | Date | Opponent | Result | Goals for | Goals against | Goals diff. |
|---|---|---|---|---|---|---|---|
| Match 1/8 | Preliminary round – Group C | 19 July 1975 | United States | Drawn | 4 | 4 | 0 |
| Match 2/8 | Preliminary round – Group C | 20 July 1975 | Iran | Won | 13 | 2 | 11 |
| Match 3/8 | Preliminary round – Group C | 21 July 1975 | Spain | Won | 7 | 4 | 3 |
| Match 4/8 | Semi-final round – Group F | 22 July 1975 | Italy | Won | 3 | 2 | 1 |
| Match 5/8 | Semi-final round – Group F | 23 July 1975 | Netherlands | Won | 4 | 2 | 2 |
| Match 6/8 | Final round – Group | 25 July 1975 | Cuba | Won | 8 | 3 | 5 |
| Match 7/8 | Final round – Group | 26 July 1975 | Italy | Drawn | 5 | 5 | 0 |
| Match 8/8 | Final round – Group | 27 July 1975 | Hungary | Won | 5 | 4 | 1 |
| Total | Matches played: 8 • Wins: 6 • Ties: 2 • Defeats: 0 • Win %: 75.0% | | | | 49 | 26 | 23 |

Sources:

- Official Reports (FINA) (PDF): "World Championship" (p. 15);
- Todor66: "1975 World Championship (men's tournament)".
- Head coach: (Soviet Union) Anatoly Blumental

Roster
| Cap No. | Player | Pos | Height | Weight | Date of birth | Age of winning gold | ISHOF member |
|---|---|---|---|---|---|---|---|
| P1 | Aleksei Barkalov | FP | 1.80 m (5 ft 11 in) | 82 kg (181 lb) | 18 February 1946 | 29 years, 159 days | 1993 |
| P2 | Aleksandr Dolgushin | FP | 1.87 m (6 ft 2 in) | 99 kg (218 lb) | 7 March 1946 | 29 years, 142 days | 2010 |
| P3 | Aleksandr Dreval | FP | 1.90 m (6 ft 3 in) | 89 kg (196 lb) | 17 July 1944 | 31 years, 10 days | |
| P4 | Sergey Gorshkhov | FP | | | | | |
| P5 | Aleksandr Kabanov | FP | 1.81 m (5 ft 11 in) | 84 kg (185 lb) | 11 June 1948 | 27 years, 46 days | 2001 |
| P6 | Anatoly Klebanov | GK | 1.83 m (6 ft 0 in) | 83 kg (183 lb) | 8 October 1952 | 22 years, 292 days | |
| P7 | Nikolay Melnikov | FP | 1.84 m (6 ft 0 in) | 86 kg (190 lb) | 24 January 1948 | 27 years, 184 days | |
| P8 | Aleksandr Rodionov | FP | | | | | |
| P9 | Vitaly Romanchuk | FP | 1.91 m (6 ft 3 in) | 90 kg (198 lb) | 14 March 1950 | 25 years, 135 days | |
| P10 | Vitaly Rozkov | FP | | | | | |
| P11 | Aleksandr Zakharov | GK | 1.88 m (6 ft 2 in) | 87 kg (192 lb) | 3 April 1954 | 21 years, 115 days | |
| Average | | | 1.86 m (6 ft 1 in) (Note: Average height of 8 players.) | 88 kg (194 lb) (Note: Average weight of 8 players.) | 27 October 1948 | 26 years, 273 days (Note: Average age of 8 players.) | |

Sources:

- Official Reports (FINA) (PDF): "World Champions–Team Line-up" (p. 17);
- Olympedia: "Olympians Who Won a Medal at the World Aquatics Championships";
- ISHOF: "Honorees by Country".

=== 1973 (Hungary, 1st title) ===
- Edition of men's tournament: 1st
- Host city: (Socialist Federal Republic of Yugoslavia) Belgrade, Yugoslavia
- Number of participating teams: 16
- Competition format: Round-robin pools advanced teams to the round-robin final pool
- Champion: Hungary (1st title; 1st place in preliminary B group)

Results
| Match | Round | Date | Opponent | Result | Goals for | Goals against | Goals diff. |
|---|---|---|---|---|---|---|---|
| Match 1/8 | Preliminary round – Group B | 2 September 1973 | Spain | Won | 7 | 3 | 4 |
| Match 2/8 | Preliminary round – Group B | 3 September 1973 | Israel | Won | 15 | 0 | 15 |
| Match 3/8 | Preliminary round – Group B | 4 September 1973 | Italy | Won | 6 | 4 | 2 |
| Match 4/8 | Preliminary round – Group B | 5 September 1973 | Romania | Won | 8 | 4 | 4 |
| Match 5/8 | Final round – Group | 6 September 1973 | United States | Won | 6 | 2 | 4 |
| Match 6/8 | Final round – Group | 7 September 1973 | Hungary | Won | 5 | 4 | 1 |
| Match 7/8 | Final round – Group | 8 September 1973 | Yugoslavia | Drawn | 3 | 3 | 0 |
| Match 8/8 | Final round – Group | 9 September 1973 | Cuba | Won | 8 | 4 | 4 |
| Total | Matches played: 8 • Wins: 7 • Ties: 1 • Defeats: 0 • Win %: 87.5% | | | | 58 | 24 | 34 |

Sources:

- Official Reports (FINA) (PDF): "World Championship" (p. 15);
- Todor66: "1973 World Championship (men's tournament)".
- Head coach: (Hungary) Dezső Gyarmati (1st title as head coach)

Roster
| Cap No. | Player | Pos | Height | Weight | Date of birth | Age of winning gold | ISHOF member |
|---|---|---|---|---|---|---|---|
| P1 | Balazs Balla | FP | | | | | |
| P2 | András Bodnár | FP | 1.80 m (5 ft 11 in) | 78 kg (172 lb) | 9 April 1942 | 31 years, 153 days | 2017 |
| P3 | Gábor Csapó | FP | 1.98 m (6 ft 6 in) | 103 kg (227 lb) | 20 September 1950 | 22 years, 354 days | |
| P4 | Tibor Cservenyák | GK | 1.85 m (6 ft 1 in) | 91 kg (201 lb) | 8 August 1948 | 25 years, 32 days | |
| P5 | Tamás Faragó | FP | 1.94 m (6 ft 4 in) | 95 kg (209 lb) | 5 August 1952 | 21 years, 35 days | 1993 |
| P6 | István Görgényi | FP | 1.87 m (6 ft 2 in) | 84 kg (185 lb) | 2 November 1946 | 26 years, 311 days | |
| P7 | Zoltán Kásás | FP | 1.90 m (6 ft 3 in) | 87 kg (192 lb) | 15 September 1946 | 26 years, 359 days | |
| P8 | Ferenc Konrád | FP | 1.83 m (6 ft 0 in) | 88 kg (194 lb) | 17 April 1945 | 28 years, 145 days | |
| P9 | Endre Molnár | GK | 1.85 m (6 ft 1 in) | 92 kg (203 lb) | 23 July 1945 | 28 years, 48 days | |
| P10 | László Sárosi | FP | 1.83 m (6 ft 0 in) | 83 kg (183 lb) | 12 October 1946 | 26 years, 332 days | |
| P11 | István Szívós Jr. | FP | 2.02 m (6 ft 8 in) | 106 kg (234 lb) | 24 April 1948 | 25 years, 138 days | 1996 |
| Average | | | 1.89 m (6 ft 2 in) | 91 kg (201 lb) | 15 May 1947 | 26 years, 117 days | |
| Coach | Dezső Gyarmati | | 1.86 m (6 ft 1 in) | | 23 October 1927 | 45 years, 321 days | 1976 |

Sources:

- Official Reports (FINA) (PDF): "World Champions–Team Line-up" (p. 17);
- Olympedia: "Olympians Who Won a Medal at the World Aquatics Championships";
- ISHOF: "Honorees by Country".

== See also ==
- Water polo at the World Aquatics Championships
- List of world champions in women's water polo
- List of World Aquatics Championships men's water polo tournament records and statistics
- List of World Aquatics Championships women's water polo tournament records and statistics
- List of World Aquatics Championships medalists in water polo
- List of Olympic champions in men's water polo
- List of Olympic champions in women's water polo

== Sources ==
=== Official Reports (FINA) ===
PDF documents on the FINA website:

- HistoFINA – Water polo medalists and statistics (as of September 2019) (archive) (pp. 14–18)

=== Official Results Books (FINA) ===
PDF documents on the Omega Timing website:

- 12th World Championship (2007)
  - General information, Men's Round Summary.

PDF documents on the Sport Result website:

- 13th World Championship (2009)
  - Results, Participants, Statistics.
  - Men's Competition Schedule, Men's Round Summary.
- 14th World Championship (2011)
  - Results, Participants, Statistics.
  - Men's Competition Schedule, Men's Round Summary.
- 15th World Championship (2013)
  - Results, Participants, Statistics.
  - Men's Competition Schedule, Men's Round Summary.
- 16th World Championship (2015)
  - Results, Participants, Statistics.
  - Men's Competition Schedule, Men's Round Summary.
- 17th World Championship (2017)
  - Results, Participants, Statistics.
  - Men's Competition Schedule, Men's Round Summary.
- 18th World Championship (2019)
  - Results, Participants, Statistics.
  - Men's Competition Schedule, Men's Round Summary.
- 19th World Championship (2022)
  - Results, Participants, Statistics.
  - Men's Competition Schedule, Men's Round Summary.
- 20th World Championship (2023)
  - Results, Participants, Statistics.
  - Men's Competition Schedule, Men's Round Summary.
- 21st World Championship (2024)
  - Results, Participants, Statistics.
  - Men's Competition Schedule, Men's Round Summary.

=== Olympedia ===
Water polo on the Olympedia website:

- Olympians Who Won a Medal at the World Aquatics Championships

=== Todor66 ===
Water polo on the Todor66 website:

- Water Polo World Championship
- Men's Water Polo World Championship
- 1973 World Championship (men's tournament)
- 1975 World Championship (men's tournament)
- 1978 World Championship (men's tournament)
- 1982 World Championship (men's tournament)
- 1986 World Championship (men's tournament)
- 1991 World Championship (men's tournament)
- 1994 World Championship (men's tournament)
- 1998 World Championship (men's tournament)
- 2001 World Championship (men's tournament)
- 2003 World Championship (men's tournament)
- 2005 World Championship (men's tournament)
- 2007 World Championship (men's tournament)
- 2009 World Championship (men's tournament)
- 2011 World Championship (men's tournament)
- 2013 World Championship (men's tournament)
- 2015 World Championship (men's tournament)
- 2017 World Championship (men's tournament)
- 2019 World Championship (men's tournament)
- 2022 World Championship (men's tournament)
- 2023 World Championship (men's tournament)
- 2024 World Championship (men's tournament)
- 2025 World Championship (men's tournament)

=== ISHOF ===
International Swimming Hall of Fame (ISHOF) website:

- Honorees Listed by Category – Water Polo
- Honorees Listed by Category – Coaches
- Honorees Listed by Category – Contributors
- Honorees by Country
- Honorees By Last Name
