= Water polo at the Friendship Games =

Water polo at the Friendship Games was contested at the Ciudad Deportiva in Havana, Cuba between 19 and 26 August 1984.

== Medal summary ==
Six teams competed in a round-robin tournament.

The host nation, Cuba, had two teams in the tournament. However, the Cuba "B" team competed "off competition". Despite ending the tournament on the fifth place, this result was not included in the final rankings. The sixth team (i. e. Bulgaria) was instead counted as the fifth place team.

| | Team | Pld | W | D | L | GF | GA | GD | Points |
|---|---|---|---|---|---|---|---|---|---|
| Gold medal | Soviet Union | 5 | 5 | 0 | 0 | 66 | 38 | +28 | 10 |
| Silver medal | Hungary | 5 | 3 | 1 | 1 | 68 | 43 | +25 | 7 |
| Bronze medal | Cuba A | 5 | 3 | 1 | 1 | 60 | 47 | +13 | 7 |
| 4 | Czechoslovakia | 5 | 1 | 0 | 4 | 46 | 62 | -16 | 2 |
| – | Cuba B | 5 | 1 | 0 | 4 | 44 | 68 | -24 | 2 |
| 5 | Bulgaria | 5 | 1 | 0 | 4 | 42 | 68 | -26 | 2 |

=== Results ===
| Results | (Soviet Union) | (Hungary) | (Cuba) A | (Czechoslovakia) | (Cuba) B | (Bulgaria) |
|---|---|---|---|---|---|---|
| Soviet Union | | 9:7 | 8:7 | 13:7 | 18:9 | 18:8 |
| Hungary | 7:9 | | 12:12 | 13:9 | 19:7 | 17:6 |
| Cuba A | 7:8 | 12:12 | | 16:10 | 12:11 | 13:6 |
| Czechoslovakia | 7:13 | 9:13 | 10:16 | | 8:9 | 12:11 |
| Cuba B | 9:18 | 7:19 | 11:12 | 9:8 | | 8:11 |
| Bulgaria | 8:18 | 6:17 | 6:13 | 11:12 | 11:8 | |

== Winning teams' squads ==
| Event | Gold | Silver | Bronze |
|---|---|---|---|
| Men's | Soviet Union Mikhail Giorgadze; Yevgeny Grishin; Mikhail Ivanov; Aleksandr Kabanov; Sergey Kotenko; Sergey Markoch; Nurlan Mendygaliyev; Georgi Mshvenieradze; Sergey Naumov; Pavel Prokopchuk; Nikolai Smirnov; Erkin Shagaev; Yevgeny Sharonov | Hungary Imre Budavári; Gábor Csapó; Tamás Faragó; György Gerendás; György Horkai; György Kenéz; Tibor Keszthelyi; István Kiss; László Kuncz; Gábor Nemes; Gábor Schmiedt; József Somossy; Attila Sudár | Cuba A Carlos Benitez; Lazaro Costa; Pablo Cuesta; Jorge Del Valle; Jesús Dereuville; Bárbaro Díaz; Nelson Domínguez; Oriel Domínguez; Miguel Nunez; Oscar Periche; Arturo Ramos; Jorge Rizo; Gerardo Rodríguez |

== Medal table ==
* Host nation (Cuba)

| Rank | Nation | Gold | Silver | Bronze | Total |
|---|---|---|---|---|---|
| 1 | Soviet Union (URS) | 1 | 0 | 0 | 1 |
| 2 | Hungary (HUN) | 0 | 1 | 0 | 1 |
| 3 | Cuba (CUB)* | 0 | 0 | 1 | 1 |
| Totals (3 entries) | | 1 | 1 | 1 | 3 |

== See also ==
- Water polo at the 1984 Summer Olympics
