= Water polo at the 1980 Summer Olympics =

Water polo at the Games of the XXII Olympiad
- Venues: Swimming Pool of the Olimpiysky Sports Complex Outdoor Swimming Pool of the Central Lenin Stadium
- Date: 20–29 July 1980
- Competitors: 132 from 12 nations

Medalists
| 1st place, gold medalist(s) | | Soviet Union |
| 2nd place, silver medalist(s) | | Yugoslavia |
| 3rd place, bronze medalist(s) | | Hungary |

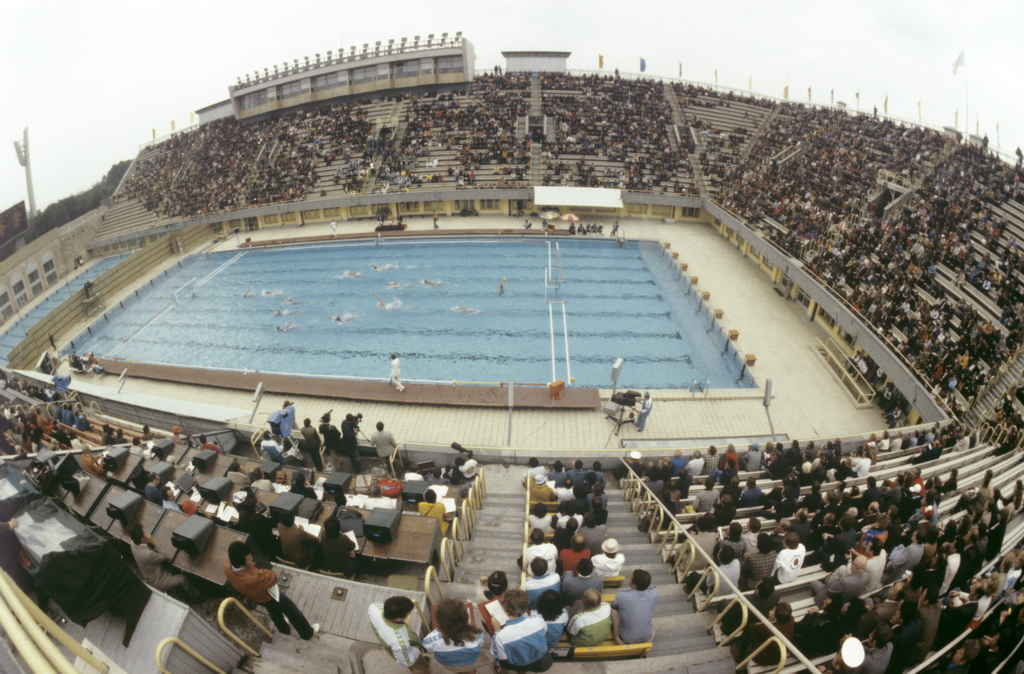
Outdoor Swimming Pool of the Central Lenin Stadium during the event. RIAN photo

Water polo at the 1980 Summer Olympics as usual was a part of the swimming sport, other two parts were swimming and diving. They were not three separate sports, because they all were governed by one federation — FINA. Water Polo discipline consisted of one event: men's team. In the preliminary round 12 teams were divided into three groups. Two best teams from each group (shaded ones) advanced to Group A of the final round to determine places 1 through 6. The rest of teams played in Group B of the final round to determine places 7 through 12.

The event was held between 20 and 29 July in two venues:

- the Swimming Pool of the Olimpiysky Sports Complex (central part of Moscow)
- the Outdoor Swimming Pool of the Central Lenin Stadium at Luzhniki (south-western part of Moscow)

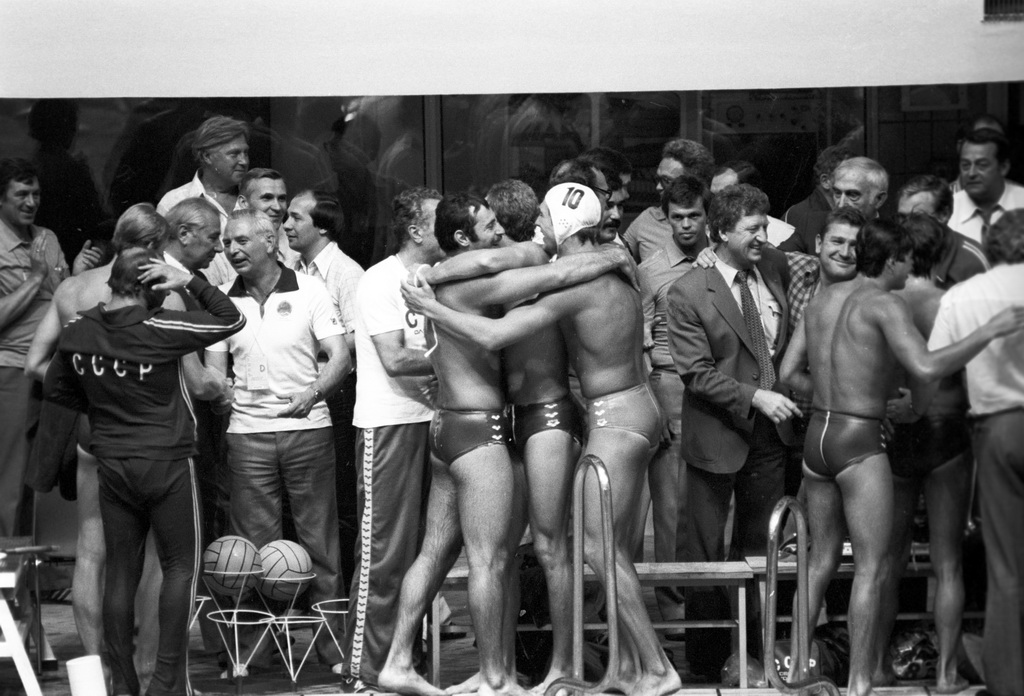
The USSR Team, congratulated by their fans after victory in the final. RIAN photo

== Medals ==
| Event | Gold | Silver | Bronze |
|---|---|---|---|
| Men's | Soviet Union Vladimir Akimov; Aleksey Barkalov; Yevgeny Grishin; Mikhail Ivanov; Aleksandr Kabanov; Sergey Kotenko; Georgi Mshvenieradze; Mait Riisman; Viacheslav Sobchenko; Yevgeny Sharonov; Erkin Shagaev | Yugoslavia Luka Vezlić; Zoran Gopčević; Damir Polić; Ratko Rudić; Zoran Mustur; Zoran Roje; Milivoj Bebić; Slobodan Trifunović; Boško Lozica; Predrag Manojlović; Milorad Krivokapić | Hungary Endre Molnár; István Szívós, Jr. Attila Sudár; György Gerendás; György Horkai; Gábor Csapó; István Udvardi; László Kuncz; Tamás Faragó; Károly Hauszler; István Kiss |

== Qualification ==
| Qualification | Date | Host | Berths | Qualified |
|---|---|---|---|---|
| Host nation | 23 October 1974 | (Austria) Vienna | 1 | Soviet Union |
| 1978 World Championships | 19–27 August 1978 | (West Germany) West Berlin | ~~6~~ 4 | Italy; Hungary; Yugoslavia; ~~United States~~; Romania; ~~West Germany~~ |
| Intercontinental qualification | 28 April – 4 May 1980 | (Bulgaria) Sofia | 5 | Spain; Australia; Cuba; Netherlands; Greece |
| Wildcards | | | 2 | Bulgaria; Sweden |
| Total | | | 12 | |

== Results ==
=== Preliminary round ===
==== Group A ====
| Pos | Team | Pld | W | D | L | GF | GA | GD | Pts | Qualification |
|---|---|---|---|---|---|---|---|---|---|---|
| 1 | Hungary | 3 | 2 | 1 | 0 | 19 | 14 | +5 | 5 | Medal round |
| 2 | (International Olympic Committee) Netherlands | 3 | 2 | 0 | 1 | 16 | 15 | +1 | 4 | Medal round |
| 3 | Romania | 3 | 1 | 1 | 1 | 15 | 15 | 0 | 3 | Classification round |
| 4 | Greece | 3 | 0 | 0 | 3 | 16 | 22 | −6 | 0 | Classification round |

| 20 July 1980 | Hungary | 6–6 | Romania | Luzhniki |
| 20 July 1980 | Score by quarters: 2–2, 1–0, 1–3, 2–1 | | | Luzhniki |
| 20 July 1980 | Faragó 2 | Goals | Nastasiu 3 | Luzhniki |

| 20 July 1980 | Greece | 7–8 | (International Olympic Committee) Netherlands | Luzhniki |
| 20 July 1980 | Score by quarters: 1–1, 3–1, 2–2, 1–4 | | | Luzhniki |
| 20 July 1980 | three players 2 | Goals | Van Zeeland 3 | Luzhniki |

| 21 July 1980 | Hungary | 5–3 | (International Olympic Committee) Netherlands | Luzhniki |
| 21 July 1980 | Score by quarters: 2–1, 2–0, 1–1, 0–1 | | | Luzhniki |
| 21 July 1980 | Faragó 2 | Goals | three players 1 | Luzhniki |

| 21 July 1980 | Greece | 4–6 | Romania | Luzhniki |
| 21 July 1980 | Score by quarters: 1–0, 0–2, 2–3, 1–1 | | | Luzhniki |
| 21 July 1980 | Capralos 2 | Goals | six players 1 | Luzhniki |

| 22 July 1980 | Hungary | 8–5 | Greece | Luzhniki |
| 22 July 1980 | Score by quarters: 1–0, 2–3, 3–0, 2–2 | | | Luzhniki |
| 22 July 1980 | three players 2 | Goals | Stathakis 4 | Luzhniki |

| 22 July 1980 | Romania | 3–5 | (International Olympic Committee) Netherlands | Luzhniki |
| 22 July 1980 | Score by quarters: 1–2, 2–1, 0–1, 0–1 | | | Luzhniki |
| 22 July 1980 | Rus 2 | Goals | Landeweerd 3 | Luzhniki |

==== Group B ====
| Pos | Team | Pld | W | D | L | GF | GA | GD | Pts | Qualification |
|---|---|---|---|---|---|---|---|---|---|---|
| 1 | Soviet Union (H) | 3 | 3 | 0 | 0 | 24 | 10 | +14 | 6 | Medal round |
| 2 | (International Olympic Committee) Spain | 3 | 2 | 0 | 1 | 15 | 11 | +4 | 4 | Medal round |
| 3 | (International Olympic Committee) Italy | 3 | 0 | 1 | 2 | 14 | 17 | −3 | 1 | Classification round |
| 4 | Sweden | 3 | 0 | 1 | 2 | 8 | 23 | −15 | 1 | Classification round |

(H) Hosts

| 20 July 1980 | Sweden | 3–7 | (International Olympic Committee) Spain | Luzhniki |
| 20 July 1980 | Score by quarters: 0–2, 1–1, 0–0, 2–4 | | | Luzhniki |
| 20 July 1980 | Stenberg 2 | Goals | Estiarte 4 | Luzhniki |

| 20 July 1980 | Soviet Union | 8–6 | (International Olympic Committee) Italy | Luzhniki |
| 20 July 1980 | Score by quarters: 4–3, 1–1, 1–2, 2–0 | | | Luzhniki |
| 20 July 1980 | Ivanov, Kotenko 2 | Goals | De Magistris 4 | Luzhniki |

| 21 July 1980 | Sweden | 4–4 | (International Olympic Committee) Italy | Luzhniki |
| 21 July 1980 | Score by quarters: 2–1, 2–1, 0–1, 0–1 | | | Luzhniki |
| 21 July 1980 | Andersson 3 | Goals | D'Angelo 2 | Luzhniki |

| 21 July 1980 | Soviet Union | 4–3 | (International Olympic Committee) Spain | Luzhniki |
| 21 July 1980 | Score by quarters: 0–1, 2–0, 0–1, 2–1 | | | Luzhniki |
| 21 July 1980 | Grishin 2 | Goals | three players 1 | Luzhniki |

| 22 July 1980 | Sweden | 1–12 | Soviet Union | Luzhniki |
| 22 July 1980 | Score by quarters: 0–3, 1–2, 0–4, 0–3 | | | Luzhniki |
| 22 July 1980 | Carlström 1 | Goals | Riisman 3 | Luzhniki |

| 22 July 1980 | Spain (International Olympic Committee) | 5–4 | (International Olympic Committee) Italy | Luzhniki |
| 22 July 1980 | Score by quarters: 1–1, 2–0, 0–1, 2–2 | | | Luzhniki |
| 22 July 1980 | Estiarte 2 | Goals | Collina, Simeoni 2 | Luzhniki |

==== Group C ====
| Pos | Team | Pld | W | D | L | GF | GA | GD | Pts | Qualification |
|---|---|---|---|---|---|---|---|---|---|---|
| 1 | Yugoslavia | 3 | 2 | 1 | 0 | 24 | 10 | +14 | 5 | Medal round |
| 2 | Cuba | 3 | 2 | 1 | 0 | 19 | 11 | +8 | 5 | Medal round |
| 3 | (International Olympic Committee) Australia | 3 | 1 | 0 | 2 | 15 | 20 | −5 | 2 | Classification round |
| 4 | Bulgaria | 3 | 0 | 0 | 3 | 8 | 25 | −17 | 0 | Classification round |

| 20 July 1980 | Yugoslavia | 6–6 | Cuba | Luzhniki |
| 20 July 1980 | Score by quarters: 2–4, 1–1, 1–0, 2–1 | | | Luzhniki |
| 20 July 1980 | Rudić 2 | Goals | Díaz 3 | Luzhniki |

| 20 July 1980 | Australia (International Olympic Committee) | 9–5 | Bulgaria | Luzhniki |
| 20 July 1980 | Score by quarters: 1–0, 3–0, 2–3, 3–2 | | | Luzhniki |
| 20 July 1980 | C. Turner 6 | Goals | five players 1 | Luzhniki |

| 21 July 1980 | Yugoslavia | 9–2 | Bulgaria | Luzhniki |
| 21 July 1980 | Score by quarters: 1–1, 2–0, 2–1, 4–0 | | | Luzhniki |
| 21 July 1980 | Gopčević 3 | Goals | Nanov, Popov 1 | Luzhniki |

| 21 July 1980 | Australia (International Olympic Committee) | 4–6 | Cuba | Luzhniki |
| 21 July 1980 | Score by quarters: 1–2, 2–1, 1–1, 0–2 | | | Luzhniki |
| 21 July 1980 | Bryant, C. Turner 2 | Goals | Rizo 4 | Luzhniki |

| 22 July 1980 | Yugoslavia | 9–2 | (International Olympic Committee) Australia | Luzhniki |
| 22 July 1980 | Score by quarters: 0–0, 3–0, 2–1, 4–1 | | | Luzhniki |
| 22 July 1980 | Rudić 3 | Goals | Bryant, Neesham 1 | Luzhniki |

| 22 July 1980 | Cuba | 7–1 | Bulgaria | Luzhniki |
| 22 July 1980 | Score by quarters: 0–0, 2–0, 2–1, 3–0 | | | Luzhniki |
| 22 July 1980 | Benítez 2 | Goals | Nanov 1 | Luzhniki |

=== Final round ===
==== Group A ====
| Pos | Team | Pld | W | D | L | GF | GA | GD | Pts |
|---|---|---|---|---|---|---|---|---|---|
| 1st place, gold medalist(s) | Soviet Union (H) | 5 | 5 | 0 | 0 | 34 | 21 | +13 | 10 |
| 2nd place, silver medalist(s) | Yugoslavia | 5 | 3 | 1 | 1 | 34 | 32 | +2 | 7 |
| 3rd place, bronze medalist(s) | Hungary | 5 | 3 | 0 | 2 | 32 | 30 | +2 | 6 |
| 4 | (International Olympic Committee) Spain | 5 | 2 | 0 | 3 | 28 | 31 | −3 | 4 |
| 5 | Cuba | 5 | 0 | 2 | 3 | 31 | 38 | −7 | 2 |
| 6 | (International Olympic Committee) Netherlands | 5 | 0 | 1 | 4 | 26 | 33 | −7 | 1 |

(H) Hosts

| 24 July 1980 | Hungary | 4–5 | Soviet Union | Luzhniki |
| 24 July 1980 | Score by quarters: 2–2, 1–1, 1–2, 0–0 | | | Luzhniki |
| 24 July 1980 | Gerendás 3 | Goals | Shagaev 2 | Luzhniki |

| 24 July 1980 | Netherlands (International Olympic Committee) | 5–6 | (International Olympic Committee) Spain | Luzhniki |
| 24 July 1980 | Score by quarters: 1–1, 3–1, 2–2, 1–4 | | | Luzhniki |
| 24 July 1980 | Landeweerd, Veer 2 | Goals | Estiarte 3 | Luzhniki |

| 24 July 1980 | Yugoslavia | 7–7 | Cuba | Luzhniki |
| 24 July 1980 | Score by quarters: 1–1, 4–3, 1–1, 1–2 | | | Luzhniki |
| 24 July 1980 | Gopčević 4 | Goals | Rizo 4 | Luzhniki |

| 25 July 1980 | Hungary | 7–8 | Yugoslavia | Luzhniki |
| 25 July 1980 | Score by quarters: 2–3, 2–2, 0–1, 3–2 | | | Luzhniki |
| 25 July 1980 | Horkai 3 | Goals | three players 2 | Luzhniki |

| 25 July 1980 | Netherlands (International Olympic Committee) | 7–7 | Cuba | Luzhniki |
| 25 July 1980 | Score by quarters: 3–1, 2–2, 0–2, 2–2 | | | Luzhniki |
| 25 July 1980 | Van Zeeland 3 | Goals | Rizo 4 | Luzhniki |

| 25 July 1980 | Soviet Union | 6–2 | (International Olympic Committee) Spain | Luzhniki |
| 25 July 1980 | Score by quarters: 1–0, 1–1, 3–1, 1–0 | | | Luzhniki |
| 25 July 1980 | six players 1 | Goals | Carmona 2 | Luzhniki |

| 26 July 1980 | Hungary | 6–5 | (International Olympic Committee) Spain | Luzhniki |
| 26 July 1980 | Score by quarters: 1–1, 2–0, 2–3, 1–1 | | | Luzhniki |
| 26 July 1980 | Faragó, Gerendás 2 | Goals | Estiarte 3 | Luzhniki |

| 26 July 1980 | Netherlands (International Olympic Committee) | 4–5 | Yugoslavia | Luzhniki |
| 26 July 1980 | Score by quarters: 0–1, 1–1, 0–2, 3–1 | | | Luzhniki |
| 26 July 1980 | Noordegraaf, Veer 2 | Goals | Gopčević 2 | Luzhniki |

| 26 July 1980 | Soviet Union | 8–5 | Cuba | Luzhniki |
| 26 July 1980 | Score by quarters: 1–1, 1–1, 3–1, 3–2 | | | Luzhniki |
| 26 July 1980 | three players 2 | Goals | five players 1 | Luzhniki |

| 28 July 1980 | Hungary | 7–5 | Cuba | Olimpiysky |
| 28 July 1980 | Score by quarters: 1–1, 1–3, 2–0, 3–1 | | | Olimpiysky |
| 28 July 1980 | Horkai 3 | Goals | five players 1 | Olimpiysky |

| 28 July 1980 | Netherlands (International Olympic Committee) | 3–7 | Soviet Union | Olimpiysky |
| 28 July 1980 | Score by quarters: 0–1, 1–1, 1–3, 1–2 | | | Olimpiysky |
| 28 July 1980 | three players 1 | Goals | Ivanov 3 | Olimpiysky |

| 28 July 1980 | Spain (International Olympic Committee) | 6–7 | Yugoslavia | Olimpiysky |
| 28 July 1980 | Score by quarters: 1–2, 1–1, 2–4, 2–0 | | | Olimpiysky |
| 28 July 1980 | Estiarte 3 | Goals | Bebić, Gopčević 2 | Olimpiysky |

| 29 July 1980 | Hungary | 8–7 | (International Olympic Committee) Netherlands | Olimpiysky |
| 29 July 1980 | Score by quarters: 2–2, 2–1, 2–3, 2–1 | | | Olimpiysky |
| 29 July 1980 | Faragó, Kuncz 2 | Goals | Veer 3 | Olimpiysky |

| 29 July 1980 | Soviet Union | 8–7 | Yugoslavia | Olimpiysky |
| 29 July 1980 | Score by quarters: 3–2, 2–2, 1–0, 2–3 | | | Olimpiysky |
| 29 July 1980 | Kotenko 3 | Goals | Rudić 3 | Olimpiysky |

| 29 July 1980 | Spain (International Olympic Committee) | 9–7 | Cuba | Olimpiysky |
| 29 July 1980 | Score by quarters: 2–2, 4–1, 1–2, 2–2 | | | Olimpiysky |
| 29 July 1980 | Estiarte 5 | Goals | Rizo 4 | Olimpiysky |

==== Group B ====
| Pos | Team | Pld | W | D | L | GF | GA | GD | Pts |
|---|---|---|---|---|---|---|---|---|---|
| 7 | (International Olympic Committee) Australia | 5 | 4 | 1 | 0 | 30 | 19 | +11 | 9 |
| 8 | (International Olympic Committee) Italy | 5 | 4 | 0 | 1 | 26 | 18 | +8 | 8 |
| 9 | Romania | 5 | 3 | 1 | 1 | 36 | 26 | +10 | 7 |
| 10 | Greece | 5 | 2 | 0 | 3 | 28 | 28 | 0 | 4 |
| 11 | Sweden | 5 | 1 | 0 | 4 | 23 | 40 | −17 | 2 |
| 12 | Bulgaria | 5 | 0 | 0 | 5 | 25 | 37 | −12 | 0 |

| 24 July 1980 | Romania | 3–5 | (International Olympic Committee) Italy | Luzhniki |
| 24 July 1980 | Score by quarters: 1–1, 1–1, 1–1, 0–2 | | | Luzhniki |

| 24 July 1980 | Greece | 9–5 | Sweden | Luzhniki |
| 24 July 1980 | Score by quarters: 1–3, 4–0, 3–2, 1–0 | | | Luzhniki |

| 24 July 1980 | Australia (International Olympic Committee) | 8–5 | Bulgaria | Luzhniki |
| 24 July 1980 | Score by quarters: 3–1, 2–2, 1–1, 2–1 | | | Luzhniki |

| 25 July 1980 | Romania | 4–4 | (International Olympic Committee) Australia | Luzhniki |
| 25 July 1980 | Score by quarters: 0–0, 0–1, 2–1, 2–2 | | | Luzhniki |

| 25 July 1980 | Greece | 6–4 | Bulgaria | Luzhniki |
| 25 July 1980 | Score by quarters: 0–1, 2–1, 2–1, 2–1 | | | Luzhniki |

| 25 July 1980 | Italy (International Olympic Committee) | 8–3 | Sweden | Luzhniki |
| 25 July 1980 | Score by quarters: 3–1, 3–1, 0–0, 2–1 | | | Luzhniki |

| 26 July 1980 | Romania | 8–3 | Sweden | Luzhniki |
| 26 July 1980 | Score by quarters: 1–1, 2–1, 1–1, 4–0 | | | Luzhniki |

| 26 July 1980 | Greece | 2–4 | (International Olympic Committee) Australia | Luzhniki |
| 26 July 1980 | Score by quarters: 1–1, 0–1, 1–1, 0–1 | | | Luzhniki |

| 26 July 1980 | Italy (International Olympic Committee) | 5–4 | Bulgaria | Luzhniki |
| 26 July 1980 | Score by quarters: 0–2, 2–0, 1–0, 2–2 | | | Luzhniki |

| 28 July 1980 | Romania | 10–6 | Bulgaria | Olimpiysky |
| 28 July 1980 | Score by quarters: 0–0, 5–2, 2–1, 3–3 | | | Olimpiysky |

| 28 July 1980 | Greece | 3–4 | (International Olympic Committee) Italy | Olimpiysky |
| 28 July 1980 | Score by quarters: 1–1, 0–2, 2–0, 0–1 | | | Olimpiysky |

| 28 July 1980 | Sweden | 4–9 | (International Olympic Committee) Australia | Olimpiysky |
| 28 July 1980 | Score by quarters: 1–2, 2–2, 0–2, 1–3 | | | Olimpiysky |

| 29 July 1980 | Romania | 11–8 | Greece | Olimpiysky |
| 29 July 1980 | Score by quarters: 3–2, 3–2, 2–2, 3–2 | | | Olimpiysky |

| 29 July 1980 | Italy (International Olympic Committee) | 4–5 | (International Olympic Committee) Australia | Olimpiysky |
| 29 July 1980 | Score by quarters: 1–1, 1–2, 1–1, 1–1 | | | Olimpiysky |

| 29 July 1980 | Sweden | 8–6 | Bulgaria | Olimpiysky |
| 29 July 1980 | Score by quarters: 0–2, 3–1, 1–0, 4–3 | | | Olimpiysky |

== Final ranking ==
| Rank | Team |
|---|---|
| 1st place, gold medalist(s) | Soviet Union |
| 2nd place, silver medalist(s) | Yugoslavia |
| 3rd place, bronze medalist(s) | Hungary |
| 4 | (International Olympic Committee) Spain |
| 5 | Cuba |
| 6 | (International Olympic Committee) Netherlands |
| 7 | (International Olympic Committee) Australia |
| 8 | (International Olympic Committee) Italy |
| 9 | Romania |
| 10 | Greece |
| 11 | Sweden |
| 12 | Bulgaria |

1980 Men's Olympic champions

Soviet Union
Second title

== Team rosters ==
| Australia | Bulgaria | Cuba | Greece | Hungary | Italy |
| Robert Bryant; Martin Callaghan; Anthony Falson; Randall Goff; Andrew Kerr; Peter Montgomery; Julian Muspratt; David Neesham; Andrew Steward; Charles Turner; Michael Turner | Andrey Andreev; Biser Georgiev; Georgi Gospodinov; Asen Denchev; Kiril Kiryakov; Petar Kostadinov; Vasil Nanov; Antoni Partalev; Matei Popov; Volodya Sirakov; Nikola Stamatov | Carlos Benítez; Lazaro Costa; Orlando Cowley; Bárbaro Díaz; Oriel Domínguez; Nelson Domínguez; Oscar Periche; Arturo Ramos; Jorge Rizo; Gerardo Rodríguez; Pedro Rodríguez | Antonios Aronis; Ioannis Garifallos; Ioannis Giannouris; Kiriakos Giannopoulos; Andreas Gounas; Spyros Kapralos; Thomas Karalogos; Aristidis Kefalogiannis; Markellos Sitarenios; Sotirios Stathakis; Ioannis Vossos | Gábor Csapó; Tamás Faragó; György Gerendás; Károly Hauszler; György Horkai; István Kiss; László Kuncz; Endre Molnár; Attila Sudár; István Szívós; István Udvardi | Alberto Alberani; Romeo Collina; Gianni De Magistris; Vincenzo D'Angelo; Massimo Fondelli; Alfio Misaggi; Sante Misaggi; Umberto Panerai; Paolo Ragosa; Roldano Simeoni; Antonello Steardo |
| Netherlands | Romania | Spain | Soviet Union | Sweden | Yugoslavia |
| Ton Buunk; Wouly de Bie; Jan Jaap Korevaar; Nico Landeweerd; Ruud Misdorp; Dick Nieuwenhuizen; Eric Noordegraaf; Stan van Belkum; Aad van Mil; Hans van Zeeland; Jan Evert Veer | Viorel Costraș; Adrian Nastasiu; Dinu Popescu; Liviu Râducanu; Viorel Rus; Claudiu loan Rusu; Adrian Schervan; Florin Slâvei; Ilie Slâvei; Doru Spînu; Vasile Ungureanu | José Alcázar; Jorge Alonso; Antonio Aquilar; Jorge Carmona; Manuel Delgado; Antonio Esteller; Manuel Estiarte; Salvador Franch; Pedro Robert; Federico Sabriá; Gaspar Ventura | Vladimir Akimov; Aleksei Barkalov; Yevgeny Grishin; Mikhail Ivanov; Aleksandr Kabanov; Sergey Kotenko; Giorgi Mshvenieradze; Mait Riisman; Erkin Shagaev; Yevgeny Sharonov; Viacheslav Sobchenko | Per-Arne Andersson; Sören Carlsson; Peter Carlström; Arne Claesson; Tommy Danielson; Anders Flodqvist; Gunnar Johansson; Kenth Karlsson; Hans Lundén; Lars Skåål; Christer Stenberg | Milivoj Bebić; Zoran Gopčević; Milorad Krivokapić; Boško Lozica; Predrag Manojlović; Zoran Mustur; Damir Polić; Ratko Rudić; Zoran Roje; Slobodan Trifunović; Luka Vezilić |

== See also ==
- 1978 FINA Men's World Water Polo Championship
- 1982 FINA Men's World Water Polo Championship

== Sources ==
- PDF documents in the LA84 Foundation Digital Library:
  - Official Report of the 1980 Olympic Games, v.3 (download, archive) (pp. 458, 495–510)
- Water polo on the Olympedia website
  - Water polo at the 1980 Summer Olympics (men's tournament)
- Water polo on the Sports Reference website
  - Water polo at the 1980 Summer Games (men's tournament) (archived)
