= Udvardi =

Udvardi is a surname. Notable people with the surname include:

- István Udvardi (1960–2012), Hungarian water polo player
- Michael Udvardi, Australian plant biologist
