= Zoran Gopčević =

Water polo player

Personal information
- Born: 29 January 1955 Donji Orahovac, Yugoslavia
- Died: 30 September 2000 (aged 45)

Sport
- Sport: Water polo
Medal record
Representing Yugoslavia
Olympic Games
| Silver medal – second place | 1980 Moscow | Team competition |
World Championships
| Bronze medal – third place | 1978 West Berlin | Team competition |
European Championships
| Silver medal – second place | 1977 Jönköping | Team competition |
Mediterranean Games
| Gold medal – first place | 1979 Split | Team competition |

Zoran Gopčević (Serbian Cyrillic: Зоран Гопчевић; 29 January 1955 – 30 September 2000) was a water polo player. As a member of Yugoslavia's water polo team he won a silver medal at the 1980 Summer Olympics.

During the Croatian War of Independence, Gopčević was a prison guard at the Morinj prison camp.

== See also ==
- List of Olympic medalists in water polo (men)
- List of World Aquatics Championships medalists in water polo
