= Milivoj Bebić =

Croatian water polo player (born 1959)

Personal information
- Born: 29 August 1959 (age 67) Split, FPR Yugoslavia
- Height: 188 cm (6 ft 2 in)
- Weight: 88 kg (194 lb)

Sport
- Sport: Water polo
Medal record
Representing Yugoslavia
Olympic Games
Gold medal – first place	1984 Los Angeles	Team competition
Silver medal – second place	1980 Moscow	Team competition
Mediterranean Games
Gold medal – first place	1979 Split	Team competition
Gold medal – first place	1983 Casablanca	Team competition

Milivoj Bebić (born 29 August 1959) is a retired Croatian water polo player. He won a silver Olympic gold medal winner with Yugoslavia at the 1980 Summer Olympics and a gold medal at the 1984 Summer Olympics.

Bebić is a member of the FINA Technical Water Polo Committee (TWPC), which is the governing body for water polo in the world. He also serves as chairman of the Croatian water polo competition board and Croatian referee's committee.

== See also ==
- Yugoslavia men's Olympic water polo team records and statistics
- List of Olympic champions in men's water polo
- List of Olympic medalists in water polo (men)
- List of members of the International Swimming Hall of Fame
