= Monument to the Soviet Army, Sofia =

Monument located in Sofia, the capital of Bulgaria

Monument to the Soviet Army
- Паметник на Съветската армия
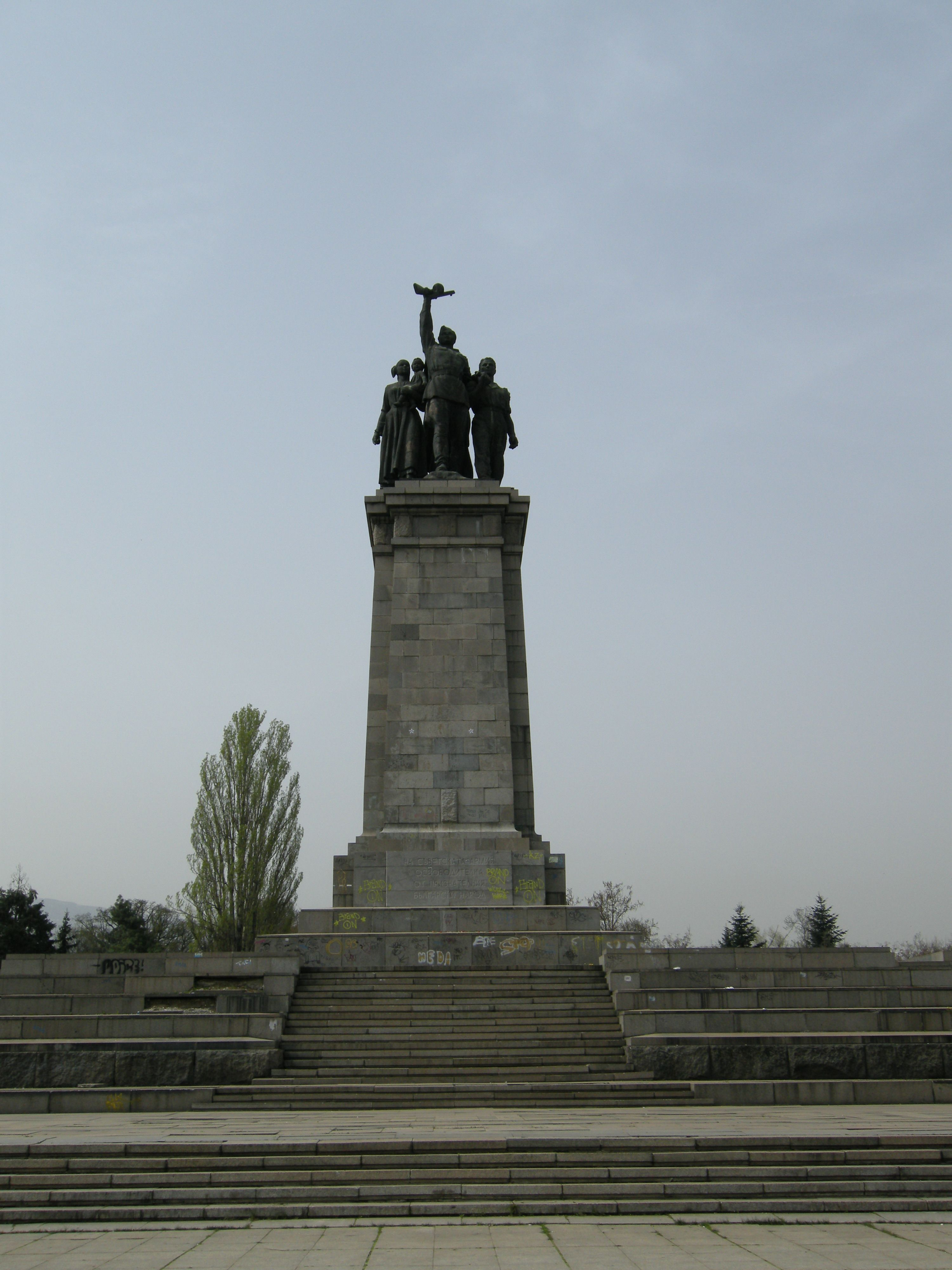
- The main pedestal in 2008
- Interactive map of Monument to the Soviet Army
- Location: Sofia, Bulgaria
- Coordinates: 42°41′26.48″N 23°20′4.18″E
- Height: 37 m
- Completion date: 1954
- Dismantled date: 2023 (partially)

The Monument to the Soviet Army (Bulgarian: Паметник на Съветската армия, Pametnik na Savetskata armiya) is a partially dismantled monument located in Sofia, the capital of Bulgaria.

There is a large park around the statue and the surrounding areas. It is a popular place where many young people gather. The monument is located on Tsar Osvoboditel Boulevard, near Orlov Most and the Sofia University. It portrays a soldier from the Soviet Army as a freedom fighter, surrounded by a Bulgarian woman, holding her baby, and a Bulgarian man. There are other, secondary sculptural composition parts of the memorial complex around the main monument, like the group of soldiers which have been used many times as a canvas by political artists. The monument was built in 1954 on the occasion of the 10th anniversary of the liberation by the Soviet Army. The monument was partially removed in December 2023.

== Painting of the Monument ==
=== 2011: Pop art comics composition ===
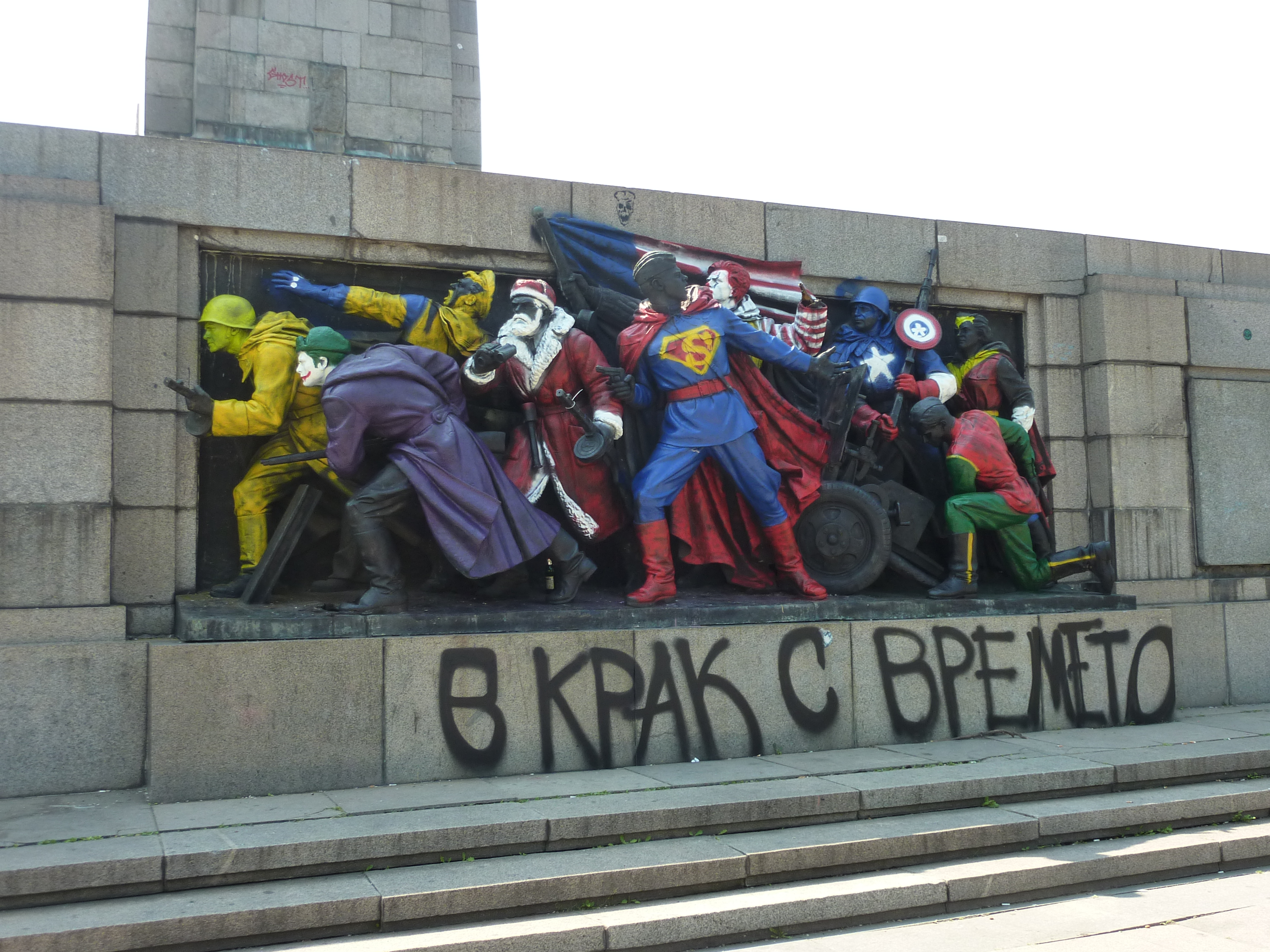
Popart composition, painted as comic book characters (June 18, 2011)

On June 17, 2011, the monument was painted overnight by a group of anonymous artists who call themselves Destructive Creation and who "dressed" the Soviet Army soldiers as the American popular culture characters Superman, Joker, Robin, Captain America, Ronald McDonald, Santa Claus, Wolverine, The Mask, and Wonder Woman. A caption was painted underneath which translates as "In pace with the times" (in Bulgarian "В крак с времето" – "V krak s vremeto").

The paint was removed three days later, in the late hours of June 20, 2011, though later it was declared that it was during the next morning. The event was widely covered by the international media; at the beginning, the unknown artists were even being compared to Banksy and called "Banksy of Bulgaria". It has provoked serious pro- and anti-Russian discussion in Bulgarian society. Meanwhile, Bulgarian Culture Minister Vezhdi Rashidov called the composition an act of vandalism.

The story was filmed in the short documentary In Step with the Time, directed by Anton Partalev, and includes anonymous interviews of the artists of Destructive Creation and various representatives of pro-Russian organizations in Bulgaria. The film won the second-place prize in the 2013 Festiwal IN OUT (In Out Festival) in Poland.

The monument is a place that delivers an explicit message of the distribution of power, with the superheroes acting as a metaphor for the American way of life. The painting showed the state of affairs in Bulgaria, split between the traditional relationship to the Soviet Union and the modern influence of Western capitalism.

=== 2012: Anti-ACTA ===
The monument again was used as a ground of artistic expression and social stance, when on February 10, 2012, the soldiers depicted were given Anonymous Guy Fawkes masks, the photo of this was spread in Sofia and throughout Bulgaria as an invitation to anti-ACTA protests held on February 11, 2012, in Bulgaria and Europe as a whole.

=== Other (2012–2013) ===
In addition, the monument was used as a ground for protest for the arrests of Pussy Riot in Russia, when on August 17, 2012, the soldiers were photographed with Pussy Riot masks.

On February 1, 2013, during Bulgaria's National Day for the Commemoration of the Victims of Communism, more commonly known throughout Europe as Black Ribbon Day, three of the figures of the monument were painted in white, red and green, the colours of the Bulgarian national flag.

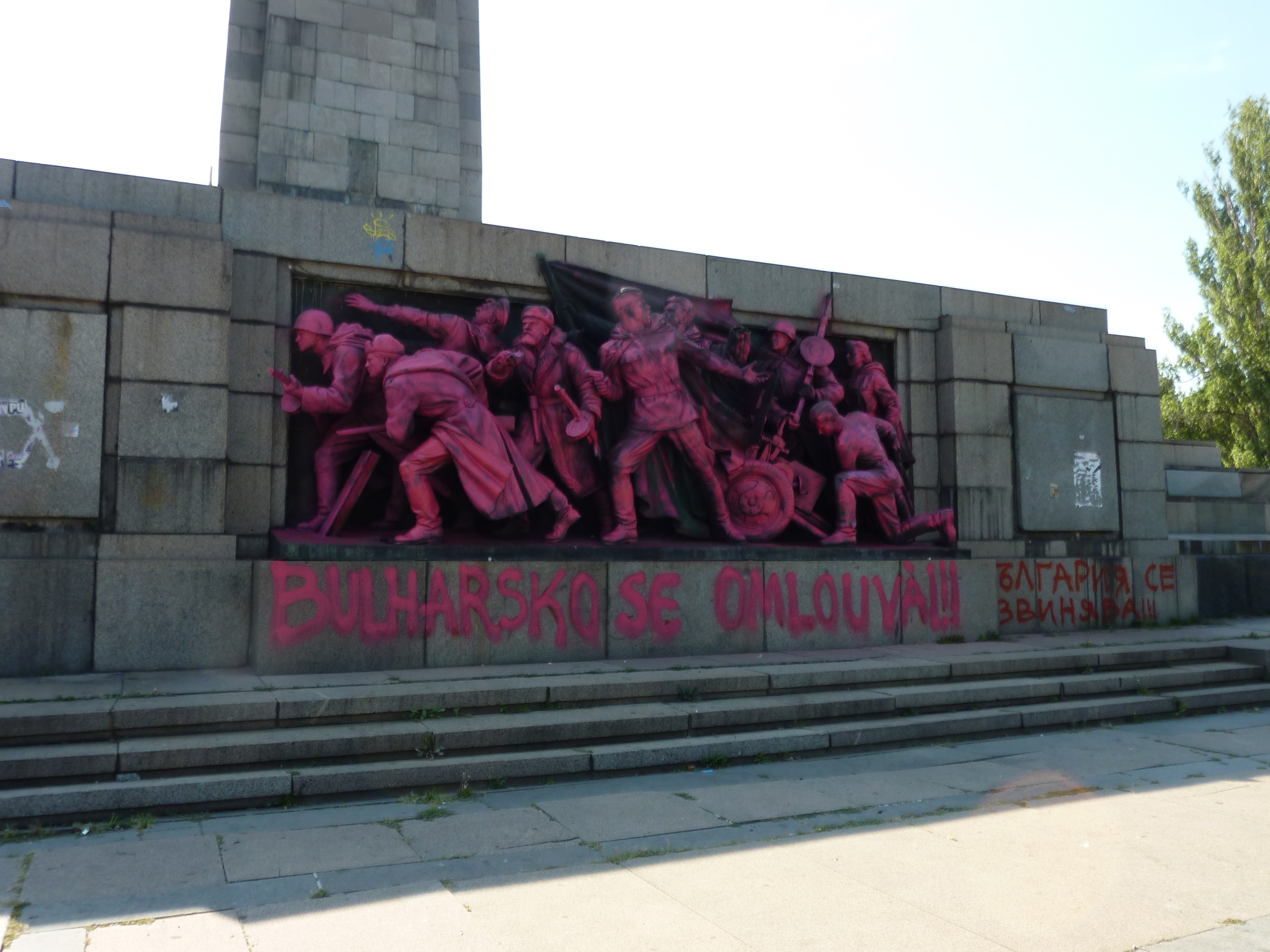
21 August 2013: The pink inscriptions on the monument apologise for Bulgarian participation in the occupation of Prague in 1968

=== 2013: Apology for Prague '68 ===
On August 21, 2013, unknown artists painted the monument in pink, in honour of the anniversary of the 1968 Prague Spring. There was an inscription both in Bulgarian and in Czech which read "Bulgaria apologizes". The pink colour is a reference to the painting of the Monument to Soviet Tank Crews in Prague by David Černý in 1991. On August 22, Russia officially demanded sanctions for those responsible for the monument's desecration and that Bulgaria take immediate measures to prevent such incidents in the future. Foreign Minister Kristian Vigenin asked not to dramatize the painting and stated that "Bulgaria has international commitments to maintain these monuments. Desecration of a monument is something that should not happen. I don't think that it should cause much extreme reaction on this issue, because the institutions in Bulgaria took immediate measures."

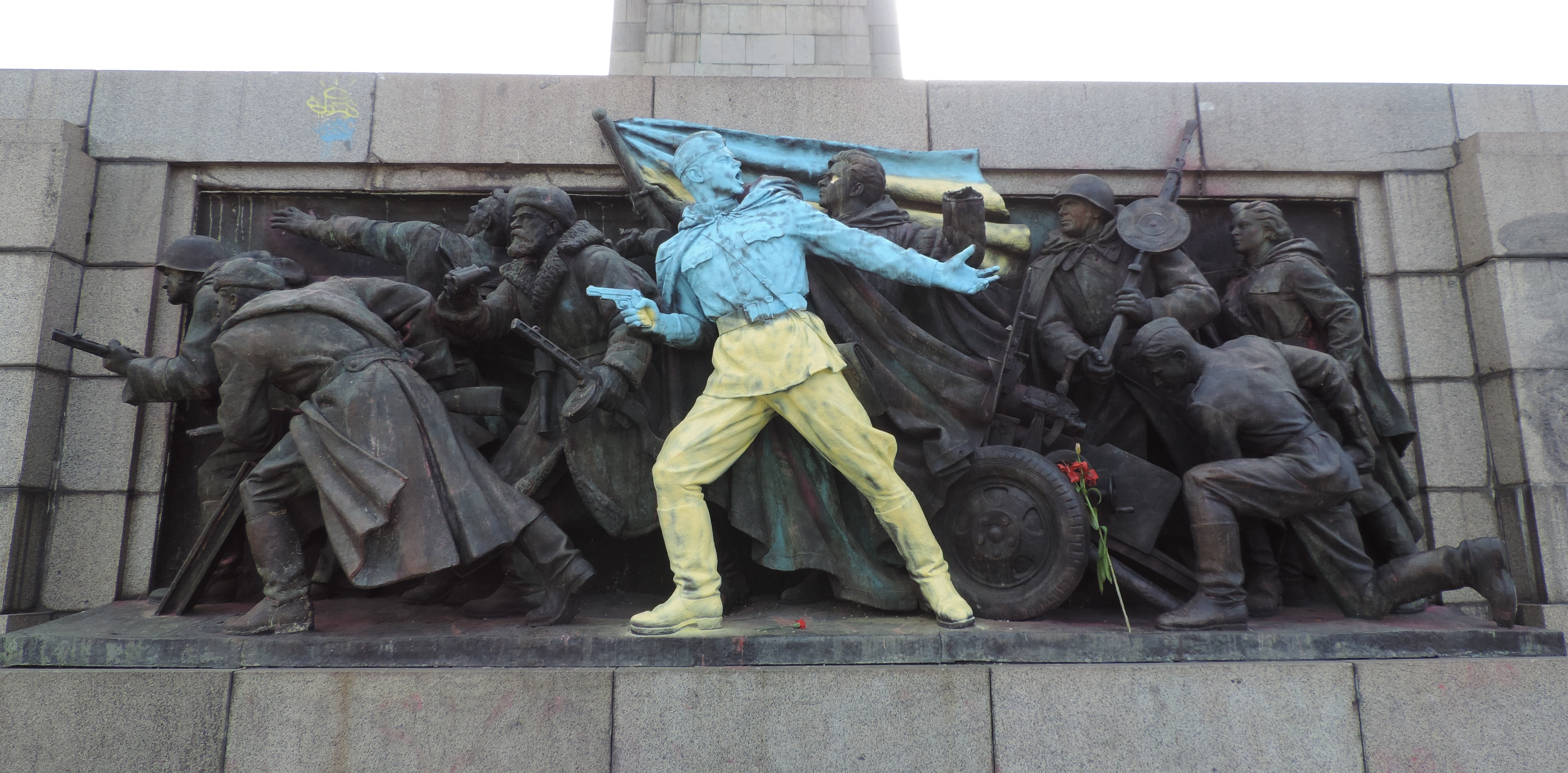
23 February 2014: The "Glory to Ukraine" installation

=== 2014: "Glory to Ukraine" and "Hands off Ukraine" ===
On 23 February 2014, the monument was once more painted by unknown perpetrators, this time the statue of one of the soldiers and the flag above it were painted in the national colours of Ukraine. The phrase "Glory to Ukraine" was written in Ukrainian on the monument, as well as a reference to Russian President Vladimir Putin (who was called "Kaputin", from the German kaputt, meaning broken). The act was in support of the 2014 Ukrainian Revolution. The same day a photo of the painted monument became Best of the Day in Euronews with the title: "Bulgaria: Glory to Ukraine."

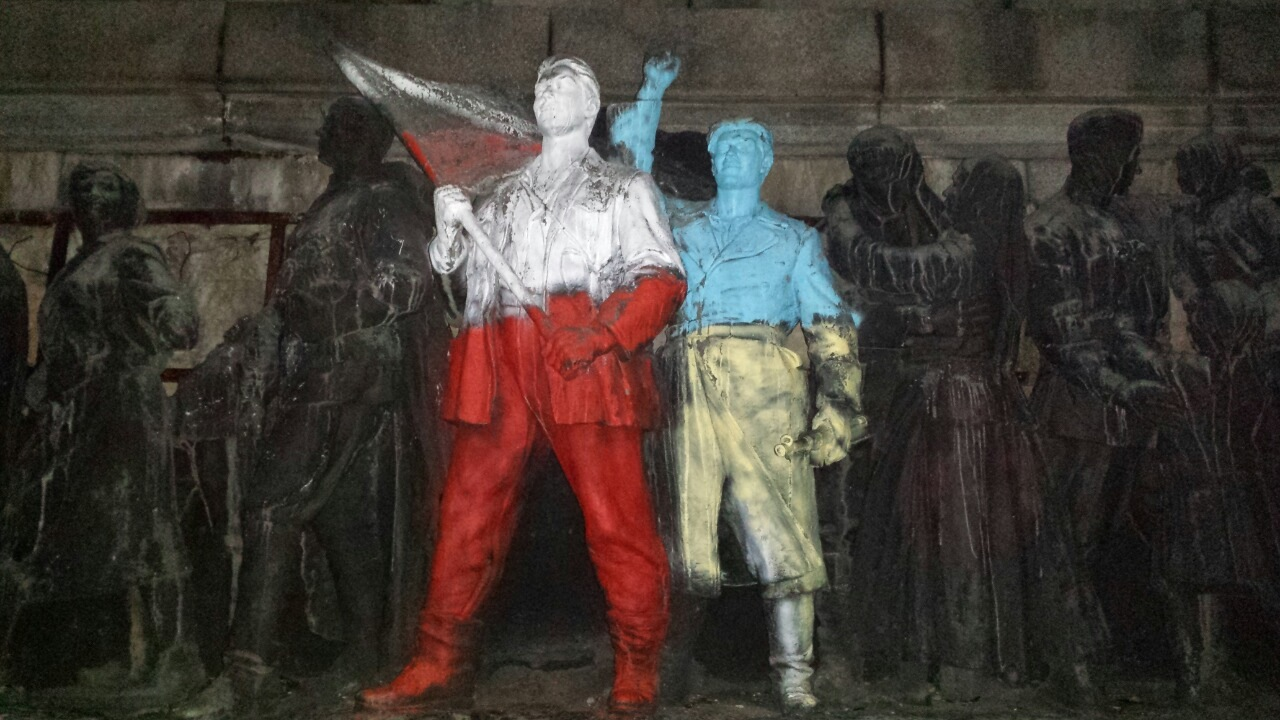
12 April 2014: the Polish and Ukrainian soldiers standing together against the Katyn massacre

On February 24, the Russian Ministry of Foreign Affairs expressed outrage, saying that "News was greeted with a feeling of deep resentment in Russia of yet another case of vandalism directed against the Soviet Army monument in the center of the capital of Bulgaria, Sofia, during the night of February 23." The Russian Ministry sent a protest note to their Bulgarian counterparts with a request to "conduct a thorough investigation of this hooligan incident and to accuse those guilty of such an unlawful conduct and also take appropriate measures to bring the memorial back to its normal state."

On March 2, the monument was painted with another inscription defending Ukraine, this time as a reaction to the invasion of Russian troops of the Crimean Peninsula. The inscription reads "Hands off Ukraine" and crosses out the dedication "for the liberator Soviet Army from the grateful Bulgarian people."

On April 12 one of the statues was painted in the colours of the Polish flag, with another one of the statues standing right behind being painted with the Ukrainian colours. Under the soldiers there is an inscription remembering about the Katyn massacre.

=== 2022: Reaction to the invasion of Ukraine by Russia ===
The monument once again got painted in the colors of the Ukrainian flag like in 2014 following the attack on Ukraine by Russian forces. Three sides of the monument were vandalized in 2022.

== Partial removal ==
In 1993, the Sofia Municipal Council considered removing the monument. However, there was insufficient public support and thus the monument was not removed.

A survey of 1003 Sofia citizens who were eligible to vote was undertaken between 30 September and 3 October 2023, indicating that 30.7% wanted the monument to remain in place, 27.8% agreed with relocating it to a museum, and 22% wanted it demolished.

After the monument was illegally painted to resemble comic heroes in 2011, several politicians started to support the removal of the monument. On June 29, a hearing was scheduled in Sofia, however opinions were still split and there were not enough votes to support the move.

Dismantling of the main sculptures in December 2023

A 2019 online survey of 100 Bulgarians showed that more than two-thirds saw communist-era monuments as important for the country's "national identity."

In August 2023, the decision was made to relocate the monument to the Museum of Socialist Art. However, this was later cancelled, as it was felt that the sculptures would take up too much space in the museum, effectively leaving it without green areas, and could overshadow the rest of the museum's exhibits. It has been proposed to move the sculptures to the Buzludzha monument.

On 12 December 2023, the dismantling of some of the figures started. The figures on top of the main structure were removed by the 19th of December.

Since then, the monument has been fenced off.

== Sculptures ==
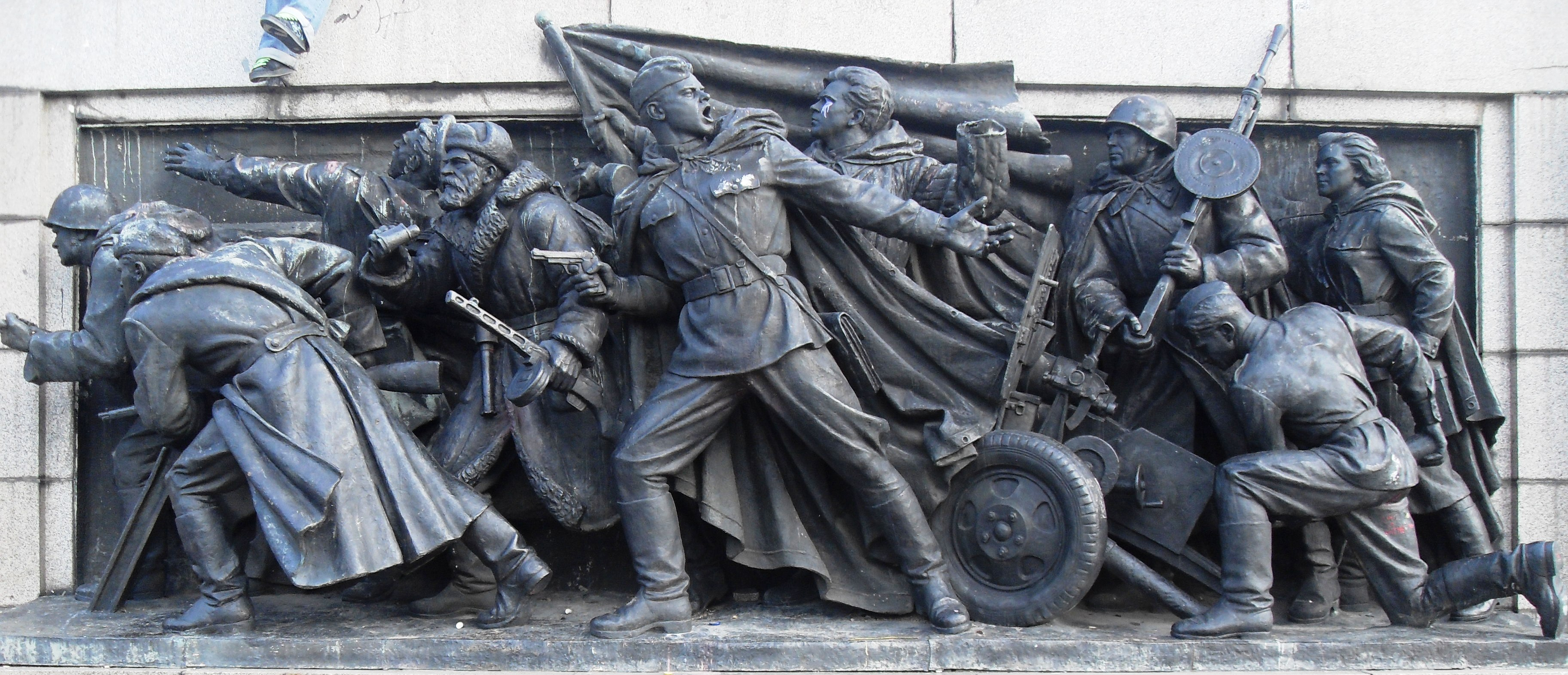
Sculpture composition on the west side

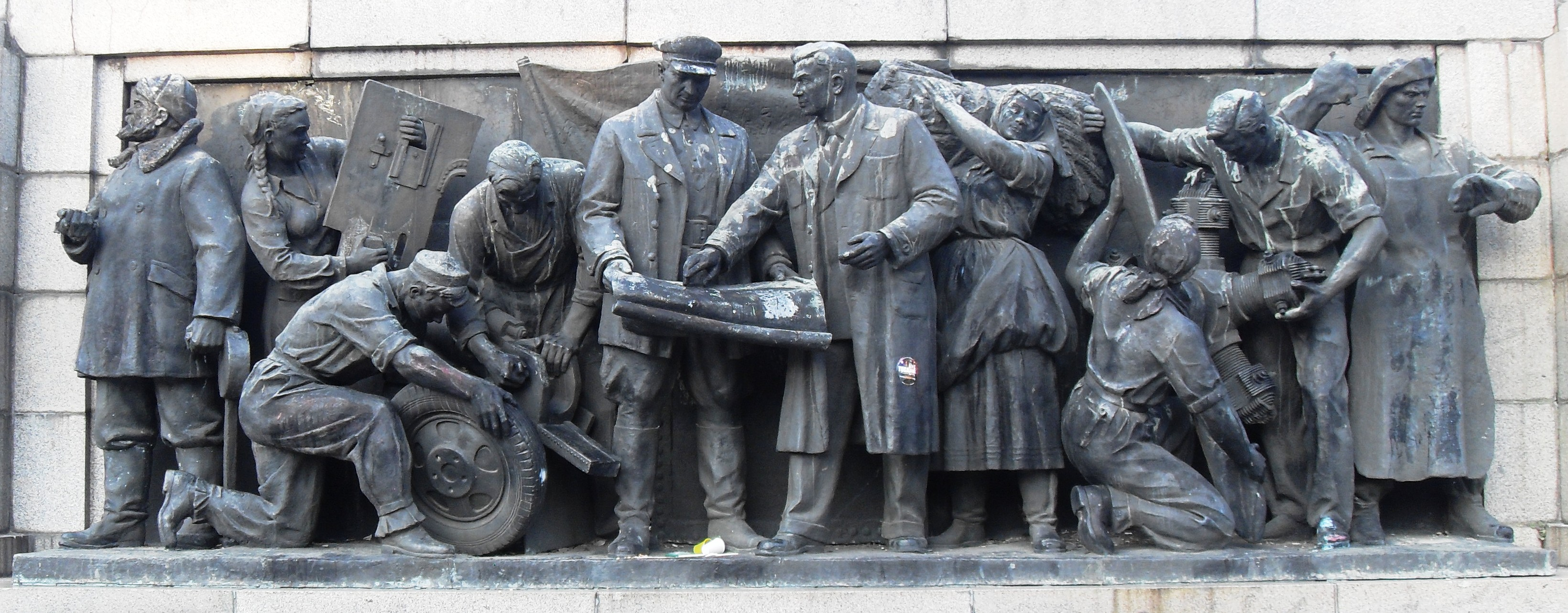
Sculpture composition on the south side

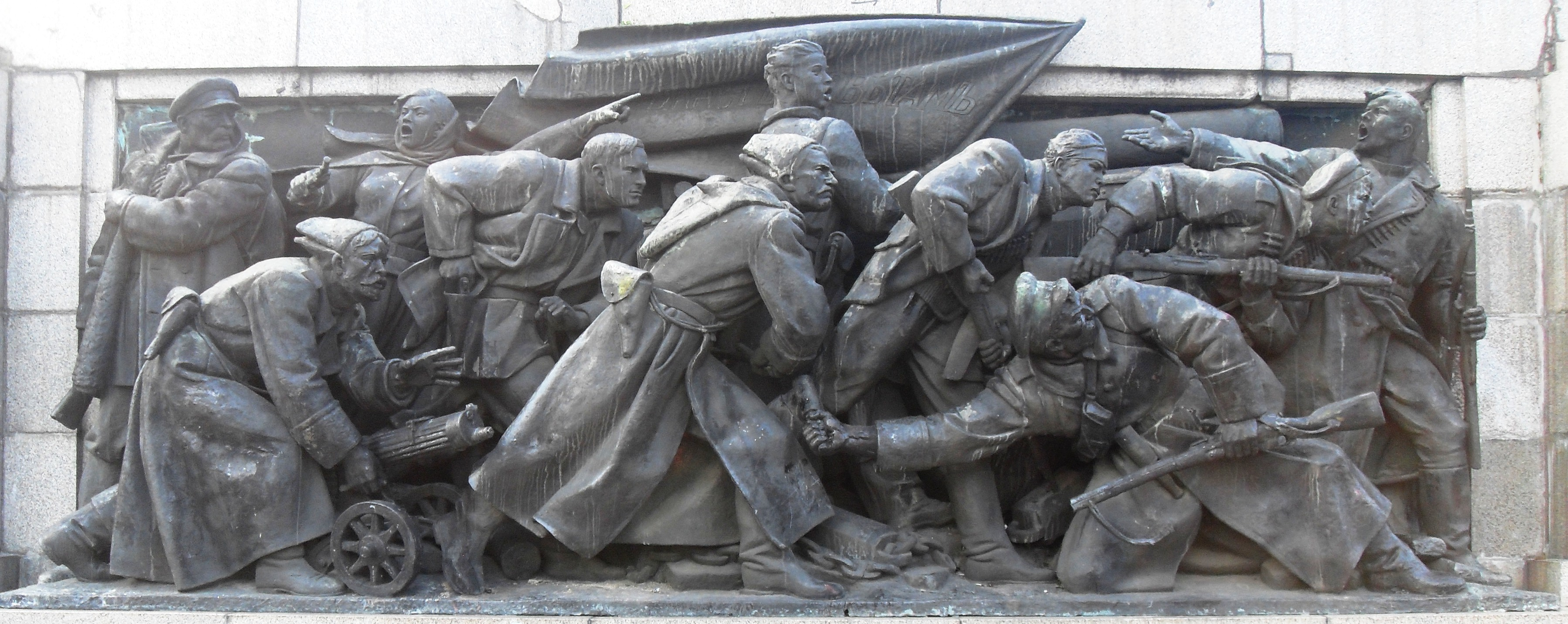
Sculpture composition on the east side
