= Donji Orahovac =

Donji Orahovac may refer to:

- Donji Orahovac, Trebinje, Bosnia and Herzegovina
- Donji Orahovac, Kotor, Montenegro
