= Jorge Alonso =

Jorge Alonso may refer to:

- Jorge Alonso (footballer) (born 1985), Spanish footballer
- Jorge L. Alonso (born 1966), United States district judge
- Jorge Alonso (water polo) (born 1958), Spanish water polo player
- Jorge Alonso Treviño (born 1935), governor of Nuevo León, Mexico
