= Vezilić =

Vezilić is a surname. Notable people with the surname include:

- Aleksije Vezilić (1753–1792), Serbian lyric poet
- Luka Vezilić (born 1948), former water polo player
