= Kiryakov =

Kiryakov (Russian: Кирьяко́в), female form Kiryakova (Russian: Кирьяко́ва), is a surname. Notable people with this surname include:

- Borislav Kiryakov (born 1963), Bulgarian alpine skier
- Iliyan Kiryakov (born 1967), Bulgarian football player
- Ivan Kiryakov (born 1943), Bulgarian boxer
- Kiril Kiryakov (born 1953), Bulgarian water polo player
- Sergei Kiryakov (footballer, born 1998), Russian football player
- Stefani Kiryakova (born 2001), Bulgarian group rhythmic gymnast
- Tanyu Kiryakov (born 1963), Bulgarian pistol shooter
- Virginia Kiryakova, Bulgarian mathematician
- Yegor Kiryakov (born 1974), Russian footballer
