= Damir Polić =

Croatian water polo player

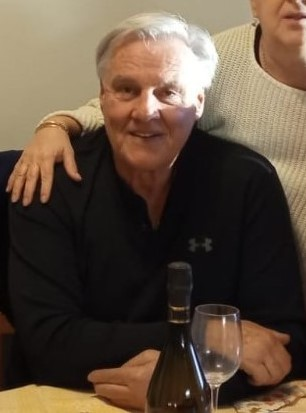
- Damir Polić

Personal information
- Born: 3 April 1953 (age 73) Split, PR Croatia, Yugoslavia

Sport
- Sport: Water polo
Medal record
Representing Yugoslavia
Olympic Games
Silver medal – second place	1980 Moscow	Team competition
World Championships
Bronze medal – third place	1973 Belgrade	Team competition
Bronze medal – third place	1978 West Berlin	Team competition
European Championships
Silver medal – second place	1977 Jönköping	Team competition
Mediterranean Games
Gold medal – first place	1979 Split	Team competition
Silver medal – second place	1975 Algiers	Team competition

Damir Polić (born 3 April 1953) is a former Croatian water polo player. As a member of Yugoslavia's water polo team he won a silver medal at the 1980 Summer Olympics.

== See also ==
- List of Olympic medalists in water polo (men)
- List of World Aquatics Championships medalists in water polo
