= Slobodan Trifunović =

Water polo player

Personal information
- Born: 3 February 1956 (age 70) Belgrade, Yugoslavia
- Height: 180 cm (5 ft 11 in)
- Weight: 80 kg (176 lb)
Medal record
Representing Yugoslavia
Olympic Games
Silver medal – second place	1980 Moscow	Team competition
European Championships
Silver medal – second place	1977 Jönköping	Team competition
Mediterranean Games
Gold medal – first place	1979 Split	Team competition

Slobodan Trifunović (Serbian: Слободан Трифуновић, born 3 February 1956) is a former water polo player. As a member of Yugoslavia's water polo team he won a silver medal at the 1980 Summer Olympics.

== See also ==
- List of Olympic medalists in water polo (men)
