= José Alcázar =

Spanish water polo player (born 1957)

Personal information
- Born: 10 April 1957 (age 69) Barcelona, Spain

Sport
- Sport: Water polo
Medal record
Representing Spain
Mediterranean Games
Bronze medal – third place	1979 Split	Team competition

José Alcázar (born 10 April 1957) is a Spanish water polo player. He competed in the men's tournament at the 1980 Summer Olympics.
