= Neesham =

Neesham is a surname. Notable people with the surname include:

- David Neesham (born 1946), Australian water polo player
- Gerard Neesham (born 1954), Australian football player
- James Neesham (born 1990), New Zealand cricketer
- Tim Neesham (born 1979), Australian water polo player
