= Boško Lozica =

Water polo player

Personal information
- Born: November 28, 1952 (age 73) Korčula, Yugoslavia

Sport
- Sport: Water polo
Medal record
Representing Yugoslavia
Olympic Games
Silver medal – second place	1980 Moscow	Team competition
World Championships
Bronze medal – third place	1973 Belgrade	Team competition
Bronze medal – third place	1978 West Berlin	Team competition
European Championships
Silver medal – second place	1977 Jönköping	Team competition
Bronze medal – third place	1974 Vienna	Team competition
Mediterranean Games
Gold medal – first place	1979 Split	Team competition
Silver medal – second place	1975 Algiers	Team competition

Boško Lozica (born November 28, 1952, in Korčula, Yugoslavia) is a former water polo player. As a member of Yugoslavia's water polo team he won a silver medal at the 1980 Summer Olympics.

Lozica's father Pero Lozica was a one-time president of the Yugoslav Water Polo Federation, and Lozica himself has been a member of the board of directors of the Croatian Water Polo Federation.

== See also ==
- List of Olympic medalists in water polo (men)
- List of World Aquatics Championships medalists in water polo
