= Federico Sabriá =

Spanish water polo player (born 1958)

Personal information
- Nationality: Spanish
- Born: 17 August 1958 (age 67) Barcelona, Spain

Sport
- Sport: Water polo
Medal record
Representing Spain
Mediterranean Games
Bronze medal – third place	1979 Split	Team competition

Federico Sabriá (born 17 August 1958) is a Spanish water polo player. He competed in the men's tournament at the 1980 Summer Olympics. He is now a professor of operations at IESE Business School.
