= Biser Georgiev =

Biser Georgiev can refer to:

- Biser Georgiev (water polo) (born 1953), Bulgarian Olympic water polo player
- Biser Georgiev (wrestler) (born 1973), Bulgarian Olympic wrestler
