= Manuel Delgado =

Spanish water polo player (born 1955)

Personal information
- Nationality: Spanish
- Born: 19 May 1955 (age 71) Barcelona, Spain

Sport
- Sport: Water polo
Medal record
Representing Spain
Mediterranean Games
Bronze medal – third place	1979 Split	Team competition

Manuel Delgado (born 19 May 1955) is a Spanish water polo player. He competed in the men's tournament at the 1980 Summer Olympics.

== See also ==
- Spain men's Olympic water polo team records and statistics
- List of men's Olympic water polo tournament goalkeepers
