= Predrag Manojlović =

Predrag Manojlović may refer to:

- Predrag Miki Manojlović (born 1950), Serbian actor
- Predrag Manojlović (water polo) (1951–2014), Yugoslav water polo player
