= Anatoly Akimov (water polo) =

Russian water polo player (1947–2002)

Personal information
- Native name: Анатолий Иванович Акимов
- Full name: Anatoly Ivanovich Akimov
- Born: 15 November 1947 Moscow, Soviet Union
- Died: 28 June 2002 (aged 54) Moscow, Russia
- Height: 181 cm (5 ft 11 in)
- Weight: 84 kg (185 lb)

Sport
- Club: Soviet Navy
Medal record
Water polo
Representing the Soviet Union
Olympic Games
Gold medal – first place	1972 Munich	Team competition
World Championships
Silver medal – second place	1973 Belgrade	Team competition
European Championships
Gold medal – first place	1970 Barcelona	Team competition

Anatoly Ivanovich Akimov (Russian: Анатолий Иванович Акимов, 15 November 1947 – 28 June 2002) was a Russian water polo player who competed for the Soviet Union in the 1972 Summer Olympics.

Akimov had one sister Tatiana and three brothers, Victor, Nikolay, and Vladimir. All brothers were national water polo players, and Vladimir also won an Olympic gold medal. After retiring from competitions, Anatoly took various odd jobs, including a driver.

== See also ==
- Soviet Union men's Olympic water polo team records and statistics
- List of Olympic champions in men's water polo
- List of Olympic medalists in water polo (men)
- List of World Aquatics Championships medalists in water polo
