= Sören Carlsson =

Swedish water polo player

Personal information
- Nationality: Swedish
- Born: 29 July 1953 (age 71); Gothenburg, Sweden

Sport
- Sport: Water polo

Sören Carlsson (born 29 July 1953) is a Swedish water polo player. He competed in the men's tournament at the 1980 Summer Olympics.
