= Zoran Mustur =

Water polo player

Personal information
- Born: 12 July 1953 (age 72) Herceg Novi, Yugoslavia
- Height: 185 cm (6 ft 1 in)
- Weight: 86 kg (190 lb)
Medal record
Men's water polo
Representing Yugoslavia
Olympic Games
Silver medal – second place	1980 Moscow	Team competition
World Championships
Bronze medal – third place	1978 West Berlin	Team competition
European Championships
Silver medal – second place	1977 Jönköping	Team competition
Mediterranean Games
Gold medal – first place	1979 Split	Team Competition

Zoran Mustur (Serbian Cyrillic: Зоран Мустур, born 12 July 1953) is a former water polo player. As a member of Yugoslavia's water polo team he won a silver medal at the 1980 Summer Olympics.

== See also ==
- List of Olympic medalists in water polo (men)
- List of World Aquatics Championships medalists in water polo
