= Vasil Nanov =

Bulgarian water polo player (born 1959)

Personal information
- Nationality: Bulgarian
- Born: 27 February 1959 (age 66)

Sport
- Sport: Water polo

Vasil Nanov (Bulgarian: Васил Нанов, born 27 February 1959) is a Bulgarian water polo player. He competed in the men's tournament at the 1980 Summer Olympics.
