= Volodya Sirakov =

Bulgarian water polo player (born 1953)

Personal information
- Nationality: Bulgarian
- Born: 27 August 1953 (age 71)

Sport
- Sport: Water polo

Volodya Sirakov (Bulgarian: Володя Сираков, born 27 August 1953) is a Bulgarian water polo player. He competed in the men's tournament at the 1980 Summer Olympics.
