= Mait Riisman =

Estonian water polo player (1956–2018)

Personal information
- Born: 23 September 1956 Tallinn, then part of Estonian SSR, Soviet Union
- Died: 17 May 2018 (aged 61) Moscow, Russia

Sport
- Sport: Water polo
Medal record
Representing the Soviet Union
Olympic Games
Gold medal – first place	1980 Moscow	Team competition

Mait Riisman (23 September 1956 – 17 May 2018) was an Estonian water polo player who played for the Soviet Union national water polo team, winning the gold medal in the 1980 Summer Olympics in Moscow.

== Playing career ==
Riisman started playing water polo in 1966 at Kalev Swimming School in Tallinn. In 1974, he moved to Moscow and continued training in the Moscow State University's team and in the Soviet Union team. Riisman was a member of the Moscow State University team 1974–83, Torpedo Moscow 1983–84 and Dynamo Moscow 1984–88.

Riisman won the gold medal at the 1980 Moscow Olympics and the European Cup Winners' Cup in 1976. At Soviet Union's championships he won four gold medals (1979, 1985–87) four silver medals (1975, 1977, 1980, 1981) and a bronze medal (1976).

== Coaching career ==
In 1989-91, Riisman was the water polo coach of Dynamo Moscow and the second coach of the Soviet Union team. From 1991 to 1996, he worked as a coach of the French club Racing Club de France, the team won silver (1994) and bronze (1993) at the French championship. From 1996 to 2004, Riisman was the head coach of the Dynamo Moscow water polo team, winning the European Cup Winners' Cup (1999–2000) and became the champion of Russia four times (1997–98, 1999–00, 2001–02). From 1997–2000, Riisman was also the second coach of the Russian water polo team. In 2005, Riisman was elected as the chairman of the Council of Coaches of the Russian Water Polo Federation. From 2001 to 2011, he was the president and general manager of the Dynamo Moscow water polo club, and later an adviser to the president. Riisman was an honorary member of the Estonian Olympic Committee (2002) and in 2006 he received the EOC honorary medal.

== See also ==
- Soviet Union men's Olympic water polo team records and statistics
- List of Olympic champions in men's water polo
- List of Olympic medalists in water polo (men)
