= Asen Denchev =

Bulgarian water polo player (born 1959)

Personal information
- Nationality: Bulgarian
- Born: 17 September 1959 (age 65)

Sport
- Sport: Water polo

Asen Denchev (Bulgarian: Асен Денчев, born 17 September 1959) is a Bulgarian water polo player. He competed in the men's tournament at the 1980 Summer Olympics.
