= Károly Hauszler =

Hungarian water polo player (1952–2023)

Personal information
- Born: March 19, 1952 Budapest, Hungary
- Died: October 28, 2023 (aged 71) Budapest, Hungary

Sport
- Sport: Water polo
Medal record
Representing Hungary
Olympic Games
Bronze medal – third place	1980 Moscow	Team competition

Károly Hauszler (19 March 1952 – 28 October 2023) was a Hungarian water polo player who competed in the 1980 Summer Olympics. He was born in Budapest on 19 March 1952, and died there on 28 October 2023, at the age of 71.

== See also ==
- Hungary men's Olympic water polo team records and statistics
- List of Olympic medalists in water polo (men)
- List of men's Olympic water polo tournament goalkeepers
