= Hans Lundén =

Swedish water polo player

Personal information
- Nationality: Swedish
- Born: 13 August 1957 (age 67); Stockholm, Sweden

Sport
- Sport: Water polo

Hans Lundén (born 13 August 1957) is a Swedish water polo player. He competed in the men's tournament at the 1980 Summer Olympics.
