= Nikola Stamatov =

Bulgarian water polo player (born 1956)

Personal information
- Nationality: Bulgarian
- Born: 2 September 1956 (age 68)

Sport
- Sport: Water polo

Nikola Stamatov (Bulgarian: Никола Стаматов; born 2 September 1956) is a Bulgarian water polo player. He competed in the men's tournament at the 1980 Summer Olympics.
