= Predrag Manojlović (water polo) =

Yugoslav water polo player

Personal information
- Born: 20 September 1951 Split, Yugoslavia
- Died: 14 September 2014 (aged 62) Belgrade, Serbia
- Height: 190 cm (6 ft 3 in)
- Weight: 105 kg (231 lb)

Sport
- Sport: Water polo
Medal record
Representing Yugoslavia
Olympic Games
| Silver medal – second place | 1980 Moscow | Team competition |
World Championships
| Bronze medal – third place | 1973 Belgrade | Team competition |
| Bronze medal – third place | 1978 West Berlin | Team competition |
European Championships
| Silver medal – second place | 1977 Jönköping | Team competition |
| Bronze medal – third place | 1974 Vienna | Team competition |
Mediterranean Games
| Gold medal – first place | 1975 Algiers | Team competition |
| Silver medal – second place | 1979 Split | Team competition |

Predrag Manojlović (Serbian: Предраг Манојловић 20 September 1951 – 14 September 2014) was a Yugoslav water polo player. As a member of Yugoslavia's water polo team he won a silver medal at the 1980 Summer Olympics. His brother Nenad was an international player and coach in the sport.

== See also ==
- List of Olympic medalists in water polo (men)
- List of World Aquatics Championships medalists in water polo
