= Andrey Andreev (water polo) =

Bulgarian water polo player (born 1957)

Personal information
- Nationality: Bulgarian
- Born: 1 June 1957 (age 67)

Sport
- Sport: Water polo

Andrey Andreev (Bulgarian: Андрей Андреев, born 1 June 1957) is a Bulgarian water polo player. He competed in the men's tournament at the 1980 Summer Olympics.
