= Romeo Collina =

Italian water polo player (born 1953)

Personal information
- Nationality: Italian
- Born: 7 June 1953 (age 73) Rome, Italy

Sport
- Sport: Water polo
Medal record
Representing Italy
World Championships
Gold medal – first place	1978 West Berlin	Team competition
European Championships
Bronze medal – third place	1977 Jönköping	Team competition
Mediterranean Games
Silver medal – second place	1979 Split	Team competition
Bronze medal – third place	1983 Casablanca	Team competition

Romeo Collina (born 7 June 1953) is an Italian former water polo player. He competed at the 1980 Summer Olympics and the 1984 Summer Olympics.

While playing for the Italian Olimpic team, Collina was also a student of the Faculty of Economics of the Sapienza University of Rome and he graduated cum laude with Professor Federico Caffè. The relationship between the student and his supervisor generated some humorous comments since Professor Caffè was very short (only 4' 11" tall) and Collina very tall (6' 7" tall). They develop a fruitful academic collaboration which led, after the graduation, Collina to find a job with the FIAT corporation, at the time the largest Italian company. While Collina moved to Turin eager to start his work as manager and devote less time to sporting, he discovered that he was seconded to FIAT Torino (later Sisport), the company water polo team. Professor Caffè often quoted the case as a typical example of the wide-ranging activities carried out by large corporatioins.

== See also ==
- List of world champions in men's water polo
- List of World Aquatics Championships medalists in water polo
