= Vladimir Akimov (water polo) =

Soviet water polo player

Personal information
- Born: 20 July 1953 Moscow, Soviet Union
- Died: 5 October 1987 (aged 34) Moscow, Soviet Union
- Height: 184 cm (6 ft 0 in)
- Weight: 80 kg (176 lb)

Sport
- Club: Soviet Navy
Medal record
Representing the Soviet Union
Olympic Games
Gold medal – first place	1980 Moscow	Team competition
World Championships
Gold medal – first place	1982 Guayaquil	Team competition
European Championships
Silver medal – second place	1981 Split	Team competition

Vladimir Ivanovich Akimov (Russian: Владимир Иванович Акимов, 20 July 1953 – 5 October 1987) was a Soviet water polo player who won a gold medal in the 1980 Summer Olympics in Moscow.

Akimov had one sister Tatiana and three brothers, Victor, Nikolay, and Anatoly. All brothers were national water polo players, and Anatoly also won an Olympic gold medal.

Akimov was married and had a son Roman. In 1987 he was assaulted and died of a head injury.

== See also ==
- Soviet Union men's Olympic water polo team records and statistics
- List of Olympic champions in men's water polo
- List of Olympic medalists in water polo (men)
- List of world champions in men's water polo
- List of World Aquatics Championships medalists in water polo
