= Gunnar Johansson (water polo) =

Swedish water polo player (born 1957)

Personal information
- Nationality: Swedish
- Born: 20 May 1957 (age 69) Söderhamn, Sweden

Sport
- Sport: Water polo

Gunnar Johansson (born 20 May 1957) is a Swedish water polo player. He competed in the men's tournament at the 1980 Summer Olympics.
