= Luka Vezilić =

Water polo player

Luko Vezilić
Personal information
- Born: 2 July 1948 (age 77) Dubrovnik, Yugoslavia

Sport
- Sport: Water polo
Medal record
Representing Yugoslavia
Olympic Games
Silver medal – second place	1980 Moscow	Team competition
European Championships
Silver medal – second place	1977 Jönköping	Team competition
Bronze medal – third place	1974 Vienna	Team competition
Mediterranean Games
Gold medal – first place	1979 Split	Team competition

Luko Vezilić (born 2 July 1948) is a Yugoslav former water polo player. As a member of Yugoslavia's water polo team he won a silver medal at the 1980 Summer Olympics.

== See also ==
- Yugoslavia men's Olympic water polo team records and statistics
- List of Olympic medalists in water polo (men)
- List of men's Olympic water polo tournament goalkeepers
