= Petar Kostadinov (water polo) =

Bulgarian water polo player (born 1954)

Personal information
- Nationality: Bulgarian
- Born: 19 May 1954 (age 71)

Sport
- Sport: Water polo

Petar Kostadinov (Bulgarian: Петър Костадинов, born 19 May 1954) is a Bulgarian water polo player. He competed in the men's tournament at the 1980 Summer Olympics.
