= Antonio Aguilar (water polo) =

Spanish water polo player (born 1960)

Personal information
- Full name: Antonio Aguilar Chastellain
- Born: 7 April 1960 (age 66) Barcelona, Spain
- Height: 1.79 m (5 ft 10 in)
- Weight: 77 kg (170 lb)

Sport
- Sport: Water polo
Medal record
Representing Spain
European Championships
Bronze medal – third place	1983 Rome	Team competition
Mediterranean Games
Silver medal – second place	1983 Casablanca	Team competition
Bronze medal – third place	1979 Split	Team competition

Antonio Aguilar Chastellain (Note: In this Spanish name, the first or paternal surname is Aguilar and the second or maternal family name is Chastellain.) (born 7 April 1960) is a Spanish water polo player. He competed in the 1980 and 1984 Summer Olympics.
