= Olympic Pool, Moscow =

Swimming venue in Moscow, Russia

Coordinates: 55°42′47″N 37°33′29″E

Olympic Pool
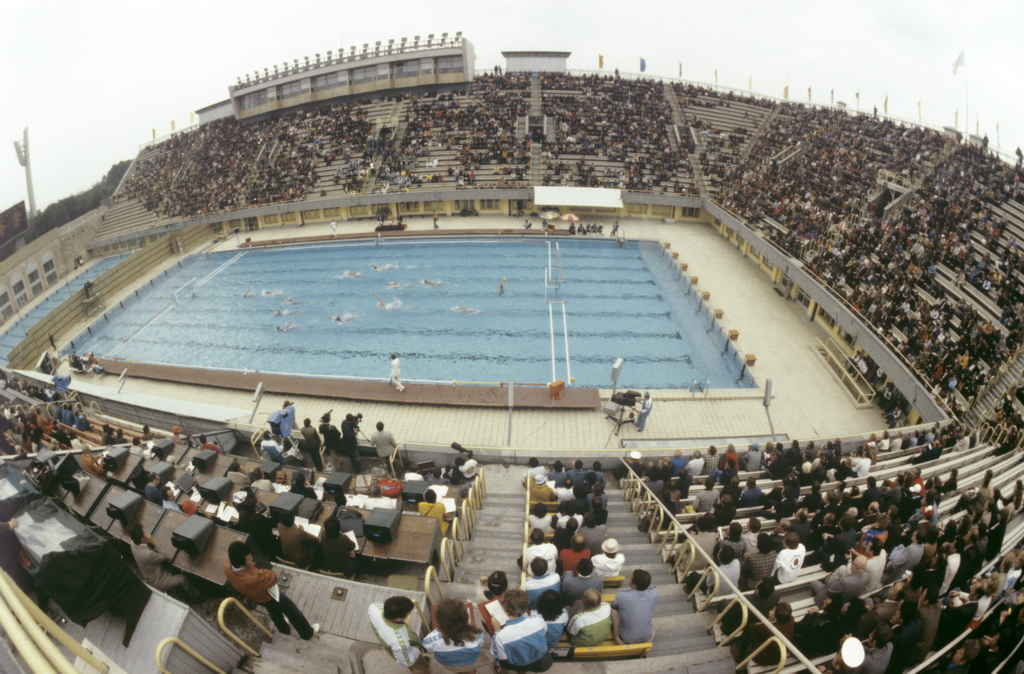
- Swimming Pool of the Central Lenin Stadium in 1980. RIAN photo
- Interactive map of Olympic Pool
- Full name: Olympic Pool
- Address: Moscow, Russia
- Capacity: 10,500
- Pool size: 50 m × 22 m (164 ft × 72 ft)

Construction
- Opened: 1957

The Olympic Pool, formerly Swimming Pool of the Central Lenin Stadium is an aquatics center that is part of the Luzhniki Sports Complex in Moscow, Russia. It was opened in 1957 and renovated in 1980. The 10,500-seat venue hosted water polo events at the 1980 Summer Olympics. It also hosted events of the 1973 Summer Universiade, 12th World Festival of Youth and Students, 1986 Goodwill Games, Spartakiads of the Peoples of the USSR and others.

Google satellite images show that the Olympic Pool has been demolished. In official reports by the mayor of Moscow, Sergei Sobyanin states that it will be reconstructed as a Multipurpose Aquatic Centre (link to the full report). "Apart from the swimming pool, the facility will include a water area with fun rides, a fitness club and a spa centre."

== Gallery ==
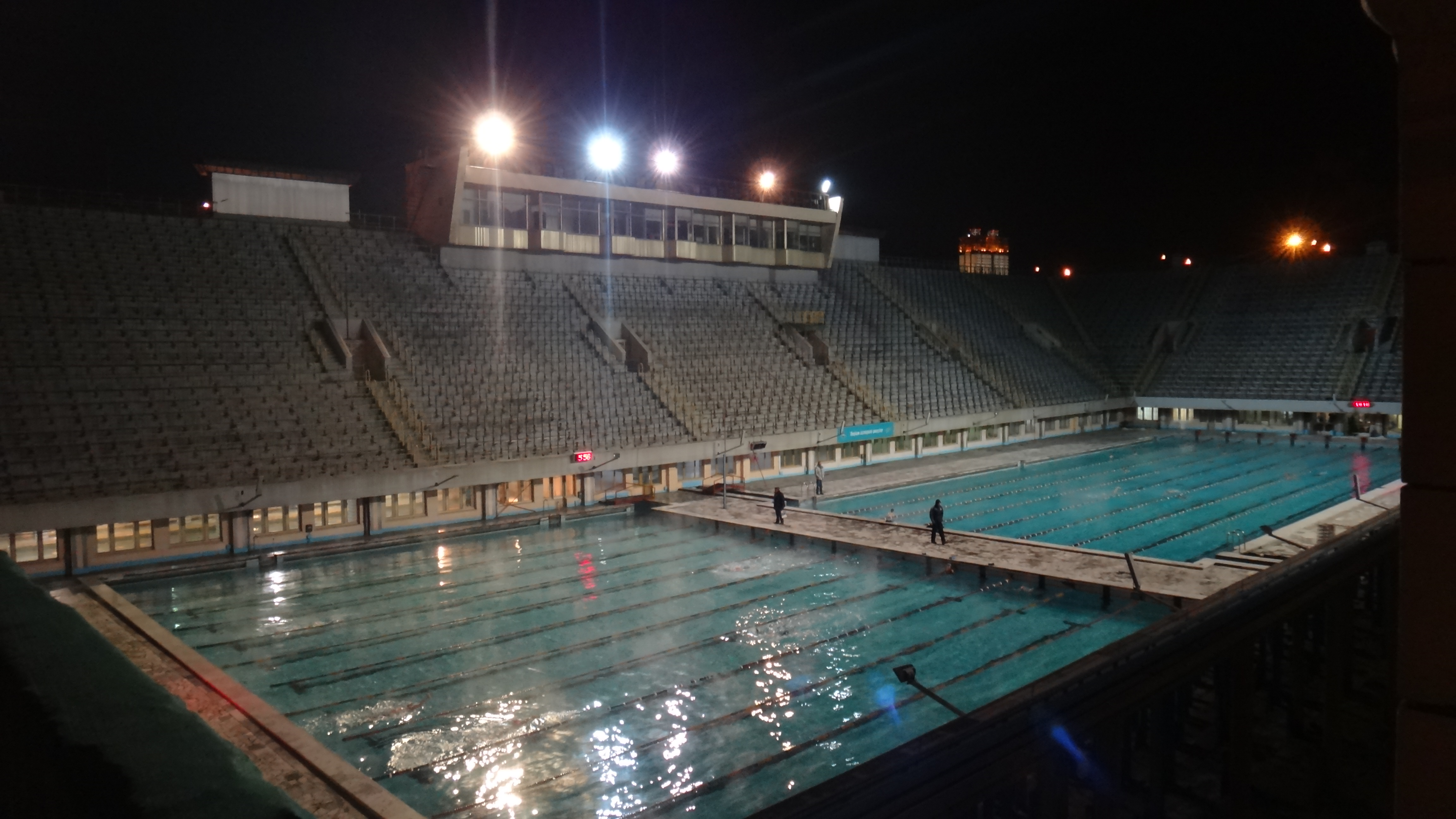
Night view of the pool

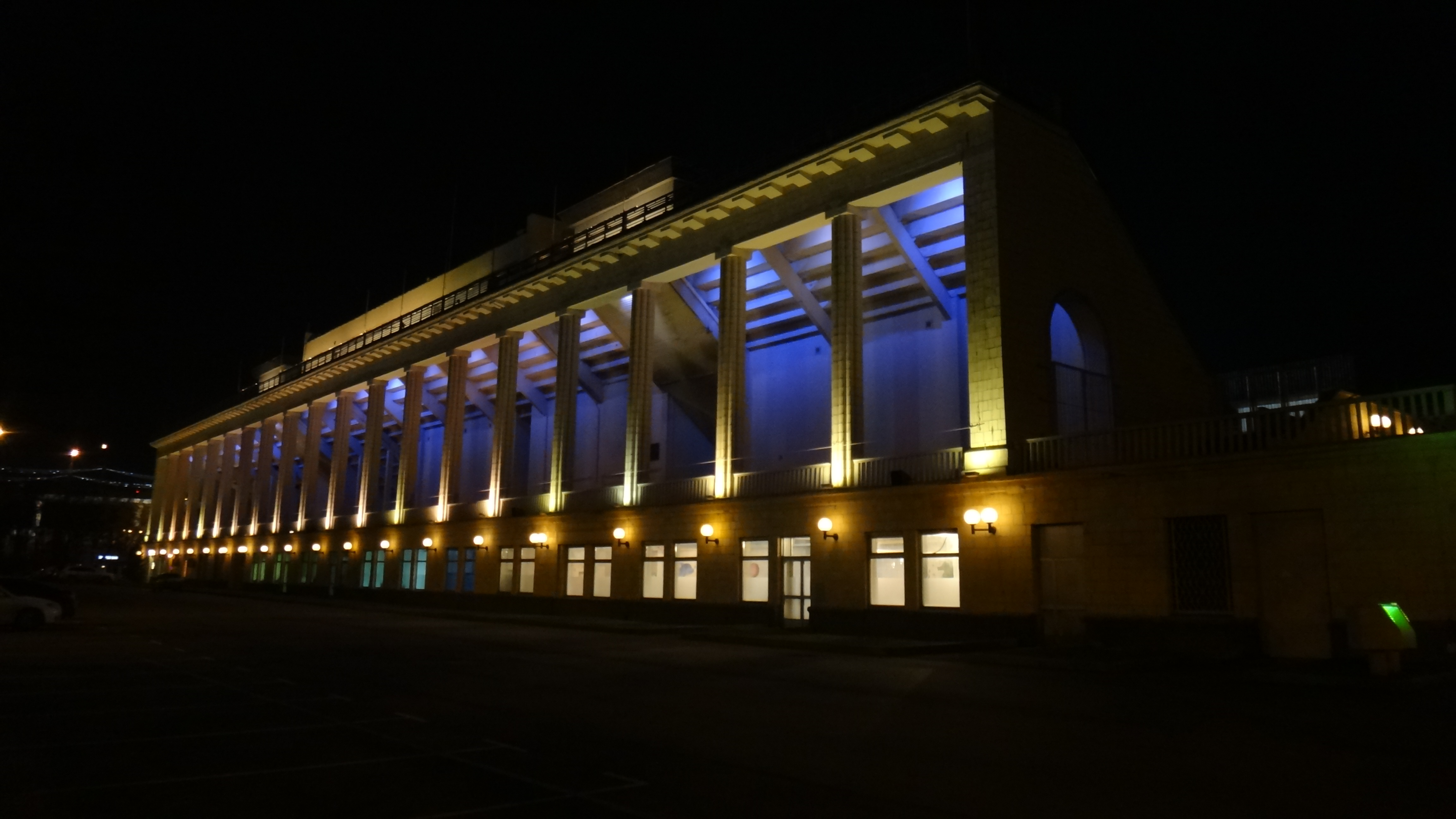
Outside the pool at night

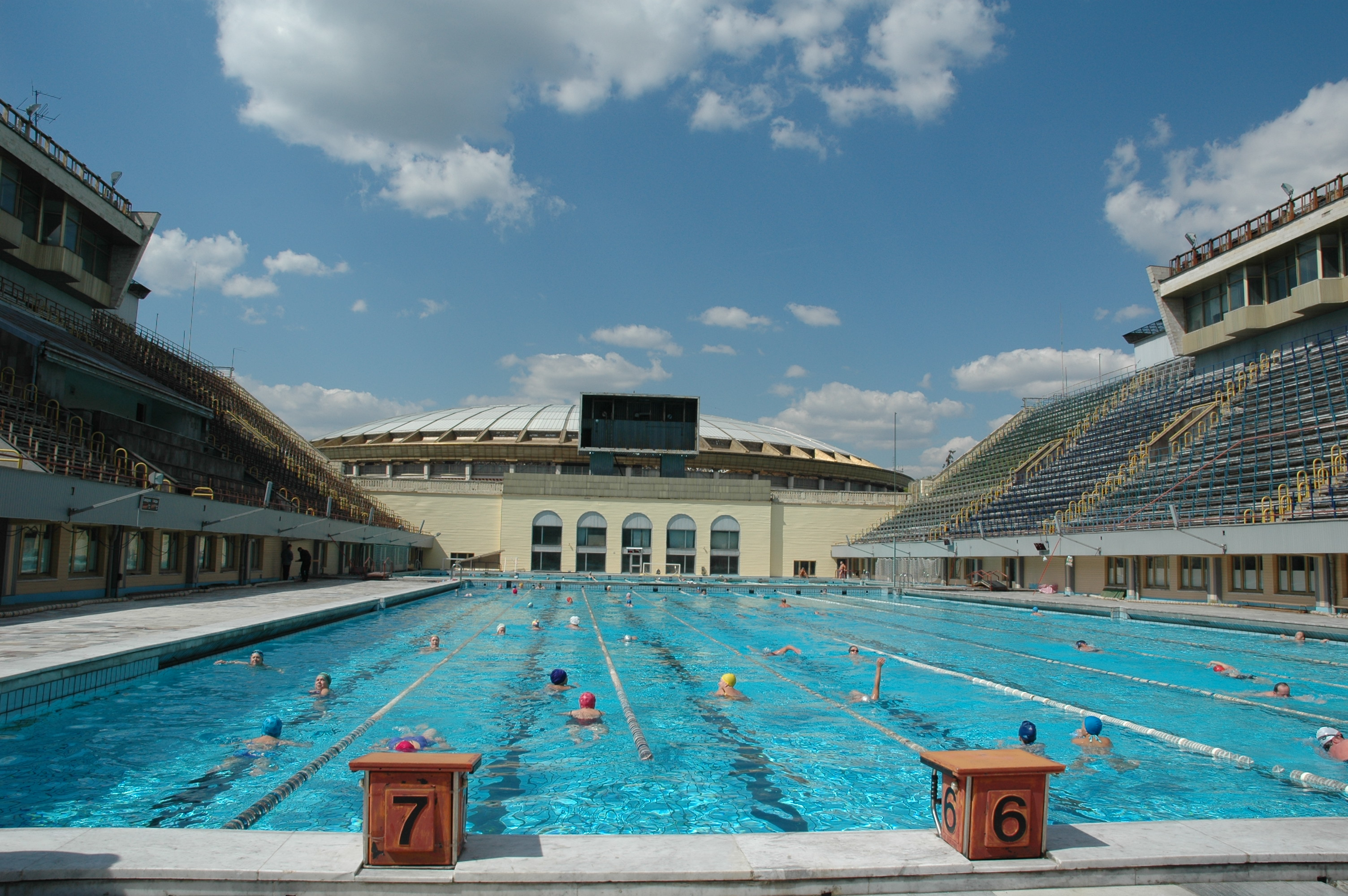
The pool in 2006

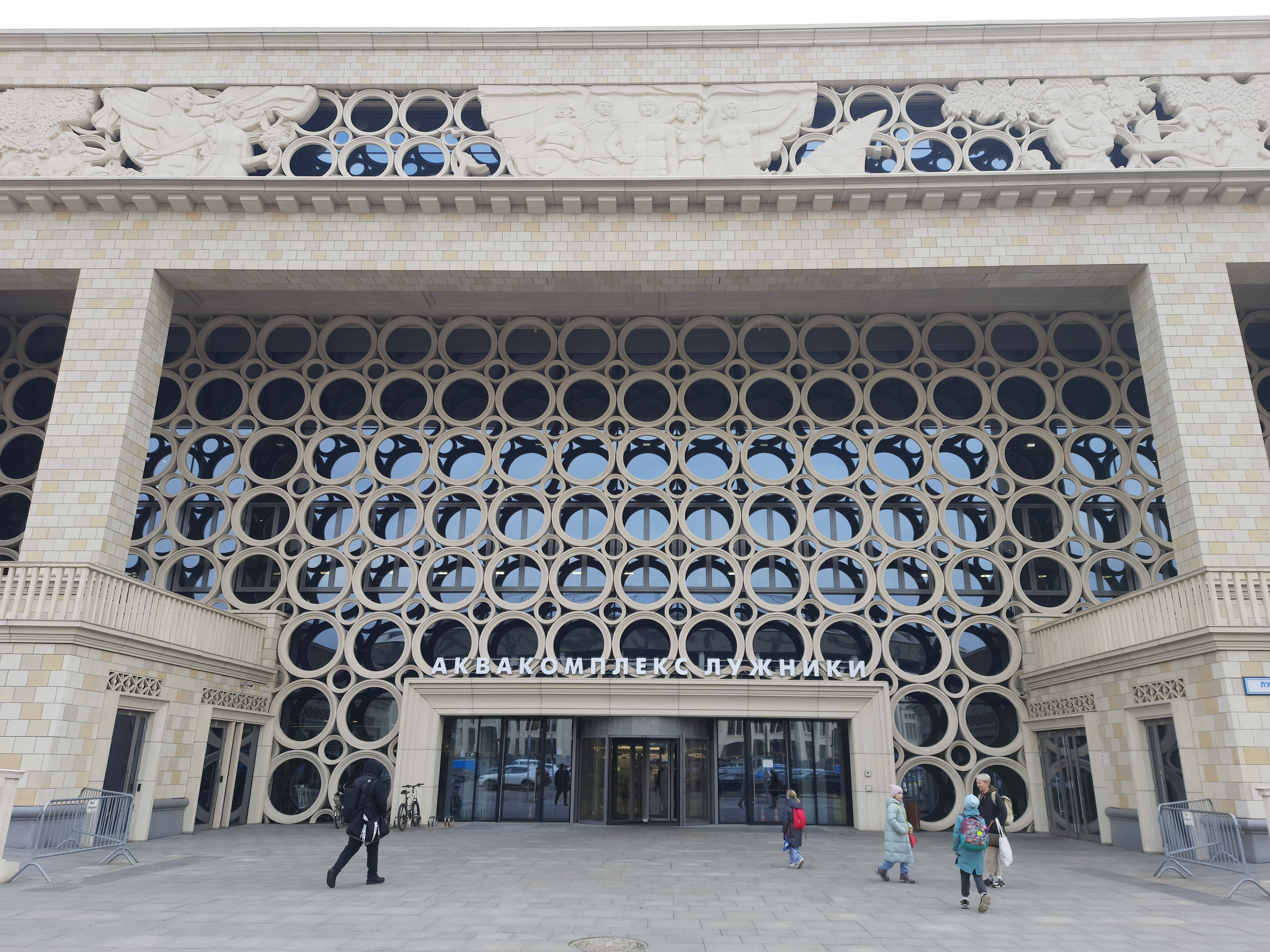
Entrance to the pool

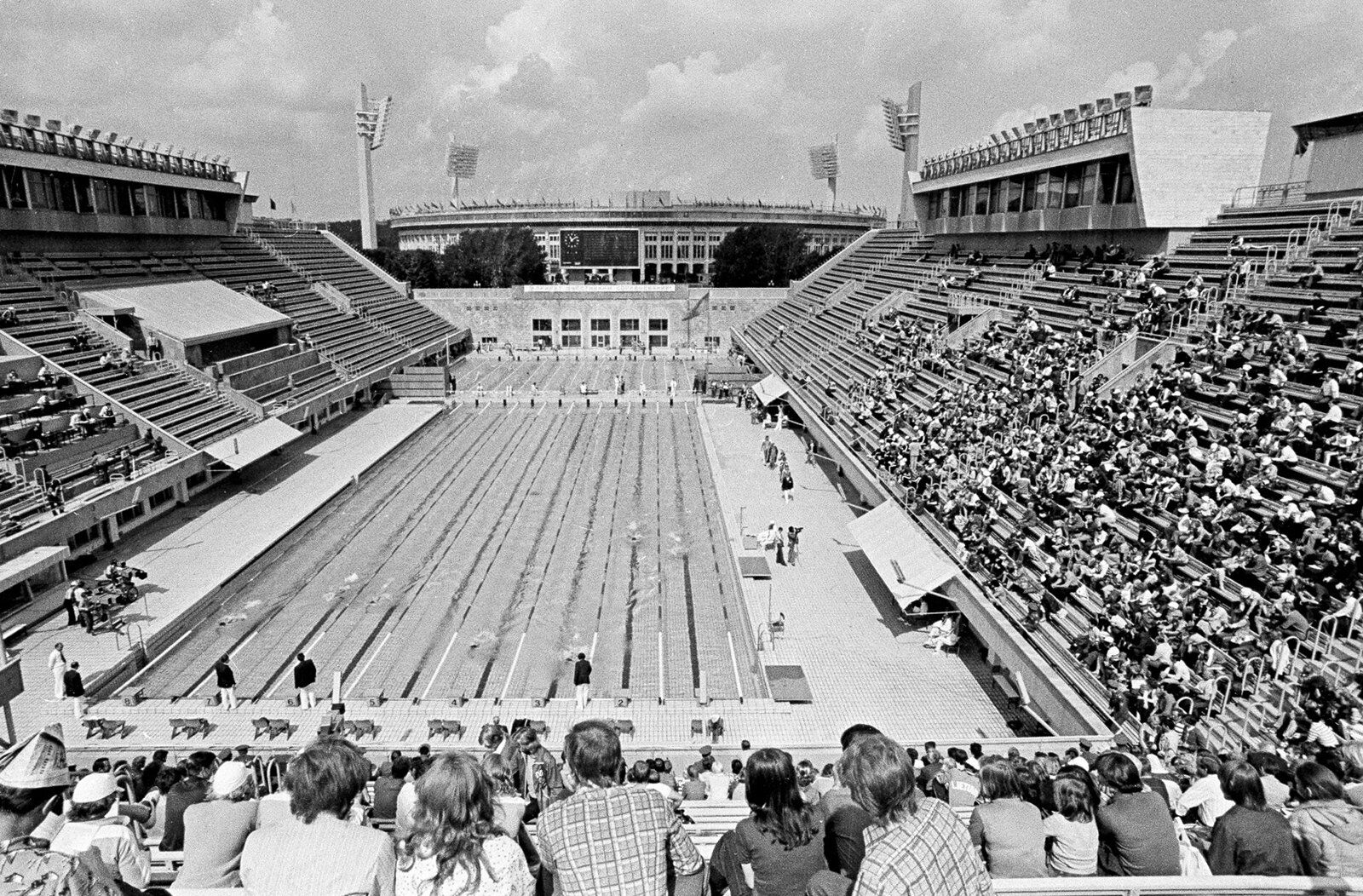
The pool in 1979

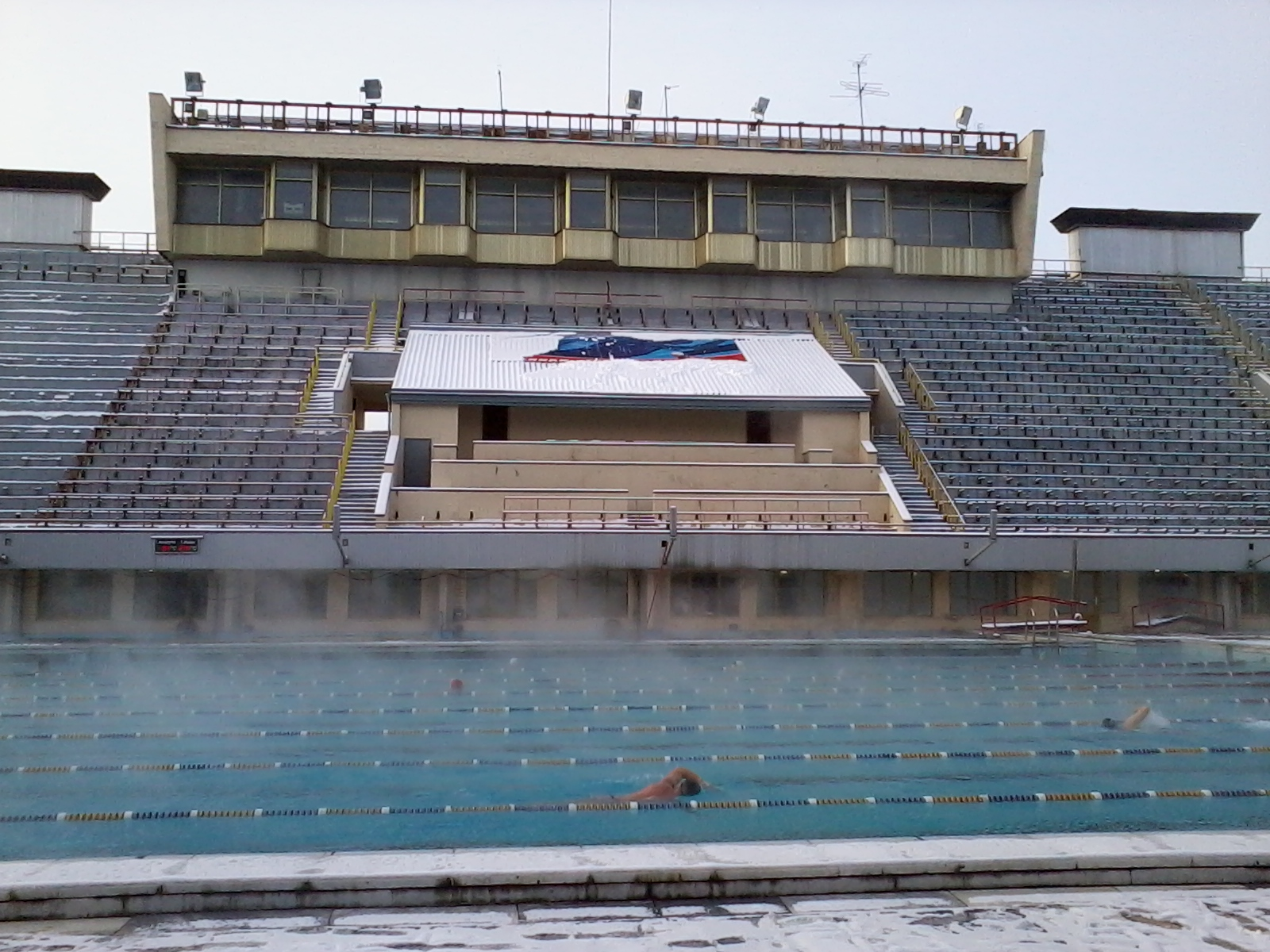
View of the stands
