= Arne Claesson =

Swedish water polo player

Personal information
- Nationality: Swedish
- Born: 5 April 1957 (age 67); Stockholm, Sweden

Sport
- Sport: Water polo

Arne Claesson (born 5 April 1957) is a Swedish water polo player. He competed in the men's tournament at the 1980 Summer Olympics.
