= Vasile Ungureanu =

Romanian water polo player

Personal information
- Nationality: Romanian
- Born: 4 March 1957 (age 68)

Sport
- Sport: Water polo

Vasile Ungureanu (born 4 March 1957) is a Romanian water polo player. He competed in the men's tournament at the 1980 Summer Olympics.
