= Christer Stenberg =

Swedish water polo player

Personal information
- Nationality: Swedish
- Born: 20 December 1956 (age 68); Stockholm, Sweden

Sport
- Sport: Water polo

Christer Stenberg (born 20 December 1956) is a Swedish water polo player. He competed in the men's tournament at the 1980 Summer Olympics.
