= Jorge Alonso (water polo) =

Spanish water polo player (born 1958)

Personal information
- Born: 26 July 1958 (age 67) Barcelona, Spain

Sport
- Sport: Water polo
Medal record
Representing Spain
Mediterranean Games
| Bronze medal – third place | 1979 Split | Team competition |

Jorge Alonso (born 26 July 1958) is a Spanish water polo player. He competed in the men's tournament at the 1980 Summer Olympics.
