= Peter Carlström =

Swedish water polo player

Personal information
- Full name: Gunnar Peter Carlström
- Nationality: Swedish
- Born: 24 May 1956 (age 68); Västerås, Sweden

Sport
- Sport: Water polo

Gunnar Peter Carlström (born 24 May 1956) is a Swedish water polo player. He competed in the men's tournament at the 1980 Summer Olympics.

At club level, Carlström represented Västerås SS.
