= Viorel Costraș =

Romanian water polo player

Personal information
- Nationality: Romanian
- Born: 19 June 1959 (age 67) Oradea, Romania

Sport
- Sport: Water polo
Medal record
Representing Romania
Summer Universiade
Bronze medal – third place	1981 Bucharest	Team competition

Viorel Costraș (born 19 June 1959) is a Romanian water polo player. He competed in the men's tournament at the 1980 Summer Olympics.
