= Jorge Carmona =

Spanish water polo player (born 1958)

Personal information
- Nationality: Spanish
- Born: 10 May 1958 (age 68) Barcelona, Spain

Sport
- Sport: Water polo
Medal record
Representing Spain
European Championships
Bronze medal – third place	1983 Rome	Team competition
Mediterranean Games
Silver medal – second place	1983 Casablanca	Team competition
Bronze medal – third place	1979 Split	Team competition

Jorge Carmona (born 10 May 1958) is a Spanish water polo player. He competed at the 1980 Summer Olympics and the 1984 Summer Olympics.
