= Per-Arne Andersson =

Swedish water polo player

Personal information
- Full name: Per-Arne Andersson
- Nationality: Swedish
- Born: 15 July 1958 (age 66); Västerås, Sweden

Sport
- Sport: Water polo

Per-Arne Andersson (born 15 July 1958) is a Swedish water polo player. He competed in the men's tournament at the 1980 Summer Olympics.

At club level, Andersson represented Västerås SS.
