= Georgi Gospodinov (water polo) =

Bulgarian water polo player (born 1958)

Personal information
- Nationality: Bulgarian
- Born: 20 December 1958 (age 66)

Sport
- Sport: Water polo

Georgi Gospodinov (Bulgarian: Георги Господинов, born 20 December 1958) is a Bulgarian water polo player. He competed in the men's tournament at the 1980 Summer Olympics.
