= Matey Popov =

Bulgarian water polo player (born 1951)

Personal information
- Nationality: Bulgarian
- Born: 30 April 1951 (age 74); Sofia, Bulgaria

Sport
- Sport: Water polo

Matey Popov (Bulgarian: Матей Попов; born 30 April 1951) is a Bulgarian water polo player. He competed at the 1972 Summer Olympics and the 1980 Summer Olympics.
