= László Kuncz =

Hungarian water polo player (1957–2020)

Personal information
- Born: 29 July 1957
- Died: 6 December 2020 (aged 63)

Sport
- Sport: Water polo
Medal record
Representing Hungary
Olympic Games
Bronze medal – third place	1980 Moscow	Team competition
World Championships
Silver medal – second place	1982 Guayaquil	Team competition
European Championships
Bronze medal – third place	1981 Split	Team competition

László Kuncz (29 July 1957 – 6 December 2020) was a Hungarian water polo player who competed in the 1980 Summer Olympics, winning a bronze medal.

== See also ==
- List of Olympic medalists in water polo (men)
- List of World Aquatics Championships medalists in water polo
