= Antoni Partalev =

Bulgarian water polo player (born 1958)

Personal information
- Nationality: Bulgarian
- Born: May 19, 1958
- Died: April , 2004

Sport
- Sport: Water polo

Antoni Partalev (born 19 May 1958) was a Bulgarian water polo player. He competed in the men's tournament at the 1980 Summer Olympics.
