= Sergey Kotenko =

Kazakhstani water polo player

Personal information
- Born: 2 December 1956 (age 69) Alma-Ata, Kazakh SSR, Soviet Union

Sport
- Sport: Water polo
Medal record
Representing the Soviet Union
Olympic Games
Gold medal – first place	1980 Moscow	Team competition
Bronze medal – third place	1988 Seoul	Team competition
World Championships
Gold medal – first place	1982 Guayaquil	Team competition
Bronze medal – third place	1986 Madrid	Team competition
European Championships
Gold medal – first place	1983 Rome	Team competition
Gold medal – first place	1985 Sofia	Team competition
Gold medal – first place	1987 Strasbourg	Team competition
Silver medal – second place	1981 Split	Team competition

Sergey Vladimirovich Kotenko (born 2 December 1956) is a Kazakhstani former water polo player who competed in the 1976 Summer Olympics, in the 1980 Summer Olympics, and in the 1988 Summer Olympics.

== See also ==
- Soviet Union men's Olympic water polo team records and statistics
- List of Olympic champions in men's water polo
- List of Olympic medalists in water polo (men)
- List of world champions in men's water polo
- List of World Aquatics Championships medalists in water polo
