= Viorel Rus =

Romanian water polo player

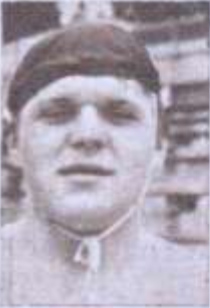
- Rus in 1972

Personal information
- Nationality: Romanian
- Born: 14 November 1952 (age 73) Cluj-Napoca, Romania

Sport
- Sport: Water polo

Viorel Rus (born 14 November 1952) is a Romanian water polo player. He competed at the 1972 Summer Olympics, the 1976 Summer Olympics and the 1980 Summer Olympics.

== See also ==
- Romania men's Olympic water polo team records and statistics
