= Jan Evert Veer =

Dutch water polo player (born 1950)

Personal information
- Born: November 1, 1950 (age 75) The Hague, Netherlands

Sport
- Sport: Water polo
Medal record
Representing Netherlands
Olympic Games
Bronze medal – third place	1976 Montreal	Team competition

Jan Evert Veer (born 1 November 1950) is a former water polo player from the Netherlands. He participated in three Summer Olympics, starting in 1972 in Munich. After the seventh place in West Germany, four years later the Dutch won the bronze medal at the 1976 Summer Olympics in Montreal. In 1980 Veer finished in sixth position with the Holland squad.

Veer has been coaching TW Zaanstreek after his playing career.

== See also ==
- List of Olympic medalists in water polo (men)
