= Carlos Benítez (water polo) =

Cuban water polo player (born 1955)

Personal information
- Nationality: Cuban
- Born: 8 October 1955 (age 69)

Sport
- Sport: Water polo

Carlos Benítez (born 8 October 1955) is a Cuban water polo player. He competed in the men's tournament at the 1980 Summer Olympics.
