= Robert Bryant (water polo) =

Australian water polo player

Personal information
- Born: June 14, 1958 (age 66)

Sport
- Sport: Water polo

Robert Bryant (born 14 June 1958) is an Australian former water polo player who competed in the 1980 Summer Olympics and in the 1984 Summer Olympics.
