= Mikhail Ivanov (water polo) =

Russian water polo player

Personal information
- Born: 18 April 1958 (age 68) Moscow, Soviet Union

Sport
- Sport: Water polo
Medal record
Representing the Soviet Union
Water polo
Gold medal – first place	1980 Moscow	Team competition
Bronze medal – third place	1988 Seoul	Team competition
World Championships
Gold medal – first place	1982 Guayaquil	Team competition
Bronze medal – third place	1986 Madrid	Team competition
European Championships
Gold medal – first place	1983 Rome	Team competition
Gold medal – first place	1985 Sofia	Team competition
Silver medal – second place	1981 Split	Team competition

Mikhail Ivanov (born 18 April 1958) is a Russian former water polo player who competed in the 1980 Summer Olympics and in the 1988 Summer Olympics.

== See also ==
- Soviet Union men's Olympic water polo team records and statistics
- List of Olympic champions in men's water polo
- List of Olympic medalists in water polo (men)
- List of world champions in men's water polo
- List of World Aquatics Championships medalists in water polo
