= Giorgi Mshvenieradze =

Soviet water polo player

Personal information
- Born: 12 August 1960 (age 65) Tbilisi, Georgian SSR, Soviet Union

Sport
- Sport: Water polo
Medal record
Representing the Soviet Union
Olympic Games
Gold medal – first place	1980 Moscow	Team competition
Bronze medal – third place	1988 Seoul	Team competition
World Championships
Gold medal – first place	1982 Guayaquil	Team competition
Bronze medal – third place	1986 Madrid	Team competition
European Championships
Gold medal – first place	1983 Rome	Team competition
Gold medal – first place	1985 Sofia	Team competition
Gold medal – first place	1987 Strasbourg	Team competition
Summer Universiade
Gold medal – first place	1985 Kobe	Team competition

Georgi Mshvenieradze (Georgian: გიორგი მშვენიერაძე; born 12 August 1960) is a former Soviet water polo player. His father, Petre, was the captain of the USSR team throughout the 1950s and appeared at three Olympic Games. Georgy and his brother Nugzari followed their father into the sport.

== See also ==
- Soviet Union men's Olympic water polo team records and statistics
- List of Olympic champions in men's water polo
- List of Olympic medalists in water polo (men)
- List of world champions in men's water polo
- List of World Aquatics Championships medalists in water polo
