= Tamás Faragó =

Hungarian water polo player

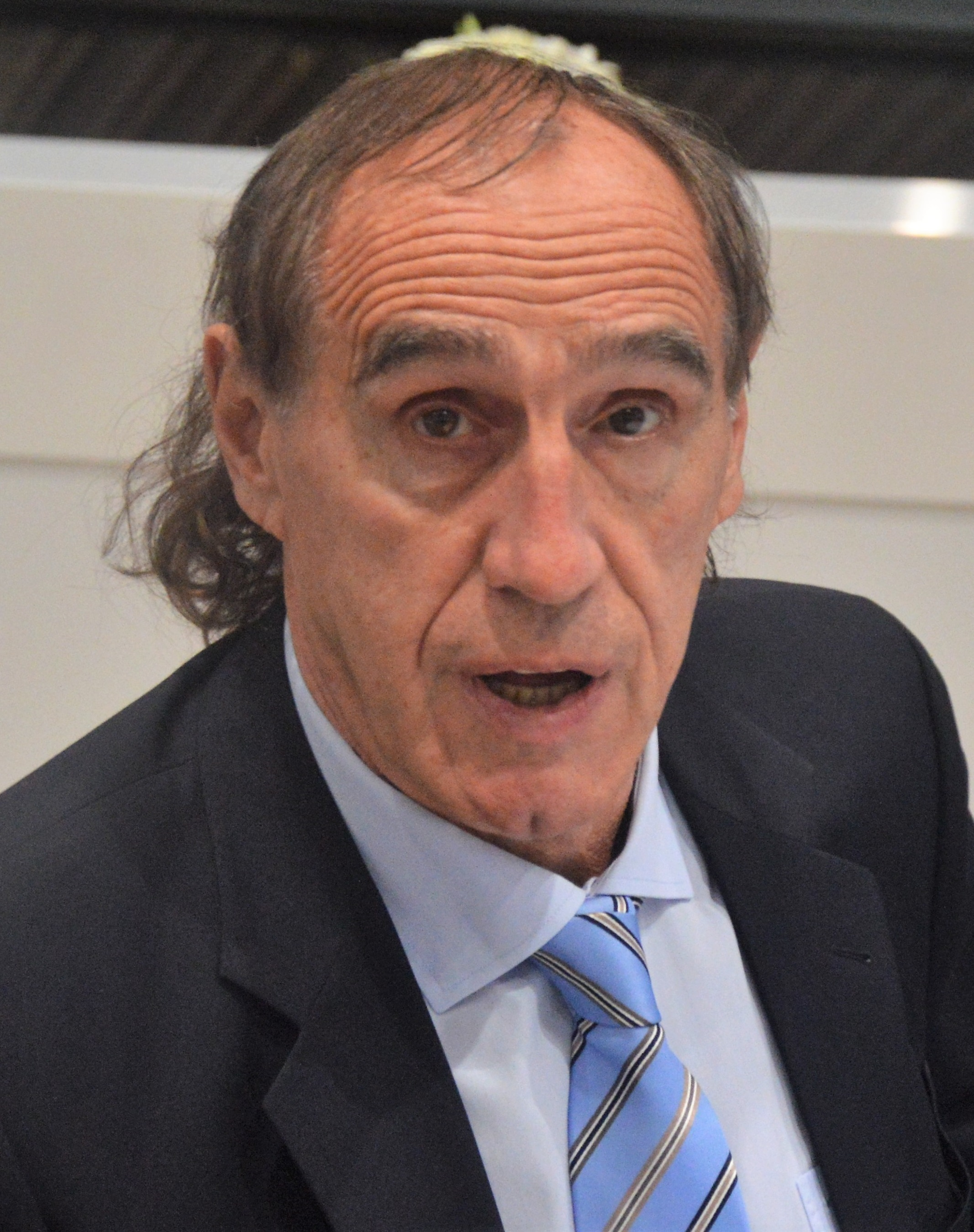
- Faragó in 2014

Personal information
- Born: 5 August 1952 (age 73) Budapest, Hungary
- Height: 194 cm (6 ft 4 in)
- Weight: 95 kg (209 lb)

Sport
- Sport: Water polo
- Club: Vasas SC
Medal record
Representing Hungary
Olympic Games
Gold medal – first place	1976 Montréal	Team
Silver medal – second place	1972 Munich	Team
Bronze medal – third place	1980 Moscow	Team
World Championships
Gold medal – first place	1973 Belgrade	Team
Silver medal – second place	1975 Cali	Team
Silver medal – second place	1978 Berlin	Team
European Championships
Gold medal – first place	1974 Vienna	Team
Gold medal – first place	1977 Jönköping	Team

Tamás Faragó (born 5 August 1952) is a former Hungarian water polo player. He competed in all major international tournaments between 1970 and 1980 and won three medals at the Summer Olympics and five at the world and European championships. He was the top goalscorer at the 1976 Olympics, with 22 goals. After retiring from competitions he became a water polo coach, guiding Hungary's junior and women's national teams. In 1993 he was inducted into the International Swimming Hall of Fame, and in 2005 he was voted the Hungarian coach of the year.

== See also ==
- Hungary men's Olympic water polo team records and statistics
- List of Olympic champions in men's water polo
- List of Olympic medalists in water polo (men)
- List of men's Olympic water polo tournament top goalscorers
- List of world champions in men's water polo
- List of world champions in women's water polo
- List of World Aquatics Championships medalists in water polo
- List of members of the International Swimming Hall of Fame
