= Kiril Kiryakov =

Bulgarian water polo player (born 1953)

Personal information
- Nationality: Bulgarian
- Born: 13 October 1953 (age 71)

Sport
- Sport: Water polo

Kiril Kiryakov (Bulgarian: Кирил Киряков, born 13 October 1953) is a Bulgarian water polo player. He competed in the men's tournament at the 1980 Summer Olympics.
