= Arturo Ramos =

Cuban water polo player (born 1960)

Personal information
- Nationality: Cuban
- Born: 13 October 1960 (age 64)

Sport
- Sport: Water polo

Arturo Ramos (born 13 October 1960) is a Cuban water polo player. He competed in the men's tournament at the 1980 Summer Olympics.
