= Michael Udvardi =

American plant biologist

- Education: The Australian National University
- Scientific career
- Fields: Botany

Michael Udvardi is an Australian plant biologist currently the chief scientific officer at the Noble Research Institute and an elected fellow of the American Association for the Advancement of Science since 2012. A highly cited expert in the last half-decade, his current interests are symbiosis and crops relationships.

== Education ==
He graduated with a Ph.D. degree from Australian National University in 1989.

== Publications ==
- Genome-wide identification and testing of superior reference genes for transcript normalization in Arabidopsis, Plant physiology, 2005
- Genome-Wide Reprogramming of Primary and Secondary Metabolism, Protein Synthesis, Cellular Growth Processes, and the Regulatory Infrastructure of Arabidopsis in Response to Nitrogen, Plant physiology, 2004
- The Medicago genome provides insight into the evolution of rhizobial symbioses, Nature, 2011
- Real‐time RT‐PCR profiling of over 1400 Arabidopsis transcription factors: unprecedented sensitivity reveals novel root‐and shoot‐specific genes, The Plant Journal, 2004
