= István Udvardi =

Hungarian water polo player

Personal information
- Born: February 27, 1960 Budapest, Hungary
- Died: February 6, 2012 (aged 51) Kecskemét, Hungary

Sport
- Sport: Water polo
Medal record
Representing Hungary
Olympic Games
Bronze medal – third place	1980 Moscow	Team competition
European Championships
Bronze medal – third place	1981 Split	Team competition

István Udvardi (27 February 1960 – 6 February 2012) was a Hungarian water polo player. He competed at the 1980 Summer Olympics.

== See also ==
- List of Olympic medalists in water polo (men)
