= István Kiss (water polo) =

Hungarian water polo player

Personal information
- Born: July 25, 1958 (age 67) Budapest

Sport
- Sport: Water polo
Medal record
Representing Hungary
Olympic Games
Bronze medal – third place	1980 Moscow	Team competition
World Championships
Silver medal – second place	1982 Guayaquil	Team competition
European Championships
Bronze medal – third place	1981 Split	Team competition

István Kiss (born 25 July 1958) is a Hungarian former water polo player who competed in the 1980 Summer Olympics.

== See also ==
- List of Olympic medalists in water polo (men)
- List of World Aquatics Championships medalists in water polo
