= Erkin Shagaev =

Uzbekistani water polo player (born 1959)

Personal information
- Born: 12 February 1959 (age 67) Tashkent, Soviet Union

Sport
- Sport: Water polo
Medal record
Representing the Soviet Union
Olympic Games
Gold medal – first place	1980 Moscow	Team competition
World Championships
Gold medal – first place	1982 Guayaquil	Team competition
European Championships
Gold medal – first place	1983 Rome	Team competition
Silver medal – second place	1981 Split	Team competition

Erkin Maksudovich Shagayev (Russian: Эркин Максудович Шагаев, born 12 February 1959) was an Uzbekistani water polo player who was the part of the Soviet water polo team which won the gold medal in the 1980 Summer Olympics in Moscow. He was born in Tashkent and played for the Mekhnat club there.

== See also ==
- Soviet Union men's Olympic water polo team records and statistics
- List of Olympic champions in men's water polo
- List of Olympic medalists in water polo (men)
- List of world champions in men's water polo
- List of World Aquatics Championships medalists in water polo
