= Biser Georgiev (water polo) =

Bulgarian water polo player (born 1953)

Personal information
- Nationality: Bulgarian
- Born: 18 March 1953 (age 72)

Sport
- Sport: Water polo

Biser Georgiev (Bulgarian: Бисер Георгиев; born 18 March 1953) is a Bulgarian water polo player. He competed in the men's tournament at the 1980 Summer Olympics.
