= Adrian Nastasiu =

Romanian water polo player

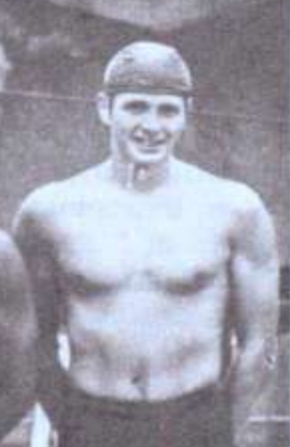
- Nastasiu in 1970

Personal information
- Nationality: Romanian
- Born: 10 October 1951 (age 74) Bucharest, Romania

Sport
- Sport: Water polo

Adrian Nastasiu (born 10 October 1951) is a Romanian water polo player. He competed at the 1976 Summer Olympics and the 1980 Summer Olympics.
