= Oriel Domínguez =

Cuban water polo player (born 1953)

Personal information
- Nationality: Cuban
- Born: 4 July 1953 (age 71)

Sport
- Sport: Water polo

Oriel Domínguez (born 4 July 1953) is a Cuban water polo player. He competed at the 1976 Summer Olympics and the 1980 Summer Olympics.
