= Jorge Rizo =

Cuban water polo player (born 1952)

Personal information
- Nationality: Cuban
- Born: 21 September 1952 (age 73)

Sport
- Sport: Water polo

Jorge Rizo Pereda (born 21 September 1952) is a Cuban water polo player. He competed at the 1972 Summer Olympics, the 1976 Summer Olympics and the 1980 Summer Olympics.

== Results ==
=== Summer Olympics ===
- 1972 Summer Olympics (Munich): 5th
- 1976 Summer Olympics (Montreal): 7th
- 1980 Summer Olympics (Moscow): 9th

=== Pan-American Games ===
- 1971 Pan American Games: Silver medalist
- 1975 Pan American Games: Bronze medalist
- 1979 Pan American Games: Silver medalist
- 1983 Pan American Games: Silver medalist
