= Lazaro Costa =

Cuban water polo player (born 1957)

Personal information
- Born: 27 March 1957 (age 68); Havana, Cuba

Sport
- Sport: Water polo

Lazaro Costa (born 27 March 1957) is a Cuban water polo player. He competed at the 1976 Summer Olympics and the 1980 Summer Olympics.
