= Bárbaro Díaz =

Cuban water polo player (born 1960)

Personal information
- Nationality: Cuban
- Born: 28 August 1960 (age 64)

Sport
- Sport: Water polo

Bárbaro Díaz (born 28 August 1960) is a Cuban water polo player. He competed at the 1980 Summer Olympics and the 1992 Summer Olympics.

Díaz moved to Brazil in 1994, where he became a coach; he coached the Brazil men's national water polo team at the 2007 Pan American Games.
