= Gerardo Rodríguez (water polo) =

Cuban water polo player (born 1954)

Personal information
- Born: 6 June 1954 (age 70); Havana, Cuba

Sport
- Sport: Water polo

Gerardo Rodríguez (born 6 June 1954) is a Cuban water polo player. He competed at the 1972 Summer Olympics, the 1976 Summer Olympics and the 1980 Summer Olympics.
