= David Neesham =

Australian water polo player

Personal information
- Born: September 18, 1946 (age 78); East Fremantle, Australia

Sport
- Sport: Water polo

David Neesham (born 18 September 1946) is an Australian former water polo player who competed in the 1972 Summer Olympics, in the 1976 Summer Olympics, and in the 1980 Summer Olympics. In 2010, he was inducted into the Water Polo Australia Hall of Fame.
