= Donji Orahovac, Kotor =

Donji Orahovac Доњи Ораховац
- Village
- Location within Montenegro
- Coordinates: 42.490454°N 18.759290°E
- Country: Montenegro
- Region: Coastal
- Municipality: Kotor

Population (2011)
  - Total: 298
- Time zone: UTC+1 (CET)
  - Summer (DST): UTC+2 (CEST)

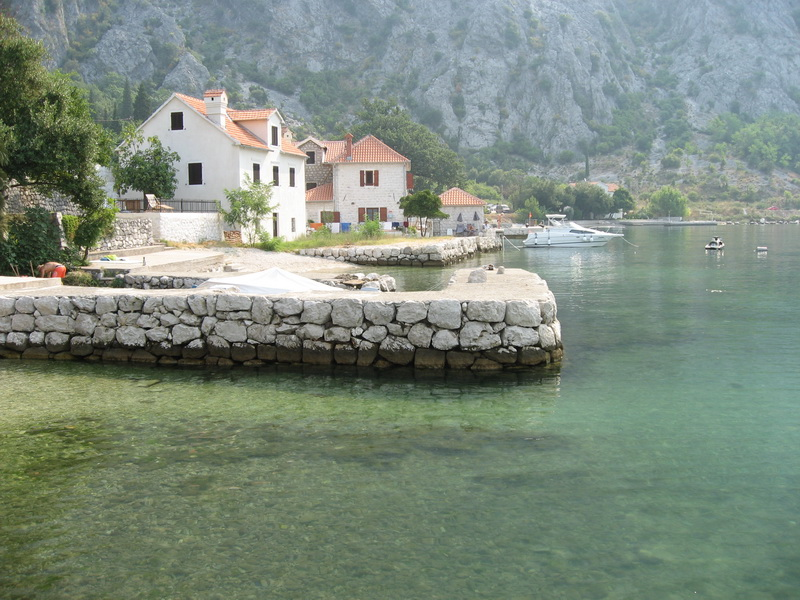
Orahovac

Donji Orahovac (Montenegrin: Доњи Ораховац) is a village in the municipality of Kotor, in southwestern Montenegro. The village is the located on the Bay of Kotor.

== Demographics ==
According to the 2011 census, its population was 298.

Ethnicity in 2011
Ethnicity	Number	Percentage
Serbs	142	47.7%
Montenegrins	119	39.9%
Croats	11	3.7%
other/undeclared	26	8.7%
Total	298	100%
