= Nelson Domínguez =

Cuban water polo player (born 1957)

Personal information
- Nationality: Cuban
- Born: 23 December 1957 (age 67)

Sport
- Sport: Water polo

Nelson Domínguez (born 23 December 1957) is a Cuban water polo player. He competed at the 1976 Summer Olympics and the 1980 Summer Olympics.
