= Water polo at the 1979 Mediterranean Games =

- Dates: 24 – 29 September 1979

Water polo was one of several sports at the 1979 Mediterranean Games. The 8th Mediterranean Games was held in Split, Yugoslavia. Only men's teams participated in the water polo tournament.

== Medalists ==
Event	Gold	Silver	Bronze
Men's Competition	Yugoslavia	Italy	Spain

== Teams ==
GROUP A

- Egypt
- Italy
- Spain
- Turkey

GROUP B

- Greece
- Malta
- Yugoslavia

== Preliminary round ==
=== Group A ===
	Team	Points	G	W	D	L	GF	GA	Diff
1.	Italy	6	3	3	0	0	31	9	+22
2.	Spain	4	3	2	0	1	37	15	+22
3.	Turkey	2	3	1	0	2	17	35	–18
4.	Egypt	0	3	0	0	3	7	33	–26

- September 24, 1979

Turkey	7 – 18	Spain
Italy	12 – 1	Egypt

- September 25, 1979

Spain	5 – 7	Italy
Turkey	7 – 5	Egypt

- September 26, 1979

Italy	12 – 3	Turkey
Spain	14 – 1	Egypt

=== Group B ===
	Team	Points	G	W	D	L	GF	GA	Diff
1.	Yugoslavia	4	2	2	0	0	23	5	+18
2.	Greece	1	2	0	1	1	9	13	–4
3.	Malta	1	2	0	1	1	6	20	–14

- September 24, 1979

Malta	5 – 5	Greece

- September 25, 1979

Yugoslavia	8 – 4	Greece

- September 26, 1979

Yugoslavia	15 – 1	Malta

== Final round ==
Semi-finals
Italy	14
Greece	4
Yugoslavia	6
Spain	5

Final
Yugoslavia	7
Italy	4
Third place
Spain	11
Greece	0

=== Semi finals ===
- September 27, 1979

Italy	14 – 4	Greece
Yugoslavia	6 – 5	Spain

=== Classification matches ===
- September 27, 1979

Malta	4 – 4	Egypt

- September 29, 1979

Turkey	7 – 3	Malta

=== Finals ===
- September 29, 1979 — Bronze Medal Match

Spain	11 – 0	Greece

- September 29, 1979 — Gold Medal Match

Yugoslavia	7 – 4	Italy

== Standings ==
Rank	Team
1st place, gold medalist(s)	Yugoslavia
2nd place, silver medalist(s)	Italy
3rd place, bronze medalist(s)	Spain
4	Greece
5	Turkey
6	Egypt
7	Malta
