= Italy at the 1976 Summer Olympics =

- IOC code: ITA
- NOC: Italian National Olympic Committee

in Montreal
- Competitors: 210 (183 men, 27 women) in 20 sports
- Flag bearer: Klaus Dibiasi
- Medals Ranked 14th: Gold 2 Silver 7 Bronze 4 Total 13

Summer Olympics appearances (overview)
- 1896; 1900; 1904; 1908; 1912; 1920; 1924; 1928; 1932; 1936; 1948; 1952; 1956; 1960; 1964; 1968; 1972; 1976; 1980; 1984; 1988; 1992; 1996; 2000; 2004; 2008; 2012; 2016; 2020; 2024; 2028

Other related appearances
- 1906 Intercalated Games

Italy competed at the 1976 Summer Olympics in Montreal, Quebec, Canada. 210 competitors, 183 men and 27 women, took part in 122 events in 20 sports.

== Medalists ==
=== Gold ===
- Klaus Dibiasi — Diving, Men's Platform
- Fabio Dal Zotto — Fencing, Men's Foil Individual Competition

=== Silver ===
- Sara Simeoni — Athletics, Women's High Jump
- Giuseppe Martinelli — Cycling, Men's Individual Road Race
- Giorgio Cagnotto — Diving, Men's Springboard
- Maria Consolata Collino — Fencing, Women's Foil Individual Competition
- Fabio Dal Zotto, Giambattista Coletti, Attilio Calatroni, Stefano Simoncelli, and Carlo Montano — Fencing, Men's Foil Team Competition
- Mario Tullio Montano, Tommaso Montano, Angelo Arcidiacono, Michele Maffei, and Mario Aldo Montano — Fencing, Men's Sabre Team Competition
- Umberto Panerai, Roldano Simeoni, Riccardo De Magistris, Alessandro Ghibellini, Sante Marsili, Vincenzo D'Angelo, Marcello Del Duca, Gianni De Magistris, Alberto Alberani, Silvio Baracchini, and Luigi Castagnola — Water Polo, Men's Team Competition

=== Bronze ===
- Giancarlo Ferrari — Archery, Men's Individual Competition
- Felice Mariani — Judo, Men's Lightweight (63 kg)
- Roberto Ferraris — Shooting, Men's Rapid-Fire Pistol
- Ubaldesco Baldi — Shooting, Men's Trap Shooting

== Archery ==
Competing for the second time in archery at the Olympics, Italy won its first medal (a bronze) in the sport. The medal was won by Giancarlo Ferrari, one of two Italian men who had competed four years before. Sante Spigarelli, the other, also improved his rank drastically in 1976. For the first time, Italian women competed in Olympic archery, taking 12th and 19th place.

Women's Individual Competition

- Franca Capetta — 2339 points (→ 12th place)
- Ida Da Poian — 2282 points (→ 19th place)

Men's Individual Competition

- Giancarlo Ferrari — 2495 points (→ Bronze Medal)
- Sante Spigarelli — 2419 points (→ 10th place)

== Athletics ==
Men's 800 metres

- Carlo Grippo

- Heat — 1:47.21
- Semi Final — 1:46.95
- Final — 1:48.39 (→ 8th place)

Men's 5.000 metres

- Venanzio Ortis

- Heat — 13:52.40 (→ did not advance)

Men's 4×100 metres Relay

- Vincenzo Guerini, Luciano Caravani, Luigi Benedetti, and Pietro Mennea

- Heat — 39.35s
- Semi Final — 39.39s
- Final — 39.08s (→ 6th place)

Men's Marathon

- Francesco Fava — 2:14:24 (→ 8th place)
- Massimo Magnani — 2:16:56 (→ 13th place)
- Giuseppe Cindolo — did not finish (→ no ranking)

Men's High Jump

- Rodolfo Bergamo

- Qualification — 2.16m
- Final — 2.18m (→ 6th place)

- Riccardo Fortini

- Qualification — 2.05m (→ did not advance)

- Oscar Raise

- Qualification — 2.05m (→ did not advance)

Men's Long Jump

- Roberto Veglia

- Heat — 7.48m (→ did not advance)

Men's Discus Throw

- Armando Devincentis

- Qualification — 62.26m
- Final — 55.86m (→ 15th place)

- Silvano Simeon

- Qualification — 59.06m (→ did not advance)

Men's 20 km Race Walk

- Armando Zambaldo — 1:28:25 (→ 6th place)
- Vittorio Visini — 1:29:31 (→ 8th place)
- Roberto Buccione — 1:30:40 (→ 10th place)

== Basketball ==
Men's team competition

- Preliminary round (group B):

- Lost to United States (86-106)
- Defeated Czechoslovakia (79-69)
- Lost to Yugoslavia (87-88)
- Defeated Puerto Rico (95-81)

- Classification Matches:

- 5th/8th place: Defeated Australia (79-72)
- 5th/6th place: Defeated Czechoslovakia (98-75) → Fifth place

- Team roster

- Giuseppe Brumatti
- Giulio Jellini
- Carlo Recalcati
- Luciano Vendemini
- Fabrizio Delia Fiori
- Renzo Bariviera
- Marino Zanatta
- Dino Meneghin
- Pier Luigi Marzorati
- Luigi Serafini
- Ivan Bisson
- Gianni Bertolotti

- Head coach: Primo Giancarlo

== Boxing ==
Men's Flyweight

- Giovanni Camputaro (=9th)

Men's Bantamweight

- Bernardo Onori (=9th)

Men's Lightweight

- Gaetano Pirastu (=22nd)

Men's Light welterweight

- Daniele Zappaterra (=25th)

Men's Welterweight

- Luigi Minchillo (=9th)

Men's Light middleweight

- Pierangelo Pira (=9th)

== Canoeing ==
11 male canoeists represented Italy.

Men's C-1 500 metres

- Pietro Bruschi (eliminated in the repechages)

Men's C-1 1000 metres

- Pietro Bruschi (eliminated in the semifinals)

Men's C-2 500 metres

- Tiziano Annoni, Ilario Passerini (eliminated in the repechages)

Men's C-2 1000 metres

- Tiziano Annoni, Ilario Passerini (eliminated in the semifinals)

Men's K-1 500 metres

- Oreste Perri (7th place)

Men's K-1 1000 metres

- Oreste Perri (4th place)

Men's K-2 500 metres

- Paolo Lepori, Pier Duilio Puccetti (eliminated in the semifinals)

Men's K-2 1000 metres

- Danio Merli, Giorgio Sbruzzi (eliminated in the semifinals)

Men's K-4 1000 metres

- Luciano Buonfiglio, Massimo Moriconi, Pier Duilio Puccetti, Andrea Salvietti (eliminated in the repechages)

== Cycling ==
Fourteen cyclists represented Italy in 1976.

Individual road race

- Giuseppe Martinelli — 4:47:23 (→ Silver Medal)
- Vittorio Algeri — 4:47:23 (→ 8th place)
- Roberto Ceruti — 4:49:01 (→ 26th place)
- Carmelo Barone — 4:49:01 (→ 31st place)

Team time trial

- Carmelo Barone
- Vito Da Ros
- Gino Lori
- Dino Porrini

Sprint

- Giorgio Rossi — eliminated in quarterfinals (→ 8th place)

1000m time trial

- Massimo Marino — 1:08.488 (→ 10th place)

Individual pursuit

- Orfeo Pizzoferrato — 5th place

Team pursuit

- Sandro Callari
- Cesare Cipollini
- Rino De Candido
- Giuseppe Saronni

== Diving ==
Men's 3 metre springboard

- Giorgio Cagnotto Silver
- Klaus Dibiasi (8th place)
- Claudio De Miro (22nd place)

Men's 10 metre platform

- Klaus Dibiasi Gold
- Claudio De Miro (13th place)

Women's 10 metre platform

- Carmen Casteiner (19th place)

== Equestrian ==
Individual dressage

- Fausto Puccini (27th place)

DNS: Domenico Susanna

Individual eventing

- Federico Roman (9th place)
- Mario Turner (14th place)
- Alessandro Argenton (22nd place)
- Giovanni Bossi DNF

Team eventing

- Federico Roman, Mario Turner, Alessandro Argenton, Giovanni Bossi (4th place)

Individual jumping

- Raimondo D'Inzeo (12th place)
- Graziano Mancinelli (=25th place)
- Piero D'Inzeo (=25th place)

DNS: Vittorio Orlandi
Team jumping

- Raimondo D'Inzeo, Graziano Mancinelli, Raimondo D'Inzeo, Giorgio Nuti (9th place)

Vittorio Orlandi DNS

== Fencing ==
18 fencers, 13 men and 5 women, represented Italy in 1976.

Men's foil

- Fabio Dal Zotto
- Carlo Montano
- Stefano Simoncelli

Men's team foil

- Carlo Montano, Fabio Dal Zotto, Stefano Simoncelli, Giovanni Battista Coletti, Attilio Calatroni

Men's épée

- John Pezza
- Nicola Granieri
- Marcello Bertinetti

Men's team épée

- John Pezza, Nicola Granieri, Fabio Dal Zotto, Marcello Bertinetti, Giovanni Battista Coletti

Men's sabre

- Mario Aldo Montano
- Michele Maffei
- Angelo Arcidiacono

Men's team sabre

- Mario Aldo Montano, Mario Tullio Montano, Michele Maffei, Tommaso Montano, Angelo Arcidiacono

Women's foil

- Maria Consolata Collino
- Carola Mangiarotti
- Giulia Lorenzoni

Women's team foil

- Maria Consolata Collino, Giulia Lorenzoni, Doriana Pigliapoco, Susanna Batazzi, Carola Mangiarotti

== Judo ==
3 male judokas represented Italy.

Men's Lightweight (63 kg)

- Felice Mariani Bronze

Men's Half-Middleweight (70 kg)

- Ezio Gamba (=11th)

Men's Half-Heavyweight (93 kg)

- Mario Vecchi (=30th)

Men's Heavyweight 9+93 kg)

- Mario Daminelli DNS

Men's open category

- Mario Daminelli DNS

== Modern pentathlon ==
Three male pentathletes represented Italy in 1976.

Individual

- Daniele Masala
- Pierpaolo Cristofori
- Mario Medda

Team

- Daniele Masala
- Pierpaolo Cristofori
- Mario Medda

== Swimming ==
Men's Competition

- Marcello Guarducci, Roberto Pangaro, Paolo Revelli, Enrico Bisso, Giorgio Lalle, Paolo Barelli, and Riccardo Urbani

Men's 4 × 200 m Freestyle Relay

- Marcello Guarducci, Roberto Pangaro, Paolo Barelli, and Paolo Revelli

- Final — 7:43.39 (→ 8th place)

Men's 4 × 100 m Medley Relay

- Enrico Bisso, Giorgio Lalle, Paolo Barelli, and Marcello Guarducci

- Final — 3:52.92 (→ 7th place)

Women's Competition

- Laura Bortolotti, Giuditta Pandini, Antonella Roncelli, Iris Corniani, Donatella Schiavon, and Elisabetta Dessy

== Volleyball ==
Men's team competition

- Preliminary round (group B)

- Lost to Soviet Union (0-3)
- Lost to Japan (0-3)
- Lost to Brazil (2-3)

- Classification Matches

- 5th/8th place: Lost to Czechoslovakia (0-3)
- 7th/8th place: Lost to Brazil (0-3) → 8th place

- Team roster

- Andrea Nannini
- Paolo Montorsi
- Stefano Sibani
- Giorgio Goldoni
- Francesco Dall'Olio
- Fabrizio Nassi
- Rodolfo Giovenzana
- Andrea Nencini
- Mario Mattioli
- Giovanni Lanfranco
- Erasmo Salemme
- Marco Negri

- Head coach: Franco Anderlini

== Water polo ==
Men's team competition

- Team roster

- Alberto Alberani
- Roldano Simeoni
- Silvio Baracchini
- Sante Marsili
- Marcello Del Duca
- Gianni de Magistris
- Alessandro Ghibellini
- Luigi Castagnola
- Riccardo de Magistris
- Vincenzo D'Angelo
- Umberto Panerai

== Weightlifting ==
Men's Featherweight (60 kg)

- Peppino Tanti (10th)

== Wrestling ==
Men's Freestyle 48 kg (light flyweight)

- Claudio Pollio (=14th)

Men's Freestyle 52 kg (flyweight)

- Giuseppe Bognanni (=10th)

Men's Freestyle 74 kg (welterweight)

- Giuseppe Spagnoli (=13th)

Men's Greco-Roman 48 kg (light flyweight)

- Antonio Quistelli (=13th)

Men's Greco-Roman 52 kg (flyweight)

- Antonino Caltabiano (7th)

Men's Greco-Roman 62 kg (featherweight)

- Domenico Giuffrida (=14th)

Men's Greco-Roman 68 kg (lightweight)

- Gian Matteo Ranzi (10th)

Men's Greco-Roman 82 kg (middleweight)

- Giuseppe Vitucci (=13th)
