= Water polo at the 1975 World Aquatics Championships – Men's tournament =

Tournament details
- Venue: Colombia (in Cali host cities)
- Dates: 19 – 26 July
- Teams: 16 (from 4 confederations)

Final positions
- Champions: Soviet Union (1st title)
- Runners-up: Hungary
- Third place: Italy
- Fourth place: Cuba

Tournament statistics
- Matches played: 64
- Goals scored: 661 (10.33 per match)

The 1975 Men's World Water Polo Championship was the second edition of the men's water polo tournament at the World Aquatics Championships, organised by the world governing body in aquatics, the FINA. The tournament was held from 19 to 26 July 1975, and was incorporated into the 1975 World Aquatics Championships in Cali, Colombia.

It was the second edition of the event.

== Participating teams ==
Americas	Asia	Europe	Oceania
Canada; Colombia; Cuba; Mexico; United States	Iran	Bulgaria; Hungary; Italy; Netherlands; Romania; Soviet Union; Spain; West Germany; Yugoslavia	Australia

=== Groups formed ===
GROUP A

- Bulgaria
- Cuba
- Yugoslavia
- West Germany

GROUP B

- Australia
- Colombia
- Hungary
- Romania

GROUP C

- Iran
- Soviet Union
- Spain
- United States

GROUP D

- Canada
- Italy
- Netherlands
- Mexico

== Preliminary round ==
Qualified for places 1–8, separated in 2 round robin groups of 4 teams each. (Group E and F)
Qualified for places 9–16, separated in 2 round robin groups of 4 teams each. (Group G and H)

=== Group A ===
Pos	Team	Pts	Pld	W	D	L	GF	GA	GD
1	West Germany	4	3	2	0	1	13	8	+5
2	Cuba	4	3	2	0	1	17	14	+3
3	Yugoslavia	4	3	2	0	1	15	12	+3
4	Bulgaria	0	3	0	0	3	9	20	−11

- 19 July 1975

Yugoslavia	8 – 3	Bulgaria
Cuba	5 – 4	West Germany

- 20 July 1975

Yugoslavia	7 – 4	Cuba
West Germany	4 – 3	Bulgaria

- 21 July 1975

Cuba	8 – 3	Bulgaria
West Germany	5 – 0	Yugoslavia [disqualified]

=== Group B ===
Pos	Team	Pts	Pld	W	D	L	GF	GA	GD
1	Hungary	6	3	3	0	0	28	15	+13
2	Romania	4	3	2	0	1	30	18	+12
3	Australia	2	3	1	0	2	16	21	−5
4	Colombia	0	3	0	0	3	9	29	−20

- 19 July 1975

Hungary	8 – 7	Romania
Australia	6 – 1	Colombia

- 20 July 1975

Romania	14 – 5	Colombia
Hungary	11 – 5	Australia

- 21 July 1975

Romania	9 – 5	Australia
Hungary	9 – 3	Colombia

=== Group C ===
Pos	Team	Pts	Pld	W	D	L	GF	GA	GD
1	Soviet Union	5	3	2	1	0	24	10	+14
2	United States	4	3	1	2	0	22	9	+13
3	Spain	3	3	1	1	1	20	13	+7
4	Iran	0	3	0	0	3	5	39	−34

- 19 July 1975

Spain	12 – 2	Iran
Soviet Union	4 – 4	United States

- 20 July 1975

United States	4 – 4	Spain
Soviet Union	13 – 2	Iran

- 21 July 1975

Soviet Union	7 – 4	Spain
United States	14 – 1	Iran

=== Group D ===
Pos	Team	Pts	Pld	W	D	L	GF	GA	GD
1	Italy	6	3	3	0	0	16	12	+4
2	Netherlands	4	3	2	0	1	17	10	+7
3	Mexico	2	3	1	0	2	12	15	−3
4	Canada	0	3	0	0	3	12	20	−8

- 19 July 1975

Netherlands	9 – 4	Canada
Italy	6 – 5	Mexico

- 20 July 1975

Italy	6 – 4	Canada
Netherlands	5 – 2	Mexico

- 21 July 1975

Mexico	5 – 4	Canada
Italy	4 – 3	Netherlands

== Second round ==
Qualified for places 1–4 in a round robin group. (Group L)
Will play for places 5–8 in a round robin group. (Group I)
Will play for places 9–12 in a round robin group. (Group J)
Will play for places 13–16 in a round robin group (Group K)

=== Group E ===
Pos	Team	Pts	Pld	W	D	L	GF	GA	GD
1	Hungary	6	3	3	0	0	23	18	+5
2	Cuba	4	3	2	0	1	13	12	+1
3	West Germany	2	3	1	0	2	15	16	−1
4	Romania	0	3	0	0	3	11	16	−5

Preliminary round results apply.

- 22 July 1975

Hungary	8 – 6	Cuba

- 23 July 1975

Cuba	4 – 2	Romania
Hungary	9 – 7	West Germany

- 24 July 1975

West Germany	4 – 2	Romania

=== Group F ===
Pos	Team	Pts	Pld	W	D	L	GF	GA	GD
1	Soviet Union	5	3	2	1	0	11	8	+3
2	Italy	4	3	2	0	1	16	10	+6
3	United States	3	3	1	1	1	12	16	−4
4	Netherlands	0	3	0	0	3	7	12	−5

Preliminary round results apply.

- 22 July 1975

Soviet Union	3 – 2	Italy
United States	4 – 2	Netherlands

- 23 July 1975

Soviet Union	4 – 2	Netherlands
Italy	10 – 4	United States

=== Group G ===
Pos	Team	Pts	Pld	W	D	L	GF	GA	GD
1	Australia	4	3	2	0	1	15	7	+8
2	Bulgaria	4	3	2	0	1	21	14	+7
3	Yugoslavia	4	3	2	0	1	11	8	+3
4	Colombia	0	3	0	0	3	3	21	−18

Preliminary round results apply.

- 22 July 1975

Bulgaria	6 – 4	Australia

- 23 July 1975

Bulgaria	12 – 2	Colombia
Australia	5 – 0	Yugoslavia [forfeit]

- 24 July 1975

Yugoslavia	3 – 0	Colombia

=== Group H ===
Pos	Team	Pts	Pld	W	D	L	GF	GA	GD
1	Spain	6	3	3	0	0	28	12	+16
2	Mexico	4	3	2	0	1	17	14	+3
3	Canada	2	3	1	0	2	15	18	−3
4	Iran	0	3	0	0	3	9	26	−17

Preliminary round results apply.

- 22 July 1975

Spain	7 – 5	Mexico
Canada	6 – 4	Iran

- 23 July 1975

Spain	9 – 5	Canada
Mexico	7 – 3	Iran

== Final round ==
=== 13th – 16th places (Group K) ===
Pos	Team	Pts	Pld	W	D	L	GF	GA	GD
13	Yugoslavia	6	3	3	0	0	27	12	+15
14	Canada	4	3	2	0	1	24	15	+9
15	Iran	2	3	1	0	2	11	24	−13
16	Colombia	0	3	0	0	3	10	21	−11

- 25 July 1975

Yugoslavia	13 – 2	Iran
Canada	10 – 3	Colombia

- 26 July 1975

Yugoslavia	6 – 3	Colombia
Canada	7 – 4	Iran

- 27 July 1975

Yugoslavia	8 – 7	Canada
Iran	5 – 4	Colombia

=== 9th – 12th places (Group J) ===
Pos	Team	Pts	Pld	W	D	L	GF	GA	GD
9	Mexico	5	3	2	1	0	15	10	+5
10	Spain	4	3	1	2	0	18	15	+3
11	Australia	2	3	1	0	2	12	12	0
12	Bulgaria	1	3	0	1	2	9	17	−8

- 25 July 1975

Mexico	4 – 1	Australia
Spain	5 – 5	Bulgaria

- 26 July 1975

Mexico	5 – 5	Spain
Australia	6 – 0	Bulgaria

- 27 July 1975

Mexico	6 – 4	Bulgaria
Spain	8 – 5	Australia

=== 5th – 8th places (Group I) ===
Pos	Team	Pts	Pld	W	D	L	GF	GA	GD
5	Romania	4	3	2	0	1	15	12	+3
6	West Germany	4	3	2	0	1	18	17	+1
7	Netherlands	4	3	2	0	1	12	11	+1
8	United States	0	3	0	0	3	14	19	−5

- 25 July 1975

Romania	6 – 3	United States
Netherlands	5 – 3	West Germany

- 26 July 1975

West Germany	7 – 5	Romania
Netherlands	5 – 4	United States

- 27 July 1975

Romania	4 – 2	Netherlands
West Germany	8 – 7	United States

=== 1st - 4th places Final standings (Group L) ===
Pos	Team	Pts	Pld	W	D	L	GF	GA	GD
1	Soviet Union	5	3	2	1	0	18	12	+6
2	Hungary	4	3	2	0	1	17	14	+3
3	Italy	2	3	0	2	1	14	16	−2
4	Cuba	1	3	0	1	2	11	18	−7

- 25 July 1975

Soviet Union	8 – 3	Cuba
Hungary	7 – 5	Italy

- 26 July 1975

Soviet Union	5 – 5	Italy
Hungary	6 – 4	Cuba

- 27 July 1975

Soviet Union	5 – 4	Hungary
Italy	4 – 4	Cuba

== Final ranking ==
RANK	TEAM
	Soviet Union
	Hungary
	Italy
4.	Cuba
5.	Romania
6.	West Germany
7.	Netherlands
8.	United States
9.	Mexico
10.	Spain
11.	Australia
12.	Bulgaria
13.	Yugoslavia
14.	Canada
15.	Iran
16.	Colombia

1975 FINA Men's World champions

Soviet Union
First title

Team Roster

Alexei Barkalov, Aleksandr Dreval, Aleksandr Dolgushin, Sergey Gorshkhov, Aleksandr Kabanov, Anatoly Klebanov, Nicolai Melnikov, Aleksandr Rodionov, Vitaly Romanchuk, Vitali Rozkov, Aleksandr Zakharov
Head coach: Anatoly Blumental

== Medalists ==
Gold	Silver	Bronze
Soviet Union Aleksei Barkalov; Aleksandr Dreval; Aleksandr Dolgushin; Sergey Gorshkhov; Aleksandr Kabanov; Anatoly Klebanov; Nikolay Melnikov; Aleksandr Rodionov; Vitaly Romanchuk; Vitaly Rozkov; Aleksandr Zakharov Head coach: Anatoly Blumental	Hungary Endre Molnár; Tamás Faragó; Gábor Csapó; István Szívós; András Bodnár; Ferenc Konrád; István Magas; László Sarosi; György Horkai; Tibor Cservenyák; István Görgényi Head coach: Dezső Gyarmati	Italy Alberto Alberani; Roldano Simeoni; Silvio Baracchini; Sante Marsili; Roberto Castagnola; Gianni De Magistris; Alessandro Ghibellini; Luigi Castagnola; Marcello Del Duca; Vincenzo D'Angelo; Mario Scotti-Galletta Head coach: Gianni Lonzi
