= Water polo at the 1978 World Aquatics Championships – Men's tournament =

Tournament details
- Venue: West Berlin
- Dates: 19 – 27 August
- Teams: 16 (from 4 confederations)

Final positions
- Champions: Italy (1st title)
- Runners-up: Hungary
- Third place: Yugoslavia
- Fourth place: Soviet Union

Tournament statistics
- Matches played: 64
- Goals scored: 638 (9.97 per match)

The 1978 Men's World Water Polo Championship was the third edition of the men's water polo tournament at the World Aquatics Championships, organised by the world governing body in aquatics, the FINA. The tournament was held from 19 to 27 August 1978, and was incorporated into the 1978 World Aquatics Championships in West Berlin.

== Participating teams ==
Americas	Europe	Oceania
Canada; Cuba; Mexico; United States	Bulgaria; Greece; Hungary; Italy; Israel; Netherlands; Romania; Soviet Union; Spain; West Germany; Yugoslavia	Australia

=== Groups formed ===
GROUP A

- Australia
- Canada
- Italy
- Soviet Union

GROUP B

- Cuba
- Mexico
- Romania
- United States

GROUP C

- Bulgaria
- West Germany
- Israel
- Netherlands

GROUP D

- Greece
- Hungary
- Spain
- Yugoslavia

== First round ==
Qualified for places 1–8, separated in 2 round robin groups of 4 teams each. (Group E and F)
Qualified for places 9–16, separated in 2 round robin groups of 4 teams each. (Group G and H)

=== Group A ===
Pos	Team	Pts	Pld	W	D	L	GF	GA	GD
1	Soviet Union	5	3	2	1	0	17	9	+8
2	Italy	5	3	2	1	0	15	12	+3
3	Australia	2	3	1	0	2	14	18	−4
4	Canada	0	3	0	0	3	8	15	−7

- 19 August 1978

Soviet Union	5 – 1	Canada
Italy	6 – 5	Australia

- 20 August 1978

Soviet Union	5 – 5	Italy
Australia	6 – 5	Canada

- 21 August 1978

Italy	4 – 2	Canada
Soviet Union	7 – 3	Australia

=== Group B ===
Pos	Team	Pts	Pld	W	D	L	GF	GA	GD
1	Romania	5	3	2	1	0	17	11	+6
2	United States	4	3	2	0	1	18	7	+11
3	Cuba	3	3	1	1	1	9	11	−2
4	Mexico	0	3	0	0	3	9	24	−15

- 19 August 1978

Romania	10 – 5	Mexico
United States	5 – 2	Cuba

- 20 August 1978

Romania	3 – 2	United States
Cuba	3 – 2	Mexico

- 21 August 1978

Romania	4 – 4	Cuba
United States	11 – 2	Mexico

=== Group C ===
Pos	Team	Pts	Pld	W	D	L	GF	GA	GD
1	West Germany	6	3	3	0	0	27	7	+20
2	Bulgaria	4	3	2	0	1	12	14	−2
3	Netherlands	2	3	1	0	2	14	12	+2
4	Israel	0	3	0	0	3	4	24	−20

- 19 August 1978

West Germany	9 – 2	Bulgaria
Netherlands	7 – 1	Israel

- 20 August 1978

Bulgaria	4 – 3	Netherlands
West Germany	11 – 1	Israel

- 21 August 1978

West Germany	7 – 4	Netherlands
Bulgaria	6 – 2	Israel

=== Group D ===
Pos	Team	Pts	Pld	W	D	L	GF	GA	GD
1	Hungary	6	3	3	0	0	19	10	+9
2	Yugoslavia	4	3	2	0	1	18	9	+9
3	Greece	2	3	1	0	2	11	22	−11
4	Spain	0	3	0	0	3	14	21	−7

- 19 August 1978

Greece	6 – 5	Spain
Hungary	3 – 2	Yugoslavia

- 20 August 1978

Hungary	6 – 3	Greece
Yugoslavia	5 – 4	Spain

- 21 August 1978

Yugoslavia	11 – 2	Greece
Hungary	10 – 5	Spain

== Second round ==
Qualified for places 1–4 in a round robin group. (Group L)
Will play for places 5–8 in a round robin group. (Group I)
Will play for places 9–12 in a round robin group. (Group J)
Will play for places 13–16 in a round robin group (Group K)

=== Group E ===
Pos	Team	Pts	Pld	W	D	L	GF	GA	GD
1	Italy	8	5	3	2	0	26	18	+8
2	Soviet Union	7	5	3	1	1	24	12	+12
3	United States	7	5	3	1	1	25	13	+12
4	Romania	5	5	2	1	2	19	23	−4

First round results apply.

- 22 August 1978

United States	3 – 2	Soviet Union
Italy	7 – 2	Romania

- 23 August 1978

Italy	4 – 4	United States
Soviet Union	5 – 0	Romania

=== Group F ===
Pos	Team	Pts	Pld	W	D	L	GF	GA	GD
1	Hungary	9	5	4	1	0	36	22	+14
2	Yugoslavia	8	5	4	0	1	32	15	+17
3	West Germany	7	5	3	1	1	36	17	+19
4	Bulgaria	4	5	2	0	3	21	35	−14

First round results apply.

- 22 August 1978

Yugoslavia	10 – 3	Bulgaria
Hungary	6 – 6	West Germany

- 23 August 1978

Yugoslavia	4 – 3	West Germany
Hungary	11 – 6	Bulgaria

=== Group G ===
Pos	Team	Pts	Pld	W	D	L	GF	GA	GD
1	Cuba	6	3	3	0	0	19	8	+11
2	Australia	4	3	2	0	1	15	18	−3
3	Mexico	2	3	1	0	2	11	12	−1
4	Canada	0	3	0	0	3	11	18	−7

First round results apply.

- 22 August 1978

Cuba	8 – 3	Canada
Australia	6 – 5	Mexico

- 23 August 1978

Mexico	4 – 3	Canada
Cuba	8 – 3	Australia

=== Group H ===
Pos	Team	Pts	Pld	W	D	L	GF	GA	GD
1	Spain	4	3	2	0	1	24	12	+12
2	Greece	4	3	2	0	1	20	15	+5
3	Netherlands	4	3	2	0	1	18	13	+5
4	Israel	0	3	0	0	3	6	18	−12

First round results apply.

- 22 August 1978

Netherlands	7 – 5	Greece
Spain	12 – 2	Israel

- 23 August 1978

Greece	9 – 3	Israel
Spain	7 – 4	Netherlands

== Final round ==
=== 13th – 16th places (Group K) ===
Pos	Team	Pts	Pld	W	D	L	GF	GA	GD
13	Netherlands	6	3	3	0	0	17	8	+9
14	Canada	4	3	2	0	1	15	10	+5
15	Mexico	2	3	1	0	2	18	15	+3
16	Israel	0	3	0	0	3	4	21	−17

- 25 August 1978

Netherlands	7 – 1	Canada
Mexico	10 – 2	Israel

- 26 August 1978

Netherlands	4 – 2	Israel
Canada	7 – 3	Mexico

- 27 August 1978

Canada	7 – 0	Israel
Netherlands	6 – 5	Mexico

=== 9th – 12th places (Group J) ===
Pos	Team	Pts	Pld	W	D	L	GF	GA	GD
9	Australia	6	3	3	0	0	23	15	+8
10	Cuba	3	3	1	1	1	21	15	+6
11	Spain	3	3	1	1	1	22	19	+3
12	Greece	0	3	0	0	3	9	26	−17

- 25 August 1978

Australia	8 – 7	Spain
Cuba	9 – 2	Greece

- 26 August 1978

Spain	9 – 5	Greece
Australia	7 – 6	Cuba

- 27 August 1978

Cuba	6 – 6	Spain
Australia	8 – 2	Greece

=== 5th – 8th places (Group I) ===
Pos	Team	Pts	Pld	W	D	L	GF	GA	GD
5	United States	6	3	3	0	0	20	6	+14
6	Romania	4	3	2	0	1	13	10	+3
7	West Germany	2	3	1	0	2	23	15	+8
8	Bulgaria	0	3	0	0	3	8	33	−25

- 25 August 1978

United States	12 – 2	Bulgaria
Romania	6 – 5	West Germany

- 26 August 1978

West Germany	15 – 3	Bulgaria
United States	2 – 1	Romania

- 27 August 1978

Romania	6 – 3	Bulgaria
United States	6 – 3	West Germany

=== 1st - 4th places Final standings (Group L) ===
Pos	Team	Pts	Pld	W	D	L	GF	GA	GD
1	Italy	5	3	2	1	0	15	13	+2
2	Hungary	4	3	1	2	0	13	11	+2
3	Yugoslavia	2	3	1	0	2	14	15	−1
4	Soviet Union	1	3	0	1	2	12	15	−3

- 25 August 1978

Hungary	4 – 4	Soviet Union
Italy	6 – 5	Yugoslavia

- 26 August 1978

Italy	5 – 4	Soviet Union
Hungary	5 – 3	Yugoslavia

- 27 August 1978

Yugoslavia	5 – 4	Soviet Union
Italy	4 – 4	Hungary

== Final ranking ==
RANK	TEAM
	Italy
	Hungary
	Yugoslavia
4.	Soviet Union
5.	United States
6.	Romania
7.	West Germany
8.	Bulgaria
9.	Australia
10.	Cuba
11.	Spain
12.	Greece
13.	Netherlands
14.	Canada
15.	Mexico
16.	Israel

1978 FINA Men's World champions

Italy
First title

Team Roster

Alberto Alberani, Silvio Baracchini, Romeo Collina, Gianni De Magistris, Massimo Fondelli, Marco Galli, Sante Marsili, Alessandro Ghibellini, Paolo Ragosa, Mario Scotti-Galletta, Rolando Simeoni
Head coach: Gianni Lonzi

== Medalists ==
Gold	Silver	Bronze
Italy Alberto Alberani; Silvio Baracchini; Romeo Collina; Gianni De Magistris; Massimo Fondelli; Marco Galli; Alessandro Ghibellini; Sante Marsili; Paolo Ragosa; Mario Scotti-Galletta; Roldano Simeoni Head coach: Gianni Lonzi	Hungary Gábor Csapó; Tamás Faragó; Szilveszter Fekete; György Gerendás; György Horkai; György Kenéz; István Magas; Endre Molnár; József Somossy; Attila Sudár; István Szívós Jr. Head coach: Dezső Gyarmati	Yugoslavia Siniša Belamarić; Mirsad Galijaš; Zoran Gopčević; Boško Lozica; Predrag Manojlović; Zoran Mustur; Damir Polić; Zoran Roje; Slobodan Trifunović; Luko Vezilić; Predrag Vraneš Head coach: Miro Ćirković
