= Hungary at the World Aquatics Championships =

- World Aquatics code: HUN
- National federation: MÚSZ (swimming); MVLSZ (water polo)
- Website: musz.hu
- Medals Ranked 8th: Gold 44 Silver 37 Bronze 36 Total 117

World Aquatics Championships appearances (overview)
- 1973; 1975; 1978; 1982; 1986; 1991; 1994; 1998; 2001; 2003; 2005; 2007; 2009; 2011; 2013; 2015; 2017; 2019; 2022; 2023; 2024; 2025

Hungary has participated in all 21 editions of the FINA World Aquatics Championships, held since the first edition of 1973 World Aquatics Championships, winning 117 podiums, including 44 world titles, 37 silver medals and 36 bronze medals.

== Swimming ==
All Hungarian medals till Singapore 2025.

| Edition | Gold | Silver | Bronze | Total |
|---|---|---|---|---|
| (Socialist Federal Republic of Yugoslavia) Belgrade 1973 | 400 m individual medley András Hargitay | | | 3 |
| (Socialist Federal Republic of Yugoslavia) Belgrade 1973 | | 200 m backstroke Zoltán Verrasztó | | 3 |
| (Socialist Federal Republic of Yugoslavia) Belgrade 1973 | | | 200 m backstroke Andrea Gyarmati | 3 |
| (Colombia) Cali 1975 | 200 m backstroke Zoltán Verrasztó | | | 3 |
| (Colombia) Cali 1975 | 200 m individual medley András Hargitay | | | 3 |
| (Colombia) Cali 1975 | 400 m individual medley András Hargitay | | | 3 |
| (West Germany) West Berlin 1978 | | | 200 m backstroke Zoltán Verrasztó | 2 |
| (West Germany) West Berlin 1978 | | | 400 m individual medley András Hargitay | 2 |
| (Ecuador) Guayaquil 1982 | | 200 m backstroke Sándor Wladár | | 1 |
| (Spain) Madrid 1986 | 200 m breaststroke József Szabó | | | 3 |
| (Spain) Madrid 1986 | 200 m individual medley Tamás Darnyi | | | 3 |
| (Spain) Madrid 1986 | 400 m individual medley Tamás Darnyi | | | 3 |
| (Australia) Perth 1991 | 100 m backstroke Krisztina Egerszegi | 100 m backstroke Tünde Szabó | | 8 |
| (Australia) Perth 1991 | 200 m backstroke Krisztina Egerszegi | | | 8 |
| (Australia) Perth 1991 | 100 m breaststroke Norbert Rózsa | | | 8 |
| (Australia) Perth 1991 | 200 m individual medley Tamás Darnyi | | | 8 |
| (Australia) Perth 1991 | 400 m individual medley Tamás Darnyi | | | 8 |
| (Australia) Perth 1991 | | 200 m breaststroke Norbert Rózsa | | 8 |
| (Australia) Perth 1991 | | | 200 m butterfly Tamás Darnyi | 8 |
| (Italy) Rome 1994 | 100 m breaststroke Norbert Rózsa | 100 m breaststroke Károly Güttler | | 9 |
| (Italy) Rome 1994 | 200 m breaststroke Norbert Rózsa | | 200 m breaststroke Károly Güttler | 9 |
| (Italy) Rome 1994 | | 200 m backstroke Krisztina Egerszegi | | 9 |
| (Italy) Rome 1994 | | 25 km open water Rita Kovács | | 9 |
| (Italy) Rome 1994 | | | 100 m backstroke Tamás Deutsch | 9 |
| (Italy) Rome 1994 | | | 200 m individual medley Attila Czene | 9 |
| (Italy) Rome 1994 | | | 4×100 m medley relay Tamás Deutsch; Norbert Rózsa; Péter Horváth; Attila Czene | 9 |
| (Australia) Perth 1998 | 200 m breaststroke Ágnes Kovács | | | 3 |
| (Australia) Perth 1998 | | | 200 m breaststroke Norbert Rózsa | 3 |
| (Australia) Perth 1998 | | | 4×100 m medley relay Attila Czene; Norbert Rózsa; Péter Horváth; Attila Zubor | 3 |
| (Japan) Fukuoka 2001 | 200 m breaststroke Ágnes Kovács | | | 2 |
| (Japan) Fukuoka 2001 | | | 100 m breaststroke Ágnes Kovács | 2 |
| (Spain) Barcelona 2003 | | 400 m freestlye Éva Risztov | | 5 |
| (Spain) Barcelona 2003 | | 200 m butterfly Éva Risztov | | 5 |
| (Spain) Barcelona 2003 | | 200 m individual medley Éva Risztov | | 5 |
| (Spain) Barcelona 2003 | | 400 m individual medley László Cseh | | 5 |
| (Spain) Barcelona 2003 | | | 50 m breaststroke Mihály Flaskay | 5 |
| (Canada) Montreal 2005 | 400 m individual medley László Cseh | | | 3 |
| (Canada) Montreal 2005 | | 200 m individual medley László Cseh | | 3 |
| (Canada) Montreal 2005 | | | 100 m backstroke László Cseh | 3 |
| (Australia) Melbourne 2007 | | | 200 m individual medley László Cseh | 1 |
| (Italy) Rome 2009 | 200 m breaststroke Dániel Gyurta | | | 6 |
| (Italy) Rome 2009 | 400 m individual medley Katinka Hosszú | | | 6 |
| (Italy) Rome 2009 | | 200 m individual medley László Cseh | | 6 |
| (Italy) Rome 2009 | | | 200 m butterfly Katinka Hosszú | 6 |
| (Italy) Rome 2009 | | | 200 m individual medley Katinka Hosszú | 6 |
| (Italy) Rome 2009 | | | 400 m individual medley László Cseh | 6 |
| (China) Shanghai 2011 | 200 m breaststroke Dániel Gyurta | | | 5 |
| (China) Shanghai 2011 | | | 25 km open water Csaba Gercsák | 5 |
| (China) Shanghai 2011 | | | 800 m freestlye Gergő Kis | 5 |
| (China) Shanghai 2011 | | | 1500 m freestlye Gergő Kis | 5 |
| (China) Shanghai 2011 | | | 200 m individual medley László Cseh | 5 |
| (Spain) Barcelona 2013 | 200 m breaststroke Dániel Gyurta | | | 5 |
| (Spain) Barcelona 2013 | 200 m individual medley Katinka Hosszú | | | 5 |
| (Spain) Barcelona 2013 | 400 m individual medley Katinka Hosszú | | | 5 |
| (Spain) Barcelona 2013 | | 100 m butterfly László Cseh | | 5 |
| (Spain) Barcelona 2013 | | | 200 m butterfly Katinka Hosszú | 5 |
| (Russia) Kazan 2015 | 200 m butterfly László Cseh | | | 10 |
| (Russia) Kazan 2015 | 200 m individual medley Katinka Hosszú | | | 10 |
| (Russia) Kazan 2015 | 400 m individual medley Katinka Hosszú | | | 10 |
| (Russia) Kazan 2015 | | 25 km open water Anna Olasz | | 10 |
| (Russia) Kazan 2015 | | 100 m butterfly László Cseh | | 10 |
| (Russia) Kazan 2015 | | 400 m individual medley Dávid Verrasztó | | 10 |
| (Russia) Kazan 2015 | | | 1500 m freestlye Boglárka Kapás | 10 |
| (Russia) Kazan 2015 | | | 200 m backstroke Katinka Hosszú | 10 |
| (Russia) Kazan 2015 | | | 200 m breaststroke Dániel Gyurta | 10 |
| (Russia) Kazan 2015 | | | 50 m butterfly László Cseh | 10 |
| (Hungary) Budapest 2017 | 200 m individual medley Katinka Hosszú | | | 8 |
| (Hungary) Budapest 2017 | 400 m individual medley Katinka Hosszú | | | 8 |
| (Hungary) Budapest 2017 | | 200 m backstroke Katinka Hosszú | | 8 |
| (Hungary) Budapest 2017 | | 100 m butterfly Kristóf Milák | | 8 |
| (Hungary) Budapest 2017 | | 200 m butterfly László Cseh | | 8 |
| (Hungary) Budapest 2017 | | 400 m individual medley Dávid Verrasztó | | 8 |
| (Hungary) Budapest 2017 | | | 200 m butterfly Katinka Hosszú | 8 |
| (Hungary) Budapest 2017 | | | 4×100 m freestyle relay Dominik Kozma; Nándor Németh; Péter Holoda; Richárd Bohus | 8 |
| (South Korea) Gwangju 2019 | 5 km open water Kristóf Rasovszky | | | 5 |
| (South Korea) Gwangju 2019 | 200 m butterfly Kristóf Milák | | | 5 |
| (South Korea) Gwangju 2019 | 200 m butterfly Boglárka Kapás | | | 5 |
| (South Korea) Gwangju 2019 | 200 m individual medley Katinka Hosszú | | | 5 |
| (South Korea) Gwangju 2019 | 400 m individual medley Katinka Hosszú | | | 5 |
| (Hungary) Budapest 2022 | 200 m butterfly Kristóf Milák | | | 4 |
| (Hungary) Budapest 2022 | 100 m butterfly Kristóf Milák | | | 4 |
| (Hungary) Budapest 2022 | | 6 km team relay Réka Rohács; Anna Olasz; Dávid Betlehem; Kristóf Rasovszky | | 4 |
| (Hungary) Budapest 2022 | | | 25 km open water Péter Gálicz | 4 |
| (Japan) Fukuoka 2023 | 200 m backstroke Hubert Kós | | | 3 |
| (Japan) Fukuoka 2023 | | 6 km team relay Bettina Fábián; Anna Olasz; Dávid Betlehem; Kristóf Rasovszky | | 3 |
| (Japan) Fukuoka 2023 | | 10 km open water Kristóf Rasovszky | | 3 |
| (Qatar) Doha 2024 | 10 km open water Kristóf Rasovszky | | | 3 |
| (Qatar) Doha 2024 | | | 6 km team relay Bettina Fábián; Míra Szimcsák; Dávid Betlehem; Kristóf Rasovszky | 3 |
| (Qatar) Doha 2024 | | | 100 m freestyle Nándor Németh | 3 |
| Singapore 2025 | 200 m backstroke Hubert Kós | | | 5 |
| Singapore 2025 | | 3 km knockout sprints Dávid Betlehem | | 5 |
| Singapore 2025 | | | 3 km knockout sprints Bettina Fábián | 5 |
| Singapore 2025 | | | 6 km team relay Bettina Fábián; Viktória Mihályvári-Farkas; Dávid Betlehem; Kristóf Rasovszky | 5 |
| Singapore 2025 | | | 200 m individual medley Hubert Kós | 5 |
| | 38 | 25 | 34 | 97 |

== Water polo ==
All Hungarian medals till Fukuoka 2023.

=== Men's team ===
1973 World Championship - Gold medal

- Balázs Balla, András Bodnár, Gábor Csapó, Tibor Cservenyák (GK), Tamás Faragó, István Görgényi, Zoltán Kásás, Ferenc Konrád, Endre Molnár (GK), László Sárosi, István Szívós Jr.; Coach: Dezső Gyarmati

1975 World Championship - Silver medal

- András Bodnár, Gábor Csapó, Tibor Cservenyák (GK), Tamás Faragó, István Görgényi, György Horkai, Ferenc Konrád, István Magas, Endre Molnár (GK), László Sárosi, István Szívós Jr.; Coach: Dezső Gyarmati

1978 World Championship - Silver medal

- Gábor Csapó, Tamás Faragó, Szilveszter Fekete, György Gerendás, György Horkai, György Kenéz, István Magas, Endre Molnár (GK), József Somossy, Attila Sudár, István Szivós Jr.; Coach: Dezső Gyarmati

1982 World Championship - Silver medal

- László Bors, Imre Budavári, Gábor Csapó, Tibor Cservenyák (GK), György Gerendás, György Horkai, György Kenéz, István Kiss, László Kuncz, Gábor Schmiedt, Attila Sudár, Sándor Tóth, János Varga; Coach: Mihály Mayer

1991 World Championship - Bronze medal

- Tibor Benedek, István Dóczi, Péter Kuna (GK), Csaba Mészáros, Gábor Nemes (GK), Imre Péter, Zsolt Petőváry, Gábor Schmiedt, Tibor Sprok, Frank Tóth, Imre Tóth, László Tóth, Balázs Vincze; Coach: János Konrád

1998 World Championship - Silver medal

- Tibor Benedek, Rajmund Fodor, Tamás Kásás, Gergely Kiss, Zoltán Kovács (GK), Zoltán Kósz (GK), Tamás Märcz, Tamás Molnár, Barnabás Steinmetz, Frank Tóth, Zsolt Varga I., Attila Vári, Balázs Vincze; Coach: Dénes Kemény

2003 World Championship - Gold medal

- Tibor Benedek, Péter Biros, Rajmund Fodor, István Gergely (GK), Tamás Kásás, Gergely Kiss, Norbert Madaras, Tamás Molnár, Barnabás Steinmetz, Zoltán Szécsi (GK), Tamás Varga, Zsolt Varga II., Attila Vári; Coach: Dénes Kemény

2005 World Championship - Silver medal

- Péter Biros, Rajmund Fodor, István Gergely (GK), Tamás Kásás, Csaba Kiss, Gergely Kiss, Norbert Madaras, Tamás Molnár, Ádám Steinmetz, Zoltán Szécsi (GK), Márton Szívós, Dániel Varga, Attila Vári; Coach: Dénes Kemény

2007 World Championship - Silver medal

- Tibor Benedek, Péter Biros, Rajmund Fodor, Tamás Kásás, Gábor Kis, Gergely Kiss (GK), Norbert Madaras, Tamás Molnár, Viktor Nagy, Zoltán Szécsi (GK), Márton Szívós, Dániel Varga, Dénes Varga; Coach: Dénes Kemény

2013 World Championship - Gold medal

- Bence Bátori, Krisztián Bedő, Attila Decker (GK), Ádám Decker, Miklós Gór-Nagy, Balázs Hárai, Norbert Hosnyánszky, Norbert Madaras, Viktor Nagy (GK), Márton Szívós, Dániel Varga, Dénes Varga, Márton Vámos; Coach: Tibor Benedek

2017 World Championship - Silver medal

- Attila Decker (GK), Ádám Decker, Balázs Erdélyi, Miklós Gór-Nagy, Balázs Hárai, Norbert Hosnyánszky, Krisztián Manhercz, Tamás Mezei, Viktor Nagy (GK), Béla Török, Dénes Varga, Márton Vámos, Gergő Zalánki; Coach: Tamás Märcz

2023 World Championship - Gold medal

- Dániel Angyal, Gergő Fekete, Szilárd Jansik, Márton Lévai (GK), Krisztián Manhercz, Erik Molnár, Ádám Nagy, Toni Német, Zoltán Pohl, Dénes Varga, Márton Vámos, Vendel Vigvári, Vince Vigvári, Soma Vogel (GK), Gergő Zalánki; Coach: Zsolt Varga

=== Women's team ===
1994 World Championship - Gold medal

- Katalin Dancsa, Zsuzsanna Dunkel, Andrea Eke, Zsuzsanna Huff, Ildikó Kuna, Irén Rafael, Katalin Rédei, Edit Sipos, Mercédesz Stieber, Orsolya Szalkay, Krisztina Szremkó, Gabriella Tóth, Noemi Tóth; Coach: Gyula Tóth

2001 World Championship - Silver medal

- Katalin Dancsa, Rita Drávucz, Anikó Pelle, Ágnes Primász, Kata Rédei, Edit Sipos, Ildikó Sós, Mercédesz Stieber, Brigitta Szép, Krisztina Szremkó, Zsuzsanna Tiba, Ágnes Valkai, Erzsébet Valkai; Coach: Tamás Faragó

2005 World Championship - Gold medal

- Tímea Benkő, Fruzsina Brávik, Rita Drávucz, Patrícia Horváth, Dóra Kisteleki, Anikó Pelle, Krisztina Serfőző, Mercédesz Stieber, Orsolya Takács, Eszter Tomaskovics, Andrea Tóth I., Ágnes Valkai, Erzsébet Valkai; Coach: Tamás Faragó

2013 World Championship - Bronze medal

- Dóra Antal, Flóra Bolonyai, Barbara Bujka, Krisztina Garda, Anna Illés, Orsolya Kasó, Rita Keszthelyi, Dóra Kisteleki, Katalin Menczinger, Ibolya Kitti Miskolczi, Gabriella Szűcs, Orsolya Takács, Ildikó Tóth; Coach: András Merész

2022 World Championship - Silver medal

- Kamilla Faragó, Edina Gangl, Krisztina Garda, Gréta Gurisatti, Rita Keszthelyi, Dóra Leimeter, Alda Magyari, Geraldine Mahieu, Zsuzsanna Máté, Rebecca Parkes, Natasa Rybanska, Dorottya Szilágyi, Vanda Vályi; Coach: Attila Biró

2024 World Championship - Silver medal

== Medal tables ==
=== By championships ===
| Games | Gold | Silver | Bronze | Total |
|---|---|---|---|---|
| (Socialist Federal Republic of Yugoslavia) 1973 Belgrade | 2 | 1 | 1 | 4 |
| (Colombia) 1975 Cali | 3 | 1 | 0 | 4 |
| (West Germany) 1978 West Berlin | 0 | 1 | 2 | 3 |
| (Ecuador) 1982 Guayaquil | 0 | 2 | 0 | 2 |
| (Spain) 1986 Madrid | 3 | 0 | 0 | 3 |
| (Australia) 1991 Perth | 5 | 2 | 2 | 9 |
| (Italy) 1994 Rome | 3 | 3 | 4 | 10 |
| (Australia) 1998 Perth | 1 | 1 | 2 | 4 |
| (Japan) 2001 Fukuoka | 1 | 1 | 1 | 3 |
| (Spain) 2003 Barcelona | 1 | 4 | 1 | 6 |
| (Canada) 2005 Montreal | 2 | 2 | 1 | 5 |
| (Australia) 2007 Melbourne | 0 | 1 | 1 | 2 |
| (Italy) 2009 Rome | 2 | 1 | 3 | 6 |
| (China) 2011 Shanghai | 1 | 0 | 4 | 5 |
| (Spain) 2013 Barcelona | 4 | 1 | 2 | 7 |
| (Russia) 2015 Kazan | 3 | 3 | 4 | 10 |
| (Hungary) 2017 Budapest | 2 | 5 | 2 | 9 |
| (South Korea) 2019 Gwangju | 5 | 0 | 0 | 5 |
| (Hungary) 2022 Budapest | 2 | 2 | 1 | 5 |
| (Japan) 2023 Fukuoka | 2 | 2 | 0 | 4 |
| (Qatar) 2024 Doha | 1 | 1 | 2 | 4 |
| 2025 Singapore | 1 | 3 | 3 | 7 |
| Totals (22 entries) | 44 | 37 | 36 | 117 |

=== By sport ===
| Sport | Gold | Silver | Bronze | Total |
|---|---|---|---|---|
| Swimming | 36 | 19 | 28 | 83 |
| Water polo | 6 | 12 | 2 | 20 |
| Open water swimming | 2 | 6 | 5 | 13 |
| Totals (3 entries) | 44 | 37 | 35 | 116 |

=== By athlete ===
| Name | Gold | Silver | Bronze | Total |
|---|---|---|---|---|
| Katinka Hosszú | 9 | 1 | 5 | 15 |
| Tamás Darnyi | 4 | 0 | 1 | 5 |
| Kristóf Milák | 3 | 1 | 0 | 4 |
| Norbert Rózsa | 3 | 1 | 0 | 4 |
| András Hargitay | 3 | 0 | 1 | 4 |
| Dániel Gyurta | 3 | 0 | 1 | 4 |
| László Cseh | 2 | 6 | 5 | 13 |
| Kristóf Rasovszky | 2 | 3 | 2 | 7 |
| Dénes Varga | 2 | 2 | 0 | 4 |
| Márton Vámos | 2 | 2 | 0 | 4 |
| Norbert Madaras | 2 | 2 | 0 | 4 |
| Krisztina Egerszegi | 2 | 1 | 0 | 3 |
| Hubert Kós | 2 | 0 | 1 | 3 |
| Ágnes Kovács | 2 | 0 | 1 | 3 |
| Totals (14 entries) | 41 | 19 | 17 | 77 |

Only athletes with more than two gold medals

== See also ==
- Hungary national swimming team
- Hungary national diving team
- Swimming World Championships medal table
