= Szilveszter =

Szilveszter is a Hungarian masculine given name and surname, an equivalent of Sylvester, which means "wooded" or "wild". Notable people with the name include:

== Given name ==
- Szilveszter Csollány (1970–2022), Hungarian gymnast
- Szilveszter Fekete (born 1955), Hungarian water polo coach
- Szilveszter Hangya (born 1994), Hungarian footballer
- Sylvester Levay (born Lévay Szilveszter, 1945), Hungarian recording artist and composer
- Szilveszter Makó (born 1992), Hungarian photographer
- Szilveszter Matuska (1892–after 1944), Hungarian mass murderer and mechanical engineer
- Szilveszter E. Vizi (born 1936), Hungarian physician, neuroscientist, pharmacologist and professor

== Surname ==
- Ferenc Szilveszter (born 1971), Hungarian footballer
