= Nencini =

Nencini is an Italian surname. Notable people with the surname include:

- Andrea Nencini (born 1948), Italian volleyball player
- Gastone Nencini (1930–1980), Italian cyclist
- Lorenzo Nencini (1806–1854), Italian sculptor
- Riccardo Nencini (born 1959), Italian politician
