= Anatoly Klebanov =

Soviet water polo player

Personal information
- Nationality: Soviet
- Born: 8 October 1952 Zhodzina, Belarusian SSR, Soviet Union
- Died: 5 December 2011 (aged 59)

Sport
- Sport: Water polo
Medal record
Representing Soviet Union
World Aquatics Championships
Gold medal – first place	1975 Cali	Team competition

Anatoly Klebanov (8 October 1952 – 5 December 2011) was a Soviet water polo player. He competed in the men's tournament at the 1976 Summer Olympics.

== See also ==
- Soviet Union men's Olympic water polo team records and statistics
- List of men's Olympic water polo tournament goalkeepers
- List of world champions in men's water polo
- List of World Aquatics Championships medalists in water polo
