= Aleksandr Zakharov (water polo) =

Soviet water polo player

Personal information
- Nationality: Soviet
- Born: 3 April 1954 (age 72) Kyiv, Ukrainian SSR, Soviet Union

Sport
- Sport: Water polo
Medal record
Representing Soviet Union
World Championships
Gold medal – first place	1975 Cali	Team competition
European Championships
Silver medal – second place	1974 Vienna	Team competition

Aleksandr Zakharov (born 3 April 1954) is a Soviet water polo player. He competed in the men's tournament at the 1976 Summer Olympics.

== See also ==
- Soviet Union men's Olympic water polo team records and statistics
- List of men's Olympic water polo tournament goalkeepers
- List of world champions in men's water polo
- List of World Aquatics Championships medalists in water polo
