= Vitaly Romanchuk =

Soviet water polo player

Personal information
- Nationality: Soviet
- Born: 14 March 1950 (age 76) Minsk, Belarusian SSR, Soviet Union

Sport
- Sport: Water polo
Medal record
Representing Soviet Union
World Championships
Gold medal – first place	1975 Cali	Team competition
Silver medal – second place	1973 Belgrade	Team competition

Vitaly Romanchuk (born 14 March 1950) is a Soviet water polo player. He competed in the men's tournament at the 1976 Summer Olympics.

== See also ==
- List of world champions in men's water polo
- List of World Aquatics Championships medalists in water polo
