= Gianni De Magistris =

Italian water polo player

Gianni de Magistris
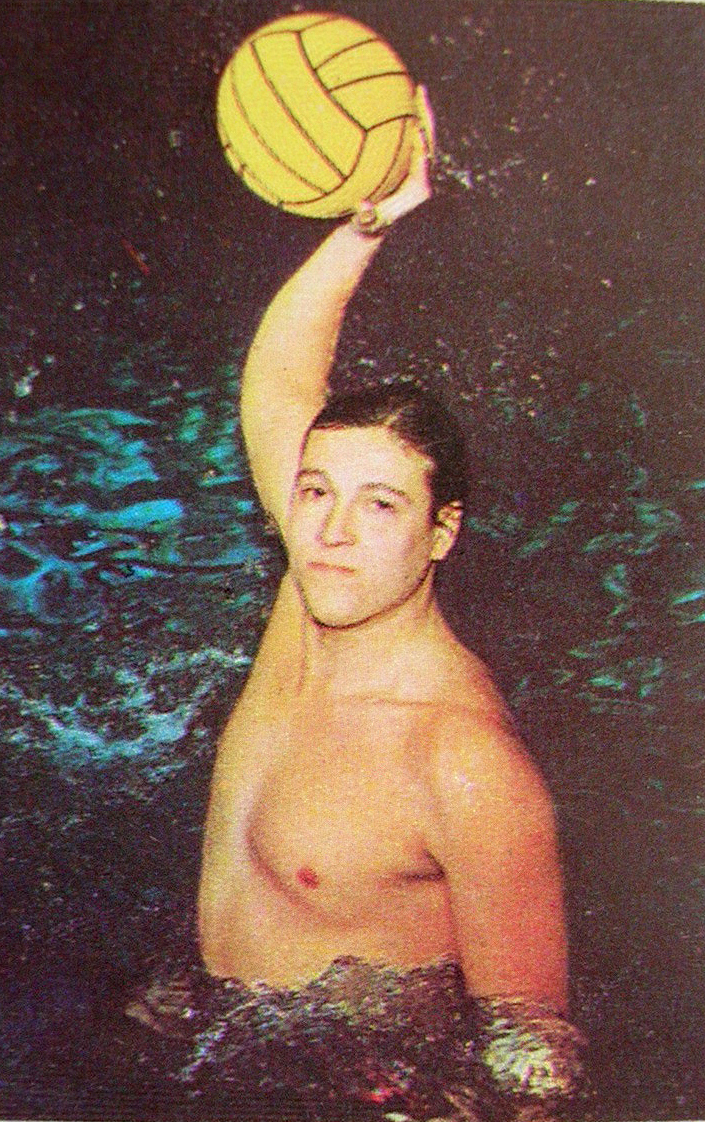

Personal information
- Nationality: Italian
- Born: 3 December 1950 (age 75) Florence, Italy
- Height: 1.85 m (6 ft 1 in)
- Weight: 82 kg (181 lb)

Sport
- Sport: Water polo
- Club: Rari Nantes Florentia
Medal record
Representing Italy
Olympic Games
Silver medal – second place	1976 Montréal	Team
World Championships
Bronze medal – third place	1975 Cali	Team
Gold medal – first place	1978 Berlin	Team
European Championships
Bronze medal – third place	1977 Jönköping	Team

Gianni De Magistris (born 3 December 1950) is an Italian former water polo player. He was part of Italian teams that won the world title in 1978, a silver medal at the 1976 Olympics, and two bronze medals at the 1975 world and 1977 European championships.

Magistris played in five consecutive Summer Olympics for Italy from 1968 to 1984 (at the 1976 games, younger brother Riccardo was among his teammates). He is the third athlete to compete in water polo at five Olympics, after Briton Paul Radmilovic and Hungarian Dezső Gyarmati. He is among the first ten Italians to compete at five Olympics. He is also a leading scorer in Olympic water polo history, with 59 goals.

== See also ==
- Italy men's Olympic water polo team records and statistics
- List of athletes with the most appearances at Olympic Games
- List of players who have appeared in multiple men's Olympic water polo tournaments
- List of Olympic medalists in water polo (men)
- List of men's Olympic water polo tournament top goalscorers
- List of world champions in men's water polo
- List of World Aquatics Championships medalists in water polo
- List of members of the International Swimming Hall of Fame
- Walk of Fame of Italian sport
