= Enrico Bisso =

Italian swimmer

Personal information
- Born: 22 January 1956 Genoa, Italy
- Died: 20 March 2016 (aged 60) Genoa, Italy

Sport
- Sport: Swimming

Enrico Bisso (22 January 1956 – 20 March 2016) was an Italian swimmer. He competed in two events at the 1976 Summer Olympics.
