= Water polo at the 1976 Summer Olympics =

Water polo at the Games of the XXI Olympiad
- Venues: Claude-Robillard Sports Complex; Olympic Pool (final)
- Date: 18–27 July 1976
- Competitors: 131 from 12 nations

Medalists
1st place, gold medalist(s)		Hungary
2nd place, silver medalist(s)		Italy
3rd place, bronze medalist(s)		Netherlands

The water polo tournament at the 1976 Summer Olympics was held from 18 to 27 July 1976 in Montreal, Quebec, Canada.

== Qualification ==
Event	Dates	Hosts	Quotas	Qualified Teams
Host Nation	12 May 1970	(Netherlands) Amsterdam	1	Canada
1974 Asian Games	2-7 September 1974	(Iran) Tehran	1	Iran
1975 World Championships	19-25 July 1975	(Colombia) Cali	6	Soviet Union
1975 World Championships	19-25 July 1975	(Colombia) Cali	6	Hungary
1975 World Championships	19-25 July 1975	(Colombia) Cali	6	Italy
1975 World Championships	19-25 July 1975	(Colombia) Cali	6	Cuba
1975 World Championships	19-25 July 1975	(Colombia) Cali	6	Romania
1975 World Championships	19-25 July 1975	(Colombia) Cali	6	West Germany
1975 Pan American Games	16-20 October 1975	Mexico City	1	Mexico
European Qualifier	23-25 April 1976	(West Germany) West Berlin	1	Yugoslavia
Oceania Qualifier			1	Australia
African Qualifier			~~1~~	~~Nigeria~~
Reallocation			1	Netherlands
Total			12	

== Medalists ==
Gold	Silver	Bronze
Hungary: Gábor Csapó; Tibor Cservenyák; Tamás Faragó; György Gerendás; György Horkai; György Kenéz; Ferenc Konrád; Endre Molnár; László Sárosi; Attila Sudár; István Szívós, Jr.	Italy: Umberto Panerai; Roldano Simeoni; Riccardo De Magistris; Alessandro Ghibellini; Sante Marsili; Vincenzo D'Angelo; Marcello Del Duca; Gianni De Magistris; Alberto Alberani; Silvio Baracchini; Luigi Castagnola	Netherlands: Alex Boegschoten; Ton Buunk; Piet de Zwarte; Andy Hoepelman; Evert Kroon; Nico Landeweerd; Hans Smits; Gijze Stroboer; Rik Toonen; Hans van Zeeland; Jan Evert Veer

== Participating teams ==
Group A

- Cuba
- Iran
- Italy
- Yugoslavia

Group B

- Mexico
- Netherlands
- Romania
- Soviet Union

Group C

- Australia
- Canada
- Hungary
- West Germany

== Preliminary round ==
=== Group A ===
	Team	Points	G	W	D	L	GF	GA	Diff
1.	Italy	5	3	2	1	0	26	13	+13
2.	Yugoslavia	4	3	1	2	0	25	10	+15
3.	Cuba	3	3	1	1	1	22	15	+7
4.	Iran	0	3	0	0	3	4	39	–35

- 18 July 1976

Yugoslavia	4 – 4	Cuba
Italy	12 – 1	Iran

- 19 July 1976

Yugoslavia	15 – 0	Iran
Italy	8 – 6	Cuba

- 20 July 1976

Yugoslavia	6 – 6	Italy
Cuba	12 – 3	Iran

=== Group B ===
	Team	Points	G	W	D	L	GF	GA	Diff
1.	Netherlands	6	3	3	0	0	14	10	+4
2.	Romania	3	3	1	1	1	18	14	+4
3.	Soviet Union	3	3	1	1	1	14	12	+2
4.	Mexico	0	3	0	0	3	10	20	–10

- 18 July 1976

Netherlands	5 – 3	Mexico
Romania	5 – 5	Soviet Union

- 19 July 1976

Netherlands	3 – 2	Soviet Union
Romania	8 – 3	Mexico

- 20 July 1976

Netherlands	6 – 5	Romania
Soviet Union	7 – 4	Mexico

=== Group C ===
	Team	Points	G	W	D	L	GF	GA	Diff
1.	Hungary	6	3	3	0	0	15	8	+2
2.	West Germany	4	3	2	0	1	9	7	+2
3.	Canada	2	3	1	0	2	8	14	–6
4.	Australia	0	3	0	0	3	14	17	–3

- 18 July 1976

Hungary	7 – 6	Australia
Canada	0 – 5	West Germany

- 19 July 1976

West Germany	4 – 3	Australia
Canada	2 – 4	Hungary

- 20 July 1976

Hungary	4 – 0	West Germany
Canada	6 – 5	Australia

== Classification round ==
=== Group D ===
	Team	Points	G	W	D	L	GF	GA	Diff
7.	Cuba	9	5	4	1	0	34	16	+18
8.	Soviet Union	7	5	3	1	1	33	16	+17
9.	Canada	6	5	2	2	1	27	21	+6
10.	Mexico	5	5	1	3	1	26	19	+5
11.	Australia	3	5	1	1	3	22	25	–3
12.	Iran	0	5	0	0	5	8	53	–45

- 22 July 1976

Cuba	5 – 0 ^{1}	Soviet Union
Canada	4 – 3	Australia
Mexico	11 – 3	Iran

- 23 July 1976

Soviet Union	4 – 3	Mexico
Canada	5 – 7	Cuba
Australia	8 – 2	Iran

- 24 July 1976

Cuba	4 – 4	Mexico
Soviet Union	7 – 2	Australia
Canada	8 – 1	Iran

- 26 July 1976

Cuba	10 – 2	Iran
Canada	6 – 6	Soviet Union
Australia	4 – 4	Mexico

- 27 July 1976

Cuba	8 – 5	Australia
Soviet Union	16 – 0	Iran
Canada	4 – 4	Mexico

^{1} The Soviet Union forfeited the match due to player illness. The USSR also threatened to quit the tournament after failing to make the medal round, but this never materialized.

=== Group E ===
	Team	Points	G	W	D	L	GF	GA	Diff
1.	Hungary	9	5	4	1	0	30	24	+6
2.	Italy	6	5	2	2	1	21	20	+1
3.	Netherlands	6	5	2	2	1	18	17	+1
4.	Romania	5	5	1	3	1	26	25	+1
5.	Yugoslavia	3	5	0	3	2	21	24	–3
6.	West Germany	1	5	0	1	4	15	21	–6

- 22 July 1976

Hungary	6 – 5	Italy
Netherlands	3 – 2	West Germany
Romania	5 – 5	Yugoslavia

- 23 July 1976

Hungary	5 – 3	West Germany
Italy	5 – 4	Yugoslavia
Netherlands	4 – 4	Romania

- 24 July 1976

Hungary	5 – 3	Netherlands
Italy	4 – 4	Romania
Yugoslavia	4 – 4	West Germany

- 26 July 1976

Hungary	9 – 8	Romania
Italy	4 – 3	West Germany
Netherlands	5 – 3	Yugoslavia

- 27 July 1976

Hungary	5 – 5	Yugoslavia
Italy	3 – 3	Netherlands
Romania	5 – 3	West Germany

== Final ranking ==
1. Hungary
2. Italy
3. Netherlands
4. Romania
5. Yugoslavia
6. West Germany
7. Cuba
8. Soviet Union
9. Canada
10. Mexico
11. Australia
12. Iran

1976 Men's Olympic Games winners

Hungary
Sixth title

== See also ==
- 1975 FINA Men's World Water Polo Championship
- 1978 FINA Men's World Water Polo Championship

== Sources ==
- PDF documents in the LA84 Foundation Digital Library:
  - Official Report of the 1976 Olympic Games, v.3 (download, archive) (pp. 446–447, 484–497)
- Water polo on the Olympedia website
  - Water polo at the 1976 Summer Olympics (men's tournament)
- Water polo on the Sports Reference website
  - Water polo at the 1976 Summer Games (men's tournament) (archived)
