= Paolo Ragosa =

Italian water polo player (born 1954)

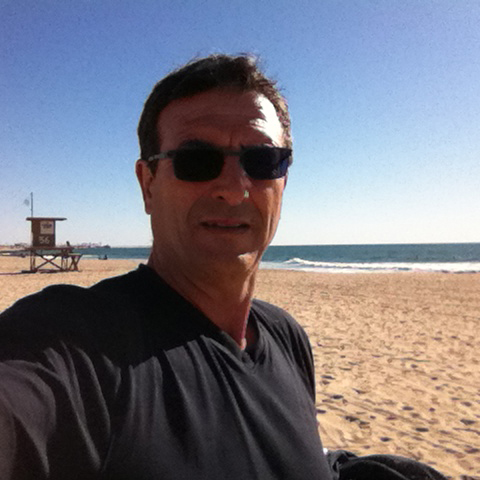
- Ragosa in 2014

Personal information
- Nationality: Italian
- Born: 11 September 1954 (age 71) Voltri, Italy

Sport
- Sport: Water polo
Medal record
Representing Italy
World Championships
Gold medal – first place	1978 West Berlin	Team competition
European Championships
Bronze medal – third place	1977 Jönköping	Team competition

Paolo Ragosa (born 11 September 1954) is an Italian former water polo player. He competed in the men's tournament at the 1980 Summer Olympics.

== See also ==
- List of world champions in men's water polo
- List of World Aquatics Championships medalists in water polo
