= Marco Galli =

Italian water polo player

Personal information
- Nationality: Italian
- Born: 5 March 1957 Rome, Italy
- Died: 3 October 1988 (aged 31)

Sport
- Sport: Water polo
Medal record
Representing Italy
World Championships
Gold medal – first place	1978 West Berlin	Team competition
Mediterranean Games
Silver medal – second place	1979 Split	Team competition

Marco Galli (5 March 1957 – 3 October 1988) was an Italian water polo player. He competed in the men's tournament at the 1984 Summer Olympics.

== See also ==
- List of world champions in men's water polo
- List of World Aquatics Championships medalists in water polo
