= Rodolfo Giovenzana =

Italian volleyball player (born 1949)

Personal information
- Nationality: Italian
- Born: 22 February 1949 (age 76); Modena, Italy

Sport
- Sport: Volleyball

Rodolfo Giovenzana (born 22 February 1949) is an Italian volleyball player. He competed in the men's tournament at the 1976 Summer Olympics.
