= Riccardo De Magistris =

Italian water polo player

Personal information
- Born: June 2, 1954 (age 72) Florence, Italy

Sport
- Sport: Water polo
Medal record
Representing Italy
Olympic Games
Silver medal – second place	1976 Montreal	Team competition
European Championships
Bronze medal – third place	1977 Jönköping	Team competition

Riccardo De Magistris (born 2 June 1954) is an Italian former water polo player who competed in the 1976 Summer Olympics, winning the silver medal with his squad. He is the younger brother of Gianni De Magistris, a teammate at those games who also took part in four other Olympics.

== See also ==
- List of Olympic medalists in water polo (men)
