= Massimo Fondelli =

Italian water polo player (born 1954)

Personal information
- Nationality: Italian
- Born: 9 February 1954 (age 72) Camogli, Italy

Sport
- Sport: Water polo
Medal record
Representing Italy
World Championships
Gold medal – first place	1978 West Berlin	Team competition
European Championships
Bronze medal – third place	1977 Jönköping	Team competition
Mediterranean Games
Silver medal – second place	1979 Split	Team competition

Massimo Fondelli (born 9 February 1954) is an Italian former water polo player. He competed in the men's tournament at the 1980 Summer Olympics.

== See also ==
- List of world champions in men's water polo
- List of World Aquatics Championships medalists in water polo
