= Sante Spigarelli =

Italian archer (born 1943)

Personal information
- Nationality: Italian
- Born: 31 October 1943 (age 82) Sigillo, Italy

Sport
- Sport: Archery

Sante Spigarelli (born 31 October 1943) is an Italian archer. He competed at the 1972 Summer Olympics, the 1976 Summer Olympics and the 1980 Summer Olympics.
