= Stefano Sibani =

Italian volleyball player (born 1951)

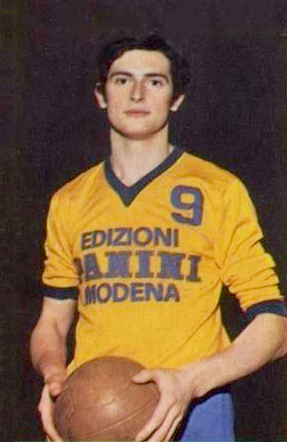

Personal information
- Born: 6 October 1951 (age 74) Bologna, Italy
- Height: 1.90 m (6 ft 3 in)
- Weight: 83 kg (183 lb)

Sport
- Sport: Volleyball
- Club: Pallavolo Modena

Stefano Sibani (born 6 October 1951) is a retired Italian volleyball player. He was part of Italian teams that finished eighth at the 1976 Summer Olympics and ninth at the 1980 Summer Olympics.
