= Umberto Panerai =

Italian water polo player (born 1953)

Personal information
- Born: 13 March 1953 (age 73) Florence, Italy

Sport
- Sport: Water polo
Medal record
Representing Italy
Olympic Games
Silver medal – second place	1976 Montreal	Team competition
European Championships
Bronze medal – third place	1977 Jönköping	Team competition
Mediterranean Games
Gold medal – first place	1975 Algiers	Team competition

Umberto Panerai (born 13 March 1953) is an Italian retired water polo player, who competed in three consecutive Summer Olympics for his native country, starting in 1976. He was born in Florence.

Panerai was a member of the Men's National Team, that claimed the silver medal at the Montréal Olympics. During his career he was affiliated with Rari Nantes Florentia in Florence.

He was appointed to the Order of Merit of the Italian Republic.

He was a trainer for Luna Rossa Challenge for the 2000 America’s Cup and 2013 Louis Vuitton Cup.

== See also ==
- Italy men's Olympic water polo team records and statistics
- List of Olympic medalists in water polo (men)
- List of men's Olympic water polo tournament goalkeepers
