= Dezső Gyarmati =

Hungarian water polo player (1927–2013)

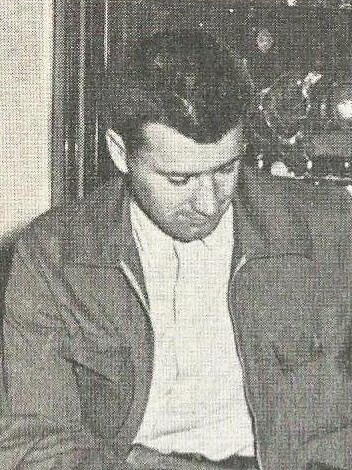
- Gyarmati in 1954

Personal information
- Nationality: Hungarian
- Born: 23 October 1927 Miskolc, Hungary
- Died: 18 August 2013 (aged 85) Budapest, Hungary
- Height: 1.86 m (6 ft 1 in)
- Weight: 83 kg (183 lb)

Sport
- Sport: Water polo
- Handedness: Left
- Position: Utility

Senior clubs
- Years: Team
- ?: Újpesti TE
- ?: Ferencvárosi TC
Medal record
Men's water polo
Representing Hungary
Olympic Games
Silver medal – second place	1948 London	Team Competition
Gold medal – first place	1952 Helsinki	Team Competition
Gold medal – first place	1956 Melbourne	Team Competition
Bronze medal – third place	1960 Rome	Team Competition
Gold medal – first place	1964 Tokyo	Team Competition
European Championship
Gold medal – first place	1954	Team competition
Gold medal – first place	1962	Team competition

Dezső Gyarmati (23 October 1927 – 18 August 2013) was a Hungarian professional water polo player and three-time Olympic champion; he later became the coach of the Hungarian national water polo team. Widely regarded as a "legendary player", Gyarmati was the most decorated player in the history of the sport.

== Early life and family ==
Dezső Gyarmati was born in Miskolc, Borsod-Abaúj-Zemplén.

He married Éva Székely, a swimmer who was the 1952 Olympic champion in the 200-metre breaststroke. Their daughter Andrea Gyarmati has competed as a backstroke and butterfly swimmer; she received two Olympic medals in 1972, and is a one-time world record holder for the 100 metres butterfly.

== Playing career ==
As a left-handed utility player, Gyarmati could play in all positions of the field. He was the most successful water polo player in the history of the Olympics. He participated in five different Summer Olympics, winning three gold medals with the Hungarian team at the 1952 Summer Olympics in Helsinki, the 1956 Summer Olympics in Melbourne, and the 1964 Summer Olympics in Tokyo. His team received silver medals at the 1948 Summer Olympics in London, and bronze medals at the 1960 Summer Olympics in Rome. Gyarmati became European Champion two times, in 1954 and in 1962. He is widely considered the greatest water polo player of all time.

Gyarmati played a total of 108 matches with the Hungary national team. He was among the fastest water polo players of his time, with a personal record of 58.5 seconds for 100 meters.

Gyarmati played in the famous Blood in the Water match between Hungary and the Soviet Union at the 1956 Olympics, which occurred weeks after the Soviet invasion of Hungary. FINA stated that while it is usually "remembered as the 'Blood bath of Melbourne' after the scenes of the dying minutes, it was team captain Gyarmati who opened the scoring and set up the other three goals Hungary netted while winning 4-0 en route to the title."

== Coaching and administrative career ==
Dezső Gyarmati
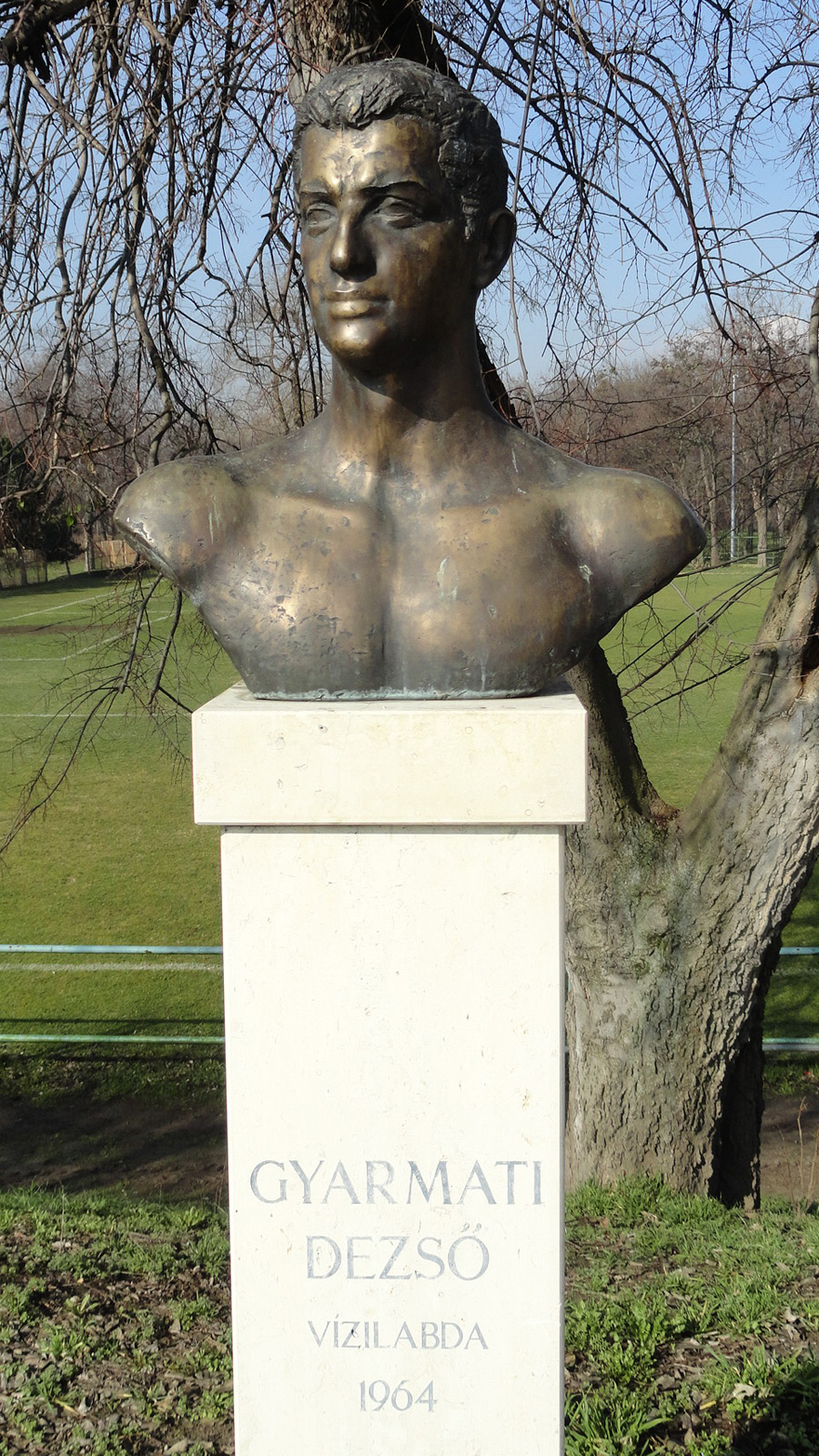

Sport
- Sport: Water polo

Teams coached
- Years: Team
- 1972–1980: Hungary
Medal record
Men's water polo
Representing Hungary
Olympic Games
Silver medal – second place	1972 Munich
Gold medal – first place	1976 Montreal
Bronze medal – third place	1980 Moscow
World Championship
Gold medal – first place	1973 Belgrade
Silver medal – second place	1975 Cali
Silver medal – second place	1978 West Berlin
FINA World Cup
Gold medal – first place	1979 Belgrade
European Championship
Gold medal – first place	1974 Vienna
Gold medal – first place	1977 Jönköping

After his competitive years, Gyarmati began working as a water polo coach. He left Europe to coach the Colombian national team from 1970 to 1971.

Gyarmati then returned to Europe and, from 1972 to 1980, coached the Hungary men's national team. He led them again from 1985 to 1988. Under his coaching, the team gained gold medals at 1976 Summer Olympics in Montreal, a silver medal at the 1972 Summer Olympics in Munich, and the bronze medal at the 1980 Summer Olympics in Moscow, making him one of the most successful water polo coaches in Olympic history, and one of a few sportspeople who won Olympic medals in water polo as players and head coaches. They also won the inaugural editions of both the FINA World Championship (in 1973) and the FINA World Cup (in 1979), as well as the European Championship in 1974 and 1977. They were runners-up in the World Championship in 1975 and 1978.

In the 1980s Gyamarti coached Hungarian club teams to several medals in the national league.

Gyarmati served as a member of the board of the Hungarian Water Polo Federation. He also wrote several books about water polo, including a history of Hungarian water polo.

== Political career ==
After the 1989 break-up of the Soviet Union and Eastern Bloc, Gyamarti entered politics. Benefitting from his achievements and name recognition, he was elected Member of Parliament from the National List of the Hungarian Democratic Forum (MDF) in the 1990 Hungarian parliamentary election. He served as a member of the Committee on Municipality, Public Administration, Internal Security and Police.

He unsuccessfully ran for a parliamentary seat during the 1994 and 1998 parliamentary elections. In 2003, he was appointed as Chairman of the Sports Section of the Fidesz's Cultural Department.

== Awards ==
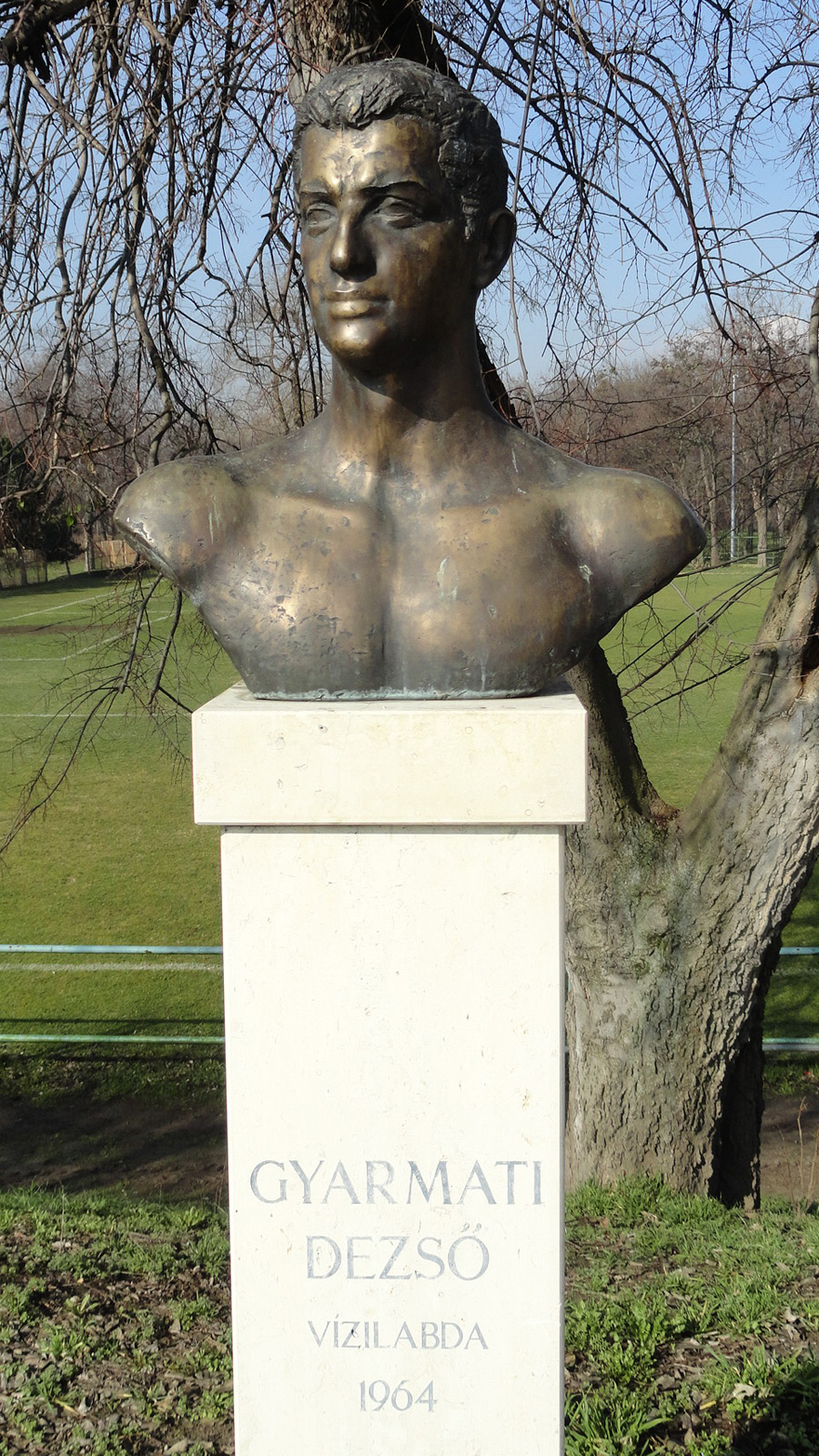
Bust of Dezső Gyarmati

In addition to his Olympic medals, he received other recognition of his achievements:

- 1976, Gyarmati was inducted into the International Swimming Hall of Fame. He was awarded the title of Athlete of the Nation in 2004.
- He received the Commander's Cross of the Order of Merit of the Republic of Hungary in 1994.
- In 2010, he received the Grand Cross (the highest civilian award for a non-head of state).

== Death ==
Gyarmati died in Budapest on 18 August 2013 at the age of 85. In a statement, FINA said that they were "in mourning", calling him one of the best water polo players of all time. FINA described him thus: "The left-handed genius could play in all positions of the field. Known for his fearless approach in every game, he was able to decide the biggest clashes single-handedly."

FINA in their statement said that, despite a long illness and "broken" health, he had attended Hungary's last match before the 2013 World Championship and watched Hungary's victory in the Championship from his hospital bed.

== See also ==
- Hungary men's Olympic water polo team records and statistics
- List of athletes with the most appearances at Olympic Games
- List of players who have appeared in multiple men's Olympic water polo tournaments
- List of multiple Olympic medalists in one event
- List of multiple Olympic gold medalists in one event
- List of Olympic champions in men's water polo
- List of Olympic medalists in water polo (men)
- List of world champions in men's water polo
- List of members of the International Swimming Hall of Fame
- Blood in the Water match
