= Paolo Montorsi =

Italian volleyball player (born 1951)

Personal information
- Nationality: Italian
- Born: 14 August 1951 (age 73); Modena, Italy

Sport
- Sport: Volleyball

Paolo Montorsi (born 14 August 1951) is an Italian volleyball player. He competed in the men's tournament at the 1976 Summer Olympics.
