= Alberto Alberani =

Italian water polo player

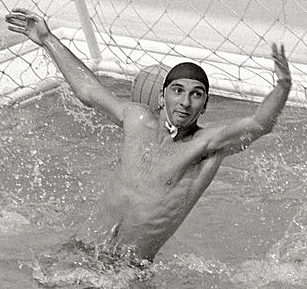
- Alberani at the 1968 Olympics

Personal information
- Full name: Alberto Alberani Samaritani
- Born: 22 May 1947 (age 79) Florence, Italy
- Height: 1.92 m (6 ft 4 in)
- Weight: 82 kg (181 lb)

Sport
- Sport: Water polo
- Club: Pro Recco; FIAT Torino
Medal record
Representing Italy
Olympic Games
Silver medal – second place	1976 Montréal	Team
World Championships
Bronze medal – third place	1975 Cali	Team
Gold medal – first place	1978 Berlin	Team

Alberto Alberani Samaritani (born 22 May 1947) is a retired Italian water polo goalkeeper. He competed at 1968, 1972, 1976, and 1980 Olympics and won a silver medal in 1976.

== See also ==
- Italy men's Olympic water polo team records and statistics
- List of Olympic medalists in water polo (men)
- List of players who have appeared in multiple men's Olympic water polo tournaments
- List of men's Olympic water polo tournament goalkeepers
- List of world champions in men's water polo
- List of World Aquatics Championships medalists in water polo
