= Claudio De Miro =

Italian diver (born 1956)

Personal information
- Nationality: Italian
- Born: 19 December 1956 (age 69) Naples, Italy

Sport
- Sport: Diving

Claudio De Miro (born 19 December 1956) is an Italian diver. He competed in two events at the 1976 Summer Olympics.
