= Vincenzo D'Angelo =

Italian water polo player (1951–2008)

Personal information
- Born: 22 January 1951 Bacoli, Italy
- Died: 6 February 2008 (aged 57) Villejuif, France

Sport
- Sport: Water polo
Medal record
Representing Italy
Olympic Games
Silver medal – second place	1976 Montreal	Team competition
World Championships
Bronze medal – third place	1975 Cali	Team competition
Mediterranean Games
Gold medal – first place	1975 Algiers	Team competition
Silver medal – second place	1979 Split	Team competition

Vincenzo D'Angelo (22 January 1951 – 6 February 2008) was an Italian water polo player who competed in the 1976 Summer Olympics, in the 1980 Summer Olympics, and in the 1984 Summer Olympics.

== See also ==
- List of Olympic medalists in water polo (men)
- List of World Aquatics Championships medalists in water polo
