= György Kenéz =

Hungarian water polo player (born 1956)

Personal information
- Born: June 23, 1956 (age 70) Budapest, Hungary

Sport
- Sport: Water polo
Medal record
Representing Hungary
Olympic Games
Gold medal – first place	1976 Montreal	Team competition
World Championships
Silver medal – second place	1978 West Berlin	Team competition
Silver medal – second place	1982 Guayaquil	Team competition
European Championships
Gold medal – first place	1977 Jönköping	Team competition
Silver medal – second place	1983 Rome	Team competition
Bronze medal – third place	1981 Split	Team competition

György Kenéz (born 23 June 1956) is a Hungarian former water polo player who competed in the 1976 Summer Olympics.

== See also ==
- Hungary men's Olympic water polo team records and statistics
- List of Olympic champions in men's water polo
- List of Olympic medalists in water polo (men)
- List of World Aquatics Championships medalists in water polo
