= Andrea Nencini =

Italian volleyball player (born 1948)

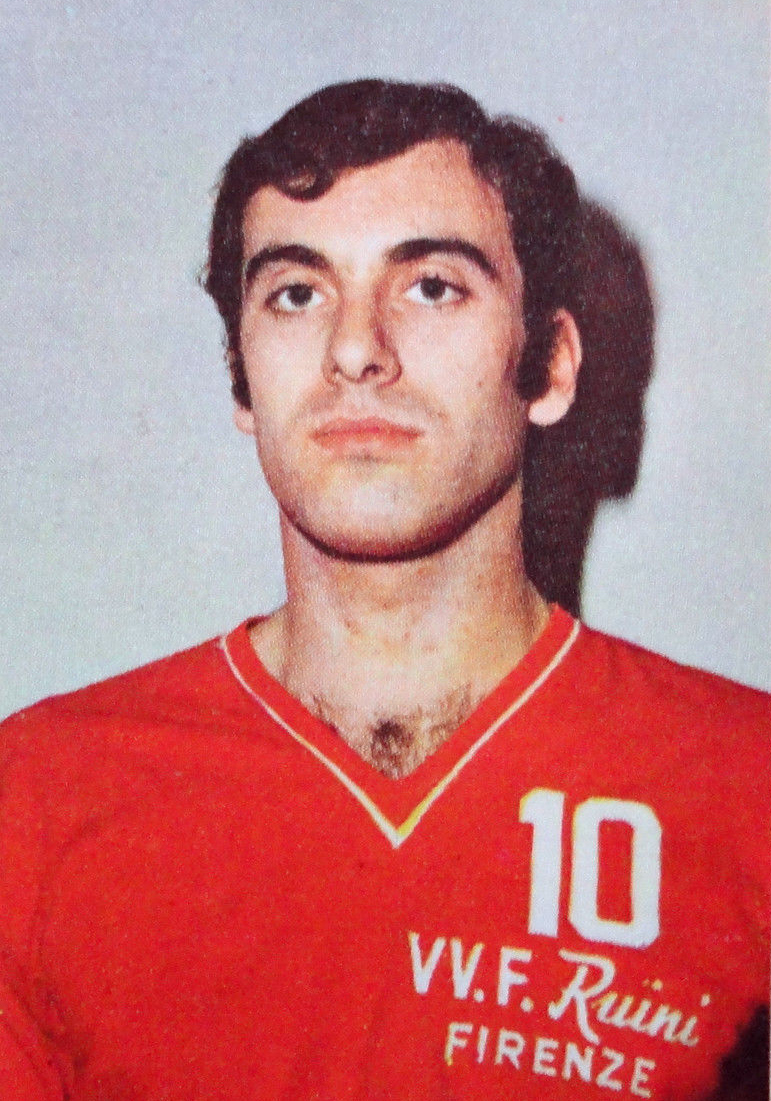

Personal information
- Born: 25 December 1948 (age 77) Sesto Fiorentino, Firenze, Italy
- Height: 1.93 m (6 ft 4 in)
- Weight: 86 kg (190 lb)

Sport
- Sport: Volleyball
- Club: Ariccia Volley Club
Medal record
Representing Italy
Summer Universiade
| Gold medal – first place | 1970 Turin | Team |
Mediterranean Games
| Silver medal – second place | 1975 Algiers | Team |

Andrea Nencini (born 25 December 1948) is a retired Italian volleyball player. He was part of the Italian teams that won the 1970 Summer Universiade and finished second at the 1975 Mediterranean Games and eighth at the 1976 Summer Olympics.
