= Luigi Castagnola (water polo) =

Italian water polo player

Personal information
- Born: March 22, 1953 (age 73) Sori, Italy

Sport
- Sport: Water polo
Medal record
Representing Italy
Olympic Games
Silver medal – second place	1976 Montreal	Team competition
World Championships
Bronze medal – third place	1975 Cali	Team competition
European Championships
Bronze medal – third place	1977 Jönköping	Team competition
Mediterranean Games
Gold medal – first place	1975 Algiers	Team competition

Luigi Castagnola (born 22 March 1953) is an Italian former water polo player who competed in the 1976 Summer Olympics.

== See also ==
- List of Olympic medalists in water polo (men)
- List of World Aquatics Championships medalists in water polo
