= Szilveszter Fekete =

Hungarian water polo player and coach

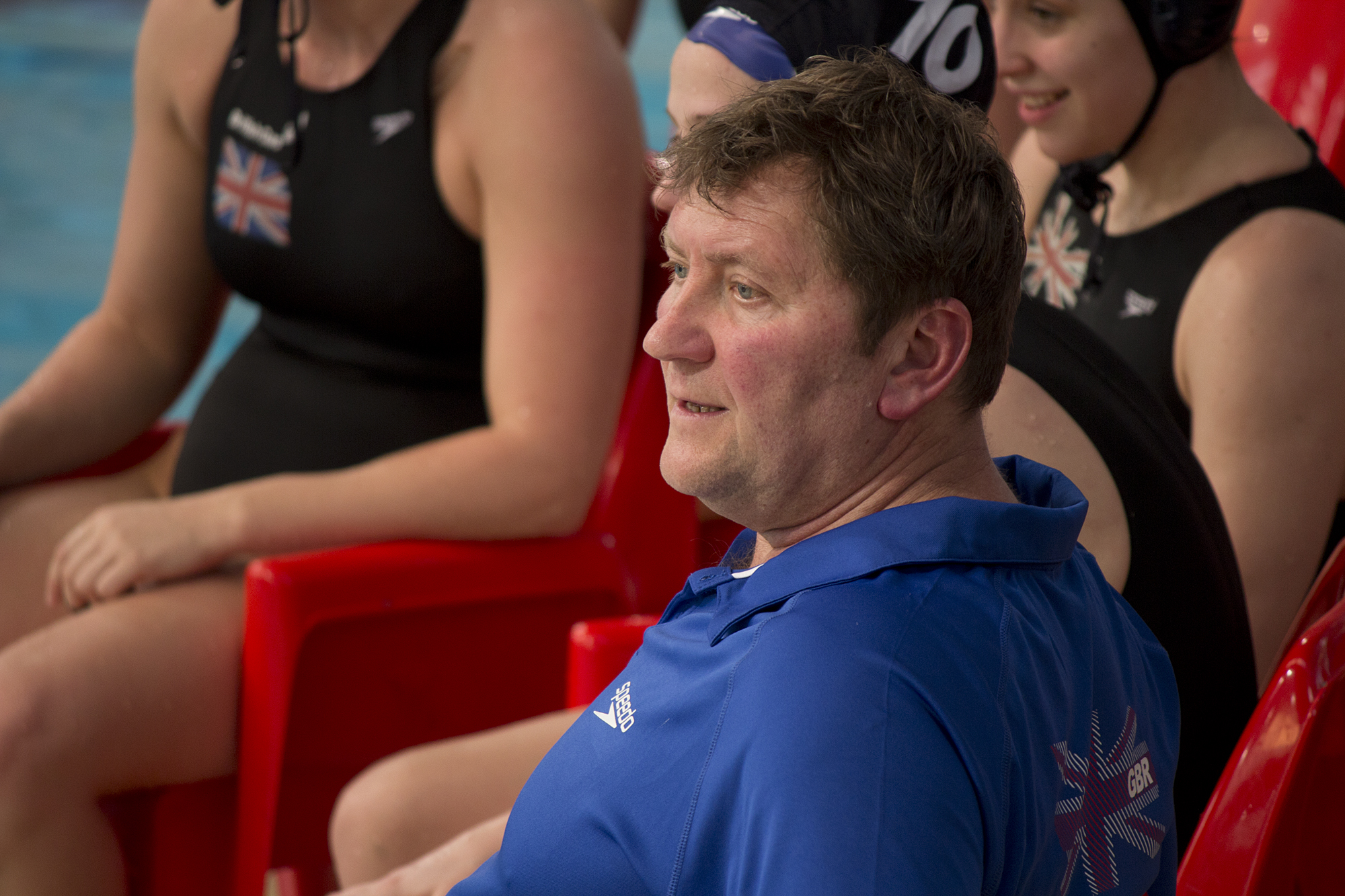
- Fekete in 2012

Personal information
- Born: 1955 (age 70–71) Budapest, Hungary

Sport
- Sport: Water polo
Medal record
Representing Hungary
World Championships
Silver medal – second place	1978 West Berlin	Team competition

Szilveszter Fekete (born 1955) is a Hungarian water polo coach. He was the head coach of the Great Britain women's national water polo team at the 2012 Summer Olympics.

== See also ==
- List of World Aquatics Championships medalists in water polo
