= Silvio Baracchini =

Italian water polo player

Personal information
- Born: August 28, 1950 (age 75) Genoa, Italy

Sport
- Sport: Water polo
Medal record
Representing Italy
Olympic Games
Silver medal – second place	1976 Montreal	Team competition
World Championships
Gold medal – first place	1978 West Berlin	Team competition
Bronze medal – third place	1975 Cali	Team competition
European Championships
Bronze medal – third place	1977 Jönköping	Team competition
Mediterranean Games
Gold medal – first place	1975 Algiers	Team competition
Summer Universiade
Silver medal – second place	1970 Turin	Team competition

Silvio Baracchini (born 28 August 1950) is an Italian former water polo player who competed in the 1972 Summer Olympics and in the 1976 Summer Olympics, winning the silver medal.

== See also ==
- List of Olympic medalists in water polo (men)
- List of world champions in men's water polo
- List of World Aquatics Championships medalists in water polo
