= Gábor Csapó =

Hungarian water polo player (1950–2022)

Personal information
- Born: 20 September 1950 Budapest, Hungary
- Died: 27 November 2022 (aged 72) Budapest, Hungary

Sport
- Sport: Water polo
Medal record
Representing Hungary
Olympic Games
| Gold medal – first place | 1976 Montreal | Team competition |
| Bronze medal – third place | 1980 Moscow | Team competition |
World Championships
| Gold medal – first place | 1973 Belgrade | Team competition |
| Silver medal – second place | 1975 Cali | Team competition |
| Silver medal – second place | 1978 West Berlin | Team competition |
| Silver medal – second place | 1982 Guayaquil | Team competition |
European Championships
| Gold medal – first place | 1974 Vienna | Team competition |
| Gold medal – first place | 1977 Jönköping | Team competition |
| Silver medal – second place | 1983 Rome | Team competition |

Gábor Csapó (20 September 1950 – 27 November 2022) was a Hungarian water polo player who competed in the 1976 Summer Olympics and in the 1980 Summer Olympics. He died from respiratory failure on 27 November 2022, at the age of 72.

== See also ==
- Hungary men's Olympic water polo team records and statistics
- List of Olympic champions in men's water polo
- List of Olympic medalists in water polo (men)
- List of world champions in men's water polo
- List of World Aquatics Championships medalists in water polo
