= Sante Marsili =

Italian water polo player (1950–2024)

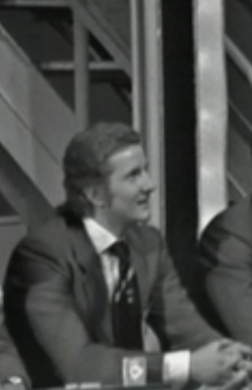
- Sante Marsili (1972)

Personal information
- Born: 31 October 1950 Naples, Italy
- Died: 2 January 2024 (aged 73)

Sport
- Sport: Water polo
Medal record
Representing Italy
Olympic Games
Silver medal – second place	1976 Montreal	Team competition
World Championships
Gold medal – first place	1978 West Berlin	Team competition
Bronze medal – third place	1975 Cali	Team competition
European Championships
Bronze medal – third place	1977 Jönköping	Team competition

Sante Marsili (31 October 1950 – 2 September 2024) was an Italian water polo player who competed in the 1972 Summer Olympics, in the 1976 Summer Olympics, and in the 1980 Summer Olympics.

Marsili died on 2 September 2024, at the age of 73.

== See also ==
- List of Olympic medalists in water polo (men)
- List of world champions in men's water polo
- List of World Aquatics Championships medalists in water polo
