= Alessandro Ghibellini =

Italian water polo player

Personal information
- Born: 15 October 1947 (age 78) Genoa, Italy
Medal record
Men's water polo
Representing Italy
Olympic Games
Silver medal – second place	1976 Montreal	Team competition
World Championships
Gold medal – first place	1978 West Berlin	Team competition
Bronze medal – third place	1975 Cali	Team competition

Alessandro Ghibellini (born 15 October 1947) is an Italian former water polo player who competed in the 1968 Summer Olympics, in the 1972 Summer Olympics, and in the 1976 Summer Olympics.

== See also ==
- List of Olympic medalists in water polo (men)
- List of world champions in men's water polo
- List of World Aquatics Championships medalists in water polo
