= Roldano Simeoni =

Italian water polo player

Personal information
- Born: 21 December 1948 (age 77) Civitavecchia, Italy

Sport
- Sport: Water polo
Medal record
Representing Italy
Olympic Games
Silver medal – second place	1976 Montréal	Team competition
World Championships
Gold medal – first place	1978 West Berlin	Team competition
Bronze medal – third place	1975 Cali	Team competition
European Championships
Bronze medal – third place	1977 Jönköping	Team competition

Roldano Simeoni (born 21 December 1948) is a retired water polo player from Italy, who competed in three consecutive Summer Olympics for his native country, starting in 1972.

Simeoni was a member of the Men's National Team, that claimed the silver medal at the Montréal Olympics. During his career he was affiliated with Società Nuoto e Canottaggio Civitavecchia and Pro Recco.

== See also ==
- List of Olympic medalists in water polo (men)
- List of world champions in men's water polo
- List of World Aquatics Championships medalists in water polo
