= István Magas =

Hungarian water polo player

Personal information
- Born: February 22, 1952 (age 74) Budapest, Hungary

Sport
- Sport: Water polo
Medal record
Representing Hungary
Olympic Games
Silver medal – second place	1972 Munich	Team competition
World Championships
Silver medal – second place	1975 Cali	Team competition
Silver medal – second place	1978 West Berlin	Team competition
European Championships
Gold medal – first place	1977 Jönköping	Team competition

István Magas (born 22 February 1952) is a Hungarian former water polo player who competed in the 1972 Summer Olympics.

== Biography ==
He has been professor at the University of Connecticut, Storrs, Willamette University, Texas Tech University, and at the Corvinus University, Budapest, where between 2008-2012 he led the Department of World Economy.

His research interest is in international finance and patterns of globalization. He received the Doctor of Science degree from the Hungarian Academy of Sciences in 2013.

== See also ==
- List of Olympic medalists in water polo (men)
- List of World Aquatics Championships medalists in water polo
